= 2009 Tour of Flanders =

2009 UCI ProTour, 2009 UCI World Ranking
- Poster for the events in starting place Bruges

Race details
- Dates: 5 April 2009
- Stages: 1
- Distance: 259.7 km (161.4 mi)
- Winning time: 6h 01' 04"

Results
	Winner	Stijn Devolder (BEL)	(Quick-Step)
	Second	Heinrich Haussler (GER)	(Cervélo TestTeam)
	Third	Philippe Gilbert (BEL)	(Silence–Lotto)

The 2009 Tour of Flanders cycle race is the 93rd edition of the monument classic and took place on 5 April. The course is 259.7 km long and goes from Bruges to Meerbeke. The weather during the race was sunny and warm at 12 °C. The race was the fifth event in the inaugural UCI World Ranking series.

Pre-race favorites included Filippo Pozzato (winner of the E3 Prijs Vlaanderen and a stage in the Three Days of De Panne), Tom Boonen (winner in 2005 and 2006), Stijn Devolder (winner in 2008), Nick Nuyens (2nd in 2008) and Heinrich Haussler (2nd in Milan–San Remo, 4th in Dwars door Vlaanderen, several other impressive results in 2009).

In a victory highly similar to the 2008 Tour of Flanders, Stijn Devolder powered away late to the win. With what pundits called the strongest team in the race behind him, the QuickStep rider was able to ride away, while other teams marked teammates Tom Boonen and Sylvain Chavanel. With riders such as favorite Pozzato watching Boonen, Devolder found the strength to solo to victory. Haussler, who was riding in support of Thor Hushovd planned not to contest the victory but said he was told by Hushovd to challenge Devolder.

Following the race CNN reported:

[The race] was brought to life with 50km remaining when Italian Manuel Quinziato, Frenchman Sylvain Chavanel and three-time runner-up Leif Hoste led a six-rider breakaway. However, they were gradually caught by race favorites Devolder, compatriot and dual winner Tom Boonen and Italian Filippo Pozzato. Devolder made his decisive move over the crest of the penultimate climb, the Muur-Kapelmuur, and by the time he had reached the final climb, the Bosberg, he had an unassailable advantage. The rest of the breakaway riders were eventually caught by the peloton and German Haussler won the sprint for second place which was marred by a nasty crash on the final straight into Meerbeke.

== General standings ==
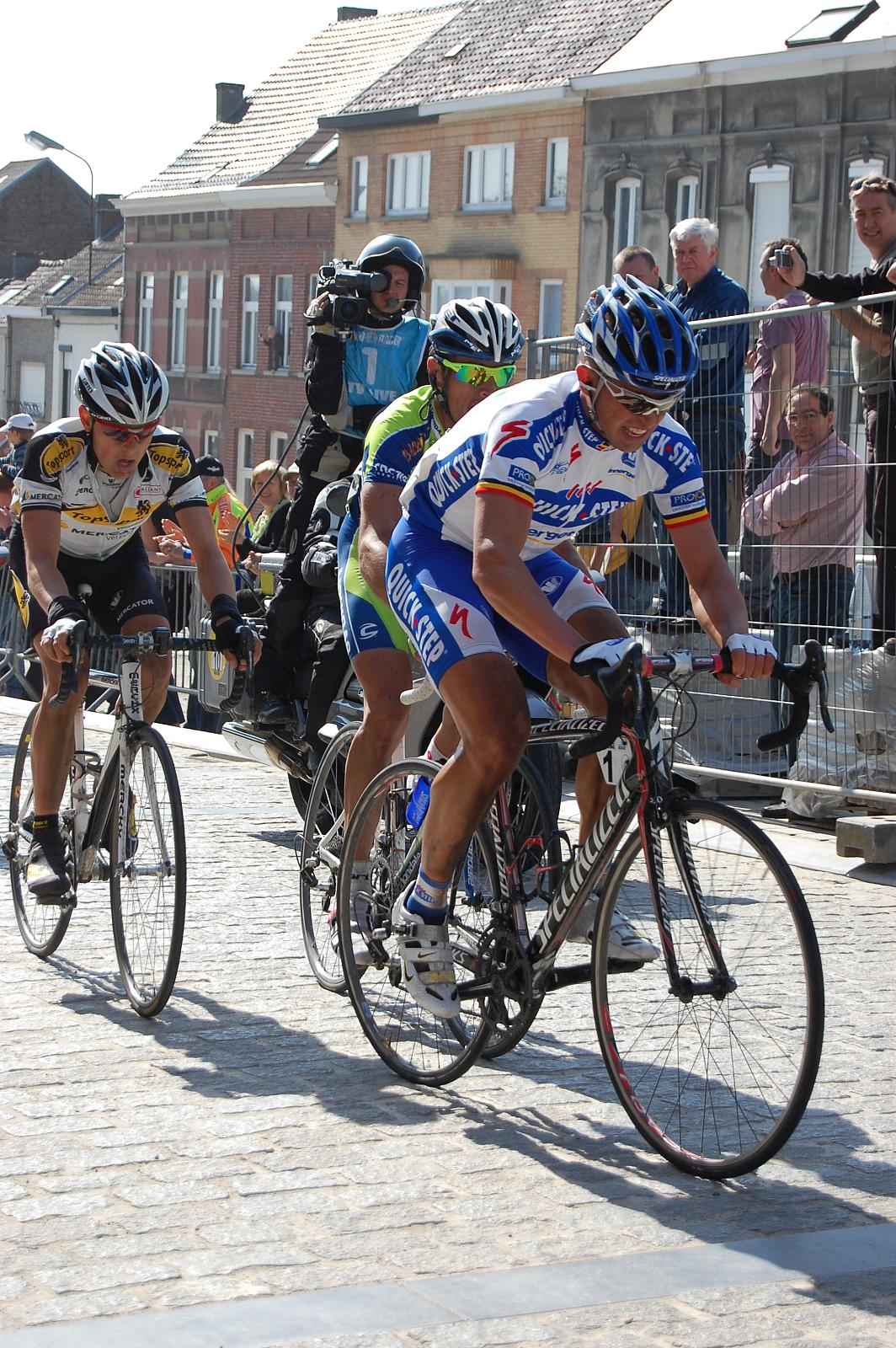
Stijn Devolder, with Manuel Quinziato (Liquigas) and Preben Van Hecke (Topsport Vlaanderen) in Geraardsbergen.

	Cyclist	Team	Time	UCI World Ranking Points
1	Stijn Devolder (BEL)	Quick-Step	6h 01' 04"	100
2	Heinrich Haussler (GER)	Cervélo TestTeam	+ 59"	80
3	Philippe Gilbert (BEL)	Silence–Lotto	s.t.	70
4	Martijn Maaskant (NED)	Garmin–Slipstream	s.t.	60
5	Filippo Pozzato (ITA)	Team Katusha	s.t.	50
6	Matti Breschel (DEN)	Team Saxo Bank	s.t.	40
7	Marcus Burghardt (GER)	Team Columbia–High Road	s.t.	30
8	Björn Leukemans (BEL)	Vacansoleil Pro Cycling Team	s.t.	20
9	Martin Elmiger (SUI)	Ag2r–La Mondiale	s.t.	10
10	Bert De Waele (BEL)	Landbouwkrediet–Colnago	s.t.	4

Almost exactly one minute after Devolder crossed the line 29 other riders arrived, and all were awarded the same time. Beyond the top ten, these included: 11 Alexandre Pichot, 12 Johnny Hoogerland, 13 Roger Hammond, 14 Karsten Kroon, 15 Nick Nuyens, 16 Roy Sentjens, 17 Kevin Van Impe, 18 Frederik Willems, 19 Bert Scheirlinckx, 20 Tom Boonen, 21 Gerben Löwik, 22 Staf Scheirlinckx, 23 Serguei Ivanov, 24 Andreas Klier, 25 Preben Van Hecke, 26 Assan Bazayev, 27 Leif Hoste, 28 Paolo Longo Borghini, 29 Frédéric Guesdon, 30 Juan Antonio Flecha. A crash during the group sprint for second place marred the finish of some riders in this group, including Thor Hushovd, George Hincapie, Bernhard Eisel, and Grégory Rast.

197 riders started the race.

== Individual 2009 UCI World Ranking standings after race ==
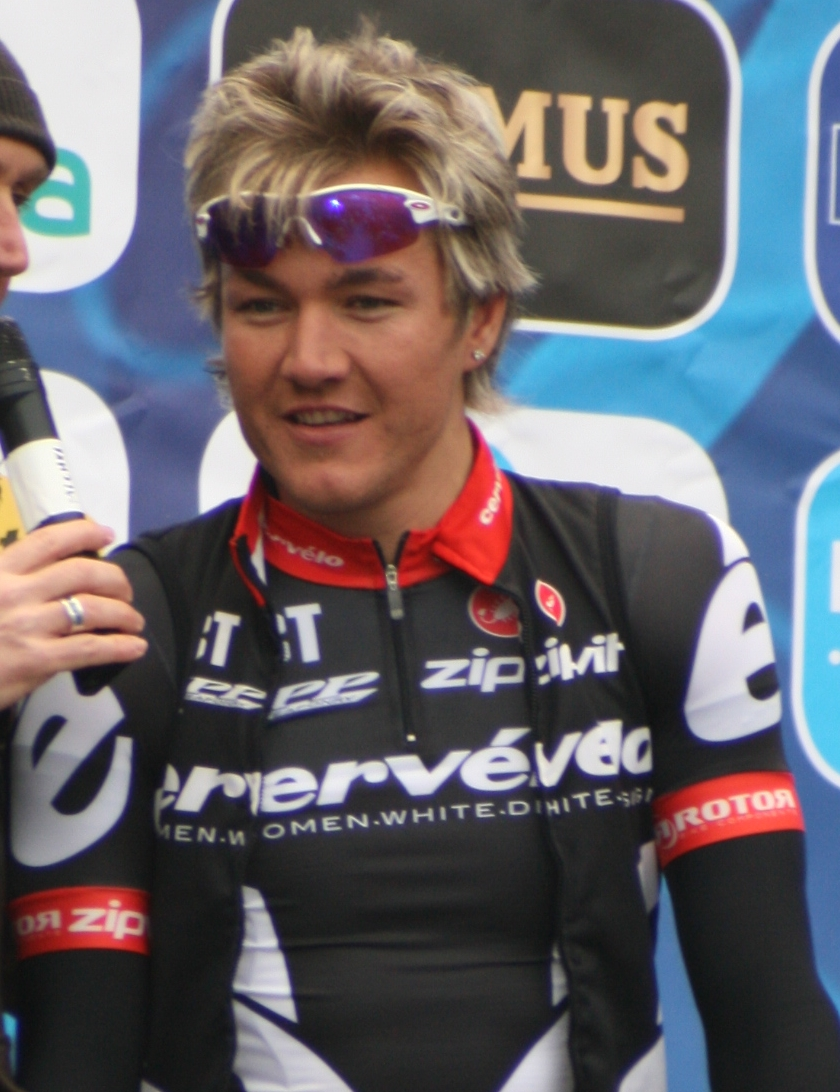
Heinrich Haussler at the start of the race.

Rank	Name	Team	Points
1	Allan Davis (AUS)	Quick-Step	182
2	Heinrich Haussler (GER)	Cervélo TestTeam	167
3	Luis León Sánchez (ESP)	Caisse d'Epargne	111
4	Mark Cavendish (GBR)	Team Columbia–High Road	110
5	Michele Scarponi (ITA)	Diquigiovanni–Androni	107
6	Stijn Devolder (BEL)	Quick-Step	107
7	Fränk Schleck (LUX)	Team Saxo Bank	88
8	Stuart O'Grady (AUS)	Team Saxo Bank	87
9	Stefano Garzelli (ITA)	Acqua & Sapone–Caffè Mokambo	85
10	Sylvain Chavanel (FRA)	Quick-Step	77

== Course ==
The 16 Ronde van Vlaanderen hills were:

Number	Kilometer	Name
1	131.2	Molenberg
2	140.5	Wolvenberg
3	180.0	Oude Kwaremont
4	183.7	Paterberg
5	190.2	Koppenberg
6	195.7	Steenbeekdries
7	198.0	Taaienberg
8	203.2	Eikenberg
9	208.2	Varent
10	213.8	Leberg
11	218.1	Berendries
12	223.5	Valkenberg
13	230.3	Tenbosse
14	235.8	Eikenmolen
15	245.8	Muur-Kapelmuur
16	249.7	Bosberg
