= Ridderronde Maastricht =

Annual road bicycle racing event in Maastricht, Netherlands

Race details
- Date: June
- Region: Maastricht, Netherlands
- Discipline: Road race
- Type: criterium
- Web site: www.ridderronde.nl

History
- First edition: Men: 1985; Women: 2008
- Editions: Men: 35 (as of 1985); Women: 11 (as of 2008)
- First winner: Men; Joop Zoetemelk (NED); Women; Rochelle Gilmore (AUS)
- Most wins: Men; Tom Dumoulin (NED) (3 wins); Women; Marianne Vos (NED) (5 wins)
- Most recent: Men; Vincenzo Nibali (ITA); Women; Chantal van den Broek-Blaak (NED)

Ridderronde Maastricht is an elite men's and women's professional road bicycle racing event held annually in Maastricht, Netherlands. The first edition was in 1985 and since 2008 the event also includes a women's race. Since 2019 Ridderronde was renamed RSM Wealer Ronde.

== Honours ==
=== Men's ===
2022	(Italy) Vincenzo Nibali	(Netherlands) Koen Bouwman	(Netherlands) Tom Dumoulin
2021
2020
2019	(Belgium) Philippe Gilbert	(Netherlands) Mike Teunissen	(Netherlands) Bauke Mollema
2018	(Netherlands) Roy Curvers	(Netherlands) Wout Poels	(Netherlands) Tom Dumoulin
2017	(Netherlands) Tom Dumoulin	(Netherlands) Mike Teunissen	(Netherlands) Tom Leezer
2016	(Australia) Mathew Hayman	(Netherlands) Laurens ten Dam	(Germany) Paul Martens
2015	(Netherlands) Wouter Poels	(Netherlands) Steven Kruijswijk	(Netherlands) Pieter Weening
2014	(Netherlands) Tom Dumoulin	(Netherlands) Karsten Kroon	(Netherlands) Bram Tankink
2013	(Netherlands) Tom Dumoulin	(Netherlands) Wout Poels	(Netherlands) Roy Curvers
2012	(Netherlands) Laurens ten Dam	(Netherlands) Kenny van Hummel	(Netherlands) Karsten Kroon
2011	(Netherlands) Rob Ruijgh	(Netherlands) Karsten Kroon	(Netherlands) Addy Engels
2010	(Netherlands) Servais Knaven	(Netherlands) Maarten Tjallingii	(Netherlands) Karsten Kroon
2009	(Netherlands) Niki Terpstra	(Netherlands) Laurens ten Dam	(Netherlands) Wouter Mol
2008	(Netherlands) Pieter Weening	(Netherlands) Maarten Tjallingii	(Belgium) Sebastiën Rosseler
2007	(Netherlands) Bram Tankink	(Netherlands) Laurens ten Dam	(Belgium) Philippe Gilbert
2006	(Netherlands) Joost Posthuma	(Belgium) Philippe Gilbert	(Netherlands) Karsten Kroon
2005	(Netherlands) Bram Tankink	(Belgium) Philippe Gilbert	(Netherlands) Karsten Kroon
2004	(Netherlands) Aart Vierhouten	(Netherlands) Karsten Kroon	(Netherlands) Marc Lotz
2003	(Netherlands) Bram de Groot	(Netherlands) Servais Knaven	(Netherlands) Gerben Löwik
2002	(Netherlands) Karsten Kroon	(Netherlands) Gerben Löwik	(Belgium) Ludo Dierckxens
2001	(Belgium) Rick Verbrugghe	(Belgium) Ludo Dierckxens	(Netherlands) Max van Heeswijk
2000	(Netherlands) Max van Heeswijk	(Italy) Salvatorre Commesso	(Netherlands) Marc Lotz
1999	(Belgium) Ludo Dierckxens	(Netherlands) Marc Lotz	(Belgium) Johan Capiot
1998	(Netherlands) Léon van Bon	(Sweden) Magnus Bäckstedt	(Ukraine) Serge Oetsjakov
1997	(Germany) Erik Zabel	(Netherlands) Danny Nelissen	(Netherlands) Gerrit de Vries
1996	(Netherlands) Danny Nelissen	(Netherlands) Patrick Jonker	(Netherlands) Raymond Meys
1995	(Netherlands) Adri van der Poel	(Netherlands) Erik Dekker	(Netherlands) Raymond Meys
1994	(Belgium) Wilfried Nelissen	(Belgium) Johan Capiot	(Netherlands) Raymond Meys
1993	(Netherlands) Ad Wijnands	(Belgium) Wilfried Nelissen	(Netherlands) Patrick Strouken
1992	(Netherlands) Frans Maassen	(Italy) Claudio Chiapucci	(Netherlands) Danny Nelissen
1991	(Netherlands) Peter Stevenhaagen	(Netherlands) Frans Maassen	(Netherlands) Danny Nelissen
1990	(Netherlands) Ad Wijnands	(Netherlands) Henri Manders	(Netherlands) Gerrit Solleveld
1989	(Netherlands) Theo de Rooy	(Netherlands) Nico Verhoeven	(Netherlands) Maarten Ducrot
1988	(Netherlands) Mathieu Hermans	(Netherlands) Gerrit Solleveld	(Netherlands) Peter Harings
1987	(Belgium) Wim Arras	(Netherlands) Jean-Paul van Poppel	(Netherlands) Jan Nevens
1986	(Netherlands) Jelle Nijdam	(Netherlands) Gerard Veldschoten	(Netherlands) Nico Verhoeven
1985	(Netherlands) Joop Zoetemelk	(Netherlands) Ad Wijnands	(Netherlands) Johan Lammerts

=== Women's ===
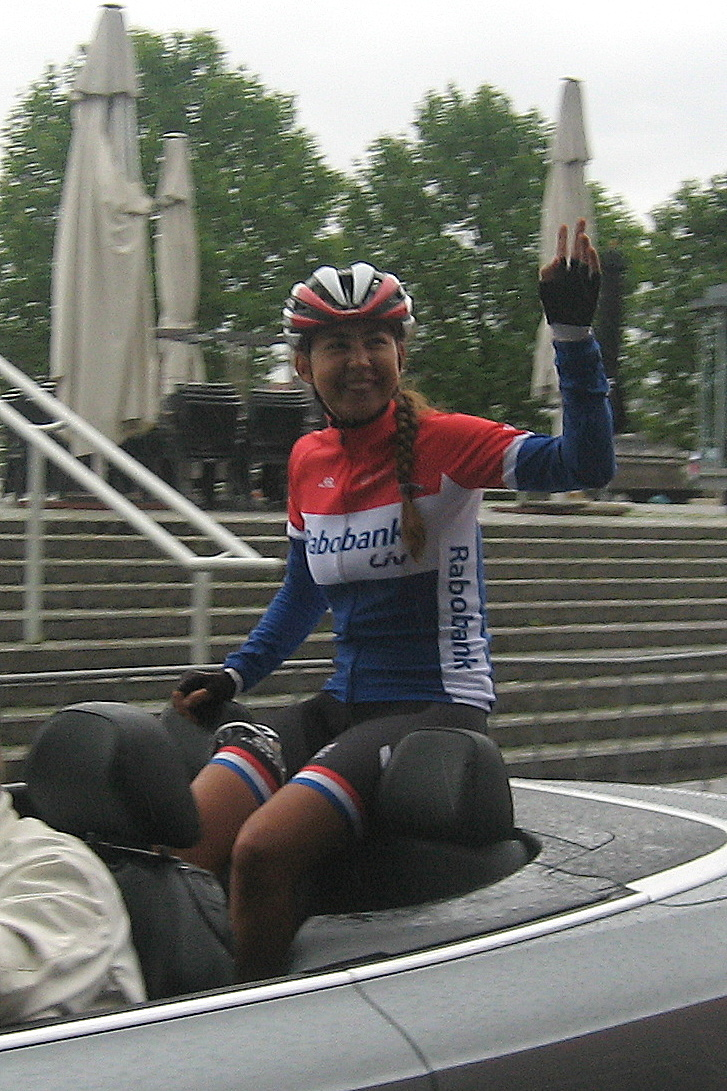
Anouska Koster in 2016.

2022	(Netherlands) Chantal van den Broek-Blaak	(Netherlands) Pauliena Rooijakkers	(Netherlands) Mischa Bredewold
2021
2020
2019	(Netherlands) Jip van den Bos	(Netherlands) Femke Markus	(Netherlands) Pauliena Rooijakkers
2018	(Netherlands) Marianne Vos	(Netherlands) Lorena Wiebes	(United States) Coryn Rivera
2017	(United States) Coryn Rivera	(Netherlands) Anouska Koster	(Canada) Karol-Ann Canuel
2016	(Netherlands) Lucinda Brand	(Netherlands) Chantal Blaak	(Netherlands) Anouk Rijff
2015	(Netherlands) Anna van der Breggen	(Belgium) Jolien D'Hoore	(Netherlands) Lucinda Brand
2014	(Netherlands) Marianne Vos	(Netherlands) Ellen van Dijk	(Netherlands) Sabrina Stultiens
2013	(Netherlands) Marianne Vos	(United Kingdom) Lizzie Armitstead	(Italy) Valentina Scandolara
2011	(Netherlands) Marianne Vos	(Netherlands) Kirsten Wild	(Netherlands) Janneke Ensing
2010	(Netherlands) Marianne Vos	(Netherlands) Kirsten Wild	(Netherlands) Noortje Tabak
2009	(Netherlands) Marianne Vos	(Netherlands) Kirsten Wild	(Netherlands) Annemiek van Vleuten
2008	(Australia) Rochelle Gilmore	(Netherlands) Marieke van Wanroij	(Netherlands) Arenda Grimberg
