= Profronde van Almelo =

Elite men's and women's professional road bicycle racing event in Almelo, Netherlands

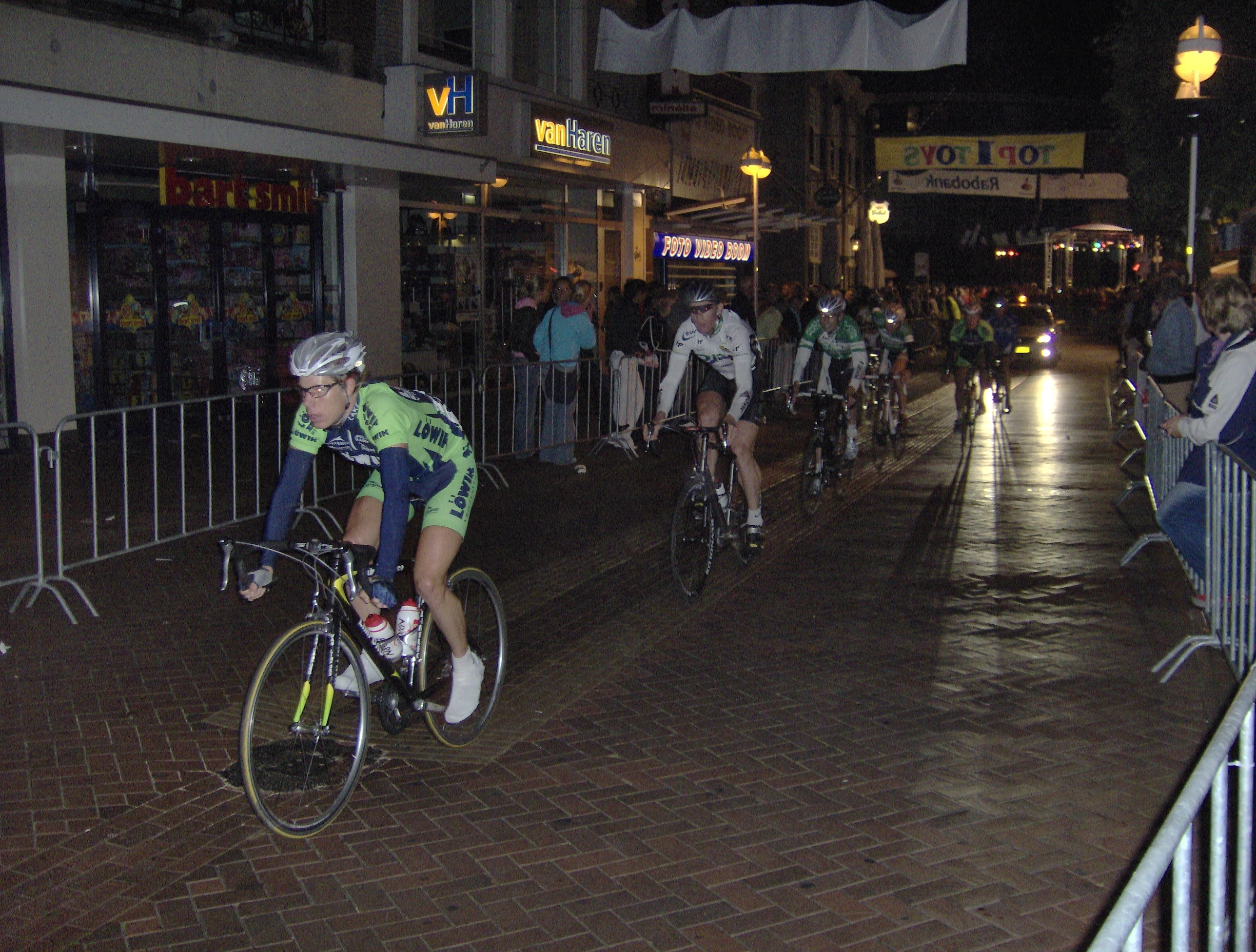
- Profronde van Almelo in 2007

Race details
- Date: August/September
- Region: Almelo, Netherlands
- English name: Prof tour of Almelo
- Local name: Profronde van Almelo (in Dutch)
- Nickname: Nacht van Almelo (English: Night of Almelo)
- Discipline: Road race
- Type: criterium
- Web site: www.profrondealmelo.nl

History
- First edition: Men: 1983; Women: 2008
- Editions: Men: 31 (as of 2012); Women: 4 (as of 2012)
- First winner: Men; Gerard Veldscholten (NED); Women; Arenda Grimberg (NED)
- Most wins: Men; Gerard Veldscholten (NED) (2 wins); Women; Arenda Grimberg (NED) (2 wins)
- Most recent: Men; Antwan Tolhoek (NED); Women; Marianne Vos (NED)

Profronde van Almelo (English: Prof tour of Almelo) is an elite men's and women's professional road bicycle racing event held annually in Almelo, Netherlands. The first edition was in 1983 and since 2008 the event also includes a women's race. In 1987 and 1988 the race was a stage within the Ronde van Nederland, a UCI category 2.1 event.

== Honours ==
=== Men's ===
Year	Winner	Second	Third
1983	Gerard Veldscholten (NED)		
1984	Seán Kelly (IRL)		
1985	Hennie Kuiper (NED)		
1986	Jos Lammertink (NED)		
1987	Marc Sergeant (BEL)		
1988	Wim Arras (BEL)		
1989	Laurent Fignon (FRA)		
1990	Peter Pieters (NED)		
1991	Gerard Veldscholten (NED)		
1992	Vjatsjeslav Jekimov (RUS)		
1993	Gerrit de Vries (NED)		
1994	Erwin Nijboer (NED)		
1995	Max van Heeswijk (NED)		
1996	Erik Dekker (NED)		
1997	Tom Steels (NED)		
1998	Robbie McEwen (AUS)		
1999	Maarten den Bakker (NED)		
2000	Servais Knaven (NED)	Erik Zabel (GER)	Jeroen Blijlevens (NED)
2001	Ludo Dierckxsens (BEL)	Stuart O'Grady (AUS)	Rudi Kemna (NED)
2002	Johan Museeuw (BEL)	Erik Dekker (NED)	Marcel Luppes (NED)
2003	Rik Reinerink (NED)	Servais Knaven (NED)	Bradley McGee (AUS)
2004	Paolo Bettini (ITA)	Erik Dekker (NED)	Rik Reinerink (NED)
2005	Bram Tankink (NED)	Michael Rasmussen (DEN)	Rudie Kemna (NED)
2006	Joost Posthuma (NED)	Bram Tankink (NED)	Robbie McEwen (AUS)
2007	Thomas Dekker (NED)	Robert Hunter (RSA)	Danilo Di Luca (ITA)
2008	Gert Steegmans (BEL)	Fränk Schleck (LUX)	Joost Posthuma (NED)
2009	Mark Cavendish (GBR)	Alessandro Petacchi (ITA)	Tom Veelers (NED)
2010	Samuel Sánchez (ESP)	Lars Boom (NED)	Albert Timmer (NED)
2011	Rob Ruijgh (NED)	André Greipel (GER)	Samuel Sánchez (ESP)
2012	Maarten Tjallingii (NED)	Stijn Devolder (BEL)	Joost Posthuma (NED)
2013	Danny van Poppel (NED)	Tom Dumoulin (NED)	Tom-Jelte Slagter (NED)
2014	Tom Veelers (NED)	Danny van Poppel (NED)	Lieuwe Westra (NED)
2015	Lars Boom (NED)	Maurits Lammertink (NED)	Bram Tankink (NED)
2016	Dylan Groenewegen (NED)	Maurits Lammertink (NED)	Stef Clement (NED)
2017	Bauke Mollema (NED)	Bram Tankink (NED)	Albert Timmer (NED)
2018	Antwan Tolhoek (NED)	Niki Terpstra (NED)	Bram Tankink (NED)

=== Women's ===
Year	Winner	Second	Third
2008	Arenda Grimberg (NED)	Andrea Bosman (NED)	Catharina Mulders (NED)
2009	Chantal Beltman (NED)	Marianne Vos (NED)	Kirsten Wild (NED)
2010	Arenda Grimberg (NED)	Loes Gunnewijk (NED)	Marianne Vos (NED)
2012	Marianne Vos (NED)	Ellen van Dijk (NED)	Kimberley van den Berg (NED)
