= Stijn Devolder =

Belgian road bicycle racer

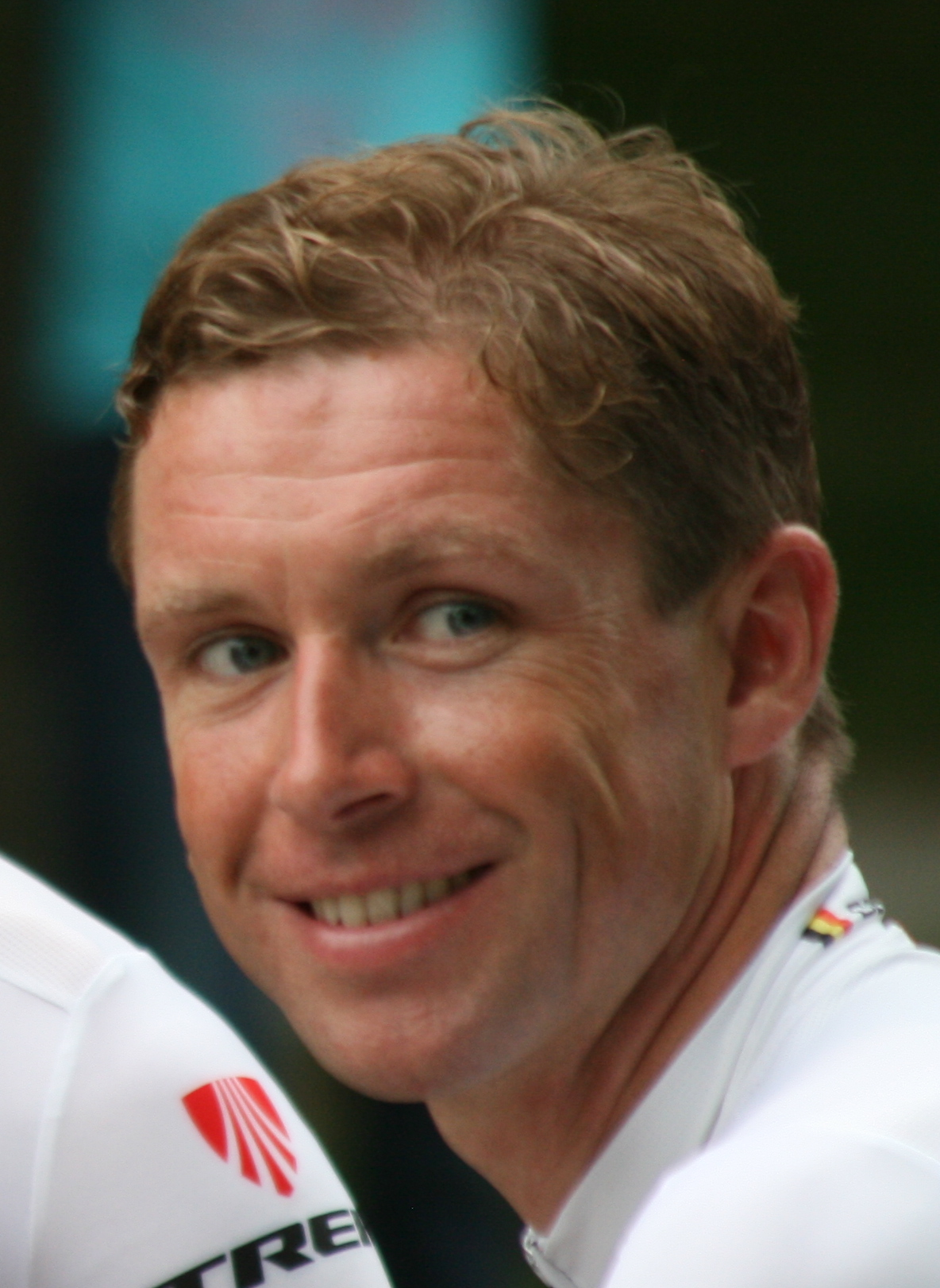
- Devolder at the 2015 Tour de France

Personal information
- Full name: Stijn Devolder
- Nickname: Volderke
- Born: 29 August 1979 (age 47) Kortrijk, Flanders, Belgium
- Height: 1.82 m (6 ft 0 in)
- Weight: 72 kg (159 lb)

Cycling career
- Sport: Cycling
- Current team: Retired
- Discipline: Road
- Role: Rider
- Rider type: Classics specialist Time-trialist

Amateur teams
- 1994–1998: Kortrijk Groeninge Spurters
- 1999–2001: Eddy Merckx Boys
- 2001: Mapei–Quick-Step (stagiaire)

Professional teams
- 2002–2003: Vlaanderen–T Interim
- 2004–2007: U.S. Postal Service
- 2008–2010: Quick-Step
- 2011–2012: Vacansoleil–DCM
- 2013–2016: RadioShack–Leopard
- 2017–2018: Vérandas Willems–Crelan
- 2019: Corendon–Circus

Major wins
- Stage races Three Days of De Panne (2005) Tour of Austria (2007) Volta ao Algarve (2008) Tour of Belgium (2008, 2010) One-day races and Classics National Road Race Championships (2007, 2010, 2013) National Time Trial Championships (2008, 2010) Tour of Flanders (2008, 2009)

Stijn Devolder (born 29 August 1979) is a Belgian former professional road bicycle racer, who competed professionally for Vlaanderen–T Interim (2002–2003), Discovery Channel (2004–2007), Quick-Step (2008–2010), Vacansoleil–DCM (2011–2012), Trek–Segafredo (2013–2016), Vérandas Willems–Crelan (2017–2018) and Corendon–Circus (2019).

Primarily a classics rider but also adept in individual time trials, Devolder took a total of eighteen victories during his professional career, including three wins in the Belgian National Road Race Championships (2007, 2010 and 2013), two wins in the Belgian National Time Trial Championships (2008 and 2010), and is one of seven riders (as of 2026) to win consecutive editions of the Tour of Flanders, winning in both 2008 and 2009.

== Career ==
=== Junior and amateur career ===
Born in Kortrijk, West Flanders, Devolder won the junior Tour of Flanders in both 1996 and 1997, and the junior Belgian National Road Race Championships in 1997. He joined the under-23 development team run by Eddy Merckx in 1999, taking eight victories over three seasons – including consecutive successes at the Grand Prix de Waregem in 2000 and 2001. Towards the end of the 2001 season, Devolder rode for the Mapei–Quick-Step team as a stagiaire, forming part of a breakaway group during the GP Ouest-France.

=== Professional career ===
==== Vlaanderen–T Interim (2002–2003) ====
Devolder turned professional for the 2002 season with the Vlaanderen–T Interim team. In his first season with the team, Devolder finished second in the GP de Fayt-le-Franc and Zellik–Galmaarden one-day races. The following year, Devolder finished third in the E3 Prijs Vlaanderen – one of the cobbled classics – having attacked as part of a three-rider move inside the final 30 kilometres (19 miles) of the race.

==== U.S. Postal Service (2004–2007) ====
Devolder joined U.S. Postal Service for the 2004 season, and in his second start with the team, finished third in the Tour du Haut Var from a group sprint of four riders. He finished sixth in the Three Days of De Panne in the spring, before taking his first professional victory at the Four Days of Dunkirk, taking a solo win on the fourth stage into Boulogne-sur-Mer. The following year, he won the general classification at the Three Days of De Panne, overturning a four-second deficit to Alessandro Ballan on the final stage, a 13.7-kilometre (8.5-mile) individual time trial around De Panne. He also contested a Grand Tour for the first time, riding for the now-renamed Discovery Channel team at the Vuelta a España. Having been unable to defend his title at the Three Days of De Panne, Devolder took his only victory of the 2006 season in an individual time trial stage at the Tour of Belgium – as part of a Discovery Channel 1–2–3 in Buggenhout. He rode the Vuelta a España for the second year in a row, recording his best Grand Tour result with eleventh place overall, finishing just over a minute behind the top ten placings.

In 2007, Devolder won the final individual time trial stage at the Three Days of De Panne, before he finished third overall at the Tour de Suisse, having advanced from seventh prior to the final stage, an individual time trial around Bern. The following week, Devolder won his first senior national title as he won the Belgian National Road Race Championships in Ronse, following a 10-kilometre (6.2-mile) solo move. He wore the jersey for the first time at the Tour of Austria where, after a fourth-place stage finish at the Kitzbüheler Horn on stage three, Devolder took the race lead when he won the penultimate stage – a 25-kilometre (16-mile) individual time trial in Podersdorf am See – by almost a minute. He ultimately won the race by more than a minute from the next closest competitor, Thomas Rohregger. At the Vuelta a España, Devolder finished third on the fourth and eighth stages, moving into the race leader's jersey as a result; he ultimately ceded the lead after one day, losing five minutes to Denis Menchov on the summit finish at the Cerler ski station. Devolder ultimately abandoned the race as he failed to start stage 19, having lost 27 minutes on the previous stage due to a crash.

==== Quick-Step (2008–2010) ====
Devolder joined Quick-Step for the 2008 season, following the disbanding of the Discovery Channel team. He took his first victories with the team at the Volta ao Algarve; he won the fourth stage individual time trial by twenty-two seconds to take the overall race lead, which he held to the finish the following day. Moving into the cobbled classics, Devolder was expected to be a key helper for teammate Tom Boonen at the Tour of Flanders, but he attacked with 25 kilometres (16 miles) remaining and ultimately soloed to victory in Meerbeke. He was designated the same role at Paris–Roubaix, and he finished in seventh place as Boonen won the race. Following a break from racing, Devolder won the general classification in his next start at the Tour of Belgium; he finished second to Greg Van Avermaet on stage three, before winning the stage four individual time trial to take the race lead, which he held to the end of the race along with the mountains classification. He ran as high as fourth overall at the Tour de Suisse, before making his first start at the Tour de France, where he led the Quick-Step team. Seventh overall after nine stages, Devolder cracked on stage ten and lost twelve minutes to the main general classification contenders, before abandoning on stage fifteen. Aside from a fourth-place finish at the Eneco Tour, Devolder's best results over the remainder of the season came in individual time trials as he won his first Belgian National Time Trial Championships in Mouscron, and he finished sixth in the time trial at the UCI Road World Championships in Italy.

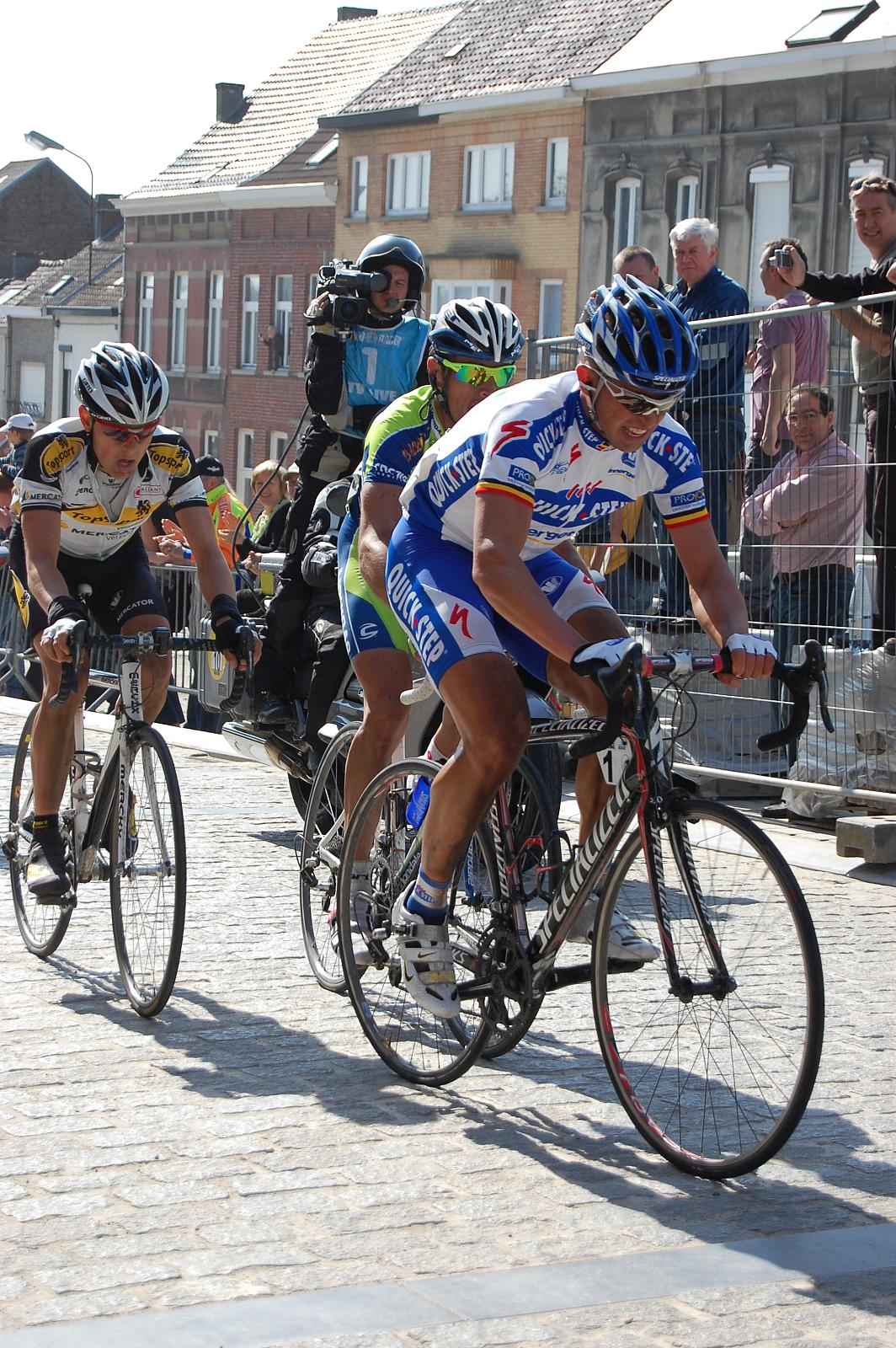
Devolder leading a group of riders at the 2009 Tour of Flanders, a race he won for the second year in a row

Having extended his contract with the team for a further two years, Devolder recorded top-ten placings in the early part of the 2009 season at Dwars door Vlaanderen and E3 Prijs Vlaanderen – finishing fifth and sixth respectively – after attacking moves in both races. He then repeated his victory at the Tour of Flanders; having bridged up to the lead group on the ascent of the Valkenberg with Boonen and Filippo Pozzato, Devolder attacked on the penultimate hill, the Muur van Geraardsbergen, and ultimately won the race in Meerbeke by approximately one minute. He took no further victories over the remainder of the year, his best result being a fourth-place finish at the Belgian National Time Trial Championships in Saint-Ghislain, following a crash.

Devolder won the Tour of Belgium for the second time in three years in 2010, becoming one of the joint-record holders for most wins at the time; having entered the final stage third overall and four seconds in arrears of race leader Dominique Cornu, Devolder and Ben Hermans broke clear from the lead group on a hilly stage around Herstal – which included the Côte de La Redoute – with Hermans ultimately winning the stage and Devolder the general classification. He then won the Belgian National Road Race Championships for the second time in June, making a solo attack with 11 kilometres (6.8 miles) remaining before the finish in Leuven; he later added a second Belgian National Time Trial Championships win in August, finishing 40 seconds clear of his next closest competitor in Habay as he became the first male rider to win both national titles in the same year.

==== Vacansoleil–DCM (2011–2012) ====
Devolder joined the Vacansoleil–DCM team for the 2011 season, signing a two-year contract. Devolder's time at the team brought no podium finishes, with two top-ten overall placings – a seventh-place finish at the 2011 Chrono des Nations, and an eighth-place finish at the 2012 Three Days of De Panne. With the team displeased at his performances, Devolder's contract was not extended beyond the end of 2012.

==== RadioShack–Leopard (2013–2016) ====
Out of contract with Vacansoleil–DCM, Devolder joined RadioShack–Leopard on an initial two-year contract from the 2013 season onwards. He rode in support of Fabian Cancellara in the classic cycle races, with Cancellara winning both the Tour of Flanders and Paris–Roubaix. Devolder then won the Belgian National Road Race Championships for the third time in his career with a 25-kilometre (16-mile) solo attack, as he finished almost a minute clear of his rivals. Following this success, Devolder signed a two-year contract extension until the end of the 2015 season, as the team evolved into Trek Factory Racing.

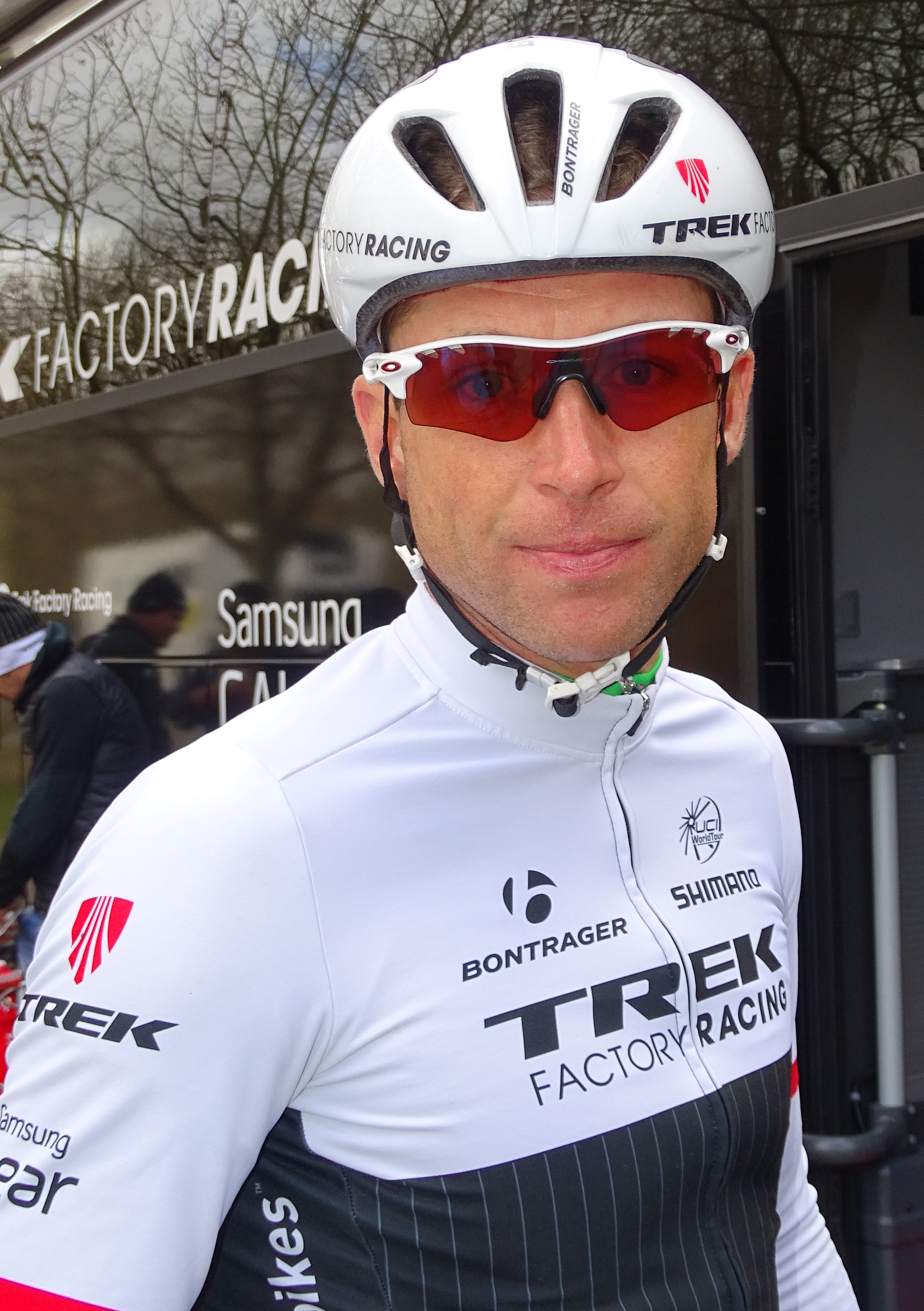
Devolder at the 2015 Three Days of De Panne, where he finished second overall

At the start of the 2014 season, Devolder finished fourth overall at the Driedaagse van West-Vlaanderen, before he was seen to be an outsider for the Tour of Flanders, albeit riding in support of Cancellara. Cancellara would go on to win the event, while Devolder crashed multiple times during the race, suffering minor injuries that would ultimately rule him out of the following weekend's Paris–Roubaix. In 2015, Devolder finished second overall at the Three Days of De Panne; having made a front split of six riders on the opening stage – finishing third – Devolder moved up to second following the withdrawal of Jens Debusschere and maintained the position to the end. After a further one-year contract extension for 2016, Devolder rode in a support role for the team and recorded no top-20 individual finishes, and was not offered a contract for the 2017 season.

==== Final seasons (2017–2019) ====
Devolder signed an initial one-year contract with Vérandas Willems–Crelan for the 2017 season, dropping to UCI Professional Continental level. His best result of the season came with a fourth-place result at the Rad am Ring, with his teammates Huub Duyn and Wout van Aert finishing first and second. He prolonged his contract for a further year in 2018, supporting Van Aert in the classic cycle races. He had been expecting to retire at the end of the year, but was offered a spot at Corendon–Circus for 2019, to ride alongside Van Aert's main cyclo-cross rival Mathieu van der Poel. He took no additional victories, and in November 2019, announced his retirement from the peloton.

== Major results ==
1996
1st Tour of Flanders Juniors
National Junior Road Championships

2nd Road race
2nd Time trial

1997
1st Road race, National Junior Road Championships
1st Tour of Flanders Juniors
3rd Liège–La Gleize
1999
Vuelta a Navarra

1st Stages 5 & 6

2nd Tour of Flanders U23
2000
1st Overall Le Triptyque des Monts et Châteaux

1st Stage 2b (ITT)

1st Grand Prix de Waregem
2nd Time trial, National Under-23 Road Championships
4th Zesbergenprijs Harelbeke
2001
1st Zesbergenprijs Harelbeke
1st De Vlaamse Pijl
1st Grand Prix de Waregem
5th Time trial, National Under-23 Road Championships
7th GP Wielerrevue
2002
2nd GP de Fayt-le-Franc
2nd Zellik–Galmaarden
2003
3rd E3 Prijs Vlaanderen
6th GP Stad Vilvoorde
8th Grand Prix Pino Cerami
2004
1st Stage 4 Four Days of Dunkirk
3rd Tour du Haut Var
6th Overall Three Days of De Panne
2005
1st Overall Three Days of De Panne
2006
1st Stage 3a (ITT) Tour of Belgium
2nd Eindhoven Team Time Trial
4th Japan Cup
6th Halle–Ingooigem
8th Overall Three Days of De Panne
8th Overall Deutschland Tour
2007
1st Road race, National Road Championships
1st Overall Tour of Austria

1st Stage 7 (ITT)

1st Stage 4 (ITT) Three Days of De Panne
3rd Overall Tour de Suisse
9th Trofeo Pollença
2008
1st Time trial, National Road Championships
1st Overall Tour of Belgium

1st Mountains classification
1st Stage 4 (ITT)

1st Overall Volta ao Algarve

1st Stage 4 (ITT)

1st Tour of Flanders
4th Overall Eneco Tour
6th Time trial, UCI Road World Championships
7th Overall Circuit Franco-Belge
7th Paris–Roubaix
9th E3 Prijs Vlaanderen
10th Trofeo Pollença
2009
1st Tour of Flanders
5th Dwars door Vlaanderen
6th E3 Prijs Vlaanderen
2010
National Road Championships

1st Road race
1st Time trial

1st Overall Tour of Belgium
4th Halle–Ingooigem
2011
7th Chrono des Nations
2012
8th Overall Three Days of De Panne
2013
1st Road race, National Road Championships
8th Brabantse Pijl
2014
4th Overall Driedaagse van West-Vlaanderen
2015
2nd Overall Three Days of De Panne
2017
4th Rad am Ring

=== Grand Tour general classification results timeline ===
Grand Tour	2005	2006	2007	2008	2009	2010	2011	2012	2013	2014	2015
Giro d'Italia	Did not contest during his career										
Tour de France	—	—	—	DNF	79	—	—	—	—	—	148
/ Vuelta a España	25	11	DNF	—	85	—	153	—	—	—	—

=== Classics results timeline ===
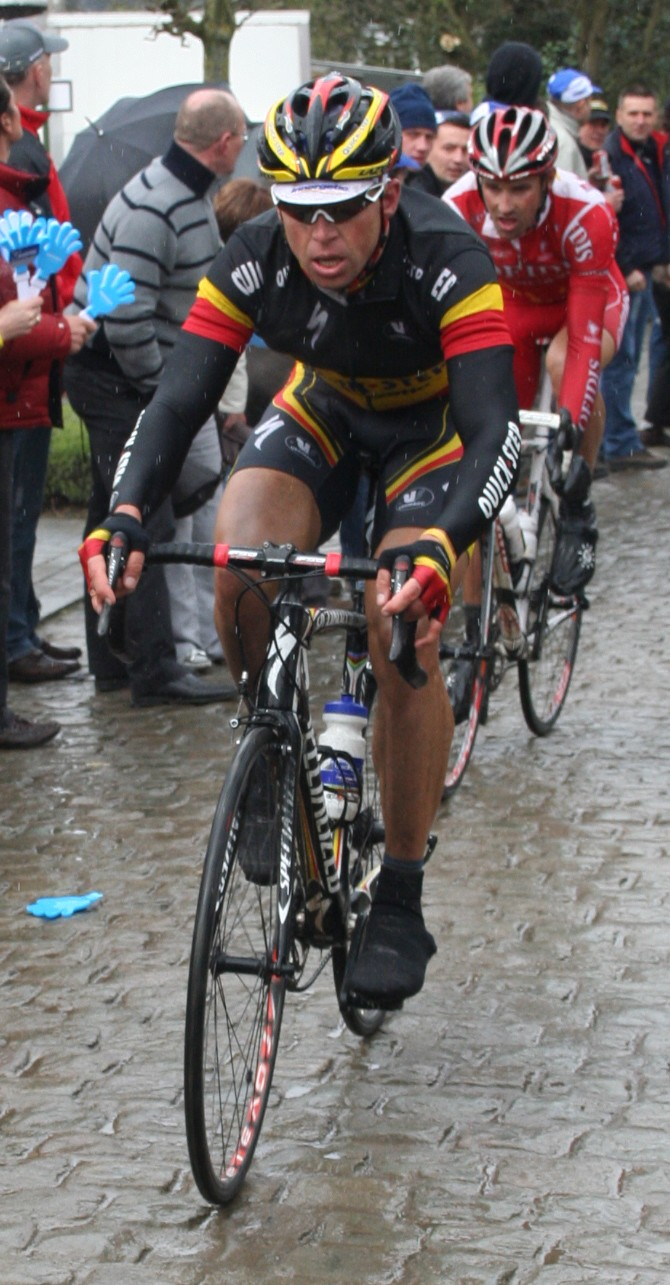
Devolder at the 2008 Tour of Flanders, where he won the first of his two cycling monuments

Monument	2002	2003	2004	2005	2006	2007	2008	2009	2010	2011	2012	2013	2014	2015	2016	2017	2018	2019
Milan–San Remo	—	—	—	60	—	—	—	—	—	—	—	—	—	—	—	—	—	—
Tour of Flanders	DNF	53	21	35	DNF	43	1	1	25	55	DNF	58	86	13	94	109	DNF	51
Paris–Roubaix	—	—	91	DNF	DNF	18	7	55	42	105	58	54	—	DNF	DNF	—	DNF	—
Liège–Bastogne–Liège	—	—	—	111	—	DNF	—	—	136	DNF	111	—	—	—	—	—	—	—
Giro di Lombardia	—	—	—	41	61	—	—	—	—	DNF	—	—	—	—	—	—	—	—
Classic	2002	2003	2004	2005	2006	2007	2008	2009	2010	2011	2012	2013	2014	2015	2016	2017	2018	2019
Omloop Het Nieuwsblad	—	45	NH	40	85	DNF	69	73	131	61	54	—	—	—	—	60	74	27
Kuurne–Brussels–Kuurne	—	DNF	37	27	87	93	15	23	DNF	DNF	105	NH	—	—	—	50	79	—
Dwars door Vlaanderen	DNF	67	34	81	41	35	61	5	80	38	92	62	51	DNF	97	70	DNF	56
E3 Harelbeke	104	3	18	39	32	13	9	6	40	50	45	29	20	62	49	44	70	—
Gent–Wevelgem	DNF	DNF	—	DNF	94	116	63	DNF	—	—	—	DNF	61	—	—	—	67	DNF
Scheldeprijs	—	—	—	—	—	—	—	—	35	90	—	118	—	96	126	32	—	—
Brabantse Pijl	—	—	—	—	—	—	—	—	—	36	—	8	—	—	—	77	—	60

Legend
—	Did not compete
DNF	Did not finish
NH	Not held
