= Heinrich Haussler =

Australian road bicycle racer

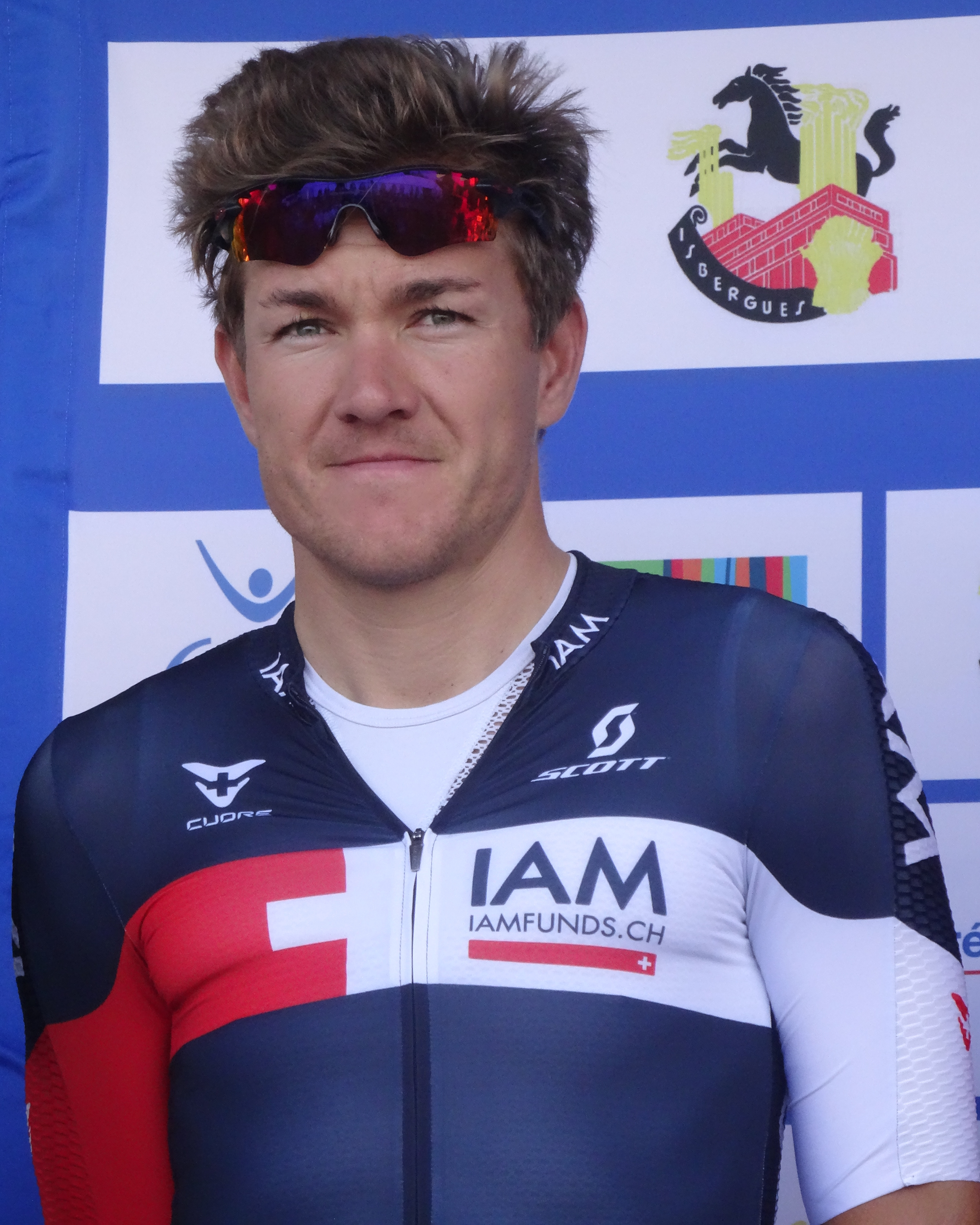
- Haussler in 2014

Personal information
- Full name: Heinrich Haussler
- Nicknames: Beans, Barbie, Heino
- Born: 25 February 1984 (age 42) Inverell, New South Wales, Australia
- Height: 1.79 m (5 ft 10 in)
- Weight: 71 kg (157 lb)

Cycling career
- Sport: Cycling
- Disciplines: Road; Cyclo-cross
- Role: Rider
- Rider type: Sprinter; Classics specialist

Professional teams
- 2005–2008: Gerolsteiner
- 2009–2010: Cervélo TestTeam
- 2011–2012: Garmin–Cervélo
- 2013–2016: IAM Cycling
- 2017–2023: Bahrain–Merida

Major wins
- Grand Tours Tour de France 1 individual stage (2009) Vuelta a España 1 individual stage (2005) One-day races and Classics National Road Race Championships (2015)

Heinrich Haussler (born 25 February 1984) is an Australian former road racing cyclist of German heritage, who competed as a professional from 2004 to April 2023. He won 2 stages in Grand Tours during his career, one at the 2005 Vuelta a España and another at the 2009 Tour de France. He was also a good Classics specialist, registering top results in notable classic races, and was the 2015 Australian national road race champion. He was the winner of the 2022 UAE Al Salam championship.

== Biography ==
=== Early life ===
Haussler was born to a German father and Australian mother and raised in the town of Inverell, New South Wales, Australia, before leaving for Germany in 1998 at age 14 to pursue a dream of being a professional cyclist.

=== Professional career ===
Haussler turned professional in 2005 and shot to prominence with a stage win in the 2005 Vuelta a España. Haussler took out five wins in 2006 and has had strong classics campaigns since then. He looked set to be a rider of the future in the classics, in 2009 coming in second in both the Tour of Flanders and Milan–San Remo, narrowly beaten in the latter by Mark Cavendish in a photo-finish. He also finished a strong 7th in the 2009 edition of Paris–Roubaix. Haussler's biggest victory was Stage 13 in the 2009 Tour de France. Haussler lived in Cottbus starting in 1998, and in 2009 in Freiburg im Breisgau.

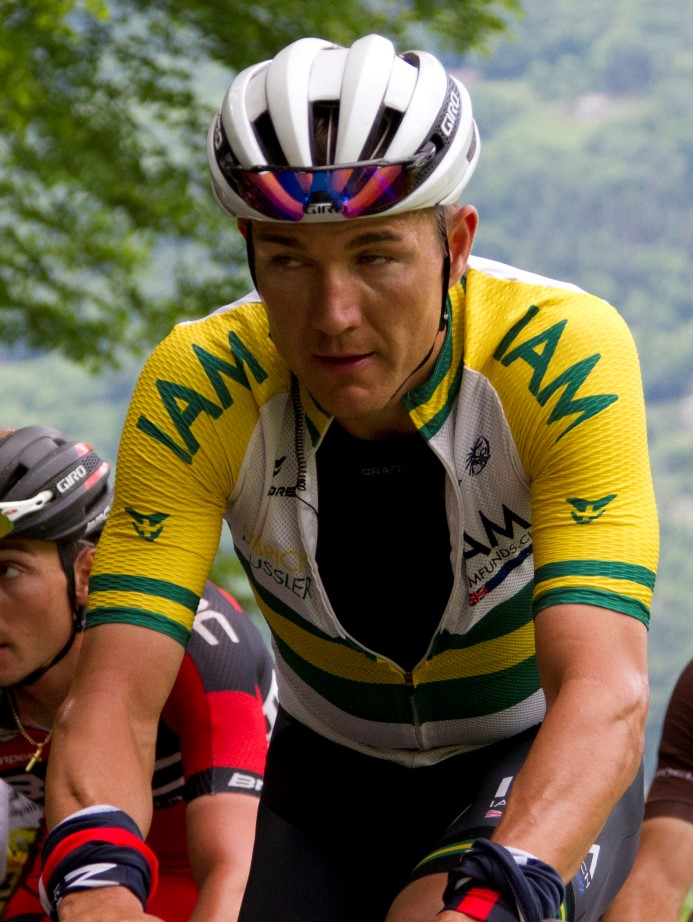
Haussler riding in the Australian national champion's jersey in the 2015 Giro d'Italia

A dual Australian/German national, Haussler originally raced under a German license. However, in a 2008 interview on CyclingNews.com, he suggested that he would no longer race for Germany as he wished to compete for Australia in the 2010 UCI Road World Championships in Melbourne. When asked what he would do if chosen to race for Germany in the 2008 UCI Road World Championships or at the 2008 Olympics he stated, "I wouldn't take it. If you start for a country at the worlds there is a three-year ban before you can ride for another." The UCI, however, insisted that if Haussler wanted to ride for Australia he would have to give up his German citizenship, which the cyclist said in a November 2009 interview "is not open for debate at the moment".

In July 2010, the Cervélo Test Team announced that Haussler would indeed give up his German citizenship and will ride for Australia in the future. However, a nagging knee injury forced Haussler out of what would have been his international cycling debut for his birth country at the 2010 World Championships.

On 26 August 2010, Haussler's employer, Cervélo Test Team, confirmed rumours that it would cease to exist after the end of the current season. On 1 September 2010, it was announced he would be joining the Garmin–Cervélo for 2011.

In the 2012 Tour of California, Haussler was denied victory on the four first stages of the race by Peter Sagan of the Liquigas–Cannondale squad, who beat him to the line each time. He would have to settle for second on every one of those stages.

Haussler left Garmin–Sharp at the end of the 2012 season, and joined the new IAM Cycling team for the 2013 season. In 2015 he won the Australian National Road Race Championships for the first time in his career.

He also began competing in cyclo-cross in 2019, and competed in the 2021 UCI Cyclo-cross World Championships.

== Major results ==
2002
1st Time trial, German National Junior Road Championships
2005
1st Stage 19 Vuelta a España
3rd Overall Sachsen Tour
7th Overall Niedersachsen Rundfahrt
7th Züri-Metzgete
2006
Vuelta a Murcia

1st Points classification
1st Stages 1 & 5

Circuit Franco-Belge

1st Stages 2 & 4

1st Stage 3 Rheinland-Pfalz Rundfahrt
3rd Trofeo Mallorca
6th Clásica de Almería
2007
1st Stage 1 Critérium du Dauphiné Libéré
4th Overall Niedersachsen Rundfahrt

1st Stage 5

10th Rund um den Henninger Turm
2008
1st Stage 1 Bayern Rundfahrt
9th Gent–Wevelgem
2009
1st GP Triberg-Schwarzwald
Tour de France

1st Stage 13
Combativity award Stage 13

Volta ao Algarve

1st Stages 1 & 5

1st Stage 2 Paris–Nice
2nd Overall Tour of Qatar

1st Sprints classification
1st Young rider classification

2nd Milan–San Remo
2nd Tour of Flanders
2nd Neuseen Classics
3rd Grand Prix of Aargau Canton
4th Dwars door Vlaanderen
4th Sparkassen Giro Bochum
6th Overall Tour du Poitou-Charentes

1st Stage 5

6th Paris–Roubaix
8th Omloop Het Nieuwsblad
2010
1st Stage 2 Tour de Suisse
2nd Omloop Het Nieuwsblad
3rd Grand Prix of Aargau Canton
9th Overall Tour of Qatar

1st Sprints classification

2011
1st Stage 2 Tour of Beijing
1st Points classification Paris–Nice
2nd Overall Tour of Qatar

1st Points classification
1st Stages 2 & 3

7th E3 Prijs Vlaanderen
2012
3rd GP Ouest–France
4th Omloop Het Nieuwsblad
7th Vattenfall Cyclassics
2013
1st Stage 5 Bayern Rundfahrt
4th Gent–Wevelgem
4th Paris–Bourges
6th Tour of Flanders
6th Paris–Tours
2014
1st Stage 1 Bayern Rundfahrt
3rd Grand Prix d'Isbergues
5th Paris–Tours
2015
1st Road race, Australian National Road Championships
5th Down Under Classic
7th Paris–Tours
8th Overall Tour of Qatar
9th Grand Prix of Aargau Canton
10th Cadel Evans Great Ocean Road Race
2016
6th Paris–Roubaix
7th Milan–San Remo
2019
10th Dwars door Vlaanderen
2020
5th Overall Saudi Tour
2021
4th Omloop Het Nieuwsblad
10th Paris–Roubaix
2022
10th Classic Brugge–De Panne

=== Grand Tour general classification results timeline ===
Grand Tour	2005	2006	2007	2008	2009	2010	2011	2012	2013	2014	2015	2016	2017	2018	2019	2020	2021	2022
Giro d'Italia	—	—	—	—	—	—	—	—	—	—	107	99	—	—	—	—	—	—
Tour de France	—	—	128	124	94	—	—	—	—	DNF	—	—	—	125	—	—	—	
/ Vuelta a España	54	92	—	DNF	—	—	102	—	—	—	—	—	—	—	132	—	—	

=== Classics & Monuments results timeline ===
Monument	2005	2006	2007	2008	2009	2010	2011	2012	2013	2014	2015	2016	2017	2018	2019	2020	2021	2022
Milan–San Remo	—	35	—	129	2	—	18	68	13	68	80	7	—	33	106	—	157	—
Tour of Flanders	89	DNF	107	90	2	—	61	30	6	—	26	DNF	—	25	33	—	20	DNF
Paris–Roubaix	25	73	DNF	58	6	—	DNF	32	11	91	80	6	—	20	14	NH	10	—
Liège–Bastogne–Liège	Has not contested during his career																	
Giro di Lombardia	DNF	—	—	—	—	—	—	—	—	—	—	—	—	—	—	—	—	
Classic	2005	2006	2007	2008	2009	2010	2011	2012	2013	2014	2015	2016	2017	2018	2019	2020	2021	2022
Omloop Het Nieuwsblad	—	—	—	DNF	8	2	—	4	19	79	33	66	—	—	—	22	4	22
Kuurne–Brussels–Kuurne	—	—	—	—	12	DNF	—	—	NH	12	—	80	—	77	—	39	32	41
Dwars door Vlaanderen	—	—	—	—	4	—	43	102	—	—	—	—	—	23	10	NH	18	108
E3 Harelbeke	—	—	DNF	DNF	16	DNF	7	93	11	81	84	16	—	19	59	NH	31	25
Gent–Wevelgem	—	11	—	9	DNF	—	—	—	4	DNF	DNF	DNF	—	49	DNF	—	29	50
Hamburg Cyclassics	56	—	DNF	—	—	—	—	7	—	—	59	18	15	—	—	Not held		
Bretagne Classic	—	—	DNF	—	DNF	—	—	3	—	29	13	11	85	—	—	—	—	
Paris–Tours	42	—	DNF	56	—	—	—	—	6	5	7	—	—	—	—	—	—	

Legend
—	Did not compete
DNF	Did not finish
DSQ	Disqualified
NH	Not held
