= 2009 Dwars door Vlaanderen =

Race details
- Dates: 25 March 2009
- Stages: 1
- Distance: 200 km (124.3 mi)
- Winning time: 4h 52' 55"

Results
	Winner	Kevin van Impe (BEL)
	Second	Niko Eeckhout (BEL)
	Third	Tom Boonen (BEL)

The 2009 Dwars door Vlaanderen was the 64th edition of the Dwars door Vlaanderen cycle race and was held on 25 March 2009. The race started in Roeselare and finished in Waregem. The race was won by Kevin van Impe.

== General classification ==
Final general classification

Rank	Rider	Time
1	Kevin van Impe (BEL)	4h 52' 55"
2	Niko Eeckhout (BEL)	+ 2"
3	Tom Boonen (BEL)	+ 14"
4	Heinrich Haussler (AUS)	+ 16"
5	Stijn Devolder (BEL)	+ 48"
6	Yauheni Hutarovich (BLR)	+ 1' 51"
7	Sylvain Chavanel (FRA)	+ 1' 51"
8	Mathew Hayman (AUS)	+ 1' 51"
9	Wouter Weylandt (BEL)	+ 1' 51"
10	Kristof Goddaert (BEL)	+ 1' 51"
