= Bram Tankink =

Dutch road bicycle racer

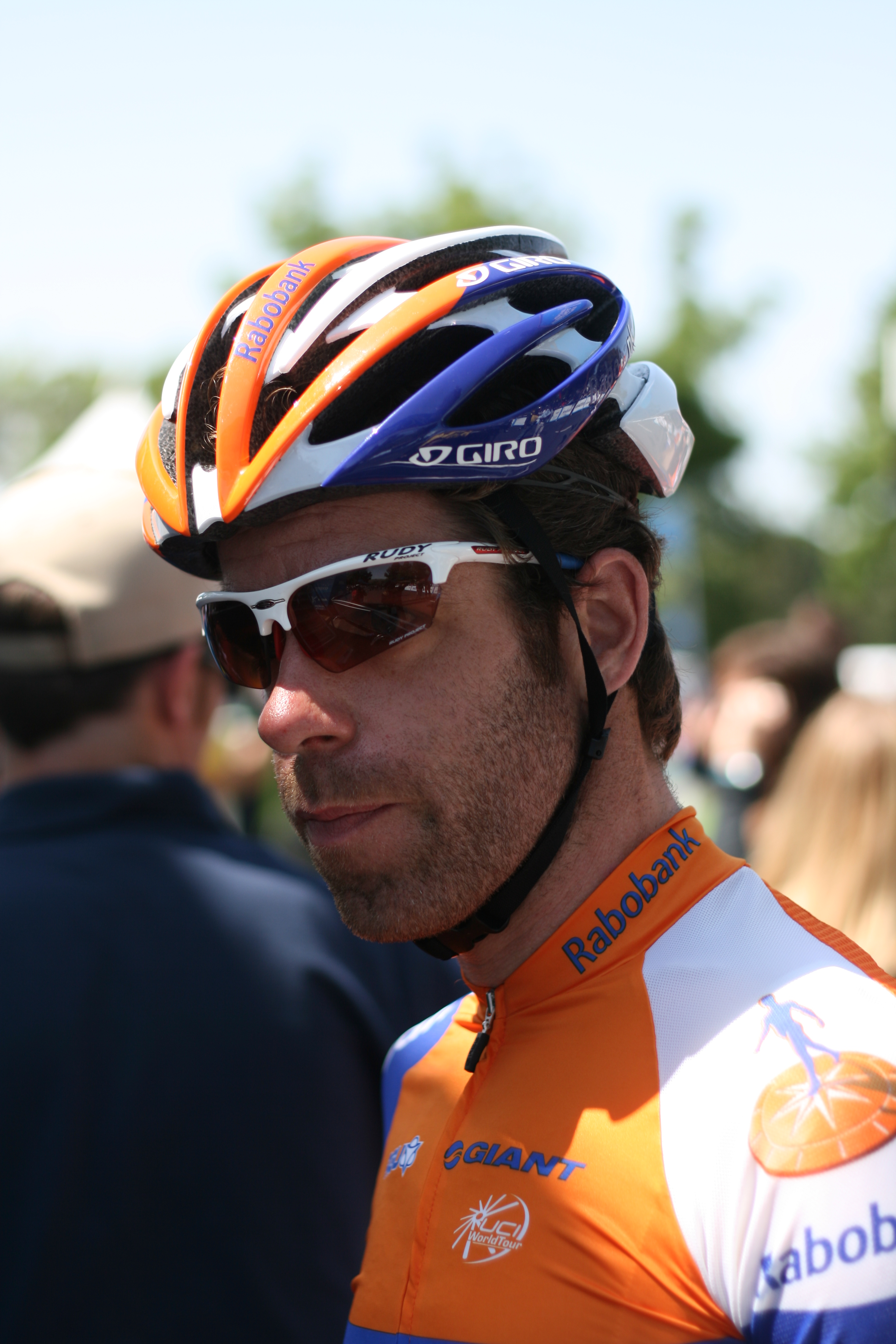
- Tankink at the 2012 Tour of California

Personal information
- Full name: Bram Tankink
- Nicknames: The Tank; The Beast from the East
- Born: 3 December 1978 (age 47) Haaksbergen, the Netherlands
- Height: 1.81 m (5 ft 11 in)
- Weight: 71 kg (157 lb; 11.2 st)

Cycling career
- Sport: Cycling
- Discipline: Road
- Role: Rider

Amateur team
- 2000: Cyclingteam Tegeltoko

Professional teams
- 2001–2002: Domo–Farm Frites–Latexco
- 2003–2007: Quick-Step–Davitamon
- 2008–2018: Rabobank

Bram Tankink (born 3 December 1978) is a Dutch former professional road bicycle racer, who competed between 2000 and 2018 for the Löwik Meubelen–Tegeltoko, Domo–Farm Frites, Quick-Step–Innergetic and LottoNL–Jumbo squads.

Born in Haaksbergen, Tankink started his career as a mountain biker, but in 1999 he became a road rider. In 2000 he became Dutch champion of the espoirs which resulted in a professional contract for 2001 at Domo–Farm Frites–Latexco. He stayed with this team for two years until he and a few others from this team went over to Quick-Step–Davitamon. Tankink usually acted as a helper in this team, hardly ever racing for his own success; but he was so much appreciated that the team allowed him to participate in the 2005 Tour de France which he finished in good form. After the Tour he played an important part in the victory of Filippo Pozzato at the 2005 HEW Cyclassics in Hamburg and during the 2005 Deutschland Tour he won the first stage from Attenburg to Plauen. Tankink also won several criteriums after the Tour de France.

Tankink joined Rabobank in 2008. He remained with the team until his retirement in 2018.

== Major results ==
1999
3rd Overall Turul Romaniei
2000
1st Road race, National Under-23 Road Championships
2nd Overall Mainfranken-Tour
2nd Overall Ster der Beloften
5th Rund um den Henninger Turm U23
8th Overall Le Triptyque des Monts et Châteaux
8th Overall Grand Prix Guillaume Tell
2004
6th Japan Cup
8th Tour du Haut Var
2005
1st Profronde van Maastricht
1st Profronde van Almelo
1st Stage 1 Deutschland Tour
3rd Profronde van Stiphout
3rd Profronde van Oostvoorne
2006
1st Mijl van Mares
2nd Profronde van Almelo
3rd GP Buchholz
3rd Profronde van Stiphout
7th Tour du Haut Var
2007
1st Grote Prijs Jef Scherens
1st Profronde van Maastricht
3rd Acht van Chaam
7th Overall Eneco Tour
8th Grand Prix de Fourmies
2008
1st Profronde van Wierden
2nd Profronde van Zwolle
3rd Profronde van Heerlen
5th Overall Tour of Belgium
8th Overall Eneco Tour
8th Trofeo Calvia
8th Grand Prix de Wallonie
10th Overall Vuelta a Andalucía
2009
3rd Profronde van Zwolle
8th Overall Ster Elektrotoer
2010
3rd Overall Tour of Belgium
2011
1st Sprints classification, Tour of the Basque Country
1st Stage 1 (TTT) Tirreno–Adriatico
2nd Road race, National Road Championships
5th E3 Prijs Vlaanderen
5th Brabantse Pijl
5th Omloop van het Houtland
2013
9th Ruddervoorde Koerse
2014
6th Druivenkoers Overijse
6th Omloop van het Houtland

=== Grand Tour general classification results timeline ===
Grand Tour	2002	2003	2004	2005	2006	2007	2008	2009	2010	2011	2012	2013	2014	2015	2016	2017
Giro d'Italia	—	—	—	—	—	—	—	—	—	35	—	—	—	—	61	DNF
Tour de France	—	—	—	111	93	40	59	—	DNF	—	144	64	40	55	—	—
Vuelta a España	DNF	94	64	—	—	—	—	34	—	—	—	—	—	—	103	—

Legend
—	Did not compete
DNF	Did not finish
