= 2012 Three Days of De Panne =

2012 UCI Europe Tour

Race details
- Dates: 27–29 March
- Stages: 4
- Distance: 544.5 km (338.3 mi)

Results
	Winner	Sylvain Chavanel (FRA)	(Omega Pharma–Quick-Step)
	Second	Lieuwe Westra (NED)	(Vacansoleil–DCM)
	Third	Maciej Bodnar (POL)	(Liquigas–Cannondale)
	Points	Alexander Kristoff (NOR)	(Team Katusha)
	Mountains	Tosh Van Der Sande (BEL)	(Lotto–Belisol)

The 2012 Three Days of De Panne (Dutch: KBC Driedaagse van De Panne-Koksijde 2012) is the 36th edition of the Three Days of De Panne, an annual bicycle race. Taking part in and around the De Panne region of West Flanders, it began in Middelkerke on 27 March and will finish in De Panne two days later. The 544.5 km long stage race contains four stages, with two held on the final day. It is part of the 2012 UCI Europe Tour and is rated as a 2.HC event.

== Teams ==
24 teams were invited to participate in the tour: 10 UCI ProTeams and 14 UCI Professional Continental Teams.

UCI ProTeams
- RadioShack–Nissan
- Lotto–Belisol
- Omega Pharma–Quick-Step
- GreenEDGE
- Vacansoleil–DCM
- Team Katusha
- Lampre–ISD
- Astana
- FDJ–BigMat
- Liquigas–Cannondale
UCI Professional Continental Teams
- Project 1t4i
- Team Type 1–Sanofi
- Colnago–CSF Bardiani
- Farnese Vini–Selle Italia
- Team NetApp
- Acqua & Sapone
- Topsport Vlaanderen–Mercator
- Accent.jobs–Willems Veranda's
- Landbouwkrediet–Euphony
- Team Europcar
- UnitedHealthcare
- RusVelo
- SpiderTech–C10
- Champion System

== Stages ==
=== Stage 1 ===
27 March 2011 – Middelkerke to Oudenaarde, 201.6 km (125.3 mi)

Stage 1 Result
	Rider	Team	Time
1	Peter Sagan (SVK)	Liquigas–Cannondale	4h 33' 41"
2	Jacopo Guarnieri (ITA)	Astana	s.t.
3	Fabio Sabatini (ITA)	Liquigas–Cannondale	s.t.
4	Alexander Kristoff (NOR)	Team Katusha	s.t.
5	Elia Favilli (ITA)	Farnese Vini–Selle Italia	s.t.
6	Marcel Sieberg (GER)	Lotto–Belisol	s.t.
7	Baptiste Planckaert (BEL)	Landbouwkrediet–Euphony	s.t.
8	Tom Van Asbroeck (BEL)	Topsport Vlaanderen–Mercator	s.t.
9	Yauheni Hutarovich (BLR)	FDJ–BigMat	s.t.
10	Sébastien Turgot (FRA)	Team Europcar	s.t.

General Classification after Stage 1
	Rider	Team	Time
1	Peter Sagan (SVK)	Liquigas–Cannondale	4h 33' 31"
2	Jacopo Guarnieri (ITA)	Astana	+ 4"
3	Fabio Sabatini (ITA)	Liquigas–Cannondale	+ 6"
4	Maciej Bodnar (POL)	Liquigas–Cannondale	+ 7"
5	Alexander Kristoff (NOR)	Team Katusha	+ 10"
6	Elia Favilli (ITA)	Farnese Vini–Selle Italia	+ 10"
7	Marcel Sieberg (GER)	Lotto–Belisol	+ 10"
8	Baptiste Planckaert (BEL)	Landbouwkrediet–Euphony	+ 10"
9	Tom Van Asbroeck (BEL)	Topsport Vlaanderen–Mercator	+ 10"
10	Yauheni Hutarovich (BLR)	FDJ–BigMat	+ 10"

=== Stage 2 ===
28 March 2012 – Zottegem to Koksijde, 216.1 km (134.3 mi)

Stage 2 Result
	Rider	Team	Time
1	Marcel Kittel (GER)	Project 1t4i	4h 51' 16"
2	Alexander Kristoff (NOR)	Team Katusha	s.t.
3	Boy van Poppel (NED)	UnitedHealthcare	s.t.
4	Kenny van Hummel (NED)	Vacansoleil–DCM	s.t.
5	André Greipel (GER)	Lotto–Belisol	s.t.
6	Jacopo Guarnieri (ITA)	Astana	s.t.
7	Sébastien Turgot (FRA)	Team Europcar	s.t.
8	André Schulze (GER)	Team NetApp	s.t.
9	Saïd Haddou (FRA)	Team Europcar	s.t.
10	Alexander Serebryakov (RUS)	Team Type 1–Sanofi	s.t.

General Classification after Stage 2
	Rider	Team	Time
1	Alexander Kristoff (NOR)	Team Katusha	9h 24' 51"
2	Jacopo Guarnieri (ITA)	Astana	s.t.
3	Maciej Bodnar (POL)	Liquigas–Cannondale	+ 1"
4	Fabio Sabatini (ITA)	Liquigas–Cannondale	+ 2"
5	Steve Chainel (FRA)	FDJ–BigMat	+ 4"
6	Sébastien Turgot (FRA)	Team Europcar	+ 6"
7	Elia Favilli (ITA)	Farnese Vini–Selle Italia	+ 6"
8	Baptiste Planckaert (BEL)	Landbouwkrediet–Euphony	+ 6"
9	Tom Van Asbroeck (BEL)	Topsport Vlaanderen–Mercator	+ 6"
10	Egidijus Juodvalkis (LTU)	Landbouwkrediet–Euphony	+ 6"

=== Stage 3a ===
29 March 2012 – De Panne to De Panne, 112.1 km (69.7 mi)

Stage 3a Result
	Rider	Team	Time
1	Alexander Kristoff (NOR)	Team Katusha	2h 22' 58"
2	André Schulze (GER)	Team NetApp	s.t.
3	Kenny van Hummel (NED)	Vacansoleil–DCM	s.t.
4	Francesco Chicchi (ITA)	Omega Pharma–Quick-Step	s.t.
5	Daniele Colli (ITA)	Team Type 1–Sanofi	s.t.
6	Davide Cimolai (ITA)	Lampre–ISD	s.t.
7	Jacopo Guarnieri (ITA)	Astana	s.t.
8	Michael Van Staeyen (BEL)	Topsport Vlaanderen–Mercator	s.t.
9	Yauheni Hutarovich (BLR)	FDJ–BigMat	s.t.
10	Saïd Haddou (FRA)	Team Europcar	s.t.

General Classification after Stage 3a
	Rider	Team	Time
1	Alexander Kristoff (NOR)	Team Katusha	11h 47' 43"
2	Jacopo Guarnieri (ITA)	Astana	+ 6"
3	Maciej Bodnar (POL)	Liquigas–Cannondale	+ 7"
4	Steve Chainel (FRA)	FDJ–BigMat	+ 10"
5	Elia Favilli (ITA)	Farnese Vini–Selle Italia	+ 12"
6	Yauheni Hutarovich (BLR)	FDJ–BigMat	+ 12"
7	Tom Van Asbroeck (BEL)	Topsport Vlaanderen–Mercator	+ 12"
8	Sébastien Turgot (FRA)	Team Europcar	+ 12"
9	Egidijus Juodvalkis (LTU)	Landbouwkrediet–Euphony	+ 12"
10	Valentin Iglinsky (KAZ)	Astana	+ 12"

=== Stage 3b ===
29 March 2012 – De Panne to Koksijde to De Panne, 14.7 km (9.1 mi) individual time trial (ITT)

Stage 3b Result
	Rider	Team	Time
1	Sylvain Chavanel (FRA)	Omega Pharma–Quick-Step	17' 49"
2	Lieuwe Westra (NED)	Vacansoleil–DCM	+ 4"
3	Svein Tuft (CAN)	GreenEDGE	+ 17"
4	Niki Terpstra (NED)	Omega Pharma–Quick-Step	+ 18"
5	Maciej Bodnar (POL)	Liquigas–Cannondale	+ 19"
6	Jesse Sergent (NZL)	RadioShack–Nissan	+ 22"
7	Tomas Vaitkus (LTU)	GreenEDGE	+ 31"
8	Luke Durbridge (AUS)	GreenEDGE	+ 32"
9	Guillaume Van Keirsbulck (BEL)	Omega Pharma–Quick-Step	+ 38"
10	Stijn Devolder (BEL)	Vacansoleil–DCM	+ 39"

Final General Classification
	Rider	Team	Time
1	Sylvain Chavanel (FRA)	Omega Pharma–Quick-Step	12h 05' 44"
2	Lieuwe Westra (NED)	Vacansoleil–DCM	+ 4"
3	Maciej Bodnar (POL)	Liquigas–Cannondale	+ 14"
4	Svein Tuft (CAN)	GreenEDGE	+ 17"
5	Niki Terpstra (NED)	Omega Pharma–Quick-Step	+ 18"
6	Jesse Sergent (NZL)	RadioShack–Nissan	+ 22"
7	Luke Durbridge (AUS)	GreenEDGE	+ 32"
8	Stijn Devolder (BEL)	Vacansoleil–DCM	+ 39"
9	Markel Irizar (ESP)	RadioShack–Nissan	+ 51"
10	Sébastien Turgot (FRA)	Team Europcar	+ 55"

== Classification leadership ==
Stage	Winner	General classification	Points classification	Mountains classification	Sprints classification	Team classification	Combativity award
1	Peter Sagan	Peter Sagan	Peter Sagan	Tosh Van Der Sande	Steven Van Vooren	Liquigas–Cannondale	Tosh Van Der Sande
2	Marcel Kittel	Alexander Kristoff	Alexander Kristoff	Tosh Van Der Sande	Andy Cappelle	Team Europcar	Andy Cappelle
3a	Alexander Kristoff	Alexander Kristoff	Alexander Kristoff	Tosh Van Der Sande	Andy Cappelle	Team Europcar	Preben Van Hecke
3b	Sylvain Chavanel	Sylvain Chavanel	Alexander Kristoff	Tosh Van Der Sande	Andy Cappelle	Omega Pharma–Quick-Step	no award
Final		Sylvain Chavanel	Alexander Kristoff	Tosh Van Der Sande	Andy Cappelle	Omega Pharma–Quick-Step	Andy Cappelle

== Final standings ==
General classification
	Rider	Team	Time
1	Sylvain Chavanel (FRA)	Omega Pharma–Quick-Step	12h 05' 44"
2	Lieuwe Westra (NED)	Vacansoleil–DCM	+ 4"
3	Maciej Bodnar (POL)	Liquigas–Cannondale	+ 14"
4	Svein Tuft (CAN)	GreenEDGE	+ 17"
5	Niki Terpstra (NED)	Omega Pharma–Quick-Step	+ 18"
6	Jesse Sergent (NZL)	RadioShack–Nissan	+ 22"
7	Luke Durbridge (AUS)	GreenEDGE	+ 32"
8	Stijn Devolder (BEL)	Vacansoleil–DCM	+ 39"
9	Markel Irizar (ESP)	RadioShack–Nissan	+ 51"
10	Sébastien Turgot (FRA)	Team Europcar	+ 55"

Points classification
	Rider	Team	Points
1	Alexander Kristoff (NOR)	Team Katusha	42
2	Jacopo Guarnieri (ITA)	Astana	32
3	Kenny van Hummel (NED)	Vacansoleil–DCM	22
4	Marcel Kittel (GER)	Project 1t4i	20
5	Fabio Sabatini (ITA)	Liquigas–Cannondale	16
6	Boy van Poppel (NED)	UnitedHealthcare	16
7	Sébastien Turgot (FRA)	Team Europcar	15
8	Elia Favilli (ITA)	Farnese Vini–Selle Italia	12
9	André Greipel (GER)	Lotto–Belisol	12
10	Sylvain Chavanel (FRA)	Omega Pharma–Quick-Step	10

Mountains classification
	Rider	Team	Points
1	Tosh Van Der Sande (BEL)	Lotto–Belisol	31
2	Brian Vandborg (DEN)	SpiderTech–C10	21
3	Andy Capelle (BEL)	Accent.jobs–Willems Veranda's	17
4	Ronan van Zandbeek (NED)	Project 1t4i	16
5	Sylvain Chavanel (FRA)	Omega Pharma–Quick-Step	5
6	Lieuwe Westra (NED)	Vacansoleil–DCM	5
7	Stijn Devolder (BEL)	Vacansoleil–DCM	3
8	Jacopo Guarnieri (ITA)	Astana	3

Rushes classification
	Rider	Team	Time
1	Andy Capelle (BEL)	Accent.jobs–Willems Veranda's	9
2	Maciej Bodnar (POL)	Liquigas–Cannondale	5
3	Andrea Di Corrado (ITA)	Colnago–CSF Bardiani	3
4	Tosh Van Der Sande (BEL)	Lotto–Belisol	3
5	Steve Chainel (FRA)	FDJ–BigMat	2
6	Ronan van Zandbeek (NED)	Project 1t4i	2
7	Kenny van Hummel (NED)	Vacansoleil–DCM	2
8	Alexei Tsatevich (RUS)	Team Katusha	1
9	Clinton Avery (NZL)	Champion System	1
10	Brian Vandborg (DEN)	SpiderTech–C10	1

Team classification
Pos.	Team	Time
1	Omega Pharma–Quick-Step	36h 18' 08"
2	GreenEDGE	+ 24"
3	RadioShack–Nissan	+ 1' 01"
4	Team Katusha	+ 2' 28"
5	Team Europcar	+ 2' 49"
6	Liquigas–Cannondale	+ 3' 00"
7	Topsport Vlaanderen–Mercator	+ 3' 25"
8	Landbouwkrediet–Euphony	+ 3' 40"
9	Farnese Vini–Selle Italia	+ 3' 57"
10	Astana	+ 5' 14"
