= 2006 Three Days of De Panne =

Race details
- Dates: 28 March–30 March 2006
- Stages: 4
- Distance: 551.5 km (342.7 mi)
- Winning time: 13h 17' 03"

Results
| | Winner | Leif Hoste (BEL) |
| | Second | Bernhard Eisel (AUT) |
| | Third | Luis León Sánchez (ESP) |

The 2006 Three Days of De Panne was the 30th edition of the Three Days of De Panne cycle race and was held on 28 March to 30 March 2006. The race started in Middelkerke and finished in De Panne. The race was won by Leif Hoste.

== General classification ==
Final general classification

| Rank | Rider | Time |
|---|---|---|
| 1 | Leif Hoste (BEL) | 13h 17' 03" |
| 2 | Bernhard Eisel (AUT) | + 30" |
| 3 | Luis León Sánchez (ESP) | + 1' 05" |
| 4 | Sébastien Rosseler (BEL) | + 1' 08" |
| 5 | George Hincapie (USA) | + 1' 25" |
| 6 | Steven de Jongh (NED) | + 1' 34" |
| 7 | José Joaquín Rojas (ESP) | + 1' 45" |
| 8 | Stijn Devolder (BEL) | + 1' 52" |
| 9 | Enrico Franzoi (ITA) | + 2' 15" |
| 10 | Claudio Corioni (ITA) | + 2' 35" |
