= 2006 Clásica de Almería =

Race details
- Dates: 26 February 2006
- Stages: 1
- Distance: 173.1 km (107.6 mi)
- Winning time: 4h 16' 41"

Results
	Winner	Francisco Pérez (ESP)
	Second	Ricardo Serrano (ESP)
	Third	Adolfo García Quesada (ESP)

The 2006 Clásica de Almería was the 21st edition of the Clásica de Almería cycle race and was held on 26 February 2006. The race was won by Francisco Pérez.

== General classification ==
Final general classification

Rank	Rider	Time
1	Francisco Pérez (ESP)	4h 16' 41"
2	Ricardo Serrano (ESP)	+ 7"
3	Adolfo García Quesada (ESP)	+ 7"
4	Allan Davis (AUS)	+ 19"
5	Francisco Ventoso (ESP)	+ 19"
6	Heinrich Haussler (AUS)	+ 20"
7	Alejandro Valverde (ESP)	+ 20"
8	Damiano Cunego (ITA)	+ 20"
9	Adrián Palomares (ESP)	+ 20"
10	Dionisio Galparsoro (ESP)	+ 20"
