= 2004 Three Days of De Panne =

Race details
- Dates: 30 March–1 April 2004
- Stages: 4
- Distance: 562.7 km (349.6 mi)
- Winning time: 13h 29' 06"

Results
| | Winner | George Hincapie (USA) |
| | Second | Danilo Hondo (GER) |
| | Third | Gerben Löwik (NED) |

The 2004 Three Days of De Panne was the 28th edition of the Three Days of De Panne cycle race and was held on 30 March to 1 April 2004. The race started in Middelkerke and finished in De Panne. The race was won by George Hincapie.

== General classification ==
Final general classification

| Rank | Rider | Time |
|---|---|---|
| 1 | George Hincapie (USA) | 13h 29' 06" |
| 2 | Danilo Hondo (GER) | + 10" |
| 3 | Gerben Löwik (NED) | + 11" |
| 4 | Fabian Cancellara (SUI) | s.t. |
| 5 | Marc Wauters (BEL) | + 13" |
| 6 | Stijn Devolder (BEL) | + 20" |
| 7 | Bert Grabsch (GER) | s.t. |
| 8 | Steffen Wesemann (SUI) | + 21" |
| 9 | Léon van Bon (NED) | + 22" |
| 10 | Juan Antonio Flecha (ESP) | + 23" |
