= 2011 Chrono des Nations =

Race details
- Dates: 16 October 2011
- Stages: 1
- Distance: 48.5 km (30.14 mi)
- Winning time: 56' 20"

Results
	Winner	Tony Martin (GER)
	Second	Gustav Larsson (SWE)
	Third	Alex Dowsett (GBR)

The 2011 Chrono des Nations was the 30th edition of the Chrono des Nations cycle race and was held on 16 October 2011. The race started and finished in Les Herbiers. The race was won by Tony Martin.

== General classification ==
Final general classification

Rank	Rider	Time
1	Tony Martin (GER)	56' 20"
2	Gustav Larsson (SWE)	+ 2' 03"
3	Alex Dowsett (GBR)	+ 2' 50"
4	Stef Clement (NED)	+ 3' 20"
5	David Millar (GBR)	+ 3' 51"
6	László Bodrogi (HUN)	+ 3' 58"
7	Stijn Devolder (BEL)	+ 4' 05"
8	Lieuwe Westra (NED)	+ 4' 10"
9	Thomas De Gendt (BEL)	+ 4' 53"
10	Markel Irizar (ESP)	+ 5' 00"
