= Claudio Corioni =

Italian cyclist

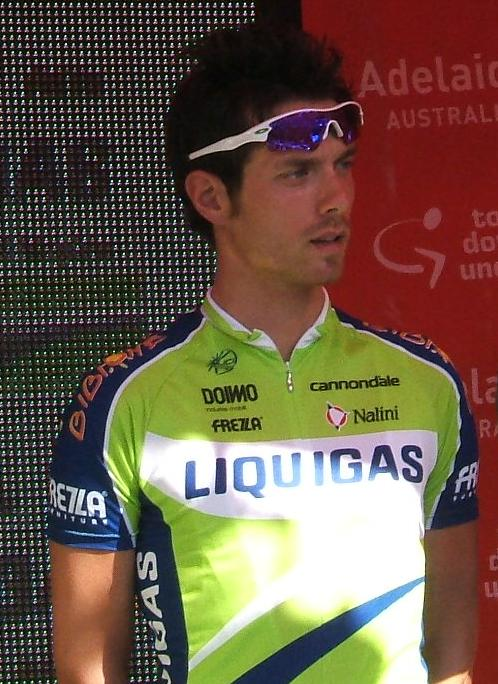

Personal information
- Full name: Claudio Corioni
- Born: 26 December 1982 (age 43) Chiari, Italy
- Height: 1.80 m (5 ft 11 in)
- Weight: 67 kg (148 lb)

Cycling career
- Sport: Cycling
- Discipline: Road
- Role: Rider

Professional teams
- 2005: Fassa Bortolo
- 2006–2007: Lampre–Fondital
- 2008–2009: Liquigas
- 2010: De Rosa–Stac Plastic
- 2011–2012: Acqua & Sapone

Major wins
- Grand Tours Vuelta a España 1 TTT stage (2008)

Claudio Corioni (born 26 December 1982) is an Italian former professional road bicycle racer from 2005 to 2012. He notably was in the team which won the opening Team time trial of the 2008 Vuelta a España.

== Career ==
In 2009 Corioni fractured his shoulder. In 2011 during stage 2 of the Settimana Internazionale di Coppi e Bartali, Corioni attacked with less than a kilometre to go. He held off the peloton to win the stage.

== Major results ==
2002
2nd Trofeo PIVA
3rd Trofeo Città di San Vendemiano
5th Circuito Caneva
8th Coppa della Pace
8th Giro del Canavese
9th Trofeo Citta di Brescia
10th Trofeo Alcide Degasperi
10th Giro del Belvedere
2003
1st Milano - Busseto
1st Memorial Danilo Furlan
3rd Trofeo Citta di Brescia
2004
1st Giro del Belvedere
1st Piccola Coppa Agostoni
1st Trofeo Citta di Bresci
2nd Ronde van Vlaanderen Beloften
2nd Milano - Busseto
3rd Grand Prix Joseph Bruyere
5th Gran Premio Palio del Recioto
6th Trofeo Sportivi di Briga
6th GP Citta di Felino
6th GP Capodarco
2005
Setmana Catalana de Ciclisme

1st Points classification
1st Stage 2

2006
2nd Giro della Provincia di Lucca
10th Overall Three Days of De Panne
2008
1st Stage 1 Vuelta a España
5th Worlds View Challenge 1
5th Worlds View Challenge 4
9th Overall Giro della Provincia di Grosseto
2011
1st Stage 2 Settimana Internazionale di Coppi e Bartali
8th Giro della Romagna
2012
10th Coppa Bernocchi
