= 2004 Tour du Haut Var =

Race details
- Dates: 21 February 2004
- Stages: 1
- Distance: 180 km (111.8 mi)
- Winning time: 4h 49' 13"

Results
	Winner	Marc Lotz (NED)
	Second	Dmitry Fofonov (KAZ)
	Third	Stijn Devolder (BEL)

The 2004 Tour du Haut Var was the 36th edition of the Tour du Haut Var cycle race and was held on 21 February 2004. The race started and finished in Draguignan. The race was won by Marc Lotz.

== General classification ==
Final general classification

Rank	Rider	Time
1	Marc Lotz (NED)	4h 49' 13"
2	Dmitry Fofonov (KAZ)	+ 0"
3	Stijn Devolder (BEL)	+ 0"
4	Frédéric Bessy (FRA)	+ 0"
5	Levi Leipheimer (USA)	+ 10"
6	Davide Rebellin (ITA)	+ 1' 10"
7	Mirko Celestino (ITA)	+ 1' 10"
8	Bram Tankink (NED)	+ 1' 10"
9	Massimo Iannetti (ITA)	+ 1' 10"
10	Pietro Caucchioli (ITA)	+ 1' 12"
