= 2005 Deutschland Tour =

2005 UCI ProTour

Race details
- Dates: 15–23 August 2005
- Stages: 9
- Distance: 1,515 km (941.4 mi)
- Winning time: 37h 34' 35"

Results
Jersey awarded to the overall winner	Winner	Levi Leipheimer (USA)	(Gerolsteiner)
	Second	~~Jan Ullrich~~ (GER)	(~~T-Mobile Team~~)
	Third	Georg Totschnig (AUT)	(Gerolsteiner)
Jersey awarded to the points classification winner	Points	Daniele Bennati (ITA)	(Lampre–Caffita)
Jersey awarded to the mountains classification winner	Mountains	Jörg Jaksche (GER)	(Liberty Seguros–Würth)
Jersey awarded to the team classification winner	Team	Liberty Seguros–Würth	

The 2005 Deutschland Tour was a men's road cycling stage race which took place from 26 to 29 August 2021. It was the 30th edition of the Deutschland Tour and part of the 2005 UCI ProTour.

== Teams ==
UCI Pro Tour Teams

- Bouygues Télécom
- Cofidis
- Crédit Agricole
- Davitamon–Lotto
- Discovery Channel
- Domina Vacanze
- Euskaltel–Euskadi
- Fassa Bortolo
- Française des Jeux
- Gerolsteiner
- Illes Balears–Caisse d'Epargne
- Lampre–Caffita
- Liberty Seguros–Würth
- Liquigas–Bianchi
- Phonak
- Quick-Step–Innergetic
- Rabobank
- Saunier Duval–Prodir
- T-Mobile Team
- Team CSC

== Schedule ==
Stage characteristics and winners
Stage	Date	Route	Distance	Stage winner
1	15 August	Altenburg to Plauen	170 km (110 mi)	Bram Tankink (NED)
2	16 August	Pegnitz to Bodenmais	180 km (110 mi)	Filippo Pozzato (ITA)
3	17 August	Bodenmais to Kufstein	227 km (141 mi)	Daniele Bennati (ITA)
4	18 August	Kufstein to Sölden	175 km (109 mi)	Levi Leipheimer (USA)
5	19 August	Sölden to Friedrichshafen	215 km (134 mi)	Daniele Bennati (ITA)
6	20 August	Friedrichshafen to Singen	175 km (109 mi)	Maxim Iglinskiy (KAZ)
7	21 August	Singen to Feldberg	173 km (107 mi)	Cadel Evans (AUS)
8	22 August	Ludwigshafen to Weinheim	30 km (19 mi)	~~Jan Ullrich (GER)~~
9	23 August	Bad Kreuznach to Bonn	170 km (110 mi)	Daniele Bennati (ITA)
Total			720 km (450 mi)	

== Stages ==
=== Stage 1 ===
15 August 2005 – Altenburg to Plauen, 170 km (110 mi)

Stage 1 Result
Rank	Rider	Team	Time
1	Bram Tankink (NED)	Quick-Step–Innergetic	4h 00' 25"
2	Juan José Cobo (ESP)	Saunier Duval–Prodir	+ 48"
3	Bernhard Eisel (AUT)	Française des Jeux	+ 51"

=== Stage 2 ===
16 August 2005 – Pegnitz to Bodenmais, 180 km (110 mi)

Stage 2 Result
Rank	Rider	Team	Time
1	Filippo Pozzato (ITA)	Quick-Step–Innergetic	4h 49' 40"
2	Jörg Jaksche (GER)	Liberty Seguros–Würth	+ 0"
3	Mauricio Ardila (COL)	Davitamon–Lotto	+ 0"

=== Stage 3 ===
17 August 2005 – Bodenmais to Kufstein 227 km (141 mi)

Stage 3 Result
Rank	Rider	Team	Time
1	Daniele Bennati (ITA)	Lampre–Caffita	5h 12' 04"
2	Filippo Pozzato (ITA)	Quick-Step–Innergetic	+ 0"
3	Sebastian Siedler (GER)	Team Wiesenhof	+ 0"

=== Stage 4 ===
18 August 2005 – Kufstein – Sölden 175 km (109 mi)

Stage 4 Result
Rank	Rider	Team	Time
1	Levi Leipheimer (USA)	Gerolsteiner	5h 11' 56
2	Georg Totschnig (AUT)	Gerolsteiner	+ 15"
~~3~~	~~Jan Ullrich~~ (GER)	~~T-Mobile Team~~	~~+ 50"~~

=== Stage 5 ===
19 August 2005 – Sölden – Friedrichshafen 215 km (134 mi)

Stage 5 Result
Rank	Rider	Team	Time
1	Daniele Bennati (ITA)	Lampre–Caffita	4h 48' 02
2	Roger Hammond (GBR)	Discovery Channel	+ 0"
3	Baden Cooke (AUS)	Française des Jeux	+ 0"

=== 20-08-2005: Friedrichshafen-Singen, 175 km. ===
	Cyclist	Team	Time
1	Maxim Iglinskiy	Domina Vacanze	3h 50' 00"
2	Jurgen van den Broeck	Discovery Channel	s.t.
3	Alessandro Ballan	Lampre–Caffita	s.t.

=== 21-08-2005: Singen-Feldberg, 173 km. ===
	Cyclist	Team	Time
1	Cadel Evans	Davitamon–Lotto	4h 56' 10"
2	Fabian Jeker	Saunier Duval–Prodir	+ 11"
3	Jörg Jaksche	Liberty Seguros	+ 11"

=== 22-08-2005: Ludwigshafen-Weinheim, 30 km. (ITT) ===
	Cyclist	Team	Time
1	Jan Ullrich	T-Mobile Team	36' 56"
2	Bobby Julich	Team CSC	+ 11"
3	Levi Leipheimer	Gerolsteiner	+ 54"

=== 23-08-2005: Bad Kreuznach-Bonn, 170 km. ===
	Cyclist	Team	Time
1	Daniele Bennati	Lampre–Caffita	3h 53' 03"
2	Baden Cooke	La Française des Jeux	s.t.
3	Fabian Cancellara	Fassa Bortolo	s.t.

== Final classification standings ==
Legend
Denotes the winner of the general classification	Denotes the winner of the team classification
Denotes the winner of the points classification	Denotes the winner of the mountains classification

=== General classification ===
Final general classification (1–10)
Rank	Rider	Team	Time
1	Levi Leipheimer (USA)	Gerolsteiner	37h 24' 35
~~2~~	~~Jan Ullrich~~ (GER)	~~T-Mobile Team~~	~~+ 31"~~
3	Georg Totschnig (AUT)	Gerolsteiner	+1'23"
4	Jörg Jaksche (GER)	Liberty Seguros–Würth	+1'29"
5	Cadel Evans (AUS)	Davitamon–Lotto	+1'53"
6	Tadej Valjavec (SLO)	Phonak	+3'53"
7	Fabian Jeker (SUI)	Saunier Duval–Prodir	+4'26"
8	Marzio Bruseghin (ITA)	Fassa Bortolo	+5'07"
9	Saul Raisin (USA)	Crédit Agricole	+6'03"
10	Patrik Sinkewitz (GER)	Quick-Step–Innergetic	+6'30"

=== Mountains classification ===
Mountains classification (1–10)
Rank	Rider	Team	Points
1	Levi Leipheimer (USA)	Gerolsteiner	25
2	Cadel Evans (AUS)	Davitamon–Lotto	22
3	Markus Fothen (GER)	Gerolsteiner	21
4	Jörg Jaksche (GER)	Liberty Seguros–Würth	16
5	Fabian Wegmann (GER)	Gerolsteiner	15
6	Sergio Paulinho (POR)	Liberty Seguros–Würth	13
7	Volodymyr Gustov (UKR)	Fassa Bortolo	12
8	Georg Totschnig (AUT)	Gerolsteiner	12
9	Saul Raisin (USA)	Crédit Agricole	12
10	Dario David Cioni (ITA)	Liquigas–Bianchi	10

=== Points classification ===
Final points classification (1–10)
Rank	Rider	Team	Points
1	Daniele Bennati (ITA)	Lampre–Caffita	101
2	Jörg Jaksche (GER)	Liberty Seguros–Würth	60
3	Levi Leipheimer (USA)	Gerolsteiner	54
4	Cadel Evans (AUS)	Davitamon–Lotto	53
5	Sebastian Siedler (GER)	Team Wiesenhof	48
6	Baden Cooke (AUS)	Française des Jeux	47
~~7~~	~~Jan Ullrich~~ (GER)	~~T-Mobile Team~~	~~46~~
8	Bobby Julich (USA)	Team CSC	45
9	Georg Totschnig (AUT)	Gerolsteiner	37
10	Fabian Cancellara (SUI)	Fassa Bortolo	36

=== Team classification ===
Final team classification (1–10)
Rank	Team	Time
1	Liberty Seguros–Würth	112h 33' 56"
2	Gerolsteiner	+3'40"
3	Davitamon–Lotto	+7'49"
4	Phonak	+8'30"
5	Saunier Duval–Prodir	+13'16"
6	Team CSC	+19'48"
7	Illes Balears–Caisse d'Epargne	+24'07"
8	Rabobank	+26'36"
9	T-Mobile Team	+38'42"
10	Cofidis	+44'12"
