= 2005 Three Days of De Panne =

Race details
- Dates: 29 March–31 March 2005
- Stages: 4
- Distance: 562.7 km (349.6 mi)
- Winning time: 13h 15' 16"

Results
	Winner	Stijn Devolder (BEL)
	Second	Alessandro Ballan (ITA)
	Third	Nico Mattan (BEL)

The 2005 Three Days of De Panne was the 29th edition of the Three Days of De Panne cycle race and was held on 29 March to 31 March 2005. The race started in Middelkerke and finished in De Panne. The race was won by Stijn Devolder.

== General classification ==
Final general classification

Rank	Rider	Time
1	Stijn Devolder (BEL)	13h 15' 16"
2	Alessandro Ballan (ITA)	+ 16"
3	Nico Mattan (BEL)	+ 24"
4	Luis León Sánchez (ESP)	+ 44"
5	Roberto Petito (ITA)	+ 45"
6	Servais Knaven (NED)	+ 1' 01"
7	Michael Albasini (SUI)	+ 1' 25"
8	Mathew Hayman (AUS)	+ 1' 31"
9	Roy Sentjens (BEL)	+ 1' 34"
10	Mirko Celestino (ITA)	+ 2' 04"
