= 2007 Three Days of De Panne =

Race details
- Dates: 3 April–5 April 2007
- Stages: 4
- Distance: 549 km (341 mi)
- Winning time: 12h 48' 07"

Results
	Winner	Alessandro Ballan (ITA)
	Second	Joost Posthuma (NED)
	Third	Bert Roesems (BEL)

The 2007 Three Days of De Panne was the 31st edition of the Three Days of De Panne cycle race and was held on 3 April to 5 April 2007. The race started in Middelkerke and finished in De Panne. The race was won by Alessandro Ballan.

== General classification ==
Final general classification

Rank	Rider	Time
1	Alessandro Ballan (ITA)	12h 48' 07"
2	Joost Posthuma (NED)	+ 6"
3	Bert Roesems (BEL)	+ 11"
4	Sergiy Matveyev (UKR)	+ 17"
5	Vladimir Gusev (RUS)	+ 38"
6	Sébastien Rosseler (BEL)	+ 45"
7	Kevin Hulsmans (BEL)	+ 49"
8	Markus Eichler (GER)	+ 54"
9	Daniele Bennati (ITA)	+ 55"
10	Luca Paolini (ITA)	+ 1' 06"
