= 2011 E3 Prijs Vlaanderen =

2011 E3 Prijs Vlaanderen – Harelbeke

Race details
- Dates: 26 March 2011
- Stages: 1
- Distance: 222 km (138 mi)
- Winning time: 4h 34' 49"

Results
	Winner	Fabian Cancellara (SWI)	(Leopard Trek)
	Second	Jürgen Roelandts (BEL)	(Omega Pharma–Lotto)
	Third	Vladimir Gusev (RUS)	(Team Katusha)

The 2011 E3 Prijs Vlaanderen – Harelbeke took place on 26 March 2011. It was the 54th edition of the international classic E3 Prijs Vlaanderen – Harelbeke and is rated as a 1.HC event on the UCI Europe Tour. This edition was won by Leopard Trek's rider Fabian Cancellara.

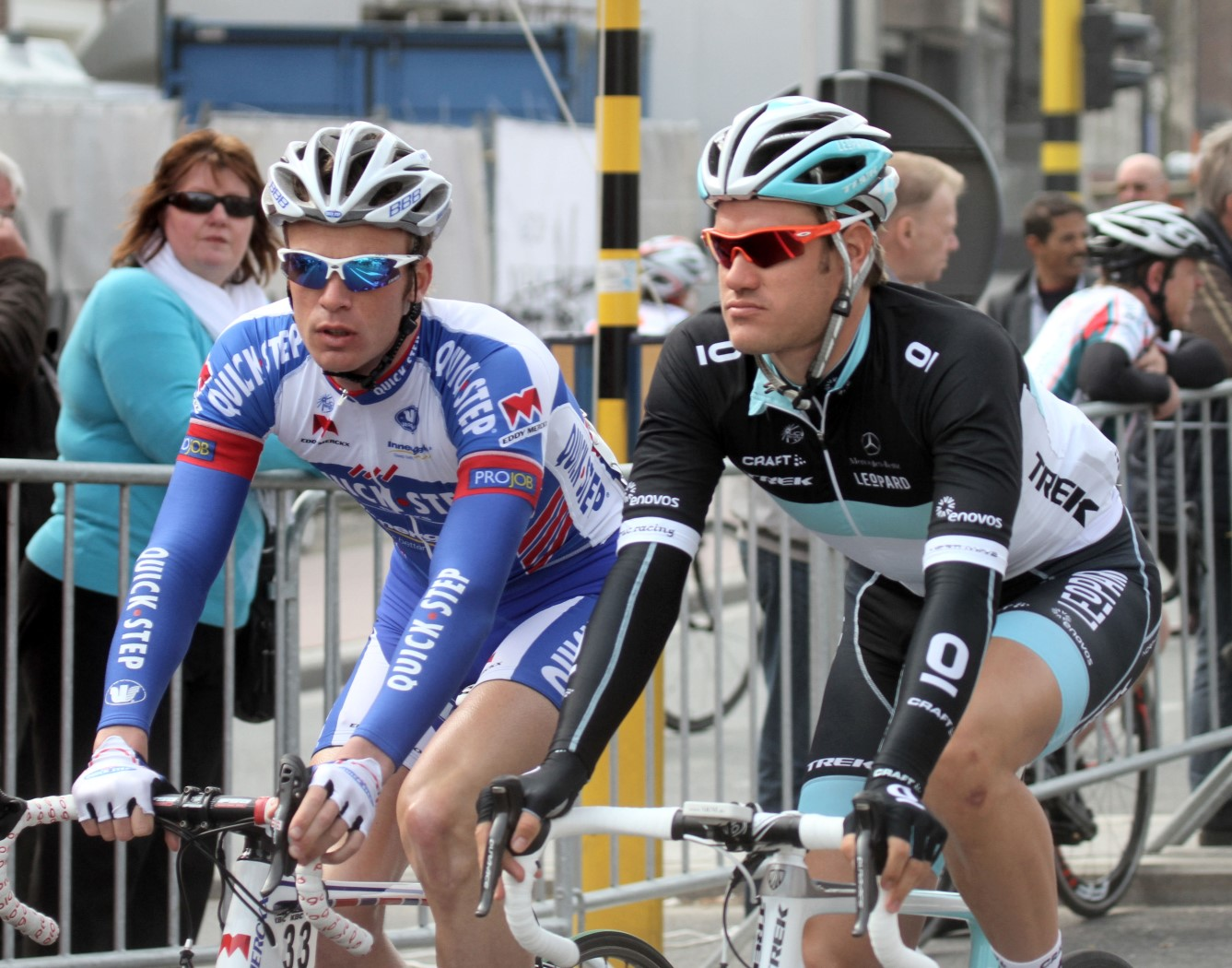
Iljo Keisse and Wouter Weylandt during the race

== Results ==
	Cyclist	Team	Time
1	Fabian Cancellara (SWI)	Leopard Trek	4h 34' 49"
2	Jürgen Roelandts (BEL)	Omega Pharma–Lotto	+ 1' 00"
3	Vladimir Gusev (RUS)	Team Katusha	s.t.
4	Sep Vanmarcke (BEL)	Garmin–Cervélo	s.t.
5	Bram Tankink (NED)	Rabobank	s.t.
6	William Bonnet (FRA)	FDJ	+ 1' 01"
7	Heinrich Haussler (AUS)	Garmin–Cervélo	+ 1' 06"
8	Sébastien Hinault (FRA)	Ag2r–La Mondiale	s.t.
9	Stuart O'Grady (AUS)	Leopard Trek	s.t.
10	Sergei Ivanov (RUS)	Team Katusha	s.t.
