= Tour of Bruges =

Belgian road cycling race

Tour of Bruges (Ronde Van Brugge)

Race details
- Date: Late March
- Region: West Flanders, Belgium
- English name: Classic Bruges – De Panne
- Local name: Classic Brugge–De Panne (in Dutch)
- Discipline: Road race
- Competition: UCI World Tour (men); UCI Women's World Tour (women)
- Type: Three day stage-race (until 2017); Single-day race (for men & women, since 2018)
- Organiser: KVC Panne Sportief
- Race director: Jan Nys
- Web site: rondevanbrugge.be/en/

Men's race history
- First edition: 1977
- Editions: 50 (as of 2026)
- First winner: Roger Rosiers (BEL)
- Most wins: Eric Vanderaerden (BEL) (5 wins)
- Most recent: Dylan Groenewegen (NED)

Women's race history
- First edition: 2018
- Editions: 9 (as of 2026)
- First winner: Jolien D'Hoore (BEL)
- Most wins: Elisa Balsamo (ITA); Lorena Wiebes (NED) (2 wins)
- Most recent: Carys Lloyd (GBR)

Tour of Bruges (previous Classic Brugge–De Panne, Three Days of Bruges–De Panne and Three Days of De Panne) is a road cycling race in Belgium in late March. Since 2018 it is raced over two days with a men's race on Wednesday and a women's race on Thursday. Historically, races started in Bruges and finished in the seaside resort of De Panne. Since 2026 this race has a new name, as the race starts and finishes in Bruges. The race is considered a "sprinters classic", with many editions finishing in a sprint finish.

The women's event is included in the UCI Women's World Tour; the men's race was part of the UCI Europe Tour as a 1.HC event, but was promoted to the UCI World Tour as a 1.WT event in 2019.

== History ==
=== Three Days of De Panne ===
The Three Days of De Panne was created in 1977 as a three-day cycling event in the week leading up to the Tour of Flanders, in late March or early April. The first day was usually a hilly stage starting in De Panne and finishing in the Flemish Ardennes. The second day held a long flat stage back to the Flemish coast, with a finish in Koksijde. The third day consisted of two stages that both started and finished in De Panne, of which the final stage was an individual time trial. Raced from Tuesday to Thursday, it was the last Flemish race ahead of the Tour of Flanders and was considered a desirable preparation for the main event on Sunday. Eric Vanderaerden, a strong sprinter and time triallist, won the race five times in the late 1980s and early 1990s.

The race director had been Bernard Van de Kerckhove; after his death in 2015, the "Bernard Van de Kerckhove trophy" was created, given to the best young rider (U23) in the race.

=== Three Days of Bruges–De Panne ===
Classic Brugge–De Panne logo

Since 2018, the Three Days of De Panne is raced under a new format following a calendar switch with Dwars door Vlaanderen. (Note: Flanders Classics, organizer of Dwars door Vlaanderen, lobbied with UCI and was granted the date formerly held by the Three Days of De Panne. The organizers of the Three Days were granted the slot held by Dwars door Vlaanderen, but chose to shorten their race, as the next Flemish classic, E3 Harelbeke, is raced on a Friday.) The race comes one week earlier, in the week following Milan–San Remo, and the men's event has morphed into a one-day race on Wednesday. The Flemish Ardennes roads and the concluding time trial were abandoned in favour of a route entirely in the province of West Flanders. The iconic Kemmelberg and several cobbled sectors have a more prominent part in the new course.

In order to continue the multi-day format, a women's event was inaugurated on the day after the men's race. (Note: Initially the Three Days organizers had another three-day concept in mind, with a two-day contest for men and one day for women. The event would kick off with a sprinters challenge on Tuesday, but this idea was abandoned due to a lack of teams' interest. However, organizers intend to return to a three-day format in the future.) Both races started in Bruges and had two finishing circuits in and around De Panne. The women's race is part of the UCI Women's World Tour, cycling's top tier professional competition. Jolien D'Hoore won the first running of the women's Three Days in a sprint. Six of the eight editions of the women's race have finished in a sprint finish, with the race considered a "sprinters classic".

The finish in De Panne was criticised due to the amount of street furniture and tight corners prior to the finish.

=== Tour of Bruges ===
From 2026, the race will start and finish in Bruges, with a new name of Tour of Bruges. Organisers stated that it was no longer possible for the race to safely finish in De Panne, due to the "tram tracks, train tracks, traffic islands, bus stops, and road narrowings".

== Winners ==
=== Men's race ===
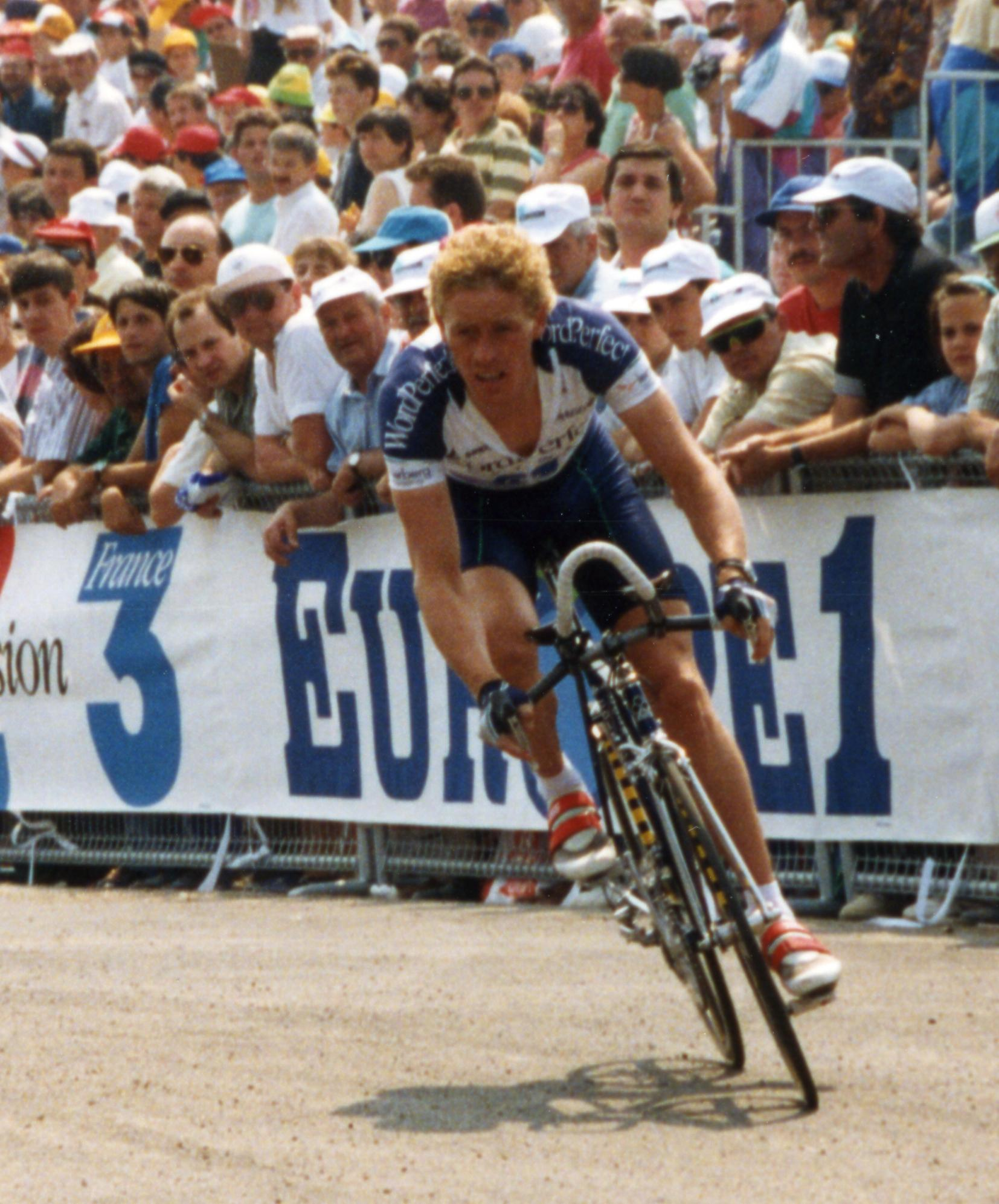
Eric Vanderaerden (pictured at the 1993 Tour de France) won the Three Days of De Panne five times, relying on strong sprint and time trialling abilities.

Year	Country	Rider	Team
↓ "Three Days of De Panne" ↓
1977	Belgium	Roger Rosiers	Frisol–Thirion–Gazelle
1978	Belgium	Guido Van Sweevelt	IJsboerke–Gios
1979	Belgium	Gustave Van Roosbroeck	IJsboerke–Warncke
1980	Ireland	Sean Kelly	Splendor–Admiral
1981	Belgium	Jan Bogaert	Vermeer Thijs
1982	Netherlands	Gerrie Knetemann	TI–Raleigh
1983	Netherlands	Cees Priem	TI–Raleigh
1984	Netherlands	Bert Oosterbosch	Panasonic
1985	Belgium	Jean-Luc Vandenbroucke	La Redoute
1986	Belgium	Eric Vanderaerden	Panasonic
1987	Belgium	Eric Vanderaerden	Panasonic–Isostar
1988	Belgium	Eric Vanderaerden	Panasonic–Isostar
1989	Belgium	Eric Vanderaerden	Panasonic–Isostar
1990	Netherlands	Erwin Nijboer	Stuttgart
1991	Netherlands	Jelle Nijdam	Buckler–Colnago–Decca
1992	Netherlands	Frans Maassen	Buckler–Colnago–Decca
1993	Belgium	Eric Vanderaerden	WordPerfect–Colnago–Decca
1994	Italy	Fabio Roscioli	Brescialat–Ceramiche Refin
1995	Italy	Michele Bartoli	Mercatone Uno–Saeco
1996	Russia	Viatcheslav Ekimov	Rabobank
1997	Belgium	Johan Museeuw	Mapei–GB
1998	Italy	Michele Bartoli	Asics–CGA
1999	Belgium	Peter Van Petegem	TVM–Farm Frites
2000	Russia	Viatcheslav Ekimov	U.S. Postal Service
2001	Belgium	Nico Mattan	Cofidis
2002	Belgium	Peter Van Petegem	Lotto–Adecco
2003	Latvia	Raivis Belohvoščiks	Marlux–Wincor Nixdorf
2004	United States	George Hincapie	U.S. Postal Service
2005	Belgium	Stijn Devolder	Discovery Channel
2006	Belgium	Leif Hoste	Discovery Channel
2007	Italy	Alessandro Ballan	Lampre–Fondital
2008	Netherlands	Joost Posthuma	Rabobank
2009	Belgium	Frederik Willems	Liquigas
2010	Great Britain	David Millar	Garmin–Transitions
2011	Belgium	Sébastien Rosseler	Team RadioShack
2012	France	Sylvain Chavanel	Omega Pharma–Quick-Step
2013	France	Sylvain Chavanel	Omega Pharma–Quick-Step
2014	Belgium	Guillaume Van Keirsbulck	Omega Pharma–Quick-Step
2015	Norway	Alexander Kristoff	Team Katusha
2016	Netherlands	Lieuwe Westra	Astana
2017	Belgium	Philippe Gilbert	Quick-Step Floors
↓ "Three Days of Bruges–De Panne" ↓
2018	Italy	Elia Viviani	Quick-Step Floors
2019	Netherlands	Dylan Groenewegen	Team Jumbo–Visma
2020	Belgium	Yves Lampaert	Deceuninck–Quick-Step
↓ "Classic Brugge–De Panne" ↓
2021	Ireland	Sam Bennett	Deceuninck–Quick-Step
2022	Belgium	Tim Merlier	Alpecin–Fenix
2023	Belgium	Jasper Philipsen	Alpecin–Deceuninck
2024	Belgium	Jasper Philipsen	Alpecin–Deceuninck
2025	Colombia	Juan Sebastián Molano	UAE Team Emirates XRG
↓ "Tour of Bruges" ↓
2026	Netherlands	Dylan Groenewegen	Unibet Rose Rockets

==== Multiple winners ====
Wins	Rider	Editions
5	Eric Vanderaerden (BEL)	1986, 1987, 1988, 1989, 1993
2	Michele Bartoli (ITA)	1995, 1998
2	Viatcheslav Ekimov (RUS)	1996, 2000
2	Jasper Philipsen (BEL)	2023, 2024
2	Peter Van Petegem (BEL)	1999, 2002
2	Sylvain Chavanel (FRA)	2012, 2013
2	Dylan Groenewegen (NED)	2019, 2026

==== Wins per country ====
Wins	Country
24	Belgium
10	Netherlands
5	Italy
2	France; Ireland; Russia
1	Colombia; Great Britain; Latvia; Norway; United States

=== Women's race ===
Year	Country	Rider	Team
↓ "Three Days of Bruges–De Panne Women" ↓
2018	Belgium	Jolien D'Hoore	Mitchelton–Scott
2019	Netherlands	Kirsten Wild	WNT–Rotor Pro Cycling
2020	Netherlands	Lorena Wiebes	Team Sunweb
↓ "Classic Brugge–De Panne Women" ↓
2021	Australia	Grace Brown	Team BikeExchange
2022	Italy	Elisa Balsamo	Trek–Segafredo
2023	Great Britain	Pfeiffer Georgi	Team DSM
2024	Italy	Elisa Balsamo	Lidl–Trek
2025	Netherlands	Lorena Wiebes	Team SD Worx–Protime
↓ "Tour of Bruges Women" ↓
2026	Great Britain	Carys Lloyd	Movistar Team

==== Multiple winners ====
Wins	Rider	Editions
2	Elisa Balsamo (ITA)	2022, 2024
2	Lorena Wiebes (NED)	2020, 2025

==== Wins per country ====
Wins	Country
3	Netherlands
2	Great Britain; Italy
1	Australia; Belgium
