= Marc Lotz =

Dutch cyclist

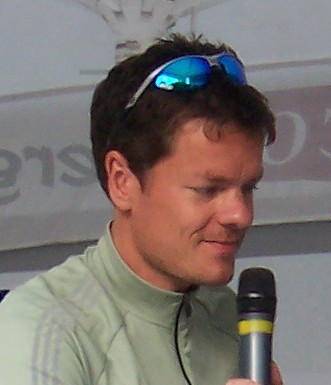

Personal information
- Born: October 19, 1973 (age 52) Valkenburg, Netherlands

Cycling career
- Sport: Cycling
- Current team: Retired
- Discipline: Road
- Role: Rider

Amateur teams
- 1995: TVM–Polis Direct (stagiaire)
- 1997: Rabobank (stagiaire)

Professional teams
- 1998–2004: Rabobank
- 2005: Quick-Step–Innergetic
- 2007: Team Löwik Meubelen

Marc Lotz (born 19 October 1973 in Valkenburg) is a Dutch former racing cyclist. In July 2005 Lotz was suspended from Quick-Step–Innergetic for two years due to admitting to using erythropoietin (EPO), a performance-enhancing drug. Lotz reportedly took the substance to help him at the 2005 Tour de France, which he never ended up riding.

== Major results ==
1994
2nd Ronde van Limburg (Netherlands)
1996
1st Overall Flèche du Sud
2nd Ronde van Limburg (Netherlands)
1997
1st Brussels Opwijk
1st Stage 5 Ster ZLM Toer
2nd Kattekoers
8th Overall Circuito Montañés

1st Stage 9

2001
6th Brabantse Pijl
2002
3rd Clásica de Almería
10th Rund um den Henninger Turm
2003
5th Clásica de Almería
2004
1st Tour du Haut Var
6th Brabantse Pijl
2005
2nd Brabantse Pijl
8th Trofeo Calvià

=== Grand Tour general classification results timeline ===
| Grand Tour | 1998 | 1999 | 2000 | 2001 | 2002 | 2003 | 2004 |
|---|---|---|---|---|---|---|---|
| Giro d'Italia | — | — | — | — | 70 | — | — |
| Tour de France | — | 72 | 56 | 93 | — | DNF | 90 |
| Vuelta a España | 103 | — | — | 100 | — | — | — |

Legend
| DSQ | Disqualified |
| DNF | Did not finish |
