= 2008 Tour of Flanders =

Tour of Flanders
2008 UCI ProTour, race 2 of 15
- Poster for the events in starting place Bruges

Race details
- Dates: April 6, 2008
- Stages: 1
- Distance: 264 km (164.0 mi)
- Winning time: 6h 24' 02"

Results
	Winner	Stijn Devolder (BEL)	(Quick-Step)
	Second	Nick Nuyens (BEL)	(Cofidis)
	Third	Juan Antonio Flecha (ESP)	(Rabobank)

The 2008 Tour of Flanders cycle race was the 92nd edition of this monumental classic and took place on April 6. The course was 264 km long and went from Bruges to Meerbeke.

Pre-race favorites included Fabian Cancellara (winner of Milan–San Remo and Tirreno–Adriatico), Alessandro Ballan (defending champion), Tom Boonen (winner in 2005 and 2006) and Leif Hoste (second-place position in 2004, 2006 and 2007).

== General standings ==
Bruges > Meerbeke, 264 km (164 mi)

200 riders had started the race, just 101 riders managed to finish.

	Cyclist	Team	Time	UCI ProTour Points
1	Stijn Devolder (BEL)	Quick-Step	6h 24' 02"	50
2	Nick Nuyens (BEL)	Cofidis	+ 15"	40
3	Juan Antonio Flecha (ESP)	Rabobank	+ 15"	35
4	Alessandro Ballan (ITA)	Lampre	+ 21"	30
5	George Hincapie (USA)	Team High Road	+ 21"	25
6	Filippo Pozzato (ITA)	Liquigas	+ 21"	20
7	Kurt Asle Arvesen (NOR)	Team CSC	+ 21"	15
8	Greg Van Avermaet (BEL)	Silence–Lotto	+ 21"	10
9	Simon Špilak (SLO)	Lampre	+ 21"	5
10	Allan Johansen (DEN)	Team CSC	+ 21"	2

== Course ==
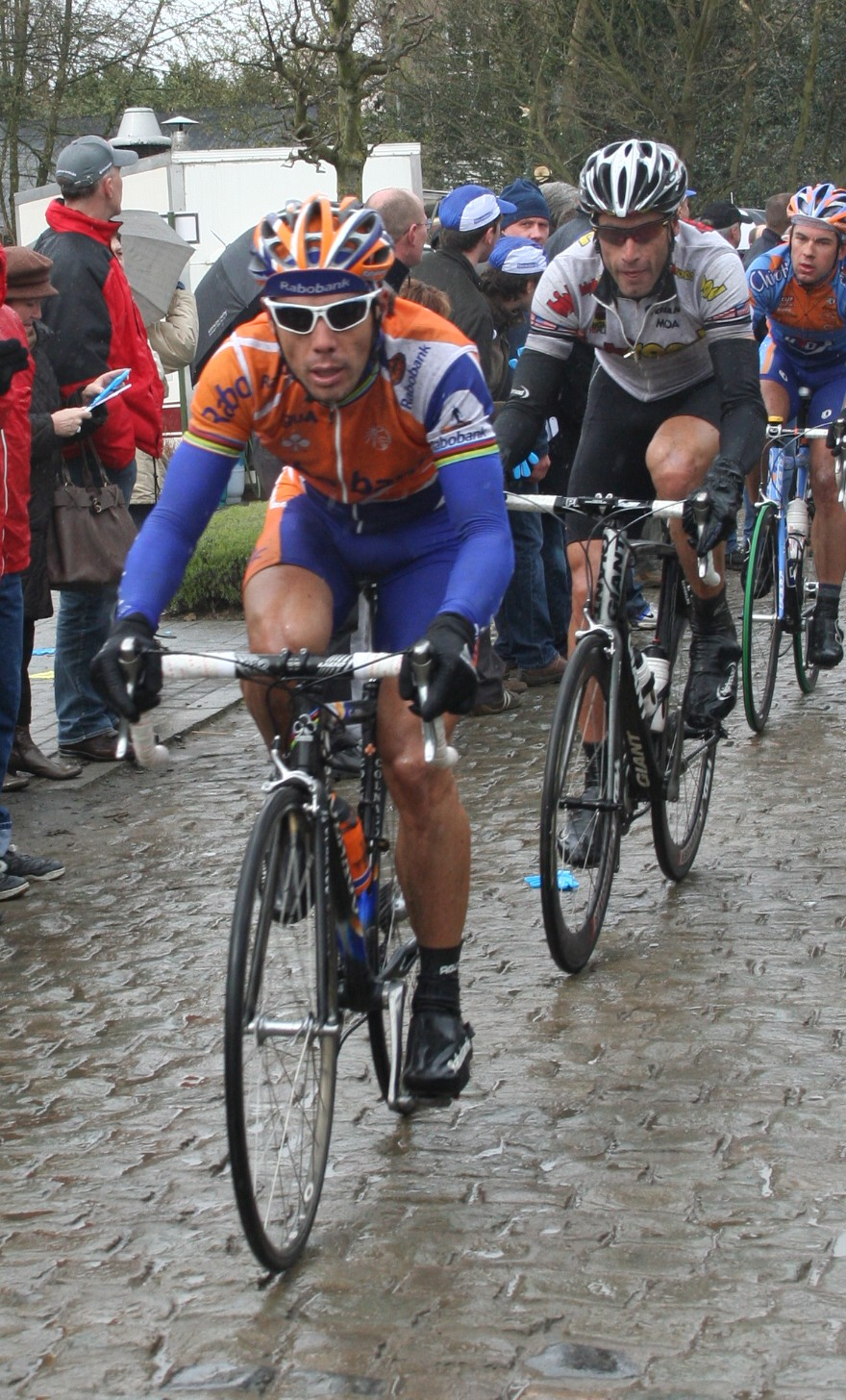
Óscar Freire with George Hincapie at the Kwaremont.

The 17 Tour of Flanders hills were:

Number	Name	Kilometer	Pavement	Length (m)	Average climb (%)
17	Kluisberg	99	asphalt	1250	5,3
16	Nokereberg	118	cobbles	375	5,9
15	Molenberg	157	cobbles/asphalt	463	7
14	Wolvenberg	167	asphalt	645	7,9
13	Oude Kwaremont	185	cobbles/asphalt	2200	4
12	Paterberg	189	cobbles	360	12,9
11	Koppenberg	195	cobbles	600	11,6
10	Steenbeekdries	200	cobbles	700	5,3
9	Taaienberg	203	cobbles	530	6,6
8	Berg Ter Stene	213	asphalt	1300	5
7	Leberg	216	cobbles	950	4,2
6	Berendries	222	asphalt	940	7
5	Valkenberg	227	asphalt	540	8,1
4	Tenbosse	233	asphalt	455	6,4
3	Eikenmolen	239	asphalt	610	5,9
2	Muur-Kapelmuur	249	cobbles	475	9,3
1	Bosberg	252	cobbles/asphalt	980	5,8

After Bosberg there was still 12 kilometers to go.

== Individual 2008 UCI ProTour standings after race ==
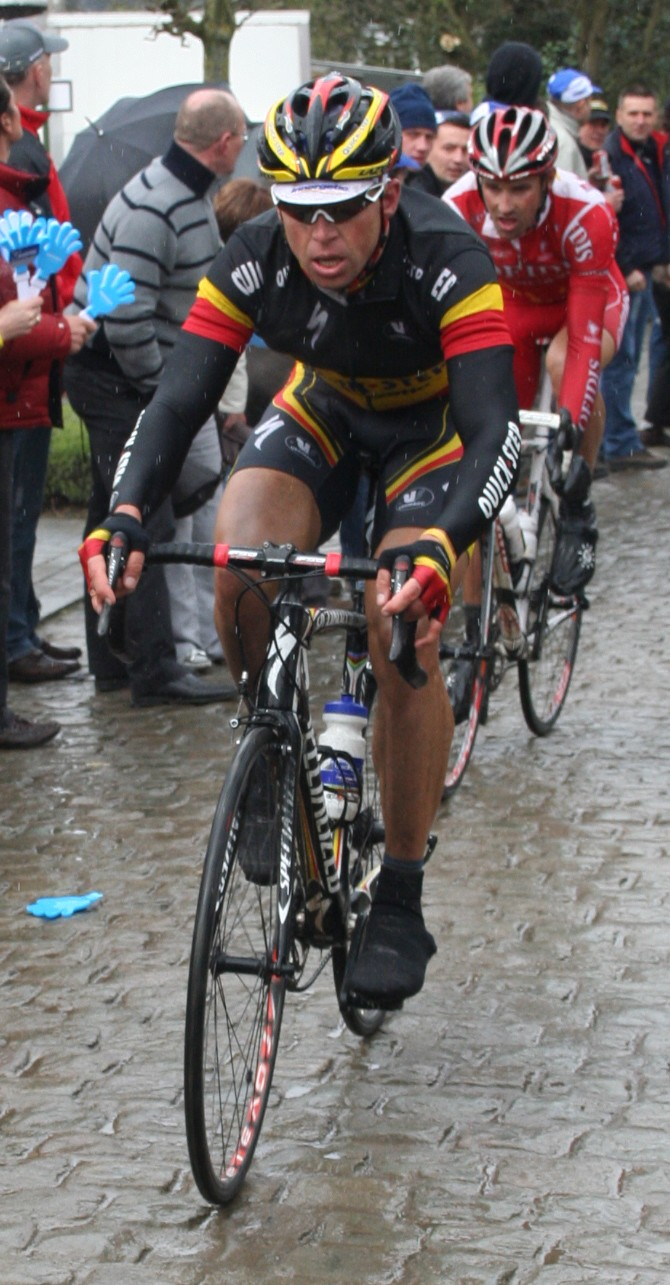
Stijn Devolder on the Oude Kwaremont cobbles.

Rank	Previous Rank	Name	Team	Points
1	1	André Greipel (GER)	Team High Road	62
2	-	Stijn Devolder (BEL)	Quick-Step	50
3	-	Nick Nuyens (BEL)	Cofidis	40
4	2	José Joaquín Rojas (ESP)	Caisse d'Epargne	38
5	-	Juan Antonio Flecha (ESP)	Rabobank	35
6	3	Mickaël Delage (FRA)	Française des Jeux	30
6	-	Alessandro Ballan (ITA)	Lampre	30
8	4	Mickaël Buffaz (FRA)	Rabobank	25
8	-	George Hincapie (USA)	Team High Road	25
10	5	José Alberto Benítez (ESP)	Saunier Duval–Scott	21

== See also ==
- 2008 in road cycling
