= Kevin van Impe =

Belgian cyclist

Kevin Van Impe
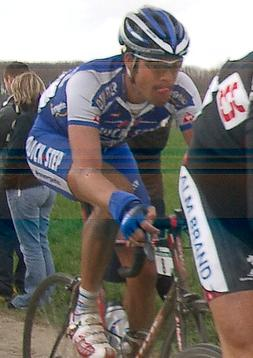

Personal information
- Full name: Kevin Van Impe
- Born: 19 April 1981 (age 45) Aalst, Belgium
- Height: 1.88 m (6 ft 2 in)
- Weight: 75 kg (165 lb)

Cycling career
- Sport: Cycling
- Current team: Retired
- Discipline: Road
- Role: Rider

Professional teams
- 2002–2004: Lotto–Adecco
- 2005: Chocolade Jacques–T Interim
- 2006–2011: Quick-Step–Innergetic
- 2012: Vacansoleil–DCM

Major wins
- One-day races and Classics Dwars door Vlaanderen (2009)

Kevin Van Impe (born 19 April 1981 in Aalst, East Flanders) is a retired Belgian professional road bicycle racer. His father is former cyclist Frank Van Impe, and his uncle is Lucien Van Impe, one of the greatest climbers in cycling history and winner of the 1976 Tour de France.

A routine out of competition drugs test performed on Van Impe caused controversy in March 2008. Van Impe was asked to give a sample for testing whilst at a crematorium making funeral arrangements for his deceased son, and was warned that failure to provide a sample would count as a refusal to give a sample, for which sanctions apply. Professional cyclists racing in the Paris–Nice and Tirreno–Adriatico performed demonstrations over the lack of respect shown to Van Impe.

Van Impe retired in March 2012, having only joined the Vacansoleil–DCM team in January of that year.

== Major results ==
1999
1st Time trial, National Under–19 Road Championships
2000
3rd Time trial, National Under–23 Road Championships
2002
1st GP Zele
2003
1st Stage 1 Rheinland-Pfalz Rundfahrt
2004
8th Overall Circuit Franco-Belge
9th Overall Tour of Britain
9th Brussel–Ingooigem
2005
1st Omloop van het Houtland
2nd Road race, National Road Championships
2nd Kuurne–Brussels–Kuurne
6th Kampioenschap van Vlaanderen
2006
1st Overall Circuit Franco-Belge

1st Young rider classification
1st Stage 1

9th Kuurne–Brussels–Kuurne
9th Halle–Ingooigem
2007
9th Paris–Roubaix
2009
1st Dwars door Vlaanderen
