= Gerben Löwik =

Dutch cyclist

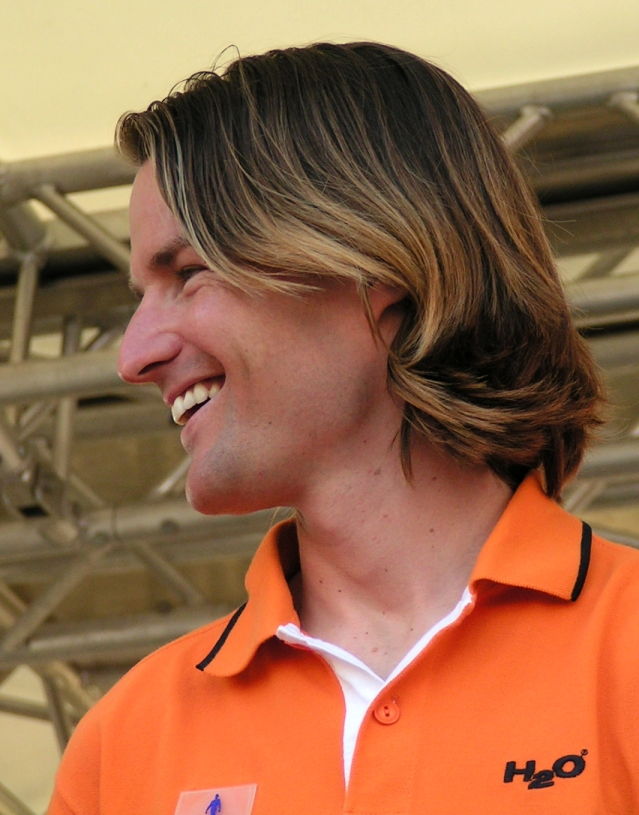

Personal information
- Full name: Gerben Löwik
- Born: 29 June 1977 (age 49) Vriezenveen, the Netherlands
- Height: 1.88 m (6 ft 2 in)
- Weight: 72 kg (159 lb)

Cycling career
- Sport: Cycling
- Discipline: Road
- Role: Rider

Amateur team
- 1996–1999: Giant–Löwik

Professional teams
- 2000: Farm Frites
- 2001: Rabobank
- 2002–2003: Bankgiroloterij
- 2004: Chocolade Jacques–Wincor Nixdorf
- 2005–2008: Rabobank
- 2009: Vacansoleil
- 2010: Omega Pharma–Lotto

Major wins
- Tour de la Région Wallonne (2004); Circuit Franco-Belge (2003); Ster Elektrotoer (2003)

Gerben Löwik (born 29 June 1977 in Vriezenveen, Overijssel) is a Dutch former professional road bicycle racer.

== Major results ==
1998
1st ZLM Tour
5th Road race, European Under-23 Road Championships
1999
1st Stage 6 Sachsen Tour
2000
9th Hel van het Mergelland
2001
8th Veenendaal–Veenendaal
9th Delta Profronde
2002
5th Ronde van Midden-Zeeland
6th Overall Tour of Sweden
6th Le Samyn
9th Tour Beneden-Maas
2003
1st Overall Circuit Franco-Belge

1st Stage 1

1st Overall Ster Elektrotoer

1st Points classification

1st GP Stad Vilvoorde
1st Stage 2 Deutschland Tour
3rd Trofeo Alcudia
3rd Tour Beneden-Maas
4th Overall Grote Prijs Erik Breukink

1st Points classification

6th GP Aarhus
6th Grand Prix S.A.T.S.
6th Grand Prix Pino Cerami
7th Schaal Sels
8th Rund um den Henninger Turm
8th Luk-Cup Bühl
2004
1st Overall Tour de Wallonie
1st Profronde van Fryslan (with 21 others)
3rd Overall Three Days of De Panne
3rd Kuurne–Brussels–Kuurne
4th Memorial Rik Van Steenbergen
4th GP Stad Zottegem
4th Nokere Koerse
5th HEW Cyclassics
5th Grand Prix d'Ouverture La Marseillaise
6th GP Rudy Dhaenens
8th Tour de Rijke
10th Overall Circuit Franco-Belge
2005
5th Veenendaal–Veenendaal
2006
4th Overall Ster Elektrotoer
2008
9th Trofeo Pollença
10th Overall Giro della Provincia di Grosseto
2009
7th Paris–Tours
8th Gran Piemonte
8th Grote Prijs Jef Scherens
8th Grand Prix d'Isbergues
9th Eschborn–Frankfurt
