= Daniele Bennati =

Italian road bicycle racer (born 1980)

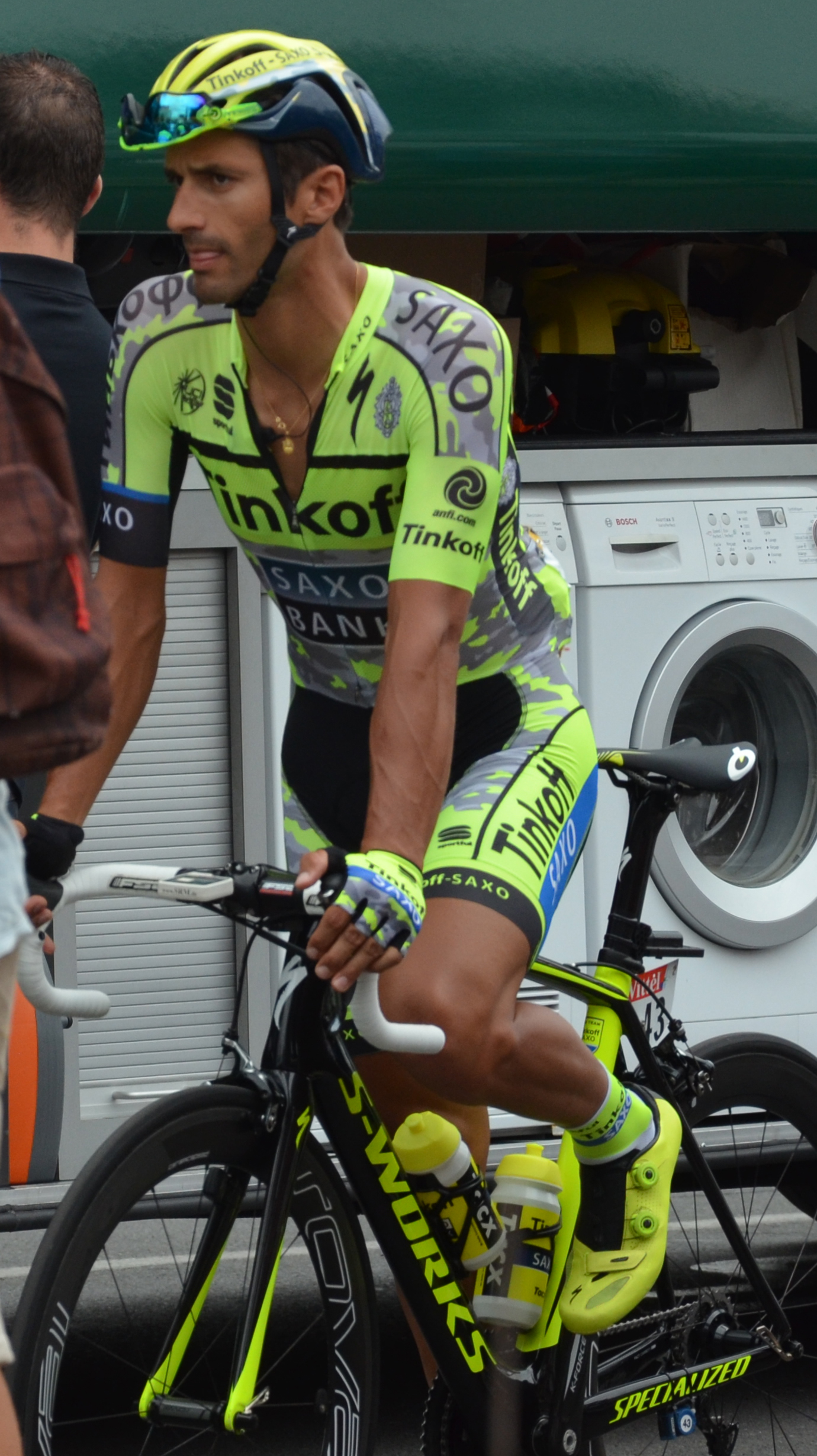
- Bennati at the 2015 Tour de France

Personal information
- Full name: Daniele Bennati
- Nickname: Benna
- Born: 24 September 1980 (age 46) Arezzo, Italy
- Height: 1.84 m (6 ft 1/2 in)
- Weight: 73 kg (161 lb; 11 st 7 lb)

Cycling career
- Sport: Cycling
- Discipline: Road
- Role: Rider
- Rider type: Sprinter

Professional teams
- 2002: Acqua & Sapone–Cantina Tollo
- 2003: De Nardi–Colpack
- 2004: Phonak
- 2005–2007: Lampre–Caffita
- 2008–2010: Liquigas
- 2011–2012: Leopard Trek
- 2013–2016: Saxo–Tinkoff
- 2017–2019: Movistar Team

Major wins
- Grand Tours Tour de France 2 individual stages (2007) Giro d'Italia Points classification (2008) 3 individual stages (2008) Vuelta a España Points classification (2007) 6 individual stages (2007, 2008, 2011, 2012) 2 TTT (2008, 2011) One-day races and Classics Giro del Piemonte (2006, 2008)

Daniele Bennati (born 24 September 1980) is an Italian former road racing cyclist, who rode professionally between 2002 and 2019 for the Acqua & Sapone–Cantina Tollo, De Nardi–Colpack, Phonak, Lampre–Fondital, Liquigas–Doimo, RadioShack–Nissan, Tinkoff and Movistar Team squads.

Specialising in fast sprint finishes, Bennati turned professional in 2002, when he joined the team Acqua & Sapone–Cantina Tollo and wore zebra stripes as part of Mario Cipollini's leadout train. Upon joining the Lampre–Caffita team in 2005, he demonstrated the ability to win on his own, and continued to do so when he joined Liquigas in 2008. Bennati has won 11 stages in Grand Tours: two in the Tour de France, three in the Giro d'Italia, and six in the Vuelta a España. He won the points jersey in the 2007 Vuelta a España, and the Giro d'Italia.

He retired at the end of the 2019 season, citing back pain.

== Biography ==
=== Early days ===
Bennati was born in Arezzo, Tuscany, into a family of cyclists. His father did well as an amateur, and his brother raced as a junior. Bennati entered and won his first race at the age of 9. As an amateur he raced in the Grassi Mapei team, and won a stage of the Giro delle Regioni.

=== 2002–03: At the side of Mario Cipollini ===
At the age of 21, Bennati turned professional and joined the Acqua & Sapone–Cantina Tollo team of the successful Italian sprinter Mario Cipollini. Bennati soon showed an ability to sprint of his own: in March 2002, he finished second in a stage of the Settimana internazionale di Coppi e Bartali, behind Alessandro Petacchi. He took his first victory in June at the Tour of Austria, and he took another one two months later at the Regio-Tour. He was an important part of Cipollini's leadout train, alongside Guido Trenti, Mario Scirea, Martin Derganc and Giovanni Lombardi, helping Cipollini to some of his fourteen victories that year. When Cipollini dropped out of the Vuelta a España, Bennati received his team's support and managed his first strong result in a Grand Tour sprint stage, 5th at the stage twelve finishing in Burgos. A few days later, he dropped out of the race too.

In 2003, Bennati stayed with the same team, although it had changed sponsors and was now called De Nardi–Colpack. As his stature grew, Bennati was seen at Cipollini's side in his favorite Italian races. In the Grand Tours, Cipollini followed his usual practice of dropping out when the road went up, which gave Bennati a chance to race for himself – he was second to Alessandro Petacchi in one of the stages of the Giro d'Italia. His two wins for the year came in stages of the Tour Méditerranéen (in February) and in the Tour of Poland (in September).

=== 2004: Phonak – A difficult season ===
At the end of 2003, Bennati signed a contract with the Phonak team. However, his year in the Swiss team was spoiled by a virus that forced him to drop out of Tirreno–Adriatico, and was followed by a recovery of several months. He did not get any victories during that season. In 2005, he signed a contract with the Italian team Saeco, which then merged with Lampre to form Lampre–Caffita, a larger team that designed to compete in the UCI ProTour.

=== 2005–07: Lampre – the breakout years ===
==== 2005 season ====
At Lampre, Bennati grew from a promising domestique into a top sprinter. This transition was not instantaneous: early in 2005, he finished sprints behind both his old leader Cipollini, and teammate Giosuè Bonomi. Nevertheless, he accumulated a number of good finishes: 5th in a stage of Tirreno–Adriatico and 28th at Milan–San Remo. His first important result was in Gent–Wevelgem, where he outsprinted Thor Hushovd and Fabian Cancellara for 3rd place, behind the breakaway of Nico Mattan and Juan Antonio Flecha. He tested positive for Betamethasone after the race, but was only handed a warning by the Italian Cycling Federation. A few weeks later, Bennati won the Giro di Toscana. He did not compete in the Giro d'Italia – where Lampre concentrated on the overall victory with Gilberto Simoni and Damiano Cunego – nor did he ride the Tour de France. In August, he won three stages and the points jersey in the Tour of Germany, and had good placings in important races such as the Grand Prix de Plouay (4th), the Coppa Placci (5th), and the Giro di Romagna (2nd). September brought two more stage victories in the Tour of Poland. Thanks to these results, he was chosen for the Italian national team that competed in the UCI Road World Championships in Madrid, but the team leader, Paolo Bettini, finished only 13th. At the season's close, Bennati was ranked 28th in the UCI Pro Tour standings, and had become a rider to watch.

==== 2006 season ====
During the off-season, Bennati's team changed its secondary sponsor, becoming Lampre–Fondital, and signed another promising Italian sprinter, Danilo Napolitano, setting up a competition for the top sprinter's spot on the team. Bennati started the 2006 season with two second places in the Gran Premio della Costa Etruschi (behind Alessandro Petacchi, who had taken over Cipollini's mantle as the dominant Italian sprinter), and then took his first win of the season in February's Volta a la Communitat Valenciana, four seconds ahead of the peloton, led home by Napolitano. In March, Bennati was due to be the team's leader for the important races. He probably was not at his best form when he started the Tour of Flanders, and he had to drop out. He was then unable to start the Gent–Wevelgem race. Ten days later, however, a fully recovered Bennati won the final stage of the Giro del Trentino, won overall by teammate Cunego. The next week, he competed in the Tour de Romandie, where Robbie McEwen showed that Bennati was not quite at the top level.

The Lampre team for the Giro d'Italia was again built around the overall competition, and Bennati was not included. Instead, he participated in the Volta a Catalunya, winning the final stage ahead of Erik Zabel. In early June, he outsprinted his two breakaway companions to win the Memorial Marco Pantani. Although he could only manage 2nd and 3rd places in the Tour of Switzerland, he did wear the leader's jersey for one day and won the points jersey. July brought Bennati to his first Tour de France; he was among the top ten finishers in eight stages, including a 2nd place behind McEwen. He dropped out after a fall during the 16th stage; he was third in the points jersey competition at the time. Two months later, Bennati returned to the Tour of Poland, where he won two stages and wore the leader's jersey for two days.

The following weekend, he won two more races: the GP Citta di Misano-Adriatico and the Gran Premio Industria e Commercio di Prato, but was not chosen for the Italian UCI Road World Championships team, as selector Franco Ballerini opted to do without any sprinters. Although his result in the sprinters' classic, Paris–Tours, was disappointing (37th), Bennati ended his season with a victory at the Giro del Piemonte. This brought him to a total of 9 victories in 2006, but he dropped to 87th place in the Pro Tour standings – largely due to his absence from the spring classics due to illness.

==== 2007 season ====
Bennati spent much of his off-season training in the Canary Islands (with Daniele Righi, Giuliano Figueras, Caudio Corioni, and Mauro Santambrogio) and began the 2007 racing season with two wins in February. In the Tour Méditerranéean he won one stage, with strong support from his teammate Alessandro Ballan, had two 2nd places – marginally beaten in one stage by Mirco Lorenzetto – and won the points jersey. After a fourth place at the Trofeo Laigueglia, Bennati outsprinted Alessandro Petacchi for three wins in the Volta a la Communidat Valenciana. Unlike previous years, Bennati did not compete in Tirreno–Adriatico, choosing to ride Paris–Nice instead, where he had some high finishes but no victories. Once again, he was stricken by illness just prior to Milan–San Remo, where he finished 26th, and the Grand Prix E3 was a disappointment for the same reason.

Bennati's form improved in the beginning of April, where he won one stage of the Dreidaagse De Panne. In the Tour of Flanders, he worked hard for Ballan, who won in a sprint ahead of Leif Hoste. Although he was one of the favorites for the mid-week classic Gent–Wevelgem, Bennati had to withdraw because of a fever and intestinal difficulties. He started Paris–Roubaix but did not make it to the finish. His troubles continued into May; Bennati had to drop out of the Volta a Catalunya, though he did manage a third place in one stage. In the Tour of Switzerland he recovered his health and won the points jersey; although he had no stage victories, he had a second place in the prologue, behind Fabian Cancellara, and second places in two other stages as well, behind Erik Zabel and Robbie McEwen respectively. A few days later, Bennati took 6th place in the Italian National Road Race Championships.

In July, Bennati rode in the Tour de France for the second time; he now had enough stature that his goals of winning a stage and competing for the points jersey were considered reasonable. As his team had no rider for the overall standings, he could count on help from his teammates Ballan, Napolitano, and Corioni. However, he fell in the last kilometer of the second stage and was not able to unleash his sprint until he had recovered somewhat from his injuries. In the fifth stage, he finished 3rd, behind Filippo Pozzato and Óscar Freire. There followed a 6th place, a 4th place, some unsuccessful breakaways, and then, after the last mountain stages, Bennati won twice, including the prestigious final stage on the Champs-Elysees. On the strength of his successes, he was named the leader of the Lampre team for the Vattenfall Cyclassics race, but watched as his teammate Ballan took off from the peloton and held on to win.

In September, Bennati raced in his second Grand Tour of the season, the 2007 Vuelta a España. He won the first stage ahead of Freire and Petacchi, and wore the leader's jersey for a day, losing it after a fall two kilometers from the finish of the second stage. After two second places, he came into his own during the final week, just as he had in the Tour de France: Bennati won the 17th stage and then the final stage in Madrid, taking the leadership in the contest for the points jersey on the final day of the race. This victory, his tenth of 2007, marked the end of Bennati's season. Although he had been scheduled to compete in the Monte Paschi Eroica and Paris–Tours, he was found to have a broken wrist that ruled out any more racing.

During the final week of the Vuelta a España, Bennati had signed a two-year contract with a new team: Liquigas. Claudio Corioni and Enrico Franzoi, valuable teammates who formed an important part of his leadout train, also signed for Liquigas.

=== 2008–10: Liquigas ===
==== 2008 season ====
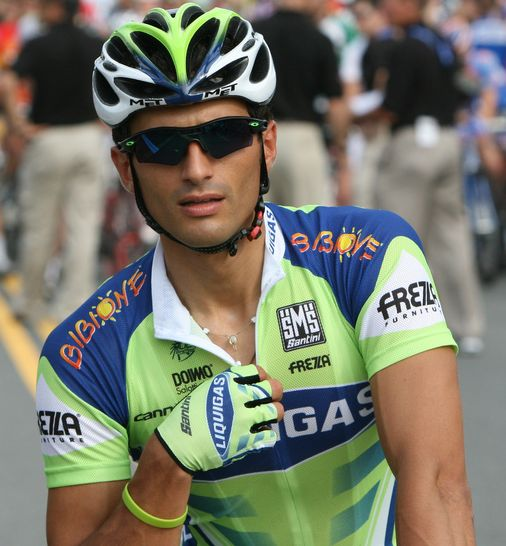
Bennati at the 2008 Philadelphia International Championship.

The move to Liquigas brought up some potential frictions: they now had two stars, Bennati and Filippo Pozzato, whose primary targets for the year would be similar. Any conflict in their spring racing goals disappeared, however, with Bennati's knee injury – a slight patellar chondropathy in the left knee, associated with inflammation of the lateral ligament – keeping him out of action until the end of April. He did not finish his first race back (the Giro d'Oro, but in his next race, the Giro del Trentino, he took 17th in the opening time trial but did not figure in any of the stage finishes. The Tour de Romandie opened with a very short prologue, where Bennati took second behind Mark Cavendish. He also took second behind Robbie McEwen in the first sprint finish, showing that he was coming back into form. This was confirmed with a victory in the final stage, giving him first place in the points classification.

The 2008 Giro d'Italia was a success for Bennati, and was marked by a series of battles with Cavendish. Bennati won the third stage, into Milazzo; the following day, Cavendish won the stage to Lungomare, his first Grand Tour win. The next sprinters' stage was the ninth; Bennati won, by a whisker, over Paolo Bettini, who was racing his final Giro d'Italia. Bennati also won the 12th stage, with a narrow margin over Cavendish; the order was reversed the following day. His three stage victories in a Giro with few stages suitable for sprinters also gave Bennati the points jersey. However, Bennati paid a price for the points jersey: the long pull in cold weather over the Mortirolo Pass caused an inflammation of Bennati's left Achilles tendon, the same leg as the knee injury.

He did not return to competition until August, at the Eneco Tour. There he was second to Tom Boonen in the second stage before winning the third stage and taking the leader's jersey for a day. He was dropped in the fourth stage, finishing in 88th place 22 seconds behind Boonen and losing the lead in the GC to André Greipel. Bennati then dropped out of the Eneco Tour and proceeded to the Vuelta a España in good form – where Pozzato was also a team leader. The Liquigas team won the first stage, a team time trial, with Pozzato crossing the line first and donning the leader's jersey. Bennati served as a domestique for Pozzato during the second stage, but when Pozzato did not retain the leader's jersey he was able to ride for himself. He was 2nd to Boonen the following day, and then won the fourth stage, ahead of Boonen but dropped out after the 9th stage. Bennati was not named to the Italian team for the UCI Road World Championships, and his bad luck in Paris–Tours, the sprinters’ classic, continued; he finished 8th in a race won by Philippe Gilbert. However, Bennati won his final race of the year, the Giro del Piemonte; it was his second victory in this race, which he also won in 2006.

=== 2011–12: Leopard Trek ===
At the Vuelta a España, Bennati took his first win of the 2012 season in a very close finish on stage 18, edging Team Sky's sprinter Ben Swift. He dedicated his victory to the memory of Wouter Weylandt and of his grandfather. Bennati left RadioShack–Nissan at the end of the 2012 season, and joined Bjarne Riis' Saxo–Tinkoff on a two-year contract from the 2013 season onwards.

=== 2013–16: Saxo–Tinkoff ===
On Saxo–Tinkoff, Bennati managed to be a part of the team for the 2013 Tour de France, even though it was highly occupied by riders like Alberto Contador, Nicolas Roche, Michael Rogers and Roman Kreuziger. His goal for the Tour de France was not to win a stage, but to help Contador to get the overall victory.

== Major results ==
2001
10th Road race, UCI Under-23 Road World Championships
2002 (2 pro wins)
1st Stage 1b Tour of Austria
1st Stage 5 Regio-Tour
3rd Gran Premio Nobili Rubinetterie
2003 (2)
1st Stage 3 Tour de Pologne
1st Stage 5 Tour Méditerranéen
4th Giro di Toscana
2004
8th Trofeo Manacor
2005 (6)
1st Giro di Toscana
Deutschland Tour

1st Points classification
1st Stages 3, 5 & 9

Tour de Pologne

1st Stages 2 & 4

2nd Giro della Romagna
2nd Paris–Tours
3rd Gent–Wevelgem
4th GP Ouest–France
5th Giro della Provincia di Lucca
5th Coppa Placci
6th Gran Premio della Costa Etruschi
2006 (8)
1st Giro del Piemonte
1st Gran Premio Città di Misano – Adriatico
1st Gran Premio Industria e Commercio di Prato
1st Mercatone Uno-Memorial Pantani
Tour de Pologne

1st Stages 2 & 4

1st Stage 7 Volta a Catalunya
1st Stage 5 Volta a la Comunitat Valenciana
1st Stage 4 Giro del Trentino
1st Points classification, Tour de Suisse
2nd Gran Premio della Costa Etruschi
2007 (10)
Tour de France

1st Stages 17 & 20

Vuelta a España

1st Points classification
1st Stages 1, 17 & 21

Volta a la Comunitat Valenciana

1st Points classification
1st Stages 1, 3 & 5

1st Stage 2 Tour Méditerranéen
1st Points classification, Tour de Suisse
3rd Gran Premio della Costa Etruschi
4th Trofeo Laigueglia
9th Overall Three Days of De Panne

1st Points classification
1st Stage 1

2008 (7)
1st Giro del Piemonte
Giro d'Italia

1st Points classification
1st Stages 3, 9 & 12

Vuelta a España

1st Stages 1 (TTT) & 4

Tour de Romandie

1st Points classification
1st Stage 5

1st Stage 3 Eneco Tour
8th Paris–Tours
2009 (4)
1st Overall Giro di Sardegna

1st Stage 4

Vuelta a Mallorca

1st Trofeo Inca
4th Trofeo Cala Millor

6th Milan–San Remo
7th Vattenfall Cyclassics
10th Overall Giro della Provincia di Grosseto

1st Stage 1

2010 (3)
1st Giro di Toscana
1st Stage 3 Tirreno–Adriatico
5th Overall Tour of Oman

1st Stage 2

5th Milan–San Remo
5th Coppa Bernocchi
6th Vattenfall Cyclassics
2011 (6)
Circuit de la Sarthe

1st Points classification
1st Stages 1, 3 (ITT) & 5

Vuelta a España

1st Stages 1 (TTT) & 20

1st Stage 3 Tour de Wallonie
1st Stage 8 Tour of Austria
2nd Overall Danmark Rundt
2nd Gent–Wevelgem
3rd Overall Tour of Qatar
7th Giro del Piemonte
10th Gran Premio Industria e Commercio di Prato
2012 (1)
1st Stage 18 Vuelta a España
5th Trofeo Palma de Mallorca
6th Gent–Wevelgem
7th Gran Piemonte
10th Milan–San Remo
2013
2nd Gran Premio Nobili Rubinetterie
5th GP Ouest–France
2015 (1)
1st Gran Premio Industria e Commercio di Prato
3rd Time trial, National Road Championships
7th Gran Piemonte
2016 (3)
1st Overall Giro di Toscana
Danmark Rundt

1st Points classification
1st Stage 1

1st Stage 1 Vuelta a Andalucía
3rd Gran Piemonte
8th Overall Dubai Tour
2017
5th Overall Circuit de la Sarthe
2018
7th Trofeo Campos, Porreres, Felanitx, Ses Salines
2019
4th Overall Vuelta a Castilla y León

=== Grand Tour general classification results timeline ===
Grand Tour	2002	2003	2004	2005	2006	2007	2008	2009	2010	2011	2012	2013	2014	2015	2016	2017	2018
Giro d'Italia	—	DNF	DNF	—	—	—	70	—	—	—	DNF	DNF	—	—	—	DNF	—
Tour de France	—	—	—	—	DNF	74	—	132	—	—	—	107	96	DNF	—	104	104
Vuelta a España	DNF	—	—	—	—	63	DNF	84	83	111	144	—	108	131	107	—	133

=== Classics results timeline ===
Monument	2002	2003	2004	2005	2006	2007	2008	2009	2010	2011	2012	2013	2014	2015	2016	2017	2018	2019
Milan–San Remo	—	65	—	28	—	26	—	6	5	13	10	28	18	DNF	DNF	14	91	144
Tour of Flanders	—	DNF	—	53	—	19	—	DNF	DNF	—	94	DNF	DNF	—	—	—	—	—
Paris–Roubaix	—	DNF	—	DNF	—	DNF	—	—	—	—	86	—	—	—	—	41	—	DNF
Liège–Bastogne–Liège	Did not contest during career																	
Giro di Lombardia	—	—	—	—	—	—	—	—	—	—	—	—	—	DNF	—	—	—	—
Classic	2002	2003	2004	2005	2006	2007	2008	2009	2010	2011	2012	2013	2014	2015	2016	2017	2018	2019
Strade Bianche	Race did not exist					—	—	11	—	DNF	11	—	51	61	54	—	DNF	—
Gent–Wevelgem	—	DNF	—	3	—	DNF	—	—	26	2	6	DNF	18	—	—	24	DNF	—
Hamburg Cyclassics	93	82	—	DNF	55	73	—	7	6	—	—	56	—	—	—	—	—	—
GP Ouest-France	—	—	—	4	DNF	—	—	18	—	—	—	5	—	—	—	21	—	—
Paris–Tours	101	—	—	2	37	—	8	—	42	—	—	—	—	—	—	—	—	—

Legend
—	Did not compete
DNF	Did not finish
