= Luca Paolini =

Italian cyclist

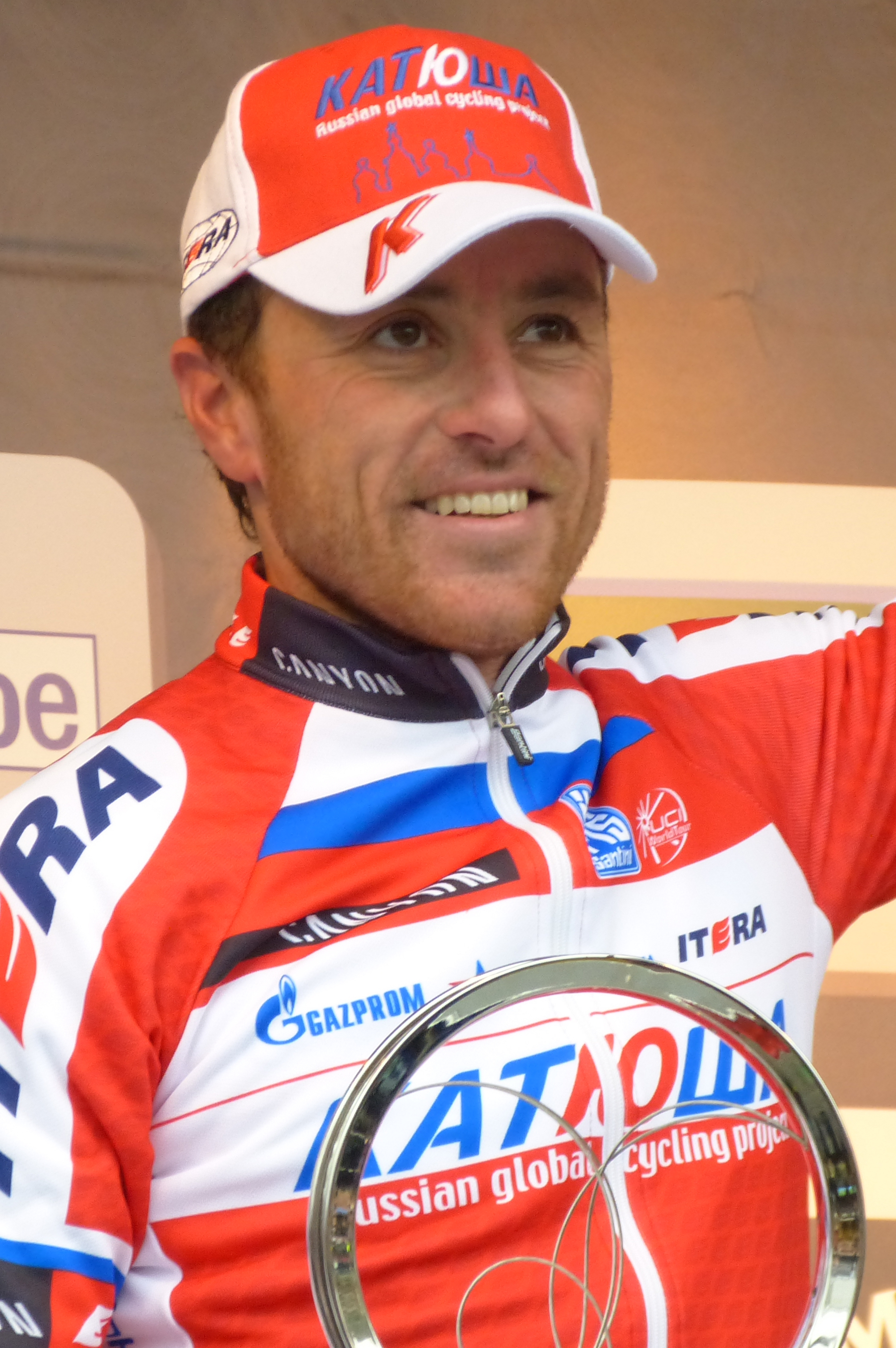
- Paolini at the 2013 Omloop Het Nieuwsblad

Personal information
- Full name: Luca Paolini
- Nickname: Il Gerva
- Born: 17 January 1977 (age 49) Milan, Italy
- Height: 1.74 m (5 ft 9 in)
- Weight: 66 kg (146 lb)

Cycling career
- Sport: Cycling
- Current team: Retired
- Discipline: Road
- Role: Rider
- Rider type: Classics specialist

Professional teams
- 2000–2002: Mapei–Quick-Step
- 2003–2005: Quick-Step–Davitamon
- 2006–2007: Liquigas
- 2008–2010: Acqua & Sapone–Caffè Mokambo
- 2011–2015: Team Katusha

Major wins
- Grand Tours Giro d'Italia 1 individual stage (2013) Vuelta a España 1 individual stage (2006) One-day races and Classics Gent–Wevelgem (2015) Omloop Het Nieuwsblad (2013) Brabantse Pijl (2004) Giro del Piemonte (2002)
Medal record
Representing Italy
Men's road bicycle racing
World Championships
Bronze medal – third place	2004 Verona	Elite Men's Road Race

Luca Paolini (born 17 January 1977) is an Italian former road bicycle racer, who rode professionally between 2000 and 2015. He started his sports career in the early 2000s by joining Mapei–Quick-Step (2000–2002), UCI ProTeam directed by Patrick Lefevere. Within Mapei-Quick Step and then its successor team Quick-Step–Innergetic (2003–2005), Luca Paolini achieved several victories. Among them were first places at Gran Premio di Lugano, Giro del Piemonte and Gran Premio Bruno Beghelli. He has also won stages at Tour of Britain and Tour de Wallonie.

== Career ==
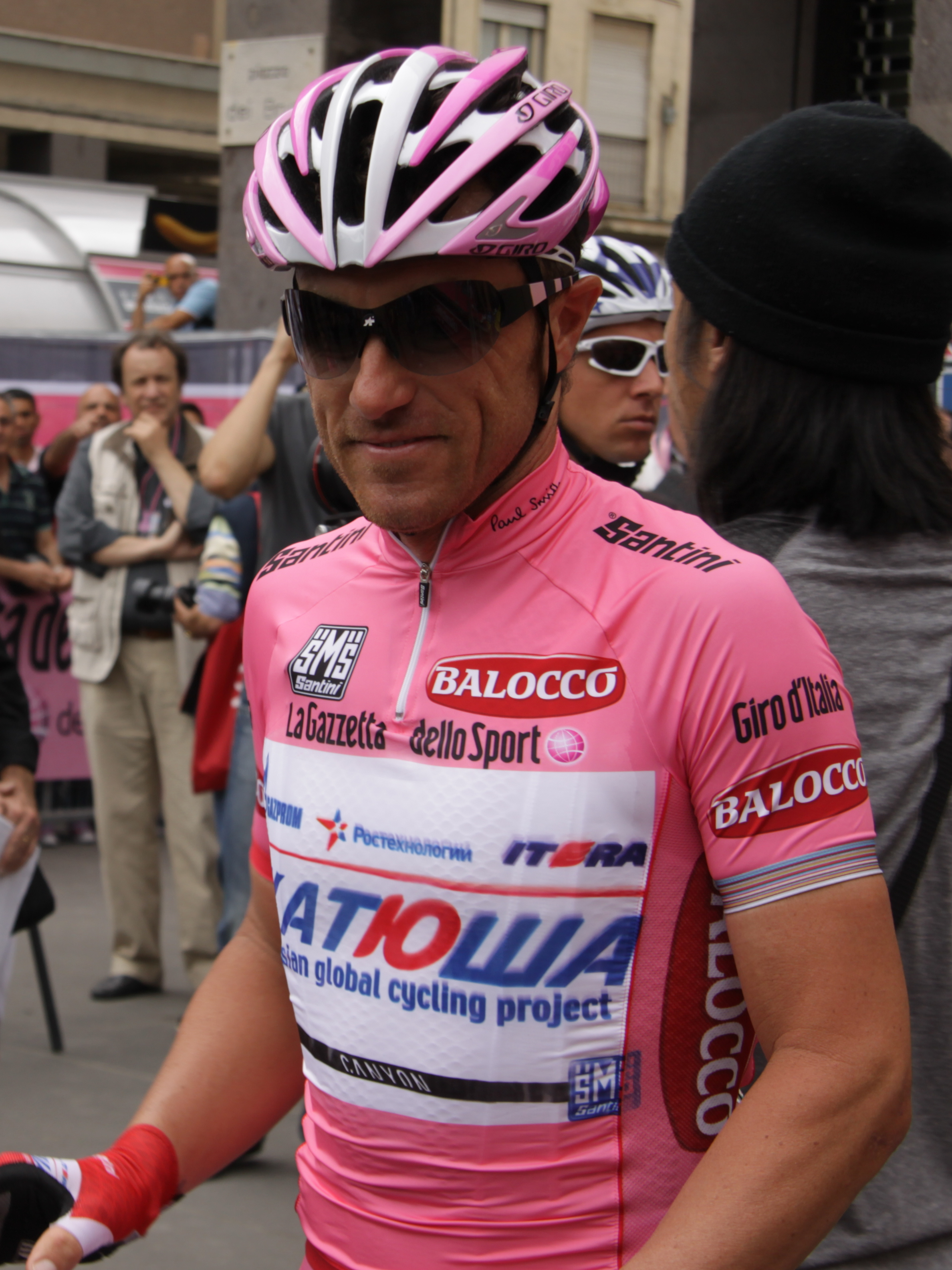
Paolini in the Maglia Rosa at the 2013 Giro d'Italia

Paolini was born in Milan. Seasons 2006–2007 and 2008–2010 Luca Paolini spent in two Italian cycling team – Liquigas and Acqua & Sapone respectively. As their member, he triumphed at certain stages of Vuelta a España and Three Days of De Panne, won one-day races Gran Premio Città di Camaiore, Trofeo Laigueglia, Coppa Placci as well as Coppa Bernocchi. Meanwhile, his bright victories attracted a particular attention from anti-doping bodies. As his name appeared in taped phone conversations together with Ivan Basso and his sister Elisa, he was suspected in illegal drugs usage. In September 2006 Paolini's home was searched in a doping investigation which was called Operazione Athena – however it appears that no evidence was found that led to any conviction of Paolini's fault, so Team Liquigas refused to suspend him.

In 2011, he was signed by Russian Team Katusha to be a domestique for Filippo Pozzato both at classics and Grand Tours. However, due to Pozzato's poor performance and traumas in season 2011, he switched to other co-riders and pursued his personal goals in the peloton. In autumn 2011 he finished third at Giro del Piemonte having taken his first podium for Team Katusha. In 2013, Paolini took the Omloop Het Nieuwsblad after breaking away from the leading group with Omega Pharma–Quick-Step's Stijn Vandenbergh. The pair resisted and Paolini won the sprint after Vandenburgh took long pulls in the final kilometers. In Milan – San Remo, Paolini finished in the lead group in fifth position, as MTN–Qhubeka's Gerald Ciolek won the race.

In 2015, Paolini won a very windy and difficult edition of Gent–Wevelgem, as only 39 riders out of 160 finished the race. Paolini attacked his breakaway companions with five kilometers to go and benefited from a disorganized chase to win solo. In May, it was announced that Paolini's contract with Katusha had been extended by a year, finishing at the end of 2016.

=== Doping case ===
In the 2015 Tour de France, Paolini tested positive for cocaine and was thrown out of the race after Stage 7. His contract with Katusha was nullified. He revealed that he had been suffering from an addiction to the sleeping drug benzodiazepine and claimed to have taken cocaine "at a low point in his life".

In April 2016, he was banned from competition for 18 months, with the UCI judging that he had not intended to breach the anti-doping rules, as they do not prohibit the use of cocaine outside competition. Katusha confirmed that he would not be able to return to the team.

Paolini's ban expired in January 2017, however in an interview that month he said that he had retired from racing after being unable to find a team, and had invested in a coffee bar in Como. He also stated that he had overcome his addiction to benzodiazepine.

== Major results ==
1999
1st Trofeo Città di Brescia
1st Gran Premio di Poggiana
2nd Road race, UCI Under-23 Road World Championships
2nd Giro del Mendrisiotto
2000
Tour de l'Avenir

1st Points classification
1st Stage 1

1st Stage 3 Tour de Normandie
1st Mountains classification, Danmark Rundt
5th Gran Premio della Costa Etruschi
2001
1st Gran Premio di Lugano
4th Giro del Piemonte
5th Coppa Bernocchi
2002
1st Giro del Piemonte
2nd Overall Tour de la Région Wallonne
4th Japan Cup
8th Coppa Bernocchi
8th Coppa Placci
9th Criterium d'Abruzzo
9th Tre Valli Varesine
10th Gran Premio di Chiasso
10th Gran Premio Bruno Beghelli
2003
1st Gran Premio Bruno Beghelli
2nd Coppa Sabatini
3rd Milan–San Remo
3rd Brabantse Pijl
6th Overall Vuelta a Andalucía
7th Paris–Brussels
8th Road race, UCI Road World Championships
8th Paris–Tours
9th Overall Tirreno–Adriatico
2004
1st Brabantse Pijl
3rd Road race, UCI Road World Championships
3rd Gran Premio Città di Camaiore
5th Trofeo Laigueglia
2005
Tour of Britain

1st Points classification
1st Stages 3 & 6

1st Stage 3 Tour de la Région Wallonne
2nd HEW Cyclassics
8th GP Ouest–France
2006
1st Gran Premio Città di Camaiore
1st Stage 12 Vuelta a España
3rd Coppa Bernocchi
3rd Milan–San Remo
4th Trofeo Matteotti
Vuelta a Mallorca

6th Trofeo Cala Millor
10th Trofeo Mallorca

7th E3 Prijs Vlaanderen
2007
3rd Giro della Romagna
3rd Tour of Flanders
4th Coppa Bernocchi
10th Overall Three Days of De Panne

1st Stage 1

2008
1st Trofeo Laigueglia
1st Coppa Placci
2nd Giro del Piemonte
3rd Paris–Brussels
4th Giro della Romagna
5th Gran Premio Industria e Commercio Artigianato Carnaghese
6th Gent–Wevelgem
7th Overall Giro della Provincia di Grosseto
7th GP Industria & Artigianato di Larciano
10th Overall Three Days of De Panne
2009
1st Coppa Bernocchi
1st Stage 6 Settimana Ciclistica Lombarda
2nd Memorial Cimurri
3rd Road race, National Road Championships
3rd Gran Premio Industria e Commercio di Prato
3rd Giro del Veneto
4th Gran Premio Bruno Beghelli
4th Giro del Piemonte
4th Giro di Lombardia
6th Gran Premio della Costa Etruschi
9th Milan–San Remo
2010
3rd Overall Three Days of De Panne

1st Points classification

3rd Coppa Ugo Agostoni
4th Omloop Het Nieuwsblad
4th Giro del Veneto
6th Trofeo Laigueglia
6th Giro del Friuli
6th Dwars door Vlaanderen
6th Gran Premio Industria e Commercio di Prato
10th Milan–San Remo
10th Gent–Wevelgem
10th Grand Prix de Wallonie
2011
2nd Gran Premio Industria e Commercio di Prato
3rd Giro del Piemonte
4th Coppa Ugo Agostoni
5th Omloop Het Nieuwsblad
10th Gran Premio Bruno Beghelli
2012
2nd Gran Premio Industria e Commercio di Prato
2nd Gran Piemonte
4th Grand Prix Cycliste de Québec
4th Grand Prix de Wallonie
7th Tour of Flanders
9th Road race, Olympic Games
9th Grand Prix Cycliste de Montréal
10th GP Ouest–France
2013
1st Omloop Het Nieuwsblad
Giro d'Italia

1st Stage 3
Held after Stage 3–6

5th Milan–San Remo
8th E3 Harelbeke
2015
1st Gent–Wevelgem

=== Grand Tour general classification results timeline ===
Grand Tour	2001	2002	2003	2004	2005	2006	2007	2008	2009	2010	2011	2012	2013	2014	2015
Giro d'Italia	—	—	—	—	—	—	—	—	—	—	—	—	59	111	111
Tour de France	—	—	69	—	—	101	—	—	—	—	—	108	—	136	DNF
Vuelta a España	106	—	—	DNF	—	DNF	—	—	—	—	135	—	107	—	—

=== Classics results timeline ===
Monument	2000	2001	2002	2003	2004	2005	2006	2007	2008	2009	2010	2011	2012	2013	2014	2015
Milan–San Remo	—	—	64	3	83	—	3	12	—	9	10	122	12	5	33	30
Tour of Flanders	—	—	—	39	26	—	32	3	—	—	—	57	7	23	36	52
Paris–Roubaix	—	—	—	—	—	—	—	—	—	—	DNF	DNF	11	21	74	44
Liège–Bastogne–Liège	—	DNF	68	DNF	69	—	—	—	—	—	—	—	—	—	—	—
Giro di Lombardia	—	DNF	DNF	DNF	—	44	—	—	DNF	4	DNF	11	DNF	—	—	
Classic	2000	2001	2002	2003	2004	2005	2006	2007	2008	2009	2010	2011	2012	2013	2014	2015
Omloop Het Nieuwsblad	—	—	—	—	—	—	DNF	—	—	—	4	5	12	1	DNF	—
Kuurne–Brussels–Kuurne	—	—	—	12	113	—	DNF	—	—	—	DNF	24	19	NH	46	—
Dwars door Vlaanderen	—	—	—	—	—	—	—	—	—	—	6	—	—	—	—	—
E3 Harelbeke	—	—	—	—	—	—	7	DNF	—	—	DNF	—	28	8	13	33
Gent–Wevelgem	—	39	—	—	—	—	DNF	19	6	—	10	116	24	54	DNF	1
Brabantse Pijl	—	—	—	3	1	—	DNF	42	—	—	—	—	—	—	—	—
Hamburg Cyclassics	—	33	135	13	31	2	14	—	—	—	—	—	—	—	—	—
GP Ouest–France	—	—	12	—	—	8	—	—	—	—	—	—	10	—	126	—
Grand Prix Cycliste de Québec	Race did not exist										—	—	4	—	—	—
Grand Prix Cycliste de Montréal	Race did not exist										—	—	9	—	—	—
Paris–Tours	43	11	120	8	152	DNF	30	—	—	—	—	—	—	—	—	—

=== Major championships results timeline ===
	2000	2001	2002	2003	2004	2005	2006	2007	2008	2009	2010	2011	2012	2013	2014	2015
Olympic Games	—	Not held			39	Not held			—	Not held			9	Not held		
World Championships	—	—	—	8	3	72	38	—	DNF	65	38	106	75	DNF	—	—
National Championships	—	—	—	—	—	—	—	—	5	3	—	10	—	—	DNF	—

Legend
—	Did not compete
DNF	Did not finish
NH	Not held
DNS	Did not start

== See also ==
- List of doping cases in cycling
