= 2013 GP Ouest-France =

2013 UCI World Tour, race 24 of 28

Race details
- Dates: 1 September 2013
- Stages: 1
- Distance: 243 km (151.0 mi)
- Winning time: 5h 59' 54"

Results
	Winner	Filippo Pozzato (Italy)	(Lampre–Merida)
	Second	Giacomo Nizzolo (Italy)	(RadioShack–Leopard)
	Third	Samuel Dumoulin (France)	(Ag2r–La Mondiale)

The 2013 GP Ouest-France was the 77th edition of the GP Ouest-France, a single-day cycling race. It was held on 1 September 2013, over a distance of 243 km (151.0 mi), starting and finishing in Plouay, France. It was the twenty-fourth race of the 2013 UCI World Tour season.

The race was won by Lampre–Merida's Filippo Pozzato, Pozzato finished ahead RadioShack–Leopard's Giacomo Nizzolo and Ag2r–La Mondiale's Samuel Dumoulin, who completed the podium.

== Teams ==
As the GP Ouest-France was a UCI World Tour event, all 19 UCI ProTeams were invited automatically and obligated to send a squad. Five other squads were given wildcard places into the race, and as such, formed the event's 24-team peloton.

The 24 teams that competed in the race were:

- Ag2r–La Mondiale
- Argos–Shimano
- Astana
- Belkin Pro Cycling
- BMC Racing Team
- Bretagne–Séché Environnement †
- Cannondale
- Cofidis †
- Euskaltel–Euskadi
- FDJ.fr
- Garmin–Sharp
- IAM Cycling †
- Team Katusha
- Lampre–Merida
- Lotto–Belisol
- Movistar Team
- Omega Pharma–Quick-Step
- Orica–GreenEDGE
- RadioShack–Leopard
- Sojasun †
- Team Europcar †
- Saxo–Tinkoff
- Team Sky
- Vacansoleil–DCM

== Results ==
	Cyclist	Team	Time	UCI World Tour Points
1	Filippo Pozzato (ITA)	Lampre–Merida	5h 59' 54"	80
2	Giacomo Nizzolo (ITA)	RadioShack–Leopard	s.t.	60
3	Samuel Dumoulin (FRA)	Ag2r–La Mondiale	s.t.	50
4	Jürgen Roelandts (BEL)	Lotto–Belisol	s.t.	40
5	Daniele Bennati (ITA)	Saxo–Tinkoff	s.t.	30
6	Thor Hushovd (NOR)	BMC Racing Team	s.t.	22
7	Elia Viviani (ITA)	Cannondale	s.t.	14
8	Francisco Ventoso (ESP)	Movistar Team	s.t.	10
9	Borut Božič (SLO)	Astana	s.t.	6
10	John Degenkolb (GER)	Argos–Shimano	s.t.	2
