= Filippo Pozzato =

Italian cyclist (born 1981)

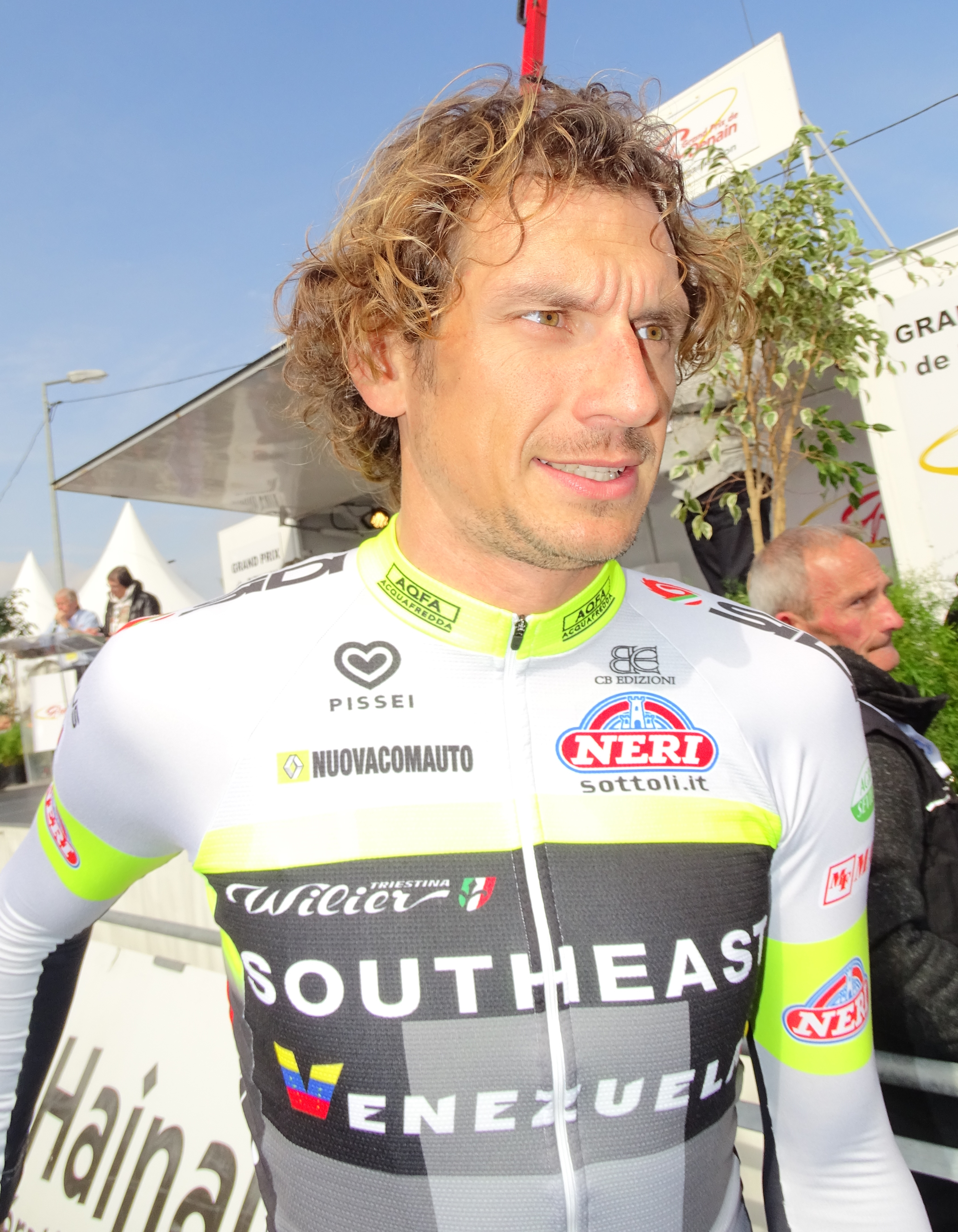
- Pozzato at the 2016 Grand Prix de Denain

Personal information
- Full name: Filippo Pozzato
- Nicknames: Pippo; The Peacock of Sandrigo
- Born: 10 September 1981 (age 45) Sandrigo, Italy
- Height: 1.83 m (6 ft 0 in)
- Weight: 73 kg (161 lb; 11.5 st)

Cycling career
- Sport: Cycling
- Current team: Retired
- Discipline: Road
- Role: Rider
- Rider type: Classics specialist

Professional teams
- 2000–2002: Mapei–Quick-Step
- 2003–2004: Fassa Bortolo
- 2005–2006: Quick-Step–Innergetic
- 2007–2008: Liquigas
- 2009–2011: Team Katusha
- 2012: Farnese Vini–Selle Italia
- 2013–2015: Lampre–Merida
- 2016–2018: Southeast–Venezuela

Major wins
- Grand Tours Tour de France 2 individual stages (2004, 2007) Giro d'Italia 1 individual stage (2010) Vuelta a España 1 TTT stage (2008) Stage races Tirreno–Adriatico (2003) One-day races and Classics National Road Race Championships (2009) Milan–San Remo (2006) GP Ouest-France (2013) E3 Prijs Vlaanderen (2009) Omloop Het Volk (2007) Hamburg Cyclassics (2005)

Filippo "Pippo" Pozzato (born 10 September 1981) is an Italian former road racing cyclist, who rode professionally between 2000 and 2018 for the Mapei–Quick-Step, Fassa Bortolo, Quick-Step–Innergetic, Liquigas, Team Katusha, Lampre–Merida, and two spells with the Farnese Vini–Selle Italia/Wilier Triestina–Selle Italia teams.

A northern classics specialist, Pozzato finished in second place at both the 2009 Paris–Roubaix and the 2012 Tour of Flanders. Pozzato finished a total of 37 Monument classics, including a victory in the 2006 Milan–San Remo; he finished second in the race in 2008 as well. Pozzato also won stages at the 2004 Tour de France, the 2007 Tour de France and the 2010 Giro d'Italia, and was the winner of the 2009 Italian National Road Race Championships.

== Career ==
=== Mapei–Quick-Step (2000–2002) ===
Born in Sandrigo, Veneto, Pozzato turned professional in 2000 with the Mapei–Quick-Step team, part of the famous classe di '81 (English: Class of '81) a group of emerging young riders born in 1981 who were part of the Mapei TT3 development team, along with Fabian Cancellara, Bernhard Eisel and Alexandr Kolobnev. Pozzato took his first victories with the team at the 2002 Vuelta a Cuba, and took his first success in Europe at the Giro del Lago Maggiore the following month. Before the season was finished, Pozzato had taken eleven further victories, including four stages at the Tour de Normandie.

=== Fassa Bortolo (2003–2004) ===
After Mapei ended its sponsorship in 2002 Pozzato joined Giancarlo Ferretti's Fassa Bortolo team for the 2003 season. He took early-season victories at the Trofeo Laigueglia and the Giro dell'Etna, before he won a stage and the general classification at Tirreno–Adriatico. He took one further victory during the season, at the Trofeo Matteotti. The following year, Pozzato won the final stage of the Giro della Liguria in February, before repeating his victory at the Trofeo Laigueglia. He made his first start at a Grand Tour at the Tour de France – where he was the youngest rider at the race – and won the seventh stage. He was also chosen to be part of the Italian team for the road race at the Athens Olympics – in support of team leader Paolo Bettini, who went on to win the event.

=== Quick Step–Innergetic (2005–2006) ===
Personality clashes with Giancarlo Ferretti meant that Pozzato suffered poor years with Fassa Bortolo, and thus, re-established contact with several managers and directeurs sportif of Quick-Step–Innergetic. The Quick-Step–Innergetic team expressed interest and Pozzato was able to obtain a release for the 2005 UCI ProTour season, joining several former Mapei riders already on the team, such as Paolo Bettini and Davide Bramati. Having finished second at the Italian National Road Race Championships for the second time in three years in 2005, Pozzato's first victory with the Quick-Step–Innergetic team came with a win in the HEW Cyclassics, ahead of teammate Luca Paolini. He followed this up with another victory the following weekend in the Giro del Lazio, with a third victory ultimately following at the Deutschland Tour, where he won the second stage.

The 2006 season saw him win the first major classic of the year Milan–San Remo after a superb ride which saw him first work for team leader Tom Boonen, but then was forced to launch his own winning attack in the finale. He was unable to defend his victory in the renamed Vattenfall Cyclassics, finishing third behind Óscar Freire and Erik Zabel. His only other victory of the 2006 season came at the Tour of Britain, where he won the third stage of the race into Sheffield, having attacked from a six-rider lead group after the final categorised climb. He moved up to third overall, a position he continued to hold at the end of the race.

=== Liquigas (2007–2008) ===
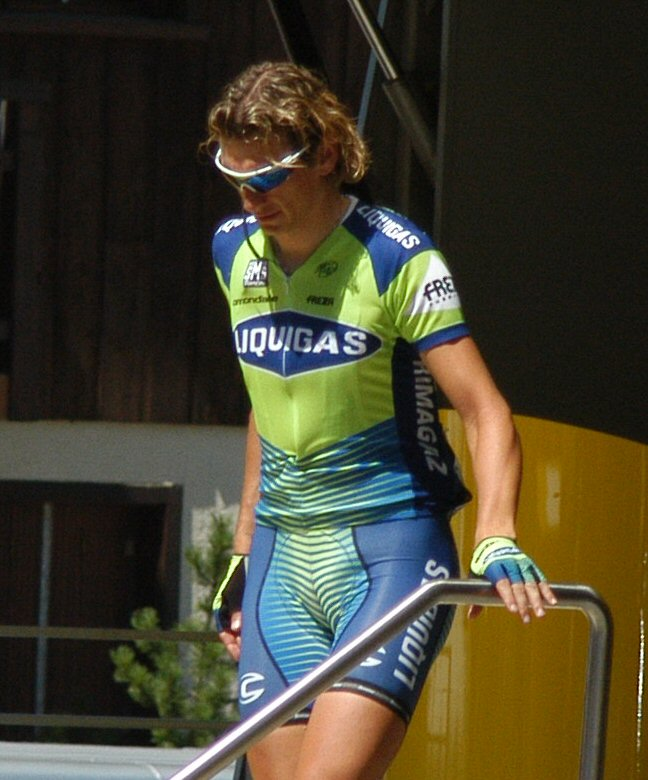
Pozzato at the 2007 Tour de France, where he won the fifth stage of the race

For the 2007 season, Pozzato joined the Liquigas squad, and during the early part of the season, he won consecutive starts at the Tour du Haut Var, and Omloop Het Volk. Having finished third on the second stage of the Tour de France, Pozzato took his second career stage win three stages later, prevailing in the bunch sprint into Autun. Following the Tour de France, Pozzato took three further victories in the 2007 season; he won the Trofeo Matteotti in August, before winning the sixth stage of the Tour de Pologne and the Gran Premio Industria e Commercio di Prato in September.

In his first European start of the 2008 season, Pozzato won the opening stage of the inaugural Giro della Provincia di Grosseto in February, going on to win the general classification at the race as well. He recorded a top-ten overall finish at Tirreno–Adriatico the following month, before finishing second at Milan–San Remo, four seconds behind race winner Fabian Cancellara. He recorded his first top-ten finish at the Tour of Flanders, finishing in sixth place, before another podium finish in the Italian National Road Race Championships with third place. After no successes at the Tour de France, Pozzato rode the Vuelta a España for the first time in his career. Liquigas won the opening team time trial stage and with Pozzato crossing the finish line first, he assumed the gold jersey of race leader. He would ultimately lose the jersey to Alejandro Valverde the following day, and withdrew from the race prior to stage 19. He finished the season with two further second-place finishes at the Giro del Lazio and the Coppa Sabatini.

=== Team Katusha (2009–2011) ===
In July 2008, Pozzato was announced to be joining the new Team Katusha for the 2009 season. Having finished second to Francesco Ginanni at February's Trofeo Laigueglia, Pozzato's first victory with Team Katusha came the following month at E3 Prijs Vlaanderen, winning a three-rider sprint against Tom Boonen and Maxim Iglinsky. He followed this up with a win on the opening stage of the Three Days of De Panne, and top-five finishes at the Tour of Flanders (fifth), and Paris–Roubaix (second); at the latter, Pozzato claimed that when avoiding a crash of Thor Hushovd he lost 4 or 5 seconds and the chance for victory and that race winner Boonen benefited from the slipstream of official motorcycles to augment his lead. In June, Pozzato won the Italian National Road Race Championships for the first time in his professional career, prevailing in a sprint finish of around 20 riders at the Imola Circuit. He took two further victories before the end of the season – winning August's Giro del Veneto from a four-rider group, and October's Memorial Cimurri from a larger group.

In 2010 he was accused by several riders, including Björn Leukemans, Boonen and Philippe Gilbert for his "negative tactics" during key races – the previous season, Boonen had referred to Pozzato as "The Shadow". Pozzato won a stage of the Giro d'Italia for the first time; having missed out to Matthew Goss in a bunch sprint on stage nine, Pozzato won stage twelve from a small group that had gone clear on the final climb before the finish in Porto Recanati – for Italy's first stage win of the race. He led the Italian team for the road race at the UCI Road World Championships in Australia, where he missed on a medal, ending up in fourth place in the sprint finish. Following the World Championships, Pozzato's performances over the season were criticised by his team manager Andrei Tchmil.

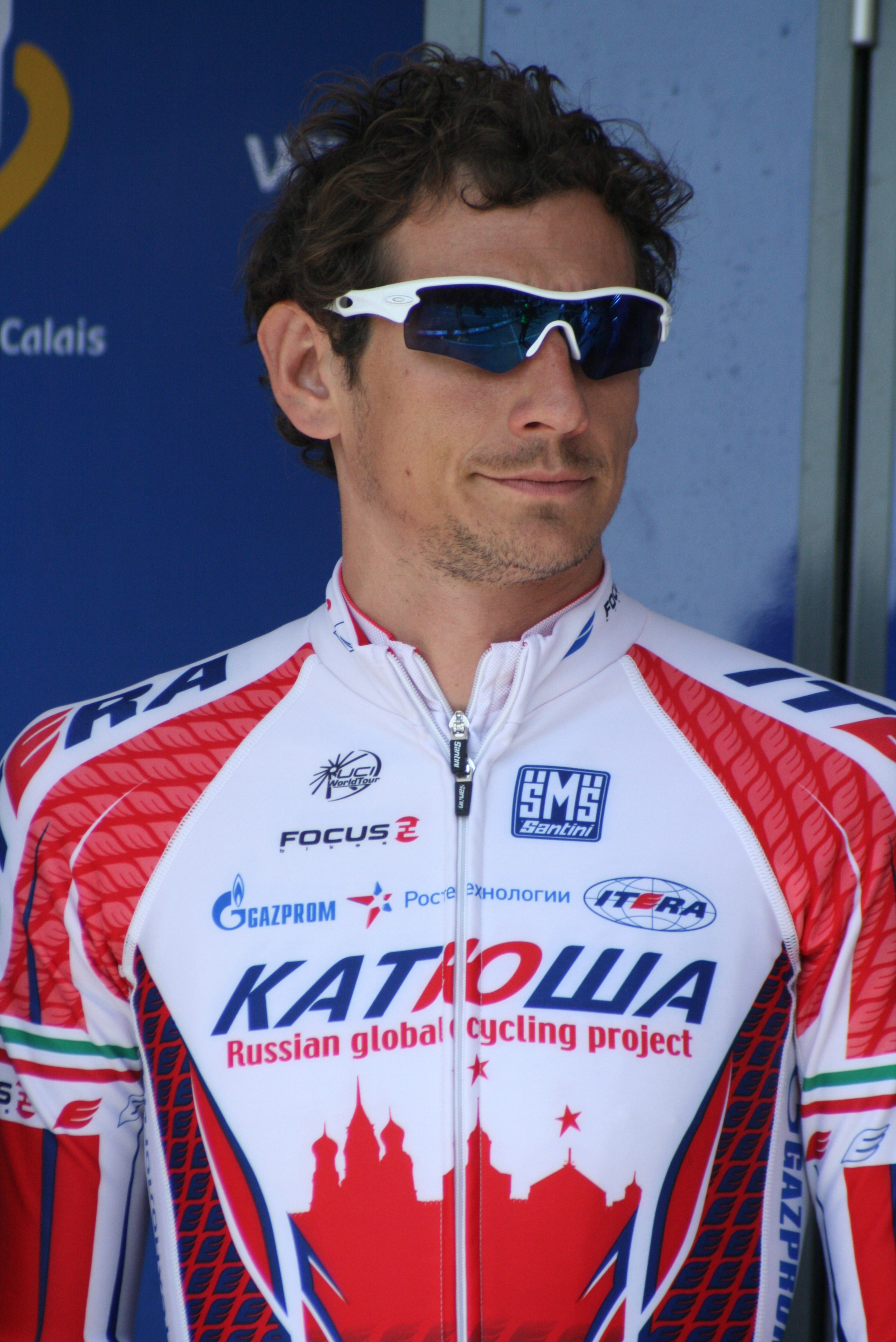
Pozzato at the 2011 Four Days of Dunkirk

The following year, Pozzato was part of the lead group at Milan–San Remo; he chased down Philippe Gilbert's attack in the final 2 kilometres (1.2 miles), but this effected his ability to sprint at the end, ultimately finishing in fifth place. He then finished in third place overall at the Tour de Picardie in May – tied on time with second-placed Kenny Dehaes – but he would miss two months of racing action following a crash on the final stage of the Tour of Belgium. Ultimately, his only victory of the 2011 season came in October – when he took a solo victory at the Gran Premio Bruno Beghelli, some 19 seconds clear of the next closest rider.

=== Farnese Vini–Selle Italia (2012) ===
In September 2011, and having been linked with both Lampre–ISD and Team Europcar, Pozzato signed a contract to ride with UCI Professional Continental team Farnese Vini–Neri Sottoli, later renamed as Farnese Vini–Selle Italia for the 2012 season. In the spring classics, Pozzato took four top-ten results – two of which where he finished as part of the lead group – with a best of second place coming at the Tour of Flanders, where he was outsprinted by home rider Tom Boonen. He then won April's GP Industria & Artigianato di Larciano from a small group, but this would turn out to be his only win of an injury-blighted season. He was also suspended for three months, backdated to June, for his links to Michele Ferrari, who had been given a lifetime ban from the sport earlier in the year.

=== Lampre–Merida (2013–2015) ===
Pozzato left Farnese Vini–Selle Italia after only one season, signing a three-year contract with Lampre–Merida from the 2013 season.

Pozzato earned his first victory of 2013 in the Trofeo Laigueglia, held in Liguria, Italy on mainly narrow, twisting and turning roads. His Lampre–Merida team reeled in the breakaway and controlled the front of the leading group when Mauro Santambrogio (Vini Fantini–Selle Italia) attacked with 3 kilometres (1.9 miles) to cover, with Pozzato jumping in his slipstream. The sprint was contested by four riders, with Pozzato getting the best of them, to take a record third victory at the race. The following month, he finished second at the Roma Maxima behind solo winner Blel Kadri, having celebrated what he thought was a victory on the finish line. It was not until August that Pozzato won another race, when he won the Coppa Agostoni from a group of some 20 riders; in September, he raced the GP Ouest-France and despite not being a top favourite, he won the race, becoming just the fifth Italian to do that. He also recorded high placings at the Gran Premio della Costa Etruschi (third) and the Grand Prix Cycliste de Montréal (fifth), making the Italian team for the road race at the UCI Road World Championships in Tuscany.

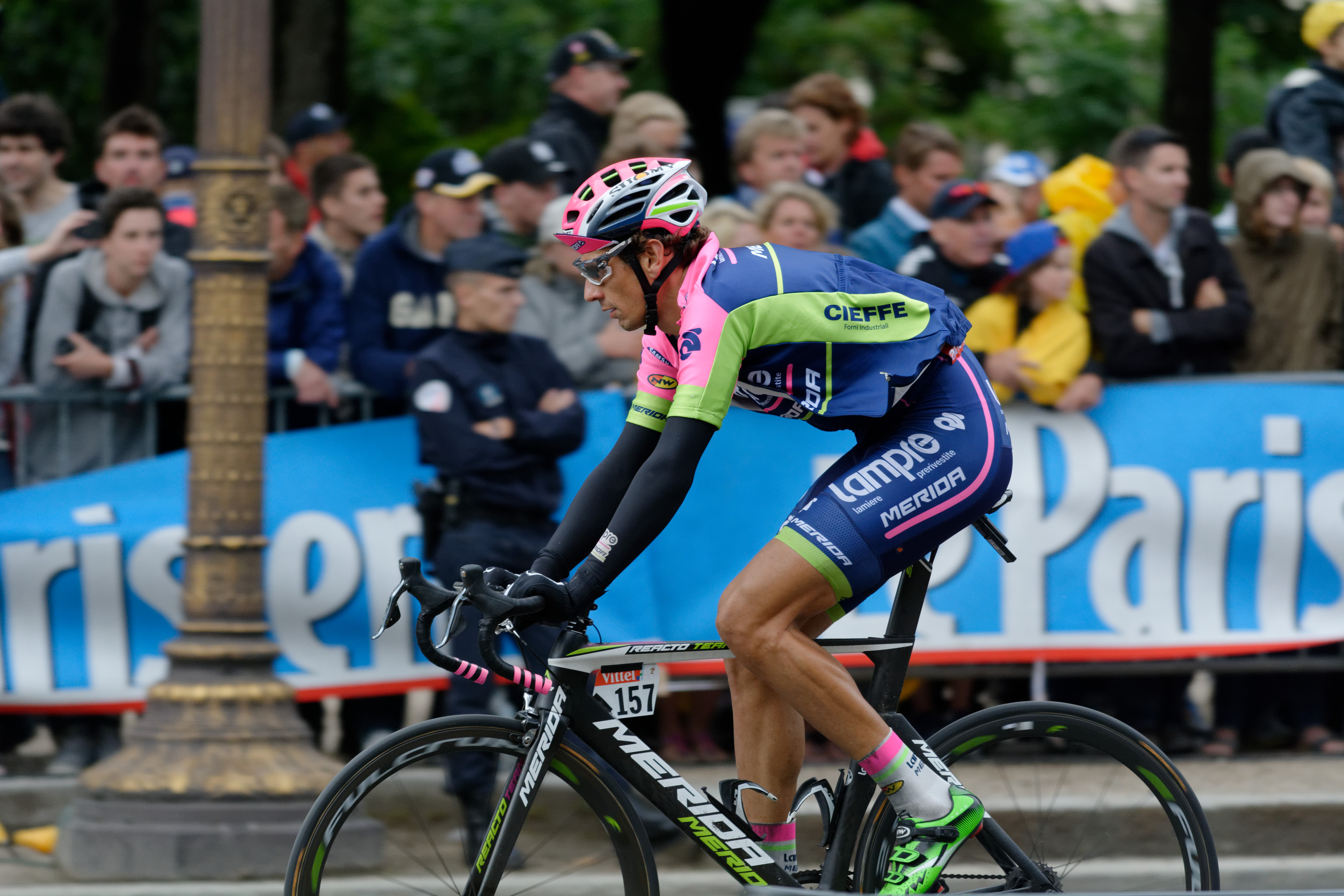
Pozzato at the 2015 Tour de France

Pozzato was overlooked for the Italian team to contest the road race at the 2014 UCI Road World Championships in Spain, with only two top-three results during the season – second at the Coppa Bernocchi, and third at Tre Valli Varesine. His lack of results did not go unnoticed as his team manager Brent Copeland referred to Pozzato as a "prima donna". Pozzato's performances in 2015 showed no improvement, with no top-three finishes over the season, and his best overall finish being a tenth-place result at the Dubai Tour.

=== Southeast–Venezuela (2016–2018) ===
In December 2015, Pozzato signed a two-year contract with the Italian-based Southeast–Venezuela team from 2016, and expected to retire at the end of the 2017 season. He returned to the top ten placings with an eighth-place finish at Milan–San Remo, and followed this up with fourth place at Dwars door Vlaanderen. His best result of the season came at September's Gran Premio Bruno Beghelli, where he finished second to Nicola Ruffoni. The following year, he recorded his first top-ten finish at the Tour of Flanders since his runner-up finish in 2012, placing eighth. He ultimately remained with the team in 2018, before retiring from the sport at the end of the season.

== Doping ban ==
In 2012, Pozzato was banned from cycling for three months by the Italian National Olympic Committee (CONI) after it was found that he had worked with infamous doctor Michele Ferrari from 2005 to 2008. CONI had looked to ban him for a year but were forced to reduce it to a three months thanks to a technicality.

== Major results ==
=== Road ===
1998
UCI World Junior Championships

2nd Road race
3rd Time trial

1999
4th Road race, UCI World Junior Championships
2000
10th Gran Premio Nobili Rubinetterie
2001
4th Giro del Mendrisiotto
8th Giro del Medio Brenta
9th Trofeo Luis Puig
9th Gran Premio Nobili Rubinetterie
9th Paris–Bourges
2002
1st Overall Vuelta a Cuba

1st Stage 11a (ITT)

1st Duo Normand (with Evgeni Petrov)
1st Giro del Lago Maggiore
1st Tour du Lac Léman
Tour de Normandie

1st Prologue, Stages 2, 3 & 5

Tour of Slovenia

1st Stages 4 & 7

Tour de l'Avenir

1st Stages 1 (ITT) & 5

1st Prologue Ytong Bohemia Tour
2nd Time trial, National Championships
5th Overall GP Erik Breukink
10th Chrono des Herbiers
2003 (5 pro wins)
1st Overall Tirreno–Adriatico

1st Stage 2

1st Trofeo Laigueglia
1st Trofeo Matteotti
1st Giro dell'Etna
1st Stage 6 (TTT) Tour Méditerranéen
2nd Road race, National Championships
2nd Giro della Provincia di Reggio Calabria
6th Omloop Het Volk
2004 (3)
1st Overall Giro della Liguria
1st Trofeo Laigueglia
1st Stage 7 Tour de France
4th Gran Premio Bruno Beghelli
2005 (3)
1st HEW Cyclassics
1st Giro del Lazio
1st Stage 2 Deutschland Tour
2nd Road race, National Championships
4th Overall Ster Elektrotoer
2006 (2)
1st Milan–San Remo
3rd Overall Tour of Britain

1st Stage 3

3rd Vattenfall Cyclassics
4th Gent–Wevelgem
5th Omloop Het Volk
6th GP Ouest-France
10th Züri-Metzgete
10th Paris–Tours
2007 (6)
1st Omloop Het Volk
1st Tour du Haut Var
1st Trofeo Matteotti
1st Gran Premio Industria e Commercio di Prato
1st Stage 5 Tour de France
1st Stage 6 Tour de Pologne
3rd Trofeo Laigueglia
4th GP Ouest-France
5th Memorial Cimurri
6th Gran Premio Città di Camaiore
2008 (2)
1st Overall Giro della Provincia di Grosseto

1st Stage 1

1st Stage 1 (TTT) Vuelta a España
2nd Milan–San Remo
2nd Giro del Lazio
2nd Coppa Sabatini
3rd Road race, National Championships
6th Tour of Flanders
7th Overall Tirreno–Adriatico
7th Trofeo Laigueglia
2009 (5)
1st Road race, National Championships
1st E3 Prijs Vlaanderen
1st Giro del Veneto
1st Memorial Cimurri
1st Stage 1 Three Days of De Panne
2nd Paris–Roubaix
2nd Trofeo Laigueglia
4th Paris–Tours
5th Tour of Flanders
5th Clásica de San Sebastián
2010 (1)
1st Stage 12 Giro d'Italia
1st Stage 3 (TTT) Vuelta a Burgos
3rd Giro del Piemonte
4th Road race, UCI World Championships
4th Montepaschi Strade Bianche
4th E3 Prijs Vlaanderen
5th Giro del Friuli
7th Paris–Roubaix
10th Omloop Het Nieuwsblad
2011 (1)
1st Gran Premio Bruno Beghelli
3rd Overall Tour de Picardie
5th Milan–San Remo
2012 (1)
1st GP Industria & Artigianato di Larciano
2nd Tour of Flanders
6th Milan–San Remo
6th Dwars door Vlaanderen
9th Gent–Wevelgem
2013 (3)
1st GP Ouest-France
1st Trofeo Laigueglia
1st Coppa Agostoni
2nd Roma Maxima
3rd Gran Premio della Costa Etruschi
5th Grand Prix Cycliste de Montréal
2014
2nd Coppa Bernocchi
3rd Tre Valli Varesine
2015
10th Overall Dubai Tour
2016
2nd Gran Premio Bruno Beghelli
3rd Road race, National Championships
4th Dwars door Vlaanderen
5th Coppa Bernocchi
7th Overall Giro di Toscana
8th Milan–San Remo
9th Gran Piemonte
2017
8th GP Industria & Artigianato di Larciano
8th Tour of Flanders

==== Grand Tour general classification results timeline ====
Grand Tour	2004	2005	2006	2007	2008	2009	2010	2011	2012	2013	2014	2015	2016	2017
Giro d'Italia	—	84	—	—	—	DNF	45	—	DNF	120	—	—	115	104
Tour de France	116	—	133	DNF	67	100	—	—	—	—	—	125	—	—
/ Vuelta a España	—	—	—	—	DNF	—	DNF	—	—	—	DNF	—	—	—

==== Classics results timeline ====
Monument	2003	2004	2005	2006	2007	2008	2009	2010	2011	2012	2013	2014	2015	2016	2017	2018
Milan–San Remo	DNF	63	—	1	19	2	22	29	5	6	33	30	41	8	31	52
Tour of Flanders	DNF	109	43	13	14	6	5	—	38	2	44	17	12	75	8	—
Paris–Roubaix	—	—	DNF	15	35	49	2	7	DNF	DNF	22	50	65	—	—	—
Liège–Bastogne–Liège	DNF	DNF	DNF	—	—	—	—	—	—	—	—	—	—	—	—	—
Giro di Lombardia	—	—	DNF	42	19	—	DNF	DNF	DNF	DNF	—	—	—	DNF	—	—
Classic	2003	2004	2005	2006	2007	2008	2009	2010	2011	2012	2013	2014	2015	2016	2017	2018
Omloop Het Nieuwsblad	6	—	—	5	1	—	92	10	DNF	DNF	86	—	—	57	—	—
Strade Bianche	Race did not exist				13	—	33	4	—	DNF	DNF	DNF	27	63	—	—
E3 Harelbeke	—	—	—	—	—	36	1	4	—	27	26	79	—	39	—	—
Gent–Wevelgem	—	DNF	52	4	41	13	DNF	—	64	9	39	DNF	DNF	—	—	—
Dwars door Vlaanderen	—	—	—	—	—	—	DNF	—	—	6	—	—	—	4	—	—
Clásica de San Sebastián	DNF	—	52	—	—	—	5	DNF	—	—	88	DNF	—	—	—	—
Hamburg Cyclassics	71	56	1	3	19	—	—	64	—	—	58	—	—	—	—	—
Bretagne Classic	—	—	—	6	4	48	21	—	39	—	1	—	—	—	DNF	DNF
Paris–Tours	—	—	14	10	82	42	4	57	—	—	—	—	—	—	—	—

Legend
—	Did not compete
DNF	Did not finish

=== Track ===
1998
2nd Team pursuit, UCI World Junior Championships
1999
3rd Team pursuit, UCI World Junior Championships
