= 2007 Omloop Het Volk =

2006–07 UCI Europe Tour
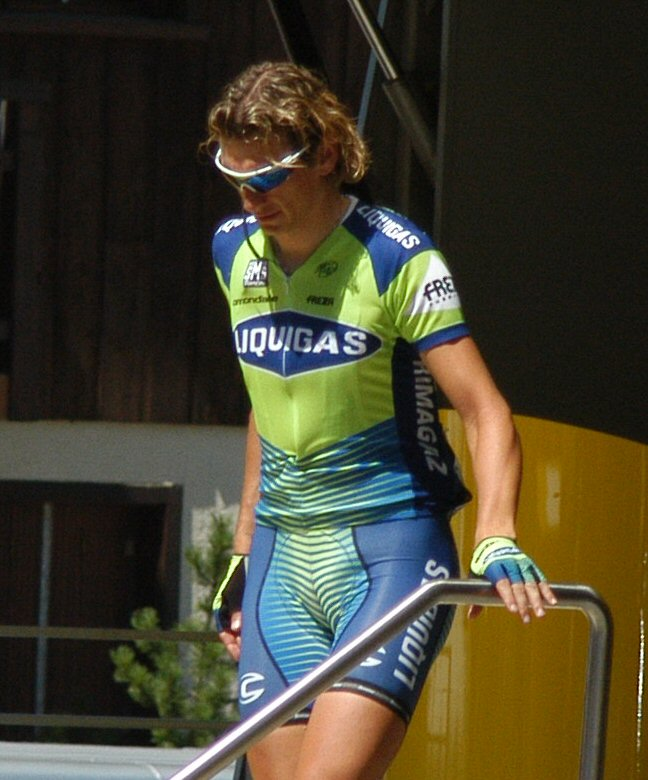
- Race winner Filippo Pozzato (pictured during the 2007 Tour de France)

Race details
- Dates: 3 March 2007
- Stages: 1
- Distance: 210 km (130 mi)
- Winning time: 5h 04' 38"

Results
	Winner	Filippo Pozzato (ITA)	(Liquigas)
	Second	Juan Antonio Flecha (ESP)	(Rabobank)
	Third	Tom Boonen (BEL)	(Quick-Step–Innergetic)

The 62nd edition of Omloop Het volk cycling event was held on 3 March 2007. The race was won by Italian rider Filippo Pozzato in a five-man sprint before Juan Antonio Flecha and Tom Boonen. It was ranked a 1.HC event of the 2006–07 UCI Europe Tour. The edition marked the last time the race finished in Lokeren before it moved back to Ghent.

== Results ==
Result
Rank	Rider	Team	Time
1	Filippo Pozzato (ITA)	Liquigas	5h 04' 38"
2	Juan Antonio Flecha (ESP)	Rabobank	+ 2"
3	Tom Boonen (BEL)	Quick-Step–Innergetic	+ 2"
4	Nick Nuyens (BEL)	Cofidis	+ 2"
5	Stuart O'Grady (AUS)	Team CSC	+ 2"
6	Baden Cooke (AUS)	Unibet.com	+ 30"
7	Gorik Gardeyn (BEL)	Unibet.com	+ 39"
8	Stefan van Dijk (NED)	Wiesenhof–Felt	+ 39"
9	Robbie McEwen (AUS)	Predictor–Lotto	+ 39"
10	Steven de Jongh (NED)	Quick-Step–Innergetic	+ 39"
