= Liquigas =

Italian cycling team

Cannondale Pro Cycling Team
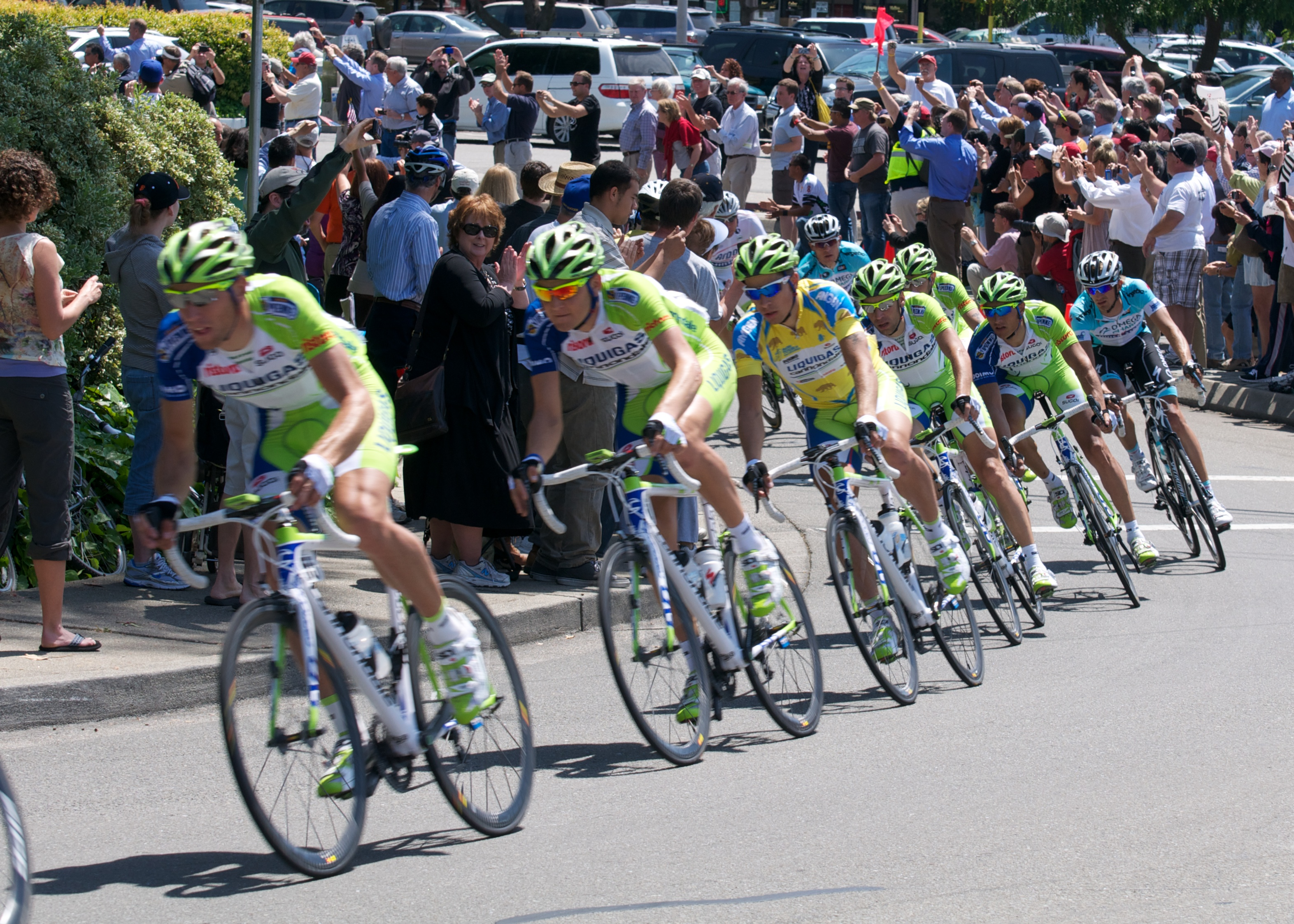
- The team at the 2012 Tour of California

Team information
- UCI code: CAN
- Registered: Italy
- Founded: 2005
- Disbanded: 2014 (Merged with Garmin–Sharp)
- Discipline: Road
- Status: UCI ProTeam
- Bicycles: Cannondale
- Website: Team home page

Key personnel
- General manager: Roberto Amadio

Team name history
- 2005 2006–2009 2010 2011–2012 2013–2014: Liquigas–Bianchi (LIQ); Liquigas (LIQ); Liquigas–Doimo (LIQ); Liquigas–Cannondale (LIQ); Cannondale (CAN)

Cannondale Pro Cycling Team (UCI team code: CAN), previously known as Liquigas, was an Italian professional road bicycle racing team in the UCI ProTour.

== History ==
The team was formed at the start of the UCI ProTour in 2005. the team was co-title sponsored by Italian companies Liquigas and Bianchi, therefore it was named Liquigas–Bianchi. It featured a number of big names including Italian riders Mario Cipollini, Danilo Di Luca and Stefano Garzelli, as well as Magnus Bäckstedt.

In 2007, Cannondale replaced Bianchi as the bicycle sponsor. This marked Cannondale's return to the ProTour after discontinuing sponsorship of the Lampre–Caffita team at the end of the 2005 season. Being an American company, their sponsorship led to a small American ridership on the team.

On 11 July 2008 the news broke from the French sports paper L'Équipe that Spanish rider Manuel Beltrán had tested positive for EPO after the first stage of the tour. It was blood abnormalities before the start of the tour that led France's Anti-Doping Agency to target the rider. According to AP a spokesperson for Liquigas confirmed the same day that Beltrán had been thrown off the tour. It was also reported that the police had picked Beltrán up from his hotel where he had been staying with the rest of the Liquigas team, as well as searching the rest of the hotel for more doping. It was later confirmed that his B-sample also tested positive.

From the 2009 Giro d'Italia until the 2012 Tour de France, the team finished every Grand Tour with all nine riders, a total of 11 such events in succession.

For the 2013 season Liquigas-Cannondale became Cannondale Pro Cycling as Cannondale Bicycle Corporation took over as the title sponsor in partnership with Brixia Sports. In August 2014 the team announced their intention to merge with EF Education–EasyPost for the 2015 season.

== Last team roster (in 2014) ==
As of 1 January 2014.

Rider	Date of birth
Ivan Basso (ITA)	26 November 1977 (aged 36)
George Bennett (NZL)	7 April 1990 (aged 23)
Alberto Bettiol (ITA)	29 October 1993 (aged 20)
Maciej Bodnar (POL)	7 March 1985 (aged 28)
Guillaume Boivin (CAN)	25 September 1989 (aged 24)
Damiano Caruso (ITA)	12 October 1987 (aged 26)
Alessandro De Marchi (ITA)	19 May 1986 (aged 27)
Davide Formolo (ITA)	24 October 1992 (aged 21)
Oscar Gatto (ITA)	1 January 1985 (aged 29)
Ted King (USA)	31 January 1983 (aged 30)
Michel Koch (GER)	15 October 1991 (aged 22)
Kristijan Koren (SLO)	25 November 1986 (aged 27)
Matthias Krizek (AUT)	29 September 1988 (aged 25)
Paolo Longo Borghini (ITA)	10 December 1980 (aged 33)

Rider	Date of birth
Alan Marangoni (ITA)	16 July 1984 (aged 29)
Marco Marcato (ITA)	11 February 1984 (aged 29)
Jean-Marc Marino (FRA)	15 August 1983 (aged 30)
Matej Mohorič (SLO)	19 October 1994 (aged 19)
Moreno Moser (ITA)	25 December 1990 (aged 23)
Daniele Ratto (ITA)	5 October 1989 (aged 24)
Fabio Sabatini (ITA)	18 February 1985 (aged 28)
Juraj Sagan (SVK)	23 December 1988 (aged 25)
Peter Sagan (SVK)	26 January 1990 (aged 23)
Cristiano Salerno (ITA)	18 February 1985 (aged 28)
Cayetano Sarmiento (COL)	28 March 1987 (aged 26)
Davide Villella (ITA)	27 June 1991 (aged 22)
Elia Viviani (ITA)	7 February 1989 (aged 24)
Cameron Wurf (AUS)	3 August 1983 (aged 30)

== Major wins ==
2005
Stage 4 Tour of Qatar, Mario Cipollini
Giro della Provincia di Lucca, Mario Cipollini
Overall Settimana Internazionale di Coppi e Bartali, Franco Pellizotti

Stage 2, Franco Pellizotti

Overall Tour of the Basque Country, Danilo di Luca

Stage 1, Danilo Di Luca

Amstel Gold Race, Danilo Di Luca
Flèche Wallonne, Danilo Di Luca
Stages 3 & 5 Giro d'Italia, Danilo Di Luca
Stage 2 Volta a Catalunya, Enrico Gasparotto
Stage 5 Tour de Suisse, Michael Albasini
Italy Road Race Championships, Enrico Gasparotto
Tre Valli Varesine, Stefano Garzelli
Overall Circuit Franco-Belge, Marco Zanotti

Stage 4, Marco Zanotti

2006
Stage 2 Settimana Internazionale di Coppi e Bartali, Vincenzo Nibali
Rund um den Henninger Turm, Stefano Garzelli
Stage 10 Giro d'Italia, Franco Pellizotti
Stage 6 Volta a Catalunya, Matej Mugerli
Stage 4 Tour de Luxembourg, Stefano Garzelli
Gran Premio Città di Camaiore, Luca Paolini
Tre Valli Varesine, Stefano Garzelli
Stage 2 Eneco Tour, Manuel Quinziato
GP Ouest-France, Vincenzo Nibali
Stage 5 Vuelta a España, Danilo Di Luca
Stage 12 Vuelta a España, Luca Paolini
Trofeo Melinda, Stefano Garzelli
Memorial Cimurri, Enrico Gasparotto
2007
Tour du Haut Var, Filippo Pozzato
Omloop Het Volk, Filippo Pozzato
Milano–Torino, Danilo Di Luca
Stage 2 Paris–Nice, Franco Pellizotti
Stage 3 Settimana Internazionale di Coppi e Bartali, Danilo Di Luca
Stage 1 Driedaagse van De Panne, Luca Paolini
Stage 1 Settimana Lombarda, Team Time Trial
Stage 2 Settimana Lombarda, Roman Kreuziger
Stage 5 Settimana Lombarda, Alessandro Vanotti
Stage 2 Tour of the Basque Country, Manuel Beltrán
Stage 4 Circuit de la Sarthe, Michael Albasini
Liège–Bastogne–Liège, Danilo Di Luca
GP Industria & Artigianato di Larciano, Vincenzo Nibali
Giro di Toscana, Vincenzo Nibali
Overall Giro d'Italia, Danilo Di Luca

Stage 1, Team Time Trial
Stages 4 & 12, Danilo Di Luca

Memorial Marco Pantani, Franco Pellizotti
Stages 3 & 4 Tour of Slovenia, Vincenzo Nibali
Sweden Road Race Championships, Magnus Bäckstedt
Stage 5 Tour de France, Filippo Pozzato
Stage 4 Brixia Tour, Francesco Chicchi
Stages 1 & 4 Danmark Rundt, Francesco Chicchi
Clásica de San Sebastián, Leonardo Bertagnolli
Trofeo Matteotti, Filippo Pozzato
Stage 5 Tour de Pologne, Murilo Fischer
Stage 6 Tour de Pologne, Filippo Pozzato
Gran Premio Industria e Commercio di Prato, Filippo Pozzato
Memorial Cimurri, Leonardo Bertagnolli
2008
World's View Challenge 1 & 5, Manuel Quinziato
World's View Challenge 2, Leonardo Bertagnolli
Overall Giro della Provincia di Grosseto, Filippo Pozzato

Stage 1, Filippo Pozzato

Stage 3 Paris–Nice, Kjell Carlström
Stage 7 Tirreno–Adriatico, Francesco Chicchi
Stages 1a & 4 Settimana Internazionale di Coppi e Bartali – Francesco Chicchi
Stage 1b Settimana Internazionale di Coppi e Bartali, Team Time Trial
Overall Giro del Trentino, Vincenzo Nibali

Stage 3, Vincenzo Nibali

Stage 5 Tour de Romandie, Daniele Bennati
Stages 3, 9 & 12 Giro d'Italia, Daniele Bennati
Stage 16 Giro d'Italia, Franco Pellizotti
Points classification in the Giro d'Italia, Daniele Bennati
Stage 6 Volta a Catalunya, Francesco Chicchi
Stage 3 Tour de Luxembourg, Michael Albasini
Stage 4 Tour of Slovenia, Francesco Chicchi
Overall Tour de Suisse, Roman Kreuziger

Stage 8, Roman Kreuziger

Gran Premio Città di Camaiore, Leonardo Bertagnolli
Stage 3 Eneco Tour, Daniele Bennati
Trofeo Melinda, Leonardo Bertagnolli
Stage 1 Vuelta a España, Team Time Trial
Stage 4 Vuelta a España, Daniele Bennati
Stage 3 Deutschland Tour, Leonardo Bertagnolli
Stage 7 Tour of Missouri, Francesco Chicchi
Giro del Piemonte, Daniele Bennati
2009
Stage 6 2009 Tour Down Under, Francesco Chicchi
Trofeo Inca, Daniele Bennati
Stage 1 Giro della Provincia di Grosseto, Daniele Bennati
Overall Giro di Sardegna, Daniele Bennati

Stage 4, Daniele Bennati

Overall Driedaagse van De Panne, Frederik Willems
Overall Giro del Trentino, Ivan Basso
Overall Tour de Romandie, Roman Kreuziger

Stage 4, Roman Kreuziger

~~Stages 10 & 17 Giro d'Italia, Franco Pellizotti~~ (Note: Pellizotti's results were voided due irregular blood values)
Stage 5 Critérium du Dauphiné Libéré, Sylwester Szmyd
Giro dell'Appennino, Vincenzo Nibali
Poland Time Trial Championships, Maciej Bodnar
Finland Road Race Championships, Kjell Carlström
~~Mountains classification in the Tour de France, Franco Pellizotti~~ (Note: As above)
Stage 3 Tour de Pologne, Jacopo Guarnieri
Gran Premio Città di Camaiore, Vincenzo Nibali
Giro della Romagna, Murilo Fischer
Stage 6 Tour of Missouri, Francesco Chicchi
2010
Overall Tour de San Luis, Vincenzo Nibali

Stage 1, Francesco Chicchi
Stage 4, Vincenzo Nibali

Stages 4 & 6 Tour of Qatar, Francesco Chicchi
Stage 2 Tour of Oman, Daniele Bennati
Overall Giro di Sardegna, Roman Kreuziger

Stage 2, Roman Kreuziger

Stages 3 & 5 Paris–Nice, Peter Sagan
Stage 3 Tirreno–Adriatico, Daniele Bennati
Overall Settimana Internazionale di Coppi e Bartali, Ivan Santaromita

Stage 1a, Francesco Chicchi
Stage 1b, Team Time Trial

Stage 7 Presidential Cycling Tour of Turkey, Elia Viviani
Giro dell'Appennino, Robert Kišerlovski
Stage 1 Tour de Romandie, Peter Sagan
Stage 4 Tour of California, Francesco Chicchi
Stages 5 & 6 Tour of California, Peter Sagan
Overall Giro d'Italia, Ivan Basso

Stage 4, Team Time Trial
Stage 14, Vincenzo Nibali
Stage 15, Ivan Basso

Overall Tour of Slovenia, Vincenzo Nibali

Stage 3, Vincenzo Nibali
Stage 4, Francesco Chicchi

Belarus Road Race Championships, Aleksandr Kuschynski
Stage 1 Tour de Pologne, Jacopo Guarnieri
Gran Premio Industria e Commercio Artigianato Carnaghese, Ivan Basso
Gran Premio Città di Camaiore, Kristjan Koren
Trofeo Melinda, Vincenzo Nibali
Giro del Veneto, Daniel Oss
GP Città di Modena, Francesco Chicchi
Overall Vuelta a España, Vincenzo Nibali
Memorial Marco Pantani, Elia Viviani
Giro di Toscana, Daniele Bennati
Stage 2 Circuit Franco-Belge, Jacopo Guarnieri
Binche–Tournai–Binche, Elia Viviani
2011
Gran Premio della Costa Etruschi, Elia Viviani
Tour de Mumbai I, Elia Viviani
Overall Giro di Sardegna, Peter Sagan

Stages 1, 3 & 4, Peter Sagan

Gran Premio di Lugano, Ivan Basso
Stage 3a Driedaagse van de Panne, Jacopo Guarnieri
Stage 5 Tour of California, Peter Sagan
Stage 16 Giro d'Italia, Vincenzo Nibali
Stage 18 Giro d'Italia, Eros Capecchi
Stages 3 & 8 Tour de Suisse, Peter Sagan
Stage 1 Tour of Slovenia, Elia Viviani
Slovakia Road Race Championships, Peter Sagan
GP Kranj, Simone Ponzi
Gran Premio Nobili Rubinetterie – Coppa Città di Stresa, Elia Viviani
Gran Premio Nobili Rubinetterie – Coppa Papà Carlo, Simone Ponzi
Overall Tour de Pologne, Peter Sagan

Stages 4 & 5, Peter Sagan

Stages 6, 12 & 21 Vuelta a España, Peter Sagan
Stages 4 & 5 USA Pro Cycling Challenge, Elia Viviani
Stage 6 USA Pro Cycling Challenge, Daniel Oss
Overall Giro di Padania, Ivan Basso

Stage 2, Elia Viviani
Stage 4, Ivan Basso

Gran Premio Industria e Commercio di Prato, Peter Sagan
Stage 4 Tour of Beijing, Elia Viviani
2012
Slovakia Road Race Championships, Peter Sagan
United States Road Race Championships, Timmy Duggan
Poland Time Trial Championships, Maciej Bodnar
Stage 6 Tour de San Luis, Elia Viviani
Gran Premio della Costa Etruschi, Elia Viviani
Overall Giro della Provincia di Reggio Calabria, Elia Viviani

Stages 1 & 2, Elia Viviani

Stage 2 Tour of Oman, Peter Sagan
Stage 5 Tour of Oman, Vincenzo Nibali
Trofeo Laigueglia, Moreno Moser
Gran Premio di Lugano, Eros Capecchi
Overall Tirreno–Adriatico, Vincenzo Nibali

Stage 4, Peter Sagan
Stage 5, Vincenzo Nibali

Stage 2a Settimana internazionale di Coppi e Bartali, Elia Viviani
Stage 1 Three Days of De Panne, Peter Sagan
Eschborn–Frankfurt City Loop, Moreno Moser
Stages 1, 2, 3, 4 & 8 Tour of California, Peter Sagan
Stages 1 (ITT), 3, 4 & 6 Tour de Suisse, Peter Sagan
Stage 4 (ITT) Tour of Slovenia, Kristijan Koren
Points classification in the Tour de France, Peter Sagan
Stages 1, 3 & 6 Tour de France, Peter Sagan
Overall Tour de Pologne, Moreno Moser

Stages 1 & 6, Moreno Moser

Overall Giro di Padania, Vincenzo Nibali

Stage 4, Vincenzo Nibali

Stage 1 Tour of Beijing, Elia Viviani
Japan Cup, Ivan Basso
2013
Stages 2 & 3 Tour of Oman, Peter Sagan
Gran Premio Città di Camaiore, Peter Sagan
Strade Bianche, Moreno Moser
Stages 3 & 6 Tirreno–Adriatico, Peter Sagan
Stage 5 Settimana Internazionale di Coppi e Bartali, Damiano Caruso
Gent–Wevelgem, Peter Sagan
Stage 1 Three Days of De Panne, Peter Sagan
Brabantse Pijl, Peter Sagan
Stages 3 & 8 Tour of California, Peter Sagan
Stage 2 Critérium du Dauphiné, Elia Viviani
Stage 8 Critérium du Dauphiné, Alessandro De Marchi
Stages 3 & 8 Tour de Suisse, Peter Sagan
Poland Time Trial Championships, Maciej Bodnar
Denmark Time Trial Championships, Brian Vandborg
Slovakia Road Race Championships, Peter Sagan
Stage 7 Tour de France, Peter Sagan
Points classification in the Tour de France, Peter Sagan
Overall Tour of Elk Grove, Elia Viviani

Stages 2 & 3, Elia Viviani

Stages 1, 3, 6 & 7 USA Pro Cycling Challenge, Peter Sagan
Dutch Food Valley Classic, Elia Viviani
Prologue, Stages 1 & 5 Tour of Alberta, Peter Sagan
Stage 14 Vuelta a España, Daniele Ratto
Stage 1 Tour of Britain, Elia Viviani
Grand Prix Cycliste de Montréal, Peter Sagan
2014
Stage 4 Tour of Oman, Peter Sagan
Stage 3 Tirreno–Adriatico, Peter Sagan
E3 Harelbeke, Peter Sagan
Stage 3 Settimana Internazionale di Coppi e Bartali, Elia Viviani
Stage 1 Three Days of De Panne, Peter Sagan
Stage 3b (ITT) Three Days of De Panne, Maciej Bodnar
Stages 5 & 7 Tour of Turkey, Elia Viviani
Stage 7 Tour of California, Peter Sagan
Stage 3 Tour de Suisse, Peter Sagan
Stage 4 Tour of Slovenia, Elia Viviani
Slovakia Road Race Championships, Peter Sagan
Stages 2 & 4 Tour of Austria, Oscar Gatto
Points classification in the Tour de France, Peter Sagan
Overall Combativity award Tour de France, Alessandro De Marchi
Stage 4 USA Pro Cycling Challenge, Elia Viviani
Stage 7 Vuelta a España, Alessandro De Marchi
Coppa Bernocchi, Elia Viviani

== Supplementary statistics ==
Grand Tours by highest finishing position
Race	2005	2006	2007	2008	2009	2010	2011	2012	2013	2014
Giro d'Italia	4	8	1	4	3	1	2	5	19	15
Tour de France	32	54	18	12	6	8	7	3	71	52
/Vuelta a España	41	38	9	75	4	1	7	25	54	9
Major week-long stage races by highest finishing position
Race	2005	2006	2007	2008	2009	2010	2011	2012	2013	2014
Tour Down Under	–	12	–	7	22	25	18	49	27	20
Paris–Nice	6	66	5	23	41	3	38	25	47	14
/Tirreno–Adriatico	25	16	17	7	5	8	4	1	19	24
Volta a Catalunya	94	18	38	62	15	8	6	13	18	32
Tour of the Basque Country	1	19	16	31	9	16	36	32	24	35
Tour de Romandie	15	6	6	2	1	12	30	7	25	41
Critérium du Dauphiné	DNF (Note: None of their riders finished the final stage.)	68	8	15	7	10	26	28	24	51
Tour de Suisse	24	27	32	1	3	13	50	41	26	7
Tour de Pologne	5	8	8	3	7	6	1	1	8	16
/ Eneco Tour	49	3	15	13	45	14	25	21	26	10
Monument races by highest finishing position
Race	2005	2006	2007	2008	2009	2010	2011	2012	2013	2014
Milan–San Remo	9	3	12	2	6	5	8	3	2	10
Tour of Flanders	20	32	3	6	18	28	122 (Note: Kristijan Koren originally placed 95th but his results have since been removed due to doping.)	5	2	16
Paris–Roubaix	4	34	5	13	9	23	77	60	32	6
Liège–Bastogne–Liège	26	9	1	10	39	27	8	2	25	71
Giro di Lombardia	34	9	19	17	12	5	4	26	11	15
Classics by highest finishing position
Classic	2005	2006	2007	2008	2009	2010	2011	2012	2013	2014
Omloop Het Nieuwsblad	–	39	1	5	57	25	–	–	–	–
Kuurne–Brussels–Kuurne	–	42	15	5	–	DNF	–	–	NH	–
Strade Bianche	Did not exist		13	14	11	12	25	15	1	2
E3 Harelbeke	–	7	4	36	47	–	–	14	2	1
Gent–Wevelgem	12	86	19	13	2	5	14	2	1	3
Amstel Gold Race	1	35	3	16	18	5	92 (Note: Kristijan Koren originally placed 32nd but his results have since been removed due to doping.)	3	36	31
La Flèche Wallonne	1	6	3	7	31	12	44	8	12	32
Clásica de San Sebastián	4	2	16 (Note: Leonardo Bertagnolli originally placed 1st but his results have since been removed due to doping.)	5	1 (Note: Carlos Barredo of Quick-Step originally placed 1st but his results have since been removed due to doping.)	32	11	17	7	22
Paris–Tours	10	30	2	8	–	42	–	–	–	–

Legend
—	Did not compete
DNF	Did not finish
NH	Not held

== World and national champions ==
2000
World Time Trial Serhiy Honchar
2001
Ukrainian Time Trial Serhiy Honchar
2005
Italian Road Race Enrico Gasparotto
2007
Swedish Road Race Magnus Bäckstedt
2009
Polish Time Trial Maciej Bodnar
Finnish Road Race Kjell Carlström
2010
Belarusian Road Race Aleksandr Kuschynski
2011
Slovak Road Race Peter Sagan
2012
Slovak Road Race Peter Sagan
United States Road Race Timmy Duggan
Polish Time Trial Maciej Bodnar
2013
Polish Time Trial Maciej Bodnar
Danish Time Trial Brian Vandborg
Slovak Road Race Peter Sagan
2014
Slovak Road Race Peter Sagan
