= 2007 Tour du Haut Var =

Race details
- Dates: 25 February 2007
- Stages: 1
- Distance: 200.1 km (124.3 mi)
- Winning time: 5h 08' 31"

Results
	Winner	Filippo Pozzato (ITA)
	Second	Simon Gerrans (AUS)
	Third	Ricardo Serrano (ESP)

The 2007 Tour du Haut Var was the 39th edition of the Tour du Haut Var cycle race and was held on 25 February 2007. The race started and finished in Draguignan. The race was won by Filippo Pozzato.

== General classification ==
Final general classification

Rank	Rider	Time
1	Filippo Pozzato (ITA)	5h 08' 31"
2	Simon Gerrans (AUS)	+ 0"
3	Ricardo Serrano (ESP)	+ 0"
4	Francesco Reda (ITA)	+ 0"
5	Mikhail Ignatiev (RUS)	+ 0"
6	Pierrick Fédrigo (FRA)	+ 0"
7	Aleksandr Kuschynski (BLR)	+ 3"
8	Vasil Kiryienka (BLR)	+ 3"
9	Andrei Kunitski (BLR)	+ 6"
10	Frédéric Amorison (BEL)	+ 13"
