= 2005 GP Ouest-France =

Race details
- Dates: 28 August 2005
- Stages: 1
- Distance: 211.5 km (131.4 mi)
- Winning time: 4h 59' 42"

Results
	Winner	George Hincapie (USA)	(Discovery Channel)
	Second	Alexandre Usov (BLR)	(AG2R Prévoyance)
	Third	Davide Rebellin (ITA)	(Gerolsteiner)

The 2005 GP Ouest-France was the 69th edition of the GP Ouest-France cycle race and was held on 28 August 2005. The race started and finished in Plouay. These are the results, in which American George Hincapie edged out AG2R's Alexandre Usov.

== General Standings ==
Final general classification

Rank	Rider	Team	Time
1	George Hincapie (USA)	Discovery Channel	4h 59' 42"
2	Alexandre Usov (BLR)	AG2R Prévoyance	s.t.
3	Davide Rebellin (ITA)	Gerolsteiner	s.t.
4	Daniele Bennati (ITA)	Lampre–Caffita	s.t.
5	Peter Wrolich (AUT)	Gerolsteiner	s.t.
6	Markus Zberg (SUI)	Gerolsteiner	s.t.
7	Cristian Moreni (ITA)	Quick-Step–Innergetic	s.t.
8	Luca Paolini (ITA)	Quick-Step–Innergetic	s.t.
9	Kurt Asle Arvesen (NOR)	Team CSC	s.t.
10	Jan Ullrich (GER)	T-Mobile Team	s.t.
