= 2003 Tirreno–Adriatico =

Race details
- Dates: 13–19 March 2003
- Stages: 7
- Distance: 1,088 km (676.1 mi)
- Winning time: 29h 45' 22"

Results
Jersey awarded to the overall winner	Winner	Filippo Pozzato (ITA)	(Fassa Bortolo)
	Second	Danilo Di Luca (ITA)	(Saeco)
	Third	Ruggero Marzoli (ITA)	(Alessio)
	Points	Paolo Bettini (ITA)	(Quick-Step–Davitamon)
	Mountains	Elio Aggiano (ITA)	(Formaggi Pinzolo Fiavè)

The 2003 Tirreno–Adriatico was the 38th edition of the Tirreno–Adriatico cycle race and was held from 13 March to 19 March 2003. The race started in Sabaudia and finished in San Benedetto del Tronto. The race was won by Filippo Pozzato of the Fassa Bortolo team.

== Teams ==
Twenty teams, containing a total of 160 riders, participated in the race:

- Domina Vacanze–Elitron
- Alessio
- Ceramiche Panaria–Fiordo
- Cofidis
- De Nardi–Colpack
- Fassa Bortolo
- Formaggi Pinzolo Fiavè
- Gerolsteiner
- iBanesto.com
- Landbouwkrediet–Colnago
- Lampre
- Lotto–Domo
- ONCE–Eroski
- Phonak
- Quick-Step–Davitamon
- Rabobank
- Saeco
- Vini Caldirola–So.di
- Team CSC
- Team Telekom

== Route ==
Stage characteristics and winners
Stage	Date	Course	Distance	Type	Winner
1	13 March	Sabaudia to Sabaudia	178 km (111 mi)	Flat stage	Mario Cipollini (ITA)
2	14 March	Sabaudia to Tarquinia	213 km (132 mi)	Flat stage	Filippo Pozzato (ITA)
3	15 March	Tarquinia to Foligno	168 km (104 mi)	Hilly stage	Mario Cipollini (ITA)
4	16 March	Foligno to Ortezzano	154 km (96 mi)	Hilly stage	Stage cancelled
5	17 March	Monte San Giusto to Rapagnano	181 km (112 mi)	Hilly stage	Ruggero Marzoli (ITA)
6	18 March	Teramo to Torricella Peligna	179 km (111 mi)	Medium mountain stage	Danilo Di Luca (ITA)
7	19 March	San Benedetto del Tronto to San Benedetto del Tronto	162 km (101 mi)	Hilly stage	Óscar Freire (ESP)

== General classification ==
Final general classification

Rank	Rider	Team	Time
1	Filippo Pozzato (ITA)	Fassa Bortolo	29h 45' 22"
2	Danilo Di Luca (ITA)	Saeco	+ 4"
3	Ruggero Marzoli (ITA)	Alessio	+ 12"
4	Michael Boogerd (NED)	Rabobank	+ 13"
5	Paolo Bettini (ITA)	Quick-Step–Davitamon	+ 21"
6	Markus Zberg (SUI)	Gerolsteiner	+ 21"
7	Andreas Klöden (GER)	Team Telekom	+ 22"
8	Erik Zabel (GER)	Team Telekom	+ 23"
9	Luca Paolini (ITA)	Quick-Step–Davitamon	+ 27"
10	Andrea Noè (ITA)	Alessio	+ 33"
