= Danilo Napolitano =

Italian cyclist

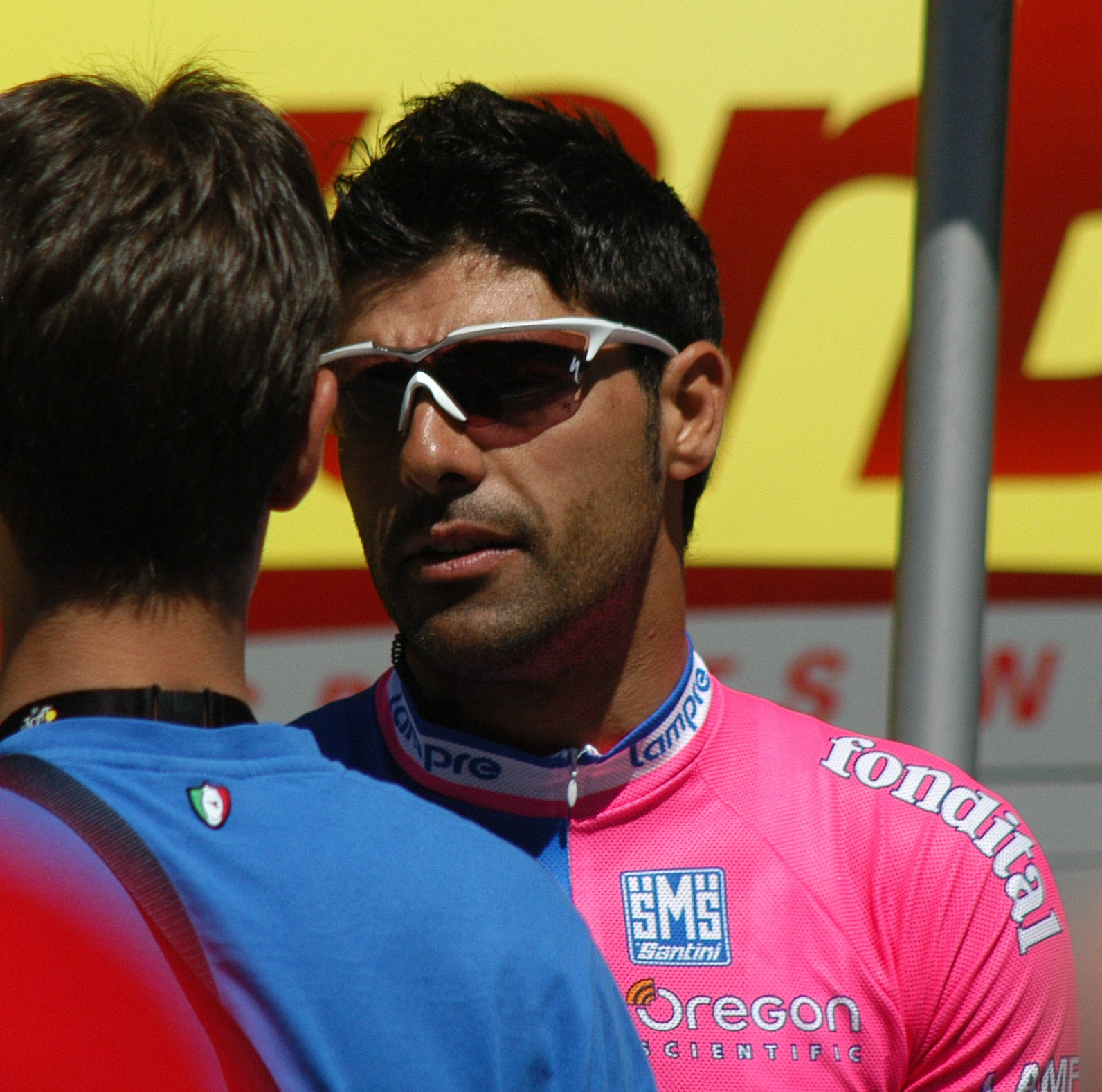
- Napolitano at the 2007 Tour de France

Personal information
- Full name: Danilo Napolitano
- Born: 31 January 1981 (age 45) Vittoria, Italy
- Height: 1.74 m (5 ft 9 in)
- Weight: 81 kg (179 lb)

Cycling career
- Sport: Cycling
- Discipline: Road
- Role: Rider
- Rider type: Sprinter

Professional teams
- 2004–2005: LPR–Piacenza
- 2006–2008: Lampre–Fondital
- 2009–2010: Team Katusha
- 2011–2012: Acqua & Sapone
- 2013–2017: Accent Jobs–Wanty

Major wins
- Grand Tours Giro d'Italia 1 individual stage (2007)

Danilo Napolitano (born 31 January 1981) is an Italian former professional road racing cyclist, who rode professionally between 2004 and 2017, and was chiefly known for his sprinting abilities.

Born in Vittoria, Sicily, Napolitano turned professional in 2004 and for the 2004 and 2005 seasons he rode for the professional continental team LPR–Piacenza. For the 2006 season he moved on to the UCI ProTour squad Lampre–Fondital, where his most important victories were two stage wins in the Tour of Austria, and a stage win in the Tour Méditerranéen. He joined Team Katusha at the beginning of the 2009 season.

== Suspension ==
Napolitano was suspended in April 2026 by Italy's National Anti-Doping Prosecutor and later found guilty of violations of the World Anti-Doping Code. While he faced a potential lifetime ban due to the involvement of a minor, he has been suspended for 20 years.

== Major results ==
2002
4th Circuito del Porto
9th Trofeo Papà Cervi
2003
1st Trofeo Papà Cervi
1st Stage 1 Vuelta a Guatemala
4th Circuito del Porto
2004
1st Stage 6 Vuelta por un Chile Líder
2nd Trofeo Papà Cervi
2nd Circuito del Porto
2005
1st Stausee-Rundfahrt Klingnau
1st Coppa Bernocchi
1st Giro della Romagna
Tour du Poitou-Charentes et de la Vienne

1st Stages 2 & 5

1st Stage 3 Settimana Internazionale di Coppi e Bartali
1st Stage 3 Brixia Tour
2nd Châteauroux Classic
3rd Giro del Lago Maggiore
2006
1st Coppa Bernocchi
Settimana Internazionale di Coppi e Bartali

1st Stages 1a & 4

Tour of Austria

1st Points classification
1st Stages 1 & 5

1st Stage 1 Tour Méditerranéen
1st Stage 3a Brixia Tour
3rd Gran Premio della Costa Etruschi
5th Milan–San Remo
8th Paris–Tours
9th Vattenfall Cyclassics
2007
1st Coppa Bernocchi
1st Gran Premio Città di Misano – Adriatico
Tour de Pologne

1st Stages 1 (TTT) & 4

1st Stage 9 Giro d'Italia
1st Stage 5 Vuelta a Murcia
1st Stage 1 Tour of Slovenia
4th Vattenfall Cyclassics
5th Clásica de Almería
2008
Volta a Portugal

1st Stages 1 & 2

1st Stage 5 Tour of Qatar
1st Stage 3 Giro della Provincia di Grosseto
1st Stage 5 Volta a la Comunitat Valenciana
1st Stage 1a Brixia Tour
3rd Gran Premio della Costa Etruschi
2009
1st Stage 1 Vuelta a Andalucía
1st Stage 2 Driedaagse van West-Vlaanderen
1st Stage 1a Settimana Internazionale di Coppi e Bartali
1st Stage 1 Tour de Luxembourg
4th Overall Tour de Picardie
4th Nationale Sluitingsprijs
7th Overall Circuit Franco-Belge
2010
1st Stage 2 Four Days of Dunkirk
1st Stage 1 Tour de Wallonie
6th Overall Tour of Qatar
2011
2nd Gran Premio Nobili Rubinetterie
3rd Overall Ronde van Drenthe
6th Grand Prix de Denain
9th Gran Premio della Costa Etruschi
2012
Tour de Wallonie

1st Points classification
1st Stages 2, 4 & 5

1st Stage 4 Circuit de Lorraine
9th Gran Premio della Costa Etruschi
2013
1st Stage 1 Driedaagse van West-Vlaanderen
2nd Dutch Food Valley Classic
8th Grand Prix de Denain
8th Halle–Ingooigem
2014
1st Omloop van het Waasland
1st Points classification Driedaagse van West-Vlaanderen
3rd Gran Premio Industria e Commercio di Prato
6th Handzame Classic
7th Le Samyn
7th Scheldeprijs
7th Grand Prix Pino Cerami
2015
1st Stage 3 Boucles de la Mayenne
2nd Overall World Ports Classic
2016
7th Gran Premio Bruno Beghelli
2017
4th Dorpenomloop Rucphen
6th Ronde van Drenthe
