= 2006 Milan–San Remo =

2006 UCI ProTour, race 3 of 27

Race details
- Dates: March 18, 2006
- Stages: 1
- Distance: 294 km (183 mi)

Results
	Winner	Filippo Pozzato (ITA)	(Quick-Step–Innergetic)
	Second	Alessandro Petacchi (ITA)	(Team Milram)
	Third	Luca Paolini (ITA)	(Liquigas)

These are the results for the 97th edition of the Milan–San Remo cycling classic, raced on March 18, 2006. Filippo Pozzato, who was controlling a breakaway for teammate Tom Boonen, managed to steal the victory from the sprinters. It was less than 5 minutes off the record pace set in the 1990 Milan–San Remo.

== General Standings ==
=== 18-03-2006: Milan–San Remo, 294 km. ===
	Cyclist	Team	Time
1	Filippo Pozzato (ITA)	Quick-Step–Innergetic	6h 29' 41"
2	Alessandro Petacchi (ITA)	Team Milram	s.t.
3	Luca Paolini (ITA)	Liquigas	s.t.
4	Tom Boonen (BEL)	Quick-Step–Innergetic	s.t.
5	Danilo Napolitano (ITA)	Lampre–Fondital	s.t.
6	Óscar Freire (ESP)	Rabobank	s.t.
7	Stefano Garzelli (ITA)	Liquigas	s.t.
8	Alessandro Ballan (ITA)	Lampre–Fondital	s.t.
9	Martin Elmiger (SUI)	Phonak	s.t.
10	Matteo Carrara (ITA)	Lampre–Fondital	s.t.
