= Vasco Modena =

Italian cyclist

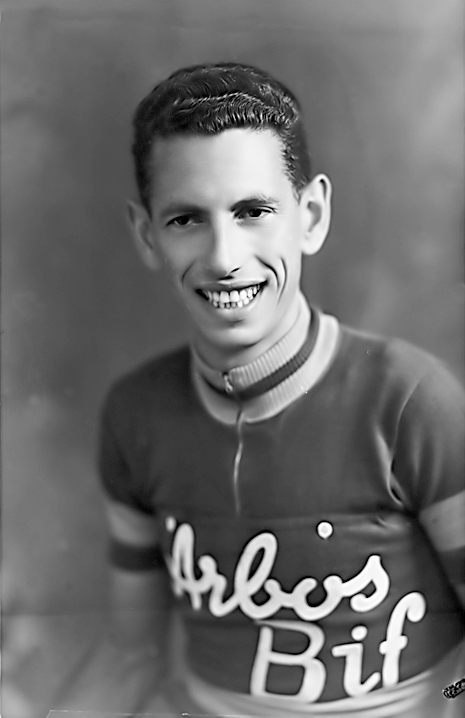

Personal information
- Full name: Velasco Modena
- Born: 17 July 1929 Mori, Italy
- Died: 7 August 2016 (aged 87) Trento, Italy

Cycling career
- Sport: Cycling
- Role: Rider

Professional teams
- 1956–1957: Arbos-Bif
- 1958: Calì Broni

Major wins
- Coppa Bernocchi (1956)

Velasco Modena (17 July 1929 – 7 August 2016), called Vasco, was an Italian professional racing cyclist. He won the Coppa Bernocchi in 1956. He rode in the 1957 Giro d'Italia.

== Biography ==
He made his debut in the amateurs in 1948, racing for the Società Sportiva Olivo of Arco, Italy. The following year he joined the U.S. Cofler of Rovereto, under the guidance of the former professional Giannino Piccolroaz, with whom he placed first in the La Bolghera, a spring classic. He won the Tridentino championship for three consecutive years from 1949 to 1951 and various local competitions, especially long uphill races. When he won the Coppa San Geo, Varese, in 1953 the transition to the pros became a real possibility. Unfortunately, a serious accident when he crashed with his bicycle into a bus, forced him into a long period of inactivity. It was only in 1955 that he returned to first place in two important amateur races (Trofeo Pizzolli, Bologna and Coppa Penne, Arezzo) and finally turned professional in 1956 in the Arbos-Bif team captained by Pasquale Fornara. After a few months he came to the fore by placing third in the Milano-Vignola. In his short career as a professional he made a special impression by winning the 1956 Coppa Bernocchi time trial in Legnano (108 km), mainly by setting a better time than Fausto Coppi. In 1957 he rode in the Giro di Sicilia, the Milano-Sanremo, and the Giro d'Italia. He retired from professional cycling in 1958 after participating in some northern classics in the Calì Broni team, captained by a young Aldo Moser.

Despite a short professional career, Modena left a lasting legacy as a symbol of determination and authenticity, refusing to pose for a staged victory photo after his Bernocchi win.
