= 2016 Gran Piemonte =

2016 UCI Europe Tour

Race details
- Dates: 29 September 2016
- Stages: 1
- Distance: 207 km (128.6 mi)
- Winning time: 4h 25' 21"

Results
	Winner	Giacomo Nizzolo (ITA)	(Italian selection)
	Second	Fernando Gaviria (COL)	(Etixx–Quick-Step)
	Third	Daniele Bennati (ITA)	(Tinkoff–Saxo)

The 100th edition of the Gran Piemonte one-day cycling classic race, also known as the Giro del Piemonte, was held on 20 September 2016, one day after Milano–Torino and two days before Il Lombardia, as part of the Trittico di Autunno. It covered a distance of 209 kilometres (130 mi), starting in Diano d'Alba and ending in Agliè. Italian Giacomo Nizzolo won the race in a bunch sprint before Fernando Gaviria and Daniele Bennati.

== Teams ==
Nineteen teams started the race. Each team had a maximum of eight riders:

UCI WorldTeams

- AG2R La Mondiale
- Etixx–Quick-Step
- Movistar Team
- Team Sky
- Astana
- BMC Racing Team
- Lampre–Merida
- Team Katusha
- Tinkoff
- Cannondale–Drapac

UCI Professional Continental teams

- Androni Giocattoli–Sidermec
- Caja Rural–Seguros RGA
- Cofidis
- Nippo–Vini Fantini
- Bardiani–CSF
- CCC–Sprandi–Polkowice
- Gazprom–RusVelo
- Wilier Triestina–Southeast

National team

- Italy

== Result ==
Final general classification

Rank	Rider	Team	Time
1	Giacomo Nizzolo (ITA)	Italy	4h 25' 21"
2	Fernando Gaviria (COL)	Etixx–Quick-Step	s.t.
3	Daniele Bennati (ITA)	Tinkoff	s.t.
4	Juan José Lobato (ESP)	Movistar Team	s.t.
5	Sonny Colbrelli (ITA)	Bardiani–CSF	s.t.
6	Philippe Gilbert (BEL)	BMC Racing Team	s.t.
7	Ben Swift (GBR)	Team Sky	s.t.
8	Zdeněk Štybar (CZE)	Etixx–Quick-Step	s.t.
9	Filippo Pozzato (ITA)	Wilier Triestina–Southeast	s.t.
10	Alberto Bettiol (ITA)	Cannondale–Drapac	s.t.
