= Memorial Cimurri =

Race details
- Date: Early October
- Region: Emilia Romagna, Italy
- Local name(s): Memorial Cimurri (in Italian)
- Discipline: Road
- Competition: UCI Europe Tour
- Type: Single-day
- Organiser: Gruppo Sportivo Emilia

History
- First edition: 2005
- Editions: 5
- Final edition: 2009
- First winner: Murilo Fischer (BRA)
- Final winner: Filippo Pozzato (ITA)

The Memorial Cimurri (also called Gran Premio Bioera) was a late season road bicycle race held annually near Reggio Emilia, in the region of Emilia Romagna, Italy. The race was organised as a 1.1 event on the UCI Europe Tour.

== Winners ==
Year	Country	Rider	Team
2005	Brazil	Murilo Fischer	Naturino-Sapore Di Mare
2006	Italy	Enrico Gasparotto	Liquigas
2007	Italy	Leonardo Bertagnolli	Liquigas
2008	Ukraine	Mikhaylo Khalilov	Ceramica Flaminia-Bossini Docce
2009	Italy	Filippo Pozzato	Team Katusha
