= Sandrigo =

- Comune
- Comune di Sandrigo
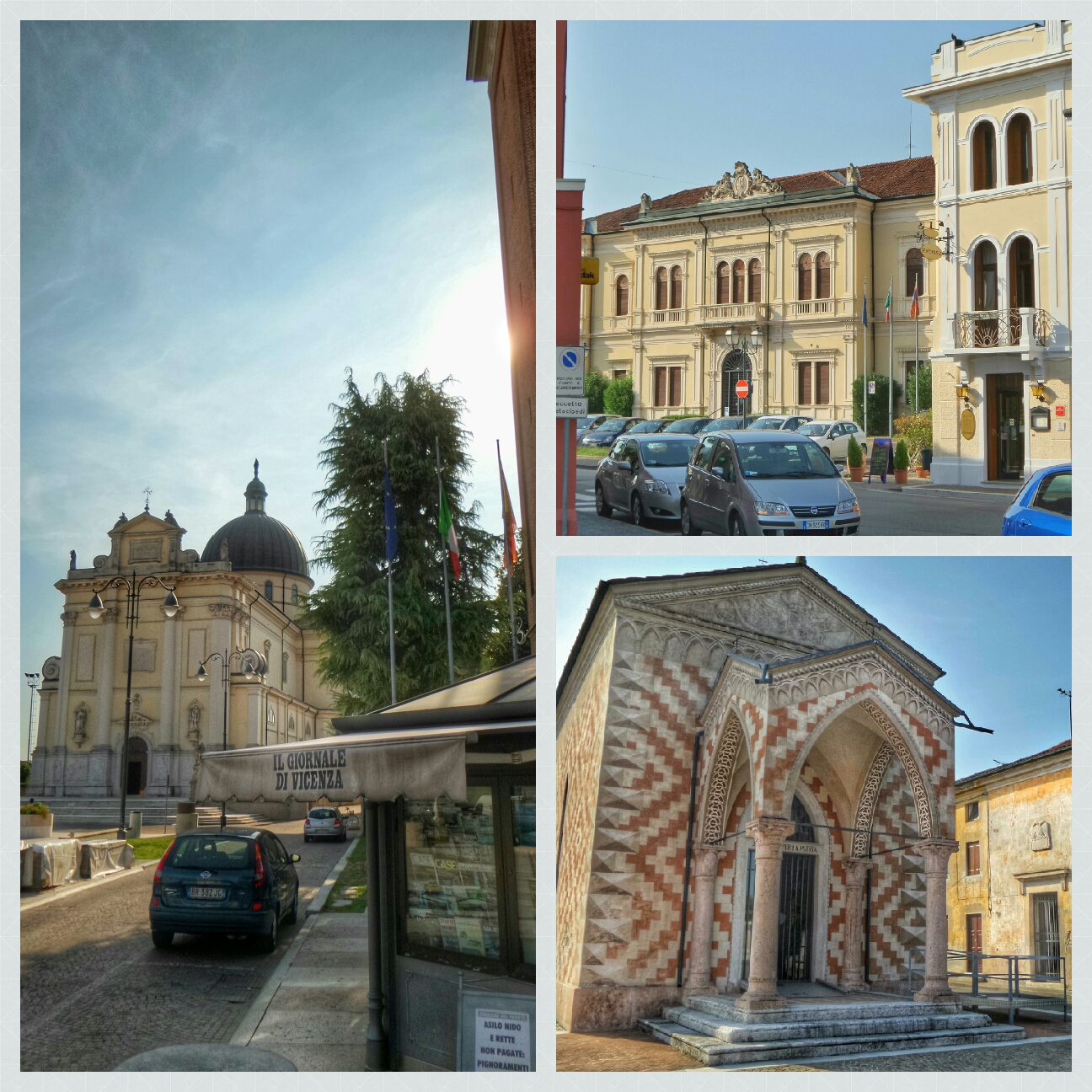

- Location within Italy Location within Veneto
- Coordinates: 45°40′N 11°36′E
- Country: Italy
- Region: Veneto
- Province: Vicenza (VI)
- Frazioni: Ancignano, Lupia

Government
  - Mayor: Giuliano Stivan

Area
  - Total: 27.99 km^{2} (10.81 sq mi)
- Elevation: 64 m (210 ft)

Population (31 December 2015)
  - Total: 8,453
  - Density: 302.0/km^{2} (782.2/sq mi)
- Demonym: Sandricensi
- Time zone: UTC+1 (CET)
  - Summer (DST): UTC+2 (CEST)
- Postal code: 36066
- Dialing code: 0444
- Patron saint: Santa Maria Assunta, San Filippo and San Giacomo
- Saint day: 15 August, 3 May
- Website: Official website

Sandrigo is a town in the province of Vicenza, Veneto, northern Italy. It is east of SP248 provincial road.

The town is home to the "Festa del Baccalà", where the typical dish baccalà alla vicentina is prepared with the stockfish imported from Røst Municipality in Lofoten, Norway.

== Twin towns ==
Sandrigo is twinned with:

- Røst, Norway
