= 2005 HEW Cyclassics =

Race details
- Dates: 31 July
- Stages: 1
- Distance: 250 km (160 mi)
- Winning time: 6h 00' 59"

Results
	Winner	Filippo Pozzato (ITA)	(Quick-Step–Innergetic)
	Second	Luca Paolini (ITA)	(Quick-Step–Innergetic)
	Third	Allan Davis (AUS)	(Liberty Seguros–Würth)

These are the results for the 2005 edition of the HEW Cyclassics cycling classic, held in Hamburg, Germany. Filippo Pozzato ensured that the tradition that nobody has won this race twice was maintained.

== General Standings ==
=== 31 July 2005: Hamburg, 250 km ===
	Cyclist	Team	Time
1	Filippo Pozzato (ITA)	Quick Step	6h 00' 59"
2	Luca Paolini (ITA)	Quick Step	s.t.
3	Allan Davis (AUS)	Liberty Seguros–Würth	s.t.
4	Fabian Cancellara (SUI)	Fassa Bortolo	s.t.
5	Davide Rebellin (ITA)	Gerolsteiner	s.t.
6	Martin Elmiger (SUI)	Phonak Hearing Systems	s.t.
7	Salvatore Commesso (ITA)	Lampre–Caffita	s.t.
8	Vladimir Gusev (RUS)	Team CSC	s.t.
9	Juan Antonio Flecha (ESP)	Fassa Bortolo	s.t.
10	Bert Grabsch (GER)	Phonak Hearing Systems	s.t.
