= 2009 E3 Prijs Vlaanderen =

Race details
- Dates: 28 March 2009
- Stages: 1
- Distance: 208 km (129 mi)
- Winning time: 5h 11' 49"

Results
	Winner	Filippo Pozzato (ITA)	(Team Katusha)
	Second	Tom Boonen (BEL)	(Quick-Step)
	Third	Maxim Iglinsky (KAZ)	(Astana)

The 2009 E3 Prijs Vlaanderen was the 52nd edition of the E3 Harelbeke cycle race and was held on 28 March 2009. The race started and finished in Harelbeke. The race was won by Filippo Pozzato of Team Katusha.

== General classification ==
Final general classification

Rank	Rider	Team	Time
1	Filippo Pozzato (ITA)	Team Katusha	5h 11' 49"
2	Tom Boonen (BEL)	Quick-Step	+ 0"
3	Maxim Iglinsky (KAZ)	Astana	+ 0"
4	Thor Hushovd (NOR)	Cervélo TestTeam	+ 45"
5	Sylvain Chavanel (FRA)	Quick-Step	+ 45"
6	Stijn Devolder (BEL)	Quick-Step	+ 45"
7	Nick Nuyens (BEL)	Team Columbia–High Road	+ 45"
8	George Hincapie (USA)	Rabobank	+ 45"
9	Sebastian Langeveld (NED)	Rabobank	+ 45"
10	Marcus Burghardt (GER)	Team Columbia–High Road	+ 1' 02"
