= 2006 Vattenfall Cyclassics =

Race details
- Dates: July 30
- Stages: 1
- Distance: 250.5 km (155.7 mi)
- Winning time: 5h 30' 03"

Results
	Winner	Óscar Freire (ESP)	(Rabobank)
	Second	Erik Zabel (GER)	(Team Milram)
	Third	Filippo Pozzato (ITA)	(Quick-Step–Innergetic)

The 2006 edition of the Vattenfall Cyclassics cycle race took place in the German city of Hamburg on July 30, 2006. The race was the continuation of the old HEW Cyclassics, which no rider has won twice.

== General Standings ==
=== 30-07-2006: Hamburg, 250.5 km. ===
Rank	Name	Team	Time
1	Óscar Freire (ESP)	Rabobank	5h 30' 03"
2	Erik Zabel (GER)	Team Milram	s.t.
3	Filippo Pozzato (ITA)	Quick-Step–Innergetic	s.t.
4	Nick Nuyens (BEL)	Quick-Step–Innergetic	s.t.
5	Gerald Ciolek (GER)	Team Wiesenhof-AKUD	s.t.
6	Grégory Rast (SUI)	Phonak Hearing Systems	s.t.
7	Samuel Dumoulin (FRA)	Ag2r Prévoyance	s.t.
8	Giuliano Figueras (ITA)	Lampre–Fondital	s.t.
9	Danilo Napolitano (ITA)	Lampre–Fondital	s.t.
10	Manuele Mori (ITA)	Saunier Duval–Prodir	s.t.
