= Coppa Bernocchi =

Italian one-day road cycling race

Race details
- Date: Mid-August
- Region: Lombardy, Italy
- English name: Bernocchi Cup
- Local name: Coppa Bernocchi (in Italian)
- Nickname: La Bernocchi
- Discipline: Road
- Competition: UCI ProSeries
- Type: Single-day
- Race director: Pino Cozzi
- Web site: www.uslegnanese.it/coppa-bernocchi/

History
- First edition: 1919
- Editions: 107 (as of 2026) *see below
- First winner: Ruggero Ferrario (ITA)
- Most wins: Danilo Napolitano (ITA) (3 wins)
- Most recent: Noa Isidore (FRA)

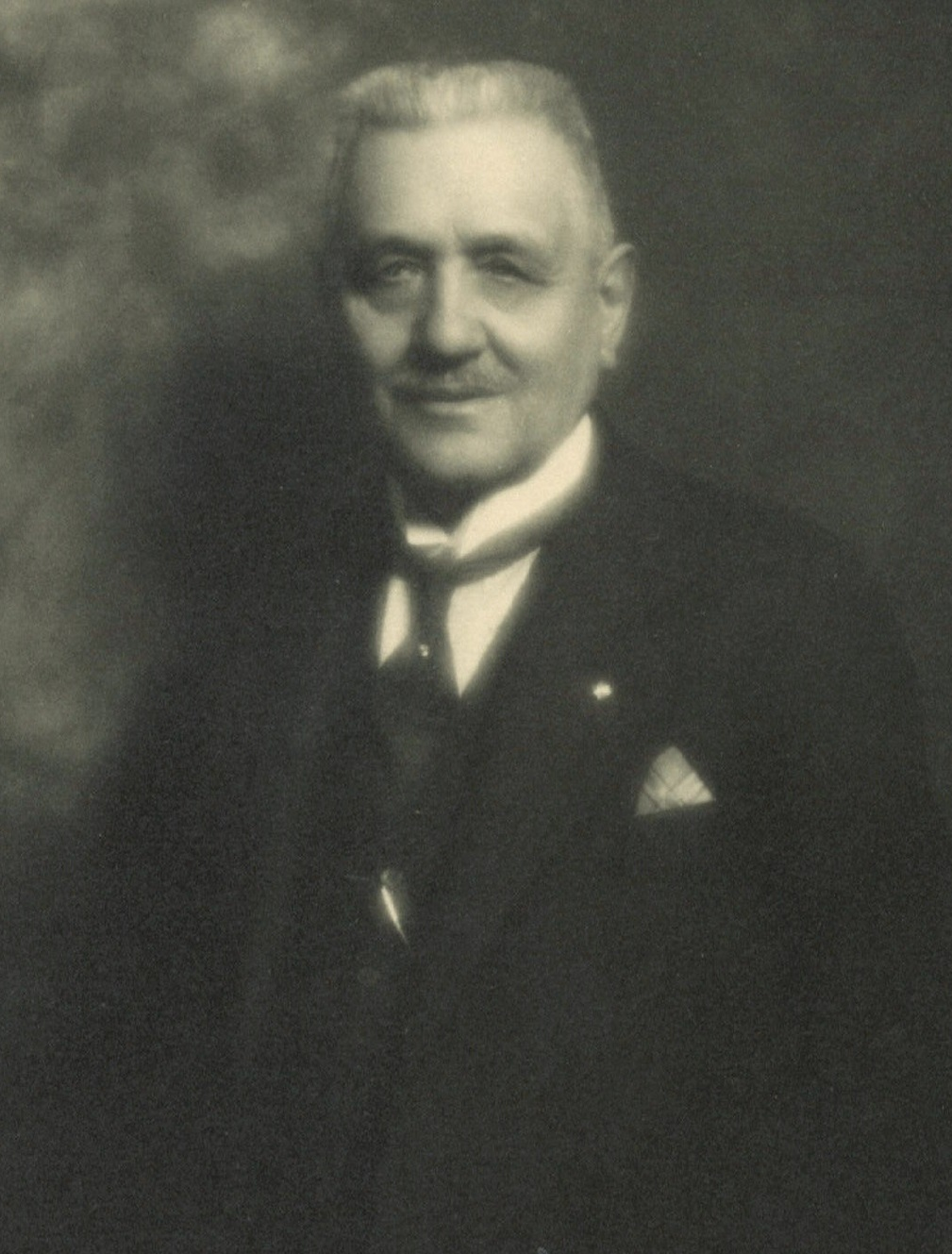
Antonio Bernocchi, founder and patron of Bernocchi Cup, Legnano, 1919

The Coppa Bernocchi is a European bicycle race held in Legnano, Italy. From 2005 to 2019, the race was organised as a 1.1 event on the UCI Europe Tour, before joining the UCI ProSeries in 2020.

In 1919 the business magnate Antonio Bernocchi founded the Coppa Bernocchi (or Bernocchi Cup), with his brothers Andrea and Michele Bernocchi in Legnano, and give the executive organization of the race to the family friend Pino Cozzi, President of the "Unione Sportiva Legnanese", sports club which has since organized the cycling race, which used the prestige of the Bernocchi brand license, already known all over the world, to publicize the race that will become one of the most prestigious in Europe. At the Bernocchi Cup have participated, and sometimes won all the greatest champions in the history of cycling, including Fausto Coppi, Pierino Bestetti, Michele Gismondi, Gino Bartali.

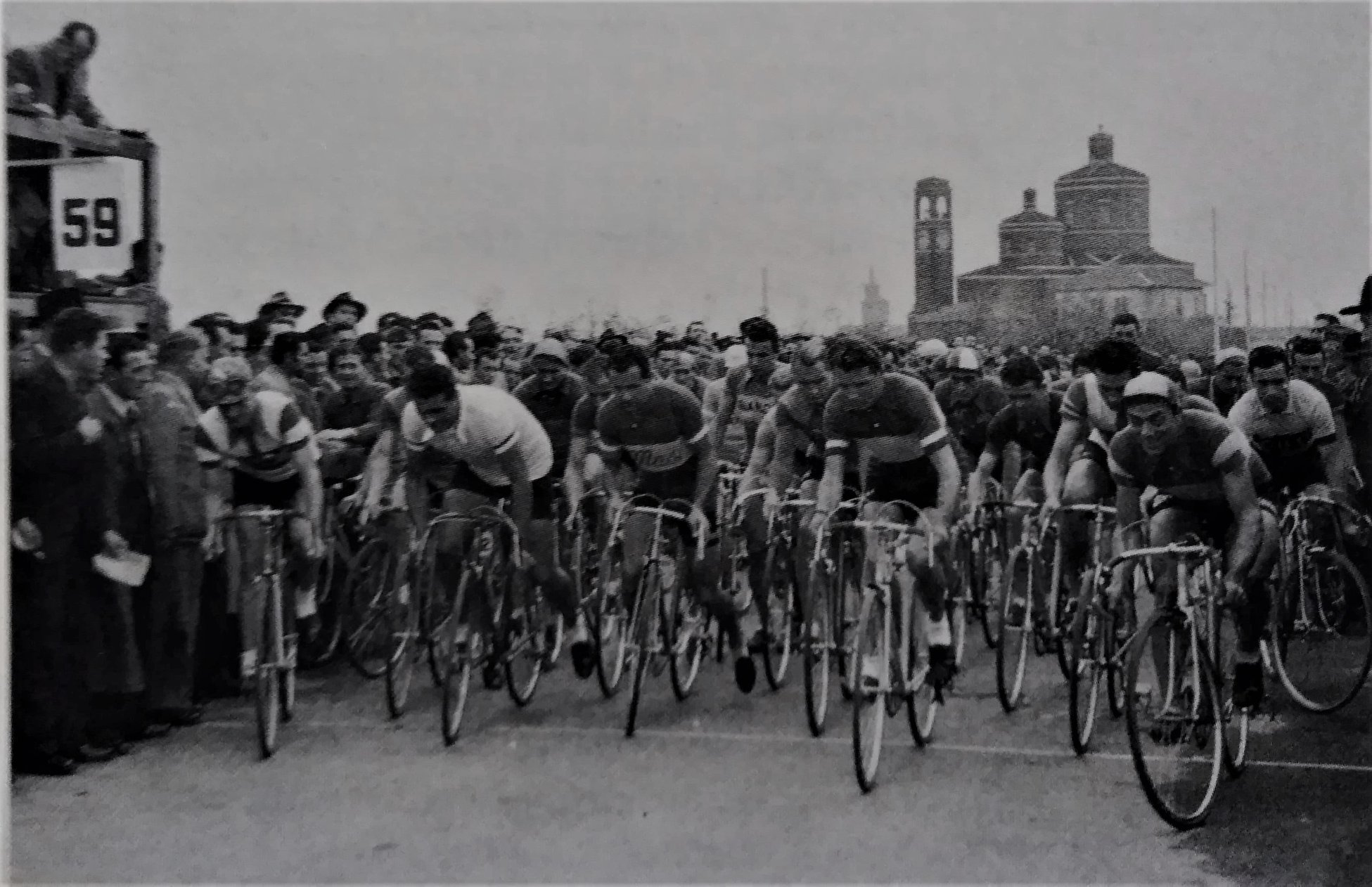
Departure of the 1935 Coppa Bernocchi

It is the last race of Trittico Lombardo, which includes three races held around the region of Lombardy in three consecutive days. These races are Tre Valli Varesine, Coppa Ugo Agostoni and Coppa Bernocchi.

Coppa Bernocchi is one of the most historic cycling races in Europe, with over a hundred years of history, and one of the most important in Italy.

== Winners ==
Year	Country	Rider	Team
1919	Italy	Ruggero Ferrario	
1920	Italy	Giovanni Tragella	
1921	Italy	Angelo Testa	
1922	Italy	Libero Ferrario	
1923	Italy	Libero Ferrario	
1924	Italy	Alfredo Dinale	
1925	Italy	Luigi Mainetti	
1926	Italy	Giuseppe Pancera	Olympia–Dunlop
1927	Italy	Giuseppe Pancera	Berrettini–Hutchinson
1928	Italy	Carlo Galluzzi	Maino–Dunlop
1929	Italy	Allegro Grandi	Bianchi–Pirelli
1930	Italy	Eugenio Gestri	individual
1931	No race		
1932	Italy	Marco Giuntelli	Gerbi
1933	Italy	Bruno Negri	individual
1934	Italy	Pietro Rimoldi	Bianchi
1935	Italy	Gino Bartali	Fréjus
1936	Italy	Enrico Mollo	Gloria
1937	Italy	Francesco Albani	individual
1938	Italy	Cino Cinelli	Fréjus
1939	Italy	Adolfo Leoni	Bianchi
1940	Italy	Aldo Bini	Bianchi
1941	Italy	Severino Canavesi	Gloria
1942	Italy	Glauco Servadei	Bianchi
1943	No race		
1944	Italy	Oreste Conte	Benotto
1945	Italy	Sergio Maggini	Benotto
1946	Italy	Osvaldo Bailo	Girardengo
1947	Italy	Mario Ricci	Legnano–Pirelli
1948	Italy	Virgilio Salimbeni	Legnano–Pirelli
1949	Italy	Mario Ricci	Viscontea
1950	Italy	Fiorenzo Crippa	Bianchi–Ursus
1951	Italy	Luigi Casola	Atala–Pirelli
1952	Italy	Primo Volpi	Arbos–Pirelli
1953	Italy	Giorgio Albani	Legnano–Pirelli
	Italy	Antonio Bevilacqua	Benotto–Levriere
1954	Italy	Fausto Coppi	Bianchi–Pirelli
1955	Italy	Renato Ponzini	Arbos–Pirelli
1956	Italy	Vasco Modena	Arbos–Bif–Clément
1957	Belgium	Rik Van Looy	Faema–Guerra
1958	Belgium	Rik Van Looy	Faema–Guerra
1959	Italy	Noè Conti	Bianchi–Pirelli
1960	Italy	Giuseppe Fallarini	Ignis
1961	Italy	Arturo Sabbadin	Philco
1962	Italy	Pierino Baffi	Ghigi
1963	Italy	Aldo Moser	Firte
1964	Italy	Gianni Motta	Molteni
1965	Italy	Adriano Durante	Molteni
1966	Italy	Raffaele Marcoli	Sanson
1967	Italy	Vittorio Adorni	Salamini–Luxor
1968	Italy	Franco Bitossi	Filotex
1969	Italy	Giacinto Santambrogio	Molteni
1970	Italy	Pietro Guerra	Salvarani
1971	Italy	Virginio Levati	Salvarani
1972	Italy	Marino Basso	Salvarani
1973	Italy	Felice Gimondi	Bianchi–Campagnolo
1974	Italy	Francesco Moser	Filotex
1975	Italy	Enrico Paolini	Scic
1976	Italy	Franco Bitossi	Zonca-Santini
1977	Italy	Carmelo Barone	Fiorella Mocassini
1978	Italy	Giovanni Battaglin	Fiorella–Citroën
1979	Italy	Valerio Lualdi	Bianchi–Faema
1980	Italy	Giuseppe Saronni	Gis Gelati
1981	Italy	Giuseppe Saronni	Gis Gelati–Campagnolo
1982	Italy	Silvano Contini	Bianchi–Piaggio
1983	Italy	Palmiro Masciarelli	Gis Gelati–Campagnolo
1984	Italy	Vittorio Algeri	Metauro Mobili–Pinarello
1985	Netherlands	Johan van der Velde	Vini Ricordi–Pinarello–Sidermec
1986	Italy	Roberto Gaggioli	Ecoflam–Jolly–BFB
1987	Italy	Guido Bontempi	Carrera Jeans–Vagabond
1988	Italy	Guido Bontempi	Carrera Jeans–Vagabond
1989	Denmark	Rolf Sørensen	Ariostea
1990	Italy	Davide Cassani	Ariostea
1991	Italy	Giorgio Furlan	Ariostea
1992	France	Charly Mottet	R.M.O.
1993	Denmark	Rolf Sørensen	Carrera Jeans–Tassoni
1994	Italy	Bruno Cenghialta	Gewiss–Ballan
1995	Italy	Stefano Zanini	Gewiss–Ballan
1996	Italy	Fabio Baldato	MG Maglificio–Technogym
1997	Italy	Gianluca Bortolami	Festina–Lotus
1998	Italy	Fabio Sacchi	Team Polti
1999	Italy	Giancarlo Raimondi	Liquigas
2000	Latvia	Romāns Vainšteins	Vini Caldirola–Sidermec
2001	Italy	Paolo Valoti	Alessio–Bianchi
2002	Italy	Daniele Nardello	Mapei–Quick-Step
2003	Italy	Sergio Barbero	Lampre
2004	Italy	Angelo Furlan	Alessio–Bianchi
2005	Italy	Danilo Napolitano	LPR–Piacenza
2006	Italy	Danilo Napolitano	Lampre–Fondital
2007	Italy	Danilo Napolitano	Lampre–Fondital
2008	Great Britain	Steve Cummings	Barloworld
2009	Italy	Luca Paolini	Acqua & Sapone–Caffè Mokambo
2010	Italy	Manuel Belletti	Colnago–CSF Inox
2011	Belarus	Yauheni Hutarovich	FDJ
2012	Italy	Sacha Modolo	Colnago–CSF Bardiani
2013	Italy	Sacha Modolo	Bardiani Valvole–CSF Inox
2014	Italy	Elia Viviani	Cannondale
2015	Italy	Vincenzo Nibali	Astana
2016	Italy	Giacomo Nizzolo	Italian national team
2017	Italy	Sonny Colbrelli	Bahrain–Merida
2018	Italy	Sonny Colbrelli	Bahrain–Merida
2019	Germany	Phil Bauhaus	Bahrain–Merida
2020	No race due to COVID-19 pandemic, replaced by Gran Trittico Lombardo		
2021	Belgium	Remco Evenepoel	Deceuninck–Quick-Step
2022	Italy	Davide Ballerini	Quick-Step Alpha Vinyl Team
2023	Belgium	Wout van Aert	Team Jumbo–Visma
2024	Belgium	Stan Van Tricht	Alpecin–Deceuninck
2025	France	Dorian Godon	Decathlon–AG2R La Mondiale
2026	France	Noa Isidore	Decathlon CMA CGM

== Wins per country ==
Wins	Country
90	Italy
5	Belgium
3	France
2	Denmark
1	Netherlands; Latvia; United Kingdom; Belarus; Germany

- 103 races registered / although 102 races held only / 101 wins, (102 names because one doubled)
- 1931 = Winner Alfredo Bovet (Italy), disqualified for not having signed in at one of the controls
- 1953 = Double-Win (Albani / Bevilacqua)
- 2020 = Winner Gorka Izagirre (Spain), Race: "Grande Trittico Lombardo", August 3, 2020

== See also ==
- Antonio Bernocchi
