= Giro della Provincia di Grosseto =

Race details
- Date: Mid-February
- Region: Province of Grosseto, Italy
- English name: Tour of the Province of Grosseto
- Local name: Giro della Provincia di Grosseto
- Discipline: Road
- Competition: UCI Europe Tour 2.1
- Type: Stage Race
- Organiser: G.S. Emilia
- Web site: www.gsemilia.it/web/

History
- First edition: 2008
- Editions: 2 (as of 2009)
- First winner: Filippo Pozzato (ITA)
- Most recent: Daniele Pietropolli (ITA)

Giro della Provincia di Grosseto is a three-day cycling race in the Province of Grosseto, Italy. The stage race was established in 2008 as a 2.1 event on the UCI Europe Tour. In 2008, the second stage had to be annulled following protests by riders of the unsafe nature of the course finale. The inaugural event was won by Italian Filippo Pozzato of the Liquigas team.

== Past winners ==
Year	Country	Rider	Team
2008	Italy	Filippo Pozzato	Liquigas
2009	Italy	Daniele Pietropolli	LPR Brakes–Farnese Vini
