= Enrico Gasparotto =

Italian-born Swiss road racing cyclist

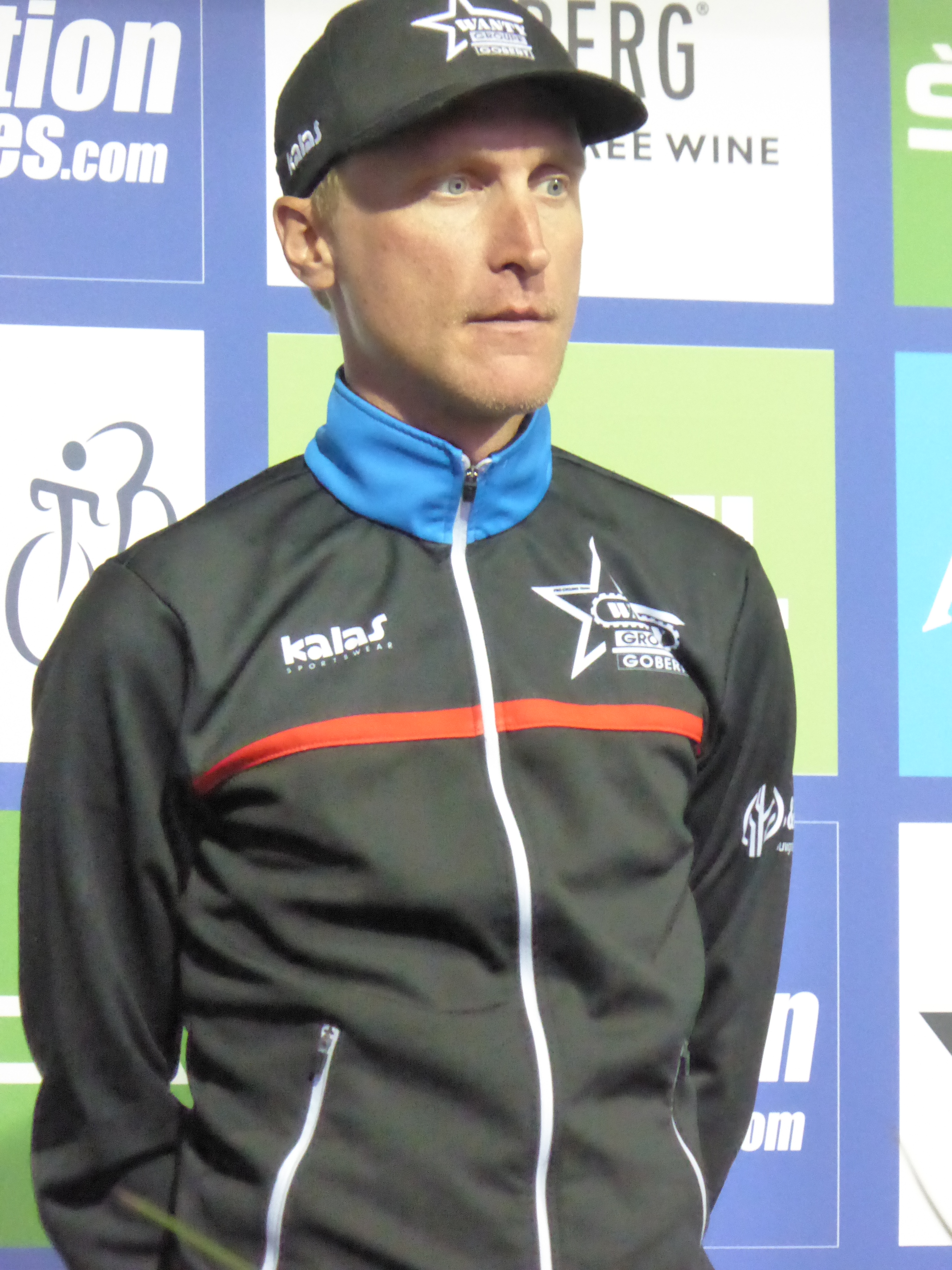
- Gasparotto at the 2016 Tour of Britain

Personal information
- Full name: Enrico Gasparotto
- Nickname: Giallo
- Born: 22 March 1982 (age 44) Sacile, Italy
- Height: 1.74 m (5 ft 9 in)
- Weight: 65 kg (143 lb)

Cycling career
- Sport: Cycling
- Current team: Red Bull–Bora–Hansgrohe
- Discipline: Road
- Role: Rider (retired); Directeur sportif
- Rider type: Puncheur; Classics specialist

Professional teams
- 2005–2007: Liquigas–Bianchi
- 2008: Barloworld
- 2009: Lampre–NGC
- 2010–2014: Astana
- 2015–2016: Wanty–Groupe Gobert
- 2017–2018: Bahrain–Merida
- 2019–2020: Team Dimension Data

Managerial teams
- 2021: Nippo–Provence–PTS Conti
- 2022–: Bora–Hansgrohe

Major wins
- Grand Tours Giro d'Italia 1 TTT stage (2007) Stage races Ster Elektrotoer (2008) One-day races and Classics National Road Race Championships (2005) Amstel Gold Race (2012, 2016) Others UCI Europe Tour (2007–08)

Enrico Gasparotto (born 22 March 1982) is an Italian-born Swiss former professional road racing cyclist, who rode professionally between 2005 and 2020, for seven different teams. After retiring, he worked as a directeur sportif for UCI Continental team EF Education–Nippo Development Team in 2021 before joining Bora–Hansgrohe in a similar role the following year.

== Career ==
Born in Sacile, Gasparotto turned professional in 2005 with Liquigas–Bianchi and stayed with the team for three years. At the 2007 Giro d'Italia, Gasparotto led his Liquigas squad to a stage 1 team time trial win and wore the pink jersey the following day.

Gasparotto achieved his first Classics victory at the 2012 Amstel Gold Race; he won the race in an uphill finish, after Óscar Freire was caught 90 m (300 ft) before the finish line, and Gasparotto out-sprinted Lotto–Belisol's Jelle Vanendert and Peter Sagan of Liquigas–Cannondale. One week later, he took part in Liège–Bastogne–Liège, finishing third by beating a small group to the sprint in a race won by fellow Astana teammate, Maxim Iglinsky.

At the Vuelta a España, bad luck hit Gasparotto and the Astana squad on the first stage, a 16.5 km (10.3 mi) team time trial held in Pamplona. His teammates Paolo Tiralongo, Alexsandr Dyachenko, Andrey Zeits and Gasparotto himself crashed in an accident that was not picked up by the television cameras. His teammates could pick themselves up and continue, as did Gasparotto, but it was revealed that his collarbone was fractured in three places and he had to abandon the Spanish race.

Gasparotto took a second Amstel Gold triumph when he won the 2016 edition of the race, defeating Michael Valgren in a two-up sprint after the pair broke away from the main group in the closing stages of the race. It was Gasparotto's first win since his 2012 victory, and he dedicated it to Antoine Demoitié, his teammate who had died after a crash at Gent–Wevelgem the previous month.

== Major results ==
2004
1st Stage 5 Giro del Friuli-Venezia Giulia
3rd Gran Premio di Poggiana
2005
1st Road race, Italian National Road Championships
1st Stage 2 Volta a Catalunya
3rd Overall Uniqa Classic
5th Coppa Bernocchi
6th Gran Premio Città di Misano – Adriatico
10th Paris–Tours
2006
1st Memorial Cimurri
3rd Coppa Sabatini
6th Scheldeprijs
2007
Giro d'Italia

1st Stage 1 (TTT)
Held after Stages 1 & 3

2nd Overall Danmark Rundt
4th Brabantse Pijl
Vuelta a Mallorca

5th Trofeo Mallorca
9th Trofeo Cala Millor

9th Memorial Cimurri
2008
1st Overall Ster Elektrotoer

1st Stage 3

1st Giro della Romagna
2nd Overall Tirreno–Adriatico
2nd Coppa Placci
3rd Overall Three Days of De Panne

1st Stage 1

3rd Gran Premio di Lugano
4th Trofeo Laigueglia
5th Gran Premio Bruno Beghelli
6th Overall Giro della Provincia di Grosseto
7th Overall Tour du Poitou-Charentes
7th Brabantse Pijl
10th Overall Danmark Rundt
2009
1st Sprints classification, Tour de Suisse
2nd Overall Giro della Provincia di Grosseto
3rd Coppa Bernocchi
8th Memorial Cimurri
2010
1st Stage 5 Tirreno–Adriatico
3rd Amstel Gold Race
9th Montepaschi Strade Bianche
2011
4th Tre Valli Varesine
2012
1st Amstel Gold Race
3rd Liège–Bastogne–Liège
7th Trofeo Laigueglia
2013
5th Giro di Lombardia
6th Liège–Bastogne–Liège
7th Grand Prix Cycliste de Montréal
9th Amstel Gold Race
2014
8th Amstel Gold Race
8th Grand Prix Cycliste de Québec
9th Grand Prix Cycliste de Montréal
9th Tre Valli Varesine
2015
8th Amstel Gold Race
8th Grand Prix of Aargau Canton
9th Coppa Ugo Agostoni
2016
1st Amstel Gold Race
2nd Brabantse Pijl
5th La Flèche Wallonne
6th Overall Tour of Belgium
2018
3rd Amstel Gold Race
3rd Gran Premio di Lugano
3rd Coppa Ugo Agostoni
6th Liège–Bastogne–Liège
2019
7th Brabantse Pijl
9th Overall Arctic Race of Norway
10th La Flèche Wallonne

=== Grand Tour general classification results timeline ===
Grand Tour	2007	2008	2009	2010	2011	2012	2013	2014	2015	2016	2017	2018	2019	2020
Giro d'Italia	97	92	60	DNF	—	66	—	97	—	—	76	—	69	—
Tour de France	—	—	—	—	—	—	95	—	—	—	—	—	—	—
/ Vuelta a España	—	—	82	68	78	DNF	—	—	—	—	—	—	—	120

==== Classics results ====
Monument	2005	2006	2007	2008	2009	2010	2011	2012	2013	2014	2015	2016	2017	2018	2019	2020
Milan–San Remo	—	—	31	12	137	13	90	DNF	14	DNF	—	—	53	—	49	—
Tour of Flanders	—	—	—	DNF	—	DNF	—	—	—	—	—	—	—	—	—	—
Paris–Roubaix	Did not contest during his career															
Liège–Bastogne–Liège	—	—	—	—	55	—	44	3	6	12	16	12	37	6	DNF	38
Giro di Lombardia	DNF	—	—	DNF	—	DNF	—	—	5	DNF	—	—	DNF	—	—	DNF
Classic	2005	2006	2007	2008	2009	2010	2011	2012	2013	2014	2015	2016	2017	2018	2019	2020
Strade Bianche	Did not exist		—	—	—	8	—	30	—	—	—	—	—	—	—	—
Scheldeprijs	—	6	—	—	—	—	—	—	—	—	—	—	—	—	—	—
Brabantse Pijl	—	—	4	7	—	—	—	—	—	—	—	2	14	38	7	DNF
Amstel Gold Race	—	—	—	—	39	3	35	1	9	8	8	1	DNF	3	42	NH
La Flèche Wallonne	—	—	—	—	19	—	61	11	30	94	15	5	DNF	27	10	30
Grand Prix Cycliste de Québec	Race did not exist					—	—	—	27	8	—	—	31	36	50	NH
Grand Prix Cycliste de Montréal	Race did not exist					—	—	—	7	9	—	—	77	27	DNF	NH
Paris–Tours	10	44	16	—	—	—	—	—	24	—	—	—	—	—	—	—

Legend
—	Did not compete
DNF	Did not finish
NH	Not held
