= Nick Nuyens =

Belgian cyclist

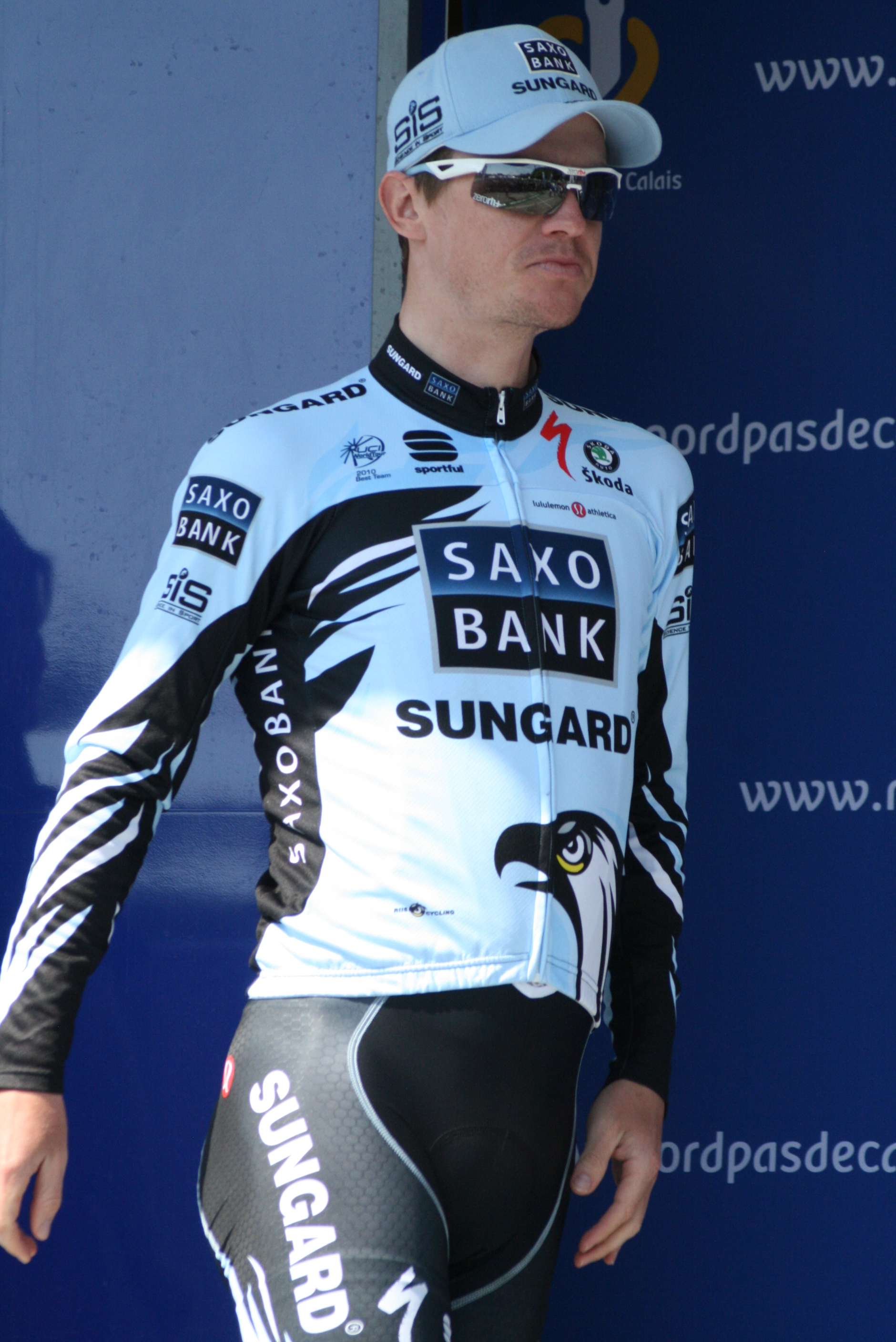
- Nuyens at the 2011 Four Days of Dunkirk

Personal information
- Full name: Nick Nuyens
- Nickname: Bom van Bevel ("Bomb from Bevel")
- Born: 5 May 1980 (age 46) Lier, Flanders, Belgium
- Height: 1.77 m (5 ft 10 in)
- Weight: 68 kg (150 lb)

Cycling career
- Sport: Cycling
- Discipline: Road
- Role: Rider
- Rider type: Classics specialist

Professional teams
- 2003–2006: Quick-Step–Davitamon
- 2007–2008: Cofidis
- 2009–2010: Rabobank
- 2011–2012: Saxo Bank–SunGard
- 2013–2014: Garmin–Sharp

Major wins
- Stage races Étoile de Bessèges (2007) Ster Elektrotoer (2004) Tour of Britain (2005) One-day races and Classics Tour of Flanders (2011) Dwars door Vlaanderen (2011) Kuurne–Brussels–Kuurne (2006) Omloop Het Volk (2005) Grand Prix de Wallonie (2004, 2005, 2009) Paris–Brussels (2004)

Nick Nuyens (born 5 May 1980) is a Belgian former professional road racing cyclist who last rode for Garmin–Sharp in the UCI World Tour. His biggest wins included the semi-classics Kuurne–Brussels–Kuurne, Omloop Het Volk, Paris–Brussels and the classic Tour of Flanders. He was a classics rider. His first wife was the Belgian multiple national champion, Evy Van Damme, with whom he had three children. In 2015 he married Lynn Peeters. He retired in 2015 after failing to secure a new contract.

== Career ==
The year 2011 was a good one for him, since he took the victory on two classics in Flanders. At the end of March, he prevailed in a sprint at the Dwars door Vlaanderen, after desperately trying to steer clear of the group in the last 20 kilometres (12 mi) of the race. Geraint Thomas of Team Sky finished second, while the lead group was a few seconds away. Two weeks later, Nuyens took one of the Monuments of cycling, the Tour of Flanders. After the Muur van Geraardsbergen, one of the big favourites, Fabian Cancellara, was caught by the bunch. Nuyens was part of the chasers that bridged to the leading group in the final kilometers, and a trio of riders were left to battle it out for the finish while another group was very close to them in the final meters. Nuyens got the better of Sylvain Chavanel (Quick-Step) and Cancellara in the three-man sprint. Nuyens said of his biggest win of his career: "It was only in the final 50 meters that I started to fully realize what was happening, that I was about to win this beautiful race."

Nuyens left Saxo Bank–Tinkoff Bank at the end of the 2012 season, and joined Garmin–Sharp on a three-year contract from the 2013 season onwards.

During the 2009 season he used a wood block under his saddle to prevent it from sagging in wet conditions.

Since 2017 Nuyens has been the general manager of the Vérandas Willems–Crelan cycling team, which is a road Pro Continental cycling team and one of the main Belgian cyclo-cross teams.

== Major results ==
2002
1st Road race, National Under-23 Road Championships
1st Ronde Van Vlaanderen Beloften
5th La Côte Picarde
2003
1st Nationale Sluitingsprijs
6th Memorial Rik Van Steenbergen
7th Overall Uniqa Classic
7th Gran Premio Bruno Beghelli
9th Overall Tour de Picardie
2004
1st Overall Ster Elektrotoer

1st Stage 3

1st Paris–Brussels
1st Grand Prix de Wallonie
1st Gran Premio Industria e Commercio di Prato
3rd Overall Tour of Britain
6th Overall Tour de l'Ain
7th Overall Driedaagse van West-Vlaanderen

1st Young rider classification

9th Overall Four Days of Dunkirk
9th Overall Tour de Picardie
2005
1st Overall Tour of Britain

1st Stages 1 & 5

1st Omloop Het Volk
1st Grand Prix de Wallonie
2nd Overall Ster Elektrotoer
2nd Druivenkoers Overijse
5th Road race, National Road Championships
6th Dwars door Vlaanderen
7th Brabantse Pijl
2006
1st Kuurne–Brussels–Kuurne
1st Stage 3 Tour de Suisse
2nd Grand Prix de Wallonie
2nd Grand Prix of Aargau Canton
3rd Brabantse Pijl
4th Overall Tour of Britain
4th Vattenfall Cyclassics
4th Tour du Haut Var
7th Memorial Rik Van Steenbergen
2007
1st Overall Étoile de Bessèges

1st Stage 3

1st Stage 1 Eneco Tour
2nd Brabantse Pijl
4th Road race, National Road Championships
4th Omloop Het Volk
7th Tour of Flanders
8th Halle–Ingooigem
2008
2nd Tour of Flanders
2nd Omloop Het Volk
8th Brabantse Pijl
9th Road race, UCI Road World Championships
10th Dwars door Vlaanderen
2009
1st Grand Prix de Wallonie
5th Grote Prijs Jef Scherens
7th E3 Prijs Vlaanderen
8th Amstel Gold Race
8th Kuurne–Brussels–Kuurne
2010
1st Stage 5 Tour of Austria
5th Road race, National Road Championships
9th Overall Tour of Belgium
2011
1st Tour of Flanders
1st Dwars door Vlaanderen
3rd Klasika Primavera

=== Grand Tour general classification results timeline ===
Grand Tour	2005	2006	2007	2008	2009	2010	2011	2012	2013
Giro d'Italia	DNF	—	—	DNF	—	—	—	—	—
Tour de France	—	—	DNF	—	—	—	—	121	—
Vuelta a España	—	—	—	78	—	127	161	—	DNF

=== Classics results timeline ===
Monument	2003	2004	2005	2006	2007	2008	2009	2010	2011	2012	2013	2014
Milan–San Remo	—	176	162	122	44	20	32	61	70	—	—	—
Tour of Flanders	—	—	21	17	7	2	15	DNF	1	—	—	—
Paris–Roubaix	—	—	40	57	DNF	21	—	—	—	—	—	—
Liège–Bastogne–Liège	—	129	—	—	—	—	—	—	DNF	—	—	—
Giro di Lombardia	DNF	—	—	—	—	—	—	—	61	—	—	—
Classic	2003	2004	2005	2006	2007	2008	2009	2010	2011	2012	2013	2014
Omloop Het Nieuwsblad	40	—	1	90	4	2	14	55	—	—	65	62
Kuurne–Brussels–Kuurne	—	—	DNF	1	63	DNF	8	DNF	—	—	NH	DNF
Dwars door Vlaanderen	51	—	6	29	14	10	16	12	1	—	—	44
E3 Harelbeke	—	—	—	—	—	—	7	DNF	38	—	DNF	59
Gent–Wevelgem	—	22	34	23	23	—	DNF	—	39	—	—	116
Brabantse Pijl	—	36	7	3	2	8	—	22	—	—	—	51
Amstel Gold Race	—	—	—	—	121	—	8	25	27	—	—	—
Paris–Tours	85	DNF	78	29	—	24	18	155	—	—	—	—

Legend
—	Did not compete
DNF	Did not finish
