= Philippe Gilbert =

Belgian cyclist (born 1982)

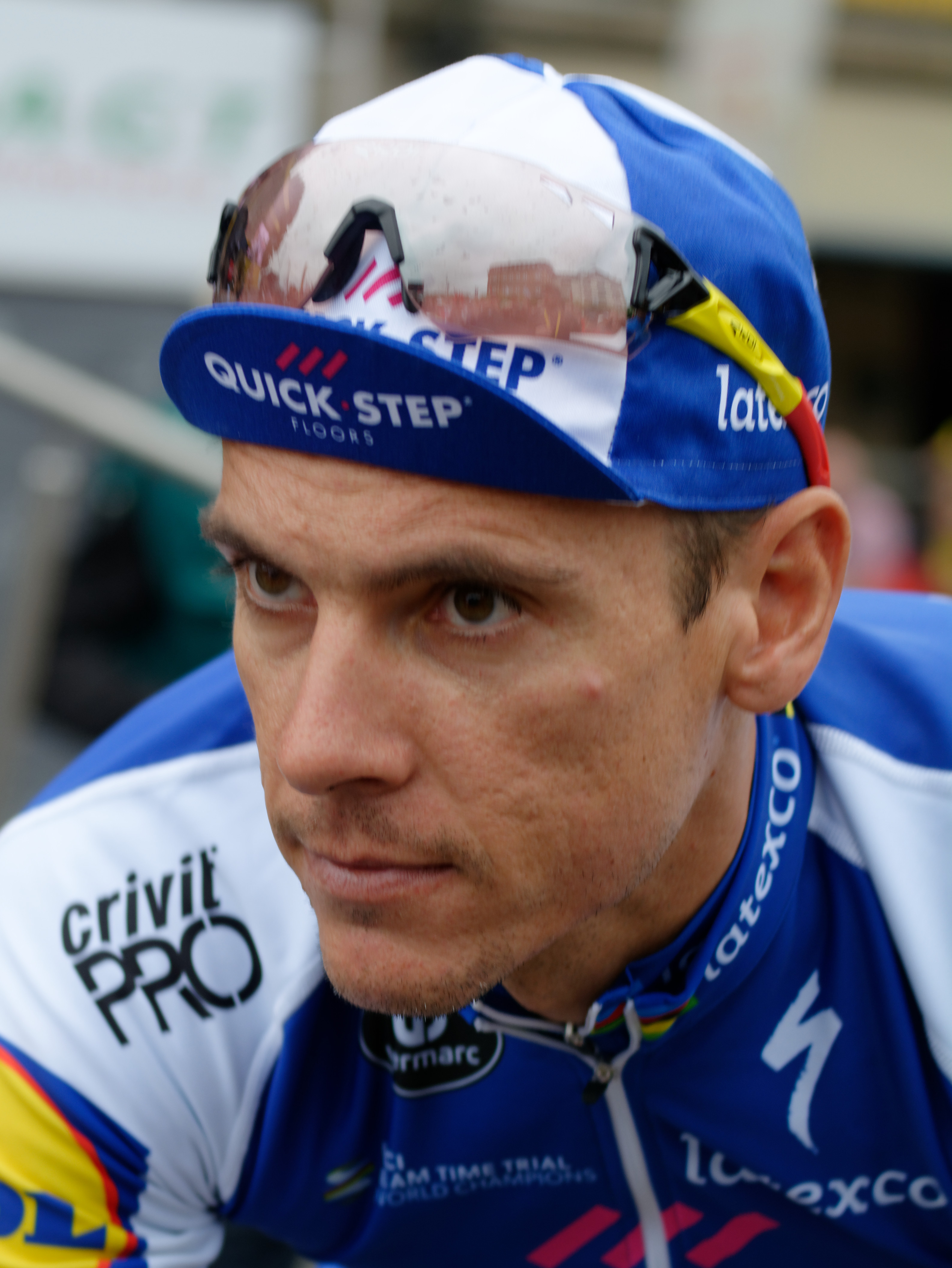
- Gilbert at the 2017 Tour de France

Personal information
- Full name: Philippe Gilbert
- Nicknames: Le sanglier des Ardennes (Boar of the Ardennes); Monsieur Cauberg
- Born: 5 July 1982 (age 44) Verviers, Belgium
- Height: 1.79 m (5 ft 10 1/2 in)
- Weight: 69 kg (152 lb; 10 st 12 lb)

Cycling career
- Sport: Cycling
- Current team: Retired
- Discipline: Road
- Role: Rider
- Rider type: Classics specialist Puncheur

Professional teams
- 2003–2008: FDJeux.com
- 2009–2011: Silence–Lotto
- 2012–2016: BMC Racing Team
- 2017–2019: Quick-Step Floors
- 2020–2022: Lotto–Soudal

Major wins
- Grand Tours Tour de France 1 individual stage (2011) Giro d'Italia 3 individual stages (2009, 2015) Combativity award (2015) Vuelta a España 7 individual stages (2010, 2012, 2013, 2019) Stage races Tour of Beijing (2014) Four Days of Dunkirk (2022) Three Days of De Panne (2017) Tour of Belgium (2011) Ster ZLM Toer (2009, 2011, 2014) One-day races and Classics World Road Race Championships (2012) National Road Race Championships (2011, 2016) National Time Trial Championships (2011) Paris–Roubaix (2019) Tour of Flanders (2017) Liège–Bastogne–Liège (2011) Giro di Lombardia (2009, 2010) Amstel Gold Race (2010, 2011, 2014, 2017) La Flèche Wallonne (2011) Omloop Het Nieuwsblad (2006, 2008) Clásica de San Sebastián (2011) Strade Bianche (2011) Paris–Tours (2008, 2009) Brabantse Pijl (2011, 2014) GP de Québec (2011) Giro del Piemonte/Gran Piemonte (2009, 2010) GP de Fourmies (2006) Other UCI World Tour (2011) Vélo d'Or (2011)
Medal record
Men's road bicycle racing
Representing Belgium
World Championships
Gold medal – first place	2012 Valkenburg	Road race
Representing BMC Racing Team
World Championships
Silver medal – second place	2012 Valkenburg	Team time trial

Philippe Gilbert (born 5 July 1982) is a Belgian former professional road bicycle racer, who is known for being a versatile rider who was able to win four of the five very different profile cycling monuments and also the World Road Race Championships in 2012, and for being one of two riders, along with Davide Rebellin, to have won the three Ardennes classics – the Amstel Gold Race, La Flèche Wallonne and Liège–Bastogne–Liège – in a single season, which he accomplished in 2011. Gilbert also finished the 2011 season as the overall winner of the UCI World Tour.

A Classics specialist, Gilbert has won several classic cycle races, including Paris–Tours twice (2008, 2009), the Giro di Lombardia twice (2009, 2010), the Amstel Gold Race four times (2010, 2011, 2014, 2017), La Flèche Wallonne (2011), Liège–Bastogne–Liège (2011), the Clásica de San Sebastián (2011), the Tour of Flanders (2017), and Paris–Roubaix (2019). He is the second person (and first Belgian) in history to win all three Ardennes classics in a single year. In 2017, Gilbert became the third rider after Eddy Merckx (1975) and Jan Raas (1979) to win both the Tour of Flanders and the Amstel Gold Race in the same year.

He has also won stages at each of the three cycling Grand Tours: three stages at the Giro d'Italia (one in 2009 and two in 2015), one stage at the Tour de France (in 2011), and seven stages at the Vuelta a España (two in both 2010 and 2012, one in 2013 and two in 2019).

Gilbert retired as a professional, after the 2022 Paris–Tours. He celebrated his retirement in Valkenburg aan de Geul where he became world champion and won four Amstel Gold Races. He was honoured with a mural in the caves of the Cauberg.

== Personal life ==
Gilbert currently resides in Monaco. With his ex-wife Patricia Zevaert he has two sons, born 2010 and 2013.

Gilbert's younger brother Jérôme has also been a racing cyclist.

Gilbert committed to serve world peace through sport by joining Peace and Sport.

During the 2021 UCI Road World Championships in Flanders, he was elected to a four-year term as a representative for road cycling on the Union Cycliste Internationale Athletes' Commission, winning 66 per cent of the vote.

== Career ==
=== FDJeux.com (2003–08) ===
==== First three seasons ====
Born in Remouchamps in the municipality of Aywaille, Gilbert turned professional in 2003 by joining FDJeux.com after riding as stagiaire for the team in late 2000. During this season he recorded his first victory by winning a stage in the Tour de l'Avenir. In 2004 he began by winning a stage in the Tour Down Under as well as the young rider classification. He participated in the Cycling at the 2004 Summer Olympics – Men's individual road race at the 2004 Summer Olympics where he finished 49th. He also won the Paris–Corrèze. In 2005 he won several races in France, which allowed him to win the Coupe de France de cyclisme sur route. These victories included the Trophée des Grimpeurs, the Tour du Haut Var and the Polynormande. He also took stages in the Four Days of Dunkirk and the Tour Méditerranéen.

==== 2006 season ====
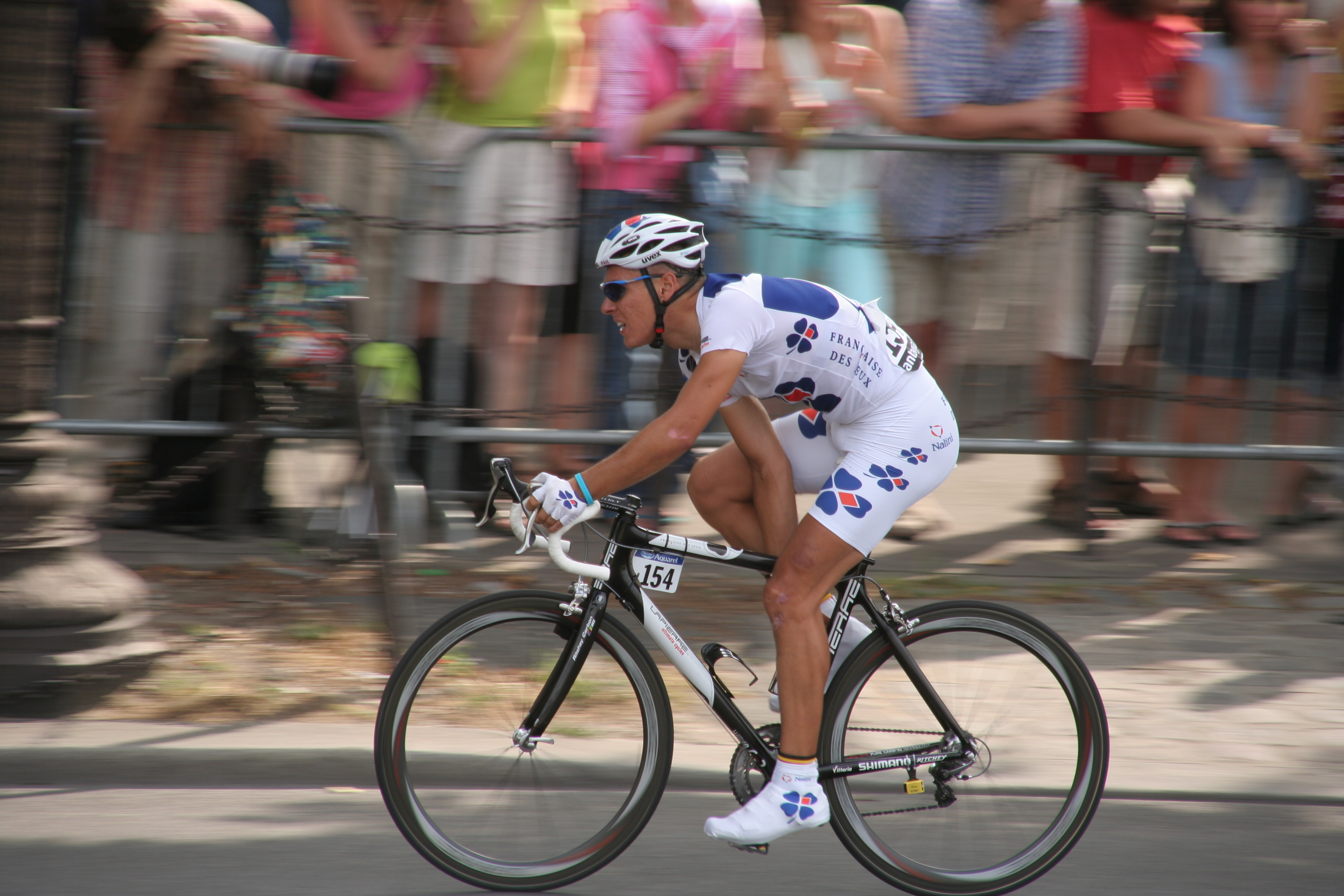
Gilbert at the 2006 Tour de France

2006 would become his most successful year to the point when he won the prestigious Omloop Het Volk after repeatedly attacking until he got away alone with 7 kilometres (4.3 miles) to go. During the season he also won the Grand Prix de Fourmies and the Grand Prix de Wallonie as well as stages at the Critérium du Dauphiné Libéré and the Eneco Tour.

==== 2007 season ====
In early 2007 he had a skin cancer lesion removed from his thigh, delaying the start of his season. That did not stop him from trying himself during Milan–San Remo, where he managed to escape on the Poggio with Riccardo Riccò before being captured 1.2 kilometres (0.75 miles) from the finishing line. He could not get any victory during the season until the Tour du Limousin, where he claimed his only victory in 2007 by winning a stage. In Paris–Tours he was caught with 500 metres (1,600 feet) to go along with Karsten Kroon and Filippo Pozzato.

==== 2008 season ====
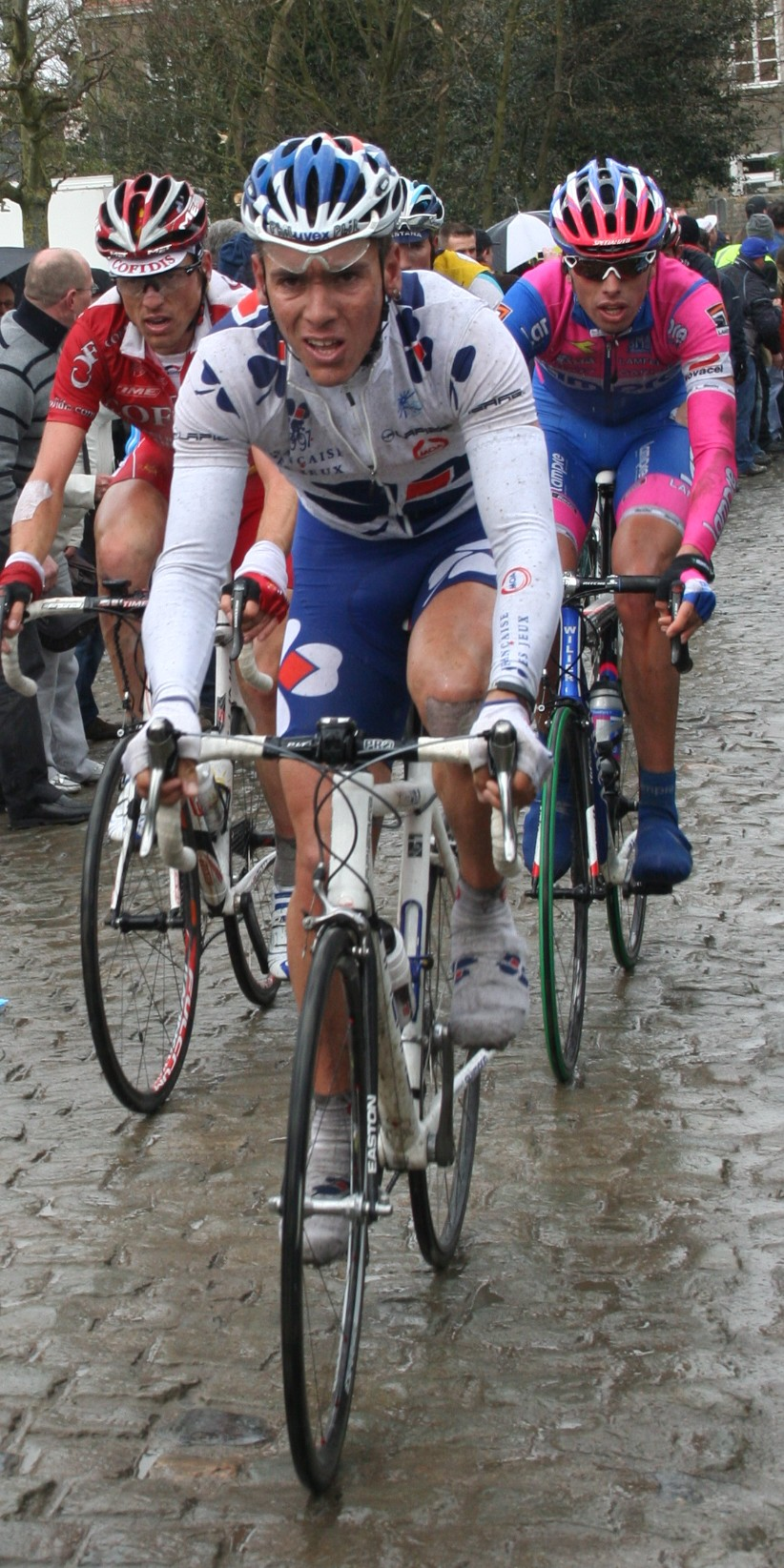
Gilbert at the 2008 Tour of Flanders

Gilbert started 2008 by winning the King of the Mountains competition at the Tour Down Under and the overall classification as well as two stages of the Vuelta a Mallorca. He also finished third in Milan–San Remo, accomplishing his first podium in a monument. He later won Omloop Het Volk for the second time in his career after a solo attack with almost 50 kilometres (31 miles) to go. Four days later he won the GP Samyn. He finished the year by winning the classic Paris–Tours race in a late breakaway where he won a sprint between his three breakaway companions. The peloton finished four seconds back.

=== Silence–Lotto (2009–11) ===
==== 2009 season ====
In 2009 he joined Silence–Lotto to lead the Belgian team in the classics, finishing third at the Tour of Flanders and fourth in both the Amstel Gold Race and Liège–Bastogne–Liège. He also took his first stage in a Grand Tour by winning the 20th stage of the Giro d'Italia and won a stage and the overall classification of the Ster Elektrotoer. Later in the season, he repeated his Paris–Tours win, attacking on the last climb with Tom Boonen and Borut Božič before outsprinting them to the line. A week later, he also won the prestigious Giro di Lombardia after escaping from the peloton with Samuel Sánchez, beating him to the finish by a half-length. It was his fourth victory in 10 days after also winning the Coppa Sabatini and Giro del Piemonte. At the end of the season, he was awarded the Flandrien of the Year award, recognising him as the best Belgian rider of the year.

==== 2010 season ====
In 2010 he won his first classic of the year, April's Amstel Gold Race. After an aggressive race featuring many attacks, he won through a big attack in the last 500 metres (1,600 feet) of the climb to the finish, comfortably winning by several bike lengths from the peloton. He also won the first stage of the Tour of Belgium. Gilbert then ended the 2010 season in superb form. He followed up two stage wins in the Vuelta a España with victories in the Giro del Piemonte and the Giro di Lombardia, repeating his 2009 wins in both races. The Giro di Lombardia was won with a solo attack in atrocious weather conditions.

==== 2011 season ====
In 2011, Gilbert won the Montepaschi Strade Bianche, a race including 70 kilometres (43 miles) of gravel roads. He then had a quadruple consecutive win: first, he won the Brabantse Pijl, then he repeated as winner of the Amstel Gold Race, breaking free on the Cauberg. Three days later, he won La Flèche Wallonne dropping his rivals on the final climb of the Mur de Huy and finally, he won Liège–Bastogne–Liège beating the Schleck brothers in the sprint. Gilbert thus became the second rider, after Davide Rebellin in 2004, to win the three Ardennes classics in a single year. During the first half of the season he also won stages at the Volta ao Algarve, Tirreno–Adriatico as well as the overall classification and a stage of both the Tour of Belgium and Ster ZLM Toer.

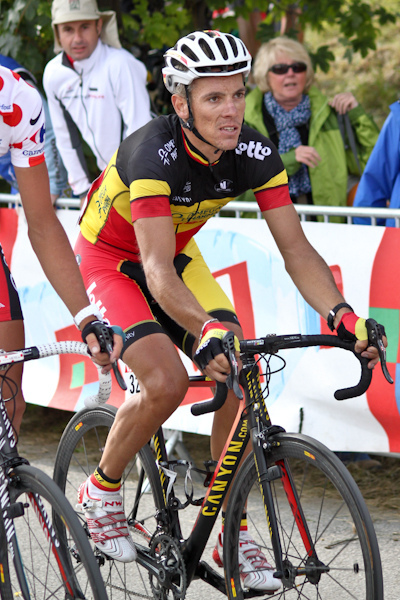
Gilbert at the 2011 Tour de France, wearing the Belgian national champion's jersey.

In late June, Gilbert won the Belgian National Road Race Championships. In July he won the opening 191.5-kilometre (119.0-mile) stage of the Tour de France, winning by three seconds over Cadel Evans, allowing him to be the first person to put on the yellow jersey as overall leader. He lost that jersey in the team time trial the next day but still held the green and polka dot jerseys after stage two. A week after the end of the Tour, Gilbert won the Clásica de San Sebastián, and in mid-August, Gilbert won the 3rd stage at the Eneco Tour, taking his 15th victory of the year.

In September, Gilbert won the Grand Prix Cycliste de Québec and took over the lead of the UCI world rankings with the 80 points awarded to the victor. He followed that performance two days later at the Grand Prix Cycliste de Montréal by finishing third, despite stating that he felt "no pressure" after his Quebec City victory. With that placing, Gilbert deposited another 50 UCI points in his account. He would race in the October Italian classic, the Giro di Lombardia, taking eighth place after he was distanced on the final climb. He eventually closed the season well ahead in the UCI World Tour rankings, with 718 points to the 584 points of his closest competitor, Cadel Evans. He won 18 races in the season, more than any other cyclist in the professional peloton.

Gilbert was appointed as a member of the inaugural UCI Athletes' Commission in 2011.

=== BMC Racing Team (2012–16) ===
==== 2012 season ====
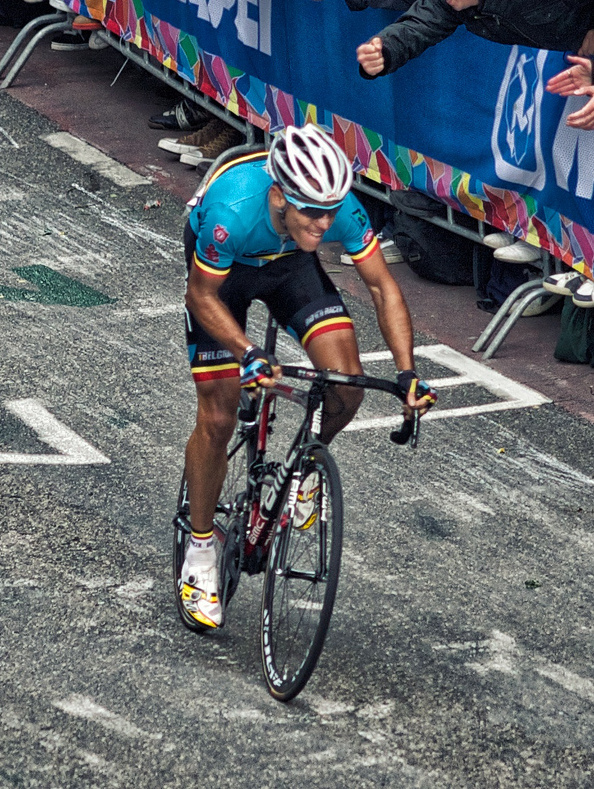
Gilbert sprinting to victory in the road race at the 2012 UCI Road World Championships

In 2012, Gilbert signed for BMC Racing Team on a three-year contract reportedly worth €3 million a year. His goals for his new squad were to perform highly in the Spring classics and help his team-mate Cadel Evans repeat his 2011 feat of winning the Tour de France. Neither of those came to fruition, as Gilbert's best result in the one-day spring races was third at La Flèche Wallonne, where he got deposited on the final climb by Joaquim Rodríguez who won atop the historic Mur de Huy with a slim margin of 4 seconds. Three days prior, he took sixth position at the Amstel Gold Race and was pleased to achieve a top ten ranking in the Ardennes race. He missed out on his goal to bring Evans in yellow to Paris and his best placing in a Tour de France stage was fourth. He also lost both of the Belgian National Championship titles he held, finishing third in the Belgian National Time Trial Championships.

On 26 August 2012, Gilbert finally managed his first victory of the season by winning the ninth stage of the Vuelta a España after breaking away together with Rodríguez. He later won a second stage of the race, winning stage nineteen on 7 September.

On 23 September 2012, Gilbert won the UCI Elite Men's Road Race world championship and the rainbow jersey, ahead of Edvald Boasson Hagen and Alejandro Valverde by producing a massive surge on the final climb of the Cauberg.

==== 2013 season ====
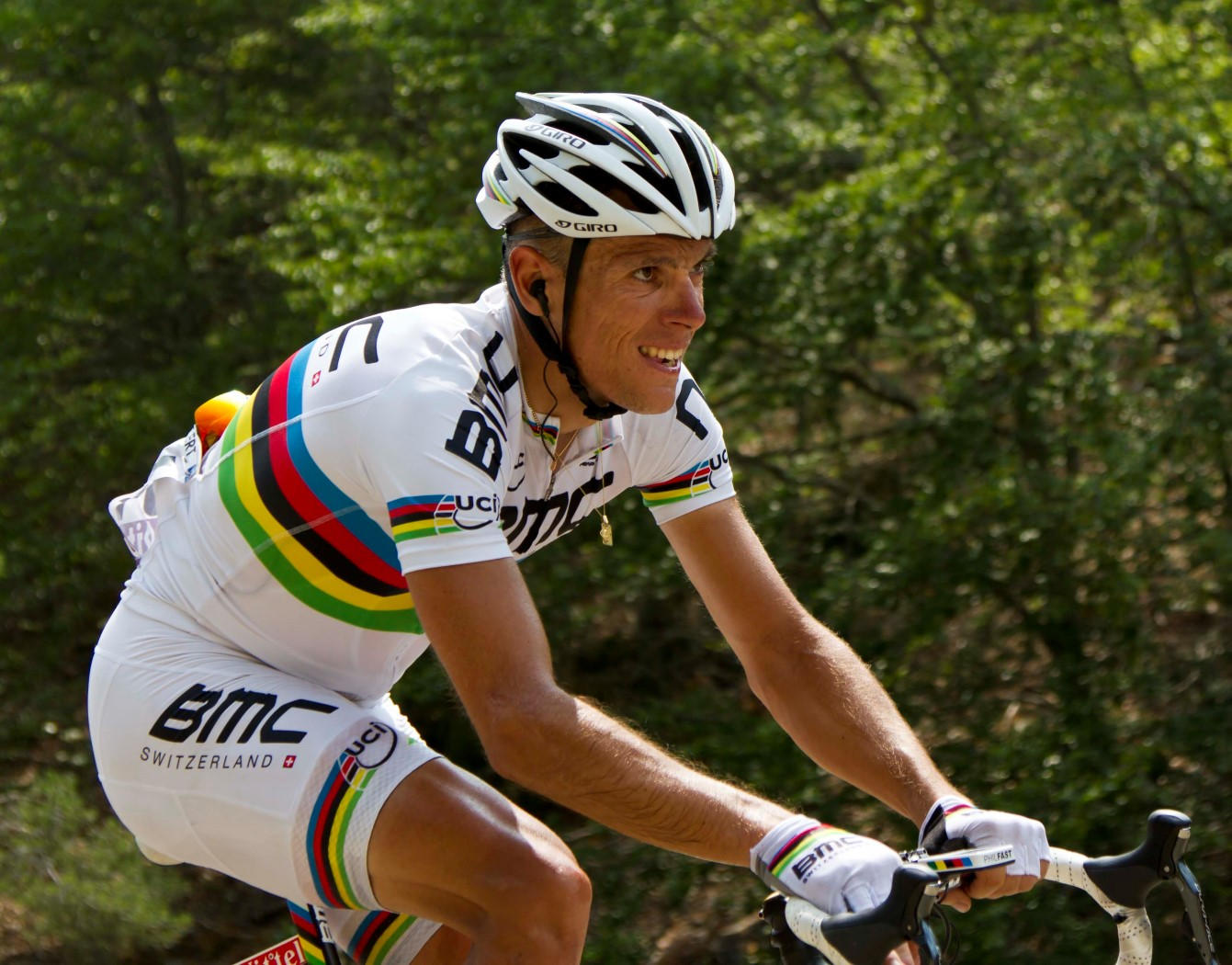
Gilbert wearing the rainbow jersey at the 2013 Tour de France

In 2013, Gilbert headed towards the World Championships without a single win in the rainbow jersey, in danger of his first winless season since turning professional in 2003. He started the Vuelta a España hoping that the competition would, for the second successive year, kick-start his season. After being narrowly defeated in a sprint by Zdeněk Štybar on stage 7, Gilbert finally clinched a victory in the rainbow stripes when he caught and passed Edvald Boasson Hagen to win stage 12.

==== 2014 season ====
In 2014, Gilbert picked up his previous form when in the spring he won his second Brabantse Pijl and his third Amstel Gold Race.

==== 2015 season ====
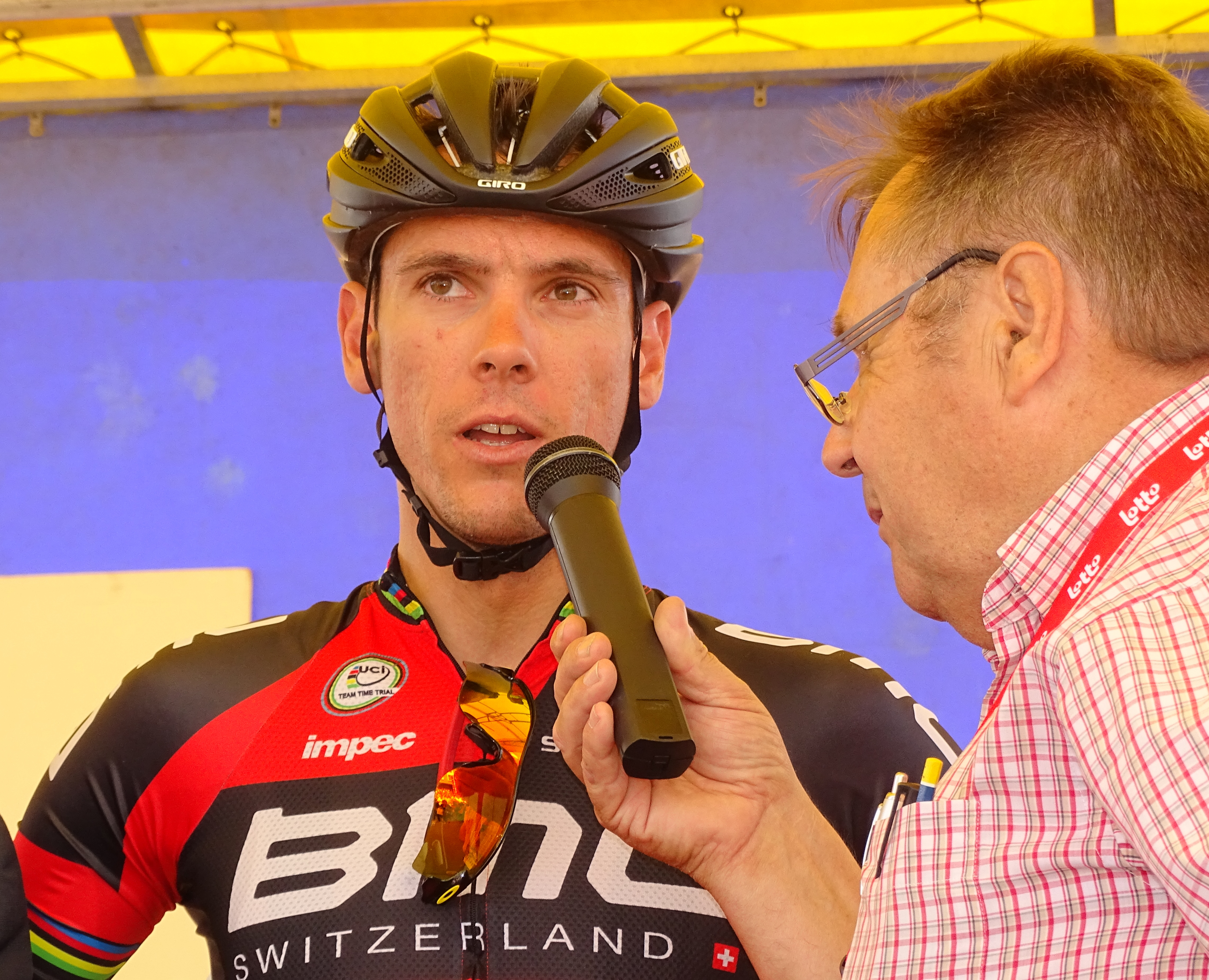
Gilbert in July 2015

Gilbert finished third at Brabantse Pijl, seconds after his teammate Ben Hermans. At the Amstel Gold Race, Gilbert could not repeat his winning ways of 2014 and came in tenth after having attacked on the final climb of the day, the Cauberg. On the next Wednesday, Gilbert crashed out of La Flèche Wallonne. He then took part in Liège–Bastogne–Liège even though he was slightly injured and held on to the main group until the Côte de Saint-Nicolas, where he was dropped and finished 36th. He scored his first victory of the season at the Giro d'Italia, besting the lead group on a sharp incline at the end of Stage 12. He repeated on Stage 18, where he participated in the early break. After being dropped on the last climb of the day, he returned to the remnants of the breakaway after the descent and attacked them to win solo.

==== 2016 season ====
Gilbert took his first victory of the season in February at the one-day race Vuelta a Murcia, winning the sprint of a four-man group. He won the Belgian National Road Race Championships in June.

=== Quick-Step Floors (2017–19) ===
==== 2017 season ====
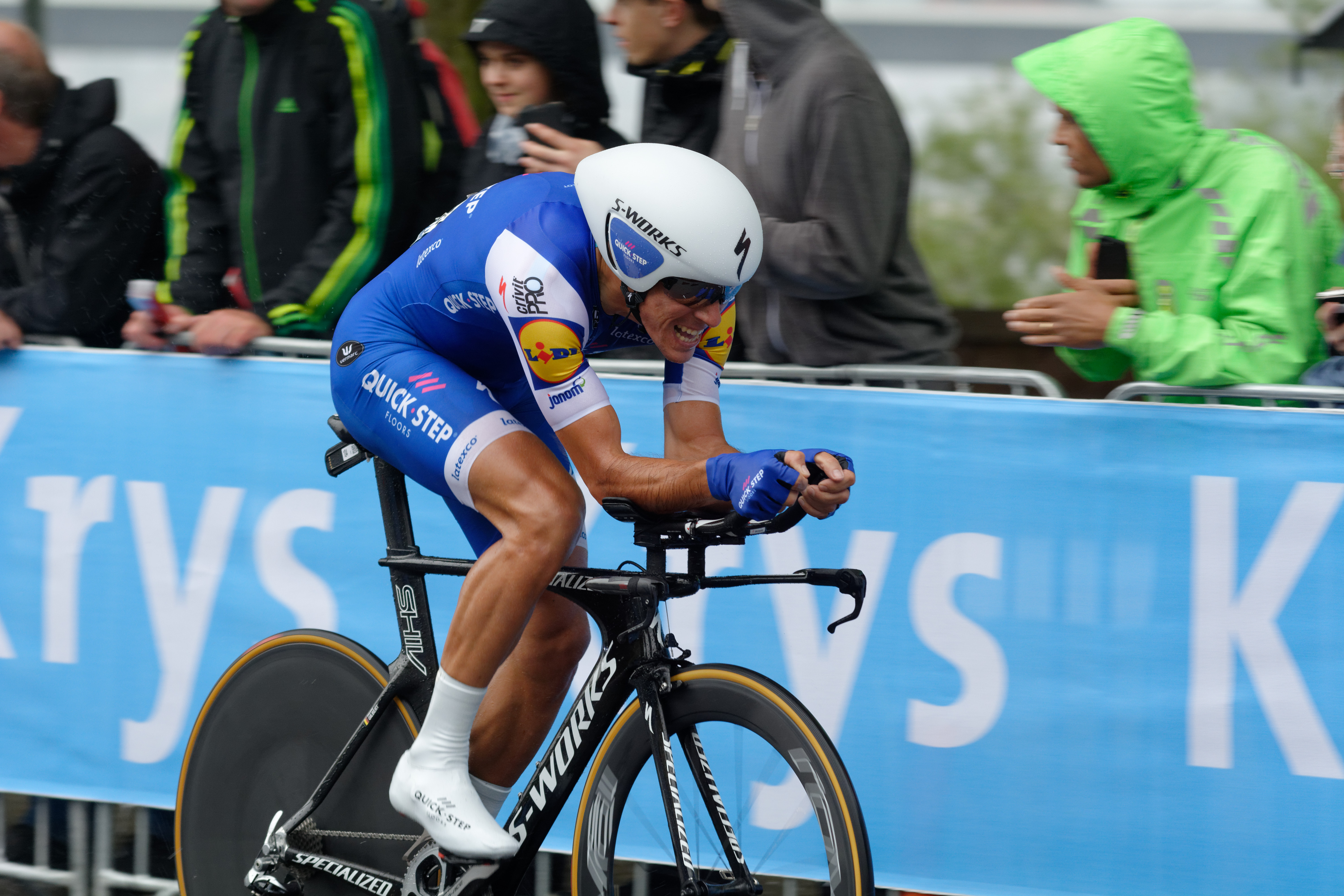
Gilbert at the 2017 Tour de France

After 5 seasons with BMC, Gilbert joined Quick-Step Floors for the 2017 season. Gilbert finished second in the Dwars door Vlaanderen behind teammate Yves Lampaert. The pair made the race-defining split along with Alexey Lutsenko from the Astana team, and Orica–Scott's Luke Durbridge. Lampaert attacked with 7.5 kilometres (4.7 miles) remaining and ultimately won the race by 39 seconds ahead of Gilbert, who led home Lutsenko and Durbridge in a sprint for second place. Later that week, in a three-up sprint finish of Belgian riders, Greg Van Avermaet (BMC Racing Team) won E3 Harelbeke ahead of Gilbert and AG2R La Mondiale's Oliver Naesen. The following week, Gilbert won the Three Days of De Panne after he attacked on the Muur van Geraardsbergen during the race's opening stage and soloed away to the victory by 17 seconds from his nearest competitor. He ultimately won the race by 38 seconds ahead of Trek–Segafredo's Matthias Brändle, and also won the sprints classification, primarily from his opening-day attack.

Three days later, he won the Tour of Flanders after a solo attack on the Oude Kwaremont and holding off the rest of the field over the remaining 55 kilometres (34 mi). Gilbert became the first rider in twenty years to win both the Tour of Flanders and Liège–Bastogne–Liège in his career. Two weeks after that he won the Amstel Gold Race for a fourth time and became the third rider to win the Tour of Flanders and the Amstel Gold Race in the same year, after Jan Raas and Eddy Merckx. It was later revealed that he won the race despite riding for the last 130 kilometres (81 mi) of the race with a minor kidney tear. The injury required treatment in hospital after the race, and ruled him out of La Flèche Wallonne and Liège–Bastogne–Liège.

==== 2018 season ====
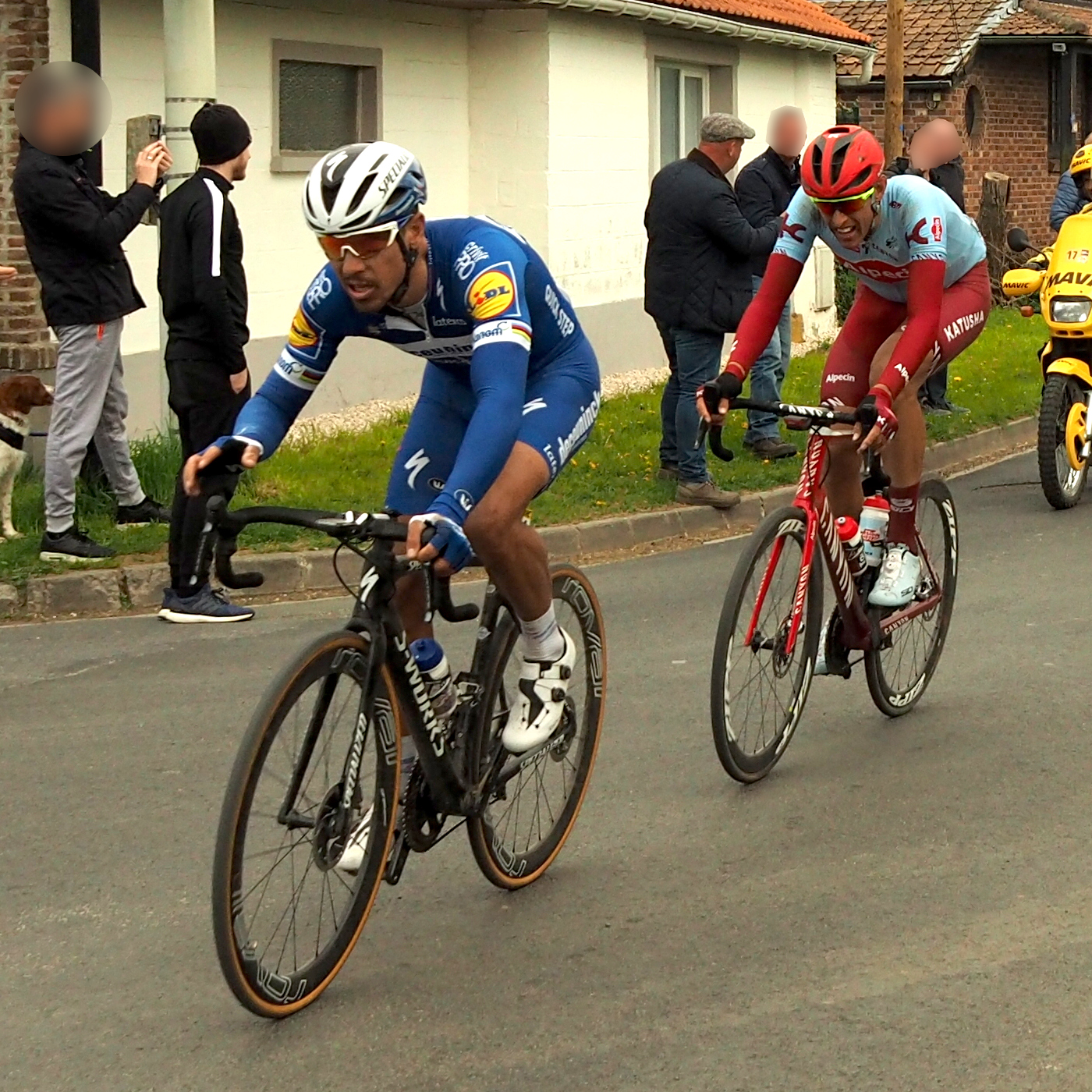
Gilbert leading Nils Politt at the 2019 Paris–Roubaix

In Stage 16 of the Tour de France, Gilbert was involved in a crash in a downhill section where he went over a wall, suffering lacerations and fracturing his kneecap. This was the same road where Fabio Casartelli died in the 1995 Tour de France. Gilbert climbed back onto his bike and rode the remaining 57 kilometres (35 mi) to the finish in Bagnères-de-Luchon, earning him the Most Combative Rider award but ending his tour.

==== 2019 season ====
In April, Gilbert won Paris–Roubaix in a sprint ahead of Nils Politt, thereby raising his total number of monument titles to five. During the Vuelta a España, Gilbert won stage 12 to Bilbao, after dropping his breakaway companions to reach the finish alone. On stage 17 into Guadalajara, Gilbert was again victorious. In a stage marked by crosswinds, his team forced the pace and allowed him to win the sprint finish. The average speed of 50.63 km/h (31.46 mph) marked the fastest ever road stage over 200 km (120 mi) in a Grand Tour.

=== Lotto–Soudal ===
In August 2019, Gilbert signed a three-year contract with the Lotto–Soudal team from the 2020 season onwards.

== Career achievements ==
=== Major results ===
2000
10th Overall Giro della Lunigiana
2002
2nd Road race, National Under-23 Road Championships
2nd Overall Tour du Loir-et-Cher

1st Stage 6

4th Ronde van Vlaanderen U23
5th Overall Le Triptyque des Monts et Châteaux
6th Grand Prix de Waregem
7th Tour du Finistère
8th Circuit de Wallonie
9th Road race, UCI Under-23 Road World Championships
9th La Côte Picarde
2003
2nd Tro-Bro Léon
4th Overall Tour de l'Avenir

1st Points classification
1st Stage 9

6th Overall Driedaagse van West-Vlaanderen
10th Trophée des Grimpeurs
2004 (2 pro wins)
1st Overall Paris–Corrèze
2nd Trophée des Grimpeurs
2nd Paris–Brussels
2nd Grand Prix de Wallonie
3rd Overall Ster Elektrotoer
4th Overall Tour Down Under

1st Stage 3

9th Overall Regio-Tour
2005 (5)
1st French Road Cycling Cup
1st Trophée des Grimpeurs
1st Tour du Haut Var
1st Polynormande
1st Stage 2 Tour Méditerranéen
2nd Grand Prix de Wallonie
6th Milan–San Remo
8th Overall Four Days of Dunkirk

1st Stage 4

8th Grand Prix d'Isbergues
2006 (5)
1st Omloop Het Volk
1st Grand Prix de Wallonie
1st Grand Prix de Fourmies
1st Stage 2 Critérium du Dauphiné Libéré
2nd Road race, National Road Championships
2nd Grand Prix d'Ouverture La Marseillaise
2nd Trophée des Grimpeurs
2nd Le Samyn
2nd Grand Prix d'Isbergues
4th Overall Eneco Tour

1st Stage 7

9th Paris–Bourges
2007 (1)
1st Stage 1 Tour du Limousin
National Road Championships

2nd Time trial
3rd Road race

2nd Le Samyn
3rd Overall Circuit Franco-Belge
5th Overall Volta ao Algarve
7th E3 Prijs Vlaanderen
7th Grand Prix de Plumelec-Morbihan
8th Road race, UCI Road World Championships
10th Boucles de l'Aulne
2008 (5)
1st Overall Vuelta a Mallorca

1st Trofeo Mallorca
1st Trofeo Sóller
3rd Trofeo Pollença
4th Trofeo Cala
4th Trofeo Calvià

1st Paris–Tours
1st Omloop Het Volk
1st Le Samyn
1st Mountains classification, Tour Down Under
2nd Brabantse Pijl
3rd Milan–San Remo
4th Overall Circuit Franco-Belge
5th Tour du Haut Var
6th Paris–Bourges
8th Overall Tour de Picardie
2009 (7)
1st Overall Ster Elektrotoer

1st Stage 4

1st Giro di Lombardia
1st Paris–Tours
1st Gran Piemonte
1st Coppa Sabatini
1st Stage 20 Giro d'Italia
2nd Road race, National Road Championships
3rd Tour of Flanders
4th Amstel Gold Race
4th Liège–Bastogne–Liège
6th Road race, UCI Road World Championships
7th Chrono des Nations
9th UCI World Ranking
9th Brabantse Pijl
2010 (6)
1st Giro di Lombardia
1st Amstel Gold Race
1st Gran Piemonte
Vuelta a España

1st Stages 3 & 19
Held after Stages 3–7

2nd UCI World Ranking
2nd Road race, National Road Championships
3rd Gent–Wevelgem
3rd Tour of Flanders
3rd Liège–Bastogne–Liège
4th Overall Tour of Belgium

1st Stage 1

5th Brabantse Pijl
6th La Flèche Wallonne
7th Overall Tour of Qatar
9th Milan–San Remo
9th Halle–Ingooigem
2011 (18)
1st UCI World Tour
National Road Championships

1st Road race
1st Time trial

1st Overall Tour of Belgium

1st Stage 3

1st Overall Ster ZLM Toer

1st Stage 4

1st Liège–Bastogne–Liège
1st Amstel Gold Race
1st La Flèche Wallonne
1st Clásica de San Sebastián
1st Grand Prix Cycliste de Québec
1st Montepaschi Strade Bianche
1st Brabantse Pijl
1st Grand Prix de Wallonie
Tour de France

1st Stage 1
Held after Stage 1
Held after Stages 1, 2, 5, 6 & 8–10
Held after Stages 1–3

1st Stage 1 Volta ao Algarve
2nd Overall Eneco Tour

1st Stage 3

3rd Milan–San Remo
3rd Grand Prix Cycliste de Montréal
8th Giro di Lombardia
9th Overall Tirreno–Adriatico

1st Stage 5

9th Tour of Flanders
2012 (3)
UCI Road World Championships

1st Road race
2nd Team time trial

Vuelta a España

1st Stages 9 & 19

3rd Time trial, National Road Championships
3rd La Flèche Wallonne
6th Amstel Gold Race
7th Overall Tour of Belgium
2013 (1)
1st Stage 12 Vuelta a España
2nd Time trial, National Road Championships
2nd Brabantse Pijl
3rd Overall Tour of Belgium
5th Amstel Gold Race
5th Grand Prix d'Isbergues
7th Liège–Bastogne–Liège
9th Road race, UCI Road World Championships
10th Grand Prix de Wallonie
2014 (7)
1st Overall Ster ZLM Toer

1st Prologue & Stage 3

1st Overall Tour of Beijing

1st Stage 2

1st Brabantse Pijl
1st Amstel Gold Race
1st Mountains classification, Tour de Picardie
3rd Classic Sud-Ardèche
4th Time trial, National Road Championships
4th Overall Tour of Belgium

1st Points classification

4th London–Surrey Classic
6th Grand Prix of Aargau Canton
7th Road race, UCI Road World Championships
7th Overall Eneco Tour
7th Giro di Lombardia
8th Roma Maxima
8th Liège–Bastogne–Liège
9th La Drôme Classic
10th La Flèche Wallonne
2015 (4)
1st Grand Prix Pino Cerami
Giro d'Italia

1st Stages 12 & 18

2nd Overall Tour du Haut Var

1st Points classification

2nd Clásica de San Sebastián
3rd Brabantse Pijl
4th Overall Eneco Tour
7th Overall Tour de Wallonie

1st Stage 3

7th Grand Prix Cycliste de Québec
8th Overall Dubai Tour
8th Omloop Het Nieuwsblad
9th Grand Prix Cycliste de Montréal
10th Road race, UCI Road World Championships
10th Amstel Gold Race
2016 (4)
1st Road race, National Road Championships
1st Vuelta a Murcia
2nd Overall Tour de Luxembourg

1st Points classification
1st Stages 2 & 4

3rd Volta Limburg Classic
6th Overall Dubai Tour
6th Tre Valli Varesine
6th Gran Piemonte
8th Road race, UEC European Road Championships
8th Overall Arctic Race of Norway
2017 (5)
1st Overall Three Days of De Panne

1st Sprints classification
1st Stage 1

1st Tour of Flanders
1st Amstel Gold Race
1st Stage 2 Tour de Suisse
1st Combination classification, Volta a la Comunitat Valenciana
2nd Dwars door Vlaanderen
2nd E3 Harelbeke
4th Overall Tour of Belgium
9th Overall BinckBank Tour
Combativity award Stage 5 Tour de France
2018 (1)
1st Grand Prix d'Isbergues
2nd Road race, National Road Championships
2nd Le Samyn
2nd E3 Harelbeke
3rd Tour of Flanders
3rd Vuelta a Murcia
5th Omloop Het Nieuwsblad
8th Paris–Tours
Combativity award Stage 16 Tour de France
2019 (4)
1st Paris–Roubaix
Vuelta a España

1st Stages 12 & 17
Combativity award Stage 12

3rd Halle–Ingooigem
4th Road race, National Road Championships
8th Omloop Het Nieuwsblad
10th Overall Tour de la Provence

1st Stage 3

2020
8th Omloop Het Nieuwsblad
9th Milan–San Remo
2021
4th Brussels Cycling Classic
5th Omloop Het Nieuwsblad
9th Druivenkoers Overijse
2022 (2)
1st Overall Four Days of Dunkirk

1st Stage 3

6th Binche–Chimay–Binche
8th Tour du Doubs
10th Volta Limburg Classic

==== Grand Tour general classification results timeline ====
Grand Tour	2004	2005	2006	2007	2008	2009	2010	2011	2012	2013	2014	2015	2016	2017	2018	2019	2020	2021	2022
Giro d'Italia	32	—	DNF	—	—	97	—	—	—	—	—	39	—	—	—	—	—	—	—
Tour de France	—	70	110	DNF	112	—	—	38	46	62	—	—	—	DNF	DNF	—	DNF	99	76
/ Vuelta a España	—	—	—	69	DNF	54	50	—	59	DNF	45	—	DNF	—	—	32	—	—	—

Legend
—	Did not compete
DNF	Did not finish

==== Classics results ====
This table shows Gilbert's results in the great classics.

Monument	2003	2004	2005	2006	2007	2008	2009	2010	2011	2012	2013	2014	2015	2016	2017	2018	2019	2020	2021	2022
Milan–San Remo	—	14	6	32	21	3	23	9	3	87	32	13	55	—	29	75	68	9	72	144
Tour of Flanders	DNF	—	—	DNF	25	15	3	3	9	75	—	—	—	—	1	3	DNF	—	—	—
Paris–Roubaix	—	—	—	—	52	—	—	—	—	—	—	—	—	—	—	15	1	NH	29	30
Liège–Bastogne–Liège	DNF	40	DNF	38	16	92	4	3	1	16	7	8	36	—	—	31	58	—	102	46
Giro di Lombardia	—	—	74	DNF	—	—	1	1	8	DNF	20	7	33	34	27	—	54	—	—	—
Classic	2003	2004	2005	2006	2007	2008	2009	2010	2011	2012	2013	2014	2015	2016	2017	2018	2019	2020	2021	2022
Omloop Het Nieuwsblad	—	NH	21	1	11	1	15	26	43	31	—	—	8	DNF	13	5	8	8	5	40
Kuurne–Brussels–Kuurne	17	—	—	—	—	—	—	—	—	—	NH	—	49	—	61	—	—	—	—	—
Strade Bianche	Race did not exist				—	—	—	—	1	48	—	—	—	—	—	36	—	25	—	—
E3 Harelbeke	—	—	—	DNF	7	—	—	—	—	DNF	48	—	—	—	2	2	11	NH	DNF	—
Gent–Wevelgem	—	—	—	29	45	62	—	3	36	39	42	—	—	—	—	17	22	—	DNF	—
Dwars door Vlaanderen	—	76	—	—	—	—	—	—	—	—	—	—	—	—	2	—	DNF	NH	—	—
Brabantse Pijl	—	—	—	—	DNF	2	9	5	1	12	2	1	3	—	15	—	—	—	—	DNF
Amstel Gold Race	—	34	—	69	—	29	4	1	1	6	5	1	10	81	1	13	30	NH	—	58
La Flèche Wallonne	—	69	—	21	19	DNF	35	6	1	3	15	10	DNF	91	—	24	—	—	70	—
London–Surrey Classic	Race did not exist								—	—	—	4	16	—	—	—	59	Not held		
Hamburg Cyclassics	—	13	—	31	80	—	49	33	—	—	—	—	30	—	—	—	—	Not held		—
Clásica de San Sebastián	—	—	43	—	84	DNF	—	43	1	—	27	DNF	2	58	DNF	—	—	NH	—	—
Grand Prix de Fourmies	—	36	18	1	—	—	—	—	—	—	—	—	—	—	—	—	—	NH	—	—
Bretagne Classic	—	22	13	22	—	—	19	43	57	—	—	—	51	—	43	—	—	—	—	18
Grand Prix Cycliste de Québec	Race did not exist							—	1	—	—	—	7	—	—	—	—	Not held		—
Grand Prix Cycliste de Montréal	Race did not exist							—	3	—	—	—	9	—	—	—	—	Not held		—
Brussels Cycling Classic	—	2	—	—	—	—	—	—	—	—	—	—	—	—	—	—	—	—	4	—
Giro dell'Emilia	—	—	—	—	—	—	—	—	—	—	—	—	—	39	—	—	—	—	—	—
Milano–Torino	—	—	—	—	—	Not held				—	—	—	—	—	69	—	34	72	—	—
Gran Piemonte	—	—	—	—	NH	—	1	1	DNF	—	Not held		—	6	—	—	—	—	—	—
Paris–Tours	33	12	25	13	27	1	1	63	67	—	—	—	—	—	—	8	—	—	—	27

Legend
—	Did not compete
DNF	Did not finish
NH	Not held

==== Major championships timeline ====
Event		2003	2004	2005	2006	2007	2008	2009	2010	2011	2012	2013	2014	2015	2016	2017	2018	2019	2020	2021	2022
Olympic Games	Time trial	NH	—	Not held			—	Not held			17	Not held			—	Not held				—	NH
Olympic Games	Road race	NH	49	Not held			—	Not held			19	Not held			42	Not held				—	NH
World Championships	Road race	DNF	DNF	77	92	8	15	6	18	17	1	9	7	10	—	17	—	DNF	—	—	—
World Championships	Team time trial (Note: In 2012, Gilbert was part of the BMC Racing Team that contested the race. In 2017, he contested the event with Quick-Step Floors.)	Not Held									2	—	—	—	—	4	—	Not held			
European Championships	Road race	Race did not exist													8	—	—	—	—	DNF	—
National Championships	Time trial	8	—	—	—	2	6	—	—	1	3	2	4	—	11	—	—	—	—	—	—
National Championships	Road race	10	6	—	2	3	24	2	2	1	54	6	44	—	1	40	2	4	22	25	36

Legend
—	Did not compete
DNF	Did not finish
DSQ	Disqualified

== Awards and honours ==
- Crystal Bicycle: 2008, 2009, 2010, 2011
- Sprint d'Or: 2008
- Belgian Sportsman of the year: 2009, 2010, 2011
- Belgian National Sports Merit Award: 2009
- Crystal Bicycle: 2008, 2009, 2010, 2011
- Flandrien Award: 2009, 2010, 2011
- AIJC trophy: 2009
- Walloon-Brussels Sports Merit Award: 2010, 2011, 2012
- Vélo d'Or Mondial: 2011
- Mendrisio d'Or: 2012
- Square Philippe Gilbert in Aywaille: 2013
- La Philippe Gilbert Juniors: an annual cycle race from 2013
- Honorary Citizen of Valkenburg: 2016
- Ruban Jaune: 2019
- CyclingRanking – Overall ranking (12th place)

== Controversies ==
Gilbert was accused of abusing cortisone by an anonymous former Lotto teammate during his dominant period with Omega Pharma–Lotto, an allegation which the Belgian vehemently denies.
