= Óscar Freire =

Spanish cyclist (born 1976)

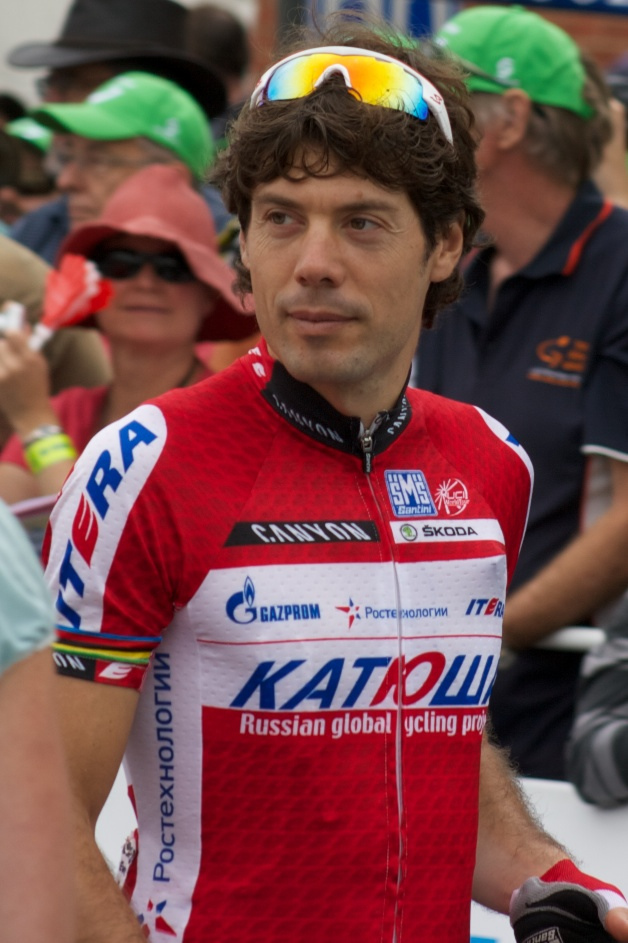
- Freire at the 2012 Tour Down Under

Personal information
- Full name: Óscar Freire Gómez
- Nicknames: The Cat, Oscarito
- Born: 15 February 1976 (age 50) Torrelavega, Spain
- Height: 1.71 m (5 ft 7 1/2 in)
- Weight: 64 kg (141 lb; 10 st 1 lb)

Cycling career
- Sport: Cycling
- Current team: Retired
- Discipline: Road
- Role: Rider
- Rider type: Sprinter, Classics specialist

Amateur teams
- 1995–1996: Ripolin Bondex
- 1997: Pinturas Banaka

Professional teams
- 1998–1999: Vitalicio Seguros
- 2000–2002: Mapei–Quick-Step
- 2003–2011: Rabobank
- 2012: Team Katusha

Major wins
- Grand Tours Tour de France Points classification (2008) 4 individual stages (2002, 2006, 2008) Vuelta a España 7 individual stages (2000, 2004, 2007, 2008) Stage races Tirreno–Adriatico (2005) One-day races and Classics World Road Race Championships (1999, 2001, 2004) Milan–San Remo (2004, 2007, 2010) Gent–Wevelgem (2008) Vattenfall Cyclassics (2006) Paris–Tours (2010) Brabantse Pijl (2005, 2006, 2007)
Medal record
Representing Spain
Men's road bicycle racing
World Championships
Gold medal – first place	1999 Verona	Elite Men's Road Race
Gold medal – first place	2001 Lisbon	Elite Men's Road Race
Gold medal – first place	2004 Verona	Elite Men's Road Race
Silver medal – second place	1997 San Sebastián	Under-23 Men's Road Race
Bronze medal – third place	2000 Plouay	Elite Men's Road Race

Óscar Freire Gómez (born 15 February 1976) is a Spanish former professional road bicycle racer. He was one of the top sprinters in road bicycle racing, having won the World Championship three times, equalling Alfredo Binda, Rik Van Steenbergen, Eddy Merckx and Peter Sagan. In the later years of his career, he became more of a classics rider. He won the cycling monument Milan–San Remo three times, the green jersey and four stages in the Tour de France and seven stages of the Vuelta a España, throughout a successful career.

Despite his diminutive stature, Freire was a world class sprinter. He had a training philosophy where he rode shorter distances than most professional cyclists, sometimes covering only about half the distance his colleagues would. When growing up he contracted tuberculosis and narrowly avoided having a leg amputated.

== Career ==
=== Vitalicio Seguros (1998–1999) ===
Born in Torrelavega, Cantabria, (where the town has named a velodrome in his honour) Freire became professional in 1998 with Vitalicio Seguros. He won one race that year, a stage of the Vuelta a Castilla y León. He came 11th in Paris–Tours.

In 1999, Freire won little until the UCI World Championship Road Race in October. He went to Verona to make up numbers in the Spanish team. He spent his prize on an elevator for his grandmother's apartment. After his victory, as with all his victories, his grandmother sung a regional folk song on his telephone. Prior to winning the World Championships, ONCE had expressed interest in signing him, but following victory his inflated price was too high, meaning that he never rode for a native team again.

=== Mapei–Quick Step (2000–2002) ===
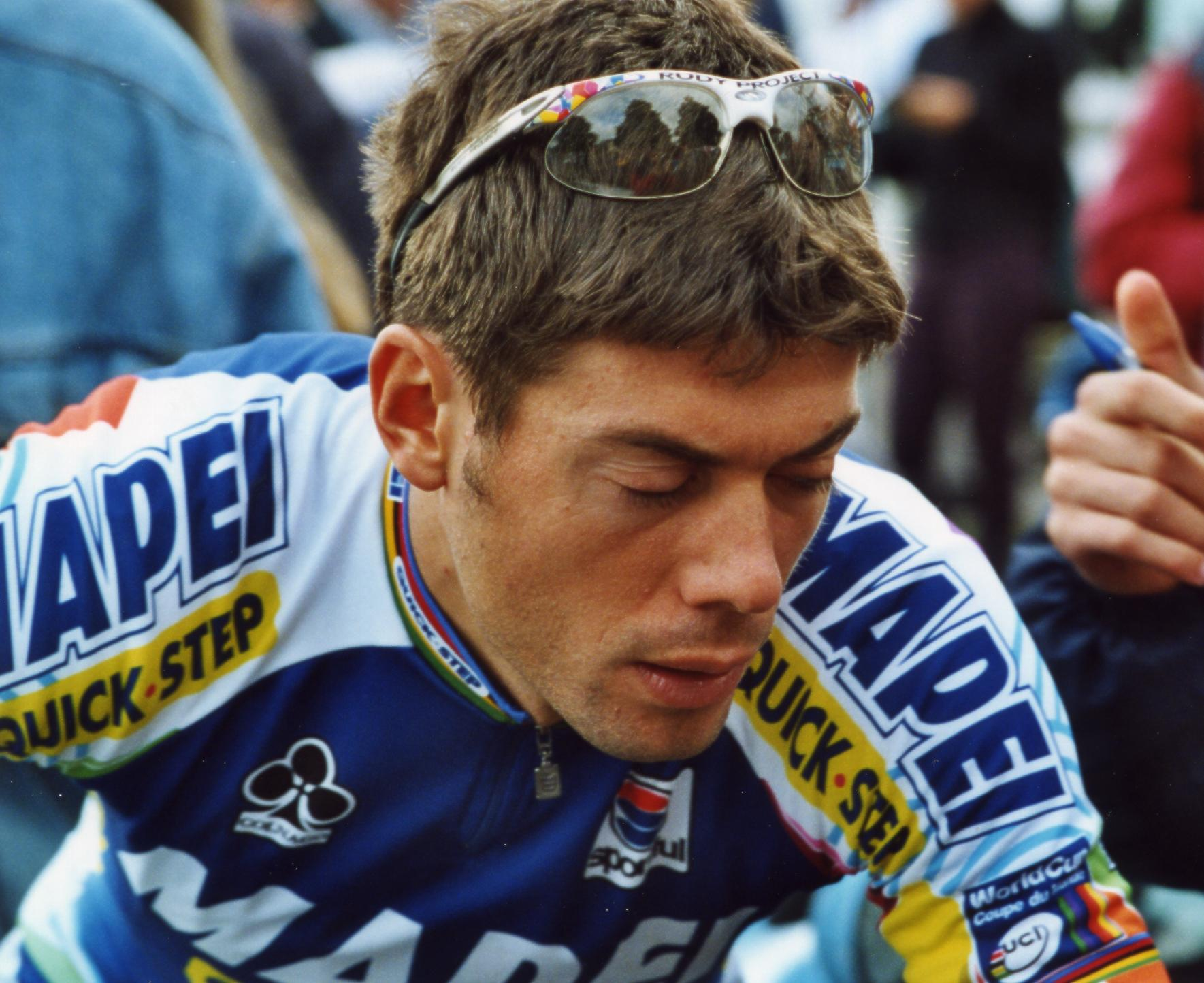
Freire with Mapei at the 2001 Paris-Tours

Freire joined Mapei in 2000. Upon joining the team, he spent his salary on a new family home for his parents and grandmother. It had been ranked best team since 1994. That year he won 11 races including two stages in the Vuelta a España. He also came third place in the UCI World Championship Road Race.

In 2001 he won two races and took the points competition in the Vuelta a Burgos, before becoming world champion for the second time by winning the 2001 UCI Road World Championships – Men's road race in Lisbon.

In 2002 he won a stage in the Tour de France.

=== Rabobank (2003–2011) ===
In 2003, Freire moved to Rabobank, where in his first season he won six races.

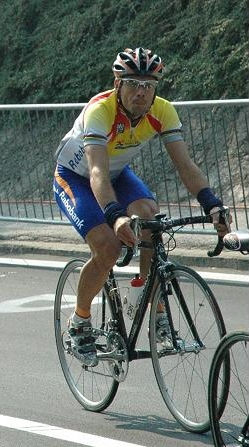
Freire with Rabobank in 2004

In 2004 he won Milan–San Remo, Trofeo Luis Puig, a stage and second place overall in Tirreno–Adriatico, a stage in the Vuelta a España and for the third time, and the second time in Verona, the world championship road race.

He started 2005 winning three stages, the points classification and the yellow jersey at Tirreno–Adriatico, as well as the Brabantse Pijl, Trofeo Alcúdia and Trofeo Mallorca, all before the end of March. His season was then cut short by a saddle sore.

In 2006, Freire won his second consecutive Brabantse Pijl. His stage 3 win at Tirreno–Adriatico allowed him to lead for two days. At the Tour de Suisse, he survived an early break of four riders to win alone on stage 7. Freire won the fifth and ninth stages in the 2006 Tour de France and was contesting the points classification when he retired due to illness. During stage twelve, he was in a breakaway with three others. Freire's career has been blighted with injury and lay-offs. He had back problems, saddle sores and neck problems. When Yaroslav Popovych, riding for the Discovery Channel Pro Cycling Team, rode away for victory, rumours spread that Freire had been ordered by Rabobank not to ride for the victory, to secure help from the Discovery Team in the mountains. Although rumours were denied by both teams, Freire was upset after the stage. Freire continued his successful year by winning the Vattenfall Cyclassics ahead of German favourite Erik Zabel. Freire had half of Rabobank's victories in 2006. His season was cut short by neck and spinal injuries, forcing him to miss the Vuelta a España and world championship.

Freire re-signed for Rabobank in late 2006 until the end of 2008, rejecting Saunier Duval–Prodir.

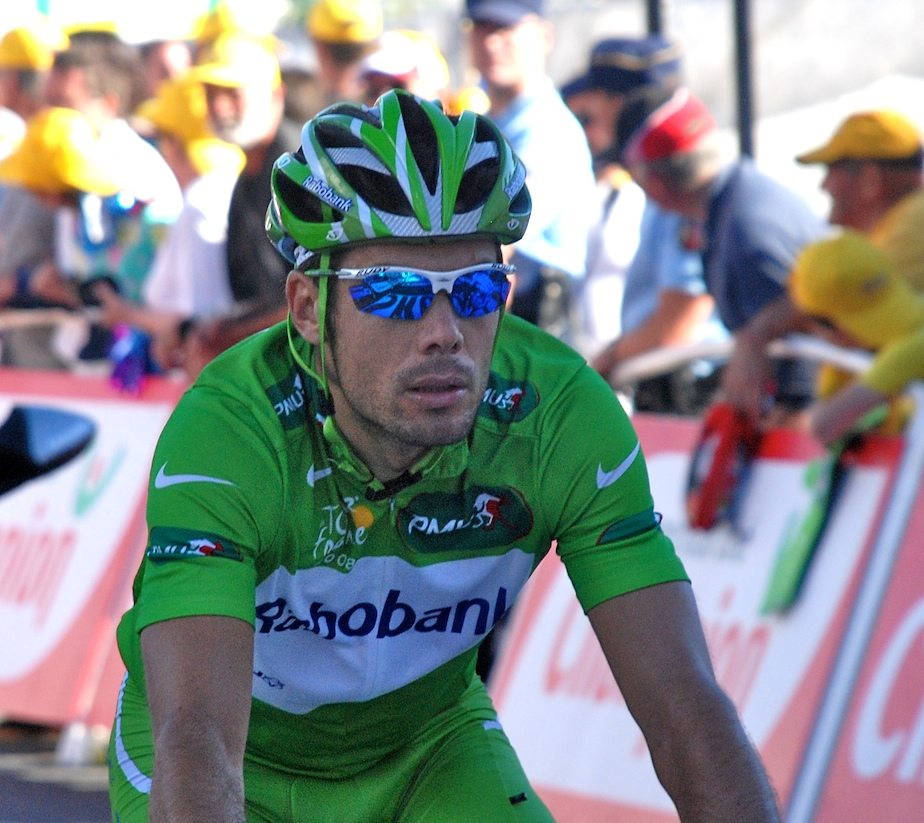
Freire at the 2008 Tour de France, wearing the Points classification in the Tour de France

In the 2007 Tour de France, he did not win a stage, partly because Rabobank was defending Michael Rasmussen's lead for a large part of the race. But he won three stages in the Vuelta a España.

In the 2008 Tour, Freire wore the green jersey from stage 8. He won stage 14 and the points classification.

In the 2009 Tour he and Julian Dean were shot by an air rifle during the 13th stage from Vittel to Colmar. He was shot in the thigh and finished the stage 117th.

In March 2010, Freire won the 2010 Milan–San Remo in front of Tom Boonen and Alessandro Petacchi. On 10 October 2010 Freire became the first Spaniard to win Paris–Tours and in doing so became the new holder of the Ruban Jaune for setting the fastest average speed in a classic race, he covered the 233 km at an average of 47.73 km per hour.

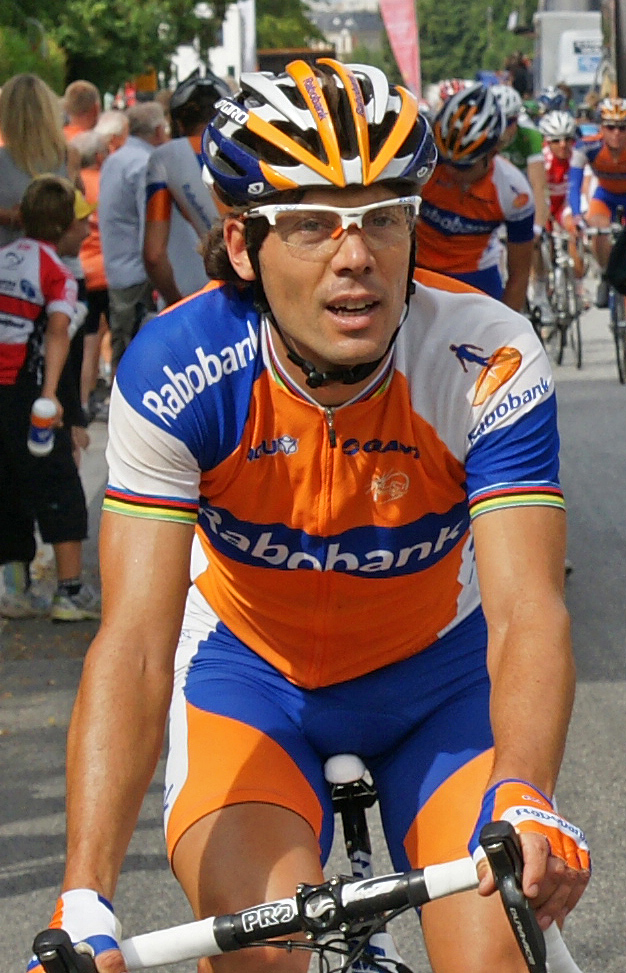
Freire at the 2011 Danmark Rundt

Shortly before the 2011 UCI Road World Championships it was announced that Óscar Freire would retire at the end of the season if he did not win the World Championship road race. Freire ended negotiations to continue his contract with his team before the race, and noted health issues include worsening respiratory problems, having had sinus and nasal surgery in the last two years. He was unable to race the 2011 Tour de France and was forced to abandon the 2011 Vuelta a España.

=== Team Katusha (2012) ===
Initially, Freire planned to finish his career by 2012, but at the end of season 2011 he suddenly changed his mind. While his home Rabobank team, confused by the situation and Oscar's indecision, failed to provide him an extension for another year, Freire had to start talks with other teams. Omega Pharma–Quick-Step, Lotto–Belisol and Geox–TMC expressed their interest to secure his service for season 2012, but Freire chose Team Katusha. He was reported to have been swayed by Team Katusha because the Russian team had a good number of other Spanish riders on its roster along with its well-organised structure and guaranteed entry into WorldTour races.

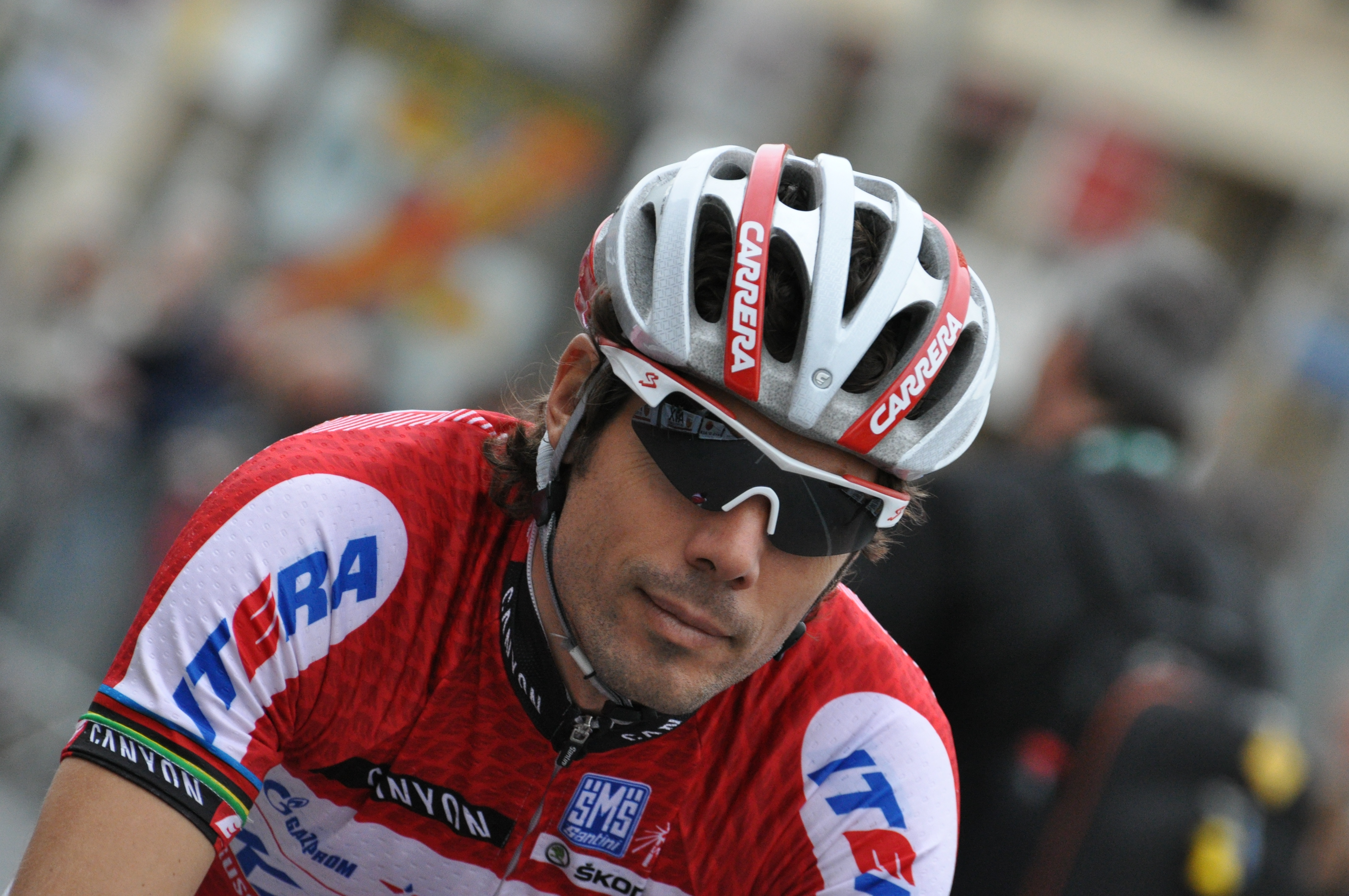
Freire in 2012

By 2012 Freire fully recovered from his previous health problems and managed to show very good results at the first opening races. In January he won stage 3 of Australian Tour Down Under, and then completed his success at stage 3 of Vuelta a Andalucía. At the spring classics Óscar Freire finished 7th at Milan–San Remo, while having taken two second places: one at E3 Harelbeke where he was edged on the line by Tom Boonen (Omega Pharma–Quick-Step) and the other at the Brabantse Pijl, where he dominated the sprint of the chasers after lone escapee Thomas Voeckler of Team Europcar had crossed the line. He then went on to finish 4th in the Amstel Gold Race. He escaped from the lead group with 5 kilometres (3.1 mi) to cover and held an advantage of 18 seconds at the bottom of the final climb, the Cauberg. He was passed in the final meters, but managed to hold on for fourth.

In an interview to the French magazine Velochrono, Freire claimed to take part in the Olympics in London along with the Tour de France and UCI Road World Championships. Freire later admitted that he was contemplating retirement if he didn't win the rainbow jersey, and that he would keep riding for another year or two if he wins the 2012 UCI Championships. He retired from professional cycling at the end of 2012, reportedly refusing a deal from Euskaltel–Euskadi, who would have liked him to race for the 2013 season and then take a post in management. The Basque team was suspected of trying to hoard in Freire's crucial UCI World Tour points, which would help them get a World Tour license for 2013, but the team management denied it. In retirement he went to live, with his family, in Switzerland.

== Personal life ==
His son Marcos Freire is also a professional cyclist.

== Career achievements ==
=== Major results ===
1997
2nd Road race, UCI Road World Under-23 Championships
1998 (1 pro win)
1st Stage 1 Vuelta a Castilla y León
3rd Road race, National Road Championships
3rd Clásica de Almería
3rd Circuito de Getxo
4th GP Villafranca de Ordizia
5th Giro della Romagna
1999 (1)
1st Road race, UCI Road World Championships
2000 (10)
Vuelta a Mallorca

1st Trofeo Palma
4th Trofeo Sóller

Vuelta a España

1st Stages 2 & 4
Held after Stages 4–7

Tirreno–Adriatico

1st Stages 1 & 6

1st Stage 3 Volta a la Comunitat Valenciana
1st Stage 3 Giro della Provincia di Lucca
2nd Trofeo Luis Puig
3rd Road race, UCI Road World Championships
3rd Overall Escalada a Montjuïc

1st Stage 1a

3rd Milan–San Remo
5th Clásica de San Sebastián
6th Züri-Metzgete
8th Overall Vuelta a Aragón

1st Points classification
1st Stages 3 & 4

8th Lancaster Classic
9th Amstel Gold Race
2001 (3)
1st Road race, UCI Road World Championships
Vuelta a Burgos

1st Points classification
1st Stage 5

1st Stage 4 Deutschland Tour
2nd Paris–Tours
2002 (3)
Vuelta a Mallorca

1st Trofeo Manacor
1st Trofeo Sóller

1st Stage 2 Tour de France
3rd Overall Tirreno–Adriatico
4th Rund um den Henninger Turm
5th Milan–San Remo
5th Amstel Gold Race
2003 (7)
1st Overall Giro della Provincia di Lucca

1st Stage 1 & 2

Vuelta a Andalucía

1st Points classification
1st Stage 1 & 2

1st Stage 7 Tirreno–Adriatico
1st Stage 5 Volta a Catalunya
2nd Brabantse Pijl
4th Rund um den Henninger Turm
Vuelta a Mallorca

4th Trofeo Manacor
6th Trofeo Sóller

5th Gran Premio Bruno Beghelli
6th Paris–Brussels
7th Milan–San Remo
8th Overall Ronde van Nederland
9th Road race, UCI Road World Championships
2004 (6)
1st Road race, UCI Road World Championships
1st Milan–San Remo
1st Trofeo Luis Puig
Vuelta a Mallorca

1st Trofeo Alcúdia
2nd Trofeo Palma
3rd Trofeo Calvià

1st Stage 6 Vuelta a España
1st Points classification, Tour de Luxembourg
2nd Overall Tirreno–Adriatico

1st Stage 3

4th HEW Cyclassics
9th Overall Sachsen Tour
9th Züri-Metzgete
2005 (6)
1st Overall Tirreno–Adriatico

1st Points classification
1st Stages 2, 3 & 4

1st Brabantse Pijl
Vuelta a Mallorca

1st Trofeo Alcúdia
1st Trofeo Palma

3rd Trofeo Luis Puig
5th Milan–San Remo
5th La Flèche Wallonne
2006 (7)
1st Brabantse Pijl
1st Vattenfall Cyclassics
1st RaboRonde Heerlen
Tour de France

1st Stages 5 & 9

1st Stage 7 Tour de Suisse
1st Stage 4 Tour of the Basque Country
1st Stage 3 Tirreno–Adriatico
6th Milan–San Remo
2007 (9)
1st Overall Vuelta a Andalucía

1st Points classification
1st Stages 2 & 5

1st Milan–San Remo
1st Brabantse Pijl
Vuelta a Mallorca

1st Trofeo Palma
10th Trofeo Calvià

Vuelta a España

1st Stages 2, 5 & 6
Held after Stages 2–3
Held after Stages 2–9

2nd Vattenfall Cyclassics
3rd Gent–Wevelgem
3rd Paris–Tours
8th Amstel Gold Race
2008 (6)
1st Gent–Wevelgem
Tour de France

1st Points classification
1st Stage 14

Tirreno–Adriatico

1st Points classification
1st Stages 1, 4 & 6

1st Stage 11 Vuelta a España
1st Stage 1 Tour de Suisse
2nd Clásica de Almería
8th Milan–San Remo
2009 (2)
Tour de Romandie

1st Stages 2 & 5

5th Paris–Tours
2010 (7)
1st Milan–San Remo
1st Paris–Tours
Vuelta a Mallorca

1st Trofeo Calla Millor
3rd Trofeo Palma

Tour of the Basque Country

1st Stages 1 & 2

Vuelta a Andalucía

1st Points classification
1st Stages 2 & 3

6th Road race, UCI Road World Championships
8th Overall Tour of Belgium
9th Brabantse Pijl
2011 (2)
Vuelta a Andalucía

1st Points classification
1st Stages 3 & 4

1st Stage 1 (TTT) Tirreno–Adriatico
Vuelta a Mallorca

2nd Trofeo Magaluf-Palmanova

6th Amstel Gold Race
7th Grand Prix de Wallonie
9th Road race, UCI Road World Championships
2012 (2)
1st Stage 4 Tour Down Under
1st Stage 3 Vuelta a Andalucía
2nd E3 Harelbeke
2nd Brabantse Pijl
3rd Paris–Brussels
4th Gent–Wevelgem
4th Amstel Gold Race
7th Milan–San Remo
10th Road race, UCI Road World Championships

=== General classification results timeline ===
Grand Tour general classification results timeline
Grand Tour	1998	1999	2000	2001	2002	2003	2004	2005	2006	2007	2008	2009	2010	2011	2012
Giro d'Italia	Did not contest during his career														
Tour de France	—	—	—	—	DNF	96	—	—	DNF	DNF	68	99	141	—	DNF
/ Vuelta a España	—	—	DNF	DNF	DNF	—	DNF	—	—	DNF	DNF	DNF	DNF	DNF	—
Major stage race general classification results
Race	1998	1999	2000	2001	2002	2003	2004	2005	2006	2007	2008	2009	2010	2011	2012
/ Paris–Nice	Did not contest during his career														
/ Tirreno–Adriatico	—	—	13	—	3	64	2	1	52	29	93	—	52	53	DNF
Volta a Catalunya	—	—	—	—	61	62	—	—	—	—	—	—	—	—	—
Tour of the Basque Country	—	—	—	—	—	—	—	—	37	—	—	59	40	DNF	—
/ Tour de Romandie	—	—	—	—	—	—	—	—	—	—	—	75	—	80	—
Critérium du Dauphiné	—	—	—	—	—	—	OTL	—	—	—	—	—	—	—	—
Tour de Suisse	—	—	—	—	—	—	—	DNF	DNF	DNF	DNF	79	66	DNF	DNF

=== Classics results timeline ===
Monument	1998	1999	2000	2001	2002	2003	2004	2005	2006	2007	2008	2009	2010	2011	2012
Milan–San Remo	—	—	3	—	5	7	1	5	6	1	8	—	1	94	7
Tour of Flanders	—	—	—	—	—	30	23	—	—	49	40	—	—	—	12
Paris–Roubaix	DNF	—	—	—	—	—	—	—	—	—	—	—	—	—	—
Liège–Bastogne–Liège	—	—	—	—	22	35	14	96	14	77	11	14	—	15	24
Giro di Lombardia	—	—	13	21	26	49	—	—	—	DNF	—	—	DNF	—	—
Classic	1998	1999	2000	2001	2002	2003	2004	2005	2006	2007	2008	2009	2010	2011	2012
E3 Harelbeke	—	—	—	—	—	23	13	DNF	—	12	56	—	—	—	2
Gent–Wevelgem	—	—	—	—	—	38	—	—	—	3	1	—	12	—	4
Brabantse Pijl	—	—	—	—	—	2	—	1	1	1	37	—	9	11	2
Amstel Gold Race	45	—	9	—	5	14	14	10	17	8	19	64	14	6	4
La Flèche Wallonne	—	—	—	—	19	51	32	5	75	11	33	58	88	—	83
Züri-Metzgete	—	—	6	—	—	—	9	—	—	Race did not exist					
Clásica de San Sebastián	72	—	5	—	11	83	11	—	—	—	—	—	—	72	—
Hamburg Cyclassics	—	—	13	—	25	—	4	—	1	2	—	—	—	—	—
Paris–Tours	11	—	44	2	11	42	3	—	—	2	18	5	1	20	—

=== Major championships results timeline ===
	1998	1999	2000	2001	2002	2003	2004	2005	2006	2007	2008	2009	2010	2011	2012
World Championships	17	1	3	1	156	9	1	—	—	14	38	15	6	9	10
National Championships	3	—	—	—	62	—	—	—	—	—	—	—	—	—	—

Legend
—	Did not compete
DNF	Did not finish
