= Pleuni =

Pleuni is a given name. Notable people with the given name include:

- Pleuni Cornelisse (born 1999), Dutch judoka
- Pleuni Möhlmann (born 1984), Dutch road cyclist
- Pleuni Touw (born 1938), Dutch actress
