= 2001 UCI Road World Championships – Men's road race =

Men's Individual Road Race
2001 UCI Road World Championships
- Rainbow jersey

Race details
- Dates: 14 October 2001
- Stages: 1
- Distance: 254.1 km (157.9 mi)
- Winning time: 6h 07' 21"

Results
	Winner	Óscar Freire (ESP)	(Spain)
	Second	Paolo Bettini (ITA)	(Italy)
	Third	Andrej Hauptman (SLO)	(Slovenia)

The men's road race at the 2001 UCI Road World Championships was the 68th edition of the event. The race took place on Sunday 14 October 2001 in Lisbon, Portugal on a 12.1 km (7.5 mi) circuit. The race was won by Óscar Freire of Spain.

== Final classification ==
General classification (1–10)

Rank	Rider	Time
1st place, gold medalist(s)	Óscar Freire (ESP)	6h 07' 21"
2nd place, silver medalist(s)	Paolo Bettini (ITA)	+ 0"
3rd place, bronze medalist(s)	Andrej Hauptman (SLO)	+ 0"
4	Erik Dekker (NED)	+ 0"
5	Erik Zabel (GER)	+ 0"
6	Piotr Wadecki (POL)	+ 0"
7	Giuliano Figueras (ITA)	+ 0"
8	Gennady Mikhaylov (RUS)	+ 0"
9	Tomáš Konečný (CZE)	+ 0"
10	Beat Zberg (SUI)	+ 0"
