= 2006 Brabantse Pijl =

Race details
- Dates: 26 March 2006
- Stages: 1
- Distance: 190 km (118.1 mi)
- Winning time: 4h 23' 00"

Results
| | Winner | Óscar Freire (ESP) |
| | Second | Karsten Kroon (NED) |
| | Third | Nick Nuyens (BEL) |

The 2006 Brabantse Pijl was the 46th edition of the Brabantse Pijl cycle race and was held on 26 March 2006. The race started in Zaventem and finished in Alsemberg. The race was won by Óscar Freire.

== General classification ==
Final general classification

| Rank | Rider | Time |
|---|---|---|
| 1 | Óscar Freire (ESP) | 4h 23' 00" |
| 2 | Karsten Kroon (NED) | + 0" |
| 3 | Nick Nuyens (BEL) | + 0" |
| 4 | Juan Antonio Flecha (ESP) | + 3" |
| 5 | Marcus Ljungqvist (SWE) | + 34" |
| 6 | Igor Abakoumov (BEL) | + 34" |
| 7 | Kurt Asle Arvesen (NOR) | + 34" |
| 8 | Erik Zabel (GER) | + 34" |
| 9 | Matteo Carrara (ITA) | + 34" |
| 10 | Sébastien Hinault (FRA) | + 34" |
