= 1997 UCI Road World Championships – Men's under-23 road race =

Cycling race

Rainbow jersey

The 1997 UCI Road World Championships - Men's Under-23 Road Race took place on October 11, 1997, in the Spanish city of San Sebastián. The race was won by Kurt Asle Arvesen of Norway.

== Results ==
October 11, 1997: San Sebastian

Rank	Cyclist	Time
1	Kurt Asle Arvesen (NOR)	3h 46'28"
2	Óscar Freire (ESP)	s.t.
3	Gerrit Glomser (AUT)	s.t.
4	René Haselbacher (AUT)	
5	Andrej Hauptman (SLO)	
6	Danilo Di Luca (ITA)	
7	Francisco Mancebo (ESP)	
8	Sergej Borodoulin (BLR)	
9	Salvatore Commesso (ITA)	
10	Raivis Belohvoščiks (LAT)	
