= 2012 Brabantse Pijl =

- Event poster with previous winner Philippe Gilbert

Race details
- Dates: 11 April 2012
- Stages: 1
- Distance: 195.2 km (121.3 mi)
- Winning time: 4h 49' 01"

Results
	Winner	Thomas Voeckler (FRA)
	Second	Óscar Freire (ESP)
	Third	Pieter Serry (BEL)

The 2012 Brabantse Pijl was the 52nd edition of the Brabantse Pijl cycle race and was held on 11 April 2012. The race started in Leuven and finished in Overijse. The race was won by Thomas Voeckler.

== General classification ==
Final general classification

Rank	Rider	Time
1	Thomas Voeckler (FRA)	4h 49' 01"
2	Óscar Freire (ESP)	+ 1' 11"
3	Pieter Serry (BEL)	+ 1' 11"
4	Fabio Duarte (COL)	+ 1' 14"
5	Greg Van Avermaet (BEL)	+ 1' 17"
6	Alex Howes (USA)	+ 1' 17"
7	Jelle Vanendert (BEL)	+ 1' 17"
8	Dries Devenyns (BEL)	+ 1' 17"
9	Laurens ten Dam (NED)	+ 1' 27"
10	Michael Matthews (AUS)	+ 1' 54"
