= 1999 UCI Road World Championships – Men's road race =

Men's Individual Road Race
1999 UCI Road World Championships
- Rainbow jersey

Race details
- Dates: October 10, 1999
- Stages: 1
- Distance: 260 km (160 mi)
- Winning time: 06h 19' 29"

Medalists
	Gold	Óscar Freire (ESP)	(Spain)
	Silver	Marcus Zberg (SUI)	(Switzerland)
	Bronze	Jean-Cyril Robin (FRA)	(France)

These are the results for the 1999 UCI Road World Championships bicycle race road race. The men's elite race was held on Sunday, October 10, 1999, in Verona, Italy, over a total distance of 260 kilometres (16 laps). There were a total number of 172 starters, with 49 cyclists finishing the race.

Spanish cyclist Óscar Freire secured his first World Championship title in the men's elite road race, completing the 260-kilometre course in 6 hours, 19 minutes, and 29 seconds. He was followed by Swiss rider Markus Zberg in second place and Frenchman Jean-Cyril Robin in third.

== Final classification ==
Rank	Rider	Time
1st place, gold medalist(s)	Óscar Freire (ESP)	06:19:29
2nd place, silver medalist(s)	Markus Zberg (SUI)	—
3rd place, bronze medalist(s)	Jean-Cyril Robin (FRA)	—
4.	Francesco Casagrande (ITA)	—
5.	Chann McRae (USA)	—
6.	Oscar Camenzind (SUI)	—
7.	Frank Vandenbroucke (BEL)	—
8.	Jan Ullrich (GER)	—
9.	Dimitri Konyshev (RUS)	—
10.	Daniele Nardello (ITA)	+ 00.59
11.	Andrea Tafi (ITA)	—
12.	Johan Museeuw (BEL)	—
13.	Rolf Sørensen (DEN)	—
14.	Michael Boogerd (NED)	—
15.	Marco Serpellini (ITA)	+ 01.08
16.	Beat Zberg (SUI)	+ 01.09
17.	Piotr Wadecki (POL)	—
18.	Pavel Tonkov (RUS)	—
19.	Maarten den Bakker (NED)	—
20.	Pascal Richard (SUI)	—
21.	Marco Velo (ITA)	—
22.	Niki Aebersold (SUI)	—
23.	Christophe Moreau (FRA)	—
24.	Santiago Blanco (ESP)	—
25.	Mirko Celestino (ITA)	+ 01.26
26.	Raimondas Rumšas (LTU)	+ 01.43
27.	Mauro Gianetti (SUI)	+ 02.40
28.	Miguel Ángel Martín (ESP)	+ 04.16
29.	Romans Vainsteins (LAT)	+ 08.02
30.	Gianni Faresin (ITA)	+ 08.15
31.	Zbigniew Piątek (POL)	—
32.	Manuel Beltrán (ESP)	—
33.	Glenn Magnusson (SWE)	—
34.	Laurent Brochard (FRA)	—
35.	Felice Puttini (SUI)	+ 08.17
36.	José Luis Rubiera (ESP)	+ 08.18
37.	Roberto Laiseka (ESP)	—
38.	Massimo Donati (ITA)	—
39.	Mauro Zanetti (ITA)	—
40.	Peter Farazijn (BEL)	—
41.	Andrei Tchmil (BEL)	—
42.	Raivis Belohvoščiks (LAT)	+ 16.01
43.	Íñigo Chaurreau (ESP)	—
44.	Nicki Sørensen (DEN)	—
45.	Gorazd Štangelj (SLO)	—
46.	Georg Totschnig (AUT)	—
47.	Andrei Kivilev (KAZ)	—
48.	Marc Lotz (NED)	—
49.	Sergey Lelekin (RUS)	—
