= Andrej Hauptman =

Slovenian cyclist

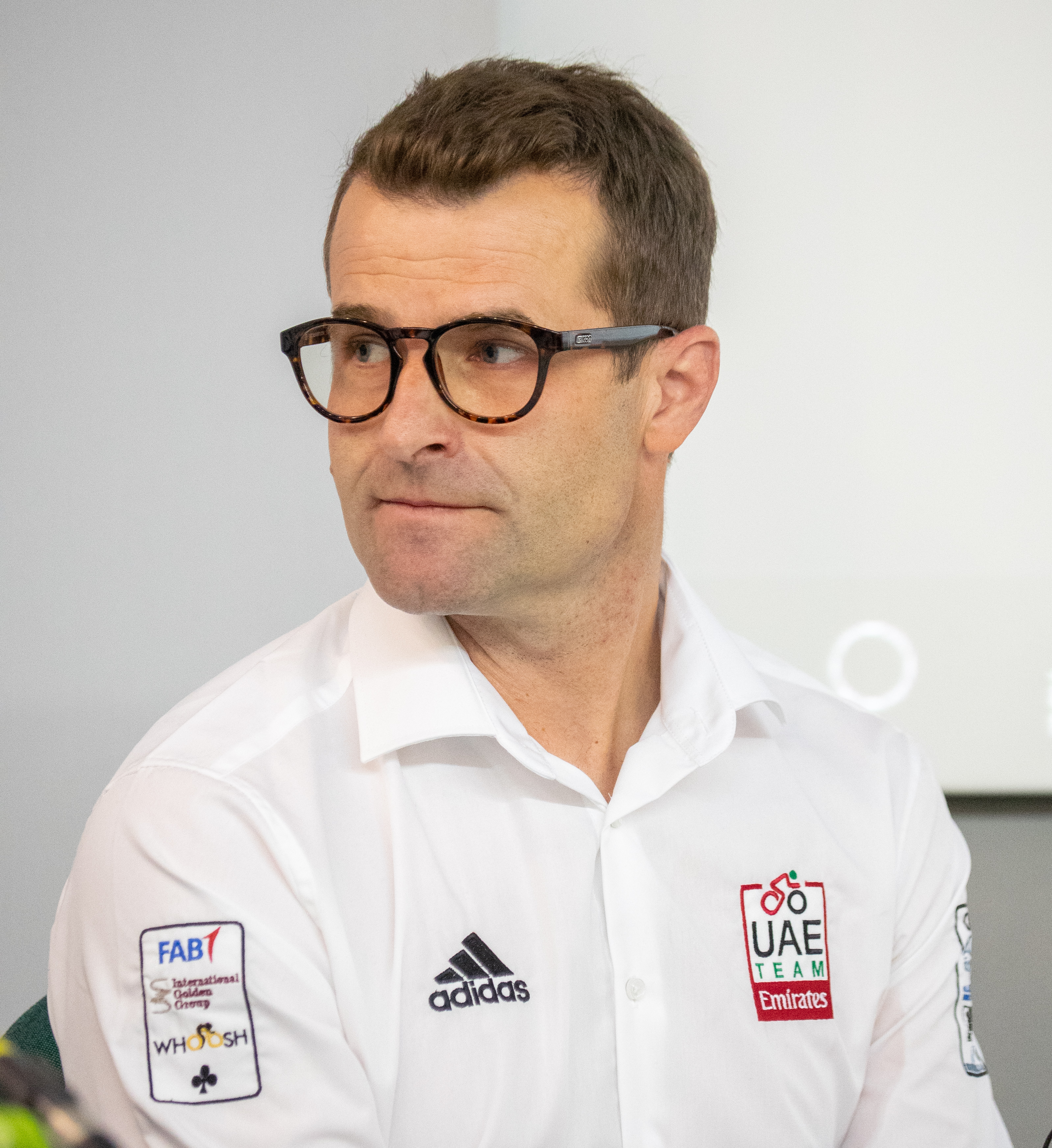
- Andrej Hauptman as directeur sportif of UAE Team Emirates (2022 Tour of Slovenia Press conference)

Personal information
- Full name: Andrej Hauptman
- Born: 5 May 1975 (age 51) Ljubljana, Slovenia

Cycling career
- Sport: Cycling
- Discipline: Road
- Role: Rider; Directeur sportif

Professional teams
- 1999–2003: Vini Caldirola
- 2004: Lampre
- 2005: Fassa Bortolo
- 2006: Radenska–PowerBar
Medal record
Representing Slovenia
Men's road bicycle racing
World Championships
Bronze medal – third place	2001 Lisbon	Elite Men's Road Race

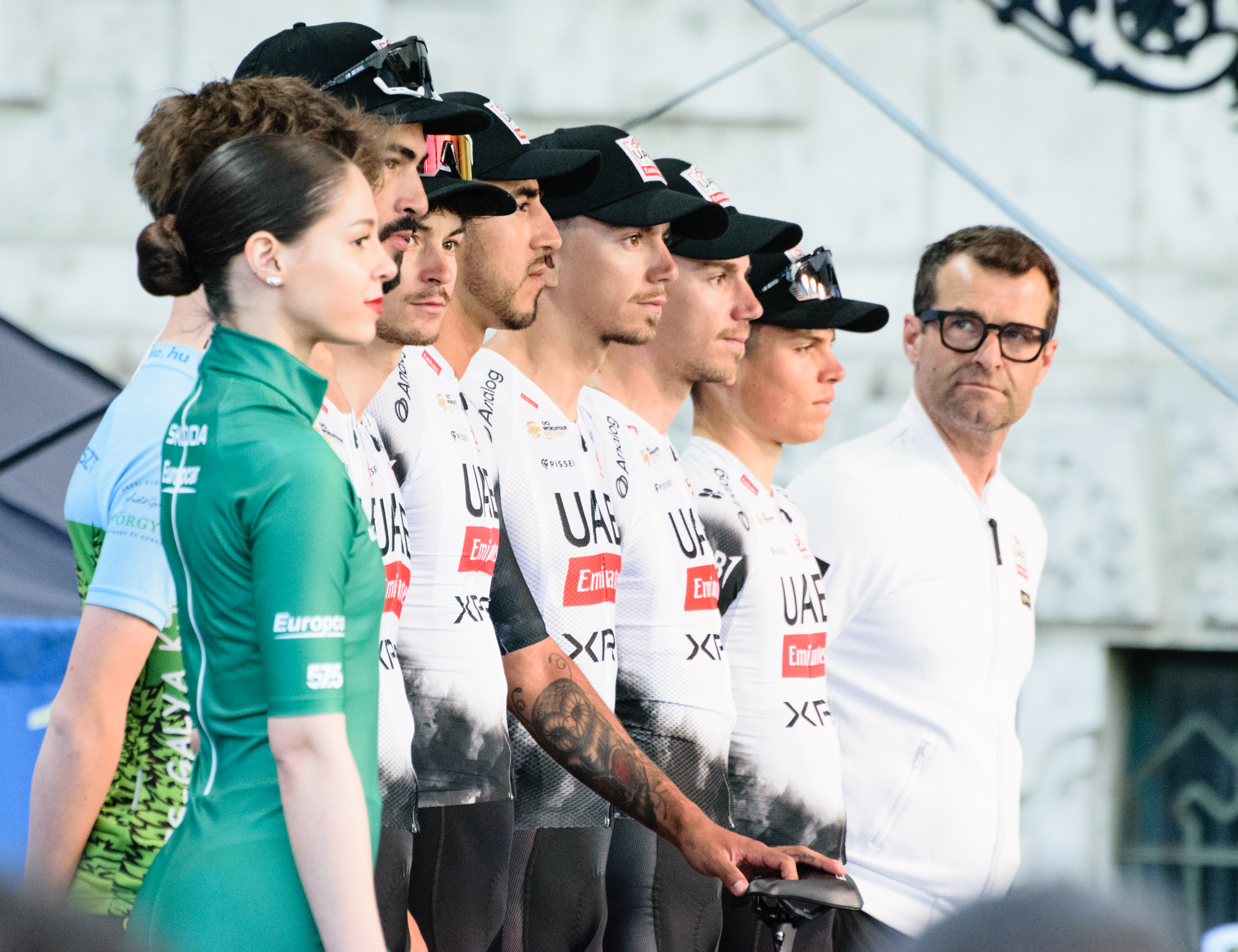
Hauptman (on the right) at the 2025 Tour de Hongrie team presentation

Andrej Hauptman (born 5 May 1975) is a Slovenian former professional road racing cyclist. In 2001 he became the first Slovenian rider to take a world championship medal in cycling when he won the bronze in the road race at the Road World Championships. After retiring from competition, he became a cycling coach: he is coach of fellow Slovenian cyclist Tadej Pogačar and also serves as head coach and head of selectors for the Slovenian national cycling team. He formerly managed Pogi Team Gusto Ljubljana, where as well as guiding Pogačar through his under-23 career he coached Primož Roglič when the latter switched from ski jumping to cycling and rode for the team's development squad. In May 2019 Hauptman joined UAE Team Emirates as a directeur sportif after Pogačar joined the team.

== Major results ==
1997
5th Road race, UCI Under-23 Road World Championships
1998
1st Overall Okolo Slovenska

1st Stage 6

Tour de Slovénie

1st Stages 2 & 7

1st Stage 1 Tour of Austria
1999
8th Grand Prix Pino Cerami
2000
1st Road race, National Road Championships
1st Grand Prix de Fourmies
3rd Ronde van Midden-Zeeland
9th Classic Haribo
2001
1st Overall Istrian Spring Trophy

1st Stage 3

3rd Road race, UCI Road World Championships
5th HEW Cyclassics
5th Paris–Tours
7th E3 Prijs Vlaanderen
2002
4th Road race, UCI Road World Championships
4th Grand Prix of Aargau Canton
9th Grand Prix Pino Cerami
2004
5th Road race, Olympic Games
9th HEW Cyclassics
10th Grand Prix Pino Cerami
