= 2008 Gent–Wevelgem =

2008 UCI ProTour, race 4 of 15

Race details
- Dates: 9 April 2008
- Stages: 1
- Distance: 209 km (130 mi)
- Winning time: 5h 01' 35"

Results
	Winner	Óscar Freire (ESP)	(Rabobank)
	Second	Aurélien Clerc (SUI)	(Bouygues Télécom)
	Third	Wouter Weylandt (BEL)	(Quick-Step)

The 70th Gent–Wevelgem was a road cycling race that took place between Deinze and Wevelgem in Belgium on 9 April 2008. Spaniard Óscar Freire of the Rabobank team won in a tightly contested bunch sprint and beat Swiss racer Aurélien Clerc who finished a close second.

== Results ==
	Cyclist	Team	Time	UCI ProTour Points
1	Óscar Freire (ESP)	Rabobank	5h 01' 35"	40
2	Aurélien Clerc (SUI)	Bouygues Télécom	s.t.	30
3	Wouter Weylandt (BEL)	Quick-Step	s.t.	25
4	Erik Zabel (GER)	Team Milram	s.t.	20
5	Kenny Dehaes (BEL)	Topsport Vlaanderen	s.t.	N/A
6	Luca Paolini (ITA)	Acqua & Sapone–Caffè Mokambo	s.t.	N/A
7	José Joaquín Rojas (ESP)	Caisse d'Epargne	s.t.	7
8	Stuart O'Grady (AUS)	Team CSC	s.t.	5
9	Heinrich Haussler (GER)	Gerolsteiner	s.t.	3
10	Roger Hammond (UK)	Team High Road	s.t.	1

== Individual 2008 UCI ProTour standings after race ==
Rank	Previous Rank	Name	Team	Points
1	1	André Greipel (GER)	Team High Road	62
2	2	Stijn Devolder (BEL)	Quick-Step	50
3	4	José Joaquín Rojas (ESP)	Caisse d'Epargne	45
4	-	Óscar Freire (ESP)	Rabobank	40
5	3	Nick Nuyens (BEL)	Cofidis	40
6	5	Juan Antonio Flecha (ESP)	Rabobank	35
7	-	Aurélien Clerc (SUI)	Bouygues Télécom	30
8	6	Alessandro Ballan (ITA)	Lampre	30
9	7	Mickaël Delage (FRA)	Française des Jeux	30
10	-	Wouter Weylandt (BEL)	Quick-Step	25
