= 2005 Brabantse Pijl =

Race details
- Dates: 27 March 2005
- Stages: 1
- Distance: 198.3 km (123.2 mi)
- Winning time: 4h 31' 16"

Results
	Winner	Óscar Freire (ESP)
	Second	Marc Lotz (NED)
	Third	Axel Merckx (BEL)

The 2005 Brabantse Pijl was the 45th edition of the Brabantse Pijl cycle race and was held on 27 March 2005. The race started in Zaventem and finished in Alsemberg. The race was won by Óscar Freire.

== General classification ==
Final general classification

Rank	Rider	Time
1	Óscar Freire (ESP)	4h 31' 16"
2	Marc Lotz (NED)	s.t.
3	Axel Merckx (BEL)	s.t.
4	Wim Van Huffel (BEL)	+ 41"
5	Karsten Kroon (NED)	+ 42"
6	George Hincapie (USA)	s.t.
7	Nick Nuyens (BEL)	s.t.
8	Simon Gerrans (AUS)	s.t.
9	Vladimir Gusev (RUS)	s.t.
10	Sébastien Joly (FRA)	s.t.
