= 2008 Brabantse Pijl =

Race details
- Dates: 30 March 2008
- Stages: 1
- Distance: 192.7 km (119.7 mi)
- Winning time: 4h 44' 38"

Results
	Winner	Sylvain Chavanel (FRA)
	Second	Philippe Gilbert (BEL)
	Third	Juan Antonio Flecha (ESP)

The 2008 Brabantse Pijl was the 48th edition of the Brabantse Pijl cycle race and was held on 30 March 2008. The race started in Leuven and finished in Alsemberg. The race was won by Sylvain Chavanel.

== General classification ==
Final general classification

Rank	Rider	Time
1	Sylvain Chavanel (FRA)	4h 44' 38"
2	Philippe Gilbert (BEL)	+ 29"
3	Juan Antonio Flecha (ESP)	+ 37"
4	Giovanni Visconti (ITA)	+ 38"
5	Frederik Willems (BEL)	+ 40"
6	Fabian Wegmann (GER)	+ 59"
7	Enrico Gasparotto (ITA)	+ 59"
8	Nick Nuyens (BEL)	+ 59"
9	Grégory Rast (SUI)	+ 1' 04"
10	Nico Sijmens (BEL)	+ 1' 04"
