= 2005 Omloop Het Volk =

Race details
- Dates: 26 February 2005
- Stages: 1
- Distance: 201 km (125 mi)
- Winning time: 5h 06' 00"

Results
	Winner	Nick Nuyens (BEL)
	Second	Tom Boonen (BEL)
	Third	Steven de Jongh (NED)

The 2005 Omloop Het Volk was the 58th edition of the Omloop Het Volk cycle race and was held on 26 February 2005. The race started in Ghent and finished in Lokeren. The race was won by Nick Nuyens.

== General classification ==
Final general classification
Rank	Rider	Time
1	Nick Nuyens (BEL)	5h 06' 00"
2	Tom Boonen (BEL)	+ 14"
3	Steven de Jongh (NED)	+ 14"
4	Niko Eeckhout (BEL)	+ 14"
5	Bert De Waele (BEL)	+ 14"
6	Uros Murn (SLO)	+ 14"
7	Roy Sentjens (BEL)	+ 14"
8	Max van Heeswijk (NED)	+ 14"
9	Karsten Kroon (NED)	+ 14"
10	Ludo Dierckxsens (BEL)	+ 14"
