= 2001 UCI Road World Championships =

Cycling world championships

- Venue: Lisbon, Portugal
- Date: 9–14 October 2001
- Coordinates: 38°43′31″N 9°9′0″W
- Events: 10

The 2001 UCI Road World Championships took place in Lisbon, Portugal, from 9 to 14 October 2001. The event consisted of a road race and a time trial for men, women, men under 23, junior men and junior women.

== Events summary ==
Event	Gold		Silver		Bronze	
Men's Events
Men's road race	Óscar Freire; Spain	6h07'21"	Paolo Bettini; Italy	s.t.	Andrej Hauptman; Slovenia	s.t.
Men's time trial	Jan Ullrich; Germany	51'50"	David Millar; Great Britain	+ 6"	Santiago Botero; Colombia	+ 17"
Women's Events
Women's road race	Rasa Polikevičiūtė; Lithuania	3h12'05"	Edita Pučinskaitė; Lithuania	s.t.	Jeannie Longo-Ciprelli; France	s.t.
Women's time trial	Jeannie Longo-Ciprelli; France	29'08"	Nicole Brändli; Switzerland	s.t.	Teodora Ruano; Spain	+ 44"
Men's Under-23 Events
Men's under-23 road race	Yaroslav Popovych; Ukraine	3h36'28"	Giampaolo Caruso; Italy	+ 17"	Ruslan Gryschenko; Ukraine	+ 1'24"
Men's under-23 time trial	Danny Pate; United States	46'29"	Sebastian Lang; Germany	+ 38"	James Lewis Perry; South Africa	+ 39"
Men's Junior Events
Men's Junior Road Race	Oleksandr Kvachuk; Ukraine	2h58'43"	Niels Scheuneman; Netherlands	+ 7"	Mathieu Perget; France	s.t.
Men's Junior Time Trial	Jurgen van den Broeck; Belgium	27'28"	Oleksandr Kvachuk; Ukraine	s.t.	Niels Scheuneman; Netherlands	+ 1"
Women's Junior Events
Women's Junior Road Race	Nicole Cooke; Great Britain	2h01'25"	Pleuni Mohlmann; Netherlands	+ 17"	Maja Włoszczowska; Poland	+ 29"
Women's Junior Time Trial	Nicole Cooke; Great Britain	18'45"	Natalia Bojarskaja; Russia	+ 9"	Diana Elmentaite; Lithuania	+ 10"
