= 2006 Omloop Het Volk =

Race details
- Dates: 25 February 2006
- Stages: 1
- Distance: 202 km (126 mi)
- Winning time: 4h 56' 18"

Results
	Winner	Philippe Gilbert (BEL)
	Second	Bert De Waele (BEL)
	Third	Léon van Bon (NED)

The 2006 Omloop Het Volk was the 59th edition of the Omloop Het Volk cycle race and was held on 25 February 2006. The race started in Ghent and finished in Lokeren. The race was won by Philippe Gilbert.

== General classification ==
Final general classification
Rank	Rider	Time
1	Philippe Gilbert (BEL)	4h 56' 18"
2	Bert De Waele (BEL)	+ 38"
3	Léon van Bon (NED)	+ 54"
4	Koen Barbé (BEL)	+ 54"
5	Filippo Pozzato (ITA)	+ 54"
6	Gert Steegmans (BEL)	+ 1' 45"
7	Joost Posthuma (NED)	+ 1' 45"
8	Franck Rénier (FRA)	+ 1' 45"
9	Wim De Vocht (BEL)	+ 1' 45"
10	Michele Maccanti (ITA)	+ 1' 45"
