= 2007 Brabantse Pijl =

Race details
- Dates: 1 April 2007
- Stages: 1
- Distance: 200 km (124.3 mi)
- Winning time: 4h 45' 00"

Results
	Winner	Óscar Freire (ESP)
	Second	Nick Nuyens (BEL)
	Third	Kim Kirchen (LUX)

The 2007 Brabantse Pijl was the 47th edition of the Brabantse Pijl cycle race and was held on 1 April 2007. The race started in Zaventem and finished in Alsemberg. The race was won by Óscar Freire.

== General classification ==
Final general classification

Rank	Rider	Time
1	Óscar Freire (ESP)	4h 45' 00"
2	Nick Nuyens (BEL)	+ 0"
3	Kim Kirchen (LUX)	+ 0"
4	Enrico Gasparotto (ITA)	+ 0"
5	Karsten Kroon (NED)	+ 0"
6	Michael Boogerd (NED)	+ 8"
7	Björn Leukemans (BEL)	+ 25"
8	Christian Murro (ITA)	+ 28"
9	Mario Aerts (BEL)	+ 28"
10	David Kopp (GER)	+ 35"
