= 2011 Brabantse Pijl =

- Event poster with previous winner Sébastien Rosseler

Race details
- Dates: 13 April 2011
- Stages: 1
- Distance: 200 km (124.3 mi)
- Winning time: 4h 40' 39"

Results
	Winner	Philippe Gilbert (BEL)
	Second	Björn Leukemans (BEL)
	Third	Anthony Geslin (FRA)

The 2011 Brabantse Pijl was the 51st edition of the Brabantse Pijl cycle race and was held on 13 April 2011. The race started in Leuven and finished in Overijse. The race was won by Philippe Gilbert.

== General classification ==
Final general classification

Rank	Rider	Time
1	Philippe Gilbert (BEL)	4h 40' 39"
2	Björn Leukemans (BEL)	+ 0"
3	Anthony Geslin (FRA)	+ 1' 03"
4	Johnny Hoogerland (NED)	+ 1' 03"
5	Bram Tankink (NED)	+ 1' 04"
6	Dries Devenyns (BEL)	+ 1' 18"
7	Romain Zingle (BEL)	+ 1' 23"
8	Gianni Meersman (BEL)	+ 1' 39"
9	Jérôme Pineau (FRA)	+ 1' 41"
10	Simon Geschke (GER)	+ 2' 19"
