= Pleuni Möhlmann =

Dutch cyclist

Personal information
- Born: 25 May 1984 (age 42) Apeldoorn

Cycling career
- Sport: Cycling
- Discipline: Road cycling

Pleuni Möhlmann (born 25 May 1984) is a road cyclist from Netherlands.

As a novice she became Dutch National Champion in the road race in 1999. As a junior, she won the silver medal at the 2001 UCI Road World Championships in the junior women's road race. In 2002, she won the bronze medal in the junior category at the Dutch National Road Race Championships.
