= 2010 Brabantse Pijl =

Race details
- Dates: 14 April 2010
- Stages: 1
- Distance: 200.5 km (124.6 mi)
- Winning time: 4h 45' 07"

Results
	Winner	Sébastien Rosseler (BEL)
	Second	Thomas De Gendt (BEL)
	Third	Jurgen Van de Walle (BEL)

The 2010 Brabantse Pijl was the 50th edition of the Brabantse Pijl cycle race and was held on 14 April 2010. The race started in Leuven and finished in Overijse. The race was won by Sébastien Rosseler.

== General classification ==
Final general classification

Rank	Rider	Time
1	Sébastien Rosseler (BEL)	4h 45' 07"
2	Thomas De Gendt (BEL)	+ 0"
3	Jurgen Van de Walle (BEL)	+ 0"
4	Paul Martens (GER)	+ 43"
5	Philippe Gilbert (BEL)	+ 43"
6	Thomas Voeckler (FRA)	+ 43"
7	Björn Leukemans (BEL)	+ 46"
8	Greg Van Avermaet (BEL)	+ 57"
9	Óscar Freire (ESP)	+ 57"
10	Daniel Moreno (ESP)	+ 57"
