= 2008 Milan–San Remo =

Race details
- Dates: March 22, 2008
- Stages: 1
- Distance: 298 km (185 mi)
- Winning time: 7h 14' 35"

Results
	Winner	Fabian Cancellara (SUI)	(Team CSC)
	Second	Filippo Pozzato (ITA)	(Liquigas)
	Third	Philippe Gilbert (BEL)	(Française des Jeux)

The 2008 Milan–San Remo cycling race took place on March 22, 2008, and was won by Fabian Cancellara. It was the 99th edition of the Milan–San Remo monument classic. It was three kilometres longer than 2007, at 298 km, following the addition of the Le Mànie climb, which was due to roadworks along the previously planned route. The race concluded on Lungomare Italo Calvino and not on the traditional Via Roma due to construction and the Easter weekend.

Last year's winner Óscar Freire was the favourite with bookmakers, following his recent double stage victory at the Tirreno–Adriatico.

== Results ==
	Cyclist	Team	Time
1	Fabian Cancellara (SUI)	Team CSC	7h 14' 35"
2	Filippo Pozzato (ITA)	Liquigas	+4"
3	Philippe Gilbert (BEL)	Française des Jeux	s.t.
4	Davide Rebellin (ITA)	Gerolsteiner	s.t.
5	Mirco Lorenzetto (ITA)	Lampre	s.t.
6	Anthony Geslin (FRA)	Bouygues Télécom	s.t.
7	Rinaldo Nocentini (ITA)	Ag2r–La Mondiale	s.t.
8	Óscar Freire (ESP)	Rabobank	+5"
9	Thor Hushovd (NOR)	Crédit Agricole	s.t.
10	Kurt Asle Arvesen (NOR)	Team CSC	s.t.
