= 2008 Paris–Tours =

Race details
- Dates: 12 October 2008
- Stages: 1
- Distance: 252 km (157 mi)
- Winning time: 5h 47' 43"

Results
	Winner	Philippe Gilbert (BEL)	(Française des Jeux)
	Second	Jan Kuyckx (BEL)	(Landbouwkrediet–Tönissteiner)
	Third	Sébastien Turgot (FRA)	(Bouygues Télécom)

The 2008 Paris–Tours was the 102nd edition of the Paris–Tours cycle race and was held on 12 October 2008. The race started in Saint-Arnoult-en-Yvelines and finished in Tours. The race was won by Philippe Gilbert of the Française des Jeux team.

== General classification ==
Final general classification

Rank	Rider	Team	Time
1	Philippe Gilbert (BEL)	Française des Jeux	5h 47' 43"
2	Jan Kuyckx (BEL)	Landbouwkrediet–Tönissteiner	+ 0"
3	Sébastien Turgot (FRA)	Bouygues Télécom	+ 0"
4	Nicolas Vogondy (FRA)	Agritubel	+ 0"
5	Tyler Farrar (USA)	Garmin–Chipotle p/b H30	+ 4"
6	Robbie McEwen (AUS)	Silence–Lotto	+ 4"
7	Erik Zabel (GER)	Team Milram	+ 4"
8	Daniele Bennati (ITA)	Liquigas	+ 4"
9	Kristof Goddaert (BEL)	Topsport Vlaanderen	+ 4"
10	Tom Boonen (BEL)	Quick-Step	+ 4"
