= 2010 Milan–San Remo =

2010 UCI World Ranking, race 4 of 26

Race details
- Dates: 20 March 2010
- Stages: 1
- Distance: 298 km (185 mi)
- Winning time: 6h 57' 28"

Results
	Winner	Óscar Freire (ESP)	(Rabobank)
	Second	Tom Boonen (BEL)	(Quick-Step)
	Third	Alessandro Petacchi (ITA)	(Lampre–Farnese Vini)

The 2010 Milan–San Remo was the 101st running of the Milan–San Remo cycling race, held on 20 March. The race was won by Óscar Freire of Spain in a bunch sprint finish.

== Teams ==
There were 25 teams competing in the 2010 Milan–San Remo. Each team started with eight riders, making a starting peloton of 200. They are:

- Team HTC–Columbia
- Acqua & Sapone
- Ag2r–La Mondiale
- Androni Giocattoli
- Astana
- Bbox Bouygues Telecom
- BMC Racing Team
- Caisse d'Epargne
- Carmiooro NGC
- Cervélo TestTeam
- Colnago–CSF Inox
- Euskaltel–Euskadi
- Française des Jeux
- Team Sky
- Garmin–Transitions
- ISD–NERI
- Lampre–Farnese Vini
- Liquigas–Doimo
- Omega Pharma–Lotto
- Quick-Step
- Rabobank
- Team Katusha
- Team RadioShack
- Team Milram
- Team Saxo Bank

== Results ==
	Cyclist	Team	Time
1	Óscar Freire (ESP)	Rabobank	6h 57' 28"
2	Tom Boonen (BEL)	Quick-Step	s.t.
3	Alessandro Petacchi (ITA)	Lampre–Farnese Vini	s.t.
4	Sacha Modolo (ITA)	Colnago–CSF Inox	s.t.
5	Daniele Bennati (ITA)	Liquigas–Doimo	s.t.
6	Thor Hushovd (NOR)	Cervélo TestTeam	s.t.
7	Francesco Ginanni (ITA)	Androni Giocattoli	s.t.
8	Maxim Iglinsky (KAZ)	Astana	s.t.
9	Philippe Gilbert (BEL)	Omega Pharma–Lotto	s.t.
10	Luca Paolini (ITA)	Acqua & Sapone	s.t.
Source: CyclingNews
