= 2007 Paris–Tours =

French road bicycle racing event

The 2007 Paris–Tours is the 101st edition of this single day road bicycle racing event and is organized by the Amaury Sport Organisation (ASO), which also runs the Tour de France. The 256 km event took place on October 14, 2007 and was won by Alessandro Petacchi, the Italian rider for Team Milram in 5 hours, 32 minutes 37 seconds at an average speed of 46.179 km/h (28.694 mph).

== General standings ==
=== 2007-10-14: Paris–Tours, 256 km ===
	Cyclist	Team	Time	UCI ProTour Points
1	Alessandro Petacchi (ITA)	Team Milram	5h 32' 37"	40
2	Francesco Chicchi (ITA)	Liquigas	s.t.	30
3	Óscar Freire (ESP)	Rabobank	s.t.	25
4	Steven de Jongh (NED)	Quick-Step–Innergetic	s.t.	20
5	Allan Davis (AUS)	Discovery Channel	s.t.	15
6	Robbie McEwen (AUS)	Predictor–Lotto	s.t.	11
7	Alexandre Usov (BLR)	AG2R Prévoyance	s.t.	7
8	Thor Hushovd (NOR)	Crédit Agricole	s.t.	5
9	Aurélien Clerc (SUI)	Bouygues Télécom	s.t.	3
10	Romain Feillu (FRA)	Agritubel	s.t.	N/A
