= 2007 Milan–San Remo =

Race details
- Dates: March 24, 2007
- Stages: 1
- Distance: 294 km (183 mi)

Results
| | Winner | Óscar Freire (ESP) | (Rabobank) |
| | Second | Allan Davis (AUS) | (Discovery Channel) |
| | Third | Tom Boonen (BEL) | (Quick-Step–Innergetic) |

The 2007 Milan–San Remo race took place on March 24, 2007. It was won by Óscar Freire, the Spanish rider for Rabobank. The race featured the Passo del Turchino, the Cipressa and the Poggio. An attack by Riccardo Riccò and Philippe Gilbert on the Poggio lasted until the final kilometres when the peloton caught them, propelled by Quick-Step–Innergetic and Team Milram. In the sprint, Freire emerged from the wheel of Milram's 2005 victor Alessandro Petacchi to take his second victory in this race, following success in 2004.

== General standings ==
=== 2007-03-24: Milan-Sanremo, 294 km ===
| | Cyclist | Team | Time | UCI ProTour Points |
|---|---|---|---|---|
| 1 | Óscar Freire (ESP) | Rabobank | 6h 43' 50" | 50 |
| 2 | Allan Davis (AUS) | Discovery Channel | s.t. | 40 |
| 3 | Tom Boonen (BEL) | Quick-Step–Innergetic | s.t. | 35 |
| 4 | Robbie McEwen (AUS) | Predictor–Lotto | s.t. | 30 |
| 5 | Stuart O'Grady (AUS) | Team CSC | s.t. | 25 |
| 6 | Erik Zabel (GER) | Team Milram | s.t. | 20 |
| 7 | Gabriele Balducci (ITA) | Acqua & Sapone–Caffè Mokambo | s.t. | N/A |
| 8 | Alessandro Petacchi (ITA) | Team Milram | s.t. | 10 |
| 9 | Vicente Reynès (ESP) | Caisse d'Epargne | s.t. | 5 |
| 10 | Robert Hunter (RSA) | Barloworld | s.t. | N/A |
