= 2006 Paris–Tours =

Cycle race

The 2006 edition of the Paris–Tours marked the 100th anniversary on this one-day French semi-classic cycling race held between Paris and Tours held on October 8, 2006. The parcours was similar to that of previous years, with flattish terrain and a few short climbs at the end.

== General Standings ==
=== 2006-10-08: Saint-Arnoult-en-Yvelines – Tours, 254 km ===
	Cyclist	Team	Time	UCI ProTour Points
1	Frédéric Guesdon (FRA)	Française des Jeux	5h 31' 11"	40 pts.
2	Kurt Asle Arvesen (NOR)	Team CSC	s.t.	30 pts.
3	Stuart O'Grady (AUS)	Team CSC	+ 8"	25 pts.
4	Thor Hushovd (NOR)	Crédit Agricole	+ 8"	20 pts.
5	Alexandre Usov (BLR)	AG2R Prévoyance	+ 8"	15 pts.
6	Baden Cooke (AUS)	Unibet.com	+ 8"	None*
7	Frank Høj (DEN)	Gerolsteiner	+ 8"	7 pts.
8	Danilo Napolitano (ITA)	Lampre–Fondital	+ 8"	5 pts.
9	Tom Steels (BEL)	Davitamon–Lotto	+ 8"	3 pts.
10	Filippo Pozzato (ITA)	Quick-Step–Innergetic	+ 8"	1 pt.

- 6th-place finisher Baden Cooke does not ride on a UCI ProTour team and is ineligible for points.
