= 2010 in men's road cycling =

== World Championships ==
The World Road championships will be held in Melbourne, Australia.

Race	Date	Winner	Second	Third
World Championship Road Race	Oct 3	Thor Hushovd (NOR)	Matti Breschel (DEN)	Allan Davis (AUS)
World Championship Time Trial	Sep 30	Fabian Cancellara (SUI)	David Millar (GBR)	Tony Martin (GER)

== Grand Tours ==
Race	Date	Winner	Second	Third
(Italy) Giro d'Italia	May 8–30	Ivan Basso (ITA)	David Arroyo (ESP)	Vincenzo Nibali (ITA)
Tour de France	Jul 3–25	Andy Schleck (LUX)	Denis Menchov (RUS)	Samuel Sánchez (ESP)
(Spain) Vuelta a España	Aug 28 – Sep 19	Vincenzo Nibali (ITA)	Ezequiel Mosquera (ESP)	Peter Velits (SVK)

== UCI ProTour ==
Race	Date	Winner	Second	Third
(Australia) Tour Down Under	Jan 19–24	André Greipel (GER)	Luis León Sánchez (ESP)	Greg Henderson (NZL)
(Spain) Volta a Catalunya	Mar 22–28	Joaquim Rodríguez (ESP)	Xavier Tondó (ESP)	Rein Taaramäe (EST)
(Belgium) Gent–Wevelgem	Mar 28	Bernhard Eisel (AUT)	Sep Vanmarcke (BEL)	Philippe Gilbert (BEL)
(Belgium) Tour of Flanders	Apr 4	Fabian Cancellara (SUI)	Tom Boonen (BEL)	Philippe Gilbert (BEL)
(Spain) Vuelta al País Vasco	Apr 5–10	Chris Horner (USA)	Beñat Intxausti (ESP)	Joaquim Rodríguez (ESP)
(Netherlands) Amstel Gold Race	Apr 18	Philippe Gilbert (BEL)	Ryder Hesjedal (CAN)	Enrico Gasparotto (ITA)
(Switzerland) Tour de Romandie	Apr 27 – May 2	Simon Špilak (SLO)	Denis Menchov (RUS)	Michael Rogers (AUS)
(France) Critérium du Dauphiné	Jun 6–13	Janez Brajkovič (SLO)	Alberto Contador (ESP)	Tejay van Garderen (USA)
(Switzerland) Tour de Suisse	Jun 12	Fränk Schleck (LUX)	Lance Armstrong (USA)	Jakob Fuglsang (DEN)
(Spain) Clásica de San Sebastián	Jul 31	Luis León Sánchez (ESP)	Alexander Vinokourov (KAZ)	Carlos Sastre (ESP)
(Poland) Tour de Pologne	Aug 1	Dan Martin (IRL)	Grega Bole (SLO)	Bauke Mollema (NED)
(Germany) Vattenfall Cyclassics	Aug 15	Tyler Farrar (USA)	Edvald Boasson Hagen (NOR)	André Greipel (GER)
(Belgium) (Netherlands) Eneco Tour	Aug 17–24	Tony Martin (GER)	Koos Moerenhout (NED)	Edvald Boasson Hagen (NOR)
GP Ouest-France	Aug 22	Matthew Goss (AUS)	Tyler Farrar (USA)	Yoann Offredo (FRA)
(Canada) Grand Prix Cycliste de Québec	Sep 10	Thomas Voeckler (FRA)	Edvald Boasson Hagen (NOR)	Robert Gesink (NED)
(Canada) Grand Prix Cycliste de Montréal	Sep 12	Robert Gesink (NED)	Peter Sagan (SVK)	Ryder Hesjedal (CAN)

== Other World Calendar events ==
These races contribute, along with the Grand Tours and the UCI ProTour races, towards the 2010 UCI World Ranking

Race	Date	Winner	Second	Third
(France) Paris–Nice	Mar 7	Alberto Contador (ESP)	Luis León Sánchez (ESP)	Roman Kreuziger (CZE)
(Italy) Tirreno–Adriatico	Mar 10	Stefano Garzelli (ITA)	Michele Scarponi (ITA)	Cadel Evans (AUS)
(Italy) Milan–Sanremo	Mar 20	Óscar Freire (ESP)	Tom Boonen (BEL)	Alessandro Petacchi (ITA)
(France) Paris–Roubaix	Apr 11	Fabian Cancellara (SWI)	Thor Hushovd (NOR)	Juan Antonio Flecha (ESP)
(Belgium) La Flèche Wallonne	Apr 21	Cadel Evans (AUS)	Joaquim Rodríguez (ESP)	Alberto Contador (ESP)
(Belgium) Liège–Bastogne–Liège	Apr 26	Alexander Vinokourov (KAZ)	Alexandr Kolobnev (RUS)	Philippe Gilbert (BEL)
(Italy) Giro di Lombardia	Oct 16	Philippe Gilbert (BEL)	Michele Scarponi (ITA)	Pablo Lastras (ESP)

== 2.HC Category Races ==
The prefix 2 indicates that these events are stage races.

Race	Date	Winner	Second	Third
(Malaysia) 2010 Tour de Langkawi	Mar 1	José Rujano (VEN)	Gong Hyo-suk (KOR)	Hossein Askari (IRI)
(France) Critérium International	Mar 27–28	Pierrick Fédrigo (FRA)	Michael Rogers (AUS)	Tiago Machado (POR)
(Belgium) Three Days of De Panne	Mar 30 – Apr 1	David Millar (UK)	Andriy Hryvko (UKR)	Luca Paolini (ITA)
Tour of Turkey	Apr 11–18	Giovanni Visconti (ITA)	Tejay van Garderen (USA)	David Moncoutié (FRA)
(France) Four Days of Dunkirk	May 5	Martin Elmiger (SWI)	Rui Costa (POR)	José Joaquín Rojas Gil (ESP)
(United States) 2010 Tour of California	May 16–23	Michael Rogers (AUS)	David Zabriskie (USA)	Levi Leipheimer (USA)
Tour of Belgium	May 26–30	Stijn Devolder (BEL)	Dominique Cornu (BEL)	Bram Tankink (NED)
(Germany) Bayern Rundfahrt	May 26–30	Maxime Monfort (BEL)	Adriano Malori (ITA)	Simon Špilak (SLO)
Tour de Luxembourg	Jun 2	Matteo Carrara (ITA)	Fränk Schleck (LUX)	Sergey Ivanov (RUS)
Tour of Austria	July 4	Riccardo Riccò (ITA)	Sergio Pardilla (ITA)	Emanuele Sella (ITA)
(China) Tour of Qinghai Lake	July 16–25	Hossein Askari (IRI)	Radoslav Rogina (CRO)	Kiel Reijnen (USA)
(Belgium) Tour de Wallonie	July 24–28	Russell Downing (GBR)	Marco Marcato (ITA)	Laurent Mangel (FRA)
Tour of Denmark	Aug 4–8	Jakob Fuglsang (DEN)	Svein Tuft (CAN)	Matthew Busche (USA)
(Spain) Vuelta a Burgos	Aug 4–8	Samuel Sánchez (ESP)	Ezequiel Mosquera (ESP)	Vincenzo Nibali (ITA)

== 1.HC Category Races ==
The prefix 1 indicates that these events are one-day races.

Race	Date	Winner	Second	Third
(Belgium) Omloop Het Nieuwsblad	Feb 27	Juan Antonio Flecha (ESP)	Heinrich Haussler (GER)	Tyler Farrar (USA)
(Belgium) E3 Prijs Vlaanderen	Mar 29	Fabian Cancellara (SUI)	Tom Boonen (BEL)	Juan Antonio Flecha (ESP)
(Spain) GP Miguel Induráin	Apr 4	Joaquim Rodríguez (ESP)	Michel Kreder (NED)	Alexandr Kolobnev (RUS)
(Belgium) Scheldeprijs	Apr 7	Tyler Farrar (USA)	Robbie McEwen (AUS)	Robert Forster (GER)
(Germany) Eschborn–Frankfurt City Loop	May 1	Fabian Wegmann (GER)	Geert Verheyen (BEL)	Bert Scheirlinckx (BEL)
(United States) Philadelphia International Championship	Jun 6	Matthew Goss (AUS)	Peter Sagan (SVK)	Alexander Kristoff (NOR)
(Netherlands) Veenendaal–Veenendaal	Aug 13	Edvald Boasson Hagen (NOR)	Kenny van Hummel (NED)	Stefan van Dijk (NED)
(Italy) Tre Valli Varesine	Aug 18	Dan Martin (IRE)	Domenico Pozzovivo (ITA)	Jérôme Baugnies (BEL)
(Italy) Giro del Veneto	Aug 29	Daniel Oss (ITA)	Peter Sagan (SVK)	Sacha Modolo (ITA)
(Belgium) Paris–Brussels	Sep 12	Francisco Ventoso (ESP)	Romain Feillu (FRA)	Stefan van Dijk (NED)
(France) Grand Prix de Fourmies	Sep 13	Romain Feillu (FRA)	Davide Appollonio (ITA)	Kenny Dehaes (BEL)
(Italy) Giro dell'Emilia	Oct 10	Robert Gesink (NED)	Dan Martin (IRL)	Michele Scarponi (ITA)
(France) Paris–Tours	Oct 11	Óscar Freire (ESP)	Angelo Furlan (ITA)	Gert Steegmans (BEL)
(Italy) Giro del Piemonte	Oct 15	Philippe Gilbert (BEL)	Leonardo Bertagnolli (ITA)	Matti Breschel (DEN)

== See also ==
- 2010 in women's road cycling
