= 2010 UCI ProTour =

6th season of the cycling tournament

- Sixth edition of the UCI ProTour

Details
- Dates: 19 January – 12 September
- Location: Australia, Canada and Europe
- Races: 16

The 2010 UCI ProTour is the sixth series of the UCI ProTour: a series of 16 races in which the ProTour teams, considered the elite teams of the sport, participate alongside a number of invited "wildcard" teams. As in 2009, there is no competitive element to the ProTour of itself, but all its events contribute towards the 2010 UCI World Ranking. The first race was the 2010 Tour Down Under on 19–24 January, and the series will end with two new events, bringing the tour to North America for the first time, the Grand Prix Cycliste de Québec and the Grand Prix Cycliste de Montréal on 10 September and 12 September respectively.

Two newly formed teams, the American Team RadioShack and British based Team Sky, joined the ProTour, while the licenses of Bbox Bouygues Telecom and Cofidis were not renewed. The Lampre–Farnese Vini team, although it has a ProTour Licence from the UCI valid until 2013, had its annual registration refused, and missed the first event of the tour while the matter remained unresolved. It subsequently received a temporary licence until 31 March, at which stage the full licence was restored. A number of teams have had name changes: Fuji–Servetto became Footon–Servetto–Fuji, a second name sponsor saw Garmin–Slipstream rename as Garmin–Transitions, and the name of the company, rather than one of its products, is featured in the change from Silence–Lotto to Omega Pharma–Lotto. Immediately before the Tour de France in July, two more teams altered their names: Française des Jeux simplified their name to FDJ, while Lampre–Farnese Vini became Lampre–Farnese.

== 2010 UCI ProTour races ==
Dates	Race	Winner	UCI World Ranking leader
19–24 January	(Australia) Tour Down Under	André Greipel (GER) (Team HTC–Columbia)	André Greipel (GER) (Team HTC–Columbia)
22–28 March	(Spain) Volta a Catalunya	Joaquim Rodríguez (ESP) (Team Katusha)	Luis León Sánchez (ESP) (Caisse d'Epargne)
28 March	(Belgium) Gent–Wevelgem	Bernhard Eisel (AUT) (Team HTC–Columbia)	Luis León Sánchez (ESP) (Caisse d'Epargne)
4 April	(Belgium) Tour of Flanders	Fabian Cancellara (SUI) (Team Saxo Bank)	Luis León Sánchez (ESP) (Caisse d'Epargne)
5–10 April	(Spain) Tour of the Basque Country	Chris Horner (USA) (Team RadioShack)	Luis León Sánchez (ESP) (Caisse d'Epargne)
18 April	(Netherlands) Amstel Gold Race	Philippe Gilbert (BEL) (Omega Pharma–Lotto)	Luis León Sánchez (ESP) (Caisse d'Epargne)
27 April–2 May	(Switzerland) Tour de Romandie	Simon Špilak (SLO) (Lampre–Farnese Vini)	Philippe Gilbert (BEL) (Omega Pharma–Lotto)
6–13 June	(France) Critérium du Dauphiné	Janez Brajkovič (SLO) (Team RadioShack)	Cadel Evans (AUS) (BMC Racing Team)
12–20 June	(Switzerland) Tour de Suisse	Fränk Schleck (LUX) (Team Saxo Bank)	Cadel Evans (AUS) (BMC Racing Team)
31 July	(Spain) Clásica de San Sebastián	Luis León Sánchez (ESP) (Caisse d'Epargne)	Alberto Contador (ESP) (Astana)
1–7 August	(Poland) Tour de Pologne	Dan Martin (IRL) (Garmin–Transitions)	Alberto Contador (ESP) (Astana)
15 August	(Germany) Vattenfall Cyclassics	Tyler Farrar (USA) (Garmin–Transitions)	Alberto Contador (ESP) (Astana)
17–24 August	(Belgium) / (Netherlands) Eneco Tour	Tony Martin (GER) (Team HTC–Columbia)	Alberto Contador (ESP) (Astana)
22 August	GP Ouest-France	Matthew Goss (AUS) (Team HTC–Columbia)	Alberto Contador (ESP) (Astana)
10 September	(Canada) Grand Prix Cycliste de Québec	Thomas Voeckler (FRA) (Bbox Bouygues Telecom)	Alberto Contador (ESP) (Astana)
12 September	(Canada) Grand Prix Cycliste de Montréal	Robert Gesink (NED) (Rabobank)	Alberto Contador (ESP) (Astana)

== Teams ==
Code	Team Name		Bike
ALM	(France)	Ag2r–La Mondiale	Kuota
AST	(Kazakhstan)	Astana	Specialized
GCE	(Spain)	Caisse d'Epargne	Pinarello
EUS	(Spain)	Euskaltel–Euskadi	Orbea
FOT	(Spain)	Footon–Servetto–Fuji	Fuji
FDJ	(France)	FDJ*	Lapierre
GRM	(United States)	Garmin–Transitions	Felt
LAM	(Italy)	Lampre–Farnese#	Wilier
LIQ	(Italy)	Liquigas–Doimo	Cannondale
OLO	(Belgium)	Omega Pharma–Lotto	Canyon
QST	(Belgium)	Quick-Step	Eddy Merckx
RAB	(Netherlands)	Rabobank	Giant
SKY	(United Kingdom)	Team Sky	Pinarello
THR	(United States)	Team HTC–Columbia	Specialized
KAT	(Russia)	Team Katusha	Ridley
MRM	(Germany)	Team Milram	Focus
RSH	(United States)	Team RadioShack	Trek
SAX	(Denmark)	Team Saxo Bank	Specialized

1. known as Lampre–Farnese Vini until 28 June.
- known as Française des Jeux until 2 July.
