= 2010 UCI World Ranking =

International series of cycle races

- Second edition of the UCI World Ranking

Details
- Dates: 19 January – 16 October
- Location: Europe, Australia and Canada
- Races: 26

Champions
- Individual champion: Joaquim Rodríguez (ESP) (Team Katusha)
- Teams' champion: Team Saxo Bank
- Nations' champion: Spain

The 2010 UCI World Ranking was the second edition of the ranking system launched by the Union Cycliste Internationale (UCI) in 2009; the following year it would be merged with the UCI ProTour to form the UCI World Tour. The series started with the Tour Down Under's opening stage on 19 January, and consisted of 13 stage races and 13 one-day races, culminating in the Giro di Lombardia on 16 October. Two new races, the Grand Prix Cycliste de Québec and the Grand Prix Cycliste de Montréal were added to the ProTour series, and consequently to the ranking schedule. These two Canadian events, and the Tour Down Under, were the only races in the series to take place outside Europe.

== Events ==
All 16 events of the 2010 UCI ProTour were included in the series calendar, along with the three Grand Tours, two early season stage races, and five one-day classics.

Race	Date	Winner	Second	Third	Other points (4th place onwards)	Stage points
(Australia) Tour Down Under	Jan 19 – Jan 24	André Greipel (GER) (100 pts)	Luis León Sánchez (ESP) (80 pts)	Greg Henderson (NZL) (70 pts)	60, 50, 40, 30, 20, 10, 4	6, 4, 2, 1, 1
(France) Paris–Nice	Mar 7 – Mar 14	Alberto Contador (ESP) (100 pts)	Luis León Sánchez (ESP)† (80 pts)	Roman Kreuziger (CZE)† (70 pts)	60, 50, 40, 30, 20, 10, 4	6, 4, 2, 1, 1
(Italy) Tirreno–Adriatico	Mar 10 – Mar 16	Stefano Garzelli (ITA) (100 pts)	Michele Scarponi (ITA) (80 pts)	Cadel Evans (AUS) (70 pts)	60, 50, 40, 30, 20, 10, 4	6, 4, 2, 1, 1
(Italy) Milan–San Remo	Mar 20	Óscar Freire (ESP) (100 pts)	Tom Boonen (BEL) (80 pts)	Alessandro Petacchi (ITA) (70 pts)	60, 50, 40, 30, 20, 10, 4	N/A
(Spain) Volta a Catalunya	Mar 22 – Mar 28	Joaquim Rodríguez (ESP) (100 pts)	Xavier Tondó (ESP) (80 pts)	Rein Taaramäe (EST) (70 pts)	60, 50, 40, 30, 20, 10, 4	6, 4, 2, 1, 1
(Belgium) Gent–Wevelgem	Mar 28	Bernhard Eisel (AUT) (80 pts)	Sep Vanmarcke (BEL) (60 pts)	Philippe Gilbert (BEL) (50 pts)	40, 30, 22, 14, 10, 6, 2	N/A
(Belgium) Tour of Flanders	April 4	Fabian Cancellara (SUI) (100 pts)	Tom Boonen (BEL) (80 pts)	Philippe Gilbert (BEL) (70 pts)	60, 50, 40, 30, 20, 10, 4	N/A
(Spain) Tour of the Basque Country	Apr 5 – Apr 10	Chris Horner (USA) (100 pts)	Beñat Intxausti (ESP)† (80 pts)	Joaquim Rodríguez (ESP)† (70 pts)	60, 50, 40, 30, 20, 10, 4	6, 4, 2, 1, 1
(France) Paris–Roubaix	Apr 11	Fabian Cancellara (SUI) (100 pts)	Thor Hushovd (NOR) (80 pts)	Juan Antonio Flecha (ESP) (70 pts)	60, 50, 40, 30, 20, 10, 4	N/A
(Netherlands) Amstel Gold Race	Apr 18	Philippe Gilbert (BEL) (80 pts)	Ryder Hesjedal (CAN) (60 pts)	Enrico Gasparotto (ITA) (50 pts)	40, 30, 22, 14, 10, 6, 2	N/A
(Belgium) La Flèche Wallonne	Apr 21	Cadel Evans (AUS) (80 pts)	Joaquim Rodríguez (ESP) (60 pts)	Alberto Contador (ESP) (50 pts)	40, 30, 22, 14, 10, 6, 2	N/A
(Belgium) Liège–Bastogne–Liège	Apr 25	Alexander Vinokourov (KAZ) (100 pts)	Alexandr Kolobnev (RUS) (80 pts)	Philippe Gilbert (BEL)† (70 pts)	60, 50, 40, 30, 20, 10, 4	N/A
(Switzerland) Tour de Romandie	Apr 27 – May 2	Simon Špilak (SLO)† (100 pts)	Denis Menchov (RUS)† (80 pts)	Michael Rogers (AUS)† (70 pts)	60, 50, 40, 30, 20, 10, 4	6, 4, 2, 1, 1
(Italy) Giro d'Italia	May 8–30	Ivan Basso (ITA) (170 pts)	David Arroyo (ESP) (130 pts)	Vincenzo Nibali (ITA) (100 pts)	90, 80, 70, 60, 52, 44, 38, 32, 26, 22 18, 14, 10, 8, 6, 4, 2	16, 8, 4, 2, 1
(France) Critérium du Dauphiné	Jun 6 – Jun 13	Janez Brajkovič (SLO) (100 pts)	Alberto Contador (ESP) (80 pts)	Tejay van Garderen (USA) (70 pts)	60, 50, 40, 30, 20, 10, 4	6, 4, 2, 1, 1
(Switzerland) Tour de Suisse	Jun 12 – Jun 20	Fränk Schleck (LUX) (100 pts)	Lance Armstrong (USA) (80 pts)	Jakob Fuglsang (DEN) (70 pts)	60, 50, 40, 30, 20, 10, 4	6, 4, 2, 1, 1
Tour de France	Jul 3 – Jul 25	Andy Schleck (LUX)† (200 pts)	Denis Menchov (RUS)† (150 pts)	Samuel Sánchez (ESP)† (120 pts)	110, 100, 90, 80, 70, 60, 50, 40, 30, 24, 20, 16, 12, 10, 8, 6, 4	20, 10, 6, 4, 2
(Spain) Clásica de San Sebastián	Jul 31	Luis León Sánchez (ESP) (80 pts)	Alexander Vinokourov (KAZ) (60 pts)	Carlos Sastre (ESP) (50 pts)	40, 30, 22, 14, 10, 6, 2	N/A
(Poland) Tour de Pologne	Aug 1 – Aug 7	Dan Martin (IRL) (100 pts)	Grega Bole (SLO) (80 pts)	Bauke Mollema (NED) (70 pts)	60, 50, 40, 30, 20, 10, 4	6, 4, 2, 1, 1
(Germany) Vattenfall Cyclassics	Aug 15	Tyler Farrar (USA) (80 pts)	Edvald Boasson Hagen (NOR) (60 pts)	André Greipel (GER) (50 pts)	40, 30, 22, 14, 10, 6, 2	N/A
(Belgium) (Netherlands) Eneco Tour	Aug 17 – Aug 24	Tony Martin (GER) (100 pts)	Koos Moerenhout (NED) (80 pts)	Edvald Boasson Hagen (NOR) (70 pts)	60, 50, 40, 30, 20, 10, 4	6, 4, 2, 1, 1
GP Ouest-France	Aug 22	Matthew Goss (AUS) (80 pts)	Tyler Farrar (USA) (60 pts)	Yoann Offredo (FRA) (50 pts)	40, 30, 22, 14, 10, 6, 2	N/A
(Spain) Vuelta a España	Aug 28 – Sep 19	Vincenzo Nibali (ITA) (170 pts)	Peter Velits (SVK) (130 pts)	Joaquim Rodríguez (ESP) (100 pts)	90, 80, 70, 60, 52, 44, 38, 32, 26, 22 18, 14, 10, 8, 6, 4, 2	16, 8, 4, 2, 1
(Canada) GP de Québec	Sept 10	Thomas Voeckler (FRA) (80 pts)	Edvald Boasson Hagen (NOR) (60 pts)	Robert Gesink (NED) (50 pts)	40, 30, 22, 14, 10, 6, 2	N/A
(Canada) GP de Montréal	Sept 12	Robert Gesink (NED) (80 pts)	Peter Sagan (SVK) (60 pts)	Ryder Hesjedal (CAN) (50 pts)	40, 30, 22, 14, 10, 6, 2	N/A
(Italy) Giro di Lombardia	Oct 16	Philippe Gilbert (BEL) (100 pts)	Michele Scarponi (ITA) (80 pts)	Pablo Lastras (ESP) (70 pts)	60, 50, 40, 30, 20, 10, 4	N/A

†: Riders promoted after removal of the results of Alejandro Valverde or (in the Tour de France) of Alberto Contador

== Final standings ==
On 31 May, the UCI annulled all results obtained by then rankings leader Alejandro Valverde, and removed his points, as he received a suspension due to his involvement in the Operación Puerto doping case. The two-year suspension was in part retroactive, dating from 1 January 2010. His points were also removed from his team, Caisse d'Epargne, and the Spanish national score, both of which had previously been at the top of their rankings. Valverde's points for final position were reallocated: his points gained in individual stages of stage races were deleted.

In February 2012, Alberto Contador had all his results from the 2010 Tour de France annulled, and these points were retrospectively reallocated in the 2010 rankings. Contador dropped from second place to thirteenth as a result.

=== Individual ===
Rank	Name	Team	Points
1	Joaquim Rodríguez (ESP)	Team Katusha	561
2	Philippe Gilbert (BEL)	Omega Pharma–Lotto	437
3	Luis León Sánchez (ESP)	Caisse d'Epargne	413
4	Cadel Evans (AUS)	BMC Racing Team	390
5	Vincenzo Nibali (ITA)	Liquigas–Doimo	390
6	Robert Gesink (NED)	Rabobank	379
7	Ryder Hesjedal (CAN)	Garmin–Transitions	317
8	Samuel Sánchez (ESP)	Euskaltel–Euskadi	311
9	Andy Schleck (LUX)	Team Saxo Bank	308
10	Tyler Farrar (USA)	Garmin–Transitions	306
11	Alexander Vinokourov (KAZ)	Astana	287
12	Michele Scarponi (ITA)	Androni Giocattoli	283
13	Alberto Contador (ESP)	Astana	260
14	Fabian Cancellara (SUI)	Team Saxo Bank	254
15	Denis Menchov (RUS)	Rabobank	251
16	Fränk Schleck (LUX)	Team Saxo Bank	230
17	Edvald Boasson Hagen (NOR)	Team Sky	228
18	Chris Horner (USA)	Team RadioShack	226
19	Tom Boonen (BEL)	Quick-Step	216
20	André Greipel (GER)	Team HTC–Columbia	211

- 278 riders scored at least one point. Additionally, Marek Rutkiewicz of the Polish selection finished 7th overall in the Tour de Pologne, which would have earned 30 points, but as a member of a national selection rather than a UCI registered team, he was not eligible for points.

=== Team ===
Team rankings are calculated by adding the ranking points of the top five riders of a team in the table. Teams with the same number of points are ranked according to their top-ranked rider.

It had been said that the top 17 teams at the end of the season would be guaranteed a place in the three Grand Tours in 2011, although with one race remaining, the UCI announced the launch of the WorldTour, meaning that teams of ProTour status would have the right to participate in all ranking events in 2011, including the Grand Tours, regardless of position in this table. Androni Giocattoli, despite finishing 17th, were not granted a place in the 2011 Tour de France.

Rank	Team	Points	Top five riders
1	Team Saxo Bank	1055	A. Schleck (308), Cancellara (254), F. Schleck (230), Porte (133), Fuglsang (130)
2	Liquigas–Doimo	1006	Nibali (390), Basso (206), Kreuziger (206), P. Sagan (111), Bennati (93)
3	Rabobank	906	Gesink (379), Menchov (251), Freire (127), Mollema (104), Moerenhout (87)
4	Team Katusha	910	Rodríguez (561), McEwen (105), Karpets (102), Kolobnev (82), Pozzato (60)
5	Team HTC–Columbia	855	Greipel (211), Cavendish (198), Martin (179), Pinotti (140), Velits (127)
6	Garmin–Transitions	849	Hesjedal (317), Farrar (306), Martin (106), Danielson (64), Tuft (56)
7	Omega Pharma–Lotto	784	Gilbert (437), Van Den Broeck (179), Péraud (80), Roelandts (58), Scheirlinckx (30)
8	Astana	768	Vinokourov (287), Contador (260), Iglinsky (117), Gasparotto (56), Davis (48)
9	Caisse d'Epargne	721	Sánchez (413), Arroyo (132), Lastras (74), Plaza (56), Rojas (46)
10	BMC Racing Team	661	Evans (390), Ballan (86), Hincapie (80), Morabito (61), Santambrogio (44)
11	Team RadioShack	635	Horner (226), Brajkovič (174), Armstrong (85), Zubeldia (80), Klöden (70)
12	Cervélo TestTeam	618	Hushovd (173), Tondó (171), Sastre (164), Hammond (90), Wyss (20)
13	Euskaltel–Euskadi	605	Sánchez (311), Antón (132), Intxausti (82), Nieve (72), Fernández (8)
14	Lampre–Farnese Vini	535	Petacchi (182), Špilak (108), Bole (107), Cunego (106), Gavazzi (32)
15	Team Sky	435	Boasson Hagen (228), Henderson (103), Flecha (71), Wiggins (18), Thomas (15)
16	Quick-Step	325	Boonen (216), Chavanel (40), Barredo (26), Weylandt (23), Pineau (20)
17	Androni Giocattoli	323	Scarponi (283), Ginanni (30), Bertogliati (8), Bertagnolli (2)
18	Ag2r–La Mondiale	267	Roche (154), Riblon (51), Gadret (34), Hinault (18), Bouet (10)
19	Bbox Bouygues Telecom	231	Voeckler (121), Vogondy (46), Rolland (24), Fédrigo (20), Tschopp (20)
20	Cofidis	227	Taaramäe (111), Duque (54), Moncoutié (38), Monier (16), Dumoulin (8)

- 32 teams scored at least one point.

=== Nation ===
National rankings are calculated by adding the ranking points of the top five riders registered in a nation in the table. Nations with the same number of points are ranked according to their top-ranked rider. The top ten nations as of 15 August were permitted up to nine riders at the 2010 UCI Road World Championships in Australia in October.

Rank	Nation	Points	Top five riders
1	Spain	1716	Rodríguez (561), L. L. Sánchez (413), S. Sánchez (311), Contador (260), Tondo (171)
2	Italy	1201	Nibali (390), Scarponi (283), Basso (206), Petacchi (182), Pinotti (140)
3	Belgium	992	Gilbert (437), Boonen (216), Van Den Broeck (179), Leukemans (100), Vanmarcke (60)
4	Australia	850	Evans (390), Porte (133), Rogers (113), Goss (109), McEwen (105)
5	United States	773	Farrar (306), Horner (226), Armstrong (85), Hincapie (80), van Garderen (76)
6	Netherlands	653	Gesink (379), Mollema (104), Moerenhout (87), Boom (48), Tjallingii (35)
7	Germany	551	Greipel (211), Martin (179), Klöden (70), Voigt (62), Hondo (29)
8	Luxembourg	538	A. Schleck (308), F. Schleck (230)
9	Russia	483	Menchov (251), Karpets (102), Kolobnev (82), Vorganov (30), Petrov (18)
10	Norway	441	Boasson Hagen (228), Hushovd (173), Kristoff (40)
11	Switzerland	422	Cancellara (254), Albasini (67), Morabito (61), Tschopp (20), Wyss (20)
12	Kazakhstan	410	Vinokourov (287), Iglinsky (117), Kashechkin (6)
13	Slovenia	390	Brajkovič (174), Špilak (108), Bole (107), Božič (1)
13	France	386	Voeckler (121), Péraud (80), Casar (73), Coppel (61), Riblon (51)
15	Canada	373	Hesjedal (317), Tuft (56)
16	Great Britain	331	Cavendish (198), Hammond (90), Wiggins (18), Thomas (15), Millar (10)
17	Ireland	258	Roche (152), Martin (106)
18	Slovakia	242	P Velits (127), Sagan (111), M Velits (4)
19	Czech Republic	206	Kreuziger (206)
20	Denmark	165	Fuglsang (130), Breschel (16), Sørensen (16), Rasmussen (3)

- Riders from 34 nations earned at least one point.

== Leader progress ==
Event (Winner)	Individual	Team	Nation
Tour Down Under (André Greipel)	André Greipel	Team HTC–Columbia	Australia
Paris–Nice (Alberto Contador)	Luis León Sánchez	Caisse d'Epargne	Spain
Tirreno–Adriatico (Stefano Garzelli)	Luis León Sánchez	Caisse d'Epargne	Spain
Milan–San Remo (Óscar Freire)	Luis León Sánchez	Caisse d'Epargne	Spain
Volta a Catalunya (Joaquim Rodríguez)	Luis León Sánchez	Caisse d'Epargne	Spain
Gent–Wevelgem (Bernhard Eisel)	Luis León Sánchez	Caisse d'Epargne	Spain
Tour of Flanders (Fabian Cancellara)	Luis León Sánchez	Caisse d'Epargne	Spain
Tour of the Basque Country (Chris Horner)	Luis León Sánchez	Caisse d'Epargne	Spain
Paris–Roubaix (Fabian Cancellara)	Luis León Sánchez	Caisse d'Epargne	Spain
Amstel Gold Race (Philippe Gilbert)	Luis León Sánchez	Caisse d'Epargne	Spain
La Flèche Wallonne (Cadel Evans)	Joaquim Rodríguez	Caisse d'Epargne	Spain
Liège–Bastogne–Liège (Alexander Vinokourov)	Philippe Gilbert	Caisse d'Epargne	Spain
Tour de Romandie (Simon Špilak)	Alejandro Valverde	Caisse d'Epargne	Spain
Giro d'Italia (Ivan Basso)	Alejandro Valverde	Caisse d'Epargne	Spain
Removal of Valverde results	Cadel Evans	Team Katusha	Spain
Critérium du Dauphiné (Janez Brajkovič)	Cadel Evans	Astana	Spain
Tour de Suisse (Fränk Schleck)	Cadel Evans	Astana	Spain
Tour de France (Alberto Contador)	Alberto Contador	Astana	Spain
Clásica de San Sebastián (Luis León Sánchez)	Alberto Contador	Astana	Spain
Tour de Pologne (Dan Martin)	Alberto Contador	Astana	Spain
Vattenfall Cyclassics (Tyler Farrar)	Alberto Contador	Astana	Spain
GP Ouest-France (Matthew Goss)	Alberto Contador	Astana	Spain
Eneco Tour (Tony Martin)	Alberto Contador	Astana	Spain
GP de Québec (Thomas Voeckler)	Alberto Contador	Astana	Spain
GP de Montréal (Robert Gesink)	Alberto Contador	Astana	Spain
Vuelta a España (Vincenzo Nibali)	Joaquim Rodríguez	Astana	Spain
Giro di Lombardia (Philippe Gilbert)	Joaquim Rodríguez	Team Saxo Bank	Spain
