= Nicolas Roche =

Irish road cyclist (born 1984)

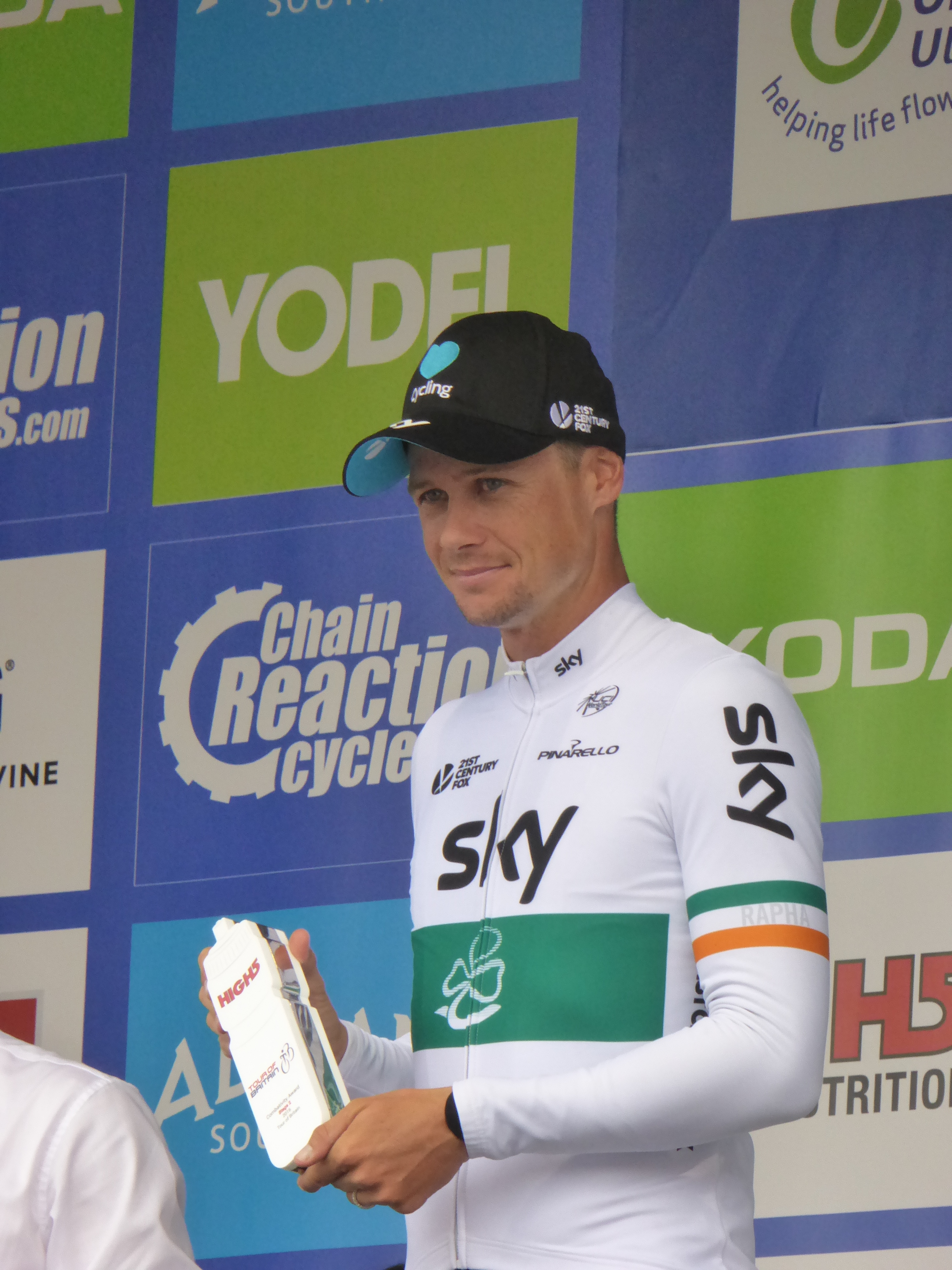
- Roche, wearing the Irish national champion jersey, at the 2016 Tour of Britain.

Personal information
- Full name: Nicolas Roche
- Nickname: Nico
- Born: 3 July 1984 (age 42) Conflans-Sainte-Honorine, Île-de-France, France
- Height: 1.78 m (5 ft 10 in)
- Weight: 70 kg (154 lb; 11 st 0 lb)

Cycling career
- Sport: Cycling
- Current team: NR GRVL; Trinity Racing
- Disciplines: Road; Gravel
- Role: Rider; Directeur sportif
- Rider type: All-rounder; Domestique

Amateur teams
- 2002: OCCV Draguignan
- 2003: SC Nice
- 2003–2004: Vélo-Club La Pomme Marseille
- 2004: Cofidis (stagiaire)
- 2023–: NR GRVL

Professional teams
- 2005–2006: Cofidis
- 2007–2008: Crédit Agricole
- 2009–2012: Ag2r–La Mondiale
- 2013–2014: Saxo–Tinkoff
- 2015–2016: Team Sky
- 2017–2018: BMC Racing Team
- 2019–2021: Team Sunweb

Managerial team
- 2022–: Trinity Racing

Major wins
- Grand Tours Vuelta a España 2 individual stages (2013, 2015) 1 TTT stage (2017) One-day races and Classics National Road Race Championships (2009, 2016) National Time Trial Championships (2007, 2016)

Nicolas Roche (/ˈroʊtʃ/; born 3 July 1984) is an Irish cyclist, who competes in gravel cycling for his own NR GRVL team. He is also a former professional road bicycle racer, who rode professionally between 2005 and 2021 for seven different teams.

During his professional road racing career, Roche took twelve victories, including four titles at the Irish National Cycling Championships – two each in the road race and the time trial – and stage victories at the Vuelta a España in 2013 and 2015. He started a total of 24 Grand Tours, finishing 22, and he took a total of 65 top-10 finishes in Grand Tour stages, including 43 at the Vuelta a España (where he recorded a pair of top-10 overall finishes). He represented Ireland at the Olympics on four occasions between 2008 and 2020, and represented Ireland at the UCI Road World Championships eleven times between 2006 and 2020.

Since retiring from road cycling at the end of the 2021 season, Roche has worked as a directeur sportif for UCI Continental team Trinity Racing and as a commentator for the international television feed at the Tour de France alongside Anthony McCrossan.

== Early life ==
Roche, who was born in Conflans-Sainte-Honorine, in suburban Paris, is the son of former cycling champion Stephen Roche and his former wife, Lydia. Nicolas Roche is also the nephew of former cycling professionals Laurence Roche and Neil Martin and cousin of 2008 Irish road champion Dan Martin. In childhood he resided in both Ireland and France. He lived in Dublin from 1996 to 1999, where he was educated at the Lycée Français d'Irlande in Foxrock for two years, and Blackrock College, a private school, for one year. During this period he was a keen soccer and rugby player. He moved to southern France in 1999, where he spent most of life since.

== Career ==
=== Early years ===
He turned professional at the end of 2004, with team Cofidis and became one of the youngest UCI ProTour racers. As his father is Irish and his mother French, Roche had dual nationality as an amateur. In early 2005, Roche was told by French officials to choose between his two nationalities. Roche declared for France as he was planning to spend the rest of his life in France. The loss of Roche was a blow to Irish cycling, as he had won the 2002 Junior Tour of Ireland and finished third in the 2004 Irish Elite championship. However, six months later, the UCI and Cycling Ireland told Roche he was given incorrect information, and that he could compete for Ireland and keep his two nationalities, which he did.

During his first two years, he was often a domestique, but he did get a few good results, mostly in French Cup races. His first win as a professional was a stage in the 2004 Tour de l'Avenir, a race known as a mini-Tour de France for riders under 25. He wore the yellow jersey for two days and finished tenth overall. He was in major breakaway in the 2006 World championships in Salzburg, Austria. Soon after, he signed a two-year contract with Crédit Agricole on the back of his many good results this season.

=== Credit Agricole (2007–2008) ===
In 2007, Roche rode the Giro d'Italia. In June, he won the Irish National Time Trial Championships (CN) in Dungarvan. He came also fourth in the Road Race Championship. Due to injury, Roche withdrew from the Tour of Ireland and missed the World Championship.

Roche had planned 2008 for the Giro d'Italia but organizers RCS did not invite his team. He changed his schedule, and finished sixth in the Tour Ivoirien de la Paix, 15th in Clásica Internacional de Alcobendas in Spain and won a stage in GP Internacional Paredes Rota dos Móveis in Portugal. After finishing seventh of the Tour de Wallonie, he competed in the Beijing Olympic road race, teaming with Philip Deignan, won a stage in the Tour du Limousin, and was then picked for his first Vuelta a España. Roche had good performances in the Vuelta, nearly winning stage 18 into Las Rozas, where he was outsprinted by Imanol Erviti after a 17-man breakaway. Roche had three top-ten and ten top-20 stage finishes, finishing a fine 13th in the general classification, during what was only his second Grand Tour. Roche along with Deignan and Roger Aiken made up the Irish team for the 2008 World Championship in Varese. Roche was in an early crash and retired.

=== Ag2r (2009–2012) ===
==== 2009 ====
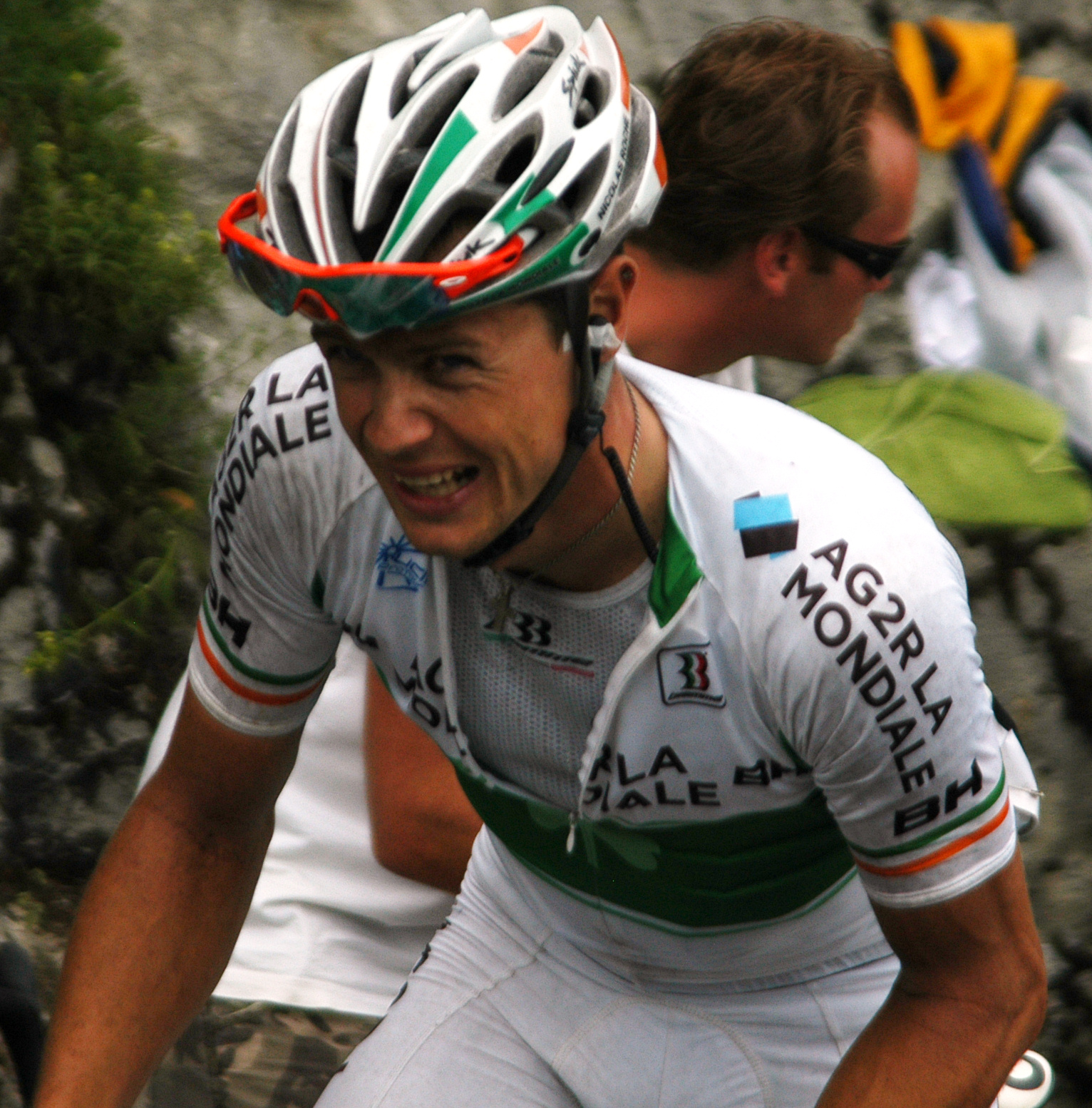
Roche at the 2009 Tour de France

Roche signed a two-year contract with Ag2r–La Mondiale following the disbandment of Crédit Agricole. For the most part of the year and after a solid performance in the Critérium du Dauphiné Libéré, Roche was in consideration for the Tour de France team and after winning the road race at the Irish National Cycling Championships for the first time in June, Roche was selected by Ag2r–La Mondiale to ride his first Tour de France the following month. He had a fine debut Tour, finishing in 23rd place overall and 5th in the points classification. He had five top ten placings in the race and finished 2nd on stage 14.

==== 2010 ====
After a good early season, where he finished 10th in Paris–Nice, 5th in the Volta a Catalunya and 2nd in the Irish National Road Race Championships, Roche was chosen as the co-leader of the Ag2r–La Mondiale team in the Tour de France and during the race he wrote articles for the Irish Independent newspaper. Roche finished 15th overall, but could have been a few ranks above had he not lost four minutes to the race leaders because of a flat tyre in stage 15.

After the Tour, Roche finished 8th in the Clásica de San Sebastián and in September, he led Ag2r–La Mondiale at the Vuelta a España. His performance was even better than during the Tour de France, as he was really close to the best climbers of the race, losing very little time in stages with a mountain top finish. He finished 7th overall however was promoted to 6th overall after Ezequiel Mosquera's second place was annulled. He finished only five minutes and three seconds behind overall winner Vincenzo Nibali. This place was the best in a Grand Tour by an Irishman since 1988. The performance lifted him to 32nd in the year end UCI World Rankings with 148 points. Roche was part of the three-man Irish team at the 2010 World Championships in September.

==== 2011 ====
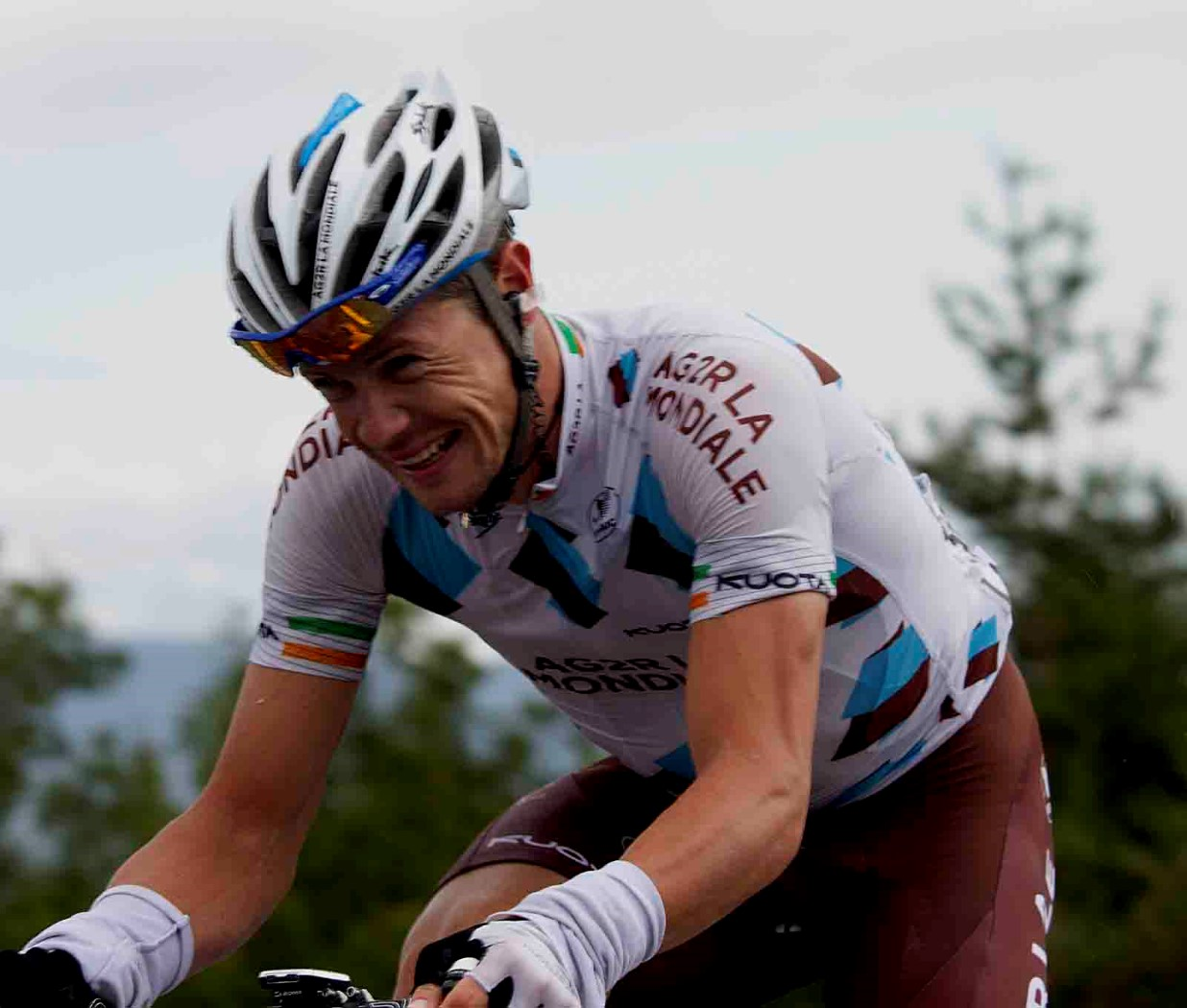
Roche at the 2011 Tour de France

Roche's season was hampered by injuries and crashes, particularly by one in the Critérium du Dauphiné He entered the Tour de France as a team leader again, but quickly realized he had not fully recovered from the crash and could not hope for a good general classification. He got in a number of unsuccessful breaks in the final week, hoping to grab a stage win, and eventually finished 26th overall. He also rode the Vuelta a España, finishing 16th overall.

In October, Roche won the 3rd stage of the inaugural Tour of Beijing. This marked his first international victory in three years and his first win on the World Tour. He finished the season world ranked 150th with 19 ranking points.

Roche published a memoir in 2011 called Inside the Peloton. It was the winner of the Sports Book category at that year's Irish Book Awards.

==== 2012 ====
Roche renounced his French citizenship in 2012, becoming solely an Irish national. He showed some form with top-20 finishes in Paris–Nice and the Tour of California. He finished 10th overall in the Tour de Suisse, and 2nd and 3rd respectively in the National Road Race and Time Trial Championships before riding the Tour de France. Roche moved up to seventh overall on the first mountain stage seven which finished on La Planche des Belles Filles. However he lost time over the time trial on stage nine and rest of the mountain stages. On stage 18, Roche broke clear of the peloton in the last 10 kilometres (6.2 miles) with Luis León Sánchez. The pair passed the day's breakaway and looked set to contest the stage win only for Mark Cavendish to sprint past in the final 200 metres (660 feet). Roche sat 11th overall heading into the time trial on stage 20 and targeted a top ten finish, but a weak time trial saw him drop a place to 12th. Roche, along with Dan Martin and David McCann, represented Ireland in the Olympic Games Road Race. He then rode the Vuelta a España where he had a good start and sat seventh overall by the second week of the race. However, he struggled through the last week of the race and dropped down to 12th overall by the end of the race.

=== Tinkoff–Saxo (2013–2014) ===
On 1 August, it was announced that Roche would leave Ag2r–La Mondiale at the end of the 2012 season, ending an eight-year association with French-registered teams. He signed a two-year contract with Saxo–Tinkoff for the 2013 and 2014 seasons.

==== 2013 ====
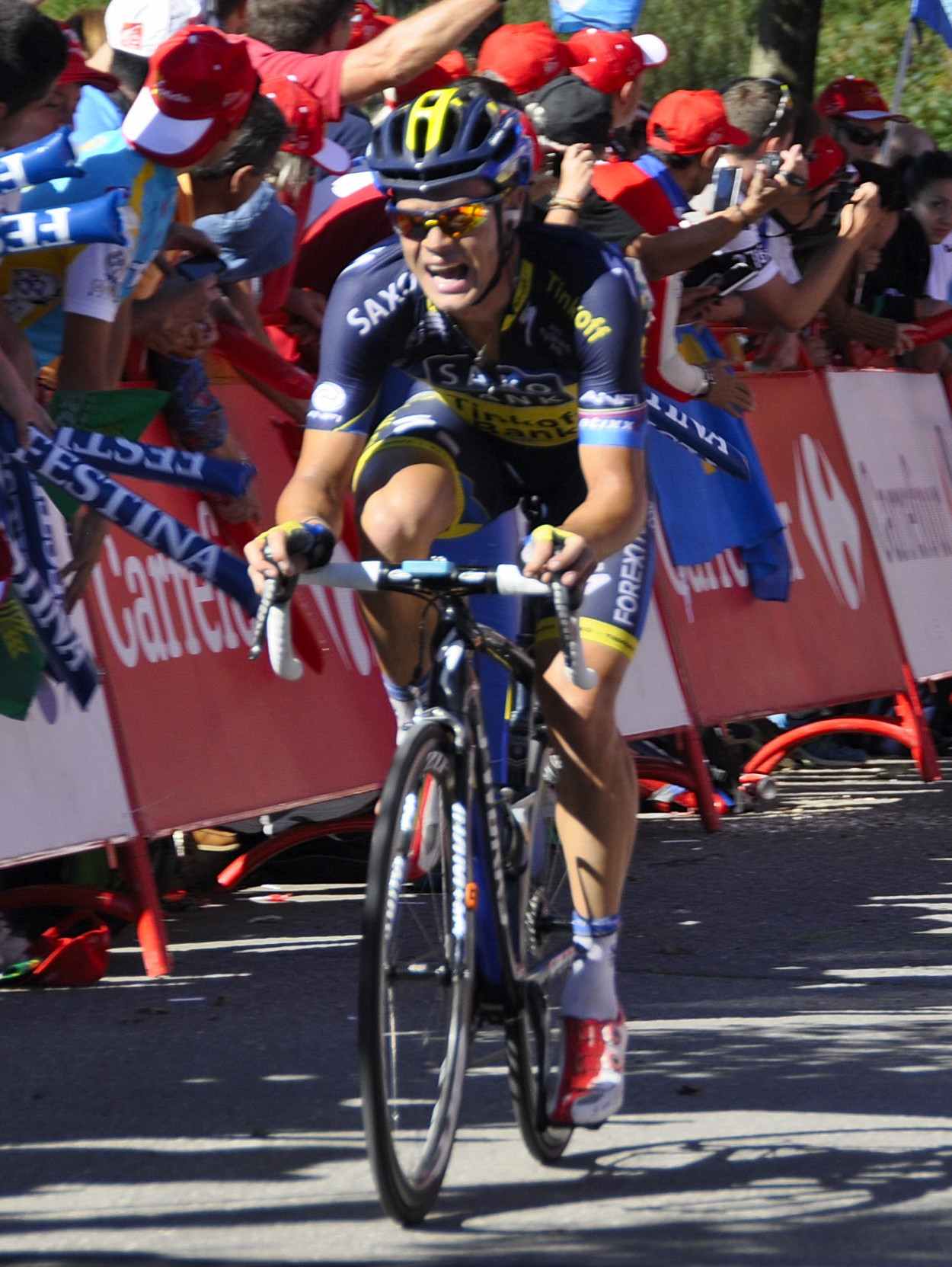
Roche at the 2013 Vuelta a España

Throughout much of the season with Saxo–Tinkoff including the Tour de France, he rode as a domestique for Alberto Contador with few results. After a good performance at the Clásica de San Sebastián finishing 5th, he was given leadership at the Vuelta a España. On 25 August, Roche won stage two of the Vuelta by breaking away with three others on the final climb at the end of the 177 km (110.0 mi) stage from Pontevedra to Alto Do Monte Da Groba. Roche held the leader's red jersey until stage 8, and also held the lead of the points, mountains and combination classifications at one stage in the race. On stage 8 Roche lost the jersey finishing eight seconds behind Daniel Moreno to fall one second behind in the general classification. After stage 13 Roche was 2nd overall but on a cold day to Andorra on stage 14 he dropped to 6th overall. He went on to finish 5th overall in the general classification, his best result to date in a Grand Tour. He would later state that he felt that the 2013 Vuelta a España was the highlight of his career. Later that year Roche again competed for Ireland in the World Championships and the World Time Trial Championships where he finished 13th.

==== 2014 ====
Roche had few early season results before participating in the Giro d'Italia which started on the island of Ireland and was given the role as co-leader with Rafał Majka. Roche also took part at the Tour de France as a domestique to Alberto Contador. Before the Tour, Roche won the overall classification of the Route du Sud ahead of Alejandro Valverde. He won the queen stage win in the process and also the points classification. This was his first stage race victory and was a race which his father also won in 1985. Roche went into the Tour of Britain expecting a good result and placed 5th overall.

=== Team Sky (2015–2016) ===
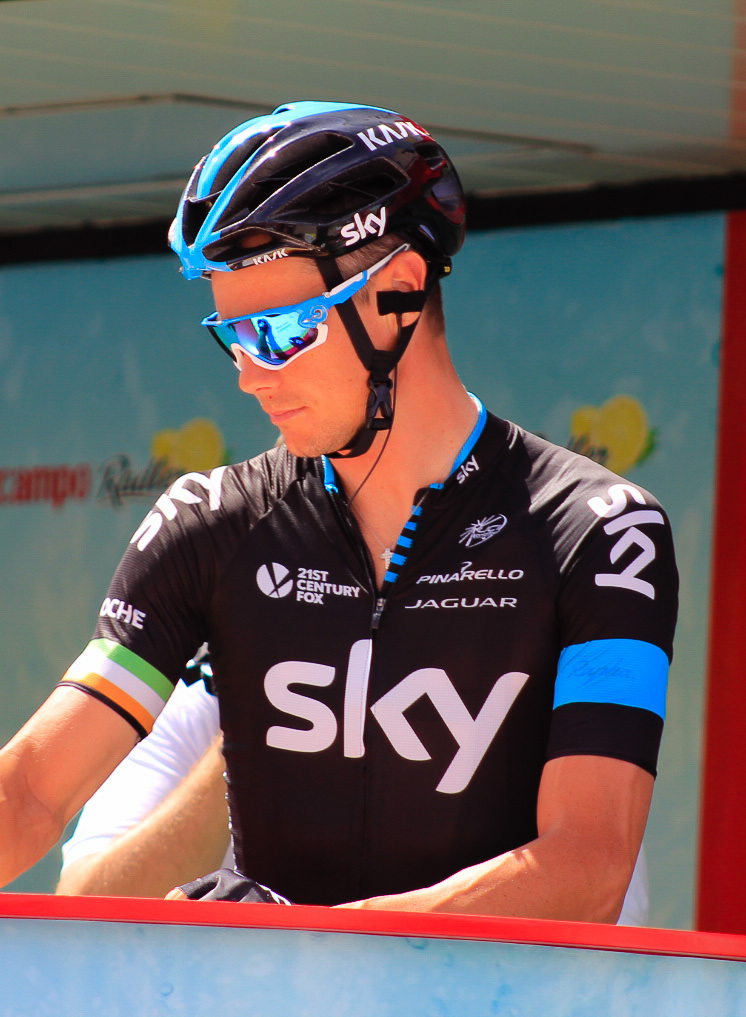
Roche at the 2015 Vuelta a España

==== 2015 ====
In 2015, Roche left Tinkoff–Saxo to join Team Sky. On 10 September, Roche won stage 18 of the Vuelta a España in a sprint finish against Haimar Zubeldia.

==== 2016 ====
After a disrupted winter training due to more than one spider infection while riding, Roche struggled with few early season results. At the end of April Roche competed in the Tour de Yorkshire looking for a good result. On the final stage Roche attacked a group of favourites alongside Thomas Voeckler where he was beaten in the final sprint to the line. This gave him 2nd place overall in the general classification. After this race it was confirmed that Roche would take part in the Giro d'Italia for a third time in his career. Roche started the race as a backup general classification rider to Mikel Landa in the first five days of racing, where he was placed in the top 10 overall. His form faded over the race but helped his teammate Mikel Nieve win the mountains classification. In June Roche completed the double at the Irish National Cycling Championships winning the time trial ahead of Eddie Dunbar and Ryan Mullen, and winning the road race ahead of Matt Brammeier. However, he was not selected for the Tour de France, having started the previous seven editions of the race from 2009 to 2015.

=== BMC Racing Team (2017–2018) ===
After leaving Team Sky, Roche joined the BMC Racing Team for the 2017 and 2018 seasons.

=== Team Sunweb (2019–2021) ===
In September 2018 he confirmed that he had agreed a contract with Team Sunweb for 2019, with a role as a domestique for Tom Dumoulin in the latter's effort to win the Tour de France.

Roche took the Red Jersey on Stage 2 of the 2019 Vuelta a España after being part of a six-man group who attacked in the final kilometres of the stage. He held the jersey until Stage 5, however he crashed out on stage 6, being one of four riders to abandon due to the crash. He was fifth in the general classification at the start of the stage.

In September 2019 it was announced that Roche had extended his contract with Team Sunweb for a further two years.

On 27 May 2021 he finished 3rd on Stage 18 of the Giro d'Italia.

Roche retired from road racing competition after the Irish National Cycling Championships in October 2021.

=== Gravel Cycling ===
In October 2022, Roche set up his own gravel cycling team, NR GRVL. In May 2023, Roche took a third-place finish at the UCI Gravel World Series event in Nannup, Western Australia.

=== Post-road racing ===
Following his retirement, Roche became a directeur sportif for UCI Continental team Trinity Racing, leading the team at the 2022 Rás Tailteann.

== Personal life ==
Roche currently resides in Monaco, having previously lived in Varese, Italy until 2013. He married Spaniard Deborah Robles on 23 October 2015, the couple split two years later in September 2017. They have one child together. Roche co-owns Roca Sports, a bicycle shop in County Cork.

=== Dancing with the Stars ===
In 2022, Roche appeared on the fifth series of the Irish version of Dancing With the Stars. He was partnered with professional dancer Karen Byrne. They were eliminated at the quarter-final stage, finishing in 6th place (with an average of 17.4 points), after losing the dance-off to Ellen Keane and Ervinas Merfeldas.

Performances

Week No.	Dance/Song	Judges' score			Total	Result
Week No.	Dance/Song	Redmond	Barry	Gourounlian	Total	Result
1	Jive / "Blinding Lights"	3	4	4	11	No elimination
2	No dance performed	—N/a	—N/a	—N/a	—N/a	No elimination
3	Viennese waltz / "Unplayed Piano"	5	5	6	16	Safe
4	American Smooth / "Singin' in the Rain"	6	6	7	19	Safe
5	Samba / "Fantasy"	5	5	5	15	Safe
6	Quickstep / "Hey Brother"	6	6	7	19	No elimination
7	Waltz / "Love Ain't Here Anymore"	5	6	6	17	Safe
8	Tango / No dance performed	—N/a	—N/a	—N/a	—N/a	Given bye
9	Tango / "Trumpet Tango"	7	7	7	21	Safe
10	Foxtrot / "I Love Paris"	7	7	7	21	Eliminated
10	Team Dance / "Cuba"	9	9	9	27	Eliminated

== Major results ==
2004
2nd Overall Tour du Loir-et-Cher
3rd Road race, National Road Championships
8th Overall Ronde de l'Isard
8th Paris–Mantes-en-Yvelines
9th Tour du Jura
10th Grand Prix d'Isbergues
2005
4th Tour de Vendée
6th Tour du Finistère
2006 (1 pro win)
4th Road race, National Road Championships
4th Overall Paris–Corrèze
8th Polynormande
10th Overall Tour de l'Avenir

1st Stage 4

10th Paris–Camembert
2007 (1)
National Road Championships

1st Time trial
4th Road race

5th Polynormande
6th Grand Prix de Denain
9th Paris–Camembert
9th Tro-Bro Léon
2008 (2)
1st Stage 1 GP Internacional Paredes Rota dos Móveis
1st Stage 1 Tour du Limousin
4th Road race, National Road Championships
6th Overall Tour Ivoirien de la Paix
6th Rund um den Henninger-Turm
7th Overall Tour de Wallonie
8th Paris–Camembert
2009 (1)
1st Road race, National Road Championships
2010
2nd Road race, National Road Championships
3rd Gran Premio dell'Insubria-Lugano
4th Grand Prix of Aargau Canton
5th Overall Volta a Catalunya
6th Overall Vuelta a España
8th Clásica de San Sebastián
10th Overall Paris–Nice
2011 (1)
1st Stage 3 Tour of Beijing
4th Road race, National Road Championships
5th Giro del Piemonte
8th Gran Premio Industria e Commercio di Prato
10th Paris–Camembert
2012
National Road Championships

2nd Road race
3rd Time trial

10th Overall Tour de Suisse
2013 (1)
5th Overall Vuelta a España

1st Stage 2
Held after Stage 8
Held after Stages 2–3
Held after Stages 2–9
Held after Stages 2–8 & 11–13

5th Overall Tour Méditerranéen
5th Clásica de San Sebastián
2014 (2)
1st Overall Route du Sud

1st Points classification
1st Stage 2

5th Overall Tour of Britain
Combativity award Stage 11 Tour de France
2015 (1)
1st Stage 18 Vuelta a España
1st Stage 1 (TTT) Tour de Romandie
2016 (2)
National Road Championships

1st Road race
1st Time trial

2nd Overall Abu Dhabi Tour
2nd Overall Tour de Yorkshire
6th Overall Tour of Britain
8th Time trial, UEC European Road Championships
9th Clásica de San Sebastián
2017
Vuelta a España

1st Stage 1 (TTT)
Held after Stages 1–2

1st Stage 1 (TTT) Volta a la Comunitat Valenciana
National Road Championships

2nd Time trial
4th Road race

3rd Overall Tour of Guangxi
4th Giro dell'Emilia
10th Clásica de San Sebastián
2018
4th Japan Cup
5th Overall Arctic Race of Norway
10th Overall Tour of Turkey
2019
10th Overall Tour de Suisse
Vuelta a España

Held after Stages 2–4

2020
National Road Championships

2nd Road race
2nd Time trial

7th Overall Tour des Alpes-Maritimes et du Var
Combativity award Stage 6 Tour de France
2021
2nd Time trial, National Road Championships

=== Grand Tour general classification results timeline ===
Grand Tour	2007	2008	2009	2010	2011	2012	2013	2014	2015	2016	2017	2018	2019	2020	2021
Giro d'Italia	123	—	—	—	—	—	—	30	—	24	—	DNF	—	—	59
Tour de France	—	—	22	14	25	12	40	39	35	—	33	—	45	64	—
/ Vuelta a España	—	13	—	6	16	12	5	—	26	—	14	40	DNF	—	—

Legend
—	Did not compete
DNF	Did not finish
