= 2007 GP Ouest-France =

The 2007 edition of the GP Ouest-France was held on September 2 in and around the French village of Plouay in Brittany. Several laps of a circuit were completed for a total of 226 kilometres of racing. Although no significant breakaway was able to last, a late break by Thomas Voeckler proved decisive. Voekler's remarkable drive kept him just ahead of the onrushing pack of sprinters two seconds later. A native son of France and French hero of the 2004 Tour de France, Voeckler's win was very popular with the crowd.

== General Classification ==
=== 02-09-2007: Plouay, 226 km. ===
	Cyclist	Team	Time	UCI Points
1	Thomas Voeckler (FRA)	Bouygues Télécom	5h 32' 47"	40
2	Thor Hushovd (NOR)	Crédit Agricole	+ 2"	30
3	Danilo Di Luca (ITA)	Liquigas	+ 2"	25
4	Filippo Pozzato (ITA)	Liquigas	+ 2"	20
5	Steven de Jongh (NED)	Quick-Step–Innergetic	+ 2"	15
6	Matthieu Sprick (FRA)	Bouygues Télécom	+ 2"	11
7	Rinaldo Nocentini (ITA)	AG2R Prévoyance	+ 2"	7
8	Carlo Scognamiglio (ITA)	Team Milram	+ 2"	5
9	Manuele Mori (ITA)	Saunier Duval–Prodir	+ 2"	3
10	Arnaud Gérard (FRA)	Française des Jeux	+ 2"	1
