= 2010 Giro di Lombardia =

Giro di Lombardia
2010 UCI World Ranking, race 26 of 26

Race details
- Dates: 16 October 2010
- Stages: 1
- Distance: 260 km (160 mi)

Results
	Winner	Philippe Gilbert (BEL)	(Omega Pharma–Lotto)
	Second	Michele Scarponi (ITA)	(Androni Giocattoli)
	Third	Pablo Lastras (ESP)	(Caisse d'Epargne)

The 2010 Giro di Lombardia was the 104th edition of this single-day classic cycling race, colloquially known as the "Race of the Falling Leaves". The event took place 16 October 2010. It was the final event of the 2010 UCI World Ranking and the final major event of the 2010 road racing season. The race was 260 kilometres (160 mi) long from its start in Milan to its finish in Como.

Notable features of this race include that it runs around picturesque Lake Como in Northern Italy and includes the Madonna del Ghisallo climb (511 m of elevation gain). At the top of this climb sits the shrine of Madonna del Ghisallo (the patron saint of cyclists) that contains a large amount of cycling memorabilia. After the Madonna del Ghisallo, a new climb, the Colma di Sormano (1124 m altitude) is included in the route, replacing the Civiglio climb.

== Teams ==
- Ag2r–La Mondiale
- Astana
- Caisse d'Epargne
- Euskaltel–Euskadi
- Footon–Servetto–Fuji
- Française des Jeux
- Garmin–Transitions
- Lampre–Farnese
- Liquigas–Doimo
- Omega Pharma–Lotto
- Quick-Step
- Rabobank
- Team Sky
- Team HTC–Columbia
- Team Katusha
- Team Milram
- Team RadioShack
- Team Saxo Bank
- Acqua & Sapone
- Androni Giocattoli
- Bbox Bouygues Telecom
- BMC Racing Team
- Carmiooro NGC
- Cervélo TestTeam
- Cofidis
- Colnago–CSF Inox
- ISD–NERI

== Results ==
	Cyclist	Team	Time	UCI World Ranking points
1	Philippe Gilbert (BEL)	Omega Pharma–Lotto	6h 46' 33"	100
2	Michele Scarponi (ITA)	Androni Giocattoli	+ 12"	80
3	Pablo Lastras (ESP)	Caisse d'Epargne	+ 55"	70
4	Jakob Fuglsang (DEN)	Team Saxo Bank	+ 1' 08"	60
5	Vincenzo Nibali (ITA)	Liquigas–Doimo	+ 1' 08"	50
6	Samuel Sánchez (ESP)	Euskaltel–Euskadi	+ 1' 12"	40
7	Mikel Nieve (ESP)	Euskaltel–Euskadi	+ 2' 07"	30
8	Mauro Santambrogio (ITA)	BMC Racing Team	+ 3' 01"	20
9	Carlos Barredo (ESP)	Quick-Step	+ 3' 25"	10
10	Giampaolo Caruso (ITA)	Team Katusha	+ 3' 50"	4
