= 2010 Clásica de San Sebastián =

2010 UCI World Ranking, race 18 of 26

Race details
- Dates: July 31, 2010
- Stages: 1
- Distance: 234 km (145 mi)
- Winning time: 5h 47' 13"

Results
	Winner	Luis León Sánchez (ESP)	(Caisse d'Epargne)
	Second	Alexander Vinokourov (KAZ)	(Astana)
	Third	Carlos Sastre (ESP)	(Cervélo TestTeam)

The 2010 Clásica de San Sebastián was the 30th edition of the Clásica de San Sebastián road cycling race. It took place on 31 July 2010, and will be the tenth event of the 2010 UCI ProTour, and the eighteenth event in the inaugural UCI World Ranking series. It started and finished in San Sebastián, in the Basque Country, Spain. The race covered 234 km (145.4 mi), mainly to the south and east of the city, and entirely within the province of Guipúzcoa.

== Teams and riders ==
As the race is under the auspices of the UCI ProTour, all eighteen ProTour teams are invited automatically. Three additional wildcard invitations were given to form the event's 21-team peloton.

The 21 teams invited to the race were:

- Ag2r–La Mondiale
- Andalucía–Cajasur
- Astana
- Caisse d'Epargne
- Cervélo TestTeam
- Euskaltel–Euskadi
- Footon–Servetto–Fuji
- Française des Jeux
- Garmin–Transitions
- Lampre–Farnese Vini
- Liquigas–Doimo
- Omega Pharma–Lotto
- Quick-Step
- Rabobank
- Team HTC–Columbia
- Team Katusha
- Team Milram
- Team RadioShack
- Team Saxo Bank
- Team Sky
- Xacobeo–Galicia

Teams consisted of up to eight riders, and 168 riders started the event. The event took place less than a week after the conclusion of the 2010 Tour de France, and many of the riders who took part in that event, are scheduled for this race.

== Route ==
The route is an anticlockwise loop, heading southwest from San Sebastián, reaching its highest point, and its farthest from the city at the Alto de Udana (574 m). It then heads back towards the southern suburbs of the start town, before heading east through the Jaizkibel mountains to Hondarribia on the French border, and then back to San Sebastián.

== Categories ==
As well as the overall race, there were prizes available for amassing most points at five intermediate sprints around the course, and for gaining points at the top of six mountain passes and hilltops.

== General Standings ==
Rank	Cyclist	Team	Time	UCI World Ranking Points
1	Luis León Sánchez (ESP)	Caisse d'Epargne	5h 47' 13"	80
2	Alexander Vinokourov (KAZ)	Astana	s.t.	60
3	Carlos Sastre (ESP)	Cervélo TestTeam	s.t.	50
4	Haimar Zubeldia (ESP)	Team RadioShack	+ 34"	40
5	Joaquim Rodríguez (ESP)	Team Katusha	+ 37"	30
6	Ryder Hesjedal (CAN)	Garmin–Transitions	+ 37"	22
7	Robert Gesink (NED)	Rabobank	+ 37"	14
8	Nicolas Roche (IRL)	Ag2r–La Mondiale	+ 37"	10
9	Samuel Sánchez (ESP)	Euskaltel–Euskadi	+ 37"	6
10	Richie Porte (AUS)	Team Saxo Bank	+ 37"	2
