= 2010 Gent–Wevelgem =

2010 UCI World Ranking, race 6 of 26
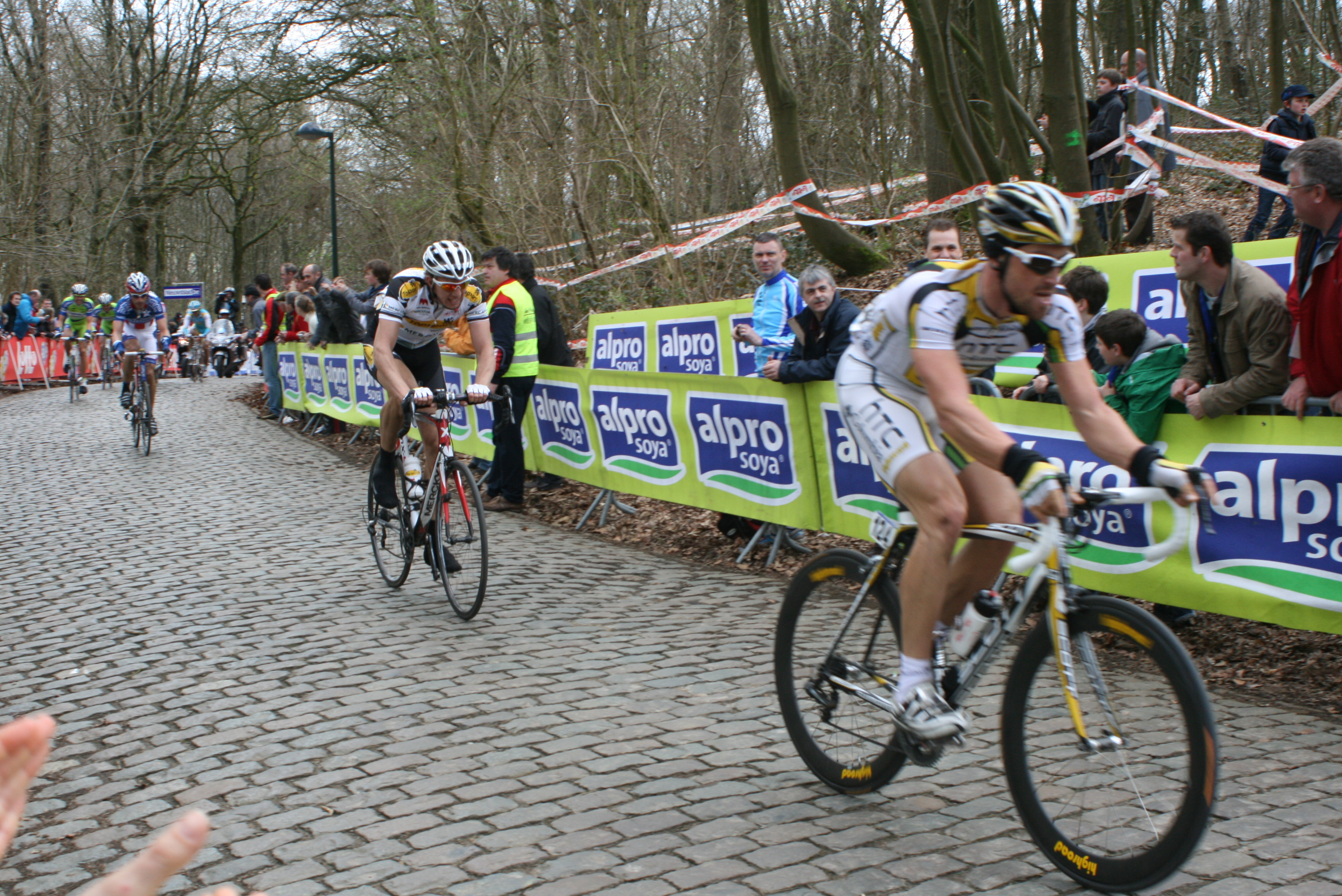

Race details
- Dates: 28 March 2010
- Stages: 1
- Distance: 219 km (136 mi)
- Winning time: 5h 16' 21"

Results
	Winner	Bernhard Eisel (AUT)	(Team HTC–Columbia)
	Second	Sep Vanmarcke (BEL)	(Topsport Vlaanderen–Mercator)
	Third	Philippe Gilbert (BEL)	(Omega Pharma–Lotto)

The 2010 Gent–Wevelgem cycle road race took place on 28 March 2010 between Deinze and Wevelgem. It was the 72nd edition of the international Belgian top classic Gent–Wevelgem. An extra track was added in France, with a double passage over Mont des Cats and Mont Noir. The race was the sixth event in the UCI World Ranking. It was won by Bernhard Eisel of the HTC–Columbia team.

Bernhard Eisel (AUT) beat Sep Vanmarcke of Belgium in a six-way sprint to the finish. One of the pre-race favourites Philippe Gilbert finished third ahead of American veteran George Hincapie. The other pre-race favourites Tom Boonen and Fabian Cancellara both dropped out in the middle of the race. Eisel commented after the race, "Until now I never liked this race. The wind and all is not my thing. But from this day on Gent–Wevelgem is going to become my great love."

== Teams ==
There were 25 teams in the 2010 Gent–Wevelgem. They were:

ProTour Teams

- Ag2r–La Mondiale
- Astana
- Caisse d'Epargne
- Euskaltel–Euskadi
- Footon–Servetto–Fuji
- Française des Jeux
- Garmin–Transitions
- Lampre–Farnese Vini
- Liquigas–Doimo
- Omega Pharma–Lotto
- Quick-Step
- Rabobank
- Team Sky
- Team HTC–Columbia
- Team Katusha
- Team Milram
- Team RadioShack
- Team Saxo Bank

Wild Cards

- Landbouwkrediet
- Topsport Vlaanderen–Mercator
- Acqua & Sapone
- Skil–Shimano
- Vacansoleil
- Cervélo TestTeam
- BMC Racing Team

== Results ==
	Cyclist	Team	Time	UCI World Ranking Points
1	Bernhard Eisel (AUT)	Team HTC–Columbia	5h 16' 21"	80
2	Sep Vanmarcke (BEL)	Topsport Vlaanderen–Mercator	st.	60
3	Philippe Gilbert (BEL)	Omega Pharma–Lotto	st.	50
4	George Hincapie (USA)	BMC Racing Team	st.	40
5	Daniel Oss (ITA)	Liquigas–Doimo	+ 2"	30
6	Jürgen Roelandts (BEL)	Omega Pharma–Lotto	+ 6"	22
7	Maxim Iglinskiy (KAZ)	Astana	+ 51"	14
8	Matti Breschel (DEN)	Team Saxo Bank	+ 1' 00"	10
9	Tyler Farrar (USA)	Garmin–Transitions	s.t.	6
10	Luca Paolini (ITA)	Acqua & Sapone	s.t.	2

== See also ==
- 2010 in Road Cycling
