= 2010 Grand Prix Cycliste de Québec =

2010 UCI World Ranking, race 24 of 26

Race details
- Dates: September 10
- Stages: 1
- Distance: 189 km (117.4 mi)
- Winning time: 4h 35' 26"

Results
	Winner	Thomas Voeckler (FRA)	(Bbox Bouygues Telecom)
	Second	Edvald Boasson Hagen (NOR)	(Team Sky)
	Third	Robert Gesink (NED)	(Rabobank)

The 2010 Grand Prix Cycliste de Québec was the first edition of the Grand Prix Cycliste de Québec, one-day professional bicycle road race held in Québec City, Quebec, Canada. It was held on September 10 as the penultimate event in the 2010 UCI ProTour. With the 2010 Grand Prix Cycliste de Montréal held two days later on September 12, 2010, the 2010 edition was one of only two stops in North America for the 2010 UCI ProTour. It is part of the UCI World Ranking.

== Course ==
The course consisted of 15 laps a 12 km circuit. During the International Cycling Union's visit in 2009, they ranked the course as "demanding" from a technical point of view as Québec City is very hilly, and "exceptional" for the beauty of its setting.

This circuit was well-suited for climbers and those who are used to steep descents. The finish was on an uphill climb.

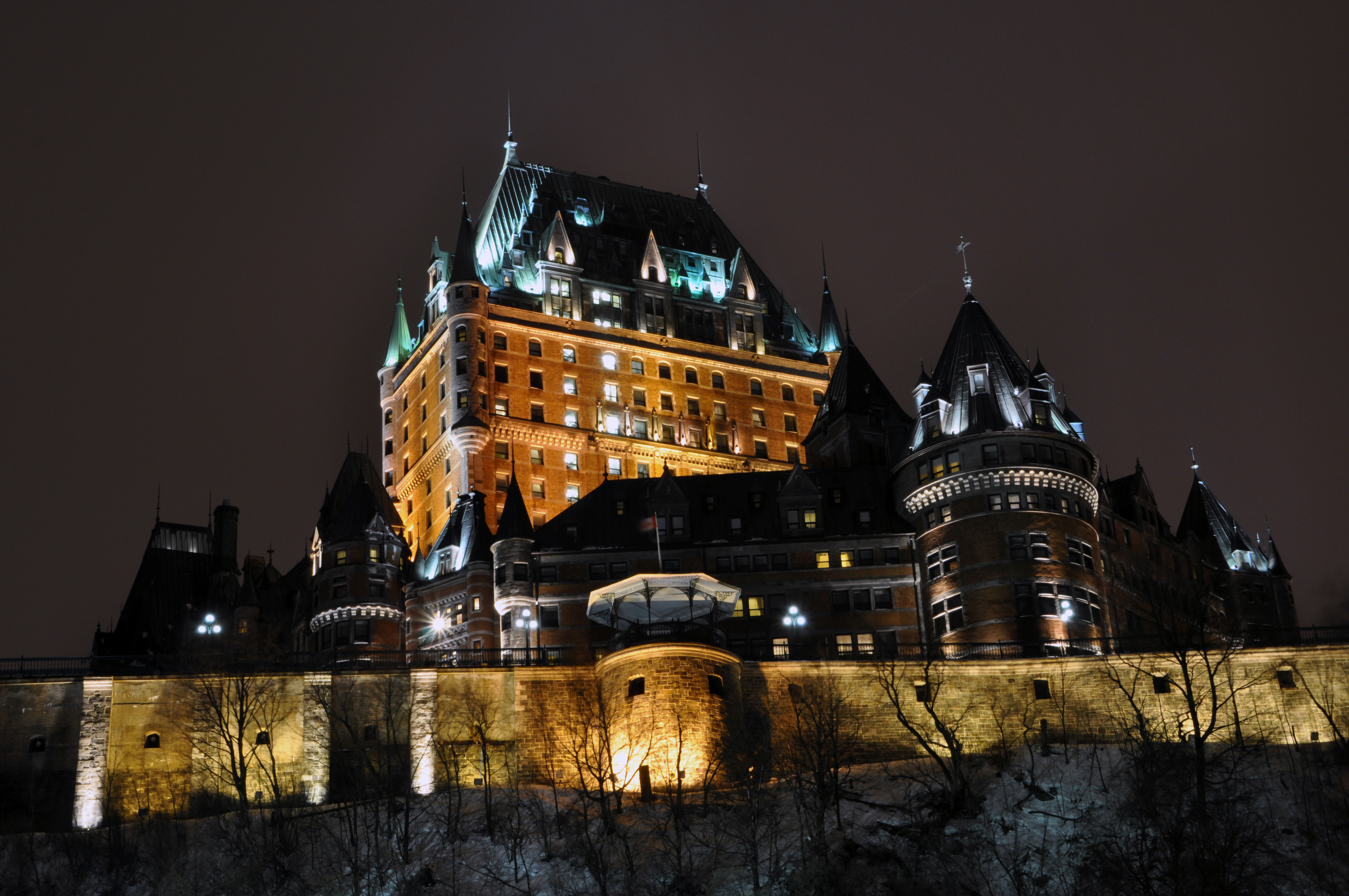
Le Château Frontenac is located in the heart of Old Québec and is the official hotel for cyclists of the 2010 Grand Prix Cycliste de Québec

== Teams ==
Twenty One teams had been invited to the 2010 Grand Prix Cycliste de Québec

Teams from the UCI Pro Tour

- Ag2r–La Mondiale
- Astana
- Caisse d'Epargne
- Euskaltel–Euskadi
- Footon–Servetto–Fuji
- Française des Jeux
- Garmin–Transitions
- Lampre–Farnese
- Liquigas–Doimo
- Omega Pharma–Lotto
- Quick-Step
- Rabobank
- Team Sky
- Team HTC–Columbia
- Team Katusha
- Team Milram
- Team RadioShack
- Team Saxo Bank

Teams awarded a wildcard invitation

- Bbox Bouygues Telecom
- BMC Racing Team
- Cofidis

== Results ==
	Cyclist	Team	Time	UCI World Ranking Points
1	Thomas Voeckler (FRA)	Bbox Bouygues Telecom	4h 35' 26"	80
2	Edvald Boasson Hagen (NOR)	Team Sky	+ 2"	60
3	Robert Gesink (NED)	Rabobank	+ 2"	50
4	Ryder Hesjedal (CAN)	Garmin–Transitions	+ 2"	40
5	Staf Scheirlinckx (BEL)	Omega Pharma–Lotto	+ 2"	30
6	Alessandro Ballan (ITA)	BMC Racing Team	+ 2"	20
7	Fabian Wegmann (GER)	Team Milram	+ 2"	10
8	Maxime Monfort (BEL)	Team HTC–Columbia	+ 2"	8
9	Francesco Reda (ITA)	Quick-Step	+ 2"	6
10	Damiano Cunego (ITA)	Lampre–Farnese	+ 2"	2
