= 2010 Liège–Bastogne–Liège =

2010 UCI World Ranking, race 12 of 26

Race details
- Dates: April 25
- Stages: 1
- Distance: 258 km (160 mi)
- Winning time: 6h 37' 48"

Results
	Winner	Alexander Vinokourov (KAZ)	(Astana)
	Second	Alexandr Kolobnev (RUS)	(Team Katusha)
	Third	Philippe Gilbert (BEL)	(Omega Pharma–Lotto)

The 2010 Liège–Bastogne–Liège monument classic cycling race took place on April 25, 2010. This race was won by Alexander Vinokourov after slipping into a breakaway with Alexandr Kolobnev. Vinokourov attacked on the last hill with under 500m to go to take the victory. Alejandro Valverde, the winner in 2006 and 2008, finished third in the race, but was stripped of the result as a result of a doping suspension applied on May 31, 2010.

== Results ==
All riders from third place onwards promoted by one place following the retroactive suspension of Alejandro Valverde

	Cyclist	Team	Time
1	Alexander Vinokourov (KAZ)	Astana	6h 37' 48"
2	Alexandr Kolobnev (RUS)	Team Katusha	+ 6"
3	Philippe Gilbert (BEL)	Omega Pharma–Lotto	+ 1' 04"
4	Cadel Evans (AUS)	BMC Racing Team	+ 1' 04"
5	Andy Schleck (LUX)	Team Saxo Bank	+ 1' 07"
6	Igor Antón (ESP)	Euskaltel–Euskadi	+ 1' 07"
7	Chris Horner (USA)	Team RadioShack	+ 1' 07"
8	Fränk Schleck (LUX)	Team Saxo Bank	+ 1' 07"
9	Alberto Contador (ESP)	Astana	+ 1' 07"
10	Thomas Voeckler (FRA)	Bbox Bouygues Telecom	+ 1' 18"

== Controversy ==
On December 6, 2011, Swiss magazine l'Illustre published an email correspondence between the winner and runner-up that suggests Vinokourov paid Kolobnev €100,000 not to contest the final sprint. While Kolobnev has not commented on the allegations, Vinokourov has denied them, claiming that the payment was part of his "private life", and that he "makes payments left and right" but "never offered to buy the win from Kolobnev". On December 7, Vinokourov announced legal action against l'Illustre for an "invasion of privacy", and threatened further litigation against "anyone who infringes on [his] integrity".

On December 8, the UCI, whose rules specifically ban "collusion or behavior likely to falsify or go against the interests of the competition", announced it would investigate the incident.

Both riders were later charged with bribery by Belgian authorities.
