= 2010 Amstel Gold Race =

2010 UCI ProTour 2010 UCI World Ranking, race 10 of 26

Race details
- Dates: April 18
- Stages: 1
- Distance: 257.4 km (159.9 mi)

Results
	Winner	Philippe Gilbert (BEL)	(Omega Pharma–Lotto)
	Second	Ryder Hesjedal (CAN)	(Garmin–Transitions)
	Third	Enrico Gasparotto (ITA)	(Astana)

The 2010 Amstel Gold Race was the 45th edition of the Amstel Gold Race classic cycle race and took place on April 18, 2010. It was held on a 257.4 kilometres (159.9 mi) course from Maastricht to Cauberg as the sixth event of the 2010 UCI ProTour and the tenth event in the UCI World Ranking series. The race was won by Philippe Gilbert, ending a 16-year wait for a Belgian victory in the race.

== Teams ==
As the Amstel Gold Race is a UCI ProTour event, the 18 ProTour teams are automatically invited and obligated to send a squad. Six UCI Professional Continental teams round out the race's 24-team peloton.

- Ag2r–La Mondiale
- Astana
- BMC Racing Team
- Caisse d'Epargne
- Cervélo TestTeam
- Euskaltel–Euskadi
- Footon–Servetto–Fuji
- Française des Jeux
- Garmin–Transitions
- Lampre–Farnese Vini
- Landbouwkrediet
- Liquigas–Doimo
- Omega Pharma–Lotto
- Quick-Step
- Rabobank
- Skil–Shimano
- Team HTC–Columbia
- Team Katusha
- Team Milram
- Team RadioShack
- Team Saxo Bank
- Team Sky
- Topsport Vlaanderen–Mercator
- Vacansoleil

Several riders who planned to compete in the race were unable to make it to Maastricht because of the colossal ash cloud formed by the eruption of the Icelandic Volcano Eyjafjallajökull, which grounded flights throughout Europe. The team most affected was Caisse d'Epargne, whose leaders Alejandro Valverde and Luis León Sánchez, as well as several others, were all unable to make it to the race. They start the race with only José Vicente García, Imanol Erviti and David López available to ride instead of the customary eight riders, and needed special permission from the UCI to allow them such a small squad. Team Sky's Bradley Wiggins, Cervélo TestTeam captain Carlos Sastre, and the Team HTC-Columbia duo of Craig Lewis and Vicente Reynès, all of whom reside in Spain, were also unable to get to Maastricht in time for the race.

There was also talk that helicopters providing live images of the race would be grounded because of the ash cloud, but the race received special permission from the Dutch transportation minister for the helicopters to fly during the race.

== Result ==
	Rider	Team	Time
1	Philippe Gilbert (BEL)	Omega Pharma–Lotto	6h 22' 54"
2	Ryder Hesjedal (CAN)	Garmin–Transitions	+ 2"
3	Enrico Gasparotto (ITA)	Astana	+ 2"
4	Bert De Waele (BEL)	Landbouwkrediet	+ 5"
5	Roman Kreuziger (CZE)	Liquigas–Doimo	+ 5"
6	Damiano Cunego (ITA)	Lampre–Farnese Vini	+ 5"
7	Fränk Schleck (LUX)	Team Saxo Bank	+ 7"
8	Marco Marcato (ITA)	Vacansoleil	+ 9"
9	Karsten Kroon (NLD)	BMC Racing Team	+ 11"
10	Chris Horner (USA)	Team RadioShack	+ 11"
