= Grand Prix Cycliste de Montréal =

Canadian one-day road cycling race

- 2026 Grand Prix Cycliste de Montréal

Race details
- Date: September
- Region: Montreal, Quebec, Canada
- Local name: Grand Prix Cycliste de Montréal
- Discipline: Road
- Competition: UCI World Tour
- Type: One-day race
- Organiser: Évenements GPCQM (AA+ EVT inc)
- Race director: Joseph Limare
- Web site: gpcqm.ca

History
- First edition: 2010
- Editions: 15
- First winner: Robert Gesink (NED)
- Most wins: Greg Van Avermaet (BEL); Tadej Pogačar (SLO) (2)
- Most recent: Isaac Del Toro (MEX)

The Grand Prix Cycliste de Montréal is a one-day professional bicycle road race held in Montreal, Quebec, Canada. Its first edition was held on September 12, 2010, as the final event in the 2010 UCI ProTour.

The Grand Prix Cycliste de Montréal and the Grand Prix Cycliste de Québec, held two days earlier, are collectively known as the "Laurentian Classics". In 2014, Simon Gerrans became the first to achieve the "Laurentian Double" by winning both the Grand Prix Cycliste de Québec and the Grand Prix Cycliste de Montréal in the same year. In 2018, Michael Matthews became the second cyclist to achieve this.

The race uses a hilly circuit around Mount Royal, similar to that used at the 1974 UCI Road World Championships, 1976 Summer Olympics and other previous races. In 2024, organisers noted that they wished to stage a women's race in future, potentially as part of the UCI Women's World Tour. In September 2026, the 2026 UCI Road World Championships was held on a similar course to the race.

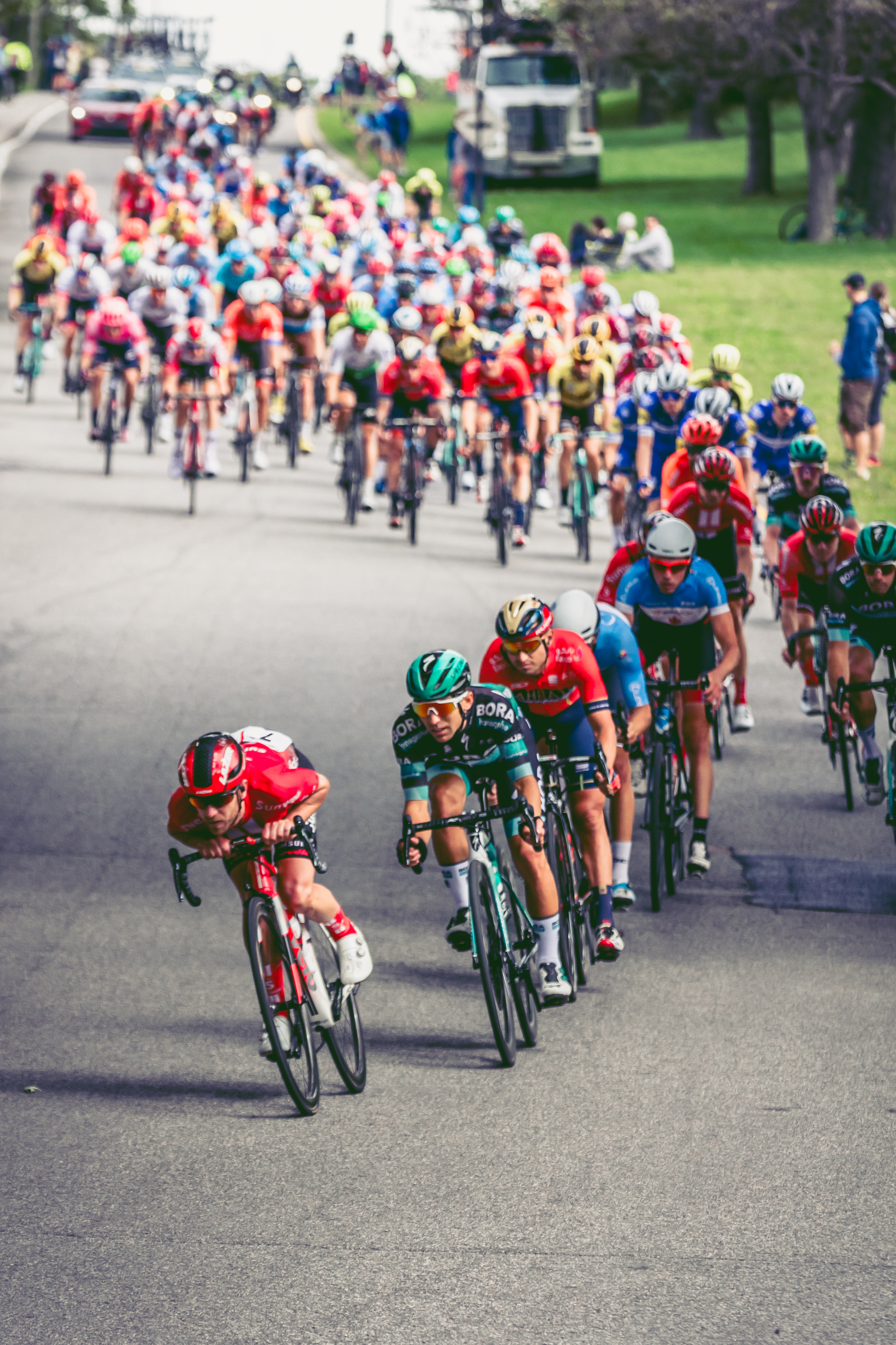
The peloton descending Mont Royal during the 2019 edition

== Route ==
The Grand Prix Cycliste de Montréal is not like many single day events, a point to point race, but a circuit based race. The riders race for 18 laps on a 12.3 kilometres (7.6 mi) long circuit. Each lap of the circuit requires completing four climbs on the slopes around Mount Royal: Côte Camilien-Houde (1.8 km long and 8% average grade), Côte de la Polytechnique (780m long and 6% average grade) and Avenue du Parc (560m long and 4% average grade) and (as of 2022) the new section on Pagnuelo street (534m long at 7.5% average grade). The finish is uphill on the Avenue du Parc.

The race has 4,842 metres (15,886 ft) of cumulative climbing, similar to that found in a mountain stage in the Tour de France, though at a lower altitude.

Iterations of the circuit have been used for:

- 1974 UCI Road World Championships, when Eddy Merckx won
- 1976 Summer Olympics
- Grand Prix des Amériques, held between 1989 and 1992, part of the UCI Road World Cup
- Coupe du Monde Cycliste Féminine de Montréal, held between 1998 and 2009, part of the UCI Women's Road World Cup

== Winners ==
Year	Country	Rider	Team
2010	Netherlands	Robert Gesink	Rabobank
2011	Portugal	Rui Costa	Movistar Team
2012	Norway	Lars Petter Nordhaug	Team Sky
2013	Slovakia	Peter Sagan	Cannondale
2014	Australia	Simon Gerrans	Orica–GreenEDGE
2015	Belgium	Tim Wellens	Lotto–Soudal
2016	Belgium	Greg Van Avermaet	BMC Racing Team
2017	Italy	Diego Ulissi	UAE Team Emirates
2018	Australia	Michael Matthews	Team Sunweb
2019	Belgium	Greg Van Avermaet	CCC Team
2020–2021	No race due to the COVID-19 pandemic		
2022	Slovenia	Tadej Pogačar	UAE Team Emirates
2023	Great Britain	Adam Yates	UAE Team Emirates
2024	Slovenia	Tadej Pogačar	UAE Team Emirates
2025	United States	Brandon McNulty	UAE Team Emirates XRG
2026	Mexico	Isaac Del Toro	UAE Team Emirates XRG

=== Multiple winners ===
Wins	Rider	Editions
2	Greg Van Avermaet (BEL)	2016, 2019
2	Tadej Pogačar (SLO)	2022, 2024

=== Wins per country ===
Wins	Country
3	Belgium
2	Australia; Slovenia
1	Italy; Mexico; Netherlands; Norway; Portugal; Slovakia; Great Britain; United States
