= 2010 Tour of Flanders =

2010 UCI ProTour 2010 UCI World Ranking, race 7

Race details
- Dates: 4 April 2010
- Stages: 1
- Distance: 262.3 km (163.0 mi)
- Winning time: 6h 25' 56"

Results
	Winner	Fabian Cancellara (SUI)	(Team Saxo Bank)
	Second	Tom Boonen (BEL)	(Quick-Step)
	Third	Philippe Gilbert (BEL)	(Omega Pharma–Lotto)

The 2010 Tour of Flanders cycle race was the 94th edition of this monument classic and took place on 4 April. The course was 262.3 km long, starting in Bruges and finishing in Ninove. The race was won by Fabian Cancellara ahead of Tom Boonen and Philippe Gilbert.

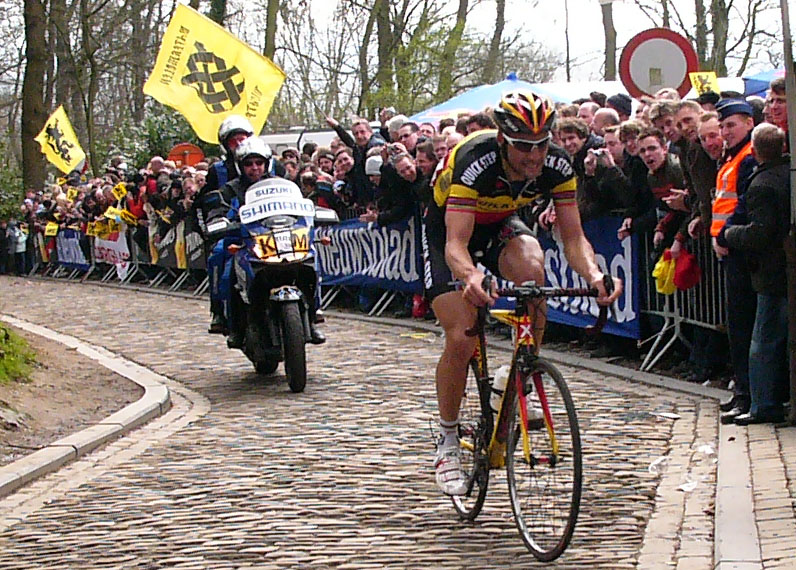
Tom Boonen climbing the Muur van Geraardsbergen

== Course ==
The 16 Tour of Flanders hills were:

Number	Kilometer	Name
1	131	Den Ast
2	165	Kluisberg
3	172	Knokteberg
4	179	Oude Kwaremont
5	183	Paterberg
6	189	Koppenberg
7	195	Steenbeekdries
8	197	Taaienberg
9	202	Eikenberg
10	217	Molenberg
11	224	Leberg
12	229	Berendries
13	236	Tenbosse
14	246	Muur-Kapelmuur
15	250	Bosberg

== Teams ==
There were 25 teams for the 2010 Tour of Flanders. They were:

ProTour Teams

- Ag2r–La Mondiale
- Astana
- Caisse d'Epargne
- Euskaltel–Euskadi
- Footon–Servetto–Fuji
- Française des Jeux
- Garmin–Transitions
- Lampre–Farnese Vini
- Liquigas–Doimo
- Omega Pharma–Lotto
- Quick-Step
- Rabobank
- Team Sky
- Team HTC–Columbia
- Team Katusha
- Team Milram
- Team RadioShack
- Team Saxo Bank

Pro Continental Teams

- Bbox Bouygues Telecom
- BMC Racing Team
- Cervélo TestTeam
- Landbouwkrediet
- Skil–Shimano
- Topsport Vlaanderen–Mercator
- Vacansoleil

== General standings ==
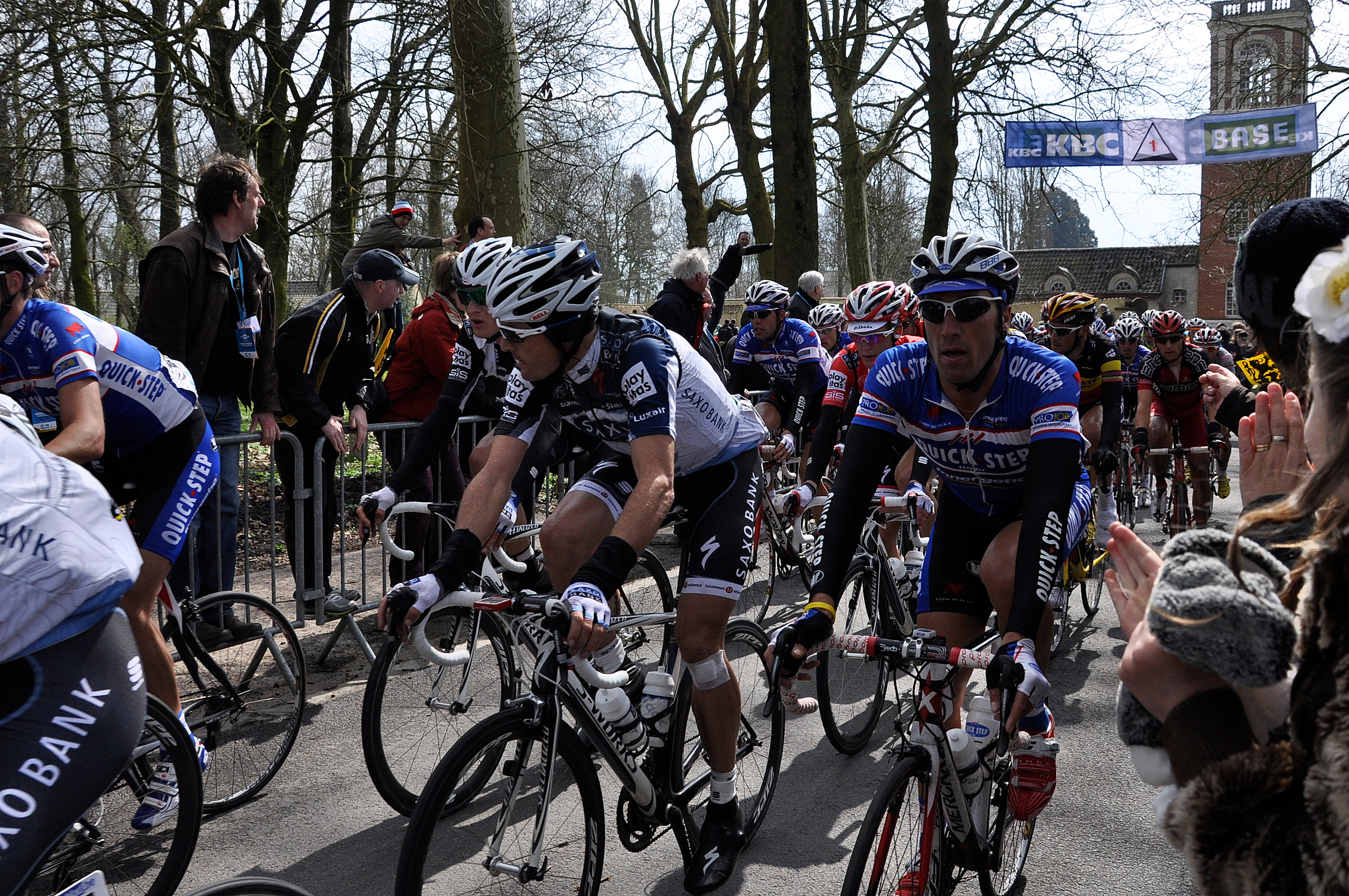
Riders at Den Ast

	Cyclist	Team	Time	UCI World Ranking Points
1	Fabian Cancellara (SUI)	Team Saxo Bank	6h 25' 56"	100
2	Tom Boonen (BEL)	Quick-Step	+ 1' 15"	80
3	Philippe Gilbert (BEL)	Omega Pharma–Lotto	+ 2' 11"	70
4	Björn Leukemans (BEL)	Vacansoleil	+ 2' 15"	60
5	Tyler Farrar (USA)	Garmin–Transitions	+ 2' 35"	50
6	George Hincapie (USA)	BMC Racing Team	s.t.	40
7	Roger Hammond (GBR)	Cervélo TestTeam	s.t.	30
8	Maxim Iglinskiy (KAZ)	Astana	s.t.	20
9	Danilo Hondo (GER)	Lampre–Farnese Vini	s.t.	10
10	William Bonnet (FRA)	Bbox Bouygues Telecom	s.t.	4
Source: CyclingNews.com
