= 2010 Grand Prix Cycliste de Montréal =

2010 UCI World Ranking, race 25 of 26

Race details
- Dates: September 12, 2010
- Stages: 1
- Distance: 193.6 km (120.3 mi)

Results
	Winner	Robert Gesink (NED)	(Rabobank)
	Second	Peter Sagan (SVK)	(Liquigas–Doimo)
	Third	Ryder Hesjedal (CAN)	(Garmin–Transitions)

The 2010 Grand Prix Cycliste de Montréal was the first edition of the Grand Prix Cycliste de Montréal, one-day professional bicycle road race held in Montreal, Quebec, Canada. It was held on September 12, 2010, as the final event in the 2010 UCI ProTour. With the Grand Prix Cycliste de Québec held two days earlier on September 10, 2010, the 2010 edition was the last of only two stops in North America for the 2010 UCI ProTour. It is part of the UCI World Ranking.

== Course ==
The course consists of three climbs each circuit and is well-suited for climbers. The climbs consist of:

- KM 2: Côte Camilien-Houde 1.8 km, 8% average grade
- KM 6: Côte de la Polytechnique 780 m, 6% average grade, including a 200 m climb at 11%
- KM 11: Avenue du Parc 560 m, 4% average grade

Note: The last climb crosses through the finish line

== Teams ==
Twenty One teams were invited to the 2010 Grand Prix Cycliste de Montréal.

Teams from the UCI Pro Tour

- Ag2r–La Mondiale
- Astana
- Caisse d'Epargne
- Euskaltel–Euskadi
- Footon–Servetto–Fuji
- Française des Jeux
- Garmin–Transitions
- Lampre–Farnese
- Liquigas–Doimo
- Omega Pharma–Lotto
- Quick-Step
- Rabobank
- Team Sky
- Team HTC–Columbia
- Team Katusha
- Team Milram
- Team RadioShack
- Team Saxo Bank

Teams awarded a wildcard invitation

- Bbox Bouygues Telecom
- BMC Racing Team
- Cofidis
- Canadian National Team

== Results ==
	Cyclist	Team	Time	UCI World Ranking Points
1	Robert Gesink (NED)	Rabobank	4h 58′22″	80
2	Peter Sagan (SVK)	Liquigas–Doimo	+ 4"	60
3	Ryder Hesjedal (CAN)	Garmin–Transitions	+ 4"	50
4	Haimar Zubeldia (ESP)	Team RadioShack	+ 4"	40
5	Maxime Monfort (BEL)	Team HTC–Columbia	+ 4"	30
6	Samuel Sánchez (ESP)	Euskaltel–Euskadi	+ 9"	20
7	Leonardo Duque (COL)	Cofidis	+ 14"	10
8	Alexander Bocharov (RUS)	Team Katusha	+ 14"	8
9	Francesco Gavazzi (ITA)	Lampre–Farnese Vini	+ 14"	6
10	Alessandro Ballan (ITA)	BMC Racing Team	+ 14"	2
