= 2010–11 UCI Europe Tour =

Road bicycle race series

- Seventh edition of the UCI Europe Tour

Details
- Dates: 28 October 2010 – 16 October 2011
- Location: Europe
- Races: About 300+

Champions
- Individual champion: Giovanni Visconti (ITA) (Farnese Vini–Neri Sottoli)
- Teams' champion: FDJ
- Nations' champion: Italy

The 2010–11 UCI Europe Tour was the seventh season of the UCI Europe Tour. The season began on 28 October 2010 with the Tour of Marmara and ended on 16 October 2011 with the Chrono des Nations.

The points leader, based on the cumulative results of previous races, wears the UCI Europe Tour cycling jersey. Giovanni Visconti of Italy was the defending champion of the 2009–10 UCI Europe Tour and was crowned as the 2010–11 UCI Europe Tour.

Throughout the season, points are awarded to the top finishers of stages within stage races and the final general classification standings of each of the stages races and one-day events. The quality and complexity of a race also determines how many points are awarded to the top finishers, the higher the UCI rating of a race, the more points are awarded.

The UCI ratings from highest to lowest are as follows:

- Multi-day events: 2.HC, 2.1 and 2.2
- One-day events: 1.HC, 1.1 and 1.2

== Events ==
=== 2010 ===
Date	Race name	Location	UCI Rating	Winner	Team
28–31 October	Tour of Marmara	Turkey	2.2	Kemal Küçükbay (TUR)	Brisaspor
4–7 November	Tour of Alanya	Turkey	2.2	Nikias Arndt (GER)	LKT Team Brandenburg

=== 2011 ===
Date	Race name	Location	UCI Rating	Winner	Team
28–30 January	Giro della Provincia di Reggio Calabria	Italy	2.1	Daniele Pietropolli (ITA)	Lampre–ISD
30 January	Grand Prix Cycliste la Marseillaise	France	1.1	Jérémy Roy (FRA)	FDJ
2–6 February	Étoile de Bessèges	France	2.1	Anthony Ravard (FRA)	Ag2r–La Mondiale
5 February	Gran Premio della Costa Etruschi	Italy	1.1	Elia Viviani (ITA)	Liquigas–Cannondale
6 February	Trofeo Mallorca	Spain	1.1	Tyler Farrar (USA)	Garmin–Cervélo
7 February	Trofeo Cala Millor	Spain	1.1	Tyler Farrar (USA)	Garmin–Cervélo
8 February	Trofeo Inca	Spain	1.1	Ben Hermans (BEL)	Team RadioShack
9 February	Trofeo Deia	Spain	1.1	José Joaquín Rojas (ESP)	Movistar Team
9–13 February	Tour Méditerranéen	France	2.1	David Moncoutié (FRA)	Cofidis
10 February	Trofeo Magaluf-Palmanova	Spain	1.1	Murilo Fischer (BRA)	Garmin–Cervélo
16–20 February	Volta ao Algarve	Portugal	2.1	Tony Martin (GER)	HTC–Highroad
19 February	Trofeo Laigueglia	Italy	1.1	Daniele Pietropolli (ITA)	Lampre–ISD
19–20 February	Tour du Haut Var	France	2.1	Thomas Voeckler (FRA)	Team Europcar
20–24 February	Vuelta a Andalucía	Spain	2.1	Markel Irizar (ESP)	Team RadioShack
22–26 February	Giro di Sardegna	Italy	2.1	Peter Sagan (SVK)	Liquigas–Cannondale
26 February	Gran Premio dell'Insubria-Lugano	Switzerland	1.1	Giovanni Visconti (ITA)	Farnese Vini–Neri Sottoli
26 February	Beverbeek Classic	Belgium	1.2	Evert Verbist (BEL)	Veranda's Willems–Accent
26 February	Ster van Zwolle	Netherlands	1.2	Barry Markus (NED)	Rabobank Continental Team
26 February	Omloop Het Nieuwsblad	Belgium	1.HC	Sebastian Langeveld (NED)	Rabobank
27 February	Classica Sarda	Italy	1.1	Pavel Brutt (RUS)	Team Katusha
27 February	Clásica de Almería	Spain	1.1	Matteo Pelucchi (ITA)	Geox–TMC
27 February	Kuurne–Brussels–Kuurne	Belgium	1.1	Chris Sutton (AUS)	Team Sky
27 February	Gran Premio di Lugano	Switzerland	1.1	Ivan Basso (ITA)	Liquigas–Cannondale
27 February	Les Boucles du Sud Ardèche	France	1.1	Arthur Vichot (FRA)	FDJ
2 March	Le Samyn	Belgium	1.1	Dominic Klemme (GER)	Leopard Trek
3 March	Giro del Friuli	Italy	1.1	José Serpa (COL)	Androni Giocattoli
4–6 March	Vuelta a Murcia	Spain	2.1	~~Alberto Contador (ESP)~~; Jérôme Coppel (FRA)	~~Saxo Bank–SunGard~~; Saur–Sojasun
4–6 March	Driedaagse van West-Vlaanderen	Belgium	2.1	Jesse Sergent (NZL)	Team RadioShack
5 March	Strade Bianche	Italy	1.1	Philippe Gilbert (BEL)	Omega Pharma–Lotto
5 March	De Vlaamse Pijl	Belgium	1.2	Frédéric Amorison (BEL)	Landbouwkrediet
6 March	Trofeo Zsšdi	Italy	1.2	Enrico Battaglin (ITA)	Zalf Désirée Fior
6 March	Grand Prix de la Ville de Lillers	France	1.2	Denis Flahaut (FRA)	Roubaix–Lille Métropole
13 March	Paris–Troyes	France	1.2	Jonathan Hivert (FRA)	Saur–Sojasun
13 March	Poreč Trophy	Croatia	1.2	Blaž Jarc (SLO)	Adria Mobil
13 March	Omloop van het Waasland	Belgium	1.2	Aidis Kruopis (LTU)	Landbouwkrediet
13 March	Trofeo Franco Balestra	Italy	1.2	Alessandro Mazzi (ITA)	Petroli Firenze Team
13 March	Rabobank Dorpenomloop Rucphen	Netherlands	1.2	Barry Markus (NED)	Rabobank Continental Team
13 March	Kattekoers	Belgium	1.2	Jonas Vangenechten (BEL)	Wallonie Bruxelles–Crédit Agricole
16 March	Nokere Koerse	Belgium	1.1	Gert Steegmans (BEL)	Quick-Step
17–20 March	Istrian Spring Trophy	Croatia	2.2	Robert Vrečer (SLO)	Perutnina Ptuj
18 March	Handzame Classic	Belgium	1.1	Steve Schets (BEL)	Donckers Koffie–Jelly Belly
19 March	Classic Loire Atlantique	France	1.1	Lieuwe Westra (NED)	Vacansoleil–DCM
20 March	Cholet-Pays de la Loire	France	1.1	Thomas Voeckler (FRA)	Team Europcar
20 March	GP San Giuseppe	Italy	1.2	Enrico Battaglin (ITA)	Zalf Désirée Fior
20 March	La Roue Tourangelle	France	1.2	David Veilleux (CAN)	Team Europcar
21–27 March	Tour de Normandie	France	2.2	Alexandre Blain (FRA)	Endura Racing
22–26 March	Settimana Internazionale di Coppi e Bartali	Italy	2.1	Emanuele Sella (ITA)	Androni Giocattoli
23 March	Dwars door Vlaanderen	Belgium	1.1	Nick Nuyens (BEL)	Saxo Bank–SunGard
25–27 March	Grand Prix du Portugal	Portugal	2.2	Filipe Cardoso (POR)	Barbot–Efapel
26 March	E3 Prijs Vlaanderen – Harelbeke	Belgium	1.HC	Fabian Cancellara (SWI)	Leopard Trek
26–27 March	Critérium International	France	2.HC	Fränk Schleck (LUX)	Leopard Trek
29–31 March	Three Days of De Panne	Belgium	2.HC	Sébastien Rosseler (BEL)	Team RadioShack
1 April	Route Adélie de Vitré	France	1.1	Renaud Dion (FRA)	Bretagne–Schuller
1–3 April	Le Triptyque des Monts et Châteaux	Belgium	2.2	Tom Dumoulin (NED)	Rabobank Continental Team
2 April	Hel van het Mergelland	Netherlands	1.1	Pim Ligthart (NED)	Vacansoleil–DCM
2 April	GP Miguel Induráin	Spain	1.HC	Samuel Sánchez (ESP)	Euskaltel–Euskadi
3 April	Flèche d'Emeraude	France	1.1	Tony Gallopin (FRA)	Cofidis
3 April	GP de la Ville de Nogent-sur-Oise	France	1.2	Alexey Tsatevitch (RUS)	Itera–Katusha
3 April	Trofeo Piva	Italy	1.2U	Richard Lang (AUS)	Team Jayco–AIS
5–8 April	Circuit de la Sarthe	France	2.1	Anthony Roux (FRA)	FDJ
6 April	Scheldeprijs	Belgium	1.HC	Mark Cavendish (GBR)	HTC–Highroad
6–10 April	GP of Sochi	Russia	2.2	Björn Schröder (GER)	Team Nutrixxion–Sparkasse
7 April	Grand Prix Pino Cerami	Belgium	1.1	Bert Scheirlinckx (BEL)	Landbouwkrediet
6–9 April	Cinturón a Mallorca	Spain	2.2	Iker Camaño (ESP)	Endura Racing
8–10 April	Circuit des Ardennes	France	2.2	Gianni Meersman (BEL)	FDJ
9 April	Trofeo Edil C	Italy	1.2	Mattia Pozzo (ITA)	Viris Vigevano
9 April	Ronde van Vlaanderen U23	Belgium	1.Ncup	Salvatore Puccio (ITA)	Italy (national team)
10 April	Giro dell'Appennino	Italy	1.1	Damiano Cunego (ITA)	Lampre–ISD
10 April	Klasika Primavera	Spain	1.1	Jonathan Hivert (FRA)	Saur–Sojasun
12 April	Paris–Camembert	France	1.1	Sandy Casar (FRA)	FDJ
13 April	Brabantse Pijl	Belgium	1.HC	Philippe Gilbert (BEL)	Omega Pharma–Lotto
13 April	La Côte Picarde	France	1.Ncup	Arnaud Démare (FRA)	France (national team)
13–17 April	Vuelta a Castilla y León	Spain	2.1	Xavier Tondó (ESP)	Movistar Team
13–17 April	Tour of Hellas	Greece	2.2	Stefan Schäfer (GER)	LKT Team Brandenburg
13–17 April	Tour du Loir-et-Cher	France	2.2	Anthony Saux (FRA)	Team UC Nantes Atlantique
14 April	Grand Prix de Denain	France	1.1	Jimmy Casper (FRA)	Saur–Sojasun
15–16 April	Ronde van Drenthe	Netherlands	2.1	Kenny van Hummel (NED)	Skil–Shimano
16 April	Tour du Finistère	France	1.1	Romain Feillu (FRA)	Vacansoleil–DCM
16 April	Liège–Bastogne–Liège Espoirs	Belgium	1.2U	Tosh Van der Sande (BEL)	Omega Pharma–Lotto–Davo
16 April	ZLM Tour	Netherlands	1.Ncup	Luke Rowe (GBR)	Great Britain (national team)
17 April	Tro-Bro Léon	France	1.1	Vincent Jérôme (FRA)	Team Europcar
17 April	Zellik–Galmaarden	Belgium	1.2	Gaetan Bille (BEL)	Wallonie Bruxelles–Crédit Agricole
17 April	Grand Prix of Donetsk	Ukraine	1.2	Yuriy Agarkov (UKR)	ISD–Lampre Continental
17 April	Rutland-Melton Classic	United Kingdom	1.2	Zakkari Dempster (AUS)	Rapha Condor–Sharp
19–22 April	Giro del Trentino	Italy	2.HC	Michele Scarponi (ITA)	Lampre–ISD
19–23 April	Toscana-Terra di Ciclismo	Italy	2.Ncup	Georg Preidler (AUT)	Austria (national team)
20–24 April	GP of Adygeya	Russia	2.2	Kirill Sinitsyn (RUS)	Sibir
23 April	Grand Prix Herning	Denmark	1.1	Troels Vinther (DEN)	Glud & Marstrand–LRØ
23 April	Banja Luka-Belgrade I	Bosnia and Herzegovina	1.2	Krisztián Lovassy (HUN)	Ora Hotels–Carrera
23 April	GP Llodio	Spain	1.1	Santiago Pérez (ESP)	Barbot–Efapel
23 April	Arno Wallaard Memorial	Netherlands	1.2	Arne Hassink (NED)	TT Raiko-Argon 18
24 April	Vuelta a La Rioja	Spain	1.1	Imanol Erviti (ESP)	Movistar Team
24 April	Paris–Mantes-en-Yvelines	France	1.2	Pierre Drancourt (FRA)	ESEG Douai
24 April	Banja Luka-Belgrade II	Serbia	1.2	Matija Kvasina (CRO)	Loborika Favorit Team
24 April	Himmerland Rundt	Denmark	1.2	Michael Reihs (DEN)	Christina Watches-Onfone
24 Apr–1 May	Presidential Tour of Turkey	Turkey	2.HC	Alexander Efimkin (RUS)	Team Type 1–Sanofi Aventis
25 April	Rund um Köln	Germany	1.1	Michael Matthews (AUS)	Rabobank
25 April	Ronde van Noord-Holland	Netherlands	1.2	Niels Wytinck (BEL)	Colba–Mercury
25 April	Gran Premio della Liberazione	Italy	1.2U	Matteo Trentin (ITA)	Team Brilla-Pasta Montegrappa
25 April	Giro del Belvedere	Italy	1.2U	Nicola Boem (ITA)	Zalf Désirée Fior
25 April–1 May	Tour de Bretagne	France	2.2	Péter Kusztor (HUN)	Atlas Personal
26 April	GP Palio del Recioto	Italy	1.2U	Georg Preidler (AUT)	Tyrol Team
27 April–2 May	Vuelta a Asturias	Spain	2.1	Javier Moreno (ESP)	Caja Rural
30 April	GP Industria & Artigianato di Larciano	Italy	1.1	Ángel Vicioso (ESP)	Androni Giocattoli
30 April	Mayor Cup	Russia	1.2	Ivan Stević (SRB)	Partizan Powermove
1 May	Rund um den Finanzplatz Eschborn–Frankfurt	Germany	1.HC	John Degenkolb (GER)	HTC–Highroad
1 May	Rund um den Finanzplatz Eschborn–Frankfurt U23	Germany	1.2U	Patrick Bercz (GER)	Team NRW
1 May	Memoriał Andrzeja Trochanowskiego	Poland	1.2	André Schulze (GER)	CCC–Polsat–Polkowice
1 May	Grote 1-MeiPrijs	Belgium	1.2	Aidis Kruopis (LTU)	Landbouwkrediet
1 May	Circuito del Porto	Italy	1.2	Cristian Rossi (ITA)	Casati Named
1 May	Memorial Oleg Dyachenko	Russia	1.2	Dmitry Kosyakov (RUS)	Itera–Katusha
2 May	GP of Moscow	Russia	1.2	Oleksandr Martynenko (UKR)	ISD–Lampre Continental
4–8 May	Giro del Friuli-Venezia Giulia	Italy	2.2	Matteo Busato (ITA)	Zalf Désirée Fior
4–8 May	Four Days of Dunkirk	France	2.HC	Thomas Voeckler (FRA)	Team Europcar
5–9 May	Five Rings of Moscow	Russia	2.2	Sergey Firsanov (RUS)	Itera–Katusha
6–8 May	Szlakiem Grodów Piastowskich	Poland	2.1	Robert Vrečer (SLO)	Perutnina Ptuj
7 May	Ronde van Overijssel	Netherlands	1.2	Wouter Haan (NED)	Ruiter Dakkapellen Wielerteam
7–8 May	Vuelta a la Comunidad de Madrid	Spain	2.1	Rui Costa (POR)	Movistar Team
8 May	Circuit de Wallonie	Belgium	1.2	Diego Tamayo (COL)	WIT
8 May	GP Industrie del Marmo	Italy	1.2	Rafael Andriato (BRA)	U.C. Trevigiani–Dynamon–Bottoli
8 May	Omloop der Kempen	Netherlands	1.2	Jos Pronk (NED)	Ruiter Dakkapellen Wielerteam
12–15 May	Rhône-Alpes Isère Tour	France	2.2	Sylvain Georges (FRA)	BigMat–Auber 93
13–15 May	Tour de Picardie	France	2.1	Romain Feillu (FRA)	Vacansoleil–DCM
14 May	Scandinavian Race	Sweden	1.2	Andzs Flaksis (LAT)	Rietumu Bank–Delfin
16–21 May	Olympia's Tour	Netherlands	2.2	Jetse Bol (NED)	Rabobank Continental Team
18–22 May	Circuit de Lorraine	France	2.1	Anthony Roux (FRA)	FDJ
19–22 May	Ronde de l'Isard	France	2.2U	Kenny Elissonde (FRA)	CC Etupes
20 May	Jūrmala GP	Latvia	1.2	Jaan Kirsipuu (EST)	Champion System
22 May	ProRace Berlin	Germany	1.1	Marcel Kittel (GER)	Skil–Shimano
22–29 May	An Post Ras	Ireland	2.2	Gediminas Bagdonas (LTU)	An Post–Sean Kelly
25–29 May	Tour of Belgium	Belgium	2.HC	Philippe Gilbert (BEL)	Omega Pharma–Lotto
25–29 May	Bayern Rundfahrt	Germany	2.HC	Geraint Thomas (GBR)	Team Sky
26–29 May	Tour of Trakya	Turkey	2.2	Andreas Keuser (GER)	Team Worldofbike.gr
27 May	Tallinn–Tartu GP	Estonia	1.1	Angelo Furlan (ITA)	Christina Watches–Onfone
27–29 May	Tour de Gironde	France	2.2	Julien Foisnet (FRA)	Véranda Rideau
28 May	Tartu GP	Estonia	1.1	Jean Eudes Demaret (FRA)	Cofidis
28 May	Grand Prix de Plumelec-Morbihan	France	1.1	Sylvain Georges (FRA)	BigMat–Auber 93
29 May	Rogaland GP	Norway	2.2	Frederik Wilmann (NOR)	Joker–Merida
29 May	Boucles de l'Aulne	France	1.1	Martijn Keizer (NED)	Vacansoleil–DCM
29 May	Trofeo Città di San Vendemiano	Italy	1.2U	Michele Gazzara (ITA)	U.C. Trevigiani–Dynamon–Bottoli
29 May	Paris–Roubaix Espoirs	France	1.2U	Ramon Sinkeldam (NED)	Rabobank Continental Team
1–5 June	Tour of Norway	Norway	2.2	Wilco Kelderman (NED)	Rabobank Continental Team
1–5 June	Tour de Luxembourg	Luxembourg	2.HC	Linus Gerdemann (GER)	Leopard Trek
2 June	Trofeo Alcide Degasperi	Italy	1.2	Matteo Trentin (ITA)	Team Brilla Pasta Montegrappa
2–5 June	Tour de Berlin	Germany	2.2U	Jasha Sütterlin (GER)	Thüringer Energie Team
2–5 June	Tour of Isparta	Turkey	2.2	Mustafa Sayar (TUR)	Konya–Torku Sekerspor–Vivelo
4–11 June	Tour de Slovaquie	Slovakia	2.2	Nikita Novikov (RUS)	Itera–Katusha
4–11 June	Tour of Romania	Romania	2.2	Andrei Nechita (ROM)	Romania (national team)
5 June	Tour de Rijke	Netherlands	1.1	Theo Bos (NED)	Rabobank
5 June	Grand Prix of Aargau Canton	Switzerland	1.1	Michael Albasini (SUI)	Switzerland (national team)
5 June	Memorial Van Coningsloo	Belgium	1.2	Andrew Fenn (GBR)	An Post–Sean Kelly
5 June	Coppa della Pace	Italy	1.2	Andrey Solomennikov (RUS)	Itera–Katusha
8–12 June	Carpathia Couriers Path	Poland	2.2U	Paweł Bernas (POL)	Kelly's GKS Cartusia Kartuzy
9–12 June	Ronde de l'Oise	France	2.2	Gediminas Bagdonas (LTU)	An Post–Sean Kelly
9–12 June	Volta ao Alentejo	Portugal	2.2	Evaldas Šiškevičius (LTU)	La Pomme Marseille
9–13 June	Flèche du Sud	Luxembourg	2.2	Lasse Bøchman (DEN)	Glud & Marstrand–LRØ
10–12 June	Delta Tour Zeeland	Netherlands	2.1	Marcel Kittel (GER)	Skil–Shimano
10–19 June	Giro Bio	Italy	2.2	Mattia Cattaneo (ITA)	U.C. Trevigiani–Dynamon–Bottoli
12 June	Neuseenclassics	Germany	1.1	André Schulze (GER)	CCC–Polsat–Polkowice
12 June	Val d'Ille U Classic 35	France	1.2	Guillaume Louyest (FRA)	Saur–Sojasun Espoirs
12 June	GP Judendorf-Strassengel	Austria	1.2	Tomislav Dančulović (CRO)	Loborika Favorit Team
13–19 June	Tour de Serbie	Serbia	2.2	Ivan Stević (SRB)	Partizan Powermove
13–19 June	Thüringen Rundfahrt U23	Germany	2.2U	Wilco Kelderman (NED)	Rabobank Continental Team
15–19 June	Ster Elektrotoer	Netherlands	2.1	Philippe Gilbert (BEL)	Omega Pharma–Lotto
16–18 June	Tour of Małopolska	Poland	2.2	Tomasz Marczyński (POL)	CCC–Polsat–Polkowice
16–19 June	Tour of Slovenia	Slovenia	2.1	Diego Ulissi (ITA)	Lampre–ISD
16–19 June	Route du Sud	France	2.1	Vasil Kiryienka (BLR)	Movistar Team
16–19 June	Boucles de la Mayenne	France	2.2	Jimmy Casper (FRA)	Saur–Sojasun
16–19 June	Tour des Pays de Savoie	France	2.2	Nikita Novikov (RUS)	Itera–Katusha
17–19 June	Oberösterreichrundfahrt	Austria	2.2	Petr Benčik (CZE)	PSK Whirlpool
19 June	Giro di Toscana	Italy	1.1	Dan Martin (IRL)	Garmin–Cervélo
19 June	Flèche Ardennaise	Belgium	1.2	Zico Waeytens (BEL)	Omega Pharma–Lotto–Davo
22 June	Halle–Ingooigem	Belgium	1.1	Roy Curvers (NED)	Skil–Shimano
29 June	I.W.T. Jong Maar Moedig	Belgium	1.2	Bert Scheirlinckx (BEL)	Landbouwkrediet
29 June–3 July	Course de la Solidarité Olympique	Poland	2.1	Marcin Sapa (POL)	Polska Szosowa
30 June–3 July	Tour of Cappadocia	Turkey	2.2	Mert Mutlu (TUR)	Brisaspor
2 July	GP Kranj	Slovenia	1.1	Simone Ponzi (ITA)	Liquigas–Cannondale
2 July	Omloop Het Nieuwsblad U23	Belgium	1.2	Tom Van Asbroeck (BEL)	Van Der Vurst Cycling Team
3 July	Dwars door het Hageland	Belgium	1.2	Grégory Habeaux (BEL)	Veranda's Willems–Accent
3–10 July	Österreich Rundfahrt	Austria	2.HC	Fredrik Kessiakoff (SWE)	Astana
6–10 July	Sibiu Cycling Tour	Romania	2.2	Vladimir Koev (BUL)	Konya–Torku Sekerspor–Vivelo
7–10 July	GP Torres Vedras	Portugal	2.2	Ricardo Mestre (POR)	Tavira–Prio
7–10 July	Vuelta a la Comunidad de Madrid U23	Spain	2.2U	Bob Rodriguez (FRA)	Amical Vélo Club Aixois
7–10 July	Czech Cycling Tour	Czech Republic	2.2	Stanislav Kozubek (CZE)	PSK Whirlpool
10 July	Giro del Medio Brenta	Italy	1.2	Moreno Moser (ITA)	Italy (U23 national team)
10 July	La Ronde Pévèloise	France	1.2	Arnaud Démare (FRA)	CC Nogent-sur-Oise
11 July	GP Stad Geel	Belgium	1.2	Sam Bennett (IRL)	An Post–Sean Kelly
15 July	Gran Premio Nobili Rubinetterie – Coppa Città di Stresa	Italy	1.1	Elia Viviani (ITA)	Liquigas–Cannondale
15 July	European Road Championships (U23) – Time Trial	Italy	CC	Yoann Paillot (FRA)	France (national team)
16 July	Gran Premio Nobili Rubinetterie – Coppa Papà Carlo	Italy	1.1	Simone Ponzi (ITA)	Liquigas–Cannondale
17 July	European Road Championships (U23) – Road Race	Italy	CC	Julian Kern (GER)	Germany (national team)
20–24 July	Brixia Tour	Italy	2.1	Fortunato Baliani (ITA)	D'Angelo & Antenucci–Nippo
23 July	Miskolc GP	Hungary	1.2	Matija Kvasina (CRO)	Loborika Favorit Team
23–25 July	Kreiz Breizh Elites	France	2.2	Laurent Pichon (FRA)	Bretagne–Schuller
23–27 July	Tour de Wallonie	Belgium	2.HC	Greg Van Avermaet (BEL)	BMC Racing Team
24 July	GP de Pérenchies	France	1.2	Anthony Colin (FRA)	Roubaix–Lille Métropole
24 July	Budapest GP	Hungary	1.2	Andris Smirnovs (LAT)	Latvia (national team)
25 July	Prueba Villafranca de Ordizia	Spain	1.1	Julien Simon (FRA)	Saur–Sojasun
26–30 July	Dookoła Mazowsza	Poland	2.2	Robert Radosz (POL)	BDC Team
27–31 July	Tour Alsace	France	2.2	Thibaut Pinot (FRA)	FDJ
31 July	Trofeo Matteotti	Italy	1.1	Oscar Gatto (ITA)	Farnese Vini–Neri Sottoli
31 July	Circuito de Getxo	Spain	1.1	Juan José Lobato (ESP)	Andalucía–Caja Granada
31 July	La Poly Normande	France	1.1	Anthony Delaplace (FRA)	Saur–Sojasun
31 July	Sparkassen Giro	Germany	1.1	Pieter Vanspeybrouck (BEL)	Topsport Vlaanderen–Mercator
2–6 August	Vuelta a León	Spain	2.2	Marc Goos (NED)	Rabobank Continental Team
3–4 August	Paris–Corrèze	France	2.1	Samuel Dumoulin (FRA)	Cofidis
3–7 August	Danmark Rundt	Denmark	2.HC	Simon Gerrans (AUS)	Team Sky
3–7 August	Vuelta a Burgos	Spain	2.HC	Joaquim Rodríguez (ESP)	Team Katusha
4–15 August	Volta a Portugal	Portugal	2.1	Ricardo Mestre (POR)	Tavira–Prio
5 August	GP Folignano	Italy	1.2	Kristijan Đurasek (CRO)	Loborika Favorit Team
6 August	Gran Premio Città di Camaiore	Italy	1.1	Fabio Taborre (ITA)	Acqua & Sapone
6 August	GP Betonexpressz 2000	Hungary	1.2	Martin Schöffmann (AUT)	WSA–Viperbike Kärnten
7 August	Trofeo Bastianelli	Italy	1.2	Kristijan Đurasek (CRO)	Loborika Favorit Team
7 August	Antwerpse Havenpijl	Belgium	1.2	Pirmin Lang (SUI)	Atlas Personal
9–13 August	Tour de l'Ain	France	2.1	David Moncoutié (FRA)	Cofidis
11–13 August	Tour of Szeklerland	Romania	2.2	Florian Bissinger (GER)	Arbö–Gebrüder Weiss–Oberndorfer
11–14 August	Mi-Août Bretonne	France	2.2	Mark McNally (GBR)	An Post–Sean Kelly
13 August	Memoriał Henryka Łasaka	Poland	1.2	Luka Mezgec (SLO)	Sava
14 August	London-Surrey cycle classic	United Kingdom	1.2	Mark Cavendish (GBR)	Great Britain (national team)
14 August	Dwars door de Antwerpse Kempen	Belgium	1.2	Tom Devriendt (BEL)	EFC–Quick Step Cycling Team
14 August	Puchar Uzdrowisk Karpackich	Poland	1.2	Jacek Morajko (POL)	CCC–Polsat–Polkowice
14 August	GP di Poggiana	Italy	1.2U	Mattia Cattaneo (ITA)	U.C. Trevigiani–Dynamon–Bottoli
16 August	GP Capodarco	Italy	1.2	Mattia Cattaneo (ITA)	U.C. Trevigiani–Dynamon–Bottoli
16 August	Tre Valli Varesine	Italy	1.HC	Davide Rebellin (ITA)	Miche–Guerciotti
16–19 August	Tour du Limousin	France	2.HC	Björn Leukemans (BEL)	Vacansoleil–DCM
17 August	Coppa Ugo Agostoni	Italy	1.1	Sacha Modolo (ITA)	Colnago–CSF Inox
18 August	Coppa Bernocchi	Italy	1.1	Yauheni Hutarovich (BLR)	FDJ
19 August	Dutch Food Valley Classic	Netherlands	1.1	Theo Bos (NED)	Rabobank
20 August	Trofeo Melinda	Italy	1.1	Davide Rebellin (ITA)	Miche–Guerciotti
20 August	Puchar Ministra Obrony Narodowej	Poland	1.2	Tomasz Kiendyś (POL)	CCC–Polsat–Polkowice
21 August	Châteauroux Classic	France	1.1	Anthony Ravard (FRA)	Ag2r–La Mondiale
23 August	Grote Prijs Stad Zottegem	Belgium	1.1	Svein Tuft (CAN)	SpiderTech–C10
23 August	GP des Marbriers	France	1.2	Pierre Drancourt (FRA)	ESEG Douai
23–26 August	Tour du Poitou Charentes et de la Vienne	France	2.1	Jesse Sergent (NZL)	Team RadioShack
23–28 August	Giro della Valle d'Aosta	Italy	2.2	Fabio Aru (ITA)	U.C. Palazzago
24 August	Druivenkoers Overijse	Belgium	1.1	Björn Leukemans (BEL)	Vacansoleil–DCM
25 August	Gran Premio Industria e Commercio Artigianato Carnaghese	Italy	1.1	Giovanni Visconti (ITA)	Farnese Vini–Neri Sottoli
25–28 August	Tour of Victory	Turkey	2.2	Nazim Bakırcı (TUR)	Brisaspor
28 August	Schaal Sels	Belgium	1.1	Aidis Kruopis (LTU)	Landbouwkrediet
28 August	Ronde van Midden-Nederland	Netherlands	1.2	Wim Stroetinga (NED)	Ubbink–Koga Cycling Team
28 August	Ljubljana-Zagreb	Slovenia	1.2	Kristjan Fajt (SLO)	Adria Mobil
31 August–3 September	Settimana Ciclistica Lombarda	Italy	2.1	Thibaut Pinot (FRA)	FDJ
2 September	Tour of Vojvodina I	Serbia	1.2	Gregor Gazvoda (SLO)	Perutnina Ptuj
3 September	Tour of Vojvodina II	Serbia	1.2	Zsolt Dér (SRB)	Serbia (national team)
4 September	Giro della Romagna	Italy	1.1	Oscar Gatto (ITA)	Farnese Vini–Neri Sottoli
4 September	Tour du Doubs	France	1.1	Arthur Vichot (FRA)	FDJ
4 September	Grote Prijs Jef Scherens	Belgium	1.1	Jérôme Pineau (FRA)	Quick-Step
4 September	Memorial Davide Fardelli	Italy	1.2	Anton Vorobyev (RUS)	Itera–Katusha
4 September	Kernen Omloop Echt-Susteren	Netherlands	1.2	Andris Smirnovs (LAT)	Latvia (national team)
4–11 September	Tour de l'Avenir	France	2.Ncup	Esteban Chaves (COL)	Colombia (national team)
6–10 September	Giro di Padania	Italy	2.1	Ivan Basso (ITA)	Liquigas–Cannondale
7 September	Memorial Rik Van Steenbergen	Belgium	1.1	Kenny van Hummel (NED)	Skil–Shimano
8–11 September	Tour of Marmara	Turkey	2.2	Ali Riza Tanriverdi (TUR)	Brisaspor
10 September	Paris–Brussels	Belgium	1.HC	Denis Galimzyanov (RUS)	Team Katusha
11 September	Chrono Champenois	France	1.2	Luke Durbridge (AUS)	Australia (national team)
11 September	Grand Prix de Fourmies	France	1.HC	Guillaume Blot (FRA)	Bretagne–Schuller
11–18 September	Tour of Britain	United Kingdom	2.1	Lars Boom (NED)	Rabobank
11–18 September	Tour of Bulgaria	Bulgaria	2.2	Ivaïlo Gabrovski (BUL)	CC Nessebar
14 September	Grand Prix de Wallonie	Belgium	1.1	Philippe Gilbert (BEL)	Omega Pharma–Lotto
16 September	GP de la Somme	France	1.1	Anthony Roux (FRA)	FDJ
16 September	Kampioenschap van Vlaanderen	Belgium	1.1	Marcel Kittel (GER)	Skil–Shimano
18 September	Grand Prix d'Isbergues	France	1.1	Jonas Jørgensen (DEN)	Saxo Bank–SunGard
18 September	Gran Premio Industria e Commercio di Prato	Italy	1.1	Peter Sagan (SVK)	Liquigas–Cannondale
18 September	Trofeo Gianfranco Bianchin	Italy	1.2	Moreno Moser (ITA)	Lucchini Maniva
18 September	Duo Normand	France	1.2	Thomas Dekker (NED); Johan Vansummeren (BEL)	Garmin–Cervélo
18 September	GP Impanis-Van Petegem	Belgium	1.2	Sander Cordeel (BEL)	Colba–Mercury Cycling Team
21 September	Omloop van het Houtland Lichtervelde	Belgium	1.1	Guillaume Van Keirsbulck (BEL)	Quick-Step
24–25 September	Tour du Gévaudan Languedoc-Roussillon	France	2.2	Guillaume Levarlet (FRA)	Saur–Sojasun
27 September	Ruota d'Oro	Italy	1.2	Antonio Parrinello (ITA)	Hopplà Truck Valdarno
29 September–2 October	Circuit Franco-Belge	Belgium	2.1	Robbie McEwen (AUS)	Team RadioShack
29 September–2 October	Tour of Gallipoli	Turkey	2.2	Recep Ünalan (TUR)	Manisaspor Cycling Team
30 September–2 October	Cinturó de l'Empordà	Spain	2.2	Paul Voss (GER)	Endura Racing
1 October	Memorial Marco Pantani	Italy	1.1	Fabio Taborre (ITA)	Acqua & Sapone
1 October	Piccolo Giro di Lombardia	Italy	1.2	Cristiano Monguzzi (ITA)	Casati-Named
2 October	Tour de Vendée	France	1.HC	Marco Marcato (ITA)	Vacansoleil–DCM
3 October	Münsterland Giro	Germany	1.1	Marcel Kittel (GER)	Skil–Shimano
4 October	Binche–Tournai–Binche	Belgium	1.1	Rüdiger Selig (GER)	Leopard Trek
6 October	Paris–Bourges	France	1.1	Mathew Hayman (AUS)	Team Sky
6 October	Coppa Sabatini	Italy	1.1	Enrico Battaglin (ITA)	Colnago–CSF Inox
6–9 October	Tour of Alanya	Turkey	2.2	Gabor Kasa (SRB)	Manisaspor Cycling Team
8 October	Giro dell'Emilia	Italy	1.HC	Carlos Betancur (COL)	Acqua & Sapone
9 October	Gran Premio Bruno Beghelli	Italy	1.1	Filippo Pozzato (ITA)	Team Katusha
9 October	Paris–Tours Espoirs	France	1.2U	Fabien Schmidt (FRA)	Team UC Nantes Atlantique
9 October	Paris–Tours	France	1.HC	Greg Van Avermaet (BEL)	BMC Racing Team
11 October	Nationale Sluitingsprijs	Belgium	1.1	Yauheni Hutarovich (BLR)	FDJ
13 October	Giro del Piemonte	Italy	1.HC	Daniel Moreno (ESP)	Team Katusha
16 October	Chrono des Nations	France	1.1	Tony Martin (GER)	HTC–Highroad

== Final ranking ==
There is a competition for the rider, team and country with the most points gained from winning or achieving a high place in the above races.

=== Individual classification ===
Rank	Name	Points
1	Giovanni Visconti (ITA)	716
2	Yauheni Hutarovich (BLR)	659.25
3	Davide Rebellin (ITA)	652
4	Marcel Kittel (DEU)	556
5	Thomas Voeckler (FRA)	518
6	Stefan van Dijk (NED)	494
7	Anthony Roux (FRA)	442
8	Kenny van Hummel (NED)	399
9	Sacha Modolo (ITA)	372
10	Aidis Kruopis (LTU)	349

=== Team classification ===
Rank	Team	Points
1	FDJ	2551.1
2	Skil–Shimano	1619
3	Colnago–CSF Inox	1479
4	Saur–Sojasun	1411.75
5	Cofidis	1386
6	Farnese Vini–Neri Sottoli	1355
7	Landbouwkrediet	1240
8	Team Europcar	1155
9	Androni Giocattoli	1150
10	Itera–Katusha	1040

=== Nation classification ===
Rank	Nation	Points
1	Italy	4174.2
2	France	3181.2
3	Netherlands	2184.34
4	Germany	2162
5	Belgium	1688.2
6	Slovenia	1640.4
7	Russia	1556.57
8	Spain	1143.2
9	Portugal	1096
10	Poland	1049

=== Nation under-23 classification ===
Rank	Nation under-23	Points
1	Italy	1666.5
2	France	1541.65
3	Netherlands	1167.68
4	Russia	710
5	Germany	678.75
6	Belgium	643
7	Great Britain	454
8	Turkey	442
9	Latvia	295
10	Spain	234.5
