= 2011 Tour of Belgium =

2010–11 UCI Europe Tour

Race details
- Dates: 25—29 May
- Stages: 4+Prologue
- Distance: 727.3 km (451.9 mi)

Results
Jersey awarded to the overall winner	Winner	Philippe Gilbert (BEL)	(Omega Pharma–Lotto)
	Second	Greg Van Avermaet (BEL)	(BMC Racing Team)
	Third	Björn Leukemans (BEL)	(Vacansoleil–DCM)
Jersey awarded to the points classification winner	Points	André Greipel (GER)	(Omega Pharma–Lotto)
Jersey awarded to the youth classification winner	Youth	Pim Ligthart (NED)	(Vacansoleil–DCM)
Jersey awarded to the sprints classification winner	Sprints	Marcus Burghardt (GER)	(BMC Racing Team)
	Team	Vacansoleil–DCM	

The 2011 Tour of Belgium is the 81st edition of the Tour of Belgium cycling stage race. It takes place from 25 May to 29 May 2011 in Belgium. The race is part of the UCI Europe Tour. It begins with a short prologue in Buggenhout, followed by four longer stages, ultimately finishing in Putte.

== Schedule ==
Stage	Route	Distance	Date	Winner
P	Buggenhout (Belgium) > Buggenhout (Belgium)	5.6 km	Wednesday, May 25	(Netherlands) Lieuwe Westra
1	Lochristi (Belgium) > Knokke-Heist (Belgium)	162.5 km	Thursday, May 26	(Germany) André Greipel
2	Knokke-Heist (Belgium) > Ypres (Belgium)	187.8 km	Friday, May 27	(Lithuania) Aidis Kruopis
3	Bertem (Belgium) > Eupen (Belgium)	202 km	Saturday, May 28	(Belgium) Philippe Gilbert
4	Oreye (Belgium) > Putte (Belgium)	169.4 km	Sunday, May 29	(Germany) André Greipel

== Teams ==
Twenty-one teams have been invited to the 2011 Tour of Belgium: 7 teams are from the UCI ProTeams, 7 are UCI Professional Continental Teams and 7 are UCI Continental Teams.

UCI ProTeams
- (Kazakhstan) Astana
- (United States) BMC Racing Team
- (Belgium) Omega Pharma–Lotto
- (Belgium) Quick-Step
- (Netherlands) Rabobank
- (Russia) Team Katusha
- (Netherlands) Vacansoleil–DCM
UCI Professional Continental Teams
- (Italy) Acqua & Sapone
- (France) Cofidis
- (Belgium) Landbouwkrediet
- (France) Saur–Sojasun
- (Netherlands) Skil–Shimano
- (Belgium) Topsport Vlaanderen–Mercator
- (Belgium) Veranda's Willems–Accent
UCI Continental Teams
- (Belgium) An Post–Sean Kelly
- (Belgium) BKCP–Powerplus
- (Belgium) Donckers Koffie–Jelly Belly
- (Belgium) Jong Vlaanderen–Bauknecht
- (Belgium) Sunweb–Revor
- (Belgium) Telenet–Fidea
- (Belgium) Wallonie Bruxelles–Crédit Agricole

== Stages ==
=== Prologue ===
25 May 2011 – Buggenhout (Belgium), 5.6 km (3.5 mi)

With only 7 turns in the course, the short prologue in Buggenhout was not technical and favored more powerful riders. One of these riders is André Greipel, who set the first strong mark at 6' 45" as one of the first riders. Surprisingly, the first rider to beat his time was his young teammate Jens Debusschere, who stayed in the lead for quite a long time. Eventually Sebastian Langeveld beat the time of Debusschere and from that point on, with the winds turning, a few more riders managed to come close to the time of Langeveld. Eventually Langevelds compatriot Lieuwe Westra beat his time by a mere four seconds to take the stage win and the first black jersey. The Belgian spectators were delighted to see Tom Boonen and Philippe Gilbert riding good times, both finishing in the top 10 after a period of absence following the spring classics.

Prologue Result and General Classification after Prologue

	Rider	Team	Time
1	Lieuwe Westra (NED)	Vacansoleil–DCM	6' 37"
2	Philippe Gilbert (BEL)	Omega Pharma–Lotto	+ 1"
3	Dominique Cornu (BEL)	Topsport Vlaanderen–Mercator	+ 2"
4	Sebastian Langeveld (NED)	Rabobank	+ 4"
5	Maarten Wynants (BEL)	Rabobank	+ 7"
6	Jens Debusschere (BEL)	Omega Pharma–Lotto	+ 7"
7	Cyril Lemoine (FRA)	Saur–Sojasun	+ 8"
8	Tom Boonen (BEL)	Quick-Step	+ 8"
9	André Greipel (GER)	Omega Pharma–Lotto	+ 9"
10	Jens Keukeleire (BEL)	Cofidis	+ 9"

=== Stage 1 ===
26 May 2011 – Lochristi (Belgium) to Knokke-Heist (Belgium), 162.5 km (101.0 mi)

The stage started with one minute of silence in remembrance of Belgian cyclist Wouter Weylandt, a former stage winner during the Tour of Belgium who died two weeks earlier as a result of a crash during the 2011 Giro d'Italia.

With around 60 kilometres to go and strong winds picking up as the peloton got closer to the North Sea, the Quick-Step team pulled the peloton apart by using the drafting technique, as such creating an elite group. Notable absentees in this group were leader in the race Lieuwe Westra, two time Tour of Belgium winner Stijn Devolder and classics specialist Filippo Pozzato who would finish several minutes back in one of the dropped groups. The elite group sprinted for the victory in Knokke-Heist, with André Greipel taking the stage win and due to the bonification seconds he also became the new leader.

Stage 1 result

	Rider	Team	Time
1	André Greipel (GER)	Omega Pharma–Lotto	3h 38' 14"
2	Kenny van Hummel (NED)	Skil–Shimano	s.t.
3	Maxime Vantomme (BEL)	Team Katusha	s.t.
4	Tom Boonen (BEL)	Quick-Step	s.t.
5	Nikolay Trusov (RUS)	Team Katusha	s.t.
6	Pim Ligthart (NED)	Vacansoleil–DCM	s.t.
7	Allan Davis (AUS)	Astana	s.t.
8	Maarten Wynants (BEL)	Rabobank	s.t.
9	Michael Van Staeyen (BEL)	Topsport Vlaanderen–Mercator	s.t.
10	Aidis Kruopis (LTU)	Landbouwkrediet	s.t.

General Classification after Stage 1

	Rider	Team	Time
1	André Greipel (GER)	Omega Pharma–Lotto	3h 44' 49"
2	Philippe Gilbert (BEL)	Omega Pharma–Lotto	+ 2"
3	Dominique Cornu (BEL)	Topsport Vlaanderen–Mercator	+ 3"
4	Maarten Wynants (BEL)	Rabobank	+ 8"
5	Tom Boonen (BEL)	Quick-Step	s.t.
6	Jens Keukeleire (BEL)	Cofidis	+ 10"
7	Sebastian Langeveld (NED)	Rabobank	s.t.
8	Pim Ligthart (NED)	Vacansoleil–DCM	+ 13"
9	John Murphy (USA)	BMC Racing Team	s.t.
10	Jens Debusschere (BEL)	Omega Pharma–Lotto	+ 14"

=== Stage 2 ===
27 May 2011 – Knokke-Heist (Belgium) to Ypres (Belgium), 187.8 km (116.7 mi)

Just a few kilometres into the stage, five riders broke away from the peloton: Koen Barbé, Marcus Burghardt, Niko Eeckhout, Jens Mouris and Luca Paolini. The breakaway group got a lead of up to four minutes, but was caught just after the second climb of the Kemmelberg by Philippe Gilbert. Soon after, about 20 other riders also closed the gap, while Gilbert had managed to win the last intermediate sprint of the day, which gave him enough time bonus to overtake his teammate André Greipel in the standings. The lead group increased to almost 60 riders and with the finish line coming closer it was hard for anyone to get away from the pack. A late solo breakaway by Jelle Wallays was ended just 2 kilometres from the finish and the group sprinted for the stage win. In the sprint, Tom Boonen and Allan Davis came up strongly to the front but faded early, allowing Aidis Kruopis to overtake them in the final metres and book the biggest win of his young career. André Greipel lost both the black jersey for the overall lead and the yellow jersey of the points classification, respectively to Philippe Gilbert and Tom Boonen.

Stage 2 result

	Rider	Team	Time
1	Aidis Kruopis (LTU)	Landbouwkrediet	4h 21' 41"
2	Stefan van Dijk (NED)	Veranda's Willems–Accent	s.t.
3	Pim Ligthart (NED)	Vacansoleil–DCM	s.t.
4	Allan Davis (AUS)	Astana	s.t.
5	Pieter Ghyllebert (BEL)	An Post–Sean Kelly	s.t.
6	Maxime Vantomme (BEL)	Team Katusha	s.t.
7	Tom Boonen (BEL)	Quick-Step	s.t.
8	Tom Meeusen (BEL)	Telenet–Fidea	s.t.
9	Rafaâ Chtioui (TUN)	Acqua & Sapone	s.t.
10	Maarten Wynants (BEL)	Rabobank	s.t.

General Classification after Stage 2

	Rider	Team	Time
1	Philippe Gilbert (BEL)	Omega Pharma–Lotto	8h 06' 29"
2	André Greipel (GER)	Omega Pharma–Lotto	+ 1"
3	Dominique Cornu (BEL)	Topsport Vlaanderen–Mercator	+ 4"
4	Maarten Wynants (BEL)	Rabobank	+ 9"
5	Pim Ligthart (NED)	Vacansoleil–DCM	+ 10"
6	Tom Boonen (BEL)	Quick-Step	+ 11"
7	Jens Keukeleire (BEL)	Cofidis	+ 11"
8	Sebastian Langeveld (NED)	Rabobank	+ 14"
9	Greg Van Avermaet (BEL)	BMC Racing Team	+ 16"
10	Cyril Lemoine (FRA)	Saur–Sojasun	+ 17"

=== Stage 3 ===
28 May 2011 – Bertem (Belgium) to Eupen (Belgium), 202 km (126 mi)

Stage 3 result

	Rider	Team	Time
1	Philippe Gilbert (BEL)	Omega Pharma–Lotto	4h 50' 47"
2	Greg Van Avermaet (BEL)	BMC Racing Team	s.t.
3	Björn Leukemans (BEL)	Vacansoleil–DCM	s.t.
4	Bert De Waele (BEL)	Landbouwkrediet	+ 7"
5	Egor Silin (RUS)	Team Katusha	+ 21"
6	Joost van Leijen (NED)	Vacansoleil–DCM	+ 46"
7	Niki Terpstra (NED)	Quick-Step	+ 48"
8	Sébastien Joly (FRA)	Saur–Sojasun	+ 50"
9	Enrico Gasparotto (ITA)	Astana	+ 53"
10	Pim Ligthart (NED)	Vacansoleil–DCM	+ 56"

General Classification after Stage 3

	Rider	Team	Time
1	Philippe Gilbert (BEL)	Omega Pharma–Lotto	12h 57' 04"
2	Greg Van Avermaet (BEL)	BMC Racing Team	+ 19"
3	Björn Leukemans (BEL)	Vacansoleil–DCM	+ 35"
4	Bert De Waele (BEL)	Landbouwkrediet	+ 1' 02"
5	Niki Terpstra (NED)	Quick-Step	+ 1' 18"
6	Pim Ligthart (NED)	Vacansoleil–DCM	+ 1' 18"
7	Maarten Wynants (BEL)	Rabobank	+ 1' 20"
8	Joost van Leijen (NED)	Vacansoleil–DCM	+ 1' 28"
9	Jens Keukeleire (BEL)	Cofidis	+ 3' 11"
10	Maxime Vantomme (BEL)	Team Katusha	+ 3' 25"

=== Stage 4 ===
29 May 2011 – Oreye (Belgium) to Putte (Belgium), 169.4 km (105.3 mi)

Stage 4 result

	Rider	Team	Time
1	André Greipel (GER)	Omega Pharma–Lotto	3h 51' 43"
2	Aidis Kruopis (LTU)	Landbouwkrediet	s.t.
3	Luca Paolini (ITA)	Team Katusha	s.t.
4	Adrien Petit (FRA)	Cofidis	s.t.
5	Allan Davis (AUS)	Astana	s.t.
6	Michael Van Staeyen (BEL)	Topsport Vlaanderen–Mercator	s.t.
7	Stefan van Dijk (NED)	Veranda's Willems–Accent	s.t.
8	Tom Meeusen (BEL)	Telenet–Fidea	s.t.
9	Pieter Vanspeybrouck (BEL)	Topsport Vlaanderen–Mercator	s.t.
10	Olivier Pardini (BEL)	Wallonie Bruxelles–Crédit Agricole	s.t.

General Classification after Stage 4

	Rider	Team	Time
1	Philippe Gilbert (BEL)	Omega Pharma–Lotto	16h 48' 46"
2	Greg Van Avermaet (BEL)	BMC Racing Team	+ 20"
3	Björn Leukemans (BEL)	Vacansoleil–DCM	+ 36"
4	Bert De Waele (BEL)	Landbouwkrediet	+ 1' 03"
5	Pim Ligthart (NED)	Vacansoleil–DCM	+ 1' 16"
6	Niki Terpstra (NED)	Quick-Step	+ 1' 19"
7	Maarten Wynants (BEL)	Rabobank	+ 1' 21"
8	Joost van Leijen (NED)	Vacansoleil–DCM	+ 1' 29"
9	Jens Keukeleire (BEL)	Cofidis	+ 3' 12"
10	Maxime Vantomme (BEL)	Team Katusha	+ 3' 26"

== Final standings ==
=== General classification ===
	Rider	Team	Time
1	Philippe Gilbert (BEL)	Omega Pharma–Lotto	16h 48' 46"
2	Greg Van Avermaet (BEL)	BMC Racing Team	+ 20"
3	Björn Leukemans (BEL)	Vacansoleil–DCM	+ 36"
4	Bert De Waele (BEL)	Landbouwkrediet	+ 1' 03"
5	Pim Ligthart (NED)	Vacansoleil–DCM	+ 1' 16"
6	Niki Terpstra (NED)	Quick-Step	+ 1' 19"
7	Maarten Wynants (BEL)	Rabobank	+ 1' 21"
8	Joost van Leijen (NED)	Vacansoleil–DCM	+ 1' 29"
9	Jens Keukeleire (BEL)	Cofidis	+ 3' 12"
10	Maxime Vantomme (BEL)	Team Katusha	+ 3' 26"

=== Points classification ===
	Rider	Team	Points
1	André Greipel (GER)	Omega Pharma–Lotto	71
2	Philippe Gilbert (BEL)	Omega Pharma–Lotto	71
3	Aidis Kruopis (LTU)	Landbouwkrediet	65
4	Pim Ligthart (NED)	Vacansoleil–DCM	55
5	Allan Davis (AUS)	Astana	49
6	Tom Boonen (BEL)	Quick-Step	44
7	Greg Van Avermaet (BEL)	BMC Racing Team	41
8	Maarten Wynants (BEL)	Rabobank	39
9	Stefan van Dijk (NED)	Veranda's Willems–Accent	38
10	Maxime Vantomme (BEL)	Team Katusha	37

=== Sprint classification ===
	Rider	Team	Points
1	Marcus Burghardt (GER)	BMC Racing Team	24
2	Michael Schär (SUI)	BMC Racing Team	21
3	Graeme Brown (AUS)	Rabobank	16
4	Philippe Gilbert (BEL)	Omega Pharma–Lotto	16
5	Greg Van Avermaet (BEL)	BMC Racing Team	16
6	Kurt Hovelynck (BEL)	Donckers Koffie–Jelly Belly	15
7	Pim Ligthart (NED)	Vacansoleil–DCM	8
8	Joost van Leijen (NED)	Vacansoleil–DCM	8
9	Steven Van Vooren (BEL)	Topsport Vlaanderen–Mercator	8
10	Luca Paolini (ITA)	Team Katusha	8

=== Young Rider classification ===
	Rider	Team	Time
1	Pim Ligthart (NED)	Vacansoleil–DCM	16h 50' 02"
2	Jens Keukeleire (BEL)	Cofidis	+ 1' 56"
3	Maxime Vantomme (BEL)	Team Katusha	+ 2' 10"
4	Michael Schär (SUI)	BMC Racing Team	+ 2' 27"
5	Pieter Vanspeybrouck (BEL)	Topsport Vlaanderen–Mercator	+ 2' 51"
6	Tom Meeusen (BEL)	Telenet–Fidea	+ 3' 25"
7	Jean-Lou Paiani (FRA)	Saur–Sojasun	+ 7' 24"
8	Wietse Bosmans (BEL)	BKCP–Powerplus	+ 10' 48"
9	Bauke Mollema (NED)	Rabobank	+ 13' 14"
10	Tanel Kangert (EST)	Astana	+ 16' 20"

=== Team classification ===
	Team	Points
1	(Netherlands) Vacansoleil–DCM	50h 29' 14"
2	(Kazakhstan) Astana	+ 3' 01"
3	(Russia) Team Katusha	+ 4' 59"
4	(France) Saur–Sojasun	+ 5' 45"
5	(Belgium) Topsport Vlaanderen–Mercator	+ 7' 44"
6	(Netherlands) Rabobank	+ 16' 08"
7	(Belgium) Quick-Step	+ 20' 35"
8	(United States) BMC Racing Team	+ 21' 50"
9	(Belgium) Landbouwkrediet	+ 22' 23"
10	(France) Cofidis	+ 25' 04"

== Classification leadership table ==
Stage	Winner	General classification Algemeen Klassement	Points classification Puntentrui	Sprints Classification Rushesklassement	Young Rider classification Jongerentrui	Team classification Ploegenklassement
P	Lieuwe Westra	Lieuwe Westra	Lieuwe Westra	Graeme Brown	Jens Debusschere	Omega Pharma–Lotto
1	André Greipel	André Greipel	André Greipel	Graeme Brown	Jens Keukeleire	Omega Pharma–Lotto
2	Aidis Kruopis	Philippe Gilbert	Tom Boonen	Niko Eeckhout	Pim Ligthart	Quick-Step
3	Philippe Gilbert	Philippe Gilbert	Philippe Gilbert	Michael Schär	Pim Ligthart	Vacansoleil–DCM
4	André Greipel	Philippe Gilbert	André Greipel	Marcus Burghardt	Pim Ligthart	Vacansoleil–DCM
Final		Philippe Gilbert	André Greipel	Marcus Burghardt	Pim Ligthart	Vacansoleil–DCM
