= 2011 Three Days of De Panne =

2010–2011 UCI Europe Tour

Race details
- Dates: 29–31 March
- Stages: 4
- Distance: 538.7 km (334.7 mi)
- Winning time: 12 hr 21' 33"

Results
Jersey awarded to the overall winner	Winner	Sébastien Rosseler (Belgium)	(Team RadioShack)
	Second	Lieuwe Westra (Netherlands)	(Vacansoleil–DCM)
	Third	Michał Kwiatkowski (Poland)	(Team RadioShack)
Jersey awarded to the points classification winner	Points	Denis Galimzyanov (Russia)	(Team Katusha)
Jersey awarded to the mountains classification winner	Mountains	Lieuwe Westra (Netherlands)	(Vacansoleil–DCM)
Jersey awarded to the sprints classification winner	Sprints	Bert De Backer (Belgium)	(Skil–Shimano)
	Team	Team RadioShack	

The 2011 Three Days of De Panne (Dutch: 2011 KBC Driedaagse van De Panne-Koksijde) was the 35th edition of the Three Days of De Panne, an annual bicycle race. Taking part in and around the De Panne region of West Flanders, it began in Middelkerke on 29 March and finished in De Panne two days later. The 538.7-kilometre-long (334.7 mi) stage race comprised four stages, with two held on the final day. It was part of the 2010–2011 UCI Europe Tour and was rated as a 2.HC event. Sébastien Rosseler of Team RadioShack won the general classification, his first ever victory in a stage race.

== Teams ==
23 teams were invited to participate in the tour: 12 UCI ProTeams and 11 UCI Professional Continental Teams.

UCI ProTeams
- Vacansoleil–DCM
- Rabobank
- HTC–Highroad
- Omega Pharma–Lotto
- Lampre–ISD
- Team Katusha
- Team Sky
- Liquigas–Cannondale
- Team RadioShack
- Astana
- BMC Racing Team
- Quick-Step
UCI Professional Continental Teams
- Cofidis
- FDJ
- Saur–Sojasun
- Skil–Shimano
- Colnago–CSF Inox
- Team Europcar
- Topsport Vlaanderen–Mercator
- Veranda's Willems–Accent
- Landbouwkrediet
- UnitedHealthcare
- Team NetApp

== Stages ==
=== Stage 1 ===
29 March 2011 – Middelkerke to Zottegem, 194.0 km (120.5 mi)

Stage 1 Result
	Rider	Team	Time
1	André Greipel (GER)	Omega Pharma–Lotto	4h 22' 33"
2	Lieuwe Westra (NED)	Vacansoleil–DCM	+ 0"
3	Dmitriy Muravyev (KAZ)	Team RadioShack	+ 0"
4	Vladimir Gusev (RUS)	Team Katusha	+ 0"
5	Romain Feillu (FRA)	Vacansoleil–DCM	+ 0"
6	Peter Sagan (SVK)	Liquigas–Cannondale	+ 0"
7	Danilo Hondo (GER)	Lampre–ISD	+ 0"
8	Allan Davis (AUS)	Astana	+ 0"
9	Mark Renshaw (AUS)	HTC–Highroad	+ 0"
10	Yauheni Hutarovich (BLR)	FDJ	+ 0"

General Classification after Stage 1
	Rider	Team	Time
1	André Greipel (GER)	Omega Pharma–Lotto	4h 22' 22"
2	Bert De Backer (BEL)	Skil–Shimano	+ 3"
3	Lieuwe Westra (NED)	Vacansoleil–DCM	+ 5"
4	Pim Ligthart (NED)	Vacansoleil–DCM	+ 5"
5	Dmitriy Muravyev (KAZ)	Team RadioShack	+ 7"
6	Mickaël Delage (FRA)	FDJ	+ 9"
7	Vladimir Gusev (RUS)	Team Katusha	+ 11"
8	Romain Feillu (FRA)	Vacansoleil–DCM	+ 11"
9	Peter Sagan (SVK)	Liquigas–Cannondale	+ 11"
10	Danilo Hondo (GER)	Lampre–ISD	+ 11"

=== Stage 2 ===
30 March 2011 – Oudenaarde to Koksijde, 219.0 km (136.1 mi)

Stage 2 Result
	Rider	Team	Time
1	Denis Galimzyanov (RUS)	Team Katusha	5h 08' 18"
2	John Degenkolb (GER)	HTC–Highroad	+ 0"
3	Peter Sagan (SVK)	Liquigas–Cannondale	+ 0"
4	Tomas Vaitkus (LIT)	Astana	+ 0"
5	Romain Feillu (FRA)	Vacansoleil–DCM	+ 0"
6	Aidis Kruopis (LIT)	Landbouwkrediet	+ 0"
7	Russell Downing (GBR)	Team Sky	+ 0"
8	Yauheni Hutarovich (BLR)	FDJ	+ 0"
9	Jimmy Casper (FRA)	Saur–Sojasun	+ 0"
10	Michał Kwiatkowski (POL)	Team RadioShack	+ 0"

General Classification after Stage 2
	Rider	Team	Time
1	Lieuwe Westra (NED)	Vacansoleil–DCM	9h 30' 43"
2	Bert De Backer (BEL)	Skil–Shimano	+ 0"
3	John Degenkolb (GER)	HTC–Highroad	+ 2"
4	Arnoud van Groen (NED)	Veranda's Willems–Accent	+ 2"
5	Peter Sagan (SVK)	Liquigas–Cannondale	+ 4"
6	Dmitriy Muravyev (KAZ)	Team RadioShack	+ 4"
7	Grega Bole (SLO)	Lampre–ISD	+ 5"
8	Mickaël Delage (FRA)	FDJ	+ 6"
9	Romain Feillu (FRA)	Vacansoleil–DCM	+ 8"
10	Yauheni Hutarovich (BLR)	FDJ	+ 8"

=== Stage 3a ===
31 March 2011 – De Panne to De Panne, 111.0 km (69.0 mi)

Stage 3a Result
	Rider	Team	Time
1	Jacopo Guarnieri (ITA)	Liquigas–Cannondale	2h 32' 11"
2	Denis Galimzyanov (RUS)	Team Katusha	+ 0"
3	Jimmy Casper (FRA)	Saur–Sojasun	+ 0"
4	Kenny van Hummel (NED)	Skil–Shimano	+ 0"
5	Alexander Kristoff (NOR)	BMC Racing Team	+ 0"
6	Gerald Ciolek (GER)	Quick-Step	+ 0"
7	Michał Kwiatkowski (POL)	Team RadioShack	+ 0"
8	Mirco Lorenzetto (ITA)	Astana	+ 0"
9	Jake Keough (CAN)	UnitedHealthcare	+ 0"
10	Stijn Neirynck (BEL)	Topsport Vlaanderen–Mercator	+ 0"

General Classification after Stage 3a
	Rider	Team	Time
1	Bert De Backer (BEL)	Skil–Shimano	12h 02' 52"
2	Lieuwe Westra (NED)	Vacansoleil–DCM	+ 2"
3	Arnoud van Groen (NED)	Veranda's Willems–Accent	+ 4"
4	Dmitriy Muravyev (KAZ)	Team RadioShack	+ 6"
5	Romain Feillu (FRA)	Vacansoleil–DCM	+ 7"
6	Aidis Kruopis (LIT)	Landbouwkrediet	+ 10"
7	James Vanlandschoot (BEL)	Veranda's Willems–Accent	+ 10"
8	Stijn Neirynck (BEL)	Topsport Vlaanderen–Mercator	+ 10"
9	Mark Renshaw (AUS)	HTC–Highroad	+ 10"
10	Vladimir Gusev (RUS)	Team Katusha	+ 10"

=== Stage 3b ===
31 March 2011 – De Panne to Koksijde to De Panne, 14.7 km (9.1 mi) individual time trial (ITT)

Stage 3b Result
	Rider	Team	Time
1	Sébastien Rosseler (BEL)	Team RadioShack	18' 31"
2	Lieuwe Westra (NED)	Vacansoleil–DCM	+ 14"
3	Michał Kwiatkowski (POL)	Team RadioShack	+ 14"
4	Sylvain Chavanel (FRA)	Quick-Step	+ 18"
5	Bert Grabsch (GER)	HTC–Highroad	+ 22"
6	Andriy Hrivko (UKR)	Astana	+ 24"
7	Dmitriy Muravyev (KAZ)	Team RadioShack	+ 30"
8	Rick Flens (NED)	Rabobank	+ 30"
9	Tomas Vaitkus (LIT)	Astana	+ 34"
10	Cyril Lemoine (FRA)	Saur–Sojasun	+ 50"

Final General Classification
	Rider	Team	Time
1	Sébastien Rosseler (BEL)	Team RadioShack	12h 21' 33"
2	Lieuwe Westra (NED)	Vacansoleil–DCM	+ 6"
3	Michał Kwiatkowski (POL)	Team RadioShack	+ 14"
4	Sylvain Chavanel (FRA)	Quick-Step	+ 18"
5	Bert Grabsch (GER)	HTC–Highroad	+ 22"
6	Andriy Hrivko (UKR)	Astana	+ 24"
7	Dmitriy Muravyev (KAZ)	Team RadioShack	+ 26"
8	Rick Flens (NED)	Rabobank	+ 30"
9	Tomas Vaitkus (LIT)	Astana	+ 34"
10	Cyril Lemoine (FRA)	Saur–Sojasun	+ 50"

== Classification leadership ==
Stage by stage leadership
Stage	Winner	General classification	Points classification	Mountains classification	Sprints classification	Team classification	Combativity award
1	André Greipel	André Greipel	André Greipel	Laurens De Vreese	Bert De Backer	Vacansoleil–DCM	Pim Ligthart
2	Denis Galimzyanov	Lieuwe Westra	Peter Sagan	Laurens De Vreese	Bert De Backer	Vacansoleil–DCM	Guillaume Van Keirsbulck
3a	Jacopo Guarnieri	Bert De Backer	Denis Galimzyanov	Lieuwe Westra	Bert De Backer	Skil–Shimano	Frederico Canuti
3b	Sébastien Rosseler	Sébastien Rosseler	Denis Galimzyanov	Lieuwe Westra	Bert De Backer	Team RadioShack	Lieuwe Westra
Final		Sébastien Rosseler	Denis Galimzyanov	Lieuwe Westra	Bert De Backer	Team RadioShack	no award

== Final standings ==
General classification
	Rider	Team	Time
1	Sébastien Rosseler (BEL)	Team RadioShack	12h 21' 33"
2	Lieuwe Westra (NED)	Vacansoleil–DCM	+ 6"
3	Michał Kwiatkowski (POL)	Team RadioShack	+ 14"
4	Sylvain Chavanel (FRA)	Quick-Step	+ 18"
5	Bert Grabsch (GER)	HTC–Highroad	+ 22"
6	Andriy Hrivko (UKR)	Astana	+ 24"
7	Dmitriy Muravyev (KAZ)	Team RadioShack	+ 26"
8	Rick Flens (NED)	Rabobank	+ 30"
9	Tomas Vaitkus (LIT)	Astana	+ 34"
10	Cyril Lemoine (FRA)	Saur–Sojasun	+ 50"

Points classification
	Rider	Team	Points
1	Denis Galimzyanov (RUS)	Team Katusha	29
2	Lieuwe Westra (NED)	Vacansoleil–DCM	27
3	Romain Feillu (FRA)	Vacansoleil–DCM	24
4	John Degenkolb (GER)	HTC–Highroad	23
5	André Greipel (GER)	Omega Pharma–Lotto	20
6	Dmitriy Muravyev (KAZ)	Team RadioShack	20
7	Michał Kwiatkowski (POL)	Team RadioShack	18
8	Tomas Vaitkus (LIT)	Astana	16
9	Jimmy Casper (FRA)	Saur–Sojasun	15
10	Vladimir Gusev (RUS)	Team Katusha	14

Mountains classification
	Rider	Team	Points
1	Lieuwe Westra (NED)	Vacansoleil–DCM	15
2	Dmitriy Muravyev (KAZ)	Team RadioShack	8
3	Michał Kwiatkowski (POL)	Team RadioShack	7
4	Vladimir Gusev (RUS)	Team Katusha	4
5	Bert De Backer (BEL)	Skil–Shimano	3
6	Jens Debusschere (BEL)	Omega Pharma–Lotto	3
7	André Greipel (GER)	Omega Pharma–Lotto	2

Sprints classification
	Rider	Team	Time
1	Bert De Backer (BEL)	Skil–Shimano	10
2	Arnoud van Groen (NED)	Veranda's Willems–Accent	6
3	Guillaume Van Keirsbulck (BEL)	Quick-Step	5
4	Romain Feillu (FRA)	Vacansoleil–DCM	3
5	Lieuwe Westra (NED)	Vacansoleil–DCM	2
6	André Greipel (GER)	Omega Pharma–Lotto	1
7	Jimmy Casper (FRA)	Saur–Sojasun	1
8	Jens Debusschere (BEL)	Omega Pharma–Lotto	1

Team classification
Pos.	Team	Time
1	Team RadioShack	37h 05' 23"
2	HTC–Highroad	+ 2' 28"
3	Astana	+ 3' 08"
4	Rabobank	+ 3' 16"
5	Liquigas–Cannondale	+ 3' 34"
6	Skil–Shimano	+ 4' 22"
7	Quick-Step	+ 4' 40"
8	Omega Pharma–Lotto	+ 4' 58"
9	Veranda's Willems–Accent	+ 5' 36"
