= Breyne =

Breyne is a surname. Notable people with the surname include:

- Jacob Breyne (1637–1697), German merchant and botanist
- Johann Philipp Breyne (1680–1764), German botanist, palaeontologist, zoologist and entomologist
- Jonathan Breyne (born 1991), Belgian cyclist
- Paul Breyne (born 1947), Belgian politician
