= Bert De Waele =

Belgian cyclist

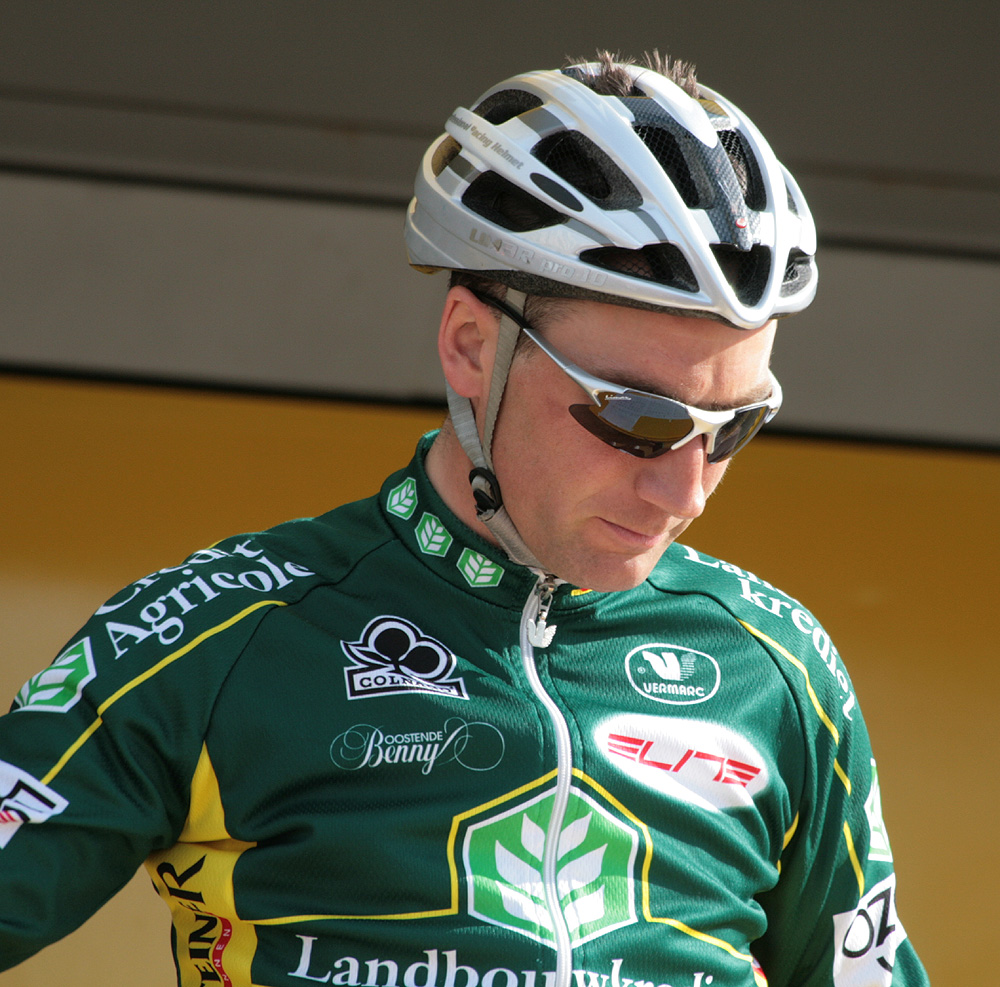
- De Waele at the 2008 Liège–Bastogne–Liège.

Personal information
- Full name: Bert De Waele
- Born: 21 July 1975 (age 51) Deinze, Belgium
- Height: 1.79 m (5 ft 10 in)
- Weight: 70 kg (154 lb)

Cycling career
- Sport: Cycling
- Current team: Retired
- Discipline: Road
- Role: Rider

Amateur teams
- 1999–2000: Groeninge Spurters
- 2000: Tönissteiner–Colnago (stagiaire)

Professional team
- 2001–2012: Landbouwkrediet–Colnago

Bert De Waele (born 21 July 1975) is a Belgian retired professional road racing cyclist, who competed as a professional between 2001 and 2012. He spent his entire career with the Landbouwkrediet–Colnago team through various iterations of team names.

== Palmarès ==
1999
6th Flèche Namuroise
10th Zellik–Galmaarden
2000
10th Hasselt–Spa–Hasselt
2001
2nd Tour du Doubs
9th Eurode Omloop
2002
4th Tour du Doubs
7th Tour de Vendée
2003
1st Tour du Doubs
5th Nokere Koerse
8th Grand Prix Pino Cerami
10th Memorial Rik Van Steenbergen
2004
1st Cholet-Pays de Loire
1st Omloop van het Houtland
2nd Overall Tour de Wallonie
2nd Brussels–Ingooigem
3rd Tour du Doubs
4th Grand Prix de Wallonie
2005
2nd Grand Prix Pino Cerami
4th Flèche Hesbignonne
5th Omloop Het Volk
6th Brussels–Ingooigem
8th Overall Ster Elektrotoer
8th Nokere Koerse
8th Tour du Doubs
2006
2nd Omloop Het Volk
2nd Internationale Wielertrofee Jong Maar Moedig
2nd De Drie Zustersteden
3rd Schaal Sels-Merksem
4th E3 Prijs Vlaanderen
5th Tour du Haut Var
5th Grand Prix Pino Cerami
6th Overall Rheinland-Pfalz Rundfahrt
6th Overall Tour de Luxembourg
6th Rund um die Hainleite
6th Druivenkoers Overijse
2007
1st De Drie Zustersteden
1st Grand Prix de Wallonie
3rd Grand Prix Pino Cerami
3rd Polynormande
5th Halle–Ingooigem
6th Overall Rheinland-Pfalz Rundfahrt
7th Druivenkoers Overijse
8th Overall Tour of Belgium
10th Grote Prijs Stad Zottegem
2008
2nd Cholet-Pays De Loire
4th Grote Prijs Jef Scherens
4th Paris–Brussels
5th Overall Étoile de Bessèges
5th Grand Prix de Wallonie
7th Overall Tour of Belgium
7th Tour du Haut Var
8th Grand Prix de la Somme
9th Overall Paris–Corrèze
10th Rund um den Henninger Turm
2009
2nd Druivenkoers Overijse
4th Overall Paris–Corrèze
4th Eschborn-Frankfurt City Loop
4th Polynormande
4th Grand Prix de Wallonie
7th Overall Tour of Belgium

1st Stage 4

8th Overall Circuit de Lorraine
10th Tour of Flanders
10th Grote Prijs Jef Scherens
2010
2nd Overall Tour du Haut Var
4th Amstel Gold Race
6th Grand Prix Pino Cerami
9th Internationale Wielertrofee Jong Maar Moedig
2011
2nd Overall Paris–Corrèze

1st Stage 2

2nd Internationale Wielertrofee Jong Maar Moedig
4th Overall Tour of Belgium
4th Grand Prix de Wallonie
7th Overall Tour de Wallonie
9th Hel van het Mergelland
10th Grand Prix Pino Cerami
10th Grand Prix de la Somme
2012
6th Grand Prix de Wallonie
10th Grand Prix d'Ouverture La Marseillaise
10th Internationale Wielertrofee Jong Maar Moedig
