= Kevin Claeys =

Belgian cyclist

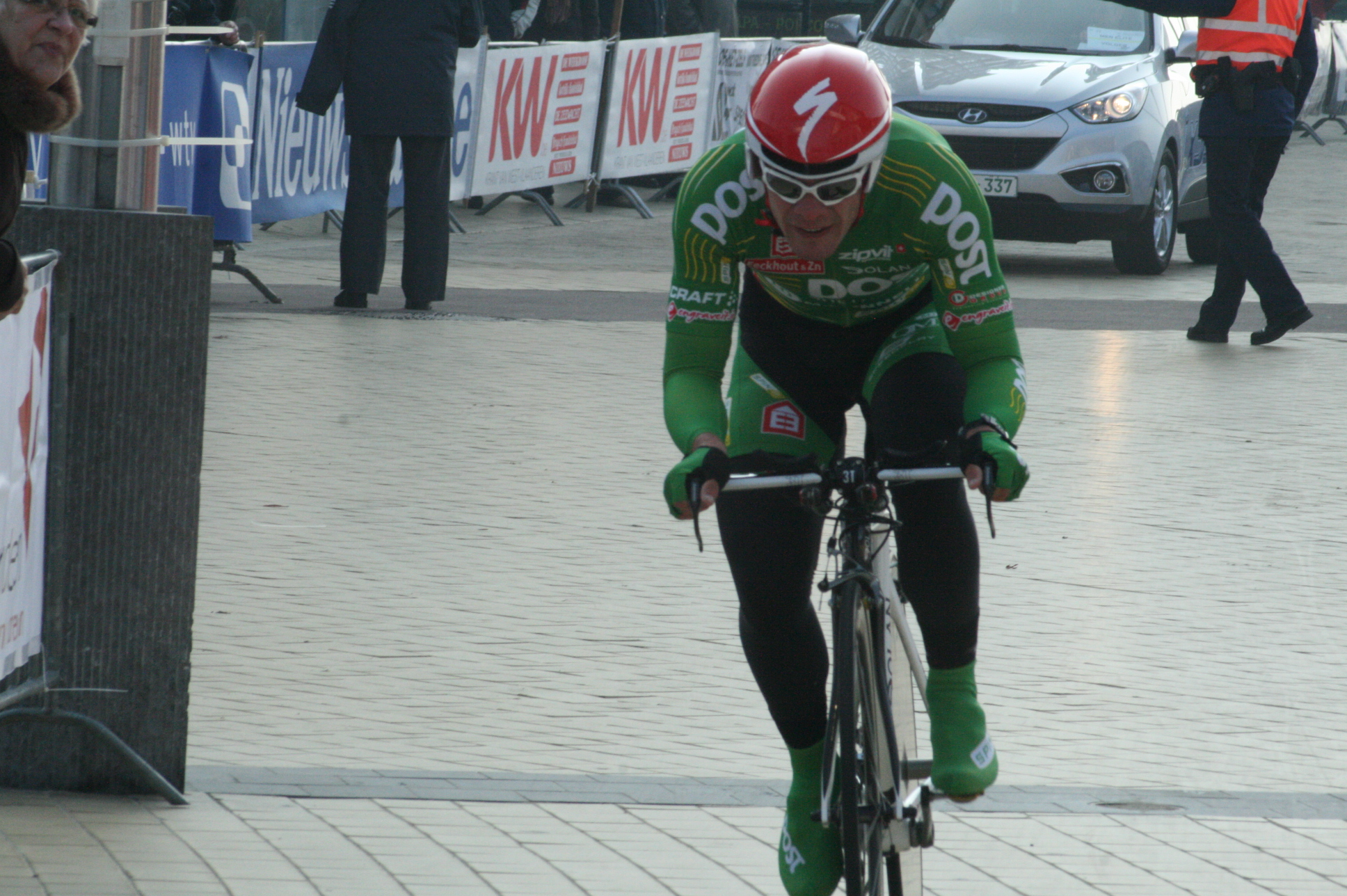
- Claeys in 2011

Personal information
- Full name: Kevin Claeys
- Born: 26 March 1988 (age 38) Roeselare, Belgium

Cycling career
- Sport: Cycling
- Current team: Retired
- Discipline: Road
- Role: Rider

Amateur teams
- 2016: Douchy–Thalassa Oostende
- 2016: Wetterse Dakwerken–Trawobo–VDM
- 2017: Asfra Racing Team Oudenaarde

Professional teams
- 2011: An Post–Sean Kelly
- 2012–2013: Landbouwkrediet–Euphony
- 2014: An Post–Chain Reaction
- 2015: Colba–Superano Ham

Kevin Claeys (born 26 March 1988) is a Belgian former professional cyclist.

== Major results ==
2010
2nd Zellik–Galmaarden
2nd Dwars door de Antwerpse Kempen
2012
1st Ronde van Limburg
1st De Kustpijl
3rd Antwerpse Havenpijl
3rd Circuit de Wallonie
2013
2nd Ronde van Limburg
