= Tom Devriendt =

Belgian cyclist

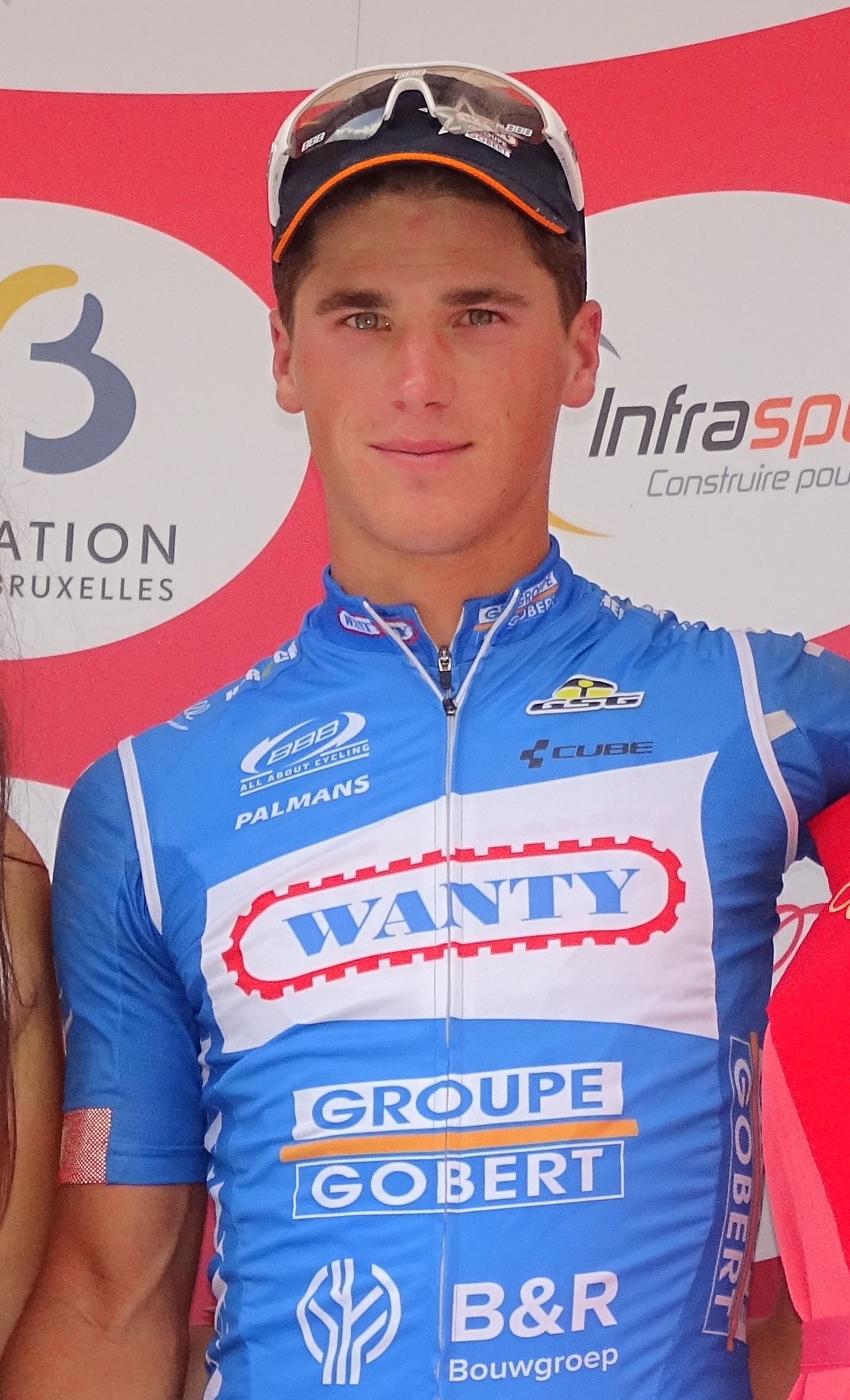
- Devriendt at the 2015 Grand Prix Pino Cerami.

Personal information
- Full name: Tom Devriendt
- Born: 29 October 1991 (age 34) Veurne, Belgium
- Height: 1.76 m (5 ft 9 in)
- Weight: 70 kg (154 lb)

Cycling career
- Sport: Cycling
- Current team: Pinarello–Q36.5 Pro Cycling Team
- Discipline: Road
- Role: Rider
- Rider type: Classics specialist

Amateur teams
- 2010: New Heebra–Lombarden
- 2011–2013: EFC–Quick-Step

Professional teams
- 2014: Team3M
- 2015–2022: Wanty–Groupe Gobert
- 2023–2024: Q36.5 Pro Cycling Team

Tom Devriendt (born 29 October 1991) is a Belgian former racing cyclist, who competed as a professional from 2014 to 2024.

== Major results ==
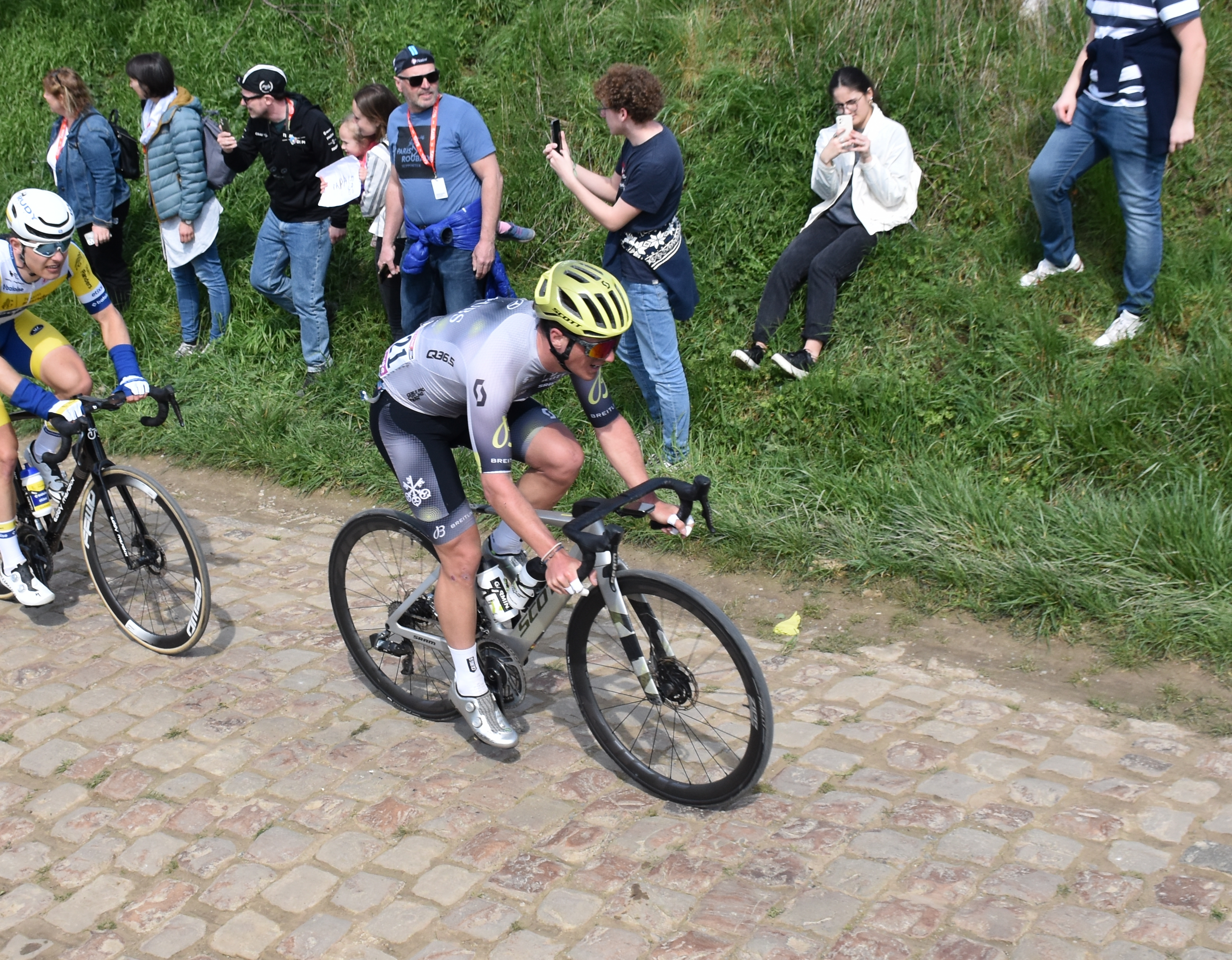
Paris-Roubaix 2023 - Secteur pavé de Quiévy à Saint-Python - N° 221 Tom Devriendt.

2011
1st Dwars door de Antwerpse Kempen
2013
3rd Grote Prijs Stad Geel
2014
3rd Omloop van het Waasland
2015
3rd Grand Prix Pino Cerami
2016
6th Eschborn-Frankfurt
8th Overall Tour de Picardie
2017
1st Omloop van het Houtland
3rd Binche–Chimay–Binche
3rd Omloop Eurometropool
7th Paris–Bourges
2018
7th Great War Remembrance Race
2019
1st Stage 2 Tour of Austria
5th Grote Prijs Stad Zottegem
2021
4th Grote Prijs Jef Scherens
8th Trofeo Alcudia – Port d'Alcudia
2022
4th Paris–Roubaix
6th Schaal Sels
7th Dwars door het Hageland
