= Julien Vermote (cyclist, born 1949) =

Belgian cyclist

Personal information
- Full name: Julien Vermote
- Born: 2 October 1949 (age 77) Kortrijk, Belgium

Cycling career
- Sport: Cycling
- Disciplines: Road and Track
- Role: Rider

Professional teams
- 1972: Beaulieu – Flandria
- 1973: Novy – Romy Pils – Total – Dubble Bubble

Julien Vermote (born 2 October 1949 in Kortrijk, Belgium) is a former Belgian professional road and track cyclist. His booked his mayor victory during De Vlaamse Pijl in 1968 and 1970. His father and the grandfather of his namesake and fellow professional cyclist Julien Vermote were nephews.

== Palmarès ==
1968
1st, De Vlaamse Pijl
1969
2nd, De Vlaamse Pijl
1970
1st, De Vlaamse Pijl
