= Jan Kuyckx =

Belgian cyclist

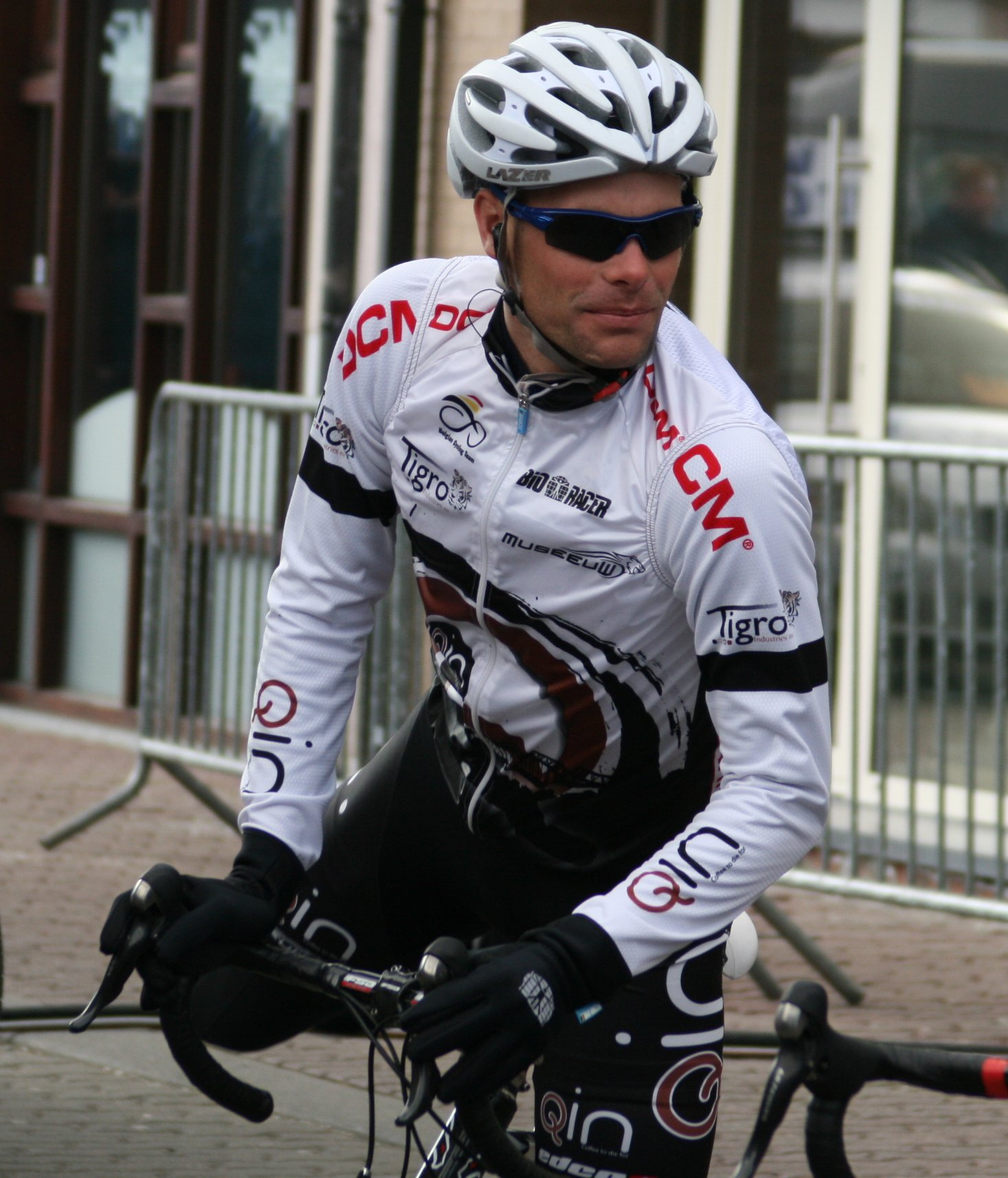

Personal information
- Born: 20 May 1979 (age 47) Hasselt, Belgium

Cycling career
- Sport: Cycling
- Current team: Retired
- Discipline: Road
- Role: Rider

Professional teams
- 2005–2006: Davitamon–Lotto
- 2007–2008: Landbouwkrediet–Tönissteiner
- 2009: Verandas Willems
- 2010: Qin Cycling Team
- 2011–2012: Marco Polo

Jan Kuyckx (born 20 May 1979 in Hasselt) is a Belgian former racing cyclist.

== Major results ==
1997
1st Junior National Time Trial Championships
1999
1st U23 National Road Race Championships
2001
1st Stage 10 Girobio
3rd Zellik–Galmaarden
2003
2nd Brussels–Ingooigem
2004
1st Stages 1 & 3 Vuelta a La Rioja
1st Stage 6 Tour of Austria
2005
1st Stage 4 Tour of Belgium
2006
2nd Halle–Ingooigem
2008
1st Stage 1 Étoile de Bessèges
2nd Paris–Tours
2010
1st Grote 1-MeiPrijs
