= Bert Scheirlinckx =

Belgian cyclist

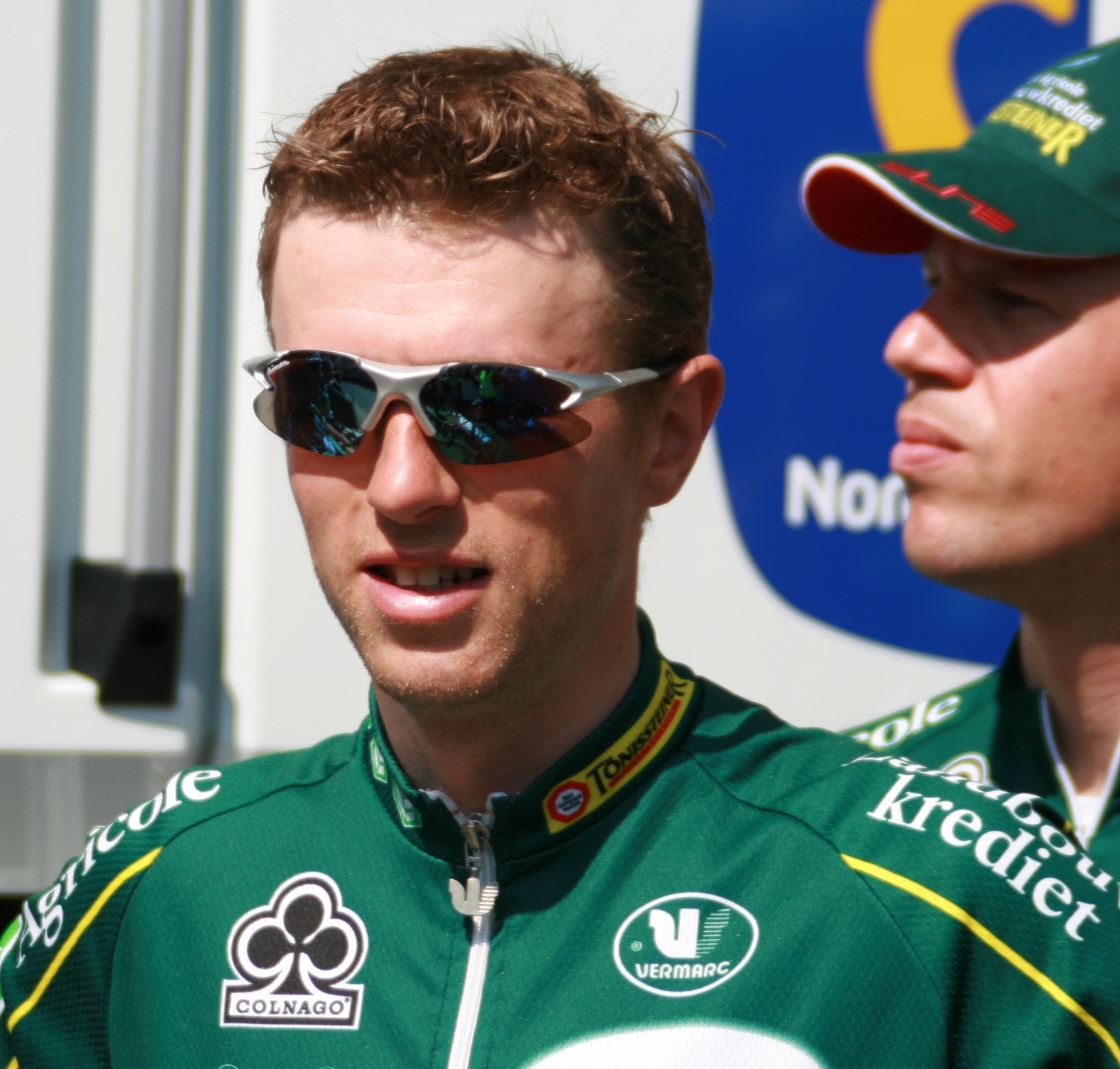
- Scheirlinckx at the 2008 Four Days of Dunkirk

Personal information
- Born: 1 November 1974 (age 51) Zottegem, Belgium
- Height: 1.84 m (6 ft 0 in)
- Weight: 67 kg (148 lb)

Cycling career
- Sport: Cycling
- Current team: Retired
- Discipline: Road
- Role: Rider

Amateur team
- 1999: TVM–Farm Frites (stagiaire)

Professional teams
- 2000–2001: Collstrop–De Federale Verzekeringen
- 2002–2005: RDM–Flanders
- 2006: Jartazi–7Mobile
- 2007–2011: Landbouwkrediet–Tönissteiner
- 2012: Geofco–Ville d'Alger

Bert Scheirlinckx (born 1 November 1974) is a Belgian former professional road bicycle racer.

== Major results ==
2002
3rd Overall Tour of Japan

1st Stage 2 Tour of Japan

2003
4th Rund um Köln
2004
3rd Tro-Bro Léon
3rd Tour du Finistère
3rd Druivenkoers Overijse
2006
1st Stadsprijs Geraardsbergen
2nd Polynormande
3rd Hel van het Mergelland
2009
3rd Flèche flamande
3rd Druivenkoers Overijse
2010
3rd Eschborn–Frankfurt
2011
2nd Classic Loire Atlantique
1st Grand Prix Pino Cerami
1st Internationale Wielertrofee Jong Maar Moedig
