= Jonathan Breyne =

Belgian cyclist (born 1991)

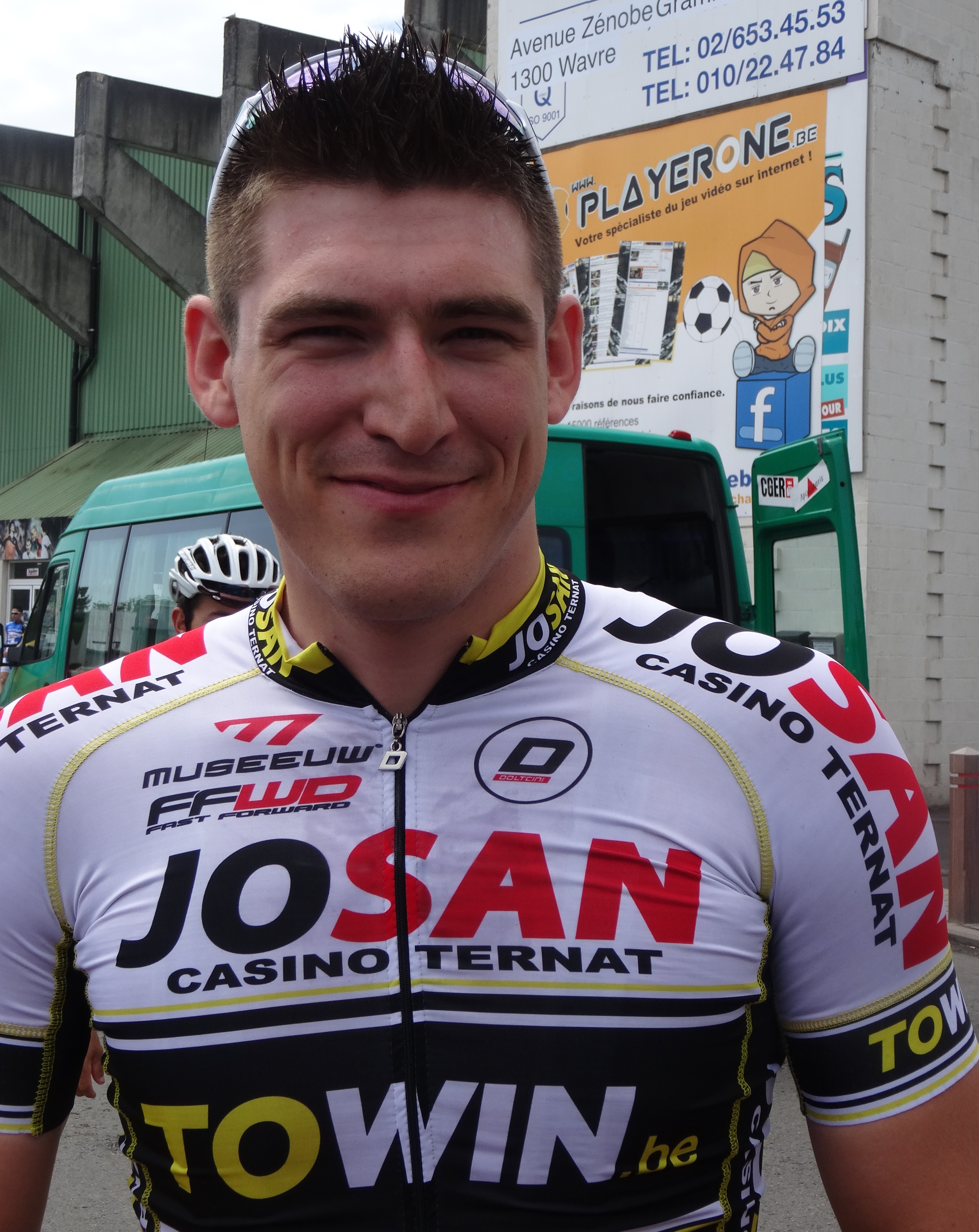
- Breyne in 2014

Personal information
- Full name: Jonathan Breyne
- Born: 4 January 1991 (age 35) Menen, Belgium

Cycling career
- Sport: Cycling
- Current team: Gaverzicht–BE Okay
- Discipline: Road
- Role: Rider

Amateur team
- 2018–: Meubelen Gaverzicht–Glascentra CT

Professional teams
- 2010: Qin Cycling Team
- 2011–2013: Landbouwkrediet
- 2014: Josan–To Win
- 2015–2016: Veranclassic–Ekoi
- 2017: Tarteletto–Isorex

Jonathan Breyne (born 4 January 1991) is a Belgian cyclist, who currently rides for Belgian amateur team Gaverzicht–BE Okay.

In 2013, Breyne was accused of using illegal drugs following the discovery of clenbuterol in a sample taken following his participation in the Japan Cup. Breyne was cleared by the Union Cycliste Internationale, who accepted the drug had entered his system as a result of eating contaminated meat while taking part in a race in China.

In 2016, Breyne signed a contract with the Belgian continental team Tarteletto–Isorex.

== Major results ==
2008
1st Overall Keizer der Juniores
2009
1st Stage 2 Ster van Zuid-Limburg
1st Stage 5 Coupe Du Président De La Ville De Grudziadz
1st Stage 3 Trophée Centre Morbihan
2010
1st Time trial, National Under-23 Road Championships
2012
2nd Grand Prix Criquielion
2013
8th Overall Tour of Taihu Lake

1st Stage 8

2015
6th UAE Cup
