= Cyril Lemoine =

Road bicycle racer

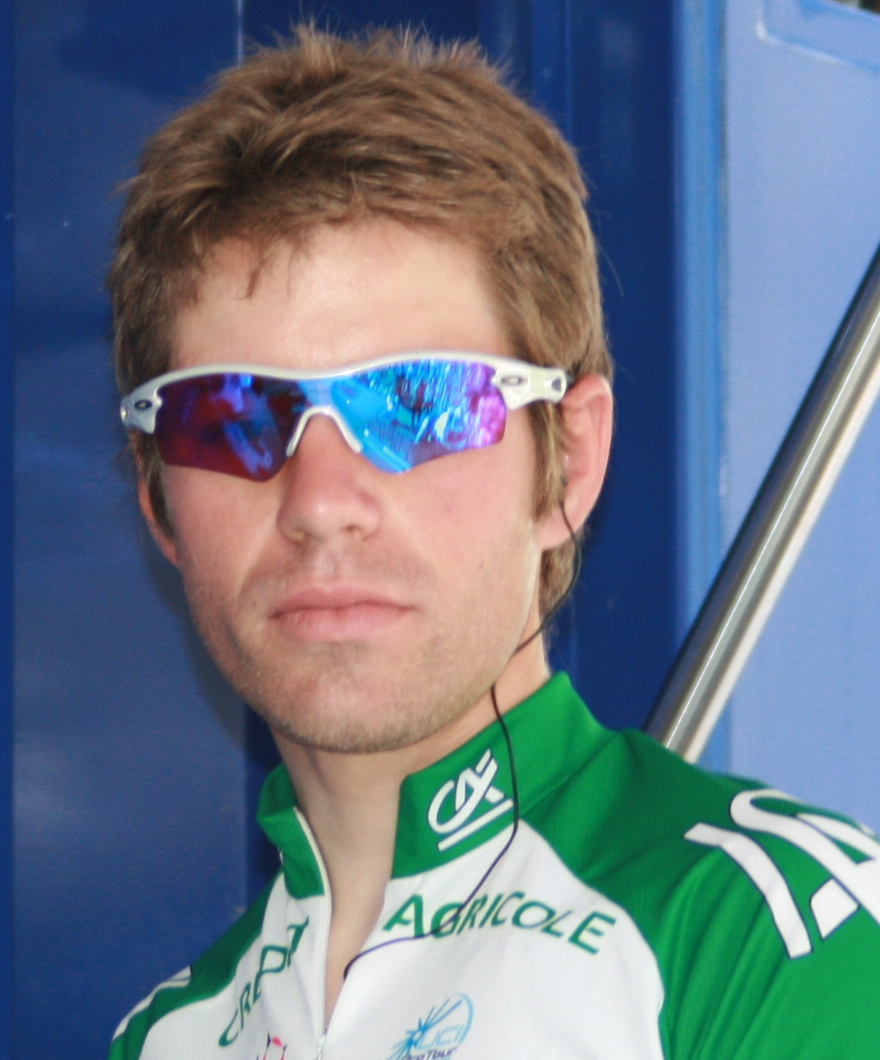

Personal information
- Full name: Cyril Lemoine
- Born: 3 March 1983 (age 43) Tours, France
- Height: 1.81 m (5 ft 11 in)
- Weight: 70 kg (154 lb)

Cycling career
- Sport: Cycling
- Discipline: Road
- Role: Rider

Amateur teams
- 2002: St-Cyr-sur-Loire UC
- 2003: UC Châteauroux
- 2004: Crédit Agricole Espoirs

Professional teams
- 2005–2008: Crédit Agricole
- 2009: Skil–Shimano
- 2010–2013: Saur–Sojasun
- 2014–2020: Cofidis
- 2021–2022: B&B Hotels p/b KTM

Cyril Lemoine (born 3 March 1983) is a French former professional road bicycle racer, who competed as a professional from 2005 to 2022.

== Career ==
Born in Tours, Lemoine joined Cofidis for the 2014 season, after his previous team – Sojasun – folded at the end of the 2013 season. He remained with the team until the end of the 2020 season, when he signed a one-year contract with B&B Hotels–Vital Concept, later renamed B&B Hotels p/b KTM for the 2021 season.

In June 2021, Lemoine was forced to abandon the 2021 Tour de France, after being involved in a crash on the opening stage, suffering broken ribs and a collapsed lung.

== Major results ==
2003
3rd Paris–Mantes-en-Yvelines
2004
1st Stage 3 Tour du Tarn-et-Garonne
2nd Overall Boucles de la Mayenne
2006
8th Overall Tour de Luxembourg

1st Young rider classification

2009
3rd Overall Four Days of Dunkirk
3rd Grote Prijs Stad Zottegem
4th Châteauroux Classic
5th Overall Critérium International
2010
7th Tro-Bro Léon
10th Overall Tour of Belgium
2011
9th Grand Prix de Fourmies
10th Overall Three Days of De Panne
10th Paris–Brussels
2012
5th Overall Paris–Corrèze
7th Overall Circuit de Lorraine
7th Châteauroux Classic
8th Overall Boucles de la Mayenne

1st Points classification

2013
5th La Roue Tourangelle
6th Tro-Bro Léon
9th Paris–Bourges
2014
3rd Overall Tour du Poitou-Charentes
6th Overall Tour of Belgium
10th Paris–Bourges
Tour de France

Held after Stages 2–7

2015
7th Dwars door Vlaanderen
2019
10th Primus Classic
2021
10th Bredene Koksijde Classic

=== Grand Tour general classification results timeline ===
Grand Tour	2006	2007	2008	2009	2010	2011	2012	2013	2014	2015	2016	2017	2018	2019	2020	2021	2022
Giro d'Italia	Has not contested during his career																
Tour de France	—	—	—	144	—	—	136	112	110	—	137	128	—	—	—	DNF	113
/ Vuelta a España	134	—	100	—	—	—	—	—	—	61	—	—	—	—	—	—	—

Legend
—	Did not compete
DNF	Did not finish
