= Arnoud van Groen =

Dutch cyclist

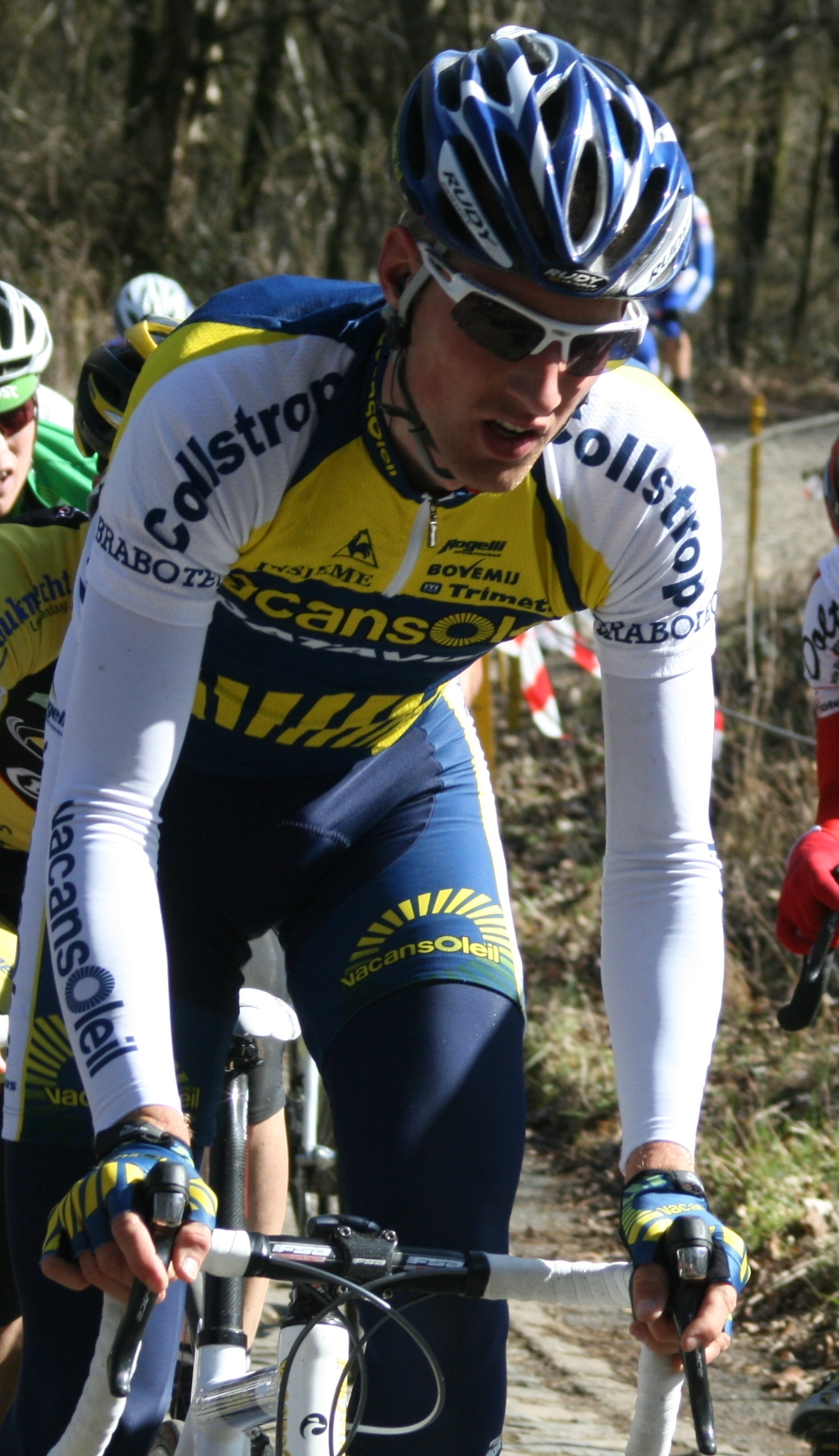

Personal information
- Born: 11 December 1983 (age 42) Monnickendam, Netherlands

Cycling career
- Sport: Cycling
- Current team: Retired
- Discipline: Road
- Role: Rider

Professional teams
- 2004: Moser - AH.nl
- 2005-2006: Team Löwik Meubelen–Van Losser
- 2007: Cyclingteam Jo Piels
- 2008-2010: P3 Transfer-Batavus
- 2011-2012: Veranda's Willems-Accent

Arnoud van Groen (born 11 December 1983 in Monnickendam) is a Dutch cyclist.

== Palmares ==
2007
2nd Ster van Zwolle
2008
2nd Ster van Zwolle
2010
2nd Dwars door Drenthe
2nd Halle–Ingooigem
