= Frédéric Amorison =

Belgian cyclist (born 1978)

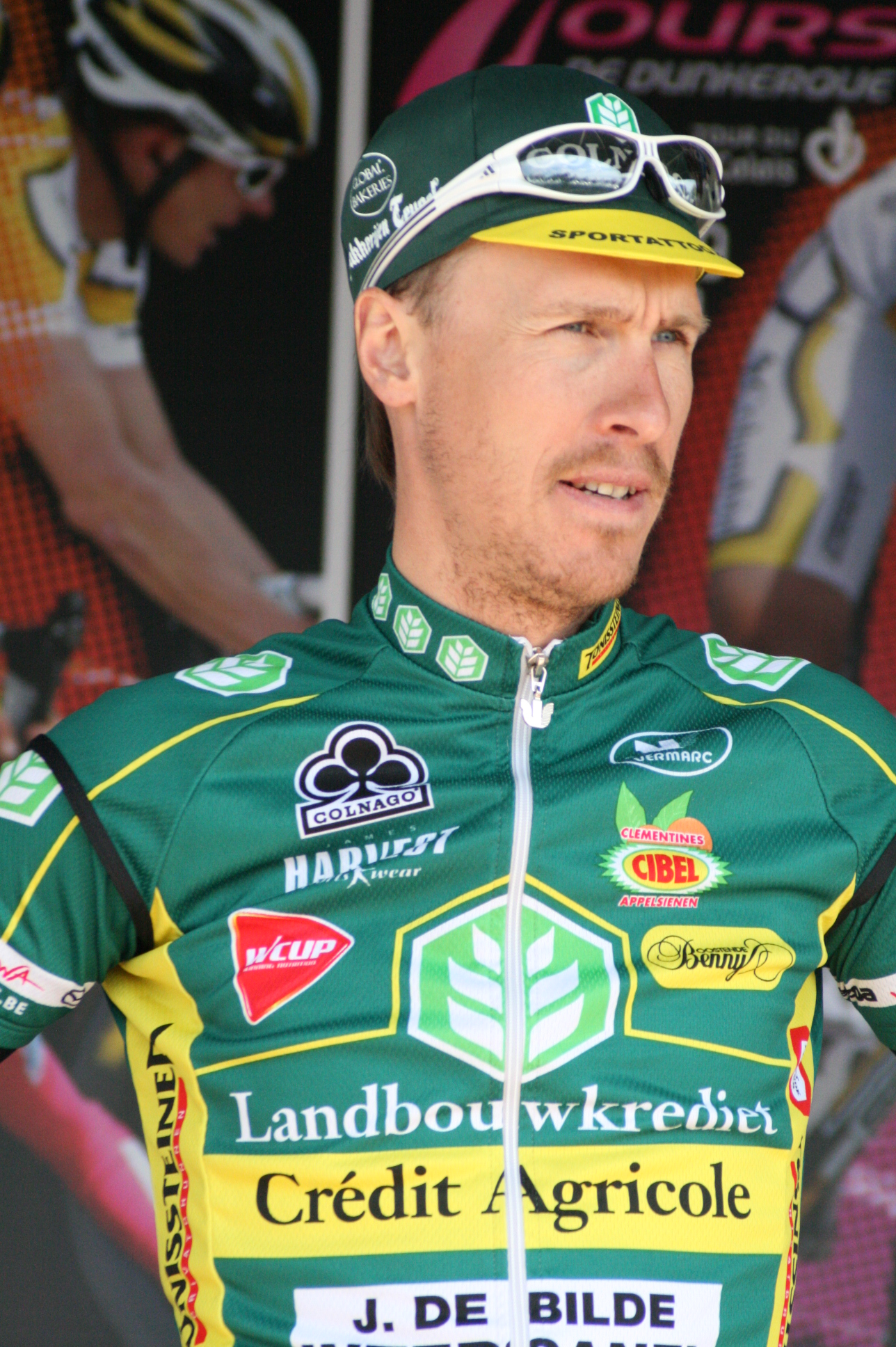
- Amorison at the 2010 Four Days of Dunkirk.

Personal information
- Full name: Frédéric Amorison
- Born: 16 February 1978 (age 48) Belœil, Belgium
- Height: 1.84 m (6 ft 1/2 in)
- Weight: 70 kg (150 lb)

Cycling career
- Sport: Cycling
- Current team: Retired
- Discipline: Road
- Role: Rider

Amateur team
- 2001: Lotto–Adecco (stagiaire)

Professional teams
- 2002: Lotto–Adecco
- 2003–2004: Quick-Step–Davitamon
- 2005: Davitamon–Lotto
- 2006–2013: Landbouwkrediet–Colnago
- 2014: Wallonie-Bruxelles

Frédéric Amorison (born 16 February 1978) is a retired Belgian professional road bicycle racer who last rode for UCI Continental team Wallonie-Bruxelles.

Amorison left Crelan–Euphony at the end of the 2013 season, and joined Wallonie-Bruxelles for the 2014 season.

== Major results ==
2002
1st Sparkassen Giro Bochum
1st Stage 2 Tour de la Région Wallonne
4th Grand Prix d'Isbergues
6th Grote Prijs Stad Zottegem
9th Grand Prix de Fourmies
2005
3rd Delta Profronde van Midden-Zeeland
7th Schaal Sels-Merksem
2006
3rd Rund um die Hainleite
4th Grote Prijs Jef Scherens
4th Kampioenschap van Vlaanderen
4th Omloop van het Houtland
6th Le Samyn
7th Paris–Brussels
9th Grand Prix de Fourmies
10th Overall Driedaagse van West-Vlaanderen
10th Overall Tour of Belgium
2007
3rd Grote Prijs Jef Scherens
4th Dutch Food Valley Classic
5th Kampioenschap van Vlaanderen
6th Grote Prijs Stad Zottegem
8th Kuurne–Brussels–Kuurne
8th Tour de Rijke
2008
4th Overall Driedaagse van West-Vlaanderen
8th Memorial Rik Van Steenbergen
9th Overall Étoile de Bessèges
9th Nokere Koerse
10th Kuurne–Brussels–Kuurne
2009
3rd Grote Prijs Jef Scherens
6th Omloop Het Nieuwsblad
6th Paris–Brussels
2010
1st Dwars door het Hageland
3rd Antwerpse Havenpijl
4th Overall Three Days of De Panne
7th Ronde van Drenthe
2011
1st De Vlaamse Pijl
3rd Kattekoers
7th Classic Loire Atlantique
8th Trofeo Laigueglia
10th Nokere Koerse
2012
1st De Vlaamse Pijl
1st Grote Prijs Jean-Pierre Monseré
3rd Grote Prijs Jef Scherens
9th Overall Tour of Hainan
2013
1st Mountains classification Tour de l'Eurometropole
2nd Overall Tour of Hainan
4th Heistse Pijl
7th Ruddervoorde Koerse
8th Gullegem Koerse
9th Kustpijl
10th Grote Prijs Wase Polders
2014
10th La Roue Tourangelle
