= Dwars door de Antwerpse Kempen =

Race details
- Date: August
- Region: Belgium
- Discipline: Road
- Competition: UCI Europe Tour
- Type: Single-day race

History
- First edition: 2010
- Editions: 2 (as of 2011)
- First winner: Aidis Kruopis (LTU)
- Most recent: Tom De Vriendt (BEL)

The Dwars door de Antwerpse Kempen is a European cycling race held in Belgium, departing from Mol and arriving at Maria-ter-Heide. Since 2010, the race has been organised as a 1.2 event on the UCI Europe Tour.

== Winners ==
Year	Country	Rider	Team
2010	Lithuania	Aidis Kruopis	Palmans Cras
2011	Belgium	Tom Devriendt	EFC-Quick Step Cycling Team
