= Aidis Kruopis =

Lithuanian cyclist

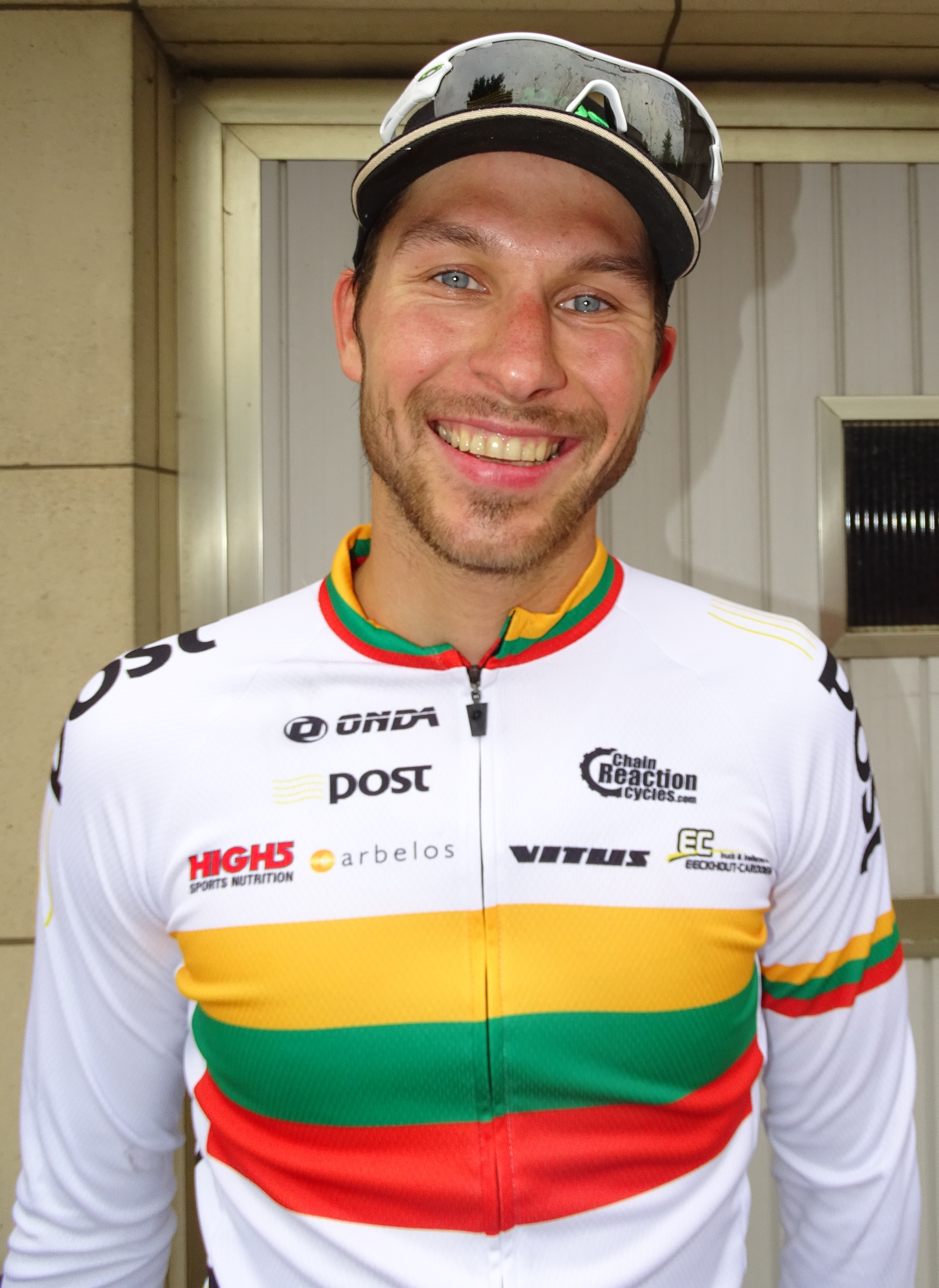
- Kruopis at the 2015 Antwerpse Havenpijl

Personal information
- Full name: Aidis Kruopis
- Born: 26 October 1986 (age 39) Lithuania
- Height: 1.84 m (6 ft 0 in)
- Weight: 80 kg (176 lb)

Cycling career
- Sport: Cycling
- Current team: Retired
- Discipline: Road
- Role: Rider
- Rider type: Sprinter

Amateur teams
- 2007: Klaipeda–Splendid Cyclingteam
- 2008: Ulan

Professional teams
- 2009: Team Piemonte
- 2010: Palmans–Cras
- 2011: Landbouwkrediet
- 2012–2014: GreenEDGE
- 2015: An Post–Chain Reaction
- 2016–2018: Verandas Willems

Major wins
- One-Day Races and Classics National Road Race Championship (2015)

Aidis Kruopis (born 26 October 1986) is a Lithuanian former professional road cyclist.

== Major results ==
2005
3rd Team pursuit, UEC European Under-23 Track Championships
2006
3rd Team pursuit, UEC European Under-23 Track Championships
8th Overall Olympia's Tour
2007
2nd Antwerpse Havenpijl
5th Riga Grand Prix
5th Grote Prijs Stad Zottegem
2008
2nd Overall Dookoła Mazowsza
4th Overall Five Rings of Moscow
4th Paris–Mantes-en-Yvelines
5th Tartu GP
2010
1st Dwars door de Antwerpse Kempen
1st Schaal Sels
2nd Kampioenschap van Vlaanderen
3rd Road race, National Road Championships
4th Münsterland Giro
8th Overall Delta Tour Zeeland
9th Antwerpse Havenpijl
9th Dwars door Drenthe
10th Grote Prijs Jef Scherens
2011
1st Grote 1-MeiPrijs
1st Schaal Sels
1st Omloop van het Waasland
1st Stage 2 Tour of Belgium
3rd Grand Prix de Denain
4th Dwars door de Antwerpse Kempen
5th Handzame Classic
5th Beverbeek Classic
5th Rund um Köln
5th Memorial Rik Van Steenbergen
8th Overall Ronde van Drenthe
10th Omloop van het Houtland
2012
Tour du Poitou-Charentes

1st Points classification
1st Stages 1 & 2

1st Stage 3 Tour of Norway
1st Stage 4 Tour de Pologne
1st Stage 2 (TTT) Eneco Tour
2nd Road race, National Road Championships
7th Overall Tour de l'Eurométropole
9th Overall Tour of Qatar
2013
1st Stage 2 Tour of Turkey
2nd Grote Prijs Wase Polders
2014
1st Sprints classification Tour de Langkawi
2015
1st Road race, National Road Championships
1st Antwerpse Havenpijl
5th Halle–Ingooigem
7th Ronde van Overijssel
9th Overall Rás Tailteann

1st Mountains classification
1st Stages 4 & 8

9th Ronde van Noord-Holland
10th Overall Ronde de l'Oise
2016
1st Overall Paris–Arras Tour

1st Stages 1 & 2

1st Dorpenomloop Rucphen
1st Gooikse Pijl
1st Ronde van Overijssel
3rd Heistse Pijl
2017
10th Grote Prijs Stad Zottegem
