= De Vlaamse Pijl =

Cycling race in Belgium

Race details
- Date: Early-March
- Region: Harelbeke, Belgium
- English name: Flemish Arrow
- Local name(s): Flèche flamande (in French)
- Discipline: Road race
- Competition: UCI Europe Tour (as part of the Driedaagse van West-Vlaanderen)
- Type: Single-day
- Web site: www.devlaamsepijl.be

History
- First edition: 1968
- Editions: 48 (as of 2016)
- First winner: Julien Vermote (BEL)
- Most wins: Julien Vermote (BEL); Eddy Planckaert (BEL); Patrick Hendrickx (BEL); Jurgen Vermeersch (BEL); Frédéric Amorison (BEL) (2 wins)
- Most recent: Dylan Groenewegen (NED)

De Vlaamse Pijl (English: Flemish Arrow) is a Belgian road bicycle race held annually since 1968. The race starts and ends in Harelbeke. From 2005 until 2012, it was rated as a 1.2 event on the UCI Europe Tour, however in 2013 the race was no longer held separately but became part of the Driedaagse van West-Vlaanderen stage race.

== Winners ==
Year	Country	Rider	Team
1968	Belgium	Julien Vermote	
1969	Belgium	Eric Vermeeren	
1970	Belgium	Julien Vermote	
1971	Belgium	José Van Ackere	
1972	Belgium	Luc Demets	
1973	Netherlands	Wim De Waal	
1974	Belgium	Daniel D'Hooghe	
1975	Belgium	Emiel Vergote	
1976	Netherlands	Peter Gödde	
1977	Belgium	Johnny Denul	
1978	Belgium	Eddy Planckaert	
1979	Belgium	Eddy Planckaert	
1980	Netherlands	Mario Van Vlimmeren	
1981	Belgium	René De Brucker	
1982	Belgium	Rudy Declerck	
1983	Belgium	Luc Meersman	
1984	Belgium	Ronny Westelinck	
1985	Belgium	Patrick Hendrickx	
1986	Belgium	Guy Rooms	
1987	Netherlands	Adrie Kools	
1988	Belgium	Patrick Hendrickx	
1989	Belgium	Eric De Clercq	
1990	Belgium	Hans De Clercq	
1991	Belgium	Pascal Desmul	
1992	Netherlands	Gino Bos	
1993	Belgium	Andy De Smet	
1994	Belgium	Giovanni Cornette	
1995	Belgium	Patrick Roelandt	
1996	Belgium	Fabien De Waele	
1997	Netherlands	Karsten Kroon	
1998	Belgium	Geoffrey Demeyere	
1999	Belgium	Luc De Duytsche	
2000	Belgium	Tim Meeusen	
2001	Belgium	Stijn Devolder	
2002	Belgium	Bart Dockx	Domo-Sweet Paradise
2003	Belgium	Jurgen Vermeersch	Cerdi Team
2004	Belgium	Jurgen Vermeersch	Cerdi Team Ingelmunster
2005	No race		
2006	Belgium	Evert Verbist	Chocolade Jacques–Topsport Vlaanderen
2007	Belgium	Jelle Vanendert	Chocolade Jacques–Topsport Vlaanderen
2008	Netherlands	Bram Schmitz	Van Vliet-EBH Elshof
2009	Belgium	Jan Ghyselinck	Beveren 2000
2010	New Zealand	Clinton Avery	PWS Eijssen
2011	Belgium	Frédéric Amorison	Landbouwkrediet
2012	Belgium	Frédéric Amorison	Landbouwkrediet–Euphony
2013	Italy	Danilo Napolitano	Accent Jobs–Wanty
2014	Netherlands	Danny van Poppel	Trek Factory Racing
2015	Belgium	Yves Lampaert	Etixx–Quick-Step
2016	Netherlands	Dylan Groenewegen	LottoNL–Jumbo
