= Landbouwkrediet–Colnago =

Belgian professional cycling team

Crelan–Euphony

Team information
- UCI code: CRE
- Registered: Belgium
- Founded: 1992
- Disbanded: 2013
- Discipline: Road
- Status: UCI Professional Continental
- Bicycles: Colnago
- Website: Team home page

Key personnel
- General manager: Gérard Bulens

Team name history
- 1992 1993 1994 1995–1996 1997–2000 2001–2006 2007–2008 2009 2010–2011 2012 2013: Saxon (SAX); Saxon–Breitex (SAX); Saxon–Selle Italia (SAX); Tönissteiner–Saxon (TON); Tönissteiner–Colnago (TON); Landbouwkrediet–Colnago (LAN); Landbouwkrediet–Tönissteiner (LAN); Landbouwkrediet–Colnago (LAN); Landbouwkrediet (LAN); Landbouwkrediet-Euphony (LAN); Crelan–Euphony (CRE)
Landbouwkrediet–Colnago jersey
Jersey

Crelan–Euphony (UCI team code: CRE) was a UCI Professional Continental cycling team based in Belgium that participated in UCI Continental Circuits races and when selected as a wildcard to UCI ProTour events. The team was managed by Gérard Bulens, with assistance from directeur sportifs Jef De Bilde, Claude Criquielion, Marco Saligari and Claude Van Collie.

Despite the fact that it was never a top team, they had a 3rd place in the GC of the 2003 Giro d'Italia, thanks to later Discovery Channel and Astana rider Yaroslav Popovych.

The team was sponsored by the Belgian companies Crelan, a bank, and Euphony, a telecommunications company.

The team folded at the end of the 2013 season, for financial reasons.

== Final team roster ==
As of 1 January 2013.

Rider	Date of birth
Frédéric Amorison (BEL)	16 February 1978 (aged 34)
Vincent Baestaens (BEL)	18 June 1989 (aged 23)
Koen Barbé (BEL)	20 January 1981 (aged 31)
Jonathan Breyne (BEL)	4 January 1991 (aged 21)
Joeri Bueken (BEL)	1 March 1991 (aged 21)
Kevin Claeys (BEL)	26 March 1988 (aged 24)
Sébastien Delfosse (BEL)	29 November 1982 (aged 30)
Gilles Devillers (BEL)	12 February 1985 (aged 27)
Reinier Honig (NED)	28 October 1983 (aged 29)
Kurt Hovelynck (BEL)	2 June 1981 (aged 31)
Egidijus Juodvalkis (LTU)	8 April 1988 (aged 24)

Rider	Date of birth
Sven Nys (BEL)	17 June 1976 (aged 36)
Kevin Peeters (BEL)	5 February 1987 (aged 25)
Baptiste Planckaert (BEL)	28 September 1988 (aged 24)
Christophe Prémont (BEL)	22 November 1989 (aged 23)
Joeri Stallaert (BEL)	25 January 1991 (aged 21)
Stijn Steels (BEL)	21 August 1989 (aged 23)
Klaas Sys (BEL)	30 November 1986 (aged 26)
Pieter Van Herck (BEL)	8 September 1991 (aged 21)
Sven Vanthourenhout (BEL)	14 January 1981 (aged 31)
Maxime Vantomme (BEL)	8 March 1986 (aged 26)

== Major wins ==
1993
Stage 6a Herald Sun Tour, Jocelyn Jolidon
Stage 7 Herald Sun Tour, Jacques Jolidon
1994
Rund um Düren, Rik Claeys
1995
1996
Stage 3 Tour de Picardie, Marc Streel
Flèche Hesbignonne, Marc Streel
Stage 2 Circuit Franco-Belge, Marc Streel
Tour de Okinawa, Ken Hashikawa
1997
Grote Prijs Jef Scherens, Stéphane Hennebert
Stage 5 Rás Tailteann, Michael Fitzgerald
Zellik–Galmaarden, Ludo Dierckxsens
Grand Prix de Denain, Ludo Dierckxsens
1998
Stage 4 Vuelta a La Rioja, Jan Hordijk
Stage 5a Commonwealth Bank Classic, Jan Hordijk
Prix d'Armor, Hans De Meester
1999
Stage 1b OZ Wielerweekend, Bert Roesems
Stage 3a Circuit Franco-Belge, Bert Roesems
Overall Tour de la Somme, Bert Roesems

Stage 1b, Bert Roesems

Kampioenschap van Vlaanderen, Michel Van Haecke
2000
Cras Avernas, Michel Van Haecke
Stage 3a Tour de la Somme, Michel Van Haecke
Dwars door Gendringen, Kees Hopmans
Grote Prijs Stad Zottegem, Michel Van Haecke
Druivenkoers Overijse, Michel Van Haecke
2001
Nokere Koerse, Michel Van Haecke
Archer GP, Gordon McCauley
Antwerpse Havenpijl, Michel Van Haecke
GP Stadsbelangen Sint-Niklaas, Jurgen Vermeersch
Stage 2b Tour de la Somme, Bert Roesems
Stage 5 Tour de Wallonie, Bert Roesems
New Zealand Road Race Championship, Gordon McCauley
2002
Gran Premio della Costa Etruschi, Yuri Metlushenko
Poreč Trophy I, Volodymyr Bileka
Poreč Trophy II, Yaroslav Popovych
GP de Genève, Yaroslav Popovych
Stage 4 Tour of South China Sea, Glen Chadwick
2003
GP d'Ouverture, Ludo Dierckxsens
Stage 3 Étoile de Bessèges, Tom Steels
Scheldeprijs Vlaanderen, Ludovic Capelle
Stage 1 Tour of Belgium, Tom Steels
Stage 7 Tour of Austria, Tom Steels
Lithuania, Time Trial Championship, Tomas Vaitkus
Tour du Doubs, Bert De Waele
Stage 4 Regio Tour, Vladimir Duma
Stage 2 Danmark Rundt, Yuri Metlushenko
Stage 4 Danmark Rundt, Tomas Vaitkus
Stage 1 Tour du Poitou Charentes, Yuri Metlushenko
2004
Stage 1 Étoile de Bessèges, Tom Steels
Gran Premio della Costa Etruschi, Yuri Metlushenko
GP Cholet-Pays de Loire, Bert De Waele
Dwars door Vlaanderen, Ludovic Capelle
Grand Prix Pino Cerami, Nico Sijmens
Stage 2 Four Days of Dunkirk, Marc Streel
Overall Tour du Luxembourg, Maxime Monfort

Stage 2, Tom Steels
Stage 3, Maxime Monfort

Stage 1 & 3 Tour of Austria, Tom Steels
Stage 7 Tour of Austria, Ludo Dierckxsens
Lithuania, Road Race Championship, Tomas Vaitkus
Lithuania, Time Trial Championship, Tomas Vaitkus
Uzbekistan, Time Trial Championship, Sergey Lagutin
(Belgium) Belgian, Road Race Championship, Tom Steels
Stage 2b Brixia Tour, Yuri Metlushenko
Stage 5 Danmark Rundt, Tomas Vaitkus
Stage 5 Tour du Poitou Charentes, Ludovic Capelle
Grand Prix d'Isbergues, Ludovic Capelle
Omloop van het Houtland, Bert De Waele
2005
Hel van het Mergelland, Nico Sijmens
Stage 3a Tour of Belgium, Jurgen Van Loocke
Flèche Hesbignonne, Geert Verheyen
Uzbekistan, Time Trial Championship, Sergey Lagutin
Uzbekistan, Road Race Championship, Sergey Lagutin
Overall Regio-Tour, Nico Sijmens

Stage 2, Nico Sijmens

Kampioenschap van Vlaanderen, Sergey Lagutin
2006

Stage 3, Nico Sijmens

2007
Beverbeek Classic, Nico Sijmens
Hel van het Mergelland, Nico Sijmens
Drie Zustersteden - Willebroek, Bert De Waele
Sparkassen Giro Bochum, Andy Cappelle
Stage 3 Regio Tour, Andy Cappelle
Stage 6 Tour of Britain, Paul Manning
Grand Prix de Wallonie, Bert De Waele
2008
Stage 1 Étoile de Bessèges, Jan Kuyckx
2009
1 Meiprijs, Denis Flahaut
Stage 4 Tour of Belgium, Bert De Waele
Nationale Sluitingsprijs, Denis Flahaut
2010
Dwars door het Hageland, Frédéric Amorison
2011
De Vlaamse Pijl, Frédéric Amorison
Omloop van het Waasland, Aidis Kruopis
Grand Prix Pino Cerami, Bert Scheirlinckx
1 Meiprijs, Aidis Kruopis
Stage 1 Tour de Picardie, Egidijus Juodvalkis
Stage 2 Tour of Belgium, Aidis Kruopis
I.W.T. Jong Maar Moedig, Bert Scheirlinckx
Stage 2 Paris–Corrèze, Bert De Waele
Schaal Sels, Aidis Kruopis
2012
Finland, Time Trial Championship, Matti Helminen
De Vlaamse Pijl, Frédéric Amorison
Ronde van Limburg (Belgium), Kevin Claeys
Grote Prijs Jean-Pierre Monseré, Frédéric Amorison
Antwerpse Havenpijl, Joeri Stallaert
Kustpijl, Kevin Claeys
2013
Circuit de Wallonie, Sébastien Delfosse
Rund um Köln, Sébastien Delfosse
Kustpijl, Egidijus Juodvalkis
Stage 8 Tour of Taihu Lake, Jonathan Breyne

== World and national champions ==
2001
New Zealand Road Race Championship, Gordon McCauley
2003
Lithuania Time Trial Championship, Tomas Vaitkus
2004
Lithuania, Road Race Championship, Tomas Vaitkus
Lithuania, Time Trial Championship, Tomas Vaitkus
Uzbekistan Time Trial Championship, Sergey Lagutin
Belgian Road Race Championship, Tom Steels
2005
Uzbekistan Time Trial Championship, Sergey Lagutin
Uzbekistan Road Race Championship, Sergey Lagutin
2009
Belgian Cyclo-cross Championship, Sven Nys
2010
Belgian Cyclo-cross Championship, Sven Nys
2012
Belgian Cyclo-cross Championship, Sven Nys
Time Trial Championship, Matti Helminen
2013
World Cyclo-cross Championship, Sven Nys
