= Donckers Koffie–Jelly Belly =

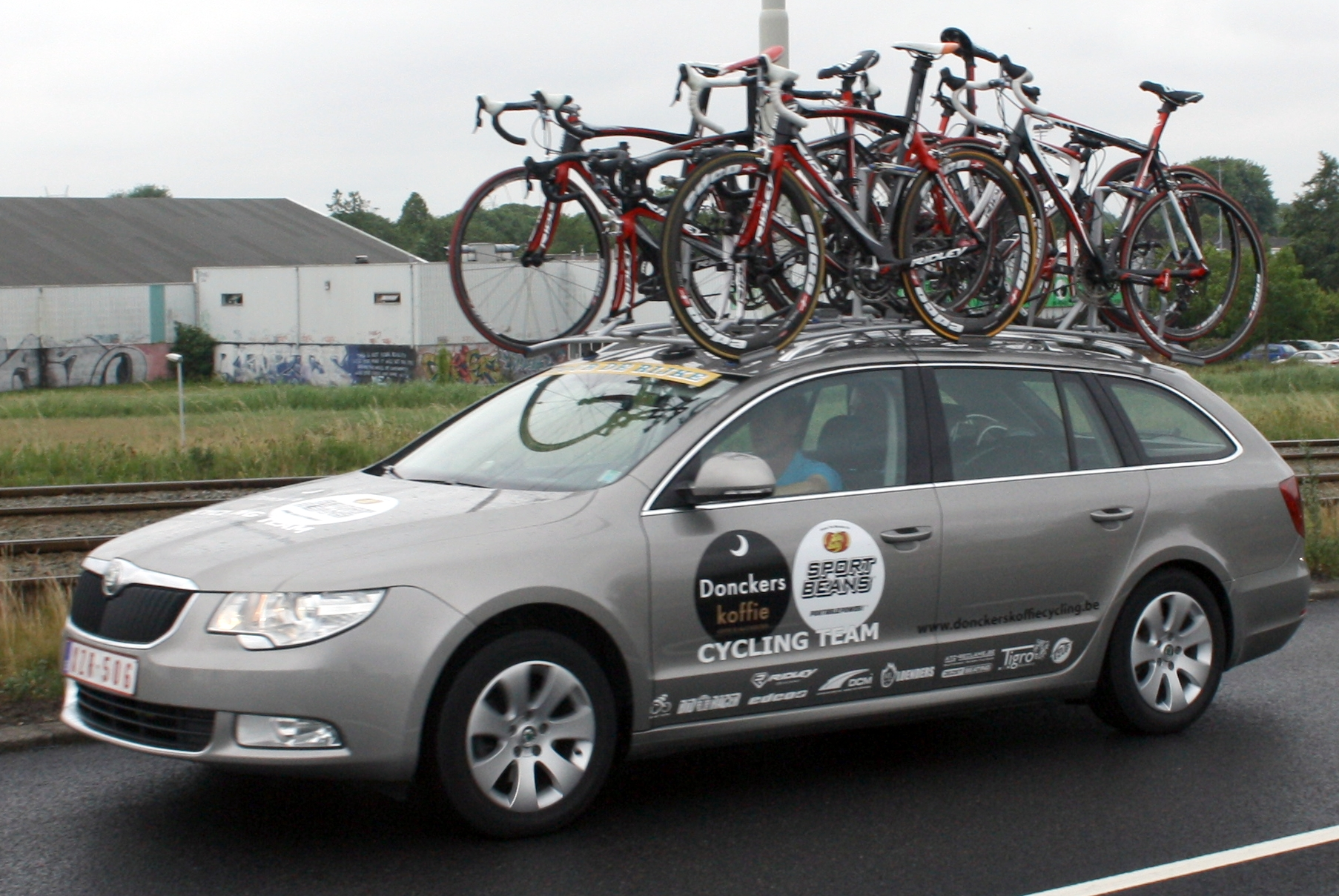
- Team car in 2011

Team information
- UCI code: QCT
- Registered: Belgium
- Founded: 2010
- Disbanded: 2011
- Discipline: Road

Team name history
- 2010 2011: Qin Cycling Team; Donckers Koffie–Jelly Belly

Donckers Koffie–Jelly Belly was a Belgian UCI Continental cycling team that competed from 2010 to 2011.

== Major results ==
2010
Grote 1-MeiPrijs, Jan Kuyckx
2011
Handzame Classic, Steve Schets
