= Grand Prix Pino Cerami =

Bicycle road race in Hainaut, Belgium

Race details
- Date: Early-April
- Region: Hainaut, Belgium
- English name: Grand Prix Pino Cerami
- Local name: Grand Prix Pino Cerami (in French)
- Discipline: Road race
- Competition: UCI Europe Tour
- Type: Single-day
- Web site: www.grandprixcerami.be

History
- First edition: 1964
- Editions: 57 (as of 2026)
- First winner: André Noyelle (BEL)
- Most wins: Gerrie Knetemann (NED); Joop Zoetemelk (NED); Marco Serpellini (ITA) (2 wins)
- Most recent: Cériel Desal (BEL)

Grand Prix Pino Cerami is a single-day road bicycle race held annually in April in Hainaut, Belgium. From 2005 to 2019, the race was organized as a 1.1 event on the UCI Europe Tour, before being cancelled from 2019 to 2022. Upon its return in 2023, it downgraded to 1.2 status. Giuseppe 'Pino' Cerami, after whom the race is named, is a former Belgian road bicycle racer. He first raced in the professional peloton in 1946, and was naturalized a Belgian in 1956.

== Winners ==
Year	Country	Rider	Team
1964	Belgium	André Noyelle	Labo–Dr. Mann
1965	Belgium	Jan Boonen	Flandria–Romeo
1966	Belgium	Eddy Merckx	Peugeot–BP–Michelin
1967	Belgium	Willy Planckaert	Romeo–Smith's
1968	Belgium	Julien Stevens	Smith's
1969	Belgium	Frans Mintjens	Faema
1970	Belgium	André Dierickx	Flandria–Mars
1971	Belgium	Georges van Coningsloo	Molteni
1972	Belgium	Christian Callens	Novy–Dubble Bubble
1973	Belgium	Ferdinand Bracke	Peugeot–BP–Michelin
1974	Belgium	Marc Demeyer	Carpenter–Confortluxe–Flandria
1975	Belgium	Eddy Verstraeten	Maes Pils-Watney
1976	Belgium	Willy Teirlinck	Gitane–Campagnolo
1977	Belgium	Jozef Jacobs	IJsboerke–Colnago
1978	Netherlands	Gerrie Knetemann	TI–Raleigh
1979	Belgium	Daniel Verplancke	Flandria–Ca-Va Seul–Sunair
1980	Netherlands	Joop Zoetemelk	TI–Raleigh
1981	Netherlands	Joop Zoetemelk	TI–Raleigh
1982	Belgium	Ronny van Holen	Safir–Marc
1983	France	Bernard Hinault	Renault–Elf
1984	Netherlands	Gerrie Knetemann	Europ Decor–Boule d'Or
1985	Belgium	Paul Haghedooren	Lotto
1986	Switzerland	Urs Freuler	Atala–Ofmega
1987	Denmark	Rolf Sørensen	Remac–Fanini
1988	Netherlands	John Talen	Panasonic–Isostar
1989	Switzerland	Stephan Joho	Ariostea
1990	Italy	Maximillian Sciandri	Carrera-Vagabond
1991	Soviet Union	Andrej Tchmil	S.E.F.B.–Saxon-Gan
1992	Switzerland	Laurent Dufaux	Helvetia
1994	Italy	Michele Bartoli	Mercatone Uno–Medeghini
1995	Italy	Fabiano Fontanelli	ZG Mobili–Selle Italia
1996	Italy	Marco Serpellini	Panaria–Vinavil
1998	Italy	Marco Serpellini	Brescialat–Liquigas
1999	Italy	Fabrizio Guidi	Team Polti
2000	Germany	Jan Bratkowski	Mercury Cycling Team
2001	Australia	Scott Sunderland	Team Fakta
2002	United States	Kirk O'Bee	Navigators Insurance Cycling Team
2003	Netherlands	Bart Voskamp	BankGiroLoterij
2004	Belgium	Nico Sijmens	Landbouwkrediet–Colnago
2005	Netherlands	Kai Reus	Rabobank Continental Team
2006	Netherlands	Sebastian Langeveld	Skil–Shimano
2007	Italy	Luca Solari	Team LPR
2008	Switzerland	Patrick Calcagni	Barloworld
2009	No race		
2010	Slovenia	Jure Kocjan	Carmiooro NGC
2011	Belgium	Bert Scheirlinckx	Landbouwkrediet
2012	Belgium	Gaëtan Bille	Lotto–Belisol
2013	Belgium	Jonas Vangenechten	Lotto–Belisol
2014	Italy	Alessandro Petacchi	Omega Pharma–Quick-Step
2015	Belgium	Philippe Gilbert	BMC Racing Team
2016	Belgium	Jelle Wallays	Lotto–Soudal
2017	Belgium	Wout van Aert	Vérandas Willems–Crelan
2018	Great Britain	Peter Kennaugh	Bora–Hansgrohe
2019	France	Bryan Coquard	Vital Concept–B&B Hotels
2020–2022	No race		
2023	New Zealand	James Fouché	Bolton Equities Black Spoke
2024	Belgium	Sente Sentjens	Alpecin–Deceuninck
2025	Germany	Tobias Müller	Wanty–Nippo–ReUz
2026	Belgium	Cériel Desal	Soudal–Quick-Step Devo Team
