= 2013 Tour de Wallonie =

2013 UCI Europe Tour

Race details
- Dates: 20–24 July 2013
- Stages: 5
- Distance: 884.9 km (549.9 mi)
- Winning time: 22h 08' 02"

Results
Jersey awarded to the overall winner	Winner	Greg Van Avermaet (BEL)	(BMC Racing Team)
	Second	Anthony Geslin (FRA)	(FDJ.fr)
	Third	Alexandr Kolobnev (RUS)	(Team Katusha)
Jersey awarded to the points classification winner	Points	Greg Van Avermaet (BEL)	(BMC Racing Team)
Jersey awarded to the mountains classification winner	Mountains	Tiago Machado (POR)	(RadioShack–Leopard)
Jersey awarded to the youth classification winner	Youth	Olivier Chevalier (BEL)	(Wallonie-Bruxelles)
Jersey awarded to the sprints classification winner	Sprints	Stijn Steels (BEL)	(Crelan–Euphony)
	Combativity	Christophe Prémont (BEL)	(Crelan–Euphony)
	Team	FDJ.fr	

The 2013 Tour de Wallonie was the 40th edition of the Tour de Wallonie cycle race and was held on 20–24 July 2013. The race started in Ans and finished in Thuin. The race was won by Greg Van Avermaet.

== Teams ==
Seventeen teams competed at the 2013 Tour de Wallonie. These included ten UCI ProTeams, five UCI Professional Continental Teams, and two UCI Continental Teams.

UCI ProTeams

- Ag2r–La Mondiale
- Belkin Pro Cycling
- BMC Racing Team
- FDJ.fr
- Garmin–Sharp
- Lotto–Belisol
- Omega Pharma–Quick-Step
- Team Katusha
- RadioShack–Leopard
- Vacansoleil–DCM

UCI Professional Continental Teams

- Accent Jobs–Wanty
- Crelan–Euphony
- Topsport Vlaanderen–Baloise
- Cofidis
- Team Europcar

UCI Continental Teams

- Color Code–Biowanze
- Wallonie-Bruxelles

== Route ==
Stage characteristics and winners
Stage	Date	Course	Distance	Type	Winner
1	20 July	Ans to Eupen	183.6 km (114 mi)	Hilly stage	Alexandr Kolobnev (RUS)
2	21 July	Verviers to Engis	174.4 km (108 mi)	Flat stage	Tom Boonen (BEL)
3	22 July	Beaufays to Bastogne	168.5 km (105 mi)	Hilly stage	Greg Van Avermaet (BEL)
4	23 July	Andenne to Clabecq	197.1 km (122 mi)	Flat stage	Kenny Dehaes (BEL)
5	24 July	Soignies to Thuin	144.7 km (90 mi)	Hilly stage	Greg Van Avermaet (BEL)

== Stages ==
=== Stage 1 ===
20 July 2013 – Ans to Eupen, 183.6 km (114 mi)

Stage 1 result
Rank	Rider	Team	Time
1	Alexander Kolobnev (RUS)	Team Katusha	5h 04' 21"
2	Anthony Geslin (FRA)	FDJ.fr	+ 01"
3	Julien Bérard (FRA)	Ag2r–La Mondiale	+ 03"
4	Stijn Devolder (BEL)	RadioShack–Leopard	+ 07"
5	Björn Thurau (GER)	Team Europcar	+ 17"
6	Paul Martens (GER)	Belkin Pro Cycling	+ 24"
7	Daniel Oss (ITA)	BMC Racing Team	+ 24"
8	Greg Van Avermaet (BEL)	BMC Racing Team	+ 24"
9	Marco Marcato (ITA)	Vacansoleil–DCM	+ 24"
10	Anthony Roux (FRA)	FDJ.fr	+ 24"

General classification after stage 1
Rank	Rider	Team	Time
1	Alexander Kolobnev (RUS)	Team Katusha	5h 04' 11"
2	Anthony Geslin (FRA)	FDJ.fr	+ 05"
3	Julien Bérard (FRA)	Ag2r–La Mondiale	+ 08"
4	Stijn Devolder (BEL)	RadioShack–Leopard	+ 17"
5	Björn Thurau (GER)	Team Europcar	+ 27"
6	Greg Van Avermaet (BEL)	BMC Racing Team	+ 31"
7	Marco Marcato (ITA)	Vacansoleil–DCM	+ 32"
8	Paul Martens (GER)	Belkin Pro Cycling	+ 34"
9	Daniel Oss (ITA)	BMC Racing Team	+ 34"
10	Anthony Roux (FRA)	FDJ.fr	+ 34"

=== Stage 2 ===
21 July 2013 – Verviers to Engis, 174.4 km (108 mi)

Stage 2 result
Rank	Rider	Team	Time
1	Tom Boonen (BEL)	Omega Pharma–Quick-Step	4h 23' 33"
2	Tyler Farrar (USA)	Garmin–Sharp	+ 00"
3	Michael Van Staeyen (BEL)	Topsport Vlaanderen–Baloise	+ 00"
4	Romain Feillu (FRA)	Vacansoleil–DCM	+ 00"
5	Danilo Napolitano (ITA)	Accent Jobs–Wanty	+ 00"
6	Antoine Demoitié (BEL)	Wallonie-Bruxelles	+ 00"
7	Jetse Bol (NED)	Belkin Pro Cycling	+ 00"
8	Giacomo Nizzolo (ITA)	RadioShack–Leopard	+ 00"
9	Jonas van Genechten (BEL)	Lotto–Belisol	+ 00"
10	Alexander Porsev (RUS)	Team Katusha	+ 00"

General classification after stage 2
Rank	Rider	Team	Time
1	Alexander Kolobnev (RUS)	Team Katusha	9h 27' 43"
2	Anthony Geslin (FRA)	FDJ.fr	+ 06"
3	Julien Bérard (FRA)	Ag2r–La Mondiale	+ 09"
4	Stijn Devolder (BEL)	RadioShack–Leopard	+ 18"
5	Björn Thurau (GER)	Team Europcar	+ 28"
6	Laurent Mangel (FRA)	FDJ.fr	+ 29"
7	Tim Wellens (BEL)	Lotto–Belisol	+ 31"
8	Greg Van Avermaet (BEL)	BMC Racing Team	+ 32"
9	Marco Marcato (ITA)	Vacansoleil–DCM	+ 33"
10	Tiago Machado (POR)	RadioShack–Leopard	+ 33"

=== Stage 3 ===
22 July 2013 – Beaufays to Bastogne, 174.4 km (108 mi)

Stage 3 result
Rank	Rider	Team	Time
1	Greg Van Avermaet (BEL)	BMC Racing Team	4h 14' 53"
2	Tom Van Asbroeck (BEL)	Topsport Vlaanderen–Baloise	+ 00"
3	Jempy Drucker (LUX)	Accent Jobs–Wanty	+ 00"
4	Daniel Oss (ITA)	BMC Racing Team	+ 00"
5	Paul Martens (GER)	Belkin Pro Cycling	+ 00"
6	Maxime Vantomme (BEL)	Crelan–Euphony	+ 00"
7	Romain Feillu (FRA)	Vacansoleil–DCM	+ 00"
8	Anthony Roux (FRA)	FDJ.fr	+ 00"
9	Nico Sijmens (BEL)	Cofidis	+ 00"
10	Michel Kreder (NED)	Garmin–Sharp	+ 00"

General classification after stage 3
Rank	Rider	Team	Time
1	Alexander Kolobnev (RUS)	Team Katusha	13h 42' 36"
2	Anthony Geslin (FRA)	FDJ.fr	+ 06"
3	Stijn Devolder (BEL)	RadioShack–Leopard	+ 18"
4	Greg Van Avermaet (BEL)	BMC Racing Team	+ 22"
5	Björn Thurau (GER)	Team Europcar	+ 28"
6	Jempy Drucker (LUX)	Accent Jobs–Wanty	+ 31"
7	Tim Wellens (BEL)	Lotto–Belisol	+ 31"
8	Laurens De Vreese (BEL)	Topsport Vlaanderen–Baloise	+ 32"
9	Marco Marcato (ITA)	Vacansoleil–DCM	+ 33"
10	Tiago Machado (POR)	RadioShack–Leopard	+ 33"

=== Stage 4 ===
23 July 2013 – Andenne to Clabecq, 197.1 km (122 mi)

Stage 4 result
Rank	Rider	Team	Time
1	Kenny Dehaes (BEL)	Lotto–Belisol	4h 57' 15"
2	Giacomo Nizzolo (ITA)	RadioShack–Leopard	+ 00"
3	Danilo Napolitano (ITA)	Accent Jobs–Wanty	+ 00"
4	Raymond Kreder (NED)	Garmin–Sharp	+ 00"
5	Romain Feillu (FRA)	Vacansoleil–DCM	+ 00"
6	Davide Appollonio (ITA)	Ag2r–La Mondiale	+ 00"
7	Michael Van Staeyen (BEL)	Topsport Vlaanderen–Baloise	+ 00"
8	Luca Paolini (ITA)	Team Katusha	+ 00"
9	Olivier Chevalier (BEL)	Wallonie-Bruxelles	+ 00"
10	Nico Sijmens (BEL)	Cofidis	+ 00"

General classification after stage 4
Rank	Rider	Team	Time
1	Alexander Kolobnev (RUS)	Team Katusha	18h 39' 51"
2	Anthony Geslin (FRA)	FDJ.fr	+ 06"
3	Greg Van Avermaet (BEL)	BMC Racing Team	+ 22"
4	Björn Thurau (GER)	Team Europcar	+ 28"
5	Jempy Drucker (LUX)	Accent Jobs–Wanty	+ 31"
6	Tim Wellens (BEL)	Lotto–Belisol	+ 31"
7	Laurens De Vreese (BEL)	Topsport Vlaanderen–Baloise	+ 32"
8	Jan Ghyselinck (BEL)	Cofidis	+ 32"
9	Marco Marcato (ITA)	Vacansoleil–DCM	+ 33"
10	Tiago Machado (POR)	RadioShack–Leopard	+ 33"

=== Stage 5 ===
24 July 2013 – Soignies to Thuin, 144.7 km (90 mi)

Stage 5 result
Rank	Rider	Team	Time
1	Greg Van Avermaet (BEL)	Lotto–Belisol	3h 27' 59"
2	Daniel Oss (ITA)	BMC Racing Team	+ 03"
3	Marco Marcato (ITA)	Vacansoleil–DCM	+ 03"
4	Olivier Chevalier (BEL)	Wallonie-Bruxelles	+ 03"
5	Jempy Drucker (LUX)	Accent Jobs–Wanty	+ 07"
6	Paul Martens (GER)	Belkin Pro Cycling	+ 07"
7	Tim Wellens (BEL)	Lotto–Belisol	+ 07"
8	Laurent Évrard (BEL)	Wallonie-Bruxelles	+ 07"
9	Dries Devenyns (BEL)	Omega Pharma–Quick-Step	+ 07"
10	Maxime Vantomme (BEL)	Crelan–Euphony	+ 11"

General classification after stage 5
Rank	Rider	Team	Time
1	Greg Van Avermaet (BEL)	BMC Racing Team	22h 08' 02"
2	Anthony Geslin (FRA)	FDJ.fr	+ 10"
3	Alexander Kolobnev (RUS)	Team Katusha	+ 12"
4	Daniel Oss (ITA)	BMC Racing Team	+ 20"
5	Marco Marcato (ITA)	Vacansoleil–DCM	+ 20"
6	Jempy Drucker (LUX)	Accent Jobs–Wanty	+ 26"
7	Olivier Chevalier (BEL)	Wallonie-Bruxelles	+ 26"
8	Tim Wellens (BEL)	Lotto–Belisol	+ 26"
9	Paul Martens (GER)	Belkin Pro Cycling	+ 30"
10	Laurent Évrard (BEL)	Wallonie-Bruxelles	+ 30"

== Classification Leadership ==
Stage	Winner	General classification	Points classification	Mountains classification	Young rider classification	Sprints classification	Combativity classification	Teams classification
1	Alexander Kolobnev	Alexander Kolobnev	Alexander Kolobnev (Note: On stage 2, Anthony Geslin, who was second in the points classification, wore the points jersey because Alexander Kolobnev wore the general classification leader's jersey. Tom Boonen wore the points jersey on stage 3 for the same reason.)	Tiago Machado	Laurent Évrard	Laurent Mangel	Boris Dron	FDJ.fr
2	Tom Boonen	Alexander Kolobnev	Alexander Kolobnev	Tiago Machado	Tim Wellens	Stijn Steels	Boris Dron	FDJ.fr
3	Greg Van Avermaet	Alexander Kolobnev	Greg Van Avermaet	Tiago Machado	Tim Wellens	Stijn Steels	Stijn Steels	FDJ.fr
4	Kenny Dehaes	Alexander Kolobnev	Romain Feillu	Tiago Machado	Tim Wellens	Stijn Steels	Christophe Prémont	FDJ.fr
5	Greg Van Avermaet	Greg Van Avermaet	Greg Van Avermaet	Tiago Machado	Olivier Chevalier	Stijn Steels	Christophe Prémont	FDJ.fr
Final		Greg Van Avermaet	Greg Van Avermaet	Tiago Machado	Olivier Chevalier	Stijn Steels	Christophe Prémont	FDJ.fr

== Final Classification Standings ==
Legend
Denotes the winner of the general classification	Denotes the winner of the points classification
Denotes the winner of the mountains classification	Denotes the winner of the young rider classification
Denotes the winner of the sprints classification	

=== General classification ===
Final general classification (1-10)
Rank	Rider	Team	Time
1	Greg Van Avermaet (BEL)	BMC Racing Team	22h 08' 02"
2	Anthony Geslin (FRA)	FDJ.fr	+ 10"
3	Alexander Kolobnev (RUS)	Team Katusha	+ 12"
4	Daniel Oss (ITA)	BMC Racing Team	+ 20"
5	Marco Marcato (ITA)	Vacansoleil–DCM	+ 20"
6	Jempy Drucker (LUX)	Accent Jobs–Wanty	+ 26"
7	Olivier Chevalier (BEL)	Wallonie-Bruxelles	+ 26"
8	Tim Wellens (BEL)	Lotto–Belisol	+ 26"
9	Paul Martens (GER)	Belkin Pro Cycling	+ 30"
10	Laurent Évrard (BEL)	Wallonie-Bruxelles	+ 30"

=== Points classification ===
Final points classification (1-10)
Rank	Rider	Team	Time
1	Greg Van Avermaet (BEL)	BMC Racing Team	58
2	Daniel Oss (ITA)	BMC Racing Team	43
3	Romain Feillu (FRA)	Vacansoleil–DCM	35
4	Jempy Drucker (LUX)	Accent Jobs–Wanty	33
5	Paul Martens (GER)	Belkin Pro Cycling	32
6	Giacomo Nizzolo (ITA)	RadioShack–Leopard	28
7	Danilo Napolitano (ITA)	Accent Jobs–Wanty	28
8	Marco Marcato (ITA)	Vacansoleil–DCM	26
9	Alexander Kolobnev (RUS)	Team Katusha	25
10	Tom Boonen (BEL)	Omega Pharma–Quick-Step	25

=== Mountains classification ===
Final mountains classification (1-10)
Rank	Rider	Team	Time
1	Tiago Machado (POR)	RadioShack–Leopard	80
2	Tim Wellens (BEL)	Lotto–Belisol	58
3	Ben Gastauer (LUX)	Ag2r–La Mondiale	40
4	Laurent Mangel (FRA)	FDJ.fr	24
5	Marco Marcato (ITA)	Vacansoleil–DCM	18
6	Gilles Devillers (BEL)	Crelan–Euphony	18
7	Greg Van Avermaet (BEL)	BMC Racing Team	14
8	Boris Dron (BEL)	Wallonie-Bruxelles	14
9	Yoann Offredo (FRA)	FDJ.fr	10
10	Jempy Drucker (LUX)	Accent Jobs–Wanty	10

=== Young rider classification ===
Final young rider classification (1-10)
Rank	Rider	Team	Time
1	Olivier Chevalier (BEL)	Wallonie-Bruxelles	22h 08' 28"
2	Tim Wellens (BEL)	Lotto–Belisol	+ 00"
3	Laurent Évrard (BEL)	Wallonie-Bruxelles	+ 04"
4	Tom-Jelte Slagter (NED)	Belkin Pro Cycling	+ 13"
5	Tim Declercq (BEL)	Topsport Vlaanderen–Baloise	+ 13"
6	Bob Jungels (LUX)	RadioShack–Leopard	+ 4' 18"
7	Tom Van Asbroeck (BEL)	Topsport Vlaanderen–Baloise	+ 12' 11"
8	Yannick Eijssen (BEL)	BMC Racing Team	+ 13' 08"
9	Taylor Phinney (USA)	BMC Racing Team	+ 13' 50"
10	Marc Goos (NED)	Belkin Pro Cycling	+ 16' 06"

=== Sprint classification ===
Final sprint classification (1-10)
Rank	Rider	Team	Time
1	Stijn Steels (BEL)	Crelan–Euphony	25
2	Christophe Prémont (BEL)	Crelan–Euphony	20
3	Boris Vallée (BEL)	Color Code–Biowanze	11
4	Laurent Mangel (FRA)	FDJ.fr	10
5	Jack Bobridge (AUS)	Belkin Pro Cycling	9
6	Sébastien Delfosse (BEL)	Crelan–Euphony	7
7	Tom Dernies (BEL)	Wallonie-Bruxelles	7
8	Tim Wellens (BEL)	Lotto–Belisol	6
9	Greg Van Avermaet (BEL)	BMC Racing Team	5
10	Laurens De Vreese (BEL)	Topsport Vlaanderen–Baloise	5

=== Combativity classification ===
Final combatifity classification (1-10)
Rank	Rider	Team	Time
1	Christophe Prémont (BEL)	Crelan–Euphony	10
2	Stijn Steels (BEL)	Crelan–Euphony	6
3	Boris Dron (BEL)	Wallonie-Bruxelles	5
4	Boris Vallée (BEL)	Color Code–Biowanze	5
5	Marco Marcato (ITA)	Vacansoleil–DCM	3
6	Tiago Machado (POR)	RadioShack–Leopard	3
7	Tom Dernies (BEL)	Wallonie-Bruxelles	3
8	Jack Bobridge (AUS)	Belkin Pro Cycling	3
9	Alexandre Pichot (FRA)	Team Europcar	3
10	Ben Gastauer (LUX)	Ag2r–La Mondiale	1

=== Teams classification ===
Final teams classification (1-10)
Rank	Team	Time
1	FDJ.fr	66h 25' 44"
2	Topsport Vlaanderen–Baloise	+ 12"
3	Lotto–Belisol	+ 49"
4	Cofidis	+ 1' 01"
5	RadioShack–Leopard	+ 1' 12"
6	Omega Pharma–Quick-Step	+ 1' 37"
7	Accent Jobs–Wanty	+ 1' 54"
8	BMC Racing Team	+ 12' 38"
9	Belkin Pro Cycling	+ 16' 03"
10	Team Katusha	+ 17' 10"
