= 2016 Étoile de Bessèges =

UCI Europe Tour

Race details
- Dates: February 3, 2016–February 7, 2016
- Stages: 5
- Distance: 621 km (385.9 mi)
- Winning time: 14h 49' 26"

Results
Jersey awarded to the overall winner	Winner	Jérôme Coppel (FRA)	(IAM Cycling)
	Second	Tony Gallopin (FRA)	(Lotto–Soudal)
	Third	Thibaut Pinot (FRA)	(FDJ)
Jersey awarded to the points classification winner	Points	Bryan Coquard (FRA)	(Direct Énergie)
Jersey awarded to the mountains classification winner	Mountains	Roland Thalmann (SUI)	(Team Roth)
Jersey awarded to the youth classification winner	Youth	Pierre Latour (FRA)	(AG2R La Mondiale)
	Team	FDJ	

The 2016 Étoile de Bessèges (English: Star of Bessèges) was a road cycling stage race that took place between 3 and 7 February 2016. The race was rated as a 2.1 event as part of the 2016 UCI Europe Tour. It was the 46th edition of the Étoile de Bessèges cycling race.

The race included five stages. The first four were road stages; the fifth and final stage was a 12-kilometre (7.5 mi) individual time trial. The champion of the 2015 Étoile de Bessèges, Bob Jungels, did not take part in the 2016 event as his team, Etixx–Quick-Step, was not among those invited.

The first two stages were won in sprints by Bryan Coquard (Direct Énergie), giving him the lead of the race. His teammate, Sylvain Chavanel, won a reduced sprint on the following stage to take over the race lead. He retained this lead in the following stage, won in a breakaway by Ángel Madrazo (Caja Rural–Seguros RGA). He lost his lead, however, in the final stage time trial: he lost 30 seconds to Jérôme Coppel, who therefore won the race overall. Tony Gallopin (Lotto–Soudal) came second, with Thibaut Pinot (FDJ) third. Chavanel finished fourth. Coquard won the points classification and FDJ won the team classification. Roland Thalmann (Team Roth) won the mountains classification and Pierre Latour (AG2R La Mondiale) won the youth classification, having finished seventh overall.

== Teams ==
Nineteen teams were invited to start the race. These included four UCI WorldTeams, six UCI Professional Continental teams and nine UCI Continental teams.

UCI WorldTeams

- Lotto–Soudal
- FDJ
- AG2R La Mondiale
- IAM Cycling

UCI Professional Continental teams

- Direct Énergie
- Caja Rural–Seguros RGA
- Cofidis
- Fortuneo–Vital Concept
- Topsport Vlaanderen–Baloise
- Wanty–Groupe Gobert

UCI Continental teams

- Delko–Marseille Provence KTM
- Roubaix–Métropole Européenne de Lille
- HP BTP–Auber93
- Team Roth
- Wallonie-Bruxelles–Group Protect
- Armée de Terre
- An Post–Chain Reaction
- Veranclassic–Ago
- Verandas Willems

== Stages ==
Stage schedule
Stage	Date	Route	Distance	Type	Winner
1	3 February	Bellegarde–Beaucaire	156 km (97 mi)	Hilly stage	Bryan Coquard (FRA)
2	4 February	Nîmes–Méjannes-le-Clap	153 km (95 mi)	Hilly stage	Bryan Coquard (FRA)
3	5 February	Bessèges–Bessèges	152 km (94 mi)	Hilly stage	Sylvain Chavanel (FRA)
4	6 February	Tavel–Laudun	148 km (92 mi)	Hilly stage	Ángel Madrazo (ESP)
5	7 February	Alès–Alès	12 km (7 mi)	Individual time trial	Jérôme Coppel (FRA)

=== Stage 1 ===
3 February 2016 – Bellegarde–Beaucaire, 156 km (97 mi)

Result of Stage 1
Rank	Rider	Team	Time
1	Bryan Coquard (FRA)	Direct Énergie	3h 25' 38"
2	Timothy Dupont (BEL)	Verandas Willems	+ 0"
3	Antoine Demoitié (BEL)	Wanty–Groupe Gobert	+ 0"
4	Rudy Barbier (FRA)	Roubaix–Métropole Européenne de Lille	+ 0"
5	Tosh Van der Sande (BEL)	Lotto–Soudal	+ 0"
6	Baptiste Planckaert (BEL)	Wallonie-Bruxelles–Group Protect	+ 0"
7	Bert Van Lerberghe (BEL)	Topsport Vlaanderen–Baloise	+ 0"
8	Anthony Maldonado (FRA)	HP BTP–Auber93	+ 0"
9	Justin Jules (FRA)	Veranclassic–Ago	+ 0"
10	Arnaud Démare (FRA)	FDJ	+ 0"

General classification after Stage 1
Rank	Rider	Team	Time
1	Bryan Coquard (FRA)	Direct Énergie	3h 25' 28"
2	Timothy Dupont (BEL)	Verandas Willems	+ 4"
3	Antoine Demoitié (BEL)	Wanty–Groupe Gobert	+ 6"
4	Tony Gallopin (FRA)	Lotto–Soudal	+ 7"
5	Sean De Bie (BEL)	Lotto–Soudal	+ 9"
6	Rudy Barbier (FRA)	Roubaix–Métropole Européenne de Lille	+ 10"
7	Baptiste Planckaert (BEL)	Wallonie-Bruxelles–Group Protect	+ 10"
8	Bert Van Lerberghe (BEL)	Topsport Vlaanderen–Baloise	+ 10"
9	Anthony Maldonado (FRA)	HP BTP–Auber93	+ 10"
10	Justin Jules (FRA)	Veranclassic–Ago	+ 10"

=== Stage 2 ===
4 February – Nîmes–Méjannes-le-Clap, 153 km (95 mi)

Result of Stage 2
Rank	Rider	Team	Time
1	Bryan Coquard (FRA)	Direct Énergie	3h 51' 23"
2	Matteo Pelucchi (ITA)	IAM Cycling	+ 0"
3	Dimitri Claeys (BEL)	Wanty–Groupe Gobert	+ 0"
4	Bert Van Lerberghe (BEL)	Topsport Vlaanderen–Baloise	+ 0"
5	Arnaud Démare (FRA)	FDJ	+ 0"
6	Romain Feillu (FRA)	HP BTP–Auber93	+ 0"
7	Antoine Demoitié (BEL)	Wanty–Groupe Gobert	+ 0"
8	Adrien Petit (FRA)	Direct Énergie	+ 0"
9	Mickaël Delage (FRA)	FDJ	+ 0"
10	Nicolas Vereecken (BEL)	An Post–Chain Reaction	+ 0"

General classification after Stage 2
Rank	Rider	Team	Time
1	Bryan Coquard (FRA)	Direct Énergie	7h 16' 41"
2	Dimitri Claeys (BEL)	Wanty–Groupe Gobert	+ 13"
3	Timothy Dupont (BEL)	Verandas Willems	+ 14"
4	Matteo Pelucchi (ITA)	IAM Cycling	+ 14"
5	Antoine Demoitié (BEL)	Wanty–Groupe Gobert	+ 16"
6	Tony Gallopin (FRA)	Lotto–Soudal	+ 17"
7	Kai Reus (NED)	Verandas Willems	+ 18"
8	Sean De Bie (BEL)	Lotto–Soudal	+ 19"
9	Bert Van Lerberghe (BEL)	Topsport Vlaanderen–Baloise	+ 20"
10	Arnaud Démare (FRA)	FDJ	+ 20"

=== Stage 3 ===
5 February – Bessèges–Bessèges, 152 km (94 mi)

Result of Stage 3
Rank	Rider	Team	Time
1	Sylvain Chavanel (FRA)	Direct Énergie	3h 40' 06"
2	Tony Gallopin (FRA)	Lotto–Soudal	+ 0"
3	Arthur Vichot (FRA)	FDJ	+ 0"
4	Sébastien Delfosse (BEL)	Wallonie-Bruxelles–Group Protect	+ 0"
5	Jérôme Cousin (FRA)	Cofidis	+ 0"
6	Romain Hardy (FRA)	Cofidis	+ 0"
7	Fabricio Ferrari (URY)	Caja Rural–Seguros RGA	+ 0"
8	Flavien Dassonville (FRA)	HP BTP–Auber93	+ 0"
9	Boris Dron (BEL)	Wanty–Groupe Gobert	+ 0"
10	Maxime Cam (FRA)	Fortuneo–Vital Concept	+ 0"

General classification after Stage 3
Rank	Rider	Team	Time
1	Sylvain Chavanel (FRA)	Direct Énergie	10h 56' 53"
2	Tony Gallopin (FRA)	Lotto–Soudal	+ 2"
3	Arthur Vichot (FRA)	FDJ	+ 9"
4	Boris Dron (BEL)	Wanty–Groupe Gobert	+ 11"
5	Jérôme Cousin (FRA)	Cofidis	+ 12"
6	Angelo Tulik (FRA)	Direct Énergie	+ 14"
7	Anthony Delaplace (FRA)	Fortuneo–Vital Concept	+ 14"
8	Antoine Warnier (BEL)	Wallonie-Bruxelles–Group Protect	+ 14"
9	Flavien Dassonville (FRA)	HP BTP–Auber93	+ 14"
10	Hubert Dupont (FRA)	AG2R La Mondiale	+ 14"

=== Stage 4 ===
6 February – Tavel–Laudun, 148 km (92 mi)

Result of Stage 4
Rank	Rider	Team	Time
1	Ángel Madrazo (ESP)	Caja Rural–Seguros RGA	3h 35' 18"
2	Evaldas Šiškevičius (LIT)	Delko–Marseille Provence KTM	+ 2"
3	Dieter Bouvry (BEL)	Roubaix–Métropole Européenne de Lille	+ 4"
4	Frédéric Brun (FRA)	Fortuneo–Vital Concept	+ 7"
5	Jacob Scott (GBR)	An Post–Chain Reaction	+ 11"
6	Thomas Rostollan (FRA)	Armée de Terre	+ 11"
7	Timothy Dupont (BEL)	Verandas Willems	+ 13"
8	Sylvain Chavanel (FRA)	Direct Énergie	+ 13"
9	Romain Feillu (FRA)	HP BTP–Auber93	+ 13"
10	Baptiste Planckaert (BEL)	Wallonie-Bruxelles–Group Protect	+ 13"

General classification after Stage 4
Rank	Rider	Team	Time
1	Sylvain Chavanel (FRA)	Direct Énergie	14h 32' 24"
2	Tony Gallopin (FRA)	Lotto–Soudal	+ 2"
3	Arthur Vichot (FRA)	FDJ	+ 9"
4	Jérôme Cousin (FRA)	Cofidis	+ 12"
5	Anthony Delaplace (FRA)	Fortuneo–Vital Concept	+ 14"
6	Pierre Latour (FRA)	AG2R La Mondiale	+ 14"
7	Dries Devenyns (BEL)	IAM Cycling	+ 14"
8	Thibaut Pinot (FRA)	FDJ	+ 14"
9	Romain Hardy (FRA)	Cofidis	+ 14"
10	Sébastien Delfosse (BEL)	Wallonie-Bruxelles–Group Protect	+ 14"

=== Stage 5 ===
7 February – Alès–Alès, 12 km (7 mi) (ITT

Result of Stage 5
Rank	Rider	Team	Time
1	Jérôme Coppel (FRA)	IAM Cycling	+ 16' 48"
2	Thibaut Pinot (FRA)	FDJ	+ 14"
3	Jean-Christophe Péraud (FRA)	AG2R La Mondiale	+ 15"
4	Tony Gallopin (FRA)	Lotto–Soudal	+ 25"
5	Sylvain Chavanel (FRA)	Direct Énergie	+ 30"
6	Dries Devenyns (BEL)	IAM Cycling	+ 33"
7	Arthur Vichot (FRA)	FDJ	+ 33"
8	Pierre Latour (FRA)	AG2R La Mondiale	+ 40"
9	Sander Armée (BEL)	Lotto–Soudal	+ 40"
10	Maxime Monfort (BEL)	Lotto–Soudal	+ 43"

General classification after General Classification
Rank	Rider	Team	Time
1	Jérôme Coppel (FRA)	IAM Cycling	14h 49' 26"
2	Tony Gallopin (FRA)	Lotto–Soudal	+ 13"
3	Thibaut Pinot (FRA)	FDJ	+ 14"
4	Sylvain Chavanel (FRA)	Direct Énergie	+ 16"
5	Arthur Vichot (FRA)	FDJ	+ 28"
6	Dries Devenyns (BEL)	IAM Cycling	+ 33"
7	Pierre Latour (FRA)	AG2R La Mondiale	+ 40"
8	Maxime Monfort (BEL)	Lotto–Soudal	+ 49"
9	Anthony Delaplace (FRA)	Fortuneo–Vital Concept	+ 53"
10	Julien Antomarchi (FRA)	Roubaix–Métropole Européenne de Lille	+ 1' 00"
