= 2014 Grote Prijs Jef Scherens =

2014 UCI Europe Tour
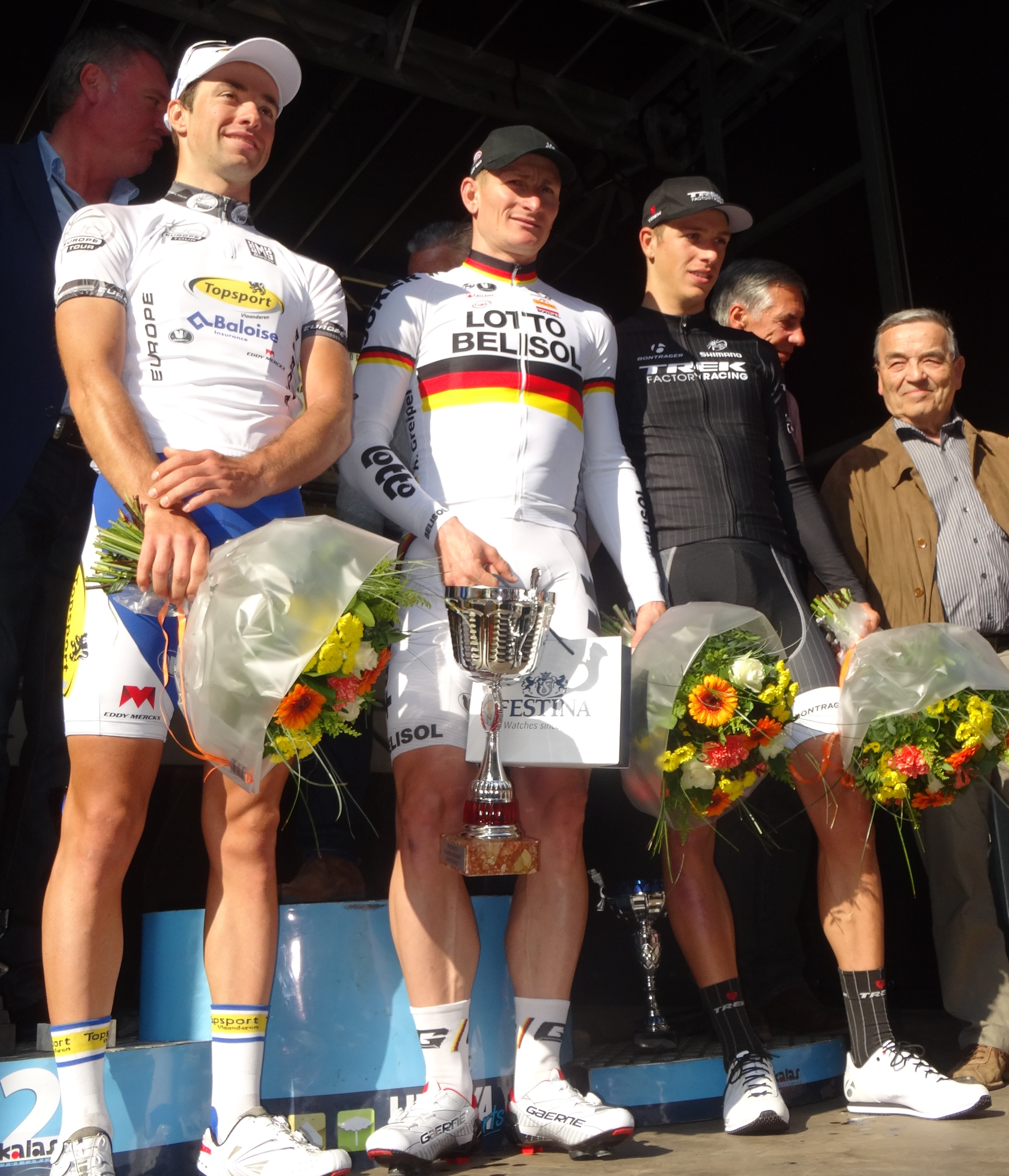
- The final podium: Tom Van Asbroeck, André Greipel and Danny van Poppel

Race details
- Dates: 14 September 2014
- Stages: 1
- Distance: 183.3 km (113.9 mi)
- Winning time: 4h 15' 56"

Results
| | Winner | André Greipel (GER) | (Lotto–Belisol) |
| | Second | Tom Van Asbroeck (BEL) | (Topsport Vlaanderen–Baloise) |
| | Third | Danny van Poppel (NED) | (Trek Factory Racing) |

The 2014 Grote Prijs Jef Scherens was the 48th edition of the Grote Prijs Jef Scherens cycle race and was held on 14 September 2014. The race started and finished in Leuven. The race was won by André Greipel.

== Teams ==
20 teams and 150 riders started the race.

- Androni Giocattoli–Venezuela
- Cycling Team Jo Piels
- Cyclingteam de Rijke
- Development Team Giant–Shimano
- Josan–To Win
- Leopard Development Team
- Lotto–Belisol
- Team3M
- Netherlands (national team)
- Parkhotel Valkenburg Continental Team
- Rietumu–Delfin
- Sunweb–Napoleon Games
- T.Palm–Pôle Continental Wallon
- Topsport Vlaanderen–Baloise
- Trek Factory Racing
- Vastgoedservice–Golden Palace
- Veranclassic–Doltcini
- Verandas Willems
- Wallonie-Bruxelles
- Wanty–Groupe Gobert

== Results ==
| Rank | Rider | Team | Time |
|---|---|---|---|
| 1 | André Greipel (GER) | Lotto–Belisol | 4h 15' 56" |
| 2 | Tom Van Asbroeck (BEL) | Topsport Vlaanderen–Baloise | + 0" |
| 3 | Danny van Poppel (NED) | Trek Factory Racing | + 0" |
| 4 | Kenny van Hummel (NED) | Androni Giocattoli–Venezuela | + 0" |
| 5 | Kenneth Vanbilsen (BEL) | Topsport Vlaanderen–Baloise | + 0" |
| 6 | Jempy Drucker (LUX) | Wanty–Groupe Gobert | + 0" |
| 7 | Antoine Demoitié (BEL) | Wallonie-Bruxelles | + 0" |
| 8 | Laurens De Vreese (BEL) | Wanty–Groupe Gobert | + 0" |
| 9 | Coen Vermeltfoort (NED) | Cyclingteam de Rijke | + 0" |
| 10 | Mike Teunissen (NED) | Netherlands (national team) | + 0" |
