= Laurent Évrard =

Belgian cyclist

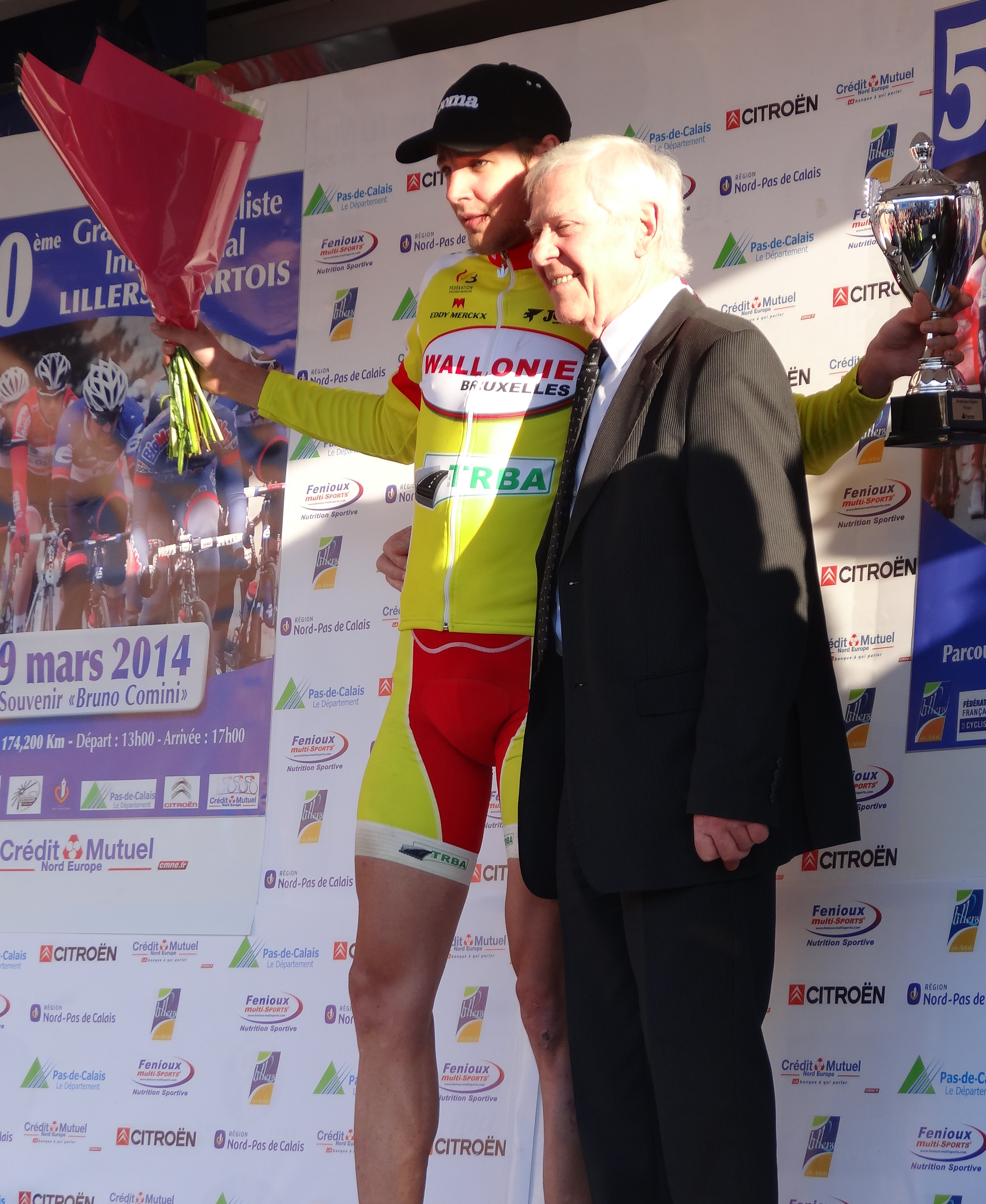
- Évrard in 2014

Personal information
- Full name: Laurent Évrard
- Born: 22 September 1990 (age 36) Beauvechain, Belgium
- Height: 1.83 m (6 ft 0 in)
- Weight: 65 kg (143 lb)

Cycling career
- Sport: Cycling
- Current team: VC Amateur Saint-Quentin
- Discipline: Road
- Role: Rider

Amateur teams
- 2011: UC Seraing Crabbé Performance
- 2011: Lotto–Bodysol–Pôle Continental Wallon (stagiaire)
- 2017: VC Villefranche Beaujolais
- 2020–: VC Amateur Saint-Quentin

Professional teams
- 2012–2015: Wallonie Bruxelles–Crédit Agricole
- 2016: Team3M
- 2018–2019: Sovac–Natura4Ever
- 2019: Meridiana–Kamen

Laurent Évrard (born 22 September 1990) is a Belgian cyclist, who currently rides for French amateur team VC Amateur Saint-Quentin.

== Major results ==
2012
10th Paris–Tours Espoirs
10th Circuit de Wallonie
2013
3rd Overall Tour of Szeklerland
6th Grote Prijs Stad Geel
10th Overall Tour de Wallonie
10th Ronde van Overijssel
2014
5th Internationale Wielertrofee Jong Maar Moedig
6th Tour du Finistère
8th Overall Tour de Luxembourg
8th Overall Le Triptyque des Monts et Châteaux
9th Overall Circuit des Ardennes
10th Grand Prix de la Ville de Lillers
2015
10th Velothon Wales
2016
4th Omloop Het Nieuwsblad Beloften
8th Cholet-Pays de Loire
9th ZODC Zuidenveld Tour
2018
1st Overall Tour International de la Wilaya d'Oran

1st Points classification
1st Mountains classification
1st Stage 1

2019
1st Overall Tour du Maroc

1st Stage 3
