= Tom Dernies =

Belgian cyclist

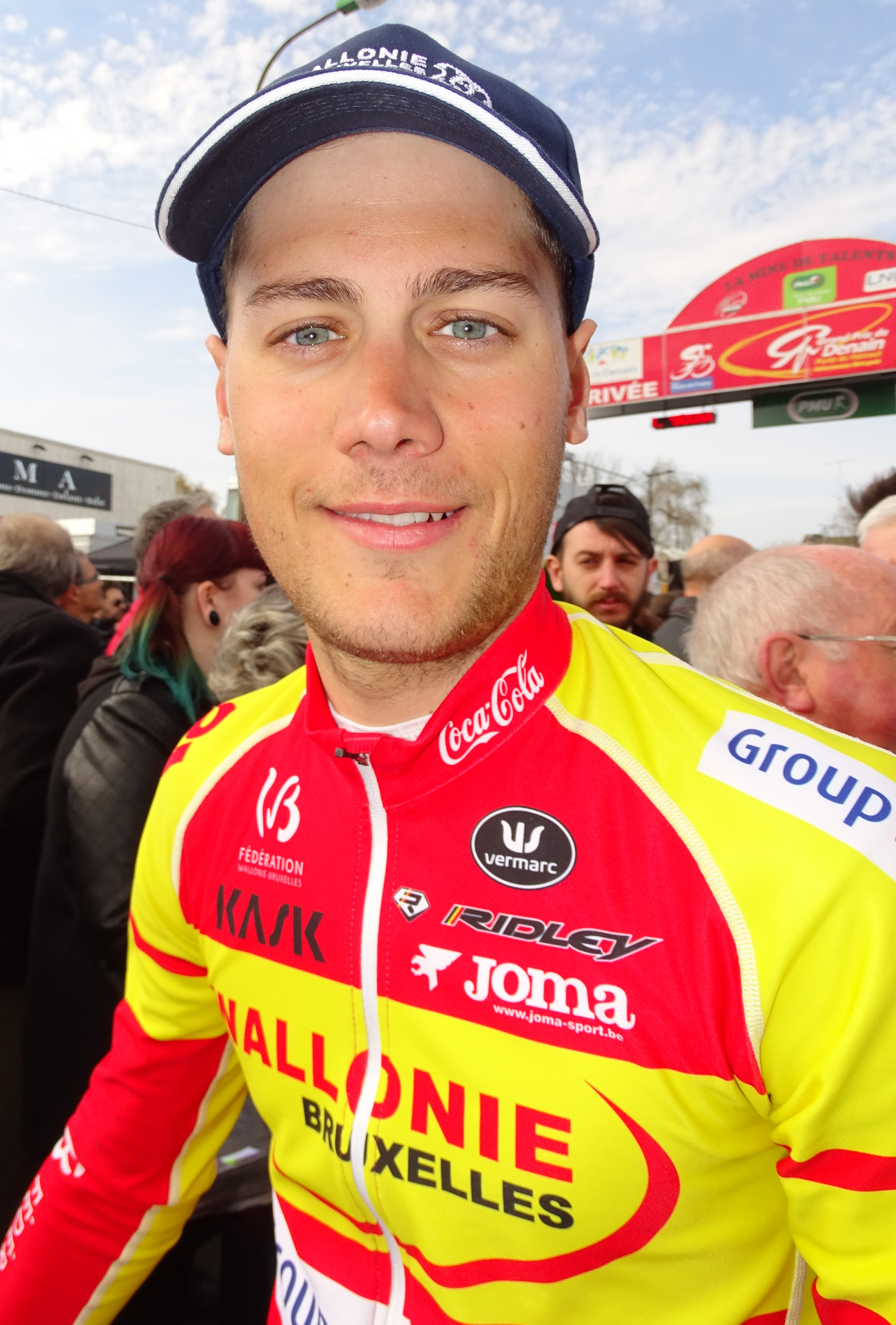
- Dernies in 2016

Personal information
- Full name: Tom Dernies
- Born: 22 November 1990 (age 35) Soignies, Belgium
- Height: 1.80 m (5 ft 11 in)
- Weight: 68 kg (150 lb)

Cycling career
- Sport: Cycling
- Current team: Dunkerque Grand Littoral–Cofidis
- Discipline: Road
- Role: Rider

Amateur teams
- 2010: RC Pesant Club Liégeois
- 2021–: Dunkerque Grand Littoral–Cofidis

Professional teams
- 2011: Lotto–Bodysol–Pôle Continental Wallon
- 2012–2017: Wallonie Bruxelles–Crédit Agricole
- 2018–2020: Roubaix–Lille Métropole

Tom Dernies (born 22 November 1990 in Soignies) is a Belgian cyclist, who currently rides for French amateur team Dunkerque Grand Littoral–Cofidis. His father Michel Dernies also competed professionally as a cyclist.

== Major results ==
2012
4th Omloop Het Nieuwsblad Beloften
7th Ronde Pévéloise
2013
2nd Flèche Ardennaise
3rd Kattekoers
4th Beverbeek Classic
6th Grand Prix de la ville de Nogent-sur-Oise
6th Memorial Van Coningsloo
2014
1st Mountains classification Tour de Luxembourg
1st Mountains classification Tour de l'Eurométropole
6th Kattekoers
7th Overall Circuit des Ardennes
10th Classic Loire Atlantique
10th Le Samyn
2015
7th Tour du Doubs
2019
8th Grand Prix de la ville de Nogent-sur-Oise
