= Gilles Devillers =

Belgian cyclist

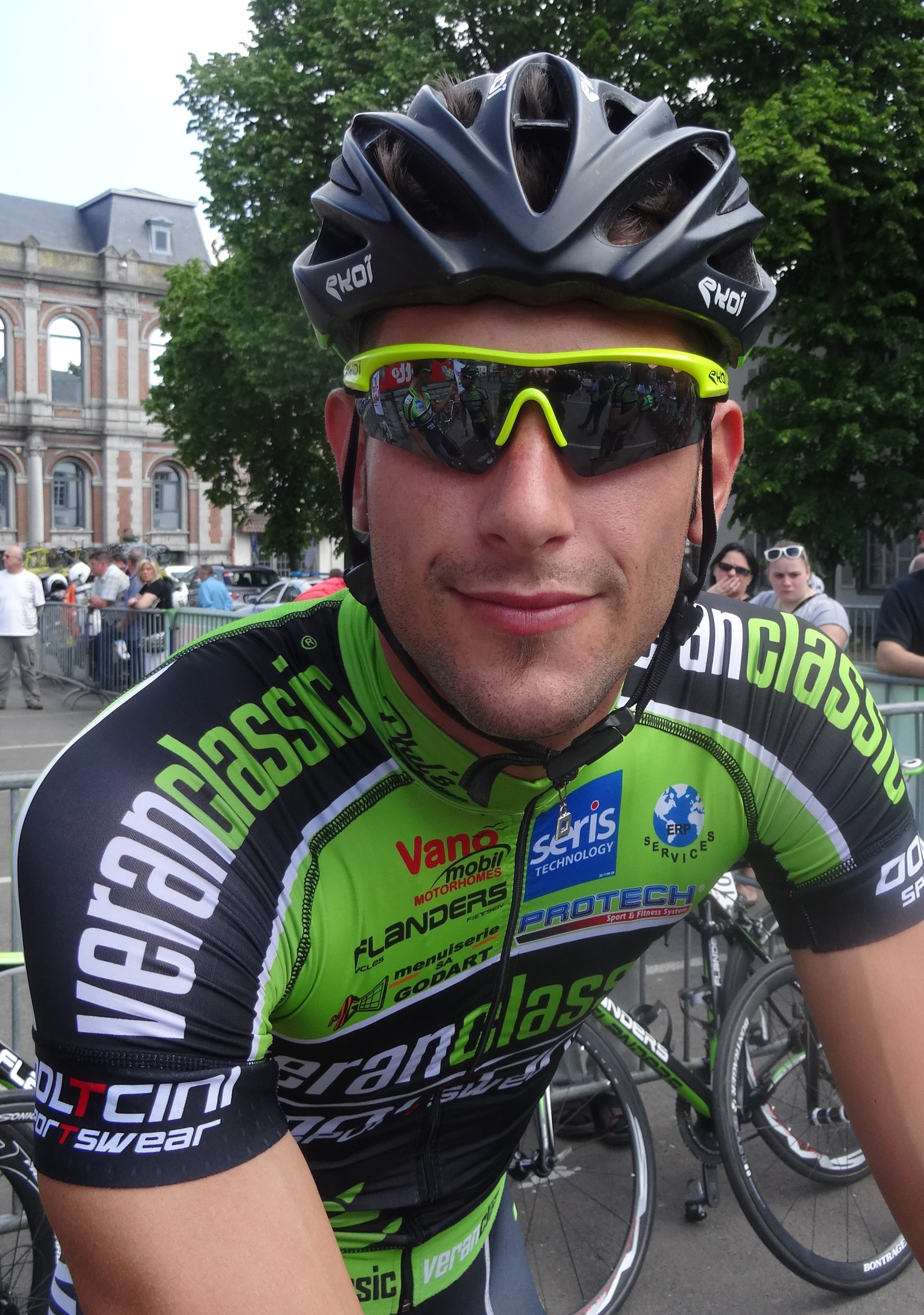
- Gilles Devillers in 2014

Personal information
- Born: 12 February 1985 (age 41) Gerpinnes, Belgium

Cycling career
- Sport: Cycling
- Current team: Retired
- Discipline: Road
- Role: Rider

Amateur teams
- 2005: R.A.G.T. Semences (stagiaire)
- 2006–2007: Storez Ledecq Matériaux
- 2015: Ottignies–Perwez

Professional teams
- 2010: Lotto–Bodysol
- 2011: Wallonie Bruxelles–Crédit Agricole
- 2012–2013: Landbouwkrediet–Euphony
- 2014: Veranclassic–Doltcini

Gilles Devillers (born 12 February 1985) is a Belgian former professional racing cyclist.

== Major results ==
2010
7th Overall Kreiz Breizh Elites
2011
3rd Overall Mi-Août en Bretagne
7th Overall Tour de Bretagne
9th Overall Circuit des Ardennes
2012
1st Mountains classification Tour du Limousin
