= Stenuit =

Stenuit or Sténuit is a surname, commonly used in Belgium. Notable people with the surname include:

- Robert Sténuit (1933–2024), Belgian journalist, writer, and underwater archeologist
- Robin Stenuit (born 1990), Belgian cyclist
