= Boris Dron =

Belgian cyclist

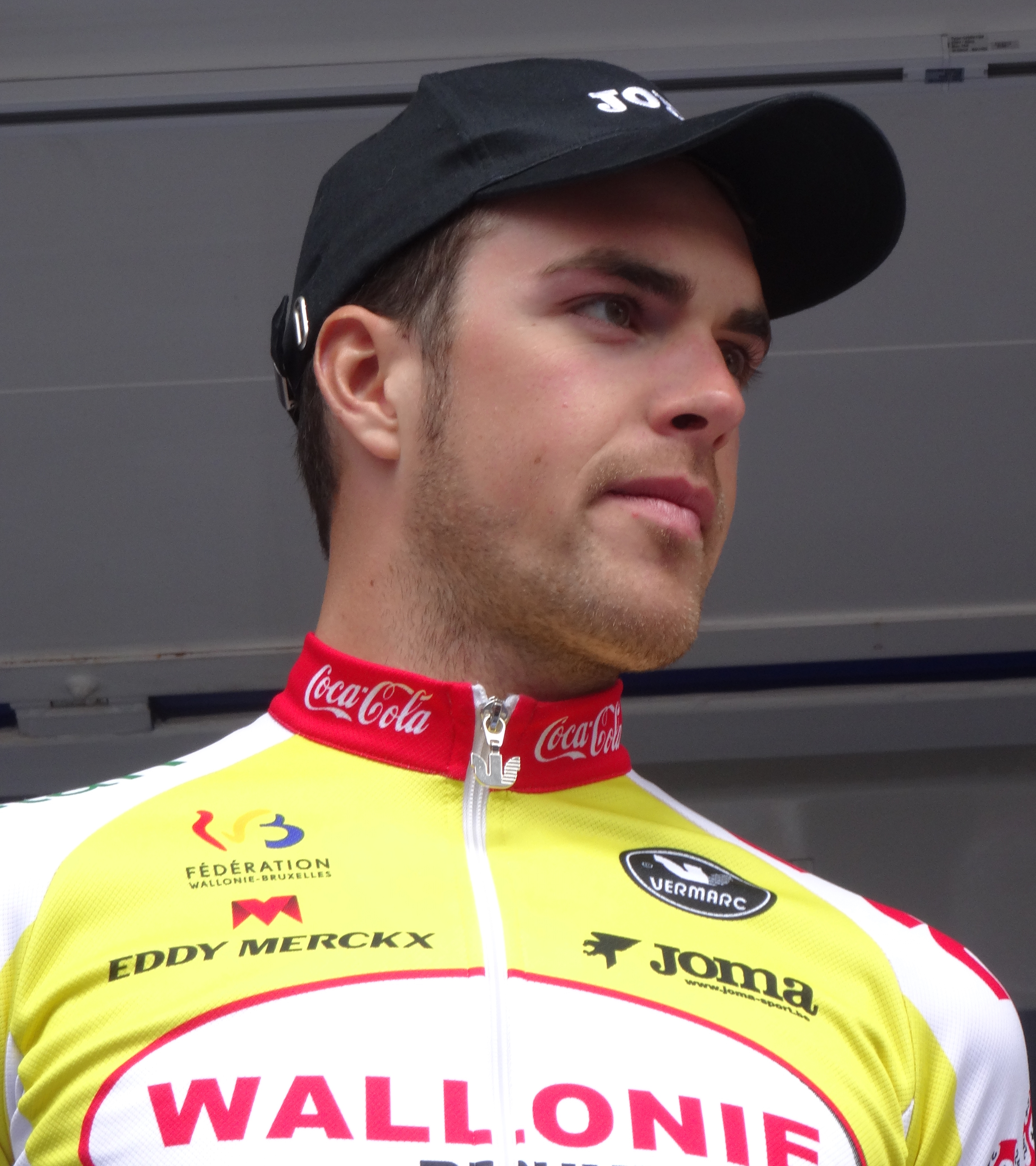
- Dron in 2014

Personal information
- Full name: Boris Dron
- Born: 17 March 1988 (age 38) Virton, Belgium
- Height: 1.83 m (6 ft 0 in)
- Weight: 72 kg (159 lb)

Cycling career
- Sport: Cycling
- Current team: Retired
- Discipline: Road
- Role: Rider
- Rider type: Sprinter

Amateur team
- 2017: Vérandas Willems–Crabbé–CC Chevigny

Professional teams
- 2010–2011: Lotto–Bodysol
- 2012–2014: Wallonie Bruxelles–Crédit Agricole
- 2015–2016: Wanty–Groupe Gobert
- 2017: Tarteletto–Isorex

Boris Dron (born 17 March 1988) is a Belgian former professional racing cyclist, who rode professionally between 2010 and 2017.

== Major results ==
2011
8th Kattekoers
2012
3rd De Vlaamse Pijl
6th Overall Ronde de l'Oise
8th Dwars door het Hageland
9th Ronde Pévéloise
2013
2nd Grote Prijs Stad Zottegem
2nd Gooikse Pijl
5th Kattekoers
5th Antwerpse Havenpijl
2014
3rd Kattekoers
3rd Flèche Ardennaise
6th Overall Tour du Gévaudan Languedoc-Roussillon
