= Robin Stenuit =

Belgian cyclist (born 1990)

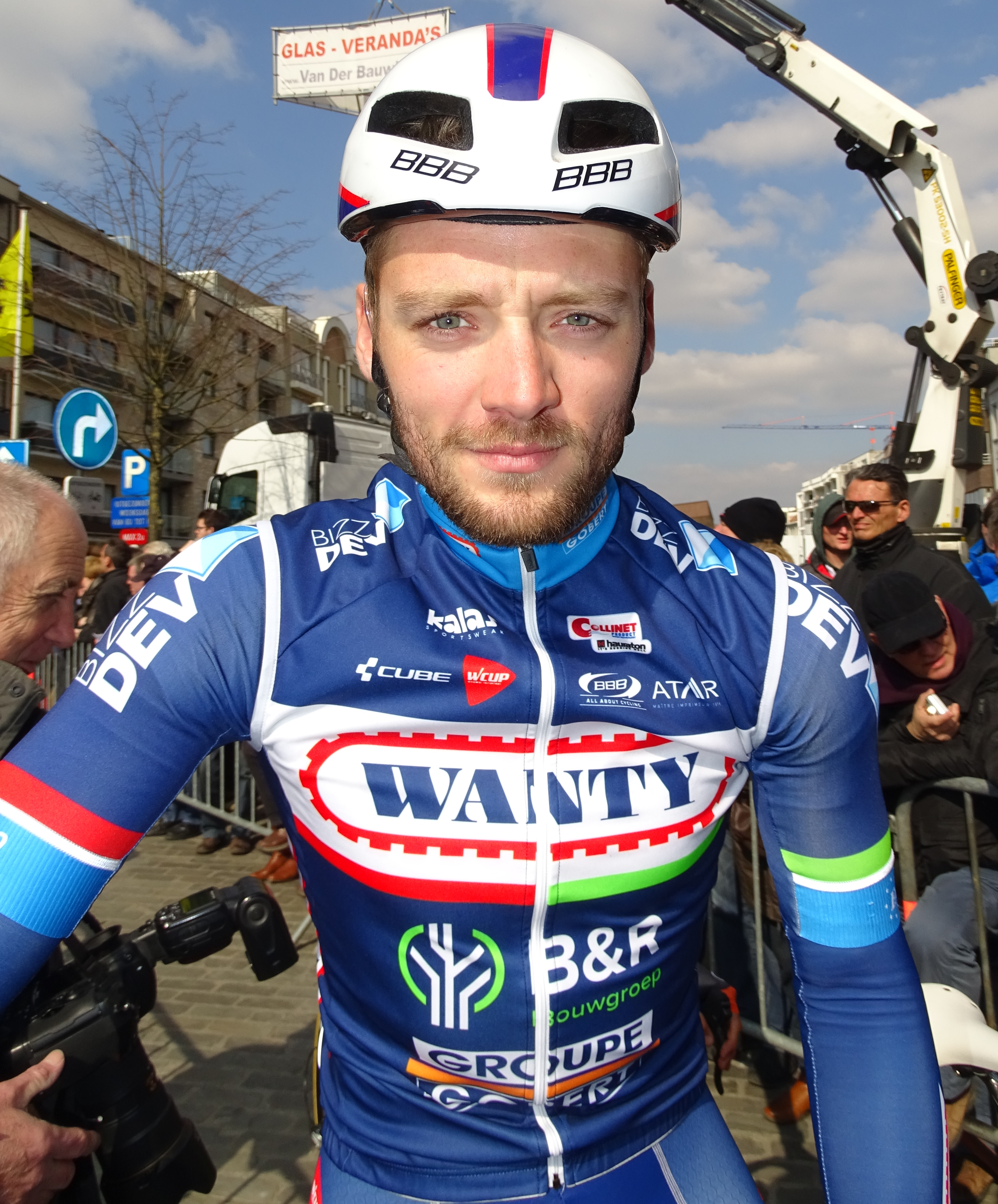
- Stenuit in 2016

Personal information
- Born: 16 June 1990 (age 36) Louvain-la-Neuve, Belgium
- Height: 1.85 m (6 ft 1 in)
- Weight: 77 kg (170 lb)

Cycling career
- Sport: Cycling
- Discipline: Road
- Role: Rider

Amateur teams
- 2009: Verandas Willems (stagiaire)
- 2013: Ottignies–Perwez
- 2015: Wanty–Groupe Gobert (stagiaire)
- 2019–2021: V.C. Amateur Saint Quentin

Professional teams
- 2010: Verandas Willems
- 2011–2012: Wallonie Bruxelles–Crédit Agricole
- 2014: Wallonie-Bruxelles
- 2015: Veranclassic–Ekoi
- 2016–2017: Wanty–Groupe Gobert
- 2018: Sovac–Natura4Ever

Robin Stenuit (born 16 June 1990 in Louvain-la-Neuve) is a Belgian cyclist, who most recently rode for French amateur team V.C. Amateur Saint Quentin. In September 2015 Stenuit announced that he would be riding for Wanty–Groupe Gobert in 2016 after scoring a win for the team at Schaal Sels whilst riding for them as a stagiaire.

== Major results ==
2011
2nd ZLM Tour
8th Beverbeek Classic
2012
6th De Vlaamse Pijl
2013
1st Omloop van Grensstreek
9th Grote 1-MeiPrijs
2014
2nd De Kustpijl
2015
1st Schaal Sels
1st Grand Prix de la ville de Nogent-sur-Oise
1st Memorial Van Coningsloo
3rd Overall Tour de Gironde

1st Stage 1

6th Ronde van Limburg
10th De Kustpijl
2016
8th Grand Prix Impanis-Van Petegem
9th Münsterland Giro
2017
4th Nationale Sluitingsprijs
7th Tacx Pro Classic
2018
10th Grand Prix Albert Fauville-Baulet
2019
3rd Grand Prix de la ville de Pérenchies
