= 2021 Nokere Koerse =

2021 UCI Europe Tour 2021 UCI ProSeries

Race details
- Dates: 17 March 2021
- Stages: 1
- Distance: 195 km (121 mi)
- Winning time: 4h 36' 44"

Results
	Winner	Ludovic Robeet (BEL)	(Bingoal WB)
	Second	Damien Gaudin (FRA)	(Total Direct Énergie)
	Third	Luca Mozzato (ITA)	(B&B Hotels p/b KTM)

The 2021 Danilith Nokere Koerse was the 75th edition of the Nokere Koerse road cycling one day race, which was held on 16 March 2021, starting in Deinze and finishing in the titular town of Nokere. The 1.Pro-category race was initially scheduled to be a part of the inaugural edition of the UCI ProSeries, but after the 2020 edition was cancelled due to the COVID-19 pandemic, it made its UCI ProSeries debut in 2021, while also still being a part of the 2021 UCI Europe Tour.

Ludovic Robeet and Damien Gaudin had been part of the initial eight-man breakaway of the race, and with 15 kilometers to go, they dropped their breakaway companions just before a late cobble sector. In the final two kilometers, with them being in sight of the peloton, Robeet dropped Gaudin with a hard acceleration to solo away for his second professional win. Gaudin managed to hold on and finish in second place ahead of the peloton. Meanwhile, Luca Mozzato, who had been one of the late attackers that unsuccessfully tried to bridge across to the leading duo, managed to just stay ahead of the peloton to finish third on the line ahead of Jordi Meeus, who was the fastest of the bunch behind.

== Teams ==
Thirteen of the nineteen UCI WorldTeams, eleven UCI ProTeams, and one UCI Continental team made up the twenty-five teams that participated in the race. Though teams were allowed to enter up to seven riders, four teams, those being AG2R Citroën Team, Bardiani–CSF–Faizanè, Cofidis, and UAE Team Emirates, only entered six each, while INEOS Grenadiers and Trek–Segafredo only entered five each. Of the 167 riders entered into the race, there were 86 finishers and one non-starter.

UCI WorldTeams

- AG2R Citroën Team
- Bora–Hansgrohe
- Cofidis
- Deceuninck–Quick-Step
- Groupama–FDJ
- INEOS Grenadiers
- Intermarché–Wanty–Gobert Matériaux
- Israel Start-Up Nation
- Lotto–Soudal
- Team DSM
- Team Qhubeka Assos
- Trek–Segafredo
- UAE Team Emirates

UCI ProTeams

- Alpecin–Fenix
- Arkéa–Samsic
- B&B Hotels p/b KTM
- Bardiani–CSF–Faizanè
- Bingoal WB
- Delko
- Rally Cycling
- Sport Vlaanderen–Baloise
- Total Direct Énergie
- Uno-X Pro Cycling Team
- Vini Zabù

UCI Continental Teams

- Tarteletto–Isorex

== Result ==
Result
Rank	Rider	Team	Time
1	Ludovic Robeet (BEL)	Bingoal WB	4h 36' 44"
2	Damien Gaudin (FRA)	Total Direct Énergie	+ 3"
3	Luca Mozzato (ITA)	B&B Hotels p/b KTM	+ 5"
4	Jordi Meeus (BEL)	Bora–Hansgrohe	+ 5"
5	Tom Van Asbroeck (BEL)	Israel Start-Up Nation	+ 5"
6	Jake Stewart (GBR)	Groupama–FDJ	+ 5"
7	Max Walscheid (GER)	Team Qhubeka Assos	+ 5"
8	Kristoffer Halvorsen (NOR)	Uno-X Pro Cycling Team	+ 5"
9	Jhonatan Narváez (ECU)	INEOS Grenadiers	+ 5"
10	Rudy Barbier (FRA)	Israel Start-Up Nation	+ 5"
