= 2017 La Drôme Classic =

2017 UCI Europe Tour

Race details
- Dates: 26 February 2017
- Stages: 1
- Distance: 206 km (128 mi)
- Winning time: 5h 06' 49"

Results
	Winner	Sébastien Delfosse (BEL)
	Second	Arthur Vichot (FRA)
	Third	Jan Bakelants (BEL)

The 2017 Royal Bernard Drome Classic was the fourth edition of the La Drôme Classic road cycling one day race. It was held on 26 February 2017 as part of UCI Europe Tour in category 1.1.

== Teams ==
Seventeen teams of up to eight riders started the race:

UCI WorldTeams

- AG2R La Mondiale
- FDJ

UCI Professional Continental teams

- Caja Rural–Seguros RGA
- Cofidis
- Direct Énergie
- Roompot–Nederlandse Loterij
- Wanty–Groupe Gobert
- Aqua Blue Sport
- CCC–Sprandi–Polkowice
- Delko–Marseille Provence KTM
- Sport Vlaanderen–Baloise
- WB Veranclassic Aqua Protect
- Androni Giocattoli–Sidermec
- Fortuneo–Vital Concept

UCI Continental teams

- Armée de Terre
- Roubaix–Lille Métropole
- HP BTP–Auber93

== General classification ==
Final general classification

Rank	Rider	Team	Time
1	Sébastien Delfosse (BEL)	WB Veranclassic Aqua Protect	5h 06' 49"
2	Arthur Vichot (FRA)	FDJ	s.t.
3	Jan Bakelants (BEL)	AG2R La Mondiale	s.t.
4	David Menut (FRA)	HP BTP–Auber93	+ 6"
5	Anthony Maldonado (FRA)	HP BTP–Auber93	s.t.
6	Francesco Gavazzi (ITA)	Androni Giocattoli–Sidermec	s.t.
7	Romain Hardy (FRA)	Fortuneo–Vital Concept	s.t.
8	Jonathan Hivert (FRA)	Direct Énergie	s.t.
9	Samuel Dumoulin (FRA)	AG2R La Mondiale	s.t.
10	Alo Jakin (EST)	HP BTP–Auber93	s.t.
