= Ludovic Robeet =

Belgian cyclist

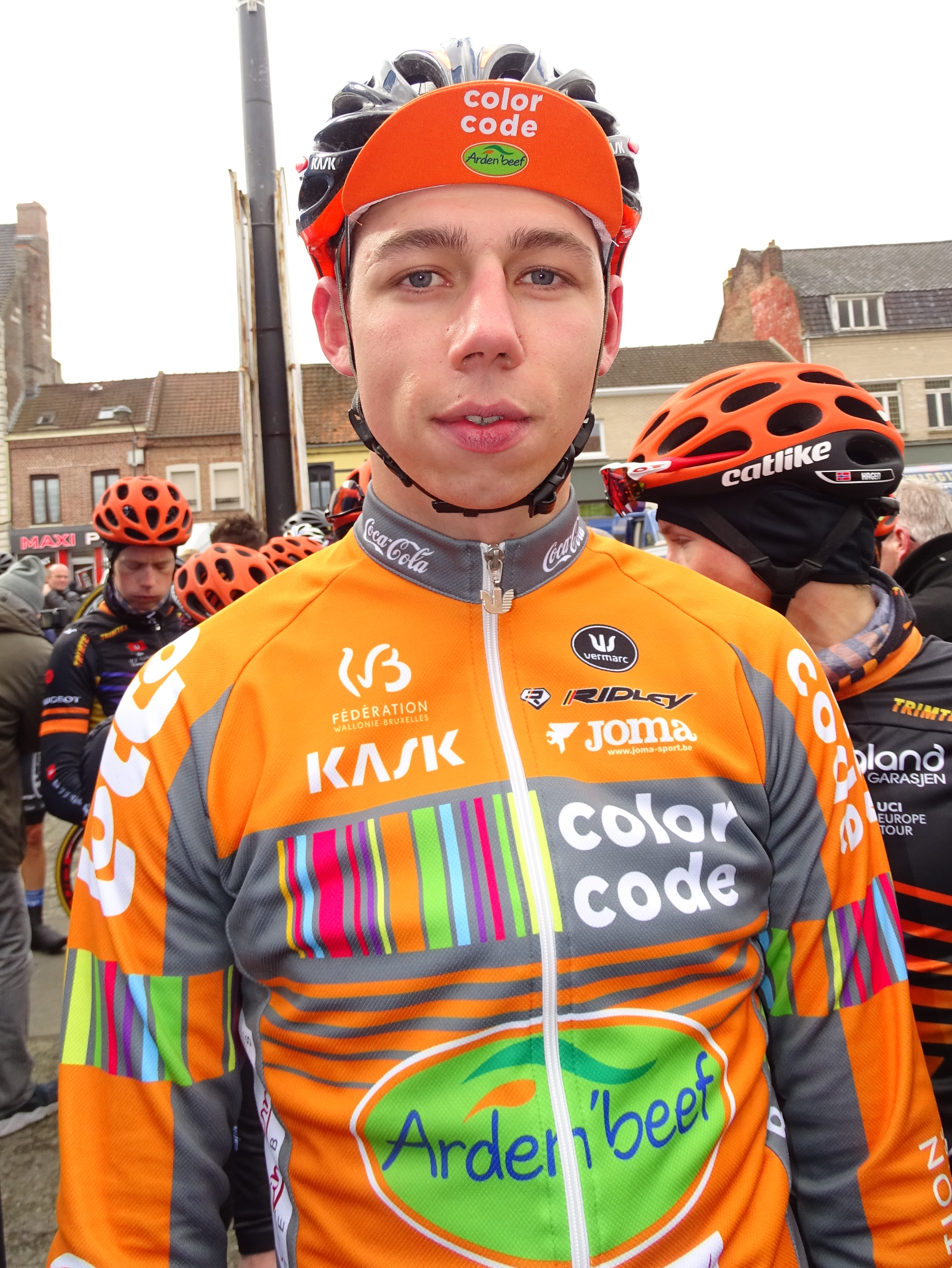
- Robeet in 2016.

Personal information
- Full name: Ludovic Robeet
- Born: 22 May 1994 (age 32) Nivelles, Belgium
- Height: 1.94 m (6 ft 4 in)
- Weight: 75 kg (165 lb)

Cycling career
- Sport: Cycling
- Current team: Cofidis
- Discipline: Road
- Role: Rider

Amateur team
- 2012: UC Seraing Crabbé Performance

Professional teams
- 2013–2016: Color Code–Biowanze
- 2017–2023: WB Veranclassic Aqua Protect
- 2024–: Cofidis

Major wins
- One-day races and Classics Nokere Koerse (2021)

Ludovic Robeet (born 22 May 1994) is a Belgian professional road bicycle racer, who currently rides for UCI WorldTeam Cofidis.

== Career ==
Robeet won the combativity award at stage 2 of the 2016 Tour de Wallonie. He competed in the 2017 Liège–Bastogne–Liège, but did not finish.

== Major results ==
2014
3rd Overall Flèche du Sud
2017
2nd Circuit de Wallonie
2019
1st Stage 4 Settimana Internazionale di Coppi e Bartali
2021
1st Nokere Koerse
