= Olivier Chevalier =

Belgian cyclist

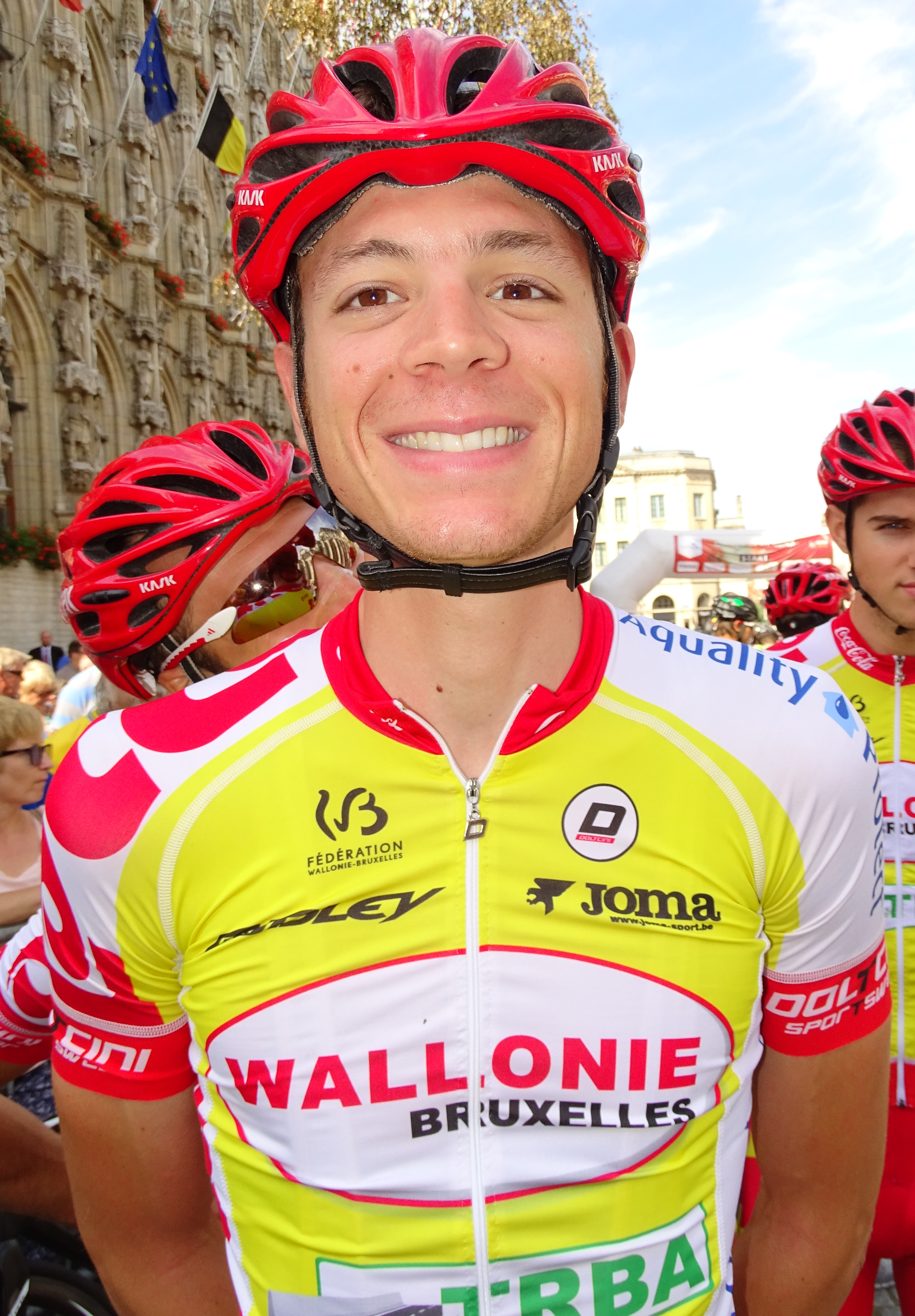
- Chevalier at the 2015 Grote Prijs Jef Scherens

Personal information
- Born: 27 February 1990 (age 36) Mons, Belgium

Cycling career
- Sport: Cycling
- Current team: Retired
- Discipline: Road
- Role: Rider
- Rider type: All-rounder

Professional team
- 2011–2016: Wallonie Bruxelles–Crédit Agricole

Olivier Chevalier (born 27 February 1990) is a Belgian former professional cyclist.

== Major results ==
2011
4th Ronde Pévéloise
2013
1st Ronde van Limburg
7th Overall Tour de Wallonie

1st Young rider classification

2015
6th Overall Paris–Arras Tour
2016
3rd Circuit de Wallonie
