= Antoine Demoitié =

Belgian cyclist

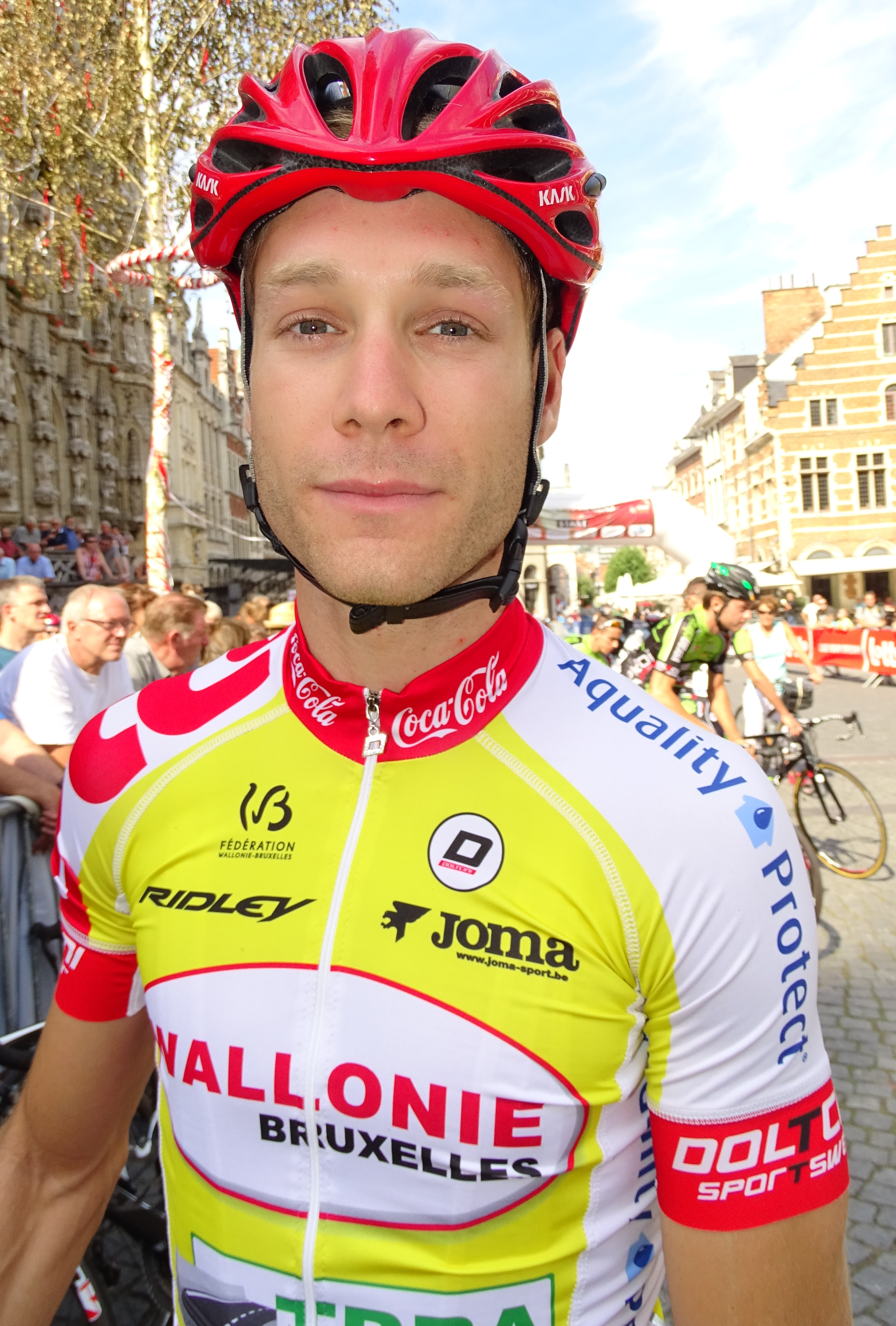
- Demoitié at the Grote Prijs Jef Scherens in Leuven, Belgium, 2015

Personal information
- Full name: Antoine Demoitié
- Born: 16 October 1990 Liège, Wallonia, Belgium
- Died: 27 March 2016 (aged 25) Lille, Hauts-de-France, France

Cycling career
- Sport: Cycling
- Discipline: Road
- Role: Rider

Professional teams
- 2010: Lotto–Bodysol (stagiaire)
- 2011: Lotto–Bodysol–Pôle Continental Wallon
- 2012: Idemasport–Biowanze
- 2013–2015: Wallonie-Bruxelles
- 2016: Wanty–Groupe Gobert

Antoine Demoitié (16 October 1990 – 27 March 2016) was a Belgian cyclist, who rode professionally between 2011 and his death in 2016.

== Death ==
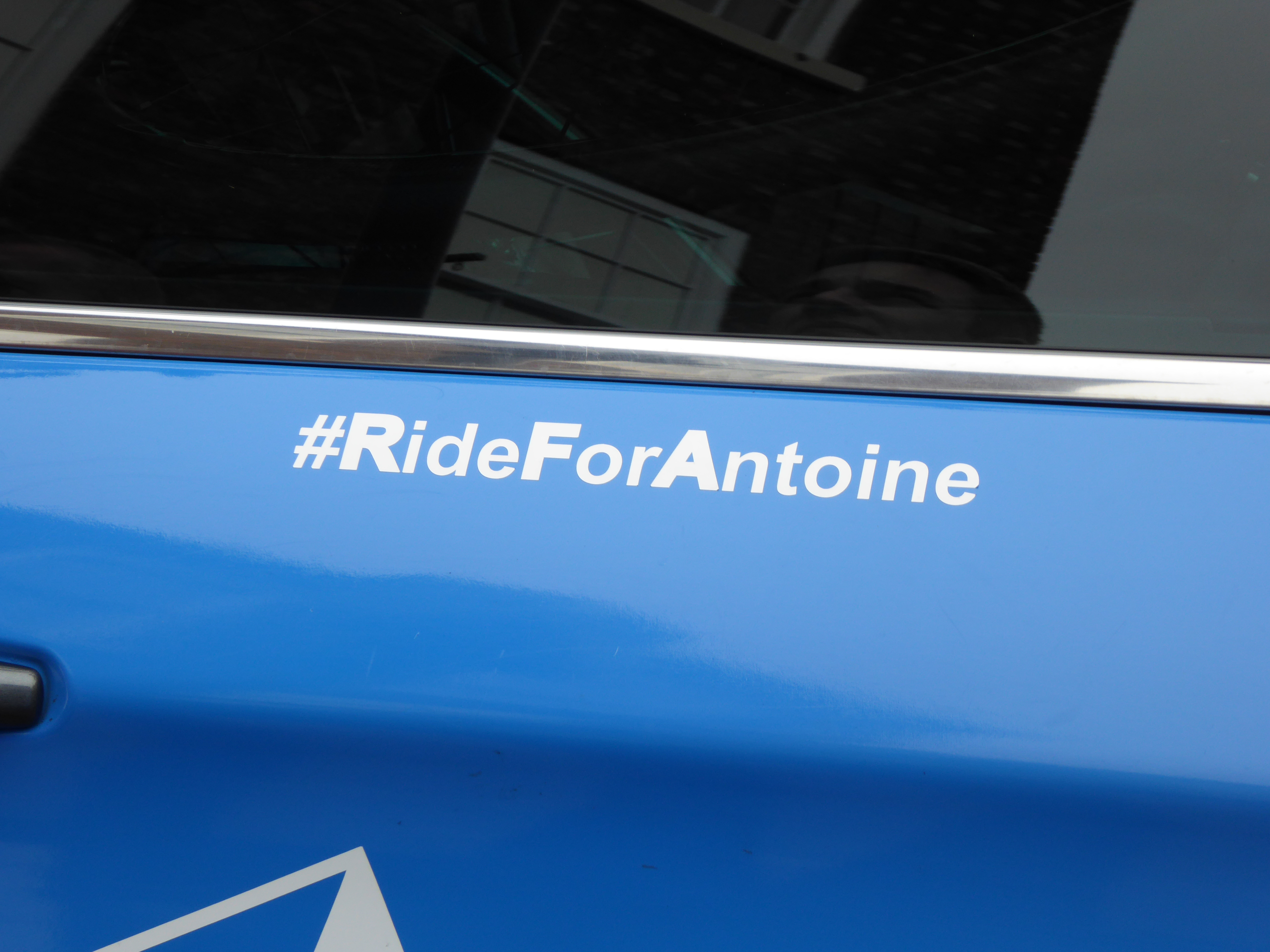
Following Demoitié's death, his Wanty–Groupe Gobert team placed this tribute (pictured at the 2016 Tour of Britain) onto their team vehicles.

At the age of 25, Demoitié crashed on 27 March 2016 when he went down in a pile-up of several cyclists and was then hit by a motorcycle in the Gent–Wevelgem road race. He died that evening in the hospital.

== Major results ==
2012
1st Stage 2b Le Triptyque des Monts et Châteaux
3rd Overall Triptyque Ardennais

1st Stage 3

3rd Gooikse Pijl
5th De Vlaamse Pijl
6th La Côte Picarde
7th Overall Carpathian Couriers Race

1st Stages 2 & 3

9th Memorial Van Coningsloo
2013
2nd Grote Prijs Stad Geel
3rd Ronde Pévéloise
4th Ronde van Noord-Holland
9th Zuid Oost Drenthe Classic I
10th Polynormande
10th Druivenkoers Overijse
2014
1st Tour du Finistère
2nd Omloop van het Waasland
4th Handzame Classic
6th Grand Prix Pino Cerami
7th Grote Prijs Jef Scherens
7th Paris–Bourges
2015
1st Wanzele Koerse
2nd Grote Prijs Stad Zottegem
2nd Handzame Classic
3rd Grand Prix d'Ouverture La Marseillaise
4th Cholet-Pays de Loire
7th Halle–Ingooigem
7th Grand Prix Pino Cerami
9th Omloop van het Waasland
10th Overall Circuit des Ardennes

1st Stage 4

2016
2nd Dorpenomloop Rucphen

== See also ==
- List of professional cyclists who died during a race
