= Laurens De Vreese =

Belgian road racing cyclist (born 1988)

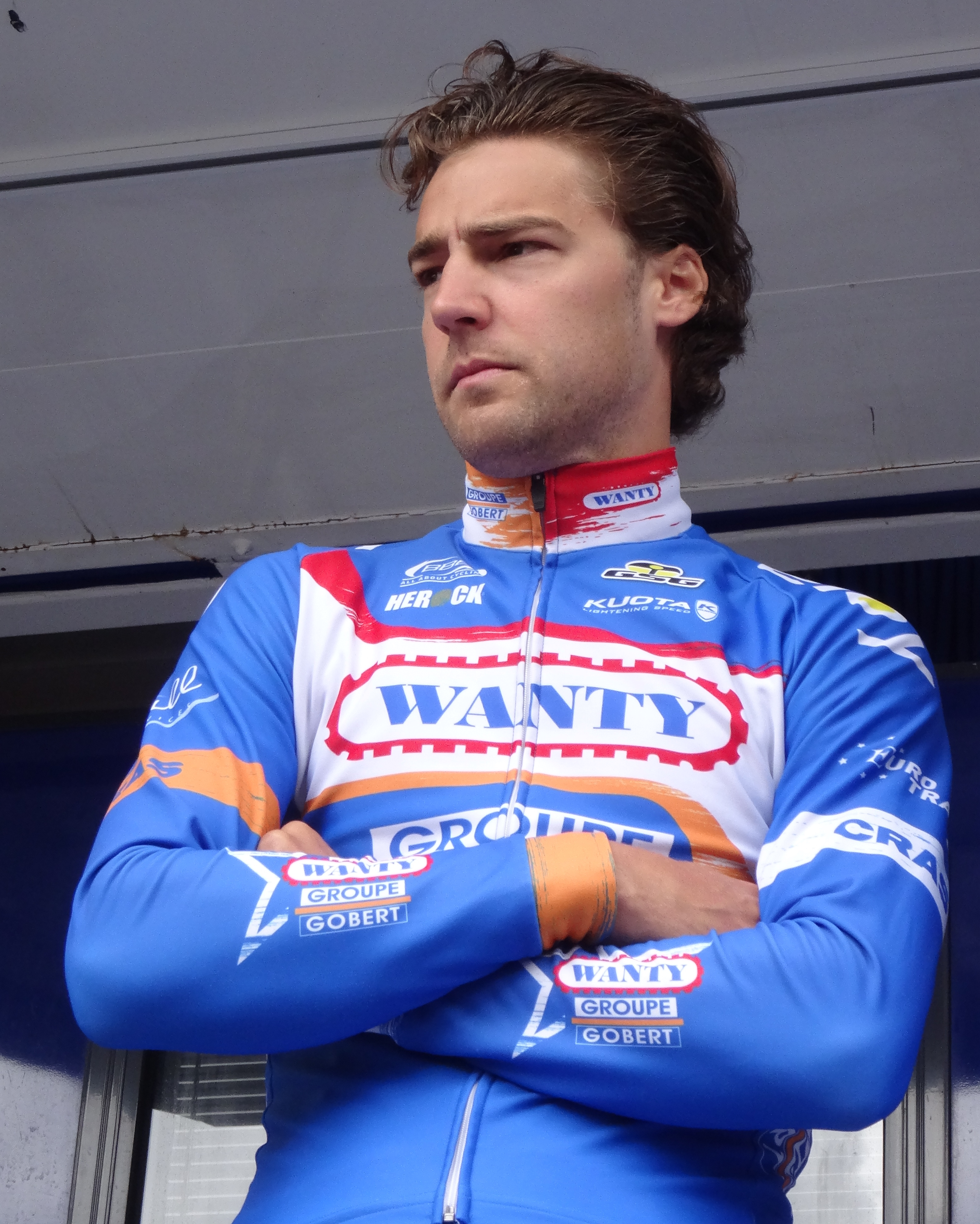
- De Vreese at the 2014 Four Days of Dunkirk

Personal information
- Full name: Laurens De Vreese
- Born: 29 September 1988 (age 38) Aalst, Belgium
- Height: 1.90 m (6 ft 3 in)
- Weight: 76 kg (168 lb; 12.0 st)

Cycling career
- Sport: Cycling
- Current team: Retired
- Discipline: Road
- Role: Rider

Amateur teams
- 2009: Profel Continental Team
- 2010: Beveren 2000

Professional teams
- 2011–2013: Topsport Vlaanderen–Mercator
- 2014: Wanty–Groupe Gobert
- 2015–2020: Astana
- 2021: Alpecin–Fenix

Laurens De Vreese (born 29 September 1988) is a Belgian former professional road bicycle racer who last rode for UCI ProTeam Alpecin–Fenix. De Vreese was the 2010 Belgian national champion for the road race for riders under 23 years of age, winning the title in Hooglede.

== Career ==
Born in Ghent, De Vreese has competed as a professional since the start of the 2011 season, riding as a member of the Topsport Vlaanderen–Mercator squad. At the 2012 running of Liège–Bastogne–Liège, De Vreese was one of a number of riders to be disqualified from the event as a result of taking a short-cut.

De Vreese left Topsport Vlaanderen–Baloise at the end of the 2013 season and joined Wanty–Groupe Gobert for the 2014 season. Subsequently, in August 2014, Astana announced that De Vreese had signed a one-year deal with the squad for 2015. He was named in the startlist for the 2017 Vuelta a España.

== Major results ==
2009
1st Omloop Het Nieuwsblad U23
2nd Flèche Ardennaise
2010
1st Road race, National Under-23 Road Championships
1st Overall Topcompetitie
1st Overall Triptyque Ardennaise
1st Zillebeke–Westouter–Zillebeke
2nd Omloop Het Nieuwsblad U23
3rd Flèche Ardennaise
4th Overall Tour de Liège

1st Stage 4

4th Circuit de Wallonie
5th Heusden Oost-Vlaanderen
7th Road race, UCI Under-23 Road World Championships
10th Grote Prijs Stad Geel
2011
3rd GP Paul Borremans
3rd Heusden Oost-Vlaanderen
5th Halle–Ingooigem
7th GP José Dubois
10th Overall Tour de Wallonie-Picarde
2012
1st Combativity classification Eneco Tour
2nd Paris–Tours
4th GP Wanzele
2013
1st Combativity classification Tour of Belgium
1st Combativity classification Eneco Tour
6th Overall Tour de l'Eurométropole
9th Grand Prix of Aargau Canton
9th Binche–Chimay–Binche
10th Rund um Köln
10th Coppa Bernocchi
2014
3rd Gooikse Pijl
8th Grote Prijs Jef Scherens
2016
8th Overall Danmark Rundt

=== Grand Tour general classification results timeline ===
Grand Tour	2017
Giro d'Italia	—
Tour de France	—
Vuelta a España	122

Legend
—	Did not compete
DNF	Did not finish
