= Sébastien Delfosse =

Belgian road racing cyclist

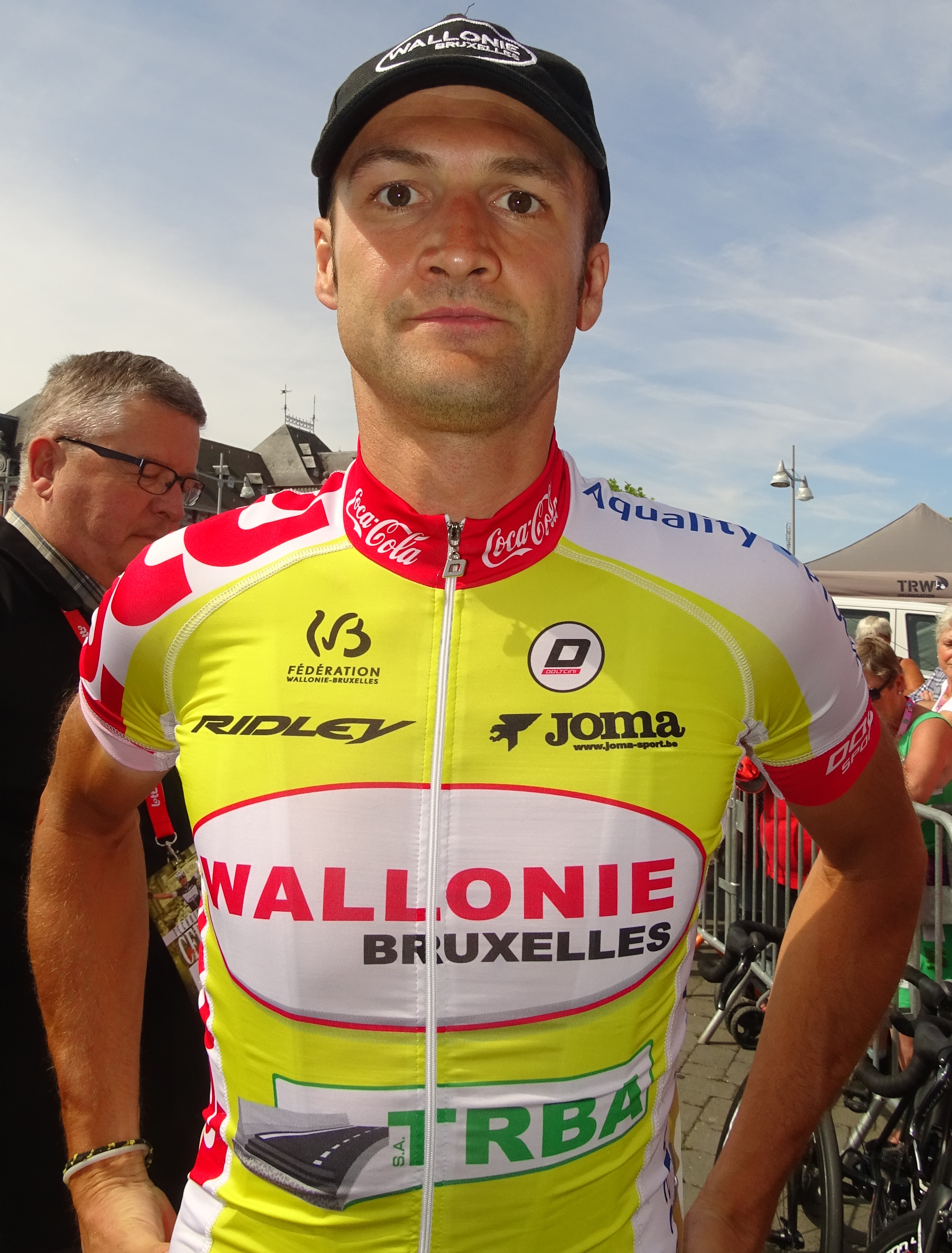
- Delfosse at the 2015 Grand Prix Pino Cerami

Personal information
- Full name: Sébastien Delfosse
- Nickname: Séba
- Born: 29 November 1982 (age 43) Oupeye, Belgium
- Height: 1.85 m (6 ft 1 in)
- Weight: 69 kg (152 lb)

Cycling career
- Sport: Cycling
- Disciplines: Road; Cyclo-cross
- Role: Directeur sportif; Rider (retired)

Amateur teams
- 2005: Massi–Abarth
- 2006–2007: Pôle Continental Wallon–Bergasol–Euro Millions
- 2007: Landbouwkrediet–Tönissteiner (stagiaire)

Professional teams
- 2008–2013: Landbouwkrediet–Tönissteiner
- 2014–2018: Wallonie-Bruxelles

Managerial team
- 2019: Pesant Club Liégeois

Sébastien Delfosse (born 29 November 1982) is a Belgian former professional road bicycle racer, who rode professionally between 2008 and 2018 for the Crelan–Euphony and WB Aqua Protect Veranclassic teams. He has also worked as a directeur sportif for Belgian amateur team Pesant Club Liégeois.

== Career ==
Born in Oupeye and prior to turning professional, Delfosse also competed for the Pôle Continental Wallon–Bodysol–Euromillions team. Having previously taken a podium finish at the 2012 Classic Loire Atlantique, Delfosse achieved his first two professional UCI victories within the space of a week, in May 2013. His first victory came at the Circuit de Wallonie in Lambusart, when he managed to fend off the rest of the field and soloed to victory, having been part of the early breakaway of the race. The following weekend, Delfosse won the 1.1-rated Rund um Köln in Cologne, after again featuring in the race breakaway. Delfosse out-sprinted two other riders for the honours, beating Pieter Jacobs and Georg Preidler at the finish.

Delfosse moved to the Wallonie-Bruxelles team for the 2014 season, after his previous team – Crelan–Euphony – folded.

== Personal life ==
Delfosse's older sister Kathy also competed professionally. Following his retirement from the professional peloton, Delfosse became a salesman at a Decathlon sporting goods store in Verviers.

== Major results ==
2006
7th Overall Le Triptyque des Monts et Châteaux
8th Vlaamse Havenpijl
2007
1st Kattekoers
1st Flèche Ardennaise
3rd Romsée–Stavelot–Romsée
2009
4th Dwars door het Hageland
2010
2nd GP José Dubois
3rd Profkoers Sint-Niklaas
2011
1st GP José Dubois
5th Bolinne–Harlue
7th Heistse Pijl
10th Kattekoers
2012
3rd Classic Loire Atlantique
4th Bolinne–Harlue
7th Overall Tour de Luxembourg
2013
1st Circuit de Wallonie
1st Rund um Köln
3rd Polynormande
7th Heistse Pijl
10th Volta Limburg Classic
2014
2nd La Drôme Classic
2nd Cholet-Pays de Loire
3rd Overall Tour de Bretagne

1st Combination classification

5th Overall Four Days of Dunkirk
5th Polynormande
9th Route Adélie
2015
1st Overall Tour de Bretagne
1st Sprints classification Tour de Wallonie
3rd La Drôme Classic
4th Internationale Wielertrofee Jong Maar Moedig
6th Dwars door de Vlaamse Ardennen
7th Velothon Wales
8th Classic Loire Atlantique
9th Paris–Camembert
2016
7th Overall Tour de Bretagne
10th Circuit de Wallonie
2017
1st La Drôme Classic
