= Beaufays =

Village of Wallonia, Belgium

Coordinates: 50.5594°N 5.6383°E

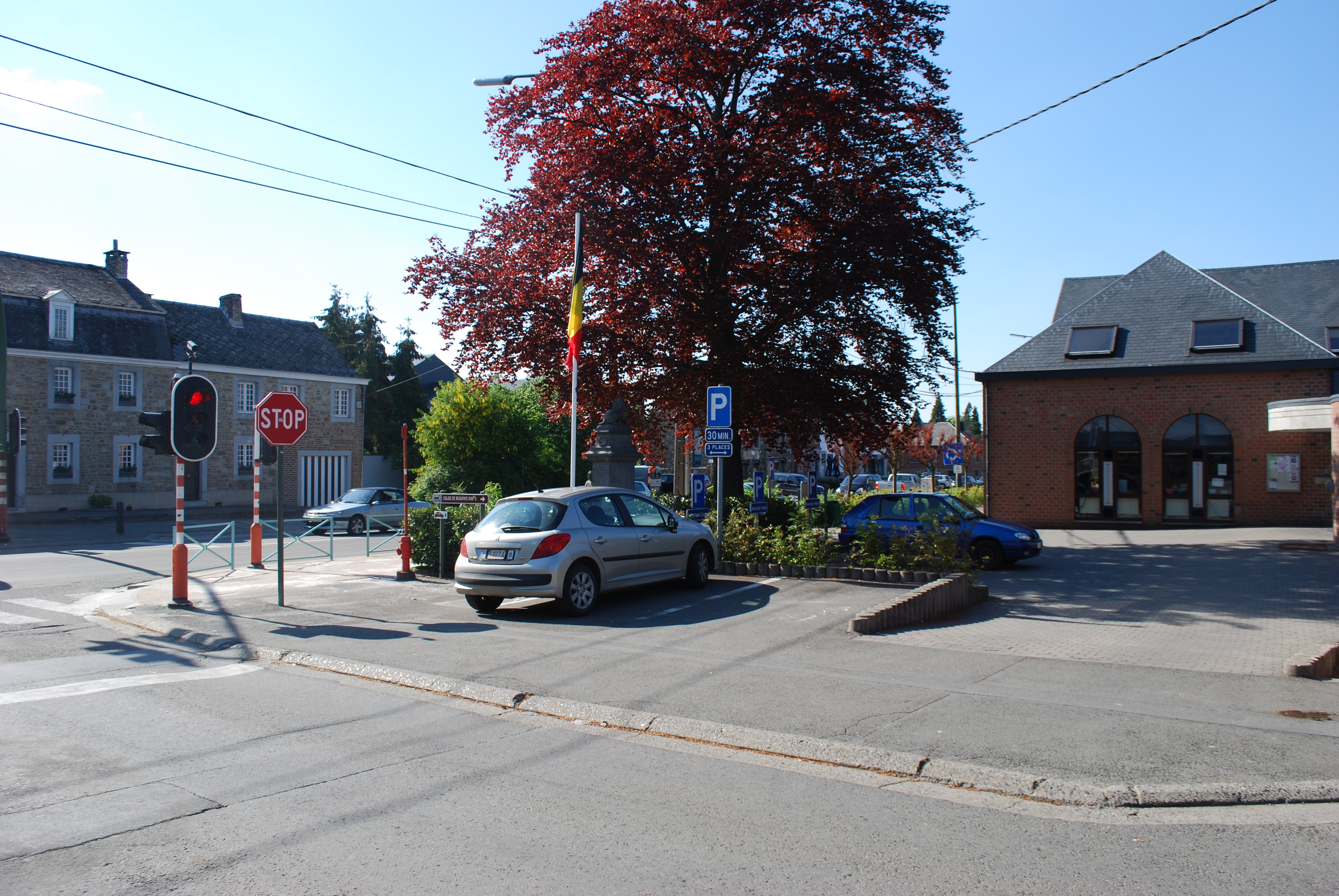
Beaufays

Beaufays (French pronunciation: [bofa(j)i]}; Walloon: Beafayi) is a village of Wallonia and a district of the municipality of Chaudfontaine, located in the province of Liège, Belgium.

Before the municipal consolidations of 1977, it was its own municipality. Its postal code is 4052 and its telephone area code is 04 368.

The public school accommodates about 650 students and 31 classes. The school is known for both academics and for athletics.
