= Christophe Prémont =

Belgian cyclist

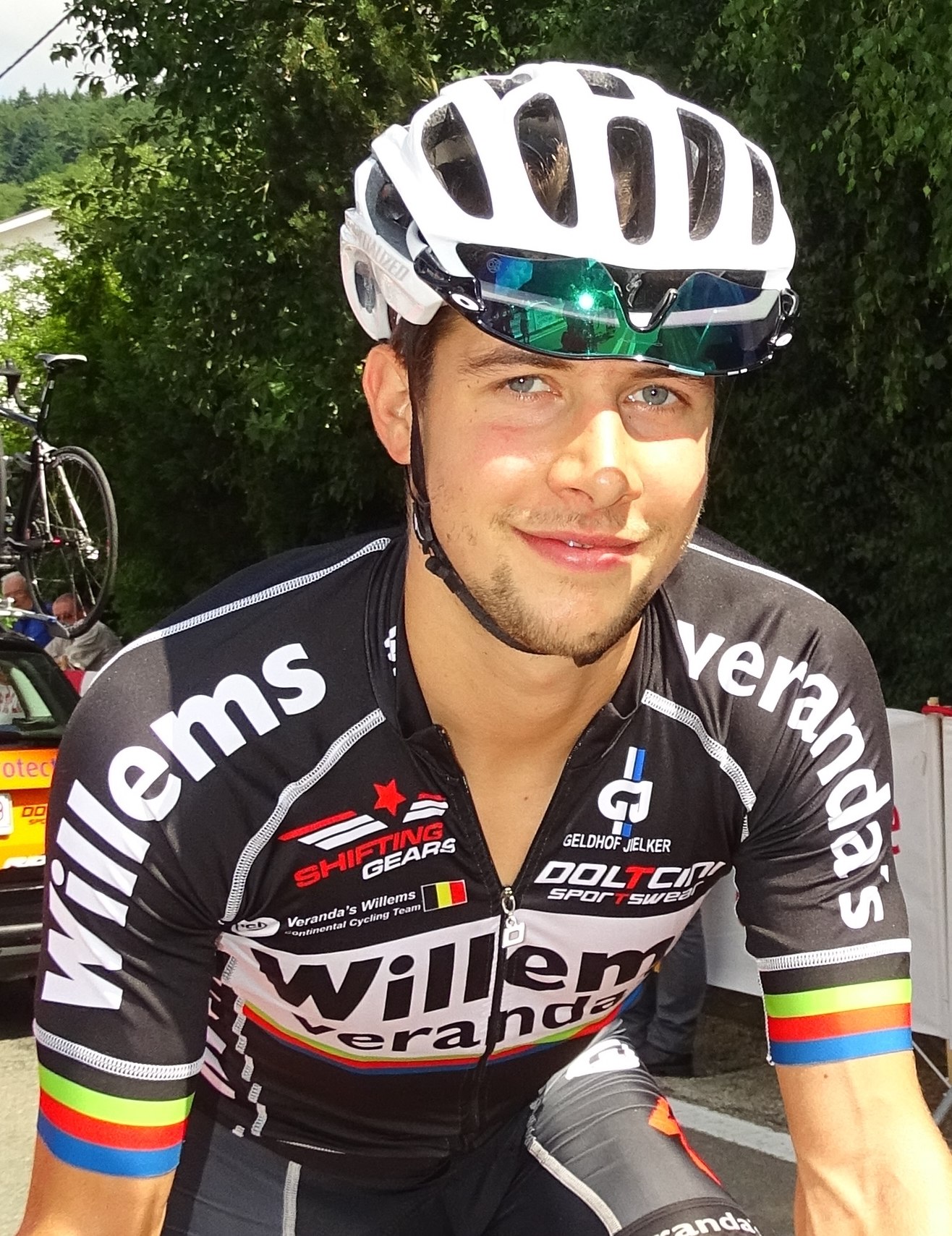
- Prémont in 2015.

Personal information
- Born: 22 November 1989 (age 36) Uccle, Belgium
- Height: 1.78 m (5 ft 10 in)
- Weight: 69 kg (152 lb)

Cycling career
- Sport: Cycling
- Current team: Retired
- Discipline: Road
- Role: Rider

Amateur teams
- 2009: Lotto–Bodysol (stagiaire)
- 2018: DCR Cycling Team

Professional teams
- 2010: Lotto–Bodysol
- 2011–2012: Wallonie Bruxelles–Crédit Agricole
- 2013: Crelan–Euphony
- 2014: Wallonie-Bruxelles
- 2015–2017: Verandas Willems

Christophe Prémont (born 22 November 1989) is a Belgian former professional road cyclist.

== Major results ==
2007
9th Chrono des Nations Juniors
2010
1st Road race, Wallonia Regional Under-23 Road Championships
1st Stage 7 Tour du Faso
2011
1st Road race, Wallonia Regional Road Championships
4th Paris–Tours Espoirs
5th Grote 1-MeiPrijs
2012
1st Grote 1-MeiPrijs
2014
4th Omloop Het Nieuwsblad U23
2015
1st Stage 1 (TTT) Paris–Arras Tour
1st Stage 1 Giro della Regione Friuli Venezia Giulia
3rd Overall Ronde van Midden-Nederland

1st Stage 1 (TTT)

5th Dwars door de Vlaamse Ardennen
2016
9th Duo Normand (with Elias Van Breussegem)
