= Clabecq =

Section of Tubize, Wallonia, Belgium

Coordinates: 50.689634°N 4.221926°E

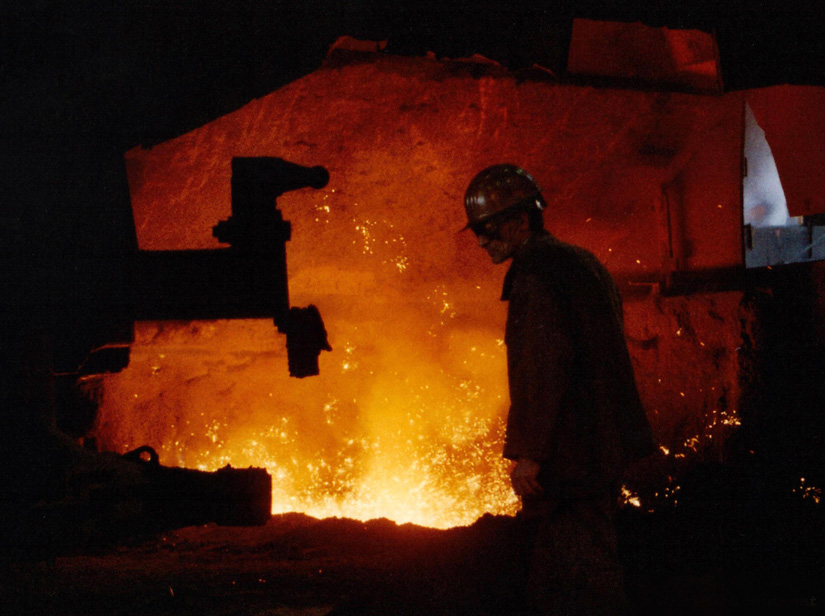
Steel casting in Clabecq

Clabecq (French pronunciation: [klabɛk]; Dutch: Klabbeek; Walloon: Clabek) is a district of the Belgian municipality of Tubize, Wallonia, located in the province of Walloon Brabant.

It was formerly its own municipality until the period of fusion of Belgian municipalities in 1977.

It is traversed by the Brussels-Charleroi Canal, and the steelmaking Forges of Clabecq are situated on its banks.

Its postal code is 1480, formerly 1361.

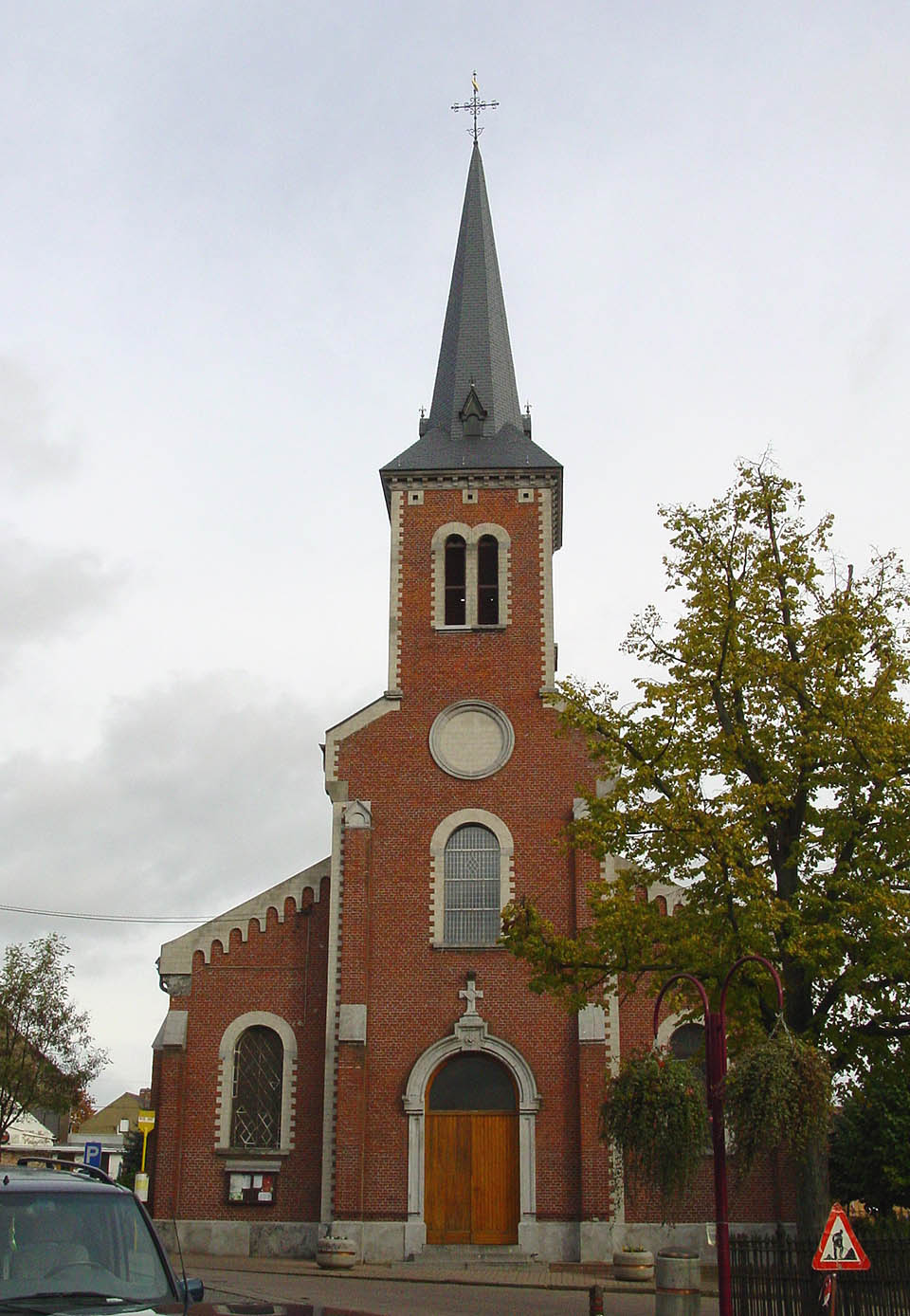
Saint Jean-Baptiste church, Clabecq

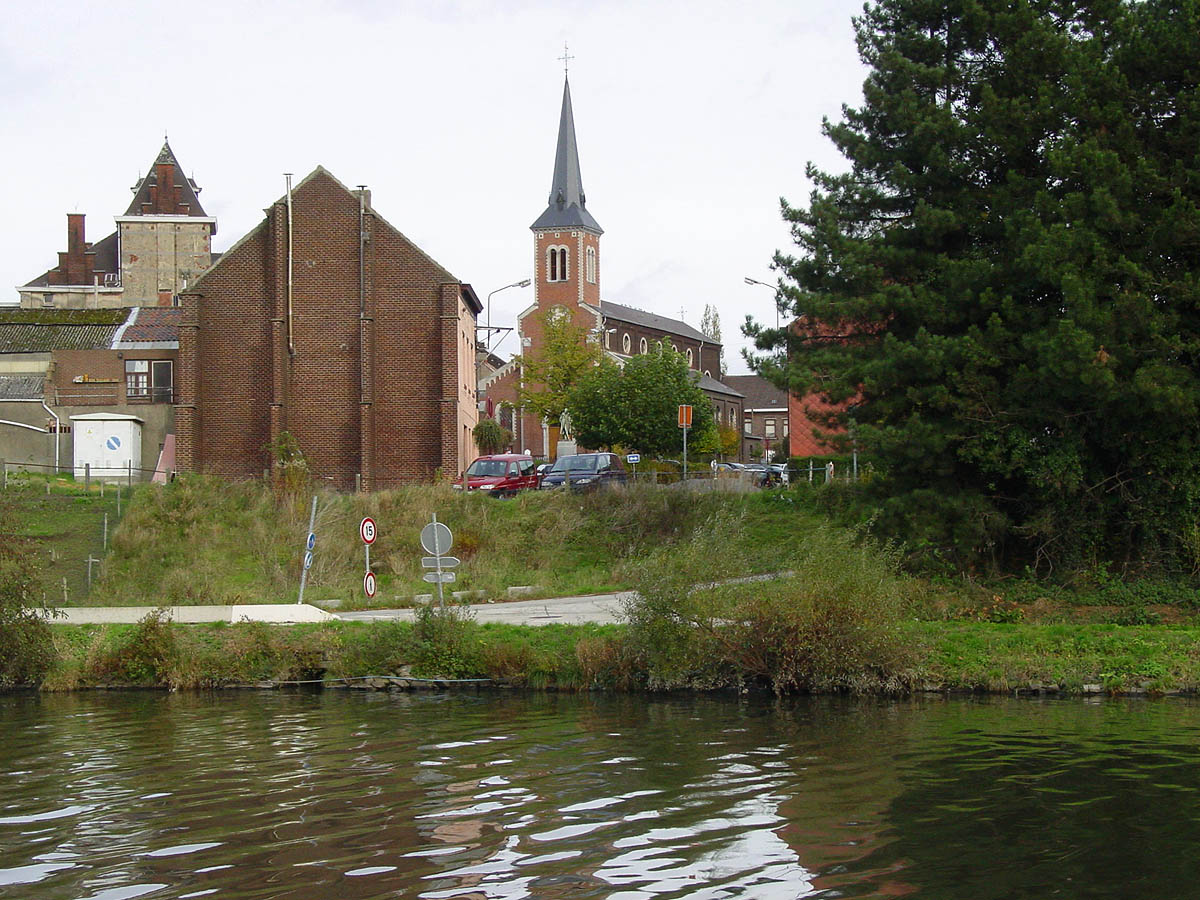
Looking across the canal towards the church
