= Memorial Van Coningsloo =

Belgian one-day road cycling race

Race details
- Date: June
- Region: Flemish Brabant, Flanders, Belgium
- Local name(s): Memorial Van Coningsloo (in Dutch)
- Discipline: Road
- Competition: UCI Europe Tour
- Type: One-day race
- Web site: www.memorial-vanconingsloo.be

History
- First edition: 1993
- Editions: 29 (as of 2023)
- First winner: Gert Van Brabant (BEL)
- Most wins: Gediminas Bagdonas (LTU) (2 wins)
- Most recent: Gianluca Pollefliet (BEL)

The Memorial Van Coningsloo (also named Memorial Philippe Van Coningsloo) is a European single day cycle race held each year with the start in Wavre and finish in Rijmenam. The race was first organized in 1993 to commemorate local amateur cyclist Philippe Van Coningsloo, who suffered a heart attack and died during a cycling race in 1992. As of 2013, the race is organized as a 1.2 event on the UCI Europe Tour.

== Winners ==
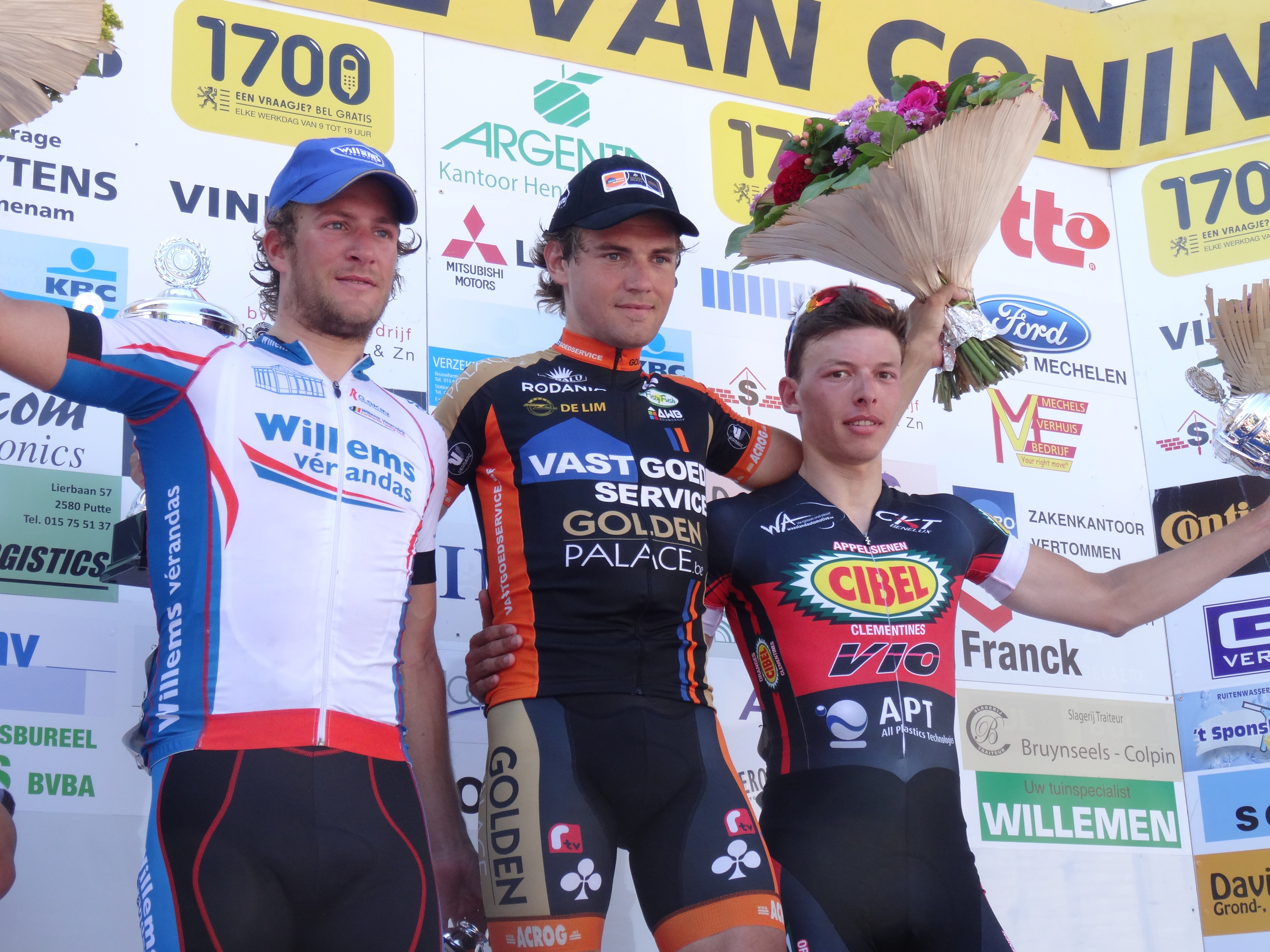
The 2014 podium (from left to right): Nicolas Vereecken (2nd), Rob Ruijgh (1st) and Oliver Naesen (3rd).

| Year | Country | Rider | Team |
|---|---|---|---|
| 1993 | Belgium | Gert Van Brabant | |
| 1994 | Belgium | Koen Heremans | |
| 1995 | Luxembourg | Pascal Triebel | |
| 1996 | Belgium | Romeo Hernandez | |
| 1997 | Belgium | Geert Verdeyen | |
| 1998 | Belgium | Gianni Rivera | |
| 1999 | Lithuania | Raimondas Vilčinskas | |
| 2000 | Belgium | Gert Claes | |
| 2001 | Belgium | David Meys | |
| 2002 | Netherlands | Peter Van Agtmaal | Cycling Team Bert Story–Piels |
| 2003 | Belgium | Frederik Veuchelen | Think Media Cycling |
| 2004 | Belgium | Bart Heirewegh | Team Deschacht–Eddy Merckx |
| 2005 | Netherlands | Hans Dekkers | Rabobank Continental Team |
| 2006 | Belgium | Kevin Maene | Lombarden–Firestone–Middelkerke |
| 2007 | Belgium | Frederiek Nolf | Quick Step–Beveren 2000 |
| 2008 | Belgium | Stijn Joseph | Beveren 2000 |
| 2009 | Lithuania | Gediminas Bagdonas | NH Tielen |
| 2010 | Belgium | Dries Hollanders | PWS Eijssen |
| 2011 | Great Britain | Andrew Fenn | An Post–Sean Kelly |
| 2012 | Lithuania | Gediminas Bagdonas | An Post–Sean Kelly |
| 2013 | New Zealand | Michael Vink | New Zealand (national team) |
| 2014 | Netherlands | Rob Ruijgh | Vastgoedservice–Golden Palace |
| 2015 | Belgium | Robin Stenuit | Veranclassic–Ekoi |
| 2016 | Belgium | Timothy Dupont | Verandas Willems |
| 2017 | Belgium | Yves Coolen | Home Solution–Anmapa–Soenens |
| 2018 | Sweden | Gustav Höög | Team Coop |
| 2019 | Belgium | Gerben Thijssen | Lotto–Soudal |
| 2020– 2021 | No race due to the COVID-19 pandemic in Belgium | | |
| 2022 | Australia | Cameron Scott | ARA Pro Racing Sunshine Coast |
| 2023 | Belgium | Gianluca Pollefliet | Lotto–Dstny Development Team |
