= Grote Prijs Stad Geel =

GP Stad Geel
Race details
- Date: July
- Region: Flanders
- English name: Grand Prix Stad Geel
- Local name(s): Grote Prijs van de Stad Geel
- Discipline: Road
- Competition: UCI Europe Tour
- Type: One-day race

History
- First edition: 1996
- Editions: 18 (as of 2013)
- Final edition: 2013
- First winner: Geert Omloop (BEL)
- Most wins: No repeat winners
- Final winner: Yves Lampaert (BEL)

The Grote Prijs Stad Geel was a one-day road cycling race held annually in the province of Antwerp, Belgium. It was organized by the municipality of Geel. It was part of the UCI Europe Tour in category 1.2 from 2010 until its final edition in 2013.

== Winners ==
Year	Winner	Second	Third
1996	(Belgium) Geert Omloop	(Netherlands) Christian Van Dartel	(Belgium) Davy Baptist
1997	(Australia) Mathew Hayman	(Netherlands) Daniël van Elven	(Sweden) Mikael Wranqvist
1998	(Belgium) Andy Vidts	(Belgium) Sven Nys	(Belgium) Björn Leukemans
1999	(Belgium) Peter Lernout	(Luxembourg) Max Becker	(Netherlands) Marc Vlijm
2000	(Belgium) Tom Boonen	(Belgium) Kevin Proost	(Belgium) Andy Cappelle
2001	(Belgium) Ruud Verbakel	(Belgium) Jeroen Goffin	(Netherlands) Marco Bos
2002	(Belgium) Wouter Van Mechelen	(Belgium) Pieter Ghyllebert	(Belgium) Gert Steegmans
2003	(Belgium) Steven Caethoven	(Belgium) Dwight Desaever	(Netherlands) Kor Steenbergen
2004	(Belgium) Steven Vanden Bussche	(Netherlands) Rik Kavsek	(France) Romain Fondard
2005	(Belgium) Kevin Neirynck	(Belgium) Kevin Van Den Eeckhout	(Belgium) Evert Verbist
2006	(Belgium) Kevin Van Den Eeckhout	(Belgium) Frank Van Kuik	(Belgium) Jurgen François
2007	(Lithuania) Gediminas Bagdonas	(Lithuania) Aidis Kruopis	(Belgium) Maxime Vantomme
2008	(Belgium) Joeri Clauwaert	(Belgium) Bjorn Coomans	(Belgium) Dieter Cappelle
2009	(Belgium) Jens Keukeleire	(Belgium) Gregory Joseph	(Belgium) Joeri Clauwaert
2010	(Belgium) Timothy Dupont	(Belgium) Bjorn Meersmans	(Republic of Ireland) Matthew Brammeier
2011	(Republic of Ireland) Sam Bennett	(Belgium) Jonas Van Genechten	(Belgium) Dries Depoorter
2012	(Belgium) Tom Van Asbroeck	(Belgium) Michael Van Staeyen	(Belgium) Benjamin Verraes
2013	(Belgium) Yves Lampaert	(Belgium) Antoine Demoitié	(Belgium) Tom Devriendt
