= Veranclassic–Ago =

Belgian cycling team

Veranclassic-Ago
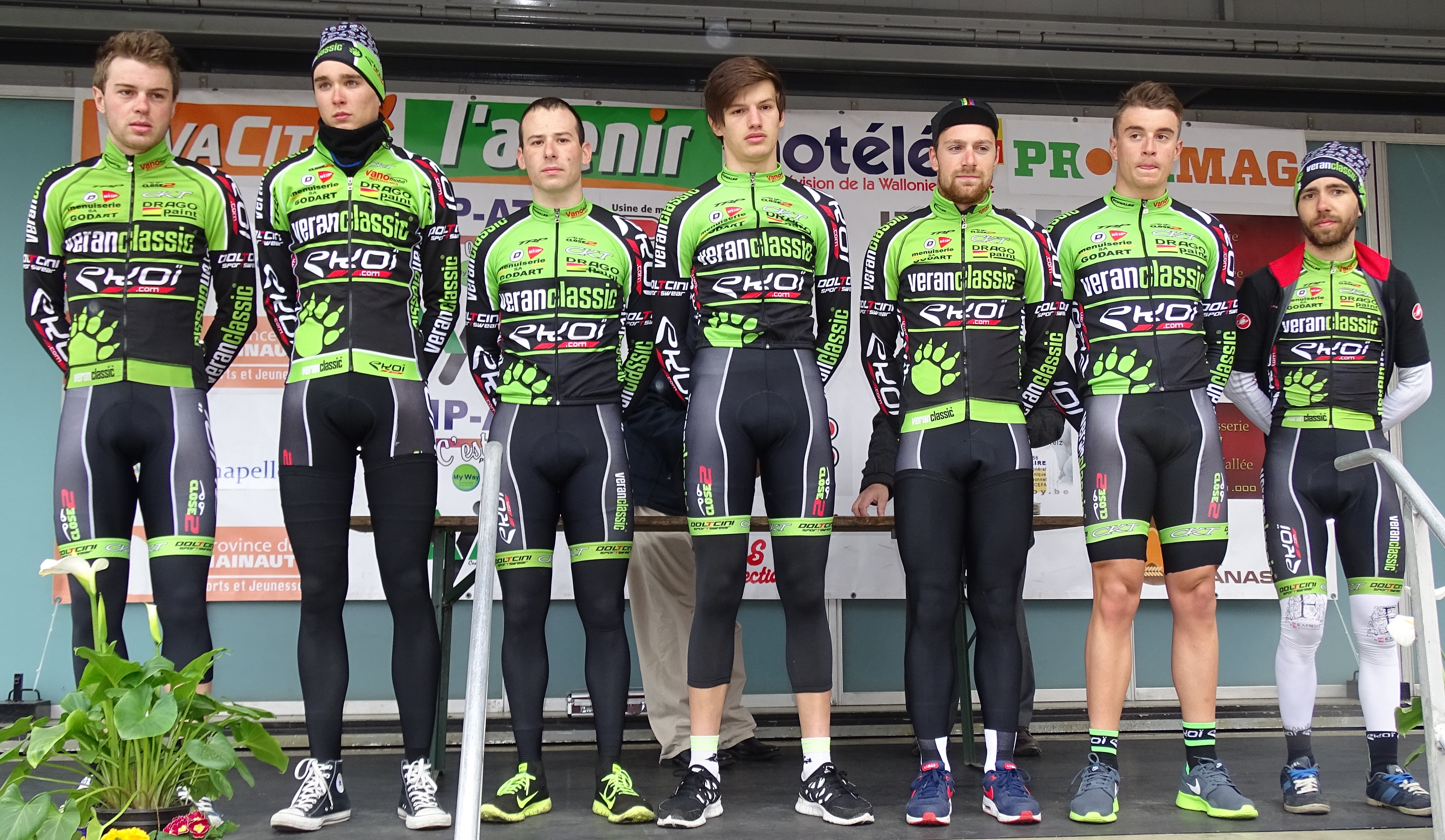

Team information
- Registered: Belgium
- Founded: 2013
- Disbanded: 2016
- Discipline: Road
- Status: UCI Continental

Team name history
- 2013 2014 2015 2016: Doltcini Flanders; Veranclassic–Doltcini; Veranclassic–Ekoi; Veranclassic–Ago
Veranclassic–Ago jersey
Jersey

Veranclassic–Ago is a UCI Continental team founded in 2013 and based in Belgium. It participates in UCI Continental Circuits races.

The team disbanded at the end of the 2016 season.

== Major wins ==
2015
Stage 5 Tour du Maroc, Justin Jules
Grand Prix de la ville de Nogent-sur-Oise, Robin Stenuit
Stage 1 Tour de Gironde, Robin Stenuit
Memorial Van Coningsloo, Robin Stenuit
2016
Stage 8 Tour du Maroc, Justin Jules
Stage 2 Tour de Tunisie, Justin Jules
Stage 4 Tour de Tunisie, Matthias Legley
Grote Prijs Stad Sint-Niklaas, Justin Jules
