= T.Palm–Pôle Continental Wallon =

European cycling team

T.Palm–
Team information
- UCI code: PCW
- Registered: Belgium
- Founded: 2006
- Disbanded: 2018
- Discipline: Road
- Status: UCI Continental

Team name history
- 2006 2007 2008 2009–2010 2011 2012–2018: –Bergasol–Euro Millions –Bodysol–Euromillions; Bodysol–Euromillions– Lotto–Bodysol; Lotto–Bodysol– T.Palm–
T.Palm–Pôle Continental Wallon jersey
Jersey

T.Palm– was a UCI Continental team founded in 2006 and based in Belgium. It participated in UCI Continental Circuits races.

== Team roster ==
Rider	Date of birth
Hampus Anderberg (SWE)	25 May 1996 (age 30)
Andreas Andersson (SWE)	October 8, 1999 (age 26)
Sébastien Carabin (BEL)	28 March 1989 (age 37)
Michael Cools (BEL)	12 September 1994 (age 31)
Ugo D'Angelo (BEL)	October 15, 1998 (age 27)
Vincent De Sy (BEL)	23 October 1995 (age 30)
Jelle De Ville (BEL)	10 July 1995 (age 31)
Merlijn Decoster (BEL)	11 November 1994 (age 31)
William Elliott (CAN)	4 April 1995 (age 31)
Guillaume Haag (BEL)	9 November 1989 (age 36)

Rider	Date of birth
Max Emil Kørner (NOR)	3 June 1991 (age 35)
Ross Lamb (GBR)	12 October 1995 (age 30)
Adam Lewis (GBR)	21 August 1995 (age 31)
Arthur Pagnaer (BEL)	25 April 1995 (age 31)
Thomas Petit (BEL)	7 November 1996 (age 29)
Yorick Slagmulders (BEL)	29 August 1995 (age 31)
Edward Walsh (CAN)	22 November 1996 (age 29)

== Major wins ==
2009
Prologue Tour of Wellington, Ryan Wills
Stage 10 Tour du Faso, Jeremy Burton
Stage 9 Tour of Southland, Romain Fondard
2010
Stages 3 Tour du Faso, Jeremy Burton
Stage 7 Tour du Faso, Christophe Prémont
2012
Grand Prix Criquielion, Tom David
