= Wagner Bazin WB =

Belgian cycling team

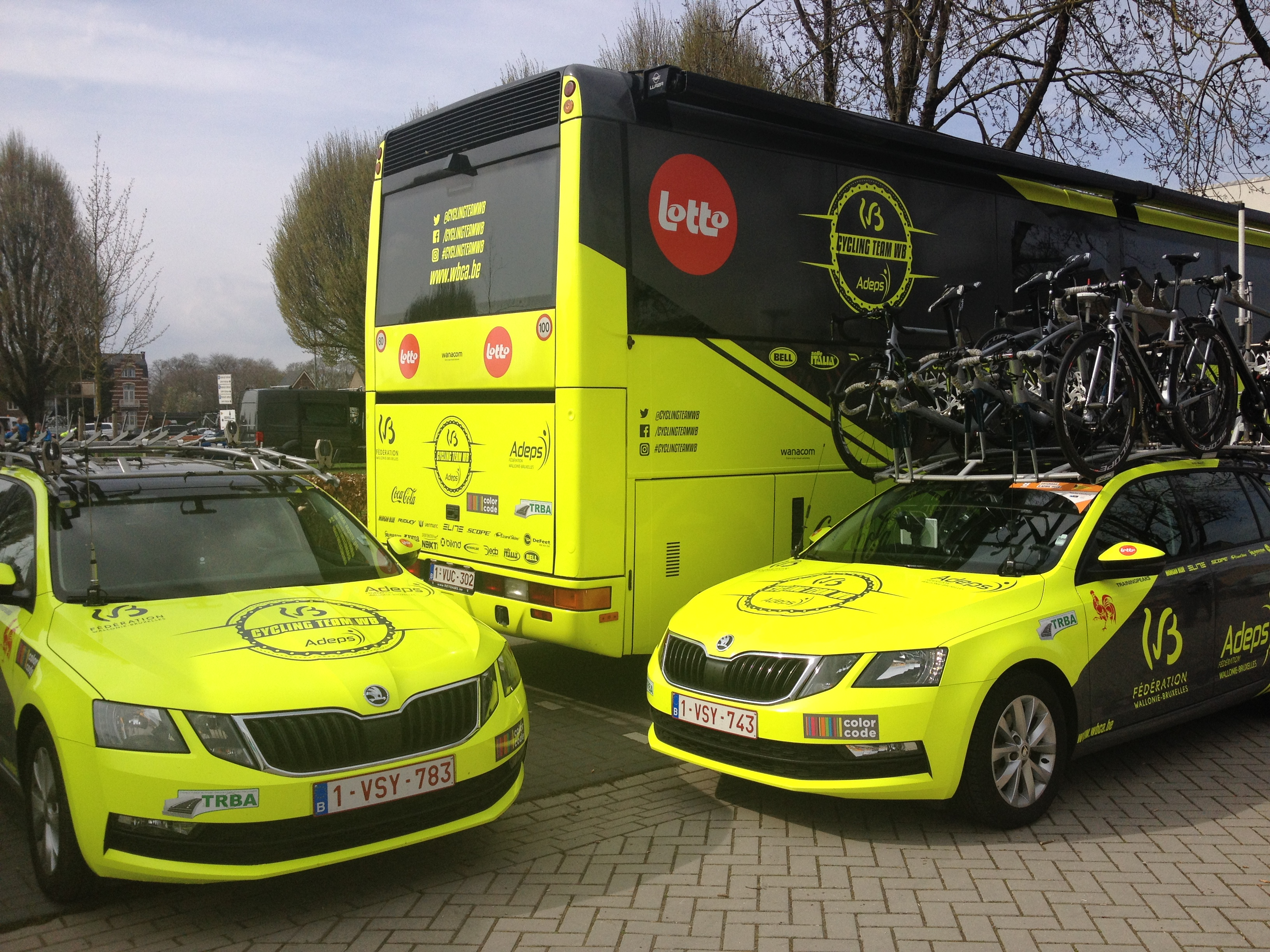
- Team vehicles at the 2019 Volta Limburg Classic

Team information
- UCI code: WB2
- Registered: Belgium
- Founded: 2011
- Disbanded: 2025
- Discipline: Road
- Status: UCI Continental (2011–2016); UCI Professional Continental/ProTeam (2017–2025)
- Bicycles: De Rosa

Team name history
- 2011–2012 2013–2015 2016 2017 2018 2019 2020 2021 2021–2022 2023–2024 2025: Wallonie Bruxelles–Crédit Agricole; Wallonie–Bruxelles; Wallonie Bruxelles–Group Protect; WB Veranclassic Aqua Protect; WB Aqua Protect Veranclassic; Wallonie Bruxelles; Bingoal–Wallonie Bruxelles; Bingoal WB; Bingoal Pauwels Sauces WB; Bingoal WB; Wagner Bazin WB
Wagner Bazin WB jersey
Jersey

Wagner Bazin WB was a UCI ProTeam founded in 2011 and based in Belgium. It participates in UCI Continental Circuits races. The team merged with Belgian UCI Continental team Philippe Wagner–Bazin before the 2025 season.

The team folded at the end of 2025 as its primary sponsor, Philippe Wagner ended its support for the team, and the failure to get replacement sponsorship.

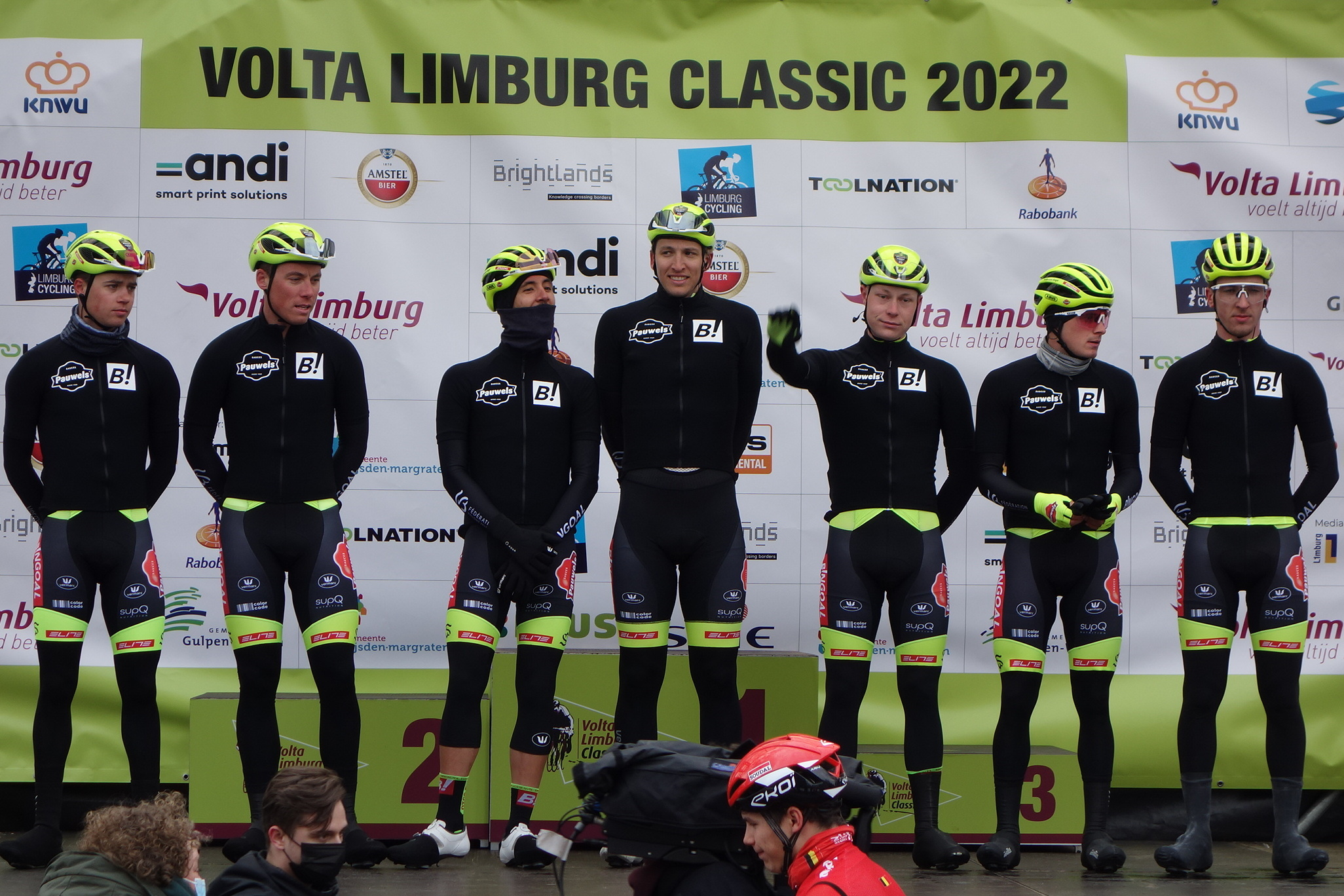
The team in 2022

== Team roster ==
As of 26 January 2025.

Rider	Date of birth
Jocelyn Baguelin (FRA)	20 May 1999 (age 27)
Pierre Barbier (FRA)	25 September 1997 (age 28)
Quentin Bezza (FRA)	24 March 1998 (age 28)
Luca De Meester (BEL)	22 January 2000 (age 26)
Floris De Tier (BEL)	20 January 1992 (age 34)
Cériel Desal (BEL)	20 October 1999 (age 26)
Michiel Lambrecht (BEL)	10 February 2003 (age 23)
Louka Matthys (BEL)	31 December 1999 (age 26)
Johan Meens (BEL)	7 July 1999 (age 27)
Victor Papon (FRA)	25 January 2001 (age 25)
Davide Persico (ITA)	1 April 2001 (age 25)

Rider	Date of birth
Tom Portsmouth (GBR)	19 December 2001 (age 24)
Henri-François Renard-Haquin (FRA)	12 December 2002 (age 23)
Jens Reynders (BEL)	25 May 1998 (age 28)
Marco Tizza (ITA)	6 February 1992 (age 34)
Leander Van Hautegem (BEL)	9 March 2003 (age 23)
Axandre Van Petegem (BEL)	13 January 2002 (age 24)
Kenneth Van Rooy (BEL)	8 October 1993 (age 32)
Jelle Vermoote (BEL)	29 August 2001 (age 25)
Giacomo Villa (ITA)	29 January 2002 (age 24)
Loïc Vliegen (BEL)	29 December 1993 (age 32)
Sasha Weemaes (BEL)	9 February 1998 (age 28)

== Major wins ==
2011
Kattekoers, Jonas van Genechten
Zellik–Galmaarden, Gaëtan Bille
Stage 2 Rhône-Alpes Isère Tour, Gaëtan Bille
Stage 3 Ronde de l'Oise, Gaëtan Bille
2012
Zellik–Galmaarden, Kevin Thomé
Grote 1-MeiPrijs, Christophe Prémont
2013
Ronde van Limburg, Olivier Chevalier
Stage 3b Tour of Szeklerland, Fabio Polazzi
2014
Tour du Finistère, Antoine Demoitié
2015
Stage 4 Circuit des Ardennes, Antoine Demoitié
Overall Tour de Bretagne, Sébastien Delfosse
2016
Overall Istrian Spring Trophy, Olivier Pardini
Overall Tour de Normandie, Baptiste Planckaert

Stage 2, Olivier Pardini
Stage 5, Baptiste Planckaert

Overall Circuit des Ardennes, Olivier Pardini

Stage 3, Olivier Pardini

Tour du Finistère, Baptiste Planckaert
Polynormande, Baptiste Planckaert
Stage 4 Czech Cycling Tour, Baptiste Planckaert
2017
Stage 1 Tour La Provence, Justin Jules
La Drôme Classic, Sébastien Delfosse
Stage 4 Tour de Normandie, Justin Jules
Stage 1 Circuit de la Sarthe, Justin Jules
Stage 3 Circuit des Ardennes, Maxime Vantomme
Grand Prix de la ville de Pérenchies, Roy Jans
2018
Grand Prix de Denain, Kenny Dehaes
Stage 1 Circuit de la Sarthe, Justin Jules
Grand Prix de la ville de Pérenchies, Kenny Dehaes
2019
Stage 1a Settimana Internazionale di Coppi e Bartali, Emīls Liepiņš
Stage 4 Settimana Internazionale di Coppi e Bartali, Ludovic Robeet
Stage 1 Vuelta a Aragón, Justin Jules
Rund um Köln, Baptiste Planckaert
2021
Stage 2 Étoile de Bessèges, Timothy Dupont
Nokere Koerse, Ludovic Robeet
Stage 3 CRO Race, Milan Menten
2022
Grand Prix de la Ville de Lillers, Milan Menten
Stage 4 ZLM Tour, Timothy Dupont
2023
Stage 6 La Tropicale Amissa Bongo, Karl Patrick Lauk
Stage 7 La Tropicale Amissa Bongo, Alexander Salby
Stage 4 Settimana Internazionale di Coppi e Bartali, Alexis Guérin
Estonia National Road Race Championships, Karl Patrick Lauk
2024
Stage 5 ZLM Tour, Alexander Salby
Stage 6 Tour of Qinghai Lake, Davide Persico
2025
Stage 3 (ITT) Tour of Sharjah, Quentin Bezza

=== Supplementary statistics ===
Grand Tours by highest finishing position
Race	2017	2018	2019	2020	2021	2022	2023	2024	2025
Giro d'Italia	–	–	–	–	–	–	–	–	–
Tour de France	–	–	–	–	–	–	–	–	–
Vuelta a España	–	–	–	–	–	–	–	–	–
Major week-long stage races by highest finishing position
Race	2017	2018	2019	2020	2021	2022	2023	2024	2025
Tour Down Under	–	–	–	–	NH		–	–	–
Paris–Nice	–	–	–	–	–	–	–	–	–
Tirreno–Adriatico	–	–	–	–	–	–	–	–	–
Volta a Catalunya	–	–	–	NH	–	–	–	–	–
Tour of the Basque Country	–	–	–	NH	–	–	–	–	–
Tour de Romandie	–	–	–	NH	–	–	–	–	–
Critérium du Dauphiné	–	–	–	–	–	–	–	–	–
Tour de Suisse	–	–	–	NH	–	–	–	–	–
Tour de Pologne	–	–	–	–	–	–	–	–	–
BinckBank Tour	–	46	77	52	48	NH	44	43	43
Monuments by highest finishing position
Monument	2017	2018	2019	2020	2021	2022	2023	2024	2025
Milan–San Remo	–	–	–	–	–	–	–	–	–
Tour of Flanders	–	69	–	29	31	32	47	55	86
Paris–Roubaix	–	56	–	NH	21	32	39	78	–
Liège–Bastogne–Liège	96	87	42	23	46	48	34	74	60
Il Lombardia	–	–	–	–	–	–	–	–	–
Classics by highest finishing position
Classic	2017	2018	2019	2020	2021	2022	2023	2024	2025
Omloop Het Nieuwsblad	23	35	24	DNF	43	29	60	51	–
Kuurne–Brussels–Kuurne	30	5	–	36	19	18	55	30	50
Strade Bianche	–	–	–	–	–	–	–	–	–
E3 Harelbeke	52	28	24	NH	36	34	35	57	–
Gent–Wevelgem	11	29	47	77	42	16	65	–	–
Amstel Gold Race	–	–	–	NH	46	57	–	–	–
La Flèche Wallonne	56	106	35	12	43	76	66	28	65
Clásica de San Sebastián	–	–	–	NH	–	–	–	–	–
Paris–Tours	30	DNS	9	14	39	68	16	71	–

Legend
—	Did not compete
DNS	Did not start
DNF	Did not finish
NH	Not held
