= 2011 Team RadioShack season =

2011 Team RadioShack season
Manager	Johan Bruyneel
One-day victories	2
Stage race overall victories	10
Stage race stage victories	16
Previous season

The 2011 season for Team RadioShack began in January at the Tour Down Under and ended in October with Robbie McEwen's participation in the Noosa Grand Prix. As a UCI ProTeam, they were automatically invited and obligated to send a squad to every event in the UCI World Tour.

The team merged with Leopard Trek for the 2012 season, with the resultant team based in Luxembourg, meaning this formation is considered defunct after the 2011 season.

While the team had 28 wins in 2011, and showed well enough to briefly be the leading team in the UCI World Tour rankings, they were nearly invisible in the Grand Tours, the races which have defined manager Johan Bruyneel's managerial career. A Tour de France besieged by crashes and injuries led to Haimar Zubeldia in 15th place being their best finisher, the worst showing for a Bruyneel-led team at the Tour in five years. The team's principal successes were the three major stage races in the United States, the Tour of California, the Tour of Utah, and the USA Pro Cycling Challenge. Team RadioShack fielded the overall winner in all three events, Chris Horner in California and Levi Leipheimer in Utah and Colorado. The team also won seven other stage races, easily the most of any major team on the season.

== 2011 roster ==
Ages as of January 1, 2011.

Rider	Date of birth
Lance Armstrong (Note: Armstrong retired from the sport on February 16) (USA)	September 18, 1971 (aged 39)
George Bennett (Note: Rider joined the team on August 1 as a stagiaire.) (NZL)	April 7, 1990 (aged 20)
Fumiyuki Beppu (JPN)	April 10, 1983 (aged 27)
Sam Bewley (NZL)	July 22, 1987 (aged 23)
Janez Brajkovič (SLO)	December 18, 1983 (aged 27)
Matthew Busche (USA)	May 9, 1985 (aged 25)
Manuel Cardoso (POR)	April 7, 1983 (aged 27)
Philip Deignan (IRE)	September 7, 1983 (aged 27)
Ben Hermans (BEL)	June 8, 1986 (aged 24)
Chris Horner (USA)	November 10, 1971 (aged 39)
Robert Hunter (RSA)	April 22, 1977 (aged 33)
Ben King (USA)	March 22, 1989 (aged 21)
Andreas Klöden (GER)	June 22, 1975 (aged 35)
Michał Kwiatkowski (POL)	June 2, 1990 (aged 20)
Markel Irizar (ESP)	February 5, 1980 (aged 30)
Levi Leipheimer (USA)	October 24, 1973 (aged 37)

Rider	Date of birth
Geoffroy Lequatre (FRA)	June 30, 1981 (aged 29)
Tiago Machado (POR)	October 18, 1985 (aged 25)
Jason McCartney (USA)	September 3, 1973 (aged 37)
Robbie McEwen (AUS)	June 24, 1972 (aged 38)
Dmitriy Muravyev (KAZ)	November 2, 1979 (aged 31)
Nelson Oliveira (POR)	March 6, 1989 (aged 21)
Dale Parker (AUS)	May 12, 1992 (aged 18)
Sérgio Paulinho (POR)	March 26, 1980 (aged 30)
Yaroslav Popovych (UKR)	January 4, 1980 (aged 30)
Grégory Rast (SUI)	January 17, 1980 (aged 30)
Sébastien Rosseler (BEL)	July 15, 1981 (aged 29)
Ivan Rovny (RUS)	September 30, 1987 (aged 23)
Bjørn Selander (USA)	January 28, 1988 (aged 22)
Jesse Sergent (NZL)	July 8, 1988 (aged 22)
Evgeny Shalunov (RUS)	January 8, 1992 (aged 18)
Haimar Zubeldia (ESP)	April 1, 1977 (aged 33)

Riders who joined the team for the 2011 season

Rider	2010 team
Manuel Cardoso	Footon–Servetto–Fuji
Philip Deignan	Cervélo TestTeam
Robert Hunter	Garmin–Transitions
Michał Kwiatkowski	neo-pro
Robbie McEwen	Team Katusha
Nelson Oliveira	Xacobeo–Galicia
Jesse Sergent	stagiaire (Team RadioShack)

Riders who left the team during or after the 2010 season

Rider	2011 team
Daryl Impey	MTN Qhubeka
Fuyu Li	Dismissed after two positive tests for clenbuterol
José Luis Rubiera	Retired
Gert Steegmans	Quick-Step
Tomas Vaitkus	Astana

== One-day races ==
Before the spring season and the races known as classics, Team RadioShack was active in the Vuelta a Mallorca series of single-day races. In the Trofeo Inca, Hermans figured into a winning breakaway that formed 40 km (25 mi) from the finish, on the Puig Major climb. When this group's lead stretched to a minute with only 10 km (6.2 mi), it was clear they would stay away. Hermans stated that he had not felt confident going into the sprint, but he proved fresher than breakaway companions Arkaitz Durán and Xavier Tondó, winning the race. Later in February, Hunter won the field sprint finish to the second day of the Tour de Mumbai, restyled for 2011 as two one-day races in a similar vein to the Vuelta a Mallorca. The 11-lap 79 km (49 mi) criterium was originally meant to be a lap longer, but after the start was delayed for over an hour due to amateur riders and photographers crowding the course, it was shortened from the planned length of 108 km (67 mi).

=== Spring classics ===
Much like the Bruyneel-led Astana teams, Team RadioShack was not a major player in the spring classics. They did, however, attain a notable result in the season's third monument race, Paris–Roubaix. After a breakaway group of ten riders had first gone clear right about the time the cobbled sectors first began, Rast worked his way into a chase group which formed at the Arenberg sector. His group caught up with the leaders, and while Garmin–Cervélo's Johan Vansummeren soloed to victory, Rast stayed with the next group on the road through to the end of the race. He, Fabian Cancellara, and Maarten Tjallingii contested the sprint for second place. Cancellara took second with Tjallingii third, leaving Rast just off the podium in fourth. Thanks to this result and the team's strong showing at the Tour of the Basque Country stage race, they became the number one team in the UCI rankings after Paris–Roubaix.

The team also sent squads to the Trofeo Palma de Mallorca, Trofeo Cala Millor, Trofeo Deià, Trofeo Palmanova, the Classica Sarda, Milan – San Remo, Gent–Wevelgem, the Tour of Flanders, the Brabantse Pijl, La Flèche Wallonne and Liège–Bastogne–Liège, but placed no higher than 12th in any of these races.

=== Fall races ===
The team also sent squads to Paris–Brussels, the Grand Prix Cycliste de Montréal, Paris–Bourges and the Giro di Lombardia, but finished no higher than 12th in any of these races.

== Stage races ==
The Tour Down Under, the first stage race of the season, was Armstrong's last professional race. Despite claiming that he was "definitely not flying halfway around the world to sit in the bunch," Armstrong only showed combativity at one moment during the race, during an ultimately unsuccessful breakaway attempt during stage 5 to Willunga. He finished the race in 67th place, 6'42" down on overall winner Cameron Meyer. Elsewhere, McEwen was, for a time, an overall contender in the race. He was third in the sprint finish to the first stage, with the time bonus affording him that same position in the first general classification standings. The next day, a second place left him tied for first overall with Ben Swift and Matthew Goss, and gave him the ochre jersey as race leader. After slipping slightly over the next two days, McEwen lost any chance at overall victory on the Willunga stage, finishing in the same group as Armstrong 1'48" down on stage winner Francisco Ventoso and the majority of the overall contenders. He finished the race in 28th place. At the Ruta del Sol in February, Irizar finished second in the short stage 1 time trial, mere tenths of a second behind stage winner Jimmy Engoulvent. The next stage ended in a 43-rider sprint, and Engoulvent was dropped on the day's first climb, finishing nearly 23 minutes back. As a result, Irizar took the race leadership. The remaining race stages were similar – stage 3 featured an 85-rider sprint, stage 4 a 90-rider sprint, and stage 5 a 33-rider sprint. Irizar finished safely in the bunch on each stage, winning the race overall by a single second over Jurgen Van den Broeck and two over teammate Leipheimer, who had similarly ridden good stage 1 time trials. The squad also won the teams classification.

With a squad made up of younger riders, the team was quite successful at the Three Days of West Flanders stage race. Sergent won the prologue time trial, with Rosseler and Bewley in second and third ten seconds off his pace. Kwiatkowski also clocked in ten seconds off Sergent's time, for fifth on the day. The first of the two road race stages ended in a full field sprint with little change to the overall standings, and the second featured a reduced group sprint. Bewley missed an early selection and finished five minutes back, but Sergent, Rosseler, and Kwiatkowski all finished with the front group. They finished in that order in the final overall classification, giving the team a clean sweep of the event's final podium; Sergent also won the young rider classification and the squad also claimed the teams classification. At Paris–Nice in March, Klöden won the first major mountain stage, stage 5, from a very selective eight-rider group that finished together at the front of the race. He took the overall race leadership with the result, eleven years after he had won Paris–Nice overall. He finished fourth in the individual time trial the next day, but fourth place was a good 46 seconds down on stage winner Tony Martin, as the younger German took the race leadership. Klöden was unable to make back any time in the last two road stages, finishing second overall. The squad also took the team award. At Critérium International in March, Klöden won the stage 3 time trial, but managed only 22nd overall, having lost time in both the mountainous and flat road race stages. At the concurrent Volta a Catalunya, the team experienced both success and hardship. Cardoso won stage 4 in a full field sprint – so full that only two riders failed to finish with the rest of the peloton. Leipheimer had finished well-placed in the race's mountainous third stage, ceding 23 seconds to former teammate Alberto Contador but occupying a podium position, third, with the result. He continued to hold it through the sixth stage, but had to pull out of the race before the seventh and final stage due to stomach problems. He had spent the night before in the hospital with an abdominal sub-obstruction, an injury dating back to his childhood when he was kicked in the stomach by a horse. Being physically unable to complete the race cost him his podium position and the team 70 UCI World Tour points. Horner was the squad's best finisher, fourth overall. Rosseler won the closing time trial and, consequently, the overall crown of the Three Days of De Panne at the end of March. He had entered the stage as one of a great number of riders within ten seconds of pending race leader Bert De Backer. After teammate Kwiatkowski had first set a time solidly better than those which came before, Rosseler did him 14 seconds better to win both the stage and the race overall. Kwiatkowski took third in the stage and overall, while the squad earned the teams classification win.

The team entered the Tour of the Basque Country in April with defending champion Horner heading their squad, along with Klöden. Both finished near stage 1 winner Joaquim Rodríguez, with Horner a second back and Klöden tied on the same time. The race's top riders marked one another closely, and since the Tour of the Basque Country did not award bonus time anywhere in the race, these positions held through the fifth and final road race stage, with only the individual time trial remaining. Rodríguez is a vastly inferior time trialist to Horner, Klöden, and the other riders who populated the top of the overall standings going in, meaning the overall victory was very much in play. The winning time came from HTC–Highroad's Tony Martin. Horner clocked in 55 seconds down on Martin in ninth place for the day. Klöden actually surpassed Martin's best time at the intermediate time check, but could not maintain his pace. He still finished very strongly, only nine seconds down for second on the day. True to reputation, Rodríguez struggled, ceding two minutes to the stage winner. Klöden's performance won him the race overall; he had previously won this race in 2000 while riding for Team Telekom. He also won the points classification. Klöden turned in another fine race against the clock at the Giro del Trentino. He won the 13.4 km (8.3 mi) time trial by a single second over Lampre–ISD's Adriano Malori and eight over teammate Machado. He cracked on the climb to Ledro Bezzecca in stage 2, however, losing six minutes and any chance at winning the race.

Always a race which had been a target for Johan Bruyneel-led teams, Team RadioShack sent a strong squad to the Tour of California, headed by Horner and three-time winner Leipheimer. After the first stage was canceled and the first two to be run both favored sprinters, the team showed strongly in stage 4. This stage ended with a summit finish on Sierra Road. Horner won this stage 1'15" clear of any other riders, a massive time gap in a race which has historically been decided by seconds. The 2011 Tour returned to Solvang for its individual time trial after the race against the clock in 2010 had been in Los Angeles. Leipheimer, three times a winner on this course, could only manage second 14 seconds the lesser of Garmin–Cervélo's David Zabriskie. Horner was sixth, 51 seconds down, but still held a lead of 38 seconds over Leipheimer and over a minute against the next highest rider. The two captains dominated stage 7 to Mount Baldy. They broke away from the lead group with 3 km (1.9 mi) to go to the summit and finished 43 seconds clear of any other riders. Horner allowed Leipheimer to cross the line first – though Leipheimer had won the overall at the Tour of California three times, and similarly the Solvang time trial, this was his first road race stage win at the event. The two finished safely in the peloton in the finale stage, ending the race as the first two of five Americans at the top of the overall standings.

The team also won lesser classifications at the Volta ao Algarve, Volta a Catalunya, the Eneco Tour, the Tour of Utah, the Tour du Poitou-Charentes, the Tour de Wallonie-Picarde, and the Tour of Beijing. The team also sent squads to the Tour Down Under, the Giro di Sardegna, Tirreno–Adriatico, the Tour de Romandie, the Tour de Luxembourg, the Critérium du Dauphiné and the Tour de Pologne, but did not achieve a stage win, classification win, or podium finish in any of them.

== Away from competition ==
=== Merger with Leopard Trek ===
==== Riders' 2012 teams ====
Rider	2012 team
Fumiyuki Beppu	GreenEDGE
Sam Bewley	BikeNZ PureBlack Racing
Janez Brajkovič	Astana
Matthew Busche	RadioShack–Nissan
Manuel Antonio Cardoso	Caja Rural
Philip Deignan	UnitedHealthcare
Ben Hermans	RadioShack–Nissan
Chris Horner	RadioShack–Nissan
Robert Hunter	Garmin–Barracuda
Ben King	RadioShack–Nissan
Andreas Klöden	RadioShack–Nissan
Michał Kwiatkowski	Omega Pharma–Quick-Step
Markel Irizar	RadioShack–Nissan
Levi Leipheimer	Omega Pharma–Quick-Step

Rider	2012 team
Geoffroy Lequatre	Bretagne–Schuller
Tiago Machado	RadioShack–Nissan
Jason McCartney	UnitedHealthcare
Robbie McEwen	GreenEDGE
Dimitry Muravyev	Astana
Nelson Oliveira	RadioShack–Nissan
Sérgio Paulinho	Team Saxo Bank
Yaroslav Popovych	RadioShack–Nissan
Grégory Rast	RadioShack–Nissan
Sébastien Rosseler	Garmin–Barracuda
Ivan Rovny	RusVelo
Bjørn Selander	SpiderTech–C10
Jesse Sergent	RadioShack–Nissan
Haimar Zubeldia	RadioShack–Nissan

== Season victories ==
Date	Race	Competition	Rider	Country	Location
February 8	Trofeo Inca	UCI Europe Tour	Ben Hermans (BEL)	Spain	Inca
February 13	Tour de Mumbai II	UCI Asia Tour	Robert Hunter (RSA)	India	Mumbai
February 20	Volta ao Algarve, Portuguese rider classification	UCI Europe Tour	Tiago Machado (POR)	Portugal	
February 24	Vuelta a Andalucía, Overall	UCI Europe Tour	Markel Irizar (ESP)	Spain	
February 24	Vuelta a Andalucía, Teams classification	UCI Europe Tour	(Note: The riders on the squad were Levi Leipheimer, Haimar Zubeldia, Janez Brajkovič, Robert Hunter, Ivan Rovny, Dimitry Muravyev, and Markel Irizar)	Spain	
March 4	Driedaagse van West-Vlaanderen, Prologue	UCI Europe Tour	Jesse Sergent (NZL)	Belgium	Middelkerke
March 6	Driedaagse van West-Vlaanderen, Overall	UCI Europe Tour	Jesse Sergent (NZL)	Belgium	
March 6	Driedaagse van West-Vlaanderen, Young rider classification	UCI Europe Tour	Jesse Sergent (NZL)	Belgium	
March 6	Driedaagse van West-Vlaanderen, Teams classification	UCI Europe Tour	(Note: The riders on the squad were Sébastien Rosseler, Sam Bewley, Manuel Cardoso, Michał Kwiatkowski, Nelson Oliveira, Grégory Rast, Bjørn Selander, and Jesse Sergent)	Belgium	
March 10	Paris–Nice, Stage 5	UCI World Tour	Andreas Klöden (GER)	France	Vernoux-en-Vivarais
March 13	Paris–Nice, Teams classification	UCI World Tour	(Note: The riders on the squad were Janez Brajkovič, Matthew Busche, Robert Hunter, Markel Irizar, Andreas Klöden, Levi Leipheimer, Geoffroy Lequatre, and Sérgio Paulinho)	France	
March 24	Volta a Catalunya, Stage 4	UCI World Tour	Manuel Antonio Cardoso (POR)	Spain	El Vendrell
March 27	Volta a Catalunya, Teams classification	UCI World Tour	(Note: The riders on the squad were Haimar Zubeldia, Levi Leipheimer, Chris Horner, Philip Deignan, Janez Brajkovič, Jason McCartney, Ivan Rovny, and Manuel Antonio Cardoso)	Spain	
March 27	Critérium International, Stage 3	UCI Europe Tour	Andreas Klöden (GER)	France	Porto-Vecchio
March 31	Three Days of De Panne, Stage 3b	UCI Europe Tour	Sébastien Rosseler (BEL)	Belgium	De Panne
March 31	Three Days of De Panne, Overall	UCI Europe Tour	Sébastien Rosseler (BEL)	Belgium	
March 31	Three Days of De Panne, Teams classification	UCI Europe Tour	(Note: The riders on the squad were Dimitry Muravyev, Robert Hunter, Sébastien Rosseler, Sam Bewley, Jesse Sergent, Michał Kwiatkowski, Nelson Oliveira, and Grégory Rast)	Belgium	
April 9	Tour of the Basque Country, Overall	UCI World Tour	Andreas Klöden (GER)	Spain	
April 9	Tour of the Basque Country, Points classification	UCI World Tour	Andreas Klöden (GER)	Spain	
April 19	Giro del Trentino, Stage 1	UCI Europe Tour	Andreas Klöden (GER)	Italy	Arco
May 18	Tour of California, Stage 4	UCI America Tour	Chris Horner (USA)	United States	San Jose
May 21	Tour of California, Stage 7	UCI America Tour	Levi Leipheimer (USA)	United States	Mount Baldy
May 22	Tour of California, Overall	UCI America Tour	Chris Horner (USA)	United States	
May 29	Giro d'Italia, Trofeo Fuga Pinarello	UCI World Tour	Yaroslav Popovych (UKR)	Italy	
June 19	Tour de Suisse, Overall	UCI World Tour	Levi Leipheimer (USA)	Switzerland	
July 3	Tour of Austria, Stage 1	UCI Europe Tour	Robert Hunter (RSA)	Austria	Götzis
July 26	Tour de Wallonie, Stage 4	UCI Europe Tour	Robbie McEwen (AUS)	Belgium	Mouscron
August 12	Eneco Tour, Stage 4	UCI World Tour	Jesse Sergent (NZL)	Netherlands	Roermond
August 14	Eneco Tour, Teams classification	UCI World Tour	(Note: The riders on the squad were Robbie McEwen, Fumiyuki Beppu, Manuel Antonio Cardoso, Ben Hermans, Robert Hunter, Grégory Rast, Jesse Sergent, and Sam Bewley)	(Note: Race held in Belgium and the Netherlands.)	
August 14	Tour of Utah, Overall	UCI America Tour	Levi Leipheimer (USA)	United States	
August 14	Tour of Utah, Mountains classification	UCI America Tour	Levi Leipheimer (USA)	United States	
August 23	USA Pro Cycling Challenge, Stage 1	UCI America Tour	Levi Leipheimer (USA)	United States	Crested Butte
August 25	Tour du Poitou-Charentes, Stage 4	UCI Europe Tour	Jesse Sergent (NZL)	France	Châtellerault
August 25	USA Pro Cycling Challenge, Stage 3	UCI America Tour	Levi Leipheimer (USA)	United States	Vail
August 26	Tour du Poitou-Charentes, Overall	UCI Europe Tour	Jesse Sergent (NZL)	France	
August 26	Tour du Poitou-Charentes, Youth classification	UCI Europe Tour	Jesse Sergent (NZL)	France	
August 28	USA Pro Cycling Challenge, Overall	UCI America Tour	Levi Leipheimer (USA)	United States	
September 29	Tour de Wallonie-Picarde, Stage 1	UCI Europe Tour	Robbie McEwen (AUS)	Belgium	Péruwelz
October 2	Tour de Wallonie-Picarde, Stage 4	UCI Europe Tour	Robbie McEwen (AUS)	Belgium	Tournai
October 2	Tour de Wallonie-Picarde, Overall	UCI Europe Tour	Robbie McEwen (AUS)	Belgium	
October 9	Tour of Beijing, Young rider classification	UCI World Tour	Ben King (USA)	China	
