= 2010 Team RadioShack season =

2010 Team RadioShack season
Manager	Johan Bruyneel
One-day victories	1
Stage race overall victories	3
Stage race stage victories	8
Next season

The 2010 season for Team RadioShack, its first, began in January with the Tour Down Under and ended in October at the Giro di Lombardia. Team RadioShack rode in 2010 a UCI ProTour team, and was thus automatically invited to and obligated to send a squad to every ProTour event.

Much of the team joined after having competed as members of the Astana team from 2009, including team leaders Lance Armstrong, Levi Leipheimer, and Andreas Klöden, and team manager Johan Bruyneel. Many riders followed them, including all of Astana's 2009 Tour de France squad with the exception of champion Alberto Contador. The formation of the team was announced days after Alexander Vinokourov returned to Astana from suspension with new financial backers joining him – backers who favored Vinokourov and Contador over Bruyneel and Armstrong. The team also includes an assortment of riders who were members of other ProTour teams in 2009.

== 2010 roster ==
Ages as of January 1, 2010

Rider	Date of birth
Lance Armstrong (USA)	September 18, 1971 (aged 38)
Fumiyuki Beppu (JPN)	April 10, 1983 (aged 26)
Sam Bewley (NZL)	July 22, 1987 (aged 22)
Janez Brajkovič (SLO)	December 18, 1983 (aged 26)
Matthew Busche (USA)	May 9, 1985 (aged 24)
Ben Hermans (BEL)	June 8, 1986 (aged 23)
Chris Horner (USA)	November 10, 1971 (aged 38)
Andreas Klöden (GER)	June 22, 1975 (aged 34)
Daryl Impey (RSA)	December 6, 1984 (aged 25)
Markel Irizar (ESP)	February 5, 1980 (aged 29)
Levi Leipheimer (USA)	October 23, 1973 (aged 36)
Geoffroy Lequatre (FRA)	June 30, 1981 (aged 28)
Fuyu Li (CHN)	May 9, 1978 (aged 31)
Tiago Machado (POR)	October 18, 1985 (aged 24)

Rider	Date of birth
Jason McCartney (USA)	September 3, 1973 (aged 36)
Dmitriy Muravyev (KAZ)	November 2, 1979 (aged 30)
Sérgio Paulinho (POR)	March 26, 1980 (aged 29)
Yaroslav Popovych (UKR)	January 4, 1980 (aged 29)
Grégory Rast (SUI)	January 17, 1980 (aged 29)
Sébastien Rosseler (BEL)	July 15, 1981 (aged 28)
Ivan Rovny (RUS)	September 30, 1987 (aged 22)
José Luis Rubiera (ESP)	January 27, 1973 (aged 36)
Bjørn Selander (USA)	January 28, 1988 (aged 21)
Gert Steegmans (BEL)	September 30, 1980 (aged 29)
Tomas Vaitkus (LTU)	February 4, 1982 (aged 27)
Haimar Zubeldia (ESP)	April 1, 1977 (aged 32)

Riders' 2009 teams

Rider	2009 team
Lance Armstrong	Astana
Fumiyuki Beppu	Skil–Shimano
Sam Bewley	neo-pro
Janez Brajkovič	Astana
Matthew Busche	Kelly Benefit Strategies
Ben Hermans	Topsport Vlaanderen–Mercator
Chris Horner	Astana
Andreas Klöden	Astana
Daryl Impey	Barloworld
Markel Irizar	Euskaltel–Euskadi
Levi Leipheimer	Astana
Geoffroy Lequatre	Agritubel
Fuyu Li	Trek-Marco Polo Cycling Team
Tiago Machado	Madeinox-Boavista

Rider	2009 team
Jason McCartney	Team Saxo Bank
Dmitriy Muravyev	Astana
Sérgio Paulinho	Astana
Yaroslav Popovych	Astana
Grégory Rast	Astana
Sébastien Rosseler	Quick-Step
Ivan Rovny	Team Katusha
José Luis Rubiera	Astana
Bjørn Selander	neo-pro
Gert Steegmans	Team Katusha
Tomas Vaitkus	Astana
Haimar Zubeldia	Astana

== One-day races ==
=== Spring classics ===
Similar to the 2009 Astana team, Team RadioShack was not built for one-day races but rather for stage races. Its only win was earned in the Brabantse Pijl ("Brabant Arrow" in English) by Sébastien Rosseler.

=== Fall races ===
Levi Leipheimer won the Leadville Trail 100 MTB mountain bike race in August.

== Stage races ==
Team RadioShack's first event in their history was the Tour Down Under. Armstrong and Bruyneel commented that they were eager to come away from the race with victories, likely with ace sprinter Steegmans, because the entire executive committee of RadioShack was in Australia to see the race in person. Steegmans finished a close second behind eventual Tour winner André Greipel in the race's first stage, but that was as close as the team came to any wins. Nonetheless, Bruyneel said he was satisfied with the team's performance. In the Volta ao Algarve, Rosseler took the team's first-ever stage win, winning stage 4 from a breakaway. Machado finished third overall in the event, Leipheimer finished fourth, and won its unique award for best Portuguese rider. The squad also won the teams classification.

RadioShack had a decent year in stage races, although overall victories were rare. Through August, it had only three general classification victories: Chris Horner in the Tour of the Basque Country; Janez Brajkovič in the Critérium du Dauphiné; and Haimar Zubeldia in the Tour de l'Ain. However, four other riders had also finished on the podium: Lance Armstrong, second in the Tour de Suisse and third in the Tour de Luxembourg; Tiago Machado, third in the Volta ao Algarve; Levi Leipheimer, third in the Tour of California; and Matthew Busche, third in the Tour of Denmark. Leipheimer also won the Tour of the Gila, although technically the Team RadioShack riders in that race (despite wearing jerseys with "RadioShack" on the front) were riding for Armstrong's "Mellow Johnny's" team, and the Tour of Utah, in which he rode alone for Mellow Johnny's.

== Grand Tours ==
Because the three Grand Tour events are not part of the UCI ProTour, teams must be invited to each of the events and may choose not to participate. Team RadioShack requested not to be invited to the Giro d'Italia, instead sending their best riders to the concurrent Tour of California. Though the team actively sought a place in the Vuelta a España, they were not one of the 22 teams chosen for participation in that race either. They only participated in the Tour de France among the year's Grand Tours.

=== Tour de France ===
The 2010 RadioShack team in the Tour de France was almost identical to the 2009 Astana team, with seven of the nine riders. The only changes were Chris Horner, replacing Alberto Contador, who remained with Astana, and Janez Brajkovic, replacing Haimar Zubeldia, who was recovering from a broken wrist. Although the team once again won Best Team, its highest individual result came from Horner, who finished 10th.

== Season victories ==
Date	Race	Competition	Rider	Country	Location
February 20	Volta ao Algarve, Stage 4	UCI Europe Tour	Sébastien Rosseler (BEL)	Portugal	Tavira
February 20	Volta ao Algarve, Portuguese rider classification	UCI Europe Tour	Tiago Machado (POR)	Portugal	
February 21	Volta ao Algarve, Teams classification	UCI Europe Tour	(Note: The riders on the squad were Levi Leipheimer, Gert Steegmans, Tiago Machado, Andreas Klöden, Sébastien Rosseler, Grégory Rast, Sérgio Paulinho, and Tomas Vaitkus)	Portugal	
February 27	Giro di Sardegna, Teams classification	UCI Europe Tour	(Note: The riders on the squad were Ben Hermans, Chris Horner, Janez Brajkovič, Ivan Rovny, Geoffroy Lequatre, Dmitriy Muravyev, Matthew Busche, and Markel Irizar)	Italy	
March 28	Critérium International, Youth classification	UCI Europe Tour	Tiago Machado (POR)	France	
March 28	Critérium International, Teams classification	UCI Europe Tour	(Note: The riders on the squad were Tiago Machado, Chris Horner, Ben Hermans, Yaroslav Popovych, Lance Armstrong, Sérgio Paulinho, Matthew Busche, and Ivan Rovny)	France	
April 7	Circuit de la Sarthe, Stage 2B	UCI Europe Tour	Tiago Machado (POR)	France	Angers
April 10	Tour of the Basque Country, Stage 6	UCI ProTour	Chris Horner (USA)	Spain	Orio
April 10	Tour of the Basque Country, Overall	UCI ProTour	Chris Horner (USA)	Spain	
April 14	Brabantse Pijl	UCI Europe Tour	Sébastien Rosseler (BEL)	Belgium	Overijse
April 18	Vuelta a Castilla y León, Teams classification	UCI Europe Tour	(Note: The riders on the squad were Tiago Machado, Fumiyuki Beppu, Markel Irizar, Janez Brajkovič, José Luis Rubiera, Gert Steegmans, Sam Bewley, and Jason McCartney)	Spain	
May 2	Tour de Romandie, Teams classification	UCI ProTour	(Note: The riders on the squad were Tiago Machado, Janez Brajkovič, Matthew Busche, Haimar Zubeldia, José Luis Rubiera, Sérgio Paulinho, Markel Irizar, and Gert Steegmans)	Switzerland	
May 30	Tour of Belgium, Stage 5	UCI Europe Tour	Ben Hermans (BEL)	Belgium	Herstal
June 6	Tour de Luxembourg, Teams classification	UCI Europe Tour	(Note: The riders on the squad were Andreas Klöden, Lance Armstrong, Sam Bewley, Daryl Impey, Tiago Machado, Ivan Rovny, Grégory Rast, and Bjørn Selander)	Luxembourg	
June 9	Critérium du Dauphiné, Stage 3	UCI World Ranking	Janez Brajkovič (SLO)	France	Sorgues
June 13	Critérium du Dauphiné, Overall	UCI World Ranking	Janez Brajkovič (SLO)	France	
July 11	Tour of Austria, Teams classification	UCI Europe Tour	(Note: The riders on the squad were Fumiyuki Beppu, Matthew Busche, Daryl Impey, Markel Irizar, Tiago Machado, Ivan Rovny, José Luis Rubiera, and Ben Hermans)	Austria	
July 14	Tour de France, Stage 10	UCI World Ranking	Sérgio Paulinho (POR)	France	Gap
July 25	Tour de France, Teams classification	UCI World Ranking	(Note: The riders on the squad were Lance Armstrong, Janez Brajkovič, Chris Horner, Andreas Klöden, Levi Leipheimer, Dimitry Muravyev, Sérgio Paulinho, Yaroslav Popovych, and Grégory Rast)	France	Bordeaux
August 10	Tour de l'Ain, Prologue	UCI Europe Tour	Haimar Zubeldia (ESP)	France	Amberieu-En-Bugey
August 14	Tour de l'Ain, Overall	UCI Europe Tour	Haimar Zubeldia (ESP)	France	
August 14	Leadville Trail 100 MTB	Mountain bike event	Levi Leipheimer (USA)	United States	Leadville, Colorado
August 27	Tour du Poitou-Charentes, Stage 4	UCI Europe Tour	Markel Irizar (ESP)	France	Vouillé
