= 2011 Volta ao Algarve =

Race details
- Dates: 16–20 February 2011
- Stages: 5
- Distance: 707.7 km (439.7 mi)
- Winning time: 18h 48' 45"

Results
| Jersey awarded to the overall winner | Winner | Tony Martin (GER) | (HTC–Highroad) |
| | Second | Tejay van Garderen (USA) | (HTC–Highroad) |
| | Third | Lieuwe Westra (NED) | (Vacansoleil–DCM) |
| Jersey awarded to the points classification winner | Points | Tyler Farrar (USA) | (Garmin–Cervélo) |
| Jersey awarded to the mountains classification winner | Mountains | Ricardo Mestre (POR) | (Tavira–Prio) |
| Jersey awarded to the sprints classification winner | Sprints | Cesar Fonte (POR) | (Barbot–Efapel) |
| | Team | HTC–Highroad | |

The 2011 Volta ao Algarve was the 37th edition of the Volta ao Algarve cycling stage race. It was held from 16 to 20 February 2011, and was rated as a 2.1 event on the UCI Europe Tour. Just like the previous year, it started at the Algarve Stadium in Faro and ended with an individual time trial in Portimão.

== Teams and cyclists ==
There were 21 teams in the 2011 Volta ao Algarve. Among them were 12 UCI ProTour teams, five UCI Professional Continental teams, and four Continental teams. Each team was allowed eight riders on their squad, giving the event a peloton of 168 cyclists at its outset.

The 21 teams in the race were:

UCI ProTour Teams

- Ag2r–La Mondiale
- Astana
- Garmin–Cervélo
- Omega Pharma–Lotto
- Quick-Step
- HTC–Highroad
- Leopard Trek
- Team RadioShack
- Saxo Bank–SunGard
- Team Sky
- Rabobank
- Vacansoleil–DCM

UCI Professional Continental Teams

- Caja Rural
- CCC–Polsat–Polkowice
- Cofidis
- Topsport Vlaanderen–Mercator
- UnitedHealthcare

UCI Continental Teams

- Barbot–Efapel
- LA–Antarte
- Onda
- Tavira–Prio

== Tour stages ==
=== Stage 1 ===
16 February 2011 – Algarve Stadium to Albufeira, 157.5 km (97.9 mi)

Stage 1 results

| | Cyclist | Team | Time |
|---|---|---|---|
| 1 | Philippe Gilbert (BEL) | Omega Pharma–Lotto | 4h 36' 36" |
| 2 | Gerald Ciolek (GER) | Quick-Step | + 5" |
| 3 | André Greipel (GER) | Omega Pharma–Lotto | + 5" |
| 4 | Tyler Farrar (USA) | Garmin–Cervélo | + 5" |
| 5 | Michael Matthews (AUS) | Rabobank | + 5" |
| 6 | Baden Cooke (AUS) | Saxo Bank–SunGard | + 5" |
| 7 | John Degenkolb (GER) | HTC–Highroad | + 5" |
| 8 | Andreas Klöden (GER) | Team RadioShack | + 5" |
| 9 | Tony Gallopin (FRA) | Cofidis | + 5" |
| 10 | Wout Poels (NED) | Vacansoleil–DCM | + 5" |

General Classification after Stage 1

| | Cyclist | Team | Time |
|---|---|---|---|
| 1 | Philippe Gilbert (BEL) | Omega Pharma–Lotto | 4h 36' 26" |
| 2 | Gerald Ciolek (GER) | Quick-Step | + 9" |
| 3 | André Greipel (GER) | Omega Pharma–Lotto | + 11" |
| 4 | Tyler Farrar (USA) | Garmin–Cervélo | + 15" |
| 5 | Michael Matthews (AUS) | Rabobank | + 15" |
| 6 | Baden Cooke (AUS) | Saxo Bank–SunGard | + 15" |
| 7 | John Degenkolb (GER) | HTC–Highroad | + 15" |
| 8 | Andreas Klöden (GER) | Team RadioShack | + 15" |
| 9 | Tony Gallopin (FRA) | Cofidis | + 15" |
| 10 | Wout Poels (NED) | Vacansoleil–DCM | + 15" |

=== Stage 2 ===
17 February 2011 – Lagoa to Lagos, 186.5 km (115.9 mi)

Stage 2 results

| | Cyclist | Team | Time |
|---|---|---|---|
| 1 | John Degenkolb (GER) | HTC–Highroad | 4h 57' 56" |
| 2 | Tyler Farrar (USA) | Garmin–Cervélo | s.t. |
| 3 | Michael Matthews (AUS) | Rabobank | s.t. |
| 4 | Baden Cooke (AUS) | Saxo Bank–SunGard | + 1" |
| 5 | Sébastien Hinault (FRA) | Ag2r–La Mondiale | + 1" |
| 6 | Philippe Gilbert (BEL) | Omega Pharma–Lotto | + 1" |
| 7 | Filipe Duarte Sousa Cardoso (POR) | Barbot–Efapel | + 1" |
| 8 | Fabian Wegmann (GER) | Leopard Trek | + 1" |
| 9 | Gerald Ciolek (GER) | Quick-Step | + 1" |
| 10 | Dmitry Fofonov (KAZ) | Astana | + 1" |

General Classification after Stage 2

| | Cyclist | Team | Time |
|---|---|---|---|
| 1 | Philippe Gilbert (BEL) | Omega Pharma–Lotto | 9h 34' 23" |
| 2 | John Degenkolb (GER) | HTC–Highroad | + 4" |
| 3 | Tyler Farrar (USA) | Garmin–Cervélo | + 8" |
| 4 | Gerald Ciolek (GER) | Quick-Step | + 9" |
| 5 | Michael Matthews (AUS) | Rabobank | + 10" |
| 6 | Baden Cooke (AUS) | Saxo Bank–SunGard | + 15" |
| 7 | Filipe Duarte Sousa Cardoso (POR) | Barbot–Efapel | + 15" |
| 8 | Fabian Wegmann (GER) | Leopard Trek | + 15" |
| 9 | Jürgen Roelandts (BEL) | Omega Pharma–Lotto | + 15" |
| 10 | Sebastian Langeveld (NED) | Rabobank | + 15" |

=== Stage 3 ===
18 February 2011 – Tavira to Malhão, 179.2 km (111.3 mi)

Stage 3 results

| | Cyclist | Team | Time |
|---|---|---|---|
| 1 | Steve Cummings (GBR) | Team Sky | 4h 56' 19" |
| 2 | Tejay van Garderen (USA) | HTC–Highroad | s.t. |
| 3 | Alberto Contador (ESP) | Saxo Bank–SunGard | s.t. |
| 4 | Rein Taaramäe (EST) | Cofidis | s.t. |
| 5 | Tony Martin (GER) | HTC–Highroad | s.t. |
| 6 | Tiago Machado (POR) | Team RadioShack | + 6" |
| 7 | Simon Gerrans (AUS) | Team Sky | + 16" |
| 8 | Roman Kreuziger (CZE) | Astana | + 16" |
| 9 | Andreas Klöden (GER) | Team RadioShack | + 16" |
| 10 | Ryder Hesjedal (CAN) | Garmin–Cervélo | + 16" |

General Classification after Stage 3

| | Cyclist | Team | Time |
|---|---|---|---|
| 1 | Steve Cummings (GBR) | Team Sky | 14h 30' 47" |
| 2 | Alberto Contador (ESP) | Saxo Bank–SunGard | + 6" |
| 3 | Tony Martin (GER) | HTC–Highroad | + 10" |
| 4 | Tejay van Garderen (USA) | HTC–Highroad | + 12" |
| 5 | Rein Taaramäe (EST) | Cofidis | + 18" |
| 6 | Andreas Klöden (GER) | Team RadioShack | + 26" |
| 7 | Ryder Hesjedal (CAN) | Garmin–Cervélo | + 26" |
| 8 | Simon Gerrans (AUS) | Team Sky | + 26" |
| 9 | Wout Poels (NED) | Vacansoleil–DCM | + 30" |
| 10 | Tiago Machado (POR) | Team RadioShack | + 31" |

=== Stage 4 ===
19 February 2011 – Albufeira to Tavira, 167.3 km (104.0 mi)

Stage 4 results

| | Cyclist | Team | Time |
|---|---|---|---|
| 1 | André Greipel (GER) | Omega Pharma–Lotto | 3h 56' 55" |
| 2 | Michael Matthews (AUS) | Rabobank | s.t. |
| 3 | Anthony Ravard (FRA) | Ag2r–La Mondiale | s.t. |
| 4 | Tyler Farrar (USA) | Garmin–Cervélo | s.t. |
| 5 | Allan Davis (AUS) | Astana | s.t. |
| 6 | John Degenkolb (GER) | HTC–Highroad | s.t. |
| 7 | Gerald Ciolek (GER) | Quick-Step | s.t. |
| 8 | Boy Van Poppel (NED) | UnitedHealthcare | s.t. |
| 9 | Borut Božič (SLO) | Vacansoleil–DCM | s.t. |
| 10 | Baden Cooke (AUS) | Saxo Bank–SunGard | s.t. |

General Classification after Stage 4

| | Cyclist | Team | Time |
|---|---|---|---|
| 1 | Steve Cummings (GBR) | Team Sky | 18h 27' 42" |
| 2 | Alberto Contador (ESP) | Saxo Bank–SunGard | + 6" |
| 3 | Tony Martin (GER) | HTC–Highroad | + 10" |
| 4 | Tejay van Garderen (USA) | HTC–Highroad | + 12" |
| 5 | Rein Taaramäe (EST) | Cofidis | + 18" |
| 6 | Andreas Klöden (GER) | Team RadioShack | + 26" |
| 7 | Ryder Hesjedal (CAN) | Garmin–Cervélo | + 26" |
| 8 | Simon Gerrans (AUS) | Team Sky | + 26" |
| 9 | Wout Poels (NED) | Vacansoleil–DCM | + 30" |
| 10 | Tiago Machado (POR) | Team RadioShack | + 31" |

=== Stage 5 ===
20 February 2011 – Lagoa to Portimão, 17.2 km (10.7 mi)

Stage 5 results

| | Cyclist | Team | Time |
|---|---|---|---|
| 1 | Tony Martin (GER) | HTC–Highroad | 20' 53" |
| 2 | Lieuwe Westra (NED) | Vacansoleil–DCM | + 5" |
| 3 | Tiago Machado (POR) | Team RadioShack | + 26" |
| 4 | Jesse Sergent (NZL) | Team RadioShack | + 27" |
| 5 | Andreas Klöden (GER) | Team RadioShack | + 30" |
| 6 | Tejay van Garderen (USA) | HTC–Highroad | + 30" |
| 7 | Luis León Sánchez (ESP) | Rabobank | + 30" |
| 8 | Sébastien Rosseler (BEL) | Team RadioShack | + 31" |
| 9 | Thomas De Gendt (BEL) | Vacansoleil–DCM | + 39" |
| 10 | Sylvain Chavanel (FRA) | Quick-Step | + 42" |

Final Classification

| | Cyclist | Team | Time |
|---|---|---|---|
| 1 | Tony Martin (GER) | HTC–Highroad | 18h 48' 45" |
| 2 | Tejay van Garderen (USA) | HTC–Highroad | + 32" |
| 3 | Lieuwe Westra (NED) | Vacansoleil–DCM | + 39" |
| 4 | Alberto Contador (ESP) | Saxo Bank–SunGard | + 41" |
| 5 | Andreas Klöden (GER) | Team RadioShack | + 46" |
| 6 | Tiago Machado (POR) | Team RadioShack | + 47" |
| 7 | Steve Cummings (GBR) | Team Sky | + 53" |
| 8 | Rein Taaramäe (EST) | Cofidis | + 59" |
| 9 | Luis León Sánchez (ESP) | Rabobank | + 1' 04" |
| 10 | Thomas De Gendt (BEL) | Vacansoleil–DCM | + 1' 05" |

== Classification leadership ==
In the 2011 Volta ao Algarve, four different jerseys were awarded. For the general classification, calculated by adding each cyclist's finishing times on each stage, and allowing time bonuses for the first three finishers on each stage and in intermediate sprints, the leader received a yellow jersey. This classification was considered the most important of the Volta ao Algarve, and the winner is considered the winner of the Volta. Additionally, there was a sprints classification, which awarded a blue jersey. In the sprints classification, cyclists got points for finishing in the top three in an intermediate sprint. The first across the sprint points got 3 points, the second got 2, and the third got a single point.

There was also a mountains classification, which awarded a green jersey. In the mountains classification, points were won by reaching the top of a mountain before other cyclists. Each climb was categorized, with the more difficult climbs awarding more points.

The points classification awarded a white jersey. In the points classification, cyclists got points based on the order at the finish line of each stage. The stage win afforded 25 points, second on the stage was worth 20, third 16, fourth 13, fifth 10, sixth 8, seventh 6, eighth 4, ninth 2, and tenth was worth a single point. The points awarded in the sprints classification counted equivalently for this classification.

There was fifth classification to this race for the best Portuguese rider. However, no jersey was awarded, since the UCI limits the amount of rewarded jerseys to four per race.

The race also awarded a teams classification, which, too, was not represented by a jersey. The teams classification was calculated by adding the times of each team's best three riders per stage per day.

| Stage | Winner | General Classification | Mountains Classification | Sprints Classification | Points Classification | Best Portuguese Rider Classification | Teams Classification |
|---|---|---|---|---|---|---|---|
| 1 | Philippe Gilbert | Philippe Gilbert | Ricardo Mestre | César Fonte | Philippe Gilbert | Filipe Duarte Sousa Cardoso | Omega Pharma–Lotto |
| 2 | John Degenkolb | Philippe Gilbert | Ricardo Mestre | Thomas De Gendt | Philippe Gilbert | Filipe Duarte Sousa Cardoso | HTC–Highroad |
| 3 | Steve Cummings | Steve Cummings | Ricardo Mestre | Thomas De Gendt | Tyler Farrar | Tiago Machado | HTC–Highroad |
| 4 | André Greipel | Steve Cummings | Ricardo Mestre | César Fonte | Tyler Farrar | Tiago Machado | HTC–Highroad |
| 5 | Tony Martin | Tony Martin | Ricardo Mestre | César Fonte | Tyler Farrar | Tiago Machado | HTC–Highroad |
| Final | | Tony Martin | Ricardo Mestre | César Fonte | Tyler Farrar | Tiago Machado | HTC–Highroad |
