= 2013 Volta ao Algarve =

Race details
- Dates: 14–17 February 2013
- Stages: 4
- Distance: 621.6 km (386.2 mi)
- Winning time: 15h 36' 26"

Results
Jersey awarded to the overall winner	Winner	Tony Martin (GER)	(Omega Pharma–Quick-Step)
	Second	Michal Kwiatkowski (POL)	(Omega Pharma–Quick-Step)
	Third	Lieuwe Westra (NED)	(Vacansoleil–DCM)
Jersey awarded to the points classification winner	Points	Giacomo Nizzolo (ITA)	(RadioShack–Leopard)
Jersey awarded to the mountains classification winner	Mountains	Manuele Boaro (ITA)	(Saxo–Tinkoff)
Jersey awarded to the sprints classification winner	Sprints	Hugo Sabido (POR)	(LA Alumínios–Antarte)
	Team	RadioShack–Leopard	

The 2013 Volta ao Algarve was the 39th edition of the Volta ao Algarve cycling stage race. It was rated as a 2.1 event on the UCI Europe Tour, and was held from 14 to 17 February 2013, in Portugal.

The race was won by Germany's Tony Martin, of Omega Pharma–Quick-Step courtesy of his dominant victory in the final ITT stage winning the time trial by over a minute. Martin's winning margin over his teammate and runner-up Michal Kwiatkowski was 58 seconds, and Dutch rider Lieuwe Westra (Vacansoleil–DCM) completed the podium, a further second behind Kwiatkowski and 59 seconds down on Martin. In the race's other classifications, Italian Giacomo Nizzolo (RadioShack–Leopard) won the points classification, Portugal's Hugo Sabido (LA Alumínios–Antarte) won the sprints classification, Italy's Manuele Boaro of Saxo–Tinkoff won the green jersey for the mountains classification, and RadioShack–Leopard finished at the head of the teams classification.

== Race overview ==
Stage	Date	Course	Distance	Type	Winner
1	14 February	Faro to Albufeira	198.8 km (123.5 mi)	Flat stage	Paul Martens (GER)
2	15 February	Lagoa to Lagoa	195 km (121.2 mi)	Flat stage	Theo Bos (NED)
3	16 February	Portimão to Alto do Malhão	193 km (119.9 mi)	Medium-mountain stage	Sergio Henao (COL)
4	17 February	Castro Marim to Tavira	34.8 km (21.6 mi)	Individual time trial	Tony Martin (GER)

== Stages ==
=== Stage 1 ===
14 February 2013 – Faro to Albufeira, 198.8 km (123.5 mi)

Stage 1 Result

	Rider	Team	Time
1	Paul Martens (GER)	Blanco Pro Cycling	5h 07' 29"
2	Tiago Machado (POR)	RadioShack–Leopard	s.t.
3	Theo Bos (NED)	Blanco Pro Cycling	s.t.
4	Giacomo Nizzolo (ITA)	RadioShack–Leopard	s.t.
5	Thomas Sprengers (BEL)	Topsport Vlaanderen–Baloise	s.t.
6	Mark Cavendish (GBR)	Omega Pharma–Quick-Step	s.t.
7	Tom Van Asbroeck (BEL)	Topsport Vlaanderen–Baloise	s.t.
8	Rui Costa (POR)	Movistar Team	s.t.
9	Alessandro Bazzana (ITA)	UnitedHealthcare	s.t.
10	Samuel José Caldeira (POR)	OFM-Quinta Da Lixa	s.t.

General Classification after Stage 1

	Rider	Team	Time
1	Paul Martens (GER)	Blanco Pro Cycling	5h 07' 29"
2	Tiago Machado (POR)	RadioShack–Leopard	+ 0"
3	Theo Bos (NED)	Blanco Pro Cycling	+ 0"
4	Giacomo Nizzolo (ITA)	RadioShack–Leopard	+ 0"
5	Thomas Sprengers (BEL)	Topsport Vlaanderen–Baloise	+ 0"
6	Mark Cavendish (GBR)	Omega Pharma–Quick-Step	+ 0"
7	Tom Van Asbroeck (BEL)	Topsport Vlaanderen–Baloise	+ 0"
8	Rui Costa (POR)	Movistar Team	+ 0"
9	Alessandro Bazzana (ITA)	UnitedHealthcare	+ 0"
10	Samuel José Caldeira (POR)	OFM-Quinta Da Lixa	+ 0"

=== Stage 2 ===
15 February 2013 – Lagoa to Lagoa, 195 km (121.2 mi)

Stage 2 Result

	Rider	Team	Time
1	Theo Bos (NED)	Blanco Pro Cycling	4h 50' 15"
2	Giacomo Nizzolo (ITA)	RadioShack–Leopard	s.t.
3	Bruno Sancho (POR)	Carmim–Tavira	s.t.
4	Jesús Herrada (ESP)	Movistar Team	s.t.
5	Kris Boeckmans (BEL)	Vacansoleil–DCM	s.t.
6	Thomas Leezer (NED)	Blanco Pro Cycling	s.t.
7	Alessandro Bazzana (ITA)	UnitedHealthcare	s.t.
8	Pieter Vanspeybrouck (BEL)	Topsport Vlaanderen–Baloise	s.t.
8	Edwin Ávila (COL)	Colombia	s.t.
10	Michael Mørkøv (DEN)	Saxo–Tinkoff	s.t.

General Classification after Stage 2

	Rider	Team	Time
1	Theo Bos (NED)	Blanco Pro Cycling	9h 57' 30"
2	Paul Martens (GER)	Blanco Pro Cycling	+ 4"
3	Giacomo Nizzolo (ITA)	RadioShack–Leopard	+ 8"
4	Tiago Machado (POR)	RadioShack–Leopard	+ 8"
5	Hugo Sabido (POR)	LA Alumínios–Antarte	+ 9"
6	Eduard Vorganov (RUS)	Team Katusha	+ 9"
7	Bruno Sancho (POR)	Carmim–Tavira	+ 10"
8	Amets Txurruka (ESP)	Caja Rural	+ 11"
9	Sérgio Paulinho (POR)	Saxo–Tinkoff	+ 12"
10	Bert-Jan Lindeman (NED)	Vacansoleil–DCM	+ 12"

=== Stage 3 ===
16 February 2013 – Portimão to Alto do Malhão, 193 km (119.9 mi)

Stage 3 Result

	Rider	Team	Time
1	Sergio Henao (COL)	Team Sky	4h 53' 15"
2	Rui Costa (POR)	Movistar Team	+ 3"
3	Lieuwe Westra (NED)	Vacansoleil–DCM	+ 5"
4	Rigoberto Urán (COL)	Team Sky	+ 7"
5	Tiago Machado (POR)	RadioShack–Leopard	+ 7"
6	Andreas Klöden (GER)	RadioShack–Leopard	+ 7"
7	Josh Edmondson (GBR)	Team Sky	+ 7"
8	Denis Menchov (RUS)	Team Katusha	+ 7"
8	Jesús Herrada (ESP)	Movistar Team	+ 12"
10	Michał Kwiatkowski (POL)	Omega Pharma–Quick-Step	+ 12"

General Classification after Stage 3

	Rider	Team	Time
1	Sergio Henao (COL)	Team Sky	14h 50' 49"
2	Rui Costa (POR)	Movistar Team	+ 7"
3	Tiago Machado (POR)	RadioShack–Leopard	+ 11"
4	Lieuwe Westra (NED)	Vacansoleil–DCM	+ 11"
5	Andreas Klöden (GER)	RadioShack–Leopard	+ 17"
6	Rigoberto Urán (COL)	Team Sky	+ 17"
7	Denis Menchov (RUS)	Team Katusha	+ 17"
8	Josh Edmondson (GBR)	Team Sky	+ 17"
9	Michał Kwiatkowski (POL)	Omega Pharma–Quick-Step	+ 19"
10	Jesús Herrada (ESP)	Movistar Team	+ 22"

=== Stage 4 ===
17 February 2013 – Castro Marim to Tavira, 34.8 km (21.6 mi); individual time trial (ITT)

Stage 4 Result

	Rider	Team	Time
1	Tony Martin (GER)	Omega Pharma–Quick-Step	45' 09"
2	Michał Kwiatkowski (POL)	Omega Pharma–Quick-Step	+ 1' 07"
3	Jesse Sergent (NZL)	RadioShack–Leopard	+ 1' 15"
4	Lieuwe Westra (NED)	Vacansoleil–DCM	+ 1' 16"
5	Jonathan Castroviejo (ESP)	Movistar Team	+ 1' 30"
6	Denis Menchov (RUS)	Team Katusha	+ 1' 32"
7	Tiago Machado (POR)	RadioShack–Leopard	+ 1' 47"
8	Rui Costa (POR)	Movistar Team	+ 1' 47"
9	Andreas Klöden (GER)	RadioShack–Leopard	+ 2' 04"
10	Jan Bakelants (BEL)	RadioShack–Leopard	+ 2' 32"

Final General Classification

	Rider	Team	Time
1	Tony Martin (GER)	Omega Pharma–Quick-Step	15h 36' 26"
2	Michał Kwiatkowski (POL)	Omega Pharma–Quick-Step	+ 58"
3	Lieuwe Westra (NED)	Vacansoleil–DCM	+ 59"
4	Denis Menchov (RUS)	Team Katusha	+ 1' 21"
5	Rui Costa (POR)	Movistar Team	+ 1' 26"
6	Tiago Machado (POR)	RadioShack–Leopard	+ 1' 30"
7	Jesse Sergent (NZL)	RadioShack–Leopard	+ 1' 40"
8	Jonathan Castroviejo (ESP)	Movistar Team	+ 1' 45"
9	Andreas Klöden (GER)	RadioShack–Leopard	+ 1' 53"
10	Rigoberto Urán (COL)	Team Sky	+ 2' 31"

== Classification leadership ==
Stage	Winner	General Classification	Mountains Classification	Sprints Classification	Points Classification	Local Rider Classification	Teams Classification
1	Paul Martens	Paul Martens	Sérgio Paulinho	Eduard Vorganov	Paul Martens	Tiago Machado	Blanco Pro Cycling
2	Theo Bos	Theo Bos	Manuele Boaro	Hugo Sabido	Theo Bos	Tiago Machado	Blanco Pro Cycling
3	Sergio Henao	Sergio Henao	Manuele Boaro	Hugo Sabido	Giacomo Nizzolo	Rui Costa	Team Sky
4	Tony Martin	Tony Martin	Manuele Boaro	Hugo Sabido	Giacomo Nizzolo	Rui Costa	RadioShack–Leopard
Final		Tony Martin	Manuele Boaro	Hugo Sabido	Giacomo Nizzolo	Rui Costa	RadioShack–Leopard
