= 2000 Paris–Nice =

Race details
- Dates: 5–12 March 2000
- Stages: 7 + Prologue
- Distance: 1,151.1 km (715.3 mi)
- Winning time: 28h 19' 50"

Results
Jersey awarded to the overall winner	Winner	Andreas Klöden (GER)	(Team Telekom)
	Second	Laurent Brochard (FRA)	(Jean Delatour)
	Third	Francisco Mancebo (ESP)	(Banesto)

The 2000 Paris–Nice was the 58th edition of the Paris–Nice cycle race and was held from 5 March to 12 March 2000. The race started at the Bois de Vincennes and finished in Nice. The race was won by Andreas Klöden of the Telekom team.

== Teams ==
Twenty teams, containing a total of 160 riders, participated in the race:

- U.S. Postal Service
- Cofidis
- Banesto
- Team Polti
- Team Telekom
- Bonjour
- Crédit Agricole
- Vini Caldirola–Sidermec
- Saeco–Valli & Valli
- Rabobank
- Mapei–Quick-Step
- Française des Jeux
- Jean Delatour
- Festina
- Lotto–Adecco
- AG2R Prévoyance
- Fassa Bortolo
- Memory Card–Jack & Jones
- Kelme–Costa Blanca
- BigMat–Auber 93

== Route ==
Stage characteristics and winners
Stage	Date	Course	Distance	Type	Winner
1	5 March	Bois de Vincennes	7.9 km (4.9 mi)	Individual time trial	Laurent Brochard (FRA)
2	6 March	Sens to Nevers	201 km (125 mi)		Jaan Kirsipuu (EST)
3	7 March	Nevers to Belleville	203.7 km (126.6 mi)		Fabio Baldato (ITA)
4	8 March	Trévoux to Saint-Étienne	178 km (111 mi)		Bo Hamburger (DEN)
5	9 March	Berre-l'Étang to Sisteron	194.2 km (120.7 mi)		Matteo Tosatto (ITA)
6	10 March	Sisteron to Villeneuve-Loubet	196.2 km (121.9 mi)		François Simon (FRA)
7	11 March	Nice to Col d'Èze	10 km (6.2 mi)	Individual time trial	Andreas Klöden (GER)
8	12 March	Nice to Nice	160.1 km (99.5 mi)		Tom Steels (BEL)

== General classification ==
Final general classification

Rank	Rider	Team	Time
1	Andreas Klöden (GER)	Team Telekom	28h 19' 50"
2	Laurent Brochard (FRA)	Jean Delatour	+ 7"
3	Francisco Mancebo (ESP)	Banesto	+ 44"
4	François Simon (FRA)	Bonjour	+ 53"
5	Javier Pascual Rodríguez (ESP)	Kelme–Costa Blanca	+ 56"
6	Jonathan Vaughters (USA)	Crédit Agricole	+ 1' 02"
7	Martin Rittsel (SWE)	Memory Card–Jack & Jones	+ 1' 15"
8	Frankie Andreu (USA)	U.S. Postal Service	+ 1' 17"
9	Dario Frigo (ITA)	Fassa Bortolo	+ 1' 17"
10	Tomasz Brożyna (POL)	Banesto	+ 1' 18"
