= 2011 Giro del Trentino =

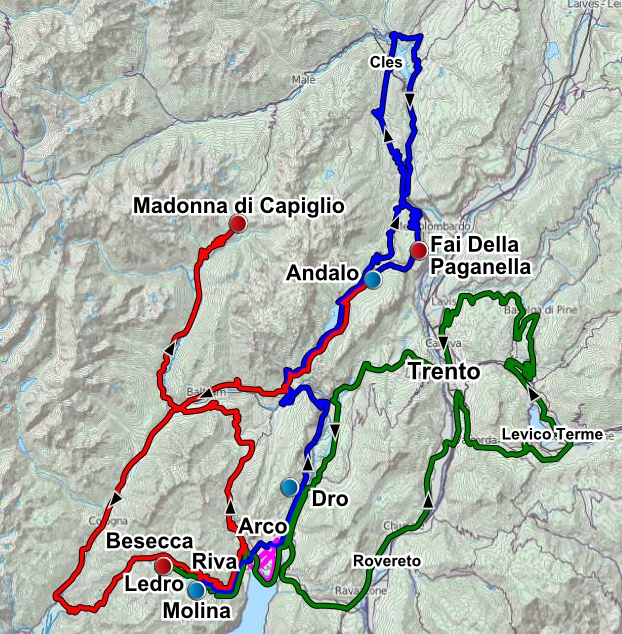

Race details
- Dates: 19–22 April
- Stages: 4
- Distance: 528.9 km (328.6 mi)
- Winning time: 18h 48' 45"

Results
Jersey awarded to the overall winner	Winner	Michele Scarponi (ITA)	(Lampre–ISD)
	Second	Tiago Machado (POR)	(Team RadioShack)
	Third	Luca Ascani (ITA)	(D'Angelo & Antenucci-Nippo)

The 2011 Giro del Trentino was the 35th edition of the Giro del Trentino cycling stage race. It was held from 19–22 April 2011, as 2.HC event on the UCI Europe Tour. Italian Michele Scarponi of Lampre–ISD won the overall classification after moving into the leader's jersey after stage 2. Tiago Machado was second, Luca Ascani third.

== Teams and cyclists ==
There were 18 teams in the 2011 Giro del Trentino. Among them were 7 UCI ProTeams, seven UCI Professional Continental teams, and four Continental teams. Each team was allowed eight riders on their squad, giving the event a peloton of 144 cyclists at its outset. The favourites were: Vincenzo Nibali, Roman Kreuziger and Michele Scarponi, all of them preparing for the Giro d'Italia.

== Tour stages ==
=== Stage 1 ===
19 April 2011 – Riva del Garda to Arco, 13.4 km (8.3 mi)

Stage 1 results

	Cyclist	Team	Time
1	Andreas Klöden (GER)	Team RadioShack	15' 24"
2	Adriano Malori (ITA)	Lampre–ISD	+ 1"
3	Tiago Machado (POR)	Team RadioShack	+ 8"
4	Vincenzo Nibali (ITA)	Liquigas–Cannondale	+ 10"
5	Luca Ascani (ITA)	D'Angelo & Antenucci–Nippo	+ 11"
6	Alessandro De Marchi (ITA)	Androni Giocattoli	+ 16"
7	Scott Zwizanski (USA)	UnitedHealthcare	+ 21"
8	Stefan Schumacher (GER)	Miche–Guerciotti	+ 23"
9	Alessandro Ballan (ITA)	BMC Racing Team	+ 25"
10	Yaroslav Popovych (UKR)	Team RadioShack	+ 25"

General Classification after Stage 1

	Cyclist	Team	Time
1	Andreas Klöden (GER)	Team RadioShack	15' 24"
2	Adriano Malori (ITA)	Lampre–ISD	+ 1"
3	Tiago Machado (POR)	Team RadioShack	+ 8"
4	Vincenzo Nibali (ITA)	Liquigas–Cannondale	+ 10"
5	Luca Ascani (ITA)	D'Angelo & Antenucci–Nippo	+ 11"
6	Alessandro De Marchi (ITA)	Androni Giocattoli	+ 16"
7	Scott Zwizanski (USA)	UnitedHealthcare	+ 21"
8	Stefan Schumacher (GER)	Miche–Guerciotti	+ 23"
9	Alessandro Ballan (ITA)	BMC Racing Team	+ 25"
10	Yaroslav Popovych (UKR)	Team RadioShack	+ 25"

=== Stage 2 ===
20 April 2011 – Dro to Ledro Bezzecca, 184 km (114.3 mi)

Stage 2 results

	Cyclist	Team	Time
1	Thomas Voeckler (FRA)	Team Europcar	4h 47' 51"
2	Michele Scarponi (ITA)	Lampre–ISD	s.t.
3	Przemysław Niemiec (POL)	Lampre–ISD	+ 25"
4	Steve Morabito (SWI)	BMC Racing Team	s.t.
5	Fortunato Baliani (ITA)	D'Angelo & Antenucci–Nippo	s.t.
6	Paolo Tiralongo (ITA)	Astana	s.t.
7	Luca Ascani (ITA)	D'Angelo & Antenucci–Nippo	s.t.
8	José Serpa (COL)	Androni Giocattoli	s.t.
9	Vincenzo Nibali (ITA)	Liquigas–Cannondale	s.t.
10	Fabio Taborre (ITA)	Acqua & Sapone	s.t.

General Classification after Stage 2

	Cyclist	Team	Time
1	Michele Scarponi (ITA)	Lampre–ISD	5h 03' 36"
2	Tiago Machado (POR)	Team RadioShack	+ 12"
3	Vincenzo Nibali (ITA)	Liquigas–Cannondale	+ 14"
4	Luca Ascani (ITA)	D'Angelo & Antenucci–Nippo	+ 15"
5	Thomas Voeckler (FRA)	Team Europcar	+ 19"
6	Steve Morabito (SWI)	BMC Racing Team	+ 30"
7	Domenico Pozzovivo (ITA)	Colnago–CSF Inox	+ 31"
8	Robert Kišerlovski (CRO)	Astana	+ 38"
9	Vladimir Miholjević (CRO)	Acqua & Sapone	+ 40"
10	Charly Wegelius (GBR)	UnitedHealthcare	+ 40"

=== Stage 3 ===
21 April 2011 – Molina di Ledro to Fai della Paganella, 170 km (105.6 mi)

Stage 3 results

	Cyclist	Team	Time
1	Fabio Duarte (COL)	Geox–TMC	4h 41' 05"
2	Tiago Machado (POR)	Team RadioShack	s.t.
3	Michele Scarponi (ITA)	Lampre–ISD	+ 3"
4	Steve Morabito (SWI)	BMC Racing Team	s.t.
5	Robert Kišerlovski (CRO)	Astana	s.t.
6	Domenico Pozzovivo (ITA)	Colnago–CSF Inox	s.t.
7	José Rujano (VEN)	Androni Giocattoli	+ 8"
8	Sylvester Szmyd (POL)	Liquigas–Cannondale	+ 15"
9	Giampaolo Caruso (ITA)	Team Katusha	s.t.
10	Luca Ascani (ITA)	D'Angelo & Antenucci–Nippo	+ 17"

General Classification after Stage 3

	Cyclist	Team	Time
1	Michele Scarponi (ITA)	Lampre–ISD	9h 44' 40"
2	Tiago Machado (POR)	Team RadioShack	+ 7"
3	Luca Ascani (ITA)	D'Angelo & Antenucci–Nippo	+ 33"
4	Steve Morabito (SWI)	BMC Racing Team	+ 34"
5	Domenico Pozzovivo (ITA)	Colnago–CSF Inox	+ 35"
6	Robert Kišerlovski (CRO)	Astana	+ 42"
7	Vladimir Miholjević (CRO)	Acqua & Sapone	+ 58"
8	Thomas Voeckler (FRA)	Team Europcar	+ 1' 12"
9	Sylvester Szmyd (POL)	Liquigas–Cannondale	+ 1' 14"
10	José Rujano (VEN)	Team RadioShack	+ 1' 18"

=== Stage 4 ===
22 April 2011 – Andalo to Madonna di Campiglio, 161.5 km (100.4 mi)

Stage 4 results

	Cyclist	Team	Time
1	Roman Kreuziger (CZE)	Astana	4h 09' 03"
2	Emanuele Sella (ITA)	Androni Giocattoli	s.t.
3	Yaroslav Popovych (UKR)	Team RadioShack	+ 8"
4	Thomas Voeckler (FRA)	Team Europcar	+ 24"
5	Tiago Machado (POR)	Team RadioShack	s.t.
6	Michele Scarponi (ITA)	Lampre–ISD	s.t.
7	Luca Ascani (ITA)	D'Angelo & Antenucci–Nippo	s.t.
8	José Rujano (VEN)	Androni Giocattoli	s.t.
9	Fabio Duarte (COL)	Geox–TMC	s.t.
10	Domenico Pozzovivo (ITA)	Colnago–CSF Inox	s.t.

General Classification after Stage 4

	Cyclist	Team	Time
1	Michele Scarponi (ITA)	Lampre–ISD	13h 54' 07"
2	Tiago Machado (POR)	Team RadioShack	+ 7"
3	Luca Ascani (ITA)	D'Angelo & Antenucci–Nippo	+ 33"
4	Domenico Pozzovivo (ITA)	Colnago–CSF Inox	+ 33"
5	Steve Morabito (SWI)	BMC Racing Team	+ 38"
6	Robert Kišerlovski (CRO)	Astana	+ 42"
7	Thomas Voeckler (FRA)	Team Europcar	+ 1' 12"
8	José Rujano (VEN)	Androni Giocattoli	+ 1' 18"
9	Vladimir Miholjević (CRO)	Acqua & Sapone	+ 1' 35"
10	Fabio Duarte (COL)	Geox–TMC	+ 1' 42"
