= 2011 Critérium International =

2010–11 UCI Europe Tour
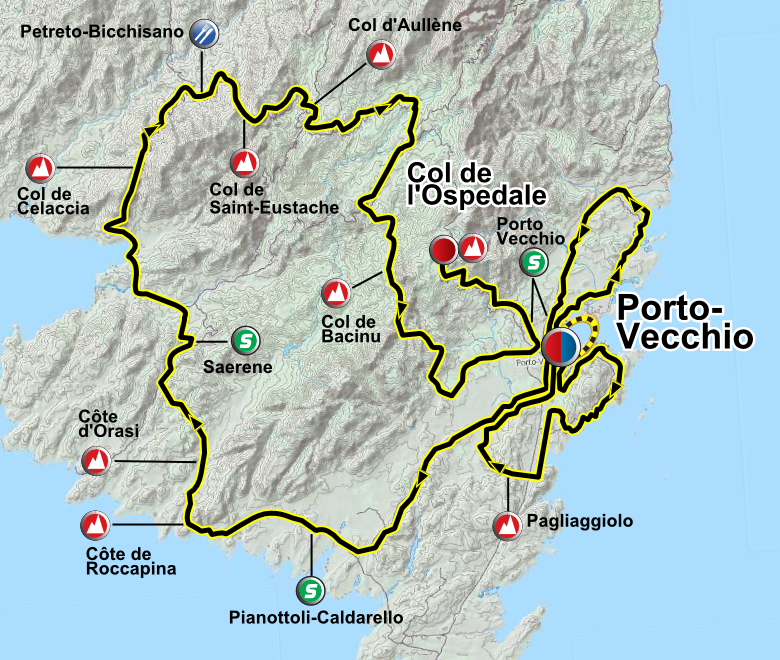
- The route of the 2011 Critérium International

Race details
- Dates: 26–27 March
- Stages: 3
- Distance: 280 km (174.0 mi)
- Winning time: 7h 13' 12"

Results
Jersey awarded to the overall winner	Winner	Fränk Schleck (Luxembourg)	(Leopard Trek)
	Second	Vasil Kiryienka (Belarus)	(Movistar Team)
	Third	Rein Taaramäe (Estonia)	(Cofidis)
Jersey awarded to the points classification winner	Points	Vasil Kiryienka (Belarus)	(Movistar Team)
Jersey awarded to the mountains classification winner	Mountains	Pim Ligthart (Netherlands)	(Vacansoleil–DCM)
Jersey awarded to the youth classification winner	Youth	Rein Taaramäe (Estonia)	(Cofidis)
	Team	Movistar Team	

The 2011 Critérium International was the 80th edition of the Critérium International cycling stage race. It started on 26 March in Porto-Vecchio and ended on 27 March in Porto-Vecchio and consisted of 3 stages, including 2 stages on the same day; a flat stage and an individual time trial, held as the second and third stages.

The race was won by Leopard-Trek rider Fränk Schleck, who claimed the leader's yellow jersey after a strong finish in the first stage, and maintained his advantage to the end of the race. Schleck's winning margin over runner-up Vasil Kiryienka of Team Movistar was 13 seconds, and Cofidis' Rein Taaramäe completed the podium, 17 seconds down on Kiryienka.

In the race's other classifications, Kiryienka won the green jersey for the points classification, the King of the Mountains classification was won by Pim Ligthart of Vacansoleil–DCM, Taaramäe won the young rider classification, and Movistar finished at the head of the teams classification.

== Pre-race favourites ==
The winner of the 2010 Critérium International, Pierrick Fédrigo, was looking to defend the previous year's victory, while other pre-race favourites included 2 time runner-up in the Tour de France Andy Schleck and Vuelta a España 5th place, Fränk Schleck, as well as Alexander Vinokourov.

== Teams ==
The following teams participated in the 2011 edition of the Critérium International:

UCI ProTour Teams

- Ag2r–La Mondiale
- Astana
- Euskaltel–Euskadi
- Garmin–Cervélo
- Leopard Trek
- Movistar Team
- Team RadioShack
- Team Sky
- Vacansoleil–DCM

UCI Professional Continental Teams

- Team Europcar
- Bretagne–Schuller
- Cofidis
- FDJ
- Saur–Sojasun
- Skil–Shimano

UCI Continental Teams

- BigMat–Auber 93

== Stages ==
=== Stage 1 ===
26 March 2011 – Porto-Vecchio to Col de l'Ospedale, 198 km

Stage 1 Results

	Rider	Team	Time
1	Fränk Schleck (LUX)	Leopard Trek	5h 21' 02"
2	Vasil Kiryienka (BLR)	Movistar Team	+ 16"
3	Rein Taaramäe (EST)	Cofidis	+ 22"
4	David López García (ESP)	Movistar Team	+ 58"
5	Alexandre Geniez (FRA)	Skil–Shimano	+ 1'00"
6	Sergey Lagutin (UZB)	Vacansoleil–DCM	+ 1'09"
7	Lars Petter Nordhaug (NOR)	Team Sky	+ 1'09"
8	Pierre Rolland (FRA)	Team Europcar	+ 1'09"
9	Pierrick Fédrigo (FRA)	FDJ	+ 1'09"
10	Andy Schleck (LUX)	Leopard Trek	+ 1'09"

General Classification after Stage 1

	Rider	Team	Time
1	Fränk Schleck (LUX)	Leopard Trek	5h 20' 52"
2	Vasil Kiryienka (BLR)	Movistar Team	+ 20"
3	Rein Taaramäe (EST)	Cofidis	+ 28"
4	David López García (ESP)	Movistar Team	+ 1'08"
5	Alexandre Geniez (FRA)	Skil–Shimano	+ 1'10"
6	Sergey Lagutin (UZB)	Vacansoleil–DCM	+ 1'19"
7	Lars Petter Nordhaug (NOR)	Team Sky	+ 1'19"
8	Pierre Rolland (FRA)	Team Europcar	+ 1'19"
9	Pierrick Fédrigo (FRA)	FDJ	+ 1'19"
10	Andy Schleck (LUX)	Leopard Trek	+ 1'19"

=== Stage 2 ===
27 March 2011 – Porto-Vecchio 75 km

Stage 2 Results

	Rider	Team	Time
1	Simon Geschke (GER)	Skil–Shimano	1h 43' 10"
2	Murilo Antonio Fischer (BRA)	Garmin–Cervélo	+ 0"
3	Laurent Mangel (FRA)	Saur–Sojasun	+ 0"
4	Florian Vachon (FRA)	Bretagne–Schuller	+ 0"
5	Arnaud Molmy (FRA)	BigMat–Auber 93	+ 0"
6	Jonathan Hivert (FRA)	Saur–Sojasun	+ 0"
7	Julien El Farès (FRA)	Cofidis	+ 0"
8	Tony Gallopin (FRA)	Cofidis	+ 0"
9	Fabian Wegmann (GER)	Leopard Trek	+ 0"
10	Jérôme Cousin (FRA)	Team Europcar	+ 0"

General Classification after Stage 2

	Rider	Team	Time
1	Fränk Schleck (LUX)	Leopard Trek	7h 04' 02"
2	Vasil Kiryienka (BLR)	Movistar Team	+ 20"
3	Rein Taaramäe (EST)	Cofidis	+ 28"
4	David López García (ESP)	Movistar Team	+ 1'08"
5	Alexandre Geniez (FRA)	Skil–Shimano	+ 1'10"
6	Cyril Gautier (FRA)	Team Europcar	+ 1'19"
7	Sergey Lagutin (UZB)	Vacansoleil–DCM	+ 1'19"
8	Pierre Rolland (FRA)	Team Europcar	+ 1'19"
9	Ryder Hesjedal (CAN)	Garmin–Cervélo	+ 1'19"
10	Jean-Christophe Péraud (FRA)	Ag2r–La Mondiale	+ 1'19"

=== Stage 3 ===
27 March 2011 – Porto-Vecchio 7 km

Stage 3 Results

	Rider	Team	Time
1	Andreas Klöden (GER)	Team RadioShack	8' 47"
2	Bradley Wiggins (GBR)	Team Sky	+ 04"
3	Jakob Fuglsang (DEN)	Leopard Trek	+ 10"
4	David Zabriskie (USA)	Garmin–Cervélo	+ 14"
5	Andrew Talansky (USA)	Garmin–Cervélo	+ 15"
6	Jérôme Coppel (FRA)	Saur–Sojasun	+ 16"
7	Maxime Monfort (BEL)	Leopard Trek	+ 16"
8	Vasil Kiryienka (BLR)	Movistar Team	+ 17"
9	Tiago Machado (POR)	Team RadioShack	+ 20"
10	Anthony Roux (FRA)	FDJ	+ 21"

General Classification after Stage 3

	Rider	Team	Time
1	Fränk Schleck (LUX)	Leopard Trek	7h 13' 12"
2	Vasil Kiryienka (BLR)	Movistar Team	+ 13"
3	Rein Taaramäe (EST)	Cofidis	+ 30"
4	Alexandre Geniez (FRA)	Skil–Shimano	+ 1'14"
5	Tiago Machado (POR)	Team RadioShack	+ 1'15"
6	Jean-Christophe Péraud (FRA)	Ag2r–La Mondiale	+ 1'16"
7	Ryder Hesjedal (CAN)	Garmin–Cervélo	+ 1'19"
8	Pierrick Fédrigo (FRA)	FDJ	+ 1'23"
9	David López García (ESP)	Movistar Team	+ 1'25"
10	Sergey Lagutin (UZB)	Vacansoleil–DCM	+ 1'25"

== Classification leadership ==
Stage	Winner	General classification	Mountains classification	Points classification	Young rider classification	Team Classification
1	Fränk Schleck	Fränk Schleck	Pim Ligthart	Fränk Schleck	Rein Taaramäe	Movistar Team
2	Simon Geschke	Fränk Schleck	Pim Ligthart	Fränk Schleck	Rein Taaramäe	Movistar Team
3	Andreas Klöden	Fränk Schleck	Pim Ligthart	Vasil Kiryienka	Rein Taaramäe	Movistar Team
Final		Fränk Schleck	Pim Ligthart	Vasil Kiryienka	Rein Taaramäe	Movistar Team
