= 2010 Volta ao Algarve =

Race details
- Dates: 17–21 February 2010
- Stages: 5
- Distance: 724 km (449.9 mi)
- Winning time: 19h 57' 48"

Results
Jersey awarded to the overall winner	Winner	Alberto Contador (ESP)	(Astana)
	Second	Luis León Sánchez (ESP)	(Caisse d'Epargne)
	Third	Tiago Machado (POR)	(Team RadioShack)
Jersey awarded to the points classification winner	Points	André Greipel (GER)	(Team HTC–Columbia)
Jersey awarded to the mountains classification winner	Mountains	Jérôme Baugnies (BEL)	(Topsport Vlaanderen–Mercator)
Jersey awarded to the sprints classification winner	Sprints	Thomas De Gendt (BEL)	(Topsport Vlaanderen–Mercator)
	Team	Team RadioShack	

The 2010 Volta ao Algarve was the 36th edition of the Volta ao Algarve cycling stage race. It was held from 17 to 21 February 2010, and was rated as a 2.1 event on the UCI Europe Tour. It started at the Algarve Stadium in Faro and ended with an individual time trial in Portimão.

This edition of the race was noted as a race which was targeted by many notable riders as their first of the season. Among these riders beginning 2010 in Portugal was reigning Tour de France champion (and defending Volta ao Algarve champion) Alberto Contador.

== Teams and cyclists ==
There were 23 teams in the 2010 Volta ao Algarve. Among them were 12 UCI ProTour teams, five UCI Professional Continental teams, and six Continental teams. Each team was allowed eight riders on their squad, but Garmin–Transitions sent only seven, giving the event a peloton of 183 cyclists at its outset.

The 23 teams in the race were:

UCI ProTour Teams

- Astana
- Caisse d'Epargne
- Euskaltel–Euskadi
- Footon–Servetto–Fuji
- Française des Jeux
- Garmin–Transitions
- Omega Pharma–Lotto
- Quick-Step
- Rabobank
- Team HTC–Columbia
- Team Katusha
- Team RadioShack

UCI Professional Continental Teams

- Cervélo TestTeam
- Cofidis
- Topsport Vlaanderen–Mercator
- Vacansoleil
- Xacobeo–Galicia

UCI Continental Teams

- An Post–Sean Kelly
- Barbot–Siper
- C C Loulé–Louletano
- LA–Rota dos Móveis
- Madeinvox–Boavista
- Palmeiras Resort–Tavira

Many notable riders contested the event as their first or one of their first of the season. This was the first race since the 2009 Tour de France for Astana's Alberto Contador. Thor Hushovd from Cervélo TestTeam intended to make his debut earlier in the season, at the Étoile de Bessèges, but illness forced him to delay his season debut. Euskaltel–Euskadi's Samuel Sánchez and the Garmin-Transitions pair of Christian Vande Velde and David Zabriskie also made their first appearances of 2010 in this event, while for Caisse d'Epargne's Luis León Sánchez it was his second, after the Tour Down Under. The RadioShack squad did not include Lance Armstrong, but the new American team did send Levi Leipheimer and Andreas Klöden, with both making their European debuts for 2010 in this race.

== Tour stages ==
=== Stage 1 ===
17 February 2010 – Algarve Stadium to Albufeira, 157.5 km (97.9 mi)

The Volta kicked off with an undulating stage, including two categorized climbs between the 60 km (37 mi) and 100 km (62 mi) marks but mostly flat thereafter.

Though the stage seemed set to end with a mass sprint finish, Française des Jeux' Benoît Vaugrenard put in a winning attack 700 m (2,300 ft) from the finish line, foiling the hopes of, among others, Team HTC–Columbia sprint ace André Greipel. Vaugrenard's attack came moments after Joan Horrach of Team Katusha tried a similar move, but was unable to maintain first position all the way to the line as Vaugrenard was.

Stage 1 results

	Cyclist	Team	Time
1	Benoît Vaugrenard (FRA)	Française des Jeux	4h 10' 42"
2	Joan Horrach (ESP)	Team Katusha	+ 3"
3	André Greipel (GER)	Team HTC–Columbia	+ 5"
4	Mathieu Ladagnous (FRA)	Française des Jeux	s.t.
5	Nick Nuyens (BEL)	Rabobank	s.t.
6	Wouter Weylandt (BEL)	Quick-Step	s.t.
7	Rui Costa (POR)	Caisse d'Epargne	s.t.
8	Heinrich Haussler (GER)	Cervélo TestTeam	s.t.
9	Samuel Sánchez (ESP)	Euskaltel–Euskadi	s.t.
10	Jens Keukeleire (BEL)	Cofidis	s.t.

General Classification after Stage 1

	Cyclist	Team	Time
1	Benoît Vaugrenard (FRA)	Française des Jeux	4h 10′ 32″
2	Joan Horrach (ESP)	Caisse d'Epargne	+ 7"
3	André Greipel (GER)	Team HTC–Columbia	+ 11"
4	Jérôme Baugnies (BEL)	Topsport Vlaanderen–Mercator	+ 11"
5	Luís Pinheiro (POR)	Madeinvox–Boavista	+ 13"
6	Mathieu Ladagnous (FRA)	Team Sky	+ 15″
7	Nick Nuyens (BEL)	Rabobank	+ 15″
8	Wouter Weylandt (BEL)	Quick-Step	+ 15"
9	Rui Costa (POR)	Caisse d'Epargne	+ 15"
10	Heinrich Haussler (GER)	Cervélo TestTeam	+ 15"

=== Stage 2 ===
18 February 2010 – Sagres to Lagos, 207.5 km (128.9 mi)

The second stage was similar in profile to the first, jagged with several short climbs. Four of the hills awarded points toward the mountains classification.

This stage was marked by heavy rainfall that made for tough riding for the peloton. Despite a profile that did not seem that it would break the field up so much, 78 riders finished more than ten minutes behind the stage winner, and 28 of them more than twenty minutes back. Thirteen did not finish the stage at all.

With four others, Footon–Servetto–Fuji's David Vitoria broke away 12 km (7.5 mi) into the stage. The rain and the hilly terrain took its toll on them as it did the peloton, and by 30 km (19 mi) to go only Vitoria remained out front. His advantage at that point was 3' 30", which meant there was a chance he could win the stage. In a finish reminiscent of the first stage, when Vaugrenard denied the sprinters, Vitoria stayed away into the stage's final kilometer. He was, however, caught by Greipel 200 m (660 ft) from the finish line. The German from Team HTC–Columbia took the stage win and, by virtue of the time bonuses it afforded, the overall leadership.

Stage 2 results

	Cyclist	Team	Time
1	André Greipel (GER)	Team HTC–Columbia	6h 06' 39"
2	Jürgen Roelandts (BEL)	Omega Pharma–Lotto	s.t.
3	Samuel Sánchez (ESP)	Euskaltel–Euskadi	+ 4"
4	Jens Keukeleire (BEL)	Cofidis	+ 6"
5	Björn Leukemans (BEL)	Vacansoleil	s.t.
6	José Joaquín Rojas (ESP)	Caisse d'Epargne	s.t.
7	Joaquim Rodríguez (ESP)	Team Katusha	s.t.
8	Johan Coenen (BEL)	Topsport Vlaanderen–Mercator	s.t.
9	Benoît Vaugrenard (FRA)	Française des Jeux	s.t.
10	Francesco Reda (ITA)	Quick-Step	s.t.

General Classification after Stage 2

	Cyclist	Team	Time
1	André Greipel (GER)	Team HTC–Columbia	10h 17′ 12″
2	Benoît Vaugrenard (FRA)	Caisse d'Epargne	+ 5"
3	Jürgen Roelandts (BEL)	Omega Pharma–Lotto	+ 8"
4	Joan Horrach (ESP)	Team Katusha	+ 12"
5	Samuel Sánchez (ESP)	Euskaltel–Euskadi	+ 14"
6	Jens Keukeleire (BEL)	Cofidis	+ 20″
7	José Joaquín Rojas (ESP)	Caisse d'Epargne	+ 20″
8	Mathieu Ladagnous (FRA)	Française des Jeux	+ 20"
9	Björn Leukemans (BEL)	Vacansoleil	+ 20"
10	Ryder Hesjedal (CAN)	Garmin–Transitions	+ 20"

=== Stage 3 ===
19 February 2010 – Castro Marim to Malhão, 173.7 km (107.9 mi)

The third stage was difficult, with four categorized climbs coming in the final 40 km (25 mi), including a summit stage finish.

Repeated early crashes in this stage sent Gert Steegmans, Manuel Cardoso, and Sandy Casar out of the race and to hospitals, though all escaped serious injury. The Astana team, in particular David de la Fuente, did strong pacemaking, trying to thin the field and set up their leader Alberto Contador for victory. Xacobeo–Galicia's Nelson Oliviera was the last rider brought back in from the morning escape, just as the ascent to the stage-ending Alto do Malhão began. On this climb, Contador put in the attack that separated him from the field and gave him the stage victory, with the Team RadioShack duo of Tiago Machado and Contador's former teammate Levi Leipheimer the next two behind him on the road. Contador also became the third straight stage winner to pull on the yellow jersey as race leader.

Stage 3 results

	Cyclist	Team	Time
1	Alberto Contador (ESP)	Astana	5h 02' 55"
2	Tiago Machado (POR)	Team RadioShack	+ 11"
3	Levi Leipheimer (USA)	Team RadioShack	+ 22"
4	Peter Velits (SVK)	Team HTC–Columbia	+ 25"
5	Tejay van Garderen (USA)	Team HTC–Columbia	s.t.
6	Jean-Christophe Péraud (FRA)	Omega Pharma–Lotto	+ 29"
7	Samuel Sánchez (ESP)	Euskaltel–Euskadi	+ 31"
8	Rui Costa (POR)	Caisse d'Epargne	+ 33"
9	Luis León Sánchez (ESP)	Caisse d'Epargne	s.t.
10	Andreas Klöden (GER)	Team RadioShack	s.t.

General Classification after Stage 3

	Cyclist	Team	Time
1	Alberto Contador (ESP)	Astana	15h 20′ 17″
2	Tiago Machado (POR)	Team RadioShack	+ 15"
3	Levi Leipheimer (USA)	Team RadioShack	+ 28"
4	Samuel Sánchez (ESP)	Euskaltel–Euskadi	+ 35"
5	Tejay van Garderen (USA)	Team HTC–Columbia	+ 35"
6	Rui Costa (POR)	Caisse d'Epargne	+ 43″
7	Luis León Sánchez (ESP)	Caisse d'Epargne	+ 43″
8	Matthew Lloyd (AUS)	Omega Pharma–Lotto	+ 43"
9	Andreas Klöden (GER)	Team RadioShack	+ 43"
10	Joaquim Rodríguez (ESP)	Team Katusha	+ 43"

=== Stage 4 ===
20 February 2010 – Cacela to Tavira, 169 km (105 mi)

Stage 4 had a sloping profile, with a high climb coming at the 106.7 km (66.3 mi) mark. Many kilometers of descending followed to the finish line.

After 20 km (12 mi) of racing, a six-man breakaway formed. Its complexion changed after the first climb of the day, when three riders were dropped and three bridged from the peloton up to the leading group. The best-placed man in the breakaway was Caisse d'Epargne's Imanol Erviti, who began the stage 5' 11" behind race leader Contador. The Astana team never let the break get more than five minutes' advantage, content to otherwise let the stage be decided among those riders. The six finished scattered as they crossed the finish line, with Team RadioShack's Sébastien Rosseler securing their first-ever victory, exactly three minutes ahead of the peloton, and Quick-Step's Iljo Keisse in sixth just ten seconds ahead of the main field. There was no significant change to the race's general classification after the stage.

Stage 4 results

	Cyclist	Team	Time
1	Sébastien Rosseler (BEL)	Team RadioShack	4h 12' 46"
2	Mickaël Delage (FRA)	Omega Pharma–Lotto	+ 20"
3	Imanol Erviti (ESP)	Caisse d'Epargne	s.t.
4	Preben Van Hecke (NED)	Topsport Vlaanderen–Mercator	s.t.
5	Egoi Martínez (ESP)	Euskaltel–Euskadi	+ 24"
6	Iljo Keisse (BEL)	Quick-Step	+ 2' 50"
7	André Greipel (GER)	Team HTC–Columbia	+ 3' 00"
8	Wouter Weylandt (BEL)	Omega Pharma–Lotto	s.t.
9	Samuel Caldeira (POR)	Palmeiras Resort–Prio–Tavira	s.t.
10	Graeme Brown (AUS)	Rabobank	s.t.

General Classification after Stage 4

	Cyclist	Team	Time
1	Alberto Contador (ESP)	Astana	19h 36′ 03″
2	Tiago Machado (POR)	Team RadioShack	+ 15"
3	Levi Leipheimer (USA)	Team RadioShack	+ 28"
4	Samuel Sánchez (ESP)	Euskaltel–Euskadi	+ 35"
5	Tejay van Garderen (USA)	Team HTC–Columbia	+ 35"
6	Rui Costa (POR)	Caisse d'Epargne	+ 43″
7	Luis León Sánchez (ESP)	Caisse d'Epargne	+ 43″
8	Matthew Lloyd (AUS)	Omega Pharma–Lotto	+ 43"
9	Andreas Klöden (GER)	Team RadioShack	+ 43"
10	Joaquim Rodríguez (ESP)	Team Katusha	+ 43"

=== Stage 5 ===
21 February 2010 – Laguna to Portimão, 17.2 km (10.7 mi) (individual time trial)

The race's individual time trial is straightforward, with only three curves in the road and several long straightaways, along with a negligible change in elevation. One wrinkle was thrown into the race, however, two days before the time trial was run. The UCI disallowed the Specialized Shiv time trial bike. This affected both the Astana and Saxo Bank teams, who both ride Specialized bikes, but most notably race leader Contador. Specialized delivered the teams a different model of team trial bike to the teams for use in the stage.

Caisse d'Epargne rider Luis León Sánchez won this time trial, with a time of 21'32". Contador, atop a Specialized Transitions bike instead of the Shiv he had expected to use, was second, 13 seconds slower than Sánchez. He still had more than enough time in hand to win the race overall. Caisse d'Epargne and Team RadioShack both showed well in the time trial, with three riders each in the top ten.

Stage 5 results

	Cyclist	Team	Time
1	Luis León Sánchez (ESP)	Caisse d'Epargne	21' 32"
2	Alberto Contador (ESP)	Astana	+ 13"
3	Sébastien Rosseler (BEL)	Team RadioShack	+ 16"
4	Levi Leipheimer (USA)	Team RadioShack	+ 22"
5	František Raboň (CZE)	Team HTC–Columbia	+ 23"
6	Tiago Machado (POR)	Team RadioShack	+ 30"
7	Samuel Sánchez (ESP)	Euskaltel–Euskadi	+ 35"
8	Rui Costa (POR)	Caisse d'Epargne	+ 44"
9	Imanol Erviti (ESP)	Caisse d'Epargne	+ 46"
10	Maarten Tjallingii (NED)	Rabobank	+ 48"

Final General Classification

	Cyclist	Team	Time
1	Alberto Contador (ESP)	Astana	19h 57′ 48″
2	Luis León Sánchez (ESP)	Caisse d'Epargne	+ 30"
3	Tiago Machado (POR)	Team RadioShack	+ 32"
4	Levi Leipheimer (USA)	Team RadioShack	+ 37"
5	Samuel Sánchez (ESP)	Euskaltel–Euskadi	+ 57"
6	Rui Costa (POR)	Caisse d'Epargne	+ 1' 11″
7	František Raboň (CZE)	Team HTC–Columbia	+ 1' 16″
8	Andreas Klöden (GER)	Team RadioShack	+ 1' 25"
9	Tejay van Garderen (USA)	Team HTC–Columbia	+ 1' 33"
10	Peter Velits (SVK)	Team HTC–Columbia	+ 1' 45"

== Classification leadership ==
In the 2010 Volta ao Algarve, five different jerseys were awarded. For the general classification, calculated by adding each cyclist's finishing times on each stage, and allowing time bonuses for the first three finishers on each stage and in intermediate sprints, the leader received a yellow jersey. This classification was considered the most important of the Volta ao Algarve, and the winner is considered the winner of the Volta.

Additionally, there was a sprints classification, which awarded a blue jersey. In the sprints classification, cyclists got points for finishing in the top three in an intermediate sprint. The first across the sprint points got 3 points, the second got 2, and the third got a single point.

There was also a mountains classification, which awarded a green jersey. In the mountains classification, points were won by reaching the top of a mountain before other cyclists. Each climb was categorized, with the more difficult climbs awarding more points.

The points classification awarded a white jersey. In the points classification, cyclists got points based on the order at the finish line of each stage. The stage win afforded 25 points, second on the stage was worth 20, third 16, fourth 13, fifth 10, sixth 8, seventh 6, eighth 4, ninth 2, and tenth was worth a single point. The points awarded in the sprints classification counted equivalently for this classification.

The fifth jersey was distinct to this race – it was for the best Portuguese rider. There were eleven Portuguese riders in the race, who competed amongst themselves for a pink jersey.

The race also awarded a teams classification, which was not represented by a jersey. The teams classification was calculated by adding the times of each team's best three riders per stage per day.

Stage	Winner	General Classification	Mountains Classification	Sprints Classification	Points Classification	Portuguese Rider Classification	Teams Classification
1	Benoît Vaugrenard	Benoît Vaugrenard	Jérôme Baugnies	Hugo Sabido	Benoît Vaugrenard	Rui Costa	Française des Jeux
2	André Greipel	André Greipel	Jérôme Baugnies	Hugo Sabido	André Greipel	Rui Costa	Team HTC–Columbia
3	Alberto Contador	Alberto Contador	Jérôme Baugnies	Thomas De Gendt	André Greipel	Tiago Machado	Team RadioShack
4	Sébastien Rosseler	Alberto Contador	Jérôme Baugnies	Thomas De Gendt	André Greipel	Tiago Machado	Team RadioShack
5	Luis León Sánchez	Alberto Contador	Jérôme Baugnies	Thomas De Gendt	André Greipel	Tiago Machado	Team RadioShack
Final		Alberto Contador	Jérôme Baugnies	Thomas De Gendt	André Greipel	Tiago Machado	Team RadioShack
