= Tiago Machado =

Portuguese cyclist

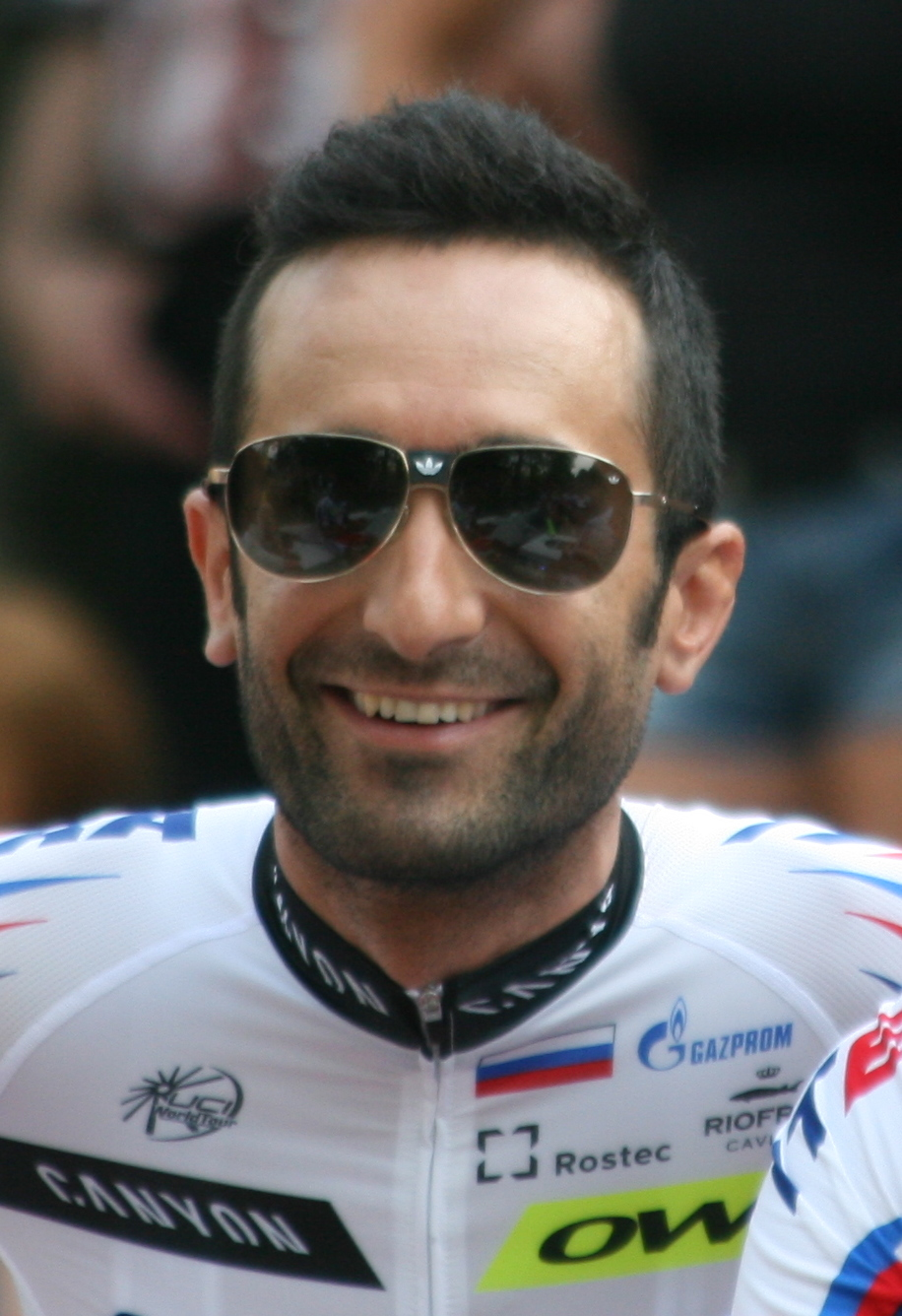
- Machado at the 2015 Tour de France

Personal information
- Full name: Tiago José Pinto Machado
- Born: 18 October 1985 (age 40) Vila Nova de Famalicão, Portugal
- Height: 1.78 m (5 ft 10 in)
- Weight: 63 kg (139 lb)

Cycling career
- Sport: Cycling
- Current team: Retired
- Discipline: Road
- Role: Rider
- Rider type: All-rounder

Professional teams
- 2005–2009: Carvalhelhos–Boavista
- 2010–2011: Team RadioShack
- 2012–2013: RadioShack–Nissan
- 2014: NetApp–Endura
- 2015–2018: Team Katusha
- 2019: Sporting / Tavira
- 2020: Efapel
- 2021–2022: Rádio Popular–Boavista

Major wins
- One-day races and Classics National Time Trial Championships (2009)

Tiago José Pinto Machado (born 18 October 1985) is a Portuguese former professional road racing cyclist, who rode professionally between 2005 and 2022 for seven different teams. He took three victories during his career – the 2009 Portuguese National Time Trial Championships, a stage at the 2010 Circuit de la Sarthe, and the general classification at the 2014 Tour of Slovenia.

== Career ==
Machado was born in Vila Nova de Famalicão.

=== NetApp–Endura (2014) ===
After spending two seasons with RadioShack–Leopard, Machado joined NetApp–Endura for the 2014 season. Following a successful start of the season, which saw him winning the overall classification of the Tour of Slovenia, his first Category 2.1 overall win, Machado started the Tour de France for the first time in his career. Machado had a strong start, and was third overall after nine stages. On stage ten, Machado crashed badly on a descent 96 kilometres (60 miles) from the finish, sliding down the road for about 100 metres (330 feet). After being checked by the doctors and when he was expected to abandon the race, he ordered his team to give him back his bicycle, climbed 3 mountains and arrived to the finishing line last, 43 minutes behind the day's winner, Vincenzo Nibali. He was sutured after the stage, and despite arriving outside the time limit, the commissaires allowed Machado to continue on the race due to his efforts. French newspaper L'Équipe described Machado's effort as "heroic".

=== Team Katusha (2015–2018) ===
Machado left NetApp–Endura after the 2014 campaign and joined Team Katusha on an initial two-year contract. He signed a contract extension for the 2017 season in October 2016.

=== Return to Portuguese teams (2019–22) ===
Having ridden at UCI World Tour level for eight of the previous nine seasons, Machado dropped down to UCI Continental level with Sporting / Tavira in 2019. He rode for Efapel in 2020, before moving to Rádio Popular–Boavista for the 2021 season; he had made his professional début with the team in 2005 when it was known as Carvalhelhos–Boavista.

At the 2022 Portuguese National Road Championships, Machado announced that he would retire from cycling at the end of the season.

== Personal life ==
Machado is a supporter of S.L. Benfica.

== Major results ==
2006
9th Overall GP CTT Correios de Portugal
2007
1st Young rider classification, Volta a Portugal
2nd Overall Grand Prix du Portugal
4th Overall Troféu Joaquim Agostinho
6th Overall Volta ao Algarve
2008
1st Overall Troféu Joaquim Agostinho
National Road Championships

2nd Time trial
2nd Road race

4th Overall Volta ao Alentejo
5th Overall Vuelta a Extremadura
9th Overall Volta a Portugal

1st Young rider classification

2009
1st Time trial, National Road Championships
2nd Overall Vuelta a Asturias
2nd Overall Troféu Joaquim Agostinho
4th Overall Volta ao Algarve
4th Overall GP CTT Correios de Portugal
5th Overall Vuelta a Extremadura
5th Overall Volta a Portugal

1st Young rider classification

6th Overall Volta ao Alentejo
2010
2nd Overall Circuit de la Sarthe

1st Stage 2b (ITT)

3rd Overall Volta ao Algarve

1st Portuguese rider classification

3rd Overall Critérium International

1st Young rider classification

4th Overall Tour of Austria
6th Overall Tour de Romandie
7th Overall Vuelta a Castilla y León
10th Overall Tour de Pologne
2011
2nd Overall Giro del Trentino
5th Overall Critérium International
5th Overall Volta ao Algarve
7th Overall Tirreno–Adriatico
2012
3rd Overall Tour Down Under
5th Overall Vuelta a Castilla y León
5th Trofeo Deià
6th Overall Volta ao Algarve
8th Overall Tour de Pologne
9th Overall Tour of California
2013
1st Mountains classification, Tour de Wallonie
2nd Road race, National Road Championships
4th Overall Driedaagse van West-Vlaanderen
6th Overall Volta ao Algarve
9th Overall Tour Down Under
10th Overall Tour of Utah
2014
1st Overall Tour of Slovenia
2nd Vuelta a Murcia
3rd Road race, National Road Championships
3rd Overall Critérium International
4th Overall Tour of California
6th Overall Giro del Trentino
9th Clásica de Almería
9th Coppa Bernocchi
2015
National Road Championships

2nd Time trial
3rd Road race

2nd Overall Bayern Rundfahrt
3rd Overall Volta ao Algarve

1st Portuguese rider classification

4th Overall Circuit de la Sarthe
7th Vuelta a Murcia
2016
8th Overall Circuit de la Sarthe
Combativity award Stages 5 & 11 Vuelta a España
2017
10th Clássica Aldeias do Xisto
2018
National Road Championships

3rd Time trial
4th Road race

2020
3rd Time trial, National Road Championships

=== Grand Tour general classification results timeline ===
Grand Tour	2011	2012	2013	2014	2015	2016	2017	2018
Giro d'Italia	19	—	36	—	—	—	—	—
Tour de France	—	—	—	72	72	—	74	—
Vuelta a España	32	40	—	—	36	85	—	79
