= Matthew Busche =

American cyclist (born 1985)

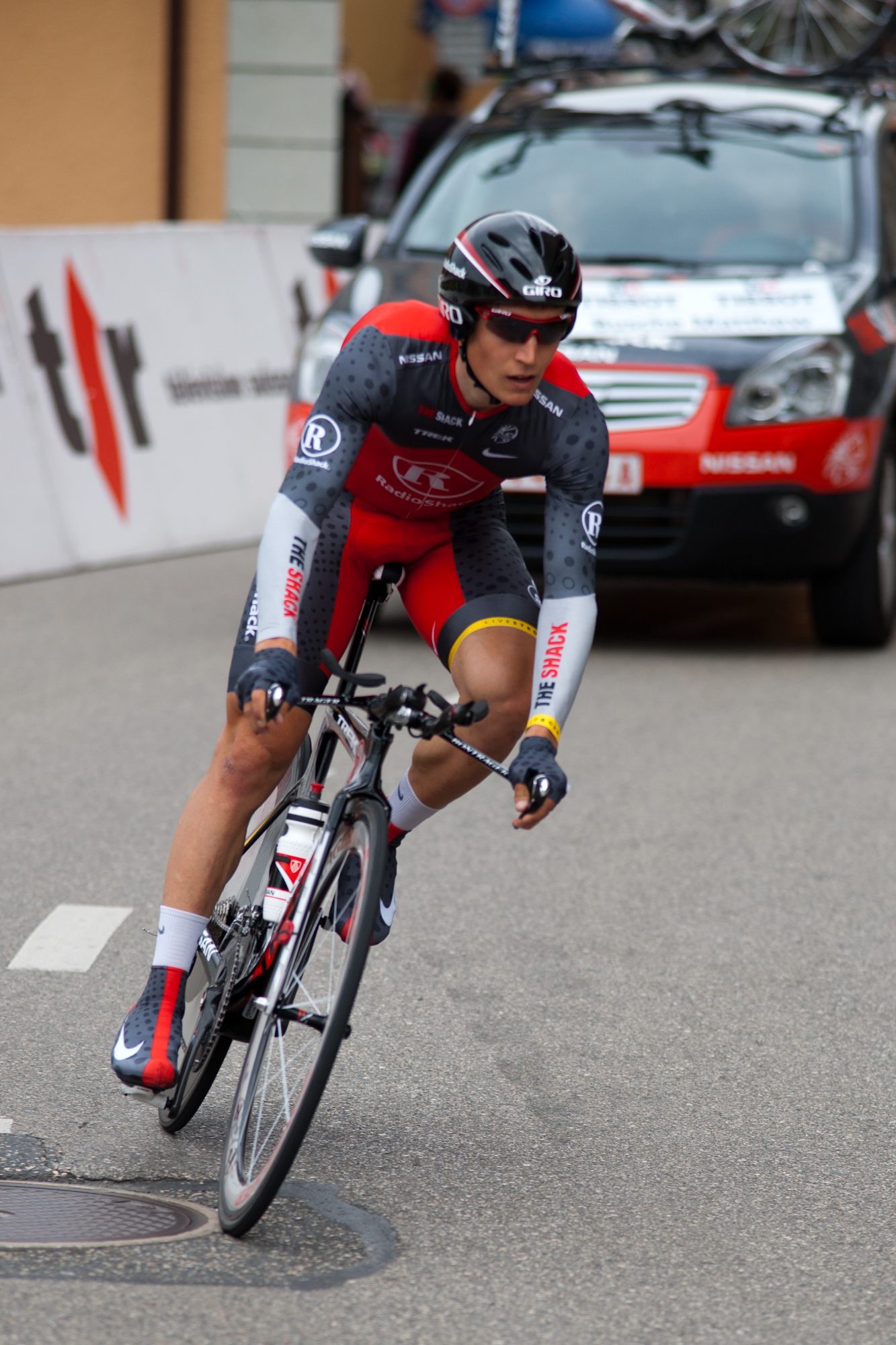
- Busche at the 2010 Tour de Romandie.

Personal information
- Full name: Matthew Craig Busche
- Born: May 9, 1985 (age 41) Wauwatosa, Wisconsin, U.S.
- Height: 1.74 m (5 ft 8 1/2 in)
- Weight: 68 kg (150 lb)

Cycling career
- Sport: Cycling
- Discipline: Road
- Role: Rider
- Rider type: All-rounder

Professional teams
- 2009: Kelly Benefit Strategies
- 2010–2011: Team RadioShack
- 2012–2015: RadioShack–Nissan
- 2016: UnitedHealthcare

Major wins
- One-day races and classics National Road Race Championships (2011, 2015)

Matthew Busche (born May 9, 1985) is an American former professional road racing cyclist, who rode professionally between 2009 and 2016 for the Kelly Benefit Strategies, Team RadioShack, Trek Factory Racing and UnitedHealthcare teams. In 2009, he gained notoriety for his rapid rise from a Wisconsin-based amateur team to Team RadioShack within the course of one season. Busche was the winner of the 2011 and 2015 United States National Road Race Championships.

== Biography ==
Busche, son of Craig and Cindy Busche, grew up in Wauwatosa, Wisconsin and is a graduate of Luther College in Decorah, Iowa. He got his start in endurance sports as a runner, and first took up cycling in 2005 as a form of cross-training during a running injury. He was a two-time NCAA All-American cross country athlete, and the 2007 Iowa Conference MVP. Completing his college running career in 2007, Busche switched his focus to cycling and joined the ISCorp amateur cycling team. During his second season of racing in 2009, Busche rode as a stagiaire for Pro-Continental team Kelly Benefits Strategies, and was later offered a contract with UCI ProTour team, Team RadioShack. Busche spent two years with Team RadioShack and moved with a number of riders to the former Leopard Trek team to form RadioShack–Nissan for the 2012 season.

On December 15, 2016, Busche announced his retirement from professional cycling.

== Personal life ==
Busche currently lives in Brevard, North Carolina with his wife, Lisa.

== Major results ==
2009
5th Road race, National Road Championships
7th Overall Tour of Utah
9th Overall Univest Grand Prix
2010
3rd Overall Danmark Rundt
5th Time trial, National Road Championships
2011
National Road Championships

1st Road race
3rd Time trial

2012
2nd Overall Tour of Utah
8th Overall USA Pro Cycling Challenge
2013
4th Gran Premio Città di Camaiore
5th Overall Tour of Utah
6th Overall Tour of California
7th Overall Tour of Austria
2014
5th Overall USA Pro Cycling Challenge
2015
1st Road race, National Road Championships
1st Stage 1 (TTT) Tour of Alberta
2016
7th Overall Tour of the Gila
8th The Reading 120
9th Winston-Salem Cycling Classic

Sporting positions
Preceded by Ben King	United States National Road Race Championships; Winner; 2011	Succeeded by Timmy Duggan
