= Bjørn Selander =

American racing cyclist

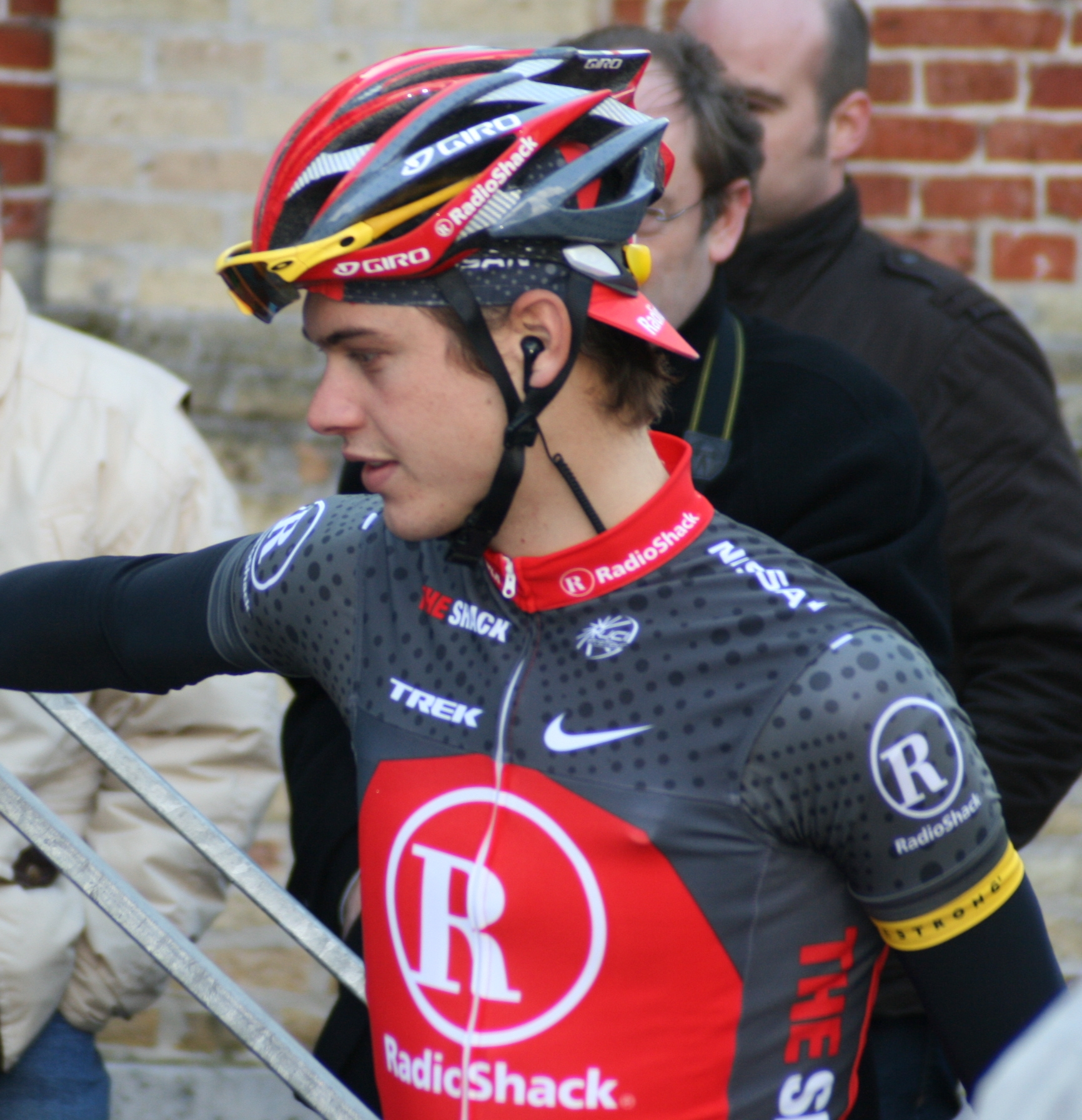

Personal information
- Full name: Bjørn Kristian Selander
- Born: January 28, 1988 (age 38) Hudson, Wisconsin, U.S.
- Height: 1.80 m (5 ft 11 in)
- Weight: 72 kg (159 lb)

Cycling career
- Sport: Cycling
- Current team: Human Powered Health
- Discipline: Road
- Role: Rider
- Rider type: Domestique

Amateur team
- 2008: United States National Team

Professional teams
- 2009: Trek–Livestrong
- 2010–2011: Team RadioShack
- 2012: SpiderTech–C10
- 2013–2016: Optum–Kelly Benefit Strategies
- 2016-2017: Borah Teamwear/Bingham Built
- 2018-: Donkey Label Cycling

Bjørn Kristian Selander (born January 28, 1988) is an American professional road racing cyclist of Norwegian descent. Selander currently rides cyclocross for Donkey Label Cycling. Selander completed his first and only Giro in 2011, wearing the white jersey after Stages 1 and 2, and placing 128th overall.

== Major results ==
2008
1st, Stages 1 & 3 (TTT), Tour of Belize
2009
2nd, National U23 Time Trial Championships
5th, Overall, Tour de Beauce
7th, Univest Grand Prix
2017
8th, Gran Prix of Gloucester, Day 2
