= Andreas Klöden =

German cyclist (born 1975)

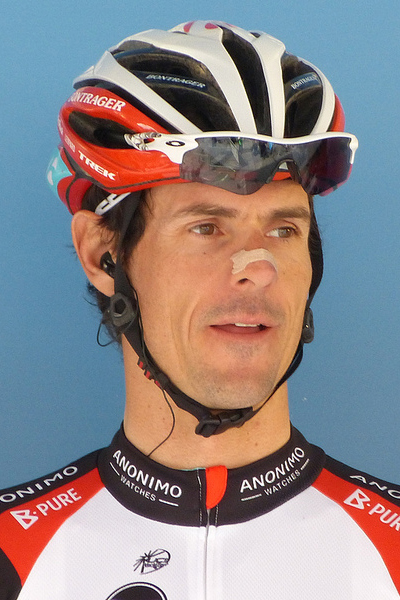

Personal information
- Full name: Andreas Klöden
- Nickname: Klödi
- Born: 22 June 1975 (age 51) Mittweida, Bezirk Karl-Marx-Stadt, East Germany
- Height: 1.83 m (6 ft 0 in)
- Weight: 63 kg (139 lb; 9 st 13 lb)

Cycling career
- Sport: Cycling
- Discipline: Road
- Role: Rider
- Rider type: All-rounder

Professional teams
- 1998–2006: Team Telekom
- 2007–2009: Astana
- 2010–2011: Team RadioShack
- 2012–2013: RadioShack–Nissan

Major wins
- Grand Tours Tour de France 1 TTT stage (2009) Stage races Paris–Nice (2000) Tour of the Basque Country (2000, 2011) Tirreno–Adriatico (2007) Tour de Romandie (2008) One-day races and Classics National Road Race Championships (2004)
Medal record
Representing Germany
Men's road bicycle racing
Olympic Games
Bronze medal – third place	2000 Sydney	Road Race
Road World Championships
Bronze medal – third place	1996 Lugano	Under-23 Time Trial

Andreas Klöden (born 22 June 1975) is a German former professional road bicycle racer, who competed as a professional between 1998 and 2013. His major achievements include a bronze medal at the 2000 Olympic Games and finishing second in the general classification at the 2004 and 2006 Tour de France. Klöden was a tall, lightly built racer with enough strength to place high in the overall classifications of the Grand Tours, but his performances were affected by injuries.

== Biography ==
Klöden was born in Mittweida in 1975. Before he turned professional, he won the bronze medal in the Under 23 World Time Trial Championships in 1996, and two stages at the International Rheinland-Pfalz Rundfahrt in 1997.

=== The T-Mobile years (1998–2006) ===
Klöden signed with Team Telekom (later T-Mobile Team) in 1998, and in his first pro season he won the Niedersachsen-Rundfahrt's General classifications (GC) and the prologue of the Tour de Normandie. In 1999, he won a stage at the Portuguese Tour of Algarve. But the first of his great seasons came in 2000, where after notching two important victories in the GC of Paris–Nice and Tour of the Basque Country, he went on to obtain the bronze medal at the 2000 Sydney Olympics, after fellow German Jan Ullrich and Kazakh Alexander Vinokourov, two riders with whom he would spend several seasons on T-Mobile.

After that came three injury plagued seasons in which he gained no victories. He was forced to abandon the 2003 Tour de France due to a fractured tailbone. 2004 saw his cycling rebirth as he won the German National Road Racing Championships and so continued T-Mobile/Team Telekom's winning streak, which went back to Bernd Gröne's 1993 win of these Championships. Klöden held his great moment of form until the Tour de France, which began one week later. In that Tour, which he began as a domestique for Ullrich, he did not win any stage but finished second overall after taking second place from Italian Ivan Basso in the final time trial. Ullrich, whom Klöden was supposed to be supporting, finished fourth that year, the only time he finished outside the top three in the Tour de France. Finishing ahead of Ullrich brought Klöden international fame and rumours circulated that he was moving to Gerolsteiner or Illes Balears–Banesto, where he would have led the team, but instead he stayed at T-Mobile with Ullrich.

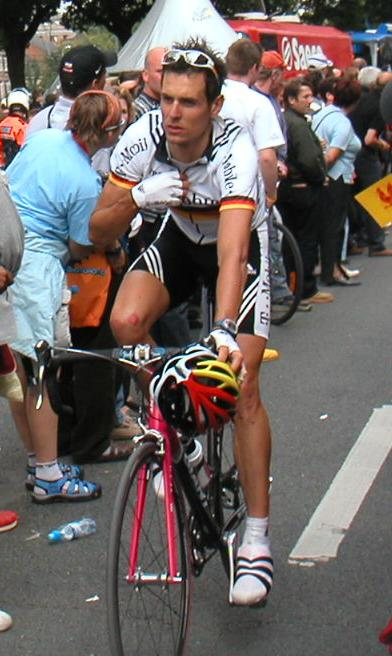
Klöden at the 2004 Tour de France.

In the 2005 season he won a stage at the Bayern-Rundfahrt. Klöden as well as teammates Ullrich and Vinokourov were considered among the challengers for the 2005 Tour de France overall victory, with Ullrich as the strongest bid. Klöden contributed to the team success of T-Mobile in the race that saw Ullrich finish 3rd and Vinokourov finish fifth. On stage 8 in the Vosges Mountains, he attacked halfway up the final climb of the day and eventually took the K.O.M. points, catching breakaway leader Pieter Weening right at the summit. On the way down to the finish in Geradmer, he lost the sprint finish in the closest Tour de France finish of all time – (9.6 millimetres or 0.0002 secs) until stage 7 of the 2017 Tour de France when Marcel Kittel beat Edvald Boasson Hagen ( 4.0 millimetres or 0.00003 secs). Later, he withdrew from the Tour at stage 17 into Revel, having crashed during the 16th stage and fracturing a bone in his right wrist.

In the Tour of 2006, Klöden became one of the favorites for the overall victory when Ullrich, Vinokourov and Basso did not start. Vinokourov did not participate because of his teammates doping scandal, which caused his Astana team to fall below the minimum six riders to start. After somewhat weak performances in the first mountain stages, Klöden was in good shape in the Alps, climbing in the overall ranking. Klöden was very strong in the first long time trial where he finished second after his teammate Serhiy Honchar, climbing from fourth to the third place in the general classification over Carlos Sastre. On stage 11 to the Pla D'Beret, Klöden was dropped by the leading group and lost about 1:30mins, which cost him dearly. On Stage 15, he performed strongly, dropping everyone, except eventual overall winner Floyd Landis. On Stage 16, Kloden again performed well, finishing fourth on the stage, however on stage 17, he again cracked on the Col de Joux Plane, but recovered on the descent, thanks mainly to the help given to him by teammate Patrik Sinkewitz.

=== The Astana years (2007–2009) ===
On 27 August 2006, Klöden announced that he would ride for Astana in the 2007 season, although Alexander Vinokourov was the team captain. This announcement came as something of a surprise to the cycling community because Klöden, despite his talent and accomplishments, would almost certainly not be the leader of that team, which was organized around Vinokourov. During the Tour de France, he rode well, but had to help Astana captain Vinokourov, and lost a few minutes. An accident almost saw the repeat of his 2003 Tour injury, but this time the injury to the coccyx was just a hairline fracture and he was able to continue. Astana formally withdrew from the 2007 Tour de France on 24 July, when Vinokourov's doping test was found to be positive.

His racing in September was interrupted by injury, following an accident while out training when a car crossed his path forcing him to swerve, Klöden ended up in a ditch. Although an X-ray showed no broken bones, he missed the GP de Plouay and the Tour of Poland.

His 2008 season was uneventful in grand tours though he won the Tour of Romandie that year and he came second in the Tour de Suisse. His 2009 Tour de France was mainly serving as a domestique for Alberto Contador and Lance Armstrong though after stage 15 Kloden sat 4th overall. Kloden's podium chances closed in however on stage 17 when his teammate Alberto Contador put in a controversial attack dropping Kloden allowing the Andy and Fränk Schleck to gain over 2 minutes over him. He would later end up finishing 6th overall that year though he would end up moving into 5th overall after Lance Armstrong's titles were stripped.

On 2 October 2009 it was confirmed that Klöden would join Team RadioShack for the 2010 season

=== 2009 Doping allegations ===
In 2009 allegations emerged claiming that Andreas Klöden used the Freiburg University Clinic for an illegal blood transfusion during the 2006 Tour de France. Later, Klöden and others of the T-Mobile Team, Matthias Kessler and Patrick Sinkewitz were confirmed by Freiburg doctors to have blood doped at the university during the 2006 Tour de France where their blood was held. Under investigation, Klöden made an agreement with German prosecutors to pay a sum to charity in return for the investigation being dropped.

At his retirement, Klöden denied that he was ever doping. He said he had made an agreement with prosecutors to stop the investigation because he felt that the investigation hindered his career.

=== The Team Radioshack Years (2010–2011) ===
Klöden had an uneventful 2010 season. He finished the 2010 Tour de France in 14th place 16’36" behind Contador. Contador was later disqualified, resulting in a 13th place 15'57' behind Andy Schleck. His other biggest finishes were 8th in Tour de Suisse and Eneco Tour.

2011 saw a rebirth of Klöden's career when he won the 2011 Tour of the Basque Country while also finished 2nd in Paris–Nice and getting a stage victory. He also had 2 ITT victories in Giro del Trentino and Critérium International. He carried his good form into the 2011 Tour de France but crashed and had to withdraw because of two crashes that injured his back. He later entered the Vuelta as co-leader with Brajkovic but withdrew.

=== RadioShack-Nissan (2012–2013) ===
In 2012, Klöden signed with RadioShack-NissanTrek. He finished the 2012 Tour de France in 11th place, 17'54" behind Wiggins. He also finished 4th in the USA Pro Cycling Challenge.

Klöden continued to ride for Radioshack in 2013. He finished 9th in both the 2013 Volta ao Algarve and 2013 Paris–Nice early on in the season. His first top five finish came in the 2013 Tour of Belgium, where he finished fourth. He lost time early on in the Pyrenees in the 2013 Tour de France, forcing him to switch his goals from the general classification to stage wins. He made the breakaway on stage 16 to Gap, finishing in fifth place. He tried his luck again on stage 19 to Le Grand-Bornand. After finishing second there in the 2004 Tour de France behind Lance Armstrong; he finished second again, this time after Rui Costa who had also won the stage to Gap. He finished the Tour in 30th place, 1h02'43" behind winner Chris Froome.

In October 2013, Klöden announced his retirement from cycling after a sixteen-year professional career.

== Career achievements ==
=== Major results ===
1996
3rd Time trial, UCI Road World Under-23 Championships
1997
1st Prologue & Stage 7b Rheinland-Pfalz Rundfahrt
1st Stage 3 Flèche du Sud
1st Stage 4 Commonwealth Bank Classic
7th Time trial, UCI Road World Under-23 Championships
7th HEW Cyclassics
9th Overall Circuit Cycliste Sarthe
1998
1st Overall Niedersachsen Rundfahrt

1st Stage 3a

1st Prologue Tour de Normandie
1999
1st Stage 3 Volta ao Algarve
5th Overall Regio-Tour
2000
1st Overall Tour of the Basque Country

1st Stage 5b

1st Overall Paris–Nice

1st Stage 7

1st Stage 7 Peace Race
2nd Overall Deutschland Tour
2nd Overall Danmark Rundt
3rd Road race, Olympic Games
3rd Overall Regio-Tour
5th EnBW GP
5th Overall Setmana Catalana
2001
5th EnBW GP
8th Grand Prix Eddy Merckx
2002
2nd Overall Regio-Tour
5th Overall Sachsen Tour
2003
4th Overall Critérium International
7th Overall Tirreno–Adriatico
2004
1st Road race, National Road Championships
2nd Overall Tour de France
2nd Overall Bayern Rundfahrt
6th La Flèche Wallonne
6th Overall Deutschland Tour
2005
1st Stage 5 Bayern Rundfahrt
2006
1st Overall Regio-Tour

1st Stage 4

2nd Overall Tour de France
2007
1st Overall Tirreno–Adriatico
1st Overall Circuit Cycliste Sarthe

1st Stage 2

5th Overall Critérium International
5th Overall Bayern Rundfahrt
10th Overall Tour de Suisse
2008
1st Overall Tour de Romandie

1st Stage 3

2nd Overall Tour de Suisse
8th Overall Volta ao Algarve
2009
1st Stage 1 (ITT) Giro del Trentino
2nd Overall Tour de Luxembourg
3rd Overall Tirreno–Adriatico

1st Stage 5

4th Overall Tour de Suisse
5th Overall Tour de France

1st Stage 4 (TTT)

5th Overall Volta ao Algarve
2010
4th Overall Vuelta a Murcia
8th Overall Tour de Suisse
8th Overall Eneco Tour
8th Overall Volta ao Algarve
8th Overall Tour de Luxembourg
2011
1st Overall Tour of the Basque Country

1st Points classification

1st Stage 3 (ITT) Critérium International
1st Stage 1 (ITT) Giro del Trentino
2nd Overall Paris–Nice

1st Stage 5

5th Overall Volta ao Algarve
2012
4th Overall USA Pro Cycling Challenge
2013
4th Overall Tour of Belgium
9th Overall Volta ao Algarve
9th Overall Paris–Nice

==== General classification results timeline ====
Grand Tour general classification results
Grand Tour	1998	1999	2000	2001	2002	2003	2004	2005	2006	2007	2008	2009	2010	2011	2012	2013
Giro d'Italia	—	—	—	—	—	—	—	—	—	—	DNF	—	—	—	—	—
Tour de France	—	—	—	26	—	DNF	2	DNF	2	DNF	—	5	13	DNF	11	30
/ Vuelta a España	DNF	62	DNF	—	DNF	—	—	—	—	—	20	—	—	DNF	—	—
Major stage race general classification results
Race	1998	1999	2000	2001	2002	2003	2004	2005	2006	2007	2008	2009	2010	2011	2012	2013
/ Paris–Nice	—	—	1	DNF	DNF	—	—	—	—	—	—	—	—	2	18	9
/ Tirreno–Adriatico	—	—	—	—	—	7	77	90	129	1	—	3	—	—	—	—
Volta a Catalunya	—	DNF	DNF	DNF	—	61	—	—	—	—	—	—	23	—	—	—
Tour of the Basque Country	—	69	1	—	DNF	DNF	DNF	DNF	—	—	—	—	18	1	—	—
/ Tour de Romandie	—	—	—	53	—	—	—	—	—	—	1	—	—	—	22	—
Critérium du Dauphiné	—	—	—	—	—	—	—	DNF	—	—	—	—	—	—	—	—
Tour de Suisse	—	—	—	—	—	—	—	—	DNF	10	2	4	8	38	39	63

Legend
—	Did not compete
DNF	Did not finish
