= Sébastien Rosseler =

Belgian cyclist

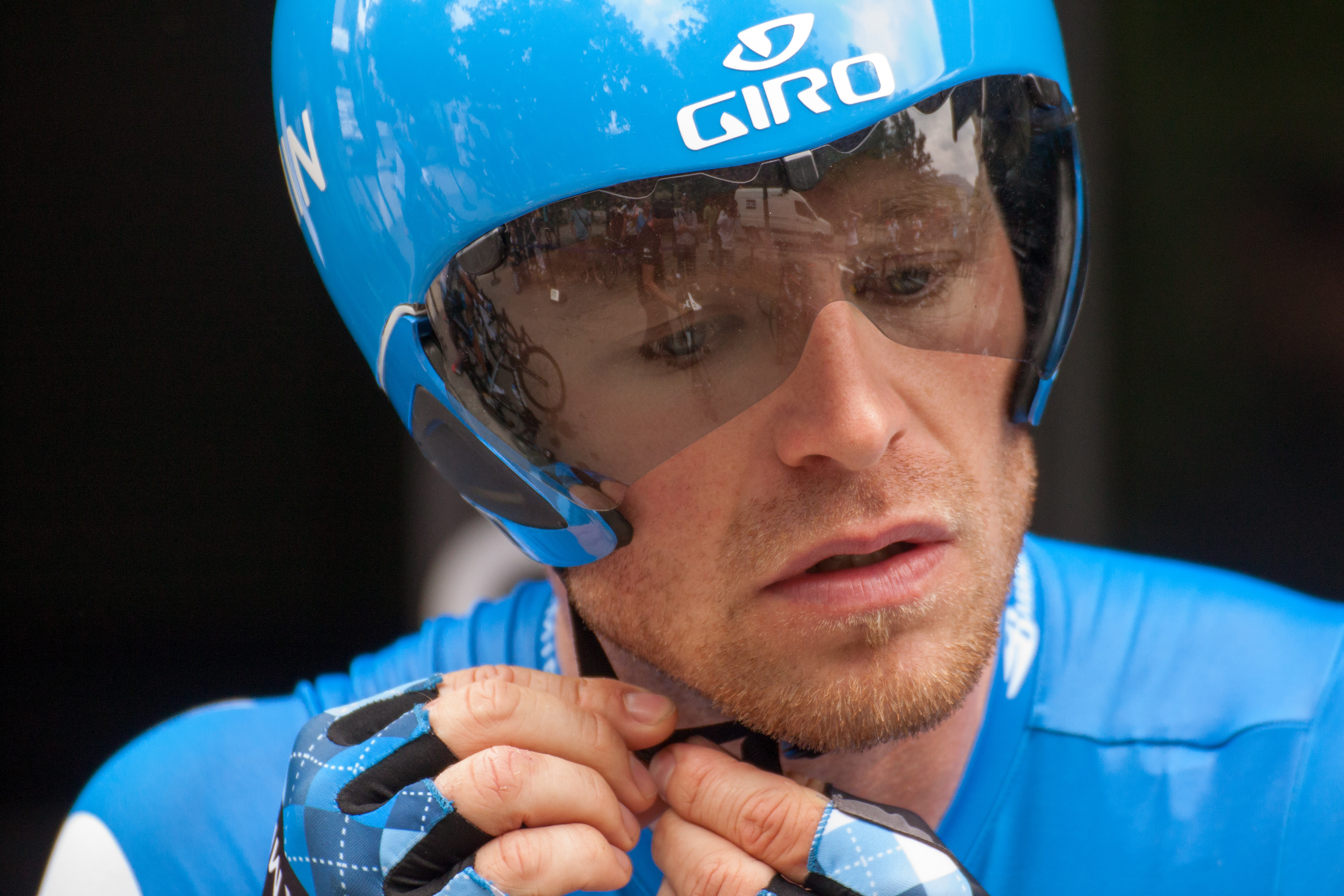
- Rosseler at the 2012 Critérium du Dauphiné

Personal information
- Full name: Sébastien Rosseler
- Nickname: Séba
- Born: 15 July 1981 (age 45) Verviers, Wallonia, Belgium
- Height: 1.82 m (6 ft 0 in)
- Weight: 77 kg (170 lb)

Cycling career
- Sport: Cycling
- Current team: Veranclassic-Doltcini
- Discipline: Road
- Role: Rider
- Rider type: Classics specialist

Professional teams
- 2002: → Domo–Farm Frites
- 2003: Quick-Step–Davitamon
- 2004: Relax–Bodysol
- 2005–2009: Quick-Step–Innergetic
- 2010–2011: Team RadioShack
- 2012–2013: Garmin–Barracuda
- 2014–2015: Veranclassic-Doltcini

Major wins
- Grand Tours Giro d'Italia 1 TTT stage (2012) Stage races Three Days of De Panne (2011) One-day races and Classics Brabantse Pijl (2010)

Sébastien Rosseler (born 15 July 1981) is a Belgian professional road racing cyclist who rides for Veranclassic-Doltcini. Between 2012 and 2013, Rosseler competed with UCI ProTeam Garmin–Barracuda. Born in Verviers, Wallonia, Belgium, Rosseler currently resides in Tongeren, Flanders, Belgium.

== Career achievements ==
=== Major results ===
2002
1st Overall Le Triptyque des Monts et Châteaux
2003
1st Overall Le Triptyque des Monts et Châteaux
Olympia's Tour

1st Points classification
1st Stages 1, 6 & 7 (ITT)

6th De Vlaamse Pijl
2004
8th Overall Four Days of Dunkirk
9th Gent–Wevelgem
2006
2nd Overall Tour of Belgium
3rd Halle–Ingooigem
4th Overall Three Days of De Panne
7th Overall Four Days of Dunkirk

1st Young rider classification

2007
1st Stage 1 (TTT) Tour of Qatar
4th Overall Tour of Belgium
4th Time trial, National Road Championships
6th Overall Three Days of De Panne
8th Overall Eneco Tour

1st Stage 5 (ITT)

2008
2nd Overall Circuit Franco–Belge

1st Stage 4

2nd Overall Eneco Tour
5th Paris–Brussels
8th Kampioenschap van Vlaanderen
2009
1st Stage 4 Four Days of Dunkirk
1st Stage 5 (ITT) Tour of Belgium
2nd Time trial, National Road Championships
2010
1st Brabantse Pijl
1st Stage 4 Volta ao Algarve
2nd Time trial, National Road Championships
2011
1st Overall Three Days of De Panne

1st Stage 3 (ITT)

2nd Overall Driedaagse van West-Vlaanderen
2012
1st Stage 4 (TTT) Giro d'Italia

=== Grand Tour general classification results timeline ===
Grand Tour	2006	2007	2008	2009	2010	2011	2012
Giro d'Italia	—	—	—	—	—	—	125
Tour de France	—	103	97	101	—	—	—
Vuelta a España	116	—	—	—	—	—	—

Legend
—	Did not compete
DNF	Did not finish
