= Team RadioShack =

American bicycle racing team (2010–2011)

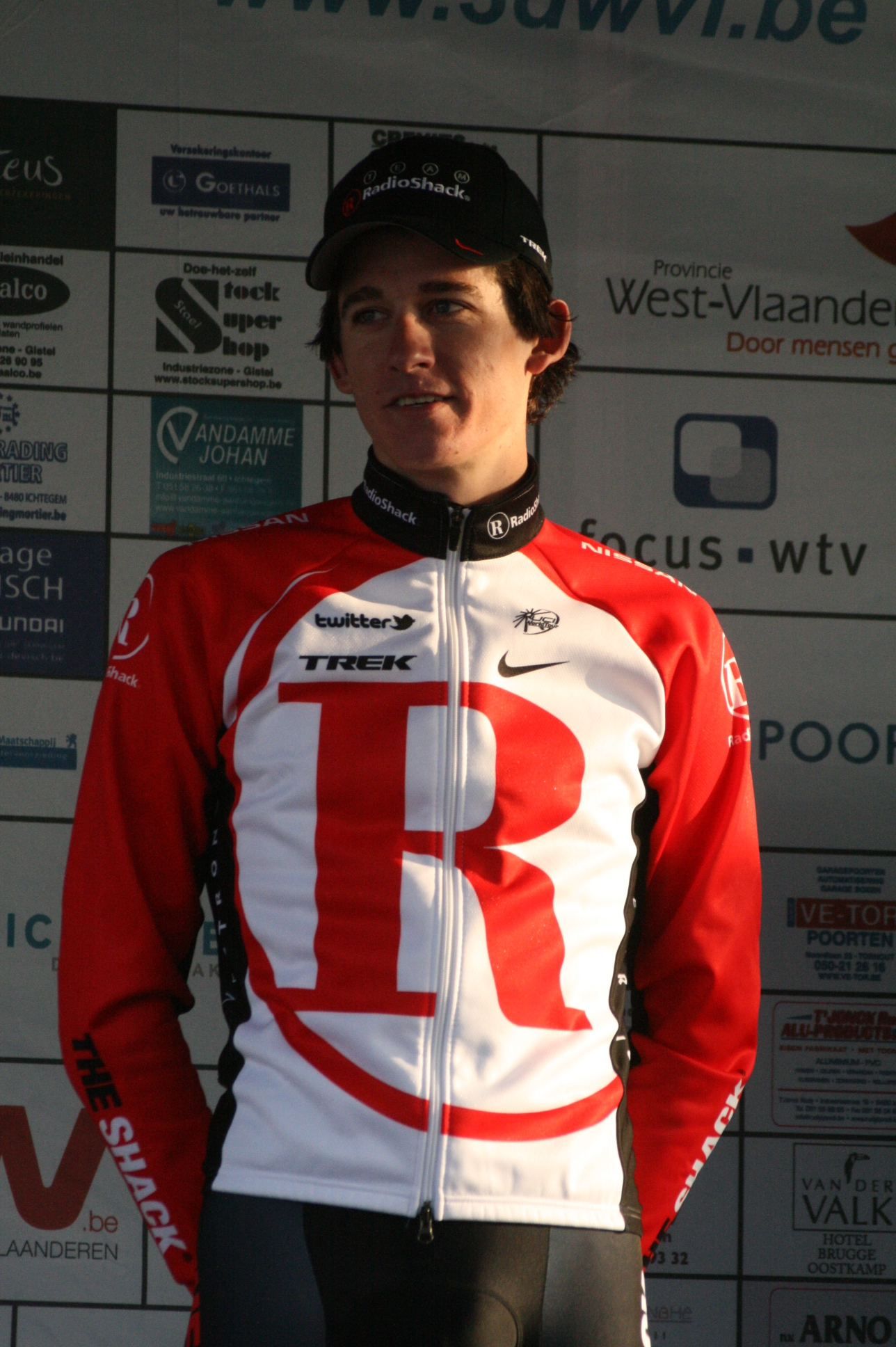

Team information
- UCI code: RSH
- Registered: United States
- Founded: 2010
- Disbanded: 2011
- Discipline: Road
- Status: UCI ProTeam
- Bicycles: Trek

Key personnel
- General manager: Johan Bruyneel
- Team manager: Dirk Demol

Team name history
Team RadioShack jersey
Jersey

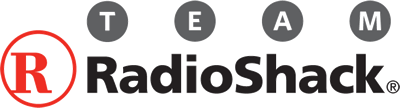

Team RadioShack was a professional road bicycle racing team, with RadioShack as the title sponsor, the creation of which was announced on July 23, 2009. Lance Armstrong co-owned and led the team, which raced in the Grand Tours and the UCI ProTour. The team was managed by Capital Sports and Entertainment, an Austin, Texas sports and event management group that also manages the Trek-Livestrong U23 development cycling team and that ran the former Discovery Channel Pro Cycling Team.

Johan Bruyneel was Team RadioShack's initial overall manager and Dirk Demol was the directeur sportif. Former Discovery Channel cyclists Viatcheslav Ekimov from Russia and José Azevedo from Portugal was also part of the managerial squad. Armstrong said that the team would promote the Livestrong anti-cancer campaigns of his Lance Armstrong Foundation, and will also be sponsored by Trek Bicycle Corporation, SRAM Corporation and Nike, Inc. sportswear.

The team ceased to exist in its current structure from the end of the 2011 season as Radioshack returned their World Tour Licence to the UCI. Their two main sponsors, RadioShack and Nissan, moved their sponsorship to Team Leopard Trek. Sporting Director Johan Bruyneel moved to the newly named RadioShack-Nissan team along with several of the current Radioshack riders. While effectively a merge, there is some debate between the two teams as to the nature of the agreement. Radioshack described it as a merge, while Flavio Becca, owner of Leopard Trek stated that his team was continuing, and simply taking over Radioshacks sponsors, and some of their riders. The new team was registered in Luxembourg with the UCI.

== Team history ==
=== 2010 ===
On November 25, 2009, The UCI ProTour Council (UPTC) announced that the team was successfully registered for the 2010 season The team's final 2010 team roster includes 26 riders from 16 countries, after Japanese rider Fumiyuki Beppu joined in February. Demol and twelve of the riders were previously with the Kazakh team XDS Astana Team in the UCI ProTour, including eight of the team's nine riders on the winning team in the 2009 Tour de France. In April 2010 Li Fuyu was suspended by the team after failing a doping test.

The team had planned on racing in the 2010 Tour de France and the 2010 Vuelta a España, among other races, but it controversially was not invited to the Vuelta. Team RadioShack went on to achieve the team victory of the 2010 Tour de France, while leading the team classification after about half its stages. It was the second time that an American team had won the team classification, preceded by Discovery Channel in 2007. After the Tour de France, the team promoted Taylor Phinney and Jesse Sergent from the Trek-Livestrong U23 team and Clinton Avery from the PWS Eijssen team to the RadioShack roster as "stagiaires" ("trainees" in French) for the remainder of the season.

=== 2011 ===
The 2011 season for Team RadioShack began in January at the Tour Down Under, and ended in October with Robbie McEwen's participation in the Noosa Grand Prix. As a UCI ProTeam, they were automatically invited and obligated to send a squad to every event in the UCI World Tour.

While the team had 28 wins in 2011, and showed well enough to briefly be the leading team in the UCI World Tour rankings, they were nearly invisible in the Grand Tours, the races which have defined manager Johan Bruyneel's managerial career. A Tour de France besieged by crashes and injuries led to Haimar Zubeldia in 15th place being their best finisher, the worst showing for a Bruyneel-led team at the Tour in five years. The team's principal successes were the three major stage races in the United States, the Tour of California, the Tour of Utah, and the USA Pro Cycling Challenge. Team RadioShack fielded the overall winner in all three events, Chris Horner in California and Levi Leipheimer in Utah and Colorado. The team also won seven other stage races, easily the most of any major team on the season.

== 2011 team roster ==
As at December 31, 2011.

Rider	Date of birth
Fumiyuki Beppu (JPN)	April 10, 1983 (aged 28)
Sam Bewley (NZL)	July 22, 1987 (aged 24)
Janez Brajkovič (SLO)	December 18, 1983 (aged 28)
Matthew Busche (USA)	May 9, 1985 (aged 26)
Manuel Cardoso (POR)	April 7, 1983 (aged 28)
Philip Deignan (IRE)	September 7, 1983 (aged 28)
Ben Hermans (BEL)	June 8, 1986 (aged 25)
Chris Horner (USA)	November 10, 1971 (aged 40)
Robert Hunter (RSA)	April 22, 1977 (aged 34)
Ben King (USA)	March 22, 1989 (aged 22)
Andreas Klöden (GER)	June 22, 1975 (aged 36)
Michał Kwiatkowski (POL)	June 2, 1990 (aged 21)
Markel Irizar (ESP)	February 5, 1980 (aged 31)
Levi Leipheimer (USA)	October 24, 1973 (aged 38)

Rider	Date of birth
Geoffroy Lequatre (FRA)	June 30, 1981 (aged 30)
Tiago Machado (POR)	October 18, 1985 (aged 26)
Jason McCartney (USA)	September 3, 1973 (aged 38)
Robbie McEwen (AUS)	June 24, 1972 (aged 39)
Dmitriy Muravyev (KAZ)	November 2, 1979 (aged 32)
Nelson Oliveira (POR)	March 6, 1989 (aged 22)
Sérgio Paulinho (POR)	March 26, 1980 (aged 31)
Yaroslav Popovych (UKR)	January 4, 1980 (aged 31)
Grégory Rast (SUI)	January 17, 1980 (aged 31)
Sébastien Rosseler (BEL)	July 15, 1981 (aged 30)
Ivan Rovny (RUS)	September 30, 1987 (aged 24)
Bjørn Selander (USA)	January 28, 1988 (aged 23)
Jesse Sergent (NZL)	July 8, 1988 (aged 23)
Haimar Zubeldia (ESP)	April 1, 1977 (aged 34)

=== 2012 Bontrager-Livestrong U23 team roster ===
As of December 31, 2012.

Rider	Date of birth
Joshua Atkins (NZL)	June 28, 1992 (aged 20)
Ian Boswell (USA)	February 7, 1991 (aged 21)
Nathan Brown (USA)	July 7, 1991 (aged 21)
Lawson Craddock (USA)	February 20, 1992 (aged 20)
Jasper De Buyst (BEL)	November 24, 1993 (aged 19)

Rider	Date of birth
Joseph Dombrowski (USA)	May 12, 1991 (aged 21)
Ryan Eastman (USA)	July 28, 1992 (aged 20)
Gavin Mannion (USA)	August 24, 1991 (aged 21)
Conor O'Leary (USA)	January 1, 1991 (aged 21)
Dale Parker (AUS)	May 12, 1992 (aged 20)
Jasper Stuyven (BEL)	April 17, 1992 (aged 20)

== List of wins ==
2010
Stage 4 Volta ao Algarve, Sébastien Rosseler

Portuguese rider classification, Tiago Machado
Teams classification

Teams classification Giro di Sardegna
Youth classification Critérium International, Tiago Machado

Teams classification

Stage 2b Circuit de la Sarthe, Tiago Machado
Overall Tour of the Basque Country, Chris Horner

Stage 6, Chris Horner

Brabantse Pijl, Sébastien Rosseler
Teams classification, Vuelta a Castilla y León
Teams classification, Tour de Romandie
Overall Tour of the Gila, Levi Leipheimer

Stage 1, Levi Leipheimer

Stage 5 Tour of Belgium, Ben Hermans
Teams classification Tour de Luxembourg
Overall Critérium du Dauphiné, Janez Brajkovič

Stage 4, Janez Brajkovič

Teams classification Tour of Austria
Teams classification Tour de France

Stage 10, Sergio Paulinho

Overall Tour de l'Ain, Haimar Zubeldia

Prologue, Haimar Zubeldia

Overall Tour of Utah, Levi Leipheimer

Prologue, Taylor Phinney
Stage 3, Levi Leipheimer

Stage 4 Tour du Poitou-Charentes, Markel Irizar
Prologue Tour de l'Avenir, Taylor Phinney
Leadville Trail 100 MTB, Levi Leipheimer
United States National Time Trial championships, Taylor Phinney
World U23 Road Race championships, Taylor Phinney
2011
Trofeo Inca-inca, Ben Hermans
Tour De Mumbai II, Robbie Hunter
Overall Vuelta a Andalucía Ruta ciclista del Sol, Markel Irizar
Overall Driedaagse van West-Vlaanderen, Jesse Sergent

Prologue Jesse Sergent

Stage 5 Paris–Nice, Andréas Klöden
Stage 4 Volta Ciclista a Catalunya, Manuel Cardoso
Stage 3 Critérium International, Andréas Klöden
Overall Three Days of De Panne, Sébastien Rosseler
Overall Tour of the Basque Country, Andréas Klöden
Stage 1 Giro del Trentino, Andréas Klöden
Overall Amgen Tour of California, Chris Horner

Stage 4, Chris Horner
Stage 7, Levi Leipheimer

United States National Road Race championships, Matthew Busche
Japan National Time Trial championships, Fumiyuki Beppu
Overall Tour de Suisse, Levi Leipheimer
Portugal National Time Trial championships, Nelson Oliveira
Japan National Road Racec championships, Fumiyuki Beppu
Slovenia National Time Trial championships, Janez Brajkovič
Stage 1 Tour of Austria, Robert Hunter
Stage 4 Tour de Wallonie, Robbie McEwen
Stage 5 Eneco Tour, Jesse Sergent
Overall Tour of Utah, Levi Leipheimer
Overall USA Pro Cycling Challenge, Levi Leipheimer

Stages 1 & 3, Levi Leipheimer

Overall Tour du Poitou-Charentes, Jesse Sergent

Stage 4, Jesse Sergent

Overall Tour de Wallonie-Picarde, Robbie McEwen

Stages 1 & 4, Robbie McEwen

=== Supplementary statistics ===
Grand Tours by highest finishing position
Race	2010	2011
Giro d'Italia	–	19
Tour de France	9	15
Vuelta a España	–	22
Major week-long stage races by highest finishing position
Race	2010	2011
Tour Down Under	24	15
Paris–Nice	11	2
Tirreno–Adriatico	–	7
Volta a Catalunya	9	3
Tour of the Basque Country	1	1
Tour de Romandie	5	7
Critérium du Dauphiné	1	9
Tour de Suisse	2	1
Tour de Pologne	9	18
Eneco Tour	8	9
Monument races by highest finishing position
Race	2010	2011
Milan–San Remo	14	23
Tour of Flanders	27	42
Paris–Roubaix	11	4
Liège–Bastogne–Liège	7	22
Giro di Lombardia	20	32
Classics by highest finishing position
Classic	2010	2011
Omloop Het Nieuwsblad	54	–
Kuurne–Brussels–Kuurne	9	–
Strade Bianche	–	–
E3 Harelbeke	16	41
Gent–Wevelgem	DNF	19
Amstel Gold Race	10	8
La Flèche Wallonne	7	17
Clásica de San Sebastián	4	6
Paris–Tours	3	7

== National championships ==
2010

USA Road Race Ben King
USA Time Trial Taylor Phinney
U23 World Road Race Taylor Phinney

2011

Japan Road Race Fumiyuki Beppu
Japan Time Trial Fumiyuki Beppu
USA Road Race Matthew Busche
Slovenia Time Trial Janez Brajkovič
Portugal Time Trial Nelson Oliveira
