= 2011 Veranda's Willems–Accent season =

2011 Veranda's Willems-Accent season

2011 Veranda's Willems–Accent season
Manager	Lucien Van Impe
One-day victories	2
Stage race overall victories	none
Stage race stage victories	3
Previous season • Next season

The 2011 season for the Veranda's Willems–Accent professional cycling team began in January at the Grand Prix d'Ouverture La Marseillaise and ended in October at the Nationale Sluitingsprijs. It was the squad's fourth season as a professional cycling team, although its first as a UCI Professional Continental team; having been part of the UCI Continental Circuits since their foundation in 2008, the team acquired a Professional Continental licence following meetings of the UCI Licence Commission in November 2010.

Thus, in order to compete in any UCI World Tour event, the team had to be invited in advance, by race organisers. Although the team was not selected to ride any of the three Grand Tours held in 2011, Veranda's Willems–Accent was invited to six World Tour races, all held in either the Netherlands or Belgium; Gent–Wevelgem, the Tour of Flanders, the Amstel Gold Race, La Flèche Wallonne, Liège–Bastogne–Liège – all single-day races held in either March or April – and the Eneco Tour, a stage race held in August.

Veranda's Willems-Accent took only five victories during the 2011 season, of which three came in summer stage races. Steven Caethoven took the final stage victory at the Delta Tour Zeeland in the Netherlands, while Stefan van Dijk and Jurgen Van Goolen won stages at the Route du Sud race, held in the south of France. The team also recorded no fewer than 28 top-ten placings in single-day races, including two victories for Evert Verbist at the Beverbeek Classic in February and Gregory Habeaux at Dwars door het Hageland in July. Although not winning any of the races, van Dijk was the team's most consistent performer, and ended the season in sixth place in the UCI Europe Tour points standings, while Staf Scheirlinckx took an eighth-place finish at World Tour level, in the Tour of Flanders.

== 2011 roster ==
In line with the squad's promotion to the second-tier of UCI-registered racing, Veranda's Willems–Accent were allowed to utilise more riders on their roster as a UCI Professional Continental team. As a UCI Continental team, the team was only allowed to have a maximum of sixteen riders on their roster at any one time, while at Professional Continental level, rosters could range from sixteen to twenty-five riders. Over the course of the season, the team had twenty full-time riders on their books – up from sixteen riders in 2010, with twelve riders joining the team and eight riders leaving – while An Post–Sean Kelly rider Dries Hollanders and Kevin Van Den Noortgate, a rider from amateur team EFC-Quick Step, joined the team in the second half of the season, on short-term contracts, serving as trainee riders or stagiaires. As such, many of the riders drafted in by the squad were experienced in the higher levels of the sport, having competed at ProTour and Professional Continental level; only two of the twelve new signings were aged 23 or under.

=== Riders in ===
Following the discontinuation of Team Milram at the end of the 2010 season, Belgian rider Wim De Vocht dropped down from the ProTour to join the team. Two riders also joined Veranda's Willems–Accent from another ProTour team; Staf Scheirlinckx, a domestique and former top-ten finisher at Paris–Roubaix in 2006, and Jurgen Van Goolen both joined from Omega Pharma–Lotto; Van Goolen had previously signed for the Pegasus Sports project, prior to folding before the 2011 season even started. Steven Caethoven and Arnoud Van Groen left their respective Professional Continental teams Landbouwkrediet and Vacansoleil to join Veranda's Willems–Accent, Under-23 riders Jaco Venter and Thomas Vernaeckt both competed at Continental level in 2010 for MTN–Energade and Sunweb-Revor respectively, but joined Veranda's Willems–Accent in the hopes of progressing eventually to the World Tour. Also joining the team were Jempy Drucker, Rob Goris, David Kemp, Bram Schmitz and Evert Verbist.

=== Riders out ===
Andy Cappelle was the team's most notable departure for the 2011 season; after winning the Polynormande race and a stage at the Rhône-Alpes Isère Tour, Cappelle left the team to join World Tour squad Quick-Step on a twelve-month contract. Fabio Polazzi, Robin Stenuit and Jonas Vangenechten all joined Wallonie Bruxelles–Crédit Agricole for the 2011 season, with Cédric Collaers (Lotto-Bodysol), Sven Renders (Team Worldofbike.gr) and Hendrik Van Den Bossche (Donckers Koffie-Jelly Belly) all acquiring contracts for the 2011 season. Of the eight riders to leave the team prior to the 2011 season, only Julien Paquet failed to find a team.

=== Roster details ===
For each of the riders listed below, their ages are listed as of January 1, 2011.

Rider	Date of birth
Steven Caethoven (BEL)	May 9, 1981 (aged 29)
Dieter Cappelle (BEL)	September 24, 1983 (aged 27)
Wim De Vocht (BEL)	April 29, 1982 (aged 28)
Sjef De Wilde (BEL)	May 3, 1981 (aged 29)
Thomas Degand (BEL)	May 13, 1986 (aged 24)
Jempy Drucker (LUX)	September 3, 1986 (aged 24)
Rob Goris (BEL)	March 15, 1982 (aged 28)
Grégory Habeaux (BEL)	October 20, 1982 (aged 28)
Dries Hollanders (Note: Rider joined the team on August 1 as a stagiaire.) (BEL)	July 31, 1986 (aged 24)
David Kemp (AUS)	April 10, 1984 (aged 26)
Staf Scheirlinckx (BEL)	March 12, 1979 (aged 31)

Rider	Date of birth
Bram Schmitz (NED)	April 23, 1977 (aged 33)
Sven Van Den Houte (BEL)	November 5, 1984 (aged 26)
Kevin Van Den Noortgate (BEL)	July 7, 1989 (aged 21)
Stefan van Dijk (NED)	January 22, 1976 (aged 34)
Jurgen Van Goolen (BEL)	November 28, 1980 (aged 30)
Arnoud Van Groen (NED)	December 11, 1983 (aged 27)
Kevin Van Melsen (BEL)	April 1, 1987 (aged 23)
James Vanlandschoot (BEL)	August 26, 1978 (aged 32)
Jaco Venter (RSA)	February 13, 1987 (aged 23)
Evert Verbist (BEL)	June 27, 1984 (aged 26)
Thomas Vernaeckt (BEL)	November 7, 1988 (aged 22)

Riders who joined the team for the 2011 season

Rider	2010 team
Steven Caethoven	Landbouwkrediet
Wim De Vocht	Team Milram
Jempy Drucker	Continental Team Differdange
Rob Goris	Palmans-Cras
David Kemp	Fly V Australia
Staf Scheirlinckx	Omega Pharma–Lotto
Bram Schmitz	Van Vliet–EBH Elshof
Jurgen Van Goolen	Omega Pharma–Lotto
Arnoud Van Groen	Vacansoleil
Jaco Venter	MTN–Energade
Evert Verbist	Van Goethem-Prorace
Thomas Vernaeckt	Sunweb-Revor

Riders who left the team during or after the 2010 season

Rider	2011 team
Andy Cappelle	Quick-Step
Cédric Collaers	Lotto-Bodysol
Julien Paquet	None
Fabio Polazzi	Wallonie Bruxelles–Crédit Agricole
Sven Renders	Team Worldofbike.gr
Robin Stenuit	Wallonie Bruxelles–Crédit Agricole
Hendrik Van Den Bossche	Donckers Koffie-Jelly Belly
Jonas Vangenechten	Wallonie Bruxelles–Crédit Agricole

== One-day races ==
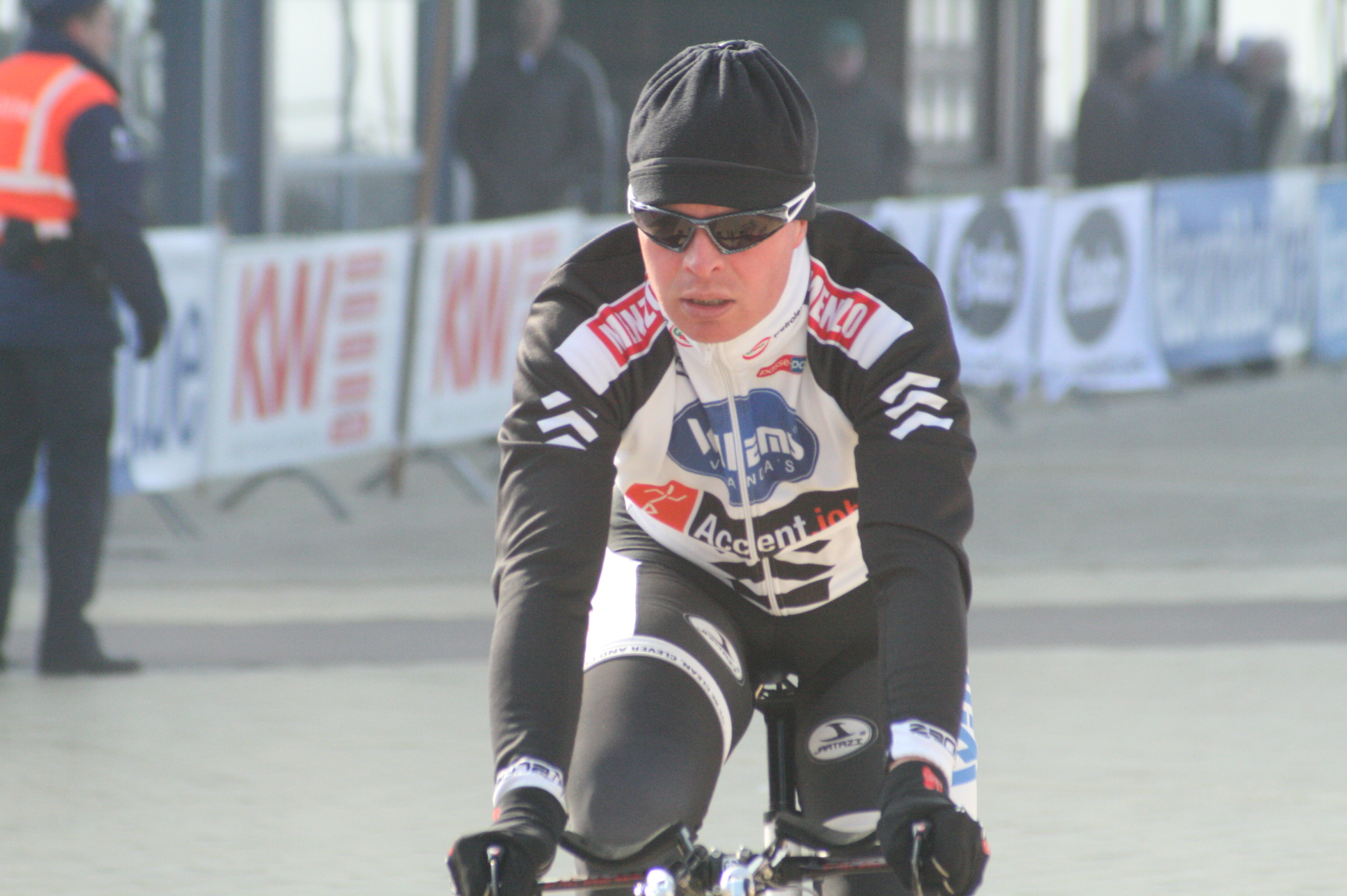
Despite not winning any single-day race during the season, Stefan van Dijk, pictured at the Driedaagse van West-Vlaanderen, finished within the top ten on twelve different occasions. Of the twelve, eight came in the second half of the year, helping him to finish sixth in the final UCI Europe Tour points standings.

=== Spring classics ===
The team had very little success in the single-day races in the early part of the year, and it was not until February before the team achieved a top ten placing in a race. At the Beverbeek Classic in Belgium, Verbist and Dries Hollanders – who would join Veranda's Willems Accent later in the year as a stagiaire – attacked off the front of the field and in the process, set up a two-man sprint for the victory in Hamont-Achel. Verbist gapped Hollanders by a second to win the race for the second time, after previously winning the race in 2006 with the Chocolade Jacques–Topsport Vlaanderen team. In March, van Dijk took two second-place finishes – both coming in mass sprints – at Omloop van het Waasland behind Landbouwkrediet's Aidis Kruopis, and the Nokere Koerse behind Gert Steegmans of Quick-Step.

Later in March, Van Groen finished ninth in the Classic Loire Atlantique, and Vanlandschoot took a sixth-place finish the next day in the Cholet-Pays de Loire race. In April, during one of the team's wildcard entries to a World Tour race, Scheirlinckx finished in eighth place in the Tour of Flanders, having bridged up to the lead group prior to the final climb of the race, the cobbled Bosberg hill, 10 km (6.2 mi) from the finish in Meerbeke. Van Dijk finished fourth in the Scheldeprijs three days later, having avoided a crash in the finishing straight which eliminated several riders from contention for the top placings. This result was again followed the next day by a top ten finish by Vanlandschoot, as in the Grand Prix Pino Cerami, Vanlandschoot finished in ninth place. May and June brought the team two more top ten finishes each month; Verbist finished tenth in the Circuit de Wallonie, and eighth in the Gullegem Koerse national event in Belgium, while in June, van Dijk finished fifth in the Tour de Rijke, and Van Groen finished tenth in another national event, the Ruddervoorde Koerse.

The team also sent squads to the Grand Prix d'Ouverture La Marseillaise, Omloop Het Nieuwsblad, Kuurne–Brussels–Kuurne, Le Samyn, De Vlaamse Pijl, the Handzame Classic, Dwars door Vlaanderen, E3 Prijs Vlaanderen – Harelbeke, Gent–Wevelgem, Hel van het Mergelland, Brabantse Pijl, the Grand Prix de Denain, the Tour du Finistère, the Amstel Gold Race, the Tro-Bro Léon, La Flèche Wallonne, Liège–Bastogne–Liège, the Eschborn-Frankfurt City Loop, Halle–Ingooigem, and the Internationale Wielertrofee Jong Maar Moedig, but placed outside of the top 10 in all of these races.

=== Fall races ===
The second half of the 2011 season for Veranda's Willems-Accent was more impressive than the first half of the year, taking top ten placings in 18 out of 22 single-day races held between July and October. It began with a victory, with Habeaux taking his first professional win in Dwars door het Hageland, held in Aarschot, Belgium. Verbist finished sixth in the Grand Prix José Dubois, before Habeaux took another top ten finish in Antwerpse Havenpijl in August. Later in August, van Dijk finished third in the Dutch Food Valley Classic, Verbist finished tenth in the Châteauroux Classic, Drucker finished sixth in the Grote Prijs Stad Zottegem, with Van Goolen adding a fourth top ten within the space of a week, with third in the Druivenkoers Overijse event.

Van Dijk then reeled off a run of five consecutive races in which he finished as the team's best rider. The run began towards the end of August with a tenth-place finish in the Schaal Sels-Merksem event, which was followed by a trio of fourth places in early-September at the Grote Prijs Jef Scherens, the Memorial Rik Van Steenbergen, and Paris–Brussels, before a third place the day after, in the Grand Prix de Fourmies. Later in the month, van Dijk finished eighth in the Kampioenschap van Vlaanderen, and second behind Quick-Step's Guillaume Van Keirsbulck in Omloop van het Houtland. October brought the team three final top ten placings; Verbist finished eighth in the Tour de Vendée, Vernaeckt took his best result of the season with ninth place in Binche–Tournai–Binche, and van Dijk concluded his season with fifth place in the final Belgian race of the season, the Nationale Sluitingsprijs.

The team also sent squads to the Polynormande, the Grand Prix de Wallonie, the Grand Prix d'Isbergues, Paris–Bourges, and Paris–Tours, but placed outside of the top 10 in all of these races.

== Stage races ==
Compared to the team's single-day form, Veranda's Willems-Accent were not so prominent during the stage races. Schmitz took a minor classification win at the Étoile de Bessèges, winning the mountains classification comfortably, scoring more than double the points of his closest rival Yuri Trofimov of Team Katusha. The team's first stage win did not come until June, when Caethoven won the final stage of the Delta Tour Zeeland into Terneuzen. Later in the month, the team took two more stage wins at the Route du Sud, with van Dijk winning the opening stage into Samatan, and Van Goolen won the third stage into Bagnères-de-Luchon, having soloed to victory from an earlier twelve-man breakaway, eventually winning the stage by 96 seconds. Van Dijk also took out the points classification for the team, which was the team's final classification win of the year. Later in the season, Degand took third place in the two-day Paris–Corrèze race.

The team also sent squads to the Tour du Haut Var, the Tour of South Africa, Driedaagse van West-Vlaanderen, the Three Days of De Panne, the Circuit de la Sarthe, the Presidential Tour of Turkey, the Four Days of Dunkirk, the Tour de Picardie, the Tour of Belgium, the Tour de Luxembourg, the Tour de Wallonie, the Eneco Tour, the Tour du Limousin, and the Tour de Wallonie-Picarde, but did not achieve a stage win, classification win, or podium finish in any of them.

== Grand Tours ==
As the squad was a UCI Professional Continental team for the first time in 2011, they were in a position to compete in one of the three Grand Tours. As such, all eighteen UCI ProTeams were invited automatically to each of the races, meaning that Veranda's Willems–Accent had to receive an invitation from each respective race organiser, in order to compete. However, the squad was not selected to ride any of the three Grand Tours; for the Giro d'Italia, four of the five wildcards were largely Italian teams, with the Geox–TMC team being the only exception. Four wildcards were on offer for the Tour de France, and all were received by French-based teams – Cofidis, Team Europcar, FDJ and Saur–Sojasun – and at the Vuelta a España, home teams Andalucía–Caja Granada and Geox–TMC were invited along with Cofidis and Dutch team Skil–Shimano.

== Season victories ==
At the end of the 2010–2011 UCI Europe Tour season, Veranda's Willems–Accent was ranked in fourteenth place in the final Europe Tour standings, with a total of 879 points contributed by the team's best eight riders in the concurrent individual rankings. Van Dijk was the team's best placed rider on the individual rankings, finishing in sixth place with 494 of the team's points; missing out on a top-five ranking by 24 points. Outside of the team's continental home tour, the squad was also ranked in the 2010–2011 UCI Africa Tour standings; with 14 points contributed by Degand, Venter and Habeaux at the Tour of South Africa, the team ranked in sixteenth place out of 22 points-scoring teams. The team also scored 40 points on the 2010–2011 UCI Asia Tour, but this was due to the acquisition of results as Veranda's Willems–Accent did not compete in Asia as a team during the season; David Kemp joined Veranda's Willems–Accent for the 2011 season, having won the Tour of Taihu in October 2010 for Fly V Australia.

Although the team was able to compete in UCI World Tour races during the season, no points were awarded to the team following a new rule introduced by the Union Cycliste Internationale, clarifying that only UCI ProTeams were eligible to score World Tour points.

Date	Race	Competition	Rider	Country	Location
February 6	Étoile de Bessèges, Mountains classification	UCI Europe Tour	Bram Schmitz (NED)	France	
February 26	Beverbeek Classic	UCI Europe Tour	Evert Verbist (BEL)	Belgium	Hamont-Achel
June 12	Delta Tour Zeeland, Stage 2	UCI Europe Tour	Steven Caethoven (BEL)	Netherlands	Terneuzen
June 16	Route du Sud, Stage 1	UCI Europe Tour	Stefan van Dijk (NED)	France	Samatan
June 18	Route du Sud, Stage 3	UCI Europe Tour	Jurgen Van Goolen (BEL)	France	Bagnères-de-Luchon
June 19	Route du Sud, Points classification	UCI Europe Tour	Stefan van Dijk (NED)	France	
July 3	Dwars door het Hageland	UCI Europe Tour	Gregory Habeaux (BEL)	Belgium	Aarschot

== Away from competition ==
=== Sponsorship ===
The team attracted a co-sponsor for the 2011 season, having been known as Verandas Willems during the 2010 season. When the list of 2011 UCI Professional Continental Teams was announced in December 2010, the team name was listed as Veranda's Willems–Accent. This was due to the involvement of Accent Jobs for people, a Belgian recruitment company, focusing on the job market in their native country as well as the pan-European market. They joined Veranda's Willems, a Belgian manufacturer of conservatories and windows, as main sponsors of the team. Other team partners included carbonated soft drinks company Coca-Cola, bicycle components company Miche, sports equipment manufacturer Oakley, electronic sports equipment manufacturer Sigma Sport, and many more.

Following the 2011 season, it was announced that Accent Jobs for People would become "the full owner/sponsor of their Pro Continental cycling team", and in effect, change the order in which the names appeared in the team's documentation; becoming Accent.jobs–Willems Veranda's for 2012. The team had hoped to acquire another main sponsor in order to provide budget for any further signings that the team may have wished to have carried out, but this did not materialise; leaving the team shy of the 20 riders they wished to have. As well as a change in the background running of the team, with Wim Vanhaelemeesch replacing Bill Olivier as team manager, the team also introduced a new-look kit for the 2012 season. Replacing the white-and-black kit that the team had adopted since its formation, a predominately orange kit with areas of black around the shoulders was introduced ahead of their 2012 season-opening race.

=== Postseason ===
Six riders left the team at the conclusion of the 2011 season. Failing to take a top ten finish at any race in the season, Dieter Cappelle was not retained after two seasons with the team. Sven Van Den Houte, who had been with the team since 2009, left the squad to join the Colba-Superano Ham team, after failing to register a top-50 finish in any race he contested in 2011. The other four riders left the squad after only twelve months with the outfit; Jaco Venter left to join Differdange–Magic–SportFood.de, while Thomas Vernaeckt left to join the new Belgian-Algerian squad formed for the start of the 2012 season, Geofco Ville d'Alger. David Kemp failed to garner a contract for the 2012 season, while Bram Schmitz retired from competitive racing at the age of 34; he competed as a professional between 1999 and 2011, for the TVM–Farm Frites, Batavus-Bankgiroloterij, T-Mobile Team and Van Vliet–EBH Advocaten teams, as well as his season with Veranda's Willems–Accent.

Four riders joined the team ahead of the 2012 season. Following his season at Quick-Step, Andy Cappelle rejoined the team after a winless season at Quick-Step, although he did finish runner-up to Team Europcar's Anthony Charteau in January's La Tropicale Amissa Bongo. After two seasons with the Caja Rural team, Oleg Chuzhda joined the squad, while Kevyn Ista left Cofidis after two seasons, with a best result of second place at the 2011 Le Samyn. The final arrival at the team for 2012 was ex-Team Katusha rider and three-time Belgian national time trial champion Leif Hoste. Hoste was signed to boost the team's abilities in the Classic races, having been a three-time runner-up in the Tour of Flanders Monument race. This left the team's roster at 18 riders for the 2012 season.
