= Egmond-pier-Egmond =

Race details
- Date: January
- Region: Egmond aan Zee, Netherlands
- Discipline: Mountain biking
- Type: Beach race
- Web site: www.gpgrootegmondpieregmond.nl

History
- First edition: 1998
- Editions: 21 (as of 2020)
- First winner: ♂ Jan Weevers (NED) ♀ Ingrid van Lubek (NED)
- Most wins: ♂ Jan Weevers (NED) (3 wins) ♂ Sebastian Langeveld (NED) ♀ Gabrielle Rovers (NED) (2 wins) ♀ Marianne Vos (NED) ♀ Pauliena Rooijakkers (NED)
- Most recent: ♂ Sebastian Langeveld (NED) ♀ Tessa Neefjes (NED)

Egmond-pier-Egmond is a men's and women's beach mountainbiking event held annually in Egmond aan Zee, Netherlands. The first edition was in 1998.

== Honours ==
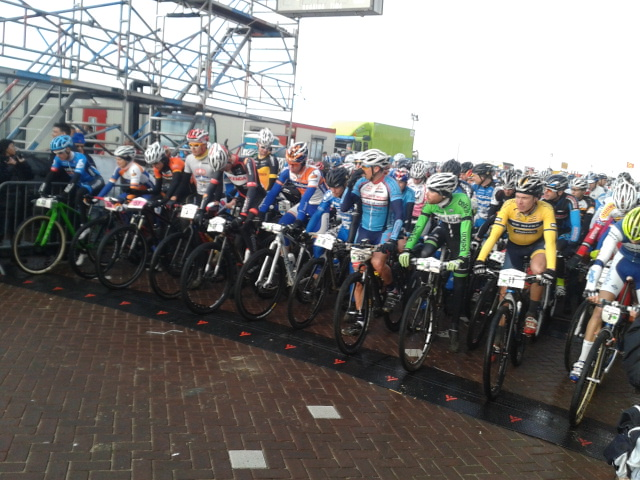
Start 2014 Egmond-pier-Egmond with on the first row Ellen van Dijk and Laurens ten Dam.

=== Men's ===
Year	Winner	Second	Third
2020	Sebastian Langeveld (NED)	Johnny Hoogerland (NED)	Stijn Appel (NED)
2019	Timothy Dupont (BEL)	Lars Boom (NED)	Ivar Slik (NED)
2018	Jasper Ockeloen (NED)	Rick van Breda (NED)	Ramon Sinkeldam (NED)
2017	Jordy Buskermolen (NED)	Timothy Dupont (BEL)	Joris Blokker (NED)
2016	Timothy Dupont (BEL)	Bram Imming (NED)	Jasper Ockeloen (NED)
2015	Richard Jansen (NED)	Bram Imming (NED)	Sebastian Langeveld (NED)
2014	Sebastian Langeveld (NED)	Bram Rood (NED)	Kevin Van Hoovels (BEL)
2013	Rob van der Niet (NED)	Kevin Van Hoovels (BEL)	Roy Rotteveel (NED)
2012	Rob van der Niet (NED)	Sander Lormans (NED)	Kevin Van Hoovels (BEL)
2011	Ramses Bekkenk (NED)	Nicolas Vermeulen (BEL)	Kevin Van Hoovels (BEL)
2010	cancelled		
2009	Sebastian Langeveld (NED)	Nico Berckmans (BEL)	Sander Lormans (NED)
2008	Sander Lormans (NED)	Bram Rood (NED)	Ramses Bekkenk (NED)
2007	Andy Cappelle (NED)	Bart Brentjens (NED)	Mathijs Wagenaar (NED)
2006	Erik Dekker (NED)	Thomas Dekker (NED)	Sander Lormans (NED)
2005	cancelled		
2004	Thijs Al (NED)	Bart Brentjens (NED)	Jan Weevers (NED)
2003	Andy Cappelle (BEL)	Bart Brentjens (NED)	Thijs Al (NED)
2002	Jan Weevers (NED)	Bart Brentjens (NED)	Sander Lormans (NED)
2001			
2000			
1999	Gert-Jan Theunisse (NED)	Ed Scholte (NED)	Bart Brentjens (NED)
1998	Jan Weevers (NED)	Patrick Tolhoek (NED)	Steven De Jongh (NED)

=== Women's ===
Year	Winner	Second	Third
2020	Tessa Neefjes (NED)	Maud Rijnbeek (NED)	Grace Verbeke (BEL)
2019	Rozanne Slik (NED)	Nina Kessler (NED)	Grace Verbeke (BEL)
2018	Nina Kessler (NED)	Rozanne Slik (NED)	Ellen van Dijk (NED)
2017	Pauliena Rooijakkers (NED)	Nina Kessler (NED)	Roxane Knetemann (NED)
2016	Roxane Knetemann (NED)	Nina Kessler (NED)	Rozanne Slik (NED)
2015	Pauliena Rooijakkers (NED)	Roxane Knetemann (NED)	Iris Slappendel (NED)
2014	Marianne Vos (NED)	Roxane Knetemann (NED)	Alieke Hoogenboom (NED)
2013	Marianne Vos (NED)	Iris Slappendel (NED)	Alieke Hoogenboom (NED)
2012	Lucinda Brand (NED)	Inne Gantois (BEL)	Monique Arkenbout-Andries (NED)
2011	Alieke Hoogenboom (NED)	Arielle Boek-van Meurs (NED)	Kim Saenen (NED)
2010	Cancelled		
2009	Gabrielle Rovers (NED)	Ingrid van Lubek (NED)	Adrie Visser (NED)
2008	Gabrielle Rovers (NED)	Merel Koenen (NED)	Joyce Vanderbeken (BEL)
2007	Ariëlle van Meurs (NED)	Riikka Kelja (NED)	Ingrid van Lubek (NED)
2006	Adrie Visser (NED)	Ingrid van Lubek (NED)	Riikka Kelja (NED)
2005	Cancelled		
2004	Suzanne de Goede (NED)	Merel Koenen (NED)	Ariëlle van Meurs (NED)
2003	Suzanne De Goede (NED)	Leontien van Moorsel (NED)	Lenie Dijkstra (NED)
2002	Leontien van Moorsel (NED)		
2001	Leontien van Moorsel (NED)		
2000	Lenie Dijkstra (NED)		
1999	Jacqueline Van Vliet (NED)	Bianca Van Dijk (NED)	Ingrid van Lubek (NED)
1998	Katinka Wiltenburg (NED)		
