= 2010 Tour Down Under =

12th edition of the Tour Down Under cycling stage race

2010 UCI World Ranking, race 1 of 26

Race details
- Dates: 19–24 January 2010
- Stages: 6
- Distance: 794 km (493 mi)
- Winning time: 18 h 47 min 05 s

Results
Jersey awarded to the overall winner	Winner	André Greipel (GER)	(Team HTC–Columbia)
	Second	Luis León Sánchez (ESP)	(Caisse d'Epargne)
	Third	Greg Henderson (NZL)	(Team Sky)
Jersey awarded to the mountains classification winner	Mountains	Thomas Rohregger (AUT)	(Team Milram)
Jersey awarded to the young rider classification winner	Young rider	Jürgen Roelandts (BEL)	(Omega Pharma–Lotto)
Jersey awarded to the sprints classification winner	Sprints	André Greipel (GER)	(Team HTC–Columbia)
Jersey awarded to the team classification winner	Team	Ag2r–La Mondiale	

The 2010 Tour Down Under was the 12th edition of the Tour Down Under cycling stage race. It was held from 19 to 24 January 2010 in and around Adelaide, South Australia. It was the first event in the 2010 UCI World Calendar. The race was won by André Greipel of Team HTC–Columbia after he won the sprint finishes to three of the race's stages.

== Overall favourites ==
As the Tour Down Under has historically been a race which favours sprinters winning the overall classification, several sprinters were tabbed as favourites for victory in the 2010 Tour. These included defending champion Allan Davis, now with Astana, Gert Steegmans of Team RadioShack, Baden Cooke of Team Saxo Bank, Greg Henderson from Team Sky, and 2008 champion André Greipel from Team HTC–Columbia. Greipel specifically shied away from talk of him being a favourite for victory. Additionally, Caisse d'Epargne was noted to be bringing a strong squad, including reigning Vuelta a España champion Alejandro Valverde. Valverde's presence was speculated to increase the chances for 2005 Tour Down Under champion Luis León Sánchez, who is riding a program in 2010 meant to lead to victory in Paris–Nice. Along with Sánchez, Cooke's teammate Stuart O'Grady, Martin Elmiger from Ag2r–La Mondiale, Wesley Sulzberger of Française des Jeux, and Garmin–Transitions rider Robbie Hunter were also named as contenders. The race also featured reigning World Road Race Champion Cadel Evans and seven-time Tour de France champion Lance Armstrong; they were not, however, considered to be contenders in the race as they would focus on later events in the 2010 season.

== Participating teams ==
As the Tour Down Under is a UCI ProTour event, all ProTour teams were invited automatically and obligated to send a squad. Thus, the event was the debut for the new ProTour entries Team RadioShack and Team Sky. Additionally, the Australian national team known as UniSA–Australia competed in the event. BMC Racing Team also attended, as the first UCI Professional Continental team ever to be granted a wild card. This was likely to allow new world champion Cadel Evans to ride with the rainbow jersey in his home nation.

The teams participating in the race were:

- Ag2r–La Mondiale
- Astana
- BMC Racing Team
- Caisse d'Epargne
- Euskaltel–Euskadi
- Française des Jeux
- Garmin–Transitions
- Liquigas–Doimo
- Quick-Step
- Omega Pharma–Lotto
- Rabobank
- Team HTC–Columbia
- Team Katusha
- Team Milram
- Team RadioShack
- Team Saxo Bank
- Team Sky
- UniSA–Australia

== Tour stages ==
=== Stage 1 ===
19 January 2010 – Clare to Tanunda, 141 km (88 mi)

The first stage had a sloping profile, with a point-awarding climb coming up Menglers Hill Road at the 114 km (71 mi) mark. The final 25 km (16 mi) were totally flat.

The first UCI ProTour race of the season began with a crash. About 300 m (980 ft) after the true beginning of the stage, a Euskaltel–Euskadi rider crashed in the middle of the peloton and brought half the group down with him. Among the riders caught up was Cadel Evans, riding with the rainbow jersey in his home nation for the first time. The world champion had to have his shoes attached to his bicycle with electrical tape to continue the stage.

Timothy Roe, Martin Kohler, and Blel Kadri formed the day's significant breakaway, coming clear of the peloton after 20 km (12 mi). They were away through the day's intermediate sprint, and Roe was able to claim the Mengler Hill climb, putting three of the four major jerseys on these riders' shoulders at day's end. In the last 20 km (12 mi), a driving Team HTC–Columbia, led by time trial specialist Bert Grabsch, absorbed all of them back into the peloton. Roe had also crashed while descending Mengler Hill. The group sprint finish was won by HTC-Columbia rider André Greipel.

Defending champion Allan Davis all but lost any chance to repeat as Tour champion. His team Astana had come to the race without radios, and therefore his teammates did not know that he was not with the main group during the Mengler Hill climb. Unaware, the Astana team pulled the peloton away from Davis, who finished in the second large group, 8'22" back.

Stage 1 Result

	Cyclist	Team	Time
1	André Greipel (GER)	Team HTC–Columbia	3h 15' 30"
2	Gert Steegmans (BEL)	Team RadioShack	s.t.
3	Jürgen Roelandts (BEL)	Omega Pharma–Lotto	s.t.
4	Danilo Wyss (SUI)	BMC Racing Team	s.t.
5	Greg Henderson (NZL)	Team Sky	s.t.
6	Baden Cooke (AUS)	Team Saxo Bank	s.t.
7	Graeme Brown (AUS)	Rabobank	s.t.
8	Robbie McEwen (AUS)	Team Katusha	s.t.
9	José Joaquín Rojas (ESP)	Caisse d'Epargne	s.t.
10	Valeriy Dmitriyev (KAZ)	Astana	s.t.

General Classification after Stage 1

	Cyclist	Team	Time
1	André Greipel (GER)	Team HTC–Columbia	3h 15' 20"
2	Gert Steegmans (BEL)	Team RadioShack	+ 4"
3	Martin Kohler (SUI)	BMC Racing Team	+ 4"
4	Jürgen Roelandts (BEL)	Omega Pharma–Lotto	+ 6"
5	Blel Kadri (FRA)	Ag2r–La Mondiale	+ 6"
6	Timothy Roe (AUS)	UniSA–Australia	+ 8"
7	Danilo Wyss (SUI)	BMC Racing Team	+ 10"
8	Greg Henderson (NZL)	Team Sky	+ 10"
9	Baden Cooke (AUS)	Team Saxo Bank	+ 10"
10	Graeme Brown (AUS)	Rabobank	+ 10"

=== Stage 2 ===
20 January 2010 – Gawler to Hahndorf, 133 km (83 mi)

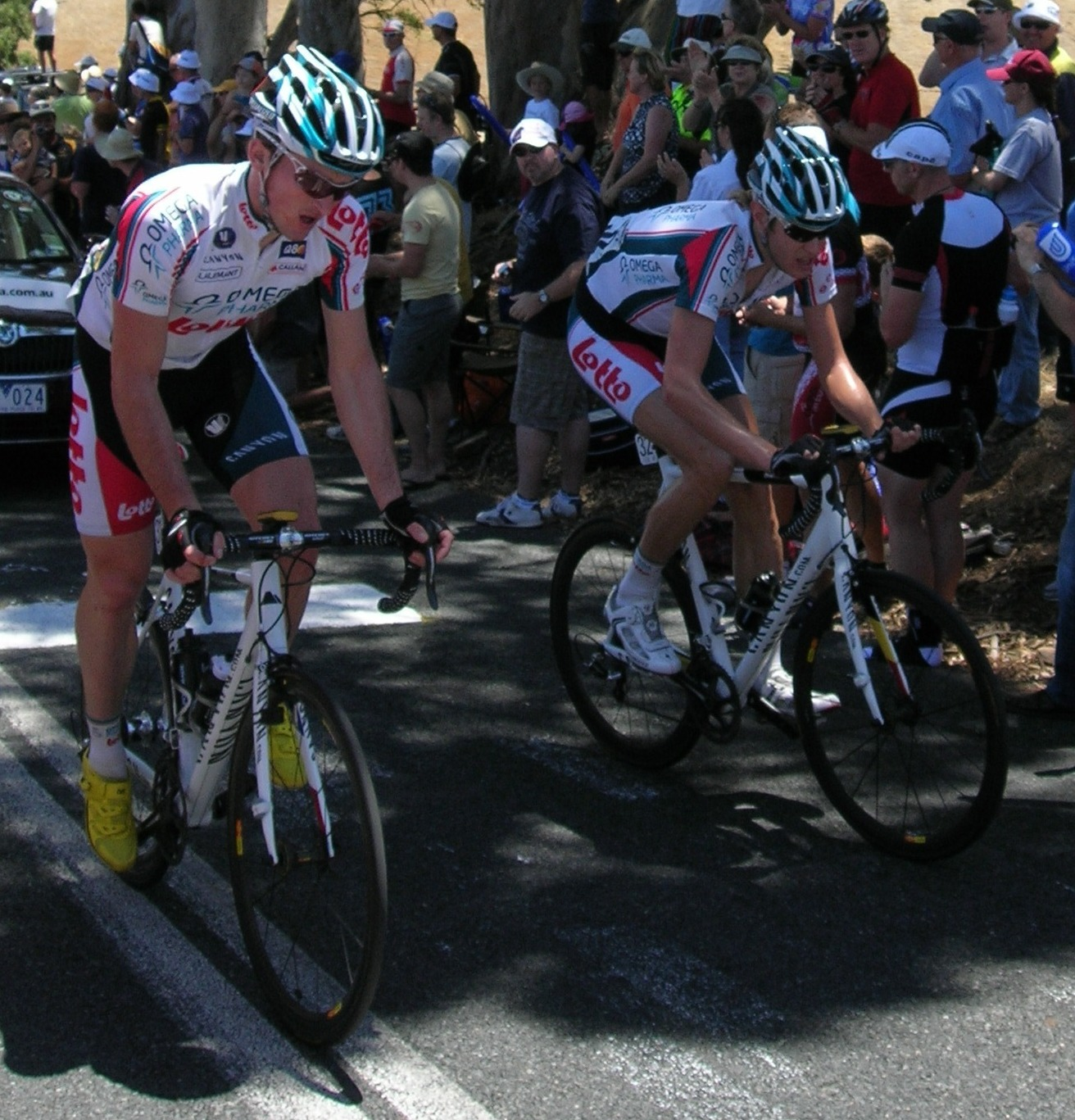
Mickaël Delage and Olivier Kaisen of Omega Pharma–Lotto.

After climbing a few hundred meters in the first 30 km (19 mi), this stage was mostly flat. There was, as with all stages, a categorized climb, up Checker Hill Road 90 km (56 mi) in.

This stage was mostly similar to the first one. Omega Pharma–Lotto teammates Mickaël Delage and Olivier Kaisen formed the day's breakaway with UniSA–Australia rider David Kemp. Euskaltel-Euskadi, Team Milram, and Team Saxo Bank tried to send riders to follow, but the peloton did not allow them to get away. Kemp allowed the Omega Pharma-Lotto riders to take the two intermediate sprints so that he would be allowed maximum points on the Checker Hill climb, allowing his teammate Timothy Roe to keep the white jersey. Kemp then tried to solo for the stage win, but Team Sky and Team HTC-Columbia chased him down, with race leader Greipel again coming away with a stage win. Minor controversy followed, as both Greg Henderson and Danilo Wyss accused other riders (namely Robbie McEwen and Graeme Brown) of poaching their leadouts and therefore causing them to lose finishing positions.

Stage 2 Result

	Cyclist	Team	Time
1	André Greipel (GER)	Team HTC–Columbia	3h 23' 49"
2	Greg Henderson (NZL)	Team Sky	s.t.
3	Robbie McEwen (AUS)	Team Katusha	s.t.
4	Robbie Hunter (RSA)	Garmin–Transitions	s.t.
5	Graeme Brown (AUS)	Rabobank	s.t.
6	Allan Davis (AUS)	Astana	s.t.
7	Danilo Wyss (SUI)	BMC Racing Team	s.t.
8	Luke Roberts (AUS)	Team Milram	s.t.
9	Baden Cooke (AUS)	Team Saxo Bank	s.t.
10	José Joaquín Rojas (ESP)	Caisse d'Epargne	s.t.

General Classification after Stage 2

	Cyclist	Team	Time
1	André Greipel (GER)	Team HTC–Columbia	6h 38' 59"
2	Greg Henderson (NZL)	Team Sky	+ 14"
3	Gert Steegmans (BEL)	Team RadioShack	+ 14"
4	Robbie McEwen (AUS)	Team Katusha	+ 16"
5	Jürgen Roelandts (BEL)	Omega Pharma–Lotto	+ 16"
6	Danilo Wyss (SUI)	BMC Racing Team	+ 20"
7	Graeme Brown (AUS)	Rabobank	+ 20"
8	Baden Cooke (AUS)	Team Saxo Bank	+ 20"
9	Robbie Hunter (RSA)	Garmin–Transitions	+ 20"
10	José Joaquín Rojas (ESP)	Caisse d'Epargne	+ 20"

=== Stage 3 ===
21 January 2010 – Unley to Stirling, 132.5 km (82.3 mi)

This stage contained the Tour's most difficult climb to this point, Wickhams Hill Road, which came just before the 40 km (25 mi) mark. Afterward, the course remained at approximately the elevation reached after the climb, and undulated.

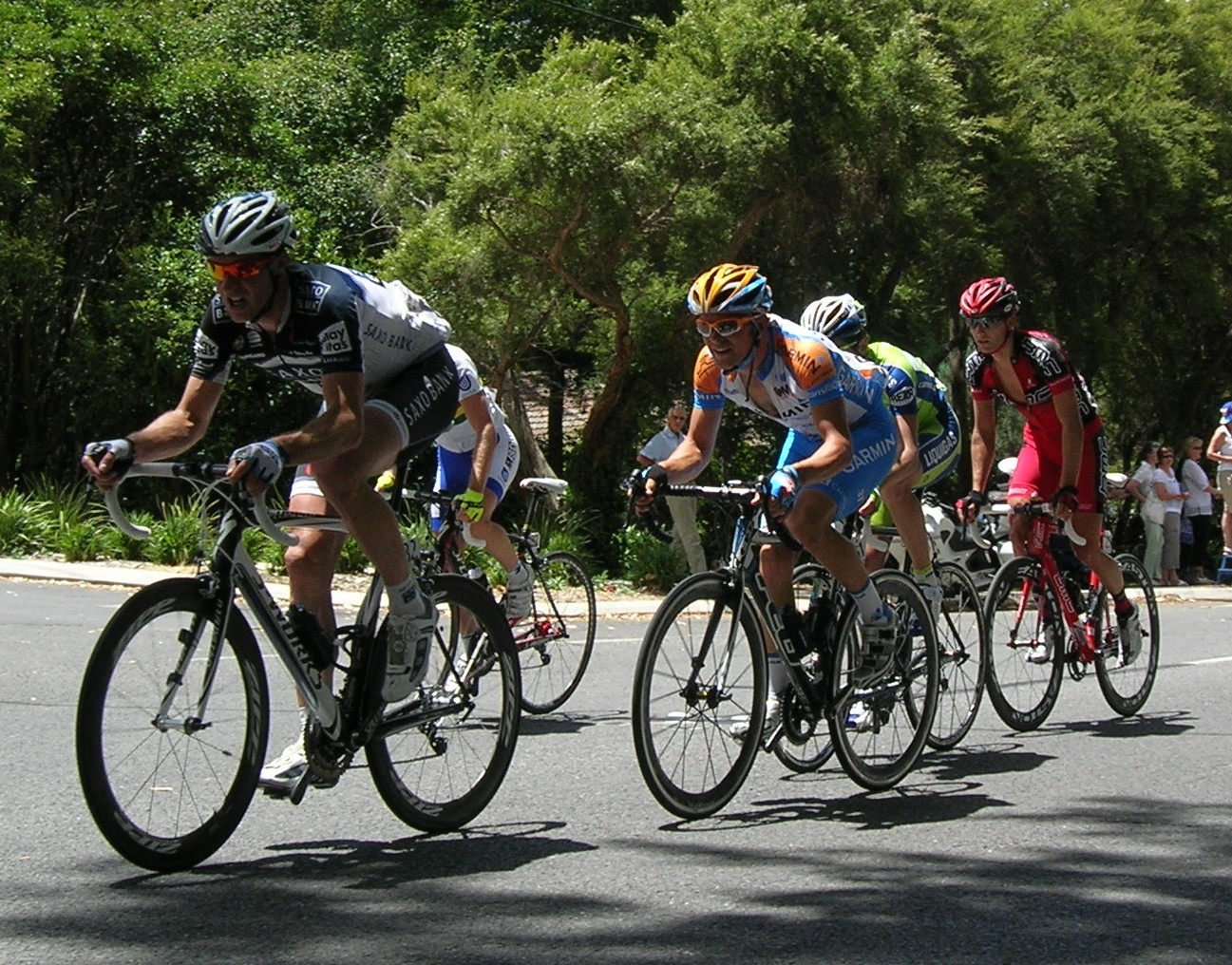
The stage's principal breakaway – Jens Voigt, Simon Clarke, Jack Bobridge, Maciej Paterski, and Karsten Kroon, from left to right.

The temperature topped out at over 40 °C (104 °F) on this day, which combined with the hilly terrain made the stage very difficult for some riders. A 40-rider group contested the final sprint finish, while half the peloton lost more than a minute and 13 riders lost more than ten minutes. The day's breakaway involved Simon Clarke of UniSA–Australia and Karsten Kroon from BMC Racing Team, who were joined at the 70 km (43 mi) mark by Maciej Paterski, Jens Voigt, and Jack Bobridge. Caisse d'Epargne was the team who worked the hardest to chase them down, thinning the leading group to try to protect Alejandro Valverde, José Joaquín Rojas, or Luis León Sánchez for a stage-winning attack. Portuguese national champion Manuel Cardoso from Footon–Servetto–Fuji broke out of the leading group within the final kilometer and took the stage win away from Valverde or Cadel Evans, who had seemed poised to contest a sprint with Valverde. After the stage, Valverde described holding Evans' wheel, and that a moment of hesitation when he was unsure if Evans was attacking for victory had cost him his chance of catching Cardoso. Cardoso's win was his first as a ProTour rider.

Stage 3 Result

	Cyclist	Team	Time
1	Manuel Cardoso (POR)	Footon–Servetto–Fuji	3h 14' 38"
2	Alejandro Valverde (ESP)	Caisse d'Epargne	+ 1"
3	Cadel Evans (AUS)	BMC Racing Team	s.t.
4	Peter Sagan (SVK)	Liquigas–Doimo	s.t.
5	Mauro Finetto (ITA)	Liquigas–Doimo	s.t.
6	Michael Rogers (AUS)	Team HTC–Columbia	s.t.
7	Luke Roberts (AUS)	Team Milram	s.t.
8	Markus Fothen (GER)	Team Milram	s.t.
9	Anthony Roux (FRA)	Française des Jeux	s.t.
10	Eduard Vorganov (RUS)	Team Katusha	s.t.

General Classification after Stage 3

	Cyclist	Team	Time
1	André Greipel (GER)	Team HTC–Columbia	9h 53' 38"
2	Greg Henderson (NZL)	Team Sky	+ 14"
3	Gert Steegmans (BEL)	Team RadioShack	+ 14"
4	Alejandro Valverde (ESP)	Caisse d'Epargne	+ 14"
5	Robbie McEwen (AUS)	Team Katusha	+ 16"
6	Jürgen Roelandts (BEL)	Omega Pharma–Lotto	+ 16"
7	Cadel Evans (AUS)	BMC Racing Team	+ 16"
8	Andriy Hryvko (UKR)	Astana	+ 19"
9	Graeme Brown (AUS)	Rabobank	+ 20"
10	Robbie Hunter (RSA)	Garmin–Transitions	+ 20"

=== Stage 4 ===
22 January 2010 – Norwood to Goolwa, 149.5 km (92.9 mi)

This stage began with climbing and ended at lower elevation. The climb up Fox Creek Road, visited after 25 km (16 mi), reached over 500 m (1,600 ft) in elevation. After a long descent from that height 35 km (22 mi) later, the last 70 km (43 mi) were completely flat.

Seven riders formed a breakaway group shortly after the true beginning of the stage. Among them were the top two men in the mountains classification, David Kemp and Thomas Rohregger, with Rohregger out-climbing Kemp to claim the white jersey at day's end. The group held a maximum advantage of 3'15", but the flat terrain and the strong crosswinds the group faced meant they stood no chance of staying away. Graeme Brown and Robbie McEwen started their sprints earlier than race leader André Greipel, but for the third time the big German was delivered safely first to the line by his leadout train. Greipel specifically mentioned new acquisition Matthew Goss as having been a key asset to him in the sprint.

Stage 4 Result

	Cyclist	Team	Time
1	André Greipel (GER)	Team HTC–Columbia	3h 30' 29"
2	Robbie McEwen (AUS)	Team Katusha	s.t.
3	Graeme Brown (AUS)	Rabobank	s.t.
4	Gert Steegmans (BEL)	Team RadioShack	s.t.
5	Manuel Cardoso (POR)	Footon–Servetto–Fuji	s.t.
6	Julian Dean (NZL)	Garmin–Transitions	s.t.
7	Jürgen Roelandts (BEL)	Omega Pharma–Lotto	s.t.
8	Matthew Goss (AUS)	Team HTC–Columbia	s.t.
9	Robert Förster (GER)	Team Milram	s.t.
10	Yauheni Hutarovich (BLR)	Française des Jeux	s.t.

General Classification after Stage 4

	Cyclist	Team	Time
1	André Greipel (GER)	Team HTC–Columbia	13h 23' 57"
2	Robbie McEwen (AUS)	Team Katusha	+ 20"
3	Greg Henderson (NZL)	Team Sky	+ 24"
4	Gert Steegmans (BEL)	Team RadioShack	+ 24"
5	Graeme Brown (AUS)	Rabobank	+ 26"
6	Jürgen Roelandts (BEL)	Omega Pharma–Lotto	+ 26"
7	Cadel Evans (AUS)	BMC Racing Team	+ 26"
8	Andriy Hryvko (UKR)	Astana	+ 29"
9	Robbie Hunter (RSA)	Garmin–Transitions	+ 30"
10	Baden Cooke (AUS)	Team Saxo Bank	+ 30"

=== Stage 5 ===
23 January 2010 – Snapper Point to Willunga, 148 km (92 mi)

This was the Tour's most difficult stage, concluding with a two-lap circuit in Willunga that included two visits to the Old Willunga Hill Road, the hardest climb in the race due to its steepness. Adelaide's Sunday Mail newspaper stated that this was "the most exciting day in Tour [Down Under] history".

The stage was won by Caisse d'Epargne's Luis León Sánchez. After this grueling stage, André Greipel, with the help of his team, managed to keep both the ochre jersey and the blue jersey. The young Belgian rider Jürgen Roelandts from Omega Pharma–Lotto still holds the black jersey. In the mountains classification, Thomas Rohregger of Team Milram held an insurmountable lead with 56 points. Ag2r–La Mondiale is the leading team, 2 seconds ahead of Caisse d'Epargne.

The principal breakaway of the day occurred on the second ascent of the Old Willunga Hill Road. It included two riders from Caisse d'Epargne in Alejandro Valverde and Luis León Sánchez, who had come to the race eager to earn victories. The other two riders were Peter Sagan from Liquigas–Doimo, who had figured into breakaways in previous stages and in the Cancer Council Helpline Classic earlier in the week, and Cadel Evans. With 4 km (2.5 mi) left to race, the four had a lead of 31 seconds, which potentially put Evans in position to take the race lead away from André Greipel. During the final few minutes of the stage, Greipel's teammates Hayden Roulston, Michael Rogers, and Matthew Goss pulled the peloton hard, so that they finished just 9 seconds behind stage winner Sánchez. While Team HTC–Columbia pulled, the strain of the breakaway and the final meters of the climb took its toll on the other three members of the leading group, who fell off as Sánchez soloed to the finish line. Greipel's lead was reduced to 11 seconds, but with only a very short flat stage remaining, it was likely to be secure.

Stage 5 Result

	Cyclist	Team	Time
1	Luis León Sánchez (ESP)	Caisse d'Epargne	3h 29' 39"
2	Luke Roberts (AUS)	Team Milram	+ 2"
3	Alejandro Valverde (ESP)	Caisse d'Epargne	+ 4"
4	Cadel Evans (AUS)	BMC Racing Team	s.t.
5	Peter Sagan (SVK)	Liquigas–Doimo	+ 6"
6	Markus Fothen (GER)	Team Milram	s.t.
7	Sébastien Rosseler (BEL)	Team RadioShack	s.t.
8	Cameron Meyer (AUS)	Garmin–Transitions	s.t.
9	Greg Henderson (NZL)	Team Sky	+ 9"
10	Fabio Sabatini (ITA)	Liquigas–Doimo	s.t.

General Classification after Stage 5

	Cyclist	Team	Time
1	André Greipel (GER)	Team HTC–Columbia	16h 53' 45"
2	Luis León Sánchez (ESP)	Caisse d'Epargne	+ 11"
3	Luke Roberts (AUS)	Team Milram	+ 17"
4	Robbie McEwen (AUS)	Team Katusha	+ 20"
5	Cadel Evans (AUS)	BMC Racing Team	+ 21"
6	Greg Henderson (NZL)	Team Sky	+ 24"
7	Eduard Vorganov (RUS)	Team Katusha	+ 25"
8	Jürgen Roelandts (BEL)	Omega Pharma–Lotto	+ 26"
9	Markus Fothen (GER)	Team Milram	+ 27"
10	Andriy Hryvko (UKR)	Astana	+ 29"

=== Stage 6 ===
24 January 2010 – Adelaide, 90 km (56 mi)

The Tour concluded with a criterium around the Adelaide City Council. The race was held on a closed road circuit 4.5 km (2.8 mi) in length.

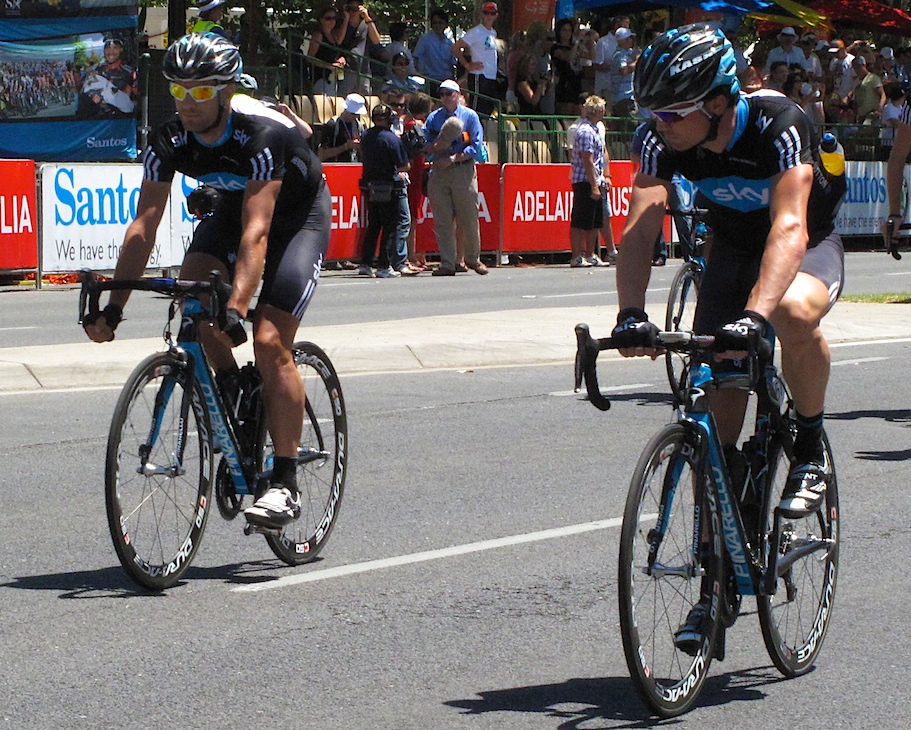
The Team Sky duo of Christopher Sutton and Greg Henderson, top two finishers in the Adelaide criterium.

Robbie McEwen and Greg Henderson formed a breakaway early in the criterium which gave them, respectively, the two intermediate sprints the stage offered. The bonus seconds that came with them propelled them both past Luke Roberts, who began the day in third place overall. Henderson was two seconds better than McEwen, and thus made it to the podium.

Later, Wesley Sulzberger, Trent Lowe, and Fabio Sabatini broke away to try for the stage win, riding the last five laps of the criterium ahead of the peloton, but Team Sky brought them back before the finish. As they had in the Cancer Council Helpline Classic earlier in the week, the new British team took the top two finishing positions in this stage, with Christopher Sutton ahead of Henderson this time. Though it was his worst performance in a sprint finish in this Tour, in fifth place, André Greipel still emerged as Tour champion.

Stage 6 Result

	Cyclist	Team	Time
1	Christopher Sutton (AUS)	Team Sky	1h 53' 20"
2	Greg Henderson (NZL)	Team Sky	s.t.
3	Graeme Brown (AUS)	Rabobank	s.t.
4	Robbie McEwen (AUS)	Team Katusha	s.t.
5	André Greipel (GER)	Team HTC–Columbia	s.t.
6	Allan Davis (AUS)	Astana	s.t.
7	Matthew Goss (AUS)	Team HTC–Columbia	s.t.
8	Yauheni Hutarovich (BLR)	Française des Jeux	s.t.
9	Gert Steegmans (BEL)	Team RadioShack	s.t.
10	Anthony Ravard (FRA)	Ag2r–La Mondiale	s.t.

Final General Classification

	Cyclist	Team	Time
1	André Greipel (GER)	Team HTC–Columbia	18h 47' 05"
2	Luis León Sánchez (ESP)	Caisse d'Epargne	+ 11"
3	Greg Henderson (NZL)	Team Sky	+ 15"
4	Robbie McEwen (AUS)	Team Katusha	+ 17"
5	Luke Roberts (AUS)	Team Milram	+ 17"
6	Cadel Evans (AUS)	BMC Racing Team	+ 21"
7	Eduard Vorganov (RUS)	Team Katusha	+ 25"
8	Jürgen Roelandts (BEL)	Omega Pharma–Lotto	+ 26"
9	Robbie Hunter (RSA)	Garmin–Transitions	+ 26"
10	Markus Fothen (GER)	Team Milram	+ 27"

== Classification leadership ==
In the 2010 Tour Down Under, six different jerseys were awarded. For the general classification, calculated by adding each cyclist's finishing times on each stage, and allowing time bonuses for the first three finishers on each stage and in intermediate sprints, the leader received an ochre jersey. This classification is considered the most important of the Tour Down Under, and the winner is considered the winner of the Tour.

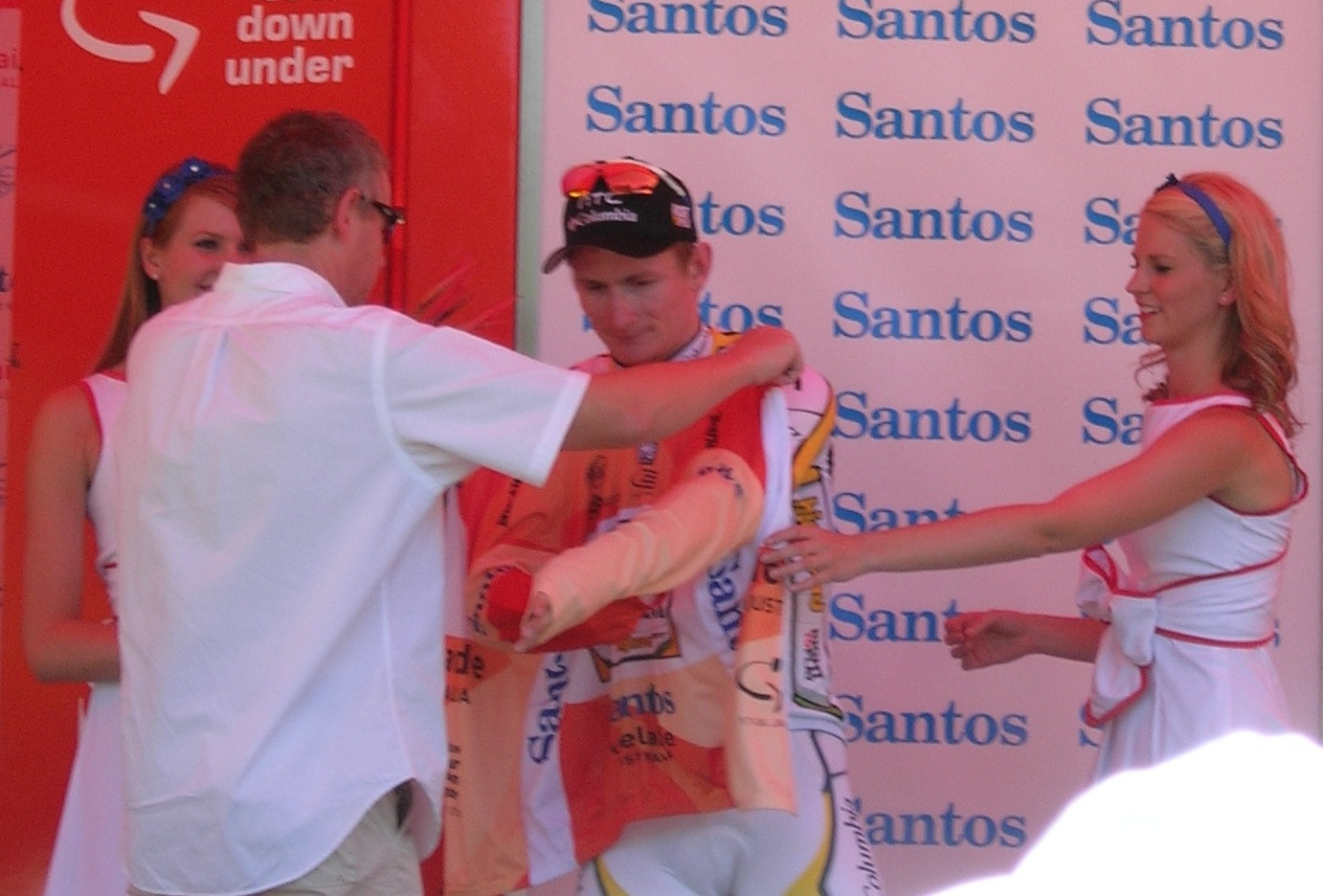
Tour Down Under champion André Greipel receiving the ochre jersey.

Additionally, there was a sprint classification, which awarded a blue jersey. In the sprint classification, cyclists got points for finishing in the top three in a stage or intermediate sprint, with the top three finishers in the stage getting 8, 6, and 4 points respectively, and the top three in the intermediate sprints getting 6, 4, and 2.

There was also a mountains classification, which awards a white jersey. In the mountains classifications, points were won by reaching the top of a mountain before other cyclists. Unlike most other cycling events, there was no categorization of climbs – each awarded the same points (16, 12, 8, 6, and 4) to the first five riders past the summit.

The fourth jersey represented the young rider classification. This classification awards a black jersey.

Due to UCI rules limiting the number of jersey awards to four, the above were the only jerseys awarded to riders which were then worn the next day during the stage. But there were two other jerseys. The first was the red jersey for the most aggressive rider. This award is comparable to the combativity award of the Tour de France. While the rider received a red jersey on the podium after the stage, he wore his normal jersey (unless holding one of the above four) in the next stage, with the aggressive rider award indicated by a red bib number.

The sixth and final jersey was for the teams classification. This jersey was not presented on the podiums daily, but it was awarded to the winning team at the end of the Tour. The teams classification is calculated by adding the times of each team's best four riders per stage per day. The jersey is blue.

Stage	Winner	General Classification	Mountains Classification	Sprint Classification	Young Rider Classification	Team Classification	Aggressive Rider
1	André Greipel	André Greipel	Timothy Roe	Martin Kohler	Martin Kohler	Ag2r–La Mondiale	Timothy Roe
2	André Greipel	André Greipel	Timothy Roe	André Greipel	Jürgen Roelandts	Ag2r–La Mondiale	David Kemp
3	Manuel Cardoso	André Greipel	Thomas Rohregger	André Greipel	Jürgen Roelandts	Ag2r–La Mondiale	Simon Clarke
4	André Greipel	André Greipel	Thomas Rohregger	André Greipel	Jürgen Roelandts	Ag2r–La Mondiale	Stef Clement
5	Luis León Sánchez	André Greipel	Thomas Rohregger	André Greipel	Jürgen Roelandts	Ag2r–La Mondiale	Cadel Evans
6	Christopher Sutton	André Greipel	Thomas Rohregger	André Greipel	Jürgen Roelandts	Ag2r–La Mondiale	Wesley Sulzberger
Final		André Greipel	Thomas Rohregger	André Greipel	Jürgen Roelandts	Ag2r–La Mondiale	—
