= Brammeier =

Brammeier is a surname. Notable people with the surname include:

- Matt Brammeier (born 1985), Welsh cyclist and coach
- Nikki Brammeier (born 1986), English cyclist
