= Fritz Hirschfeld =

German jurist

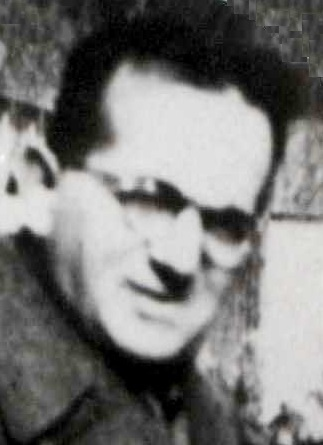
Fritz Hirschfeld

Fritz Hirschfeld (22 October 1886 in Berlin – 11 October 1944 in Auschwitz) was a German jurist of Jewish descent, a judge in Potsdam, a refugee in the Netherlands, interned in the Westerbork transit camp and in the Theresienstadt concentration camp and murdered in the Auschwitz extermination camp. After his conversion he also worked as a translator and author.

In March 2019, a Stolperstein (stumbling stone) for Fritz Hirschfeld was laid in Nieuwkuijk in the Netherlands on the site of the St. Gertrudisgesticht, which was demolished in 1969. Another stumbling stone has been in place since December 2019 in Potsdam, Griebnitzstraße 8. A hall in the Potsdam Regional Court has been named after him.
