= Matt Brammeier =

Irish-Welsh cyclist

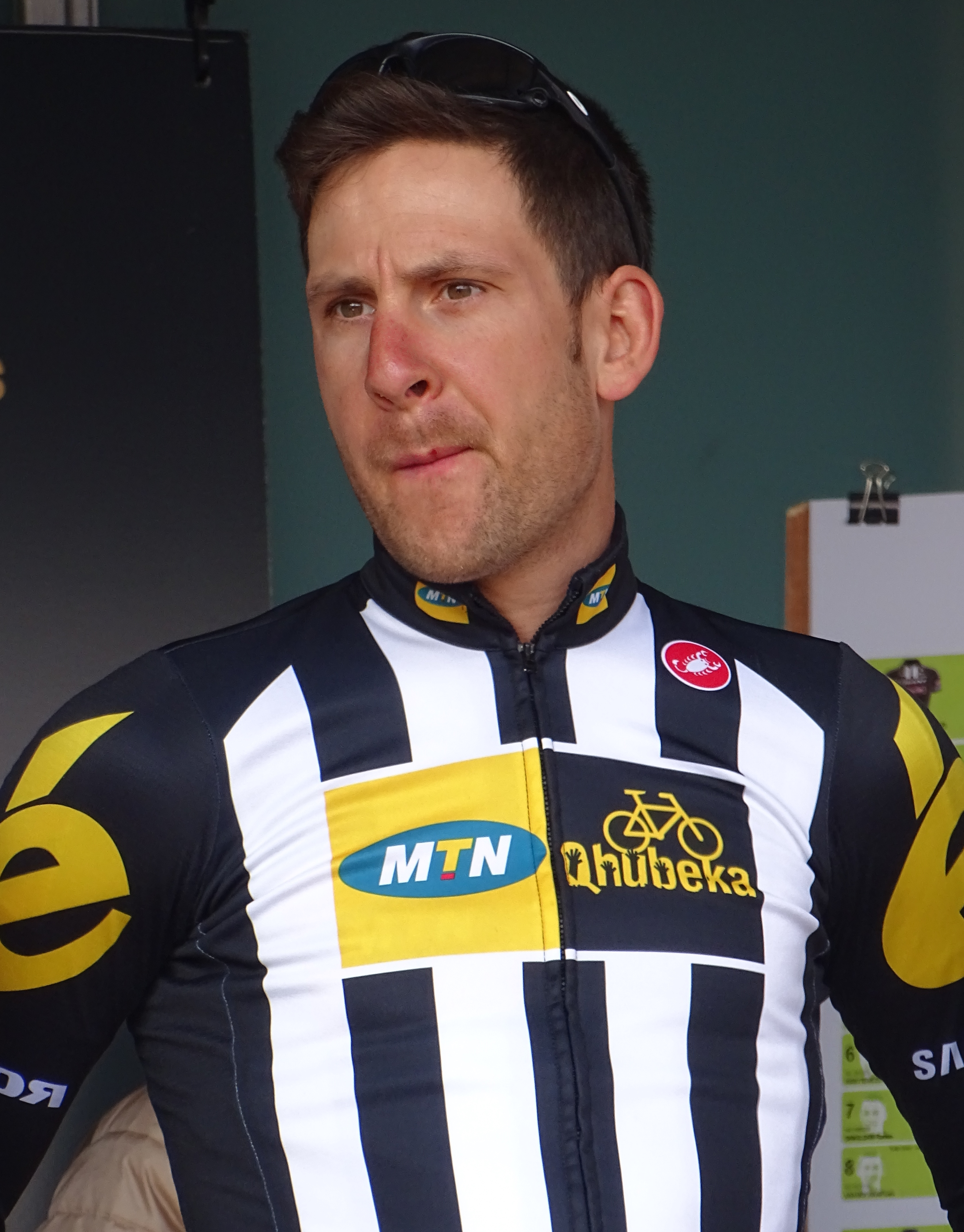
- Brammeier at the 2015 Scheldeprijs.

Personal information
- Full name: Matthew Martin Brammeier
- Born: 7 June 1985 (age 41) Liverpool, England

Cycling career
- Sport: Cycling
- Current team: Retired
- Disciplines: Road; Track
- Role: Rider (retired); Coach

Professional teams
- 2006: DFL-Cyclingnews-Litespeed
- 2007–2008: Profel Ziegler Continental Team
- 2009–2010: An Post–M.Donnelly–Grant Thornton–Sean Kelly
- 2011: HTC–Highroad
- 2012: Omega Pharma–Quick-Step
- 2013: Champion System
- 2014: Synergy Baku
- 2015–2016: MTN–Qhubeka
- 2017–2018: Aqua Blue Sport

Major wins
- One-day races and Classics National Time Trial Championships (2011) National Road Race Championships (2010–2013)

Matthew Martin Brammeier (born 7 June 1985) is a former professional cyclist, who competed professionally between 2006 and 2018 for nine different professional teams. Upon retiring, Brammeier became a coach for British Cycling. He won five titles at the Irish National Cycling Championships, winning the road race four times and the time trial once.

== Career ==
Born in Liverpool, Brammeier was selected to ride the 2003 UCI Track Cycling World Championships and represented Wales at the 2006 Commonwealth Games. Brammeier rode for DFL-Cyclingnews-Litespeed in 2006 and signed for Profel Ziegler Continental Team for the 2007 season.

Brammeier was involved in an accident in November 2007, when he was struck by a cement mixing lorry whilst training. He broke both his legs but returned to cycling retaining his contract with Profel in Belgium.

He declared Irish nationality in advance of the 2009–10 track season and made a successful debut when finishing 4th in the scratch race at the Manchester World Cup meeting in October '09. He became road race champion at the Irish National Cycling Championships in June 2010 by beating breakaway partner and defending champion Nicolas Roche.

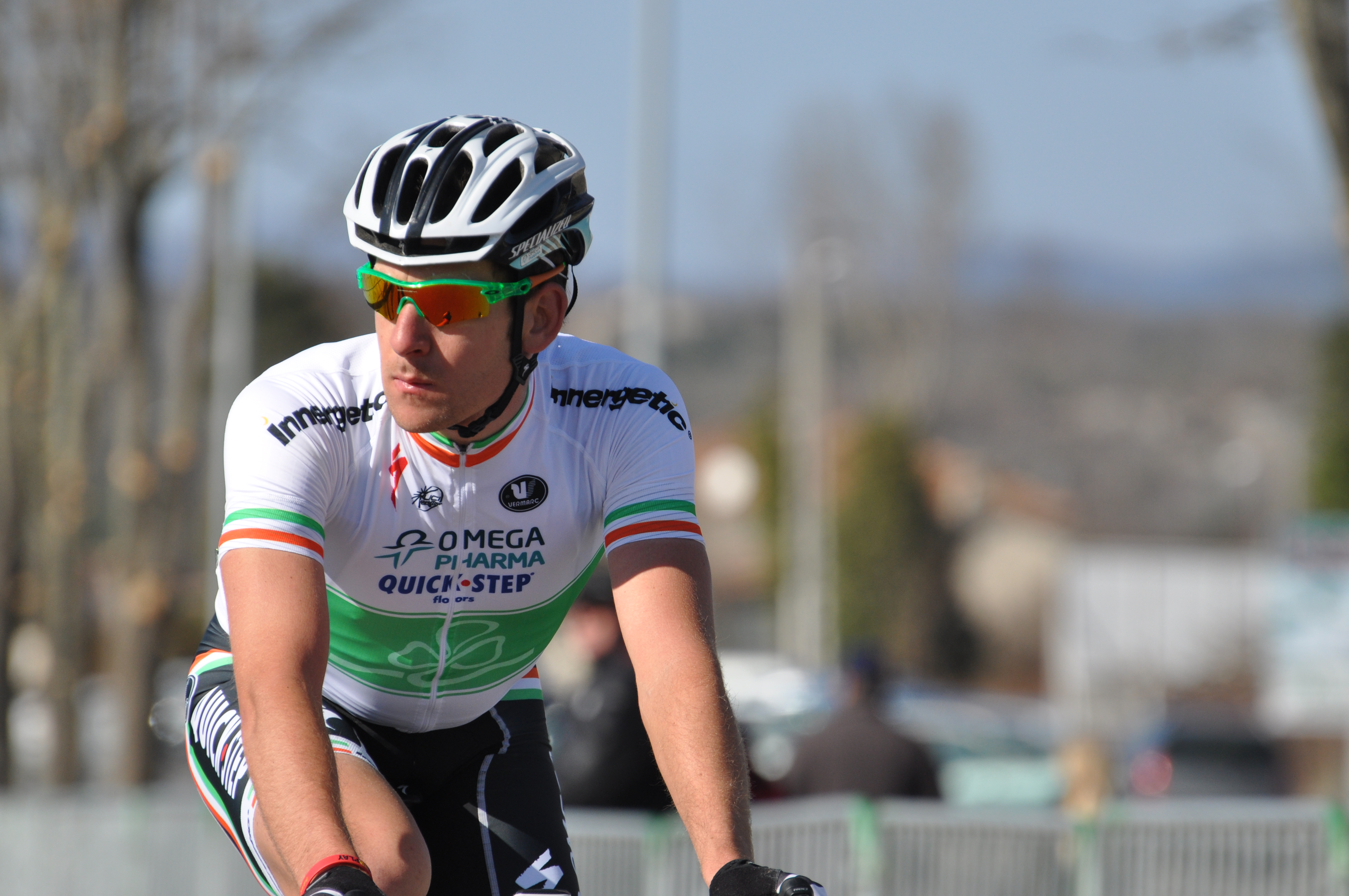
Brammeier, wearing the Irish national champion's jersey, in 2012.

In 2011, he defended his Irish Elite Road Race title, and also won the National Elite Time Trial title. He joined Omega Pharma–Quick-Step for the 2012 season, before joining Champion System for 2013.

After the collapse of Champion System, Brammeier signed a contract with the Synergy Baku team, the Azerbaijan-backed Continental team.

On 9 August 2015, he collided with a team car during Stage 6 of the Tour of Utah. He was immediately taken to hospital following the incident and was diagnosed with injuries to his pelvis, ribs and lung.

In June 2018 Brammeier announced his retirement from competition and his appointment to the position of lead academy coach to British Cycling's men's endurance programme from August of that year, with additional responsibility for the men's elite road team in international competition, taking over the latter from Rod Ellingworth.

== Major results ==
2002
1st Points classification Junior Tour of Wales
2003
British National Junior Road Championships

1st Road race
1st Time trial

1st Chase Classic Under-23
1st Rod Ellis Memorial
1st Alan Jewl Memorial
1st Weaver Valley
2nd Overall Darley Moor Stage Race

1st Stage 3 (ITT)

2nd Bath Road Race (National Series)
2nd Junior Tour of the Peaks
4th Overall Tour de l'Avenir
2004
1st Frank Morgan Road race
2nd Horwich National Criterium
3rd Seacroft Road Race
2005
1st John Parkinson Memorial Road race
5th Overall Flèche du Sud
2007
1st Time trial, British National Under-23 Road Championships
2010
1st Road race, Irish National Cycling Championships
3rd Grote Prijs Stad Geel
3rd Halfords Tour Series Belfast
4th Halfords Tour Series Dublin
8th Overall Mi-Août en Bretagne
2011
Irish National Cycling Championships

1st Road race
1st Time trial

2012
1st Road race, Irish National Cycling Championships
2013
1st Road race, Irish National Cycling Championships
2nd GP Briek Schotte
2014
1st Mountains classification Tour de Langkawi
6th Overall Tour of China I
2015
1st Stage 4 Ster ZLM Toer
2016
2nd Road race, Irish National Cycling Championships
