= Sebastian Langeveld =

Dutch road bicycle racer

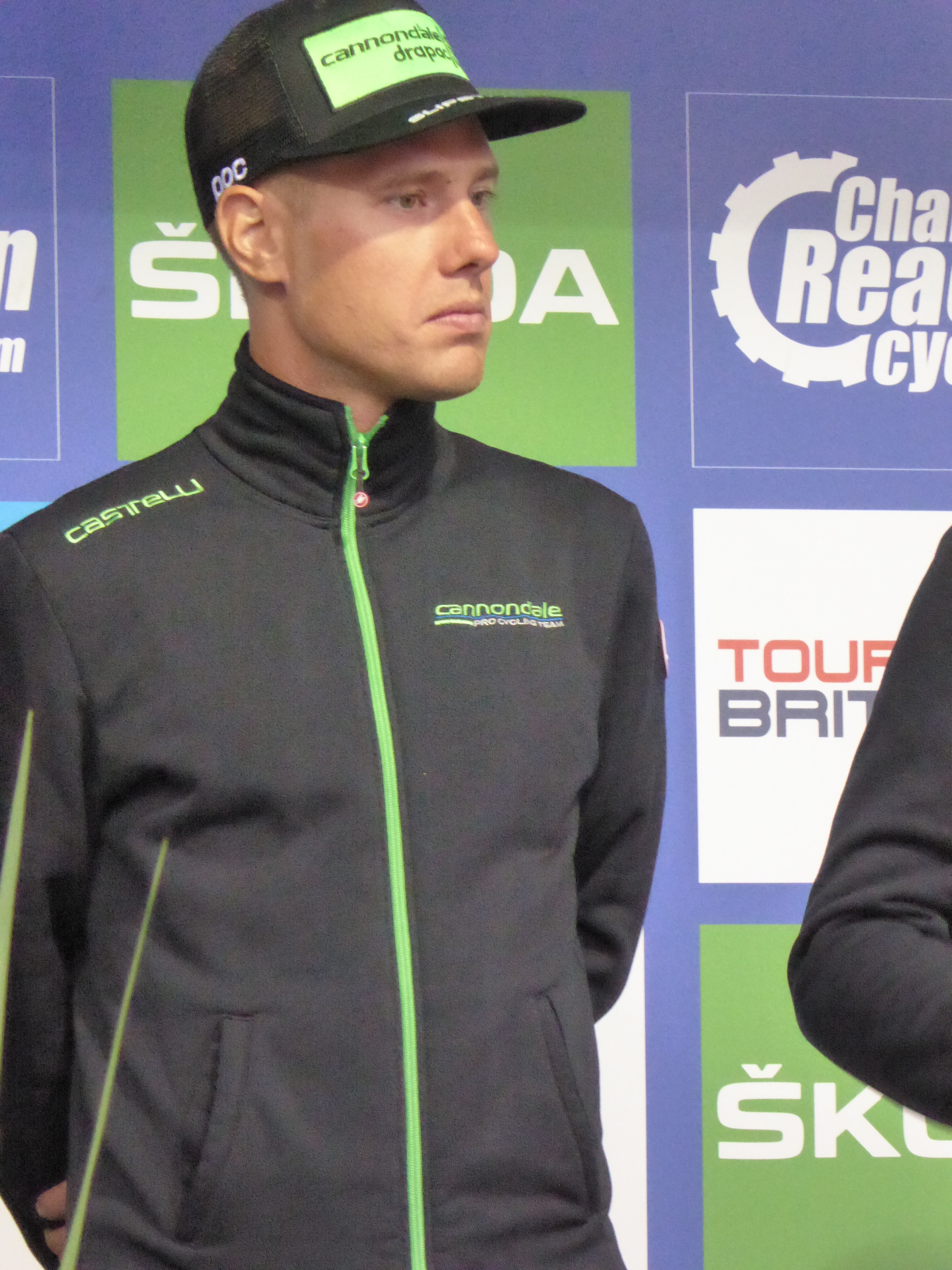
- Langeveld at the 2016 Tour of Britain

Personal information
- Full name: Sebastian Langeveld
- Born: 17 January 1985 (age 41) Leiden, Netherlands
- Height: 1.78 m (5 ft 10 in)
- Weight: 68 kg (150 lb)

Cycling career
- Sport: Cycling
- Current team: EF Education–EasyPost
- Discipline: Road
- Role: Rider
- Rider type: Classics specialist

Amateur team
- 2004–2005: Van Vliet–EBH Advocaten

Professional teams
- 2006: Skil–Shimano
- 2007–2011: Rabobank
- 2012–2013: GreenEDGE
- 2014–2022: Garmin–Sharp

Major wins
- Single-day races and Classics National Road Race Championships (2014) Omloop Het Nieuwsblad (2011)
Medal record
Men's road bicycle racing
Representing Orica–GreenEDGE
World Championships
Bronze medal – third place	2012 Valkenburg	Team time trial

Sebastian Langeveld (born 17 January 1985) is a former Dutch professional road racing cyclist, who last rode for UCI WorldTeam EF Education–EasyPost where he is now a sports director.

== Career ==
His biggest win to date was the 2011 Omloop Het Nieuwsblad with Rabobank where he beat Juan Antonio Flecha in a photofinish. On 17 August 2011, it was announced that Langeveld was joining Australian team GreenEDGE for its début season in 2012. On 19 September 2013, Langeveld signed with Garmin–Sharp for the 2014 and 2015 seasons.

== Major results ==
2003
10th Road race, UCI Junior Road World Championships
2004
8th Overall Flèche du Sud

1st Stage 2

2005
1st Road race, National Under-23 Road Championships
1st Stage 7 Olympia's Tour
2nd Ronde van Vlaanderen U23
2nd Omloop der Kempen
7th Paris–Roubaix Espoirs
2006
1st Grand Prix Pino Cerami
2nd Road race, National Road Championships
7th GP Herning
9th Overall Four Days of Dunkirk
2007
1st Overall Ster Elektrotoer
2nd Road race, National Road Championships
9th Overall Tour de Luxembourg
2008
2nd Trofeo Sóller
2nd Kuurne–Brussels–Kuurne
4th Trofeo Pollença
6th Overall Tour de Luxembourg
2009
1st Egmond-pier-Egmond
1st Grote Prijs Jef Scherens
2nd Overall Sachsen Tour

1st Stages 2 & 4

2nd Kampioenschap van Vlaanderen
3rd Overall Eneco Tour
6th Overall Ster Elektrotoer
9th E3 Prijs Vlaanderen
10th Overall Delta Tour Zeeland
2010
2nd Overall Tour du Limousin

1st Young rider classification

6th E3 Prijs Vlaanderen
10th Kuurne–Brussels–Kuurne
2011
1st Omloop Het Nieuwsblad
1st Stage 1 (TTT) Tirreno–Adriatico
4th Trofeo Deia
5th Trofeo Inca
5th Tour of Flanders
2012
1st Stage 1 (TTT) Tirreno–Adriatico
3rd Team time trial, UCI Road World Championships
5th Road race, National Road Championships
9th Overall Eneco Tour

1st Stage 2 (TTT)

2013
3rd Road race, National Road Championships
5th E3 Harelbeke
7th Paris–Roubaix
10th Tour of Flanders
2014
National Road Championships

1st Road race
2nd Time trial

1st Egmond-pier-Egmond
3rd Amstel Curaçao
8th Paris–Roubaix
9th Overall Eneco Tour
10th Tour of Flanders
2015
3rd Egmond-pier-Egmond
2016
2nd Overall Czech Cycling Tour

1st Stage 1 (TTT)

2017
3rd Paris–Roubaix
2018
8th Tacx Pro Classic
2019
2nd Time trial, National Road Championships
7th Overall Étoile de Bessèges
10th Time trial, UEC European Road Championships
10th Paris–Roubaix
Lanterne rouge, Tour de France
2020
1st Egmond-pier-Egmond
2021
2nd Time trial, National Road Championships

=== Grand Tour general classification results timeline ===
Grand Tour	2007	2008	2009	2010	2011	2012	2013	2014	2015	2016	2017	2018	2019	2020
Giro d'Italia	Has not yet contested during his career													
Tour de France	—	130	—	—	—	150	—	140	DNF	DNF	—	155	—	—
/ Vuelta a España	112	—	—	114	—	—	—	—	—	—	—	128	—	—

=== Classics results timeline ===
Monument	2006	2007	2008	2009	2010	2011	2012	2013	2014	2015	2016	2017	2018	2019	2020	2021
Milan–San Remo	—	—	43	21	62	100	40	23	14	14	172	—	78	105	—	131
Tour of Flanders	—	—	18	33	22	5	DNF	10	10	54	114	72	22	15	60	109
Paris–Roubaix	65	—	DNF	94	36	26	—	7	8	126	84	3	DNF	10	NH	16
Liège–Bastogne–Liège	—	—	—	—	—	—	—	—	—	DNF	—	—	—	—	—	—
Giro di Lombardia	—	—	—	DNF	DNF	—	DNF	—	—	—	—	—	—	—	—	—
Classic	2006	2007	2008	2009	2010	2011	2012	2013	2014	2015	2016	2017	2018	2019	2020	2021
Omloop Het Nieuwsblad	—	63	88	94	DNF	1	DNF	44	12	—	—	38	DNF	15	—	81
Kuurne–Brussels–Kuurne	—	—	2	27	10	DNF	—	NH	29	—	—	77	86	32	—	69
Dwars door Vlaanderen	—	—	—	DNF	24	—	—	—	—	DNF	—	19	DNF	106	NH	118
E3 Prijs Vlaanderen	—	—	65	9	6	58	24	5	57	DNF	DNF	16	93	12	NH	DNF
Gent–Wevelgem	—	—	—	—	—	123	26	DNF	60	—	DNF	99	50	26	DNF	DNF

Legend
—	Did not compete
DNF	Did not finish
IP	In progress
NH	Not held

== See also ==
- List of Dutch Olympic cyclists

Sporting positions
Preceded by Johnny Hoogerland	Dutch National Road Race Championships; Winner; 2014	Succeeded by Niki Terpstra
