= Evert Verbist =

Belgian cyclist

Personal information
- Full name: Evert Verbist
- Born: 27 June 1984 (age 42) Duffel, Belgium
- Height: 1.79 m (5 ft 10 in)
- Weight: 73 kg (161 lb)

Cycling career
- Sport: Cycling
- Current team: Retired
- Discipline: Road
- Role: Rider

Amateur teams
- 2009–2010: Cavale–Van Goethem–Prorace
- 2013: Melbotech
- 2014: Bofrost–Prorace

Professional teams
- 2003: Quick Step–Davitamon–Latexco
- 2005: Profel Cycling Team
- 2006–2008: Chocolade Jacques–Topsport Vlaanderen
- 2011–2012: Veranda's Willems–Accent

Evert Verbist (born 27 June 1984) is a Belgian former professional road bicycle racer. Verbist has also rode for the Topsport Vlaanderen and Accent.jobs–Willems Veranda's professional teams. He was born in Duffel.

Verbist's final competitive season was 2014, where he competed for amateur team Bofrost–Prorace.

== Major results ==
2005
10th Memorial Rik Van Steenbergen
2006
1st De Vlaamse Pijl
1st Beverbeek Classic
8th Rund um Köln
2007
6th Nationale Sluitingprijs
2009
3rd Memorial Philippe Van Coningsloo
2011
1st Beverbeek Classic
8th Tour de Vendée
10th Châteauroux Classic
10th Circuit de Wallonie
2012
9th Paris–Camembert
9th Omloop van het Waasland
