= Sigma Sport =

German sports equipment manufacturer

- Founded: 1981, Neustadt an der Weinstraße, Germany
- Products: Heart rate monitors, Bike Computers, Sport Lighting
- Website: www.sigmasport.com

Sigma Sport is a German manufacturer of electronic sports equipment.

== Products ==
Rox and Topline are product lines of heart rate monitors, altimeters, and bike computers.

== See also ==
- Polar Electro
- Garmin Forerunner
