= Andy Cappelle =

Belgian cyclist

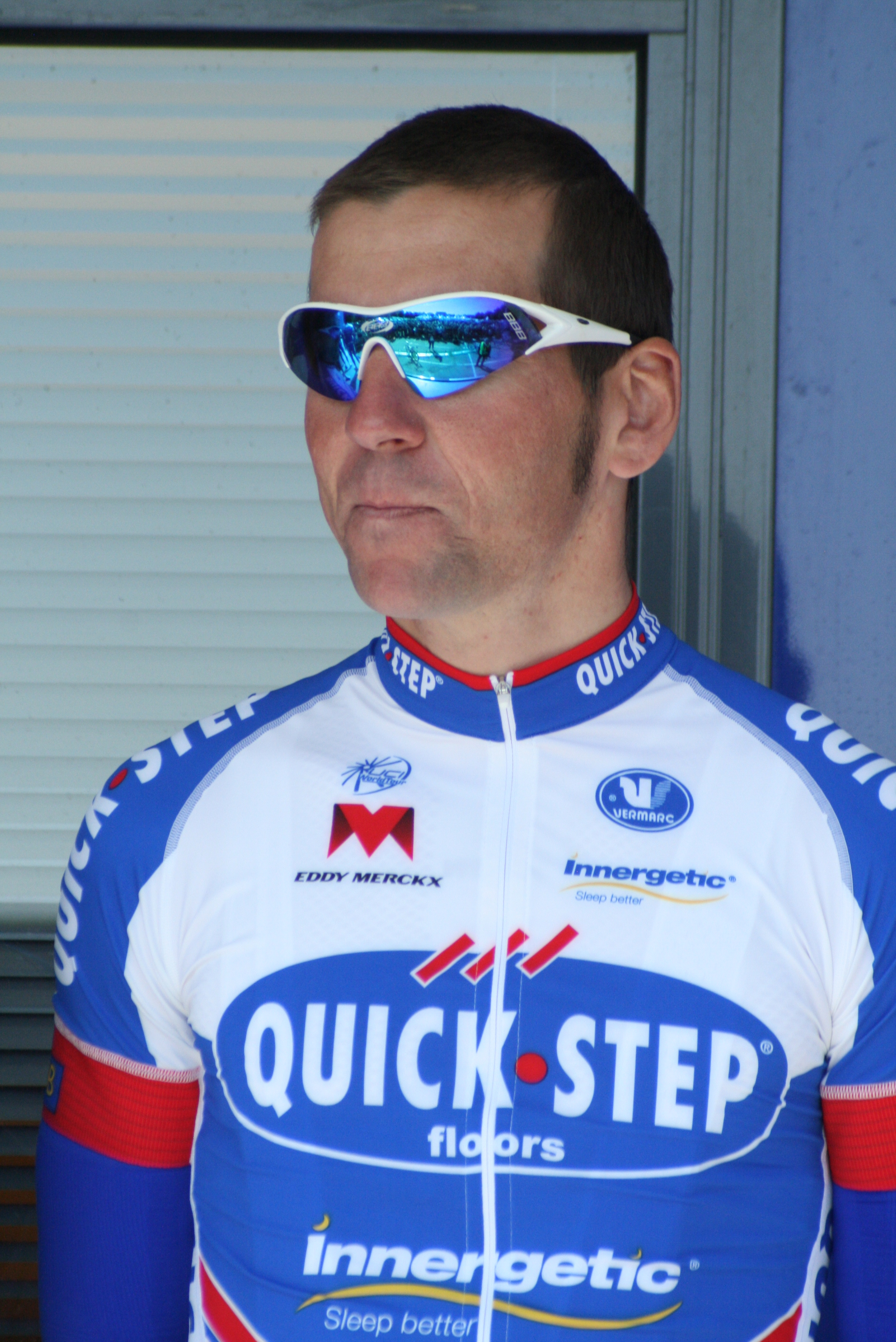
- Cappelle at the 2011 Four Days of Dunkirk

Personal information
- Full name: Andy Cappelle
- Born: 30 April 1979 (age 47) Ostend, Belgium

Cycling career
- Sport: Cycling
- Current team: Retired
- Discipline: Road
- Role: Rider

Amateur team
- 2000: Collstrop-De Federale Verzekeringen

Professional teams
- 2001: Saint Quentin-Oktos
- 2002–2004: Marlux-Ville de Charleroi
- 2006–2008: Landbouwkrediet–Colnago
- 2009: Palmans-Cras
- 2010: Verandas Willems
- 2011: Quick-Step
- 2012–2013: Accent.jobs–Willems Veranda's

Major wins
- Sparkassen Giro Bochum (2007); Polynormande (2010)

Andy Cappelle (born 30 April 1979) is a Belgian former professional road cyclist.

Cappelle retired at the end of the 2013 season, after thirteen years as a professional.

== Palmarès ==
1999
1st National Under-23 Road Race Championships
2000
1st National Under-23 Road Race Championships
5th Omloop van het Houtland
2001
6th Overall Tour of Japan
2002
1st GP Stad Vilvoorde
3rd Duo Normand
3rd Brussel–Ingooigem
3rd Kampioenschap van Vlaanderen
7th Grand Prix Eddy Merckx
2003
1st Egmond-pier-Egmond
2nd Omloop van het Waasland
2006
2nd Internatie Reningelst
3rd Nationale Sluitingsprijs
5th Boucles de l'Aulne
9th Overall Driedaagse van West-Vlaanderen
2007
1st Egmond-pier-Egmond
1st Sparkassen Giro Bochum
1st Stage 3 Regio-Tour
2nd Kampioenschap van Vlaanderen
2nd Grand Prix d'Isbergues
5th Internatie Reningelst
6th Overall Paris–Corrèze
7th Memorial Rik Van Steenbergen
9th Overall Tour de Wallonie
2008
10th Overall Driedaagse van West-Vlaanderen
2009
7th Grand Prix de Pérenchies
8th Duo Normand
2010
1st Polynormande
1st Stage 3 Rhône-Alpes Isère Tour
2nd Ronde van Drenthe
2nd Ronde van Overijssel
7th Dwars door Drenthe
8th Halle–Ingooigem
2011
2nd Overall La Tropicale Amissa Bongo
2012
1st Sprints classification Three Days of De Panne
2nd Kustpijl
