= 2011 Omloop Het Nieuwsblad =

- Event poster with previous winner Juan Antonio Flecha

Race details
- Dates: 26 February
- Stages: 1
- Distance: 203 km (126 mi)
- Winning time: 5h 18' 03"

Results
	Winner	Sebastian Langeveld (NED)	(Rabobank)
	Second	Juan Antonio Flecha (ESP)	(Team Sky)
	Third	Mathew Hayman (AUS)	(Team Sky)

The 2011 Omloop Het Nieuwsblad took place on 26 February 2011. It was the 66th edition of the international classic Omloop Het Nieuwsblad. This year's Omloop started and ended at St. Peter's Square in Ghent, Belgium and spanned 203 kilometers in the province of East Flanders. The race was the first 1.HC event in the 2011 UCI World Ranking.

This year's edition of the race featured more cobblestones when compared to previous editions, as it crossed a 2 kilometer cobblestone section three times. Former rider and race organizer Peter Van Petegem also decreased the number of climbs from twelve to nine, notably omitting the infamous Muur van Geraardsbergen. According to the race organization, the race course was "slightly tough[ened] overall".

Rabobank's Sebastian Langeveld (NED) beat Team Sky's Juan Antonio Flecha of Spain after a breakaway of 53 kilometers. Langeveld beat Flecha in a two-man sprint under wet and cold conditions. The other pre-race favourites Tom Boonen, Stijn Devolder and Thor Hushovd finished 5 minutes after Langeveld.

== Teams ==
As this was a UCI 1.HC event, the organizers, the Flanders Classics Federation, were allowed to invite UCI ProTeams (max 80% of the total field), UCI Professional Continental teams, and UCI Continental teams. Non ProTeams teams are indicated by an asterisk below. Each of the 22 teams were permitted up to eight riders, for a total of 176 riders.

- Ag2r–La Mondiale
- Acqua & Sapone*
- BMC Racing Team
- Bretagne–Schuller*
- Cofidis*
- Team Europcar*
- FDJ*
- Garmin–Cervélo
- HTC–Highroad
- Landbouwkrediet*
- Leopard Trek
- Omega Pharma–Lotto
- Quick-Step
- Rabobank
- Saur–Sojasun*
- Skil–Shimano*
- Team Katusha
- Team NetApp*
- Team Sky
- Topsport Vlaanderen–Mercator*
- Vacansoleil–DCM
- Veranda's Willems–Accent*

== Pre-Race Favorites ==
Pre-race favorites included:

- Tom Boonen (BEL) – 2005 UCI World Road Race Champion, 3 time Paris–Roubaix Champion, 2 time Tour of Flanders Champion
- Stijn Devolder (BEL) – 2 time Tour of Flanders Champion
- Philippe Gilbert (BEL) – 2 time Giro di Lombardia Champion, 2010 Amstel Gold Race Champion, 2 time Omloop Het Nieuwsblad Champion
- Nick Nuyens (BEL) – 2005 Omloop Het Volk Champion
- Edvald Boasson Hagen (NOR) – 2009 Gent–Wevelgem Champion
- Thor Hushovd (NOR) – 2010 UCI World Road Race Champion, 2009 Omloop Het Nieuwsblad Champion
- Juan Antonio Flecha (ESP) – 2010 Omloop Het Nieuwsblad Champion
- Filippo Pozzato (ITA) – 2006 Milan–San Remo Champion, 2007 Omloop Het Volk Champion
- Lars Boom (NED) – 2008 UCI World Cyclo-Cross Champion

Classics riders Fabian Cancellara and Heinrich Haussler decided to skip the race in order to focus on three of cycling's monuments: Milan–San Remo, Tour of Flanders, and Paris–Roubaix.

== Race Overview ==
The race started at about 11:45 AM Central European Time with 173 riders under wet and cold conditions. A breakaway of eight riders gained a maximum of 8 minutes and 30 seconds over the peloton. At about 65 kilometers to go, pre-race favorite Tom Boonen attacked the peloton on the Taaienberg climb – also known as the Boonenberg. Boonen was quickly chased down by World Champion Thor Hushovd. At this time the peloton was 38 seconds behind the breakaway. With 55 kilometers remaining, the last riders from the breakaway were caught. At this point, eventual race winner Sebastian Langeveld attacked solo on the Eikenberg climb. With 37 kilometers remaining, Langeveld held a minute advantage to a group of ten riders that included Juan Antonio Flecha, Mathew Hayman, Luca Paolini, Niki Terpstra, Martijn Maaskant, Manuel Quinziato, Jürgen Roelandts, Lars Boom, Frédéric Amorison, and John Degenkolb and held a two-minute advantage to many of the pre-race favorites.

Juan Antonio Flecha (ESP), taking advantage of a crash between Luca Paolini and Martijn Maaskant, attacked on the Paddestraat to chase after solo leader Langeveld. When Flecha came within 13 seconds of Langeveld, Langeveld waited for the Spaniard. The duo started working together with 13 kilometers to go. Fearing a sprint finish with Langeveld, Flecha attacked with 5 kilometers to go, however, Langeveld quickly responded. With the finish line in sight, Langeveld opened up the sprint and beat Flecha by centimeters. Flecha's Team Sky teammate, Mathew Hayman, won the sprint for third place, as many of the race favorites finished 5 minutes behind.

== Results ==
Result
Rank	Rider	Team	Time
1	Sebastian Langeveld (NED)	Rabobank	5h 18' 03"
2	Juan Antonio Flecha (ESP)	Team Sky	+ 0"
3	Mathew Hayman (AUS)	Team Sky	+ 1' 01"
4	Yoann Offredo (FRA)	FDJ	+ 1' 04"
5	Luca Paolini (ITA)	Team Katusha	+ 1' 21"
6	Niki Terpstra (NED)	Quick-Step	+ 1' 24"
7	Martijn Maaskant (NED)	Garmin–Cervélo	+ 1' 30"
8	Manuel Quinziato (ITA)	BMC Racing Team	+ 1' 30"
9	Jürgen Roelandts (BEL)	Omega Pharma–Lotto	+ 1' 30"
10	Lars Boom (NED)	Rabobank	+ 1' 30"

== Race Radios Protest ==
The UCI introduced a ban on radio communication between team management and riders at all races (besides those belonging to the UCI World Tour) starting January 1, 2011. Because the Omloop Het Nieuwsblad is a 1.HC event, riders planned to protest the ban by wearing earpieces at the start of the race. The planned protest was called off by the AIGCP after the UCI threatened to remove the UCI race commissaries from the race. This would have cancelled the race since commissaries are required for the race's insurance policies. A protest was previously executed at Challenge Mallorca's Trofeo Palma Mallorca race on February 6, 2011. The UCI commissaries refused to officiate the race, however the race continued. Tyler Farrar's win was not entered into the UCI's record books.
