= Lenie Dijkstra =

Dutch cyclist (born 1967)

Personal information
- Born: 3 October 1967 (age 59) Joure, Netherlands

Cycling career
- Sport: Cycling
- Current team: Retired
- Disciplines: Road and Mountainbike
- Role: Rider

Professional teams
- 2000: Toscany-Ahoy
- 2001–2004: Bik-Powerplate

Lenie Dijkstra (born 3 October 1967 in Joure, Friesland) is a female road and mountain bike racing cyclist from the Netherlands. Her first victory was the Dutch Food Valley Classic in 1990. She became Dutch National Time Trial Champion in 1992.
