= Beverbeek Classic =

Belgian cycling race (1998-2013)

Race details
- Date: Late-February
- Region: Hamont Achel, Limburg, Belgium
- English name: Beverbeek Classic
- Discipline: Road race
- Competition: UCI Europe Tour
- Type: Single-day
- Web site: www.beverbeekclassic.com

History
- First edition: 1998
- Editions: 15 (as of 2013)
- First winner: Pascal Appeldoorn (NED)
- Most wins: Evert Verbist (BEL) (2 wins)
- Most recent: Nick van der Lijke (NED)

Beverbeek Classic is a single-day bicycle road race held annually in Hamont-Achel, in the Belgian region of Limburg. From 1998 to 2003, it was reserved to amateurs. Since 2005, it was organized as a 1.2 event on the UCI Europe Tour.

== Winners ==
Year	Country	Rider	Team
1998	Netherlands	Pascal Appeldoorn	AXA Cycling Team
1999	Netherlands	Marcel Luppes	AXA Cycling Team
2000	Belgium	Nico Mestdagh	ISCA Team
2001	Belgium	Koen Das	Nurnberger
2002	Belgium	Philip Vereecke	Mez Team
2003	Netherlands	Mark Vlijm	AXA Cycling Team
2004	No race		
2005	Belgium	Jarno Van Mingeroet	Profel Cycling Team
2006	Belgium	Evert Verbist	Chocolade Jacques–Topsport Vlaanderen
2007	Belgium	Nico Sijmens	Landbouwkrediet–Tönissteiner
2008	Belgium	Johan Coenen	Topsport Vlaanderen
2009	Germany	Andreas Schillinger	Team Nutrixxion–Sparkasse
2010	Belgium	Yannick Eijssen	PWS Eijssen
2011	Belgium	Evert Verbist	Veranda's Willems–Accent
2012	Belgium	Tom Van Asbroeck	Topsport Vlaanderen–Mercator
2013	Netherlands	Nick van der Lijke	Rabobank Development Team
