= 2011 Tour of Flanders =

2011 UCI World Tour, race 7 of 27
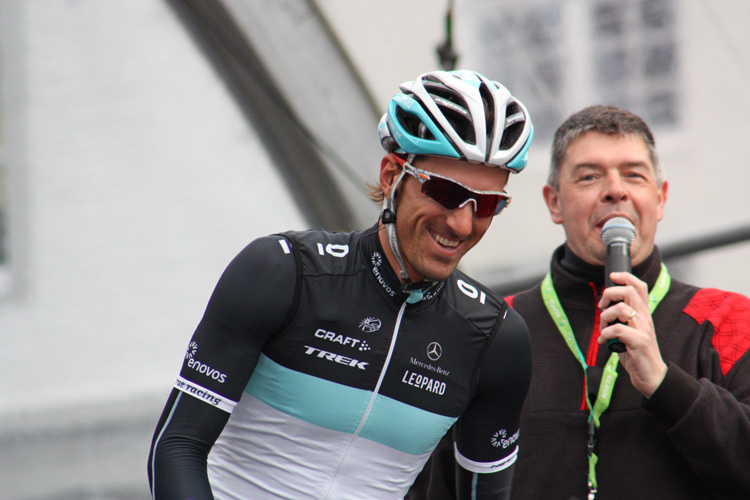
- Pre-race favourite Fabian Cancellara at the start of the race.

Race details
- Dates: 3 April 2011
- Stages: 1
- Distance: 256.3 km (159.3 mi)
- Winning time: 6h 00' 42"

Results
	Winner	Nick Nuyens (BEL)	(Saxo Bank–SunGard)
	Second	Sylvain Chavanel (FRA)	(Quick-Step)
	Third	Fabian Cancellara (SUI)	(Leopard Trek)

The 2011 Tour of Flanders cycle race was the 95th edition of this monumental classic and took place on 3 April. The course was 256.3 kilometres (159.3 mi) long and was held between Bruges and Ninove. The race was won by Nick Nuyens ahead of Sylvain Chavanel and Fabian Cancellara.

== Course ==
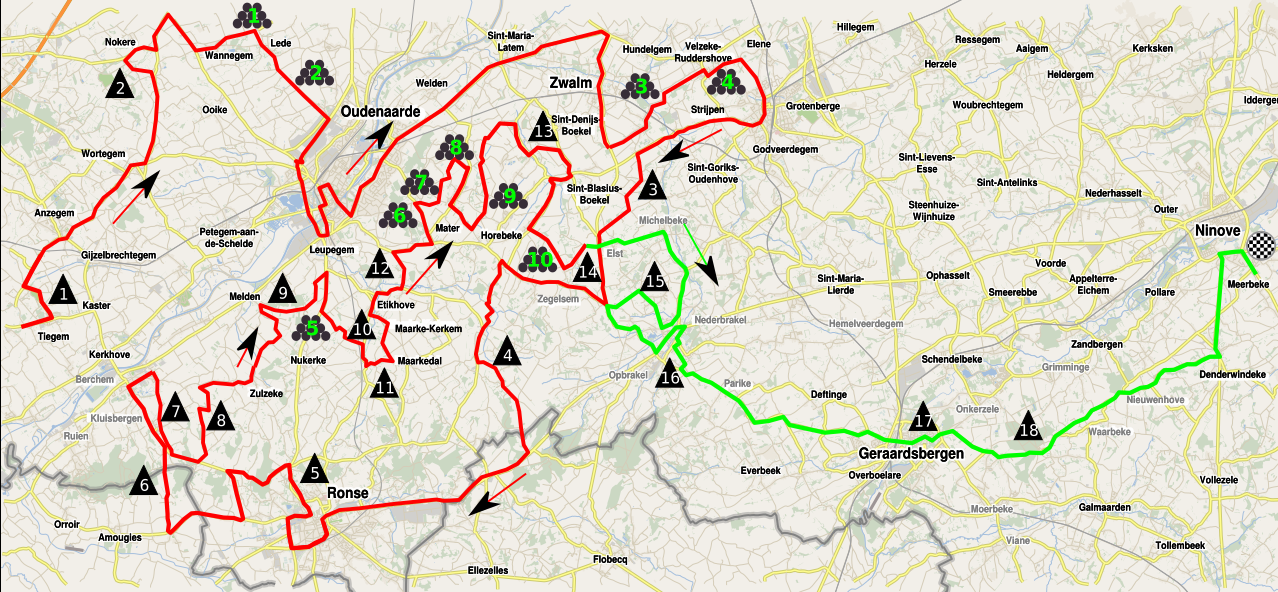
Map of the Tour of Flanders 2011, starting with the first hill.

The 18 Ronde van Vlaanderen hills were:

Number	Kilometer	Name
1	70	Tiegemberg
2	80	Nokereberg
3	127	Rekelberg
4	139	Kaperij
5	154	Kruisberg
6	164	Knokteberg
7	171	Oude Kwaremont
8	175	Paterberg
9	181	Koppenberg
10	187	Steenbeekdries
11	190	Taaienberg
12	194	Eikenberg
13	209	Molenberg
14	216	Leberg
15	225	Valkenberg
16	232	Tenbosse
17	242	Muur-Kapelmuur
18	246	Bosberg

== General standings ==
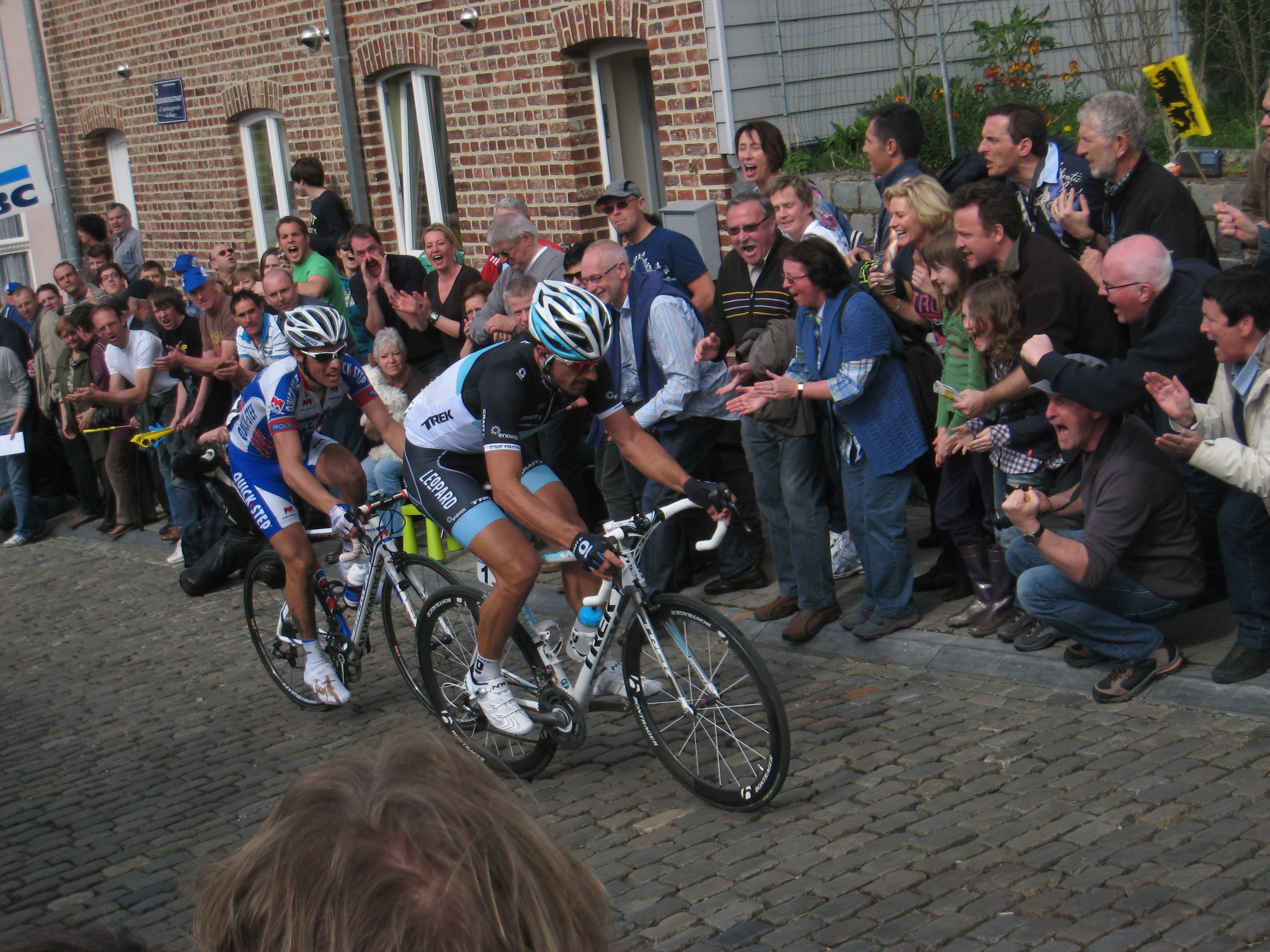
Cancellara and Chavanel lead the race up the Muur-Kapelmuur

	Cyclist	Team	Time	UCI World Tour Points
1	Nick Nuyens (BEL)	Saxo Bank–SunGard	6h 00' 42"	100
2	Sylvain Chavanel (FRA)	Quick-Step	s.t.	80
3	Fabian Cancellara (SUI)	Leopard Trek	s.t.	70
4	Tom Boonen (BEL)	Quick-Step	+ 2"	60
5	Sebastian Langeveld (NED)	Rabobank	+ 8"	50
6	George Hincapie (USA)	BMC Racing Team	+ 8"	40
7	Bjorn Leukemans (BEL)	Vacansoleil–DCM	+ 8"	30
8	Staf Scheirlinckx (BEL)	Veranda's Willems–Accent	+ 8"	–
9	Philippe Gilbert (BEL)	Omega Pharma–Lotto	+ 8"	10
10	Geraint Thomas (GBR)	Team Sky	+ 8"	4
