= Rob Goris =

Belgian cyclist

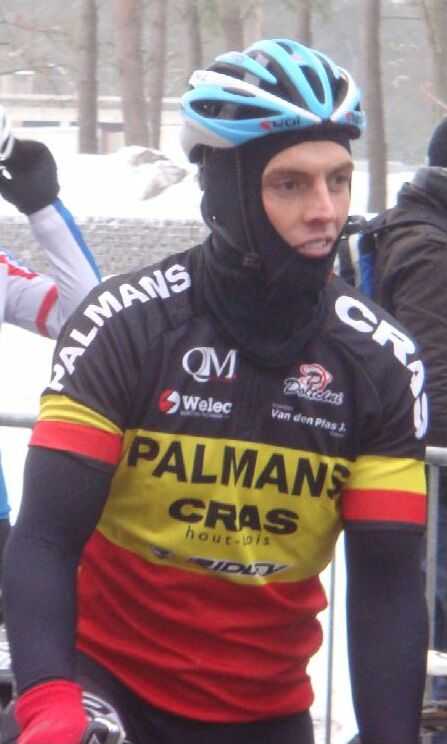
- Goris in 2010.

Personal information
- Full name: Rob Goris
- Born: 16 March 1982 Herentals, Belgium
- Died: 5 July 2012 (aged 30) Rouen, France

Cycling career
- Sport: Cycling
- Discipline: Road
- Role: Rider

Amateur team
- 2010: Palmans Cras

Professional team
- 2011–2012: Veranda's Willems–Accent

Major wins
- National Amateur Road Race Champion (2010)

Rob Goris (16 March 1982 – 5 July 2012) was a Belgian professional road racing cyclist who rode for UCI Professional Continental Team team Accent.jobs–Willems Veranda's.

== Biography ==
Before becoming a cyclist he competed at national level in ice hockey. From 1998 to 2009, Goris played ice hockey for HYC Herentals and Olympia Heist op den Berg, winning the Belgian national championship three times. He also took part in three World Championships with the Belgian national team, where he served as captain. After HYC Herentals won the title in 2009, Goris retired from the ice hockey to focus on a career in cycling.

In 2010, he joined the UCI Continental team Palmans–Cras. That year, he won the Antwerpse Havenpijl and the Belgian National Road Race Championships (Belgian national road race championship for elite riders without a professional contract).

== Death ==
He died of a heart attack in his hotel room in Rouen while visiting the 2012 Tour de France. A funeral service was held for Goris in Herentals, Belgium, at the Sint-Waldetrudis Church. A bicycle and a pair of hockey skates were placed before his urn. Former ice hockey teammates honored his memory by lining the church aisle with their jerseys and sticks as his ashes were brought inside.

== Major achievements ==
2010
1st National Amateur Road Race Championships
1st Antwerpse Havenpijl
