= Staf Scheirlinckx =

Belgian cyclist

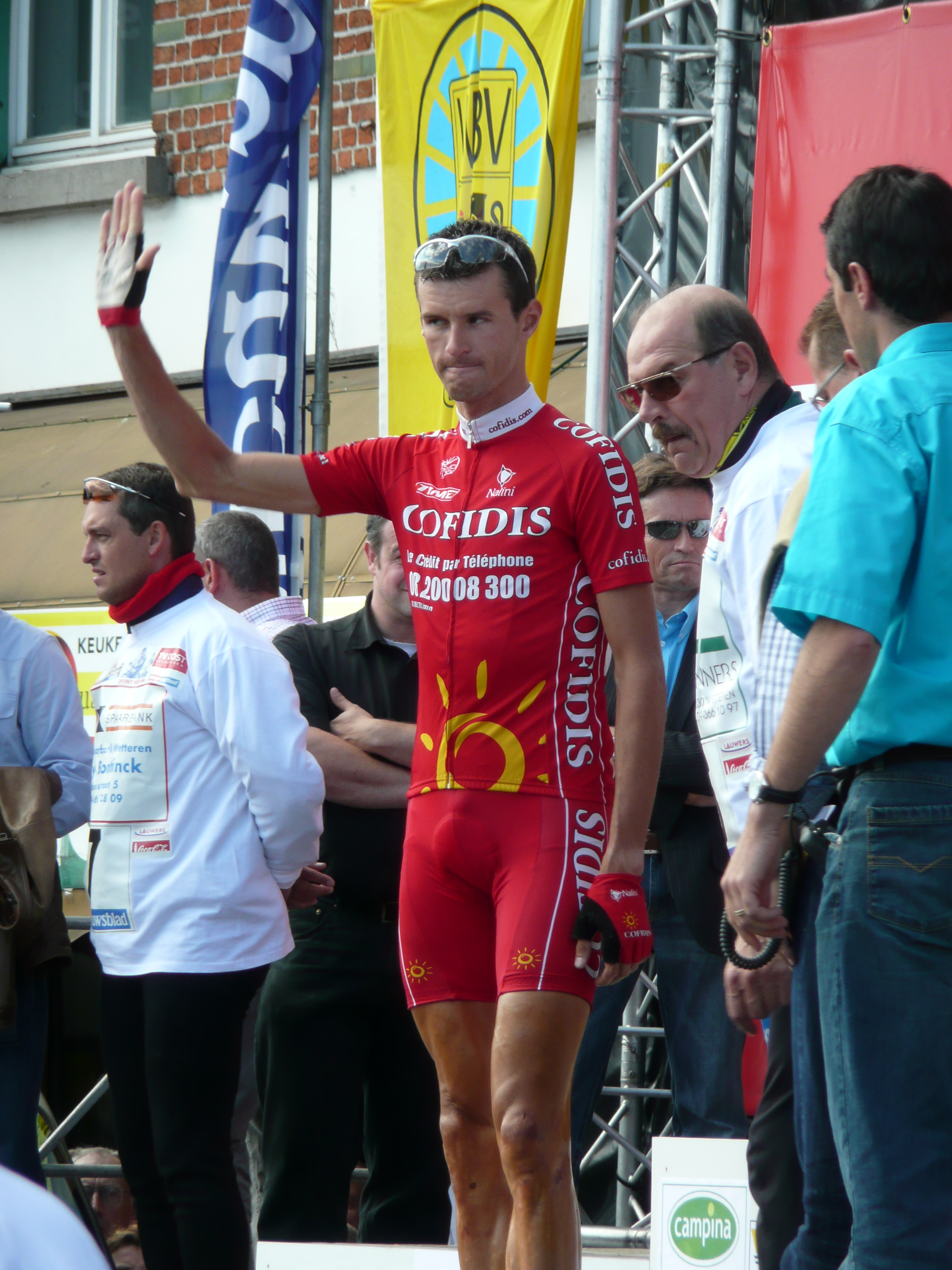
- Scheirlinckx at the 2007 Wetteren Dernyfestival.

Personal information
- Full name: Staf Scheirlinckx
- Born: 12 March 1979 (age 47) Herzele, Belgium
- Height: 1.93 m (6 ft 4 in)

Cycling career
- Sport: Cycling
- Current team: Retired
- Discipline: Road
- Role: Domestique

Professional teams
- 2000: Collstrop–De Federale Verzekeringen
- 2001–2002: Collstrop–Palmans
- 2003: Flanders–iTeamNova
- 2004–2008: Cofidis
- 2009–2010: Silence–Lotto
- 2011–2013: Veranda's Willems–Accent

Staf Scheirlinckx (born 12 March 1979 in Herzele) is a Belgian former professional road bicycle racer. His brother, Bert Scheirlinckx, is also a professional cyclist.

Scheirlinckx was one of the tallest riders in the professional peloton at 1.93 m (6 ft 4 in), and was known primarily as a domestique, particularly strong in the northern classic cycle races. Scheirlinckx retired at the end of the 2013 season, after fourteen years as a professional.

== Major results ==
1999
6th Memorial Van Coningsloo
2001
2nd Overall Tour de la Somme

1st Stage 1

2003
2nd Giro d'Oro
4th Overall Étoile de Bessèges
5th GP S.A.T.S.
7th Casalincontrada-Block Haus
7th Nationale Sluitingsprijs
2004
4th Overall Étoile de Bessèges
9th Tour du Doubs
2005
5th Paris–Bourges
2006
10th Paris–Roubaix
2007
3rd Grand Prix d'Ouverture La Marseillaise
5th Le Samyn
2008
8th Le Samyn
10th E3 Prijs Vlaanderen
2010
5th Grand Prix Cycliste de Québec
5th Coppa Sabatini
2011
8th Tour of Flanders
2012
10th Omloop Het Nieuwsblad
