= Kevin Van Hoovels =

Belgian cyclist

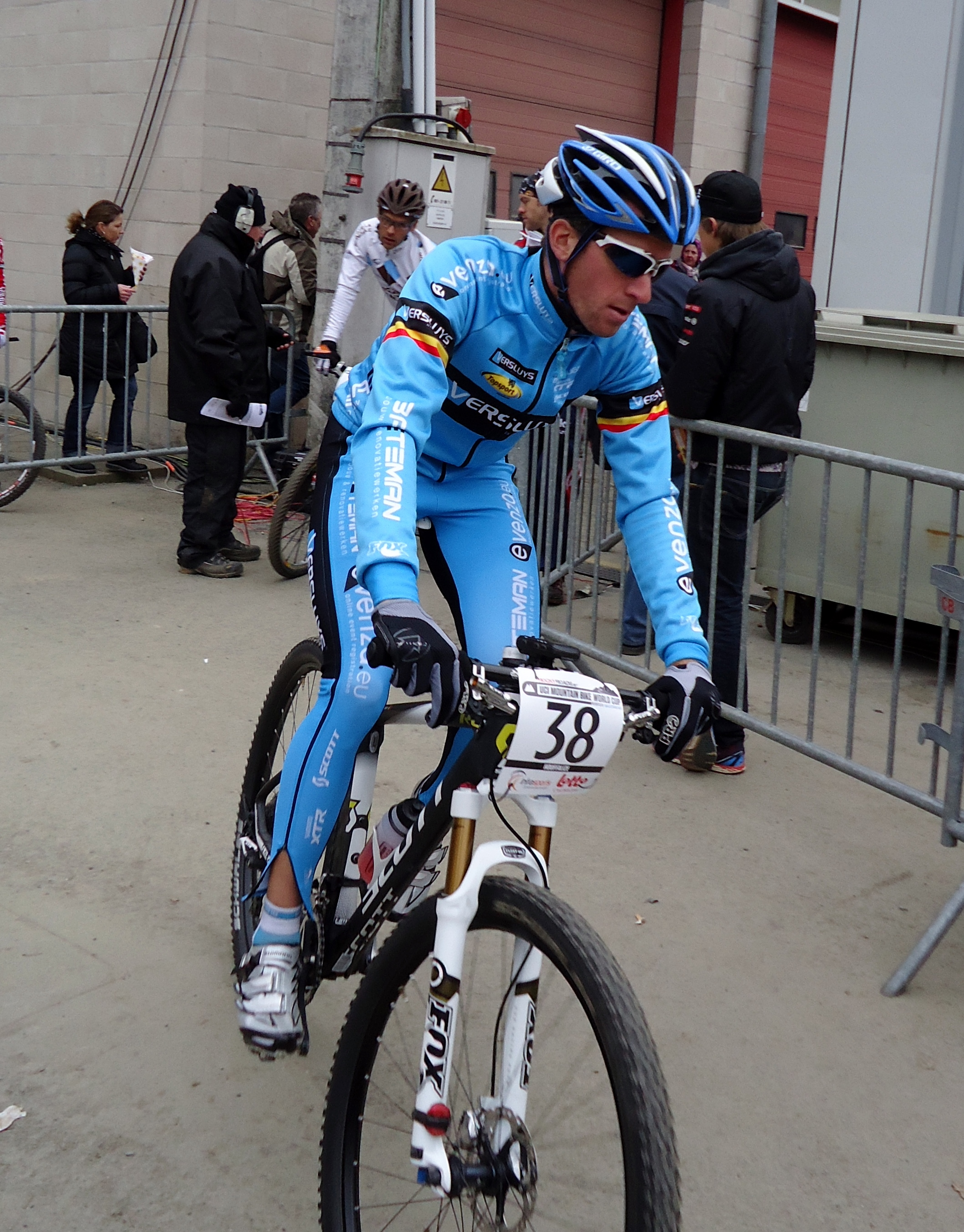
- Van Hoovels in 2012

Personal information
- Full name: Kevin Van Hoovels
- Born: 31 July 1985 (age 41) Bonheiden, Belgium

Cycling career
- Sport: Cycling
- Current team: Retired
- Disciplines: Road; Mountain bike
- Role: Rider

Amateur teams
- 2005: Bodysol–Win for Life–Jong Vlaanderen
- 2010–2016: Lingier–Versluys (MTB)

Professional teams
- 2012–2013: Bofrost–Steria
- 2014: Team3M

Kevin Van Hoovels (born 31 July 1985) is a Belgian cross-country mountain biker. At the 2012 Summer Olympics, he competed in the Men's cross-country at Hadleigh Farm, finishing in 19th place.

For the 2014 season, Van Hoovels competed in road racing for Team3M, and in mountain biking for the Versluys team.
