= David Kemp (cyclist) =

Australian cyclist (born 1984)

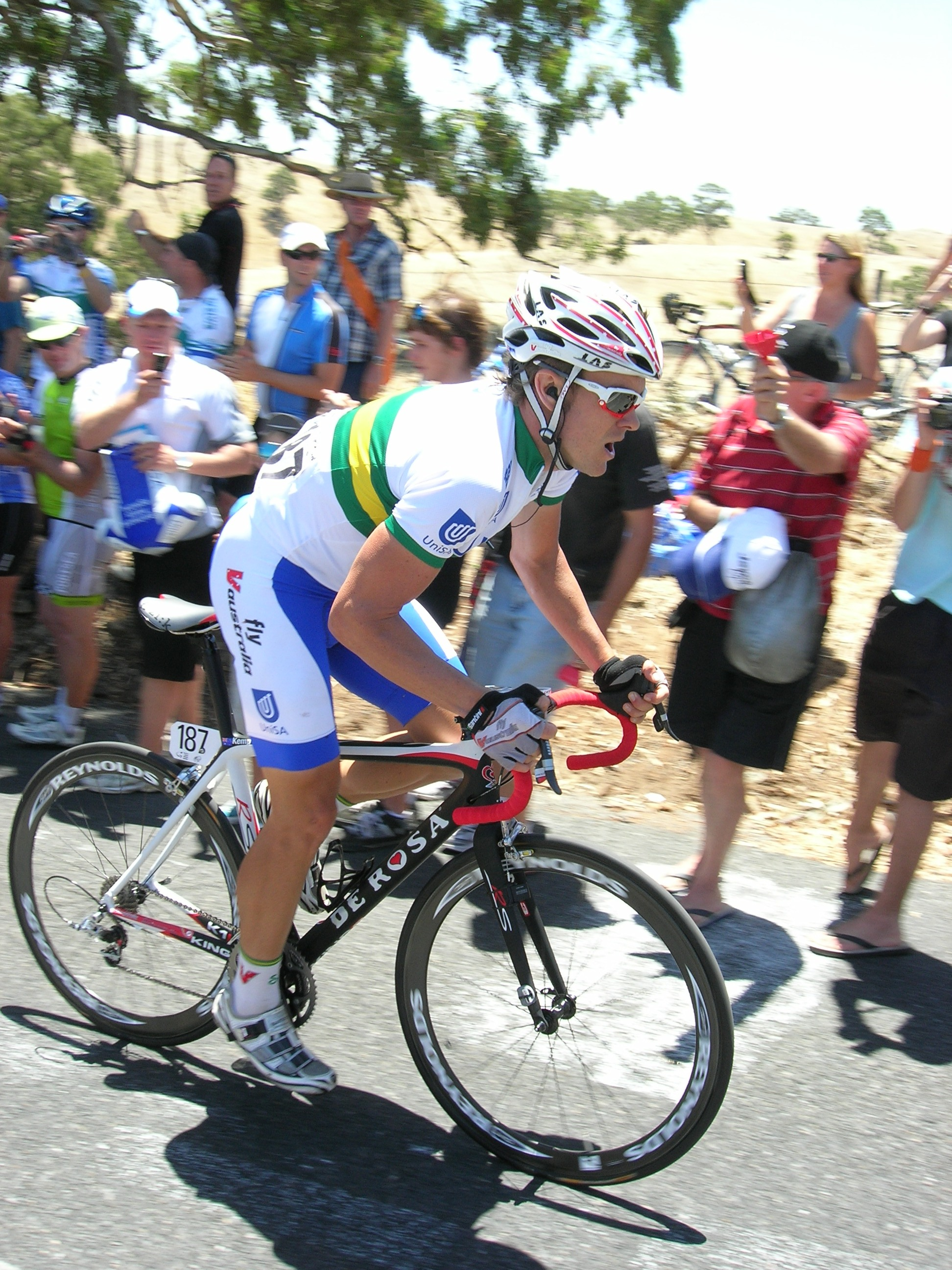
- Kemp (riding for UniSA), alone at the front of the race, climbs Checker Hill during Stage 2 of the 2010 Tour Down Under

Personal information
- Born: 10 April 1984 (age 42) Toowoomba, Queensland, Australia
- Height: 5 ft 11 in (180 cm)
- Weight: 153 lb (69 kg)

Cycling career
- Sport: Cycling
- Discipline: Road
- Role: Rider
- Rider type: All-rounder

Amateur teams
- Toowoomba Cycling Club
- Queensland Academy of Sport

Professional teams
- 2009–2010: Fly V Australia
- 2011: Veranda's Willems-Accent

Major wins
- 2006 Australian Cycling Grand Prix; Tour des Pyrenees, stage 1

David Kemp (born 10 April 1984) is an Australian former professional road bicycle racer who competed with the Belgian Veranda's Willems-Accent professional team in 2011, his final season. Kemp secured the contract at the last-minute, after the collapse of Chris White's ill-fated Pegasus Racing/Fly V project.

During his multi-year tenure with the Fly V Australia team, Kemp worked primarily as a domestique, though he won silver at the Australian road championships in January 2010 and finished third overall in the King of the Mountain classification at the Tour Down Under that same year.

== Major results ==
2006

- 1st Australian Cycling Grand Prix

2008

- 1st Stage 1 – Tour of the Murray River
- 1st Stage 2 – Tour of the Murray River
- 1st Stage 3 – Tour of Gippsland
- 1st Victorian Criterium Championships
- 2nd Overall Tour of the Murray River
- 2nd Metropolitan Championships Victoria
- 2nd stage 1 – Tour of Perth (National Road Series Australia)
- 2nd Stage 2 – Tour of Mersey Valley (National Road Series Australia)
- 3rd Overall – Tour of Perth (National Road Series Australia)
- 3rd Overall – Tour of Mersey Valley (National Road Series Australia)
- 3rd ITT – Tour of Mersey Valley (National Road Series Australia)
- 4th ITT – Tour of Perth (National Road Series Australia)
- 4th stage 3 – Tour of Mersey Valley (National Road Series Australia)

2009

- 1st Stage 2 – Tour of the Murray River
- 2nd Stage 2 – Tour of Gippsland
- 2nd Stage 6 – Tour of Gippsland
- 2nd overall – Tour of Gippsland
- 2nd overall Tour of Geelong
- 2nd Stage 1 Tour de Murrieta USA
- 3rd Boulevard Road Race USA
- 3rd Stage 2 Tour of Geelong
- 3rd Stage 4 Tour of Geelong (VIC ITT Champs)
- 3rd Stage 5 Tour of Atlanta USA
- 7th overall Tour de Murrieta USA

2010

- 1st Tour of Taihu Lake China, UCI 1.2
- 2nd Australian National Road Race Championships
- Member of the UniSA Aus National Team at the Tour Down Under
- Most aggressive rider stage 2 Tour Down Under
- 3rd overall King of the Mountain Classification – Tour Down Under
- 2nd Redlands Classic, USA
- 3rd Lake Front Classic, USA
