= Urbano–Vulsteke Cycling Team =

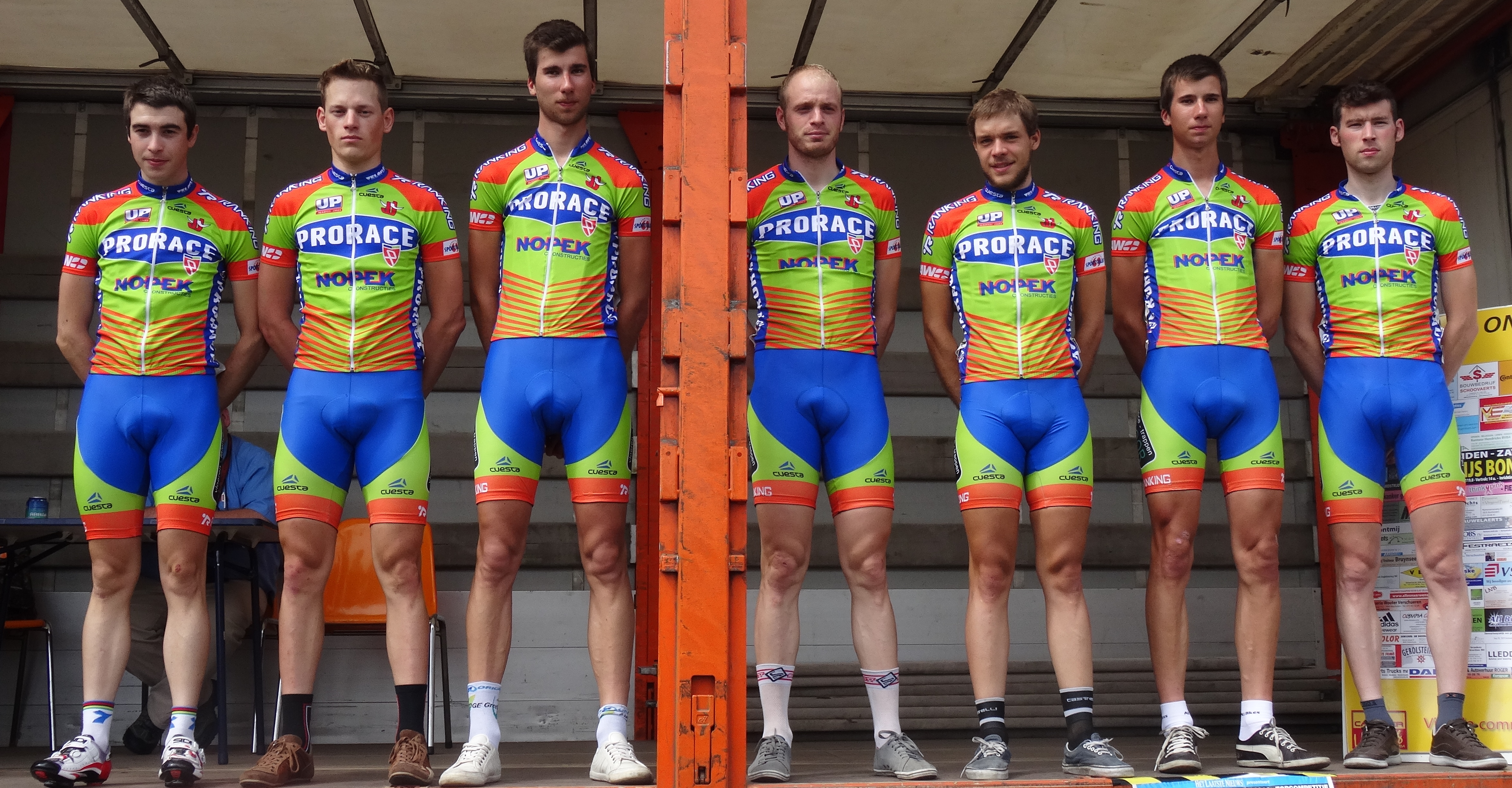
- The team in 2014

Team information
- UCI code: CRP (2005); PZC (2006–2009)
- Registered: Belgium
- Founded: 2005
- Discipline: Road
- Status: UCI Continental (2005–2009); Club (2010–)

Key personnel
- General manager: Benny Willems
- Team manager: Pascal Bellemans

Team name history
- 2005 2006–2007 2008–2009 2010 2011 2012–2014 2015–2018 2019 2020–2021 2022–: Profel Cycling Team; Profel Ziegler Continental Team; Profel Continental Team; Profel–Colossi; Profel–Bofrost–Prorace; Bofrost–Prorace; Prorace Cycling Team; Prorace–Urbano Cycling Team; Urbano Cycling Team; Urbano–Vulsteke Cycling Team
Urbano–Vulsteke Cycling Team jersey
Jersey

Urbano–Vulsteke Cycling Team is a Belgian road cycling team founded in 2005. The team held UCI Continental status from 2005 to 2009 under the sponsor Profel, before moving down to club status, which it has held since.

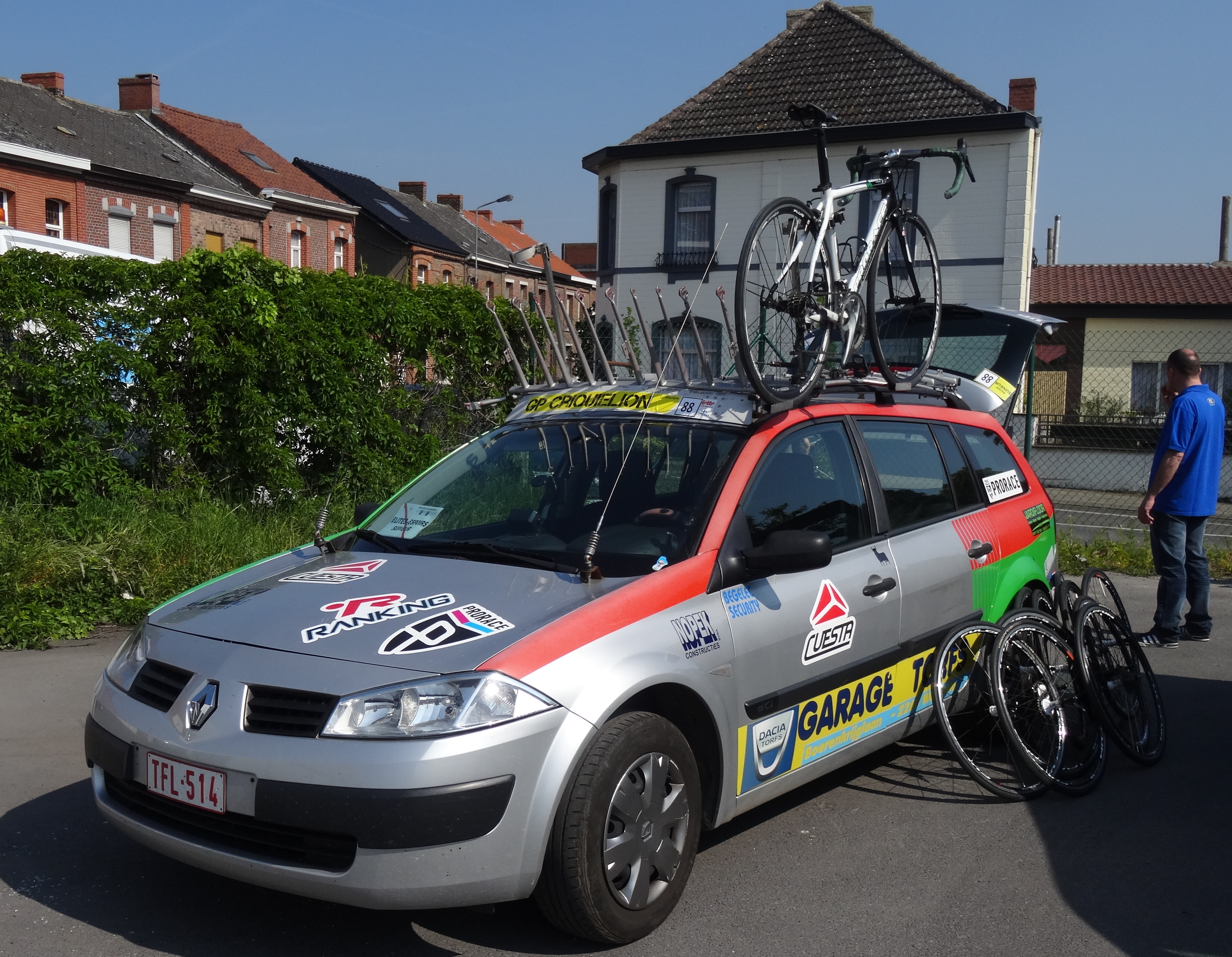
A team car in 2014

== Major wins ==
2005
Beverbeek Classic, Jarno Van Mingeroet
2006
Chrono Champenois, Matti Helminen
2009
Omloop Het Nieuwsblad U23, Laurens De Vreese
