= List of wins by Quick-Step–Davitamon and its successors =

This is a comprehensive list of victories of the Soudal–Quick-Step cycling team. The races are categorized according to the UCI Continental Circuits rules.

== 2003 – Quick-Step–Davitamon ==
Antwerpen na-tour Dernyspektakel, Johan Museeuw
Criterium Bavikhoeve, Paolo Bettini
Acht van Chaam, Servais Knaven
Profronde van Heerlen, Servais Knaven
Mijl van Mares, Servais Knaven
Stage 5 Tour of Qatar, Servais Knaven
Overall Tour Méditerranéen, Paolo Bettini
Omloop Het Nieuwsblad, Johan Museeuw
Milan–San Remo, Paolo Bettini
Stage 3 Tour de Romandie, Laurent Dufaux
Stage 1 Tour de Picardie, Aurelien Clerc
Overall Tour de Belgique, Michael Rogers

Stage 3, Tom Boonen

Overall Deutschland Tour, Michael Rogers

Stage 6, Michael Rogers

Overall Route du Sud, Michael Rogers

Stage 3, Michael Rogers

Italy Road Race Championship, Paolo Bettini
Hungary Road Race Championship, László Bodrogi
Stage 7 Tour de France, Richard Virenque
Stage 17 Tour de France, Servais Knaven
Vattenfall Cyclassics, Paolo Bettini
GP Stad Kortrijk, Frank Vandenbroucke
Clásica de San Sebastián, Paolo Bettini
Stage 3 Tour of Denmark, Johan Museeuw
G.P. Beghelli, Luca Paolini
World Time Trial Championships, Michael Rogers
Nationale Sluitingprijs — Putte-Kapellen, Nick Nuyens

== 2004 – Quick-Step–Davitamon ==
Stage 2 Tour of Qatar, Tom Boonen
Stage 2 Tour Méditerranéen, Paolo Bettini
Stage 1 Vuelta a Andalucía, Tom Boonen
Stage 2 Paris–Nice, Pedro Horrillo
Overall Tirreno–Adriatico, Paolo Bettini

Stage 4 & 6, Paolo Bettini

E3 Prijs Vlaanderen, Tom Boonen
Brabantse Pijl, Luca Paolini
Stage 4 Three Days of De Panne, László Bodrogi
Gent–Wevelgem, Tom Boonen
Scheldeprijs Vlaanderen, Tom Boonen
Stage 3 Giro del Trentino, Juan Miguel Mercado
Overall Tour de Picardie, Tom Boonen

Stage 1 & 2, Tom Boonen

Stage 2 Tour of Belgium, Tom Boonen
Overall Deutschland Tour, Patrik Sinkewitz

Stage 2 & 7, Tom Boonen
Stage 3, Patrik Sinkewitz

Stage 8 Tour de Suisse, Paolo Bettini
Overall Ster Elektrotoer, Nick Nuyens

Prologue & Stage 1, Tom Boonen
Stage 3, Nick Nuyens

Hungary Time Trial Championships, László Bodrogi
Stage 6 & 20 Tour de France, Tom Boonen
Stage 10 Tour de France, Richard Virenque
Stage 18 Tour de France, Juan Miguel Mercado
Stage 1 UNIQA Classic, Pedro Horrillo
Gran Premio Città di Camaiore, Paolo Bettini
Stage 4 Vuelta a Burgos, Aurélien Clerc
(gold) Olympic Games, Road Race, Paolo Bettini
Stage 1 Tour of Britain, Stefano Zanini
Stage 3 Tour of Britain, Tom Boonen
Memorial Rik Van Steenbergen, Tom Boonen
Paris–Brussels, Nick Nuyens
Grand Prix de Wallonie, Nick Nuyens
Gran Premio Industria e Commercio di Prato, Nick Nuyens
Stage 1 Circuit Franco-Belge, Paolo Bettini
Stage 3 & 4 Circuit Franco-Belge, Tom Boonen
World Time Trial Championships, Michael Rogers
Japan Cup, Patrik Sinkewitz

== 2005 – Quick-Step–Innergetic ==
Stage 1 & 2 Tour of Qatar, Tom Boonen
Omloop Het Volk, Nick Nuyens
Gran Premio di Lugano, Rik Verbrugghe
Stage 1 & 2 Paris–Nice, Tom Boonen
Stage 5 Tirreno Adriatico, Servais Knaven
E3 Prijs Vlaanderen, Tom Boonen
Tour of Flanders, Tom Boonen
Paris–Roubaix, Tom Boonen
Stage 1 Giro d'Italia, Paolo Bettini
Stage 2 Tour de Picardie, Tom Boonen
Overall Tour of Belgium, Tom Boonen

Stage 1 & 2, Tom Boonen

Stage 2 & 3 Tour de France, Tom Boonen
Overall Tour of Austria, Juan Miguel Mercado

Stage 2, Juan Miguel Mercado

Stage 3 Tour de Wallonie, Luca Paolini
Vattenfall Cyclassics, Filippo Pozzato
Prologue Eneco Tour, Rik Verbrugghe
Giro del Lazio, Filippo Pozzato
Stage 1 Tour de l'Ain, Cristian Moreni
Stage 1 Deutschland Tour, Bram Tankink
Stage 2 Deutschland Tour, Filippo Pozzato
Overall Tour of Britain, Nick Nuyens

Stage 1 & 5, Nick Nuyens
Stage 3 & 6, Luca Paolini

Stage 16 Vuelta a España, Paolo Bettini
Grand Prix de Wallonie, Nick Nuyens
World Time Trial Championships, Michael Rogers
World Road Race Championships, Tom Boonen
Züri-Metzgete, Paolo Bettini
Giro di Lombardia, Paolo Bettini

== 2006 – Quick-Step–Innergetic ==
Doha GP, Tom Boonen
Overall Tour of Qatar, Tom Boonen

Stage 1, 2, 3 & 5, Tom Boonen

Trofeo Soller, Paolo Bettini
Stage 5 Vuelta a Andalucía, Tom Boonen
Gran Premio di Chiasso, Remmert Wielinga
Gran Premio di Lugano, Paolo Bettini
Kuurne–Brussels–Kuurne, Nick Nuyens
Stage 1 Driedaagse van West-Vlaanderen, Francesco Chicchi
Stage 1, 2 & 4 Paris–Nice, Tom Boonen
Stage 1 & 2 Tirreno–Adriatico, Paolo Bettini
Milan–San Remo, Filippo Pozzato
E3 Prijs Vlaanderen, Tom Boonen
Stage 3 Three Days of the Panne, Steven de Jongh
Tour of Flanders, Tom Boonen
Scheldeprijs Vlaanderen, Tom Boonen
Stage 1 Four Days of Dunkirk, Francesco Chicchi
Stage 15 Giro d'Italia, Paolo Bettini
Stage 19 Giro d'Italia, Juan Manuel Gárate
Stage 2 & 3b Tour of Belgium, Tom Boonen
Veenendaal–Veenendaal, Tom Boonen
Stage 1 Tour de Suisse, Tom Boonen
Stage 3 Tour de Suisse, Nick Nuyens
Italy Road Race Championship, Paolo Bettini
Stage 18 Tour de France, Matteo Tosatto
Stage 1, 3 & 5 Eneco Tour, Tom Boonen
Stage 2 Vuelta a España, Paolo Bettini
Stage 3 Tour of Britain, Filippo Pozzato
Stage 5 Tour of Britain, Francesco Chicchi
Stage 6 Tour of Britain, Tom Boonen
Grand Prix d'Isbergues, Cédric Vasseur
Delta Profronde, Steven de Jongh
World Road Race Championships, Paolo Bettini
Overall Circuit Franco-Belge, Kevin Van Impe

Stage 1, Kevin Van Impe

Giro di Lombardia, Paolo Bettini

== 2007 – Quick-Step–Innergetic ==
Overall Tour of Qatar, Wilfried Cretskens

Stage 1 Team Time Trial
Stage 2, 3, 4 & 6, Tom Boonen

Stage 4 Vuelta a Andalucía, Tom Boonen
Stage 1 Volta ao Algarve, Gert Steegmans
Stage 4 Tour of California, Paolo Bettini
Kuurne–Brussels–Kuurne, Tom Boonen
Stage 3 Driedaagse van West-Vlaanderen, Wouter Weylandt
Ronde van het Groene Hart, Wouter Weylandt
Dwars door Vlaanderen, Tom Boonen
E3 Prijs Vlaanderen, Tom Boonen
Stage 3 Driedaagse van De Panne, Gert Steegmans
Stage 4 Four Days of Dunkirk, Gert Steegmans
Stage 1 Tour of Belgium, Wouter Weylandt
Stage 5 Tour of Belgium, Tom Boonen
Stage 2 Tour de Suisse, Alessandro Proni
Stage 1 Ster Elektrotoer, Wouter Weylandt
Italy Road Race Championship, Giovanni Visconti
Points classification, Tour de France, Tom Boonen

Stage 2, Gert Steegmans
Stage 6 & 12, Tom Boonen
Stage 10, Cédric Vasseur

Stage 2a Brixia Tour, Giovanni Visconti
Clásica de San Sebastián, Juan Manuel Gárate
Stage 4 Eneco Tour, Wouter Weylandt
Stage 7 Eneco Tour, Sébastien Rosseler
Grote Prijs Jef Scherens, Bram Tankink
Stage 3 Vuelta a España, Paolo Bettini
Tour de Rijke, Gert Steegmans
Omloop van het Houtland, Steven de Jongh
World Road Race Championships, Paolo Bettini
Omloop van de Vlaamse Scheldeboorden, Steven de Jongh
Overall Circuit Franco-Belge, Gert Steegmans

Stage 2 & 4, Gert Steegmans

Coppa Sabatini, Giovanni Visconti

== 2008 – Quick-Step ==
Overall Tour of Qatar, Tom Boonen

Team Time Trial
Stage 2, 3 & 6, Tom Boonen

Trofeo Calvià, Gert Steegmans
Stage 3 Vuelta a Andalucía, Giovanni Visconti
Stage 2 Tour of California, Tom Boonen
Overall Volta ao Algarve, Stijn Devolder

Stage 4, Stijn Devolder

Kuurne–Brussels–Kuurne, Steven de Jongh
Stage 1 & 2 Paris–Nice, Gert Steegmans
Nokere Koerse, Wouter Weylandt
Tour of Flanders, Stijn Devolder
Paris–Roubaix, Tom Boonen
Stage 2 Four Days of Dunkirk, Gert Steegmans
Profronde van Fryslan, Gert Steegmans
Overall Tour of Belgium, Stijn Devolder

Stage 4, Stijn Devolder
Stage 5, Tom Boonen

Stage 4 Ster Elektrotoer, Tom Boonen
Halle–Ingooigem, Gert Steegmans
Stage 1 Tour of Austria, Paolo Bettini
Stage 7 Tour of Austria, Tom Boonen
Trofeo Matteotti, Paolo Bettini
Stage 21 Tour de France, Gert Steegmans
Stage 1 Tour de Wallonie, Tom Boonen
Stage 2 Tour de Wallonie, Paolo Bettini
Belgium Time Trial Championship, Stijn Devolder
Stage 1 & 4 Eneco Tour, Tom Boonen
Tour de Rijke, Steven de Jongh
Stage 3 & 16 Vuelta a España, Tom Boonen
Stage 6 & 12 Vuelta a España, Paolo Bettini
Stage 17 Vuelta a España, Wouter Weylandt
Memorial Rik Van Steenbergen, Gert Steegmans
Grand Prix de Fourmies, Giovanni Visconti
Stage 2 Tour de Pologne, Allan Davis
Omloop van de Vlaamse Scheldeboorden, Wouter Weylandt
Stage 1 Circuit Franco-Belge, Tom Boonen
Stage 4 Circuit Franco-Belge, Sébastien Rosseler

== 2009 – Quick-Step ==
Overall Tour Down Under, Allan Davis

Stage 2, 4 & 5, Allan Davis

Overall Tour of Qatar, Tom Boonen

Stage 3, Tom Boonen

Kuurne–Brussels–Kuurne, Tom Boonen
Le Samyn, Wouter Weylandt
Stage 3 Driedaagse van West-Vlaanderen, Wouter Weylandt
Stage 3 Paris–Nice, Sylvain Chavanel
Dwars door Vlaanderen, Kevin Van Impe
Tour of Flanders, Stijn Devolder
Paris–Roubaix, Tom Boonen
Stage 4 Four Days of Dunkirk, Sébastien Rosseler
Giro d'Italia, Youth classification, Kevin Seeldraeyers
Stage 5 Tour of Belgium, Sébastien Rosseler
Halle–Ingooigem, Jurgen Van De Walle
Belarus Time Trial Championship, Branislau Samoilau
Belgium Road Race Championship, Tom Boonen
Stage 5 Tour of Austria, Dries Devenyns
Prologue Eneco Tour, Sylvain Chavanel
Stage 3 Eneco Tour, Tom Boonen
Kampioenschap van Vlaanderen, Steven de Jongh
Stage 3 Circuit Franco-Belge, Tom Boonen

== 2010 – Quick-Step ==
Stage 3 & 5 Tour of Qatar, Tom Boonen
Stage 5 Tour of Oman, Tom Boonen
Stage 2 Tirreno–Adriatico, Tom Boonen
Stage 5 Volta a Catalunya, Davide Malacarne
Stage 3 Giro d'Italia, Wouter Weylandt
Stage 5 Giro d'Italia, Jérôme Pineau
Overall Tour of Belgium, Stijn Devolder
Halle–Ingooigem, Jurgen Van De Walle
Stage 2 & 7 Tour de France, Sylvain Chavanel
Belarus Time Trial Championships, Branislau Samoilau
Belgium Road Race Championships, Stijn Devolder
Belgium Time Trial Championships, Stijn Devolder
Gran Premio Bruno Beghelli, Dario Cataldo

== 2011 – Quick-Step ==
Cyclo-cross World Championships, Zdeněk Štybar
Stage 2 Tour of Qatar, Tom Boonen
Nokere Koerse, Gert Steegmans
Gent–Wevelgem, Tom Boonen
France Road Race Championships, Sylvain Chavanel
Curaçao Road Race Championships, Marc de Maar
Curaçao Time Trial Championships, Marc de Maar

== 2012 – Omega Pharma–Quick-Step ==
Czech Republic Cyclocross Championships, Zdeněk Štybar
Overall Tour de San Luis, Levi Leipheimer

Stages 1 & 2, Francesco Chicchi
Stages 3 (Note: Retroactively awarded after Alberto Contador's results were disqualified following his backdated two-year ban in February 2012.) & 4, Levi Leipheimer
Stage 7, Tom Boonen

Overall Tour of Qatar, Tom Boonen

Stages 1 & 4, Tom Boonen

Trofeo Palma, Andrew Fenn
Trofeo Migjorn, Andrew Fenn
Stage 4 Volta ao Algarve, Gerald Ciolek
Overall Tour of Oman, Peter Velits
Overall Driedaagse van West-Vlaanderen, Julien Vermote

Prologue, Michał Kwiatkowski
Stage 1, Francesco Chicchi

Stage 2 Paris–Nice, Tom Boonen
Nokere Koerse, Francesco Chicchi
Handzame Classic, Francesco Chicchi
Dwars door Vlaanderen, Niki Terpstra
E3 Harelbeke, Tom Boonen
Gent–Wevelgem, Tom Boonen
Overall Three Days of De Panne, Sylvain Chavanel

Stage 3b (ITT), Sylvain Chavanel

Tour of Flanders, Tom Boonen
Paris–Roubaix, Tom Boonen
Stage 7 Tour of Turkey, Iljo Keisse
Stage 4 Four Days of Dunkirk, Zdeněk Štybar
Overall Tour of Belgium, Tony Martin

Stage 4 (ITT), Tony Martin

France Time Trial Championships, Sylvain Chavanel
Germany Time Trial Championships, Tony Martin
Slovakia Time Trial Championships, Peter Velits
Italy Time Trial Championships, Dario Cataldo
Belgium Time Trial Championships, Kristof Vandewalle
Belgium Road Race Championships, Tom Boonen
Ireland Road Race Championships, Matt Brammeier
Netherlands Road Race Championships, Niki Terpstra
Poland Road Race Championships, Michał Gołaś
Stage 3 Tour de Pologne, Zdeněk Štybar
Stage 2b Tour de l'Ain, Team Time Trial
Stage 6 Tour of Utah, Levi Leipheimer
Overall World Ports Classic, Tom Boonen

Stage 1, Tom Boonen

Stage 16 Vuelta a España, Dario Cataldo
Paris–Brussels, Tom Boonen
World Team Time Trial Championships
World Time Trial Championships, Tony Martin
Overall Tour of Beijing, Tony Martin

Stage 2, Tony Martin

Chrono des Nations, Tony Martin
Amstel Curaçao Race, Niki Terpstra

== 2013 – Omega Pharma–Quick-Step ==
Czech Republic Cyclocross Championships, Zdeněk Štybar
Stage 1 Tour de San Luis, Mark Cavendish
Overall Tour of Qatar, Mark Cavendish

Stages 3, 4, 5 & 6, Mark Cavendish

Overall Volta ao Algarve, Tony Martin

Stage 4 (ITT), Tony Martin

Overall Driedaagse van West-Vlaanderen, Kristof Vandewalle

Prologue, Kristof Vandewalle

Stage 1 Tirreno–Adriatico, Team Time Trial
Stage 6 Paris–Nice, Sylvain Chavanel
Stage 7 (ITT) Tirreno–Adriatico, Tony Martin
Stages 1 & 2 Volta a Catalunya, Gianni Meersman
Overall Three Days of De Panne, Sylvain Chavanel

Stage 2, Mark Cavendish
Stage 3b (ITT), Sylvain Chavanel

Stage 6 (ITT) Tour of the Basque Country, Tony Martin
Stages 1 & 3 Tour de Romandie, Gianni Meersman
Stage 5 (ITT) Tour de Romandie, Tony Martin
Stages 1, 6, 12, 13 & 21 Giro d'Italia, Mark Cavendish
Points classification in the Giro d'Italia, Mark Cavendish
Overall Tour of Belgium, Tony Martin

Stage 3 (ITT), Tony Martin

Stage 4 (ITT) Critérium du Dauphiné, Tony Martin
France Time Trial Championships, Sylvain Chavanel
Germany Time Trial Championships, Tony Martin
Slovakia Time Trial Championships, Peter Velits
Poland Road Race Championships, Michał Kwiatkowski
United Kingdom Road Race Championships, Mark Cavendish
Stages 5 & 13 Tour de France, Mark Cavendish
Stage 11 (ITT) Tour de France, Tony Martin
Stage 14 Tour de France, Matteo Trentin
Stage 2 Tour de Wallonie, Tom Boonen
Stage 6 Danmark Rundt, Mark Cavendish
Prologue Tour de l'Ain, Gianni Meersman
Belgium Time Trial Championships, Kristof Vandewalle
Overall Eneco Tour, Zdeněk Štybar

Stages 3 & 7, Zdeněk Štybar
Stage 5 (ITT), Sylvain Chavanel

Stage 7 Vuelta a España, Zdeněk Štybar
Overall World Ports Classic, Nikolas Maes
Stages 4, 7 & 8 Tour of Britain, Mark Cavendish
World Team Time Trial Championships
World Time Trial Championships, Tony Martin
Chrono des Nations, Tony Martin

== 2014 – Omega Pharma–Quick-Step ==
Rotterdam Six Days, Niki Terpstra & Iljo Keisse
Cyclo-cross World Championships, Zdeněk Štybar
Overall Tour of Qatar, Niki Terpstra

Stage 1, Niki Terpstra
Stages 2 & 4, Tom Boonen

Trofeo Serra de Tramuntana, Michał Kwiatkowski
Trofeo Muro-Port d'Alcúdia, Gianni Meersman
Overall Volta ao Algarve, Michał Kwiatkowski

Stages 2 & 3 (ITT), Michał Kwiatkowski
Stage 5, Mark Cavendish

Kuurne–Brussels–Kuurne, Tom Boonen
Strade Bianche, Michał Kwiatkowski
Stage 2 Driedaagse van West-Vlaanderen, Guillaume Van Keirsbulck
Stage 1 Tirreno–Adriatico, Team time trial
Stage 6 Tirreno–Adriatico, Mark Cavendish
Dwars door Vlaanderen, Niki Terpstra
Overall Three Days of De Panne, Guillaume Van Keirsbulck
Stages 2 & 6 (ITT) Tour of the Basque Country, Tony Martin
Stage 4 Tour of the Basque Country, Wout Poels
Grand Prix Pino Cerami, Alessandro Petacchi
Paris–Roubaix, Niki Terpstra
Stages 1, 2, 4 & 8 Tour of Turkey, Mark Cavendish
Prologue (ITT) Tour de Romandie, Michał Kwiatkowski
Stages 1 & 8 Tour of California, Mark Cavendish
Stage 12 (ITT) Giro d'Italia, Rigoberto Urán
Overall Tour of Belgium, Tony Martin

Stages 1 & 2, Tom Boonen
Stage 3 (ITT), Tony Martin

Stage 6 Critérium du Dauphiné, Jan Bakelants
Stages 1 (ITT) & 7 (ITT) Tour de Suisse, Tony Martin
Stage 4 Tour de Suisse, Mark Cavendish
Stage 6 Tour de Suisse, Matteo Trentin
Poland Time Trial Championships, Michał Kwiatkowski
Germany Time Trial Championships, Tony Martin
Czech Republic Road Race Championships, Zdeněk Štybar
World University Cycling Championship Road Race, Petr Vakoč
World University Cycling Championship Time Trial, Petr Vakoč
Stages 7 Tour de France, Matteo Trentin
Stages 9 & 20 (ITT) Tour de France, Tony Martin
Overall Tour de Wallonie, Gianni Meersman

Stage 5, Gianni Meersman

Stage 2 Tour de Pologne, Petr Vakoč
Stage 2 Eneco Tour, Zdeněk Štybar
Stage 7 Eneco Tour, Guillaume Van Keirsbulck
Prologue & Stage 2 Tour de l'Ain, Gianni Meersman
Stage 4 Tour de l'Ain, Julian Alaphilippe
Châteauroux Classic, Iljo Keisse
Stages 1 & 2 Tour du Poitou-Charentes, Mark Cavendish
Stage 10 (ITT) Vuelta a España, Tony Martin
Stage 2 Tour of Britain, Mark Renshaw
Stage 4 Tour of Britain, Michał Kwiatkowski
Stage 7 Tour of Britain, Julien Vermote
GP Briek Schotte, Andrew Fenn
World Road Race Championships, Michał Kwiatkowski
Binche–Chimay–Binche, Zdeněk Štybar
Amstel Curaçao Race, Niki Terpstra

== 2015 – Etixx–Quick-Step ==
Rotterdam Six Days, Niki Terpstra & Iljo Keisse
Stage 7 Tour de San Luis, Mark Cavendish
Cadel Evans Great Ocean Road Race, Gianni Meersman
Overall Dubai Tour, Mark Cavendish

Stages 1 & 4, Mark Cavendish

Colombia Time Trial Championships, Rigoberto Urán
Overall Tour of Qatar, Niki Terpstra

Stage 3 (ITT), Niki Terpstra

Clásica de Almería, Mark Cavendish
Stage 1 Volta ao Algarve, Gianni Meersman
Stage 3 (ITT) Volta ao Algarve, Tony Martin
Kuurne–Brussels–Kuurne, Mark Cavendish
Strade Bianche, Zdeněk Štybar
Overall Driedaagse van West-Vlaanderen, Yves Lampaert

Stage 1, Yves Lampaert

Prologue Paris–Nice, Michał Kwiatkowski
Handzame Classic, Gianni Meersman
Ronde van Zeeland Seaports, Iljo Keisse
Amstel Gold Race, Michał Kwiatkowski
Stages 1, 2 & 7 Presidential Cycling Tour of Turkey, Mark Cavendish
Stage 6 (ITT) Tour de Romandie, Tony Martin
Stages 1, 2, 5 & 8 Tour of California, Mark Cavendish
Stage 7 Tour of California, Julian Alaphilippe
Stage 1 Tour of Belgium, Tom Boonen
Stage 21 Giro d'Italia, Iljo Keisse
Rund um Köln, Tom Boonen
Germany Time Trial Championships, Tony Martin
Czech Republic Road Race Championships, Petr Vakoč
Netherlands Road Race Championships, Niki Terpstra
Stage 4 Tour de France, Tony Martin
Stage 6 Tour de France, Zdeněk Štybar
Stage 7 Tour de France, Mark Cavendish
Overall Tour de Wallonie, Niki Terpstra

Stage 1, Niki Terpstra

Stage 3 Eneco Tour, Tom Boonen
Overall Czech Cycling Tour, Petr Vakoč

Stage 1, Team time trial
Stage 2, Fernando Gaviria
Stage 4, Zdeněk Štybar

Overall Tour du Poitou-Charentes, Tony Martin

Stages 2 & 5, Matteo Trentin

Stage 2 Tour of Britain, Petr Vakoč
Stage 4 Tour of Britain, Fernando Gaviria
Stage 6 Tour of Britain, Matteo Trentin
Grand Prix Cycliste de Québec, Rigoberto Urán
Kampioenschap van Vlaanderen, Michał Gołaś
Münsterland Giro, Tom Boonen
Paris–Tours, Matteo Trentin

== 2016 – Etixx–Quick-Step ==
Stage 1 (TTT) Tour de San Luis
Stage 2 Tour de San Luis, Fernando Gaviria
Trofeo Pollenca-Port de Andratx, Gianluca Brambilla
Overall Dubai Tour, Marcel Kittel

Stages 1 & 4, Marcel Kittel

Stage 2 Volta a la Comunitat Valenciana, Dan Martin
Stage 5 Volta a la Comunitat Valenciana, Stijn Vandenbergh
Stage 1 Tour of Oman, Bob Jungels
Stages 1 & 4 Volta ao Algarve, Marcel Kittel
Stage 2, Davide Martinelli, Tour La Provence
Stage 3, Fernando Gaviria, Tour La Provence
Classic Sud-Ardèche, Petr Vakoč
La Drôme Classic, Petr Vakoč
Le Samyn, Niki Terpstra
Track Cycling World Championships – Omnium, Fernando Gaviria
Stage 2 Tirreno–Adriatico, Zdeněk Štybar
Stage 3 Tirreno–Adriatico, Fernando Gaviria
Stage 3 Volta a Catalunya, Dan Martin
Stage 3a Three Days of De Panne, Marcel Kittel
Scheldeprijs, Marcel Kittel
Brabantse Pijl, Petr Vakoč
Stage 1 Tour de Romandie, Marcel Kittel
Stages 2 & 3 Giro d'Italia, Marcel Kittel
Stage 8 Giro d'Italia, Gianluca Brambilla
Youth classification Giro d'Italia, Bob Jungels
Overall Tour of California, Julian Alaphilippe

Stage 3, Julian Alaphilippe

Stage 18 Giro d'Italia, Matteo Trentin
Stage 4 Tour de Suisse, Maximiliano Richeze
Germany Time Trial Championships, Tony Martin
Luxembourg Time Trial Championships, Bob Jungels
Luxembourg Road Race Championships, Bob Jungels
Stage 4 Tour de France, Marcel Kittel
Stage 1 Tour de Pologne, Davide Martinelli
Stages 2 & 4 Tour de Pologne, Fernando Gaviria
Stage 1 Tour de Wallonie, Tom Boonen
Stage 4 Tour de Wallonie, Matteo Trentin
London–Surrey Classic, Tom Boonen
Dwars door het Hageland, Niki Terpstra
Stage 1 Tour de l'Ain, Matteo Trentin
Stages 2 & 5 Vuelta a España, Gianni Meersman
Stage 9 Vuelta a España, David de la Cruz
Brussels Cycling Classic, Tom Boonen
Grand Prix de Fourmies, Marcel Kittel
Stage 15 Vuelta a España, Gianluca Brambilla
Stage 2 Tour of Britain, Julien Vermote
Stage 7a (ITT) Tour of Britain, Tony Martin
GP Impanis-Van Petegem, Fernando Gaviria
Textielprijs Vichte, Julien Vermote
Overall Eneco Tour, Niki Terpstra
UCI Road World Championships – Men's team time trial
Paris–Tours, Fernando Gaviria
UCI World Time Trial Championships, Tony Martin

== 2017 – Quick-Step Floors ==
New Zealand Time Trial Championships, Jack Bauer
Stages 1 & 4 Vuelta a San Juan, Fernando Gaviria
Stage 2 Vuelta a San Juan, Tom Boonen
Stages 6 & 7 Vuelta a San Juan, Maximiliano Richeze
Overall Dubai Tour, Marcel Kittel

Stages 1, 2 & 5

Stage 1 Volta ao Algarve, Fernando Gaviria
Stage 2 Volta ao Algarve, Dan Martin
Stage 2 Abu Dhabi Tour, Marcel Kittel
Stage 4 (ITT) Paris–Nice, Julian Alaphilippe
Stage 8 Paris–Nice, David de la Cruz
Stage 6 Tirreno–Adriatico, Fernando Gaviria
Dwars door Vlaanderen, Yves Lampaert
Overall Three Days of De Panne, Philippe Gilbert

Stage 1, Philippe Gilbert
Stage 3a, Marcel Kittel

Tour of Flanders, Philippe Gilbert
Scheldeprijs, Marcel Kittel
Stage 3 Tour of the Basque Country, David de la Cruz
Amstel Gold Race, Philippe Gilbert
Stages 3, 5, 12 & 13 Giro d'Italia, Fernando Gaviria
Stage 1 Tour of California, Marcel Kittel
Stage 15 Giro d'Italia, Bob Jungels
Youth classification Giro d'Italia, Bob Jungels
Points classification Giro d'Italia, Fernando Gaviria
Gullegem Koerse, Yves Lampaert
Stage 2 Tour de Suisse, Philippe Gilbert
Stage 4 Ster ZLM Toer, Marcel Kittel
Belgium Time Trial Championships, Yves Lampaert
Czech Republic Road Race Championships, Zdeněk Štybar
Luxembourg Road Race Championships, Bob Jungels
Stages 2, 6, 7, 10 & 11 Tour de France, Marcel Kittel
Stage 2 Vuelta a Burgos, Matteo Trentin
Stage 2 Vuelta a España, Yves Lampaert
Stages 4, 10, 13 & 21 Vuelta a España, Matteo Trentin
Stage 8 Vuelta a España, Julian Alaphilippe
Omloop Mandel-Leie-Schelde, Iljo Keisse
Stage 4 Tour of Britain, Fernando Gaviria
Kampioenschap van Vlaanderen, Fernando Gaviria
GP Impanis-Van Petegem, Matteo Trentin
Textielprijs Vichte, Iljo Keisse
Paris–Tours, Matteo Trentin
Stages 1, 2, 3 & 6 Tour of Guangxi, Fernando Gaviria

== 2018 – Quick-Step Floors ==
Stage 3 Tour Down Under, Elia Viviani
Stage 1 Vuelta a San Juan, Fernando Gaviria
Stage 4 Vuelta a San Juan, Maximiliano Richeze
Stages 1, 2 & 3 Colombia Oro y Paz, Fernando Gaviria
Overall Dubai Tour, Elia Viviani

Stages 2 & 5, Elia Viviani

Stage 4 Colombia Oro y Paz, Julian Alaphilippe
Stage 2 Abu Dhabi Tour, Elia Viviani
Le Samyn, Niki Terpstra
Dwars door West-Vlaanderen, Rémi Cavagna
Nokere Koerse, Fabio Jakobsen
Handzame Classic, Álvaro José Hodeg
Stage 1 Volta a Catalunya, Álvaro José Hodeg
Driedaagse De Panne-Koksijde, Elia Viviani
E3 Harelbeke, Niki Terpstra
Stage 6 Volta a Catalunya, Maximilian Schachmann
Dwars door Vlaanderen, Yves Lampaert
Tour of Flanders, Niki Terpstra
Stages 1 & 2 Tour of the Basque Country, Julian Alaphilippe
Scheldeprijs, Fabio Jakobsen
Stage 6 Tour of the Basque Country, Enric Mas
La Flèche Wallonne, Julian Alaphilippe
Liège–Bastogne–Liège, Bob Jungels
Points classification Giro d'Italia, Elia Viviani

Stages 2, 3, 13 & 17, Elia Viviani

Stages 1, 5 & 7 Tour of California, Fernando Gaviria
Stage 1 Tour des Fjords, Fabio Jakobsen
Stage 18 Giro d'Italia, Maximilian Schachmann
Hammer Series Limburg
Stage 4 Critérium du Dauphiné, Julian Alaphilippe
Stage 1 (TTT) Adriatica Ionica Race
Stages 2, 4 & 5 Adriatica Ionica Race, Elia Viviani
Belgium Road Race Championships, Yves Lampaert
Luxembourg Time Trial Championships, Bob Jungels
Italy Road Race Championships, Elia Viviani
Denmark Road Race Championships, Michael Mørkøv
Luxembourg Road Race Championships, Bob Jungels
Mountains classification Tour de France, Julian Alaphilippe

Stages 1 & 4, Fernando Gaviria
Stages 10 & 16, Julian Alaphilippe

Clásica de San Sebastián, Julian Alaphilippe
Stage 3 Tour de Pologne, Álvaro José Hodeg
Stage 1 BinckBank Tour, Fabio Jakobsen
EuroEyes Cyclassics, Elia Viviani
Stage 1 Deutschland Tour, Álvaro José Hodeg
Stage 2 Deutschland Tour, Maximilian Schachmann
Stages 3, 10 & 21 Vuelta a España, Elia Viviani
Stage 20 Vuelta a España, Enric Mas
Overall Tour of Britain, Julian Alaphilippe

Stage 3, Julian Alaphilippe

Overall Okolo Slovenska, Julian Alaphilippe

Prologue, Bob Jungels
Stage 1, Julian Alaphilippe
Stage 4, Fabio Jakobsen

Textielprijs Vichte, Florian Sénéchal
Grand Prix d'Isbergues, Philippe Gilbert
UCI Road World Championships – Men's team time trial
Stage 1 Tour of Turkey, Maximiliano Richeze
Stage 5 Tour of Turkey, Álvaro José Hodeg
Stages 3 & 6 Tour of Guangxi, Fabio Jakobsen
Six Days of Ghent, Iljo Keisse & Elia Viviani

== 2019 – Deceuninck–Quick-Step ==
Stage 1 Tour Down Under, Elia Viviani
Six Days of Bremen, Iljo Keisse
Cadel Evans Great Ocean Road Race, Elia Viviani
Stages 2 & 3 (ITT) Vuelta a San Juan, Julian Alaphilippe
Stage 2 Tour Colombia, Álvaro José Hodeg
Stage 4 Tour Colombia, Bob Jungels
Stage 5 Tour Colombia, Julian Alaphilippe
Stage 3 Tour La Provence, Philippe Gilbert
Stage 1 Volta ao Algarve, Fabio Jakobsen
Stage 5 Volta ao Algarve, Zdeněk Štybar
Stage 5 UAE Tour, Elia Viviani
Omloop Het Nieuwsblad, Zdeněk Štybar
Kuurne–Brussels–Kuurne, Bob Jungels
Le Samyn, Florian Sénéchal
Strade Bianche, Julian Alaphilippe
Stages 2 & 6 Tirreno–Adriatico, Julian Alaphilippe
Stage 3 Tirreno–Adriatico, Elia Viviani
Milan–San Remo, Julian Alaphilippe
E3 BinckBank Classic, Zdeněk Štybar
Stage 2 Tour of the Basque Country, Julian Alaphilippe
Scheldeprijs, Fabio Jakobsen
Paris–Roubaix, Philippe Gilbert
Stage 3 Tour of Turkey, Fabio Jakobsen
La Flèche Wallonne, Julian Alaphilippe
Argentina Road Race Championships, Maximiliano Richeze
Stage 2 Tour of California, Kasper Asgreen
Stage 3 Tour of California, Rémi Cavagna
Stage 4 Tour of California, Fabio Jakobsen
Stage 2 Hammer Stavanger
Stage 2 Tour of Norway, Álvaro José Hodeg
Overall Hammer Limburg

Stages 1 & 2

Overall Tour of Belgium, Remco Evenepoel

Stage 2, Remco Evenepoel

Stage 6 Critérium du Dauphiné, Julian Alaphilippe
Stages 4 & 5 Tour de Suisse, Elia Viviani
Stages 8 (ITT) Tour de Suisse, Yves Lampaert
Heylen Vastgoed Heistse Pijl, Álvaro José Hodeg
Denmark Time Trial Championships, Kasper Asgreen
Denmark Road Race Championships, Michael Mørkøv
Luxembourg Time Trial Championships, Bob Jungels
Luxembourg Road Race Championships, Bob Jungels
Netherlands Road Race Championships, Fabio Jakobsen
Stages 3 & 13 (ITT) Tour de France, Julian Alaphilippe
Stage 4 Tour de France, Elia Viviani
Stage 1 Adriatica Ionica Race, Álvaro José Hodeg
Stage 3 Adriatica Ionica Race, Remco Evenepoel
Clásica de San Sebastián, Remco Evenepoel
Prudential RideLondon-Surrey Classic, Elia Viviani
UEC European Time Trial Championships, Remco Evenepoel
Pan American Games Road Race Championships, Maximiliano Richeze
UEC European Road Championships, Elia Viviani
Stage 5 BinckBank Tour, Álvaro José Hodeg
EuroEyes Cyclassics Hamburg, Elia Viviani
Stages 4 & 21 Vuelta a España, Fabio Jakobsen
Stage 3 Deutschland Tour, Kasper Asgreen
Stages 12 & 17 Vuelta a España, Philippe Gilbert
Stage 19 Vuelta a España, Rémi Cavagna
Kampioenschap van Vlaanderen, Jannik Steimle
Overall Okolo Slovenska, Yves Lampaert

Stage 4, Elia Viviani

Sparkassen Münsterland Giro, Álvaro José Hodeg
Overall Tour of Guangxi, Enric Mas
Stage 4 Enric Mas
UEC European Track Championships – Madison, Michael Mørkøv
Six Days of London, Elia Viviani
UEC European Track Championships – Elimination Race, Elia Viviani
National Track Championships – Omnium, Elia Viviani

== 2020 – Deceuninck–Quick-Step ==
Stage 1 Tour Down Under, Sam Bennett
Overall Vuelta a San Juan, Remco Evenepoel

Stage 3 (ITT), Remco Evenepoel
Stage 6 Vuelta a San Juan, Zdeněk Štybar

Race Torquay, Sam Bennett
Cadel Evans Great Ocean Road Race, Dries Devenyns
Stage 5 Volta a la Comunitat Valenciana, Fabio Jakobsen
New Zealand Road Race Championships, Shane Archbold
Overall Volta ao Algarve, Remco Evenepoel

Stage 1, Fabio Jakobsen
Stages 2 & 5 (ITT), Remco Evenepoel

Classic Sud-Ardèche, Rémi Cavagna
Kuurne–Brussels–Kuurne, Kasper Asgreen
Grote Prijs Jean-Pierre Monseré, Fabio Jakobsen
Overall Vuelta a Burgos, Remco Evenepoel

Stage 3, Remco Evenepoel
Stage 4, Sam Bennett

Overall Tour de Pologne, Remco Evenepoel

Stage 1, Fabio Jakobsen
Stage 4, Remco Evenepoel
Stage 5, Davide Ballerini

Stage 1 Tour de l'Ain, Andrea Bagioli
Stage 3 Tour de Wallonie, Sam Bennett
Luxembourg Time Trial Championships, Bob Jungels
France Time Trial Championships, Rémi Cavagna
Denmark Road Race Championships, Kasper Asgreen
Druivenkoers Overijse, Florian Sénéchal
Stage 1b (TTT) Settimana Internazionale di Coppi e Bartali
Stage 2 Settimana Internazionale di Coppi e Bartali, Andrea Bagioli
Points classification, Tour de France, Sam Bennett

Stage 2, Julian Alaphilippe
Stages 10 & 21, Sam Bennett

Overall Okolo Slovenska, Jannik Steimle

Stage 1b (ITT), Jannik Steimle

World Road Race Championships, Julian Alaphilippe
Denmark Time Trial Championships, Kasper Asgreen
Brabantse Pijl, Julian Alaphilippe
Three Days of Bruges–De Panne, Yves Lampaert
Stage 4 Vuelta a España, Sam Bennett

== 2021 – Deceuninck–Quick-Step ==
Stages 1 & 2 Tour de la Provence, Davide Ballerini
Stages 4 & 6 UAE Tour, Sam Bennett
Omloop Het Nieuwsblad, Davide Ballerini
La Drôme Classic, Andrea Bagioli
GP Industria & Artigianato di Larciano, Mauri Vansevenant
Stages 1 & 5 Paris–Nice, Sam Bennett
Stage 2 Tirreno–Adriatico, Julian Alaphilippe
Classic Brugge–De Panne, Sam Bennett
E3 Saxo Bank Classic, Kasper Asgreen
Stage 5, Settimana Internazionale di Coppi e Bartali, Mikkel Frølich Honoré
Tour of Flanders, Kasper Asgreen
Stage 5 Tour of the Basque Country, Mikkel Frølich Honoré
Stages 2, 3, 4 & 8 Presidential Tour of Turkey, Mark Cavendish
La Flèche Wallonne, Julian Alaphilippe
Stage 5 (ITT) Tour de Romandie, Rémi Cavagna
Stages 1 & 3 Volta ao Algarve, Sam Bennett
Stage 4 (ITT) Volta ao Algarve, Kasper Asgreen
Overall Tour of Belgium, Remco Evenepoel

Stage 2 (ITT), Remco Evenepoel
Stage 5, Mark Cavendish

Belgium Time Trial Championships, Yves Lampaert
Denmark Time Trial Championships, Kasper Asgreen
Czech Republic Time Trial Championships, Josef Černý
Portugal Time Trial Championships, João Almeida
France Road Race Championships, Rémi Cavagna
Points classification, Tour de France, Mark Cavendish

Stage 1, Julian Alaphilippe
Stages 4, 6, 10 & 13, Mark Cavendish

Stages 2 & 5 Tour de Wallonie, Fabio Jakobsen
Stage 1 Tour de l'Ain, Álvaro Hodeg
Overall Tour de Pologne, João Almeida

Stages 2 & 4, João Almeida
Stage 6 (ITT), Rémi Cavagna

Overall Danmark Rundt, Remco Evenepoel

Stages 3 & 5 (ITT), Remco Evenepoel

Points classification, Vuelta a España, Fabio Jakobsen

Stages 4, 8 & 16, Fabio Jakobsen
Stage 13, Florian Sénéchal

Grote Prijs Marcel Kint, Álvaro Hodeg
Druivenkoers Overijse, Remco Evenepoel
Brussels Cycling Classic, Remco Evenepoel
Stage 7 Tour of Britain, Yves Lampaert
Overall Tour de Luxembourg, João Almeida

Stage 1, João Almeida
Stage 4 (ITT), Mattia Cattaneo

Stage 1 Okolo Slovenska, Álvaro Hodeg
Stage 2 Okolo Slovenska, Jannik Steimle
Primus Classic, Florian Sénéchal
Gooikse Pijl, Fabio Jakobsen
World Road Race Championships, Julian Alaphilippe
Eurométropole Tour, Fabio Jakobsen
Münsterland Giro, Mark Cavendish
Coppa Bernocchi, Remco Evenepoel

== 2022 – Quick-Step Alpha Vinyl Team ==
Stage 1 Volta a la Comunitat Valenciana, Remco Evenepoel
Stage 2 & 5 Volta a la Comunitat Valenciana, Fabio Jakobsen
Stage 2 Tour of Oman, Mark Cavendish
Stage 4 Tour of Oman, Fausto Masnada
Overall Volta ao Algarve, Remco Evenepoel

Stages 1 & 3 Volta ao Algarve, Fabio Jakobsen
Stage 4 (ITT), Remco Evenepoel

Stage 2 UAE Tour, Mark Cavendish
Kuurne–Brussels–Kuurne, Fabio Jakobsen
Stage 2 Paris–Nice, Fabio Jakobsen
Milano–Torino, Mark Cavendish
Stage 1 Settimana Internazionale di Coppi e Bartali, Mauro Schmid
Stage 5 Volta a Catalunya, Ethan Vernon
Stage 5 Settimana Internazionale di Coppi e Bartali, Josef Černý
Stage 7 Volta a Catalunya, Andrea Bagioli
Stage 2 Tour of the Basque Country, Julian Alaphilippe
Liège–Bastogne–Liège, Remco Evenepoel
Stage 3 Giro d'Italia, Mark Cavendish
Stage 2 & 3 Tour de Hongrie, Fabio Jakobsen
Overall Tour of Norway, Remco Evenepoel

Stages 1, 3 & 5 Tour of Norway, Remco Evenepoel

Elfstedenronde, Fabio Jakobsen
Overall Tour of Belgium, Mauro Schmid

Stage 3 (ITT), Yves Lampaert
Stage 5, Fabio Jakobsen

Stage 8 Tour de Suisse, Remco Evenepoel
Belgium Time Trial Championships, Remco Evenepoel
France Road Race Championships, Florian Sénéchal
United Kingdom Road Race Championships, Mark Cavendish
Stage 1 (ITT) Tour de France, Yves Lampaert
Stage 2 Tour de France, Fabio Jakobsen
Stage 1 Tour de Wallonie, Julian Alaphilippe
Stage 4 Tour de Wallonie, Davide Ballerini
Clásica de San Sebastián, Remco Evenepoel
UEC European Road Championships, Fabio Jakobsen
Overall Vuelta a España, Remco Evenepoel

Stages 10 (ITT) & 18, Remco Evenepoel

Overall Okolo Slovenska, Josef Černý

Prologue & Stage 1, Ethan Vernon

Kampioenschap van Vlaanderen, Fabio Jakobsen
World Road Race Championships, Remco Evenepoel
Coppa Bernocchi, Davide Ballerini

== 2023 – Soudal–Quick-Step ==
Stage 2 Vuelta a San Juan, Fabio Jakobsen
Trofeo Palma, Ethan Vernon
Stage 1 Tour of Oman, Tim Merlier
Figueira Champions Classic, Casper Pedersen
Stage 5 Tour of Oman, Mauri Vansevenant
Overall UAE Tour, Remco Evenepoel

Stage 1 & 6 UAE Tour, Tim Merlier
Stage 2 (TTT), Soudal Quick-Step

Ardèche Classic, Julian Alaphilippe
Stage 1 Paris–Nice, Tim Merlier
Stage 2 Tirreno–Adriatico, Fabio Jakobsen
Nokere Koerse, Tim Merlier
Overall Settimana Internazionale di Coppi e Bartali, Mauro Schmid

Stage 1 & 5 Rémi Cavagna

Stage 3 & 7 Volta a Catalunya, Remco Evenepoel
Liège–Bastogne–Liège, Remco Evenepoel
Prologue Tour de Romandie, Josef Černý
Stage 1 Tour de Romandie, Ethan Vernon
Stage 1 (ITT) & 9 (ITT) Giro d'Italia, Remco Evenepoel
Stage 2 Tour de Hongrie, Fabio Jakobsen
Stage 6 Four Days of Dunkirk, Tim Merlier
Stage 2 Critérium du Dauphiné, Julian Alaphilippe
Stages 2 & 5 Tour of Belgium, Fabio Jakobsen
Stage 7 Tour de Suisse, Remco Evenepoel
France National Time Trial Championships, Rémi Cavagna
Denmark National Time Trial Championships, Kasper Asgreen
Belgium National Road Race Championships, Remco Evenepoel
Stage 18 Tour de France, Kasper Asgreen
Stage 5 Tour de Wallonie, Andrea Bagioli
Clásica de San Sebastián, Remco Evenepoel
Stages 1 & 7 Tour de Pologne, Tim Merlier
Stage 6 (ITT) Tour de Pologne, Mattia Cattaneo
UCI World Time Trial Championships, Remco Evenepoel
Stage 2 & 4 Danmark Rundt, Fabio Jakobsen
Overall Deutschland Tour, Ilan Van Wilder

Prologue Ethan Vernon
Stage 1 Ilan Van Wilder

Mountains classification Vuelta a España, Remco Evenepoel

Stages 3, 14 & 18, Remco Evenepoel

Grand Prix de Fourmies, Tim Merlier
Overall Okolo Slovenska, Rémi Cavagna

Stage 1 Rémi Cavagna
Stages 2 & 4, Tim Merlier
Stage 3 Andrea Bagioli
Stage 5 Kasper Asgreen

Tre Valli Varesine, Ilan Van Wilder
Gran Piemonte, Andrea Bagioli

== 2024 – Soudal–Quick-Step ==
Trofeo Ses Salines–Felanitx, Paul Magnier
Stages 3 & 4 AlUla Tour, Tim Merlier
Figueira Champions Classic, Remco Evenepoel
Stage 3 Tour of Oman, Paul Magnier
Overall Volta ao Algarve, Remco Evenepoel

Stage 4 (ITT), Remco Evenepoel

Stages 1, 4 & 6 UAE Tour, Tim Merlier
Stage 8 Paris–Nice, Remco Evenepoel
Nokere Koerse, Tim Merlier
Scheldeprijs, Tim Merlier
Stages 3, 18 & 21 Giro d'Italia, Tim Merlier
Stage 12 Giro d'Italia, Julian Alaphilippe
Stage 4 Four Days of Dunkirk, Warre Vangheluwe
Stage 4 (ITT) Critérium du Dauphiné, Remco Evenepoel
Stage 1 (ITT) Tour de Suisse, Yves Lampaert
Stages 2 & 5 Tour of Belgium, Tim Merlier
Stage 3 Okolo Slovenska, Julian Alaphilippe
Young rider classification Tour de France, Remco Evenepoel

Stage 7 (ITT) Remco Evenepoel

Stage 1 Czech Tour, Luke Lamperti
Stage 4 Czech Tour, Julian Alaphilippe
Olympic Time Trial, Remco Evenepoel
Olympic Road Race, Remco Evenepoel
Stages 5 Tour de Pologne, Tim Merlier
Stages 1, 4 & 5 Tour of Britain, Paul Magnier
UEC European Road Championships, Tim Merlier
Kampioenschap van Vlaanderen, Tim Merlier
Gooikse Pijl, Tim Merlier
UCI World Time Trial Championships, Remco Evenepoel

== 2025 – Soudal–Quick-Step ==
Stages 1 & 3 AlUla Tour, Tim Merlier
Stage 1 Étoile de Bessèges, Paul Magnier
Stage 2 Tour of Oman, Louis Vervaeke
Stage 5 Tour of Oman, Valentin Paret-Peintre
Stages 5 & 6 UAE Tour, Tim Merlier
Stage 1 & 2 Paris–Nice, Tim Merlier
Stage 1 Tour of the Basque Country, Maximilian Schachmann
Scheldeprijs, Tim Merlier
Brabantse Pijl, Remco Evenepoel
Stage 5 (ITT) Tour de Romandie, Remco Evenepoel
Heistse Pijl, Paul Magnier
Brussels Cycling Classic, Tim Merlier
Dwars door het Hageland, Paul Magnier
Elfstedenronde, Paul Magnier
Stage 4 (ITT) Critérium du Dauphiné, Remco Evenepoel
Stages 1 & 5 Tour of Belgium, Tim Merlier

Stage 3 (ITT), Ethan Hayter

United Kingdom National Time Trial Championships, Ethan Hayter
Belgium National Road Race Championships, Remco Evenepoel
Germany National Time Trial Championships, Maximilian Schachmann
Stage 3 & 9 Tour de France, Tim Merlier
Stage 5 (ITT) Tour de France, Remco Evenepoel

Stage 16 Tour de France, Valentin Paret-Peintre

Stages 4 Tour de Pologne, Paul Magnier
Overall Czech Cycling Tour, Junior Lecerf
Stage 1 Czech Tour, Luke Lamperti
Stage 2 Czech Tour, Junior Lecerf
Stage 1 & 4 Renewi Tour, Tim Merlier
Stage 5 Tour of Britain, Remco Evenepoel
Grand Prix de Fourmies, Paul Magnier
Stages 1, 2, 3 & 4 Okolo Slovenska, Paul Magnier
Stage 4 (ITT) Tour de Luxembourg, Ethan Hayter
UCI World Time Trial Championships, Remco Evenepoel
Omloop van het Houtland, Tim Merlier
Stages 1, 2, 3 & 5 CRO Race, Paul Magnier
UEC European Time Trial Championships, Remco Evenepoel
Prologue & Stage 2 Tour of Holland, Ethan Hayter
Stage 1 Tour of Holland, Tim Merlier
Stages 1, 2, 3, 4 & 6 Tour of Guangxi, Paul Magnier

== 2026 – Soudal–Quick-Step ==
Stage 1 & 4 Volta ao Algarve, Paul Magnier
Overall Giro di Sardegna, Filippo Zana
Stage 4 Giro di Sardegna, Filippo Zana
Scheldeprijs, Tim Merlier
Ronde van Limburg, Tim Merlier
Stages 1, 3 & 18 Giro d'Italia, Paul Magnier
Points classification Giro d'Italia, Paul Magnier
Stage 1, 3 & 5 Tour de Hongrie, Tim Merlier
Muur Classic Geraardsbergen, Tim Merlier
Stage 2 Tour of Belgium, Tim Merlier
United Kingdom National Time Trial Championships, Ethan Hayter
Stage 7, 8 & 12 Tour de France, Tim Merlier

== Supplementary statistics ==
World Team Time Trial performance
| World TTT Championships | 2003 | 2004 | 2005 | 2006 | 2007 | 2008 | 2009 | 2010 | 2011 | 2012 | 2013 | 2014 | 2015 | 2016 | 2017 | 2018 | 2019 | 2020 | 2021 | 2022 | 2023 | 2024 | 2025 | 2026 |
| Position | Did not Exist | | | | | | | | | 1 | 1 | 3 | 2 | 1 | 4 | 1 | No longer held | | | | | | | |
| Margin | Did not Exist | | | | | | | | | - | - | + 35" | + 11" | - | + 35" | - | No longer held | | | | | | | |
Grand Tours by highest finishing position
| Race | 2003 | 2004 | 2005 | 2006 | 2007 | 2008 | 2009 | 2010 | 2011 | 2012 | 2013 | 2014 | 2015 | 2016 | 2017 | 2018 | 2019 | 2020 | 2021 | 2022 | 2023 | 2024 | 2025 | 2026 |
| Giro d'Italia | – | – | 38 | 7 | 34 | 19 | 10 | 39 | 12 | 12 | 61 | 2 | 14 | 6 | 8 | 31 | 33 | 4 | 6 | 30 | 12 | 8 | 19 | 29 |
| Tour de France | 16 | 15 | 41 | 70 | 20 | 35 | 18 | 16 | 12 | 27 | 11 | 24 | 42 | 9 | 6 | 11 | 5 | 36 | 12 | 96 | 33 | 3 | 29 | 44 |
| Vuelta a España | 42 | 49 | 10 | 59 | 10 | 15 | 20 | 64 | 23 | 24 | 31 | 38 | 13 | 7 | 42 | 2 | 11 | 17 | 90 | 1 | 12 | 8 | 12 | 18 |
Major week-long stage races by highest finishing position
| Race | 2003 | 2004 | 2005 | 2006 | 2007 | 2008 | 2009 | 2010 | 2011 | 2012 | 2013 | 2014 | 2015 | 2016 | 2017 | 2018 | 2019 | 2020 | 2021 | 2022 | 2023 | 2024 | 2025 | 2026 |
| Tour Down Under | 8 | 12 | 34 | – | – | 28 | 1 | 14 | 21 | 13 | 20 | 13 | 15 | 21 | 26 | 5 | 10 | 12 | NH | | 5 | 6 | 20 | 6 |
| Paris–Nice | 19 | 8 | 24 | 28 | 45 | 6 | 3 | 13 | 35 | 8 | 5 | 15 | 2 | 20 | 3 | 18 | 8 | 15 | 32 | 20 | 35 | 2 | 10 | 12 |
| Tirreno–Adriatico | 5 | 1 | 61 | 33 | 63 | 18 | 40 | 28 | 45 | 15 | 4 | 18 | 3 | 3 | 14 | 17 | 6 | 6 | 6 | 11 | 30 | 52 | 7 | 48 |
| Volta a Catalunya | – | – | 4 | 29 | 19 | 25 | 33 | 55 | 8 | 9 | 29 | 22 | 5 | 3 | 6 | 24 | 9 | NH | 7 | 56 | 2 | 2 | 4 | 4 |
| Tour of the Basque Country | – | 36 | 8 | 37 | 32 | 28 | 16 | 9 | 37 | 5 | 20 | 2 | 8 | 25 | 4 | 6 | 11 | NH | 11 | 4 | 8 | 25 | 3 | 46 |
| Tour de Romandie | – | – | 28 | 34 | 40 | 7 | 22 | 28 | 28 | 48 | 11 | 14 | 5 | 18 | 8 | 42 | 14 | NH | 3 | 23 | 46 | 4 | 5 | 10 |
| Critérium du Dauphiné | 23 | 5 | 30 | 39 | 26 | 10 | 43 | 12 | 38 | 23 | 46 | 20 | 13 | 3 | 3 | 21 | 28 | 20 | 73 | 16 | 10 | 7 | 4 | 13 |
| Tour de Suisse | 12 | 7 | 2 | 29 | 16 | 18 | 45 | 17 | 17 | 3 | 23 | 4 | 23 | 33 | 29 | 4 | 9 | NH | 9 | 11 | 3 | 40 | 8 | 40 |
| Tour de Pologne | – | – | 22 | 41 | 22 | 20 | 5 | 30 | 19 | 2 | 24 | 10 | 26 | 36 | 12 | 19 | 10 | 1 | 1 | 6 | 4 | 45 | 41 | 17 |
| Benelux Tour | NH | NH | 6 | 12 | 7 | 2 | 2 | 15 | 8 | 2 | 1 | 20 | 10 | 1 | 9 | 4 | 13 | 4 | 12 | NH | 3 | 11 | 19 | 14 |
Monument races by highest finishing position
| Monument | 2003 | 2004 | 2005 | 2006 | 2007 | 2008 | 2009 | 2010 | 2011 | 2012 | 2013 | 2014 | 2015 | 2016 | 2017 | 2018 | 2019 | 2020 | 2021 | 2022 | 2023 | 2024 | 2025 | 2026 |
| Milan–San Remo | 1 | 8 | 8 | 1 | 3 | 28 | 4 | 2 | 20 | 22 | 4 | 5 | 46 | 10 | 3 | 19 | 1 | 2 | 16 | 14 | 11 | 9 | 26 | 7 |
| Tour of Flanders | 2 | 9 | 1 | 1 | 12 | 1 | 1 | 2 | 2 | 1 | 13 | 4 | 2 | 8 | 1 | 1 | 2 | 5 | 1 | 23 | 7 | 18 | 38 | 6 |
| Paris–Roubaix | 7 | 5 | 1 | 2 | 6 | 1 | 1 | 5 | 38 | 1 | 3 | 1 | 2 | 2 | 2 | 3 | 1 | NH | 5 | 10 | 23 | 36 | 28 | 3 |
| Liège–Bastogne–Liège | 11 | 22 | 4 | 2 | 4 | 9 | 13 | 46 | 19 | 28 | 27 | 3 | 2 | 23 | 2 | 1 | 16 | 5 | 2 | 1 | 1 | 6 | 35 | 10 |
| Giro di Lombardia | 8 | 29 | 1 | 1 | 9 | 4 | 17 | 13 | 13 | 30 | 7 | 35 | 10 | 12 | 2 | 24 | 13 | 57 | 2 | 13 | 2 | 2 | 2 | 9 |
Classics by highest finishing position
| Classic | 2003 | 2004 | 2005 | 2006 | 2007 | 2008 | 2009 | 2010 | 2011 | 2012 | 2013 | 2014 | 2015 | 2016 | 2017 | 2018 | 2019 | 2020 | 2021 | 2022 | 2023 | 2024 | 2025 | 2026 |
| Omloop Het Nieuwsblad | 1 | NH | 1 | 5 | 3 | 16 | 10 | 20 | 6 | 2 | 2 | 5 | 2 | 11 | 9 | 5 | 1 | 2 | 1 | 9 | 6 | 21 | 2 | 11 |
| Kuurne–Brussels–Kuurne | 4 | 2 | 11 | 1 | 1 | 1 | 1 | 12 | 17 | 28 | NH | 1 | 1 | 5 | 5 | 12 | 1 | 1 | 9 | 1 | 9 | 7 | 15 | 6 |
| Strade Bianche | Did not Exist | | | | — | 38 | — | — | — | — | — | 1 | 1 | 2 | 4 | 7 | 1 | 6 | 2 | 3 | 30 | 40 | 11 | 15 |
| Milano–Torino | — | — | — | — | 57 | NH | | | | 24 | — | — | — | — | 11 | 29 | 10 | 19 | 3 | 1 | — | — | — | — |
| Classic Brugge-De Panne | Did not Exist | | | | | | | | | | | | | | | 1 | 3 | 1 | 1 | 12 | 3 | 2 | 15 | 8 |
| E3 Harelbeke | 12 | 1 | 1 | 1 | 1 | 8 | 2 | 2 | 14 | 1 | 6 | 2 | 2 | 12 | 2 | 1 | 1 | NH | 1 | 10 | 16 | 28 | 4 | 16 |
| Gent–Wevelgem | 3 | 1 | 26 | 4 | 27 | 3 | 33 | 22 | 1 | 1 | 8 | 5 | 2 | 6 | 4 | 2 | 19 | 2 | 14 | 32 | 14 | 8 | 2 | 10 |
| Dwars door Vlaanderen | 9 | 7 | 5 | 5 | 1 | 2 | 1 | 20 | 9 | 1 | 6 | 1 | 4 | 10 | 1 | 1 | 3 | NH | 4 | 14 | 7 | 26 | 18 | 19 |
| Scheldeprijs | 4 | 1 | 4 | 1 | 3 | 2 | 51 | 5 | 6 | 11 | 2 | 4 | 6 | 1 | 1 | 1 | 1 | 8 | 2 | 15 | 35 | 1 | 1 | 1 |
| Brabantse Pijl | 3 | 1 | 2 | 3 | 15 | 4 | 2 | 3 | 6 | 8 | 4 | 8 | 19 | 1 | 2 | 4 | 2 | 1 | 11 | 6 | 4 | 25 | 1 | 13 |
| Amstel Gold Race | 17 | 3 | 6 | 8 | 7 | 49 | 13 | 16 | 16 | 14 | 4 | 5 | 1 | 6 | 1 | 7 | 4 | NH | 6 | 6 | 6 | 4 | 3 | 7 |
| La Flèche Wallonne | 18 | 21 | 7 | 12 | 23 | 16 | 16 | 25 | 37 | 36 | 5 | 3 | 2 | 2 | 2 | 1 | 1 | 19 | 1 | 4 | 14 | 16 | 9 | 12 |
| Clásica de San Sebastián | 1 | 2 | 52 | 73 | 1 | 4 | 13 | 26 | 4 | 45 | 8 | 10 | 8 | 6 | 26 | 1 | 1 | NH | 3 | 1 | 1 | 2 | 37 | 22 |
| Hamburg Cyclassics | 1 | 2 | 1 | 3 | 7 | 47 | 4 | 15 | 2 | 4 | 7 | 5 | 4 | 9 | 6 | 1 | 1 | NH | | 22 | 6 | 13 | 3 | 1 |
| Brussels Cycling Classic | 2 | 1 | 11 | 2 | 5 | 2 | 2 | 30 | 28 | 1 | 8 | 6 | 3 | 1 | 10 | 4 | 13 | 2 | 1 | 21 | 11 | 18 | 1 | 36 |
| Paris–Tours | 8 | 6 | 14 | 10 | 4 | 10 | 2 | 8 | 35 | 3 | 10 | 29 | 1 | 1 | 1 | 2 | — | — | — | — | — | — | — | 2 |

Legend
| — | Did not compete |
| DNF | Did not finish |
| NH | Not held |
