= Roy Jans =

Belgian road cyclist

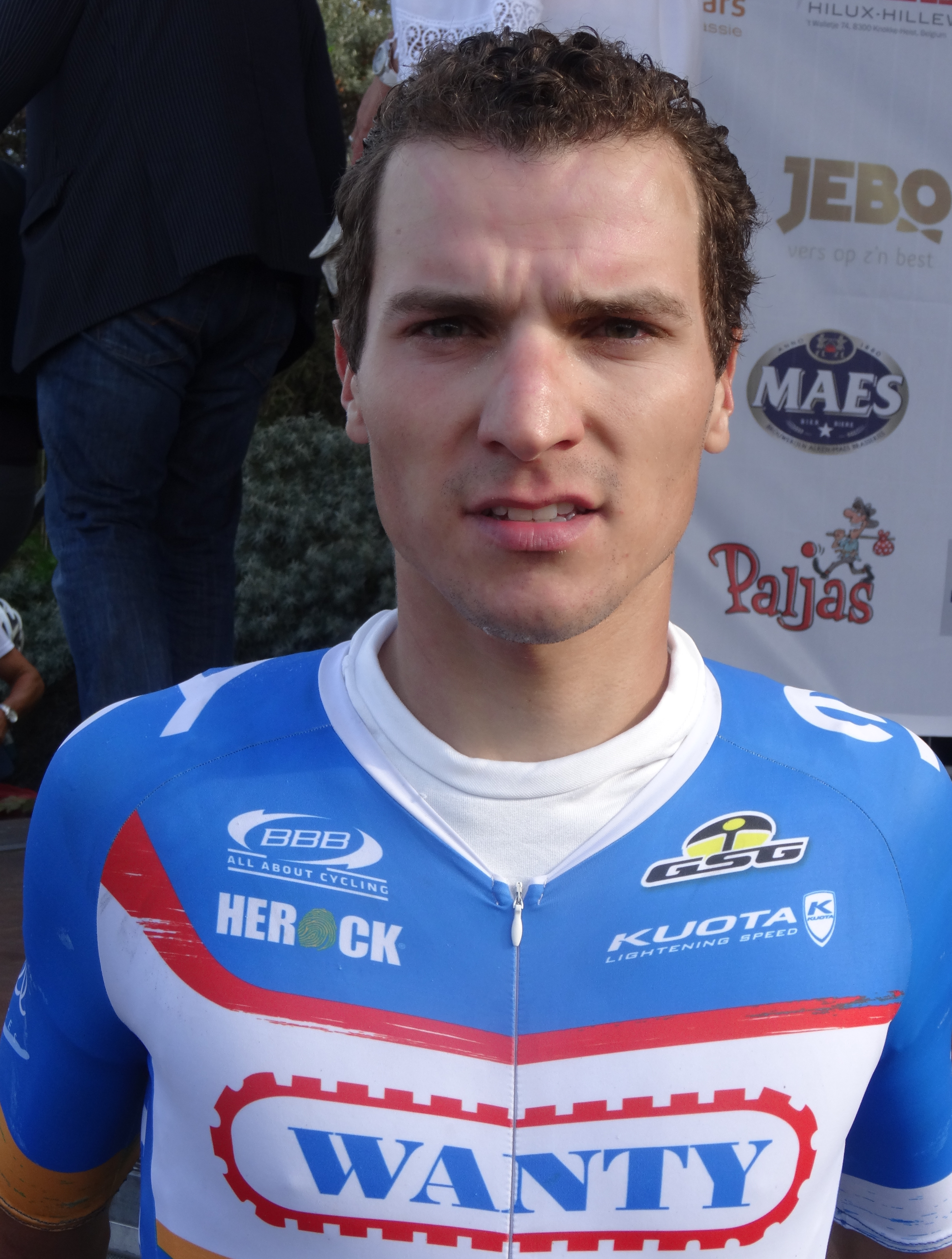
- Jans at the 2014 De Kustpijl

Personal information
- Full name: Roy Jans
- Born: 15 September 1990 (age 36) Bilzen, Belgium
- Height: 1.78 m (5 ft 10 in)
- Weight: 68 kg (150 lb)

Cycling career
- Sport: Cycling
- Current team: Retired
- Discipline: Road
- Role: Rider
- Rider type: Sprinter

Amateur teams
- 2009–2010: Davo–Lotto–Davitamon
- 2011: UC Seraing Crabbé Performance

Professional teams
- 2012: An Post–Sean Kelly
- 2013–2016: Accent Jobs–Wanty
- 2017: WB Veranclassic Aqua Protect
- 2018: Cibel–Cebon
- 2019–2021: Corendon–Circus

Roy Jans (born 15 September 1990) is a Belgian former racing cyclist, who competed as a professional from 2012 to 2021.

== Personal life ==
Jans is in a relationship with 2020 world cyclo-cross champion Ceylin del Carmen Alvarado.

== Major results ==
2011
9th Grand Prix Criquielion
2012
1st Kattekoers
3rd Road race, National Under-23 Road Championships
5th Memorial Van Coningsloo
6th Road race, UEC European Under-23 Road Championships
6th Nationale Sluitingsprijs
9th Grand Prix Impanis-Van Petegem
9th Memorial Rik Van Steenbergen
9th Grand Prix Criquielion
10th Grote Prijs Stad Geel
2013
8th Handzame Classic
10th Châteauroux Classic
2014
1st Gooikse Pijl
La Tropicale Amissa Bongo

1st Points classification
1st Stage 3

2nd Road race, National Road Championships
3rd Châteauroux Classic
3rd De Kustpijl
4th Paris–Tours
5th Brussels Cycling Classic
7th Halle–Ingooigem
7th Nationale Sluitingsprijs
2015
1st Stage 2 Étoile de Bessèges
2nd Brussels Cycling Classic
2nd Münsterland Giro
3rd De Kustpijl
4th Arnhem–Veenendaal Classic
5th Grand Prix d'Isbergues
5th Paris–Tours
6th Grand Prix Impanis-Van Petegem
8th Overall World Ports Classic
8th Nokere Koerse
8th Paris–Bourges
2016
1st Nationale Sluitingsprijs
2nd Münsterland Giro
5th De Kustpijl
8th Kampioenschap van Vlaanderen
9th Brussels Cycling Classic
10th Paris–Bourges
2017
1st Grand Prix de la ville de Pérenchies
2nd Grote Prijs Jean-Pierre Monseré
4th Paris–Troyes
5th Grand Prix de Denain
5th Nationale Sluitingsprijs
5th De Kustpijl
6th Kampioenschap van Vlaanderen
6th Grand Prix Pino Cerami
7th Handzame Classic
8th Münsterland Giro
9th Halle–Ingooigem
2018
1st Stage 2 Circuit des Ardennes
3rd Cholet-Pays de la Loire
4th Nokere Koerse
7th Three Days of Bruges–De Panne
7th Classic Loire-Atlantique
10th Gooikse Pijl
2019
1st Stage 4 Tour of Antalya
5th Scheldeprijs
6th Tacx Pro Classic
9th Gooikse Pijl
9th Münsterland Giro
10th Omloop van het Houtland
