= Hugo Hofstetter =

French cyclist

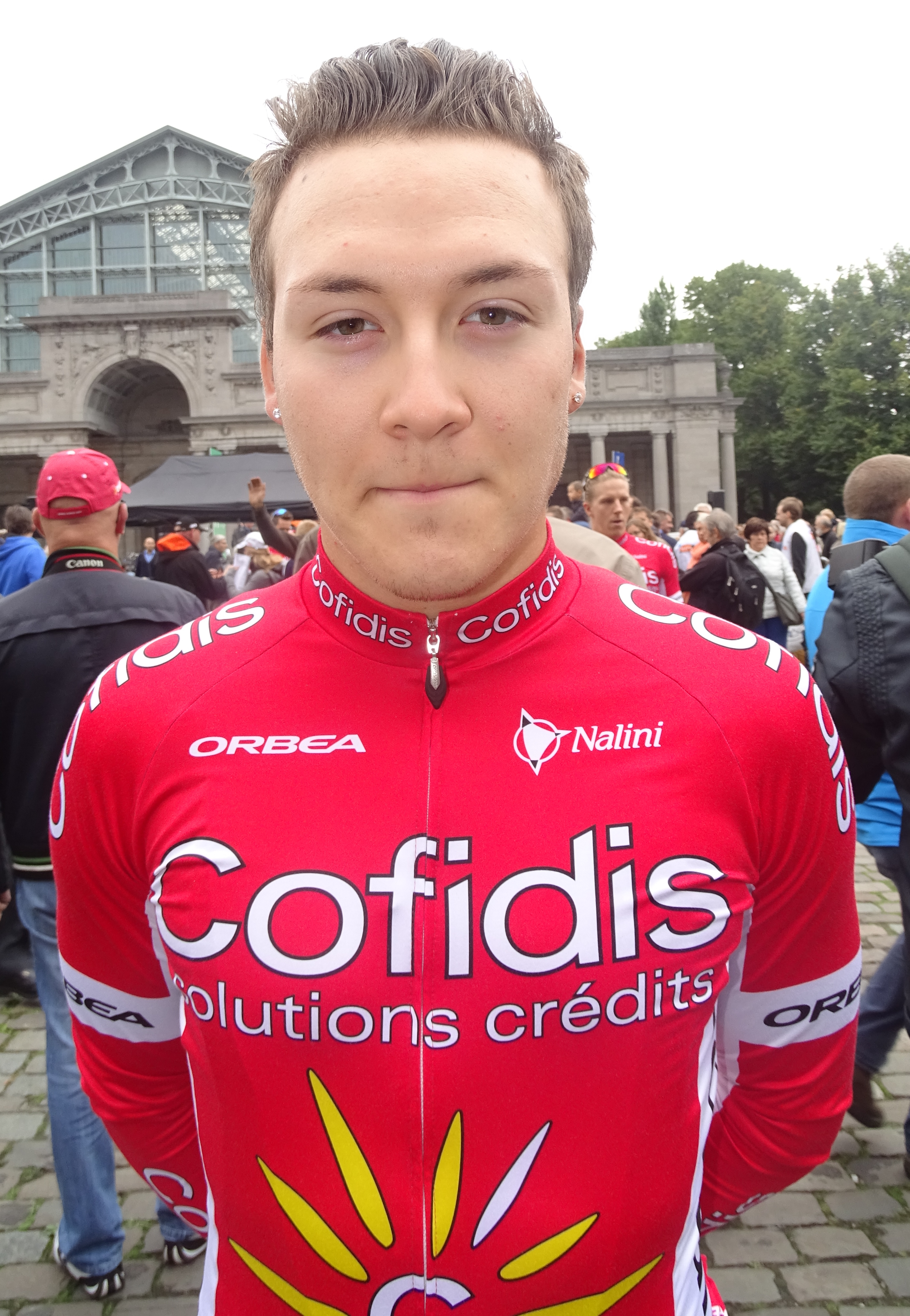
- Hofstetter in 2015

Personal information
- Full name: Hugo Hofstetter
- Born: 13 February 1994 (age 32) Altkirch, France
- Height: 1.7 m (5 ft 7 in)
- Weight: 65 kg (143 lb)

Cycling career
- Sport: Cycling
- Current team: NSN Cycling Team
- Discipline: Road
- Role: Rider
- Rider type: Sprinter

Amateur teams
- 2012: VC Sundgovia Altkirch Junior
- 2013: AC Bisontine
- 2014–2015: CC Étupes

Professional teams
- 2015: Cofidis (stagiaire)
- 2016–2019: Cofidis
- 2020–2021: Israel Start-Up Nation
- 2022–2023: Arkéa–Samsic
- 2024–: Israel–Premier Tech

Major wins
- Other UCI Europe Tour (2018)

Hugo Hofstetter (born 13 February 1994) is a French cyclist who currently rides for UCI ProTeam NSN Cycling Team. In August 2020, he was named in the startlist for the 2020 Tour de France. He finished in the top 10 of five stages during the race, including the final stage on the Champs-Élysées.

== Major results ==
2014
6th Paris–Tours Espoirs
2015
1st Road race, National Under-23 Road Championships
3rd Paris–Roubaix Espoirs
2016
7th La Roue Tourangelle
9th Classic Loire Atlantique
2017
3rd Classic Loire-Atlantique
5th Grand Prix de la Somme
10th Tro-Bro Léon
2018 (1 pro win)
1st Overall UCI Europe Tour
1st Overall French Cup
1st Stage 1 Tour de l'Ain
2nd Grand Prix de Denain
2nd Cholet-Pays de la Loire
3rd Nokere Koerse
3rd La Roue Tourangelle
3rd Elfstedenronde
4th Clásica de Almería
4th Tro-Bro Léon
4th Halle–Ingooigem
4th Polynormande
6th Classic Loire-Atlantique
8th Three Days of Bruges–De Panne
8th Route Adélie
8th Grand Prix de Fourmies
9th Paris–Camembert
2019
2nd Grote Prijs Jef Scherens
3rd Trofeo Palma
4th Scheldeprijs
4th Halle–Ingooigem
5th Eschborn–Frankfurt
5th Ronde van Drenthe
5th Nokere Koerse
9th Grote Prijs Marcel Kint
10th Grand Prix de Fourmies
2020 (1)
1st Le Samyn
6th Kuurne–Brussels–Kuurne
2021
4th Grand Prix de Denain
4th Grand Prix de Fourmies
4th Binche–Chimay–Binche
5th Le Samyn
5th Eurométropole Tour
5th Gooikse Pijl
6th Classic Brugge–De Panne
6th Trofeo Alcúdia–Port d'Alcúdia
2022 (1)
1st Tro-Bro Léon
2nd Bredene Koksijde Classic
2nd Le Samyn
3rd Kuurne–Brussels–Kuurne
3rd Grote Prijs Jean-Pierre Monseré
3rd Ronde van Drenthe
4th Trofeo Playa de Palma
4th Paris–Chauny
6th Overall Four Days of Dunkirk
7th Nokere Koerse
8th Hamburg Cyclassics
8th Rund um Köln
10th Paris–Tours
2023
2nd Le Samyn
7th Polynormande
9th Binche–Chimay–Binche
2024
4th Paris–Chauny
5th Scheldeprijs
6th Famenne Ardenne Classic
9th Nokere Koerse
9th Bredene Koksijde Classic
9th Druivenkoers Overijse
2025
2nd Grand Prix Criquielion
3rd Kuurne–Brussels–Kuurne
4th Grote Prijs Jean-Pierre Monseré
5th Gent–Wevelgem
6th Tour du Finistère
7th Le Samyn
10th Nokere Koerse
10th Volta NXT Classic
2026
3rd Le Samyn
5th Münsterland Giro
6th Scheldeprijs

=== Grand Tour general classification results timeline ===
Grand Tour	2020	2021	2022	2023	2024
Giro d'Italia	—	—	—	—	126
Tour de France	115	—	82	—	—
Vuelta a España	—	—	—	111	—

=== Classics results timeline ===
Monument	2016	2017	2018	2019	2020	2021	2022	2023	2024	2025
Milan–San Remo	—	—	—	—	—	66	—	—	—	
Tour of Flanders	—	DNF	—	—	DNF	24	—	86	—	
Paris–Roubaix	116	DNF	79	19	NH	41	—	78	79	
Liège–Bastogne–Liège	Has not contested during his career									
Giro di Lombardia	Has not contested during his career									
Classic	2016	2017	2018	2019	2020	2021	2022	2023	2024	2025
Kuurne–Brussels–Kuurne	—	—	88	11	6	59	3	—	29	3
Brugge–De Panne	—	—	8	—	14	6	—	—	127	64
Gent–Wevelgem	DNF	36	—	—	24	44	—	—	DNF	5
Scheldeprijs	—	96	—	4	15	40	—	56	5	
Eschborn–Frankfurt	—	—	—	5	NH	—	106	DNF	—	
Hamburg Cyclassics	—	114	—	—	NH	—	8	—	16	
Paris–Tours	—	—	—	—	—	26	10	—	70	

Legend
—	Did not compete
DNF	Did not finish
