= 2018 Classic Loire-Atlantique =

2018 UCI Europe Tour

Race details
- Dates: 24 March 2018
- Stages: 1
- Distance: 182.8 km (113.6 mi)
- Winning time: 4h 20' 47"

Results
	Winner	Rasmus Quaade (DEN)
	Second	Daniel Hoelgaard (NOR)
	Third	Armindo Fonseca (FRA)

The 2018 Classic Loire-Atlantique was the 19th edition of the Classic Loire-Atlantique road cycling one day race. It was held on 24 March 2018 as part of UCI Europe Tour in category 1.1.

== Teams ==
Nineteen teams of up to seven riders started the race:

UCI WorldTeams

- AG2R La Mondiale
- Groupama–FDJ

UCI Professional Continental teams

- Cofidis
- Direct Énergie
- Fortuneo–Samsic
- Roompot–Nederlandse Loterij
- Vital Concept
- Delko–Marseille Provence KTM
- Euskadi–Murias
- Gazprom–RusVelo
- UnitedHealthcare

UCI Continental teams

- BHS–Almeborg Bornholm
- D'Amico Utensilnord
- Roubaix–Lille Métropole
- Tarteletto–Isorex
- Cibel–Cebon
- Interpro Stradalli
- St. Michel–Auber93
- Team Vorarlberg Santic

== Result ==
Final general classification

Rank	Rider	Team	Time
1	Rasmus Quaade (DEN)	BHS–Almeborg Bornholm	4h 20' 47"
2	Daniel Hoelgaard (NOR)	Groupama–FDJ	+ 3"
3	Armindo Fonseca (FRA)	Fortuneo–Samsic	s.t.
4	Damien Touzé (FRA)	St. Michel–Auber93	s.t.
5	Maxime Daniel (FRA)	Fortuneo–Samsic	s.t.
6	Hugo Hofstetter (FRA)	Cofidis	s.t.
7	Roy Jans (BEL)	Cibel–Cebon	s.t.
8	Tim Ariesen (NED)	Roompot–Nederlandse Loterij	s.t.
9	Samuel Dumoulin (FRA)	AG2R La Mondiale	s.t.
10	Roman Maikin (RUS)	Gazprom–RusVelo	s.t.
