= 2018 Nokere Koerse =

2018 UCI Europe Tour

Race details
- Dates: 14 March 2018
- Stages: 1
- Distance: 191.1 km (118.7 mi)
- Winning time: 4h 32' 56"

Results
	Winner	Fabio Jakobsen (NED)	(Quick-Step Floors)
	Second	Amaury Capiot (BEL)	(Sport Vlaanderen–Baloise)
	Third	Hugo Hofstetter (FRA)	(Cofidis)

The 2018 Nokere Koerse was the 73rd edition of the Nokere Koerse road cycling one day race. It was held on 14 March 2018 as part of the UCI Europe Tour in category 1.HC.

The race was won by Fabio Jakobsen of Quick-Step Floors, ahead of Amaury Capiot and Hugo Hofstetter.

== Teams ==
Twenty-three teams of up to seven riders started the race:

UCI WorldTeams

- BMC Racing Team
- Lotto–Soudal
- Team Katusha–Alpecin
- Team Sunweb
- Quick-Step Floors
- Bora–Hansgrohe
- Team Sky

UCI Professional Continental teams

- Cofidis
- Sport Vlaanderen–Baloise
- Vérandas Willems–Crelan
- CCC–Sprandi–Polkowice
- Roompot–Nederlandse Loterij
- Israel Cycling Academy
- UnitedHealthcare
- Aqua Blue Sport
- Wanty–Groupe Gobert
- Delko–Marseille Provence KTM
- Direct Énergie
- Vital Concept
- Hagens Berman Axeon
- WB Aqua Protect Veranclassic

UCI Continental teams

- Cibel–Cebon
- Tarteletto–Isorex

== Results ==
Result
Rank	Rider	Team	Time
1	Fabio Jakobsen (NED)	Quick-Step Floors	4h 32' 56"
2	Amaury Capiot (BEL)	Sport Vlaanderen–Baloise	s.t.
3	Hugo Hofstetter (FRA)	Cofidis	s.t.
4	Roy Jans (BEL)	Cibel–Cebon	s.t.
5	Andrew Fenn (GBR)	Aqua Blue Sport	s.t.
6	Baptiste Planckaert (BEL)	Team Katusha–Alpecin	s.t.
7	Zak Dempster (AUS)	Israel Cycling Academy	s.t.
8	Sean De Bie (BEL)	Vérandas Willems–Crelan	s.t.
9	Maxime Vantomme (BEL)	WB Aqua Protect Veranclassic	s.t.
10	Kamil Gradek (POL)	CCC–Sprandi–Polkowice	s.t.
