= Tim Ariesen =

Dutch cyclist

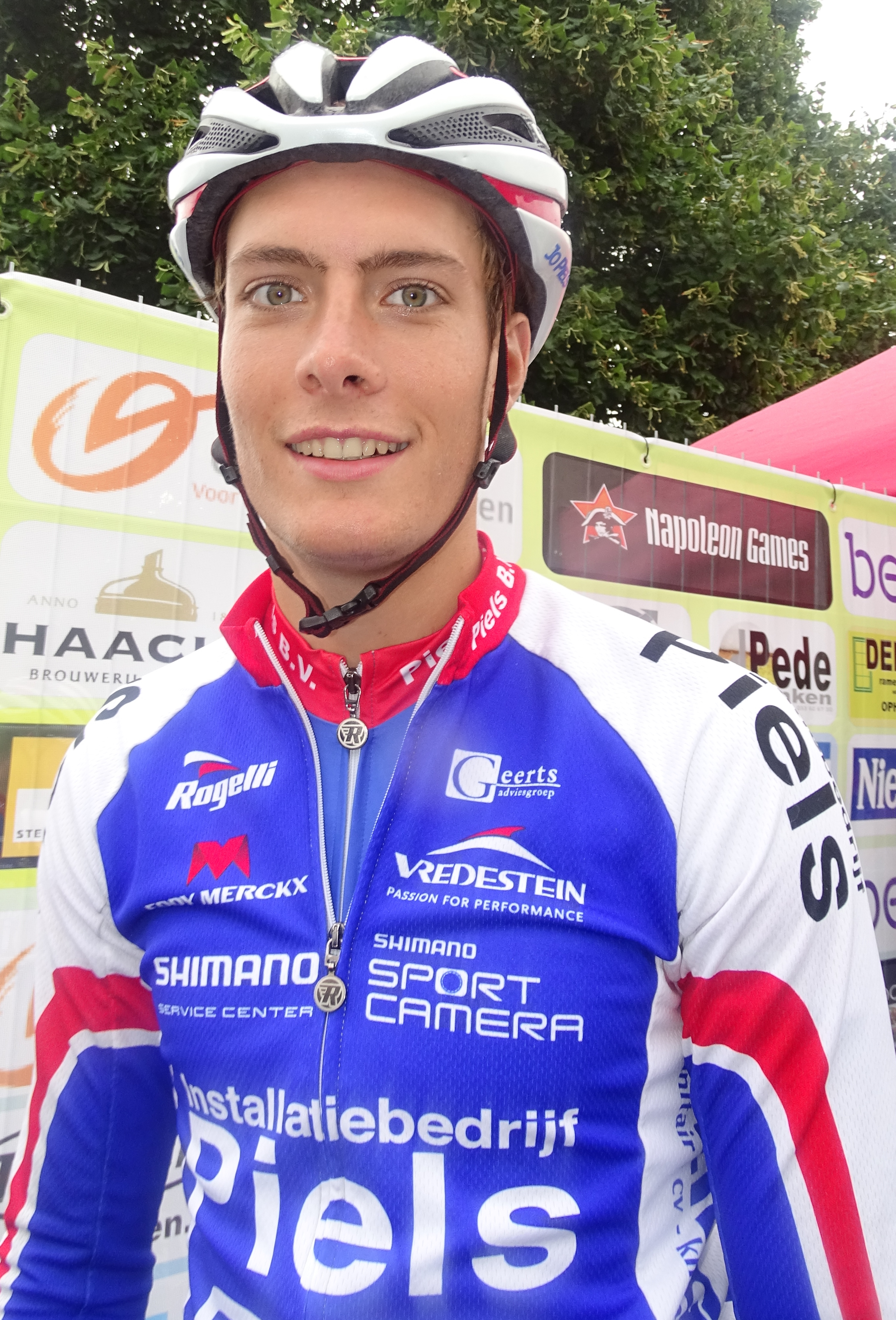
- Ariesen in 2015

Personal information
- Full name: Tim Ariesen
- Born: 20 March 1994 (age 32) Rhenen, Netherlands

Cycling career
- Sport: Cycling
- Current team: Retired
- Discipline: Road
- Role: Rider

Amateur teams
- 2007–2010: WV Valley Riders AXA
- 2011–2012: UWTC De Volharding
- 2013: Croford

Professional teams
- 2014–2015: Cycling Team Jo Piels
- 2016: SEG Racing Academy
- 2017: Roompot–Nederlandse Loterij
- 2018: Ningxia Sports Lottery–Livall Cycling Team
- 2019: Taiyuan Miogee Cycling Team

Tim Ariesen (born 20 March 1994) is a Dutch former racing cyclist, who rode professionally between 2014 and 2019 for five different teams.

== Major results ==
2015
1st Overall Carpathian Couriers Race

1st Sprints classification

1st Grand Prix des Marbriers
4th Schaal Sels
6th Overall Tour de Gironde

1st Young rider classification

6th Antwerpse Havenpijl
2016
2nd Road race, National Under-23 Road Championships
9th Grand Prix des Marbriers
2017
10th Dorpenomloop Rucphen
2018
6th Ronde van Overijssel
8th Classic Loire-Atlantique
