= Fabio Jakobsen =

Dutch cyclist (Gorinchem, 31 August 1996)

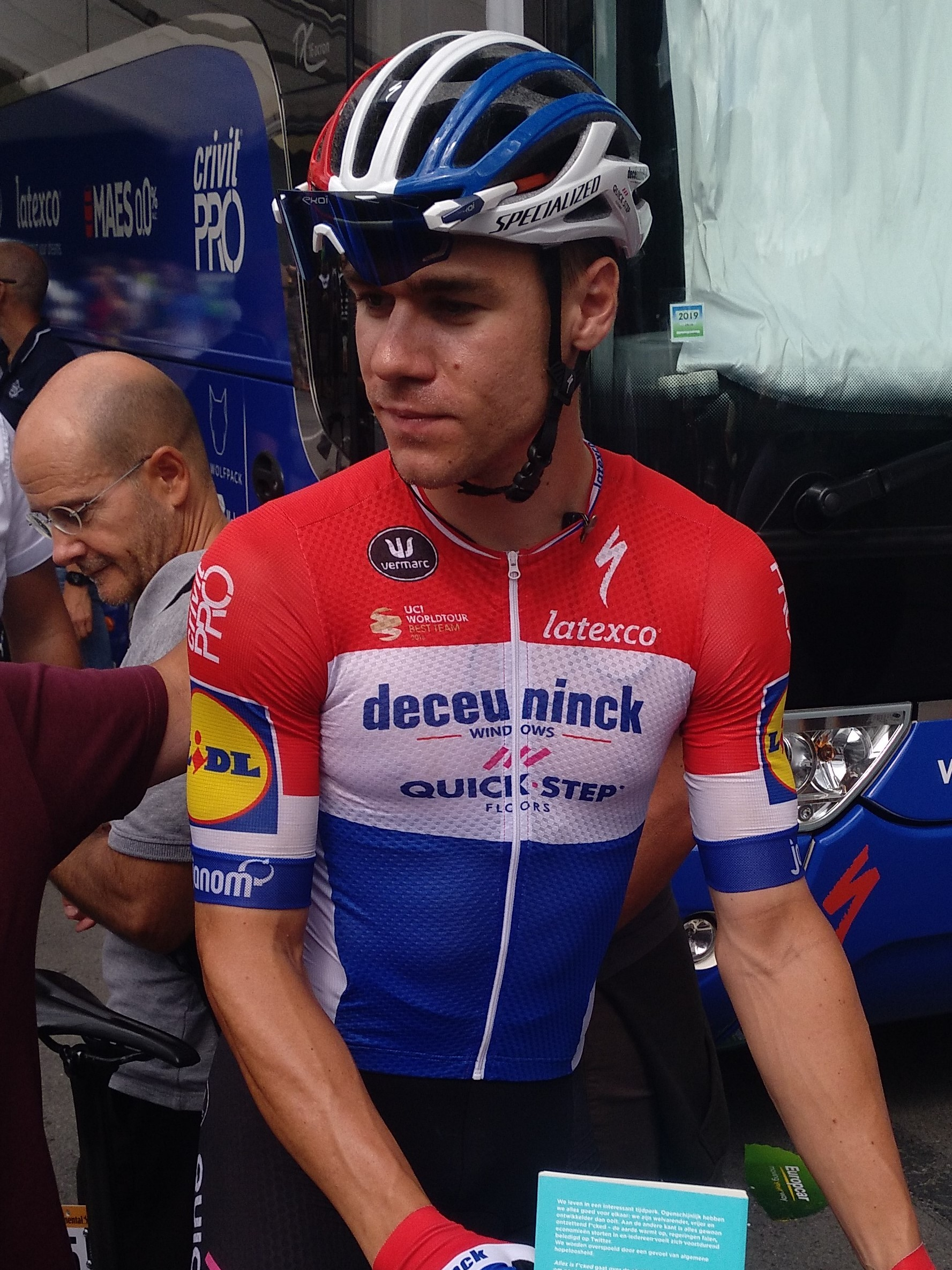
- Jakobsen at 2019 Vuelta a España

Personal information
- Full name: Fabio Jakobsen
- Born: 31 August 1996 (age 30) Gorinchem, Netherlands
- Height: 1.81 m (5 ft 11 in)
- Weight: 78 kg (172 lb)

Cycling career
- Sport: Cycling
- Current team: Visma–Lease a Bike
- Discipline: Road
- Role: Rider
- Rider type: Sprinter

Professional teams
- 2015–2017: SEG Racing
- 2018–2023: Quick-Step Floors
- 2024–2026: Team dsm–firmenich PostNL
- 2026-: Visma–Lease a Bike

Major wins
- Grand Tours Tour de France 1 individual stage (2022) Vuelta a España Points classification (2021) 5 individual stages (2019, 2021) Single-day races and Classics European Road Race Championships (2022) National Road Race Championships (2019) Scheldeprijs (2018, 2019) Kuurne–Brussels–Kuurne (2022) Eurométropole Tour (2021) Nokere Koerse (2018)
Medal record
Men's road bicycle racing
Representing the Netherlands
European Championships
Gold medal – first place	2022 Munich	Road race

Fabio Jakobsen (born 31 August 1996) is a Dutch cyclist, who currently rides for UCI WorldTeam Visma–Lease a Bike.

== Career ==
=== 2019–2020 ===
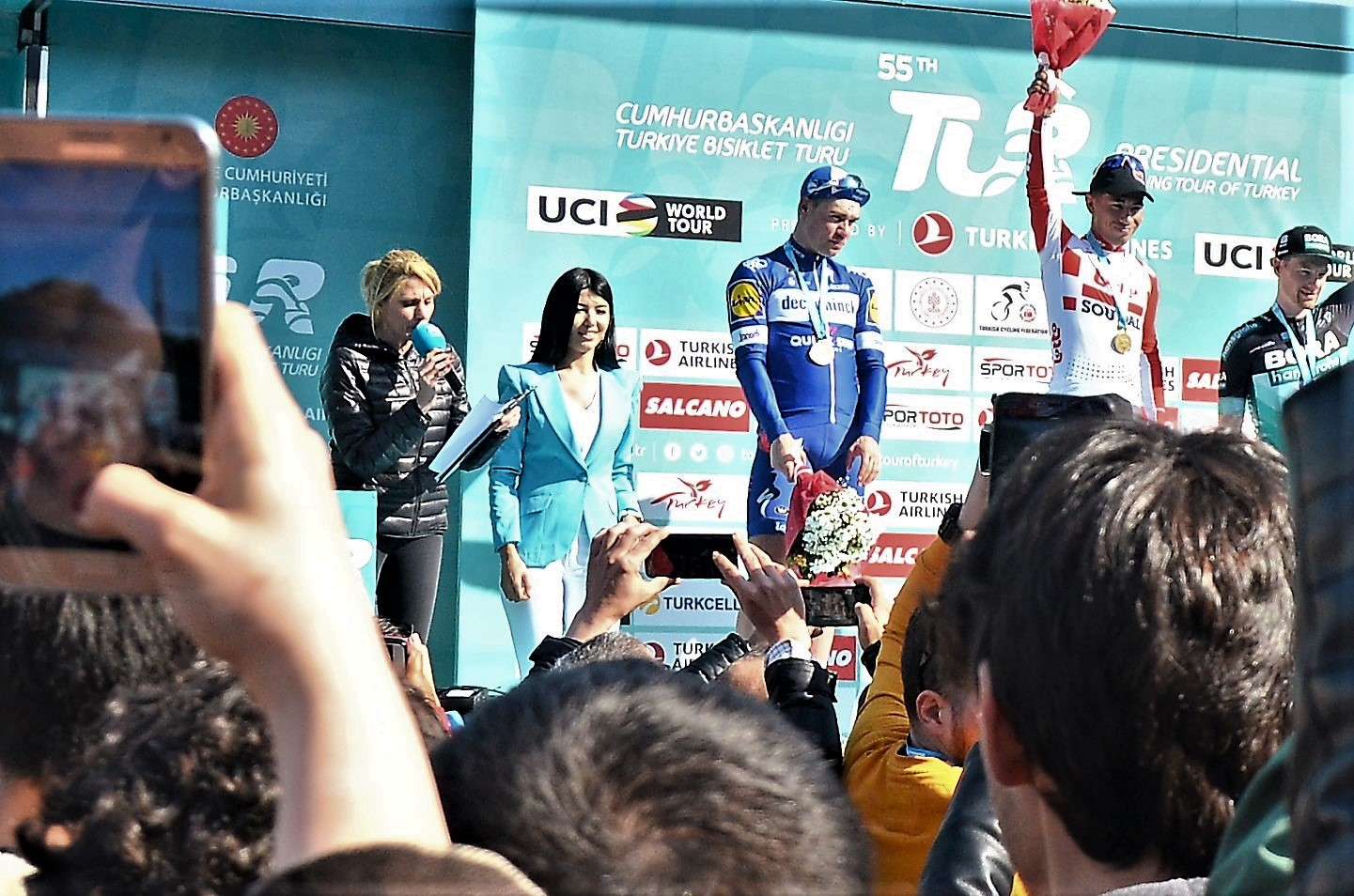
Fabio Jakobsen of Deceuninck–Quick-Step (left), runner-up of the Stage 6 (Sakarya-Istanbul) at the 55th Presidential Cycling Tour of Turkey 2019 at the award ceremony.

During the 2019 Vuelta a España Jakobsen won two stages, including the final stage of the race on stage 21 in Madrid.

A few metres before the finish of the 1st stage in the 2020 Tour de Pologne he heavily crashed after Dylan Groenewegen deviated from his line, forcing Jakobsen into the barriers. The race doctor initially reported that Jakobsen had suffered several major injuries, including serious brain trauma and damage to the upper respiratory tract, a broken palate, and heavy blood loss, and was in life-threatening condition. On 7 August 2020, the race organisers announced that Jakobsen was out of the induced coma and in "good condition". On 18 August 2020, Jakobsen said that he was "glad to be alive" following the crash. Groenewegen received a nine-month suspension.

=== 2021–present ===
Jakobsen returned to professional racing at the Presidential Tour of Turkey on 11 April 2021, eight months after the crash.

Jakobsen raced the 2021 Vuelta a España, where he improved on his 2019 result by winning three stages on this occasion: stages four, eight and sixteen. The early part of the race saw him battle with Jasper Philipsen for the green Points Classification jersey. Philipsen abandoned the race after stage 10 due to illness, which left Magnus Cort and overall GC contender Primož Roglič as Jakobsen's closest points rivals. However, stage 16 proved to be decisive, when Jakobsen won the sprint finish on his 25th birthday. Although he was unable to increase his points total following this stage victory, he remained the overall leader in the points competition until the completion of the race, earning him his first Grand Tour jersey.

At the end of the 2021 season, Jakobsen was nominated for Comeback Rider of the Year award on CyclingnewsForum. Jakobsen won the award, gaining the majority of the votes over the other nine riders.

In 2022 he won Kuurne-Brussels-Kuurne, a stage in Paris-Nice and the Tour of Belgium. He also won the points classification as well as multiple stages in Volta ao Algarve, the Tour of Hungary and Volta a la Comunitat Valenciana. In the 2022 Tour de France, which was his first entry in the Tour, he won the sprint finish on stage 2. On stage 17, which was a major mountain stage with a summit finish in Peyragudes, Jakobsen's entire team returned to the finish line to cheer when they realized he was going to make it inside the time cut. He was the final surviving rider to cross the finish line, and then collapsed up against the barriers with the Broom wagon driving across the line fifteen seconds later. He survived the next day in the high mountains and the rest of the race, however a mechanical problem on the last hundred meters of the Champs-Élysées stage didn't allow him to compete in the sprint. His overall result were still positive, making his first Tour de France a successful one.

== Major results ==
2014
4th Overall Driedaagse van Axel
2015
2nd Road race, National Under-23 Road Championships
2016
1st Road race, National Under-23 Road Championships
1st Slag om Norg
1st Stage 2 ZLM Tour
2017
1st Road race, National Under-23 Road Championships
1st Eschborn-Frankfurt City Loop U23
1st Craft Ster van Zwolle
1st Ronde van Noord-Holland
Olympia's Tour

1st Stages 3 & 4

1st Stage 2 Tour de l'Avenir
1st Stage 2 Tour de Normandie
1st Stage 4 Tour Alsace
2nd Dorpenomloop Rucphen
4th Arno Wallaard Memorial
5th Slag om Norg
6th Road race, UEC European Under-23 Road Championships
8th Zuid Oost Drenthe Classic
2018 (7 pro wins)
1st Scheldeprijs
1st Nokere Koerse
Tour of Guangxi

1st Points classification
1st Stages 3 & 6

1st Stage 1 BinckBank Tour
1st Stage 1 Tour des Fjords
1st Stage 4 Okolo Slovenska
2nd Halle–Ingooigem
4th Dwars door West–Vlaanderen
6th Great War Remembrance Race
10th Bretagne Classic
2019 (7)
1st Road race, National Road Championships
1st Scheldeprijs
Vuelta a España

1st Stages 4 & 21

1st Stage 1 Volta ao Algarve
1st Stage 3 Tour of Turkey
1st Stage 4 Tour of California
2nd Elfstedenronde
2020 (4)
1st Grote Prijs Jean-Pierre Monseré
Volta ao Algarve

1st Points classification
1st Stage 1

1st Stage 1 Tour de Pologne
1st Stage 5 Volta a la Comunitat Valenciana
4th Kuurne–Brussels–Kuurne
2021 (7)
1st Eurométropole Tour
1st Gooikse Pijl
Vuelta a España

1st Points classification
1st Stages 4, 8 & 16

Tour de Wallonie

1st Stages 2 & 5

2022 (13)
1st Road race, UEC European Road Championships
1st Kampioenschap van Vlaanderen
1st Kuurne–Brussels–Kuurne
1st Elfstedenronde
Volta a la Comunitat Valenciana

1st Points classification
1st Stages 2 & 5

Volta ao Algarve

1st Points classification
1st Stages 1 & 3

Tour de Hongrie

1st Points classification
1st Stage 2 & 3

1st Stage 2 Tour de France
1st Stage 2 Paris–Nice
1st Stage 5 Tour of Belgium
6th Münsterland Giro
2023 (7)
Tour of Belgium

1st Stages 2 & 5

Danmark Rundt

1st Stages 2 & 4

1st Stage 2 Tirreno–Adriatico
1st Stage 2 Tour de Hongrie
1st Stage 2 Vuelta a San Juan
3rd Elfstedenronde
3rd Kampioenschap van Vlaanderen
5th Classic Brugge–De Panne
6th Gooikse Pijl
9th Kuurne–Brussels–Kuurne
2024 (1)
1st Stage 1 Tour of Turkey
2nd Nokere Koerse
7th Omloop van het Houtland

=== Grand Tour general classification results timeline ===
Grand Tour	2019	2020	2021	2022	2023	2024
Giro d'Italia	—	—	—	—	—	DNF
Tour de France	—	—	—	129	DNF	DNF
Vuelta a España	145	—	141	—	—	—

Legend
—	Did not compete
DNF	Did not finish
