= 2022 Kuurne–Brussels–Kuurne =

2022 UCI ProSeries

Race details
- Dates: 27 February 2022
- Stages: 1
- Distance: 195.1 km (121.2 mi)
- Winning time: 4h 32' 13"

Results
	Winner	Fabio Jakobsen (NED)	(Quick-Step Alpha Vinyl Team)
	Second	Caleb Ewan (AUS)	(Lotto–Soudal)
	Third	Hugo Hofstetter (FRA)	(Arkéa–Samsic)

The 2022 Kuurne–Brussels–Kuurne was the 74th edition of the Kuurne–Brussels–Kuurne cycling classic. It was held on 27 February 2022 as a category 1.Pro race on the 2022 UCI ProSeries. The race was 195.1 km (121.2 mi) long, starting and finishing in Kuurne, and featured several cobbled sections and climbs. The race formed the latter half of the opening weekend of the Belgian road cycling season with UCI WorldTour race Omloop Het Nieuwsblad held the previous day.

== Teams ==
Seventeen of the eighteen UCI WorldTeams along with eight UCI ProTeams formed the twenty-five teams that participated in the race. 136 riders finished the race.

UCI WorldTeams

- AG2R Citroën Team
- Bora–Hansgrohe
- Cofidis
- EF Education–EasyPost
- Groupama–FDJ
- Ineos Grenadiers
- Intermarché–Wanty–Gobert Matériaux
- Israel–Premier Tech
- Lotto–Soudal
- Movistar Team
- Quick-Step Alpha Vinyl Team
- Team Bahrain Victorious
- Team BikeExchange–Jayco
- Team DSM
- Team Jumbo–Visma
- Trek–Segafredo
- UAE Team Emirates

UCI ProTeams

- Alpecin–Fenix
- Arkéa–Samsic
- B&B Hotels–KTM
- Bingoal Pauwels Sauces WB
- Human Powered Health
- Sport Vlaanderen–Baloise
- Team TotalEnergies
- Uno-X Pro Cycling Team

== Result ==
Result
Rank	Rider	Team	Time
1	Fabio Jakobsen (NED)	Quick-Step Alpha Vinyl Team	4h 37' 08"
2	Caleb Ewan (AUS)	Lotto–Soudal	+ 0"
3	Hugo Hofstetter (FRA)	Arkéa–Samsic	+ 0"
4	Daniel McLay (GBR)	Arkéa–Samsic	+ 0"
5	Giacomo Nizzolo (ITA)	Israel–Premier Tech	+ 0"
6	Dries Van Gestel (BEL)	Team TotalEnergies	+ 0"
7	Amaury Capiot (BEL)	Arkéa–Samsic	+ 0"
8	Christophe Laporte (FRA)	Team Jumbo–Visma	+ 0"
9	Matteo Trentin (ITA)	UAE Team Emirates	+ 0"
10	Taco van der Hoorn (NED)	Intermarché–Wanty–Gobert Matériaux	+ 0"
