= 2019 Scheldeprijs =

2019 UCI Europe Tour
- Event poster with previous winner Fabio Jakobsen

Race details
- Dates: 10 April 2019
- Stages: 1
- Distance: 202.3 km (125.7 mi)
- Winning time: 4h 26' 29"

Results
	Winner	Fabio Jakobsen (NED)	(Deceuninck–Quick-Step)
	Second	Max Walscheid (GER)	(Team Sunweb)
	Third	Christopher Lawless (GBR)	(Team Sky)

The 2019 Scheldeprijs was the 107th edition of the Scheldeprijs road cycling one day race, held on 10 April 2019 as part of the 2019 UCI Europe Tour, as a 1.HC categorised race.

== Teams ==
Twenty-one teams were invited to start the race. These included ten UCI WorldTeams and eleven UCI Professional Continental teams.

UCI WorldTeams

- Bora–Hansgrohe
- Team Dimension Data
- Team Katusha–Alpecin
- Lotto–Soudal
- Deceuninck–Quick-Step
- Trek–Segafredo
- UAE Team Emirates
- EF Education First
- Team Sunweb
- Team Sky

UCI Professional Continental teams

- Cofidis
- Corendon–Circus
- Arkéa–Samsic
- Wallonie Bruxelles
- Riwal Readynez
- Roompot–Charles
- Israel Cycling Academy
- Sport Vlaanderen–Baloise
- Wanty–Gobert
- Vital Concept–B&B Hotels
- Direct Énergie

== Result ==
Result
Rank	Rider	Team	Time
1	Fabio Jakobsen (NED)	Deceuninck–Quick-Step	4h 26' 29"
2	Max Walscheid (GER)	Team Sunweb	+ 0"
3	Chris Lawless (GBR)	Team Sky	+ 0"
4	Hugo Hofstetter (FRA)	Cofidis	+ 0"
5	Roy Jans (BEL)	Corendon–Circus	+ 0"
6	Kris Boeckmans (BEL)	Vital Concept–B&B Hotels	+ 0"
7	Marco Haller (AUT)	Team Katusha–Alpecin	+ 0"
8	Emīls Liepiņš (LAT)	Wallonie Bruxelles	+ 0"
9	Jasper Philipsen (BEL)	UAE Team Emirates	+ 0"
10	Matteo Moschetti (ITA)	Trek–Segafredo	+ 0"
