= 2018 BinckBank Tour =

Cycling race

2018 UCI World Tour, race 29 of 37

Race details
- Dates: 13–19 August 2018
- Stages: 7
- Distance: 1,122.4 km (697.4 mi)
- Winning time: 25h 13' 01"

Results
Jersey awarded to the overall winner	Winner	Matej Mohorič (SLO)	(Bahrain–Merida)
	Second	Michael Matthews (AUS)	(Team Sunweb)
	Third	Tim Wellens (BEL)	(Lotto–Soudal)
Jersey awarded to the points classification winner	Points	Zdeněk Štybar (CZE)	(Quick-Step Floors)
Jersey awarded to the combativity classification winner	Combativity	Elmar Reinders (NED)	(Roompot–Nederlandse Loterij)
	Team	Quick-Step Floors	

The 2018 BinckBank Tour was a road cycling stage race that took place between 13 and 19 August 2018 in Belgium and the Netherlands. It was the 14th edition of the BinckBank Tour and the twenty-ninth event of the 2018 UCI World Tour. The stage race was won by the Slovenian Matej Mohorič.

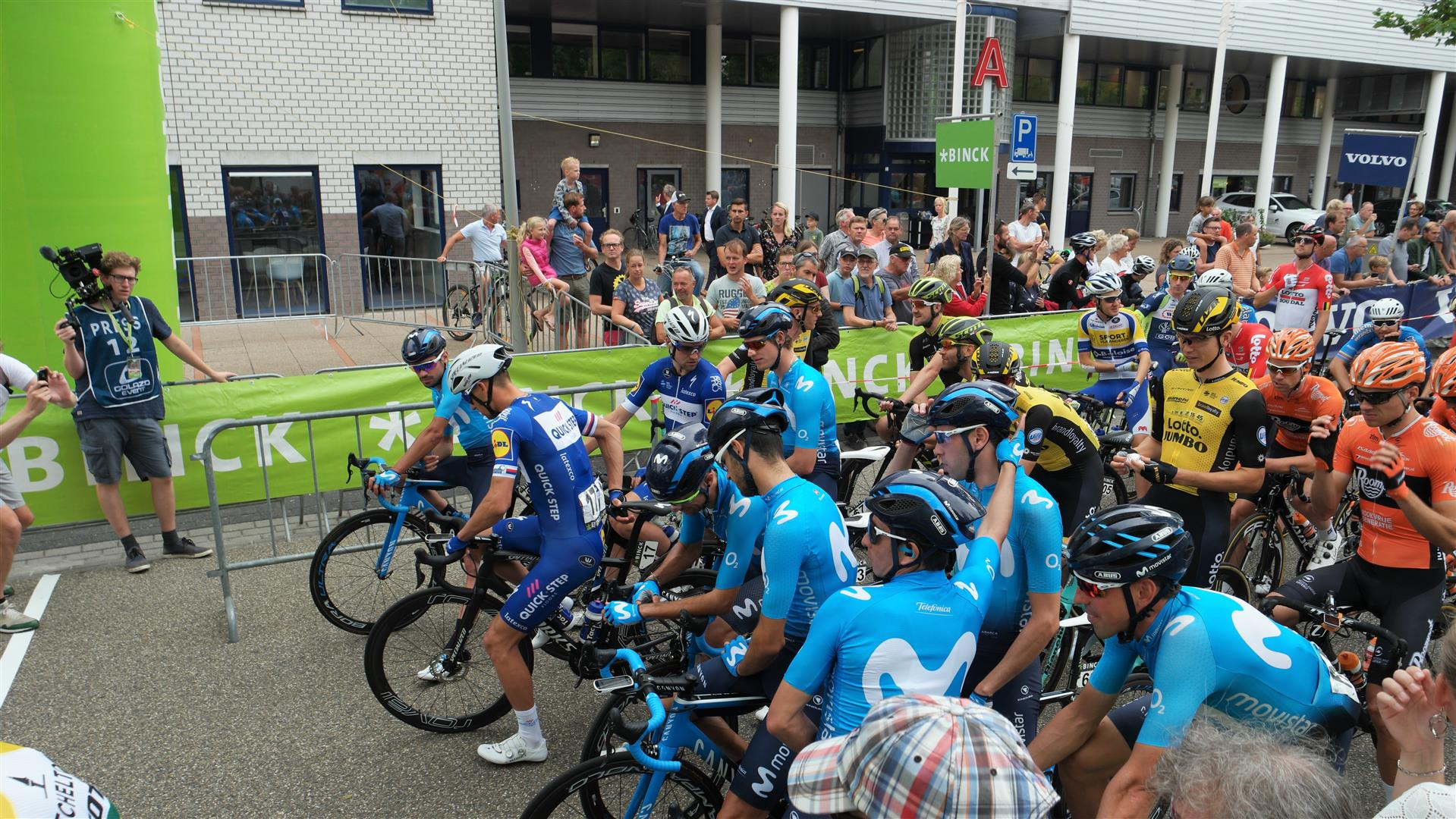
The start on Stage 1 in Heerenveen

== Teams ==
All UCI WorldTeam were invited as the race is part of the UCI World Tour. The race organisation also gave out wildcards to five UCI Professional Continental teams.

UCI WorldTeams

- AG2R La Mondiale
- Astana
- Bahrain–Merida
- BMC Racing Team
- Bora–Hansgrohe
- EF Education First–Drapac p/b Cannondale
- LottoNL–Jumbo
- Lotto–Soudal
- Mitchelton–BikeExchange
- Movistar Team
- Quick-Step Floors
- Team Dimension Data
- Team Katusha–Alpecin
- Team Sky
- Team Sunweb
- Trek–Segafredo
- UAE Team Emirates
- Groupama–FDJ

Professional Continental teams

- Roompot–Nederlandse Loterij
- Sport Vlaanderen–Baloise
- Vérandas Willems–Crelan
- Wanty–Groupe Gobert
- WB Aqua Protect Veranclassic

== Schedule ==
The course for the race was announced in February 2018.

Stage	Date	Route	Distance	Type	Winner
1	13 August	Heerenveen (Netherlands) to Bolsward (Netherlands)	177.3 km (110 mi)	Flat stage	Fabio Jakobsen (NED)
2	14 August	Venray (Netherlands) to Venray (Netherlands)	12.7 km (8 mi)	Individual time trial	Stefan Küng (SUI)
3	15 August	Aalter (Belgium) to Antwerp (Belgium)	166.0 km (103 mi)	Flat stage	Taco van der Hoorn (NED)
4	16 August	Blankenberge (Belgium) to Ardooie (Belgium)	165.5 km (103 mi)	Flat stage	Jasper Stuyven (BEL)
5	17 August	Sint-Pieters-Leeuw (Belgium) to Lanaken (Belgium)	209.2 km (130 mi)	Flat stage	Magnus Cort (DEN)
6	18 August	Riemst (Belgium) to Sittard-Geleen (Netherlands)	182.2 km (113 mi)	Hilly stage	Gregor Mühlberger (AUT)
7	19 August	Eau d'Heure lakes (Belgium) to Geraardsbergen (Belgium)	209.5 km (130 mi)	Hilly stage	Michael Matthews (AUS)

== Stages ==
=== Stage 1 ===
13 August 2018 – Heerenveen to Bolsward, 177.3 km (110.2 mi)

Stage 1 result
Rank	Rider	Team	Time
1	Fabio Jakobsen (NED)	Quick-Step Floors	4h 01' 00"
2	Marcel Kittel (GER)	Team Katusha–Alpecin	+ 0"
3	Caleb Ewan (AUS)	Mitchelton–BikeExchange	+ 0"
4	Kristoffer Halvorsen (NOR)	Team Sky	+ 0"
5	Max Walscheid (GER)	Team Sunweb	+ 0"
6	Dylan Groenewegen (NED)	LottoNL–Jumbo	+ 0"
7	Matteo Pelucchi (ITA)	Bora–Hansgrohe	+ 0"
8	Timothy Dupont (BEL)	Wanty–Groupe Gobert	+ 0"
9	Jasper Stuyven (BEL)	Trek–Segafredo	+ 0"
10	Riccardo Minali (ITA)	Astana	+ 0"

General classification after Stage 1
Rank	Rider	Team	Time
1	Fabio Jakobsen (NED)	Quick-Step Floors	4h 00' 50"
2	Marcel Kittel (GER)	Team Katusha–Alpecin	+ 4"
3	Elmar Reinders (NED)	Roompot–Nederlandse Loterij	+ 5"
4	Dries De Bondt (BEL)	Vérandas Willems–Crelan	+ 5"
5	Caleb Ewan (AUS)	Mitchelton–BikeExchange	+ 6"
6	Manuele Boaro (ITA)	Bahrain–Merida	+ 7"
7	Dimitri Peyskens (BEL)	WB Aqua Protect Veranclassic	+ 7"
8	Matej Mohorič (SLO)	Bahrain–Merida	+ 9"
9	Thomas Sprengers (BEL)	Sport Vlaanderen–Baloise	+ 9"
10	Kristoffer Halvorsen (NOR)	Team Sky	+ 10"

=== Stage 2 ===
14 August 2018 – Venray, 12.7 km (7.9 mi), individual time trial (ITT)

Stage 2 result
Rank	Rider	Team	Time
1	Stefan Küng (SUI)	BMC Racing Team	14' 11"
2	Victor Campenaerts (BEL)	Lotto–Soudal	+ 14"
3	Søren Kragh Andersen (DEN)	Team Sunweb	+ 15"
4	Michael Matthews (AUS)	Team Sunweb	+ 15"
5	Maximilian Schachmann (GER)	Quick-Step Floors	+ 19"
6	Alex Dowsett (GBR)	Team Katusha–Alpecin	+ 19"
7	Luke Durbridge (AUS)	Mitchelton–BikeExchange	+ 20"
8	Miles Scotson (AUS)	BMC Racing Team	+ 22"
9	Maciej Bodnar (POL)	Bora–Hansgrohe	+ 23"
10	Yves Lampaert (BEL)	Quick-Step Floors	+ 23"

General classification after Stage 2
Rank	Rider	Team	Time
1	Stefan Küng (SUI)	BMC Racing Team	4h 15' 11"
2	Victor Campenaerts (BEL)	Lotto–Soudal	+ 14"
3	Søren Kragh Andersen (DEN)	Team Sunweb	+ 15"
4	Michael Matthews (AUS)	Team Sunweb	+ 15"
5	Maximilian Schachmann (GER)	Quick-Step Floors	+ 19"
6	Alex Dowsett (GBR)	Team Katusha–Alpecin	+ 19"
7	Luke Durbridge (AUS)	Mitchelton–BikeExchange	+ 20"
8	Miles Scotson (AUS)	BMC Racing Team	+ 22"
9	Maciej Bodnar (POL)	Bora–Hansgrohe	+ 23"
10	Yves Lampaert (BEL)	Quick-Step Floors	+ 23"

=== Stage 3 ===
15 August 2018 – Aalter to Antwerp, 166.0 km (103.1 mi)

Stage 3 result
Rank	Rider	Team	Time
1	Taco van der Hoorn (NED)	Roompot–Nederlandse Loterij	3h 47' 42"
2	Maxime Vantomme (BEL)	WB Aqua Protect Veranclassic	+ 3"
3	Sean De Bie (BEL)	Vérandas Willems–Crelan	+ 3"
4	Matej Mohorič (SLO)	Bahrain–Merida	+ 3"
5	Jesper Asselman (NED)	Roompot–Nederlandse Loterij	+ 35"
6	Dylan Groenewegen (NED)	LottoNL–Jumbo	+ 1' 11"
7	Rüdiger Selig (GER)	Bora–Hansgrohe	+ 1' 11"
8	Fabio Jakobsen (NED)	Quick-Step Floors	+ 1' 11"
9	Max Walscheid (GER)	Team Sunweb	+ 1' 11"
10	Tom Van Asbroeck (BEL)	EF Education First–Drapac p/b Cannondale	+ 1' 11"

General classification after Stage 3
Rank	Rider	Team	Time
1	Matej Mohorič (SLO)	Bahrain–Merida	8h 03' 45"
2	Sean De Bie (BEL)	Vérandas Willems–Crelan	+ 1"
3	Stefan Küng (SUI)	BMC Racing Team	+ 19"
4	Maxime Vantomme (BEL)	WB Aqua Protect Veranclassic	+ 25"
5	Taco van der Hoorn (NED)	Roompot–Nederlandse Loterij	+ 31"
6	Victor Campenaerts (BEL)	Lotto–Soudal	+ 33"
7	Søren Kragh Andersen (DEN)	Team Sunweb	+ 34"
8	Michael Matthews (AUS)	Team Sunweb	+ 34"
9	Maximilian Schachmann (GER)	Quick-Step Floors	+ 38"
10	Alex Dowsett (GBR)	Team Katusha–Alpecin	+ 38"

=== Stage 4 ===
16 August 2018 – Blankenberge to Ardooie, 165.5 km (102.8 mi)

Stage 4 result
Rank	Rider	Team	Time
1	Jasper Stuyven (BEL)	Trek–Segafredo	3h 44' 46"
2	Caleb Ewan (AUS)	Mitchelton–Scott	+ 0"
3	Zdeněk Štybar (CZE)	Quick-Step Floors	+ 0"
4	Rüdiger Selig (GER)	Bora–Hansgrohe	+ 0"
5	Timothy Dupont (BEL)	Wanty–Groupe Gobert	+ 0"
6	Jempy Drucker (LUX)	BMC Racing Team	+ 0"
7	Ryan Gibbons (RSA)	Team Dimension Data	+ 0"
8	Tom van Asbroeck (BEL)	EF Education First–Drapac p/b Cannondale	+ 0"
9	Daniel Hoelgaard (NOR)	Groupama–FDJ	+ 0"
10	Dylan Groenewegen (NED)	LottoNL–Jumbo	+ 0"

General classification after Stage 4
Rank	Rider	Team	Time
1	Matej Mohorič (SLO)	Bahrain–Merida	11h 48' 28"
2	Sean De Bie (BEL)	Vérandas Willems–Crelan	+ 3"
3	Stefan Küng (SUI)	BMC Racing Team	+ 22"
4	Maxime Vantomme (BEL)	WB Aqua Protect Veranclassic	+ 28"
5	Michael Matthews (AUS)	Team Sunweb	+ 31"
6	Taco van der Hoorn (NED)	Roompot–Nederlandse Loterij	+ 32"
7	Victor Campenaerts (BEL)	Lotto–Soudal	+ 36"
8	Søren Kragh Andersen (DEN)	Team Sunweb	+ 37"
9	Maximilian Schachmann (GER)	Quick-Step Floors	+ 41"
10	Alex Dowsett (GBR)	Team Katusha–Alpecin	+ 41"

=== Stage 5 ===
17 August 2018 – Sint-Pieters-Leeuw to Lanaken, 209.2 km (130.0 mi)

Stage 5 result
Rank	Rider	Team	Time
1	Magnus Cort (DEN)	Astana	4h 39' 50"
2	Julius van den Berg (NED)	EF Education First–Drapac p/b Cannondale	+ 0"
3	Alexis Gougeard (FRA)	AG2R La Mondiale	+ 0"
4	Jonas Rickaert (BEL)	Sport Vlaanderen–Baloise	+ 29"
5	Caleb Ewan (AUS)	Mitchelton–Scott	+ 33"
6	Matteo Pelucchi (ITA)	Bora–Hansgrohe	+ 33"
7	Florian Senechal (FRA)	Quick-Step Floors	+ 33"
8	Tom Devriendt (BEL)	Wanty–Groupe Gobert	+ 33"
9	Jens Debusschere (BEL)	Lotto–Soudal	+ 33"
10	Matej Mohorič (SLO)	Bahrain–Merida	+ 33"

General classification after Stage 5
Rank	Rider	Team	Time
1	Matej Mohorič (SLO)	Bahrain–Merida	16h 28' 51"
2	Sean De Bie (BEL)	Vérandas Willems–Crelan	+ 3"
3	Stefan Küng (SUI)	BMC Racing Team	+ 22"
4	Maxime Vantomme (BEL)	WB Aqua Protect Veranclassic	+ 28"
5	Michael Matthews (AUS)	Team Sunweb	+ 30"
6	Taco van der Hoorn (NED)	Roompot–Nederlandse Loterij	+ 32"
7	Victor Campenaerts (BEL)	Lotto–Soudal	+ 36"
8	Søren Kragh Andersen (DEN)	Team Sunweb	+ 37"
9	Maximilian Schachmann (GER)	Quick-Step Floors	+ 41"
10	Alex Dowsett (GBR)	Team Katusha–Alpecin	+ 41"

=== Stage 6 ===
18 August 2018 – Riemst to Sittard-Geleen, 182.2 km (113.2 mi)

Stage 6 result
Rank	Rider	Team	Time
1	Gregor Mühlberger (AUT)	Bora–Hansgrohe	4h 05' 10"
2	Tim Wellens (BEL)	Lotto–Soudal	+ 3"
3	Zdeněk Štybar (CZE)	Quick-Step Floors	+ 3"
4	Dylan van Baarle (NED)	Team Sky	+ 3"
5	Maximilian Schachmann (GER)	Quick-Step Floors	+ 5"
6	Greg Van Avermaet (BEL)	BMC Racing Team	+ 8"
7	Søren Kragh Andersen (DEN)	Team Sunweb	+ 8"
8	Oliver Naesen (BEL)	AG2R La Mondiale	+ 11"
9	Jay McCarthy (AUS)	Bora–Hansgrohe	+ 11"
10	Mads Würtz Schmidt (DEN)	Team Katusha–Alpecin	+ 11"

General classification after Stage 6
Rank	Rider	Team	Time
1	Matej Mohorič (SLO)	Bahrain–Merida	20h 34' 12"
2	Michael Matthews (AUS)	Team Sunweb	+ 30"
3	Taco van der Hoorn (NED)	Roompot–Nederlandse Loterij	+ 32"
4	Søren Kragh Andersen (DEN)	Team Sunweb	+ 34"
5	Maximilian Schachmann (GER)	Quick-Step Floors	+ 35"
6	Maciej Bodnar (POL)	Bora–Hansgrohe	+ 36"
7	Victor Campenaerts (BEL)	Lotto–Soudal	+ 36"
8	Tim Wellens (BEL)	Lotto–Soudal	+ 37"
9	Yves Lampaert (BEL)	Quick-Step Floors	+ 43"
10	Dylan van Baarle (NED)	Team Sky	+ 44"

=== Stage 7 ===
19 August 2018 – Eau d'Heure lakes to Geraardsbergen, 209.5 km (130.2 mi)

Stage 7 result
Rank	Rider	Team	Time
1	Michael Matthews (AUS)	Team Sunweb	4h 38' 36"
2	Greg Van Avermaet (BEL)	BMC Racing Team	+ 1"
3	Zdeněk Štybar (CZE)	Quick-Step Floors	+ 3"
4	Oliver Naesen (BEL)	AG2R La Mondiale	+ 3"
5	Maximilian Schachmann (GER)	Quick-Step Floors	+ 3"
6	Tim Wellens (BEL)	Lotto–Intermarché	+ 3"
7	Dion Smith (NZL)	Wanty–Groupe Gobert	+ 3"
8	Niki Terpstra (NED)	Quick-Step Floors	+ 3"
9	Dylan Van Baarle (NED)	Team Sky	+ 3"
10	Jan Polanc (SLO)	UAE Team Emirates	+ 7"

General classification after Stage 7
Rank	Rider	Team	Time
1	Matej Mohorič (SLO)	Bahrain–Merida	25h 13' 01"
2	Michael Matthews (AUS)	Team Sunweb	+ 5"
3	Tim Wellens (BEL)	Lotto–Soudal	+ 20"
4	Maximilian Schachmann (GER)	Quick-Step Floors	+ 25"
5	Dylan van Baarle (NED)	Team Sky	+ 34"
6	Greg Van Avermaet (BEL)	BMC Racing Team	+ 37"
7	Søren Kragh Andersen (DEN)	Team Sunweb	+ 39"
8	Gregor Mühlberger (AUT)	Bora–Hansgrohe	+ 43"
9	Niki Terpstra (NED)	Quick-Step Floors	+ 43"
10	Jasper Stuyven (BEL)	Trek–Segafredo	+ 50"

== Classification leadership table ==
There are four principal classifications in the race. The first of these is the general classification, calculated by adding up the time each rider took to ride each stage. Time bonuses are applied for winning stages (10, 6 and 4 seconds to the first three riders) and for the three "golden kilometre" sprints on each stage. At each of these sprints, the first three riders are given 3-, 2- and 1-second bonuses respectively. The rider with the lowest cumulative time is the winner of the general classification. The rider leading the classification wins a green jersey.

There is also a points classification. On each road stage the riders are awarded points for finishing in the top 10 places, with other points awarded for intermediate sprints. The rider with the most accumulated points is the leader of the classification and wins the red jersey. The combativity classification is based solely on points won at the intermediate sprints; the leading rider wins the black jersey. The final classification is a team classification: on each stage the times of the best three riders on each team are added up. The team with the lowest cumulative time over the seven stages wins the team classification.

Stage	Winner	General classification	Points classification	Combativity classification	Team classification
1	Fabio Jakobsen	Fabio Jakobsen	Fabio Jakobsen	Dries De Bondt	Quick-Step Floors
2	Stefan Küng	Stefan Küng	Stefan Küng	Dries De Bondt	BMC Racing Team
3	Taco van der Hoorn	Matej Mohorič	Fabio Jakobsen	Taco van der Hoorn	BMC Racing Team
4	Jasper Stuyven	Matej Mohorič	Caleb Ewan	Elmar Reinders	BMC Racing Team
5	Magnus Cort	Matej Mohorič	Caleb Ewan	Dries De Bondt	BMC Racing Team
6	Gregor Mühlberger	Matej Mohorič	Caleb Ewan	Elmar Reinders	Quick-Step Floors
7	Michael Matthews	Matej Mohorič	Zdeněk Štybar	Elmar Reinders	Quick-Step Floors
Final		Matej Mohorič	Zdeněk Štybar	Elmar Reinders	Quick-Step Floors
