= 2018 Scheldeprijs =

2018 UCI Europe Tour
- Event poster with previous winner Marcel Kittel

Race details
- Dates: 4 April 2018
- Stages: 1
- Distance: 200.4 km (124.5 mi)
- Winning time: 4h 23' 51"

Results
	Winner	Fabio Jakobsen (NED)	(Quick-Step Floors)
	Second	Pascal Ackermann (GER)	(Bora–Hansgrohe)
	Third	Christopher Lawless (GBR)	(Team Sky)

The 2018 Scheldeprijs was the 106th edition of the Scheldeprijs road cycling one day race, held on 4 April 2017 as part of the 2018 UCI Europe Tour, as a 1.HC categorised race. More than thirty riders were disqualified from the race, after going through a level crossing that was closing.

== General classification ==
Final general classification

Rank	Rider	Team	Time
1	Fabio Jakobsen (NED)	Quick-Step Floors	4h 23' 51"
2	Pascal Ackermann (GER)	Bora–Hansgrohe	+ 0"
3	Chris Lawless (GBR)	Team Sky	+ 0"
4	Jens Debusschere (BEL)	Lotto–Soudal	+ 0"
5	Jérémy Lecroq (FRA)	Vital Concept	+ 0"
6	Max Walscheid (GER)	Team Sunweb	+ 0"
7	Timothy Dupont (BEL)	Wanty–Groupe Gobert	+ 0"
8	Jonas Rickaert (BEL)	Sport Vlaanderen–Baloise	+ 0"
9	Bram Welten (NED)	Fortuneo–Samsic	+ 0"
10	Marco Haller (AUT)	Team Katusha–Alpecin	+ 0"
