= 2018 Three Days of Bruges–De Panne =

2018 UCI Europe Tour

Race details
- Dates: 21 March 2018
- Stages: 1
- Distance: 202.4 km (125.8 mi)
- Winning time: 4h 41' 08"

Results
	Winner	Elia Viviani (ITA)
	Second	Pascal Ackermann (GER)
	Third	Jasper Philipsen (BEL)

The 2018 Three Days of De Panne (Dutch: Driedaagse De Panne–Koksijde) was the 42nd edition of the Three Days of De Panne cycle race. The race took place on 21 March 2018, between Bruges and De Panne. It was part of the 2018 UCI Europe Tour calendar in category 1.HC. The race was won by Elia Viviani.

== General classification ==
Final general classification

Rank	Rider	Time
1	Elia Viviani (ITA)	4h 41' 08"
2	Pascal Ackermann (GER)	s.t.
3	Jasper Philipsen (BEL)	s.t.
4	Baptiste Planckaert (BEL)	s.t.
5	Jens Debusschere (BEL)	s.t.
6	Amaury Capiot (BEL)	s.t.
7	Roy Jans (BEL)	s.t.
8	Hugo Hofstetter (FRA)	s.t.
9	Adam Blythe (GBR)	s.t.
10	Eduard-Michael Grosu (ROM)	s.t.
