= 2022 Volta a la Comunitat Valenciana =

Spanish cycling race

2022 UCI ProSeries

Race details
- Dates: 2–6 February 2022
- Stages: 5
- Distance: 779 km (484.0 mi)
- Winning time: 18h 56' 45"

Results
Jersey awarded to the overall winner	Winner	Aleksandr Vlasov (RUS)	(Bora–Hansgrohe)
	Second	Remco Evenepoel (BEL)	(Quick-Step Alpha Vinyl Team)
	Third	Carlos Rodríguez (ESP)	(Ineos Grenadiers)
Jersey awarded to the points classification winner	Points	Fabio Jakobsen (NED)	(Quick-Step Alpha Vinyl Team)
Jersey awarded to the mountains classification winner	Mountains	Ben King (USA)	(Human Powered Health)
Jersey awarded to the youth classification winner	Youth	Remco Evenepoel (BEL)	(Quick-Step Alpha Vinyl Team)
	Team	Ineos Grenadiers	

The 2022 Volta a la Comunitat Valenciana (English: Tour of the Valencian Community) was a road cycling stage race that took place from 2 to 6 February 2022 in the autonomous community of Valencia in eastern Spain. The race was rated as a category 2.Pro event on the 2022 UCI ProSeries calendar, and was the 73rd edition of the Volta a la Comunitat Valenciana.

== Teams ==
15 of the 18 UCI WorldTeams and eight UCI ProTeams made up the 23 teams that participated in the race. All but two teams entered a full squad of seven riders; Team BikeExchange–Jayco and UAE Team Emirates each entered six riders.

Before stage 3, Team BikeExchange–Jayco voluntarily withdrew from the race after two unspecified members of their squad tested positive for COVID-19. Before stage 4, Team Jumbo–Visma and Team DSM followed suit after two and three unspecified members, respectively, of both teams tested positive. On the other hand, Movistar Team opted to continue racing after two riders, Juri Hollmann and Einer Rubio, tested positive after stage 1, though both riders were withdrawn. As a result, only 117 of the 159 riders who started the race finished.

UCI WorldTeams

- AG2R Citroën Team
- Astana Qazaqstan Team
- Bora–Hansgrohe
- Groupama–FDJ
- Ineos Grenadiers
- Intermarché–Wanty–Gobert Matériaux
- Israel–Premier Tech
- Movistar Team
- Quick-Step Alpha Vinyl Team
- Team Bahrain Victorious
- Team BikeExchange–Jayco
- Team DSM
- Team Jumbo–Visma
- Trek–Segafredo
- UAE Team Emirates

UCI ProTeams

- B&B Hotels–KTM
- Bingoal Pauwels Sauces WB
- Burgos BH
- Caja Rural–Seguros RGA
- Equipo Kern Pharma
- Euskaltel–Euskadi
- Gazprom–RusVelo
- Human Powered Health

== Route ==
Stage characteristics and winners
Stage	Date	Course	Distance	Type	Stage winner
1	2 February	Les Alqueries to Torralba del Pinar	166.7 km (103.6 mi)	Mountain stage	Remco Evenepoel (BEL)
2	3 February	Bétera to Torrent	172.1 km (106.9 mi)	Hilly stage	Fabio Jakobsen (NED)
3	4 February	Alicante to Alto de las Antenas del Maigmó Tibi	155.1 km (96.4 mi)	Mountain stage	Aleksandr Vlasov (RUS)
4	5 February	Orihuela to Torrevieja	193.1 km (120.0 mi)	Flat stage	Matteo Moschetti (ITA)
5	6 February	Paterna to Valencia	92 km (57 mi)	Flat stage	Fabio Jakobsen (NED)
Total			779 km (484 mi)		

== Stages ==
=== Stage 1 ===
2 February 2022 — Les Alqueries to Torralba del Pinar, 166.7 km (103.6 mi)

Stage 1 Result (1–10)
Rank	Rider	Team	Time
1	Remco Evenepoel (BEL)	Quick-Step Alpha Vinyl Team	4h 16' 32"
2	Aleksandr Vlasov (RUS)	Bora–Hansgrohe	+ 16"
3	Carlos Rodríguez (ESP)	Ineos Grenadiers	+ 31"
4	Enric Mas (ESP)	Movistar Team	+ 32"
5	Luis León Sánchez (ESP)	Team Bahrain Victorious	+ 32"
6	Antwan Tolhoek (NED)	Trek–Segafredo	+ 32"
7	Alejandro Valverde (ESP)	Movistar Team	+ 32"
8	Jakob Fuglsang (DEN)	Israel–Premier Tech	+ 32"
9	Matej Mohorič (SLO)	Team Bahrain Victorious	+ 42"
10	David de la Cruz (ESP)	Astana Qazaqstan Team	+ 53"

General classification after Stage 1 (1–10)
Rank	Rider	Team	Time
1	Remco Evenepoel (BEL)	Quick-Step Alpha Vinyl Team	4h 16' 22"
2	Aleksandr Vlasov (RUS)	Bora–Hansgrohe	+ 19"
3	Carlos Rodríguez (ESP)	Ineos Grenadiers	+ 37"
4	Enric Mas (ESP)	Movistar Team	+ 42"
5	Luis León Sánchez (ESP)	Team Bahrain Victorious	+ 42"
6	Antwan Tolhoek (NED)	Trek–Segafredo	+ 42"
7	Alejandro Valverde (ESP)	Movistar Team	+ 42"
8	Jakob Fuglsang (DEN)	Israel–Premier Tech	+ 42"
9	Matej Mohorič (SLO)	Team Bahrain Victorious	+ 48"
10	David de la Cruz (ESP)	Astana Qazaqstan Team	+ 1' 03"

=== Stage 2 ===
3 February 2022 — Bétera to Torrent, 172.1 km (106.9 mi)

Stage 2 Result (1–10)
Rank	Rider	Team	Time
1	Fabio Jakobsen (NED)	Quick-Step Alpha Vinyl Team	4h 09' 51"
2	Juan Sebastián Molano (COL)	UAE Team Emirates	+ 0"
3	Elia Viviani (ITA)	Ineos Grenadiers	+ 0"
4	Matej Mohorič (SLO)	Team Bahrain Victorious	+ 0"
5	Alexander Kristoff (NOR)	Intermarché–Wanty–Gobert Matériaux	+ 0"
6	Luca Mozzato (ITA)	B&B Hotels–KTM	+ 0"
7	Remco Evenepoel (BEL)	Quick-Step Alpha Vinyl Team	+ 0"
8	Andrea Pasqualon (ITA)	Intermarché–Wanty–Gobert Matériaux	+ 0"
9	Laurenz Rex (BEL)	Bingoal Pauwels Sauces WB	+ 0"
10	Jesús Ezquerra (ESP)	Burgos BH	+ 0"

General classification after Stage 2 (1–10)
Rank	Rider	Team	Time
1	Remco Evenepoel (BEL)	Quick-Step Alpha Vinyl Team	8h 26' 13"
2	Aleksandr Vlasov (RUS)	Bora–Hansgrohe	+ 19"
3	Carlos Rodríguez (ESP)	Ineos Grenadiers	+ 37"
4	Luis León Sánchez (ESP)	Team Bahrain Victorious	+ 42"
5	Enric Mas (ESP)	Movistar Team	+ 42"
6	Alejandro Valverde (ESP)	Movistar Team	+ 42"
7	Jakob Fuglsang (DEN)	Israel–Premier Tech	+ 42"
8	Antwan Tolhoek (NED)	Trek–Segafredo	+ 42"
9	Matej Mohorič (SLO)	Team Bahrain Victorious	+ 48"
10	Juan Ayuso (ESP)	UAE Team Emirates	+ 1' 14"

=== Stage 3 ===
4 February 2022 — Alicante to Alto de las Antenas del Maigmó Tibi, 155.1 km (96.4 mi)

Stage 3 Result (1–10)
Rank	Rider	Team	Time
1	Aleksandr Vlasov (RUS)	Bora–Hansgrohe	4h 02' 17"
2	Carlos Rodríguez (ESP)	Ineos Grenadiers	+ 14"
3	Enric Mas (ESP)	Movistar Team	+ 21"
4	Pello Bilbao (ESP)	Team Bahrain Victorious	+ 29"
5	Alejandro Valverde (ESP)	Movistar Team	+ 29"
6	Jakob Fuglsang (DEN)	Israel–Premier Tech	+ 32"
7	Giulio Ciccone (ITA)	Trek–Segafredo	+ 35"
8	Remco Evenepoel (BEL)	Quick-Step Alpha Vinyl Team	+ 41"
9	Luis León Sánchez (ESP)	Team Bahrain Victorious	+ 41"
10	David de la Cruz (ESP)	Astana Qazaqstan Team	+ 50"

General classification after Stage 3 (1–10)
Rank	Rider	Team	Time
1	Aleksandr Vlasov (RUS)	Bora–Hansgrohe	12h 28' 39"
2	Remco Evenepoel (BEL)	Quick-Step Alpha Vinyl Team	+ 32"
3	Carlos Rodríguez (ESP)	Ineos Grenadiers	+ 36"
4	Enric Mas (ESP)	Movistar Team	+ 50"
5	Alejandro Valverde (ESP)	Movistar Team	+ 1' 02"
6	Jakob Fuglsang (DEN)	Israel–Premier Tech	+ 1' 05"
7	Luis León Sánchez (ESP)	Team Bahrain Victorious	+ 1' 14"
8	Giulio Ciccone (ITA)	Trek–Segafredo	+ 2' 00"
9	Pavel Sivakov (RUS)	Ineos Grenadiers	+ 2' 05"
10	David de la Cruz (ESP)	Astana Qazaqstan Team	+ 2' 28"

=== Stage 4 ===
5 February 2022 — Orihuela to Torrevieja, 193.1 km (120.0 mi)

Stage 4 Result (1–10)
Rank	Rider	Team	Time
1	Matteo Moschetti (ITA)	Trek–Segafredo	4h 32' 17"
2	Manuel Peñalver (ESP)	Burgos BH	+ 0"
3	Alexander Kristoff (NOR)	Intermarché–Wanty–Gobert Matériaux	+ 0"
4	Elia Viviani (ITA)	Ineos Grenadiers	+ 0"
5	Fabio Jakobsen (NED)	Quick-Step Alpha Vinyl Team	+ 0"
6	Stanisław Aniołkowski (POL)	Bingoal Pauwels Sauces WB	+ 0"
7	Juan Sebastián Molano (COL)	UAE Team Emirates	+ 0"
8	Timothy Dupont (BEL)	Bingoal Pauwels Sauces WB	+ 0"
9	Matej Mohorič (SLO)	Team Bahrain Victorious	+ 0"
10	Luca Mozzato (ITA)	B&B Hotels–KTM	+ 0"

General classification after Stage 4 (1–10)
Rank	Rider	Team	Time
1	Aleksandr Vlasov (RUS)	Bora–Hansgrohe	17h 00' 56"
2	Remco Evenepoel (BEL)	Quick-Step Alpha Vinyl Team	+ 32"
3	Carlos Rodríguez (ESP)	Ineos Grenadiers	+ 36"
4	Enric Mas (ESP)	Movistar Team	+ 50"
5	Alejandro Valverde (ESP)	Movistar Team	+ 1' 02"
6	Jakob Fuglsang (DEN)	Israel–Premier Tech	+ 1' 05"
7	Luis León Sánchez (ESP)	Team Bahrain Victorious	+ 1' 14"
8	Giulio Ciccone (ITA)	Trek–Segafredo	+ 2' 00"
9	Pavel Sivakov (RUS)	Ineos Grenadiers	+ 2' 05"
10	David de la Cruz (ESP)	Astana Qazaqstan Team	+ 2' 28"

=== Stage 5 ===
6 February 2022 — Paterna to Valencia, 92 km (57 mi)

Stage 5 Result (1–10)
Rank	Rider	Team	Time
1	Fabio Jakobsen (NED)	Quick-Step Alpha Vinyl Team	1h 55' 49"
2	Elia Viviani (ITA)	Ineos Grenadiers	+ 0"
3	Alexander Kristoff (NOR)	Intermarché–Wanty–Gobert Matériaux	+ 0"
4	Timothy Dupont (BEL)	Bingoal Pauwels Sauces WB	+ 0"
5	Stanisław Aniołkowski (POL)	Bingoal Pauwels Sauces WB	+ 0"
6	Matteo Trentin (ITA)	UAE Team Emirates	+ 0"
7	Manuel Peñalver (ESP)	Burgos BH	+ 0"
8	Juan Sebastián Molano (COL)	UAE Team Emirates	+ 0"
9	Fernando Barceló (ESP)	Caja Rural–Seguros RGA	+ 0"
10	Michael Mørkøv (DEN)	Quick-Step Alpha Vinyl Team	+ 0"

General classification after Stage 5 (1–10)
Rank	Rider	Team	Time
1	Aleksandr Vlasov (RUS)	Bora–Hansgrohe	18h 56' 45"
2	Remco Evenepoel (BEL)	Quick-Step Alpha Vinyl Team	+ 32"
3	Carlos Rodríguez (ESP)	Ineos Grenadiers	+ 36"
4	Enric Mas (ESP)	Movistar Team	+ 50"
5	Alejandro Valverde (ESP)	Movistar Team	+ 1' 02"
6	Jakob Fuglsang (DEN)	Israel–Premier Tech	+ 1' 05"
7	Luis León Sánchez (ESP)	Team Bahrain Victorious	+ 1' 14"
8	Giulio Ciccone (ITA)	Trek–Segafredo	+ 2' 00"
9	Pavel Sivakov (RUS)	Ineos Grenadiers	+ 2' 05"
10	David de la Cruz (ESP)	Astana Qazaqstan Team	+ 2' 28"

== Classification leadership table ==
Classification leadership by stage
Stage	Winner	General classification	Points classification	Mountains classification	Young rider classification	Team classification
1	Remco Evenepoel	Remco Evenepoel	Remco Evenepoel	Ben King	Remco Evenepoel	Team Bahrain Victorious
2	Fabio Jakobsen	Remco Evenepoel	Remco Evenepoel	Ben King	Remco Evenepoel	Team Bahrain Victorious
3	Aleksandr Vlasov	Aleksandr Vlasov	Aleksandr Vlasov	Ben King	Remco Evenepoel	Ineos Grenadiers
4	Matteo Moschetti	Aleksandr Vlasov	Aleksandr Vlasov	Ben King	Remco Evenepoel	Ineos Grenadiers
5	Fabio Jakobsen	Aleksandr Vlasov	Fabio Jakobsen	Ben King	Remco Evenepoel	Ineos Grenadiers
Final		Aleksandr Vlasov	Fabio Jakobsen	Ben King	Remco Evenepoel	Ineos Grenadiers

- On stage 2, Aleksandr Vlasov, who was second in the points classification, wore the orange jersey, because first-placed Remco Evenepoel wore the yellow jersey as the leader of the general classification. For the same reason, Fabio Jakobsen wore the orange jersey on stage 3, while Carlos Rodríguez, who was second in the young rider classification, wore the white jersey on stages 2 and 3.
- On stages 4 and 5, Carlos Rodríguez, who was third in the points classification, wore the orange jersey, because first-placed Aleksandr Vlasov wore the yellow jersey as the leader of the general classification, and second-placed Remco Evenepoel wore the white jersey as the leader of the young rider classification.

== Final classification standings ==
Legend
Denotes the winner of the general classification	Denotes the winner of the mountains classification
Denotes the winner of the points classification	Denotes the winner of the young rider classification

=== General classification ===
Final general classification (1–10)
Rank	Rider	Team	Time
1	Aleksandr Vlasov (RUS)	Bora–Hansgrohe	18h 56' 45"
2	Remco Evenepoel (BEL)	Quick-Step Alpha Vinyl Team	+ 32"
3	Carlos Rodríguez (ESP)	Ineos Grenadiers	+ 36"
4	Enric Mas (ESP)	Movistar Team	+ 50"
5	Alejandro Valverde (ESP)	Movistar Team	+ 1' 02"
6	Jakob Fuglsang (DEN)	Israel–Premier Tech	+ 1' 05"
7	Luis León Sánchez (ESP)	Team Bahrain Victorious	+ 1' 14"
8	Giulio Ciccone (ITA)	Trek–Segafredo	+ 2' 00"
9	Pavel Sivakov (RUS)	Ineos Grenadiers	+ 2' 05"
10	David de la Cruz (ESP)	Astana Qazaqstan Team	+ 2' 28"

=== Points classification ===
Final points classification (1–10)
Rank	Rider	Team	Points
1	Fabio Jakobsen (NED)	Quick-Step Alpha Vinyl Team	62
2	Aleksandr Vlasov (RUS)	Bora–Hansgrohe	50
3	Elia Viviani (ITA)	Ineos Grenadiers	50
4	Alexander Kristoff (NOR)	Intermarché–Wanty–Gobert Matériaux	44
5	Remco Evenepoel (BEL)	Quick-Step Alpha Vinyl Team	42
6	Juan Sebastián Molano (COL)	UAE Team Emirates	37
7	Carlos Rodríguez (ESP)	Ineos Grenadiers	36
8	Matej Mohorič (SLO)	Team Bahrain Victorious	32
9	Manuel Peñalver (ESP)	Burgos BH	31
10	Enric Mas (ESP)	Movistar Team	30

=== Mountains classification ===
Final mountains classification (1–10)
Rank	Rider	Team	Points
1	Ben King (USA)	Human Powered Health	30
2	Aleksandr Vlasov (RUS)	Bora–Hansgrohe	14
3	Jan Tratnik (SLO)	Team Bahrain Victorious	10
4	Remco Evenepoel (BEL)	Quick-Step Alpha Vinyl Team	8
5	Carlos Rodríguez (ESP)	Ineos Grenadiers	8
6	Enric Mas (ESP)	Movistar Team	8
7	Sven Erik Bystrøm (NOR)	Intermarché–Wanty–Gobert Matériaux	6
8	Attila Valter (HUN)	Groupama–FDJ	6
9	Joan Bou (ESP)	Euskaltel–Euskadi	6
10	Jesús Ezquerra (ESP)	Burgos BH	6

=== Young rider classification ===
Final young rider classification (1–10)
Rank	Rider	Team	Time
1	Remco Evenepoel (BEL)	Quick-Step Alpha Vinyl Team	18h 57' 17"
2	Carlos Rodríguez (ESP)	Ineos Grenadiers	+ 4"
3	Pavel Sivakov (RUS)	Ineos Grenadiers	+ 1' 33"
4	Juan Ayuso (ESP)	UAE Team Emirates	+ 3' 56"
5	Maxime Chevalier (FRA)	B&B Hotels–KTM	+ 4' 35"
6	Attila Valter (HUN)	Groupama–FDJ	+ 4' 54"
7	José Félix Parra (ESP)	Equipo Kern Pharma	+ 6' 19"
8	Pelayo Sánchez (ESP)	Burgos BH	+ 6' 49"
9	Axel Laurance (FRA)	B&B Hotels–KTM	+ 8' 17"
10	Asbjørn Hellemose (DEN)	Trek–Segafredo	+ 10' 28"

=== Team classification ===
Final team classification (1–10)
Rank	Team	Time
1	Ineos Grenadiers	56h 56' 00"
2	Team Bahrain Victorious	+ 31"
3	Trek–Segafredo	+ 6' 51"
4	Astana Qazaqstan Team	+ 6' 51"
5	Movistar Team	+ 7' 02"
6	Euskaltel–Euskadi	+ 8' 18"
7	Israel–Premier Tech	+ 10' 09"
8	Gazprom–RusVelo	+ 14' 41"
9	Bora–Hansgrohe	+ 19' 39"
10	Groupama–FDJ	+ 20' 08"
