= 2015 Amstel Gold Race =

2015 UCI World Tour, race 11 of 28
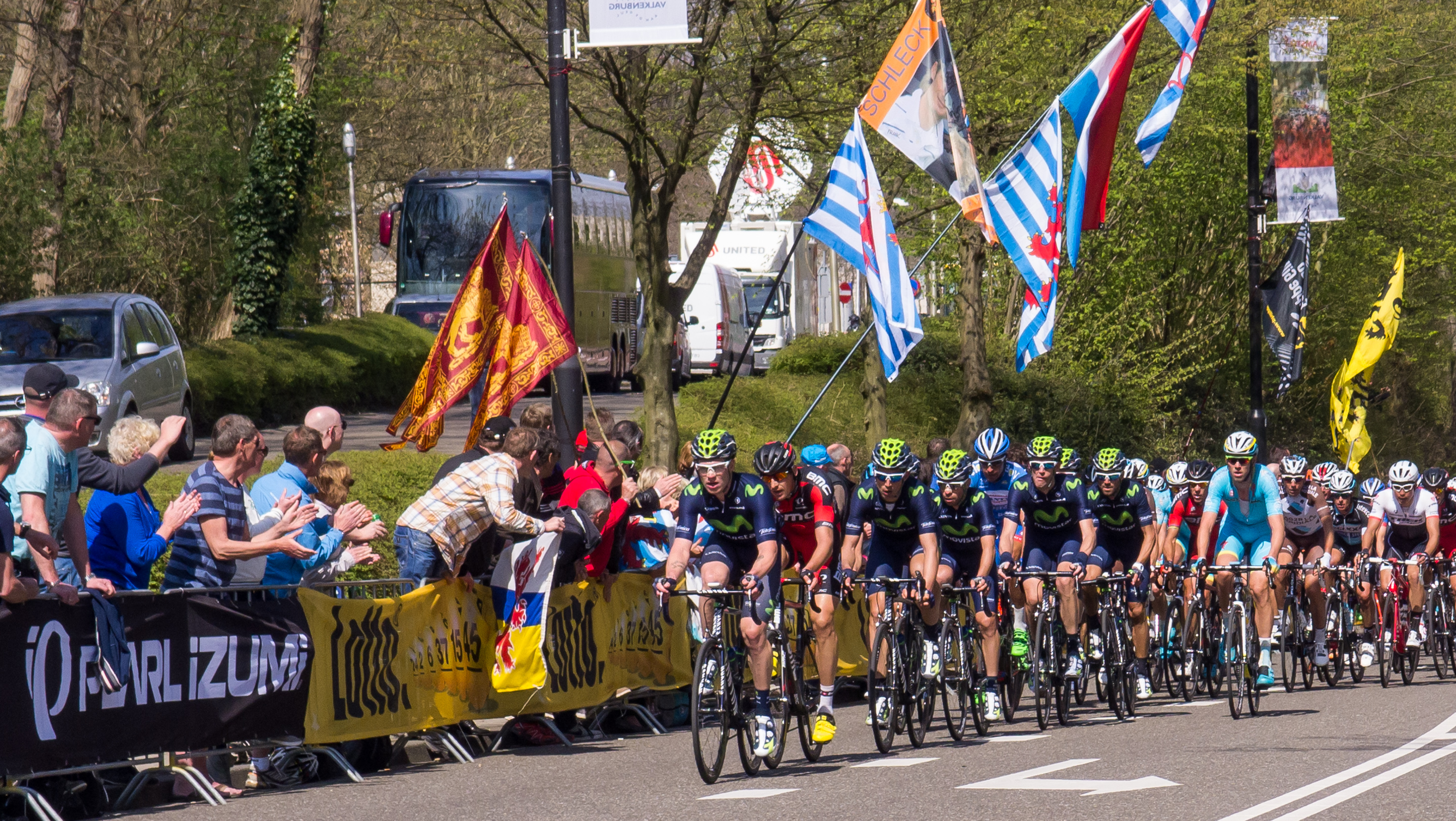
- Cauberg during the 2015 race

Race details
- Dates: 19 April 2015
- Distance: 258 km (160.3 mi)
- Winning time: 6h 31' 49"

Results
	Winner	Michał Kwiatkowski (POL)	(Etixx–Quick-Step)
	Second	Alejandro Valverde (ESP)	(Movistar Team)
	Third	Michael Matthews (AUS)	(Orica–GreenEDGE)

The 2015 Amstel Gold Race was the 50th edition of the Amstel Gold Race one-day race. It took place on 19 April and was the eleventh race of the 2015 UCI World Tour. The Amstel Gold Race formed part of the Ardennes classics season, although it took place in the Limburg region of the Netherlands rather than in the Belgian Ardennes. It took place in the week before La Flèche Wallonne and Liège–Bastogne–Liège, the other principal Ardennes classics. The defending champion in the 2015 edition of the race was Philippe Gilbert, who had won the race three times and had also won the 2012 world championships on a very similar course.

The race took place on a 258-kilometre (160 mi) route centred on the town of Valkenburg aan de Geul; the route included 34 short climbs, several of which were repeated. The decisive climb was the Cauberg, the fourth ascent of which came within 2 kilometres (1.2 miles) of the finishing line. The race typically suited puncheurs.

After several attacking groups were caught, the decisive action came on the final ascent of the Cauberg. A small group formed after the climb and sprinted for the race victory. The sprint was won by Michał Kwiatkowski, the reigning world champion; it was his first road race victory since he won the world championships. Alejandro Valverde (Movistar Team) was second, with Michael Matthews (Orica–GreenEDGE) third.

== Teams ==
The Amstel Gold Race was part of the 2015 UCI World Tour, which meant that the 17 UCI WorldTeams were automatically invited and obliged to send a team. The race organisers also made eight wildcard invitations to UCI Professional Continental teams. The peloton was therefore made up of 25 teams. With eight riders on each team, a total of 200 riders were entered. Two of these, IAM Cycling's Dries Devenyns (sore back) and Thomas Degand (stomach upset), were forced to pull out before the start, so 198 riders started the race.

UCI WorldTeams

- AG2R La Mondiale
- Astana
- BMC Racing Team
- Etixx–Quick-Step
- FDJ
- IAM Cycling
- Lampre–Merida
- Lotto–Soudal
- Movistar Team
- Orica–GreenEDGE
- Cannondale–Garmin
- Team Giant–Alpecin
- Team Katusha
- LottoNL–Jumbo
- Team Sky
- Tinkoff–Saxo
- Trek Factory Racing

UCI Professional Continental teams

- MTN–Qhubeka
- CCC–Sprandi–Polkowice
- Nippo–Vini Fantini
- Cult Energy Pro Cycling
- Bardiani–CSF
- Team Roompot
- Wanty–Groupe Gobert
- Topsport Vlaanderen–Baloise

== Route ==
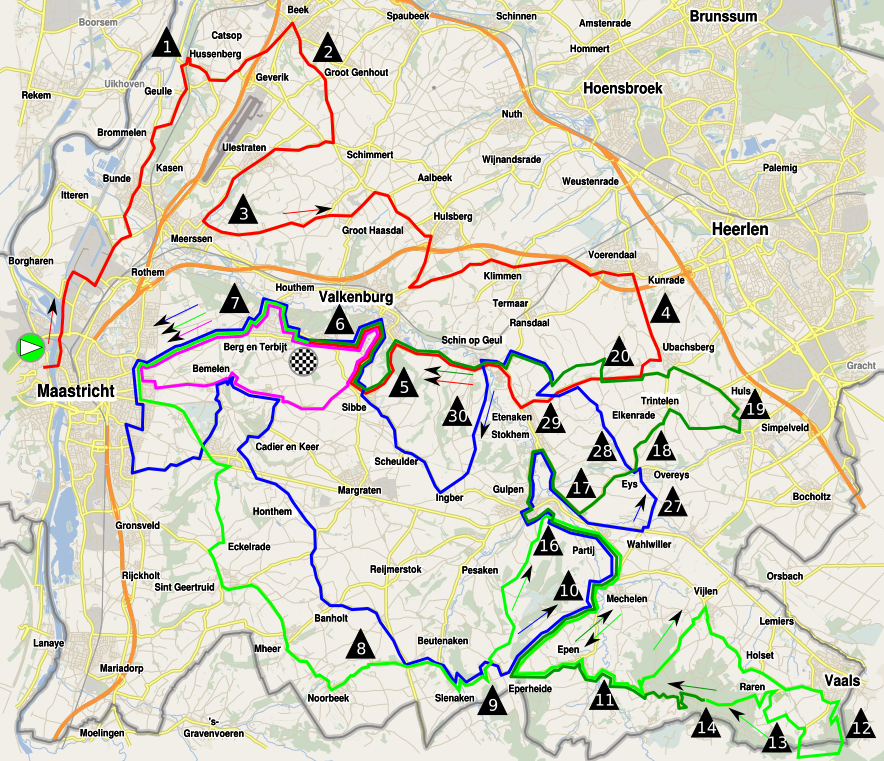
Route of the 2015 race

The 258-kilometre (160-mile) route of the 2015 Amstel Gold Race began in Maastricht and left the city towards the north. The riders passed through the towns of Bunde and Geulle on their way to the first climbs of the day. The first climb of the day was the Slingerberg; the peloton then passed through Beek and climbed the Adsteeg. These climbs came within the first 15 kilometres (9.3 miles) of racing. The route then turned south through Meerssen, where the riders climbed the third climb, the Lange Raarberg, then east in the direction of Heerlen. The course turned, however, before they reached Heerlen, first heading south across the climb of the Bergseweg, then west. At this point, the route entered a series of circuits around the town of Valkenburg aan de Geul. The riders climbed the Sibbergrubbe and the Cauberg for the first time. The first climb of the Cauberg came after 54 kilometres (34 miles).

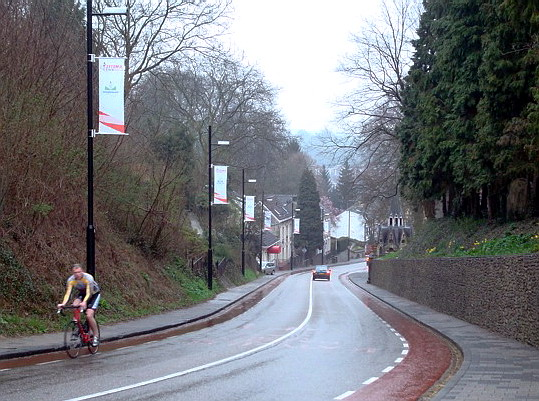
The Cauberg, climbed four times during the race

The first of the loops around Valkenburg was the longest at 101.6 kilometres (63.1 miles). The riders first climbed the Geulhemmerberg as they left Valkenburg, then turned south-east. The next 20 kilometres (12 miles) contained no categorised climbs, though the roads were far from flat. The next climb, the Wolfsburg, came after 78.1 kilometres (48.5 miles) and was followed quickly by the first climb of the Loorberg. The route then briefly turned north, before turning south again on the outskirts of Gulpen. The next climb, the Schweibergerweg, came after 92.5 kilometres (57.5 miles) of racing, with the Camerig 6 kilometres (3.7 miles) later. The riders then entered a short circuit around the town of Vaals, where the Drielandenpunt, the Gemmenich and the Vijlenerbos came within 9 kilometres (5.6 miles) of one another. The route then returned to Gulpen along the same roads, with the Eperheide the only categorised climb. In Gulpen, the route crossed the Gulpenerberg, then turned east to cross the Plettenberg and the Eyserweg. The riders then reached Simpelveld, where they turned west again towards Valkenburg. The final part of the loop took the peloton across the climb of Huls and the Vrakelberg. As they entered Valkenburg, the riders climbed the Sibbergrubbe and the Cauberg for the second time. As the riders crossed the finish line in Valkenburg, they had 99.8 kilometres (62.0 miles) remaining.

The second loop was shorter than the first at 71.3 kilometres (44.3 miles). It again began with the climb of the Geulhemmerberg, then travelled through the outskirts of Maastricht. The route again turned north, this time to climb the Bemelerberg, before another turn to the south-east towards Beutenaken. The route re-used several of the roads that made up the first loop: the riders climbed the Loorberg for the second time, then turned north for the second climb of the Gulpenerberg. From this point, the peloton took a different route towards Valkenburg, which included the climbs of the Kruisberg, the Eyserbosweg, the Fromberg and the Keutenberg. On this loop, the riders did not climb the Sibbergrubbe but proceeded directly to the third climb of the Cauberg. This was seen as a moment when an early attack might succeed and came with 21.1 kilometres (13.1 miles) remaining.

The final loop was the shortest of the day at 18.5 kilometres (11.5 miles). The riders climbed the Geulhemmerberg for the third time, then the Bemelerberg for the second time. This was the penultimate climb of the day. The final climb was a fourth ascent of the Cauberg. At the base of the climb, there were 2.6 kilometres (1.6 miles) remaining. The climb itself was 900 metres (3,000 ft) in length, with an average gradient of 7% and a maximum gradient of 12%. At the top of the climb, there were approximately 1.7 kilometres (1.1 miles) of fairly flat roads to the finish line in Berg en Terblijt.

== Pre-race favourites ==
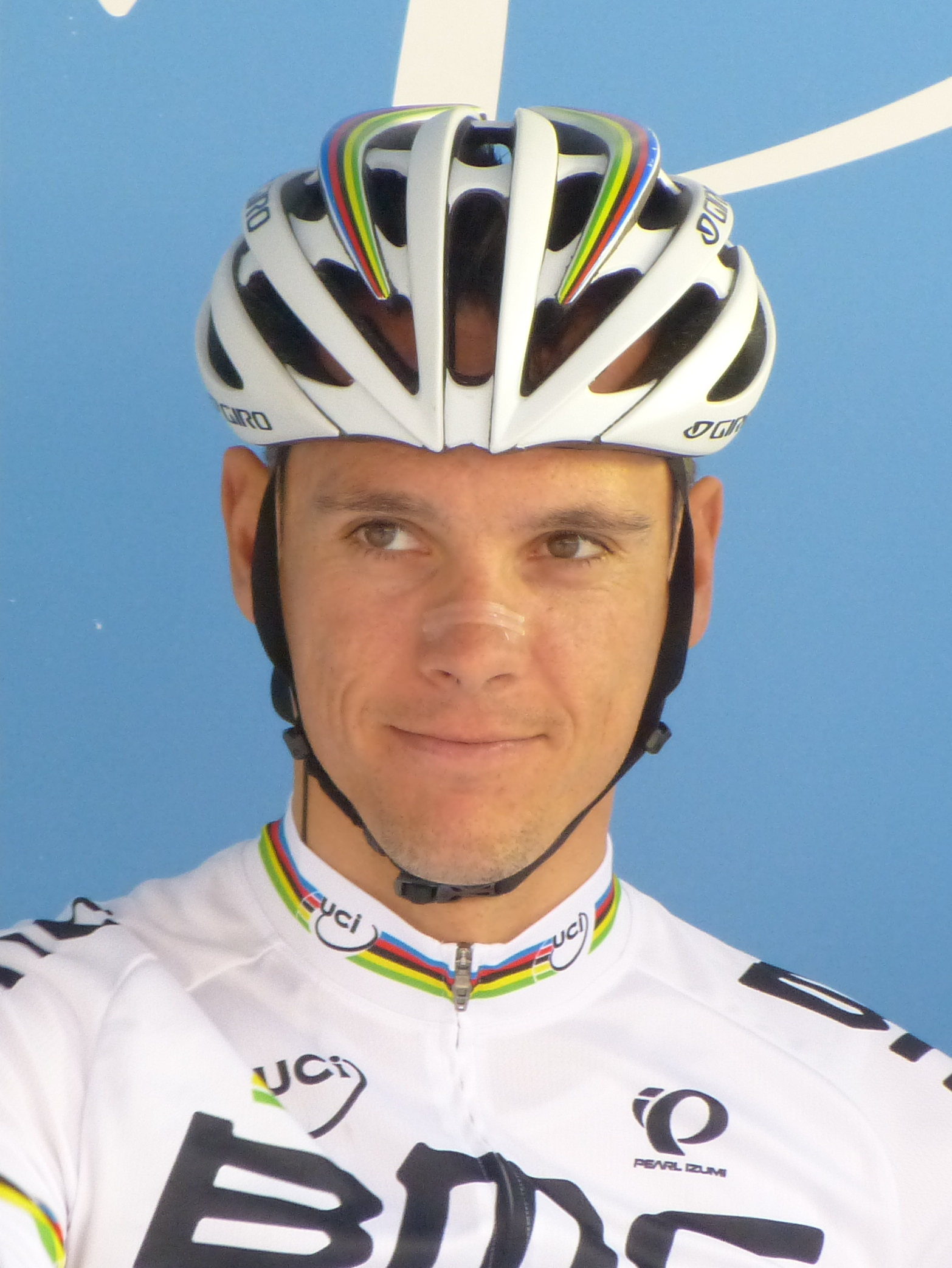
Philippe Gilbert, three-time winner of the race, wearing the rainbow jersey he won on a similar course in the 2012 world championships

The Amstel Gold Race had been won in the past by riders who attacked a long distance from the finish line. This happened as recently as 2013, when Roman Kreuziger attacked shortly after the penultimate climb of the Cauberg. Normally, however, the race was decided on the final ascent of the Cauberg; in the 2014 edition, Philippe Gilbert (BMC Racing Team) attacked midway up the climb and was able to take a solo victory. As there was a flat section after the climb, there was also opportunities for riders dropped on the Cauberg to rejoin any escapees and to bring the race together for a sprint finish. The race was therefore expected to suit puncheurs, especially those who were also able to defend a solo lead ahead of a chasing group.

Gilbert, the defending champion, was the main favourite for the race. As well as his 2014 victory, he had won the race in 2010 and 2011; he also won the 2012 world championships road race, which was raced on a very similar course. Gilbert had demonstrated good form by coming third the previous week in Brabantse Pijl. Several other former champions took part in 2014: Kreuziger (Tinkoff–Saxo), Enrico Gasparotto (Wanty–Groupe Gobert), Damiano Cunego (Nippo–Vini Fantini), Fränk Schleck (Trek Factory Racing), Stefan Schumacher and Davide Rebellin (both CCC–Sprandi–Polkowice).

Alejandro Valverde (Movistar Team), who had come fourth in 2014, was also among the major favourites and was in strong form following three stage wins during the Volta a Catalunya. Michał Kwiatkowski (Etixx–Quick-Step), the incumbent world champion, Joaquim Rodríguez (Team Katusha) and Michael Matthews (Orica–GreenEDGE) were also considered to have a strong chance of winning the race. Matthews in particular was the favourite to win any small bunch sprint if a group came together after the Cauberg.

== Race report ==
An early breakaway was formed by six riders after more than 20 kilometres (12 miles), after the climb of the Lange Raarberg. The six riders were Laurens De Vreese (Astana), Jan Polanc (Lampre–Merida), Timo Roosen (LottoNL–Jumbo), Linus Gerdemann (Cult Energy Pro Cycling), Johann van Zyl (MTN–Qhubeka) and Mike Terpstra (Team Roompot). The peloton initially hesitated in letting the break escape, but soon relented and the leading group's advantage grew to approximately 10 minutes by the time they reached Mechelen after 90 kilometres (56 miles) of racing. The peloton was led by BMC Racing Team and CCC–Sprandi–Polkowice. There were several crashes during this phase of the race; Jelle Vanendert (Lotto–Soudal), who was second in 2014, and Lieuwe Westra (Astana) were among the riders forced to abandon the race. As the riders crossed the finish line for the second time, with 99.8 kilometres (62.0 miles) remaining, they had a lead of approximately six minutes as the riders in the peloton began to chase.

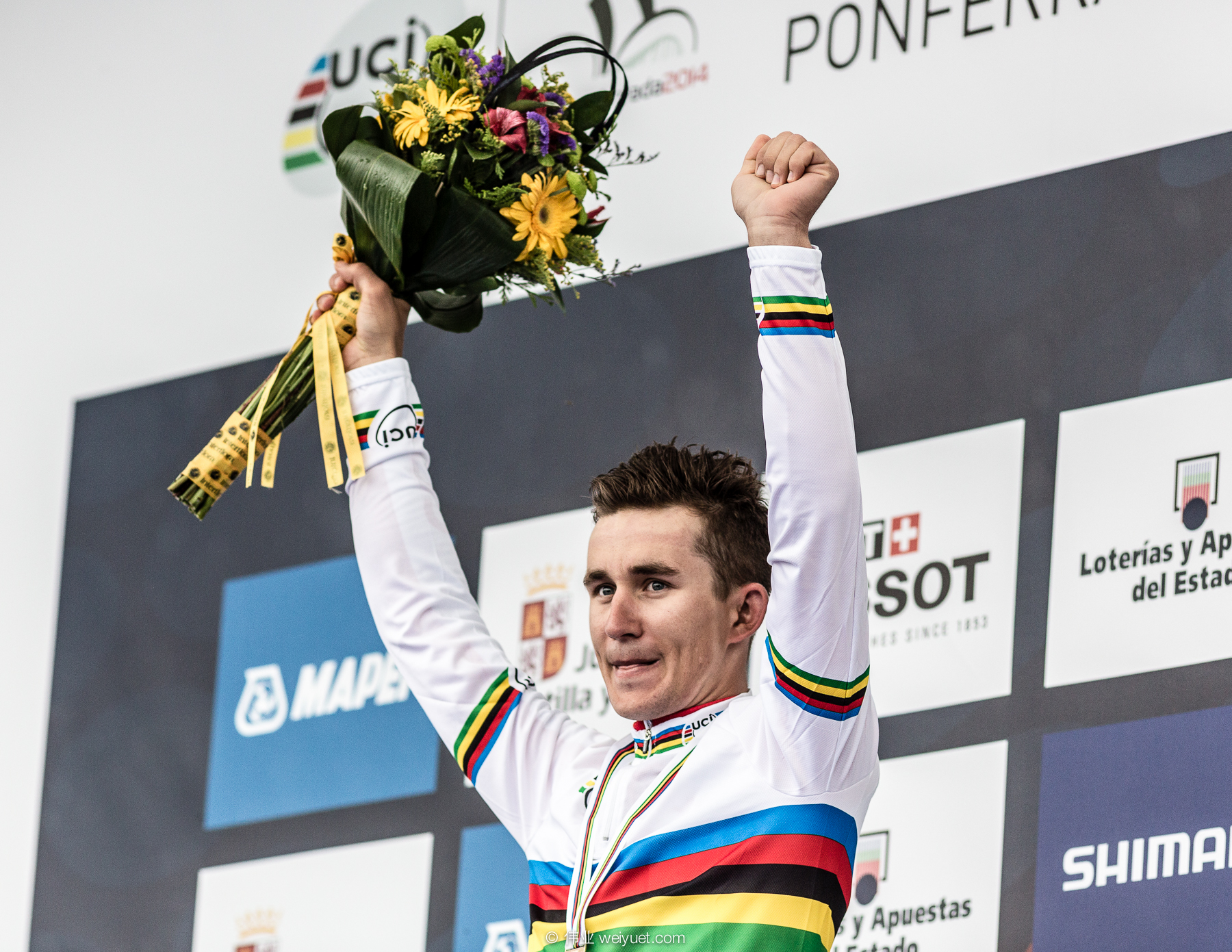
Michał Kwiatkowski (here pictured after winning the 2014 world championships road race) won his first race in the rainbow jersey in a sprint finish

On the second loop around Valkenburg, Movistar Team came to the front of the peloton to chase the breakaway in support of Alejandro Valverde. They reduced the breakaway's lead to four minutes and briefly broke a small group free on the descent from the Bemelerberg, but a mechanical problem for Valverde forced them to stop chasing and bring him back to the front of the peloton. As the riders came to the end of the loop, three riders had been dropped from the breakaway and the group's lead was under a minute. The first attacks from the peloton came on the Eyserbosweg, with David Tanner (IAM Cycling) and Simon Clarke (Orica–GreenEDGE) attacking and forming a lead group. A second group attacked, made up of Tony Martin (Etixx–Quick-Step), Vincenzo Nibali and Diego Rosa (both Astana), Wilco Kelderman (LottoNL–Jumbo), Damiano Caruso (BMC Racing Team) and Alex Howes (Cannondale–Garmin). With 37 kilometres (23 miles) remaining, Clarke and Tanner had an 11-second lead over the second group, with the peloton a further 24 seconds behind. The original breakaway, meanwhile, had been caught.

Kelderman missed a corner shortly afterwards and was forced to ride through a field to rejoin the race; he was unable to catch up with the leading riders. The two groups came together shortly afterwards, although there was some disagreement in the group about the riders' commitment to the breakaway attempt. Rosa and Caruso crashed on a corner, reducing the group to five riders, while Movistar Team were again leading the chasing peloton. The group was caught with 15 kilometres (9.3 miles) remaining. Clarke then attacked again, but was caught 7 kilometres (4.3 miles) later. One final attack was made by Jakob Fuglsang (Astana) and Greg Van Avermaet (BMC Racing Team); Van Avermaet refused to assist Fuglsang in setting the pace and they were soon caught. The peloton was therefore all together for the final ascent of the Cauberg.

In 2014, Samuel Sánchez (then BMC Racing Team) had attacked at the foot of the Cauberg on behalf of his teammate Philippe Gilbert, whose subsequent attack allowed him to take the race victory. They attempted to replicate this strategy with an attack from Ben Hermans in the same place as Sánchez. Gilbert's attack, however, was less successful than his 2014 effort: although most riders were dropped, Michael Matthews was able to hold his wheel. Michał Kwiatkowski was chasing alone at this point. Valverde bridged across to Gilbert and Matthews, with another 15 riders joining the group shortly afterwards. Kwiatkowski was a long way behind with 500 metres (1,600 ft) remaining, but was able to stay in the slipstream of the other riders and recover from the climb. He then began a long sprint and was able to keep the rest of the group behind him. Valverde finished second, with Matthews third. Kwiatkowski's win was his first win in the rainbow jersey of the world champion.

== Results ==
Race result
Rank	Rider	Team	Time
1	Michał Kwiatkowski (POL)	Etixx–Quick-Step	6h 31' 49"
2	Alejandro Valverde (ESP)	Movistar Team	+ 0"
3	Michael Matthews (AUS)	Orica–GreenEDGE	+ 0"
4	Rui Costa (POR)	Lampre–Merida	+ 0"
5	Greg Van Avermaet (BEL)	BMC Racing Team	+ 0"
6	Tony Gallopin (FRA)	Lotto–Soudal	+ 0"
7	Julian Alaphilippe (FRA)	Etixx–Quick-Step	+ 0"
8	Enrico Gasparotto (ITA)	Wanty–Groupe Gobert	+ 0"
9	Maciej Paterski (POL)	CCC–Sprandi–Polkowice	+ 0"
10	Philippe Gilbert (BEL)	BMC Racing Team	+ 0"

== Post-race analysis ==
=== Riders' reactions ===
Kwiatkowski's win was his first road race victory since his victory at the 2014 world championships (his only other 2015 victory was in the prologue individual time trial at the 2015 Paris–Nice). He also became the fourth rider to win the Amstel Gold Race while wearing the rainbow jersey; the others were Eddy Merckx, Jan Raas and Bernard Hinault. He described the race as "an amazing day" and said that it "[put] the dot on the i" following the Etixx–Quick-Step team's second-place finishes at the Tour of Flanders and Paris–Roubaix.

BMC Racing Team were praised for their tactics after the race, despite Gilbert's failure to repeat his victory; his tenth-place finish was his worst result since 2008. Gilbert attributed his failure to stay away from the chasing pack in part to the lack of a tailwind on the final flat section after the Cauberg, while his reputation as the main favourite for the race also worked to his disadvantage. Valverde, meanwhile, was delighted at his second-place finish, which was the best result of his career at the Amstel Gold Race, declaring himself "happy with second" and looking forward to the remainder of the Ardennes classics.

=== UCI World Tour rankings ===
After winning 80 points for his victory in the race, Kwiatkowski moved up from thirteenth place to fourth place in the UCI World Tour rankings. His total of 195 points left him 108 points behind the leader, Richie Porte (Team Sky). Valverde also moved into the top ten of the World Tour rankings. Etixx–Quick-Step moved ahead of Team Sky to take the lead in the teams' ranking; Australia remained in the lead of the nations' rankings.

UCI World Tour individual rankings
Rank	Rider	Team	Points
1	Richie Porte (AUS)	Team Sky	303
2	Alexander Kristoff (NOR)	Team Katusha	237
3	John Degenkolb (GER)	Team Giant–Alpecin	232
4	Michał Kwiatkowski (POL)	Etixx–Quick-Step	195
5	Geraint Thomas (GBR)	Team Sky	184
6	Greg Van Avermaet (BEL)	BMC Racing Team	178
7	Nairo Quintana (COL)	Movistar Team	168
8	Alejandro Valverde (ESP)	Movistar Team	158
9	Zdeněk Štybar (CZE)	Etixx–Quick-Step	152
10	Niki Terpstra (NED)	Etixx–Quick-Step	140
