= 2015 La Flèche Wallonne =

Single day road cycling race in Belgium

2015 UCI World Tour, race 12 of 28
- Event poster

Race details
- Dates: 22 April 2015
- Distance: 205.5 km (127.7 mi)
- Winning time: 5h 08' 22"

Results
	Winner	Alejandro Valverde (ESP)	(Movistar Team)
	Second	Julian Alaphilippe (FRA)	(Etixx–Quick-Step)
	Third	Michael Albasini (SUI)	(Orica–GreenEDGE)

The 2015 La Flèche Wallonne was the 79th edition of the La Flèche Wallonne one-day cycling classic; it took place on 22 April and was the twelfth race of the 2015 UCI World Tour. La Flèche Wallonne was the second of the three Ardennes classics, coming three days after the Amstel Gold Race (won in 2015 by Michał Kwiatkowski) and four days before Liège–Bastogne–Liège. The defending champion in the race was Alejandro Valverde (Movistar Team).

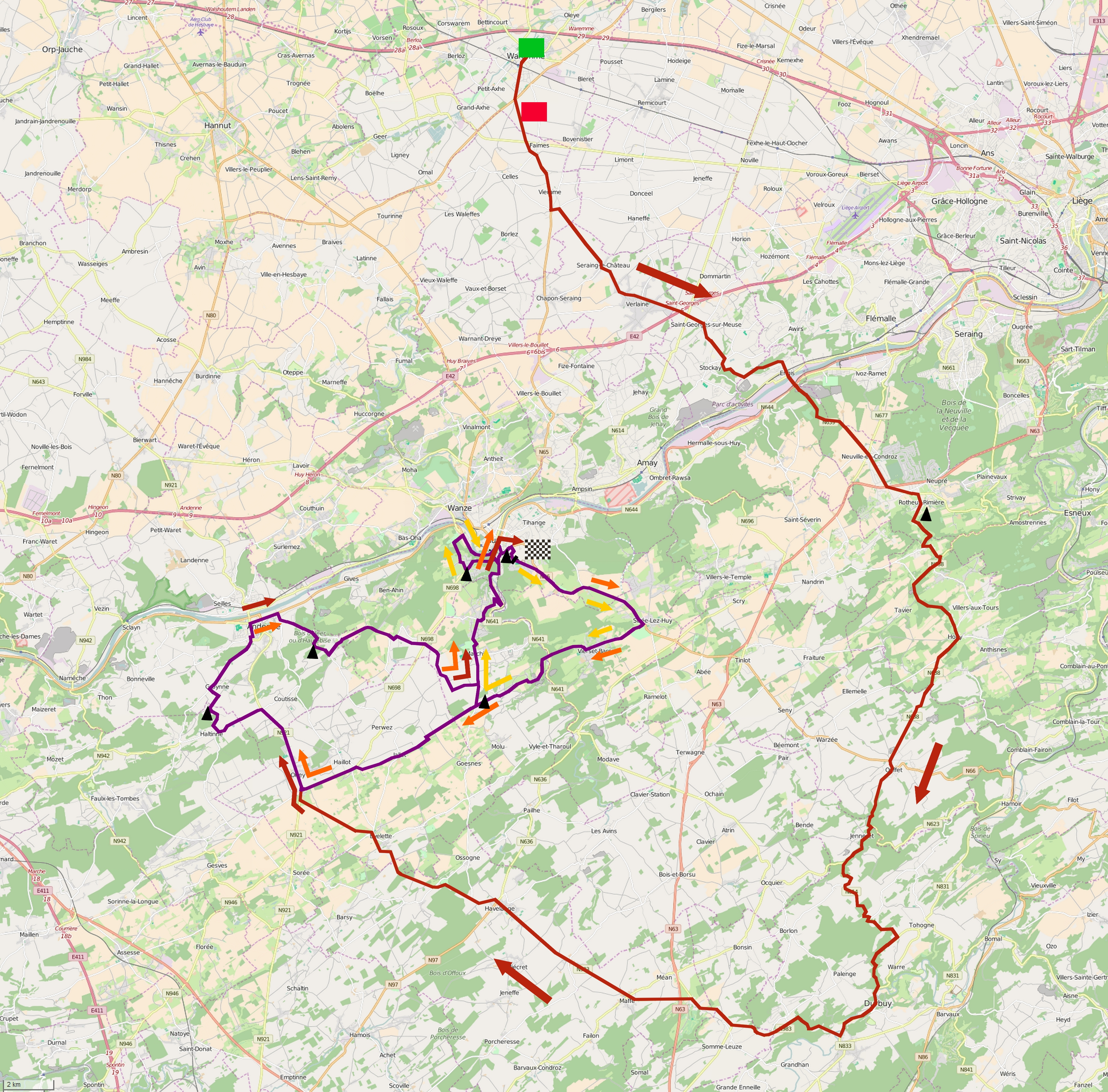
Route of the 2015 Flèche Wallonne

The race took place on a 205.5-kilometre (127.7-mile) route that started in Waremme and ended in Huy. The key aspect of La Flèche Wallonne was the climb of the Mur de Huy, which was crossed three times during the race; the finishing line was at the top of the final climb of the Mur. The race suited both puncheurs and climbers, and had added importance in 2015 because the second stage of the Tour de France, to be held in July, also finished on the Mur, so several riders rode the race as preparation.

Despite the addition of an additional climb late in the race, a group formed at the base of the Mur. Valverde won his third victory on the climb, with Julian Alaphilippe (Etixx–Quick-Step) second and Michael Albasini (Orica–GreenEDGE) third; Valverde went on to win Liège–Bastogne–Liège as well. La Flèche Wallonne was affected by many crashes, which caused the withdrawal of several of the favourites for race victory, including Philippe Gilbert (BMC Racing Team), Michael Morales (Cannondale–Garmin) and Chris Froome (Team Sky).

== Teams ==
La Flèche Wallonne was part of the UCI World Tour, which meant that the 17 UCI WorldTeams were automatically invited and obliged to send a team. The race organisers ASO, which also organised the Tour de France, made eight wildcard invitations to UCI Professional Continental teams. The peloton was therefore made up of 25 teams. Each team was required to enter between five and eight, so the maximum size of the peloton was 200 riders. MTN–Qhubeka and Team Roompot, however, only entered seven riders each, so 198 riders were entered into the race.

UCI WorldTeams

- AG2R La Mondiale
- Astana
- BMC Racing Team
- Etixx–Quick-Step
- FDJ
- IAM Cycling
- Lampre–Merida
- Lotto–Soudal
- Movistar Team
- Orica–GreenEDGE
- Cannondale–Garmin
- Team Giant–Alpecin
- Team Katusha
- LottoNL–Jumbo
- Team Sky
- Tinkoff–Saxo
- Trek Factory Racing

UCI Professional Continental teams

- Cofidis
- MTN–Qhubeka
- Team Europcar
- Team Roompot
- Topsport Vlaanderen–Baloise
- Wanty–Groupe Gobert
- Bretagne–Séché Environnement
- UnitedHealthcare

== Route ==
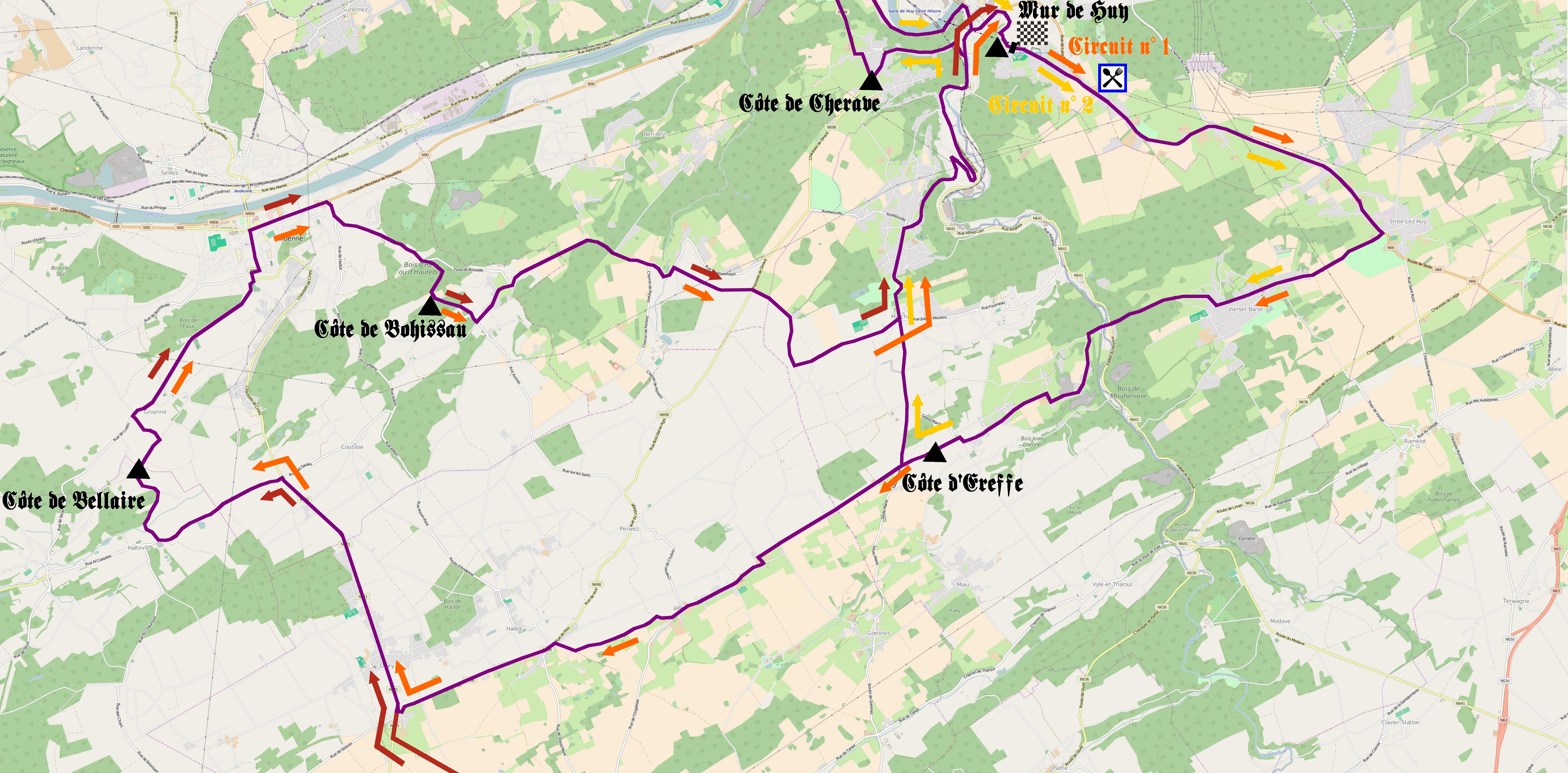
Local circuit of the 2015 Flèche Wallonne

The 205.5-kilometre (127.7-mile) route of the 2015 La Flèche Wallonne began in Waremme, Liège Province, on the Rue de Huy with a 2-kilometre (1.2-mile) neutralised zone. The first part of the route went south-east through Faimes and Saint-Georges-sur-Meuse before reaching the day's first climb, the Côte des 36 Tournants, after 22 kilometres (14 miles). After the climb, the riders continued south-east to Anthisnes; here the route turned south. It passed through Ouffet, then reached Durbuy after 55 kilometres (34 miles). The route then turned west to pass through Havelange before reaching Ohey after 84.5 kilometres (52.5 miles). The roads between the Côte des 36 Tournants and Ohey were not entirely flat, but there were no categorised climbs.

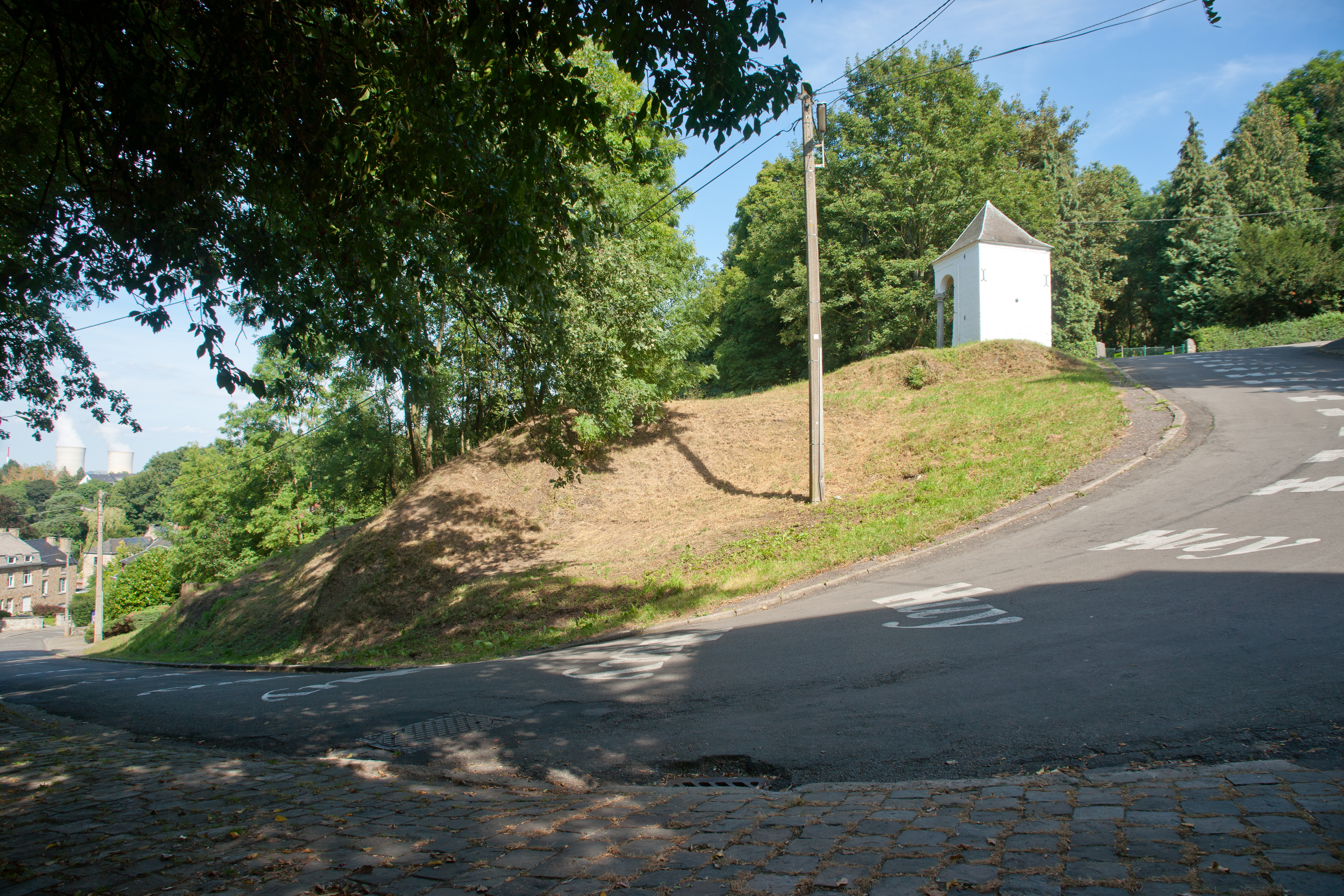
The Mur de Huy was climbed three times during the race. The finish line came at the top of the climb.

After reaching Ohey, the route entered a series of loops. The riders first travelled north, south-west and then north again to reach the day's second climb, the Côte de Bellaire, after 92 kilometres (57 miles) of racing. The route continued north to Andenne, then east to the third climb, the Côte de Bohissau, 100 kilometres (62 miles) into the race. The riders then rode north-east to reach the first ascent of the Mur de Huy. The first climb of the Mur came with 87.5 kilometres (54.4 miles) to the finish line; it was followed by the day's only feed zone. The peloton continued riding east as far as Modave, where the course turned to the south-west. The Côte d'Ereffe was climbed after 131 kilometres (81 miles) as the riders returned to Ohey. The race then used the same roads as before between Ohey and Huy, repeating the ascents of the Côte de Bellaire, the Côte de Bohissau and the Mur de Huy. The second and penultimate ascent of the Mur came with 29 kilometres (18 miles) remaining.

The final loop of the race followed the same roads as before, east out of Huy and then south-west to the Côte d'Ereffe, climbed with 16.5 kilometres (10.3 miles) remaining. After this climb, however, the route turned north to take a more direct route to Huy, though some of the same roads were used. Within the town, the riders were faced with a slightly different route and a climb new to the 2015 edition of the race, the Côte de Cherave. The roads before the climb were narrow and twisting, with a level crossing at the foot of the climb. The hill itself was 1,300 metres (4,300 ft) in length with an average gradient of 8.1%; the steepest section came in the first part. The top of the Côte de Cherave came with 5.5 kilometres (3.4 miles) to the finish line and was followed by a sharp right-hand turn and a fast descent back into Huy.

The crucial part of the race was the final 1,300-metre (4,300 ft) climb of the Mur de Huy, with an average gradient of 9.6%. The first 400-metre (1,300 ft) section of the climb had a gradient less than 7%; after this it increased to about 10%. The steepest section came after 800 metres (2,600 ft) with an S-bend. The steepest part of the climb had a gradient of about 24%; many past races have been won with attacks at this point. The finish line came at the very top of the climb.

== Pre-race favourites ==
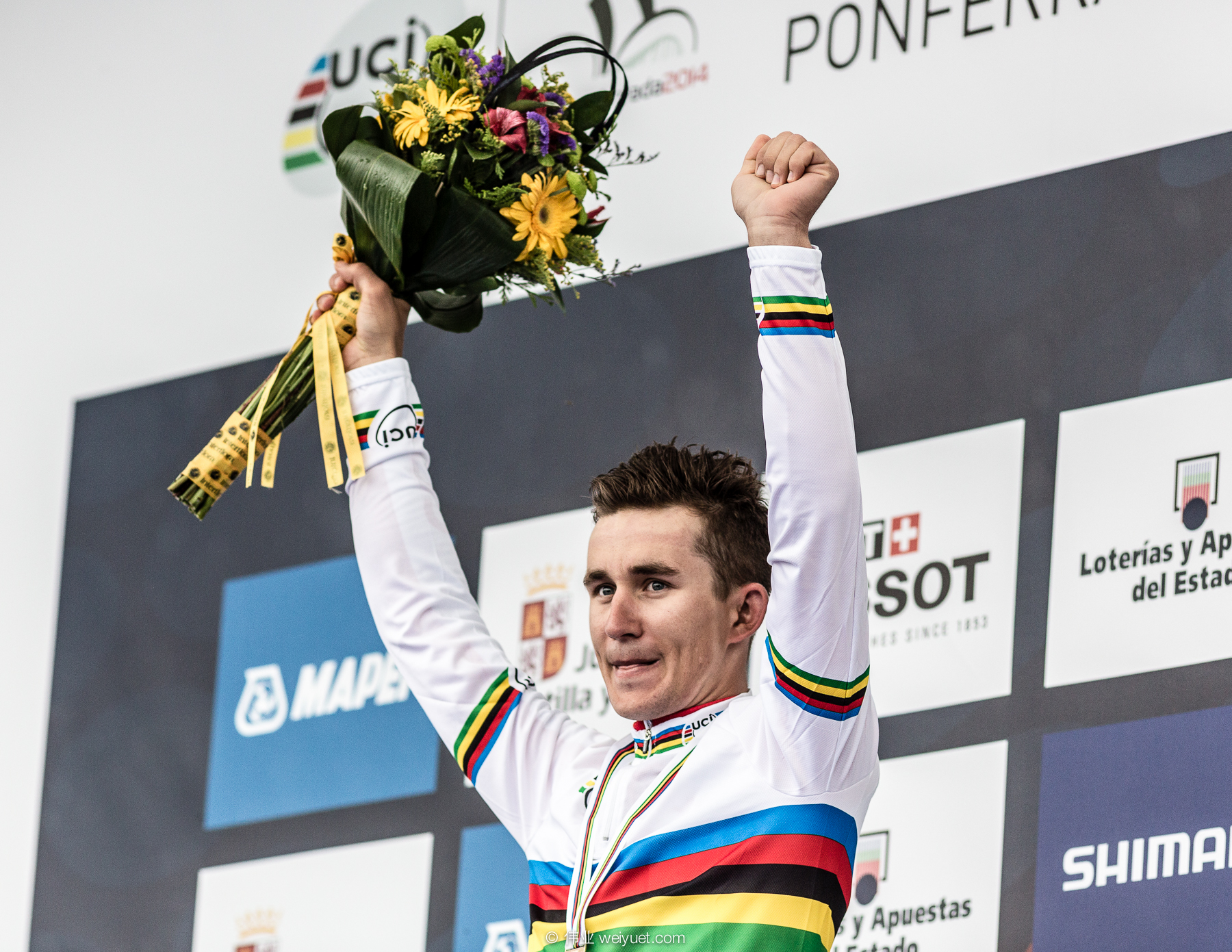
Michał Kwiatkowski, photographed here after winning the 2014 World Championships, was one of the favourites for race victory

Recent editions of the race had been decided with attacks on the Mur de Huy. The addition of the Côte de Cherave, however, added an unknown factor into the race: it was considered much more likely than in previous years that a group of riders could break away from the peloton on the penultimate climb and hold an advantage to the finish line. No breakaway had won La Flèche Wallonne since 2003.

The strongest favourite for the race victory was Alejandro Valverde (Movistar Team), who was the defending champion and who had also won the race in 2006. Valverde had shown good form by coming second in the Amstel Gold Race behind Michał Kwiatkowski (Etixx–Quick-Step); Valverde was expected to have an advantage on the steep climb of the Mur, though Kwiatkowski was still among the favourites for victory.

Three other former winners entered the 2015 race. These were Philippe Gilbert (BMC Racing Team), who had won the race in 2011; Joaquim Rodríguez (Team Katusha), who had won in 2012; and Daniel Moreno (Team Katusha), who had won in 2013. All of them were well suited to the steep final climb. Other riders considered to have a chance of victory included Dan Martin (Cannondale–Garmin), Sergio Henao (Team Sky) and several other climbers and puncheurs.

As the third stage of the Tour de France was scheduled to finish on exactly the same roads, several riders who were aiming at success there rode La Flèche Wallonne as preparation. These included Chris Froome (Team Sky), Vincenzo Nibali (Astana) and Nairo Quintana (Movistar Team).

== Race report ==
=== Early stages ===
A breakaway formed within the first 10 kilometres (6.2 miles) of racing. There were seven riders in the break: Thomas De Gendt (Lotto–Soudal), Mike Teunissen (LottoNL–Jumbo), Brice Feillu (Bretagne–Séché Environnement), Jérôme Baugnies (Wanty–Groupe Gobert), Reinier Honig (Team Roompot), Daniele Ratto (UnitedHealthcare), and Pieter Vanspeybrouck (Topsport Vlaanderen–Baloise). The breakaway initially built an eight-minute lead, with De Gendt leading the group over the climbs. The main peloton was led principally by the Movistar Team and Team Katusha.

The first major action of the race occurred as the riders approached the first ascent of the Mur de Huy. Dan Martin, one of the favourites for the race, touched wheels with Tiago Machado (Team Katusha) and both riders crashed. Martin returned to his bike and chased back to the peloton with the help of several teammates, but later withdrew. He had hit his head in the crash and wished to recover ahead of Liège–Bastogne–Liège the following weekend. Several other riders were caught up or delayed, including Chris Froome. At the top of the first ascent of the Mur de Huy, the breakaway's lead had been cut to under six minutes.

After the riders left Huy, Team Sky came to the front of the peloton with Peter Kennaugh; his riding at the front of the bunch reduced the gap to under five minutes. Honig and Teunissen were dropped from the leading group on the second climb of the Côte de Bellaire. Team Katusha and the Movistar Team were joined at the front of the peloton by Etixx–Quick-Step as the race returned towards Huy.

=== Final loops around Huy ===
Another crash followed before the climb; this crash was caused by riders bunching together on a road made narrower by parked cars on either side. The most significant rider caught in this crash was Philippe Gilbert; others were Julián Arredondo and Bob Jungels (both Trek Factory Racing). Gilbert got up slowly, with his shorts and jersey ripped. He abandoned shortly afterwards. The next significant crash came with 40 kilometres (25 miles) remaining. This took out Lars Petter Nordhaug and Wout Poels (Team Sky), Ben King (Cannondale–Garmin), Amaël Moinard (BMC Racing Team) and Anthony Roux (FDJ). Poels ended up stuck in a ditch for some time with Roux injured on top of him. Another crash happened shortly afterwards, involving Jelle Vanendert (Lotto–Soudal), Alexey Tsatevich (Team Katusha) and Kévin Reza (FDJ).

On the penultimate climb of the Mur, the breakaway split; only De Gendt and Baugnies remained in the lead, 50 seconds ahead of the peloton. Giovanni Visconti (Movistar Team) and Luis León Sánchez (Astana) attacked the peloton on the climb and joined De Gendt and Baugnies soon afterwards, while Etixx–Quick-Step and Team Katusha led the chase in the peloton. Tejay van Garderen (BMC Racing Team) attacked on the Col d'Ereffe, while Visconti and Sánchez soon dropped De Gendt and Baugnies. De Gendt helped his teammate Louis Vervaeke bridge up to Van Garderen. Vervaeke, Van Garderen and Baugnies combined briefly, but were unable to catch the leading pair and were themselves caught by the peloton with 13.4 kilometres (8.3 miles) remaining.

=== Race finale ===
Visconti and Sánchez continued in the lead; they had 20 seconds lead with 12 kilometres (7.5 miles) left. At this point, another crash occurred in the peloton. This included several IAM Cycling riders, Samuel Sánchez (BMC Racing Team), Bryan Coquard (Team Europcar) and Froome. Froome suffered cuts on his left side, with blood visible through rips on his shorts. He continued to the end of the race, however, and reached the finish line in 123rd place, over 12 minutes behind the leaders.

As the peloton headed towards the penultimate climb, the Côte de Cherave, Huub Duyn (Team Roompot) attacked but was unable to build a lead, with Tony Martin leading the peloton on behalf of Kwiatkowski. On the climb, Vincenzo Nibali attacked; he could not build a gap to the group, but did bring them closer to Visconti and Sánchez. Soon afterwards, Tim Wellens (Lotto–Soudal) attacked, catching and passing the leading pair. Giampaolo Caruso (Team Katusha) attempted to follow; he was unable to join Wellens and was recaptured by the pack soon afterwards.

Wellens had a 14-second lead at the foot of the final climb of the Mur de Huy. The peloton was led by Lampre–Merida for the first part of the ascent. The peloton stayed together for most of the climb, with no rider escaping on the steep sections. In the final few hundred metres, however, Valverde came to the front of the group. He wound the pace up gradually before sprinting within sight of the line. He took the race victory with a significant gap to the riders behind. Julian Alaphilippe (Etixx–Quick-Step) finished in second place, with Michael Albasini (Orica–GreenEDGE) third.

== Result ==
Result
Rank	Rider	Team	Time
1	Alejandro Valverde (ESP)	Movistar Team	5h 08' 22"
2	Julian Alaphilippe (FRA)	Etixx–Quick-Step	+ 0"
3	Michael Albasini (SUI)	Orica–GreenEDGE	+ 0"
4	Joaquim Rodríguez (ESP)	Team Katusha	+ 0"
5	Daniel Moreno (ESP)	Team Katusha	+ 0"
6	Alexis Vuillermoz (FRA)	AG2R La Mondiale	+ 4"
7	Sergio Henao (COL)	Team Sky	+ 4"
8	Jakob Fuglsang (DEN)	Astana	+ 4"
9	Tom-Jelte Slagter (NED)	Cannondale–Garmin	+ 4"
10	Wilco Kelderman (NED)	LottoNL–Jumbo	+ 4"

== After the race ==
=== Reactions ===
The race was described afterwards as "an incredibly boring race" by Cycling Weekly. Valverde, however, said that it was "dangerous", with all the crashes happening at the front of the peloton, and that it was "the most nervous race I can remember doing". The 2015 race was his third victory in La Flèche Wallonne, bringing him level with Eddy Merckx; Valverde described this as a "great honour". His aim after the race was to win a third victory at Liège–Bastogne–Liège, which he succeeded in doing.

Alaphilippe said after the race that he had not been intending to go for the sprint at the end of the race; the team's plan was to set up Kwiatkowski. He started sprinting only after his directeur sportif shouted "go, go" at him over the radio. Alaphilippe said that he had briefly thought that he was going to win the sprint; his second-place finish was, however, the most important result of his career so far. He said, "For my first time performance here, I can't help but be pleased." Albasini's third place was better than his team had expected: before the race, Orica–GreenEDGE's directeur sportif Matt White had not expected him to be as strong because of the addition of the extra climb. Albasini himself also described the race as "a lot tenser"; he also said that Valverde was "one of the strongest guys in those kinds of finishes".

One of the consequences of the high number of crashes in the race was a number of injuries to several prominent riders. These included Dan Martin, who was left with "contusions, abrasions and soreness in his neck"; Martin himself described himself as suffering from whiplash and as feeling "crappy", though he still intended to start Liège–Bastogne–Liège. Philippe Gilbert likewise described his crash as "not the best preparation" and planned a trip to an osteopath to help his recovery. Chris Froome did not suffer any significant injuries but did not plan to start in Liège; he went instead to do reconnaissance of the cobbled stage of the Tour de France and his next scheduled race was the following week at the Tour de Romandie.

=== UCI World Tour rankings ===
Riders who finished in the top ten in La Flèche Wallonne were awarded points in the UCI World Tour rankings. Valverde, as the race winner, won 80 points; Kelderman won 2 points for his tenth-place finish. Valverde moved from eighth to second place in the rankings; his 238 points left him 65 points behind Richie Porte, the leader of the ranking. Joaquim Rodríguez also moved up in the rankings from sixteenth to ninth place. Spain remained in second place in the nations' rankings, one point behind Australia, with Colombia moving ahead of the Netherlands into third place and France returning to the top 10. Etixx–Quick-Step retained their lead in the teams' rankings.

UCI World Tour individual rankings
Rank	Rider	Team	Points
1	Richie Porte (AUS)	Team Sky	303
2	Alejandro Valverde (ESP)	Movistar Team	238
3	Alexander Kristoff (NOR)	Team Katusha	237
4	John Degenkolb (GER)	Team Giant–Alpecin	232
5	Michał Kwiatkowski (POL)	Etixx–Quick-Step	195
6	Geraint Thomas (GBR)	Team Sky	184
7	Greg Van Avermaet (BEL)	BMC Racing Team	178
8	Nairo Quintana (COL)	Movistar Team	168
9	Joaquim Rodríguez (ESP)	Team Katusha	160
10	Zdeněk Štybar (CZE)	Etixx–Quick-Step	152
Source: UCI
