= 2015 Liège–Bastogne–Liège =

2015 UCI World Tour, race 13 of 28
- The riders on the podium after the race (from left to right: Julian Alaphilippe, Alejandro Valverde and Joaquim Rodríguez)

Race details
- Dates: 26 April 2015
- Distance: 253 km (157 mi)
- Winning time: 6h 14' 20"

Results
	Winner	Alejandro Valverde (ESP)	(Movistar Team)
	Second	Julian Alaphilippe (FRA)	(Etixx–Quick-Step)
	Third	Joaquim Rodríguez (ESP)	(Team Katusha)

The 2015 Liège–Bastogne–Liège was a one-day cycling classic that took place in the Belgian Ardennes on 26 April 2015. It was the 101st edition of the Liège–Bastogne–Liège one-day cycling race and was the fourth cycling monument of the 2015 season. It was part of the 2015 UCI World Tour and was organised by the Amaury Sport Organisation (ASO), the organisers of the Tour de France.

200 riders raced over a 253-kilometre (157-mile) route that started in Liège, travelled south to Bastogne, then returned north by an indirect route to finish in Ans on the outskirts of Liège. The route included many hills, especially in the final 70 kilometres (43 miles), which were the principal difficulty in the race.

There were many attacks in the final part of the race, with several groups breaking away from the peloton and subsequently being caught. A small group came together on the final ascent to the finish line, where the race was decided in a sprint. It was won by the pre-race favourite, Alejandro Valverde (Movistar Team), ahead of Julian Alaphilippe (Etixx–Quick-Step) and Joaquim Rodríguez (Team Katusha). This was Valverde's third victory in Liège–Bastogne–Liège and put him into the lead of the World Tour standings.

== Background ==
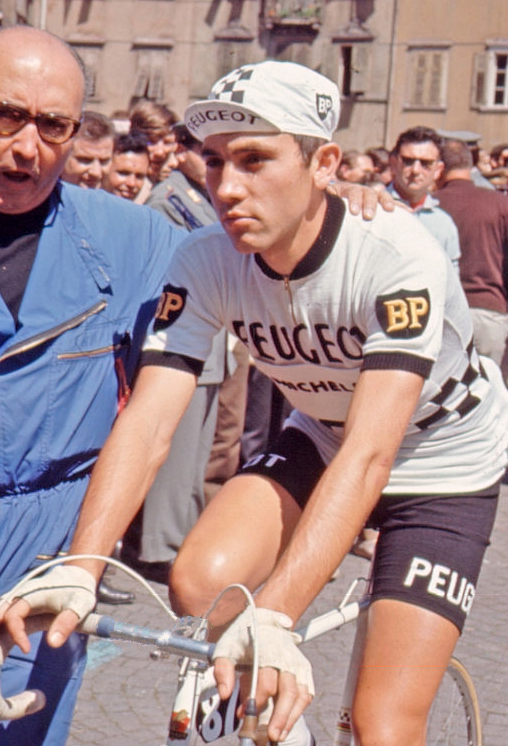
Eddy Merckx, photographed here during the 1967 Giro d'Italia, holds the record for the most wins in Liège–Bastogne–Liège.

Liège–Bastogne–Liège, one of the oldest races on the cycling calendar, was established in 1892. Milano–Torino is the only current race to have begun earlier, although it did not exist as a regular event until the 1920s. Liège–Bastogne–Liège was founded as a precursor to a planned Liège–Paris–Liège event, which never came about, but eventually became one of the most important races on the cycling calendar in its own right. The race is seen as one of the cycling Monuments, alongside Milan–San Remo, the Tour of Flanders, Paris–Roubaix and the Giro di Lombardia. Because Liège–Bastogne–Liège is the oldest of the major races on the cycling calendar, it has the nickname La Doyenne (English: The Old Lady). It is particularly known as a race where the best one-day riders and the best Grand Tour riders can compete on relatively equal terms. In his book The Monuments, Peter Cossins wrote that Liège–Bastogne–Liège "is generally regarded as the toughest one-day race on the calendar". Eddy Merckx holds the record for the most victories, with five wins between 1969 and 1975.

Liège–Bastogne–Liège was the fourth of the Monuments to take place in the 2015 season. Milan–San Remo and Paris–Roubaix were won by John Degenkolb (Team Giant–Alpecin), while the Tour of Flanders was won by Alexander Kristoff (Team Katusha). Liège–Bastogne–Liège was the final event of the spring classics season and came as the conclusion to the Ardennes classics, following the Amstel Gold Race and La Flèche Wallonne. It was also part of the 2015 UCI World Tour, a season-long competition that included both one-day events and stage races.

== Teams ==
As it was part of the UCI World Tour, the 17 UCI WorldTeams were automatically invited and obliged to send a team to Liège–Bastogne–Liège. The race organisers ASO, the organisers of the Tour de France, also made eight wildcard invitations to UCI Professional Continental teams. The peloton was therefore made up of 25 teams. Six of the teams were also invited to La Flèche Wallonne. These included two Belgian teams (Wanty–Groupe Gobert and Topsport Vlaanderen–Baloise), two French teams (Cofidis and Team Europcar), Team Roompot and MTN–Qhubeka. The final two teams to be invited to Liège–Bastogne–Liège were Bora–Argon 18 (whose invitation meant that they would participate in all five Monuments in 2015) and Cult Energy Pro Cycling. As each team was required to enter between five and eight riders, the maximum size of the peloton was 200 riders.

UCI WorldTeams

- AG2R La Mondiale
- Astana
- BMC Racing Team
- Etixx–Quick-Step
- FDJ
- IAM Cycling
- Lampre–Merida
- Lotto–Soudal
- Movistar Team
- Orica–GreenEDGE
- Cannondale–Garmin
- Team Giant–Alpecin
- Team Katusha
- LottoNL–Jumbo
- Team Sky
- Tinkoff–Saxo
- Trek Factory Racing

UCI Professional Continental teams

- Cofidis
- MTN–Qhubeka
- Team Europcar
- Team Roompot
- Topsport Vlaanderen–Baloise
- Wanty–Groupe Gobert
- Bretagne–Séché Environnement
- UnitedHealthcare

== Route ==
Profile of the 2015 Liège–Bastogne–Liège

The route for the 2015 race was announced on 15 April. The route was 10 kilometres (6.2 miles) shorter than in 2014; it was therefore 253 kilometres (157 miles) in length. The changes came in the final section of the route, with the Côte de la Vecquée removed and the Col du Rosier and the Col du Maquisard added instead. The second change was a reduction in distance between the third-last and second-last climbs: the distance was cut from 25 kilometres (16 miles) to 16 kilometres (9.9 miles), with a small unclassified climb also added. Cyclingnews.com described the first change as a "much harder combination" suggested that the new route would make the race more interesting than the 2014 edition, which it described as "painfully dull".

The race began in Liège, in Place Saint-Lambert outside the Prince-Bishops' Palace, with a neutral zone that took the riders out of the town to the south. The first 75 kilometres (47 miles) of the race brought the peloton south, through Aywaille to La Roche-en-Ardenne; although the roads were not flat there were no difficult or categorised climbs. Here the riders encountered the first classified climb of the day, the Côte de la Roche-en-Ardenne, a 2.8-kilometre (1.7-mile) climb at an average gradient of 6.2%. After reaching the summit, the riders continued south for another 28 kilometres (17 miles). This took them through Bertogne to Bastogne, which they reached after 107 kilometres (66 miles) of racing. This was the turning-point: from here the route turned to the north to return towards Liège. The northern leg of the race was both longer – 146 kilometres (91 miles) – and more difficult – it included nine categorised climbs.

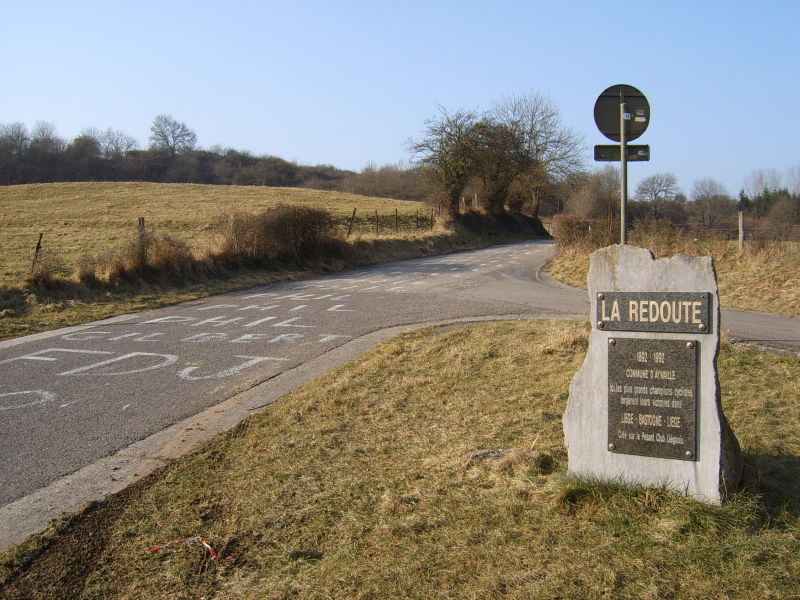
The Côte de La Redoute, photographed in 2007. Messages from fans to the riders can be seen painted on the road.

After turning around at the Rond-point La Doyenne (named after the race itself), the peloton left Bastogne to the north-east. The first 17 kilometres (11 miles) were fairly flat and took the riders to Houffalize. After a fast descent came the Côte de Saint-Roch, an 11.2% average climb over its 1-kilometre (0.62-mile) length. Another fairly flat section followed: the route continued north for approximately 30 kilometres (19 miles) on fairly major roads through Gouvy and Vielsalm. At this point, with 86.5 kilometres (53.7 miles) to the finish line, there were still eight categorised climbs remaining.

The first three of these climbs came in quick succession. These were the Côte de Wanne (2.7 kilometres (1.7 miles) at 7.4%), the Côte de Stockeu (1 kilometre (0.62 miles) at 12.5%) and the Côte de la Haute-Levée (3.6 kilometres (2.2 miles) at 5.6%). The Côte de Wanne was narrow and badly surfaced, with a dangerous descent following. The Côte de Stockeu was described by Cycling Weekly as a "killer climb", because of its steep gradient, its narrowness and its poor road surface. The Côte de la Haute-Levée was unique on the course because it included a 500 metres (1,600 ft) section of cobblestones.

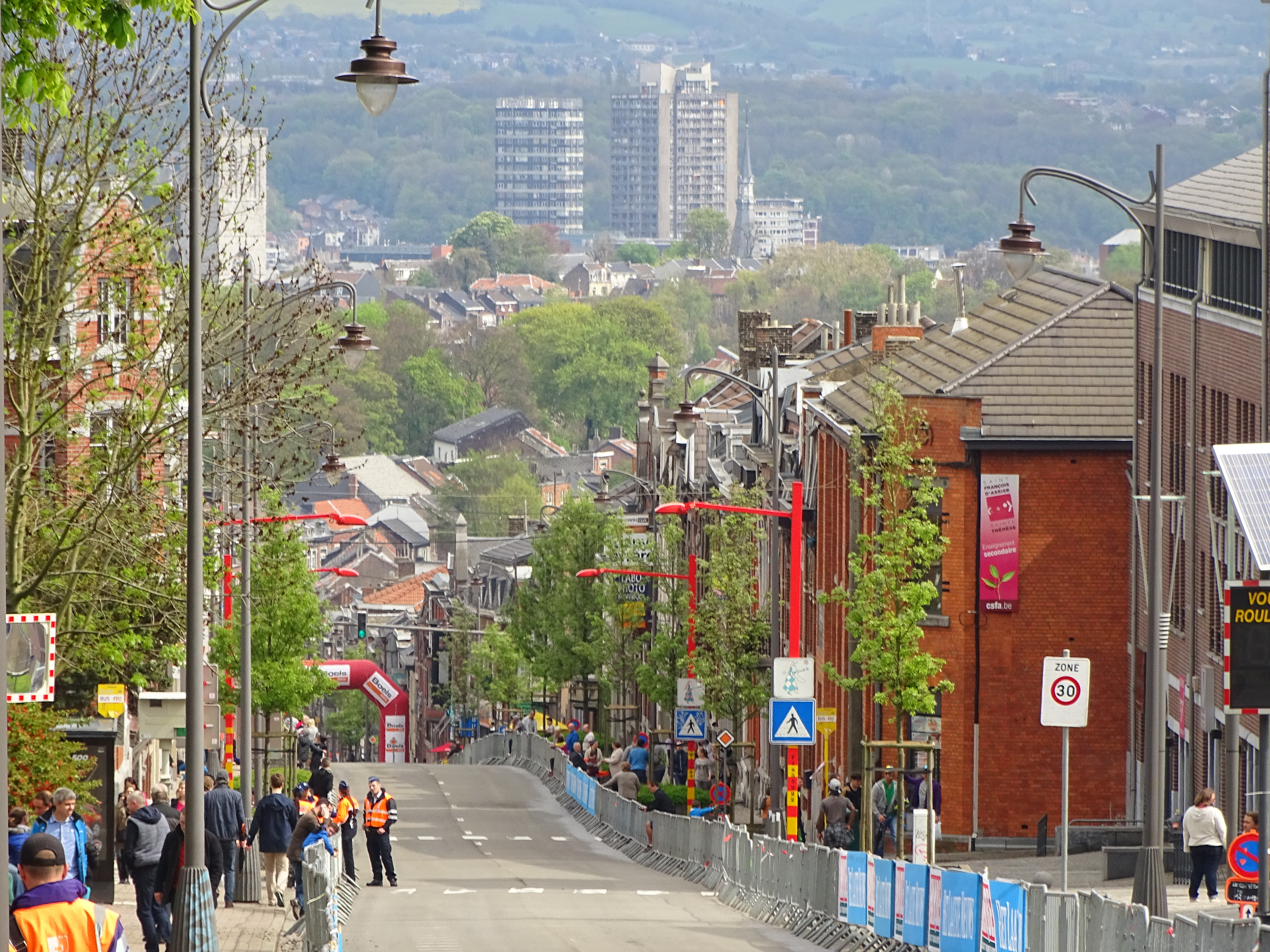
The view from the top of the final climb in Ans. The flamme rouge can be seen in the background.

These climbs brought the riders to Stavelot. Soon afterwards, there was a hairpin turn that took them towards the two climbs new to the 2015 edition. The first of these was the Col du Rosier (4.4 kilometres (2.7 miles) at 5.9%), which was the longest climb of the day. The riders then descended through the town of Spa and turned west onto the Col du Maquisard (2.5 kilometres (1.6 miles) at 5%), which they crossed with 46 kilometres (29 miles) to the finish line. The route then crossed over the roads used for the southern leg as the riders entered the final section of the race.

The following climb was the Côte de La Redoute (2 kilometres (1.2 miles) at 8.9%), with 34.5 kilometres (21.4 miles) from the summit to the finish line. Cyclingnews.com described La Redoute as "the most emblematic climb of the entire race". It had an uneven gradient: the first 1 kilometre (0.62 miles) was at about 8%, before 500 metres (1,600 ft) at around 13% and another 500 metres (1,600 ft) at 6%. The riders descended down twisting roads, crossed over the uncategorised Côte de Sprimont, before coming to the penultimate climb, the Côte de la Roche-aux-Faucons (1.5 kilometres (0.93 miles) at 9.4%) with 19 kilometres (12 miles) to the finish line. This was one of the most difficult climbs of the race, with frequent changes of gradient and a poor road surface. There was then another uncategorised climb and a steep descent into the outskirts of Liège.

The final climb of the day came with 6.2 kilometres (3.9 miles) remaining. This was the Côte de Saint-Nicolas (1.2 kilometres (0.75 miles) at 8.6%). Cycling Weekly described it as "a succession of steep corners with nothing between". After the descent from the climb, the riders entered Ans, the finishing town. There was a long, straight road that started 2 kilometres (1.2 miles) from the finish line. After 500 metres (1,600 ft) of flat, the road climbed towards the finish at around 5%. With around 300 metres (980 feet) to go, there was a left-hand turn that took the riders to the finish line.

== Pre-race favourites ==
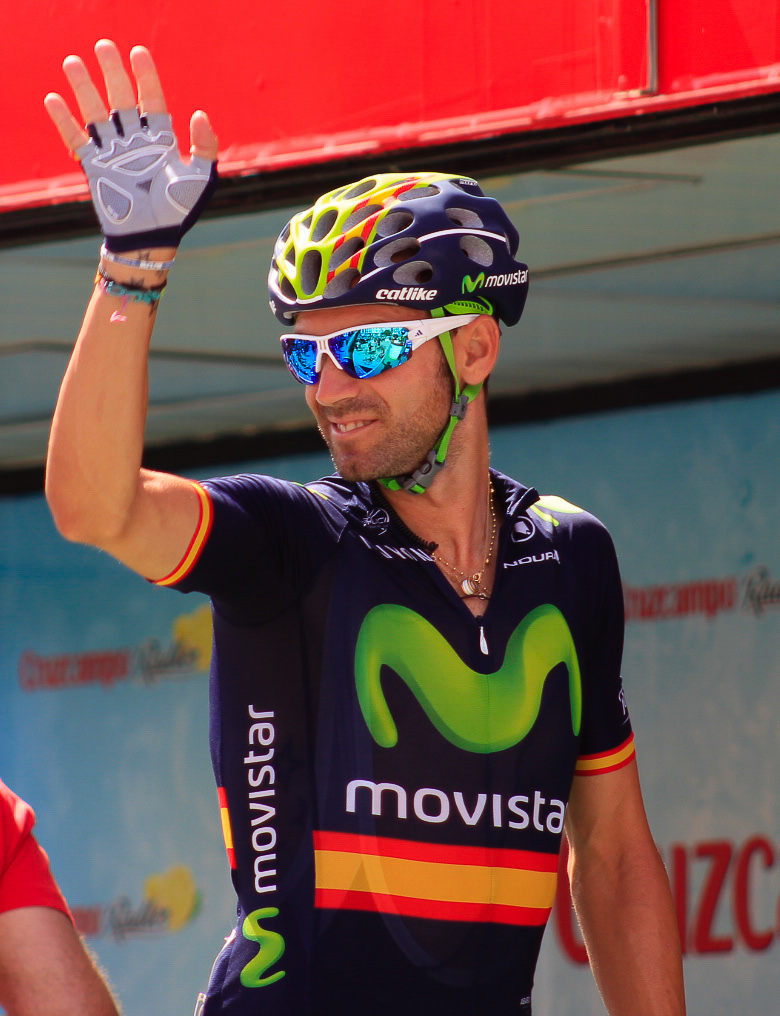
Alejandro Valverde (Movistar Team) was one of the principal favourites for the race victory (photographed later in the season at the Vuelta a España).

Recent editions of Liège–Bastogne–Liège had been won in several different ways. Andy Schleck (then riding for Team Saxo Bank) had won a solo victory with a long-distance attack in 2009, while Dan Martin (Cannondale–Garmin) had attacked late on to win in 2013. The 2010 edition was won by a two-man breakaway and the 2011 edition by a three-man group. The defending champion, Simon Gerrans (Orica–GreenEDGE) won the 2014 edition in a bunch sprint after a large group came to Ans together. The pattern of the 2015 edition was therefore hard to predict. One consistent pattern, however, was that recent editions of the race had been won by major names rather than by outsiders.

Alejandro Valverde (Movistar Team) had won La Flèche Wallonne during the week that preceded Liège–Bastogne–Liège and he was one of the major favourites to take the victory. Valverde had won the race on two previous occasions (in 2006 and 2008) and had also been on the podium on four other occasions. Valverde's status as the major favourite had the potential to work against him, however, as other riders were expected to mark him closely and perhaps prevent him from winning. Philippe Gilbert (BMC Racing Team) had suffered from this problem in the Amstel Gold Race.

The other major favourite for the race was the reigning world champion, Michał Kwiatkowski (Etixx–Quick-Step). Kwiatkowski had finished third in the 2014 Liège–Bastogne–Liège and had already won the Amstel Gold Race in 2015. Although he had not been as strong as had been expected in La Flèche Wallonne, the longer climbs of Liège–Bastogne–Liège were expected to suit him better.

Other favourites included Martin, Joaquim Rodríguez (Team Katusha), Rui Costa (Lampre–Merida), as well as Vincenzo Nibali (Astana) and Tim Wellens (Lotto–Soudal). Gerrans had suffered an injury earlier in the season and had not fully recovered; he was not expected to be able to defend his title. Similarly, Gilbert had suffered a fall in La Flèche Wallonne; he was also not as well suited to the route of Liège–Bastogne–Liège as he was to the other Ardennes classics.

== Race report ==
The race began with hard racing for the first hour until the day's main breakaway was formed, with around 40 kilometres (25 miles) raced. The breakaway involved eight riders. These were Diego Ulissi (Lampre–Merida), Matteo Montaguti (AG2R La Mondiale), Otto Vergaerde (Topsport Vlaanderen–Baloise), Clément Chevrier (IAM Cycling), Marco Minnaard (Wanty–Groupe Gobert), Anthony Turgis (Cofidis), Cesare Benedetti (Bora–Argon 18) and Rasmus Quaade (Cult Energy Pro Cycling). The group's lead soon extended to nearly eight minutes, while the peloton was led by Team Europcar; their work reduced the breakaway's lead by around three minutes by the time of the Côte de La Roche-en-Ardenne, 79 kilometres (49 miles) into the race.

After the turn in Bastogne, the breakaway continued. It was, however, reduced in numbers, as Quaade, Chevrier and Vergaerde all fell back before the peloton reached the Côte de Wanne, four hours into the race. Team Katusha led the peloton as it approached the climb. On the climb itself, Astana came to the front of the peloton and led the chase, with the breakaway's lead reduced to under a minute. On the Côte de Stockeu, Andriy Hrivko (Astana), Gorka Izagirre (Movistar Team) and Simon Yates (Orica–GreenEDGE) attacked and joined the lead group; more riders then bridged across to form a 21-man group. This included five Astana riders, though not Nibali. On the Côte de la Haute-Levée, several riders attacked again to form a smaller breakaway; these were Tanel Kangert and Michele Scarponi (both Astana), Manuele Boaro (Tinkoff–Saxo), Esteban Chaves (Orica–GreenEDGE) and Julián Arredondo (Trek Factory Racing). They had a 25-second lead at the summit and, although Boaro and Arredondo were dropped on the Col du Rosier, this increased to more than a minute for a short while. It was reduced to 45 seconds on the Col du Maquisard, however, as the Movistar Team worked hard in the peloton to bring them back.

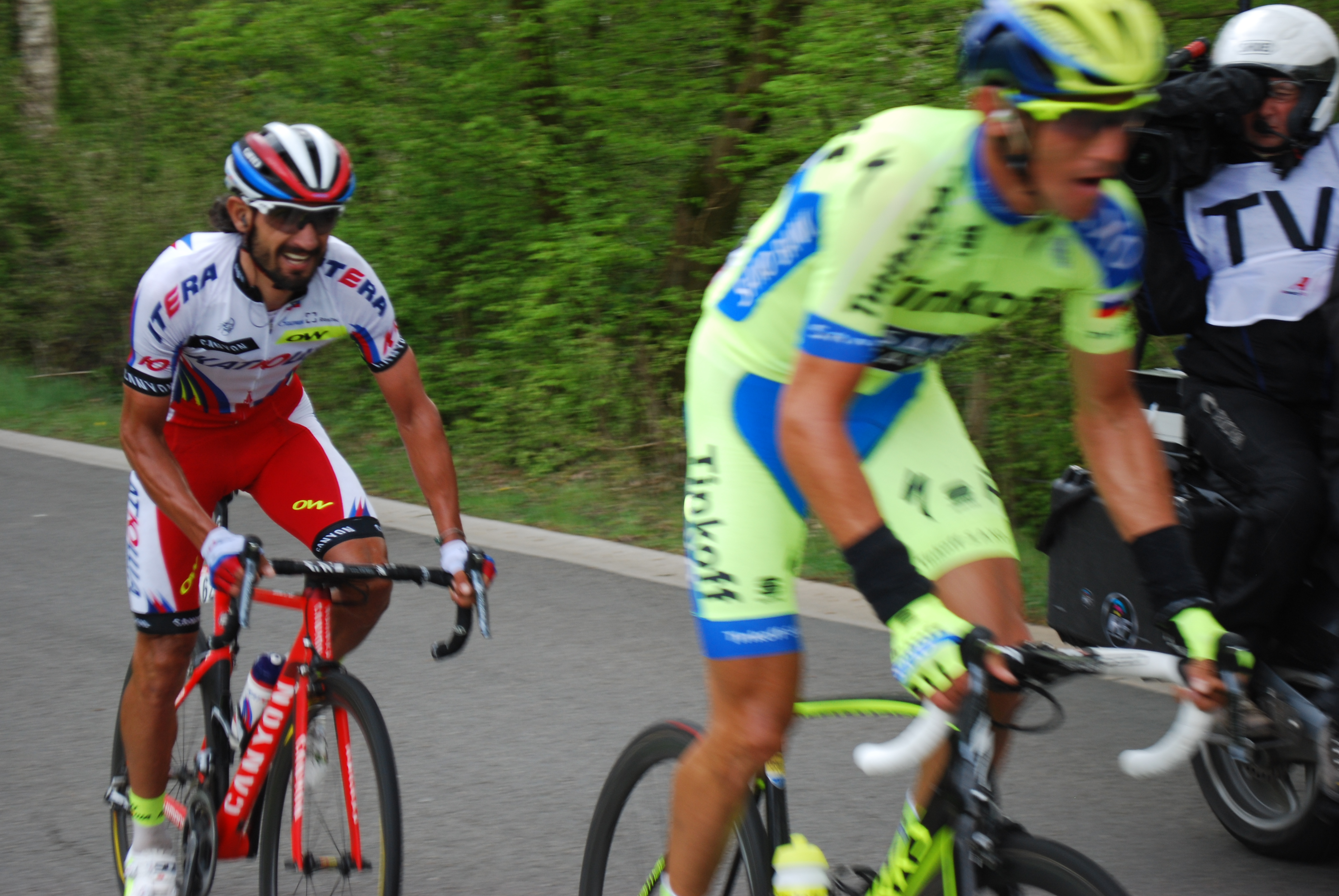
Giampaolo Caruso (left) and Roman Kreuziger riding in a breakaway on the Côte de la Roche-aux-Faucons.

As the peloton approached the Côte de la Redoute, there was a large crash. Among the riders to crash were two previous winners of the race, Dan Martin and Simon Gerrans, as well as Fränk Schleck (Trek Factory Racing), Nicolas Roche (Team Sky), Mathias Frank (IAM Cycling) and Yukiya Arashiro (Team Europcar). Vincenzo Nibali was forced to unclip himself from his bike, but avoided crashing. The peloton was reduced to around 40 riders at the foot of the climb. Although there were no bad injuries in the crash, Roche and Arashiro took some time to stand up, with Roche looking particularly dazed. Many of the riders who crashed attempted to get back into the peloton, with Gerrans and Martin among them. Gerrans was forced to abandon the race shortly afterwards after he crashed for a second time.

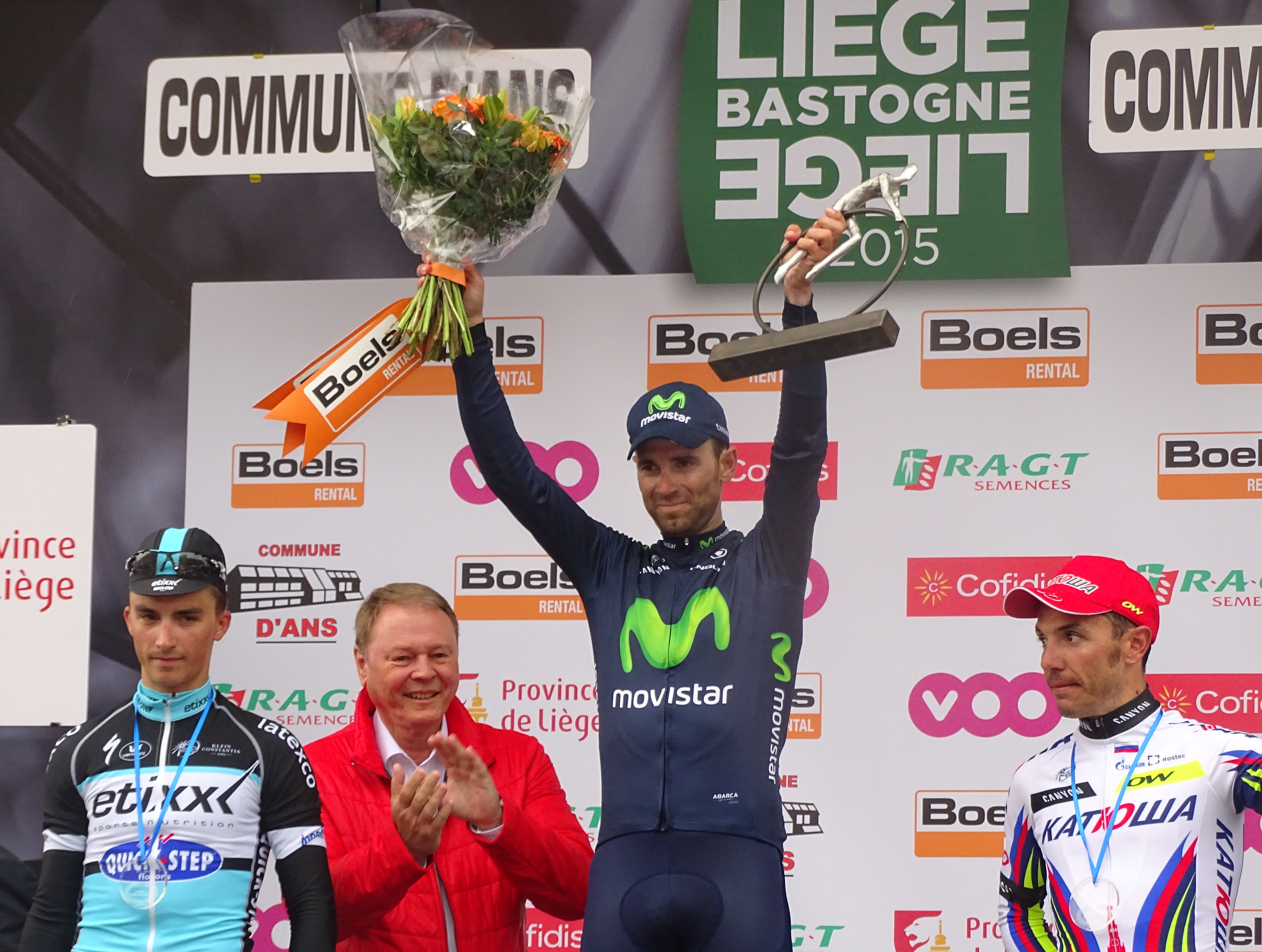
Alejandro Valverde (Movistar Team) (centre) receiving the winner's trophy, with Julian Alaphilippe (left) and Joaquim Rodríguez.

On the Col de la Redoute itself, Kangert was dropped from the breakaway; Scarponi and Chaves had a 35-second lead at the summit and were caught around 10 kilometres (6 mi) later. The riders then entered the Côte de la Roche-aux-Faucons, where Roman Kreuziger (Tinkoff–Saxo) and Giampaolo Caruso (Team Katusha) attacked; they were quickly joined by Jakob Fuglsang (Astana) and had an 18-second lead at the summit. Several riders attempted to form chase groups; eventually a six-man chase group was formed by Giovanni Visconti (Movistar Team), Julian Alaphilippe (Etixx–Quick-Step), Rui Costa (Lampre–Merida), Samuel Sánchez (BMC Racing Team) and Daniel Moreno (Team Katusha). They stayed away for a short while and were then joined by around 20 other riders with 15 kilometres (9.3 miles) remaining as rain began to fall.

Zdeněk Štybar (Etixx–Quick-Step) took over the pace-setting in the peloton as it approached the Côte de Saint-Nicolas and he reduced the gap to Kreuziger, Caruso and Fuglsang. On the climb, Valverde came to the front of the group to control the pace. Nibali then attacked and, while he was not able to escape the group, several riders were dropped. These included Michał Kwiatkowski and Philippe Gilbert. Nibali's attack also brought the chasing group back to the leaders. The next attack came from Romain Bardet (AG2R La Mondiale) on the descent from the Côte de Saint-Nicolas. While he too was unable to break away from the group, his attack did cause Nibali to lose contact and reduced the group to ten riders. Giampaolo Caruso led the group into Ans and towards the climb to the finish. At the foot of the climb, Daniel Moreno, Caruso's teammate, attacked and built a small gap ahead of the group. The group did not initially chase him, as all the other riders looked for Valverde to do the work. Eventually Valverde did start to chase Moreno and caught him at the final bend. He opened his sprint from a long way out, with Joaquim Rodríguez (Team Katusha) right behind him. Rodríguez slowed as they approached the line, however, and Valverde took the victory. Julian Alaphilippe came around Rodríguez in the final metres to take second place.

== Result ==
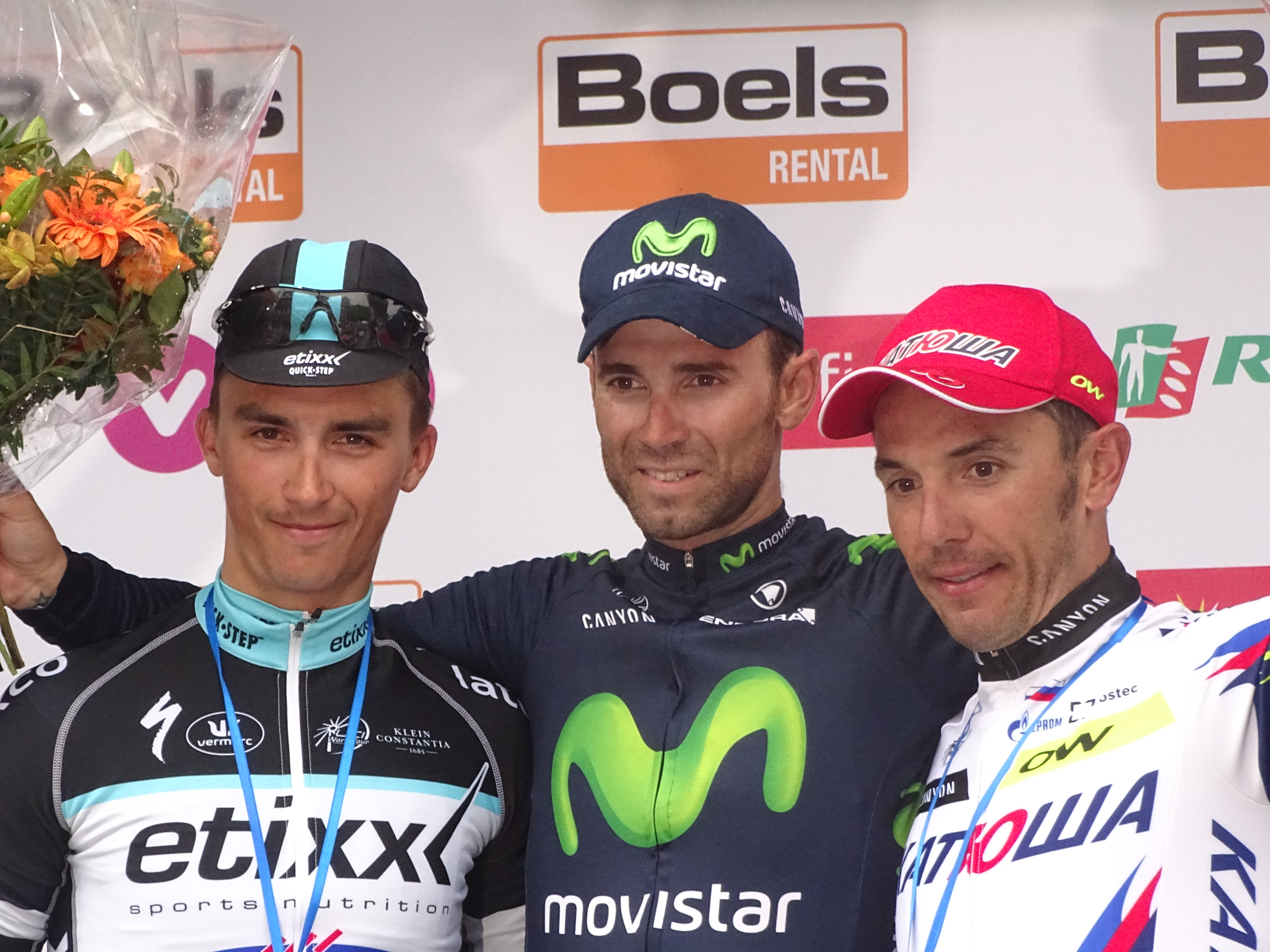
The riders on the podium (from left to right: Julian Alaphilippe, Alejandro Valverde and Joaquim Rodríguez)

Result (1–10)
Rank	Rider	Team	Time
1	Alejandro Valverde (ESP)	Movistar Team	6h 14' 20"
2	Julian Alaphilippe (FRA)	Etixx–Quick-Step	+ 0"
3	Joaquim Rodríguez (ESP)	Team Katusha	+ 0"
4	Rui Costa (POR)	Lampre–Merida	+ 0"
5	Roman Kreuziger (CZE)	Tinkoff–Saxo	+ 0"
6	Romain Bardet (FRA)	AG2R La Mondiale	+ 0"
7	Sergio Henao (COL)	Team Sky	+ 0"
8	Domenico Pozzovivo (ITA)	AG2R La Mondiale	+ 0"
9	Jakob Fuglsang (DEN)	Astana	+ 0"
10	Daniel Moreno (ESP)	Team Katusha	+ 0"

== Post-race analysis ==
=== Rider reactions ===
Valverde's win was his third victory at the race, and he became one of only six riders to have three or more victories in the race. Liège–Bastogne–Liège also concluded a very successful Ardennes week for him: he had two victories and one second-place finish in the three races. Valverde was the first rider since Philippe Gilbert in 2011 to win both La Flèche Wallonne and Liège–Bastogne–Liège in the same week and, although he was one place away from imitating Gilbert's Ardennes triple, he described it as a "great week".

Alaphilippe's second-place finish was the best for any French rider since Laurent Jalabert in 1998. He had entered the race in support of Kwiatkowski. When Kwiatkowski was struggling on the Côte de Saint-Nicolas, the Etixx-Quick Step directeur sportif sent a radio message to Alaphilippe to ride for himself; this was similar to the events in La Flèche Wallonne, where Alaphilippe also finished second to Valverde. He was frustrated on the finish line and waved his arm in the air; he said after the race "today I really felt I could have done something more". Cyclingnews.com suggested after the race that he had the potential to win a Monument in the future.

Several riders were injured in the crash 40 kilometres (25 miles) from the finish. The worst-affected was Yukiya Arashiro, who suffered several broken bones, while Gianluca Brambilla (Etixx–Quick-Step) broke his collarbone. LottoNL–Jumbo had two riders with injuries: Paul Martens broke his hand and Bram Tankink suffered from concussion and bruises. Nicolas Roche and Simon Gerrans both suffered some discomfort after their crashes, but neither had significant injuries. Dan Martin rode the Tour de Romandie the following week; after he suffered with his breathing through the race, he discovered that he had broken two ribs in the crash in Liège–Bastogne–Liège.

=== UCI World Tour rankings ===
After his strong Ardennes week, Valverde moved into the lead of the UCI World Tour individual rankings, with Richie Porte (Team Sky) dropping to second place. Rui Costa also moved into the top ten. Spain moved ahead of Australia in the nations' standings, while Etixx–Quick-Step retained their lead of the team rankings.

UCI World Tour individual rankings
Rank	Rider	Team	Points
1	Alejandro Valverde (ESP)	Movistar Team	338
2	Richie Porte (AUS)	Team Sky	303
3	Alexander Kristoff (NOR)	Team Katusha	237
4	John Degenkolb (GER)	Team Giant–Alpecin	232
5	Joaquim Rodríguez (ESP)	Team Katusha	230
6	Michał Kwiatkowski (POL)	Etixx–Quick-Step	195
7	Rui Costa (POR)	Lampre–Merida	194
8	Geraint Thomas (GBR)	Team Sky	184
9	Greg Van Avermaet (BEL)	BMC Racing Team	178
10	Nairo Quintana (COL)	Movistar Team	168
