= 2013 Giro di Lombardia =

Giro di Lombardia 2013
2013 UCI World Tour
- Event poster

Race details
- Dates: October 6, 2013
- Stages: 1
- Distance: 242 km (150.4 mi)
- Winning time: 6h 10' 18"

Results
| | Winner | Joaquim Rodríguez (ESP) | (Team Katusha) |
| | Second | Alejandro Valverde (ESP) | (Movistar Team) |
| | Third | Rafał Majka (POL) | (Saxo–Tinkoff) |

The 2013 Giro di Lombardia or 2013 Il Lombardia was the 107th edition of the Giro di Lombardia single-day cycling race, often known as the Race of the Falling Leaves. It was held on 6 October 2013. Joaquim Rodríguez (Team Katusha) won the race for a consecutive time after a solo breakaway initiated on the final climb of the day. Alejandro Valverde finished second before Rafał Majka.

== Results ==
| | Cyclist | Team | Time | UCI World Tour Points |
|---|---|---|---|---|
| 1 | Joaquim Rodríguez (ESP) | Team Katusha | 6h 10' 18" | 100 |
| 2 | Alejandro Valverde (ESP) | Movistar Team | +17" | 80 |
| 3 | Rafał Majka (POL) | Saxo–Tinkoff | +23" | 70 |
| 4 | Dan Martin (IRL) | Garmin–Sharp | +45" | 60 |
| 5 | Enrico Gasparotto (ITA) | Astana | +45" | 50 |
| 6 | Daniel Moreno (ESP) | Team Katusha | +55" | 40 |
| 7 | Pieter Serry (BEL) | Omega Pharma–Quick-Step | +55" | 30 |
| 8 | Franco Pellizotti (ITA) | Androni Giocattoli–Venezuela | +55" | - |
| 9 | Ivan Santaromita (ITA) | BMC Racing Team | +55" | 10 |
| 10 | Robert Gesink (NED) | Belkin Pro Cycling | +55" | 4 |
