= Joaquim Rodríguez =

Spanish road bicycle racer

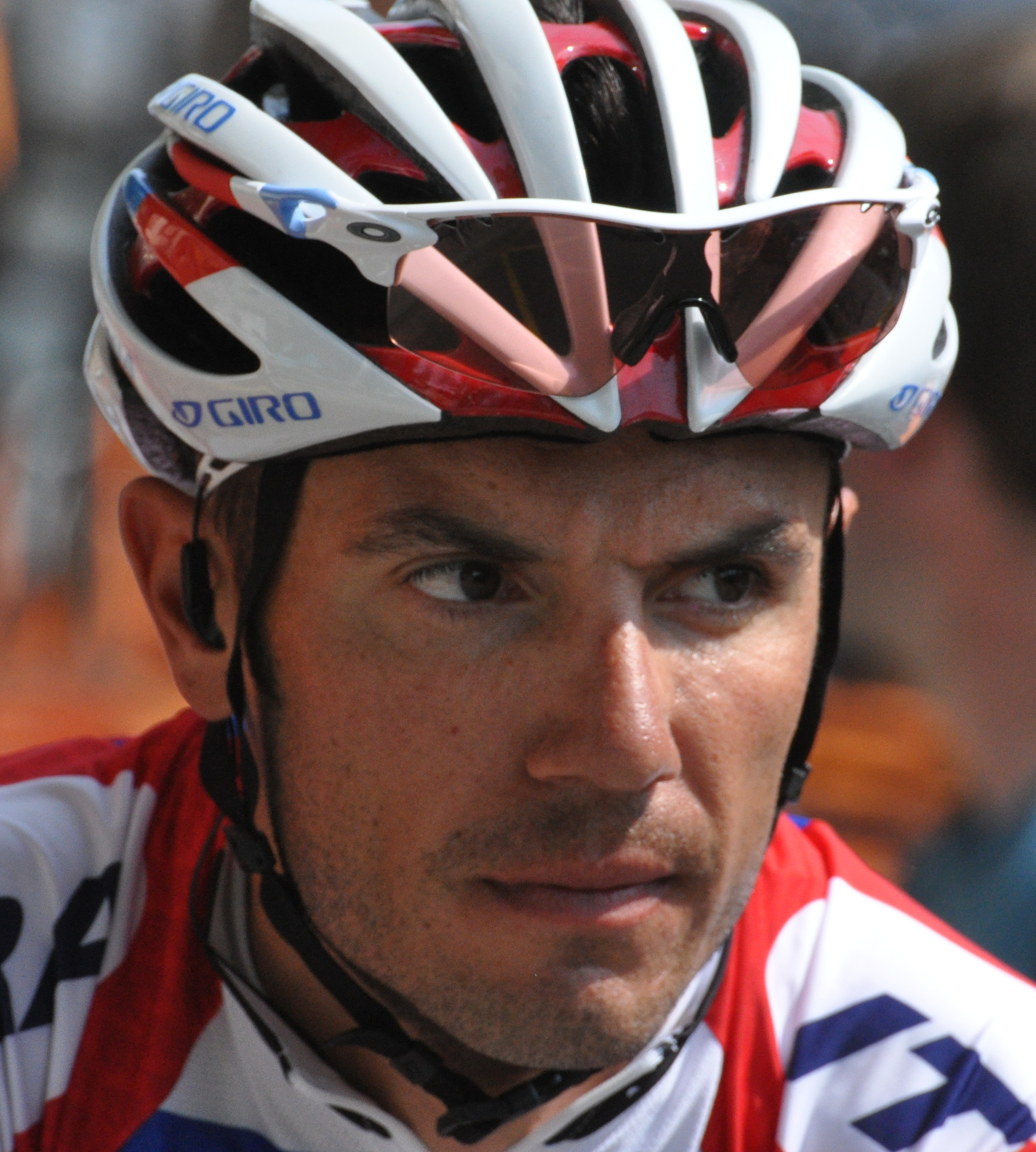
- Rodríguez at the 2013 Tour de France

Personal information
- Full name: Joaquim Rodríguez Oliver
- Nickname: El Purito
- Born: 12 May 1979 (age 47) Barcelona, Spain
- Height: 1.69 m (5 ft 6 1/2 in)
- Weight: 57 kg (126 lb; 9 st 0 lb)

Cycling career
- Sport: Cycling
- Disciplines: Road; Mountain biking
- Role: Rider; Team ambassador; Team owner
- Rider type: Climbing specialist Puncheur

Amateur teams
- 1998: Hospitalet–Vestisport
- 1999–2000: Iberdrola–Loina
- 2000: ONCE–Deutsche Bank (stagiaire)
- 2019: Andbank–La Purito
- 2020–2022: Orbea Factory Team

Professional teams
- 2001–2003: ONCE–Eroski
- 2004–2005: Saunier Duval–Prodir
- 2006–2009: Caisse d'Epargne–Illes Balears
- 2010–2016: Team Katusha

Managerial teams
- 2017–2018: Bahrain–Merida (team ambassador)
- 2019: Andbank–La Purito (team owner)

Major wins
- Grand Tours Tour de France 3 individual stages (2010, 2015) Giro d'Italia Points classification (2012) 2 individual stages (2012) Vuelta a España Mountains classification (2005) Combination classification (2015) 9 individual stages (2003, 2010, 2011, 2012, 2013, 2015) Stage races Volta a Catalunya (2010, 2014) Tour of the Basque Country (2015) Vuelta a Burgos (2011) Setmana Catalana de Ciclisme (2004) One-day races and Classics National Road Race Championships (2007) Giro di Lombardia (2012, 2013) La Flèche Wallonne (2012) Other UCI World Tour (2010, 2012, 2013)
Medal record
Representing Spain
Men's road bicycle racing
World Championships
| Silver medal – second place | 2013 Florence | Road race |
| Bronze medal – third place | 2009 Mendrisio | Road race |

Joaquim Rodríguez Oliver (born 12 May 1979) is a Spanish cyclist, who competed in road bicycle racing between 2001 and 2016 for the ONCE–Eroski, Saunier Duval–Prodir, Caisse d'Epargne and Team Katusha teams. Following his retirement from road racing, Rodríguez has competed in mountain bike racing and formed his own mountain bike racing team, Andbank–La Purito.

Rodríguez recorded notable results included fourteen Grand Tour stage victories, and five overall podium placings: second places at the 2012 Giro d'Italia and the 2015 Vuelta a España, and third-place finishes at the 2010 Vuelta a España, the 2012 Vuelta a España and the 2013 Tour de France. He also finished first in the UCI world rankings in 2010, 2012 and 2013, and won classics such as the La Flèche Wallonne and the Giro di Lombardia twice (2012 and 2013). He also won stage races including the Volta a Catalunya twice (2010 and 2014), the 2015 Tour of the Basque Country and the 2011 Vuelta a Burgos.

== Personal life and early career ==
Rodríguez was born in Barcelona, the son of an amateur rider in the 1960s, and later lived in Parets del Vallès. Some years later he moved to the Basque country to ride for Iberdrola, an amateur team associated with the professional cycling team ONCE–Eroski.

His nickname in the professional peloton is Purito, Spanish for little cigar, a name he was given in an early season training camp during his first year as a professional with ONCE–Eroski. When some of his teammates stepped up the pace on a small climb, he passed them making a hand gesture appearing to be smoking a cigar, suggesting he was climbing without much effort. The gesture was not welcomed by his teammates, who made him smoke a real cigar as a hazing ritual later in the evening.

== Professional career ==
=== ONCE (2000–2003) ===
In 2001 he turned professional with ONCE–Eroski after riding for the team in late 2000 as a stagiaire. In 2001, during his first season as a professional, he won the Escalada a Montjuïc, a race held in Barcelona. In 2003 he won the sixth stage of the Paris–Nice, while he also won team time trials with ONCE–Eroski at the Volta a Catalunya and Vuelta a España.

=== Saunier Duval–Prodir (2004–2005) ===
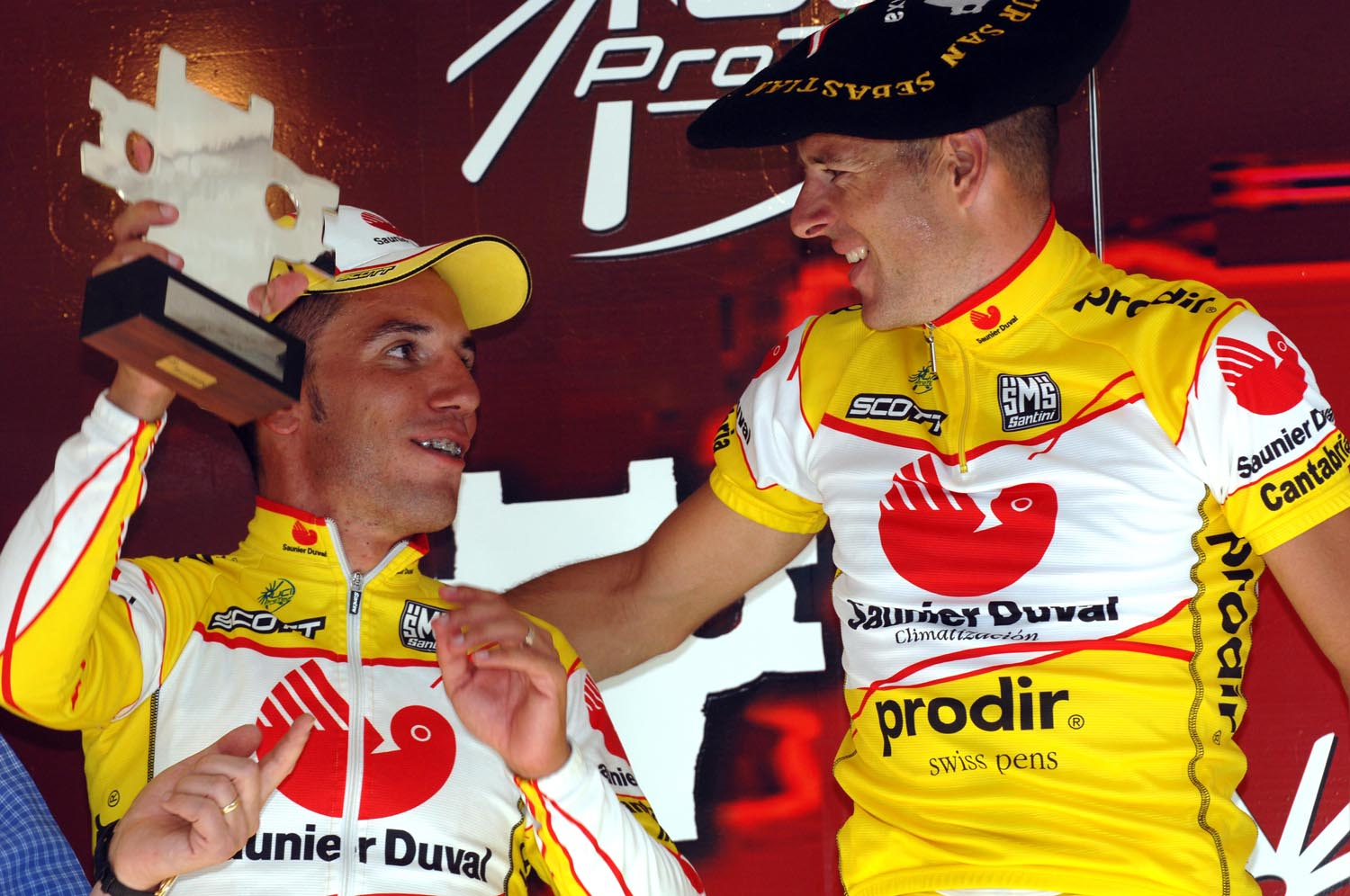
Rodriguez (left) at the 2005 Clásica de San Sebastián

In 2004 he joined Saunier Duval–Prodir and won the Setmana Catalana de Ciclisme, a stage race held in Catalonia. The following year he won Subida a Urkiola and the Mountains classification of the Vuelta a España, while he finished second in the Clásica de San Sebastián and the Vuelta a Burgos.

=== Caisse d'Epargne (2006–2009) ===
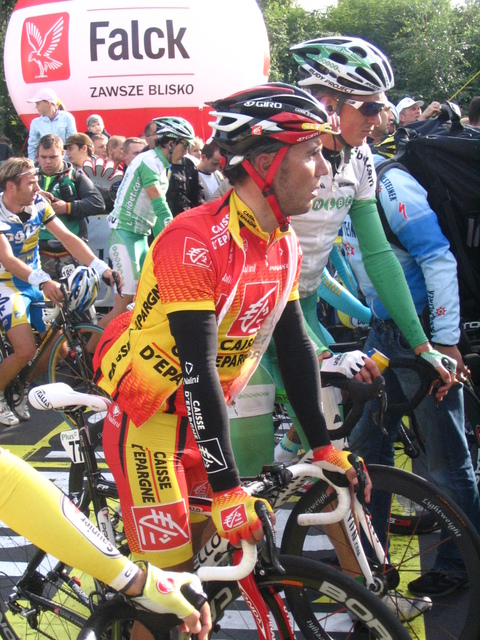
Rodríguez at the 2007 Tour de Pologne

After joining Caisse d'Epargne–Illes Balears in 2006, he won the fifth stage of Paris–Nice. In 2007 he won the Spanish National Road Race Championships and also won the Klasika Primavera and Prueba Villafranca de Ordizia. In 2008 he won a stage to Montelupone at the third stage of Tirreno–Adriatico atop a 1.7-kilometre (1.1 mi) climb with sections over 20% in gradients which had many cyclists coming in after him get off and run while carrying their bikes or zig-zag up the climb since it was so steep, but he was one of the few who powered up the difficulty while riding a straight line. He also finished eighth at the Amstel Gold Race, La Flèche Wallonne and Liège–Bastogne–Liège. Later in the season he finished sixth in the Vuelta a España. In 2009 he repeated his stage victory at Montelupone, in Tirreno–Adriatico, while he ended second in Liège–Bastogne–Liège. The second half of the season was marked by a stage win at the Vuelta a Burgos, a seventh place in the overall classification of the Vuelta a España and a bronze medal in the World Road Race Championships in Mendrisio, Switzerland.

=== Katusha (2010–2016) ===
==== 2010 ====
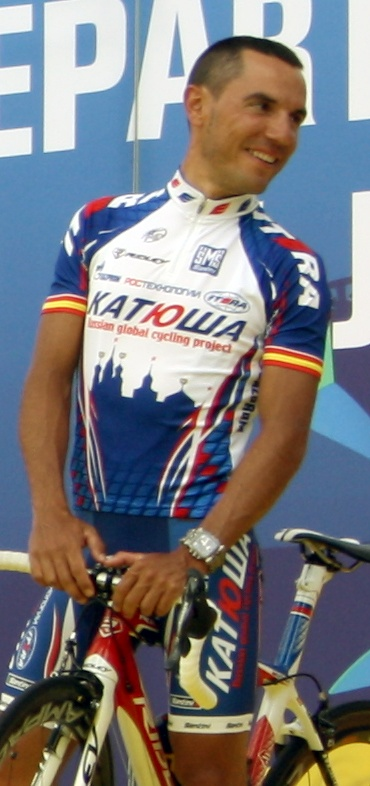
Rodriguez at the 2010 Tour de France

In 2010 he joined the Russian Team Katusha, which guaranteed him a position at the Tour de France and a leading role in certain races throughout the season. Early in the season Rodríguez won the Volta a Catalunya, the UCI ProTour race held around Catalonia, and later won the GP Miguel Induráin and a stage at the Tour of the Basque Country, where he eventually finished third. He also ended second behind Cadel Evans in La Flèche Wallonne. At the Tour de France he won the stage to Mende, which featured an uphill finish to the Côte de la Croix Neuve, with the finish line at the runway of the Mende Aerodrome. Rodríguez finished eighth at the Tour de France. He continued his strong performance during the season with a fifth place at the Clásica de San Sebastián and a fourth place in the overall classification at the Vuelta a España, winning the stage to Peña Cabarga. He was the leader in the race until the final 48 km time-trial in stage 17 in Peñafiel when he lost it to Nibali. Rodríguez topped the UCI World Ranking at the end of the season.

==== 2011 ====
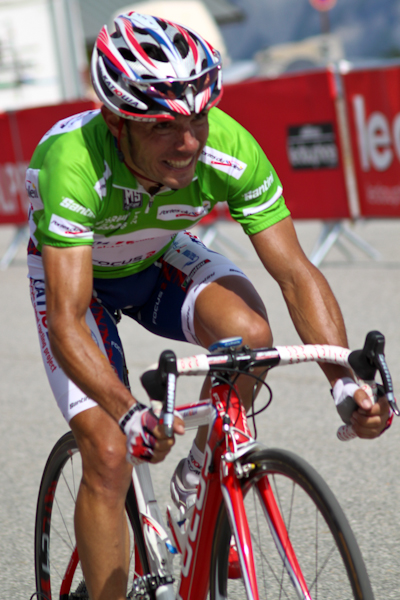
Rodríguez at the 2011 Critérium du Dauphiné

In 2011 he won a stage at the Tour of the Basque Country and finished second behind Philippe Gilbert at both the Amstel Gold Race and La Flèche Wallonne. He later finished fifth at the Giro d'Italia and won the stages to Le Collet d'Allevard and La Toussuire in the Critérium du Dauphiné, where he won the points and mountains classifications and finished fifth overall. He skipped the Tour de France to concentrate on the races at the end of the season, mainly the Vuelta a España, where he was considered a possible candidate for winning the race. He started the second half of the season by finishing fourth at the Clásica de San Sebastián and winning the overall classification and a stage at the Vuelta a Burgos. He started the Vuelta a España with stage victories at Valdepeñas de Jaén and San Lorenzo de El Escorial, where he captured the leader's jersey, but soon faded and eventually finished the race nineteenth overall. He ended the season with a third place at the Giro di Lombardia.

==== 2012 ====
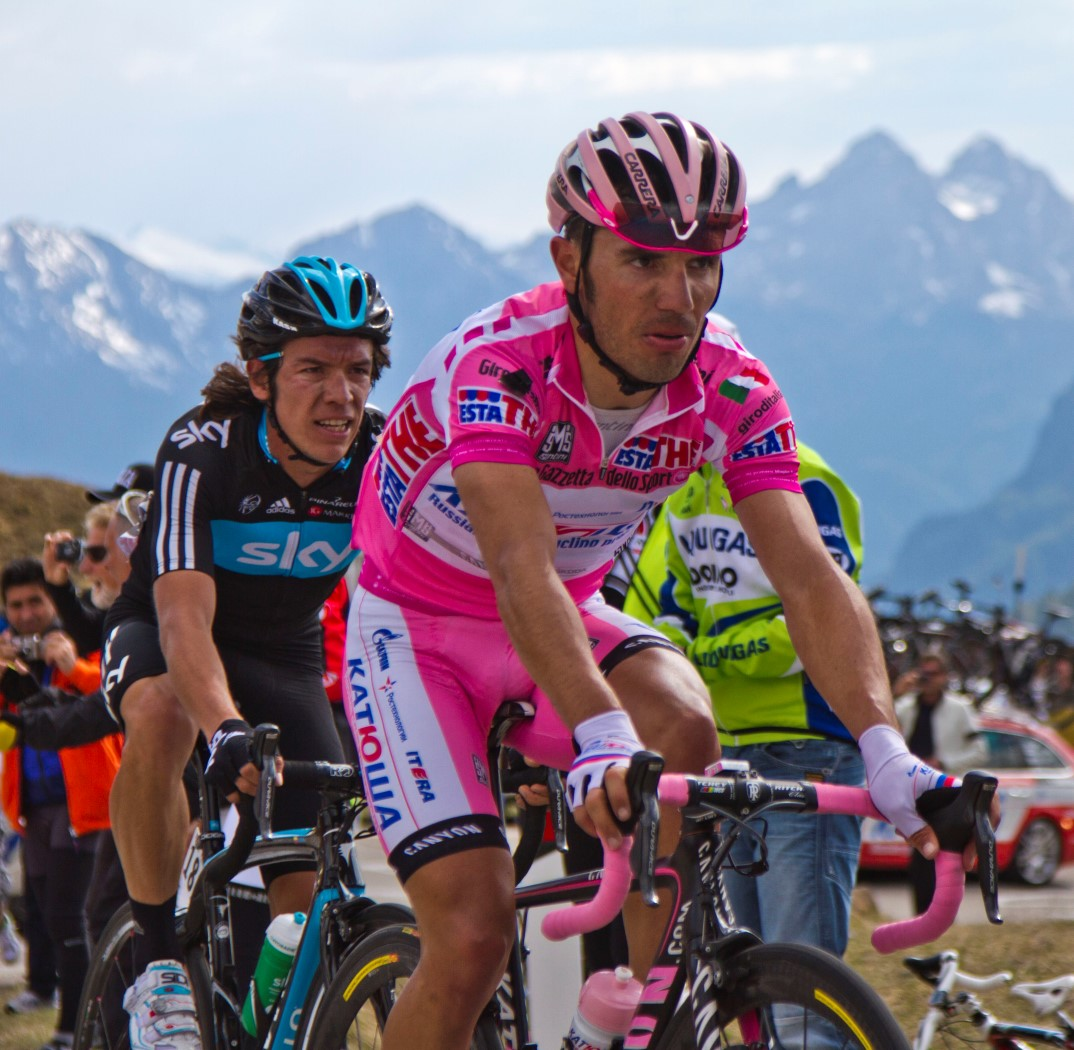
Rodríguez (right), wearing the maglia rosa of the general classification leader, at the 2012 Giro d'Italia

On 18 April 2012, he won La Flèche Wallonne in Belgium with a superb climb on the Mur de Huy and finished second in the Tour of the Basque Country. Rodríguez took his good form into the Giro d'Italia where he won two stages and finished second overall to Canadian Ryder Hesjedal. He was always competitive with the general classification contenders in the high mountains, and held the maglia rosa coming into the final individual time trial, where he lost 47 seconds to Hesjedal, therefore losing the overall lead by 16 seconds. However, he won the points classification jersey, with a slim lead of one point (139 to 138) over Mark Cavendish.

On the Vuelta a España, Rodríguez almost took the win on stage 3, but Alejandro Valverde popped up on his right to steal the victory in a photo finish, and snatched the red jersey. On the next stage, a big crash occurred involving Valverde. Rodríguez took the lead in the overall classification, arriving with the remnants of the bunch atop the climb of the Orduña. He took the sixth stage, the majority of it was flat but the riders had to tackle with two Category 3 climbs near the conclusion, the line being situated atop the last one, the Fuerte del Rapitán in Jaca. With 500 m (1,600 ft) remaining, Chris Froome launched an attack which only Rodríguez could follow, before passing the Team Sky rider and grabbing both the victory and the twelve-second time bonus. The scenario repeated itself on stage 12, where Rodríguez escaped from the lead group with Alberto Contador on the final difficulty of the day, the very steep climb Mirador de Ézaro. The pair broke away in a section that had a gradient approaching 20%, and Rodríguez soon powered away from Contador to take his second stage of the Vuelta with an eight-second margin over Contador. On the mountainous stage 14, Rodríguez played the same trick on Contador again on the final climb, with Contador attacking with two kilometers to go and looking very likely to take the victory. Rodríguez got back to him, his rival attacked again and Rodríguez surged ahead to take the win. Disaster struck for him on stage 17, where Contador slipped into a breakaway and went on to win the stage solo, as Rodríguez could not respond and was relegated to third place overall. Despite his attacks on the penultimate stage in the steep climb of Bola del Mondo, Rodríguez could not improve his third placing although he gained some time on Contador.

Rodríguez went to Italy to compete in the Giro di Lombardia, where he had the opportunity to take the first place in the 2012 UCI World Tour detained by Bradley Wiggins. He did exactly that by winning the race under heavy rain and temperatures oscillating around 10 °C (50 °F). He attacked on the final difficulty of the day, the Villa Vergano climb. He arrived at the top of the difficulty alone and descended to Lecco, claiming the victory with a gap of 9 seconds.

==== 2013 ====
In 2013, Rodríguez started his season winning stage 4 in the Tour of Oman, where he ended up finishing fourth overall. He later won stage five of Tirreno–Adriatico and went on to finish fifth overall, after following an attack from Peter Sagan and Vincenzo Nibali on stage 6 and gaining time on his rivals. Rodríguez rode the Volta a Catalunya and Liège–Bastogne–Liège, where at both races he finished second behind Dan Martin. Rodríguez later aimed for a high finish in the Tour de France.

In the Tour, Rodríguez had a quiet start and after the first time trial on stage 11, Rodríguez was eleventh overall, over five minutes behind the race leader. Rodríguez picked up his form on stage 15 in which he finished fourth on Mont Ventoux, moving him into the top ten. He later finished third on the uphill time trial stage. On stage 18, he moved into the top five after finishing fifth on Alpe d'Huez, gaining a minute on race leader Chris Froome. On the mountainous stage 20 to Annecy–Semnoz, he finished second behind Nairo Quintana. However, Rodríguez managed to move into a podium position in the final general classification after gaining over a minute over Alberto Contador and Roman Kreuziger.

After the Tour de France, he took a long break and then came as the leader of Team Katusha at the start of the Vuelta a España, a race he twice finished on the podium in the past. One of the favorites at the start of the race, Rodríguez won the 19th stage and finished fourth in the overall classification, more than three minutes behind winner Chris Horner. Afterwards, he raced the World Championships, where he came short of winning the rainbow jersey, after being caught by eventual winner Rui Costa in the last kilometer. One week later, Rodríguez took revenge for his defeat at the Giro di Lombardia, winning for the second consecutive year with a perfectly timed attack on the Villa Vergano climb.

==== 2014 ====
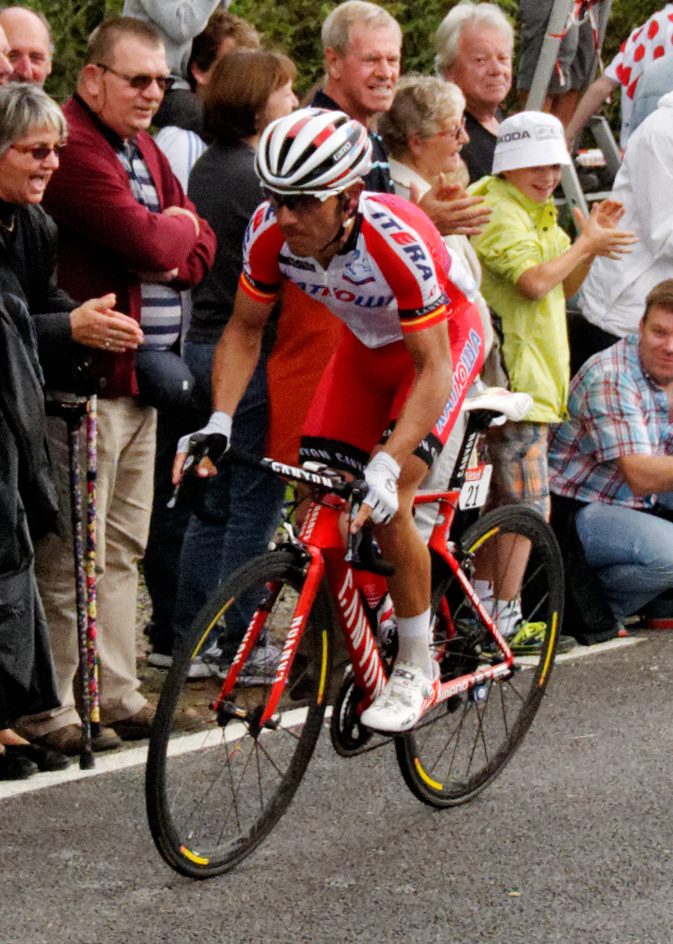
Rodriguez at the 2014 Tour de France

Rodríguez's first race of the season was the Tour de San Luis, where he finished 71st, without making an impact in the mountains. After this, Rodríguez went to the Dubai Tour and the Tour of Oman, where he eventually finished fourth, behind Chris Froome, Tejay van Garderen, and Rigoberto Urán. For the first time in four years, Rodríguez skipped Tirreno–Adriatico, choosing instead to prepare for the Ardennes Classics on the Teide on Tenerife. He then came back to racing in the Volta a Catalunya, where he won the third stage and the general classification, for the second time in his career. Rodríguez was forced to quit the Giro d'Italia after a serious crash in stage six where he suffered a broken rib and fractured thumb. He finished the Vuelta a España just off the podium, in fourth place overall.

==== 2015 ====
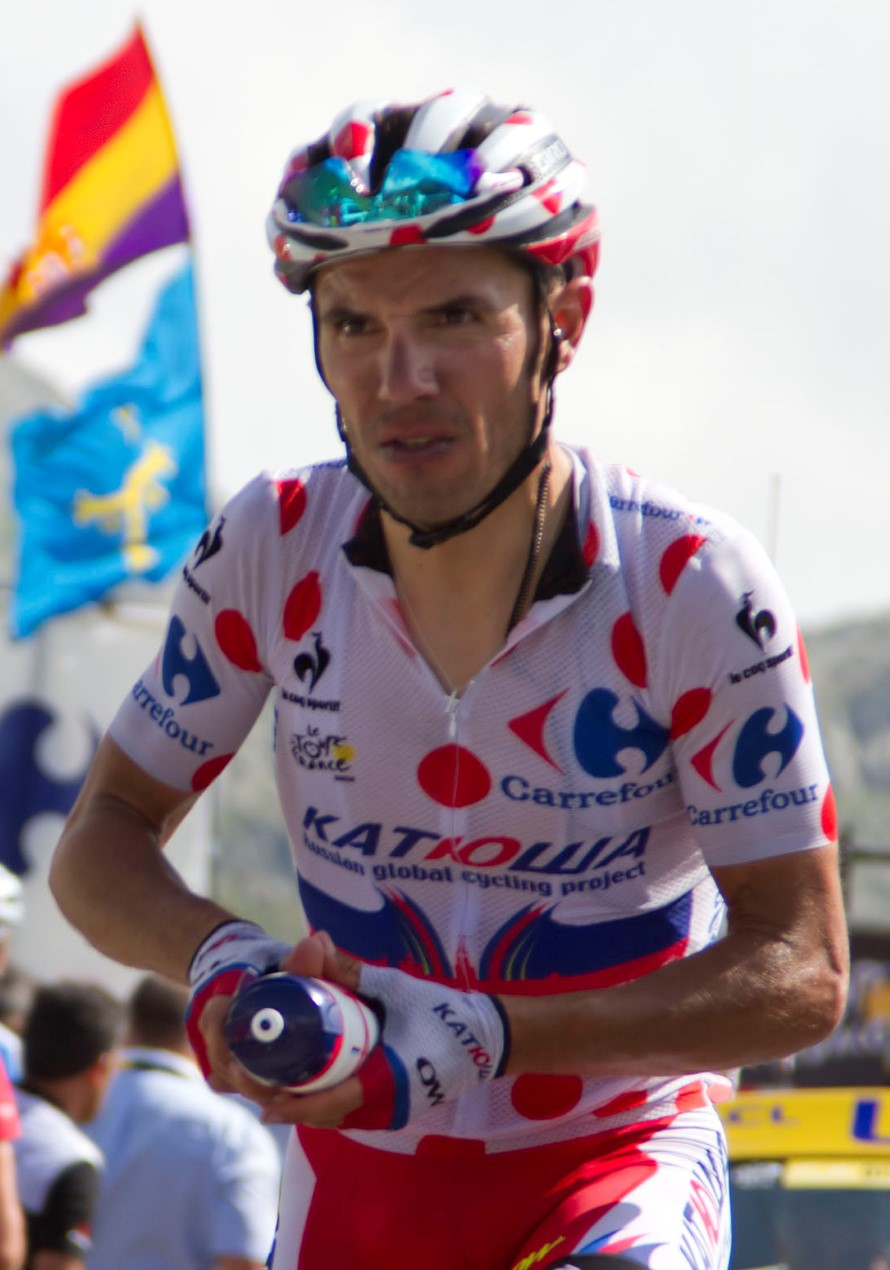
Rodriguez at the 2015 Tour de France

Rodríguez started his season somewhat late and quietly by taking thirteenth place overall in Tirreno–Adriatico. He mounted on the third step of the podium twice in stages of that race. He had his first win of the season on a mountainous third stage of the Tour of the Basque Country, outsprinting Nairo Quintana and Sergio Henao after a descent in Zumarraga. He repeated his winning ways on the very next day, on the queen stage, winning the sprint after the final climb. In the final time trial, Rodríguez finished second overall to overtake race leader Henao by 13 seconds to win the race overall. In the Ardennes Classics, Rodríguez finished fourth at La Flèche Wallonne. He then took a podium spot at Liège–Bastogne–Liège as he was outsprinted by Alejandro Valverde and Julian Alaphilippe. In the Tour de France, Rodríguez won the third stage finishing atop the Mur de Huy. Rodríguez also won the twelfth stage atop the Plateau de Beille, his first Tour de France win on a mountain stage.

==== 2016 ====
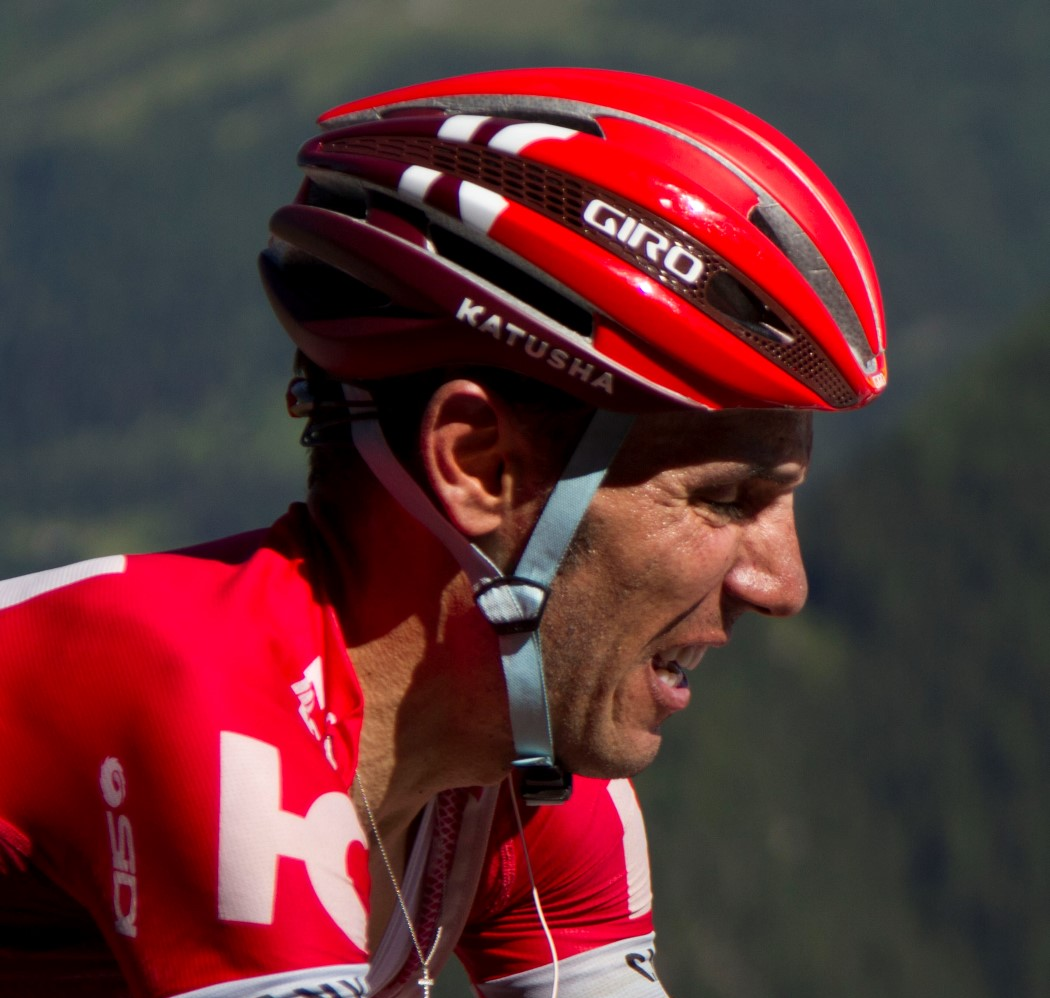
Rodríguez at the 2016 Tour de France

Rodríguez struggled in the early part of the season, partly due to illness, however he recovered somewhat with a fifth place in the Tour of the Basque Country. His stated aim for the Tour de France was to achieve a top ten finish in the general classification, and his bid started strongly, holding third place overall after the first stage in the Pyrenees. On the first rest day of the Tour, Rodríguez announced that he would retire from competition at the end of the season, confirming that he was hoping to compete in the Rio Olympics and the Vuelta a España before the end of the year. Subsequently, his performances dipped somewhat in the second week of the race, dropping him down to 12th in the general classification following a couple of bad days. However he rallied in the final week, going on the attack on the final mountain stage to Morzine in treacherous weather to move up to his final overall position of seventh. On the final stage, Rodríguez was granted the honour of leading the peloton onto the Champs-Élysées to mark his final appearance in the race.

After the Tour, he headed to the Clásica de San Sebastián, where he finished fourth and was awarded the prize for most aggressive rider. After the race he told the media that the Clásica was his final competition in Spain, ruling out participation in the Vuelta a España, whilst Katusha directeur sportif Xavier Florencio described Rodríguez's ride in San Sebastián as being his last for the team. Rodríguez finished fifth in the Olympic road race in his first Olympic appearance. After the race he confirmed that he would retire immediately, rather than continuing to the end of the year. However, in September it was reported that Katusha would enter Rodríguez into the Trittico di Autunno classics and the Abu Dhabi Tour before the end of the year, with his contract with the team not expiring until 31 December. He failed to finish in all three Trittico di Autunno races, his final race being the Il Lombardia.

=== Bahrain–Merida ===
In October 2016, it was announced that Rodríguez would join Bahrain–Merida for the 2017 season, initially as one of the team's riders before joining the squad's backroom staff from 2018 onwards. However, Rodríguez announced his retirement once again, in December 2016. He joined the squad's backroom staff, becoming an ambassador for the team.

== Major results ==
2001 (2 pro wins)
1st Overall Escalada a Montjuïc

1st Stage 1a

3rd Subida a Urkiola
8th Clásica a los Puertos de Guadarrama
2002
6th Klasika Primavera
2003 (2)
Vuelta a España

1st Stages 1 (TTT) & 8
Held after Stages 2–3
Held after Stages 2–3 & 8

1st Stage 6 Paris–Nice
1st Stage 1 (TTT) Volta a Catalunya
3rd Overall Escalada a Montjuïc
8th Overall Setmana Catalana de Ciclisme
9th Gran Premio Bruno Beghelli
10th Trofeo Calvià
2004 (1)
1st Overall Setmana Catalana de Ciclisme
3rd Overall Escalada a Montjuïc
6th Overall Vuelta a Andalucía
10th Overall Tirreno–Adriatico
2005 (1)
1st Mountains classification, Vuelta a España
1st Subida a Urkiola
2nd Overall Vuelta a Burgos
2nd Clásica de San Sebastián
3rd Overall Escalada a Montjuïc
4th Klasika Primavera
10th GP Miguel Induráin
2006 (2)
1st Stage 5 Paris–Nice
3rd Overall Escalada a Montjuïc

1st Stage 1a

3rd Klasika Primavera
2007 (3)
1st Road race, National Road Championships
1st Klasika Primavera
1st Prueba Villafranca de Ordizia
2nd GP Miguel Induráin
5th Overall Tour du Limousin
8th Subida a Urkiola
9th Overall Tour of the Basque Country
10th Overall Paris–Nice
2008 (1)
1st Stage 3 Tirreno–Adriatico
3rd GP Miguel Induráin
5th Subida a Urkiola
6th Road race, UCI Road World Championships
6th Overall Vuelta a España
8th Amstel Gold Race
8th La Flèche Wallonne
8th Liège–Bastogne–Liège
2009 (2)
1st Stage 4 Tirreno–Adriatico
1st Stage 2 Vuelta a Burgos
2nd Liège–Bastogne–Liège
2nd Prueba Villafranca de Ordizia
3rd Road race, UCI Road World Championships
6th Japan Cup
7th Overall Vuelta a España
2010 (5)
1st UCI World Ranking
1st Overall Volta a Catalunya
1st GP Miguel Induráin
2nd La Flèche Wallonne
3rd Overall Tour of the Basque Country

1st Stage 5

3rd Overall Vuelta a España

1st Stage 14
Held after Stages 10 & 16
Held after Stages 14–19

5th Clásica de San Sebastián
6th Overall Tour de France

1st Stage 12

6th Overall Paris–Nice
9th Overall Tour de Suisse
2011 (7)
1st Overall Vuelta a Burgos

1st Points classification
1st Stage 2

Vuelta a España

1st Stages 5 & 8
Held after Stages 8
Held after Stages 6, 8–16 & 18–20

1st Stage 1 Tour of the Basque Country
2nd Amstel Gold Race
2nd La Flèche Wallonne
3rd UCI World Tour
3rd Clásica de San Sebastián
3rd Circuito de Getxo
3rd Giro di Lombardia
4th Overall Giro d'Italia
5th Overall Critérium du Dauphiné

1st Points classification
1st Mountains classification
1st Stages 6 & 7

6th Prueba Villafranca de Ordizia
6th Giro dell'Emilia
9th GP Miguel Induráin
2012 (10)
1st UCI World Tour
1st Giro di Lombardia
1st La Flèche Wallonne
2nd Overall Giro d'Italia

1st Points classification
1st Stages 10 & 17
Held after Stages 10–13 & 15–20

2nd Overall Tour of the Basque Country

1st Stages 4 & 5

3rd Overall Vuelta a España

1st Stages 6, 12 & 14
Held after Stages 4–16
Held after Stages 9 & 12–20
Held after Stages 4–20

4th Milano–Torino
6th Overall Tirreno–Adriatico

1st Stage 6

7th Overall Tour of Oman
8th Clásica de San Sebastián
2013 (4)
1st UCI World Tour
1st Giro di Lombardia
2nd Road race, UCI Road World Championships
2nd Overall Volta a Catalunya
2nd Liège–Bastogne–Liège
3rd Overall Tour de France
4th Overall Vuelta a España

1st Stage 19

4th Overall Tour of Oman

1st Stage 4

5th Overall Tirreno–Adriatico

1st Stage 5

6th La Flèche Wallonne
2014 (2)
1st Overall Volta a Catalunya

1st Stage 3

3rd Clásica de San Sebastián
4th Overall Tour of Oman
4th Overall Vuelta a España
5th Milano–Torino
8th Giro di Lombardia
Tour de France

Held after Stages 10–12, 14–15

2015 (6)
1st Overall Tour of the Basque Country

1st Points classification
1st Stages 3 & 4

Tour de France

1st Stages 3 & 12
Held after Stages 3–5, 18

2nd UCI World Tour
2nd Overall Vuelta a España

1st Combination classification
1st Stage 15
Held after Stage 16
Held after Stages 15–20

3rd Liège–Bastogne–Liège
4th La Flèche Wallonne
5th Clásica de San Sebastián
8th Overall Critérium du Dauphiné
2016
4th Clásica de San Sebastián
5th Road race, Olympic Games
5th Overall Tour of the Basque Country
7th Overall Tour de France
8th Liège–Bastogne–Liège
2019
1st Overall Masters Cape Epic (with José Antonio Hermida)

=== General classification results timeline ===
Grand Tour general classification results
| Grand Tour | 2001 | 2002 | 2003 | 2004 | 2005 | 2006 | 2007 | 2008 | 2009 | 2010 | 2011 | 2012 | 2013 | 2014 | 2015 | 2016 |
| Giro d'Italia | 80 | — | — | — | 80 | — | — | 17 | DNF | — | 4 | 2 | — | DNF | — | — |
| Tour de France | — | — | — | — | — | — | — | — | — | 6 | — | — | 3 | 54 | 29 | 7 |
| / Vuelta a España | — | — | 26 | 42 | 37 | 17 | — | 6 | 7 | 3 | 19 | 3 | 4 | 4 | 2 | — |
Major stage race general classification results
| Major stage race | 2001 | 2002 | 2003 | 2004 | 2005 | 2006 | 2007 | 2008 | 2009 | 2010 | 2011 | 2012 | 2013 | 2014 | 2015 | 2016 |
| / Paris–Nice | 33 | 22 | 22 | — | 30 | 42 | 10 | — | — | 6 | — | — | — | — | — | — |
| / Tirreno–Adriatico | — | — | — | 10 | — | — | — | 34 | 15 | — | 67 | 6 | 5 | — | 13 | 80 |
| Volta a Catalunya | — | DNF | 46 | 51 | — | 14 | — | — | — | 1 | — | — | 2 | 1 | — | 11 |
| Tour of the Basque Country | — | 62 | DNF | — | 12 | DNF | 9 | 27 | DNF | 3 | 11 | 2 | — | — | 1 | 5 |
| / Tour de Romandie | — | — | — | DNF | — | 13 | 15 | — | — | — | — | — | — | — | — | — |
| Critérium du Dauphiné | — | — | — | — | — | — | — | — | — | — | 5 | — | 16 | — | 8 | DNF |
| Tour de Suisse | — | — | — | — | — | — | 17 | — | — | 9 | — | — | — | — | — | — |

=== Classics results timeline ===
| Monument | 2001 | 2002 | 2003 | 2004 | 2005 | 2006 | 2007 | 2008 | 2009 | 2010 | 2011 | 2012 | 2013 | 2014 | 2015 | 2016 |
|---|---|---|---|---|---|---|---|---|---|---|---|---|---|---|---|---|
| Milan–San Remo | — | — | — | 111 | — | — | — | 58 | 132 | — | — | — | — | — | — | — |
| Tour of Flanders | Did not contest during his career | | | | | | | | | | | | | | | |
| Paris–Roubaix | Did not contest during his career | | | | | | | | | | | | | | | |
| Liège–Bastogne–Liège | — | DNF | — | 70 | 24 | 12 | 75 | 8 | 2 | 41 | 26 | 15 | 2 | DNF | 3 | 8 |
| Giro di Lombardia | — | — | 32 | 20 | — | DNF | DSQ | 28 | DNF | DNF | 3 | 1 | 1 | 8 | — | DNF |
| Classic | 2001 | 2002 | 2003 | 2004 | 2005 | 2006 | 2007 | 2008 | 2009 | 2010 | 2011 | 2012 | 2013 | 2014 | 2015 | 2016 |
| Amstel Gold Race | — | — | DNF | — | 29 | 96 | 11 | 8 | 42 | DNF | 2 | 24 | DNF | DNF | 32 | DNF |
| La Flèche Wallonne | — | — | — | 72 | 23 | 33 | 76 | 8 | 29 | 2 | 2 | 1 | 6 | 70 | 4 | 28 |
| Clásica de San Sebastián | 54 | — | — | 30 | 2 | — | 54 | 12 | 33 | 5 | 3 | 8 | — | 3 | 5 | 4 |
| Milano–Torino | — | — | 23 | 33 | — | — | — | Not held | | | | 4 | 17 | 5 | — | DNF |

=== Major championships results timeline ===
| Event | | 2004 | 2005 | 2006 | 2007 | 2008 | 2009 | 2010 | 2011 | 2012 | 2013 | 2014 | 2015 | 2016 |
|---|---|---|---|---|---|---|---|---|---|---|---|---|---|---|
| Olympic Games | Road race | — | Not held | | | — | Not held | | | — | Not held | | | 5 |
| World Championships | Road race | — | — | 72 | 64 | 6 | 3 | — | — | 39 | 2 | 33 | DNF | — |
| National Championships | Road race | 7 | 7 | — | 1 | — | — | — | — | — | — | — | — | 37 |

Legend
| — | Did not compete |
| DNF | Did not finish |
