= Puncheur =

Road bicycle racer

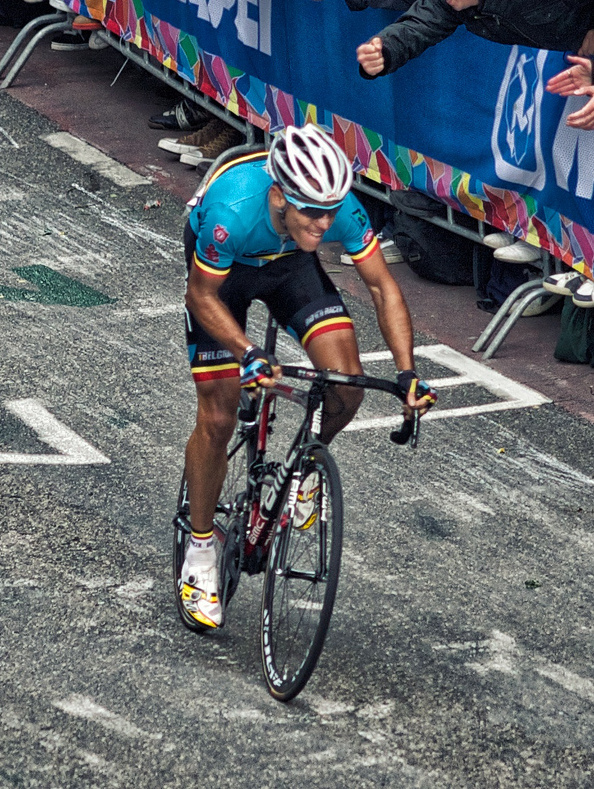
Philippe Gilbert sprinting to victory in the road race at the 2012 UCI Road World Championships

A puncheur or puncher is a road bicycle racer who specialises in rolling terrain with short but steep climbs.

The ideal races for this type of rider are one-day spring classics, which are characterized by multiple hills with a 10–20% gradient and 1–2 km in length. Examples include climbs at Liège–Bastogne–Liège, the Mur de Huy in the Flèche Wallonne and the Cauberg in the Amstel Gold Race, which comprise the Ardennes classics.

Puncheurs can be well built, with broader shoulders and bigger legs than the average racing cyclist (able to produce high overall power over short time periods) - for example Wout van Aert (78kg) or Peter Sagan (78kg) or smaller, lighter riders (able to produce a higher power/weight ratio over that same time period) - for example Paolo Bettini (58kg) or Julian Alaphilippe (62kg). The physique of this type of rider allows them to escape from the peloton through quick bursts, sometimes with the assistance of a teammate.

Examples of such racers include Paolo Bettini, Philippe Gilbert, Julian Alaphilippe, Alejandro Valverde, Simon Gerrans, Joaquim Rodríguez, Peter Sagan, Wout van Aert and Mathieu van der Poel, who are able to sprint up the shorter climbs to win a stage or a single-day race. Often these racers have had a career in mountainbike or cyclocross racing, where there are many shorter but steep climbs. However, their lower endurance is a disadvantage in stage races where the climbs are usually longer (5–20 km), albeit at lower gradients (5–10%). In stage races they often work as domestiques for team leaders, reeling in breakaways, or go on the attack to force rival teams to expend energy to chase them down.
