= Fränk Schleck =

Luxembourgish cyclist

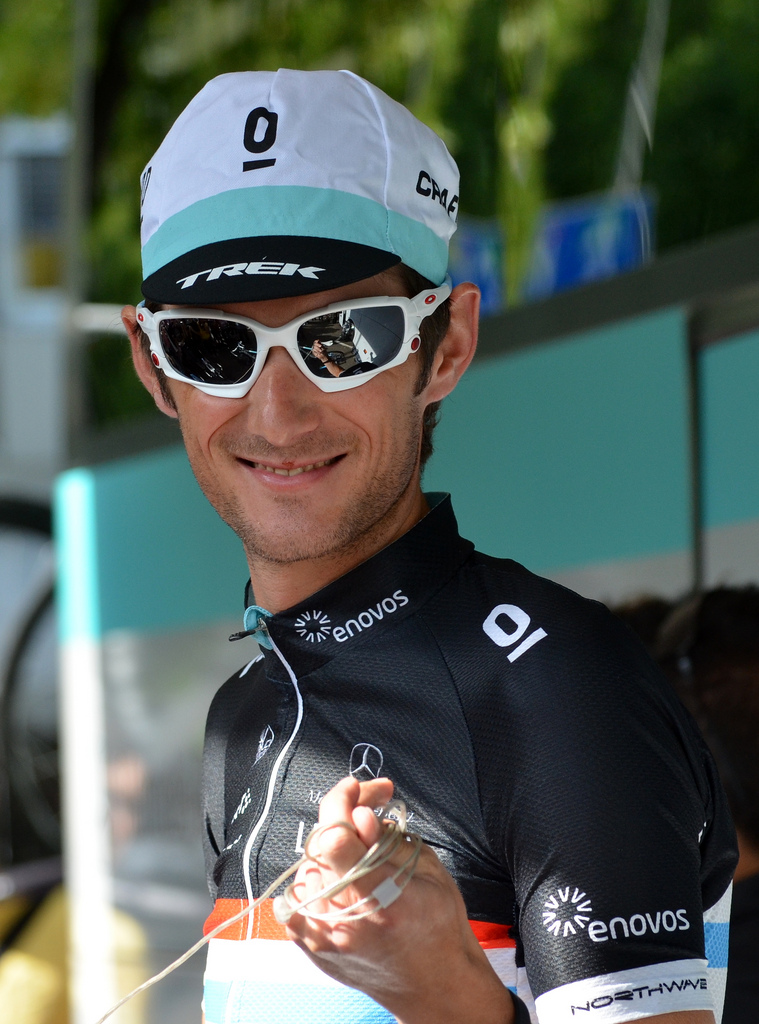
- Schleck at the 2011 Tour de Suisse

Personal information
- Full name: Fränk René Schleck
- Born: 15 April 1980 (age 46) Luxembourg City, Luxembourg
- Height: 1.86 m (6 ft 1 in)
- Weight: 65 kg (143 lb; 10 st 3 lb)

Cycling career
- Sport: Cycling
- Current team: Retired
- Discipline: Road
- Role: Rider
- Rider type: Climber; Puncheur

Amateur teams
- 1999: ACC Contern
- 2000: De Nardi
- 2001: Festina (stagiaire)
- 2002: Châteauroux
- 2002: CSC–Tiscali (stagiaire)

Professional teams
- 2003–2010: Team CSC
- 2011–2016: Leopard Trek

Major wins
- Grand Tours Tour de France 2 individual stages (2006, 2009) Vuelta a España 1 individual stage (2015) Stage races Tour de Luxembourg (2009) Tour de Suisse (2010) Critérium International (2011) One-day races and Classics National Road Race Championships (2005, 2008, 2010, 2011, 2014) Amstel Gold Race (2006) Giro dell'Emilia (2007)

Fränk René Schleck (born 15 April 1980) is a Luxembourgish former professional road bicycle racer, who rode professionally between 2003 and 2016, for Team Saxo Bank and Trek–Segafredo. Schleck is the older brother of Andy, winner of the 2010 Tour de France. Their father, Johny Schleck, was a professional road bicycle racer between 1965 and 1974, as was their grandfather, Gustave Schleck, who contested events in the 1930s.

Schleck's greatest achievements include five national road race championships, winning the Queen stage of the 2006 Tour de France, which finished on the Alpe d'Huez, the 2006 edition of the Amstel Gold Race classic, and an alpine stage of the 2009 Tour de France, finishing in the sole company of his brother Andy and Alberto Contador. On 30 January 2013, Schleck was suspended for 12 months following a positive test for xipamide at the 2012 Tour de France. The ban, backdated to the date of the positive test, expired on 13 July 2013.

== Career ==
After riding for the Luxembourg military sports programme, he moved to Italy to ride for De Nardi–Pasta Montegrappa. In 2001, he tried out as a stagiaire for Festina, but when the team folded after the season, Schleck was left with no contract. He contacted Team CSC manager Bjarne Riis through their common youth coach Marcel Gilles of the ACC Contern amateur team. Schleck rode 2002 as a stagiaire on Team CSC and signed to a pro contract by Riis in 2003.

=== 2005 ===
At the start of 2005, Schleck was joined by his younger brother Andy on Team CSC, and they split the 2005 national championships between them, with Fränk winning the road race and Andy winning the time trial. Schleck's breakthrough came in 2005, with three podium places in the last month of the season. He finished all three races behind Paolo Bettini (2004 Olympic Road Race winner) and Gilberto Simoni (two times Giro d'Italia winner), losing Züri-Metzgete to Bettini, the Giro dell'Emilia to Simoni, and finishing third behind both in the Giro di Lombardia. Schleck ended 2005 ranked 13th on the 2005 ProTour riders list. He extended his contract with Riis and Team CSC until 2008, one of three riders in the team with a three-year contract.

=== 2006 ===
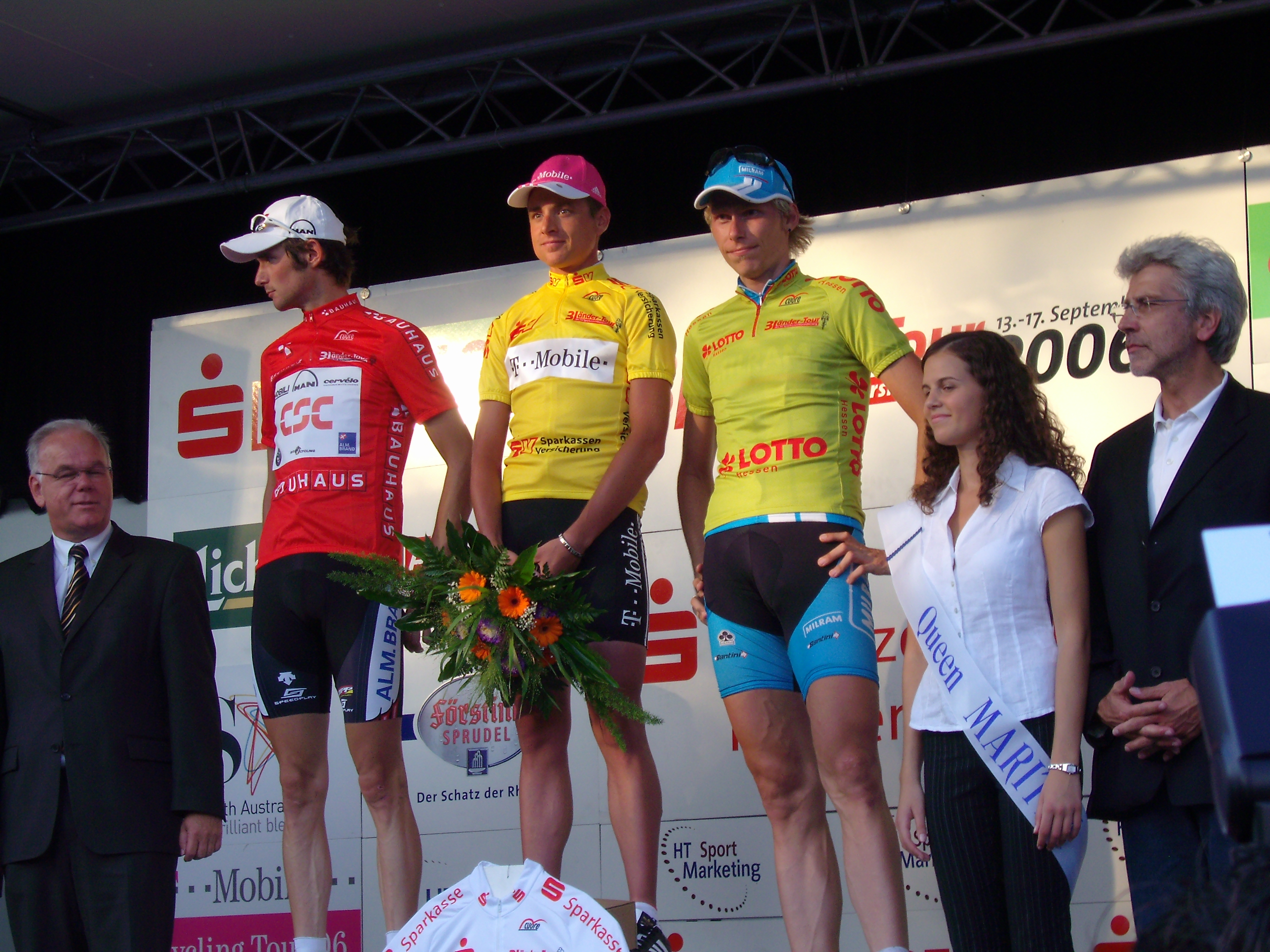
Schleck on the podium as wearer of the mountains jersey after Stage 1 of the 2006 3-Länder-Tour in Kassel, with Patrik Sinkewitz (centre) and Christian Knees (right).

The 2006 season started with a fifth-place finish in Paris–Nice. After a crash in the Tour of the Basque Country, he suffered a concussion. He made his comeback in the Amstel Gold Race that month. Sitting with the favorites with ten kilometers to go, Schleck broke away alone up the Cauberg in Valkenburg for a solo finish while teammate Karsten Kroon disrupted the chase. Three days later he finished 4th in La Flèche Wallonne after a vigorous ride up the Mur de Huy where Spanish rider Alejandro Valverde proved unbeatable. Schleck's form continued days later with the Liège–Bastogne–Liège race, where he rode at the front for much of the latter half and finished 7th. In the Tour de France, he won stage 15 from Gap to Alpe d'Huez, where he broke away from Damiano Cunego 1.5 km from the finish.

=== 2007 ===
The 2007 season started with a 9th-place finish in Paris–Nice. In the Amstel Gold Race, he crashed with 47 km to go, eventually finishing 10th. His recovery continued at La Flèche Wallonne where he finished 7th, but the day before Liège–Bastogne–Liège, it was announced that he had a fractured vertebra. He rode despite the injury and launched the decisive attack a few kilometers from the finish with Danilo Di Luca. Di Luca attacked with one kilometer to go and Schleck faded to 3rd. Schleck won the fourth stage of the Tour de Suisse, taking the yellow jersey; he eventually finished 7th. He could only manage 17th at the Tour de France but was part of the successful attack in the world championship, finishing fourth.

=== 2008 ===
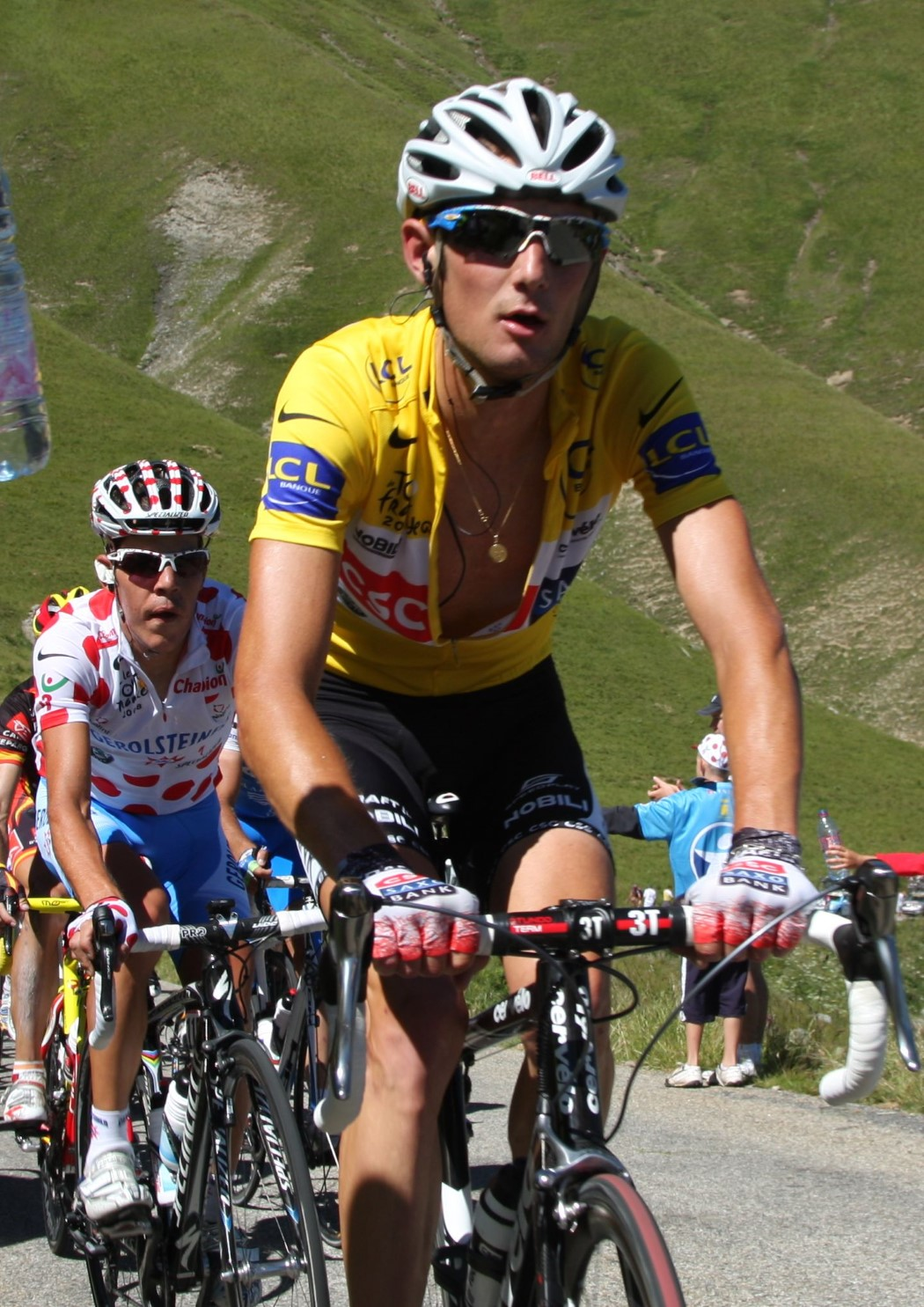
Schleck at the 2008 Tour de France, wearing the race leader's yellow jersey.

In the Amstel Gold Race Schleck finished 2nd, behind Damiano Cunego of Italy. In Liège–Bastogne–Liège Fränk and his talented younger brother Andy Schleck put on a show. Only two riders were able to follow the two brothers when they attacked on the final hills of the day: Alejandro Valverde and Davide Rebellin. Andy had to let the other three riders go and finished 4th; in the final sprint Fränk came 3rd. In the Tour de Suisse Schleck crashed during a dangerous descent and fell into a ravine. Miraculously, he was mostly uninjured. A week later, Schleck became national champion of Luxembourg for the second time in his career.

In the Tour de France he came 3rd in the first mountain stage. This took him to 2nd place in the overall classification, only one second behind the yellow jersey. Eight days later Schleck took the yellow jersey as leader of the general classification after claiming the single second he needed to pass Cadel Evans. He later lost the yellow jersey on Stage 17 to his own teammate, Carlos Sastre. At the end of the Tour he finished in 6th position overall.

=== 2009 ===
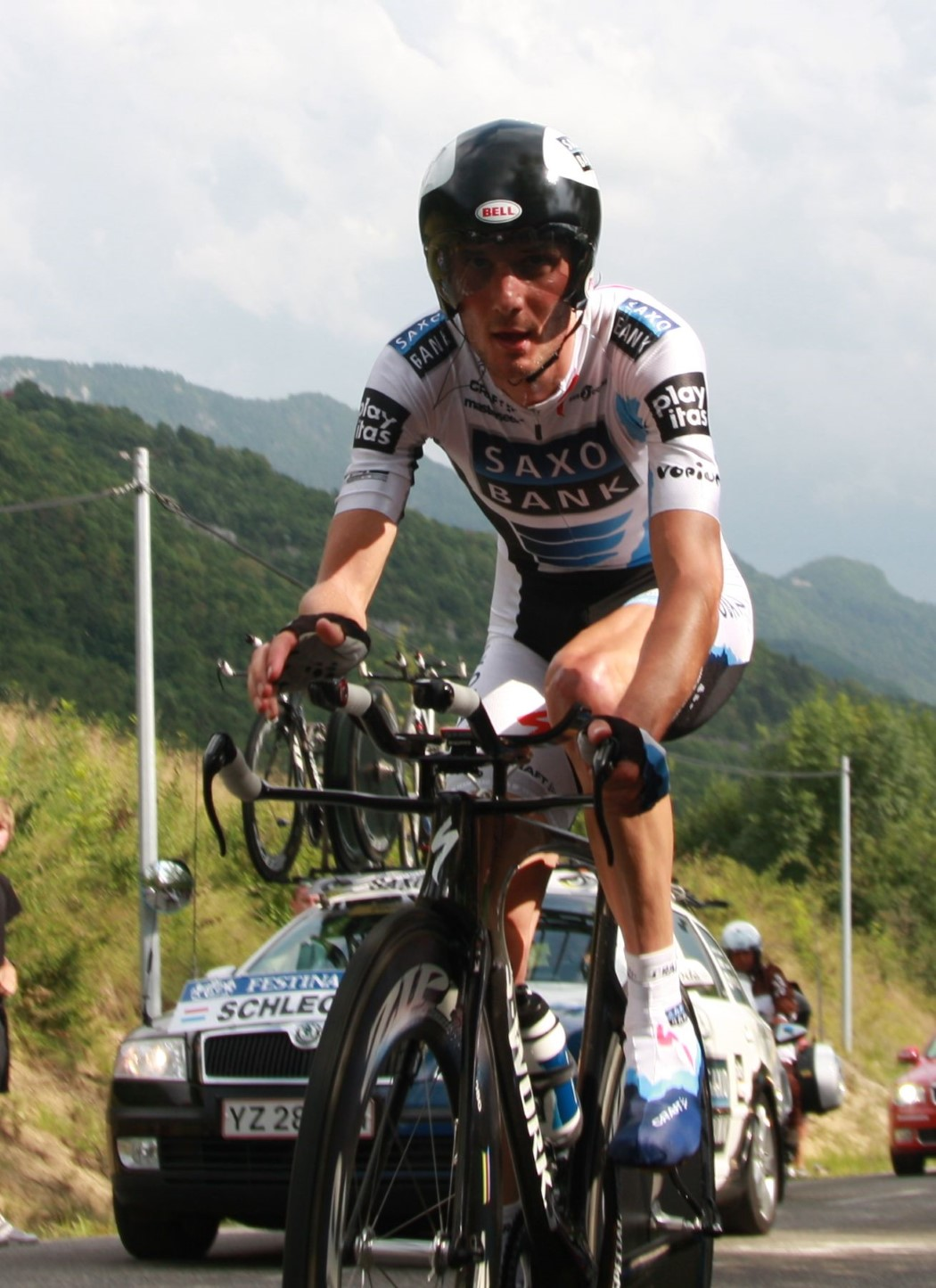
Schleck at the 2009 Tour de France

The 2009 cycling season started with the Tour of California, where Schleck managed to win stage eight. In March, Schleck placed second overall in Paris–Nice. On 19 April, while attempting to repeat his winning 2006 Amstel Gold Race effort, Schleck crashed badly together with Matthew Lloyd. He was taken to hospital with a concussion, but was released the same evening. Schleck made a rapid recovery, winning his home race, the Tour de Luxembourg, in June. No Luxembourgish rider had won the competition since 1983.

On 22 July he won the 17th stage of the Tour de France, reaching the finish line in the company of overall leader Alberto Contador and his own brother, Andy Schleck. He later finished 5th that year.

=== 2010 ===
In 2010, Schleck won Stage 3 in the Tour de Suisse and then he put in a surprise in the final time trial. He ended up winning the race. While riding in Stage 3 of the Tour de France, Schleck suffered a triple fracture of his clavicle, which was sustained on a cobble-stoned section of the stage, and was forced to retire from the race. He later then rode the Vuelta a España where he finished 5th.

On 29 July 2010, Schleck and his brother Andy announced their departure from Team Saxo Bank at the end of 2010. They planned on forming a brand-new Luxembourg-based team, with former Team Saxo Bank director Kim Andersen. In October 2010, one of the managers of the Luxembourg cycling project revealed the team website, which was labeled Leopard True Racing, leading to speculation that the team might race under this name.

=== 2011 ===
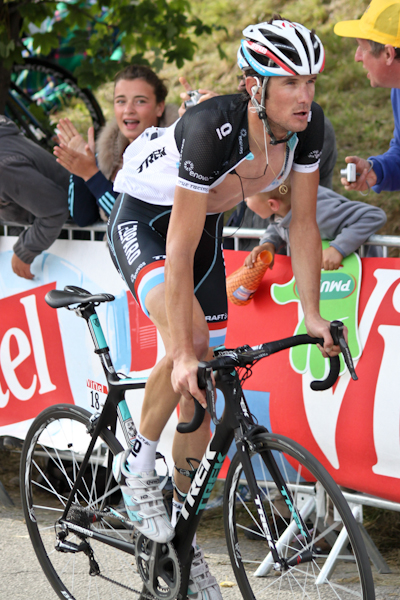
Schleck at the 2011 Tour de France

For the 2011 season, Frank's new team was confirmed as Leopard Trek and Schleck won the Critérium International, before achieving a podium finish at Liège–Bastogne–Liège, and defending his Luxembourg National Road Race title. At the Tour of France, on stage 12, Schleck attacked towards the end of the final climb finishing 3rd on Luz Ardiden. Schleck ended up 2nd overall after the Pyrenees with his brother Andy sitting in 4th. Schleck then finished 2nd on the Col du Galibier behind his brother Andy. However both lost time in the final time trial to Cadel Evans who went on to win the Tour that year. He finished the race in third place with his brother in second, marking the first time in Tour history that siblings had shared the podium. Schleck and his brother remained with RadioShack–Nissan for the 2012 season.

=== 2012–2013 ===
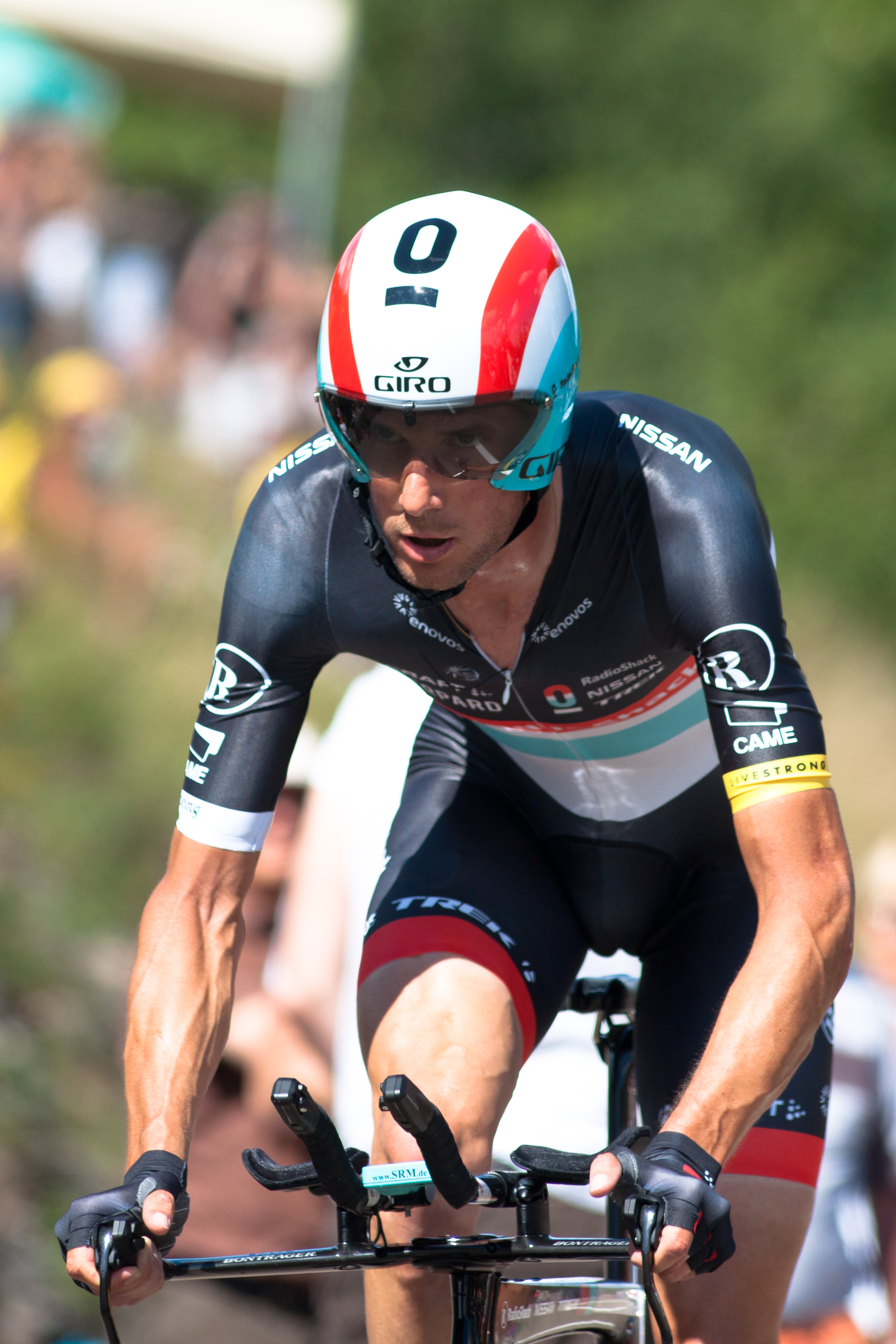
Schleck at the 2012 Tour de France

Schleck started his season slowly as a member of the RadioShack–Nissan team. He decided to ride the Giro d'Italia but withdrew on stage 15. Schleck then showed his form when he finished third in the Tour de Luxembourg and then finished second in the Tour de Suisse. He was then selected to ride the Tour de France. On the 6th stage of the race, Schleck crashed with about 25 km left, and lost just over 2 minutes, seriously hurting his chances of possibly winning the race.

Schleck left the Tour de France after the Union Cycliste Internationale (UCI) revealed he had tested positive for the banned substance diuretic xipamide.

On 4 July 2013 RadioShack–Leopard announced that they would not be renewing Schleck's contract, leaving him without a team. After Trek Bicycles purchased the World Tour licence of the RadioShack–Leopard squad later in the month, it was announced that Schleck would be signed by the team for the 2014 season.

=== 2014–2016 and retirement ===
In 2014, Schleck returned to the Tour de France, but did not ride as a contender; he finished in twelfth place. In 2015, Schleck rode the Vuelta, and won a stage, his first grand tour stage win since 2009.

In 2016, Schleck fell in the Flèche Wallonne and broke his collarbone, which kept him out of contention for the Liège–Bastogne–Liège, but he came back in the Tour de France. At the end of the 2016 season, Schleck retired.

== Doping allegations ==
=== 2008 ===
On 25 July 2008, one day prior to a decisive penultimate stage of the 2008 Tour de France, the German daily newspaper Süddeutsche Zeitung alleged contact between Schleck and the infamous Spanish doctor Eufemiano Fuentes in December 2005. Authorities however stated that they had obtained no evidence to support such a claim. The allegations in connection with Schleck followed a series of strong performances by the rider, who had worn the yellow jersey for several days. His father's car had also been subjected to a detailed search by French customs authorities during the Tour.

Prior to the 2008 UCI Road World Championships in Varese, Italy, on 26 September 2008, the same newspaper published another article on the connections between Schleck and Fuentes after claiming to have seen evidence on a bank transfer of €7,000 from Schleck to a Swiss bank account linked to Fuentes. Evidence was revealed by German police and subsequently confirmed by Luxembourgish prosecutors.

Following Schleck's public admission of such a payment on 3 October 2008, Bjarne Riis and CSC–Saxo Bank decided to suspend Schleck temporarily from any further races until the outcome of the doping allegations towards Schleck had been fully clarified. Schleck was cleared of all allegations by the Luxembourgish antidoping authorities at the beginning of December.

=== 2012 ===
On 17 July 2012, Schleck was removed from the 2012 Tour de France by his team RadioShack–Nissan during the second rest day after his A-sample returned traces of the diuretic Xipamide. Schleck's B-sample confirmed the positive result. Following the positive B-Sample the RadioShack–Nissan team suspended him.

In January 2013, it was announced that Schleck was handed a ban of one year by the Luxembourg Anti-Doping Agency, who specified that Schleck "had not ingested the substance intentionally" and as a result the standard two-year suspension was reduced to twelve months. The ban became effective from the point of the original positive, 14 July 2012.

== Major results ==
1997
1st Road race, National Junior Road Championships
1998
1st Road race, National Junior Road Championships
1999
6th Road race, National Road Championships
2000
National Road Championships

3rd Road race
3rd Time trial

5th Overall Flèche du Sud
9th Road race, UEC European Under-23 Road Championships
2001
1st Road race, Games of the Small States of Europe
1st Road race, National Under-23 Road Championships
7th Giro del Belvedere
2002
National Under-23 Road Championships

1st Road race
1st Time trial

4th La Côte Picarde
7th Paris–Mantes-en-Yvelines
2003
5th Overall Giro della Provincia di Lucca
6th Milano–Torino
2004
2nd Road race, National Road Championships
4th Cholet-Pays de Loire
4th Gran Premio Città di Camaiore
5th Grand Prix of Aargau Canton
9th Overall Paris–Nice
10th Road race, UCI Road World Championships
2005 (1 pro win)
1st Road race, National Road Championships
2nd Overall Tour Méditerranéen

1st Stage 4 (TTT)

2nd Züri-Metzgete
2nd Giro dell'Emilia
3rd Giro di Lombardia
4th Overall Tour de Suisse
7th Overall Paris–Nice
8th Overall Étoile de Bessèges
10th LuK Challenge Chrono (with Luke Roberts)
2006 (2)
1st Amstel Gold Race
2nd Road race, National Road Championships
2nd LuK Challenge Chrono (with Fabian Cancellara)
3rd Overall 3-Länder-Tour

1st Mountains classification

4th La Flèche Wallonne
5th Overall Paris–Nice
5th Trofeo Sóller
6th Overall Tour de Suisse
6th Trofeo Pollença
7th Liège–Bastogne–Liège
7th Giro di Lombardia
10th Overall Tour de France

1st Stage 15

2007 (2)
1st Giro dell'Emilia
2nd Coppa Sabatini
3rd Road race, National Road Championships
3rd Overall Volta a la Comunitat Valenciana
3rd Liège–Bastogne–Liège
4th Road race, UCI Road World Championships
4th Overall 2007 Bayern Rundfahrt
4th Overall 3-Länder-Tour
7th Overall Tour de Suisse

1st Stage 4

7th Overall Tour de Pologne
7th La Flèche Wallonne
8th Overall Paris–Nice
8th Overall Tour of the Basque Country
10th Overall Critérium International
10th Amstel Gold Race
2008 (1)
1st Road race, National Road Championships
1st Stage 1 (TTT) Tour de Pologne
2nd Amstel Gold Race
3rd Overall Tour de Luxembourg
3rd Liège–Bastogne–Liège
5th Overall Tour de France

Held after Stages 15 & 16

6th Overall Critérium International
10th Overall Tour of the Basque Country
10th Tour du Haut Var
2009 (4)
1st Overall Tour de Luxembourg

1st Stage 3

1st Stage 8 Tour of California
2nd Overall Paris–Nice
3rd Road race, National Road Championships
5th Overall Tour de France

1st Stage 17

2010 (4)
National Road Championships

1st Road race
2nd Time trial

1st Overall Tour de Suisse

1st Stage 3

2nd Overall Tour de Luxembourg

1st Stage 2

3rd Klasika Primavera
4th Overall Vuelta a España
7th Amstel Gold Race
8th Liège–Bastogne–Liège
2011 (3)
1st Road race, National Road Championships
1st Overall Critérium International

1st Stage 1

2nd Liège–Bastogne–Liège
3rd Overall Tour de France
6th Clásica de San Sebastián
7th Overall Tour de Suisse
7th La Flèche Wallonne
10th UCI World Tour
2012
2nd Overall Tour de Suisse
3rd Road race, National Road Championships
3rd Overall Tour de Luxembourg
7th Overall Vuelta a Andalucía
2014 (1)
1st Road race, National Road Championships
6th Overall Critérium International
8th Grand Prix de Wallonie
9th Overall Tour de Luxembourg
9th Milano–Torino
2015 (1)
1st Stage 16 Vuelta a España
4th Overall Tour of Utah
9th Trofeo Serra de Tramuntana
2016
3rd Road race, National Road Championships

=== General classification results timeline ===
Grand Tour general classification results timeline
Grand Tour	2003	2004	2005	2006	2007	2008	2009	2010	2011	2012	2013	2014	2015	2016
Giro d'Italia	—	—	42	—	—	—	—	—	—	DNF	—	—	—	—
Tour de France	—	—	—	10	16	5	4	DNF	3	DNF	—	12	—	34
/ Vuelta a España	DNF	46	—	—	—	—	DNF	4	—	—	—	—	24	—
Major stage race general classification results timeline
Race	2003	2004	2005	2006	2007	2008	2009	2010	2011	2012	2013	2014	2015	2016
Paris–Nice	69	9	7	5	8	DNF	2	15	DNF	24	—	34	—	DNF
/ Tirreno–Adriatico	Did not contest during his career													
Volta a Catalunya	—	—	—	—	—	—	—	22	—	—	—	—	—	—
Tour of the Basque Country	—	—	—	DNF	8	10	DNF	DNF	16	24	—	DNF	57	27
Tour de Romandie	DNF	DNF	DNF	—	—	—	—	—	—	—	—	—	—	
Critérium du Dauphiné	Did not contest during his career													
Tour de Suisse	42	30	4	6	7	DNF	DNF	1	7	2	—	DNF	DNF	19

=== Classics results timeline ===
Monument	2002	2003	2004	2005	2006	2007	2008	2009	2010	2011	2012	2013	2014	2015	2016
Milan–San Remo	—	—	—	31	20	29	52	—	—	—	—	—	—	—	—
Tour of Flanders	Did not contest during his career														
Paris–Roubaix	Did not contest during his career														
Liège–Bastogne–Liège	—	DNF	77	62	7	3	3	23	8	2	23	—	19	DNF	—
Giro di Lombardia	—	17	—	3	7	13	—	—	—	—	—	—	24	38	29
Classic	2002	2003	2004	2005	2006	2007	2008	2009	2010	2011	2012	2013	2014	2015	2016
Amstel Gold Race	—	100	66	97	1	10	2	DNF	7	22	12	—	24	56	DNF
La Flèche Wallonne	—	DNF	94	27	4	7	78	—	40	7	20	—	56	58	DNF
Clásica de San Sebastián	—	—	34	—	21	26	—	—	—	5	—	—	DNF	—	—
Giro dell'Emilia	—	—	—	2	17	1	—	—	—	—	—	—	—	—	15
Milano–Torino	43	6	—	—	—	—	Not held				—	—	9	DNF	32

=== Major championship results timeline ===
	1999	2000	2001	2002	2003	2004	2005	2006	2007	2008	2009	2010	2011	2012	2013	2014	2015	2016
World Championships	—	—	—	—	—	10	—	29	4	41	—	16	DNF	—	—	—	—	—
National Championships	6	3	—	—	—	2	1	2	3	1	3	1	1	3	—	1	—	3

Legend
—	Did not compete
DNF	Did not finish
