= Michael Albasini =

Swiss road bicycle racer (born 1980)

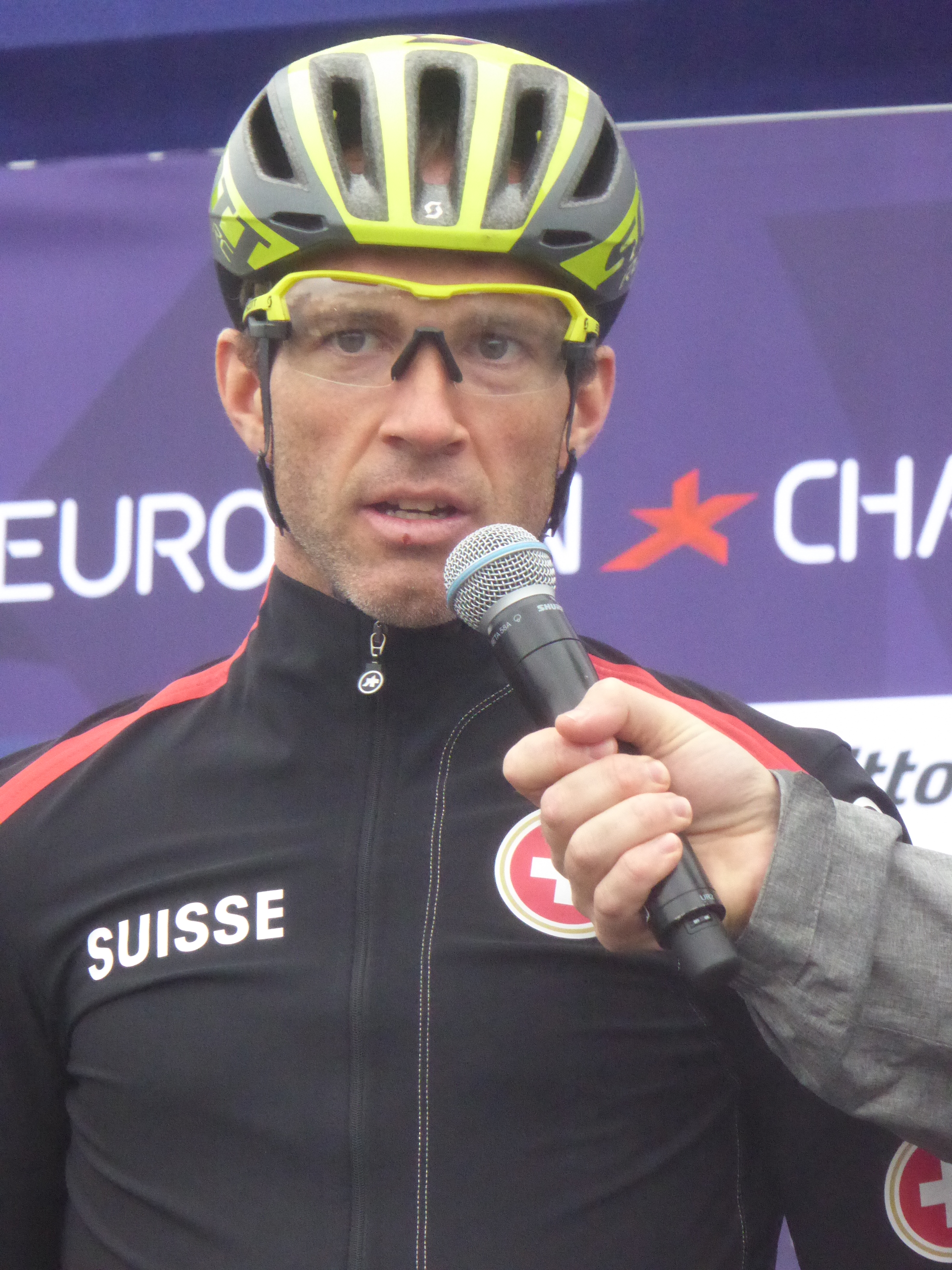
- Albasini at the 2018 European Road Cycling Championships

Personal information
- Nickname: Alba
- Born: 20 December 1980 (age 45) Vevey, Switzerland
- Height: 1.72 m (5 ft 8 in)
- Weight: 65 kg (143 lb)

Cycling career
- Sport: Cycling
- Current team: Retired
- Discipline: Road
- Role: Rider
- Rider type: Puncheur

Amateur teams
- 2000–2002: VC Mendrisio
- 2001: Fassa Bortolo (stagiaire)

Professional teams
- 2003–2004: Phonak
- 2005–2008: Liquigas–Bianchi
- 2009–2011: Team Columbia–High Road
- 2012–2020: GreenEDGE

Major wins
- Grand Tours Tour de France 1 TTT stage (2013) Vuelta a España 1 individual stage (2011) Stage races Volta a Catalunya (2012) Tour of Austria (2009) Tour of Britain (2010) Tour des Fjords (2018) One-day races and Classics Tre Valli Varesine (2014) Grand Prix of Aargau Canton (2011, 2013)

Michael Albasini (born 20 December 1980) is a Swiss former professional road bicycle racer, who rode professionally between 2003 and 2020, for the Phonak, Liquigas, HTC–Highroad and Mitchelton–Scott teams.

== Professional career ==
Albasini began his career in 2003 with Phonak, moved to Liquigas–Bianchi at the beginning of 2005, and signed with Team Columbia–High Road for the 2009 season. From 2012 until his retirement, Albasini rode with the Australian professional cycling team GreenEDGE.

In 2012, Albasini met success at the UCI World Tour race Volta a Catalunya. The six-stage event contained no time trials, and Albasini took the lead by triumphing on the very first stage over Anthony Delaplace from Saur–Sojasun, getting a 42 seconds overall lead. On the very next stage, he was part of a select group of about 20 riders that were led to the line by Bradley Wiggins after a day in the mountains and he outsprinted his rivals, taking his second win in a row. He held on to his advantage on the following hilly stages, winning the overall classification by 1 minute and 30 seconds over second-placed Samuel Sánchez of Euskaltel–Euskadi.

In 2015, Albasini took a prestigious podium placing at the La Flèche Wallonne, coming in third place atop the Mur de Huy behind Alejandro Valverde and Julian Alaphilippe. He later won the second stage of the Tour de Romandie, having the better in the sprint of a group of 49 riders who had survived the climb and descent of the Col de la Vue des Alpes. He repeated the feat the very next day in Porrentruy, winning by a couple of bike lengths over Julian Alaphilippe. He had to abandon the Tour de France on Stage 5, suffering from a broken arm after a crash.

In October 2019, Albasini announced that he would retire from the sport after the 2020 Tour de Suisse. Following that race's cancellation due to the COVID-19 pandemic in Switzerland, Albasini announced that he intended to extend his career to the end of the 2020 season.

== Major results ==
1998
1st Road race, National Junior Road Championships
2001
4th Overall Ster Elektrotoer
6th Overall Grand Prix Guillaume Tell
2002
1st Road race, UEC European Under-23 Road Championships
5th Overall Grand Prix Guillaume Tell
7th Overall GP Kranj

1st Stage 1

7th Giro del Lago Maggiore
2004
5th Züri-Metzgete
9th Paris–Bourges
2005
Tour de Suisse

1st Sprints classification
1st Stage 5

7th Overall Three Days of De Panne
10th Giro della Romagna
2006
Tour de Suisse

1st Mountains classification
1st Sprints classification

3rd Grand Prix de Fourmies
2007
5th Overall Circuit de la Sarthe

1st Stage 4

2008
2nd Overall Tour de Luxembourg

1st Stage 3

2nd GP Miguel Induráin
3rd Overall Tour Méditerranéen
6th Tour du Haut Var
7th La Flèche Wallonne
8th Gran Premio di Lugano
2009
1st Overall Tour of Austria

1st Stage 2

1st Stage 4 Tour of the Basque Country
1st Stage 5 Tour de Suisse
9th La Flèche Wallonne
2010
1st Overall Tour of Britain

1st Stage 3

4th Overall Tour de Pologne
10th La Flèche Wallonne
2011
1st Grand Prix of Aargau Canton
1st Stage 13 Vuelta a España
1st Mountains classification, Tour of the Basque Country
3rd Overall Bayern Rundfahrt

1st Stage 3

4th Overall Tour of Oman
2012
1st Overall Volta a Catalunya

1st Stages 1 & 2

1st Stage 8 Tour de Suisse
2nd Road race, National Road Championships
2nd La Flèche Wallonne
4th Grand Prix of Aargau Canton
2013
1st Grand Prix of Aargau Canton
1st Stage 4 Paris–Nice
1st Stage 4 (TTT) Tour de France
2014
1st Tre Valli Varesine
Tour de Romandie

1st Stages 1, 2 & 4

2nd Road race, National Road Championships
5th Grand Prix of Aargau Canton
6th Giro di Lombardia
7th Trofeo Muro-Port d'Alcúdia
7th La Flèche Wallonne
2015
Tour de Romandie

1st Stages 2 & 3

2nd Grand Prix of Aargau Canton
3rd La Flèche Wallonne
2016
Tour de Romandie

1st Points classification
1st Stage 5

2nd Liège–Bastogne–Liège
7th La Flèche Wallonne
2017
1st Coppa Agostoni
1st Stage 2 Tour of the Basque Country
1st Stage 1 Tour de Romandie
2nd Vuelta a La Rioja
3rd Amstel Gold Race
4th Grand Prix of Aargau Canton
4th Coppa Bernocchi
4th Gran Premio Bruno Beghelli
5th La Flèche Wallonne
7th Road race, UCI Road World Championships
7th Liège–Bastogne–Liège
10th Tre Valli Varesine
2018
1st Overall Tour des Fjords

1st Points classification
1st Stage 2

7th Road race, UEC European Road Championships
2019
4th Time trial, National Road Championships
10th Grand Prix of Aargau Canton
10th Coppa Sabatini

=== Grand Tour general classification results timeline ===
Grand Tour	2004	2005	2006	2007	2008	2009	2010	2011	2012	2013	2014	2015	2016	2017	2018
Giro d'Italia	87	—	—	—	—	—	123	—	—	—	—	—	—	—	—
Tour de France	—	145	115	58	—	—	—	—	110	86	70	DNF	132	98	—
/ Vuelta a España	—	—	—	—	—	DNF	—	122	—	—	—	—	—	—	118

=== Classics results timeline ===
Monument	2003	2004	2005	2006	2007	2008	2009	2010	2011	2012	2013	2014	2015	2016	2017	2018	2019	2020
Milan–San Remo	—	—	—	—	—	118	—	DNF	109	—	—	—	—	122	45	—	—	130
Tour of Flanders	DNF	DNF	DNF	DNF	—	—	—	—	—	—	—	—	—	—	—	—	—	—
Paris–Roubaix	—	DNF	DNF	—	DNF	—	—	—	—	—	—	—	—	—	—	—	—	NH
Liège–Bastogne–Liège	DNF	—	DNF	—	DNF	—	64	97	87	75	51	95	56	2	7	DNF	70	76
Giro di Lombardia	—	—	—	—	—	—	—	DNF	DNF	DNF	DNF	6	DNF	—	DNF	DNF	—	DNF
Classic	2003	2004	2005	2006	2007	2008	2009	2010	2011	2012	2013	2014	2015	2016	2017	2018	2019	2020
Amstel Gold Race	—	—	DNF	DNF	79	69	15	41	62	87	55	DNF	69	57	3	DNF	60	NH
La Flèche Wallonne	DNF	—	DNF	—	DNF	7	9	10	11	2	21	7	3	7	5	DNF	DNF	49
Clásica de San Sebastián	—	—	—	—	21	—	—	—	—	DNF	DNF	32	—	70	DNF	—	—	NH

Legend
—	Did not compete
DNF	Did not finish
NH	Not held
