= 2016 Liège–Bastogne–Liège =

2016 UCI World Tour, race 13 of 28

Race details
- Dates: 24 April 2016
- Stages: 1
- Distance: 248 km (154 mi)
- Winning time: 6h 24' 29"

Results
	Winner	Wout Poels (NED)	(Team Sky)
	Second	Michael Albasini (SUI)	(Orica–GreenEDGE)
	Third	Rui Costa (POR)	(Lampre–Merida)

The 2016 Liège–Bastogne–Liège was a one-day classic cycling race that took place on 24 April 2016. It was the fourth cycling monument of the 2016 season and was the thirteenth event of the 2016 UCI World Tour. The race came at the end of the spring classics season.

The race took place on a 248-kilometre (154 mi) route that started in Liège, headed to Bastogne and returned to Liège before ending in Ans. The route included many hills, especially in the final 70 kilometres (43 mi), which were the principal difficulty in the race. Originally the race was scheduled to take place on a 253-kilometre (157 mi) route, but due to the bad weather conditions the race was shortened. Alejandro Valverde (Movistar Team) was the defending champion and was among the favourites for victory, following his victory in La Flèche Wallonne the previous week.

The decisive move in the race came in the final classified climb of the day, the Côte de la Rue Naniot, where Michael Albasini (Orica–GreenEDGE) initiated a four-man breakaway. The group contested the sprint for victory, with Wout Poels (Team Sky) winning ahead of Albasini and Lampre–Merida's Rui Costa.

== Route ==
Although the majority of the route was the same as in previous years, there were some significant changes to the route compared to the 2015 edition. The Côte de Stockeu, which had previously been part of a trio of climbs that came with 100 kilometres (62 mi) to go to the finish, was omitted due to roadworks. Instead, a new climb was inserted between the Côte de San Nicolas and the finish line in Ans. This climb, the Côte de la Rue Naniot, was in the suburbs of Liège and was a steep, straight, cobbled road. The 600 metres (660 yd) of the climb were at an average gradient of 10.5%; the summit came with 2.5 kilometres (1.6 mi) to the finish.

In general, the route took the riders from the start in Liège south to Bastogne. With 106.5 kilometres (66.2 mi) covered, the route turned to the north and took the riders back to Liège. The second leg of the race was significantly longer at 146.5 kilometres (91.0 mi), taking the riders north-east to Spa before turning west to the finish. The race finished in Ans, just to the west of Liège.

Liège–Bastogne–Liège is the last of the three Ardennes classics and is the closing race of the spring classics season. The Ardennes classics are three races that cover courses with many short, steep hills. It is also one of the so-called monuments of the sport, considered to be the most prestigious in cycling. The principal difficulty in the 2016 Liège–Bastogne–Liège came from the ten classified climbs, most of which came in the last part of the race. There was one climb, the Côte de la Roche-en-Ardenne, before the peloton reached Bastogne. After the turn, there was another climb, the Côte de Saint-Roch, before the most difficult section of the race, the final 85 kilometres (53 mi). This included the Côte de Wanne, the Côte de la Haute-Levée, the Col du Rosier and the Col du Maquisard. With 35 kilometres (22 mi) remaining, the riders came to the Côte de La Redoute, described by Cyclingnews.com as the race's "most hallowed site". This is a 2-kilometre (1.2 mi) climb at an average gradient of 8.9%. Around 15 kilometres (9.3 mi) later came the Côte de la Roche-aux-Faucons – 1.3 kilometres (0.81 mi) at 11% – and then the descent into the outskirts of Liège. In the final 10 kilometres (6.2 mi) were two climbs: the Côte de San Nicolas – 1.2 kilometres (0.75 mi) at 8.6% – and the Côte de la Rue Naniot. The race then finished with a final 1,500-metre (1,600 yd), unclassified climb to the finish line in Ans.

There was a last-minute route change due to the weather conditions. No climbing was altered, but a section of the route between Liège and the day's first climb was changed to avoid snow-affected areas.

== Teams ==
The race organisers invited 25 teams to participate in the 2016 Liège–Bastogne–Liège. As it is a UCI World Tour event, all 18 WorldTeams were invited automatically and were obliged to send a squad. An additional seven UCI Professional Continental teams were given wildcard entries. These included three French teams (Cofidis, Direct Énergie and Fortuneo–Vital Concept), two Belgian teams (Topsport Vlaanderen–Baloise and Wanty–Groupe Gobert), a Dutch team (Roompot–Oranje Peloton) and a German team (Bora–Argon 18). Each team was entitled to enter eight riders, so the start list included 200 riders.

UCI WorldTeams

- AG2R La Mondiale
- Astana
- BMC Racing Team
- Team Dimension Data
- Etixx–Quick-Step
- FDJ
- IAM Cycling
- Lampre–Merida
- Lotto–Soudal
- Movistar Team
- Team Giant–Alpecin
- Team Katusha
- LottoNL–Jumbo
- Team Sky
- Tinkoff
- Trek–Segafredo
- Cannondale
- Orica–GreenEDGE

UCI Professional Continental teams

- Bora–Argon 18
- Cofidis
- Direct Énergie
- Fortuneo–Vital Concept
- Roompot–Oranje Peloton
- Topsport Vlaanderen–Baloise
- Wanty–Groupe Gobert

== Pre-race favourites ==
The principal favourite for victory in the race was the defending champion, Movistar Team's Alejandro Valverde. Valverde had won the race on three previous occasions – in 2006, 2008 and 2015. In 2006 and 2015 he had also won La Flèche Wallonne; after winning the 2016 edition of that race earlier in the week, Valverde was seeking to win an unprecedented third "Ardennes double". Valverde had the advantage of climbing better than most sprinters and sprinting better than most climbers.

Two of the main challengers to Valverde came from the Etixx–Quick-Step team. These were Dan Martin, the 2013 champion, and Julian Alaphilippe, who had been second behind Valverde in 2015; they had finished second and third behind Valverde on the Mur de Huy in La Flèche Wallonne the previous week. Martin said after that race that he expected to gain a greater tactical advantage by having two riders in Liège–Bastogne–Liège. Other potential winners included three Orica–GreenEDGE riders (the 2014 champion, Simon Gerrans, along with Simon Yates and Adam Yates), Team Katusha's Joaquim Rodríguez, Team Sky's Michał Kwiatkowski and Wout Poels (who were supported by the reigning Tour de France champion, Chris Froome) and Enrico Gasparotto (Wanty–Groupe Gobert), who had won the Amstel Gold Race the previous Sunday and performed strongly in La Flèche Wallonne as well.

== Race summary ==
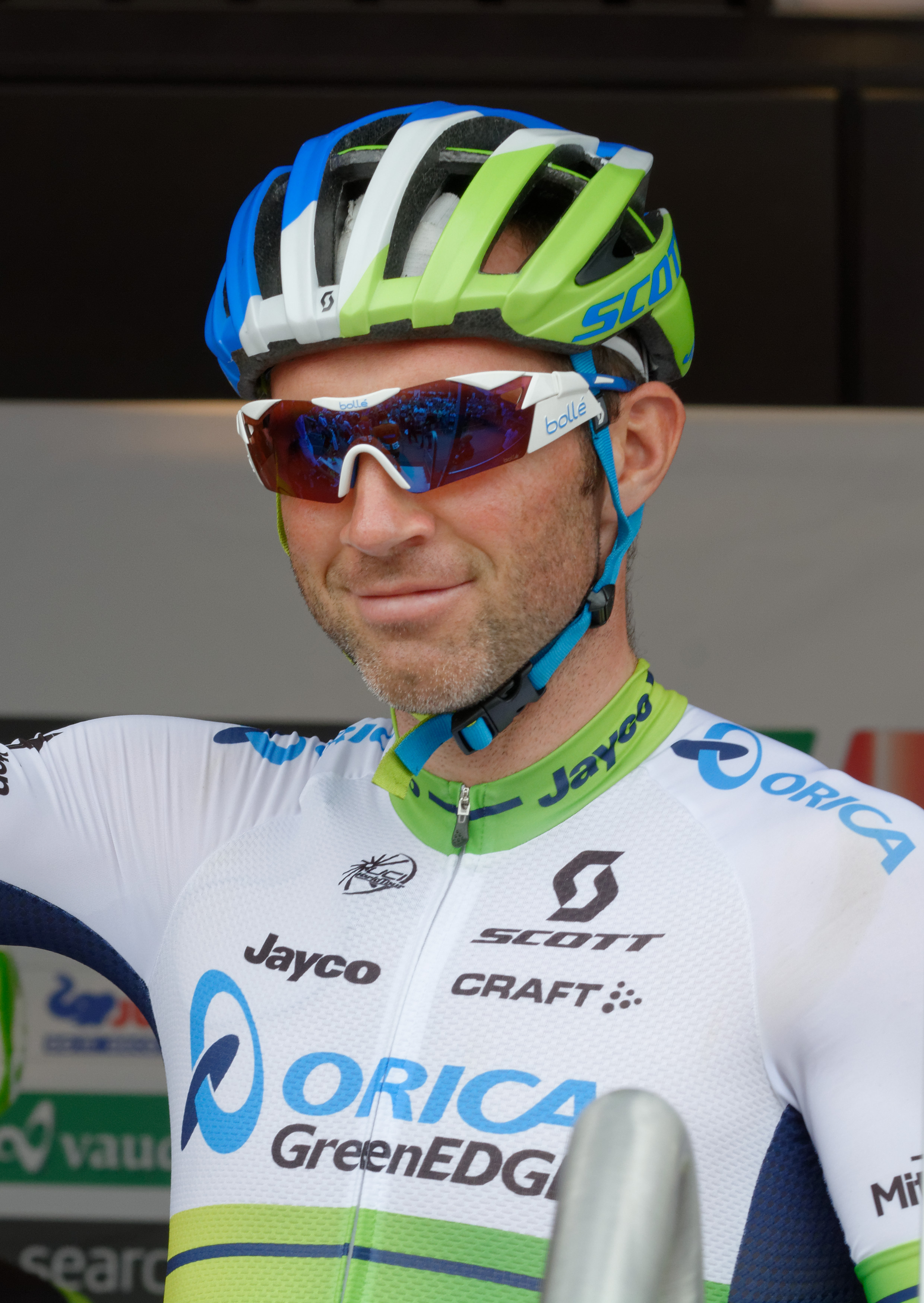
Orica–GreenEDGE's Michael Albasini (photographed at the 2015 Tour de Suisse) initiated the decisive attack on the final climb of the day, the Côte de la Rue Naniot.

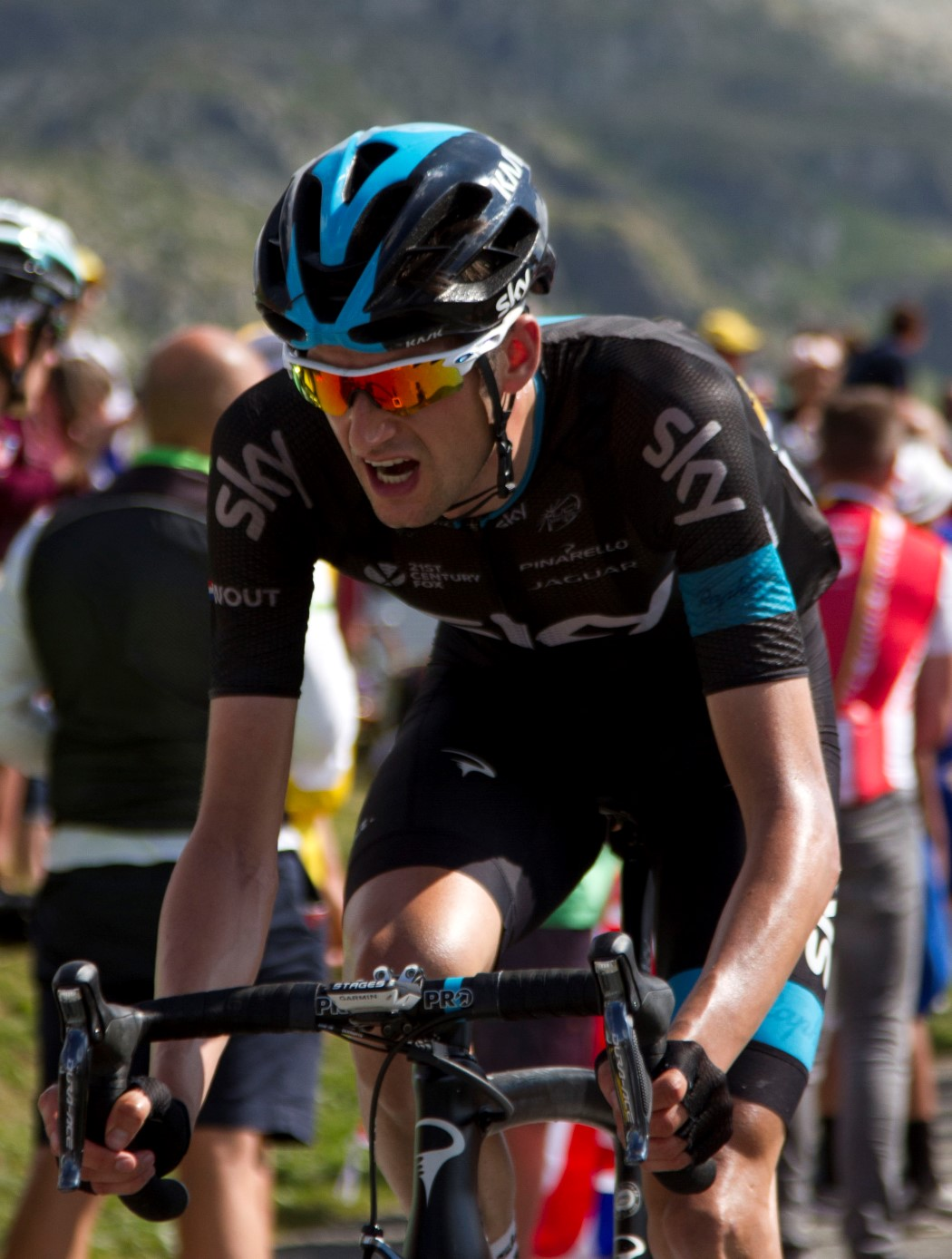
Team Sky's Wout Poels (photographed at the 2015 Tour de France) won the four-man sprint in Ans.

The race took place in cold, snowy conditions, with low visibility in the early part of the race. By the time the breakaway formed, an hour into the day's racing, Fortuneo–Vital Concept's Julien Loubet had already abandoned; he was one of 46 riders not to finish the race. The breakaway was initially composed of seven riders: Paolo Tiralongo (Astana), Alessandro De Marchi (BMC), Pavel Brutt (Tinkoff), Nicolas Edet (Cofidis), Jérémy Roy (FDJ), Thomas De Gendt (Lotto–Soudal) and Cesare Benedetti (Bora–Argon 18). With 50 kilometres (31 mi) completed, IAM Cycling's Vegard Stake Laengen bridged across from the peloton to the breakaway; the eight-man group built a lead that reached nine minutes. The peloton was controlled first by Etixx–Quick-Step and then by Movistar and the gap was reduced to four minutes by the Côte de Wanne, with 84 kilometres (52 mi) remaining.

Shortly afterwards, Chris Froome was involved in a minor crash, although he was quickly able to rejoin the peloton. By this point, the peloton was riding into a headwind, with the weather conditions changing repeatedly between rain and snow. On the Col de Rosier, with the gap reduced to around two minutes, Thomas Voeckler and Lilian Calmejane (both Direct Énergie), and Adam Yates (Orica–GreenEDGE) attacked from the peloton, while De Marchi and Edet broke away from the rest of the leading group. Calmejane and Yates were unable to stay with Voeckler, who crossed the summit of the climb on his own. Shortly afterwards, Tony Gallopin crashed and was forced to abandon the race. Approaching the Col de la Redoute, De Gendt caught De Marchi and Edet to form a lead group of three riders, while the peloton – now just 30 seconds behind – caught Voeckler. Astana's Andriy Hrivko attacked on the climb and caught up with De Gendt, who had again been dropped by Edet and De Marchi.

The peloton caught the breakaway groups on the descent from the Côte de La Roche-aux-Faucons, with Etixx–Quick-Step driving the pace. On the approach to the Côte de Saint-Nicholas, Carlos Betancur (Movistar) attacked; there were then attacks from Kwiatkowski and Hrivko. With Betancur again attacking on the climb, Vincenzo Nibali (Astana) and Simon Gerrans were dropped. At the top of the climb, there were attacks from Romain Bardet (AG2R La Mondiale), Diego Rosa (Astana) and Ilnur Zakarin (Katusha); they were brought back, however, by the foot of the final climb of the day, the Côte de la Rue Naniot, with the peloton now reduced to fewer than 30 riders.

The peloton was split by the steep gradient of the climb. After Julien Alaphilippe made a failed attempt to escape the group, Michael Albasini (Orica–GreenEDGE) attacked around half-way up and only Rui Costa (Lampre–Merida), Samuel Sánchez (BMC) and Wout Poels (Sky) were able to follow. With 1.5 kilometres (0.9 mi) remaining, they had a five-second lead, but few of the riders in the chasing group had teammates with them, so there was no coordinated effort to close the gap. On the final ascent to the line, there were attacks from Albasini and Poels, although neither was able to get away from the group. Ilnur Zakarin attacked from the peloton, but was unable to come across to the leading group. Going around the final corner, with 250 metres (270 yd) remaining, Poels was the first to sprint. Albasini followed him but was unable to come past. Poels crossed the line first, with Albasini second and Costa third. Sánchez was four seconds behind in fourth, with Zakarin a further five seconds back in fifth. Warren Barguil (Team Giant–Alpecin) was the first to finish from the chasing group, eleven seconds behind Poels.

== Result ==
Result (top 10)
Rank	Rider	Team	Time
1	Wout Poels (NED)	Team Sky	6h 24' 29"
2	Michael Albasini (SUI)	Orica–GreenEDGE	+ 0"
3	Rui Costa (POR)	Lampre–Merida	+ 0"
4	Samuel Sánchez (ESP)	BMC Racing Team	+ 4"
5	Ilnur Zakarin (RUS)	Team Katusha	+ 9"
6	Warren Barguil (FRA)	Team Giant–Alpecin	+ 11"
7	Roman Kreuziger (CZE)	Tinkoff	+ 12"
8	Joaquim Rodríguez (ESP)	Team Katusha	+ 12"
9	Bauke Mollema (NED)	Trek–Segafredo	+ 12"
10	Diego Rosa (ITA)	Astana	+ 12"

== Post-race analysis ==
=== Reactions ===
Poels's victory was his first ever in a one-day race. It was also the first ever victory in any of the cycling monuments for Team Sky and the first Liège–Bastogne–Liège victory by a Dutch rider in 28 years. Cyclingnews.com described it as the "biggest result of his career". Poels himself said that he had felt good all day and had been warm throughout, despite the weather; he joked that he "really liked" the Côte de la Rue Naniot. He suggested that he was improving as a rider following his move from Etixx–Quick-Step to Sky two years previously, especially in his ability to stay near the front of the peloton throughout the race.

Albasini was not originally Orica–GreenEDGE's leader; he inherited the role after Simon Gerrans was dropped towards the end of the race. He said that he thought he was the strongest of the four-man group that formed on the final climb and blamed a mistake for his failure to win: he said that he had chosen the wrong gearing for the sprint and was unable to match Poels's acceleration. He said that he had ridden "a good race" even though he had failed to win. Albasini's performance came at the end of a strong spring classics season for his team, following Mathew Hayman's victory at Paris–Roubaix two weeks previously. Costa, meanwhile, said "It was the toughest day on a bike that I can remember" and "when it's bad weather, my body seems to react well". He congratulated Poels, saying that he was stronger in the sprint.

Alejandro Valverde said that he had been mistaken in his belief that the Côte de la Rue Naniot would not be decisive. It was his worst performance in the race since 2012, but he said that he felt he was in strong form ahead of the Giro d'Italia. Dan Martin said that the weather conditions had forced the riders to ride in a conservative manner, since nobody could attack when it was so cold. Both he and Julian Alaphilippe blamed the weather for their failure to be in the final selection. Alaphilippe said "This is the first time in my life I had to do a race in such bad weather. We riders have a dog's life sometimes."

=== UCI World Tour standings ===
In the season-long 2016 UCI World Tour competition, Peter Sagan (Tinkoff) remained in first place overall, 49 points ahead of his teammate Alberto Contador. Poels's victory earned him 100 points and moved him up to ninth place, while Ilnur Zakarin moved up to tenth. Spain moved back into the lead of the nations' standings and Tinkoff retained the lead of the teams' standings, although Sky were now within 100 points of the lead. Despite Barguil's sixth-place finish, Team Giant–Alpecin remained in last place in the team standings.

UCI World Tour standings on 24 April 2016
Rank	Rider	Team	Points
1	Peter Sagan (SVK)	Tinkoff	329
2	Alberto Contador (ESP)	Tinkoff	280
3	Richie Porte (AUS)	BMC Racing Team	222
4	Sergio Henao (COL)	Team Sky	204
5	Sep Vanmarcke (BEL)	LottoNL–Jumbo	201
6	Nairo Quintana (COL)	Movistar Team	178
7	Fabian Cancellara (SUI)	Trek–Segafredo	166
8	Greg Van Avermaet (BEL)	BMC Racing Team	162
9	Wout Poels (NED)	Team Sky	147
10	Ilnur Zakarin (RUS)	Team Katusha	146

== Sources ==
- "Road Races > Roadbooks > 2015 Roadbooks > Liege Bastogne Liege". velorooms.com.
- "Road Races > Roadbooks > 2016 Roadbooks > Liege Bastogne Liege". velorooms.com.
