= 2010 Tour de Suisse =

2010 UCI World Ranking, race 16 of 26

Race details
- Dates: 12—20 June 2010
- Stages: 9
- Distance: 1,353 km (840.7 mi)
- Winning time: 35h 02' 00"

Results
Jersey awarded to the overall winner	Winner	Fränk Schleck (LUX)	(Team Saxo Bank)
	Second	Void	
	Third	Jakob Fuglsang (DEN)	(Team Saxo Bank)
Jersey awarded to the points classification winner	Points	Marcus Burghardt (GER)	(BMC Racing Team)
Jersey awarded to the mountains classification winner	Mountains	Mathias Frank (SUI)	(BMC Racing Team)
Jersey awarded to the sprints classification winner	Sprints	Mathias Frank (SUI)	(BMC Racing Team)
	Team	Team Saxo Bank	

The 2010 Tour de Suisse was the 74th edition of the Tour de Suisse stage race. It took place from 12 June to 20 June and was part of both the 2010 UCI ProTour and the World Calendar. It began with a short individual time trial in Lugano and ended with another time trial, in Liestal. The race was won by Fränk Schleck.

== Stages ==
=== Stage 1 ===
12 June 2010 – Lugano, 7.6 km (Individual time trial)

Stage and General classification after Stage 1

	Cyclist	Team	Time
1	Fabian Cancellara (SUI)	Team Saxo Bank	10' 21"
2	Roman Kreuziger (CZE)	Liquigas–Doimo	+ 1"
3	Tony Martin (GER)	Team HTC–Columbia	+ 3"
4	Peter Sagan (SVK)	Liquigas–Doimo	+ 3"
5	Dries Devenyns (BEL)	Quick-Step	+ 10"
6	Gustav Larsson (SWE)	Team Saxo Bank	+ 11"
7	Thomas Löfkvist (SWE)	Team Sky	+ 12"
8	Manuel Quinziato (ITA)	Liquigas–Doimo	+ 13"
9	Simon Gerrans (AUS)	Team Sky	+ 13"
10	Jakob Fuglsang (DEN)	Team Saxo Bank	+ 13"

=== Stage 2 ===
13 June 2010 – Ascona to Sierre, 167.5 km

Stage 2 Result

	Cyclist	Team	Time
1	Heinrich Haussler (GER)	Cervélo TestTeam	4h 25' 16"
2	Pablo Urtasun (ESP)	Euskaltel–Euskadi	s.t.
3	Marco Marcato (ITA)	Vacansoleil	s.t.
4	Óscar Freire (ESP)	Rabobank	s.t.
5	Gerald Ciolek (GER)	Team Milram	s.t.
6	José Joaquín Rojas (ESP)	Caisse d'Epargne	s.t.
7	Fabio Felline (ITA)	Footon–Servetto–Fuji	s.t.
8	Simon Gerrans (AUS)	Team Sky	s.t.
9	Francesco Gavazzi (ITA)	Lampre–Farnese Vini	s.t.
10	Carlos Barredo (ESP)	Quick-Step	s.t.

General classification after Stage 2

	Rider	Team	Time
1	Fabian Cancellara (SUI)	Team Saxo Bank	4h 35' 37"
2	Roman Kreuziger (CZE)	Liquigas–Doimo	+ 1"
3	Tony Martin (GER)	Team HTC–Columbia	+ 3"
4	Dries Devenyns (BEL)	Quick-Step	+ 10"
5	Gustav Larsson (SWE)	Team Saxo Bank	+ 11"
6	Thomas Löfkvist (SWE)	Team Sky	+ 12"
7	Simon Gerrans (AUS)	Team Sky	+ 13"
8	Jakob Fuglsang (DEN)	Team Saxo Bank	+ 13"
9	Bauke Mollema (NED)	Rabobank	+ 14"
10	Jonathan Castroviejo (ESP)	Euskaltel–Euskadi	+ 14"

=== Stage 3 ===
14 June 2010 – Sierre to Schwarzenburg, 196.6 km

Stage 3 Result

	Cyclist	Team	Time
1	Fränk Schleck (LUX)	Team Saxo Bank	5h 02' 21"
2	Rigoberto Urán (COL)	Caisse d'Epargne	s.t.
3	Bauke Mollema (NED)	Rabobank	+ 3"
4	Steve Morabito (SUI)	BMC Racing Team	+ 3"
5	Matteo Carrara (ITA)	Vacansoleil	+ 3"
6	Juan Manuel Gárate (ESP)	Rabobank	+ 3"
7	Robert Gesink (NED)	Rabobank	+ 3"
8	Thomas Löfkvist (SWE)	Team Sky	+ 3"
9	Nicolas Roche (IRL)	Ag2r–La Mondiale	+ 3"
10	Tony Martin (GER)	Team HTC–Columbia	+ 3"

General classification after Stage 3

	Rider	Team	Time
1	Tony Martin (GER)	Team HTC–Columbia	9h 38' 04"
2	Fabian Cancellara (SUI)	Team Saxo Bank	+ 1"
3	Thomas Löfkvist (SWE)	Team Sky	+ 9"
4	Rigoberto Urán (COL)	Caisse d'Epargne	+ 10"
5	Dries Devenyns (BEL)	Quick-Step	+ 11"
6	Fränk Schleck (LUX)	Team Saxo Bank	+ 13"
7	Jakob Fuglsang (DEN)	Team Saxo Bank	+ 14"
8	Steve Morabito (SUI)	BMC Racing Team	+ 14"
9	Jonathan Castroviejo (ESP)	Euskaltel–Euskadi	+ 15"
10	Bauke Mollema (NED)	Rabobank	+ 17"

=== Stage 4 ===
15 June 2010 – Schwarzenburg to Wettingen, 192.2 km

Stage 4 Result

	Cyclist	Team	Time
1	Alessandro Petacchi (ITA)	Lampre–Farnese Vini	4h 57' 33"
2	Matti Breschel (DEN)	Team Saxo Bank	s.t.
3	Marco Marcato (ITA)	Vacansoleil	s.t.
4	José Joaquín Rojas (ESP)	Caisse d'Epargne	s.t.
5	Robbie McEwen (AUS)	Team Katusha	s.t.
6	Juan Antonio Flecha (ESP)	Team Sky	s.t.
7	Daniele Pietropolli (ITA)	Lampre–Farnese Vini	s.t.
8	Bauke Mollema (NED)	Rabobank	s.t.
9	Andreas Klöden (GER)	Team RadioShack	s.t.
10	Dries Devenyns (BEL)	Quick-Step	s.t.

General classification after Stage 4

	Rider	Team	Time
1	Tony Martin (GER)	Team HTC–Columbia	14h 35' 37"
2	Fabian Cancellara (SUI)	Team Saxo Bank	+ 1"
3	Thomas Löfkvist (SWE)	Team Sky	+ 9"
4	Rigoberto Urán (COL)	Caisse d'Epargne	+ 10"
5	Dries Devenyns (BEL)	Quick-Step	+ 11"
6	Steve Morabito (SUI)	BMC Racing Team	+ 11"
7	Fränk Schleck (LUX)	Team Saxo Bank	+ 13"
8	Jakob Fuglsang (DEN)	Team Saxo Bank	+ 14"
9	Jonathan Castroviejo (ESP)	Euskaltel–Euskadi	+ 15"
10	Bauke Mollema (NED)	Rabobank	+ 17"

=== Stage 5 ===
16 June 2010 – Wettingen to Frutigen, 172.5 km

Stage 5 Result

	Cyclist	Team	Time
1	Marcus Burghardt (GER)	BMC Racing Team	4h 21' 23"
2	Martijn Maaskant (NED)	Garmin–Transitions	+ 2"
3	Daniel Oss (ITA)	Liquigas–Doimo	+ 4"
4	Robbie McEwen (AUS)	Team Katusha	+ 47"
5	Diego Ulissi (ITA)	Lampre–Farnese Vini	+ 47"
6	Marco Marcato (ITA)	Vacansoleil	+ 47"
7	Carlos Barredo (ESP)	Quick-Step	+ 47"
8	Johannes Fröhlinger (GER)	Team Milram	+ 47"
9	José Joaquín Rojas (ESP)	Caisse d'Epargne	+ 47"
10	Simon Gerrans (AUS)	Team Sky	+ 47"

General classification after Stage 5

	Rider	Team	Time
1	Tony Martin (GER)	Team HTC–Columbia	18h 57' 47"
2	Fabian Cancellara (SUI)	Team Saxo Bank	+ 1"
3	Thomas Löfkvist (SWE)	Team Sky	+ 9"
4	Rigoberto Urán (COL)	Caisse d'Epargne	+ 10"
5	Dries Devenyns (BEL)	Quick-Step	+ 11"
6	Steve Morabito (SUI)	BMC Racing Team	+ 11"
7	Fränk Schleck (LUX)	Team Saxo Bank	+ 13"
8	Jakob Fuglsang (DEN)	Team Saxo Bank	+ 14"
9	Jonathan Castroviejo (ESP)	Euskaltel–Euskadi	+ 15"
10	Bauke Mollema (NED)	Rabobank	+ 17"

=== Stage 6 ===
17 June 2010 – Meiringen to La Punt, 213.3 km

Stage 6 Result

	Cyclist	Team	Time
1	Robert Gesink (NED)	Rabobank	6h 20' 53"
2	Rigoberto Urán (COL)	Caisse d'Epargne	+ 42"
3	Joaquim Rodríguez (ESP)	Team Katusha	+ 42"
4	Oliver Zaugg (SUI)	Liquigas–Doimo	+ 42"
5	-	-	-
6	Matteo Carrara (ITA)	Vacansoleil	+ 42"
7	Steve Morabito (SUI)	BMC Racing Team	+ 42"
8	Fränk Schleck (LUX)	Team Saxo Bank	+ 42"
9	Roman Kreuziger (CZE)	Liquigas–Doimo	+ 42"
10	Jakob Fuglsang (DEN)	Team Saxo Bank	+ 1' 20"

General classification after Stage 6

	Rider	Team	Time
1	Robert Gesink (NED)	Rabobank	25h 18' 57"
2	Rigoberto Urán (COL)	Caisse d'Epargne	+ 29"
3	Steve Morabito (SUI)	BMC Racing Team	+ 36"
4	Fränk Schleck (LUX)	Team Saxo Bank	+ 38"
5	Joaquim Rodríguez (ESP)	Team Katusha	+ 42"
6	Matteo Carrara (ITA)	Vacansoleil	+ 54"
7	-	-	-
8	Oliver Zaugg (SUI)	Liquigas–Doimo	+ 1' 01"
9	Jakob Fuglsang (DEN)	Team Saxo Bank	+ 1' 17"
10	Thomas Löfkvist (SWE)	Team Sky	+ 1' 38"

=== Stage 7 ===
18 June 2010 – Savognin to Wetzikon, 204.1 km

Stage 7 Result

	Cyclist	Team	Time
1	Marcus Burghardt (GER)	BMC Racing Team	4h 52' 02"
2	Óscar Freire (ESP)	Rabobank	+ 1' 01"
3	Greg Van Avermaet (BEL)	Omega Pharma–Lotto	+ 1' 01"
4	Manuel Quinziato (ITA)	Liquigas–Doimo	+ 1' 01"
5	Luis León Sánchez (ESP)	Caisse d'Epargne	+ 1' 08"
6	Mathias Frank (SUI)	BMC Racing Team	+ 1' 08"
7	Juan Antonio Flecha (ESP)	Team Sky	+ 3' 24"
8	Matti Breschel (DEN)	Team Saxo Bank	+ 3' 28"
9	Michał Gołaś (POL)	Vacansoleil	+ 3' 28"
10	Jurgen Van de Walle (BEL)	Quick-Step	+ 3' 28"

General classification after Stage 7

	Rider	Team	Time
1	Robert Gesink (NED)	Rabobank	30h 15' 59"
2	Rigoberto Urán (COL)	Caisse d'Epargne	+ 29"
3	Steve Morabito (SUI)	BMC Racing Team	+ 36"
4	Fränk Schleck (LUX)	Team Saxo Bank	+ 38"
5	Joaquim Rodríguez (ESP)	Team Katusha	+ 42"
6	Matteo Carrara (ITA)	Vacansoleil	+ 54"
7	-	-	-
8	Oliver Zaugg (SUI)	Liquigas–Doimo	+ 1' 01"
9	Jakob Fuglsang (DEN)	Team Saxo Bank	+ 1' 17"
10	Thomas Löfkvist (SWE)	Team Sky	+ 1' 38"

=== Stage 8 ===
19 June 2010 – Wetzikon to Liestal, 172.4 km

Stage 8 Result

	Cyclist	Team	Time
1	Rui Costa (POR)	Caisse d'Epargne	4h 10' 32"
2	José Joaquín Rojas (ESP)	Caisse d'Epargne	+ 15"
3	Maxime Monfort (BEL)	Team HTC–Columbia	+ 19"
4	Sandy Casar (FRA)	Française des Jeux	+ 34"
5	Alessandro Vanotti (ITA)	Liquigas–Doimo	+ 34"
6	Lars Petter Nordhaug (NOR)	Team Sky	+ 34"
7	Tom Danielson (USA)	Garmin–Transitions	+ 39"
8	Daniele Pietropolli (ITA)	Lampre–Farnese Vini	+ 1' 14"
9	Thor Hushovd (NOR)	Cervélo TestTeam	+ 1' 16"
10	Robert Gesink (NED)	Rabobank	+ 1' 16"

General classification after Stage 8

	Rider	Team	Time
1	Robert Gesink (NED)	Rabobank	34h 27' 47"
2	Rigoberto Urán (COL)	Caisse d'Epargne	+ 29"
3	Steve Morabito (SUI)	BMC Racing Team	+ 36"
4	Fränk Schleck (LUX)	Team Saxo Bank	+ 38"
5	Joaquim Rodríguez (ESP)	Team Katusha	+ 42"
6	Matteo Carrara (ITA)	Vacansoleil	+ 54"
7	-	-	-
8	Oliver Zaugg (SUI)	Liquigas–Doimo	+ 1' 01"
9	Jakob Fuglsang (DEN)	Team Saxo Bank	+ 1' 17"
10	Thomas Löfkvist (SWE)	Team Sky	+ 1' 38"

=== Stage 9 ===
20 June 2010 – Liestal, 26.9 km (Individual time trial)

Stage 9 Result

	Cyclist	Team	Time
1	Tony Martin (GER)	Team HTC–Columbia	32' 21"
2	Fabian Cancellara (SUI)	Team Saxo Bank	+ 17"
3	David Zabriskie (USA)	Garmin–Transitions	+ 29"
4	Gustav Larsson (SWE)	Team Saxo Bank	+ 48"
5	Levi Leipheimer (USA)	Team RadioShack	+ 48"
6	Andreas Klöden (GER)	Team RadioShack	+ 52"
7	Jakob Fuglsang (DEN)	Team Saxo Bank	+ 52"
8	Maxime Monfort (BEL)	Team HTC–Columbia	+ 57"
9	Wouter Poels (NED)	Vacansoleil	+ 1' 02"
10	Stijn Devolder (BEL)	Quick-Step	+ 1' 07"

General classification after Stage 9

	Rider	Team	Time
1	Fränk Schleck (LUX)	Team Saxo Bank	35h 02' 00"
2	-	-	-
3	Jakob Fuglsang (DEN)	Team Saxo Bank	+ 17"
4	Steve Morabito (SUI)	BMC Racing Team	+ 23"
5	Robert Gesink (NED)	Rabobank	+ 27"
6	Tony Martin (GER)	Team HTC–Columbia	+ 27"
7	Rigoberto Urán (COL)	Caisse d'Epargne	+ 33"
8	Andreas Klöden (GER)	Team RadioShack	+ 48"
9	Joaquim Rodríguez (ESP)	Team Katusha	+ 1' 09"
10	Levi Leipheimer (USA)	Team RadioShack	+ 1' 14"

== Leadership classification ==
Stage	Winner	General classification	Mountains Classification	Points classification	Sprints Classification	Team Classification
1	Fabian Cancellara	Fabian Cancellara	no award	Fabian Cancellara	no award	Liquigas–Doimo
2	Heinrich Haussler	Fabian Cancellara	Mathias Frank	Heinrich Haussler	Matthias Russ	Liquigas–Doimo
3	Fränk Schleck	Tony Martin	Alexandre Pliuschin	Heinrich Haussler	Matthias Russ	Team Saxo Bank
4	Alessandro Petacchi	Tony Martin	Aitor Hernández	Marco Marcato	Steve Morabito	Team Saxo Bank
5	Marcus Burghardt	Tony Martin	Aitor Hernández	Marco Marcato	Javier Aramendia	Team Saxo Bank
6	Robert Gesink	Robert Gesink	Wouter Poels	Marco Marcato	Javier Aramendia	Team Saxo Bank
7	Marcus Burghardt	Robert Gesink	Mathias Frank	Marcus Burghardt	Mathias Frank	Team Saxo Bank
8	Rui Costa	Robert Gesink	Mathias Frank	Marcus Burghardt	Mathias Frank	Team Saxo Bank
9	Tony Martin	Fränk Schleck	Mathias Frank	Marcus Burghardt	Mathias Frank	Team Saxo Bank
Final		Fränk Schleck	Mathias Frank	Marcus Burghardt	Mathias Frank	Team Saxo Bank

== Final standings ==
=== General classification ===
	Rider	Team	Time
1	Fränk Schleck (LUX)	Team Saxo Bank	35h 02' 00"
2	-	-	-
3	Jakob Fuglsang (DEN)	Team Saxo Bank	+ 17"
4	Steve Morabito (SUI)	BMC Racing Team	+ 23"
5	Robert Gesink (NED)	Rabobank	+ 27"
6	Tony Martin (GER)	Team HTC–Columbia	+ 27″
7	Rigoberto Urán (COL)	Caisse d'Epargne	+ 33"
8	Andreas Klöden (GER)	Team RadioShack	+ 48"
9	Joaquim Rodríguez (ESP)	Team Katusha	+ 1' 09"
10	Levi Leipheimer (USA)	Team RadioShack	+ 1' 14"

=== Teams classification ===
#	Team	Time
1	Team Saxo Bank	105h 03' 40"
2	Team RadioShack	+ 4' 34"
3	Caisse d'Epargne	+ 16' 33"
4	Team Sky	+ 17' 05"
5	Vacansoleil	+ 18' 21"
6	Quick-Step	+ 18' 25"
7	Liquigas–Doimo	+ 18' 45"
8	Rabobank	+ 22' 37"
9	Team Katusha	+ 34' 27"
10	BMC Racing Team	+ 34' 48"

=== Points classification ===
	Rider	Team	Points
1	Marcus Burghardt (GER)	BMC Racing Team	50
2	José Joaquín Rojas (ESP)	Caisse d'Epargne	50
3	Marco Marcato (ITA)	Vacansoleil	43
4	Fabian Cancellara (SUI)	Team Saxo Bank	36
5	Tony Martin (GER)	Team HTC–Columbia	33
6	Óscar Freire (ESP)	Rabobank	33
7	Robert Gesink (NED)	Rabobank	27
8	Rui Costa (POR)	Caisse d'Epargne	25
9	Maxime Monfort (BEL)	Team HTC–Columbia	25
10	Rigoberto Urán (COL)	Caisse d'Epargne	24

=== Mountains classification ===
	Rider	Team	Points
1	Mathias Frank (SUI)	BMC Racing Team	49
2	Wouter Poels (NED)	Vacansoleil	40
3	Robert Gesink (NED)	Rabobank	21
4	Aitor Hernández (ESP)	Euskaltel–Euskadi	19
5	Marcus Burghardt (GER)	BMC Racing Team	18
6	Matteo Carrara (ITA)	Vacansoleil	15
7	Daniel Oss (ITA)	Liquigas–Doimo	13
8	Maxime Monfort (BEL)	Team HTC–Columbia	11
9	Roman Kreuziger (CZE)	Liquigas–Doimo	10
10	Amets Txurruka (ESP)	Euskaltel–Euskadi	10

=== Sprints classification ===
	Rider	Team	Points
1	Mathias Frank (SUI)	BMC Racing Team	16
2	Marcus Burghardt (GER)	BMC Racing Team	15
3	Javier Aramendia (ESP)	Euskaltel–Euskadi	12
4	Steve Morabito (SUI)	BMC Racing Team	9
5	José Joaquín Rojas (ESP)	Caisse d'Epargne	7
6	Matthias Russ (GER)	Team Milram	7
7	Juan José Oroz (ESP)	Euskaltel–Euskadi	6
8	Rui Costa (POR)	Caisse d'Epargne	6
9	Michael Albasini (SUI)	Team HTC–Columbia	6
10	Ermanno Capelli (ITA)	Footon–Servetto–Fuji	6
