= 2016 La Flèche Wallonne =

2016 UCI World Tour, race 12 of 28

Race details
- Dates: 20 April 2016
- Stages: 1
- Distance: 196 km (122 mi)
- Winning time: 4h 43' 57"

Results
	Winner	Alejandro Valverde (ESP)	(Movistar Team)
	Second	Julian Alaphilippe (FRA)	(Etixx–Quick-Step)
	Third	Dan Martin (IRE)	(Etixx–Quick-Step)

The 2016 La Flèche Wallonne (English: The Walloon Arrow) was a one-day cycling classic that took place on 20 April 2016. It was the 80th edition of La Flèche Wallonne and the twelfth race of the 2016 UCI World Tour. It was the second of the three Ardennes classics, coming after the Amstel Gold Race and before the Liège–Bastogne–Liège.

The race took place on a hilly 196-kilometre (122 mi) route that started in Marche-en-Famenne and ended in Huy. The key aspect of La Flèche Wallonne is the climb of the Mur de Huy, which was crossed three times during the race; the finishing line was at the top of the final climb of the Mur. The race typically suits both puncheurs and climbers. The defending champion was Alejandro Valverde (Movistar).

The race was decided in a group sprint on the Mur de Huy. The sprint was won by Valverde, who beat Julian Alaphilippe (Etixx–Quick-Step) into second place for the second consecutive year, with Alaphilippe's teammate Dan Martin third. It was Valverde's third consecutive win and his fourth overall, giving him the record for the most victories in the race.

== Route ==
Profile of the final 29 kilometres (18 mi), including the Côte d'Ereffe, the Côte de Cherave and the Mur de Huy

The route was slightly changed from the 2015 edition. The start moved to Marche-en-Famenne and the Côte des 36 Tournants was replaced by two climbs of the Côte de Solieres, later on in the race. The decisive final section of the race, however, remained unchanged. The race included twelve classified climbs, including three ascents of the Mur de Huy.

After beginning the race in Marche-en-Famenne, the riders travelled south, before turning north after 13 kilometres (8.1 mi) and passing through Rochefort. There was then a fairly flat 50 kilometres (31 mi) that brought the peloton to Ohey, where the riders entered a series of circuits around Huy. The first climb was the Côte de Bellaire after 67 kilometres (42 mi), followed by the Côte de Bohissau, the Côte de Solieres and the first climb of the Mur de Huy, which came with 101 kilometres (63 mi) covered and 95 kilometres (59 mi) remaining. The next circuit took the riders southeast out of Huy, across the Côte d'Ereffe, and back to Ohey. They then followed the same sequence of the Côte de Bellaire, the Côte de Bohissau, the Côte de Solieres and the Mur de Huy. The second climb of the Mur came with 29 kilometres (18 mi) remaining.

The final circuit took the riders back across the Côte d'Ereffe for the second time, but then turned north for a shorter route back into Huy. After entering the town, there was a detour to climb the Côte de Cherave. This is a 1.3-kilometre (0.81 mi) climb at an average gradient of 8.1%; the summit came with 5.5 kilometres (3.4 mi) remaining. After the descent back into Huy, the riders climbed the Mur de Huy for the third time, with the finish line coming at the top of the climb. The Mur de Huy is a 1.3-kilometre (0.81 mi) climb at an average gradient of 9.6%.

== Teams ==
The race organisers invited 25 teams to participate in the 2016 La Flèche Wallonne. As it is a UCI World Tour event, all 18 UCI WorldTeams were invited automatically and were obliged to send a squad. An additional seven UCI Professional Continental teams were given wildcard entries. These included three French teams (Cofidis, Delko–Marseille Provence KTM and Fortuneo–Vital Concept), two Belgian teams (Topsport Vlaanderen–Baloise and Wanty–Groupe Gobert), a Dutch team (Roompot–Oranje Peloton) and a German team (Stölting Service Group). Each team was entitled to enter eight riders, so the start list included 200 riders. On the morning of the race, however, the UCI opened a biological passport case against Team Sky's Sergio Henao; the team withdrew him from all racing and he did not start La Flèche Wallonne.

UCI WorldTeams

- AG2R La Mondiale
- Astana
- BMC Racing Team
- Team Dimension Data
- Etixx–Quick-Step
- FDJ
- IAM Cycling
- Lampre–Merida
- Lotto–Soudal
- Movistar Team
- Team Giant–Alpecin
- Team Katusha
- LottoNL–Jumbo
- Team Sky
- Tinkoff
- Trek–Segafredo
- Cannondale
- Orica–GreenEDGE

UCI Professional Continental teams

- Cofidis
- Delko–Marseille Provence KTM
- Fortuneo–Vital Concept
- Roompot–Oranje Peloton
- Stölting Service Group
- Topsport Vlaanderen–Baloise
- Wanty–Groupe Gobert

== Pre-race favourites ==
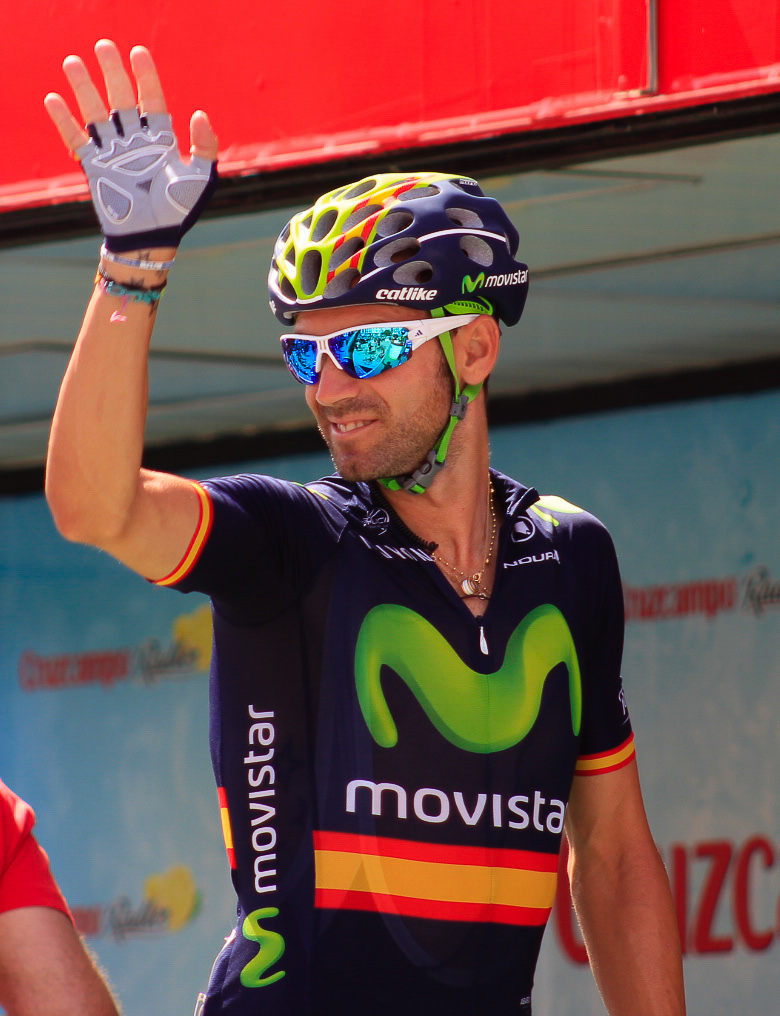
Alejandro Valverde (Movistar Team), the defending champion and pre-race favourite (photographed at the 2015 Vuelta a España)

La Flèche Wallonne is part of the Ardennes classics. These begin with the Amstel Gold Race (won in 2016 by Wanty–Groupe Gobert's Enrico Gasparotto) and end the following weekend with the Liège–Bastogne–Liège; La Flèche Wallonne comes in the middle of the week. The three races are characterised by short, steep climbs, particularly towards the end of each race and suit the puncheurs.

The defending champion and favourite for the race was Alejandro Valverde (Movistar Team). Valverde had won the race in 2006, 2014 and 2015. No rider had ever won more than three editions of La Flèche Wallonne. Valverde was in strong form following his victory at the Vuelta a Castilla y León on the previous weekend, although he was preparing particularly for the 2016 Giro d'Italia rather than for the Ardennes classics. His team included Daniel Moreno, who had won the 2013 La Flèche Wallonne.

Two other former winners of the race were on the start list in 2016. These were Philippe Gilbert (BMC Racing Team), the winner in 2011, and Joaquim Rodríguez (Team Katusha), the winner in 2012. Neither was in a strong position, however: Gilbert suffered a broken finger during an altercation in training with a driver and had struggled during the Amstel Gold Race. The BMC team manager said that Gilbert was "certainly not here as one of the favourites" and had considered skipping the race. Rodríguez, meanwhile, had abandoned the Amstel Gold Race following a bad crash.

Other riders considered potential winners were Dan Martin and Julian Alaphilippe (both Etixx–Quick-Step), Michael Albasini (Orica–GreenEDGE) and Sergio Henao (Team Sky), with the latter being unable to start.

== Result ==
Result (top 10)
Rank	Rider	Team	Time
1	Alejandro Valverde (ESP)	Movistar Team	4h 43' 57"
2	Julian Alaphilippe (FRA)	Etixx–Quick-Step	+ 0"
3	Dan Martin (IRL)	Etixx–Quick-Step	+ 0"
4	Wout Poels (NED)	Team Sky	+ 4"
5	Enrico Gasparotto (ITA)	Wanty–Groupe Gobert	+ 5"
6	Samuel Sánchez (ESP)	BMC Racing Team	+ 5"
7	Michael Albasini (SUI)	Orica–GreenEDGE	+ 5"
8	Diego Ulissi (ITA)	Lampre–Merida	+ 5"
9	Warren Barguil (FRA)	Team Giant–Alpecin	+ 5"
10	Rui Costa (POR)	Lampre–Merida	+ 5"

== Race summary ==
It took over an hour for a breakaway to form, with the peloton travelling at 45 kilometres per hour (28 mph). Eventually a ten-man group escaped, prompted by an attack from Team Dimension Data's Steve Cummings. He was followed by eight other riders: Koen Bouwman (LottoNL–Jumbo), Silvan Dillier (BMC), Vegard Stake Laengen (IAM Cycling), Kiel Reijnen (Trek–Segafredo), Matteo Bono (Lampre–Merida), Tosh Van der Sande (Lotto–Soudal), Sander Helven (Topsport Vlaanderen–Baloise) and Quentin Pacher (Delko–Marseille Provence KTM). They were then also joined by Mads Pedersen (Stölting Service Group). With a little over half the race completed, the breakaway had over three minutes' lead. Bouwman was the first rider across the finish line on the first climb of the Mur de Huy.

The peloton was led by a range of teams, including Movistar, Katusha, Orica–GreenEDGE, Astana and Etixx–Quick-Step. With 63 kilometres (39 mi) remaining, the lead had been reduced to just over two minutes. On the second climb of the Côte de Bohissau, 7 kilometres (4.3 mi) after that, Van der Sande and Bono attacked, with only Dillier and Cummings able to follow them from the breakaway. Around 15 kilometres (9.3 mi) later, on the Côte de Solières, Fränk Schleck (Trek–Segafredo) crashed in the peloton and was forced to withdraw from the race, having apparently suffered a broken collarbone. On the penultimate climb of the Mur de Huy, Dillier attacked, with Cummings following; the pair were a minute ahead of the peloton. Cummings attacked alone at the top of the climb and briefly had a 55-second lead, but the peloton was driven hard by Movistar and Katusha and he was caught with 18 kilometres (11 mi) remaining.

The next attack came on the Côte d'Ereffe from Bob Jungels (Trek–Segafredo), Georg Preidler (Team Giant–Alpecin) and Jon Izagirre (Movistar). There was briefly a seven-man chasing group that included Michael Albasini, Movistar's Giovanni Visconti, AG2R La Mondiale's Mikaël Cherel, Sky's Wout Poels and Katusha's Jurgen Van den Broeck, but this was chased down by Tinkoff and caught with 7 kilometres (4.3 mi) remaining. Preidler was dropped on the Côte de Cherave and Tim Wellens (Lotto–Soudal) attacked the peloton and came across to the two leaders. This move was chased, however, by Etixx–Quick-Step, and the group was brought back at the foot of the Mur de Huy.

On the climb, Valverde stayed at the front of the peloton. Rodríguez made a brief, unsuccessful effort to escape from the group. He was passed by Dan Martin, but Valverde followed Martin's wheel until there were 300 metres (330 yd) remaining. Valverde then attacked and, although he was followed by Alaphilippe, finished comfortably ahead of the rest of the peloton to claim his third consecutive win in La Flèche Wallonne. Alaphilippe was second and Martin third, both on the same time as Valverde. Wout Poels finished fourth, four seconds back, with Enrico Gasparotto the first of nine riders to finish in a group five seconds behind Valverde.

== Post-race analysis ==
=== Reactions ===
Valverde's performance was described as "a master class on how to race the Mur de Huy" by VeloNews, which went on to describe him as "king of the Mur". Valverde himself said that taking the record for the most wins in the race was "a real honour". He gave credit to his team – and especially to Giovanni Visconti – for driving hard just before the climb started, in order to get him into the perfect position. He said that he had been confident that, if he accelerated in the final part of the climb, he would be able to stay away to the finish line.

Alaphilippe hit his handlebars in frustration after finishing second, but afterwards said that he could "only be pleased". He said that he had initially been disappointed, but then realised that, after two second-place finishes in two years, he could win the race in a future edition. Alaphilippe noted in particular that his winter had been affected by mononucleosis, but that this had been a "blessing in disguise" as he was able to take significant time off and then work hard for the Ardennes classics. Martin, meanwhile, said that he had ridden the climb "a lot better" than he had done in previous editions and that he went into the bottom of the climb "believing [he] could win". He said that Valverde, however, was "just stronger".

=== UCI World Tour standings ===
In the season-long 2016 UCI World Tour competition, Valverde moved up from 121st place to 22nd, Alaphilippe from 48th to 21st and Martin from 21st to 10th. There were no other changes in the top ten of the riders' rankings however. The top ten of the nations' rankings was similarly unchanged, but, in the team rankings, Etixx–Quick-Step moved up from eighth to fourth, with Movistar moving from sixth to fifth.

UCI World Tour standings on 20 April 2016
Rank	Rider	Team	Points
1	Peter Sagan (SVK)	Tinkoff	329
2	Alberto Contador (ESP)	Tinkoff	280
3	Richie Porte (AUS)	BMC Racing Team	222
4	Sergio Henao (COL)	Team Sky	204
5	Sep Vanmarcke (BEL)	LottoNL–Jumbo	201
6	Nairo Quintana (COL)	Movistar Team	178
7	Fabian Cancellara (SUI)	Trek–Segafredo	166
8	Greg Van Avermaet (BEL)	BMC Racing Team	162
9	Arnaud Démare (FRA)	FDJ	137
10	Dan Martin (IRL)	Etixx–Quick-Step	126
