= 2009 Tour de Luxembourg =

Race details
- Dates: 3–7 June
- Stages: 5

Results
| | Winner | Fränk Schleck (LUX) | (Team Saxo Bank) |
| | Second | Andreas Klöden (GER) | (Astana) |
| | Third | Marco Marcato (ITA) | (Vacansoleil) |
| | Points | Matti Breschel (DEN) | (Team Saxo Bank) |
| | Mountains | Alexandre Usov (BLR) | (Cofidis) |
| | Youth | Marco Marcato (ITA) | (Vacansoleil) |
| | Team | Team Saxo Bank | |

The 2009 Tour de Luxembourg cycling race was the 69th running of the Tour de Luxembourg. It was won by Fränk Schleck from Luxembourg, the first home rider to win this race in 26 years.

== Stages ==
Key:
: Leader and eventual winner of General Classification, based on total time.
: Leader and eventual winner of climbers' classification, based on points gained on passing hilltops.
: : Leader and eventual winner of points classification, based on points given for finishing position on each mass start stage.
: Leader and eventual winner of young riders' classification, based on total time, but restricted to riders under 25 at beginning of year.

=== Prologue ===
3 June 2009 — Luxembourg - 2.7 km (ITT)

Prologue Result

| | Rider | Team | Time |
|---|---|---|---|
| 1 | Grégory Rast (SUI) | Astana | 3' 46" |
| 2 | Jonathan Hivert (FRA) | Skil–Shimano | + 2" |
| 3 | Romain Feillu (FRA) | Agritubel | + 4" |
| 4 | Assan Bazayev (KAZ) | Astana | + 5" |
| 5 | Gustav Larsson (SWE) | Team Saxo Bank | + 6" |

General Classification after Prologue

| | Rider | Team | Time |
|---|---|---|---|
| 1 | Grégory Rast (SUI) | Astana | 3' 46" |
| 2 | Jonathan Hivert (FRA) | Skil–Shimano | + 2" |
| 3 | Romain Feillu (FRA) | Agritubel | + 4" |
| 4 | Assan Bazayev (KAZ) | Astana | + 5" |
| 5 | Gustav Larsson (SWE) | Team Saxo Bank | + 6" |

=== Stage 1 ===
4 June 2009 — Luxembourg > Mondorf-les-Bains - 157 km

Stage 1 Result

| | Rider | Team | Time |
|---|---|---|---|
| 1 | Danilo Napolitano (ITA) | Team Katusha | 3h 48' 29" |
| 2 | Steven Caethoven (BEL) | Agritubel | s.t. |
| 3 | Tom Veelers (NED) | Skil–Shimano | s.t. |
| 4 | Romain Feillu (FRA) | Agritubel | s.t. |
| 5 | Tiziano Dall'antonia (ITA) | CSF Group–Navigare | s.t. |

General Classification after Stage 1

| | Rider | Team | Time |
|---|---|---|---|
| 1 | Grégory Rast (SUI) | Astana | 3h 52' 15" |
| 2 | Jonathan Hivert (FRA) | Skil–Shimano | + 2" |
| 3 | Romain Feillu (FRA) | Agritubel | + 4" |
| 4 | Assan Bazayev (KAZ) | Astana | + 5" |
| 5 | Gustav Larsson (SWE) | Team Saxo Bank | + 6" |

=== Stage 2 ===
5 June 2009 — Schifflange > Differdange - 188 km

Stage 2 Result

| | Rider | Team | Time |
|---|---|---|---|
| 1 | Andy Schleck (LUX) | Team Saxo Bank | 5h 00' 46" |
| 2 | Matti Breschel (DEN) | Team Saxo Bank | s.t. |
| 3 | Aitor Galdos Alonso (ESP) | Euskaltel–Euskadi | s.t. |
| 4 | Marco Marcato (ITA) | Vacansoleil | s.t. |
| 5 | Geoffroy Lequatre (FRA) | Agritubel | s.t. |

General Classification after Stage 2

| | Rider | Team | Time |
|---|---|---|---|
| 1 | Assan Bazayev (KAZ) | Astana | 8h 53' 06" |
| 2 | Marco Marcato (ITA) | Vacansoleil | + 3" |
| 3 | Matti Breschel (DEN) | Team Saxo Bank | + 5" |
| 4 | Aitor Galdos Alonso (ESP) | Euskaltel–Euskadi | + 6" |
| 5 | Andy Schleck (LUX) | Team Saxo Bank | + 8" |

=== Stage 3 ===
6 June 2009 — Wiltz > Diekirch - 185 km

Stage 3 Result

| | Rider | Team | Time |
|---|---|---|---|
| 1 | Fränk Schleck (LUX) | Team Saxo Bank | 4h 43' 31" |
| 2 | Andreas Klöden (GER) | Astana | + 6" |
| 3 | Matti Breschel (DEN) | Team Saxo Bank | + 1' 39" |
| 4 | Marco Marcato (ITA) | Vacansoleil | s.t. |
| 5 | Gustav Larsson (SWE) | Team Saxo Bank | s.t. |

General Classification after Stage 3

| | Rider | Team | Time |
|---|---|---|---|
| 1 | Fränk Schleck (LUX) | Team Saxo Bank | 13h 36' 47" |
| 2 | Andreas Klöden (GER) | Astana | + 4" |
| 3 | Marco Marcato (ITA) | Vacansoleil | + 1' 32" |
| 4 | Matti Breschel (DEN) | Team Saxo Bank | + 1' 34" |
| 5 | Assan Bazayev (KAZ) | Astana | + 1' 53" |

=== Stage 4 ===
7 June 2009 — Mersch > Luxembourg - 148 km

Stage 4 Result

| | Rider | Team | Time |
|---|---|---|---|
| 1 | Matti Breschel (DEN) | Team Saxo Bank | 4h 15' 02" |
| 2 | Alexandre Usov (BLR) | Cofidis | s.t. |
| 3 | Marco Marcato (ITA) | Vacansoleil | s.t. |
| 4 | Geoffroy Lequatre (FRA) | Agritubel | s.t. |
| 5 | Aitor Galdos Alonso (ESP) | Euskaltel–Euskadi | s.t. |

General Classification after Stage 4

| | Rider | Team | Time |
|---|---|---|---|
| 1 | Fränk Schleck (LUX) | Team Saxo Bank | 17h 51' 49" |
| 2 | Andreas Klöden (GER) | Astana | + 10" |
| 3 | Marco Marcato (ITA) | Vacansoleil | + 1' 32" |
| 4 | Matti Breschel (DEN) | Team Saxo Bank | + 1' 34" |
| 5 | Assan Bazayev (KAZ) | Astana | + 1' 59" |

== Jersey progress ==
| Stage | Winner | General classification | Mountains classification | Points classification | Young rider classification | Team classification |
|---|---|---|---|---|---|---|
| P | Grégory Rast | Grégory Rast | | | Jonathan Hivert | Astana |
| 1 | Danilo Napolitano | Grégory Rast | Alexandre Usov | Romain Feillu | Jonathan Hivert | Astana |
| 2 | Andy Schleck | Assan Bazayev | Alexandre Usov | Romain Feillu | Marco Marcato | Astana |
| 3 | Fränk Schleck | Fränk Schleck | Alexandre Usov | Matti Breschel | Marco Marcato | Team Saxo Bank |
| 4 | Matti Breschel | Fränk Schleck | Alexandre Usov | Matti Breschel | Marco Marcato | Team Saxo Bank |
| Final | | Fränk Schleck | Alexandre Usov | Matti Breschel | Marco Marcato | Team Saxo Bank |
