= 2006 Tour of the Basque Country =

Race details
- Dates: 3–8 April 2006
- Stages: 6
- Distance: 829 km (515.1 mi)
- Winning time: 20h 31' 47"

Results
	Winner	José Ángel Gómez Marchante (ESP)	(Saunier Duval–Prodir)
	Second	Alejandro Valverde (ESP)	(Caisse d'Epargne–Illes Balears)
	Third	Antonio Colóm (ESP)	(Caisse d'Epargne–Illes Balears)

The 2006 Tour of the Basque Country was the 46th Tour of the Basque Country road cycling race and was held over six stages from 3 April to 8 April 2006. It was won by Spaniard José Ángel Gómez Marchante of the Saunier Duval–Prodir cycling team.

== Stages ==
=== Stage 1 ===
3 April 2006 – Irun to Irun, 130 km (81 mi)

Stage 1 result

	Cyclist	Country	Team	Time
1	Alejandro Valverde	Spain	Caisse d'Epargne–Illes Balears	3h 22' 27"
2	Óscar Freire	Spain	Rabobank	s.t.
3	Davide Rebellin	Italy	Gerolsteiner	s.t.
4	Miguel Ángel Martín Perdiguero	Spain	Phonak	s.t.
5	Fränk Schleck	Luxembourg	Team CSC	s.t.

General Classification after Stage 1

	Cyclist	Country	Team	Time
1	Alejandro Valverde	Spain	Caisse d'Epargne–Illes Balears	3h 22' 27"
2	Óscar Freire	Spain	Rabobank	s.t.
3	Davide Rebellin	Italy	Gerolsteiner	s.t.
4	Miguel Ángel Martín Perdiguero	Spain	Phonak	s.t.
5	Fränk Schleck	Luxembourg	Team CSC	s.t.

=== Stage 2 ===
4 April 2006 – Irun to Segura, 155 km (96 mi)

Stage 2 result

	Cyclist	Country	Team	Time
1	Samuel Sánchez	Spain	EUS	4h 10' 55"
2	Alberto Contador	Spain	LSW	s.t.
3	Alejandro Valverde	Spain	Caisse d'Epargne–Illes Balears	+ 2"
4	Patrik Sinkewitz	Germany	T-Mobile Team	+ 2"
5	Davide Rebellin	Italy	Gerolsteiner	+ 2"

General Classification after Stage 2

	Cyclist	Country	Team	Time
1	Samuel Sánchez	Spain	EUS	7h 33' 22"
2	Alberto Contador	Spain	LSW	s.t.
3	Alejandro Valverde	Spain	Caisse d'Epargne–Illes Balears	+ 2"
4	Davide Rebellin	Italy	Gerolsteiner	+ 2"
5	Fränk Schleck	Luxembourg	Team CSC	+ 2"

=== Stage 3 ===
5 April 2006 – Segura to Lerín, 170 km (110 mi)

Stage 3 result

	Cyclist	Country	Team	Time
1	Samuel Sánchez	Spain	EUS	4h 07' 36"
2	Davide Rebellin	Italy	Gerolsteiner	s.t.
3	Alberto Contador	Spain	LSW	s.t.
4	Leonardo Bertagnolli	Italy	Cofidis	s.t.
5	José Ángel Gómez Marchante	Spain	Saunier Duval–Prodir	s.t.

General Classification after Stage 3

	Cyclist	Country	Team	Time
1	Samuel Sánchez	Spain	EUS	11h 40' 58"
2	Alberto Contador	Spain	LSW	s.t.
3	Davide Rebellin	Italy	Gerolsteiner	+ 2"
4	Cadel Evans	Australia	Davitamon–Lotto	+ 2"
5	Leonardo Bertagnolli	Italy	Cofidis	+ 2"

=== Stage 4 ===
6 April 2005 – Lerín to Vitoria-Gasteiz, 172 km (107 mi)

Stage 4 result

	Cyclist	Country	Team	Time
1	Óscar Freire	Spain	Rabobank	3h 56' 43"
2	Samuel Sánchez	Spain	EUS	s.t.
3	Fabian Wegmann	Germany	Gerolsteiner	s.t.
4	Alejandro Valverde	Spain	Caisse d'Epargne–Illes Balears	s.t.
5	Stefano Garzelli	Italy	Liquigas	s.t.

General Classification after Stage 4

	Cyclist	Country	Team	Time
1	Samuel Sánchez	Spain	EUS	15h 37' 41"
2	Alberto Contador	Spain	LSW	s.t.
3	Davide Rebellin	Italy	Gerolsteiner	+ 2"
4	Cadel Evans	Australia	Davitamon–Lotto	+ 2"
5	Leonardo Bertagnolli	Italy	Cofidis	+ 2"

=== Stage 5 ===
7 April 2006 – Vitoria-Gasteiz to Zalla, 178 km (111 mi)

Stage 5 result

	Cyclist	Country	Team	Time
1	Thomas Voeckler	France	Bouygues Télécom	4h 18' 42"
2	Jens Voigt	Germany	Team CSC	s.t.
3	Juan José Cobo	Spain	Saunier Duval–Prodir	+ 12"
4	Gustavo César	Spain	KAI	+ 34"
5	Pietro Caucchioli	Italy	C.A	+ 34"

General Classification after Stage 5

	Cyclist	Country	Team	Time
1	Samuel Sánchez	Spain	EUS	19h 58' 54"
2	Alberto Contador	Spain	LSW	s.t.
3	Davide Rebellin	Italy	Gerolsteiner	+ 2"
4	Cadel Evans	Australia	Davitamon–Lotto	+ 2"
5	Leonardo Bertagnolli	Italy	Cofidis	+ 2"

=== Stage 6 ===
8 April 2006 – Zalla to Zalla, 24 km (15 mi) (ITT)

This stage was an individual time trial.

Stage 6 result

	Cyclist	Country	Team	Time
1	José Ángel Gómez Marchante	Spain	Saunier Duval–Prodir	32' 44"
2	Alejandro Valverde	Spain	Caisse d'Epargne–Illes Balears	+ 6"
3	Antonio Colóm	Spain	Caisse d'Epargne–Illes Balears	+ 8"
4	Evgeni Petrov	Russia	Lampre–Fondital	+ 16"
5	Patrik Sinkewitz	Germany	T-Mobile Team	+ 18"

General Classification after Stage 6

	Cyclist	Country	Team	Time
1	José Ángel Gómez Marchante	Spain	Saunier Duval–Prodir	20h 31' 47"
2	Alejandro Valverde	Spain	Caisse d'Epargne–Illes Balears	+ 7"
3	Antonio Colóm	Spain	Caisse d'Epargne–Illes Balears	+ 7"
4	Patrik Sinkewitz	Germany	T-Mobile Team	+ 19"
5	Alberto Contador	Spain	LSW	+ 20"

== Classification tables ==
General classification

	Cyclist	Country	Team	Time
1	José Ángel Gómez Marchante	Spain	Saunier Duval–Prodir	20h 31' 47"
2	Alejandro Valverde	Spain	Caisse d'Epargne–Illes Balears	+ 7"
3	Antonio Colóm	Spain	Caisse d'Epargne–Illes Balears	+ 7"
4	Patrik Sinkewitz	Germany	Lampre–Fondital	+ 19"
5	Alberto Contador	Spain	Liberty Seguros–Würth	+ 20"

King of The Mountains classification

	Cyclist	Country	Team	Points
1	Hubert Dupont	France	AG2R Prévoyance	29
2	Juan José Cobo	Spain	Saunier Duval–Prodir	25
3	José Luis Arrieta	Spain	AG2R Prévoyance	22
4	Unai Etxebarria	Venezuela	Euskaltel–Euskadi	21
5	José Ángel Gómez Marchante	Spain	Saunier Duval–Prodir	20

Points classification

	Cyclist	Country	Team	Points
1	Alejandro Valverde	Spain	Caisse d'Epargne–Illes Balears	84
2	Samuel Sánchez	Spain	Euskaltel–Euskadi	71
3	Davide Rebellin	Italy	Gerolsteiner	56
4	Óscar Freire	Spain	Rabobank	45
5	Alberto Contador	Spain	Liberty Seguros–Würth	44

Metas Volantes classification

	Cyclist	Country	Team	Points
1	Pierrick Fédrigo	France	Bouygues Télécom	11
2	José Luis Arrieta	Spain	AG2R Prévoyance	9
3	Andriy Hrivko	Ukraine	Team Milram	6
4	Rubén Lobato	Spain	Saunier Duval–Prodir	6
5	Unai Etxebarria	Venezuela	Euskaltel–Euskadi	6

Best team

	Team	Country	Time
1	Saunier Duval–Prodir	Spain	61h 36' 43"
2	Liberty Seguros–Würth	Spain	+ 3' 13"
3	T-Mobile Team	Germany	+ 3' 30"
4	Discovery Channel	United States	+ 4' 49"
5	Lampre–Fondital	Italy	+ 4' 58"
