= Alexandre Usov =

Belarusian cyclist

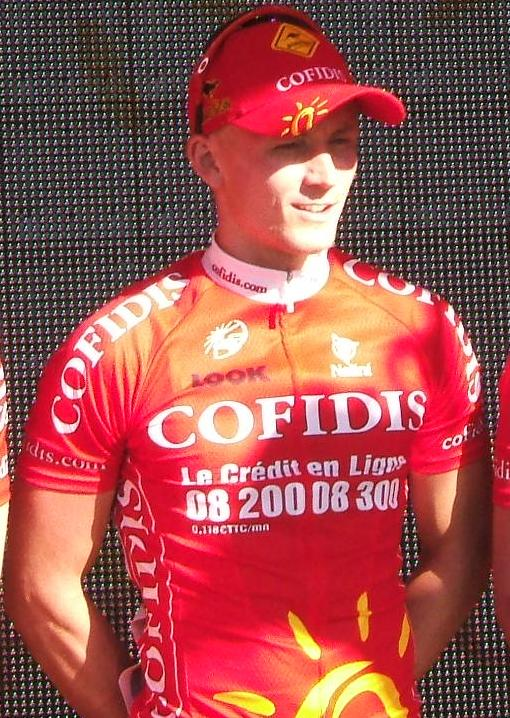
- At the 2009 Tour Down Under

Personal information
- Full name: Alexandre Usov
- Born: 27 August 1977 (age 49) Minsk, Soviet Union

Cycling career
- Sport: Cycling
- Current team: Retired
- Discipline: Road
- Role: Rider
- Rider type: Sprinter

Professional teams
- 2000–2004: Phonak
- 2005–2008: AG2R Prévoyance
- 2009: Cofidis
- 2010: ISD Continental Team

Major wins
- National Road Championship (2002)

Alexandre Usov (born 27 August 1977) is a Belarusian retired racing cyclist. His specialty is sprinting.

== Career ==
Usov came so close to victory at the 2005 GP Ouest-France with both himself and winner George Hincapie celebrating the win and unsure who won. Hincapie was awarded the win in a photo finish but years later after Hincpie admitted to doping his result was annulled so usov finished second to no one. Usov re-signing with AG2R Prévoyance for the 2007 season was only going to happen if Francisco Mancebo did not return to the team as the team could not afford them both. Mancebo was implicated in Operación Puerto doping case and was facing possible suspension. Mancebo left the team and AG2R Prévoyance signed Usov. After four top 10's in stages at the 2007 Giro d'Italia, Usov had his lead-out in the perfect position to contest the stage 18 sprint finish. The bunch went around one of the final corners too fast and Usov did not break in-time, crashing into his teammate and out of contention.

Usov went to the 2008 Giro d'Italia as the nominated sprinter for Ag2r–La Mondiale, he achieved three top 10 finishes in bunch sprints. He did however get second place in the final bunch sprint at the 2008 Vuelta a España.

== Major results ==
2000
1st Stage 10, Tour de l'Avenir
2001
1st Stages 3 & 5, Niedersachsen-Rundfahrt
1st Stage 1, Tour de l'Avenir
2002
Belarus Road Race Champion
1st Stage 2, Tour de l'Avenir
1st Stage 1, Tour du Poitou-Charentes
2003
1st Trofeo Soller
1st Trofeo Cala Millor
1st Stage 1, Clásica Internacional de Alcobendas
2004
1st Berner Rundfahrt
1st Stage 5, Volta a la Comunitat Valenciana
2005
1st Stage 4, Hessen Rundfahrt
1st Stage 1, Circuit des Ardennes
1st Stage 1, Boucles de la Mayenne
2nd GP Plouay
2007
1st Stage 4, Tour du Limousin
2008
1st Stage 7, Tour de Langkawi
2009
1st Mountains Classification, Tour de Luxembourg
