= 2007 La Flèche Wallonne =

The 71st edition of the La Flèche Wallonne cycling classic took place on April 25, 2007 and was won by the 2004 winner Davide Rebellin ahead of 2006 winner Alejandro Valverde and 2005 winner Danilo Di Luca.

== Results ==
=== 2007-04-25: Charleroi-Huy, 202 km ===
	Cyclist	Team	Time	UCI ProTour Points
1	Davide Rebellin (ITA)	Gerolsteiner	4h 48' 06"	40
2	Alejandro Valverde (ESP)	Caisse d'Epargne	+ 6"	30
3	Danilo Di Luca (ITA)	Liquigas	+ 6"	25
4	Matthias Kessler (GER)	Astana Team	+ 8"	20
5	Riccardo Riccò (ITA)	Saunier Duval–Prodir	+ 8"	15
6	Rinaldo Nocentini (ITA)	AG2R Prévoyance	+ 13"	11
7	Fränk Schleck (LUX)	Team CSC	+ 16"	7
8	John Gadret (FRA)	AG2R Prévoyance	+ 19"	5
9	Robert Gesink (NED)	Rabobank	+ 19"	3
10	Tadej Valjavec (SLO)	Lampre–Fondital	+ 19"	1

== Individual 2007 UCI ProTour standings after race ==
As of April 25, 2007, after the 2007 La Flèche Wallonne

Rank	Previous Rank	Name	Team	Points
1	1	Davide Rebellin (ITA)	Gerolsteiner	132
2	2	Óscar Freire (ESP)	Rabobank	82
3	3	Stuart O'Grady (AUS)	Team CSC	79
4	4	Stefan Schumacher (GER)	Gerolsteiner	75
5	21	Alejandro Valverde (ESP)	Caisse d'Epargne	67
6	5	Alberto Contador (ESP)	Discovery Channel	58
7	6	Juan José Cobo (ESP)	Saunier Duval–Prodir	57
8	7	Tom Boonen (BEL)	Quick-Step–Innergetic	57
9	8	Andreas Klöden (GER)	Astana Team	53
10	9	Alessandro Ballan (ITA)	Lampre–Fondital	50
11	27	Danilo Di Luca (ITA)	Liquigas	50
12	12	Tadej Valjavec (SLO)	Lampre–Fondital	46
13	10	Roger Hammond (GBR)	T-Mobile Team	45
14	11	Samuel Sánchez (ESP)	Euskaltel–Euskadi	45
15	13	Robbie McEwen (AUS)	Predictor–Lotto	44

- 82 riders have scored at least one point on the 2007 UCI ProTour.
