= Patrik Sinkewitz =

German racing cyclist (born 1980)

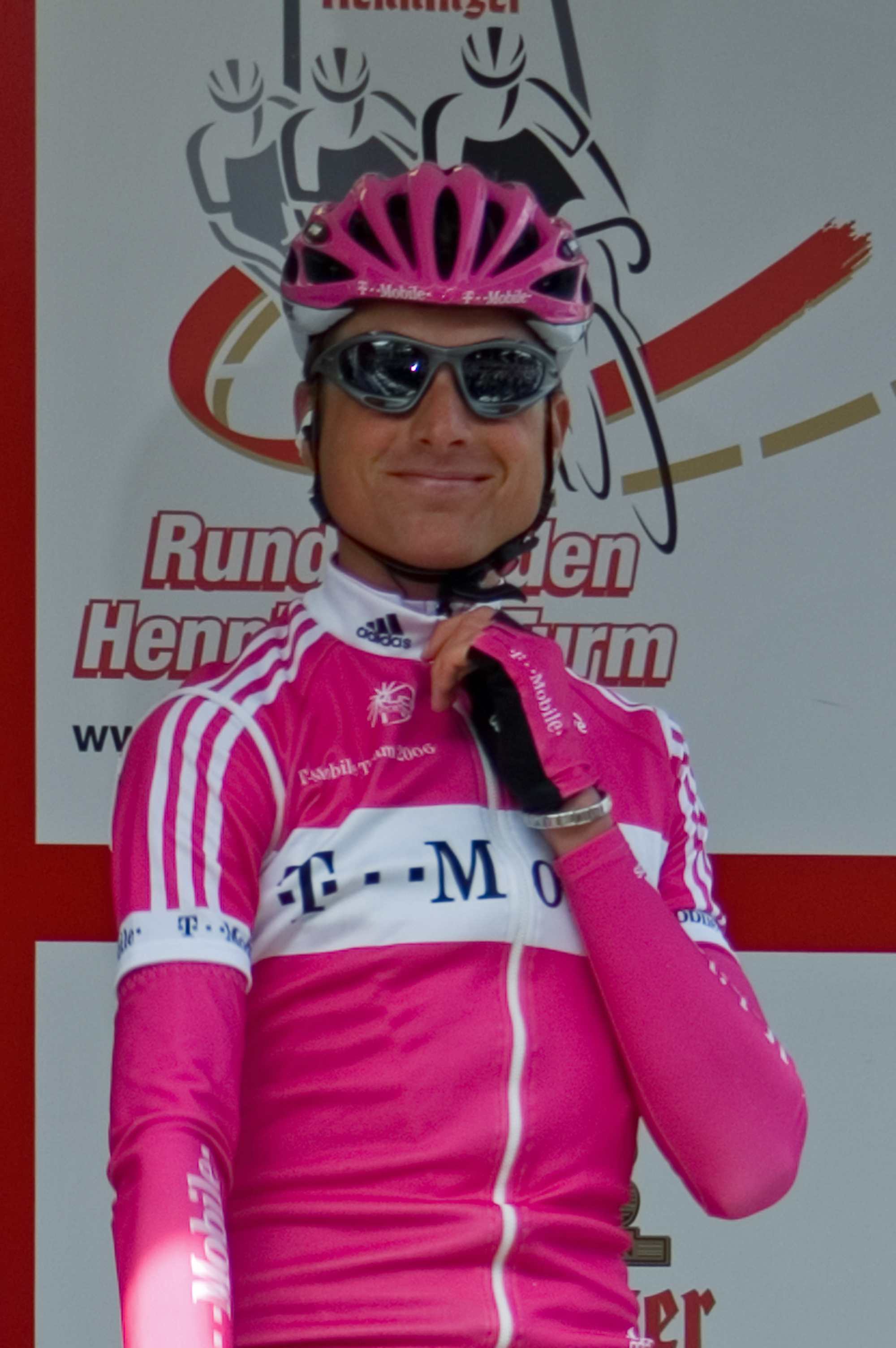
- Sinkewitz in 2006

Personal information
- Full name: Patrik Sinkewitz
- Born: 20 October 1980 (age 45) Fulda, West Germany
- Height: 1.73 m (5 ft 8 in)
- Weight: 63 kg (139 lb)

Cycling career
- Sport: Cycling
- Current team: Suspended
- Discipline: Road
- Role: Rider
- Rider type: Climbing specialist

Amateur team
- 2000: Mapei–Quick-Step (stagiaire)

Professional teams
- 2001–2002: Mapei–Quick-Step
- 2003–2005: Quick-Step–Davitamon
- 2006–2007: T-Mobile Team
- 2009: PSK Whirlpool–Author
- 2010–2011: ISD–NERI
- 2012–2014: Meridiana–Kamen

Major wins
- Deutschland Tour (2004); Rund um den Henninger Turm (2007)

Patrik Sinkewitz (born 20 October 1980) is a German professional road racing cyclist, who is currently suspended from the sport until 2024 for doping and ineligibility offences. He was a climbing specialist who can ride well over a stage race, as in winning the 2004 nine-stage Deutschland Tour. He also rode well in one-day races such as Liège–Bastogne–Liège, where he finished in the top 10 in 2006. He did not perform well in his first major tour, finishing 59th in the 2005 Tour de France. The following year he finished 23rd and had good stage results. In February 2014 he was banned from competition for 8 years for a second anti-doping rule violation, having tested positive for testosterone in 2007 and recombinant human growth hormone in 2011.

== Biography ==
Born in Fulda, Sinkewitz started his amateur career with Mapei–Quick-Step and turned professional in 2003 with Quick-Step–Davitamon. Following 2005 he moved to T-Mobile Team where he had a good early season. He came fourth in the Vuelta al País Vasco and twice finished stages in the first five. Then he finished fifth in the Amstel Gold Race, fifth in the Flèche Wallonne and fourth in Liège–Bastogne–Liège.

Sinkewitz did not start stage nine of the 2007 Tour de France after colliding with a spectator the previous day.

== Doping ==
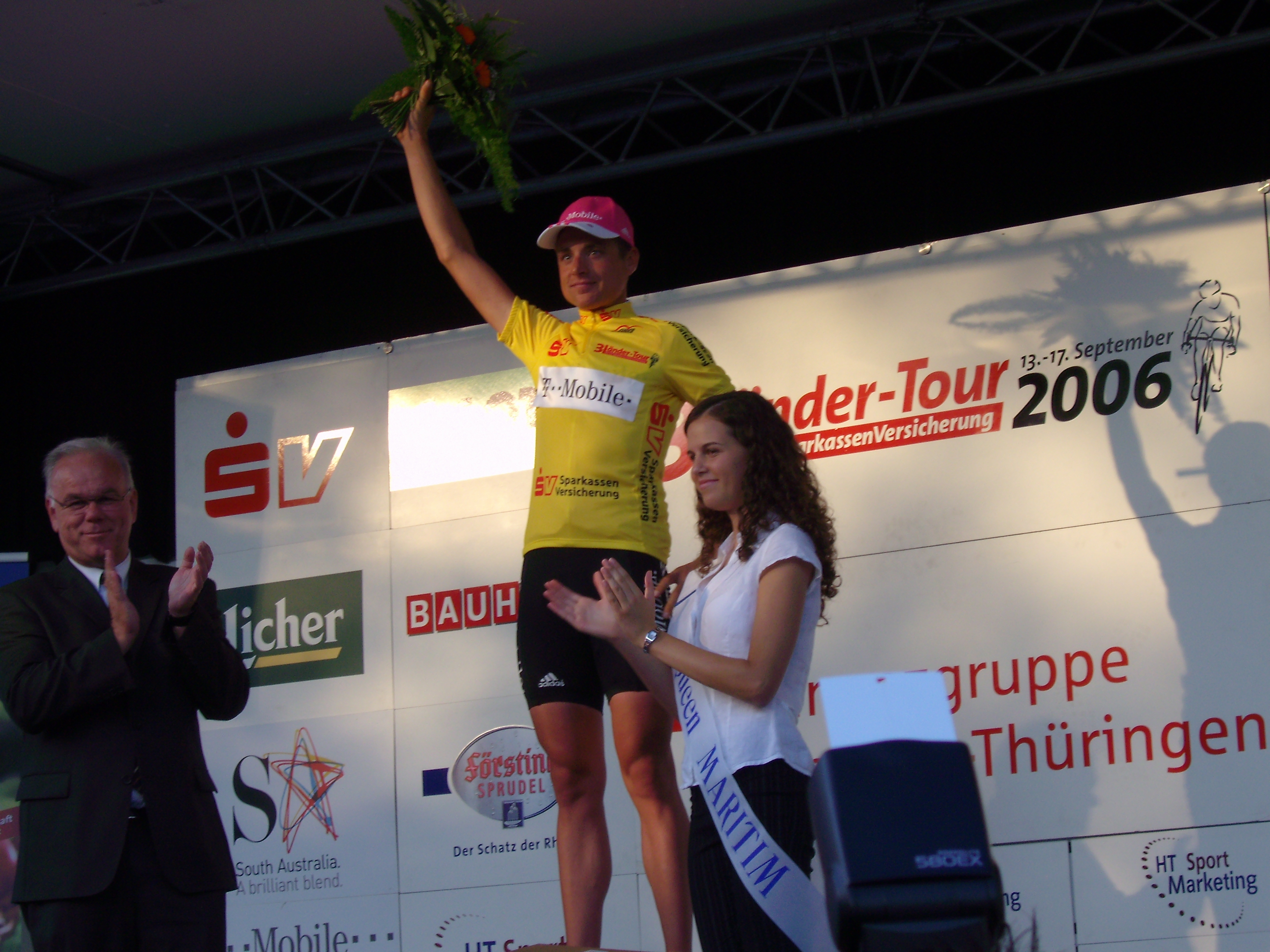
Patrik Sinkewitz receives the leader's jersey at Stage 1 of the 2006 3-Länder-Tour in Kassel.

On 18 July 2007, his blood tested positive for testosterone and he was suspended by his team. On 31 July 2007, Sinkewitz was fired by T-Mobile after he declined to have his "B" or second blood sample tested. He admitted using Testogel, a testosterone ointment. On 3 November, he admitted using EPO and blood transfusions.

Sinkewitz was banned for one year, until 17 July 2008. In 2009, Sinkewitz joined the Czech-based team PSK Whirlpool. He went on to ride for Team ISD for the 2010 and 2011 seasons.

On 18 March 2011 the Union Cycliste Internationale (UCI) announced that Sinkewitz had tested positive for recombinant Human Growth Hormone in a blood sample taken during the GP di Lugano earlier in the year. He was provisionally suspended by the UCI, and a B-sample was analysed a month later, also testing positive for HGH.

Sinkewitz appealed to the German Institution of Arbitration which ruled that the calculation of the sample analysis was "not sufficiently documented and therefore the ADRV [Anti-Doping Rule Violation] not validly proven," thus clearing Sinkewitz of the ADRV and allowing him to apply for a new license. The German anti-doping agency appealed to the Court of Arbitration for Sport (CAS), who in February 2014 found Sinkewitz "guilty of an Anti-Doping Rule Violation in the form of the presence of recombinant hGH in his body specimen", banning him for 8 years, imposing a €38,500 fine, and disqualifying all his results from the 2011 GP di Lugano. Later confirmed in the evidence of the USADA report in 2012, as well as by University of Freiburg doctors, to have done blood transfusions during the 2006 Tour de France alongside some of his teammates on the T-Mobile Team.

== Major results ==
2002
1st GP Winterthur
2004
1st Overall Deutschland Tour

1st Stage 3

1st Japan Cup
2006
2nd Overall 3-Länder-Tour

1st Stage 1

2007
1st Rund um den Henninger Turm
2009
1st Overall Sachsen-Tour

1st Stage 3

8th Overall Tour of Portugal

1st Stage 4

2010
1st Giro di Romagna
2013
1st Overall Settimana Ciclistica Lombarda

1st Points classification
1st Mountains classification
1st Stages 1 & 2

1st Mountains classification Tour de Slovaquie
2nd GP Industria & Artigianato di Larciano
3rd Overall Istrian Spring Trophy

1st Stage 2

3rd Overall Tour of Slovenia
3rd Raiffeisen Grand Prix
4th Banja Luka–Beograd II
6th Gran Premio della Costa Etruschi
2014
2nd Trofeo Laigueglia

== See also ==
- List of doping cases in cycling
