= 2006 Amstel Gold Race =

Dutch cycling race

2006 UCI ProTour

Race details
- Dates: April 16
- Stages: 1
- Distance: 253.1 km (157.3 mi)

Results
	Winner	Fränk Schleck (LUX)	(Team CSC)
	Second	Steffen Wesemann (SUI)	(Team HTC–Columbia)
	Third	Michael Boogerd (NED)	(Rabobank)

The 2006 Amstel Gold Race was the 41st edition of the Amstel Gold Race road bicycle race, held on April 16, 2006, in the Dutch province of Limburg. The race stretched 253.1 kilometres with start in Maastricht and finish in Valkenburg.

== General standings ==
	Rider	Team	Time
1	Fränk Schleck (LUX)	Team CSC	6h 25' 39"
2	Steffen Wesemann (SUI)	T-Mobile Team	+ 22"
3	Michael Boogerd (NED)	Rabobank	+ 46"
4	Karsten Kroon (NED)	Team CSC	+ 48"
5	Patrik Sinkewitz (GER)	T-Mobile Team	+ 48"
6	Davide Rebellin (ITA)	Team Gerolsteiner	+ 48"
7	Miguel Ángel Martín Perdiguero (ESP)	Phonak Hearing Systems	+ 48"
8	Paolo Bettini (ITA)	Quick Step-Innergetic	+ 53"
9	Stefan Schumacher (GER)	Gerolsteiner	+ 57"
10	Sergei Ivanov (RUS)	T-Mobile Team	+ 1' 07"
