= 2007 Liège–Bastogne–Liège =

Cycle race

The 2007 Liège–Bastogne–Liège road bicycle race monument was held on April 29. The race was run in the Belgian region of Wallonia. The race is organised by Amaury Sport Organisation and the Royal Pesant Club Liégeois according to the rules of the Union Cycliste Internationale (UCI) and the Royal Belgian Cycling League

== Final standings - 2007-04-29: Liège–Ans, 262 km ==
=== General classification ===
	Cyclist	Team	Time	UCI ProTour Points
1	Danilo Di Luca (ITA)	Liquigas	6h 37' 24"	50
2	Alejandro Valverde (ESP)	Caisse d'Epargne	+ 3"	40
3	Fränk Schleck (LUX)	Team CSC	+ 3"	35
4	Paolo Bettini (ITA)	Quick-Step–Innergetic	+ 6"	30
5	Davide Rebellin (ITA)	Gerolsteiner	+ 6"	25
6	Michael Boogerd (NED)	Rabobank	+ 7"	20
7	Damiano Cunego (ITA)	Lampre–Fondital	+ 9"	15
8	Matthias Kessler (GER)	Astana	+ 9"	10
9	Juan José Cobo (ESP)	Saunier Duval–Prodir	+ 9"	5
10	Kim Kirchen (LUX)	T-Mobile Team	+ 9"	2

=== Climbs classification ===
In addition to the overall title for general classification, the race includes 12 uphill sections. Points awarded for these uphill sections are 4, 2 and 1 points for the 1st, 2nd, and 3rd placed riders, respectively. The rider must finish the race for the points to be awarded. If a points tie exists between riders, then the best rider in the general classification is awarded the higher placing.

	Cyclist	Team	Points
1	Rémy Di Gregorio (FRA)	Française des Jeux	24 pts.
2	Vasil Kiryienka (BLR)	Tinkoff Credit Systems	20 pts.
3	Unai Etxebarria (VEN)	Euskaltel–Euskadi	14 pts.

== Individual 2007 UCI ProTour standings after race ==
As of April 29, 2007, after the Liège-Bastogne-Liège

Race winner, Danilo Di Luca, moved up from 11th place to 3rd place, while podium finishers, Alejandro Valverde, moved into second place behind UCI ProTour jersey wearer, Davide Rebellin. The 3rd place podium finisher, Fränk Schleck, jumped from 29th place to 7th in the overall standings.

Rank	Previous Rank	Name	Team	Points
1	1	Davide Rebellin (ITA)	Gerolsteiner	157
2	5	Alejandro Valverde (ESP)	Caisse d'Epargne	107
3	11	Danilo Di Luca (ITA)	Liquigas	100
4	2	Óscar Freire (ESP)	Rabobank	82
5	3	Stuart O'Grady (AUS)	Team CSC	79
6	4	Stefan Schumacher (GER)	Gerolsteiner	75
7	29	Fränk Schleck (LUX)	Team CSC	63
8	7	Juan José Cobo (ESP)	Saunier Duval–Prodir	62
9	6	Alberto Contador (ESP)	Discovery Channel	58
10	8	Tom Boonen (BEL)	Quick-Step–Innergetic	57
11	9	Andreas Klöden (GER)	Astana	53
12	10	Alessandro Ballan (ITA)	Lampre–Fondital	50
13	21	Matthias Kessler (GER)	Astana	50
14	12	Tadej Valjavec (SLO)	Lampre–Fondital	46
15	13	Roger Hammond (GBR)	T-Mobile Team	45

- 82 riders have scored at least one point on the 2007 UCI ProTour.
