= 2008 Liège–Bastogne–Liège =

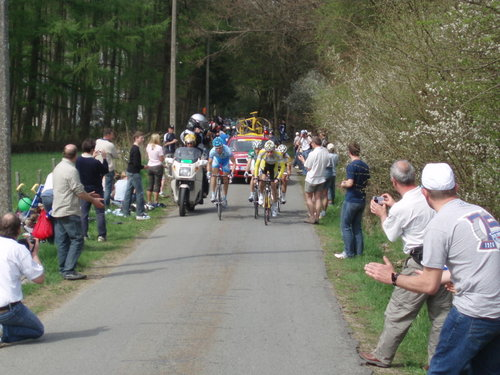

Race details
- Dates: 27 April
- Stages: 1
- Distance: 261 km (162 mi)
- Winning time: 6h 44' 04"

Results
	Winner	Alejandro Valverde (ESP)	(Caisse d'Epargne)
	Second	Davide Rebellin (ITA)	(Gerolsteiner)
	Third	Fränk Schleck (LUX)	(Team CSC)

The 2008 Liège–Bastogne–Liège monument classic cycling race took place on 27 April 2008 and was won by Spaniard Alejandro Valverde of Caisse d'Epargne, beating Italian Davide Rebellin of Gerolsteiner and Luxembourger Fränk Schleck of Team CSC in a sprint finish. It was the 94th running of the Liège–Bastogne–Liège, organised by Amaury Sport Organisation and the Royal Pesant Club Liégeois.

== Results ==
	Cyclist	Team	Time
1	Alejandro Valverde (ESP)	Caisse d'Epargne	6h 44' 04"
2	Davide Rebellin (ITA)	Gerolsteiner	s.t.
3	Fränk Schleck (LUX)	Team CSC	s.t.
4	Andy Schleck (LUX)	Team CSC	+ 30"
5	Christian Pfannberger (AUT)	Barloworld	+ 40"
6	~~Thomas Dekker (NED)~~	~~Rabobank~~	s.t.
7	Cadel Evans (AUS)	Silence–Lotto	s.t.
8	Joaquim Rodríguez (ESP)	Caisse d'Epargne	+ 48"
9	Paolo Bettini (ITA)	Quick-Step	+ 1' 03"
10	Vincenzo Nibali (ITA)	Liquigas	s.t.
