= 2006 Liège–Bastogne–Liège =

Belgian cycle race

The 92nd edition of the Liège–Bastogne–Liège cycling classic was held on 23 April 2006, and stretched 262 km. The race was won by Spanish all-rounder Alejandro Valverde of the Illes Balears cycling team.

== Results ==
	Cyclist	Team	Time
1	Alejandro Valverde (ESP)	Caisse d'Epargne–Illes Balears	6h 21' 32"
2	Paolo Bettini (ITA)	Quick-Step–Innergetic	s.t.
3	Damiano Cunego (ITA)	Lampre–Fondital	s.t.
4	Patrik Sinkewitz (GER)	T-Mobile Team	s.t.
5	Michael Boogerd (NED)	Rabobank	s.t.
6	Miguel Ángel Martín Perdiguero (ESP)	Phonak	s.t.
7	Fränk Schleck (LUX)	Team CSC	s.t.
8	Chris Horner (USA)	Davitamon–Lotto	s.t.
9	Danilo Di Luca (ITA)	Liquigas	s.t.
10	Ivan Basso (ITA)	Team CSC	s.t.
