= 2006 La Flèche Wallonne =

The 70th edition of the La Flèche Wallonne cycling classic was held on 19 April 2006. It was won by Spanish all-rounder Alejandro Valverde of Caisse d'Epargne–Illes Balears cycling team in a sprint finish. He was later convicted of doping and banned for two years.

== Results ==
=== 19-04-2006: Charleroi-Huy, 202 km. ===
	Cyclist	Team	Time
1	Alejandro Valverde (ESP)	Caisse d'Epargne–Illes Balears	4h 42' 45"
2	Samuel Sánchez (ESP)	Euskaltel–Euskadi	s.t.
3	Karsten Kroon (NED)	Team CSC	s.t.
4	Fränk Schleck (LUX)	Team CSC	s.t.
5	Patrik Sinkewitz (GER)	T-Mobile Team	+ 3"
6	Danilo Di Luca (ITA)	Liquigas	+ 5"
7	David Etxebarria (ESP)	Liberty Seguros–Würth	+ 7"
8	Koldo Gil (ESP)	Saunier Duval–Prodir	+ 10"
9	Serguei Ivanov (RUS)	T-Mobile Team	+ 12"
10	Matthias Kessler (GER)	T-Mobile Team	+ 14"
