= Jonathan Cantwell =

Australian cyclist (1982–2018)

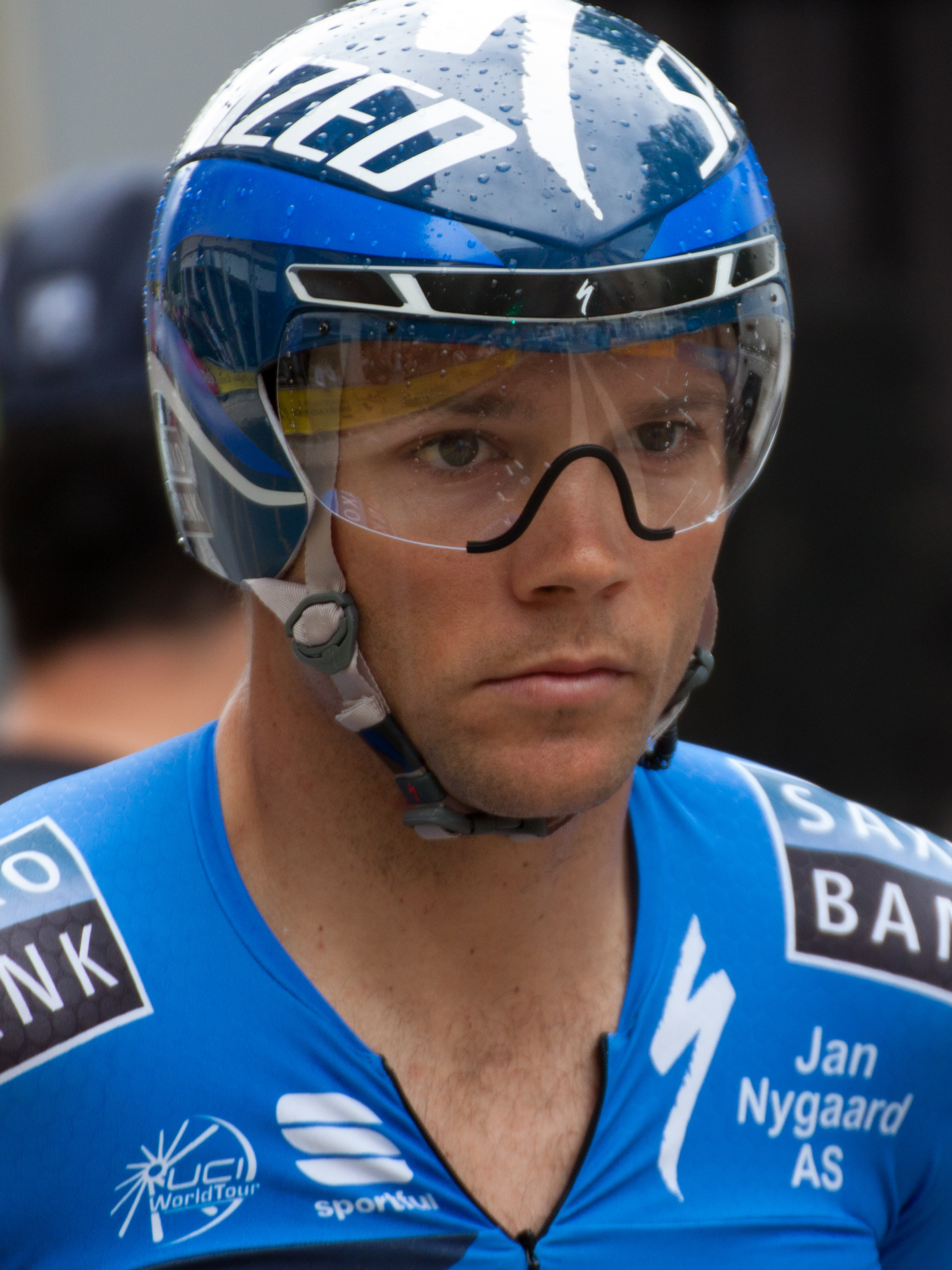
- Cantwell at the 2012 Critérium du Dauphiné

Personal information
- Full name: Jonathan Cantwell
- Nickname: Jonny
- Born: 8 January 1982
- Died: 7 November 2018 (aged 36)
- Height: 1.75 m (5 ft 9 in)
- Weight: 69 kg (152 lb)

Cycling career
- Sport: Cycling
- Discipline: Road
- Role: Rider
- Rider type: Sprinter; Lead-out man

Amateur teams
- 2004–2005: Permac Brisot Bibanese
- 2007: Kahala La Grange
- 2015: Swift Carbon Melbourne Cycling League

Professional teams
- 2008: Jittery Joe's
- 2009–2011: Fly V Australia
- 2012–2013: Team Saxo Bank
- 2014: Drapac Professional Cycling

Jonathan Cantwell (8 January 1982 – 6 November 2018) was an Australian professional road bicycle racer, who rode professionally between 2008 and 2014 for the Jittery Joe's, V Australia, Saxo–Tinkoff and Drapac Professional Cycling teams.

During his career, Cantwell won a stage of the Herald Sun Tour, and two stages of the Tour de Taiwan. In 2011, he won the Australian National Criterium Championships.

== Career ==
Cantwell joined Team Saxo Bank for the 2012 season. Cantwell made his Grand Tour début at the 2012 Tour de France, where he was earmarked as a lead-out man for the team's sprinter, Juan José Haedo; Cantwell took his first top ten placing on stage 4, when he finished sixth on the stage. He finished 137th overall in the Tour.

Cantwell left Saxo–Tinkoff at the end of the 2013 season, and joined Drapac Professional Cycling for the 2014 season.

At the end of the 2014 season, Cantwell retired from professional cycling, in order to take up duathlon and triathlon. He competed at the 2017 ITU World Triathlon Series.

== Illness and death ==
In 2017, Cantwell revealed that he had undergone an operation for testicular cancer. He died on 7 November 2018 at the age of 36; the cause was suicide (mental illness-related suicide had also claimed the lives of his father and brother). Cantwell had two children.

== Major results ==
2007
Tour of Virginia

1st Stages 4 & 5

3rd Overall International Cycling Classic
2008
1st Overall Tour of Murrieta

1st Stage 1

1st Overall International Cycling Classic
2009
1st Overall Tour of the Murray River

1st Stages 1, 3 & 7

1st Overall Tour of Atlanta

1st Stages 1, 2 & 3

Tour of Tasmania

1st Stages 1, 3 & 10

1st Stage 3 Tour of Elk Grove
1st Stage 3 San Dimas Stage Race
2nd Overall Tour of Murrieta

1st Stage 2

2nd Overall Tulsa Tough
2nd Goulburn–Sydney
3rd Overall Herald Sun Tour

1st Stage 6

3rd Overall International Cycling Classic

1st Stage 17

5th Overall Tour of Geelong

1st Stage 1

2010
1st Overall International Cycling Classic

1st Stages 7, 10, 12, 15, 16 & 17

1st Overall Tour of Elk Grove

1st Stages 2 & 3

1st Goulburn to Sydney Classic
1st Stage 3 Joe Martin Stage Race
2nd Overall USA Cycling National Racing Calendar
2nd Overall Tour of Murrieta

1st Stage 2

2nd Overall Tulsa Tough
3rd Overall 2009–10 UCI Oceania Tour
9th Tour of the Battenkill
2011
1st National Criterium Championships
Tour of the Murray River

1st Stages 1, 9 & 10

3rd Overall Tulsa Tough

1st Stage 1

4th Overall USA Cycling National Racing Calendar
5th Overall Tour of America's Dairyland

1st Stage 5

10th Overall Tour of Elk Grove
2012
Tour de Taiwan

1st Stages 4 & 7

5th Grand Prix de Fourmies
7th Trofeo Migjorn
8th Overall World Ports Classic
2013
2nd Overall World Ports Classic
4th Kampioenschap van Vlaanderen
2014
6th Overall Herald Sun Tour
2015
10th Overall Bay Classic Series
