= 2009 Jayco Herald Sun Tour =

2009–2010 UCI Oceania Tour

Race details
- Dates: 11 October – 17 October
- Stages: 6
- Distance: 664 km (412.6 mi)
- Winning time: 15h 51' 27"

Results
| | Winner | Bradley Wiggins (GBR) | (Garmin-Slipstream) |
| | Second | Chris Sutton (AUS) | (Garmin-Slipstream) |
| | Third | Jonathan Cantwell (AUS) | (Fly V Australia) |
| | Mountains | Tom Peterson (USA) | (Garmin-Slipstream) |
| | Youth | Nick Aitken (AUS) | (Jayco Australia) |
| | Sprints | Jonathan Cantwell (AUS) | (Fly V Australia) |
| | Team | (United States) Garmin-Slipstream | |

The 2009 Jayco Herald Sun Tour was the 58th edition of the Herald Sun Tour, a six-stage bicycle race held from 11–17 October 2009 in Victoria, Australia. The race was won by Bradley Wiggins, ahead of Chris Sutton and Jonathan Cantwell.
