= 2014 World Ports Classic =

2014 UCI Europe Tour

Race details
- Dates: 24–25 May
- Stages: 2
- Distance: 355.5 km (220.9 mi)
- Winning time: 8h 08' 00"

Results
Jersey awarded to the overall winner	Winner	Theo Bos (NED)	(Belkin Pro Cycling)
	Second	Ramon Sinkeldam (NED)	(Giant–Shimano)
	Third	Alexander Porsev (RUS)	(Team Katusha)
Jersey awarded to the points classification winner	Points	Theo Bos (NED)	(Belkin Pro Cycling)
Jersey awarded to the youth classification winner	Youth	Ramon Sinkeldam (NED)	(Giant–Shimano)
	Team	Wanty–Groupe Gobert	

The 2014 World Ports Classic was the third edition of the two-day World Ports Classic cycle race between the port cities of Rotterdam in the Netherlands and Antwerp in Belgium. The race was held as part of the 2014 UCI Europe Tour. In contrary to the previous two editions, the race was no longer scheduled near the end of August, but rather in the month of May; the race was held over 24–25 May 2014.

== Race overview ==
Stage	Route	Distance	Date	Winner
1	Rotterdam to Antwerp	195 km (121.2 mi)	24 May	André Greipel (GER)
2	Antwerp to Rotterdam	160.5 km (99.7 mi)	25 May	Ramon Sinkeldam (NED)

== Participating teams ==
- Ag2r–La Mondiale
- Astana
- Belkin Pro Cycling
- Bretagne–Séché Environnement
- Cofidis
- Cyclingteam de Rijke
- Giant–Shimano
- IAM Cycling
- Team Katusha
- Lotto–Belisol
- Metec-TKH Cycling Team
- MTN–Qhubeka
- Neri Sottoli
- NetApp–Endura
- Omega Pharma–Quick-Step
- Topsport Vlaanderen–Baloise
- Wallonie-Bruxelles
- Wanty–Groupe Gobert

== Stages ==
=== Stage 1 ===
24 May 2014 – Rotterdam to Antwerp, 195 km (121.2 mi)

Stage 1 Result

	Rider	Team	Time
1	André Greipel (GER)	Lotto–Belisol	4h 41' 11"
2	Alexander Porsev (RUS)	Team Katusha	s.t.
3	Theo Bos (NED)	Belkin Pro Cycling	s.t.
4	Danilo Napolitano (ITA)	Wanty–Groupe Gobert	s.t.
5	Louis Verhelst (BEL)	Cofidis	s.t.
6	Nikolas Maes (BEL)	Omega Pharma–Quick-Step	s.t.
7	Francesco Chicchi (ITA)	Neri Sottoli	s.t.
8	Ruslan Tleubayev (KAZ)	Astana	s.t.
9	Blaž Jarc (SLO)	NetApp–Endura	s.t.
10	Robin Stenuit (BEL)	Wallonie-Bruxelles	s.t.

General Classification after Stage 1

	Rider	Team	Time
1	André Greipel (GER)	Lotto–Belisol	4h 41' 01"
2	Alexander Porsev (RUS)	Team Katusha	+ 4"
3	Theo Bos (NED)	Belkin Pro Cycling	+ 6"
4	Ramon Sinkeldam (NED)	Giant–Shimano	+ 7"
5	Andreas Stauff (GER)	MTN–Qhubeka	+ 7"
6	Jesper Asselman (NED)	Metec-TKH Cycling Team	+ 8"
7	Ronan van Zandbeek (NED)	Cyclingteam de Rijke	+ 8"
8	Matthias Brändle (AUT)	IAM Cycling	+ 9"
9	Dries Hollanders (BEL)	Metec-TKH Cycling Team	+ 9"
10	Danilo Napolitano (ITA)	Wanty–Groupe Gobert	+ 10"

=== Stage 2 ===
25 May 2014 – Antwerp to Rotterdam, 160.5 km (99.7 mi)

Stage 2 Result

	Rider	Team	Time
1	Ramon Sinkeldam (NED)	Giant–Shimano	3h 27' 02"
2	Theo Bos (NED)	Belkin Pro Cycling	s.t.
3	Greg Henderson (NZL)	Lotto–Belisol	s.t.
4	Louis Verhelst (BEL)	Cofidis	s.t.
5	Sam Bennett (IRL)	NetApp–Endura	s.t.
6	Michael Van Staeyen (BEL)	Topsport Vlaanderen–Baloise	s.t.
7	Romain Feillu (FRA)	Bretagne–Séché Environnement	s.t.
8	Roy Jans (BEL)	Wanty–Groupe Gobert	s.t.
9	Matteo Pelucchi (ITA)	IAM Cycling	s.t.
10	Remco te Brake (NED)	Metec-TKH Cycling Team	s.t.

Final General Classification

	Rider	Team	Time
1	Theo Bos (NED)	Belkin Pro Cycling	8h 08' 00"
2	Ramon Sinkeldam (NED)	Giant–Shimano	+ 0"
3	Alexander Porsev (RUS)	Team Katusha	+ 5"
4	Greg Henderson (NZL)	Lotto–Belisol	+ 9"
5	Andreas Stauff (GER)	MTN–Qhubeka	+ 10"
6	Jesper Asselman (NED)	Metec-TKH Cycling Team	+ 11"
7	André Greipel (GER)	Lotto–Belisol	+ 12"
8	Wesley Kreder (NED)	Wanty–Groupe Gobert	+ 12"
9	Matteo Pelucchi (ITA)	IAM Cycling	+ 12"
10	Louis Verhelst (BEL)	Cofidis	+ 13"

== Classification leadership table ==
Stage	Winner	General classification	Points classification	Young rider classification	Team Classification
1	André Greipel	André Greipel	André Greipel	Ramon Sinkeldam	Giant–Shimano
2	Ramon Sinkeldam	Theo Bos	Theo Bos	Ramon Sinkeldam	Wanty–Groupe Gobert
Final		Theo Bos	Theo Bos	Ramon Sinkeldam	Wanty–Groupe Gobert
