= World Ports Classic =

Dutch and Belgian two-day road cycling race

Race details
- Date: August (2012, 2013); May (2014, 2015)
- Region: Netherlands and Belgium
- English name: World Ports Classic
- Discipline: Road
- Competition: UCI Europe Tour
- Type: Stage race
- Organiser: Amaury Sport Organisation
- Web site: www.letour.fr/world-ports-classic/

History
- First edition: 2012
- Editions: 4
- Final edition: 2015
- First winner: Tom Boonen (BEL)
- Most wins: No repeat winners
- Final winner: Kris Boeckmans (BEL)

The World Ports Classic was a European two-day cycle race held between the port cities of Rotterdam and Antwerp, organized by ASO as a 2.1 event on the UCI Europe Tour. The race was held between 2012 and 2015.

In all years except for 2013, the riders started in Rotterdam, finishing the first day in Antwerp before riding in the opposite direction on the second and final day. A leader's jersey was awarded to the winner of the first stage, to be defended on the second stage.

== History ==
The inaugural event commenced on 31 August 2012 with the first stage being won by Tom Boonen ahead of André Greipel and Alexander Kristoff. The second stage was won by Theo Bos ahead of Greipel and Boonen. Boonen won the overall classification and the points classification with Kristoff winning the youth classification.

The 2013 event, the only edition that started with the Antwerp–Rotterdam stage first, was won by Nikolas Maes of Belgium, while Bos won in 2014.

The final edition in 2015 was won by Kris Boeckmans of Belgium; Andrea Guardini won the first stage ahead of Yauheni Hutarovich and Boeckmans, while Boeckmans won the second stage ahead of Danilo Napolitano and Alessandro Bazzana.

== Winners ==
Year	Country	Rider	Team
2012	Belgium	Tom Boonen	Omega Pharma–Quick-Step
2013	Belgium	Nikolas Maes	Omega Pharma–Quick-Step
2014	Netherlands	Theo Bos	Belkin Pro Cycling
2015	Belgium	Kris Boeckmans	Lotto–Soudal
