= 2007 USA Cycling National Racing Calendar =

Bicycle road racing event series

The 2007 USA Cycling National Racing Calendar is a series of men's and women's road bicycle racing events held between March 3 and September 16. The USA Cycling NRC consists of numerous one-day races, including criteriums, and multi-day stage races.

== Final USA Cycling NRC standings ==
=== Individual standings ===
1. Rory Sutherland (AUS) (Health Net–Maxxis) - 1,355 points
2. Ben Jacques-Maynes (USA) (Priority Health–Bissell) - 1,326 points
3. Chris Baldwin (USA) (Toyota–United) - 1,226 points
4. Karl Menzies (AUS) (Health Net–Maxxis) - 1,149 points
5. Nathan O'Neill (AUS) (Health Net–Maxxis) - 1,008 points

=== Team standings ===
1. Health Net–Maxxis 4,432
2. Toyota–United 4,114
3. Navigators Insurance 2,088
4. Priority Health–Bissell 2,040
5. Jelly Belly Cycling Team 1,232

== Racing calendar and results ==
| Dates | USCF Ranking | Race Name | Location | Men's Winner | Women's Winner |
|---|---|---|---|---|---|
| March 3 | 1.4 | Merco Credit Union - Grand Prix presented by McLane Pacific | Merced, CA | | |
| March 4 | 1.4 | Merco Credit Union - Road Race presented by McLane Pacific | Merced, CA | | |
| March 9 | 2.4 | Central Valley Classic | Belmont, CA | | |
| March 17 | 1.4 | Quad Knopf Sequoia Cycling Classic: Individual Time Trial | Visalia, CA | | |
| March 18 | 1.4 | Quad Knopf Sequoia Cycling Classic: Criterium | Visalia, CA | | |
| March 22–25 | 2.2 | Redlands Bicycle Classic | Redlands, CA | | |
| April 1 | 1.4 | Garrett Lemire Memorial Grand Prix | Ojai, CA | (Cuba) Ivan Dominguez (Toyota–United) | (United States) Laura Van Gilder (Cheerwine) |
| April 14 | 1.3 | Sea Otter Classic | Monterey, CA | | |
| April 14 | 1.4 | Jacksonville Cycling Classic | Jacksonville, FL | (Canada) Dominique Rollin (KodakGallery.com- Sierra Nevada Brewing Co.) | (United States) Kelly Benjamin (Cheerwine) |
| April 24–29 | 2.4 | Tour of Virginia | Virginia | (Colombia) Javier Zapata (Caico) | |
| April 28-May 6 | 2.6.1 | USA Crits Southeast Series | Georgia | Race 1: (United States) Mark Hekman (Abercrombie & Fitch) | (United States) Katherine Carroll (Aaron’s Corporate Furnishings) |
| May 2–6 | 2.3 | Tour of the Gila | Silver City, NM | (United States) Nathan O'Neill (Health Net–Maxxis) | (United States) Mara Abbott (Webcor Builders) |
| May 11–13 | 2.2 | Joe Martin Stage Race | Fayetteville, AR | Rory Sutherland (Health Net–Maxxis) | (United States) Katherine Carroll (Aaron’s Corporate Furnishings) |
| May 17–20 | 2.3 | Tri-peaks Challenge | Russellville, AR | (United States) Andrew Bajadali | (United States) Amber Rais (Webcor Builders) |
| May 19–20 | 2.4 | Tour of Connecticut | Connecticut | cancelled | cancelled |
| May 25 | 1.5 | Raleigh Criterium | Raleigh, North Carolina | (Cuba) Frank Travieso (AEG-Toshiba-JetNetwork) | (United States) Laura Van Gilder (Cheerwine) |
| May 26 | 1.4 | BikeJam / Kelly Cup | Baltimore, MD | Nathan O'Neill (Navigators Insurance) | (United States) Laura Van Gilder (Cheerwine) |
| May 28 | 1.4 | Tour of Somerville | Somerville, NJ | | |
| May 29- June 3 | 2.2 | Mt. Hood Cycling Classic | Hood River, OR | (Australia) Nathan O'Neill (Health Net–Maxxis) | (Canada) Leah Goldstein (Symmetrics) |
| June 2 | 1.3 | CSC Invitational | Arlington, VA | (United States) Rahsaan Bahati (Rock Racing) | (United States) Laura Van Gilder (Cheerwine) |
| June 2 | 1.3 | Liberty Classic | Philadelphia, PA | N/A | (Germany) Ina-Yoko Teutenberg (T-Mobile Women) |
| June 13–16 | 2.2 | Tour de Nez | Reno, NV | | N/A |
| June 16 | 1.4 | Crystal City Classic | Arlington, VA | | N/A |
| June 20–24 | 2.1 | Nature Valley Grand Prix | Minnesota | (Serbia) Ivan Stevic (Toyota–United) | (United States) Kristin Armstrong (Team Lipton) |
| June 23 | 1.3 | Saturn Rochester Twilight Criterium | Rochester, NY | (Australia) Hilton Clarke (Navigators Insurance) | (United States) Jesse Maclean (Verducci Breakaway Racing) |
| July 1 | 1.3 | Chevron Manhattan Beach Grand Prix | Manhattan Beach, CA | (United States) Rahsaan Bahati (Rock Racing) | (United States) Laura Van Gilder (Cheerwine) |
| July 7 | 1.5 | Infineon Technologies Cougar Mountain Classic - Criterium | Sonoma, CA | (Italy) Alessandro Bazzana (SuccessFulliving.com p/b Parkpre) | (United States) Anna Lang (Karl Strauss/SDBC) |
| July 8 | 1.5 | Infineon Technologies Cougar Mountain Classic - Circuit Race | Sonoma, CA | (Italy) Alessandro Bazzana (SuccessFulliving.com p/b Parkpre) | |
| July 11 | 1.1 | USA Cycling Individual Time Trial Championship | Greenville, S.C. | (United States) David Zabriskie (Team CSC) | |
| July 15 | 1.1 | USA Cycling Elite Road Race Championship | Greenville, S.C. | (United States) Levi Leipheimer (Discovery Channel) | |
| July 11–15 | 2.3 | Cascade Cycling Classic | Cascade, OR | (United States) Phil Zajicek (Navigators Insurance) | - |
| July 16–24 | 2.6.2 | International Cycling Classic | Wisconsin | (Mexico) Marco Rios (Kahala-LaGrange) | (United States) Kelly Benjamin (Cheerwine) |
| July 21 | 1.3 | Wells Fargo Twilight Criterium | Boise, ID | (Cuba) Ivan Dominguez (Toyota–United) | (United States) Jean Hallada (Team Tamarack Resort) |
| July 23–29 | 2.1 | International Tour de Toona | Pennsylvania (Australia) Karl Menzies (Health Net–Maxxis) | (United States) Kristin Armstrong (Team Lipton) | |
| August 4 | 1.2 | Presbyterian Healthcare Invitational Criterium | Charlotte, North Carolina | (United States) Frank Pipp (Health Net–Maxxis) | (United States) Tina Pic; Cola Vita |
| August 5 | 1.4 | Hanes Park Classic | Winston-Salem, NC | (Cuba) Ivan Dominguez (Toyota–United) | (United States) Tina Pic; Cola Vita |
| August 12 | 2.2 | Tour of Elk Grove | Elk Grove, IL | (Australia) Nathan O'Neill (Health Net–Maxxis) | |
| August 19 | 1.1 | USA Cycling Elite Criterium Championship | Downers Grove, IL | (Canada) Martin Gilbert (Kelly Benefit Strategies–Medifast) | |
| August 27 | 1.3 | Chris Thater Memorial | Binghamton, NY | (United States) Kyle Wamsley (Navigators Insurance) | (United States) Theresa Cliff-Ryan (Cheerwine) |
| Sept 3 | 1.3 | US100K Classic | Atlanta, GA | (United States) Emile Abraham (Priority Health–Bissell) | (United States) Tina Pic; Cola Vita |
| Sept 16 | 1.2 | Tour de Leelanau | Leelanau County, MI | (United States) Garrett Peltonen (Priority Health–Bissell) | (United States) Tina Pic; Cola Vita |
