= Louis Verhelst =

Belgian cyclist

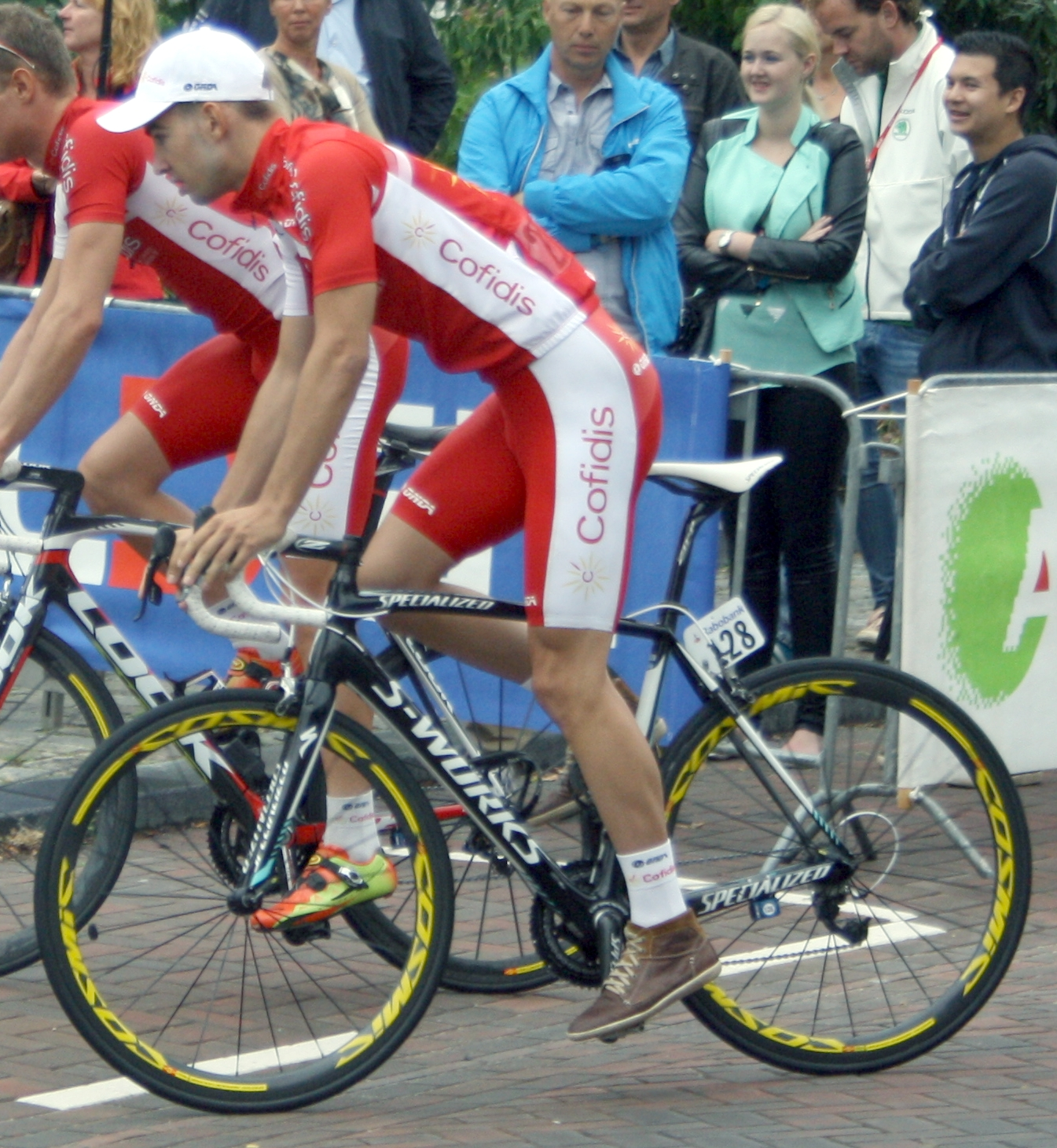
- Verhelst at the 2013 World Ports Classic.

Personal information
- Full name: Louis Verhelst
- Born: 28 August 1990 (age 36) Menin, Belgium
- Height: 1.82 m (6 ft 0 in)
- Weight: 71 kg (157 lb)

Cycling career
- Sport: Cycling
- Current team: Retired
- Discipline: Road
- Role: Rider
- Rider type: Sprinter

Amateur teams
- 2010: Beveren 2000
- 2011–2012: EFC–Omega Pharma–Quick-Step
- 2019: Wielerteam Decock–Van Eyck–Devos Capoen

Professional teams
- 2013: Etixx–IHNed
- 2013: Cofidis (stagiaire)
- 2014–2015: Cofidis
- 2016: Roubaix–Métropole Européenne de Lille
- 2017: Pauwels Sauzen–Vastgoedservice
- 2018: Tarteletto–Isorex

Louis Verhelst (born 28 August 1990 in Menin) is a Belgian former professional cyclist.

== Major results ==
2008
1st Grand Prix Bati-Metallo
2011
6th Paris–Roubaix Espoirs
9th Dwars door de Antwerpse Kempen
9th GP van de stad Geel
2012
1st Stage 3 Tour de l'Eure-et-Loir
1st Stage 4 Three Days of Cherbourg
5th Paris–Roubaix Espoirs
8th Grand Prix Criquielion
9th De Kustpijl
10th Ronde Pévéloise
2013
Boucle de l'Artois

1st Mountains classification
1st Stage 1

1st Stage 1 Circuit des Ardennes
1st Stage 1 Tour de Bretagne Cycliste
5th Overall Course de la Solidarité Olympique
5th Memorial Van Coningsloo
8th Grand Prix de la Ville de Lillers
2014
6th Halle–Ingooigem
10th Overall World Ports Classic
2017
2nd Overall Tour de Côte d'Ivoire

1st Stages 4, 5 & 6
