= 2009 Tour of California =

UCI America Tour

Race details
- Dates: February 14–22, 2009
- Stages: 8+Prologue
- Distance: 780.44 mi (1,256 km)
- Winning time: 31h 28' 21"

Results
Jersey awarded to the overall winner	Winner	Levi Leipheimer (USA)	(Astana)
	Second	David Zabriskie (USA)	(Garmin–Slipstream)
	Third	Michael Rogers (AUS)	(Team Columbia–High Road)
Jersey awarded to the mountains classification winner	Mountains	Jason McCartney (USA)	(Team Saxo Bank)
Jersey awarded to the youth classification winner	Youth	Robert Gesink (NED)	(Rabobank)
Jersey awarded to the sprints classification winner	Sprints	Mark Cavendish (GBR)	(Team Columbia–High Road)
	Team	Astana	

The 2009 Tour of California was the 4th running of the Tour of California, an annual cycling race contained within the state of California. The event was staged February 14–22 and began with a prologue in the state capital of Sacramento. The event was held as part of the schedule of both the UCI America Tour and USA Cycling Professional Tour. The race was won by Levi Leipheimer for the third consecutive year.

== Race details ==
The Fourth Tour of California covered nine days and 780.44 miles (1,256.00 km), starting with a flat 2.4 miles (3.9 km) prologue near the California State Capitol in Sacramento on February 14, 2009. Drawing many of the top cyclists from around the world, the Tour of California generated an estimated revenue of $100 million for the state of California.

The Astana team included two-time returning champion Levi Leipheimer, and seven-time Tour de France winner Lance Armstrong. The 2006 champion, Floyd Landis returned, riding for OUCH–Maxxis.

Tour organizers have switched the route from year to year, hoping to reach out to fans in different parts of the state and maintain the challenge of the race. Santa Cruz, one of the cities added for the 2009 running, expected added costs of $100,000 to cover public services and accommodations for lodging and meals for the cycling teams, and was expecting 250,000 fans to attend the end of Stage 2. The sales and hotel taxes generated by drawing tourists at a traditionally slow time of the year were expected to help recover the costs of hosting the event. Stage 2 also took the peloton across the Golden Gate Bridge for the first time in the tour's history.

In another first, Stage 4 includes an excursion through the Central Valley and the Sierra Nevada foothills, starting in Merced, then passing through the foothill towns of Mariposa and Oakhurst, and finishing in Clovis (adjacent to Fresno).

The tour organizers tried to integrate climbing into nearly every day's stage; only the prologue, time trial and Stage 5 — the tour's longest at 134.3 miles (216.1 km) — had no climbs. The 2009 Tour features at least one King of the Mountain summit on each other stage, with the Tour's technical director proclaiming that the difficult climbs in the course they designed having the potential to have the leader change on a daily basis.

The eighth stage alone, the last of the tour, stretching nearly 100 miles (160 km) from Rancho Bernardo to Escondido featured four King of the Mountain summits including a climb of Palomar Mountain, home of the Palomar Observatory, which runs for 7 miles (11 km), climbing 4,200 feet (1,300 m) at an average grade of 7%, with 21 switchbacks on the mountain that reaches an elevation of 5,123 feet (1,561 m).

=== Teams ===
UCI ProTour Teams

- ALM - Ag2r–La Mondiale
- AST - Astana
- GRM - Garmin–Slipstream
- LIQ - Liquigas
- QST - Quick-Step
- RAB - Rabobank
- SAX - Team Saxo Bank
- THR - Team Columbia–High Road

UCI Professional Continental Teams

- BMC - BMC Racing Team
- CTT - Cervélo TestTeam

UCI Continental Teams

- BPC - Bissell
- COL - Colavita–Sutter Home
- FAS - Fly V Australia
- JBC - Jelly Belly Cycling Team
- OCM - OUCH–Maxxis
- RRC - Rock Racing
- TT1 - Team Type 1

== Stages ==
For the first time, the 2009 tour had an additional 8th stage meant to increase the competitiveness of the event.

=== Prologue ===
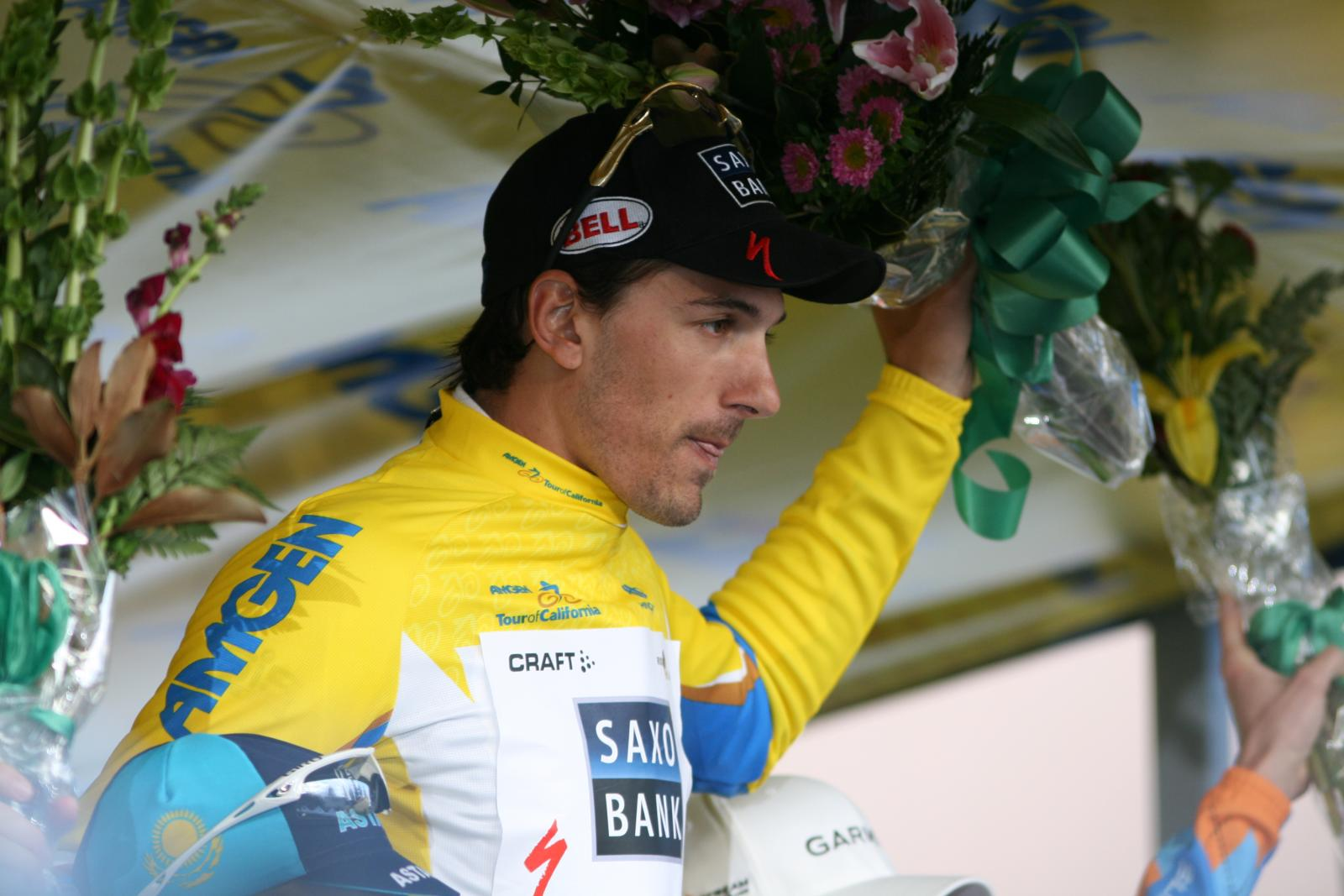
Fabian Cancellara won the prologue

Saturday, February 14
Sacramento
Start Time: 1:30 PM
Miles: 2.4
KM: 3.9
End ETA: 4:00 PM

Prologue Result

	Cyclist	Team	Time
1	Fabian Cancellara (SUI)	Team Saxo Bank	4' 32"
2	Levi Leipheimer (USA)	Astana	+ 1"
3	David Zabriskie (USA)	Garmin–Slipstream	+ 2"
4	Michael Rogers (AUS)	Team Columbia–High Road	+ 2"
5	Thor Hushovd (NOR)	Cervélo TestTeam	+ 3"
6	George Hincapie (USA)	Team Columbia–High Road	+ 3"
7	Tom Boonen (BEL)	Quick-Step	+ 3"
8	Mark Renshaw (AUS)	Team Columbia–High Road	+ 4"
9	Svein Tuft (CAN)	Garmin–Slipstream	+ 4"
10	Lance Armstrong (USA)	Astana	+ 4"

=== Stage 1 ===
Sunday, February 15
Davis to Santa Rosa
Start Time: 12:00 noon
Miles: 107.6
KM: 173.2
End ETA: 3:56–5:01 PM

Francisco Mancebo of Rock Racing broke away after 5 miles of racing, and stayed away almost all day. He was briefly joined by Tim Johnson and David Kemp in his breakaway effort, but he later broke away from them as well, and they were reabsorbed by the peloton. A 23-man chase group formed as Mancebo neared Santa Rosa, which included four members of Astana, working for two-time defending race champion Levi Leipheimer, as well as some other overall favorites such as Ivan Basso. Race officials decided to extend the "crash zone", the area in which riders would be granted the same finishing time as the group they were in on crashing (should they crash) from the final lap of the Santa Rosa circuit to the first, since the road was saturated by a steady downpour of rain. The chase group started out 12 minutes behind Mancebo and closed the time gap to 1'07" at the beginning of the first lap of the Santa Rosa circuit. They subsequently slowed at the end of the first circuit (since the only thing left to gain was the stage win - the group that was together at the beginning of the first circuit were all given the same finishing time, relative to Mancebo) and allowed some riders to attack, chief among them Vincenzo Nibali and Jurgen Van de Walle, who joined Mancebo at the beginning of the last lap. Mancebo managed to outsprint Nibali and Van de Walle to the line. Stage placings were taken on the first time the riders crossed the finish line, but Van de Walle and Nibali were awarded identical sprint classification points for finishing second and third as the riders credited with finishing second and third, Leipheimer and Michael Rogers.

Stage 1 Result

	Cyclist	Team	Time
1	Francisco Mancebo (ESP)	Rock Racing	4h 11' 07"
2	Levi Leipheimer (USA)	Astana	+ 1' 07"
3	Michael Rogers (AUS)	Team Columbia–High Road	+ 1' 07"
4	Jens Voigt (GER)	Team Saxo Bank	+ 1' 07"
5	Chris Horner (USA)	Astana	+ 1' 07"
6	Steve Morabito (SUI)	Astana	+ 1' 07"
7	Óscar Sevilla (ESP)	Rock Racing	+ 1' 07"
8	Vincenzo Nibali (ITA)	Liquigas	+ 1' 07"
9	Andy Schleck (LUX)	Team Saxo Bank	+ 1' 07"
10	Lance Armstrong (USA)	Astana	+ 1' 07"

General Classification after Stage 1

	Cyclist	Team	Time
1	Francisco Mancebo (ESP)	Rock Racing	4h 15' 46"
2	Levi Leipheimer (USA)	Astana	+ 1' 02"
3	David Zabriskie (USA)	Garmin–Slipstream	+ 1' 03"
4	Michael Rogers (AUS)	Team Columbia–High Road	+ 1' 03"
5	Lance Armstrong (USA)	Astana	+ 1' 05"
6	Chris Horner (USA)	Astana	+ 1' 05"
7	Thomas Lövkvist (SWE)	Team Columbia–High Road	+ 1' 13"
8	José Luis Rubiera (ESP)	Astana	+ 1' 13"
9	Vincenzo Nibali (ITA)	Liquigas	+ 1' 13"
10	Robert Gesink (NED)	Rabobank	+ 1' 14"

=== Stage 2 ===
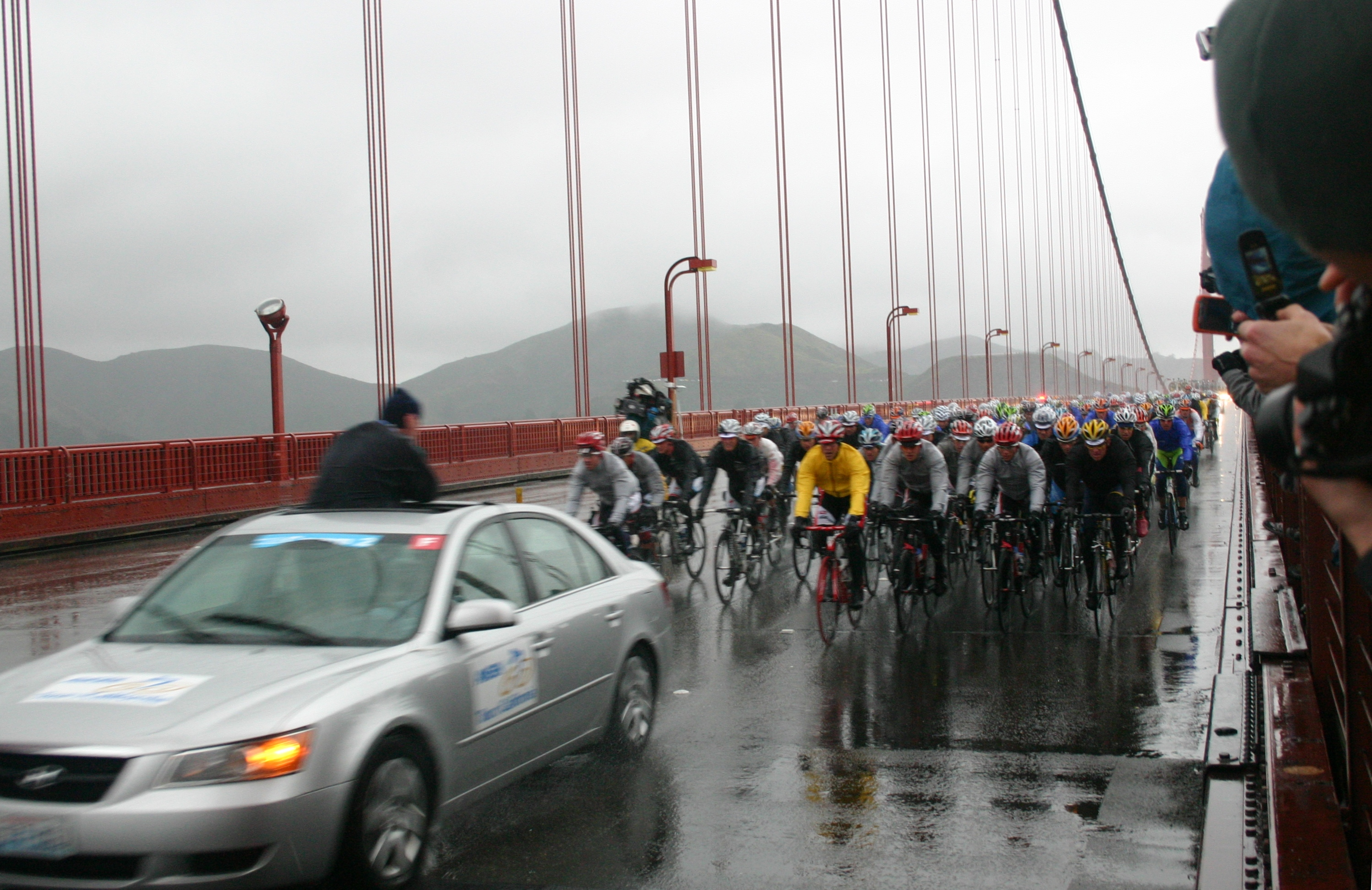
The peloton crossing Golden Gate Bridge

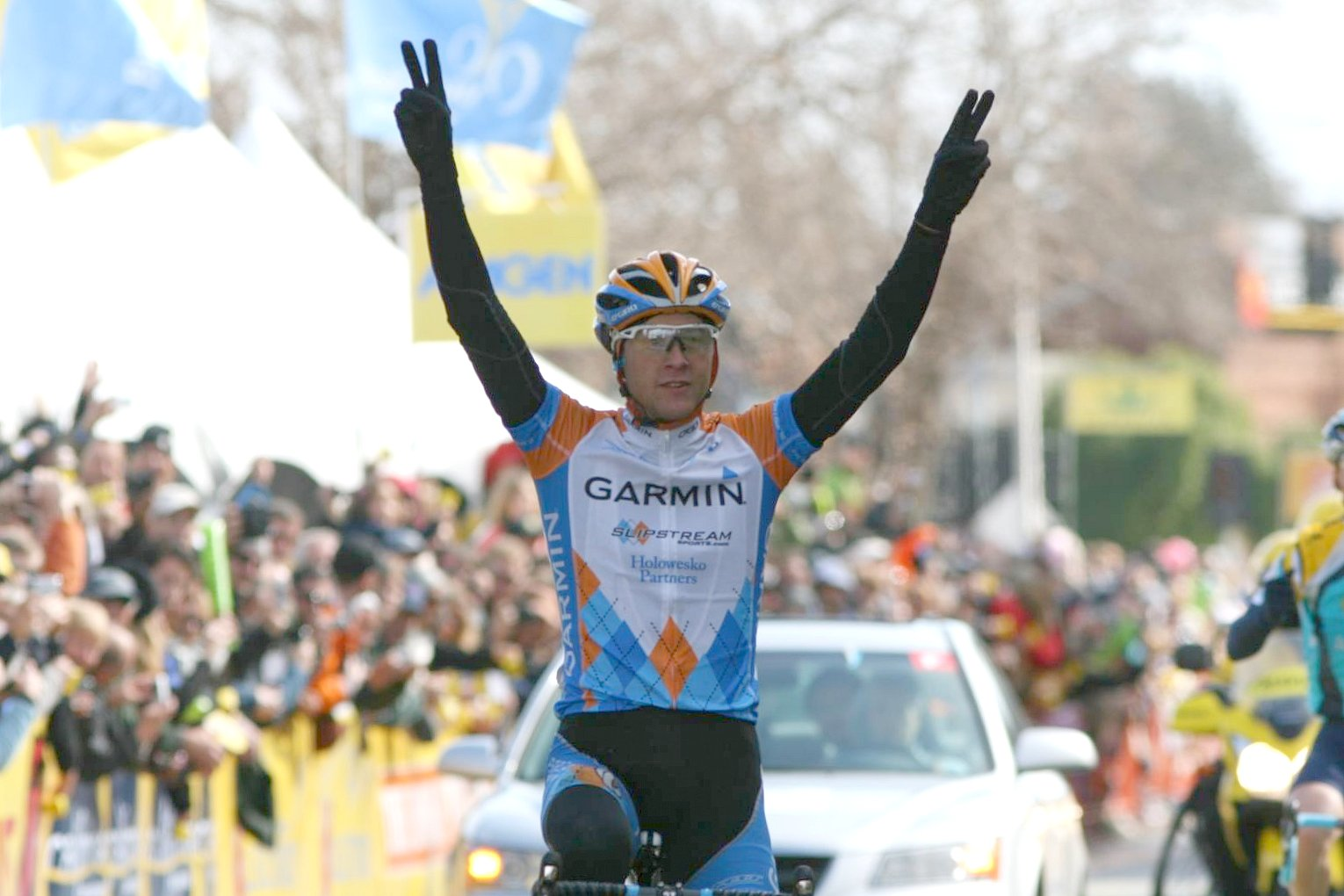
Tom Peterson won the stage

Monday, February 16
Sausalito to Santa Cruz
Start Time: 8:30 AM
Miles: 115.9
KM: 186.6
End ETA: 12:52–2:03 PM
Note: For the first time, the peloton rode across the Golden Gate Bridge.

After a few unsuccessful breakaway attempts immediately following the neutral zone, Rabobank's Grischa Niermann was the first rider to break free of the peloton. He was quickly joined by Garmin-Slipstream's Steven Cozza and eight other riders, to form a ten-man break that held a four- to five-minute advantage over the peloton for most of the stage. The best placed rider in the break was Ben Jacques-Maynes of Bissell, 5'05" behind race leader Francisco Mancebo, whose Rock Racing team paced the peloton calmly, content to let the breakaway get a lead. When the peloton reached the beginning of the climb of Bonny Doon road, Astana took over the pace, and the time gap to the breakaway fell precipitously. On their respective ways up the climb, Carlos Barredo attacked from the leading group of ten and Levi Leipheimer from the peloton, each coming free. Leipheimer gradually overtook members of the day's breakaway as they faltered on the climb, eventually reaching Barredo, Tom Peterson, and Jason McCartney (Peterson and McCartney had themselves caught Barredo only moments earlier) to take first position on the road. Leipheimer was the first to the top of the climb, and he and Peterson stayed together on the descent. A 17-man chase group paced by Lance Armstrong reabsorbed all the other members of the morning breakaway. Peterson took the stage win uncontested, with Leipheimer just behind him, and the Armstrong group having closed to 20 seconds behind them.

Stage 2 Result

	Cyclist	Team	Time
1	Tom Peterson (USA)	Garmin–Slipstream	5h 06' 21"
2	Levi Leipheimer (USA)	Astana	s.t.
3	Michael Rogers (AUS)	Team Columbia–High Road	+ 20"
4	Chris Horner (USA)	Astana	+ 20"
5	Óscar Sevilla (ESP)	Rock Racing	+ 20"
6	Kevin Seeldraeyers (BEL)	Quick-Step	+ 20"
7	Tom Danielson (USA)	Garmin–Slipstream	+ 20"
8	Robert Gesink (NED)	Rabobank	+ 20"
9	Grischa Niermann (GER)	Rabobank	+ 20"
10	David Zabriskie (USA)	Garmin–Slipstream	+ 20"

General Classification after Stage 2

	Cyclist	Team	Time
1	Levi Leipheimer (USA)	Astana	9h 23' 02"
2	Michael Rogers (AUS)	Team Columbia–High Road	+ 24"
3	David Zabriskie (USA)	Garmin–Slipstream	+ 28"
4	Lance Armstrong (USA)	Astana	+ 30"
5	Chris Horner (USA)	Astana	+ 34"
6	Janez Brajkovič (SLO)	Astana	+ 38"
7	Thomas Lövkvist (SWE)	Team Columbia–High Road	+ 38"
8	José Luis Rubiera (ESP)	Astana	+ 38"
9	Vincenzo Nibali (ITA)	Liquigas	+ 38"
10	Robert Gesink (NED)	Rabobank	+ 39"

=== Stage 3 ===
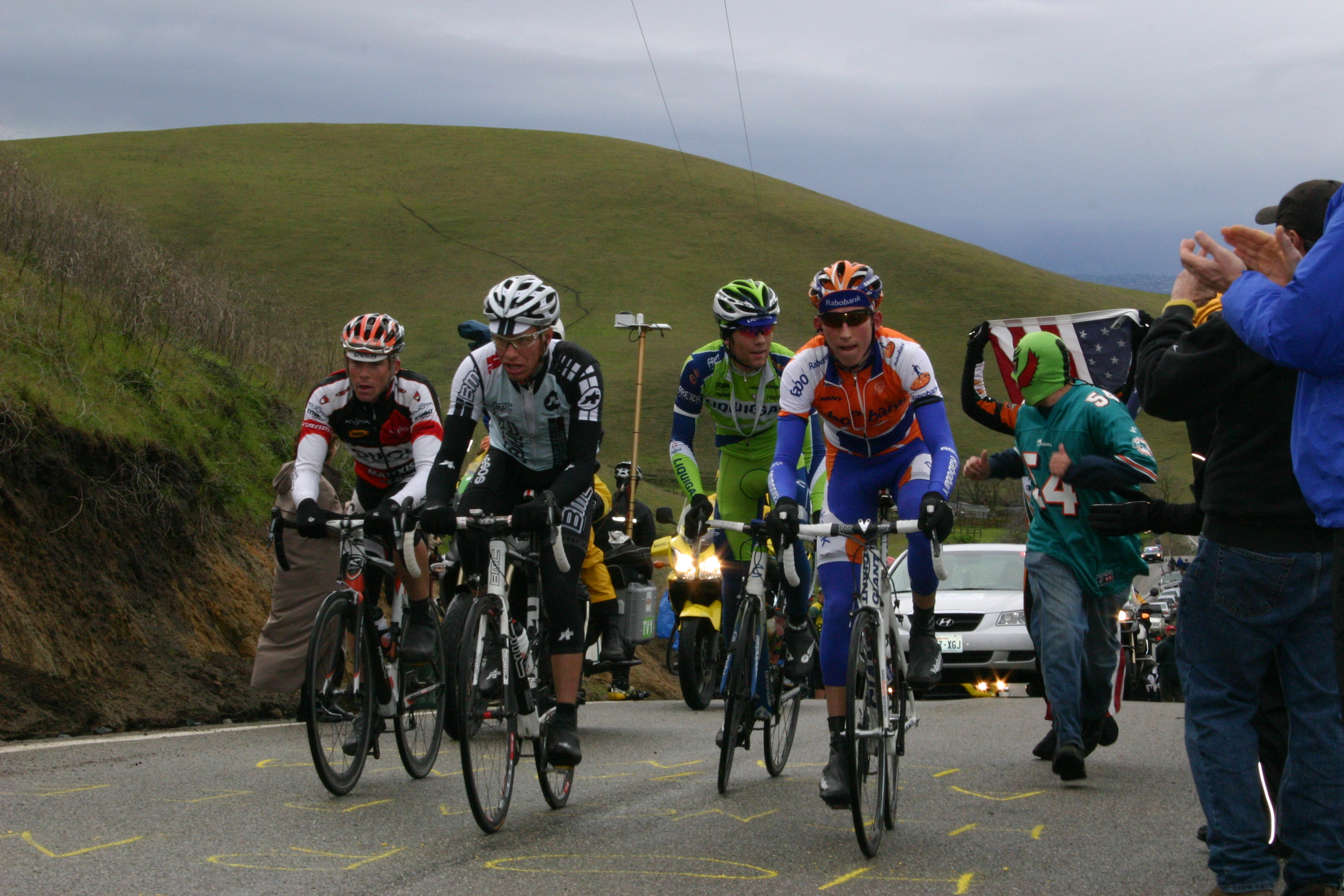
The breakaway comprising Louder, White, Vandborg and Mollema

Tuesday, February 17
San Jose to Modesto
Start Time: 12:00 noon
Miles: 104.2
KM: 167.7
End ETA: 3:53–4:55 PM

A 4-man breakaway formed immediately after the stage's neutral zone, comprising Bauke Mollema of Rabobank, Jeff Louder of BMC, Bradley White of OUCH, and Brian Vandborg of Liquigas. The best-placed among them was Mollema, two minutes behind race leader Levi Leipheimer (the rest were nearly 24 minutes behind Leipheimer). King of the Mountains leader Francisco Mancebo joined them shortly thereafter and topped the climb up Sierra Road in first position, padding his lead. He then rejoined the peloton. The breakaway's lead extended to nearly six minutes, which was increased partially because Leipheimer crashed at the front of the peloton at about the 30 mile mark causing the Astana-paced bunch to slow to allow him to rejoin them. The time gap held steady at between four and five minutes for most of the stage, until Team Columbia-High Road, Quick Step, and Cervélo TestTeam came forward after the descent of the second climb of the day to take the pace, working to get the field together so their respective strong sprinters would have a chance at the stage win. Louder attacked from the leading group on the way into Modesto, and only Mollema could answer. They were subsequently caught in the middle of the Modesto circuit, and a classic bunched sprint saw the stage win go to Thor Hushovd.

Stage 3 Result

	Cyclist	Team	Time
1	Thor Hushovd (NOR)	Cervélo TestTeam	4h 28' 13"
2	Óscar Freire (ESP)	Rabobank	s.t.
3	Mark Renshaw (AUS)	Team Columbia–High Road	s.t.
4	Tyler Farrar (USA)	Garmin–Slipstream	s.t.
5	Mark Cavendish (GBR)	Team Columbia–High Road	s.t.
6	Brett Lancaster (AUS)	Cervélo TestTeam	s.t.
7	Sebastian Haedo (ARG)	Colavita–Sutter Home	s.t.
8	Fred Rodriguez (USA)	Rock Racing	s.t.
9	Markus Zberg (SUI)	BMC Racing Team	s.t.
10	Pedro Horrillo (ESP)	Rabobank	s.t.

General Classification after Stage 3

	Cyclist	Team	Time
1	Levi Leipheimer (USA)	Astana	13h 51' 14"
2	Michael Rogers (AUS)	Team Columbia–High Road	+ 24"
3	David Zabriskie (USA)	Garmin–Slipstream	+ 28"
4	Lance Armstrong (USA)	Astana	+ 30"
5	Chris Horner (USA)	Astana	+ 34"
6	Janez Brajkovič (SLO)	Astana	+ 38"
7	Thomas Lövkvist (SWE)	Team Columbia–High Road	+ 38"
8	José Luis Rubiera (ESP)	Astana	+ 38"
9	Vincenzo Nibali (ITA)	Liquigas	+ 38"
10	Robert Gesink (NED)	Rabobank	+ 39"

=== Stage 4 ===
Wednesday, February 18
Merced to Clovis
Start Time: 11:00 AM
Miles: 115.4
KM: 185.7
End ETA: 3:19–4:29 PM

Several unsuccessful breakaway attempts occurred in the first hour of racing. The breakaway that got away involved Francisco Mancebo, Jason McCartney, Serge Pauwels, and Tyler Hamilton. Mancebo took maximum points in the climbs and intermediate sprints available to him. After topping the fourth climb of the day, Mancebo dropped and rejoined the peloton. The breakaway's biggest advantage was close to six minutes before the peloton, paced chiefly by Team Columbia-High Road, began to chase in earnest, on the descent from the fifth and last climb. The catch occurred with about two miles left to race. A Rabobank rider attacked with the last half mile but was caught by Mark Cavendish, who launched his sprint early but held on in a photo finish for the stage win.

Stage 4 Result

	Cyclist	Team	Time
1	Mark Cavendish (GBR)	Team Columbia–High Road	4h 42' 38"
2	Tom Boonen (BEL)	Quick-Step	s.t.
3	Juan José Haedo (ARG)	Team Saxo Bank	s.t.
4	Thor Hushovd (NOR)	Cervélo TestTeam	s.t.
5	Tyler Farrar (USA)	Garmin–Slipstream	s.t.
6	Markus Zberg (SUI)	BMC Racing Team	s.t.
7	Fred Rodriguez (USA)	Rock Racing	s.t.
8	Sebastian Haedo (ARG)	Colavita–Sutter Home	s.t.
9	Bernard Sulzberger (AUS)	Fly V Australia	s.t.
10	Martin Elmiger (SUI)	Ag2r–La Mondiale	s.t.

General Classification after Stage 4

	Cyclist	Team	Time
1	Levi Leipheimer (USA)	Astana	18h 33' 52"
2	Michael Rogers (AUS)	Team Columbia–High Road	+ 24"
3	David Zabriskie (USA)	Garmin–Slipstream	+ 28"
4	Lance Armstrong (USA)	Astana	+ 30"
5	Chris Horner (USA)	Astana	+ 34"
6	Janez Brajkovič (SLO)	Astana	+ 38"
7	Thomas Lövkvist (SWE)	Team Columbia–High Road	+ 38"
8	José Luis Rubiera (ESP)	Astana	+ 38"
9	Vincenzo Nibali (ITA)	Liquigas	+ 38"
10	Robert Gesink (NED)	Rabobank	+ 39"

=== Stage 5 ===
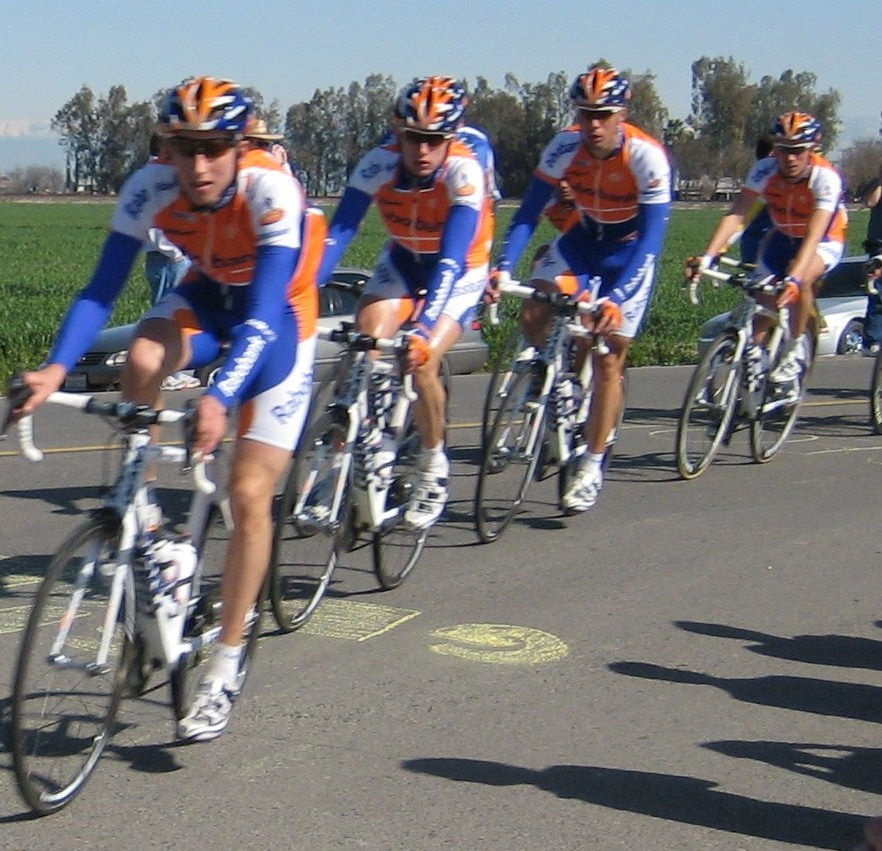
Members of the Rabobank team cycling through the San Joaquin Valley southwest of Visalia

Thursday, February 19
Visalia to Paso Robles
Start Time: 10:00 AM
Miles: 134.3
KM: 216.1
End ETA: 3:00–4:22 PM

This was a rather straightforward day of racing, on a course without even a single categorized climb. After five miles, a six-man breakaway formed, that was eventually whittled to four: Matthew Crane, Glen Chadwick, Pieter Weening, and Cameron Evans. Racing under clear blue skies for the first time in the Tour, the four were caught with about three miles to left to race, as the teams of the prominent sprinters ratcheted up the pace in the peloton to bring them back. The finish was contested in another mass sprint, won for the second day in a row by Mark Cavendish.

Stage 5 Result

	Cyclist	Team	Time
1	Mark Cavendish (GBR)	Team Columbia–High Road	5h 07' 28"
2	Tom Boonen (BEL)	Quick-Step	s.t.
3	Pedro Horrillo (ESP)	Rabobank	s.t.
4	Francesco Chicchi (ITA)	Liquigas	s.t.
5	Thor Hushovd (NOR)	Cervélo TestTeam	s.t.
6	Sebastian Haedo (ARG)	Colavita–Sutter Home	s.t.
7	Fred Rodriguez (USA)	Rock Racing	s.t.
8	Martin Elmiger (SUI)	Ag2r–La Mondiale	s.t.
9	Bernard Sulzberger (AUS)	Fly V Australia	s.t.
10	Karl Menzies (AUS)	OUCH–Maxxis	s.t.

General Classification after Stage 5

	Cyclist	Team	Time
1	Levi Leipheimer (USA)	Astana	23h 41' 20"
2	Michael Rogers (AUS)	Team Columbia–High Road	+ 24"
3	David Zabriskie (USA)	Garmin–Slipstream	+ 28"
4	Lance Armstrong (USA)	Astana	+ 30"
5	Chris Horner (USA)	Astana	+ 34"
6	Janez Brajkovič (SLO)	Astana	+ 38"
7	Thomas Lövkvist (SWE)	Team Columbia–High Road	+ 38"
8	José Luis Rubiera (ESP)	Astana	+ 38"
9	Vincenzo Nibali (ITA)	Liquigas	+ 38"
10	Robert Gesink (NED)	Rabobank	+ 39"

=== Stage 6 ===
Friday, February 20
Solvang - Time Trial
Start Time: 12:00 noon
Miles: 15
KM: 24
End ETA: 2:50 PM

Early times to beat were set by Saxo Bank riders Jens Voigt and Gustav Larsson, with Larsson 13 seconds better of the two (though Voigt's ride was enough to propel him into fourth place in the General Classification). They stood for almost the whole stage, with noted time trial specialists such as George Hincapie and Stef Clement failing to top them. Even former world time trial champion Michael Rogers could not beat Larsson's time. The reigning American national champion David Zabriskie was the first to beat Larsson, by nine seconds. Yellow jersey wearer and two-time defending Tour of California and Solvang time trial champion Levi Leipheimer was the last man to take the course. He was two seconds better than Zabriskie at the intermediate time check and had eight seconds on him at the line, winning the stage.

Stage 6 Result

	Cyclist	Team	Time
1	Levi Leipheimer (USA)	Astana	30' 41"
2	David Zabriskie (USA)	Garmin–Slipstream	+ 8"
3	Gustav Larsson (SWE)	Team Saxo Bank	+ 17"
4	Michael Rogers (AUS)	Team Columbia–High Road	+ 22"
5	Jens Voigt (GER)	Team Saxo Bank	+ 30"
6	George Hincapie (USA)	Team Columbia–High Road	+ 36"
7	Tom Zirbel (USA)	Bissell	+ 39"
8	Jason McCartney (USA)	Team Saxo Bank	+ 41"
9	Stef Clement (NED)	Rabobank	+ 43"
10	Thomas Lövkvist (SWE)	Team Columbia–High Road	+ 51"

General Classification after Stage 6

	Cyclist	Team	Time
1	Levi Leipheimer (USA)	Astana	24h 12' 00"
2	David Zabriskie (USA)	Garmin–Slipstream	+ 36"
3	Michael Rogers (AUS)	Team Columbia–High Road	+ 46"
4	Jens Voigt (GER)	Team Saxo Bank	+ 1' 10"
5	Thomas Lövkvist (SWE)	Team Columbia–High Road	+ 1' 29"
6	Lance Armstrong (USA)	Astana	+ 1' 46"
7	Robert Gesink (NED)	Rabobank	+ 1' 54"
8	Janez Brajkovič (SLO)	Astana	+ 1' 59"
9	Chris Horner (USA)	Astana	+ 2' 13"
10	Francisco Mancebo (ESP)	Rock Racing	+ 2' 15"

=== Stage 7 ===
Saturday, February 21
Santa Clarita to Pasadena
Start Time: 12:00 noon
Miles: 88.9
KM: 143
End ETA: 3:17–3:50 PM

A very aggressive first hour of racing saw many attempted attacks reeled in by the race leader's Astana team. It wasn't until nearly the half the stage, about 40 miles, had been covered that a successful breakaway group of ten formed. They attained a maximum advantage of four minutes, but for the better part of the stage the time gap held steady between two and three minutes, as Astana was content to let them get that lead. On the descent of the one climb of the day, King of the Mountains leader Francisco Mancebo clipped a small rock and tumbled off his bike, suffering a concussion and elbow and hand fractures, which forced him to abandon the race and surrender the KOM lead to Jason McCartney. The riders took five laps on a finishing circuit in the city of Pasadena. On the second lap, an even split in the breakaway formed, with five riders coming 20 seconds clear of the others, but by the end of the third, the group was one again. On the fourth lap, Fränk Schleck attacked from the back of the group and got clear for several minutes, but was eventually caught. The last split saw Rinaldo Nocentini, Hayden Roulston, and Pieter Weening come free on the sprint toward the finish, with Nocentini winning the stage. The other members of the breakaway finished 7 seconds back, and the peloton was 2' 19" behind the stage winner.

Stage 7 Result

	Cyclist	Team	Time
1	Rinaldo Nocentini (ITA)	Ag2r–La Mondiale	3h 24' 44"
2	Hayden Roulston (NZL)	Cervélo TestTeam	s.t.
3	Pieter Weening (NED)	Rabobank	s.t.
4	Markus Zberg (SUI)	BMC Racing Team	+ 7"
5	Martin Elmiger (SUI)	Ag2r–La Mondiale	+ 7"
6	Chris Baldwin (USA)	Rock Racing	+ 7"
7	George Hincapie (USA)	Team Columbia–High Road	+ 7"
8	Fränk Schleck (LUX)	Team Saxo Bank	+ 7"
9	Christian Vande Velde (USA)	Garmin–Slipstream	+ 7"
10	Addy Engels (NED)	Quick-Step	+ 7"

General Classification after Stage 7

	Cyclist	Team	Time
1	Levi Leipheimer (USA)	Astana	27h 39' 02"
2	David Zabriskie (USA)	Garmin–Slipstream	+ 36"
3	Michael Rogers (AUS)	Team Columbia–High Road	+ 45"
4	Jens Voigt (GER)	Team Saxo Bank	+ 1' 10"
5	Thomas Lövkvist (SWE)	Team Columbia–High Road	+ 1' 29"
6	Lance Armstrong (USA)	Astana	+ 1' 46"
7	Robert Gesink (NED)	Rabobank	+ 1' 54"
8	Janez Brajkovič (SLO)	Astana	+ 1' 59"
9	Chris Horner (USA)	Astana	+ 2' 13"
10	Vincenzo Nibali (ITA)	Liquigas	+ 2' 24"

=== Stage 8 ===
Sunday, February 22
Rancho Bernardo to Escondido
Start Time: 12:00 noon
Miles: 96.8
KM: 155.8
End ETA: 3:34–4:43 PM

What was called the Tour of California's queen stage again saw very early attacking. Jason McCartney joined a three-man break that came free of the peloton almost immediately and topped the first two of four categorized climbs on the course in first position, assuring his victory in the King of the Mountains classification. Numerous splits occurred going up the mammoth Mount Palomar climb, with race leader Levi Leipheimer isolated from his teammates at one point, for the first and only time in the Tour, as he had to answer attacks from David Zabriskie and Michael Rogers. A group of GC leaders, along with most of team Astana, consolidated on the descent. Four riders came clear and were in the lead approaching the last climb of the day - Vincenzo Nibali, Fränk Schleck, Bauke Mollema, and Glen Chadwick. Nibali, 2' 21" behind Leipheimer, was a small threat to the race lead, but the Astana-paced leading group kept the time gap at around one minute. After numerous attacks, only Nibali and Schleck remained out front. The chase from the Astana-led group proved too slow to catch Nibali and Schleck, and they were able to survive to finish and contest the stage win between themselves. Schleck opened up a small gap on the Italian in the final straightaway and won the stage.

Stage 8 Result

	Cyclist	Team	Time
1	Fränk Schleck (LUX)	Team Saxo Bank	3h 48' 40"
2	Vincenzo Nibali (ITA)	Liquigas	+ 0"
3	George Hincapie (USA)	Team Columbia–High Road	+ 39"
4	Rory Sutherland (AUS)	OUCH–Maxxis	+ 39"
5	Grischa Niermann (GER)	Rabobank	+ 39"
6	José Luis Rubiera (ESP)	Astana	+ 39"
7	Yaroslav Popovych (UKR)	Astana	+ 39"
8	Jens Voigt (GER)	Team Saxo Bank	+ 39"
9	Levi Leipheimer (USA)	Astana	+ 39"
10	Hubert Dupont (FRA)	Ag2r–La Mondiale	+ 39"

Final General Classification

	Cyclist	Team	Time
1	Levi Leipheimer (USA)	Astana	31h 28' 21"
2	David Zabriskie (USA)	Garmin–Slipstream	+ 36"
3	Michael Rogers (AUS)	Team Columbia–High Road	+ 45"
4	Jens Voigt (GER)	Team Saxo Bank	+ 1' 10"
5	Thomas Lövkvist (SWE)	Team Columbia–High Road	+ 1' 29"
6	Vincenzo Nibali (ITA)	Liquigas	+ 1' 35"
7	Lance Armstrong (USA)	Astana	+ 1' 46"
8	Robert Gesink (NED)	Rabobank	+ 1' 54"
9	Tom Danielson (USA)	Garmin–Slipstream	+ 2' 24"
10	José Luis Rubiera (ESP)	Astana	+ 2' 48"

== Classification leadership ==
In the 2009 Tour of California, five different jerseys were awarded. For the general classification, calculated by adding the finishing times of the stages per cyclist, the leader received a yellow jersey. This classification is considered the most important of the Tour of California, and the winner of the general classification is considered the winner of the Tour of California.

Additionally, there was also a sprints classification, akin to what is called the points classification in other races, which awarded a green jersey. In the sprints classification, cyclists received points for finishing in the top 10 in a stage. The winner got 15 points, second place 12, third 10, fourth 7, and one point less per place down the line, to a single point for tenth. In addition, some points could be won in intermediate sprints.

There was also a mountains classification, which awarded a red jersey. In the mountains classifications, points were won by reaching the top of a mountain before other cyclists. Each climb was categorized, either first, second, third, or fourth category, with more points available for the harder climbs.

There was also a youth classification. This classification is calculated the same way as the general classification, but only young cyclists (under 23) are in. The leader of the young rider classification received a white jersey.

The fifth jersey was not awarded on the basis of a time or points-based classification. It was for each stage's "Most Courageous" rider, akin to the combativity award in the Tour de France. The rider who received this award wore a blue jersey in the next stage. Unlike the Tour de France's combativity award, there was no overall award given.

There was also a classification for teams. In this classification, the times of the best three cyclists per stage were added, and the team with the lowest time was leader.

Stage	Winner	General Classification	Youth Classification	Mountains Classification	Sprint Classification	Team Classification	Most Courageous
P	Fabian Cancellara	Fabian Cancellara	Mark Cavendish	none	Levi Leipheimer	Team Columbia–High Road	Lance Armstrong
1	Francisco Mancebo	Francisco Mancebo	Robert Gesink	Francisco Mancebo	Francisco Mancebo	Astana	Ivan Basso
2	Tom Peterson	Levi Leipheimer	Robert Gesink	Francisco Mancebo	Francisco Mancebo	Astana	Ben Jacques-Maynes
3	Thor Hushovd	Levi Leipheimer	Robert Gesink	Francisco Mancebo	Francisco Mancebo	Astana	Bradley White
4	Mark Cavendish	Levi Leipheimer	Robert Gesink	Francisco Mancebo	Francisco Mancebo	Astana	Tyler Hamilton
5	Mark Cavendish	Levi Leipheimer	Robert Gesink	Francisco Mancebo	Mark Cavendish	Astana	Matthew Crane
6	Levi Leipheimer	Levi Leipheimer	Robert Gesink	Francisco Mancebo	Mark Cavendish	Astana	George Hincapie
7	Rinaldo Nocentini	Levi Leipheimer	Robert Gesink	Jason McCartney	Mark Cavendish	Astana	Christian Vande Velde
8	Fränk Schleck	Levi Leipheimer	Robert Gesink	Jason McCartney	Mark Cavendish	Astana	Fränk Schleck
Final		Levi Leipheimer	Robert Gesink	Jason McCartney	Mark Cavendish	Astana	n/a

Jersey wearers when one rider is leading two or more competitions

If a cyclist leads two or more competitions at the end of a stage, he receives all those jerseys. The next stage, he can only wear one jersey, and he wears the jersey representing leadership in the most important competition (yellow first, then green, then red, then white). The other jerseys that the cyclists holds are worn in the next stage by the second-placed rider (or, if needed, third- or fourth-placed rider) of that classification.

- After stage 1, Francisco Mancebo received the yellow jersey, the green jersey, and the red jersey, because he was leading the general, sprints, and mountains classifications. In stage 2, he wore the yellow jersey, Tim Johnson wore the green jersey, and David Kemp wore the red jersey.
- In stages 3 and 5, Jason McCartney wore the red jersey.
- In stage 4, Bauke Mollema wore the red jersey.

== Final standings ==
=== General Classification ===
#	Rider	Team	Time
1	Levi Leipheimer (USA)	Astana	31h 28' 21"
2	David Zabriskie (USA)	Garmin–Slipstream	+ 36"
3	Michael Rogers (AUS)	Team Columbia–High Road	+ 45"
4	Jens Voigt (GER)	Team Saxo Bank	+ 1' 10"
5	Thomas Lövkvist (SWE)	Team Columbia–High Road	+ 1' 29"
6	Vincenzo Nibali (ITA)	Liquigas	+ 1' 37"
7	Lance Armstrong (USA)	Astana	+ 1' 46"
8	Robert Gesink (NED)	Rabobank	+ 1' 54"
9	Tom Danielson (USA)	Garmin–Slipstream	+ 2' 24"
10	José Luis Rubiera (ESP)	Astana	+ 2' 48"

=== Teams Classification ===
#	Team	Time
1	Astana	94h 28' 50"
2	Team Saxo Bank	+ 1' 40"
3	Garmin–Slipstream	+ 1' 49"
4	Team Columbia–High Road	+ 2' 46"
5	Rabobank	+ 4' 45"
6	Quick-Step	+ 7' 18"
7	Rock Racing	+ 7' 54"
8	Cervélo TestTeam	+ 34' 55"
9	Ag2r–La Mondiale	+ 36' 22"
10	OUCH–Maxxis	+ 39' 50"

=== King of the Mountains Classification ===
#	Rider	Team	Points
1	Jason McCartney (USA)	Team Saxo Bank	39
2	Tyler Hamilton (USA)	Rock Racing	22
3	Serge Pauwels (BEL)	Cervélo TestTeam	21
4	Levi Leipheimer (USA)	Astana	20
5	Bauke Mollema (NED)	Rabobank	15
6	Jens Voigt (GER)	Team Saxo Bank	12
7	Tim Johnson (USA)	OUCH–Maxxis	10
8	Fränk Schleck (LUX)	Team Saxo Bank	9
9	Steven Cozza (USA)	Garmin–Slipstream	9
10	Robert Gesink (NED)	Rabobank	8

=== Young Rider Classification ===
#	Rider	Team	Time
1	Robert Gesink (NED)	Rabobank	31h 30' 15"
2	Kevin Seeldraeyers (BEL)	Quick-Step	+ 1' 03"
3	Bauke Mollema (NED)	Rabobank	+ 3' 50"
4	Andy Schleck (LUX)	Team Saxo Bank	+ 17' 18"
5	Tom Peterson (USA)	Garmin–Slipstream	+ 21' 29"
6	Steven Cozza (USA)	Garmin–Slipstream	+ 25' 41"
7	Mathias Frank (SUI)	BMC Racing Team	+ 26' 59"
8	Mark Cavendish (GBR)	Team Columbia–High Road	+ 44' 35"
9	Matthew Crane (USA)	Jelly Belly Cycling Team	+ 47' 16"
10	Kiel Reijnen (USA)	Jelly Belly Cycling Team	+ 47' 38"

=== Sprint Classification ===
#	Rider	Team	Points
1	Mark Cavendish (GBR)	Team Columbia–High Road	36
2	Vincenzo Nibali (ITA)	Liquigas	22
3	Fränk Schleck (LUX)	Team Saxo Bank	19
4	Pieter Weening (NED)	Rabobank	18
5	Tyler Farrar (USA)	Garmin–Slipstream	16
6	Rinaldo Nocentini (ITA)	Ag2r–La Mondiale	15
7	Tom Peterson (USA)	Garmin–Slipstream	15
8	Markus Zberg (SUI)	BMC Racing Team	15
9	Martin Elmiger (SUI)	Ag2r–La Mondiale	15
10	Levi Leipheimer (USA)	Astana	14
