= Tour of Virginia =

Race details
- Region: Virginia, United States
- Discipline: Road
- Competition: USA Cycling National Racing Calendar
- Type: Stage race
- Web site: www.tourofvirginia.com

History
- First edition: 2003
- Editions: 5
- Final edition: 2007
- First winner: Scottie Weiss (USA)
- Most wins: Scottie Weiss (USA) (2)
- Final winner: Javier de Jesús Zapata (COL)

Tour of Virginia was a men's road bicycle racing stage race held annually in Virginia from 2003 to 2007. In 2007, the Tour was renamed from the Tour of Shenandoah. The race was part of USA Cycling National Racing Calendar.

== Past winners ==
- 2007: Javier Zapata, Caico
- 2006: Brent Bookwalter, Priority Health
- 2005: Roman Kilun, Health Net–Maxxis
- 2004: Scottie Weiss, Subway-GoMart
- 2003: Scottie Weiss, Subway-GoMart
