= 2011 Tour de Wallonie =

Race details
- Dates: 23–27 July 2011
- Stages: 5
- Distance: 876.9 km (544.9 mi)
- Winning time: 20h 51' 51"

Results
	Winner	Greg Van Avermaet (BEL)
	Second	Joost van Leijen (NED)
	Third	Ben Hermans (BEL)

The 2011 Tour de Wallonie was the 38th edition of the Tour de Wallonie cycle race and was held on 23–27 July 2011. The race started in Amay and finished in Thuin. The race was won by Greg Van Avermaet.

== General classification ==
Final general classification

Rank	Rider	Time
1	Greg Van Avermaet (BEL)	20h 51' 51"
2	Joost van Leijen (NED)	+ 4"
3	Ben Hermans (BEL)	+ 22"
4	Michał Gołaś (POL)	+ 30"
5	Edwig Cammaerts (BEL)	+ 30"
6	Thomas Degand (BEL)	+ 30"
7	Bert De Waele (BEL)	+ 30"
8	Nikolay Trusov (RUS)	+ 33"
9	Koen de Kort (NED)	+ 33"
10	Nikolas Maes (BEL)	+ 36"
