= 2015 Brabantse Pijl =

2015 UCI Europe Tour
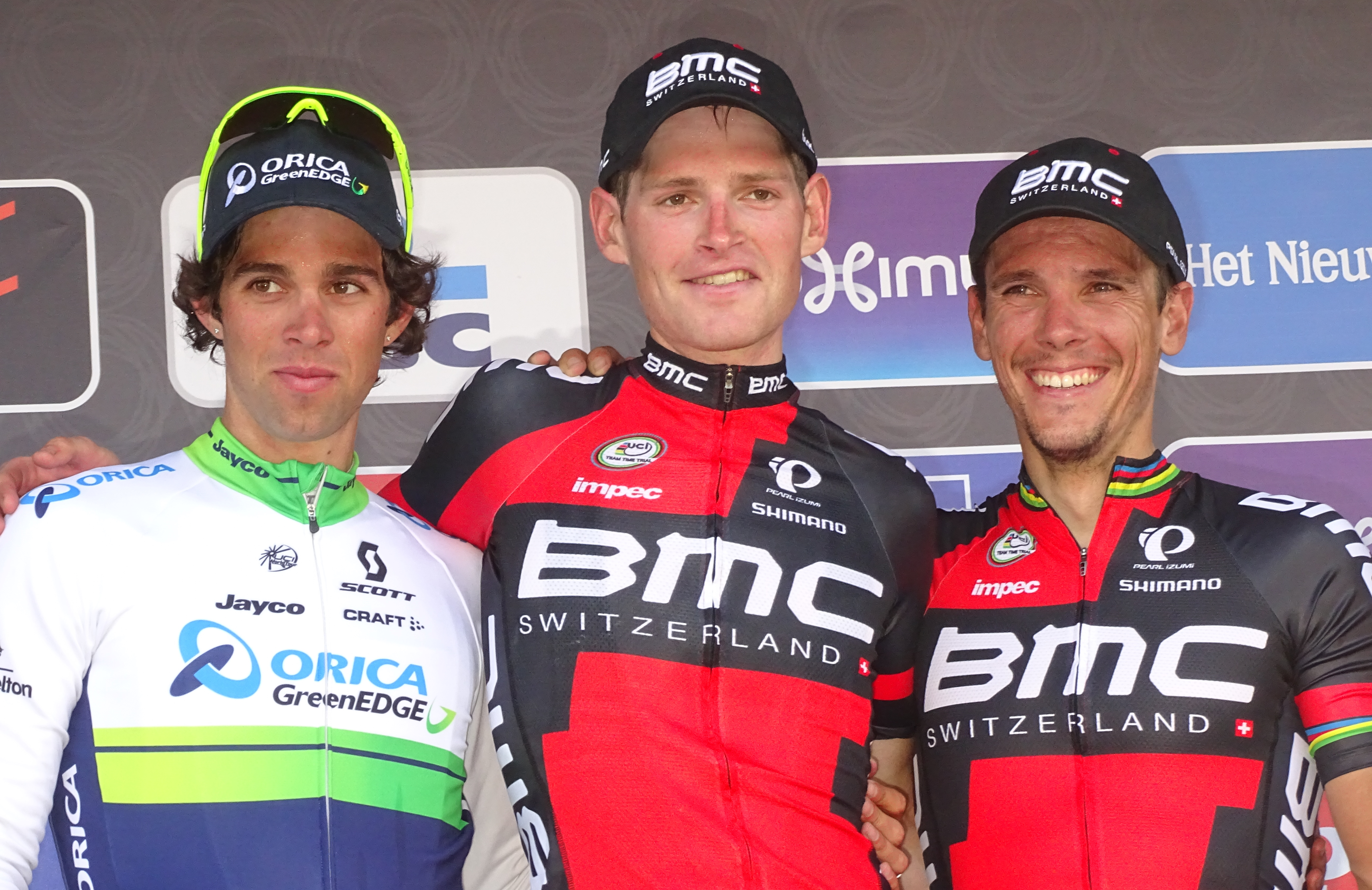
- Up: event poster with previous winner Philippe Gilbert. 2015 podium with Matthews, Hermans and Gilbert.

Race details
- Dates: 15 April 2015
- Distance: 205.4 km (127.6 mi)
- Winning time: 4h 45' 14"

Results
| | Winner | Ben Hermans (BEL) | (BMC Racing Team) |
| | Second | Michael Matthews (AUS) | (Orica–GreenEDGE) |
| | Third | Philippe Gilbert (BEL) | (BMC Racing Team) |

The 2015 Brabantse Pijl was the 55th edition of the Brabantse Pijl road cycling race in Belgium. Held on 15 April 2015, it started in Leuven and ended 205.4 kilometres (127.6 miles) later in Overijse. It was a 1.HC-ranked race that was part of the 2015 UCI Europe Tour. The main difficulty in the race was caused by 26 climbs, as well as twisting roads in the final part of the route.

The race was won from the breakaway by Ben Hermans (BMC Racing Team). A group of fourteen riders finished two seconds behind, with Michael Matthews (Orica–GreenEDGE) second and the defending champion Philippe Gilbert (BMC Racing Team) third.

== Results ==
Michael Matthews (2nd), Ben Hermans (1st) and Philippe Gilbert (3rd).

Result
| Rank | Rider | Team | Time |
|---|---|---|---|
| 1 | Ben Hermans (BEL) | BMC Racing Team | 4h 45' 14" |
| 2 | Michael Matthews (AUS) | Orica–GreenEDGE | + 2" |
| 3 | Philippe Gilbert (BEL) | BMC Racing Team | + 2" |
| 4 | Tony Gallopin (FRA) | Lotto–Soudal | + 2" |
| 5 | Davide Rebellin (ITA) | CCC–Sprandi–Polkowice | + 2" |
| 6 | Nathan Haas (AUS) | Cannondale–Garmin | + 2" |
| 7 | Fabio Felline (ITA) | Trek Factory Racing | + 2" |
| 8 | Maurits Lammertink (NED) | Team Roompot | + 2" |
| 9 | Maciej Paterski (POL) | CCC–Sprandi–Polkowice | + 2" |
| 10 | Dries Devenyns (BEL) | IAM Cycling | + 2" |
