= Meredith Miller =

American cyclist

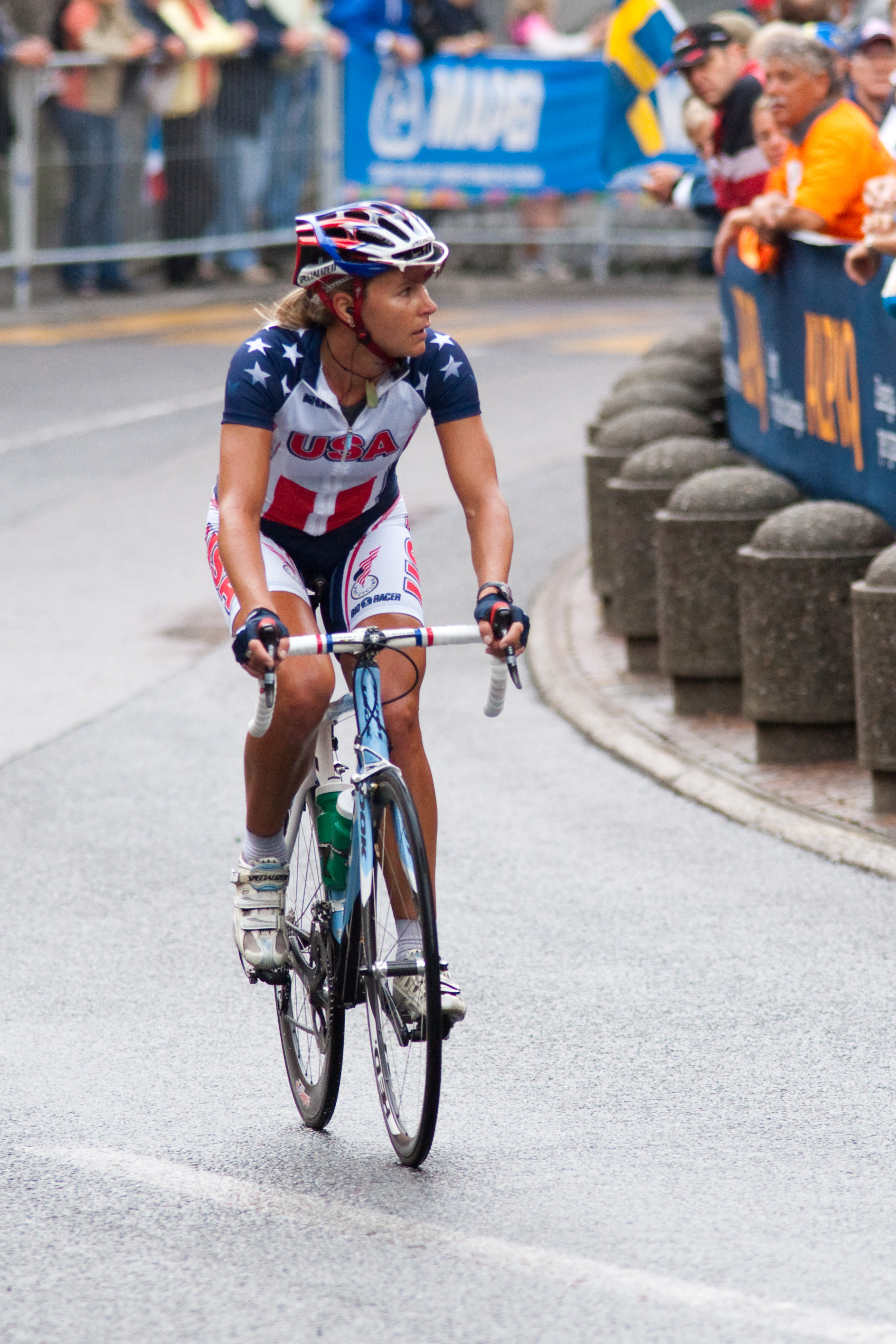
- Miller at the 2009 UCI Road World Championships

Personal information
- Born: December 26, 1973 (age 52) Rockford, Illinois, U.S.
- Height: 5 ft 8 in (173 cm)
- Weight: 147 lb (67 kg)

Cycling career
- Sport: Cycling
- Current team: Rapha Cycling Club
- Disciplines: Road cycling, cyclo-cross and mountain biking

Professional teams
- 2005: Team S.A.T.S
- 2006–2007: Team Lipton
- 2008: Aaron's Pro Cycling
- 2009–2013: TIBCO–To The Top
- 2014–2016: Pepper Palace Pro Cycling p/b The Happy Tooth

Meredith Miller (born December 26, 1973) is a Cyclo cross and road cyclist from United States. She was educated at Guilford High School, where she graduated in 1992, and went on to attend the University of Wisconsin–Madison and San Francisco State University, where she earned a B.S. and an M.A. in kinesiology in 1996 and 2002 respectively. Miller competed in track athletics in high school and soccer in both high school and college. After graduating from college she played semi-professional soccer for a team in Madison for one season before the team disbanded, following which she was introduced to cycling by her then boyfriend. She represented Team USA at the 2009 UCI Road World Championships and at the 2010, 2011, 2012, 2013, 2014, 2015 and 2016 UCI Cyclocross World Championships.

== Professional cycling career ==
In 2002, she signed her first professional contract with the Talgo America Cycling Team, joining Dede Demet-Barry, Sue Palmer-Komar, and Anne Samplonius. Miller slotted into the role of domestique.

Moving to Denmark in the fall of 2002, she joined the Danish S.A.T.S. professional cycling team for the 2003 season. She did four ten-day stage races as well as another 35 race days that season. She followed a similar program in 2004 and 2005 as well. She raced most of the World Cup in those years, including: Tour of Flanders, Fleche Wallone, Tour L'Aude, Giro d'Italia Femminile, Grande Boucle Feminine Internationale, as well as a swing to North America for races like the Coupe de Monde Cyclist Feminine de Montreal.

While she moved to New Zealand in 2005, she continued racing for Team S.A.T.S., living in France for much of the season. S.A.T.S. folded at the end of the season.

In 2006, while still living in New Zealand, her job brought her to the United States, racing for Team Lipton. The squad was growing from being a regional presence to a national program, with heavy hitters like Miller, Laura Van Guilder, and Kristin Armstrong. The team had plans to support their riders through the 2008 Olympics.

Riding for the team in 2007, Miller won both the second stage and the overall at the San Dimas Stage Race.

The team folded at the end of 2007, and Miller joined Aaron's Pro Women's Cycling team in 2008.

The year with Aaron's was momentous. As the season was closing in, she decided to try cyclocross. Team director Carmen D'Alusio, a 'crosser herself, suggested doing a full cyclocross program, and helped arrange a spot for her on the California Giant Strawberries team, as both Aaron's and Cal Giant had Specialized as a sponsor. She debuted at the second annual CrossVegas race, finishing in ninth place. The racing was fun, the season a success, and the relationship remained for the next six seasons.

In 2009, Miller joined Team TIBCO. She joined up with 2008 national road champ Brooke Miller, as well as Katharine Carroll, Jerika Hutchinson, Amber Rais, Alison Starnes, and Lauren Tamayo. While signed as a domestique to support Miller, she rode to her biggest victory on the road, winning the national road race championship. That resulted in a ride at the World Road Championships in Mendrisio, Switzerland, where she rode in support of Kristin Armstrong (4th).

In 'cross, she grew as a racer, finishing second at the nationals in 2009, earning a ride at the 2010 Cyclocross World Championships. The trip starting a seven-year streak of representing the United States at cyclocross worlds.

2010, she continued to split her time between TIBCO on the road and Cal Giant in cyclocross. At TIBCO, she became the road captain, calling the shots for the team from inside the peloton. In cyclocross, she finished third at nationals.

As the road season drew to a close in 2013, she decided to call it quits on her road career, and dedicate herself to cyclocross. She told VeloNews, "This year, I'm still having fun, but I'm definitely getting tired and not wanting to be away from home so much anymore, and just felt it was the right time, I still don't know what I'm going to do next."

Next turned out to be starting a cyclocross team. For the 2014 season, she started the Noosa Professional Cyclocross Team. Her role was rider, co-manager, and co-owner. She secured and managed the sponsors, worked on public relations, managed the team budget and logistics and staff, and still managed to train and race. The biggest win in her 'cross career came at CrossVegas, debuting her new team at the event, in front of the entire bike industry and a star-packed field.

While racing for Noosa in cyclocross, she raced intermittently for Pepper Palace on the road to keep fitness ahead of the cyclocross season.

== Retirement ==
She retired from cyclocross at the conclusion of the 2015–16 cyclocross season.

Even in retirement, she's been busy. She won Grinduro in 2016, followed up by a fifth place in a "local" cyclocross race, the U.S. Open of Cyclocross in Boulder.

After Grinduro, she told Cyclocross Magazine, "When I retired from racing, I still loved my bike. I still loved racing, in fact. I was tired of intervals. I was tired of having to ride my bike. Without the stress of structured training, I've enjoyed riding my bike even more."

In January 2018 she won the U.S. Women's National Singlespeed Cyclocross Championship in Reno, Nevada.

She currently works for Shimano America and lives in Boulder, Colorado.
