= Roy Curvers =

Dutch road cyclist

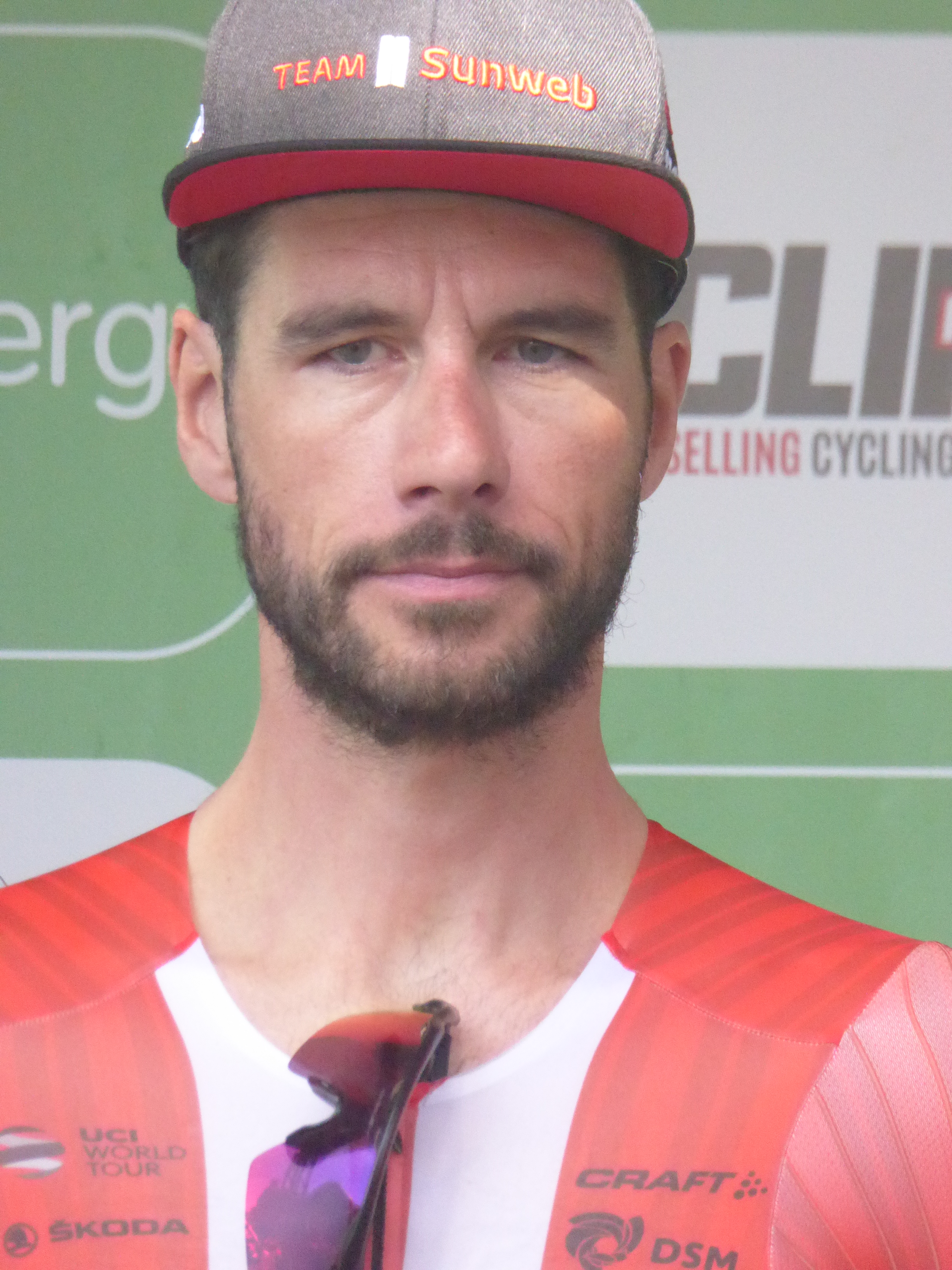
- Curvers at the 2019 Tour of Britain

Personal information
- Full name: Roy Curvers
- Born: 27 December 1979 (age 46) Haelen, Netherlands
- Height: 1.88 m (6 ft 2 in)
- Weight: 74 kg (163 lb; 11.7 st)

Cycling career
- Sport: Cycling
- Current team: Team Picnic–PostNL
- Discipline: Road
- Role: Rider (retired); Directeur sportif
- Rider type: Classics specialist

Amateur team
- 2003–2007: Van Hemert Groep Cycling

Professional team
- 2008–2019: Skil–Shimano

Managerial team
- 2020–: Team Sunweb

Roy Curvers (born 27 December 1979) is a Dutch former professional road cyclist, who competed professionally for Skil–Shimano and its successors between 2008 and 2019. The winner of the Halle–Ingooigem race in 2011, Curvers now works as a directeur sportif for UCI WorldTeam Team Picnic–PostNL.

== Major results ==
2004
9th Schaal Sels
2005
8th Omloop van de Vlaamse Scheldeboorden
9th Profronde van Fryslan
2006
3rd Profronde van Fryslan
9th Ronde van Drenthe
9th Omloop der Kempen
9th Rund um die Nürnberger Altstadt
10th Classic Loire Atlantique
10th Omloop van de Vlaamse Scheldeboorden
2007
1st Stage 8 Olympia's Tour
2nd Profronde van Fryslan
4th Grote Prijs Stad Zottegem
6th Ronde van Overijssel
7th Ronde van het Groene Hart
9th Nokere Koerse
9th Delta Profronde
2008
3rd Omloop van het Houtland
9th Omloop van de Vlaamse Scheldeboorden
2009
7th Ronde van Drenthe
7th Kampioenschap van Vlaanderen
9th Profronde van Fryslan
9th Sparkassen Giro Bochum
2010
8th Paris–Brussels
10th Overall Circuit Franco-Belge
2011
1st Halle–Ingooigem
7th Sparkassen Giro Bochum
8th Omloop van het Houtland
9th Paris–Tours
2013
4th Grand Prix Impanis-Van Petegem
5th Overall World Ports Classic
5th Grote Prijs Jef Scherens
2015
5th Kampioenschap van Vlaanderen
10th Binche–Chimay–Binche

=== Grand Tour general classification results timeline ===
Grand Tour	2011	2012	2013	2014	2015	2016	2017	2018
Giro d'Italia	—	—	—	—	—	—	—	128
Tour de France	—	135	145	116	106	122	142	—
Vuelta a España	156	—	—	—	—	—	—	—

Legend
—	Did not compete
DNF	Did not finish
