= Ramon Sinkeldam =

Dutch road cyclist

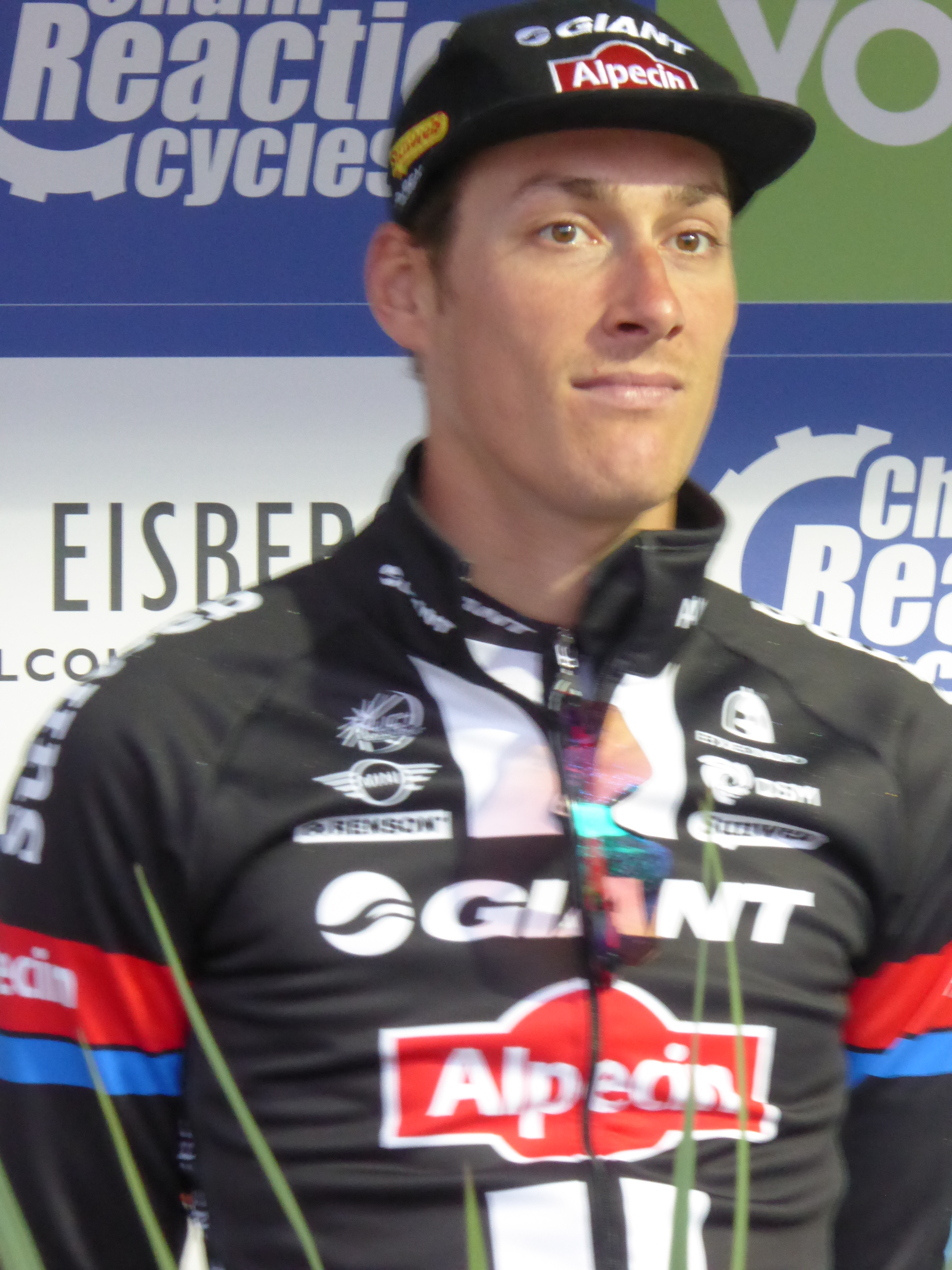
- Sinkeldam in 2016

Personal information
- Full name: Ramon Sinkeldam
- Born: 9 February 1989 (age 37) Wormer, the Netherlands
- Height: 1.93 m (6 ft 4 in)
- Weight: 75 kg (165 lb; 11 st 11 lb)

Cycling career
- Sport: Cycling
- Current team: Retired
- Discipline: Road
- Role: Rider
- Rider type: Sprinter; Classics rider

Amateur team
- 2007–2011: Rabobank Continental Team

Professional teams
- 2012–2017: Project 1t4i
- 2018–2022: FDJ
- 2023–2024: Alpecin–Deceuninck

Major wins
- One-day races and Classics National Road Race Championships (2017)
Medal record
Representing Netherlands
Men's road bicycle racing
European Championships
Gold medal – first place	2019 Alkmaar	Mixed Team Relay

Ramon Sinkeldam (born 9 February 1989) is a Dutch former cyclist, who competed as a professional from 2012 to 2024.

== Career ==
=== Amateur career ===
Born in Wormer, Sinkeldam rode for the Rabobank Continental Team for his entire amateur career, between 2007 and 2011. During this time, he won the Paris–Roubaix Espoirs race in 2011, as well as winning the 2011 Ronde van Limburg and the national under-23 road race championships in 2011, having finished second in the two previous years. In his youth Sinkeldam was also active in mountain biking and in cyclocross.

=== Professional career ===
Sinkeldam turned professional for the 2012 season, joining the Project 1t4i team. He achieved his first professional victories with the team in October 2012, winning two stages at the Tour of Hainan in China. He finished the race sixth overall. He was named in the start list for the 2015 Tour de France. He earned no wins in 2013, but did place 3rd overall at 2.HC race Four Days of Dunkirk. In 2014, Sinkeldam won the second stage of the World Ports Classic and finished in 2nd overall. 2015 was his most successful season yet, as he won one day events Velothon Berlin and Binche–Chimay–Binche. Sinkeldam was also 2nd in the Dutch National Road Race Championships, behind Niki Terpstra.

On 23 January 2016, he was one of the six members of the Team Giant–Alpecin who were hit by a motorist who drove into on-coming traffic while they were training in Spain. All riders were in stable condition.

In May 2019, he was named in the startlist for the 2019 Giro d'Italia.

== Major results ==
2006
3rd Road race, National Junior Road Championships
2009
2nd Road race, National Under-23 Road Championships
2010
2nd Road race, National Under-23 Road Championships
9th Münsterland Giro
2011
1st Road race, National Under-23 Road Championships
1st Paris–Roubaix Espoirs
1st Ronde van Limburg
5th Overall Olympia's Tour
8th Overall Volta ao Alentejo
2012 (2 pro wins)
6th Overall Tour of Hainan

1st Stages 5 & 8

2013
2nd Ronde van Zeeland Seaports
3rd Overall Four Days of Dunkirk
2014 (1)
2nd Overall World Ports Classic

1st Young rider classification
1st Stage 2

2nd Overall Tour de Picardie
2nd Ronde van Zeeland Seaports
6th Grand Prix Impanis-Van Petegem
2015 (2)
1st Velothon Berlin
1st Binche–Chimay–Binche
2nd Road race, National Road Championships
8th Vattenfall Cyclassics
2017 (1)
1st Road race, National Road Championships
9th Scheldeprijs
2018 (1)
1st Paris–Chauny
3rd Road race, National Road Championships
2019
1st Team relay, UEC European Road Championships
2022
6th Tour de Vendée
2024
3rd Road race, National Road Championships

=== Grand Tour general classification results timeline ===
Grand Tour	2013	2014	2015	2016	2017	2018	2019	2020	2021	2022	2023
Giro d'Italia	—	—	—	—	—	—	133	DNF	—	132	DNF
Tour de France	—	—	DNF	143	148	134	—	—	—	—	DNF
Vuelta a España	DNF	136	—	—	—	—	—	—	127	—	—

Legend
—	Did not compete
DNF	Did not finish
IP	In progress

Sporting positions
Preceded by Dylan Groenewegen	Dutch National Road Race; Champion; 2017	Succeeded by Mathieu van der Poel
