= Tom Peterson (cyclist) =

American road racing cyclist (born 1986)

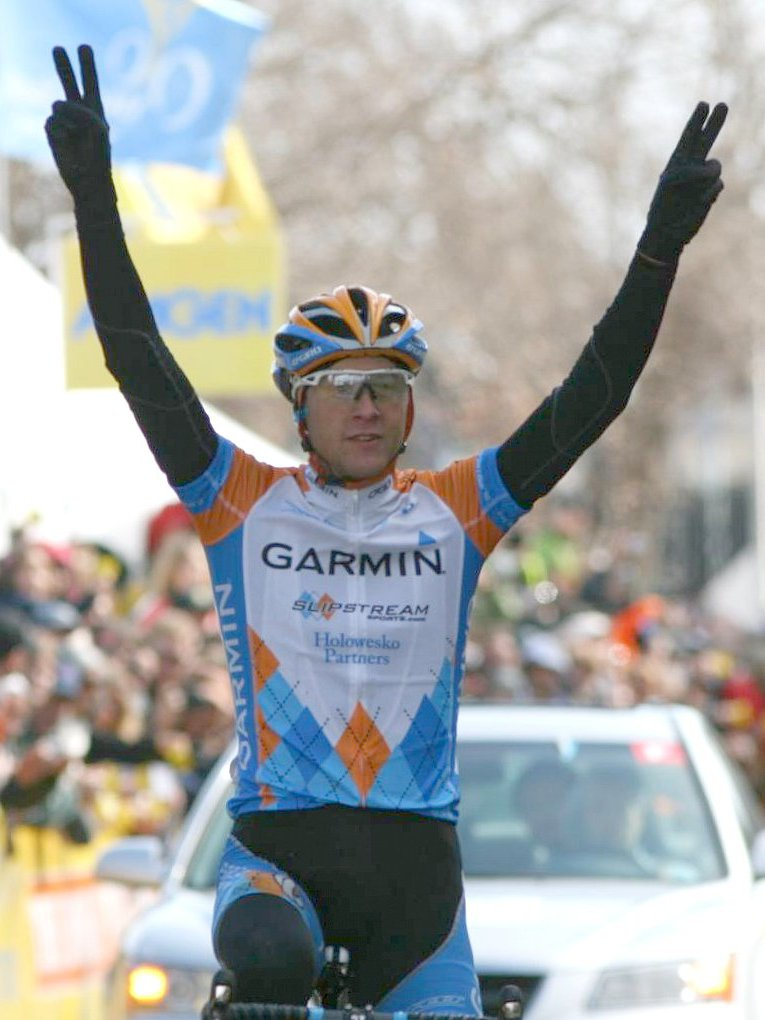
- Peterson at the 2009 Tour of California

Personal information
- Full name: Thomas Peterson
- Born: December 24, 1986 (age 39) Everett, Washington, United States
- Height: 1.80 m (5 ft 11 in)
- Weight: 70 kg (154 lb)

Cycling career
- Sport: Cycling
- Discipline: Road
- Role: Rider
- Rider type: Domestique

Amateur teams
- 2002: RAD Racing
- 2003–2005: Recycled Cycles Racing
- 2005: Broadmark Capital

Professional teams
- 2006–2012: TIAA–CREF
- 2013–2014: Argos–Shimano

Thomas Peterson (born December 24, 1986) is an American former professional road racing cyclist who last rode for UCI ProTeam Giant–Shimano. Following a six-year stint with TIAA–CREF, Peterson joined Argos–Shimano for the 2013 and 2014 seasons. Peterson is a domestique and a resident of Bellevue, Washington. Peterson is an owner of the Peterson Bike Shop in Renton, Washington, United States.

== Career achievements ==
=== Major results ===
2004
1st National Junior Road Race Championships
2005
3rd Overall Tour de Taiwan
2006
1st Youth classification Tour of California
6th National Under-23 Road Race Championships
2007
1st Stage 3 Tour of the Gila
2008
3rd National Under-23 Road Race Championships
4th Overall Vuelta Chihuahua Internacional
7th Overall Tour of the Bahamas
2009
1st Mountains classification Herald Sun Tour
1st Stage 2 Tour of California
8th Overall Bayern Rundfahrt
10th Overall Tour of Austria
2011
4th Overall Tour of Turkey

=== Grand Tour general classification timeline ===
Grand Tour	2010	2011	2012	2013
Giro d'Italia	—	88	—	—
Tour de France	—	—	—	—
Vuelta a España	25	—	115	116

Legend
DSQ	Disqualified
DNF	Did not finish
