= 2009–10 UCI Oceania Tour =

- Sixth edition of the UCI Oceania Tour

Details
- Dates: 11 October 2009–31 January 2010
- Location: Oceania
- Races: 5

Champions
- Individual champion: Michael Matthews (AUS) (Team Jayco-Skins)
- Teams' champion: Team Jayco-Skins
- Nations' champion: Australia

The 2009–10 UCI Oceania Tour was the sixth season of the UCI Oceania Tour. The season began on 11 October 2009 with the Herald Sun Tour and ended on 31 January 2010 with the Tour of Wellington.

The points leader, based on the cumulative results of previous races, wears the UCI Oceania Tour cycling jersey. Peter McDonald of Australia was the defending champion of the 2008–09 UCI Oceania Tour. Michael Matthews of Australia was crowned as the 2009–10 UCI Oceania Tour champion.

Throughout the season, points are awarded to the top finishers of stages within stage races and the final general classification standings of each of the stages races and one-day events. The quality and complexity of a race also determines how many points are awarded to the top finishers, the higher the UCI rating of a race, the more points are awarded. The UCI ratings from highest to lowest are as follows:

- Multi-day events: 2.HC, 2.1 and 2.2
- One-day events: 1.HC, 1.1 and 1.2

== Events ==
=== 2009 ===
Date	Race Name	Location	UCI Rating	Winner	Team
11–17 October	Herald Sun Tour	Australia	2.1	Bradley Wiggins (GBR)	Garmin–Slipstream
2–7 November	Tour of Southland	New Zealand	2.2	Heath Blackgrove (NZL)	Zookeepers-Cycle Surgery
13 November	Oceania Cycling Championships – Time Trial	New Zealand	CC	Drew Ginn (AUS)	Australia (national team)
15 November	Oceania Cycling Championships – Road Race	New Zealand	CC	Michael Matthews (AUS)	Australia (national team)

=== 2010 ===
Date	Race Name	Location	UCI Rating	Winner	Team
27–31 January	Tour of Wellington	New Zealand	2.2	Michael Torckler (NZL)	Team Cardno

== Final standings ==
=== Individual classification ===
Rank	Name	Points
1.	Michael Matthews (AUS)	235
2.	Thor Hushovd (NOR)	200
3.	Jonathan Cantwell (AUS)	95
4.	Jack Bauer (NZL)	93
5.	Heath Blackgrove (NZL)	85
6.	Yukiya Arashiro (JPN)	80
7.	Matt Marshall (NZL)	70
8.	John Degenkolb (GER)	70
9.	Romain Feillu (FRA)	70
10.	Taylor Phinney (USA)	60

=== Team classification ===
Rank	Team	Points
1.	Team Jayco-Skins	267
2.	Fly V Australia	248
3.	Cervélo TestTeam	206
4.	Endura Racing	93
5.	Bbox Bouygues Telecom	83
6.	Drapac–Porsche Cycling	79
7.	Thüringer Energie	78
8.	Vacansoleil	73
9.	Trek Livestrong U23	65.66
10.	SpiderTech-Planet Energy	40

=== Nation classification ===
Rank	Nation	Points
1.	Australia	1281.13
2.	New Zealand	548.48

=== Nation under-23 classification ===
Rank	Nation under-23	Points
1.	Australia	605.5
2.	New Zealand	199.16
