= Team Lipton =

Team information
- UCI code: LIP
- Registered: United States
- Founded: 2006
- Disbanded: 2007
- Discipline: Road
- Status: UCI Women's Team

Team name history
- 2006–2007: Team Lipton

Team Lipton (UCI Code: LIP) was a women's professional road bicycle racing team and triathlon team based in the United States and races in elite events on the UCI Women's Road World Cup and USA Cycling National Racing Calendar. The cycling team's title sponsor was Lipton.

== 2007 team roster ==
Ages as of 1 January 2007.

Rider	Date of birth
Kristin Armstrong (USA)	August 11, 1973 (aged 33)
Nicole Suzanne Evans (USA)	May 15, 1978 (aged 28)
Grace Fleury (USA)	August 31, 1978 (aged 28)
Kimberly Geist (USA)	April 29, 1987 (aged 19)
Lauren Tamayo (USA)	October 25, 1983 (aged 23)

Rider	Date of birth
Lara Kroepsch (USA)	November 27, 1978 (aged 28)
Kristen LaSasso (USA)	August 19, 1975 (aged 31)
Meredith Miller (USA)	December 26, 1973 (aged 33)
Brenda Lyons (USA)	July 17, 1969 (aged 37)
Kori Kelley Seehafer (USA)	April 30, 1975 (aged 31)

== Major wins ==
2006
1st Overall San Dimas Stage Race, Kristin Armstrong

1st Stage 1 San Dimas Stage Race, Kristin Armstrong
1st Stage 2 San Dimas Stage Race, Grace Fleury

1st Overall Tour of the Gila, Kristin Armstrong

1st Stages 2 & 5 Tour of the Gila, Kristin Armstrong

1st Stage 4 Joe Martin Stage Race, Kori Seehafer
1st Stage 8 Tour de l'Aude Cycliste Féminin, Grace Fleury
1st Overall Nature Valley Grand Prix, Kristin Armstrong

1st Stages 1 & 4 Nature Valley Grand Prix, Kristin Armstrong
1st Stage 3 Nature Valley Grand Prix, Laura Van Gilder

1st Overall Tour de Toona, Kristin Armstrong

1st Stage 3 Tour de Toona, Kristin Armstrong
1st Stage 6 Tour de Toona, Laura Van Gilder

1st Chris Thater Memorial Criterium, Laura Van Gilder
1st Overall Euregio Ladies Tour, Kristin Armstrong

1st Stage 1, Kristin Armstrong

1st Prologue & Stage 4 Vuelta Ciclista Femenina a el Salvador, Grace Fleury
2007
1st Overall San Dimas Stage Race, Meredith Miller

1st Stage 2, Meredith Miller
1st Stage 3, Lauren Franges

1st Lausanne, Kristin Armstrong
1st Overall Nature Valley Grand Prix, Kristin Armstrong
1st Stages 3, 5 & 6, Kristin Armstrong
1st Overall Tour de Toona, Kristin Armstrong
1st Stage 3, Kori Seehafer
1st Stage 5, Lauren Franges
1st Stage 6, Kristin Armstrong
1st Prologue Route de France Féminine, Kori Seehafer
1st Overall Green Mountain Stagerace, Kristen LaSasso
1st Overall Holland Ladies Tour, Kristin Armstrong

1st Stage 7, Kristin Armstrong

== World and national champions ==
2006
USA National Time Trial Championship, Kristin Armstrong
USA National Time Trial Championship, Kristin Armstrong
World Time Trial Championship, Kristin Armstrong
2007
USA National Time Trial Championship, Kristin Armstrong
