= 2012 World Ports Classic =

2012 UCI Europe Tour
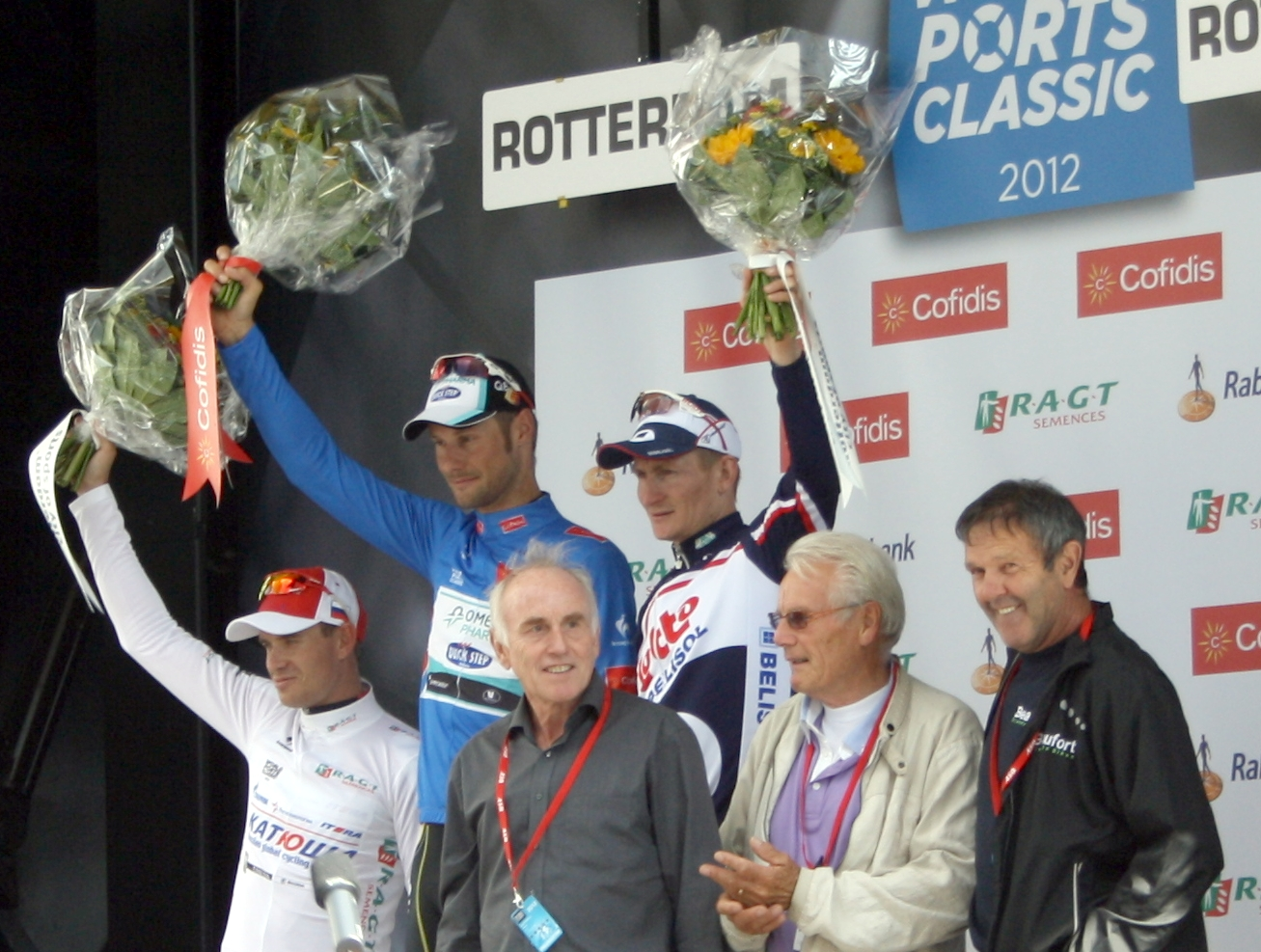
- The podium presentation Alexander Kristoff, Tom Boonen, André Greipel, Joop Zoetemelk, Jan Janssen, Roger De Vlaeminck

Race details
- Dates: 31 Aug—1 Sep
- Stages: 2
- Distance: 362.5 km (225.2 mi)

The 2012 World Ports Classic is the inaugural edition of the two-day cycle race between the port cities of Rotterdam and Antwerp. It is scheduled to start on 31 August 2012 and finish one day later on 1 September 2012.

== Teams Participating ==
- Accent.jobs–Willems Veranda's
- BMC Racing Team
- Bretagne–Schuller
- Cofidis
- Garmin–Sharp
- Team Katusha
- Landbouwkrediet–Euphony
- Liquigas–Cannondale
- Lotto–Belisol
- Omega Pharma–Quick-Step
- Rabobank
- SpiderTech–C10
- Argos–Shimano
- Team NetApp
- Saxo Bank–Tinkoff Bank
- Team Type 1–Sanofi
- Topsport Vlaanderen–Mercator
- Vacansoleil–DCM
- Wallonie Bruxelles–Crédit Agricole

== Stages ==
| Stage | Route | Distance | Date | Winner |
|---|---|---|---|---|
| 1 | Rotterdam to Antwerp | 201 km (124.9 mi) | 31 August | Tom Boonen (BEL) |
| 2 | Antwerp to Rotterdam | 161.5 km (100.4 mi) | 1 September | Theo Bos (NED) |

== Leadership Classifications ==
| Stage | Winner | General classification | Points classification | Young rider classification | Team Classification |
|---|---|---|---|---|---|
| 1 | Tom Boonen | Tom Boonen | Tom Boonen | Alexander Kristoff | Topsport Vlaanderen–Mercator |
| 2 | Theo Bos | Tom Boonen | Tom Boonen | Alexander Kristoff | Topsport Vlaanderen–Mercator |
| Final | | Tom Boonen | Tom Boonen | Alexander Kristoff | Topsport Vlaanderen–Mercator |
