= 2013 World Ports Classic =

2013 UCI Europe Tour

Race details
- Dates: 30 August—31 August
- Stages: 2
- Distance: 356 km (221.2 mi)
- Winning time: 7h 28' 10"

Results
Jersey awarded to the overall winner	Winner	Nikolas Maes (BEL)	(Omega Pharma–Quick-Step)
	Second	Jonathan Cantwell (AUS)	(Saxo–Tinkoff)
	Third	Reinier Honig (NED)	(Crelan–Euphony)
Jersey awarded to the points classification winner	Points	Nikolas Maes (BEL)	(Omega Pharma–Quick-Step)
Jersey awarded to the youth classification winner	Youth	Stig Broeckx (BEL)	(Lotto–Belisol)
	Team	Lotto–Belisol	

The 2013 World Ports Classic was the second edition of the two-day cycle race between the port cities of Rotterdam and Antwerp. It started on 30 August 2013 and finished one day later on 31 August 2013.

== Teams Participating ==
- Omega Pharma–Quick-Step
- Lotto–Belisol
- Belkin Pro Cycling
- Argos–Shimano
- Vacansoleil–DCM
- Team Katusha
- Saxo–Tinkoff
- Garmin–Sharp
- MTN–Qhubeka
- Team Europcar
- Topsport Vlaanderen–Baloise
- NetApp–Endura
- Cofidis
- Crelan–Euphony
- Accent Jobs–Wanty
- Bretagne-Séché Environnement
- Champion System Pro Cycling Team
- Color Code-Biowanze

== Race overview ==
Stage	Route	Distance	Date	Winner
1	Antwerp to Rotterdam	165 km (102.5 mi)	30 August	Jelle Wallays (BEL)
2	Rotterdam to Antwerp	191 km (118.7 mi)	31 August	Maarten Tjallingii (NED)

== Stages ==
=== Stage 1 ===
30 August 2013 – Antwerp to Rotterdam, 165 km (102.5 mi)

Stage 1 Result

	Rider	Team	Time
1	Jelle Wallays (BEL)	Topsport Vlaanderen–Baloise	3h 32' 33"
2	André Greipel (GER)	Lotto–Belisol	+ 26"
3	Alessandro Petacchi (ITA)	Omega Pharma–Quick-Step	+ 26"
4	Kenny van Hummel (NED)	Vacansoleil–DCM	+ 26"
5	Jonathan Cantwell (AUS)	Saxo–Tinkoff	+ 26"
6	Gerald Ciolek (GER)	MTN–Qhubeka	+ 26"
7	Alexander Porsev (RUS)	Team Katusha	+ 26"
8	Nikolas Maes (BEL)	Omega Pharma–Quick-Step	+ 26"
9	Michael Van Staeyen (BEL)	Topsport Vlaanderen–Baloise	+ 26"
10	Danilo Napolitano (ITA)	Accent Jobs–Wanty	+ 26"

General Classification after Stage 1

	Rider	Team	Time
1	Jelle Wallays (BEL)	Topsport Vlaanderen–Baloise	3h 32' 23"
2	André Greipel (GER)	Lotto–Belisol	+ 28"
3	Alessandro Petacchi (ITA)	Omega Pharma–Quick-Step	+ 29"
4	Kenneth Vanbilsen (BEL)	Topsport Vlaanderen–Baloise	+ 33"
5	Reinier Honig (NED)	Crelan–Euphony	+ 35"
6	Gerald Ciolek (GER)	MTN–Qhubeka	+ 35"
7	Kenny van Hummel (NED)	Vacansoleil–DCM	+ 36"
8	Jonathan Cantwell (AUS)	Saxo–Tinkoff	+ 36"
9	Alexander Porsev (RUS)	Team Katusha	+ 36"
10	Nikolas Maes (BEL)	Omega Pharma–Quick-Step	+ 36"

=== Stage 2 ===
31 August 2013 – Rotterdam to Antwerp, 191 km (118.7 mi)

Stage 2 Result

	Rider	Team	Time
1	Maarten Tjallingii (NED)	Belkin Pro Cycling	3h 55' 12"
2	Fréderique Robert (BEL)	Lotto–Belisol	+ 3"
3	Nikolas Maes (BEL)	Omega Pharma–Quick-Step	+ 3"
4	Alexander Porsev (RUS)	Team Katusha	+ 3"
5	Jonas Vangenechten (BEL)	Lotto–Belisol	+ 3"
6	Wouter Mol (NED)	Vacansoleil–DCM	+ 3"
7	Maarten Wynants (BEL)	Belkin Pro Cycling	+ 3"
8	Roy Curvers (NED)	Argos–Shimano	+ 3"
9	Jonathan Cantwell (AUS)	Saxo–Tinkoff	+ 3"
10	Reinier Honig (NED)	Crelan–Euphony	+ 3"

Final General Classification

	Rider	Team	Time
1	Nikolas Maes (BEL)	Omega Pharma–Quick-Step	7h 28' 10"
2	Jonathan Cantwell (AUS)	Saxo–Tinkoff	+ 2"
3	Reinier Honig (NED)	Crelan–Euphony	+ 2"
4	Alexander Porsev (RUS)	Team Katusha	+ 3"
5	Roy Curvers (NED)	Argos–Shimano	+ 4"
6	Wouter Mol (NED)	Vacansoleil–DCM	+ 4"
7	Tristan Valentin (FRA)	Cofidis	+ 4"
8	Stig Broeckx (BEL)	Lotto–Belisol	+ 4"
9	Marko Kump (SLO)	Saxo–Tinkoff	+ 15"
10	Jonas Vangenechten (BEL)	Lotto–Belisol	+ 30"

== Leadership Classifications ==
Stage	Winner	General classification	Points classification	Young rider classification	Team Classification
1	Jelle Wallays	Jelle Wallays	Jelle Wallays	Jelle Wallays	Topsport Vlaanderen–Baloise
2	Maarten Tjallingii	Nikolas Maes	Nikolas Maes	Stig Broeckx	Lotto–Belisol
Final		Nikolas Maes	Nikolas Maes	Stig Broeckx	Lotto–Belisol
