= USA Cycling National Racing Calendar =

Road bicycle racing event series

- Sport: Road bicycle racing
- Founded: 2000
- Country: United States
- Official website: www.usacycling.org/nrc

The USA Cycling National Racing Calendar (NRC) is an annual competition of road bicycle racing events held in the United States and sponsored by USA Cycling. The NRC includes a men's and women's individual and team rankings based on points awarded at the events. The competition is open to amateur and professional riders regardless of national origin.

== Events ==
In 2011, the NRC had 30 events: 8 stage races, 15 crits, 2 one-day road races, and 5 omniums.

In 2012, the NRC has 29 events, and a total prize purse of more than one million dollars.

== Past winners ==
=== Men's individual ===
- 2010: Luis Amaran, Cuba
- 2009: Tom Zirbel, United States
- 2008: Rory Sutherland, Australia
- 2007: Rory Sutherland, Australia
- 2006: Floyd Landis, United States
- 2005: Scott Moninger, United States
- 2004: Chris Horner, United States
- 2003: Chris Horner, United States
- 2002: Chris Horner, United States
- 2001: Trent Klasna, United States

=== Women's individual ===
- 2010: Catherine Cheatley, New Zealand
- 2009: Alison Powers, United States
- 2008: Tina Pic, United States Colavita/Sutter Home
- 2007: Laura Van Gilder, United States, Cheerwine
- 2006: Tina Pic, United States, Colavita/Cooking Light Women's
- 2005: Tina Pic, United States,
- 2004: Tina Pic, United States, Genesis Scuba/FFCC
- 2003: Lyne Bessette, Canada, Saturn Cycling Team
- 2002: Laura Van Gilder, United States, Trek PLUS
- 2001: Lyne Bessette, Canada
- 2000: Tina Pic, United States

=== Men's team ===
- 2010: Fly V Australia
- 2009: Colavita
- 2008: Health Net Pro Cycling Team Presented by Maxxis
- 2007: Health Net Pro Cycling Team Presented by Maxxis
- 2006: Health Net Pro Cycling Team Presented by Maxxis
- 2005: Health Net Pro Cycling Team Presented by Maxxis
- 2004: Health Net Pro Cycling Team Presented by Maxxis
- 2003: Saturn Cycling Team
- 2002: Mercury Cycling Team
- 2001: Mercury Cycling Team

=== Women's team ===
- 2010: Colavita-Baci
- 2009: Team Tibco
- 2008: Cheerwine
- 2007: WebcorBuilders
- 2006: Team Lipton
- 2005: T-Mobile Women
- 2004: Genesis Scuba/FFCC
- 2003: Saturn Cycling Team
- 2002: Saturn Cycling Team
