= Nikolas Maes =

Belgian racing cyclist

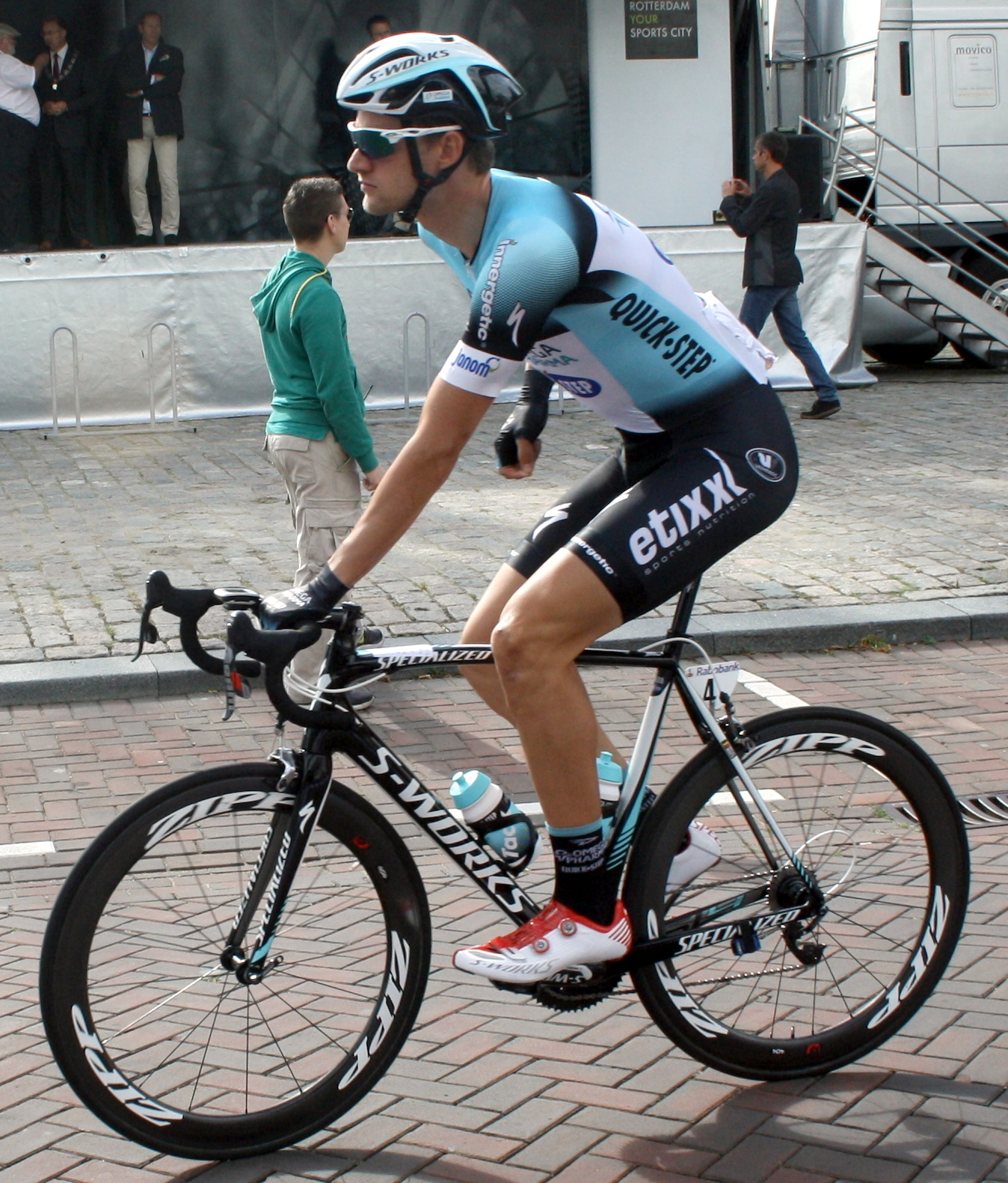
- Maes at the 2013 World Ports Classic.

Personal information
- Full name: Nikolas Maes
- Nickname: Nike
- Born: 9 April 1986 (age 40) Kortrijk, Belgium
- Height: 1.89 m (6 ft 2 1/2 in)
- Weight: 76 kg (168 lb; 12.0 st)

Cycling career
- Sport: Cycling
- Current team: Lotto–Intermarché
- Discipline: Road
- Role: Rider (retired); Directeur sportif
- Rider type: Sprinter; Rouleur

Amateur teams
- 2005–2006: Beveren 2000
- 2006: Chocolade Jacques–Topsport Vlaanderen (stagiaire)

Professional teams
- 2007–2009: Chocolade Jacques–Topsport Vlaanderen
- 2010–2016: Quick-Step
- 2017–2020: Lotto–Soudal

Managerial team
- 2021–: Lotto–Soudal

Nikolas Maes (born 9 April 1986) is a Belgian former professional road bicycle racer, who competed professionally between 2007 and 2020, for the Topsport Vlaanderen–Mercator, Etixx–Quick-Step and Lotto–Soudal teams. He now works as a directeur sportif for his final professional team, UCI WorldTeam Lotto–Intermarché.

== Career ==
Born in Kortrijk, Maes gained the first professional win of his career on the third stage of the Vuelta a Burgos around the province's capital city on 7 August 2009 while riding for the Topsport Vlaanderen–Mercator cycle team.

On 9 September 2009 it was announced he would be joining Team RadioShack for the 2010 season. However, his name was not on the team roster presented on 5 October 2009. He subsequently signed with Quick-Step, winning the Young Rider classification of the Tour of Qatar in 2011 and the General Classification and Points Classification of the 2013 World Ports Classic in the Netherlands.

== Major results ==
2004
3rd Time trial, National Junior Road Championships
2006
1st Circuit de Wallonie
3rd Kattekoers
3rd Druivenkoers Overijse
5th La Côte Picarde
6th Internationale Wielertrofee Jong Maar Moedig
7th Overall Tour de Berlin
8th Ronde van Vlaanderen Belefton
8th Sparkassen Giro Bochum
9th Internatie Reningelst
2007
3rd Druivenkoers Overijse
6th De Vlaamse Pijl
9th Ronde van het Groene Hart
2008
9th Overall Tour of Ireland
2009
1st Stage 3 Vuelta a Burgos
2010
5th Dutch Food Valley Classic
2011
1st Young rider classification Tour of Qatar
10th Overall Tour de Wallonie
2012
1st Stage 2b (TTT) Tour de l'Ain
2013
1st Overall World Ports Classic

1st Points classification

6th Dwars door Vlaanderen
7th Vattenfall Cyclassics
8th Brussels Cycling Classic
2014
4th Halle–Ingooigem
7th Overall Tour de Picardie
8th Kuurne–Brussels–Kuurne
2015
5th Rund um Köln
9th Dwars door Vlaanderen
10th Nokere Koerse
2016
4th Halle–Ingooigem
2018
6th Dwars door het Hageland
