= Bernhard Eisel =

Road bicycle racer

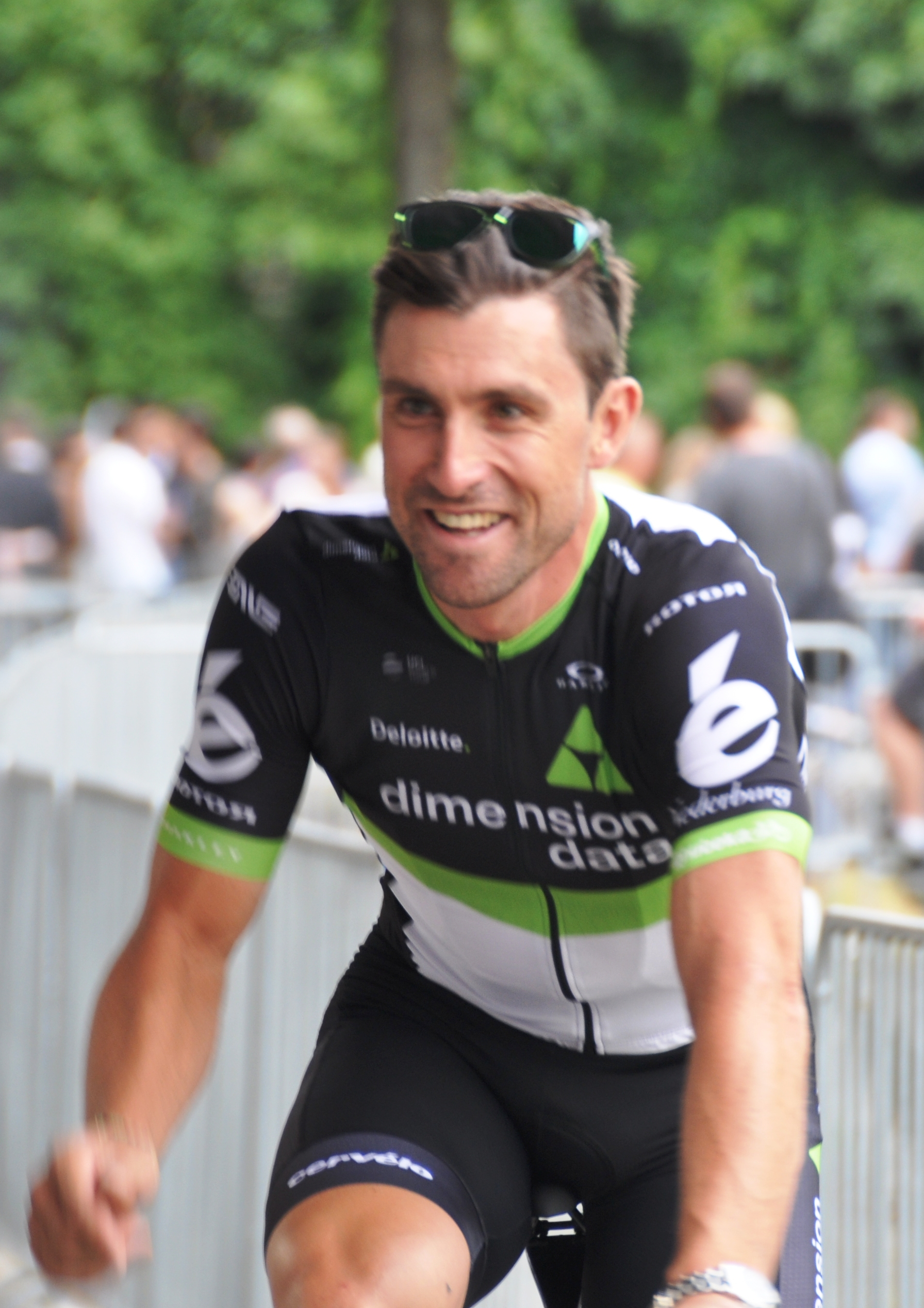
- Eisel, Düsseldorf, Tour de France, 2017.

Personal information
- Full name: Bernhard Eisel
- Nickname: Bernie
- Born: 17 February 1981 (age 45) Voitsberg, Austria
- Height: 1.83 m (6 ft 0 in)
- Weight: 78 kg (172 lb)

Cycling career
- Sport: Cycling
- Current team: Retired
- Discipline: Road
- Role: Rider
- Rider type: Classics specialist Road captain

Amateur teams
- -: Rinascita Ormelle
- -: Gli Amici Piave

Professional teams
- 2001–2002: Mapei–Quick-Step
- 2003–2006: FDJeux.com
- 2007–2011: T-Mobile Team
- 2012–2015: Team Sky
- 2016–2019: Team Dimension Data

Major wins
- Grand Tours Vuelta a España 1 TTT stage (2010) One-day races and Classics Gent–Wevelgem (2010) Paris–Bourges (2008)

Bernhard Eisel (born 17 February 1981) is an Austrian former professional road bicycle racer, who rode professionally between 2001 and 2019 for the Mapei–Quick-Step, Française des Jeux, HTC–Highroad, Team Sky and Team Dimension Data teams. Following his retirement, he worked as an analyst and presenter for Eurosport and the Global Cycling Network (GCN), before joining Bora–Hansgrohe as a directeur sportif in 2022.

== Career ==
Born in Voitsberg, Eisel won his first race when he was 11 years old, since then he has won many races. When he was 17, he moved to Italy to race for the team Rinascita Ormelle, based in Treviso. After that he moved to Gli Amici Piave, the team of Moreno Argentin. In 2001 he joined the team Mapei–Quick-Step and became a professional cyclist, from 2003 on he joined FDJeux.com.

In 2007, Eisel changed to T-Mobile Team. Eisel enjoyed a successful first season with his main victory coming on Stage 2 of the Volta ao Algarve. Eisel established himself as the right-hand man of sprinter and teammate Mark Cavendish, protecting him throughout the flats and mountain stages and forming part of the HTC lead out train that saw Cavendish take many notable victories in the Tour de France and other races. Eisel also had opportunities to ride for himself, mainly in the classics. He won Paris–Bourges in 2008 and Gent–Wevelgem in 2010, and in 2011, Eisel recorded his best placing in a monument by finishing seventh in Paris–Roubaix. Eisel was appointed as a member of the inaugural UCI Athletes' Commission in 2011.

Following the announcement that HTC–Highroad would fold at the end of 2011, Eisel joined Mark Cavendish in moving to Team Sky. After Cavendish announced he would cut his three-year deal with the team short to move to Omega Pharma–Quick-Step, Eisel announced he would stay with Team Sky until the end of the 2015 season.

On 28 September 2015, Sky announced that Eisel would be among the riders leaving the team at the end of the year, following four seasons with the team. The following day it was announced that he had joined Cavendish (and Mark Renshaw, their former teammate at HTC) in signing for MTN–Qhubeka – to be renamed as Team Dimension Data.

On 14 January 2020 he announced his retirement from professional racing. Shortly afterwards he took up a role as a presenter, reporter and commentator for Eurosport and Global Cycling Network (GCN). In November 2021 Bora–Hansgrohe announced that Eisel would join them as a directeur sportif from the 2022 season.

== Major results ==
1999
5th Road race, UCI Junior Road World Championships
2002
1st Radclassic-Gleisdorf
2nd Overall Paris–Corrèze
4th Overall GP Erik Breukink
2003 (2 pro wins)
1st Stage 4 Tour du Limousin
3rd Overall GP Erik Breukink

1st Stage 2

7th Overall Circuit Franco-Belge
2004
1st Stage 3 Criterium des Espoirs
1st Bad Ischl
5th Scheldeprijs
7th Overall Tour de Picardie
2005 (4)
Volta ao Algarve

1st Points classification
1st Stages 1 & 4

1st Stage 1 Tour de Suisse
2nd Overall Grande Prémio Internacional Costa Azul

1st Points classification
1st Stage 4

2006 (3)
1st Stage 4 Tour of Qatar
1st Stage 2 Volta ao Algarve
1st Grazer Altstadt Kriterium
1st Mayrhofen Europa-Kriterium
2nd Overall Three Days of De Panne

1st Points classification
1st Stage 2a

2nd Overall Grande Prémio Internacional Costa Azul
5th Paris–Roubaix
7th Gent–Wevelgem
2007 (3)
1st Lancaster Classic
1st Reading Classic
1st Stage 2 Volta ao Algarve
1st Linz criterium
3rd Philadelphia International Championship
4th Overall Tour of Qatar
8th Trofeo Palma
2008 (2)
1st Paris–Bourges
1st Stage 5 Volta ao Algarve
3rd Reading Classic
4th Philadelphia International Championship
6th E3 Prijs Vlaanderen
9th Lancaster Classic
2009 (1)
1st Stage 2 Tour de Suisse
1st Welser Sparkassen Innenstadt-Kriterium
2nd Kuurne–Brussels–Kuurne
3rd Road race, National Road Championships
9th Scheldeprijs
2010 (1)
1st Gent–Wevelgem
1st Stage 1 (TTT) Vuelta a España
7th Paris–Bourges
8th Omloop Het Nieuwsblad
9th Paris–Tours
2011
7th Paris–Roubaix
7th Gent–Wevelgem
8th Overall Tour of Qatar
2012
3rd E3 Harelbeke
2013
5th Overall Tour of Qatar
7th Gent–Wevelgem
10th Milan–San Remo
2014
3rd Road race, National Road Championships
2017
1st Mountains classification, Arctic Race of Norway

=== Grand Tour general classification results timeline ===
Grand Tour	2003	2004	2005	2006	2007	2008	2009	2010	2011	2012	2013	2014	2015	2016	2017
Giro d'Italia	63	—	—	—	—	—	—	—	—	152	—	138	143	—	—
Tour de France	—	131	143	107	121	144	150	155	160	146	—	126	—	171	153
Vuelta a España	—	—	DNF	DNF	—	—	—	DNF	—	—	—	—	—	—	—

=== Classics results timeline ===
Monument	2003	2004	2005	2006	2007	2008	2009	2010	2011	2012	2013	2014	2015	2016	2017	2018	2019
Milan–San Remo	12	DNF	DNF	23	34	107	DNF	44	47	DNF	10	65	DNF	—	185	—	128
Tour of Flanders	14	103	13	15	86	11	72	16	14	54	DNF	60	99	DNF	104	—	117
Paris–Roubaix	22	35	49	5	65	17	47	38	7	86	12	13	71	44	36	—	66
Liège–Bastogne–Liège	Did not contest during career																
Giro di Lombardia	Did not contest during career																
Classic	2003	2004	2005	2006	2007	2008	2009	2010	2011	2012	2013	2014	2015	2016	2017	2018	2019
Omloop Het Nieuwsblad	18	—	—	—	—	132	121	8	95	23	64	81	71	—	—	DNF	—
Kuurne–Brussels–Kuurne	DNF	35	—	—	DNF	DNF	2	—	—	113	—	45	83	—	—	DNF	—
E3 Saxo Bank Classic	35	—	16	64	73	6	11	—	—	3	36	54	86	—	DNF	—	DNF
Gent–Wevelgem	DNF	DNF	DNF	7	26	160	DNF	1	7	129	7	24	DNF	—	76	—	DNF
Scheldeprijs	—	5	—	—	51	—	9	85	141	62	119	109	13	121	40	—	—
Paris–Tours	55	—	—	—	—	DNF	44	9	—	—	—	—	—	43	106	DNF	DNF

Legend
—	Did not compete
DNF	Did not finish
