= Roger Hammond (cyclist) =

British cyclist

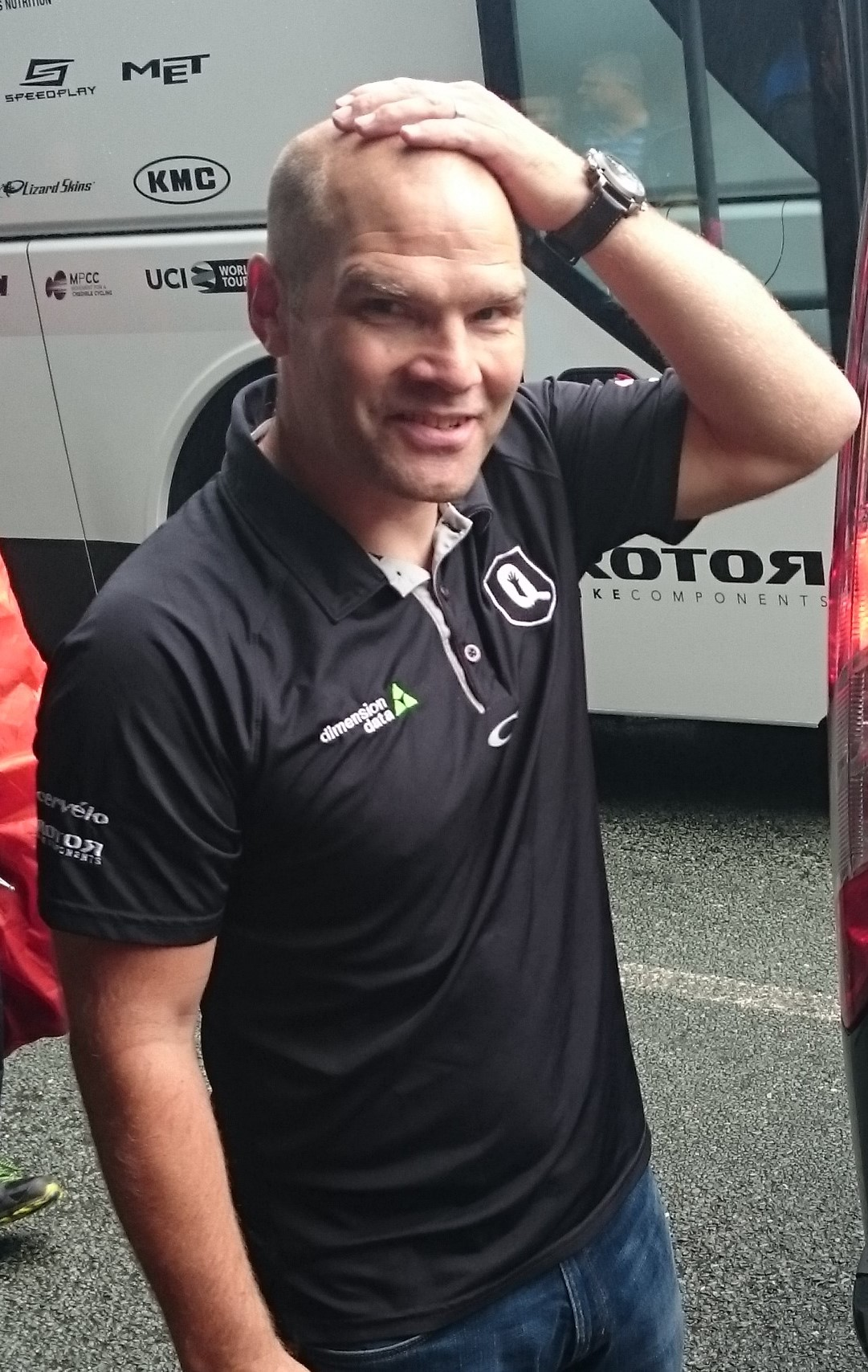
- Hammond at the 2016 Tour of Britain

Personal information
- Full name: Roger Hammond
- Born: 30 January 1974 (age 52) Oxford
- Height: 1.74 m (5 ft 9 in)
- Weight: 74 kg (163 lb; 11.7 st)

Cycling career
- Sport: Cycling
- Current team: Netcompany–Ineos
- Disciplines: Road and Cyclo-cross
- Role: Sports Director; Rider (retired)
- Rider type: Classics Specialist

Professional teams
- 1998–2004: Palmans–Ideal
- 2005–2006: Discovery Channel
- 2007–2008: T-Mobile Team
- 2009–2010: Cervélo TestTeam
- 2011: Garmin–Cervélo

Managerial teams
- 2013–2016, 2019: Madison Genesis
- 2016–2018: Team Dimension Data
- 2020–2021: Bahrain–McLaren
- 2021–2023: INEOS Grenadiers
- 2024-2025: Bora–Hansgrohe
- 2026-present: Unibet Rose Rockets

Major wins
- Cyclo-cross National Championships (1994, 2000–2004, 2006, 2008) Road One-Day Races and Classics National Road Race Championships (2003, 2004)

Roger Hammond (born 30 January 1974) is a male English retired bicycle racer, specialising in cyclo-cross and road cycling.

== Education ==
Hammond grew up in Chalfont St Peter in Buckinghamshire and attended Dr Challoner's Grammar School as a teenager. While still at school he won the 1992 world junior cyclo-cross championship in Leeds, but elected to concentrate on his university studies before pursuing a cycling career.

== Cycling career ==
Hammond represented England in the road race event, at the 1998 Commonwealth Games in Kuala Lumpur, Malaysia. He repeated this achievement four years later at the 2002 Commonwealth Games.

He was the British road champion in 2003 and 2004. He rode for Discovery Channel in 2005–2006, for Team High Road in 2007–2008, for Cervélo TestTeam in 2009–2010, and Garmin–Cervélo in 2011. Hammond rode for the Great Britain team in the 2005 and 2006 Tour of Britain. During his pro career he performed well in the spring classics including a 3rd place finish on the 2004 edition of Paris-Roubaix which followed on from his 3rd place finish in the 2004 edition of Dwars door Vlaanderen. In the 2005 running of Dwars door Vlaanderen he went one better finishing 2nd. In 2007 Hammond matched his best classic result coming 2nd at Gent–Wevelgem.

Hammond is also an 8 times British cyclo-cross champion.

== Post cycling ==
In July 2012 Roger Hammond was announced as the team manager of the newly formed Madison-Genesis team. In November 2015 he announced that he would join Team Dimension Data as a sports director for the 2016 season, initially combining the position with his Madison-Genesis role. He returned to Madison-Genesis for the team's last season in 2019.

Hammond was in December 2019 named as performance director for the Bahrain-McLaren team for the 2020 season.

He joined the Ineos Grenadiers in October 2021 as head of racing.

Hammond has also worked as a pundit for ITV4, providing analysis of the Vuelta a España.

After a successful stint at INEOS (that was ended by a significant upheaval in the management structure), Hammond moved to Red Bull BORA Hansgrohe as an associate sports director from May 2024.

At the end of 2025 it was announced that Hammond was stepping away from the world tour to help the promising Unibet Rose Rockets project, where he would once again work with Wout Poels after working together at Team Bahrain Victorious in 2020 and 2021 seasons.

== Major results ==
=== Cyclo-cross ===
1991–1992
1st UCI World Junior Championships
1993–1994
1st National Championships
1999–2000
1st National Championships
2000–2001
1st National Championships
2001–2002
1st National Championships
National Trophy Series

1st Leicestershire
1st London

2002–2003
1st National Championships
2003–2004
1st National Championships
National Trophy Series

1st Leicestershire

2005–2006
1st National Championships
2007–2008
1st National Championships
2008–2009
3rd National Championships

=== Road ===
1998
2nd Road race, National Road Championships
2000
1st Archer Grand Prix
1st Grand Prix Bodson
2nd Grand Prix Fayt-Le-Franc
3rd Schaal Sels
10th Gent–Wevelgem
2001
1st Textielprijs Vichte
2nd Grand Prix Pino Cerami
3rd Veenendaal–Veenendaal
4th Le Samyn
5th Schaal Sels
2002
1st Tour Beneden-Maas
1st Grote 1-MeiPrijs
1st Sprints classification, Tour of Rhodes
4th Road race, National Road Championships
5th Schaal Sels
2003
1st Road race, National Road Championships
1st Overall Uniqa Classic

1st Points classification
1st Stage 2

2nd GP Jef Scherens Leuven
2nd Stage 5 Étoile de Bessèges
8th Gent–Wevelgem
8th Paris–Bourges
2004
1st Road race, National Road Championships
3rd Paris–Roubaix
3rd Dwars door Vlaanderen
3rd Grand Prix Rudy Dhaenens
6th Le Samyn
6th Gent–Wevelgem
7th Road race, Olympic Games
2005
1st Stage 2 Tour of Britain
2nd Dwars door Vlaanderen
2nd Nationale Sluitingsprijs
2006
1st Stage 2 Tour of Britain
2nd Road race, National Road Championships
2007
2nd Gent–Wevelgem
2008
10th Gent–Wevelgem
2009
3rd Overall Tour of Qatar

1st Stage 2

3rd Overall Tour of Denmark
3rd Overall Tour de l'Eurométropole
4th Paris–Bourges
5th Road race, National Road Championships
2010
4th Paris–Roubaix
7th Tour of Flanders

==== Classic results timeline ====
Monument	1998	1999	2000	2001	2002	2003	2004	2005	2006	2007	2008	2009	2010	2011
Milan–San Remo	—	—	—	—	—	—	—	21	28	42	35	92	DNF	147
Tour of Flanders	—	—	73	71	DNF	48	30	52	DNF	DNF	31	13	7	108
Paris–Roubaix	—	—	—	—	—	17	3	OTL	24	7	23	14	4	DNF
Liège–Bastogne–Liège	—	—	—	DNF	—	DNF	—	—	—	—	—	—	—	—
Giro di Lombardia	did not contest during his career													
Classic	1998	1999	2000	2001	2002	2003	2004	2005	2006	2007	2008	2009	2010	2011
Omloop Het Nieuwsblad	—	DNF	34	29	DNF	DNF	—	59	16	43	45	61	19	74
Kuurne–Brussels–Kuurne	17	28	31	21	—	—	13	DNF	53	13	51	97	DNF	—
Dwars door Vlaanderen	23	—	—	25	22	17	3	2	16	15	44	11	13	74
E3 Prijs Vlaanderen	DNF	DNF	—	—	73	16	8	25	8	26	DNF	83	42	91
Gent–Wevelgem	DNF	—	10	22	DNF	8	6	DNF	—	2	10	74	OTL	154

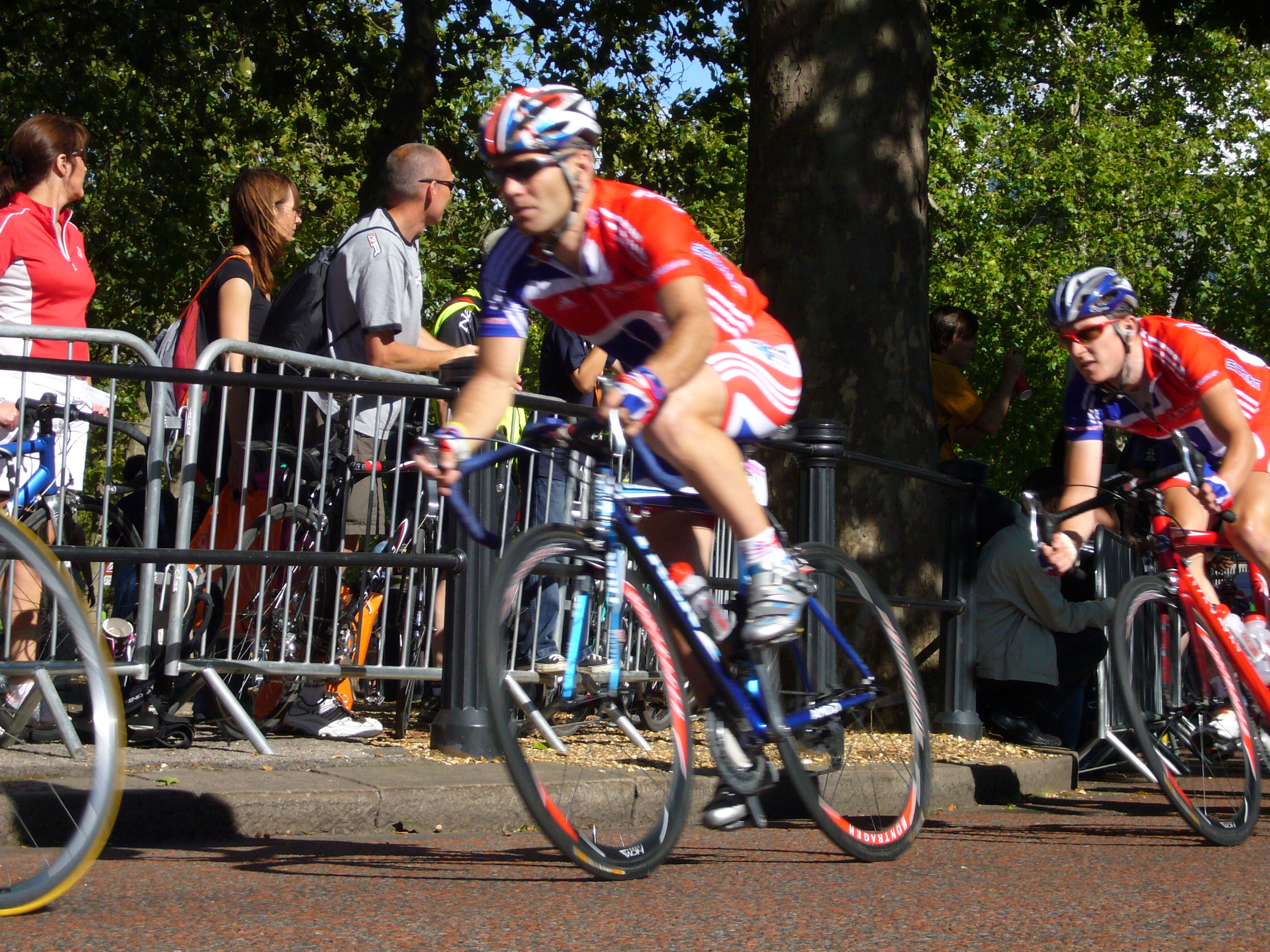
Roger Hammond in the 2006 Tour of Britain in London
