= Mathew Hayman =

Australian road bicycle racer

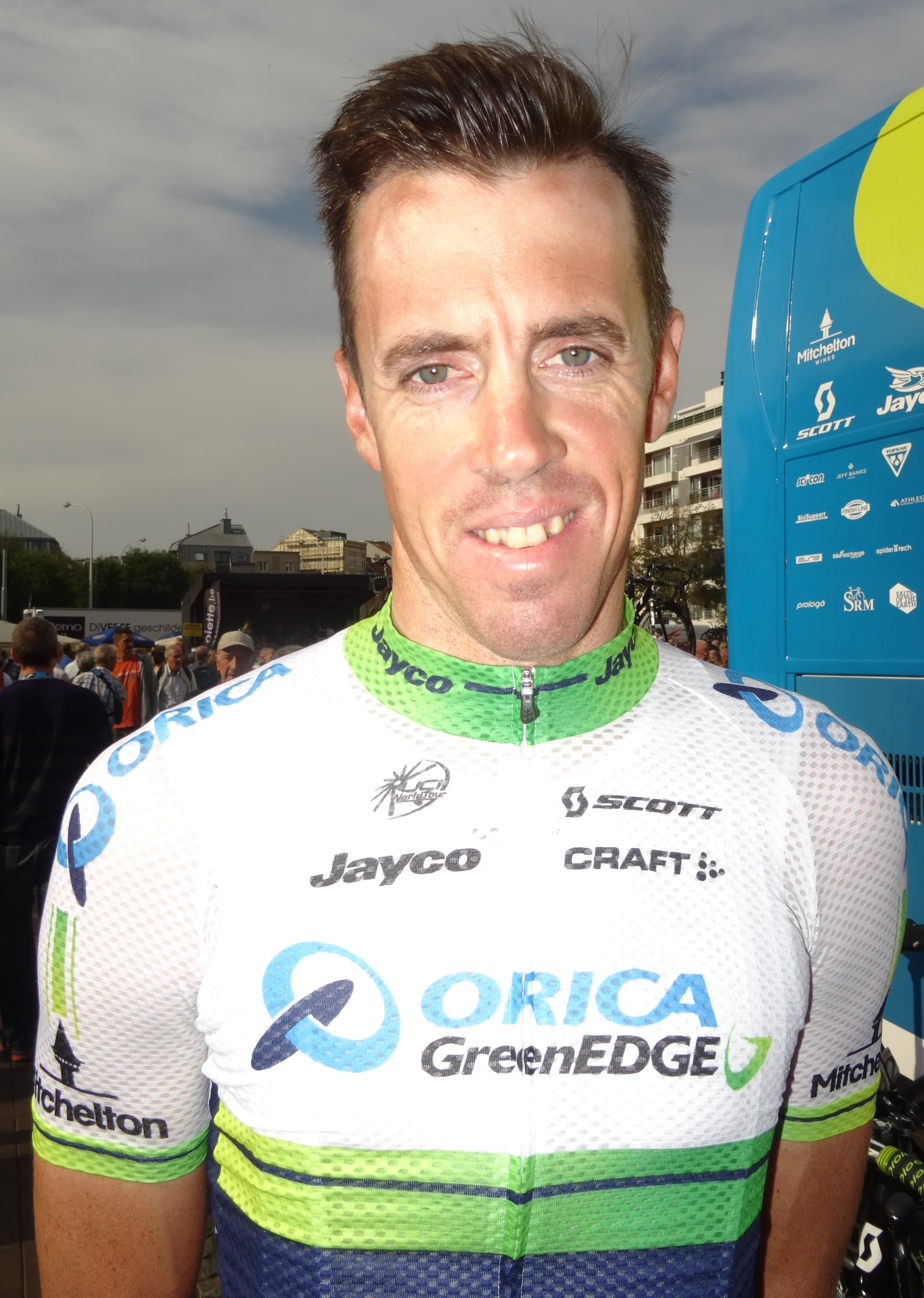
- Hayman at the 2014 Tour de l'Eurométropole

Personal information
- Full name: Mathew Hayman
- Nicknames: Mat; Matty
- Born: 20 April 1978 (age 48) Camperdown, New South Wales, Australia
- Height: 1.90 m (6 ft 3 in)
- Weight: 78 kg (172 lb; 12 st 4 lb)

Cycling career
- Sport: Cycling
- Current team: Team Jayco–AlUla
- Discipline: Road
- Role: Directeur sportif; Rider (former)
- Rider type: Super-Domestique; Road Captain; Classics specialist

Professional teams
- 2000–2009: Rabobank
- 2010–2013: Team Sky
- 2014–2019: Orica–GreenEDGE

Managerial team
- 2019–: Mitchelton–Scott

Major wins
- One-day races and Classics Paris–Roubaix (2016)
Medal record
Representing Australia
Men's Road race
Commonwealth Games
| Gold medal – first place | 2006 Melbourne | Road Race |

Mathew Hayman (born 20 April 1978) is an Australian former professional road bicycle racer, who rode professionally between 2000 and 2019 for the Rabobank, Team Sky and Mitchelton–Scott teams. During his career, Hayman was an experienced and respected domestique, as he typically took on a supporting role within his team. Hayman was also a specialist in the cobbled classics, and was the winner of Paris–Roubaix in 2016. Following his retirement from racing after the 2019 Tour Down Under, Hayman remained with the Mitchelton–Scott team as a part-time directeur sportif alongside a "special projects" position.

== Personal life ==
Hayman was born in western Sydney, but the family was living near Goulburn in country New South Wales when he became interested in cycling, largely due to his older brother. He started racing in Canberra, and, following his brother, moved to Europe to further a potential cycling career in 1997. He raced as an amateur with Rabobank's under-23 team, based in The Netherlands. In 2006 he married Kym Shirley, an Australian professional cyclist. The couple has a son, born in 2011, and twins born in 2017.

== Career ==
Hayman turned professional in 2000 with Rabobank, after three years racing as an amateur in Europe. He completed his first Paris–Roubaix the same year. He stayed with Rabobank for ten years, achieving a number of good results during that time. Hayman has refused to discuss Dr Geert Leinders when asked about his time at Rabobank. Riding for Australia in the 2006 Commonwealth Games in Melbourne as a domestique in support of Allan Davis, it was Hayman who came away with the gold medal in the road race.

At the end of 2009 Hayman left Rabobank for the challenge of helping to form a new professional cycling team, then known as Team Sky. Hayman left Team Sky at the end of the 2013 season, and joined Orica–GreenEDGE for the 2014 season.

On 10 April 2016, he won Paris–Roubaix, the eighth professional victory of his career and his 15th time participating in Paris-Roubaix. He was part of a breakaway of 16 riders that escaped from the peloton in the early stages of the race, which was later joined by a group which was formed after the peloton broke up following a crash 115 km from the finish. In the closing stages Hayman managed to close the gap on a select group of riders attacking from the lead group, and in the final sprint at Roubaix Velodrome, he beat Tom Boonen, Ian Stannard, Sep Vanmarcke and Edvald Boasson Hagen. His first reaction was one of disbelief: "I can’t believe it [...] This is my favorite race, it's a race I dream of every year. This year I didn’t even dare to dream."

On 18 September 2018 Hayman announced that he intended to retire after the 2019 Tour Down Under.

== Major results ==
1996
2nd Time trial, UCI Road World Junior Championships
2nd Time trial, National Junior Road Championships
1999
1st Overall Le Triptyque des Monts et Châteaux
2nd Overall Olympia's Tour

1st Stage 3b (TTT)

3rd Omloop der Kempen
2000
5th Overall Sparkassen Giro Bochum
6th Overall Guldensporentweedaagse
2001
1st Overall Challenge Mallorca

1st Sprints classification
1st Stage 5

1st Trofeo Soller
6th Overall Circuit Franco-Belge
7th Milano–Torino
2002
6th Henk Vos Memorial
9th Overall Ster Elektrotoer
10th Overall Circuit Franco-Belge
2003
10th Gent–Wevelgem
2004
4th Tour de Rijke
10th Overall Sachsen Tour
10th Schaal Sels-Merksem
2005
1st Overall Sachsen Tour
8th Overall Three Days of De Panne
8th Overall Circuit Franco-Belge
8th Dwars door Vlaanderen
10th Trofeo Calvià
2006
1st Road race, Commonwealth Games
2nd Profronde van Fryslan
3rd Overall Oddset-Rundfahrt
2007
4th Dwars door Vlaanderen
5th Tour de Rijke
7th Profronde van Fryslan
9th Overall Tour of Qatar
2008
10th Ronde van het Groene Hart
2009
4th Gent–Wevelgem
7th Trofeo Inca
8th Dwars door Vlaanderen
8th Memorial Rik Van Steenbergen
10th Tour de Rijke
2010
5th Dwars door Vlaanderen
2011
1st Paris–Bourges
3rd Omloop Het Nieuwsblad
4th Dwars door Vlaanderen
6th Overall Circuit Franco-Belge
10th Paris–Roubaix
2012
8th Paris–Roubaix
2013
3rd Dwars door Vlaanderen
2016
1st Paris–Roubaix

=== Grand Tour general classification results timeline ===
| Grand Tour | 2002 | 2003 | 2004 | 2005 | 2006 | 2007 | 2008 | 2009 | 2010 | 2011 | 2012 | 2013 | 2014 | 2015 | 2016 | 2017 | 2018 |
|---|---|---|---|---|---|---|---|---|---|---|---|---|---|---|---|---|---|
| Giro d'Italia | 91 | — | — | — | 136 | — | DNF | — | 105 | — | — | — | — | — | — | — | — |
| Tour de France | — | — | — | — | — | — | — | — | — | — | — | — | DNF | — | 135 | 151 | 108 |
| Vuelta a España | — | 137 | — | DNF | — | — | — | — | — | — | — | — | — | 130 | — | — | — |

=== Classics results timeline ===
| Monument | 2000 | 2001 | 2002 | 2003 | 2004 | 2005 | 2006 | 2007 | 2008 | 2009 | 2010 | 2011 | 2012 | 2013 | 2014 | 2015 | 2016 | 2017 | 2018 |
|---|---|---|---|---|---|---|---|---|---|---|---|---|---|---|---|---|---|---|---|
| Milan–San Remo | — | — | — | — | 154 | — | 121 | 86 | — | 93 | 129 | — | DNF | — | DNF | 62 | — | 137 | — |
| Tour of Flanders | — | — | 70 | 82 | — | 47 | 90 | 68 | — | 60 | 13 | 21 | 79 | DNF | 51 | 39 | — | 91 | 83 |
| Paris–Roubaix | 65 | 49 | HD | 26 | — | 78 | 23 | — | 113 | 21 | 24 | 10 | 8 | 52 | 51 | 76 | 1 | 11 | 22 |
| Liège–Bastogne–Liège | — | — | — | — | — | — | — | — | — | — | — | — | — | — | — | 141 | — | — | — |
| Giro di Lombardia | Did not contest during his career | | | | | | | | | | | | | | | | | | |
| Classic | 2000 | 2001 | 2002 | 2003 | 2004 | 2005 | 2006 | 2007 | 2008 | 2009 | 2010 | 2011 | 2012 | 2013 | 2014 | 2015 | 2016 | 2017 | 2018 |
| Omloop Het Nieuwsblad | — | DNF | 22 | DNF | — | 32 | 22 | 15 | 60 | 27 | 100 | 3 | 24 | — | — | — | DNF | 50 | DNF |
| Kuurne–Brussels–Kuurne | 63 | 45 | — | — | 27 | — | 25 | 20 | 93 | — | 26 | 46 | 92 | — | — | — | — | 66 | 33 |
| Dwars door Vlaanderen | — | — | 26 | 36 | 60 | 8 | — | 4 | 46 | 8 | 5 | 4 | — | — | 55 | — | — | 27 | 100 |
| E3 Harelbeke | — | — | — | 36 | — | 22 | — | DNF | — | DNF | — | — | — | 28 | DNF | 74 | — | 37 | 47 |
| Gent–Wevelgem | 40 | 50 | 41 | 10 | — | 25 | — | — | 80 | 4 | 27 | 125 | 68 | 36 | — | 18 | — | 98 | 97 |
| Scheldeprijs | — | — | — | — | — | — | 17 | — | 92 | — | 153 | 31 | 38 | 107 | — | — | — | — | — |
| Amstel Gold Race | — | — | — | — | — | — | — | — | — | — | 82 | 96 | 108 | 90 | DNF | DNF | 84 | 124 | — |
| La Flèche Wallonne | — | — | — | — | — | — | — | — | — | — | — | — | — | — | — | — | 144 | — | — |
| Paris–Tours | — | — | 58 | 82 | 40 | 36 | 14 | 89 | — | 119 | — | 12 | — | — | — | — | 131 | — | — |
| Milano–Torino | — | 7 | 125 | — | 99 | — | — | — | — | — | — | — | — | — | — | — | — | — | — |

Legend
| — | Did not compete |
| HD | Hors delai (out of time limit) |
| DNF | Did not finish |
