= Tom Boonen =

Belgian road bicycle racer (born 1980)

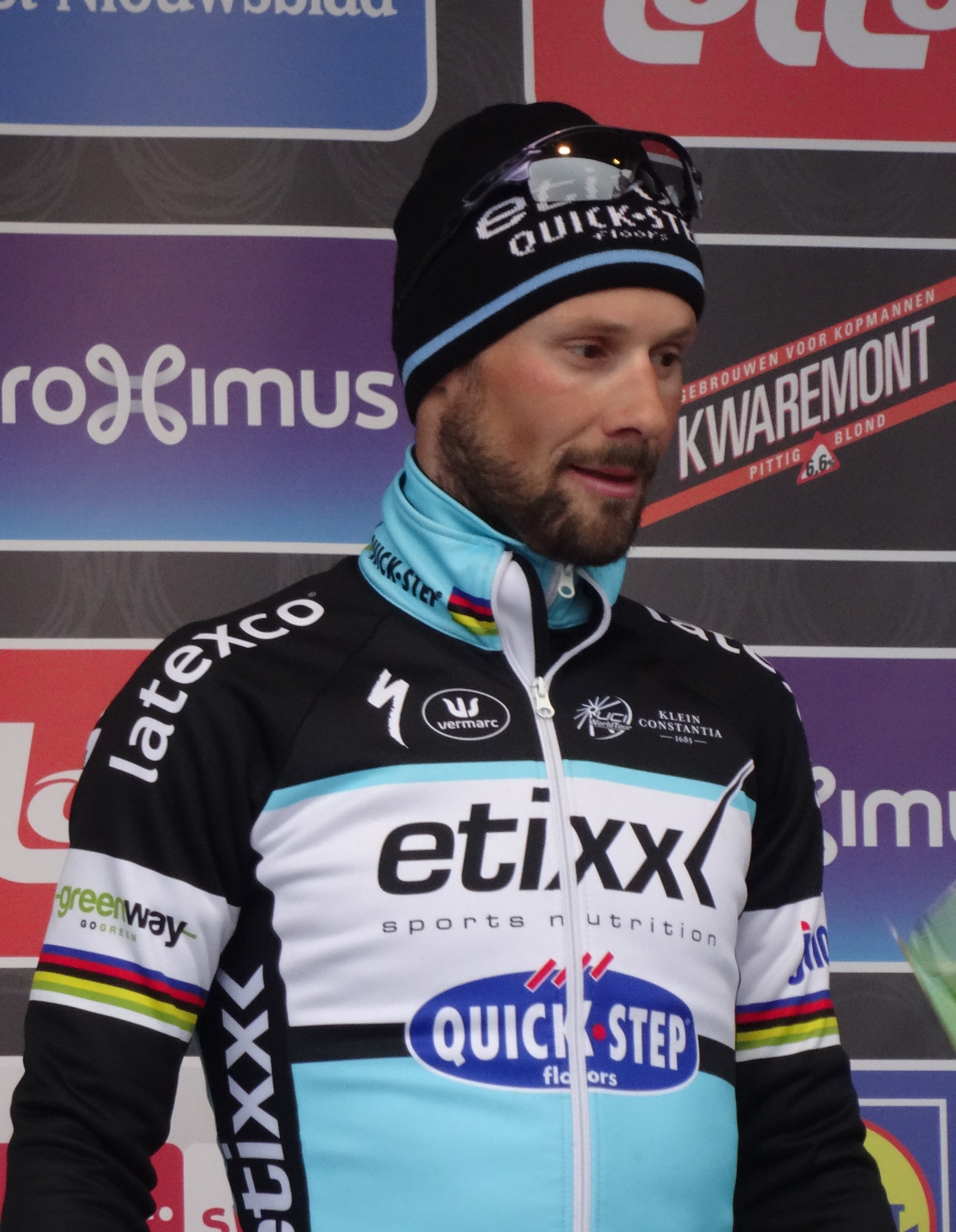
- Boonen at the 2015 Omloop Het Nieuwsblad

Personal information
- Full name: Tom Boonen
- Nicknames: Tommeke; Tornado Tom
- Born: 15 October 1980 (age 46) Mol, Belgium
- Height: 1.92 m (6 ft 3 1/2 in)
- Weight: 82 kg (181 lb; 12 st 13 lb)

Cycling career
- Sport: Cycling
- Current team: Retired
- Discipline: Road
- Role: Rider
- Rider type: Classics specialist Sprinter

Professional teams
- 2002: U.S. Postal Service
- 2003–2017: Quick-Step–Davitamon

Major wins
- Grand Tours Tour de France Points classification (2007) 6 individual stages (2004, 2005, 2007) Vuelta a España 2 individual stages (2008) Stage races Tour of Belgium (2005) Tour de Picardie (2004) Tour of Qatar (2006, 2008, 2009, 2012) World Ports Classic (2012) One-day races and Classics World Road Race Championships (2005) National Road Race Championships (2009, 2012) Tour of Flanders (2005, 2006, 2012) Paris–Roubaix (2005, 2008, 2009, 2012) E3 Harelbeke (2004, 2005, 2006, 2007, 2012) Gent–Wevelgem (2004, 2011, 2012) Scheldeprijs (2004, 2006) Kuurne–Brussels–Kuurne (2007, 2009, 2014) Dwars door Vlaanderen (2007) Paris–Brussels (2012, 2016) Münsterland Giro (2015) London–Surrey Classic (2016) Other Vélo d'Or (2005)
Medal record
Men's road bicycle racing
Representing Belgium
World Championships
Gold medal – first place	2005 Madrid	Road Race
Bronze medal – third place	2016 Doha	Road Race
Representing Omega Pharma–Quick-Step (2012, 2014) Etixx–Quick-Step (2015)
World Championships
Gold medal – first place	2012 Valkenburg	Team Time Trial
Silver medal – second place	2015 Richmond	Team Time Trial
Bronze medal – third place	2014 Ponferrada	Team Time Trial

Tom Boonen (Dutch pronunciation: [ˈtɔm ˈboːnə(n)]; born 15 October 1980) is a Belgian former road bicycle racer, who competed as a professional between 2002 and 2017 for the U.S. Postal Service and Quick-Step Floors teams and a professional racing driver who currently competes in Belcar, having previously competed in the NASCAR Whelen Euro Series. Boonen won the 2005 UCI World Road Race Championships, and was a single-day road specialist with a strong finishing sprint. He won the cycling monuments Paris–Roubaix four times and the Tour of Flanders three times, among many other prestigious victories, such as prevailing five times in the E3 Harelbeke, winning six stages of the Tour de France and winning the overall title of the Tour of Qatar four times.

== Career ==
=== Early years ===
At the start of 2002 Boonen, rode for U.S. Postal Service, finishing third in Paris–Roubaix after an early breakaway. Fellow Belgian Johan Museeuw had escaped to a solo victory. Team captain George Hincapie crashed in a slippery section of the course leaving Boonen to ride for himself. Boonen's performance led Museeuw – his childhood hero – to declare Boonen his successor.

Boonen said US Postal did not give him enough chances to ride for himself. Towards the end of the year he said he would leave, despite being under contract, and joined Quick-Step–Davitamon at the start of 2003. The 2003 season, however, did not go well, with lacklustre performance due to fatigue and knee injury. Museeuw was team leader for the spring classics.

During the 2004 season, Boonen won the E3 Prijs Vlaanderen, Gent–Wevelgem and the Scheldeprijs. He also won two stages of the Tour de France including the final stage in Paris, as Museeuw did in 1990.

=== 2005: Winning Ronde, Roubaix and Worlds ===
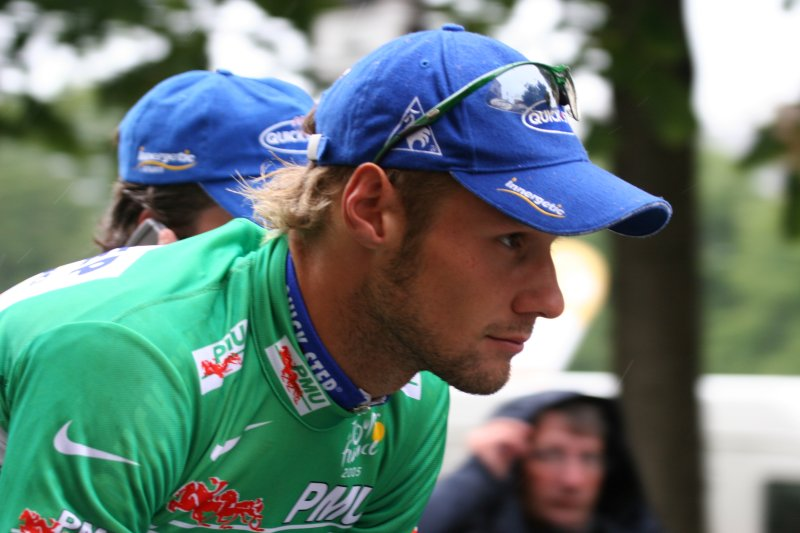
Boonen wearing the Green Jersey at the 2005 Tour de France

In 2005, Boonen won the Tour of Flanders, Paris–Roubaix and the E3 Prijs Vlaanderen, and came second in the Omloop "Het Volk" behind teammate Nick Nuyens. He was first to win the Tour of Flanders, Paris–Roubaix, and the World Cycling Championship in the same season.

In the Tour of Flanders, Boonen appeared to be the strongest sprinter in the final group. However, he attacked a few kilometers from the finish to the surprise of others and stayed away. Erik Dekker said: "I'm happy that I am near the end of my career, since with a cyclist like Boonen the spring classics will be rather boring the coming years". In Paris–Roubaix, Boonen entered the velodrome in the leading trio, and waited until the last moment before outsprinting George Hincapie and the Spaniard, Juan Antonio Flecha.

In the Tour de France, Boonen won the second and third stages, taking the lead in the points classification. He retired after stage 11 due to injuries sustained in crashes. On 25 September, Boonen became the 21st Belgian road world champion. He won the race in Madrid, after the leading six riders were caught. He outsprinted Alejandro Valverde to become the first Belgian since Museeuw, in 1996, to wear the rainbow jersey. He came second in the 2005 UCI ProTour rankings.

At the end of the year, Boonen won several awards: Kristallen Fiets (Crystal Bicycle), Vélo d'Or (Golden Bicycle), Trofee voor Sportverdienste (Trophy For Sporting Merit), Belgian Sportsman of the year and Belgian Sports Personality of the Year.

=== 2006 ===
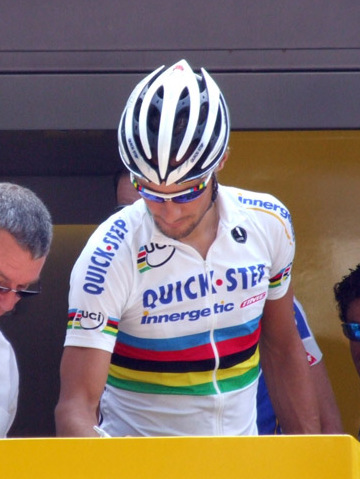
Boonen signing in at Tarbes during the 2006 Tour de France

In 2006, Boonen won the Tour of Flanders and came second in Paris–Roubaix the following week. Leif Hoste, Peter Van Petegem and Vladimir Gusev placed second to fourth at Roubaix but were disqualified for riding through a closed level-crossing before a train passed. This promoted Boonen to second, behind Fabian Cancellara.

Boonen won the second and the third stages of the Tour of Belgium. Before the Tour de France he claimed himself to be the strongest and smartest sprinter. However, he did not win a stage in the first week, beaten by Robbie McEwen and Óscar Freire. However he wore the yellow jersey for the first time, losing it in the first time trial to Sergei Honchar. Boonen abandoned the Tour during the 15th stage – 187 km from Gap to l'Alpe d'Huez – when he was unable to reach the summit of the Col du Lautaret.

Boonen won three stages of the Eneco Tour of Benelux but could not keep his title at the world championship, held on a circuit that was hillier than in Madrid 2005. Paolo Bettini won and Boonen came ninth.

=== 2007 ===
In his 2007, Boonen won five stages of the Tour of Qatar and came second in the general classification behind teammate Wilfried Cretskens. He won Kuurne–Brussels–Kuurne and E3 Prijs Vlaanderen but he didn't win one of the five cycling monuments. His best placing was third in Milan–San Remo.

Boonen won stages 6 and 12 of the Tour de France in the absence of Alessandro Petacchi and Robbie McEwen. He won the points classification in the Tour de France, the first Belgian since Eddy Planckaert in 1988 to do so.

=== 2008 ===
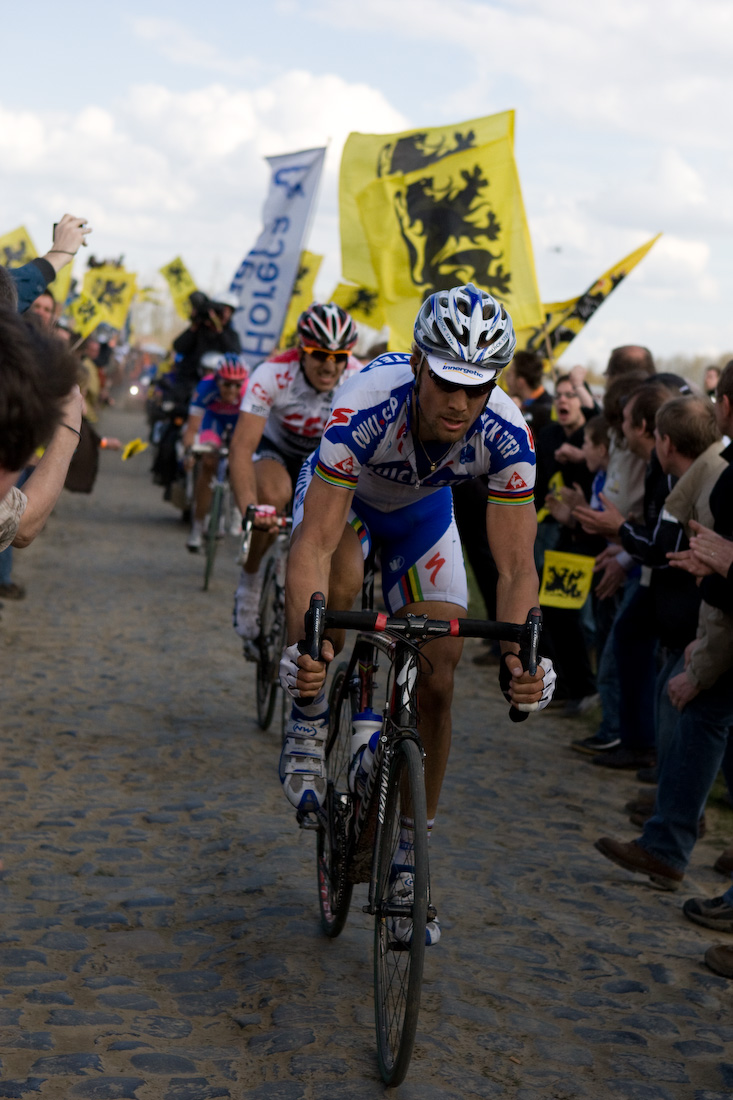
Boonen at the 2008 Paris–Roubaix

Boonen began 2008 by winning four stages and the overall and points classifications in the Tour of Qatar. In the Tour of Flanders, he took on a defensive role when his teammate Stijn Devolder escaped and won. A week later, he outsprinted Fabian Cancellara and Alessandro Ballan in the final 500m to win the Paris–Roubaix. On 10 June 2008, reports said Boonen was negotiating a team place for him and other riders at Bouygues Télécom, a French team. Its sporting director, Jean-René Bernaudeau, confirmed the report. Wilfried Cretskens and Kevin Hulsmans were named as the others involved.

Negotiations ended when Boonen tested positive for cocaine. Cocaine was not a performance-enhancing drug and Boonen faced no sanctions by the UCI or WADA. He apologized to his Quick Step manager, Patrick Lefévère at a press conference next day. Lefévère said Quick Step kept its confidence in him. But Boonen was barred from the Tour of Switzerland and the Tour de France. In February 2009, a Belgian court found him guilty of cocaine use but decided against sanctions, saying he has "been punished enough".

=== 2009 ===
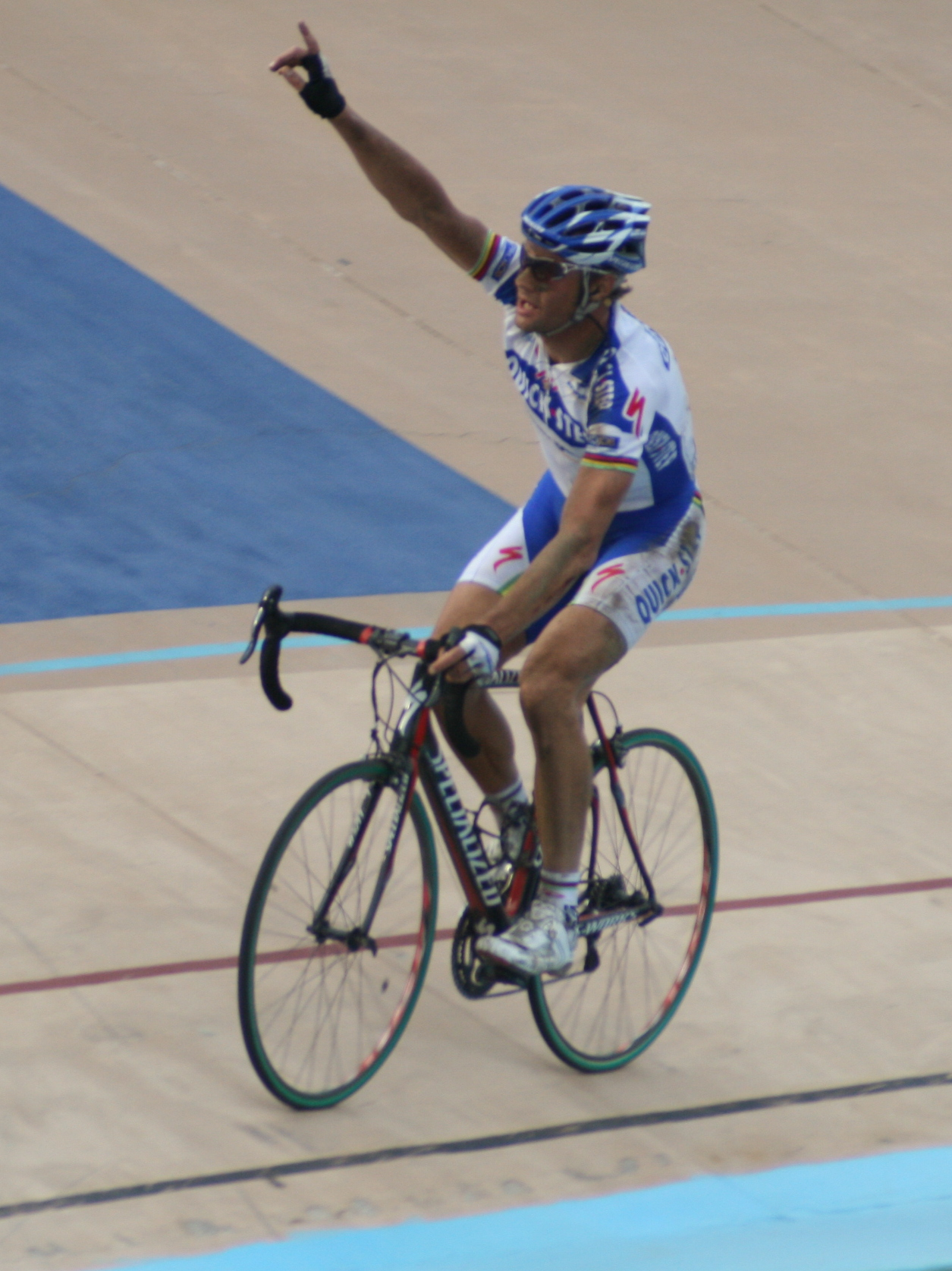
Boonen celebrating victory in the 2009 Paris–Roubaix; his third victory at the race.

Boonen began 2009 by winning a stage and the overall and points classifications in the Tour of Qatar. He also won Kuurne–Brussels–Kuurne for the second time. In the Tour of Flanders he had to take on a defensive role when his teammate Stijn Devolder escaped and won for the second time. The following week, Boonen won Paris–Roubaix for the third time in his career.

On 27 April, Boonen tested positive for cocaine for the third time (the first, in November 2007, had not previously been made public). He was suspended by his team, Quick-Step, on 9 May. He began racing again in the Critérium du Dauphiné Libéré. In June, he won the national championship. After initiating legal proceedings he was allowed to compete in the Tour de France, just one day before the start on 3 July 2009. He pulled out, due to illness on 18 July, before the 15th stage.

Boonen returned to racing in the Eneco Tour where he won the third stage by beating Tyler Farrar in the sprint. After that, he entered the Vuelta a España to prepare for the final part of the season. There, he finished second in the prologue behind Cancellara. He crashed in the seventh stage, a 30 km time trial, losing by 1m 03s and ended the day second overall behind Cancellara. He withdrew during the 13th stage, due to the lasting effects of his crash in the seventh stage.

Boonen finished his season with a second place in Paris–Tours, beaten in a sprint of three by fellow countryman and defending champion Philippe Gilbert.

=== 2010 ===
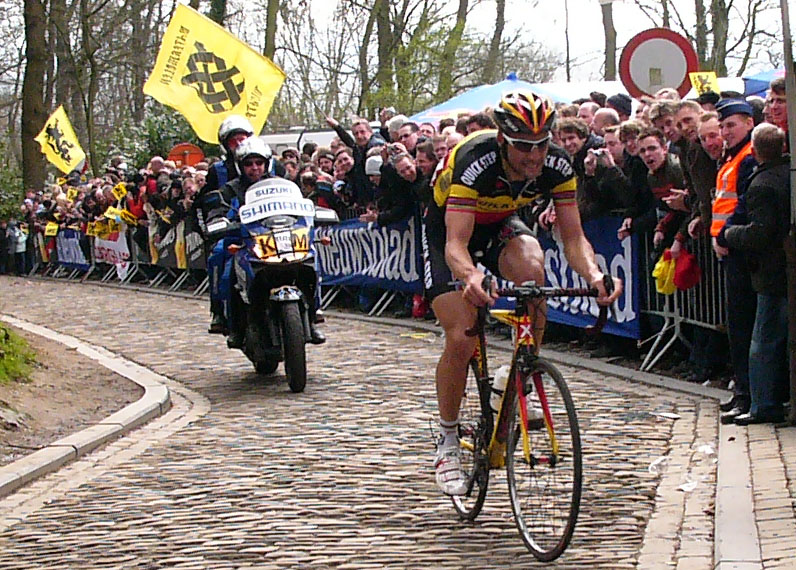
Boonen in the 2010 Tour of Flanders

Boonen became third in the Tour of Qatar, winning two stages, then won stage five of the Tour of Oman. He won the second stage of Tirreno–Adriatico, before finishing second to Óscar Freire in Milan–San Remo. Boonen came second to Fabian Cancellara in the E3 Prijs Vlaanderen – Harelbeke, a result replicated at the Tour of Flanders. He came fifth in Paris–Roubaix the following week.

Boonen missed most of the rest of the season – including the Tour de France, the Belgian and the world championships – due to tendinitis in his left knee caused by crashes at the Tour of California and the Tour de Suisse. He returned to racing in October at the Circuit Franco-Belge and Paris–Tours.

=== 2011 ===
Boonen began the season by winning the opening stage of the 2011 Tour of Qatar. He won Gent–Wevelgem, came fourth in the Tour of Flanders and dropped out of Paris–Roubaix after crashing. Boonen also crashed on stage five of the Tour de France. His injuries forced him to abandon on stage seven. Boonen fell again in the Vuelta a España, which made him miss the world championship.

=== 2012 ===
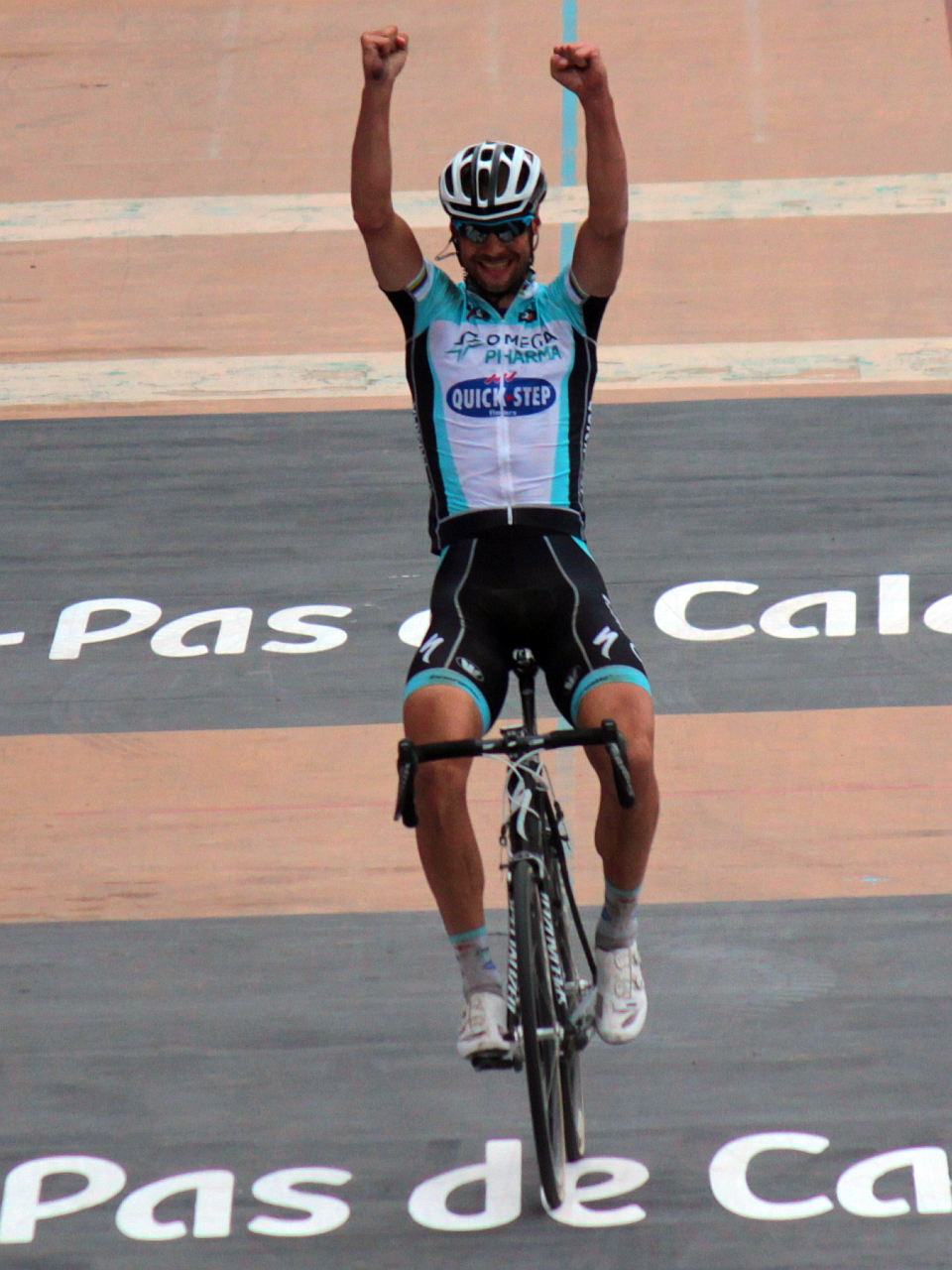
Boonen won 2012 Paris–Roubaix for the fourth time, tying the record held by Roger De Vlaeminck.

Boonen began 2012 season by winning stage seven of his first race, the Tour de San Luis. In February, he won the Tour of Qatar, winning two stages and the points classification, and finished second to Sep Vanmarcke in Omloop Het Nieuwsblad.

Boonen won the second stage of Paris–Nice. He won the E3 Harelbeke and Gent–Wevelgem two days later. He was favourite for the Tour of Flanders, which he won in a sprint against Filippo Pozzato and Alessandro Ballan. His third victory equalled those of Achiel Buysse, Fiorenzo Magni, Eric Leman and Johan Museeuw. His fourth win in Paris–Roubaix equalled Roger De Vlaeminck. Boonen was first to win the Tour of Flanders and Paris Roubaix double twice. He is also the first to win E3 Harelbeke, Gent–Wevelgem, Tour of Flanders and Paris–Roubaix in the same year.

Boonen returned to racing at the Tour of California. He won the national championship title in June, taking the tricolor jersey from Philippe Gilbert.

Boonen skipped the Tour de France to prepare for the Olympic road race, riding the shorter Tour of Poland instead. He crashed in the first stage and withdrew on the fifth with a broken rib. He recovered in time for the Olympics, and came 28th.

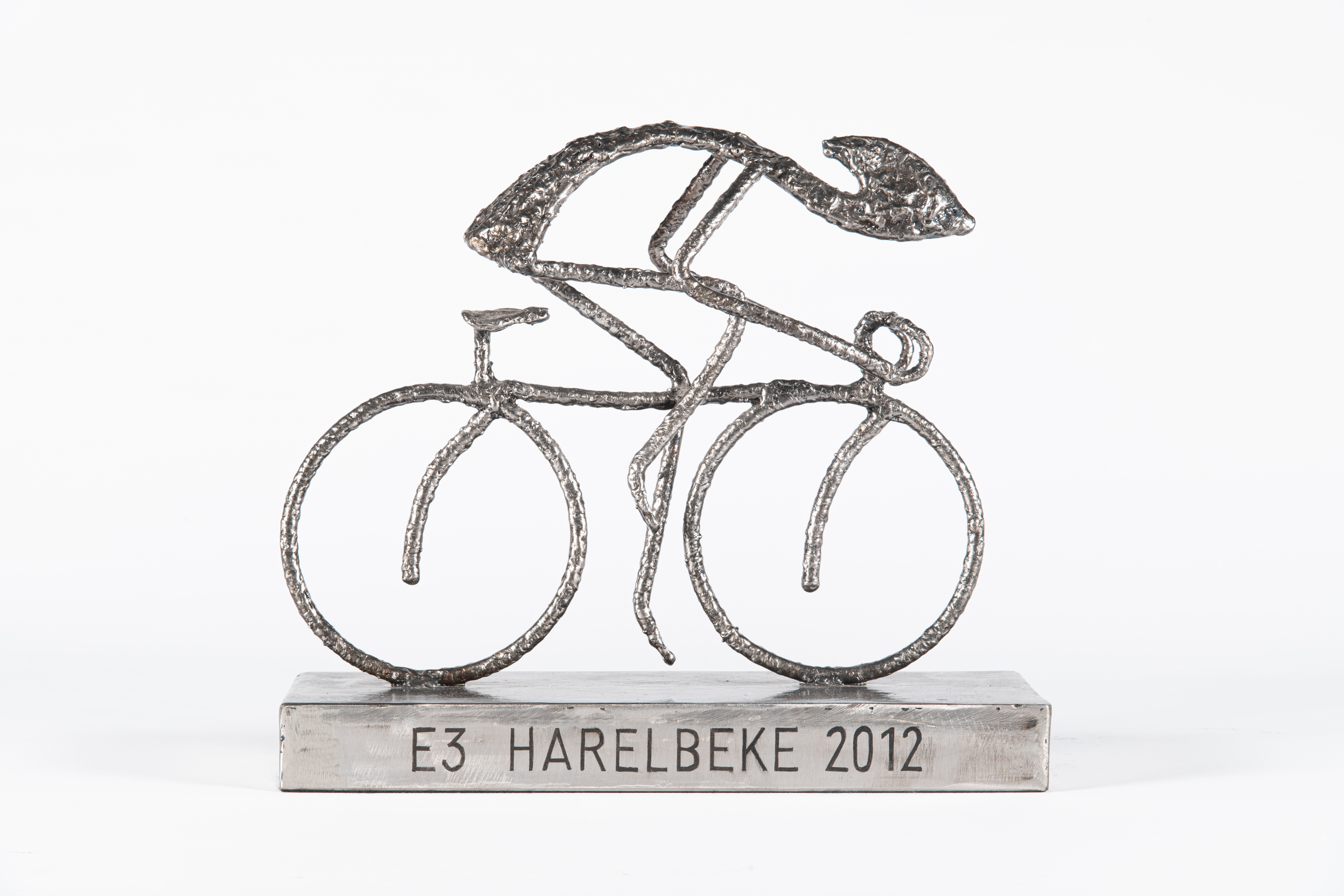
Trophy won by Tom Boonen at 2012 E3 Harelbeke (collection KOERS. Museum of Cycle Racing)

Boonen won the first edition of the two-day stage race World Ports Classic, winning the first stage in a sprint. He won the points classification and the overall lead after coming third on the second stage. One week later Boonen won Paris–Brussels.

=== 2013 ===
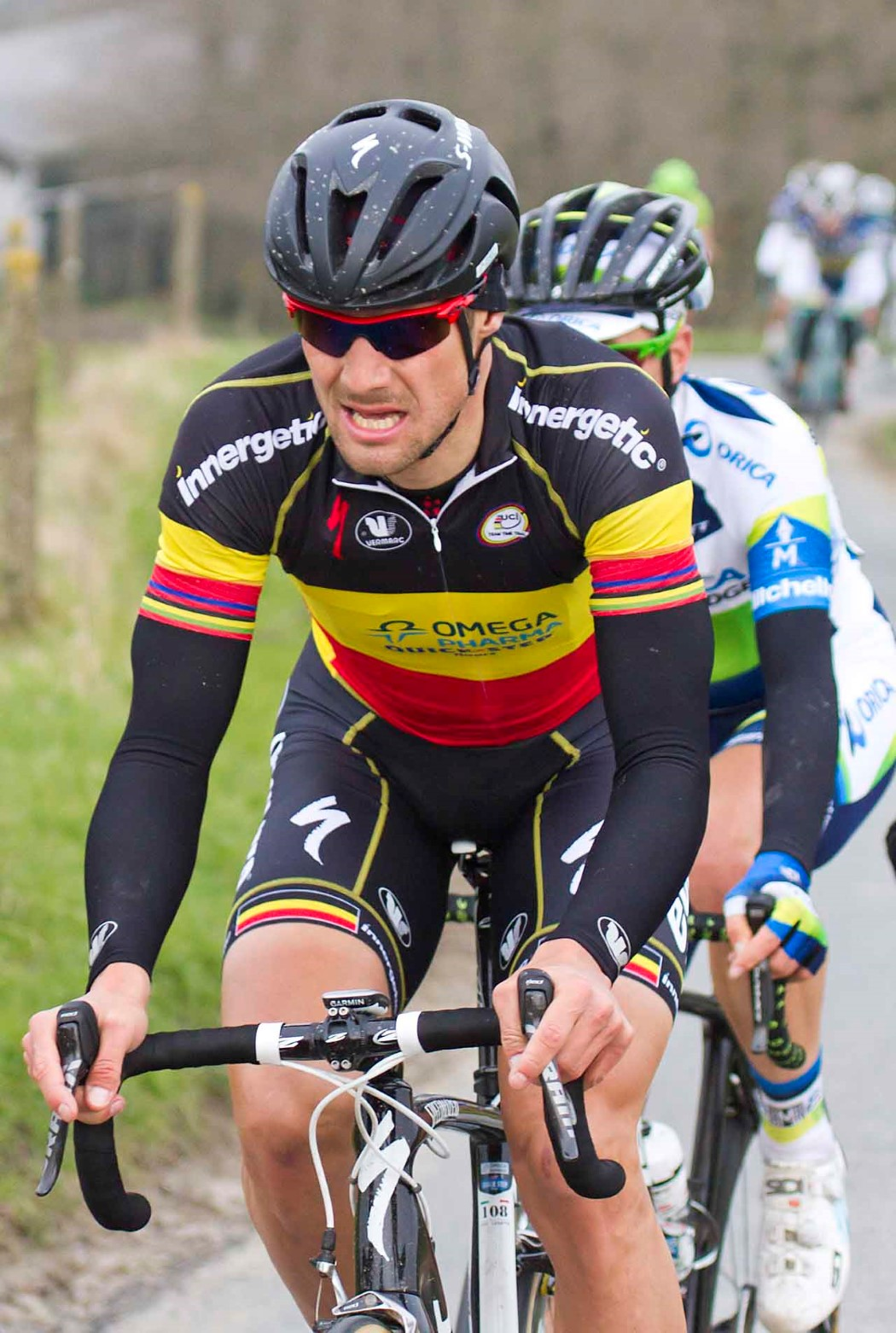
Boonen wearing the National Champion's jersey at the 2013 E3 Harelbeke

In January, Boonen spent a week in hospital with a serious infection after suffering a wound on his elbow. He returned to action in February in the Tour of Oman but could finish only 83rd in the General Classification. In March, he retired from both Gent–Wevelgem and the Tour of Flanders following crashes. His injuries from the Tour of Flanders crash prevented him from riding Paris–Roubaix. Boonen won his first race of the year at the Heiste Pijl, an event not classified by the UCI, then was the victor of the second stage of the Tour de Wallonie in July.

=== 2014 ===
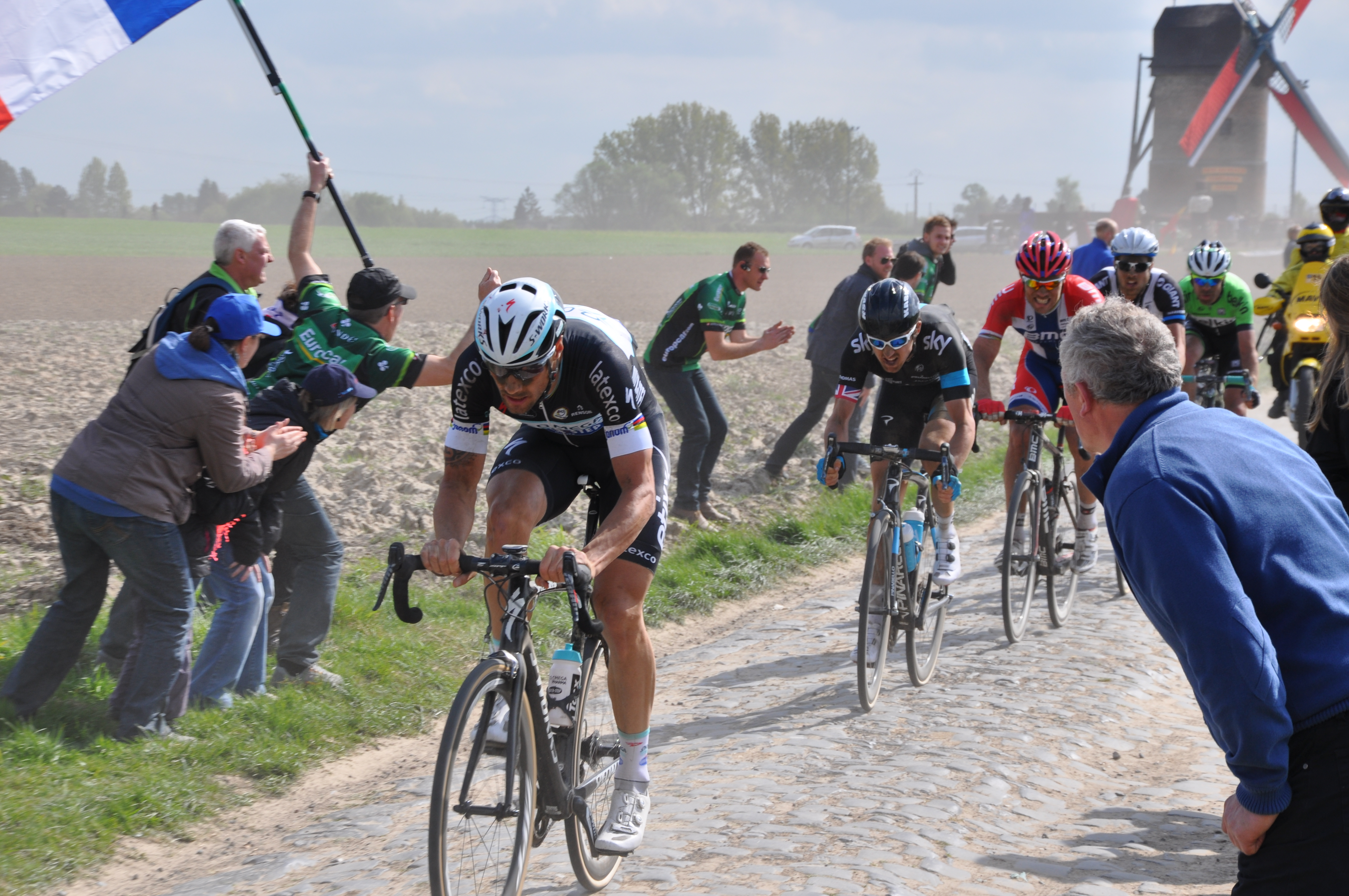
Boonen at the 2014 Paris–Roubaix

The season started well for Boonen as he took the second place overall behind his teammate Niki Terpstra and the points classification jersey in the mostly flat Tour of Qatar. His next feat came at Kuurne–Brussels–Kuurne, where he was part of a breakaway of 10 containing four of his teammates and three Belkin Pro Cycling riders. The breakaway made it home and Boonen had the better of Moreno Hofland in the sprint by a slim margin. He placed well in Paris–Roubaix and the Tour of Flanders, coming in tenth and seventh position, respectively.

=== 2015 ===
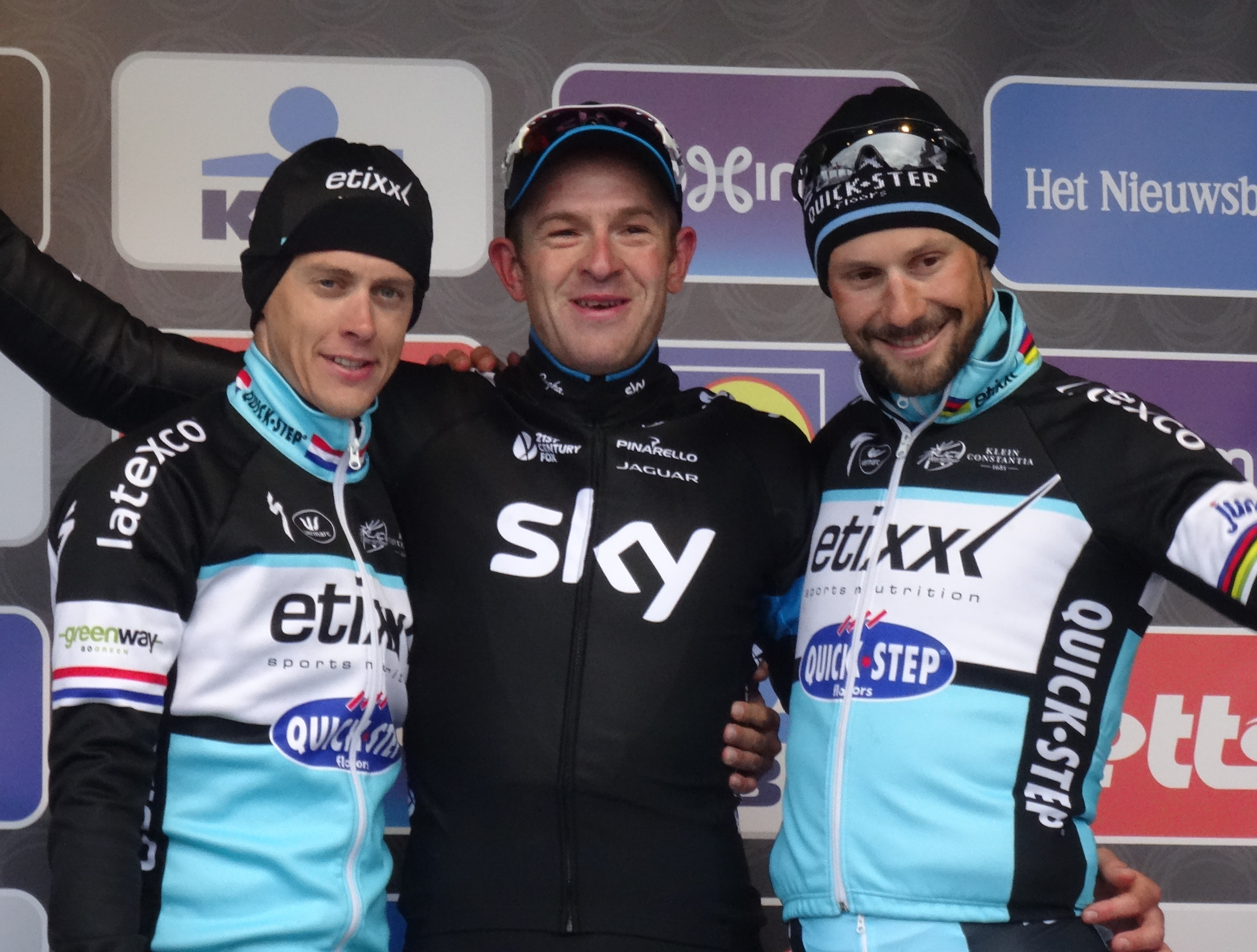
Omloop Het Nieuwsblad 2015 : Niki Terpstra (2), Ian Stannard (1) & Tom Boonen (3).

At the 2015 Omloop Het Nieuwsblad, Boonen made the decisive break with teammates Niki Terpstra and Stijn Vandenbergh, along with Ian Stannard (Team Sky). With 4.5 km remaining Boonen attacked but was gradually brought back by Stannard. After Terpstra's immediate counter-attack failed, Boonen was unable to follow Stannard's own attack, and finished third as Stannard outsprinted Terpstra for victory. On 9 March Boonen crashed out of Paris–Nice, suffering a dislocated shoulder which ruled him out of the rest of the classics season. Boonen returned to racing in late April, at the Tour of Turkey, where his role was to lead-out his teammate Mark Cavendish. He was preparing in Turkey for his first appearance in the Giro d'Italia. He abandoned the Giro after Stage 13 to participate to the Tour of Belgium, where he won the opening stage by outsprinting Arnaud Démare.

Boonen's season was brought to an end by a crash on the second stage of the Abu Dhabi Tour in October, which left him unconscious. He sustained a temporal fracture from the accident. After initially being told by doctors that it would take six months to recover, in a newspaper interview in December Boonen stated that he was training well two months after the crash without any trouble. However, the accident had left him with permanent damage to his hearing. He also said that he was "100 per cent certain" that he would compete in motor racing after retiring from competitive cycling, with the aim of competing in the 24 Hours of Zolder.

=== 2016 ===
After enduring a relatively quiet series of performances through most of the cobbled classics, Boonen finished second at Paris–Roubaix, being pipped on the line by Mat Hayman. Despite not clinching the win, Boonen's aggressive performance in the race was acclaimed by former Paris–Roubaix champions Bernard Hinault and Gilbert Duclos-Lassalle, who described him as "a warrior" and "magnificent" respectively. In July he announced that he had signed a short-term contract with Etixx-Quick Step and would retire immediately after the 2017 Paris–Roubaix. Later that month, he won the London-Surrey Classic in a sprint finish, as well as the Brussels Cycling Classic. He ended the season with third place in the World Championship road race in Qatar, where he was beaten by reigning world champion Peter Sagan and Mark Cavendish.

=== 2017 ===
At the very beginning of the season, Boonen won stage 2 of the Vuelta a San Juan. This was the first professional victory for a cyclist using disc brakes. However, he subsequently suffered a series of crashes at the Tour of Oman, Omloop Het Nieuwsblad and Tirreno–Adriatico. At Milan–San Remo, Boonen worked as a domestique for his teammates, helping Julian Alaphilippe to third place. He resumed his cobbled classics campaign at E3 Harelbeke, where he animated the race with an attack on the Taaienberg on his way to an eighth-place finish. He followed this up with a sixth place at Gent–Wevelgem, which he described as a satisfactory result, and a good indicator of form going into the cobbled Monuments.

At the Tour of Flanders, Boonen had an eventful race: he led the Quick-Step squad into the foot of the Muur van Geraardsbergen, where he helped to force a breakaway group alongside team leader and eventual race winner Philippe Gilbert, and played a key part in enabling the group to distance the bunch. However his own hopes of scoring a podium finish were scuppered by a mechanical problem on the Taaienberg, and he finished the race in 37th place. He next raced at the Scheldeprijs, his last race in Belgium, which paid tribute to Boonen by starting in his hometown of Mol. He was part of the lead-out train which helped teammate Marcel Kittel take the win. At his final race, Paris–Roubaix, Boonen finished 13th: after being part of the lead group with 35 km to go, he encouraged teammate Zdeněk Štybar to follow an attack by Daniel Oss, eventually enabling the Czech rider to finish the race as runner-up to Greg Van Avermaet.

=== After racing ===
In February 2018, it was announced that Boonen had joined forces with Quick Step's long-time Belgian rivals, Lotto–Soudal, becoming a shareholder in the team and taking up the roles of technological adviser and ambassador for the team's Captains of Cycling supporters' programme, and linking up with his former agent Paul De Geyter, who had joined the squad as general manager in September 2017.

== Motorsport career ==
In June 2017, Boonen was awarded his motor racing licence after passing the required tests. The following month, he made his car racing debut in the Volkswagen Beetle-based Fun Cup, competing in the 25 Hours of the VW Fun Cup at the Circuit de Spa-Francorchamps: he and team-mates Anthony Kumpen, Bert Longin and Ruben Van Gucht finished in 29th place out of 118 starters, 15 laps down on the winning team of Cédric Bollen, Fred Caprasse, Guillaume Mondron and Fred Bouvy.

Boonen made his full season racing debut in 2018, competing in the NASCAR Whelen Euro Series for Braxx Racing in the Elite 2 class. Boonen scored a Top-10 finish in the second race of the season at Valencia. He scored another Top-10 finish in the final race of the season at Zolder and finished 13th in the standings with two Top-10 finishes throughout the year.

For the 2019 season, Boonen drove for Deldiche Racing in the Belcar championship. He escaped major injuries during a crash at Assen that year after he collided with Kenneth Heyer at high speed. Heyer's car was launched into the air and landed on top of Boonen's Norma M20-FC, narrowly missing Boonen's head by centimeters. In addition to his Belcar campaign, he also initially signed a deal to compete part-time in the NASCAR Whelen Euro Series with PK Carsport but the deal never materialized.

Boonen won the Group CN division of the 2019 GT & Prototype Challenge in a Norma M20 FC and again in 2021.

== Personal life ==
Boonen used to live in Balen, in the Flemish Region of Belgium until moving to Monaco in late 2005. He stayed there a few years until deciding to move back to Belgium in early 2012. In 2015, his longtime girlfriend Lore gave birth to twin girls. He tweeted the news saying: "Our family has been extended with two little princesses. Valentine and Jacqueline both weigh 2.4 kg. The babies and mom are doing fine".

In 2016, Boonen paid back several million euros to the Belgian tax authorities for failing to declare his income while being a legal resident of Monaco. The investigators argued that Boonen spent most of his time in Belgium and was therefore required to pay taxes in accordance with Belgian tax law.

Prior to his relationship with Lore, Boonen was in a relationship with Sophie van Vliet, daughter of the Amstel Gold Race Director Leo van Vliet. The relationship was notable owing to the fact Boonen was 27 years of age and Sophie was 16 at the time.

== Career achievements ==
=== Major results ===
1998
3rd Time trial, National Junior Road Championships
1999
6th Paris–Roubaix Espoirs
10th Ronde van Vlaanderen U23
2000
1st Paris–Tours Espoirs
1st Grote Prijs Stad Geel
2nd Road race, National Under-23 Road Championships
3rd Paris–Roubaix Espoirs
6th Overall Le Triptyque des Monts et Châteaux

1st Stage 1

7th Nationale Sluitingsprijs
2001
1st Road race, National Under-23 Road Championships
1st Zellik–Galmaarden
1st Internationale Wielertrofee Jong Maar Moedig
1st Stage 4a Grand Prix Guillaume Tell
2nd Liège–Bastogne–Liège U23
2nd Circuit de Wallonie
3rd Grand Prix de Waregem
4th Paris–Roubaix Espoirs
6th Flèche Ardennaise
7th De Vlaamse Pijl
8th Ronde van Vlaanderen U23
9th Road race, UEC European Under-23 Road Championships
2002 (1 pro win)
1st Stage 1 (TTT) Volta a Catalunya
1st Stage 2 Uniqa Classic
2nd Overall Circuit Franco-Belge

1st Young rider classification

3rd Paris–Roubaix
6th Classic Haribo
6th Kampioenschap van Vlaanderen
6th Nationale Sluitingsprijs
7th Overall Three Days of De Panne
7th Kuurne–Brussels–Kuurne
7th Gent–Wevelgem
7th Schaal Sels
2003 (1)
Tour of Belgium

1st Mountains classification
1st Stage 3

3rd Gent–Wevelgem
5th Omloop Het Volk
8th Overall Tour de Wallonie
2004 (19)
1st Overall Tour de Picardie

1st Points classification
1st Stages 1 & 2

1st Gent–Wevelgem
1st E3 Prijs Vlaanderen
1st Scheldeprijs
1st GP Rik Van Steenbergen
Tour de France

1st Stages 6 & 20

Deutschland Tour

1st Stages 2 & 7

1st Stage 1 Vuelta a Andalucía
1st Stage 2 Tour of Belgium
1st Stage 3 Tour of Britain
2nd International Grand Prix Doha
3rd Overall Tour of Qatar

1st Points classification
1st Young rider classification
1st Stage 2

6th Overall Ster Elektrotoer

1st Points classification
1st Prologue & Stage 1

6th Overall Circuit Franco-Belge

1st Stages 3 & 4

6th Tour de Rijke
7th Grand Prix Eddy Merckx (with Servais Knaven)
9th Kuurne–Brussels–Kuurne
9th Paris–Roubaix
2005 (14)
1st Road race, UCI Road World Championships
1st Overall Tour of Belgium

1st Points classification
1st Stages 1 & 2

1st Paris–Roubaix
1st Tour of Flanders
1st E3 Prijs Vlaanderen
Tour de France

1st Stages 2 & 3

Paris–Nice

1st Stages 1 & 2

2nd International Grand Prix Doha
2nd Omloop Het Volk
4th Overall Tour of Qatar

1st Points classification
1st Stages 1 & 2

4th Scheldeprijs
8th Milan–San Remo
10th Overall Tour de Picardie

1st Stage 2

10th Grand Prix de Wallonie
2006 (21)
1st Overall Tour of Qatar

1st Points classification
1st Stages 1, 2, 3 & 5

1st Tour of Flanders
1st E3 Prijs Vlaanderen
1st Scheldeprijs
1st Veenendaal–Veenendaal
1st International Grand Prix Doha
Paris–Nice

1st Stages 1, 2 & 4

Eneco Tour

1st Stages 1, 3 & 5

1st Stage 5 Vuelta a Andalucía
1st Stage 1 Tour de Suisse
1st Stage 6 Tour of Britain
2nd Paris–Roubaix
2nd Paris–Brussels
3rd Road race, National Road Championships
3rd Kuurne–Brussels–Kuurne
4th Overall Tour of Belgium

1st Points classification
1st Stages 2 & 3b

4th Milan–San Remo
5th Dwars door Vlaanderen
9th Road race, UCI Road World Championships
10th Grand Prix de Wallonie
10th LuK Challenge Chrono (with Sébastien Rosseler)
Tour de France

Held after Stages 3–6

2007 (11)
1st E3 Prijs Vlaanderen
1st Kuurne–Brussels–Kuurne
1st Dwars door Vlaanderen
Tour de France

1st Points classification
1st Stages 6 & 12

1st Stage 4 Vuelta a Andalucía
1st Stage 5 Tour of Belgium
2nd Road race, National Road Championships
2nd Overall Tour of Qatar

1st Points classification
1st Stages 1 (TTT), 2, 3, 4 & 6

3rd Omloop Het Volk
3rd Milan–San Remo
6th Paris–Roubaix
2008 (15)
1st Overall Tour of Qatar

1st Points classification
1st Stages 1 (TTT), 2, 3 & 6

1st Paris–Roubaix
Vuelta a España

1st Stages 3 & 16

Eneco Tour

1st Stages 1 & 4

1st Stage 2 Tour of California
1st Stage 5 Tour of Belgium
1st Stage 4 Ster Elektrotoer
1st Stage 7 Tour of Austria
1st Stage 1 Tour de Wallonie
1st Stage 1 Circuit Franco-Belge
2nd Scheldeprijs
2nd Nationale Sluitingsprijs
4th Kuurne–Brussels–Kuurne
8th E3 Prijs Vlaanderen
10th Paris–Tours
2009 (7)
1st Road race, National Road Championships
1st Overall Tour of Qatar

1st Stage 3

1st Paris–Roubaix
1st Kuurne–Brussels–Kuurne
1st Stage 3 Eneco Tour
2nd Overall Circuit Franco-Belge

1st Stage 3

2nd E3 Prijs Vlaanderen
2nd Paris–Tours
3rd Dwars door Vlaanderen
4th Overall Ster Elektrotoer
10th Omloop Het Nieuwsblad
2010 (4)
1st Stage 2 Tirreno–Adriatico
1st Stage 5 Tour of Oman
2nd Milan–San Remo
2nd Tour of Flanders
2nd E3 Prijs Vlaanderen
3rd Overall Tour of Qatar

1st Stages 3 & 5

5th Paris–Roubaix
2011 (2)
1st Gent–Wevelgem
1st Stage 1 Tour of Qatar
4th Tour of Flanders
9th Dwars door Vlaanderen
2012 (13)
1st Team time trial, UCI Road World Championships
1st Road race, National Road Championships
1st Overall Tour of Qatar

1st Points classification
1st Stages 1 & 4

1st Overall World Ports Classic

1st Points classification
1st Stage 1

1st Paris–Roubaix
1st Tour of Flanders
1st Gent–Wevelgem
1st E3 Harelbeke
1st Paris–Brussels
1st Stage 2 Paris–Nice
1st Stage 7 Tour de San Luis
2nd Omloop Het Nieuwsblad
3rd UCI World Tour
4th Vattenfall Cyclassics
2013 (1)
1st Heistse Pijl
1st Stage 2 Tour de Wallonie
7th E3 Harelbeke
2014 (5)
1st Kuurne–Brussels–Kuurne
1st Heistse Pijl
Tour of Belgium

1st Stages 1 & 2

2nd Overall Tour of Qatar

1st Points classification
1st Stages 2 & 4

3rd Team time trial, UCI Road World Championships
3rd Road race, National Road Championships
5th Gent–Wevelgem
7th Tour of Flanders
10th Paris–Roubaix
2015 (4)
1st Rund um Köln
1st Münsterland Giro
Tour of Belgium

1st Points classification
1st Stage 1

1st Stage 3 Eneco Tour
2nd Team time trial, UCI Road World Championships
2nd Grand Prix de Fourmies
3rd Omloop Het Nieuwsblad
3rd Brussels Cycling Classic
4th Vattenfall Cyclassics
4th Grand Prix Pino Cerami
6th Road race, European Games
9th Overall Tour of Qatar
2016 (3)
1st London–Surrey Classic
1st Brussels Cycling Classic
1st Stage 1 Tour de Wallonie
2nd Paris–Roubaix
2nd Ronde van Limburg
3rd Road race, UCI Road World Championships
3rd Tour de l'Eurométropole
2017 (1)
1st Stage 2 Vuelta a San Juan
6th Gent–Wevelgem
8th E3 Harelbeke

==== Classics results timeline ====
Monument	2002	2003	2004	2005	2006	2007	2008	2009	2010	2011	2012	2013	2014	2015	2016	2017
Milan–San Remo	—	78	75	8	4	3	29	15	2	28	22	DNF	—	—	55	65
Tour of Flanders	24	25	25	1	1	12	17	20	2	4	1	DNF	7	—	15	37
Paris–Roubaix	3	24	9	1	2	6	1	1	5	DNF	1	—	10	—	2	13
Liège–Bastogne–Liège	Did not contest during career															
Giro di Lombardia	Did not contest during career															
Classic	2002	2003	2004	2005	2006	2007	2008	2009	2010	2011	2012	2013	2014	2015	2016	2017
Omloop Het Nieuwsblad	63	5	—	2	13	3	85	10	59	35	2	84	33	3	11	DNF
Kuurne–Brussels–Kuurne	7	—	9	22	3	1	4	1	DNF	101	42	NH	1	29	69	DNS
Dwars door Vlaanderen	—	34	28	80	5	1	37	3	20	9	—	—	14	—	—	—
E3 Harelbeke	—	12	1	1	1	1	8	2	2	—	1	7	11	—	14	8
Gent–Wevelgem	7	3	1	26	117	27	150	71	DNF	1	1	DNF	5	—	20	6
Scheldeprijs	—	103	1	4	1	—	2	56	18	116	130	—	84	—	103	43
London–Surrey Classic	Race did not exist									73	—	—	—	—	1	—
Brussels Cycling Classic	—	—	41	—	2	—	—	—	—	—	1	—	—	3	1	—
Paris–Tours	22	102	—	—	DNF	—	10	2	136	—	—	—	—	—	21	—

==== Major championship results timeline ====
	2002	2003	2004	2005	2006	2007	2008	2009	2010	2011	2012	2013	2014	2015	2016	2017
Olympic Games	Not held		—	Not held			—	Not held			28	Not held			—	NH
World Championships	38	17	DNF	1	9	—	38	38	—	—	12	—	49	35	3	—
National Championships	—	—	—	—	3	2	5	1	—	7	1	DNF	3	8	DNF	—

Legend
—	Did not compete
DNF	Did not finish
NH	Not held
DNS	Did not start

==== Records ====
- Most cobbled classics wins: 15 in 2005->2010, 2011 & 2012
- The only rider to win all 4 cobbled classics in one season: 2012
- Most Paris–Roubaix wins: 4 in 2005, 2008, 2009 & 2012 (record shared with Roger De Vlaeminck)
- Most Tour of Flanders wins: 3 in 2005, 2006, 2012 (shared record)
- Most Gent–Wevelgem wins: 3 in 2004, 2011 & 2012 (shared record)
- Most E3 Harelbeke wins: 5 in 2004, 2005, 2006, 2007 & 2012
- Most Tour of Qatar wins: 4 in 2006, 2008, 2009 & 2012
- Most Kuurne-Brussels-Kuurne wins: 3 in 2007, 2009 & 2014

=== Awards and honours ===
- Crystal Bicycle – Best Young Rider: 2001
- Crystal Bicycle – Best Professional Cyclist: 2004, 2005, 2006, 2012
- RTBF Sprint d'Or: 2004, 2005, 2006
- Belgian National Sports Merit Award: 2005
- Belgian Sportsman of the year: 2005, 2007, 2012
- Belgian Sports Personality of the Year: 2005
- Flandrien of the Year: 2004, 2005, 2012
- Vlaamse Reus: 2005
- Vélo d'Or Mondial: 2005, Runner-up: 2012
- Cyclingnews.com Best Cyclist of the Year: 2005
- Swiss Mendrisio d'Or: 2005
- La Gazzetta dello Sport Cycling Oscar: 2005
- International Herald Tribune Cyclist of the Year: 2005
- Honorary Citizen of Balen: 2006
- VeloNews Classics Rider of the Year: 2012
- Sculpture on Taaienberg, Maarkedal: 2023
- UCI Top 100 of All Time: 5,130 points

== Racing record ==
=== Complete 24 Hours of Zolder results ===
Year	Team	Co-Drivers	Car	Class	Laps	Pos.	Class Pos.
2017	(Belgium) Yokohama Power Racing	(Belgium) Olivier Hermans (Belgium) Mike Janssen (Belgium) Chris Van Woensel	Ford Mustang	Belcar 1	64	DNF	DNF
2018	(Belgium) Heinz POWERKIT.shop by Wolf Racing	(Italy) Ivan Bellarosa (Italy) Guglielmo Belotti (Belgium) Anthony Kumpen (Belgium) Bert Longin	Wolf GB08 Tornado	Belcar 2	780	4th	2nd
2018	(Belgium) PK Carsport	(Belgium) Christophe Beliën (Belgium) Frank Beliën (Belgium) Pedro Bonnet (Belgium) Anthony Kumpen (Belgium) Bert Longin	Porsche 991 GT3 Cup	Belcar 1	676	20th	6th
2019	(Belgium) Deldice Racing by JTB	(Belgium) Sam Dejonghe (Belgium) Thomas Piessens	Norma M20-FC	Belcar 1	586	29th	5th
2022	(Belgium) RedAnt Racing	(Netherlands) Kevin Abbring (Belgium) Jimmy de Breucker (Belgium) Kobe de Breucker (Belgium) Luc Vanderfeesten	Porsche 992 GT3 Cup	GTA	621	19th	9th
2023	(Belgium) PK Carsport	(Israel) Alon Day (Belgium) Koen De Wit (Belgium) Matisse Lismont	BMW M2 CS	TA	732	8th	1st
2024	(Belgium) Rush Drivers Collective by NGT	(Belgium) Fréderic Bouvy (Belgium) Toon Hungenaert (Belgium) Simon Tourneurt (Belgium) Gilles Verleyen	Porsche 992 GT3 Cup	GTA	763	7th	7th

=== NASCAR ===
==== Whelen Euro Series – Elite 2 ====
(key) Bold - Pole position awarded by fastest qualifying time (in Race 1) or by previous race's fastest lap (in Race 2). Italics - Fastest lap. * – Most laps led. ^ – Most positions gained.

NASCAR Whelen Euro Series – Elite 2 results
Year	Team	No.	Make	1	2	3	4	5	6	7	8	9	10	11	12	NWES	Pts
2018	Braxx Racing	91	Chevy	VAL; 12	VAL; 10	FRA; 21	FRA; 11	BRH; 13	BRH; 14	TOU; 17	TOU; 12	HOC; 14	HOC; 26	ZOL; 12	ZOL; 10	13th	339
