= 2005 UCI Road World Championships – Men's road race =

Men's Individual Road Race
2005 UCI Road World Championships
- Rainbow jersey

Race details
- Dates: September 25, 2005
- Stages: 1
- Distance: 273 km (169.6 mi)
- Winning time: 06h 26' 10"

Medalists
| | Gold | Tom Boonen (Belgium) |
| | Silver | Alejandro Valverde (Spain) |
| | Bronze | Anthony Geslin (France) |

These are the results for the 2005 UCI Road World Championships bicycle race road race. The men's elite race was held on Sunday September 25, 2005 in Madrid, Spain, over a total distance of 273 kilometres. Despite several rumours before the race that some Belgian cyclists would ride for Davitamon–Lotto teammate Robbie McEwen, the Belgian squad did work together and their leader Tom Boonen (of the opposing Quick-Step–Innergetic team) won the race.

== Final classification ==
| Rank | Rider | Time |
|---|---|---|
| 1st place, gold medalist(s) | Tom Boonen (BEL) | 06:26:10 |
| 2nd place, silver medalist(s) | Alejandro Valverde (ESP) | s.t. |
| 3rd place, bronze medalist(s) | Anthony Geslin (FRA) | s.t. |
| 4 | Marcus Ljungqvist (SWE) | s.t. |
| 5 | Murilo Fischer (BRA) | s.t. |
| 6 | Jakob Piil (DEN) | s.t. |
| 7 | Alexandre Kolobnev (RUS) | s.t. |
| 8 | Andreas Klier (GER) | s.t. |
| 9 | Julian Dean (NZL) | s.t. |
| 10 | Martin Elmiger (SUI) | s.t. |
| 11 | Janez Brajkovič (SLO) | s.t. |
| 12 | Steffen Wesemann (SUI) | s.t. |
| 13 | Paolo Bettini (ITA) | s.t. |
| 14 | Grégory Rast (SUI) | s.t. |
| 15 | Thomas Dekker (NED) | s.t. |
| 16 | Constantino Zaballa (ESP) | s.t. |
| 17 | Koos Moerenhout (NED) | s.t. |
| 18 | Michael Boogerd (NED) | s.t. |
| 19 | Laurent Brochard (FRA) | s.t. |
| 20 | Gorazd Štangelj (SLO) | s.t. |
| 21 | Alexandr Vinokourov (KAZ) | s.t. |
| 22 | Marcos Antonio Serrano (ESP) | s.t. |
| 23 | Guido Trenti (USA) | s.t. |
| 24 | Denis Menchov (RUS) | + 0.10 |
| 25 | Mario Aerts (BEL) | + 0.11 |
| 26 | Nick Nuyens (BEL) | + 0.21 |
| 27 | Björn Leukemans (BEL) | + 0.23 |
| 28 | Alexandre Usov (BLR) | + 0.25 |
| 29 | Erik Zabel (GER) | s.t. |
| 30 | Robbie McEwen (AUS) | s.t. |
| 31 | Uroš Murn (SLO) | s.t. |
| 32 | René Haselbacher (AUT) | s.t. |
| 33 | Aurélien Clerc (SUI) | s.t. |
| 34 | Peter Van Petegem (BEL) | s.t. |
| 35 | Alessandro Petacchi (ITA) | s.t. |
| 36 | Alejandro Borrajo (ARG) | s.t. |
| 37 | Matija Kvasina (CRO) | s.t. |
| 38 | Sergey Lagutin (UZB) | s.t. |
| 39 | Lars Bak (DEN) | s.t. |
| 40 | Jan Hruška (CZE) | s.t. |
| 41 | Roger Hammond (GBR) | s.t. |
| 42 | Mikhaylo Khalilov (UKR) | s.t. |
| 43 | Ján Valach (SVK) | s.t. |
| 44 | Piotr Wadecki (POL) | s.t. |
| 45 | Marek Rutkiewicz (POL) | s.t. |
| 46 | Vladimir Gusev (RUS) | s.t. |
| 47 | Christophe Le Mével (FRA) | s.t. |
| 48 | Miguel Ángel Martín Perdiguero (ESP) | s.t. |
| 49 | Bram Tankink (NED) | s.t. |
| 50 | Óscar Pereiro (ESP) | s.t. |
| 51 | Jean-Patrick Nazon (FRA) | s.t. |
| 52 | Karsten Kroon (NED) | s.t. |
| 53 | Denys Kostyuk (UKR) | s.t. |
| 54 | Filippo Pozzato (ITA) | s.t. |
| 55 | David George (RSA) | s.t. |
| 56 | Juan Antonio Flecha Giannoni (ESP) | s.t. |
| 57 | Stijn Devolder (BEL) | s.t. |
| 58 | Andrey Kashechkin (KAZ) | s.t. |
| 59 | Fred Rodriguez (USA) | s.t. |
| 60 | Joost Posthuma (NED) | s.t. |
| 61 | Sergei Ivanov (RUS) | s.t. |
| 62 | Igor Astarloa (ESP) | s.t. |
| 63 | Marco Velo (ITA) | s.t. |
| 64 | Rolf Aldag (GER) | s.t. |
| 65 | Pieter Weening (NED) | s.t. |
| 66 | Matteo Tosatto (ITA) | s.t. |
| 67 | Sylvain Chavanel (FRA) | s.t. |
| 68 | Francisco Mancebo (ESP) | + 0.36 |
| 69 | David Blanco (ESP) | s.t. |
| 70 | Peter Wrolich (AUT) | + 0.43 |
| 71 | Léon van Bon (NED) | + 0.47 |
| 72 | Allan Davis (AUS) | + 1.12 |
| 73 | Luca Paolini (ITA) | + 1.16 |
| 74 | Vladimir Efimkin (RUS) | + 1.46 |
| 75 | Mark Scanlon (IRL) | + 2.37 |
| 76 | Thomas Löfkvist (SWE) | + 2.45 |
| 77 | Philippe Gilbert (BEL) | s.t. |
| 78 | Ryder Hesjedal (CAN) | + 4.18 |
| 79 | Pedro Soeiro (POR) | + 4.50 |
| 80 | James Lewis Perry (RSA) | + 4.57 |
| 81 | Marc Wauters (BEL) | s.t. |
| 82 | Patrick Calcagni (SUI) | + 5.04 |
| 83 | Michael Rogers (AUS) | + 5.06 |
| 84 | Giovanni Lombardi (ITA) | s.t. |
| 85 | Martin Prázdnovský (SVK) | + 5.19 |
| 86 | John Lieswyn (USA) | s.t. |
| 87 | Simon Gerrans (AUS) | + 5.25 |
| 88 | Baden Cooke (AUS) | s.t. |
| 89 | Maxim Gourov (KAZ) | s.t. |
| 90 | Rafael Nuritdinov (UZB) | s.t. |
| 91 | Jörg Jaksche (GER) | s.t. |
| 92 | Cédric Vasseur (FRA) | s.t. |
| 93 | Leonardo Duque (COL) | + 6.01 |
| 94 | Henk Vogels (AUS) | s.t. |
| 95 | Jarosław Zarębski (POL) | s.t. |
| 96 | Bartosz Huzarski (POL) | s.t. |
| 97 | Fabian Wegmann (GER) | s.t. |
| 98 | Markus Zberg (SUI) | s.t. |
| 99 | Ján Svorada (CZE) | s.t. |
| 100 | Petr Benčik (CZE) | s.t. |
| 101 | Mathew Hayman (AUS) | s.t. |
| 102 | Andrey Mizurov (KAZ) | s.t. |
| 103 | Ryan Cox (RSA) | s.t. |
| 104 | Ian McLeod (RSA) | s.t. |
| 105 | Daniele Bennati (ITA) | s.t. |
| 106 | Roger Beuchat (SUI) | s.t. |
| 107 | Matej Mugerli (SLO) | s.t. |
| 108 | Guillermo Bongiorno (ARG) | s.t. |
| 109 | Lorenzo Bernucci (ITA) | s.t. |
| 110 | Bernhard Eisel (AUT) | s.t. |
| 111 | Magnus Bäckstedt (SWE) | s.t. |
| 112 | Bradley Wiggins (GBR) | s.t. |
| 113 | Carlos Da Cruz (FRA) | s.t. |
| 114 | Jimmy Casper (FRA) | s.t. |
| 115 | Thor Hushovd (NOR) | s.t. |
| 116 | Markus Fothen (GER) | + 7.03 |
| 117 | Matthias Kessler (GER) | s.t. |
| 118 | Serguei Yakovlev (KAZ) | s.t. |
| 119 | Christophe Kern (FRA) | + 7.05 |
| 120 | Raivis Belohvoščiks (LAT) | + 9.50 |
| 121 | Luis Felipe Laverde (COL) | + 9.51 |
| 122 | Kim Kirchen (LUX) | + 10.43 |
| 123 | Fabian Cancellara (SUI) | + 10.45 |
| 124 | Robert Radosz (POL) | + 12.51 |
| 125 | Shinichi Fukushima (JPN) | + 12.56 |
| 126 | Martin Riška (SVK) | + 14.45 |
| 127 | Hugo Sabido (POR) | + 14.47 |
| 128 | Bruno Neves (POR) | s.t. |
| 129 | Martín Garrido (ARG) | + 14.51 |
| 130 | Piotr Mazur (POL) | + 14.55 |
| 131 | Mitja Mahorič (SLO) | + 17.27 |
| 132 | Márcio May (BRA) | + 19.19 |
| 133 | Aleksejs Saramotins (LAT) | + 25.40 |
| 134 | Rodney Green (RSA) | + 27.10 |
| 135 | Makoto Iijima (JPN) | + 27.12 |
| 136 | Mehdi Sohrabi (IRN) | + 27.13 |

5 riders did not start the race although on the official list of participants, while 52 riders started but did not finish the race.
