= Marcus Burghardt =

Road bicycle racer

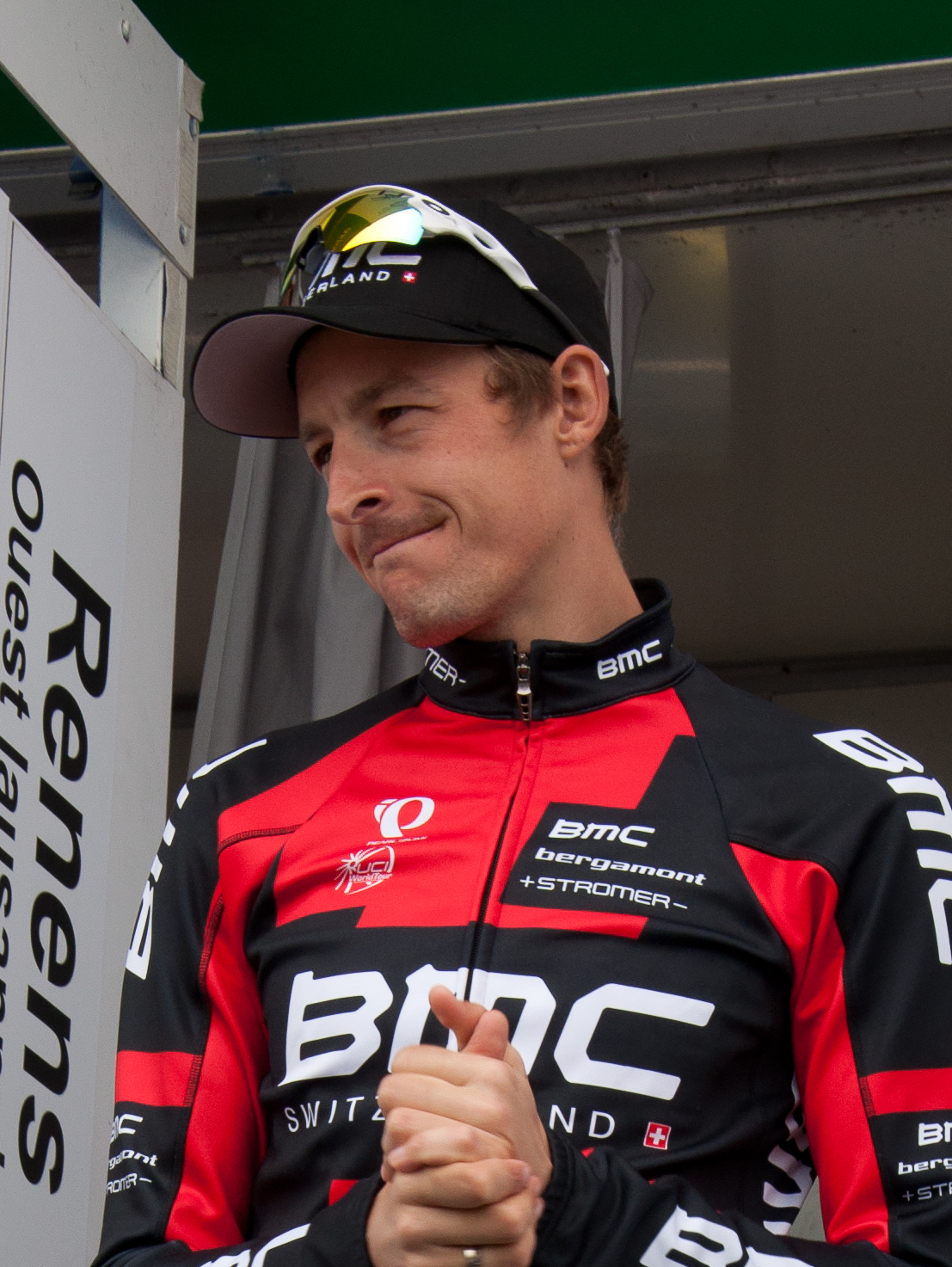
- Burghardt at the 2013 Tour de Romandie

Personal information
- Full name: Marcus Burghardt
- Born: 30 June 1983 (age 43) Zschopau, Saxony, East Germany
- Height: 1.89 m (6 ft 2 1/2 in)
- Weight: 75 kg (165 lb; 11 st 11 lb)

Cycling career
- Sport: Cycling
- Current team: Retired
- Discipline: Road
- Role: Rider
- Rider type: Classics specialist

Professional teams
- 2005–2009: T-Mobile Team
- 2010–2016: BMC Racing Team
- 2017–2021: Bora–Hansgrohe

Major wins
- Grand Tours Tour de France 1 individual stage (2008) One-day races and Classics National Road Race Championships (2017) Gent–Wevelgem (2007)

Marcus Burghardt (born 30 June 1983) is a German former professional road bicycle racer, who rode professionally between 2005 and 2021 for the Team Columbia–HTC, BMC Racing Team and Bora–Hansgrohe teams. During his career, Burghardt took seven professional victories, including the 2007 Gent–Wevelgem, the German National Road Race Championships in 2017, and a stage win at the 2008 Tour de France.

== Career ==
Burghardt was born in Zschopau, Saxony, and raced as an amateur in the U-23 Wiesenhof team, with which he tasted success in the shape of the overall win at the Bundesliga Gerlingen in 2004. Burghardt turned professional in 2005, and won the UCI ProTour race Gent–Wevelgem in 2007, ahead of teammate Roger Hammond. He has also performed well in some races such as the Dwars door Vlaanderen and some stages of the Vuelta a España.

He was successful in winning Stage 18 of the 2008 Tour de France into Saint Etienne, beating break-away compatriot Carlos Barredo.

Burghardt signed with BMC Racing Team for the 2010 season. After seven years there, in August 2016 Bora–Hansgrohe announced that he would join them for 2017. He remained with the team for five seasons, with his sole victory coming in the German National Road Race Championships in 2017.

In April 2022, he announced his retirement from professional cycling, while rehabilitating from a severe wrist injury suffered at the 2021 Tour de Pologne. In June 2022, he joined the executive committee of the German Cycling Federation.

== Major results ==
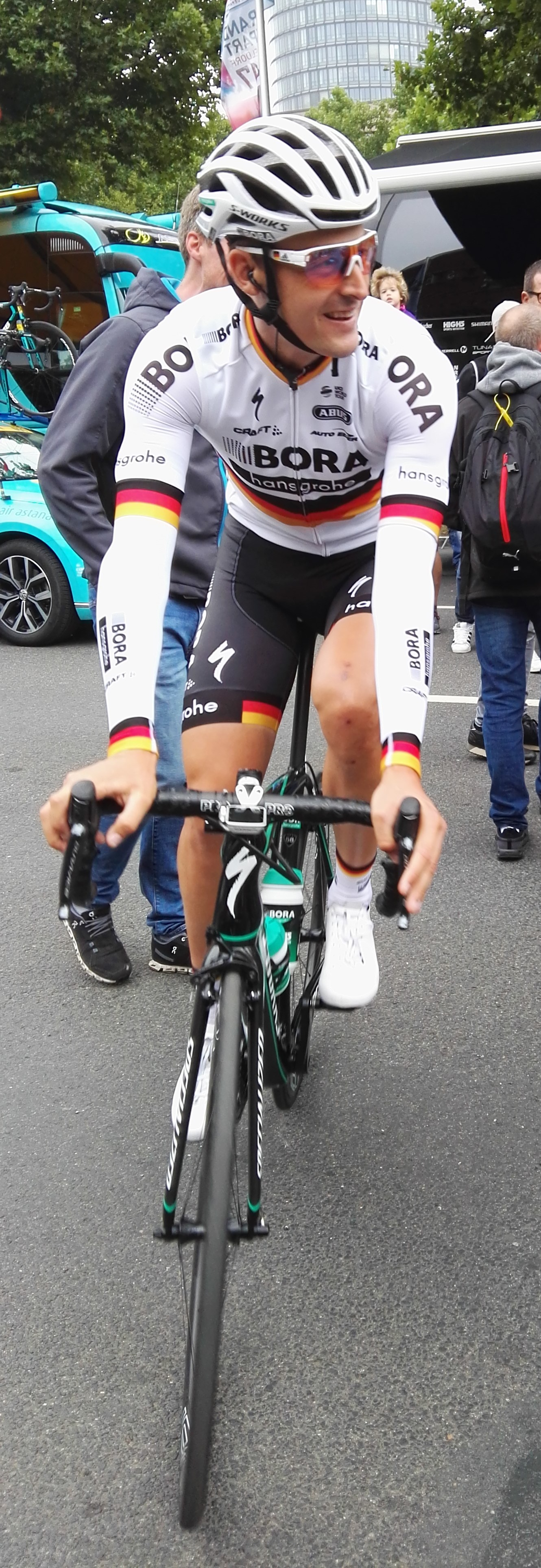
Burghardt at the 2017 Tour de France

2001
1st Overall Trofeo Karlsberg

1st Stages 1 & 5

9th Road race, UCI Junior Road World Championships
2003
10th Overall Ronde de l'Isard

1st Stage 3

2004
4th Paris–Roubaix Espoirs
8th Overall Le Triptyque des Monts et Châteaux
10th Overall Giro delle Regioni
2005
4th Dwars door Vlaanderen
2006
7th Dwars door Vlaanderen
2007
1st Gent–Wevelgem
3rd E3 Prijs Vlaanderen
6th Overall 3-Länder-Tour

1st Stages 3 & 5

6th Trofeo Cala Millor-Cala Bona
2008
Tour de France

1st Stage 18
Combativity award Stage 18

2009
4th Overall Sachsen Tour
5th Omloop Het Nieuwsblad
7th Tour of Flanders
7th Gent–Wevelgem
10th E3 Prijs Vlaanderen
2010
Tour de Suisse

1st Points classification
1st Stages 5 & 7

5th Overall Tour of Qatar
7th Overall Tour of Oman
2011
9th Overall Tour of Qatar
2013
1st Mountains classification, Tour de Romandie
2015
1st Stage 1 (TTT) Vuelta a España
3rd Road race, National Road Championships
2017
1st Road race, National Road Championships
2018
10th Omloop Het Nieuwsblad
2019
2nd Road race, National Road Championships
2021
5th Road race, National Road Championships

=== Grand Tour general classification results timeline ===
| Grand Tour | 2005 | 2006 | 2007 | 2008 | 2009 | 2010 | 2011 | 2012 | 2013 | 2014 | 2015 | 2016 | 2017 | 2018 | 2019 |
|---|---|---|---|---|---|---|---|---|---|---|---|---|---|---|---|
| Giro d'Italia | — | — | — | — | — | — | — | — | — | — | 70 | — | — | — | — |
| Tour de France | — | — | 127 | 120 | — | 161 | 164 | 58 | 98 | 154 | — | 89 | 131 | 92 | 141 |
| / Vuelta a España | 76 | — | — | — | — | — | — | — | — | — | DNF | — | — | 149 | — |

Legend
| — | Did not compete |
| DNF | Did not finish |
