= 2004 E3 Prijs Vlaanderen =

Race details
- Dates: 27 March 2004
- Stages: 1
- Distance: 195 km (121 mi)
- Winning time: 4h 31' 00"

Results
	Winner	Tom Boonen (BEL)	(Quick-Step–Davitamon)
	Second	Jaan Kirsipuu (EST)	(AG2R Prévoyance)
	Third	Andris Naudužs (LAT)	(De Nardi–Piemme Telekom)

The 2004 E3 Prijs Vlaanderen was the 47th edition of the E3 Harelbeke cycle race and was held on 27 March 2004. The race started and finished in Harelbeke. The race was won by Tom Boonen of the Quick-Step team.

== General classification ==
Final general classification

Rank	Rider	Team	Time
1	Tom Boonen (BEL)	Quick-Step–Davitamon	4h 31' 00"
2	Jaan Kirsipuu (EST)	AG2R Prévoyance	+ 0"
3	Andris Naudužs (LAT)	De Nardi–Piemme Telekom	+ 0"
4	Steven de Jongh (NED)	Rabobank	+ 0"
5	Marcus Ljungqvist (SWE)	Alessio–Bianchi	+ 0"
6	Gabriele Balducci (ITA)	Saeco	+ 0"
7	Andreas Klier (GER)	T-Mobile Team	+ 0"
8	Roger Hammond (GBR)	Mr. Bookmaker–Palmans–Collstrop	+ 0"
9	Léon van Bon (NED)	Lotto–Domo	+ 0"
10	Fabio Baldato (ITA)	Alessio–Bianchi	+ 0"
