= GP Erik Breukink =

Race details
- Date: March
- Region: North Brabant, Netherlands
- Discipline: Road
- Type: Stage race

History
- First edition: 2002
- Editions: 2
- Final edition: 2003
- First winner: Fabian Cancellara (SUI)
- Most wins: No repeat winners
- Final winner: Erik Dekker (NED)

The GP Erik Breukink was a multi-day road cycling held annually in the Netherlands in 2002 and 2003.

It is named after Erik Breukink, a former professional cyclist.

== Winners ==
Year	Winner	Second	Third
2002	(Switzerland) Fabian Cancellara	(Australia) Bradley McGee	(Belgium) Steven van Malderghem
2003	(Netherlands) Erik Dekker	(Lithuania) Tomas Vaitkus	(Austria) Bernhard Eisel
