= 2004 Scheldeprijs =

Race details
- Dates: 14 April 2004
- Stages: 1
- Distance: 200 km (124.3 mi)
- Winning time: 4h 19' 00"

Results
	Winner	Tom Boonen (BEL)	(Quick-Step–Davitamon)
	Second	Robbie McEwen (AUS)	(Lotto–Domo)
	Third	Simone Cadamuro (ITA)	(De Nardi)

The 2004 Scheldeprijs was the 91st edition of the Scheldeprijs cycle race and was held on 14 April 2004. The race was won by Tom Boonen of the Quick-Step team.

== General classification ==
Final general classification

Rank	Rider	Team	Time
1	Tom Boonen (BEL)	Quick-Step–Davitamon	4h 19' 00"
2	Robbie McEwen (AUS)	Lotto–Domo	+ 0"
3	Simone Cadamuro (ITA)	De Nardi	+ 0"
4	Enrico Poitschke (GER)	Team Wiesenhof	+ 0"
5	Bernhard Eisel (AUT)	FDJeux.com	+ 0"
6	Alexandre Usov (BLR)	Phonak	+ 0"
7	Ludovic Capelle (BEL)	Landbouwkrediet–Colnago	+ 0"
8	Enrico Degano (ITA)	Barloworld	+ 0"
9	Christoph Roodhooft (BEL)	Mr. Bookmaker–Palmans–Collstrop	+ 0"
10	Roy Sentjens (BEL)	Rabobank	+ 0"
