= 2011 Dwars door Vlaanderen =

- Event poster with previous winner Matti Breschel

Race details
- Dates: 23 March 2011
- Stages: 1
- Distance: 201 km (124.9 mi)
- Winning time: 4h 39' 55"

Results
| | Winner | Nick Nuyens (BEL) |
| | Second | Geraint Thomas (GBR) |
| | Third | Tyler Farrar (USA) |

The 2011 Dwars door Vlaanderen was the 66th edition of the Dwars door Vlaanderen cycle race and was held on 23 March 2011. The race started in Roeselare and finished in Waregem. The race was won by Nick Nuyens.

== General classification ==
Final general classification

| Rank | Rider | Time |
|---|---|---|
| 1 | Nick Nuyens (BEL) | 4h 39' 55" |
| 2 | Geraint Thomas (GBR) | + 0" |
| 3 | Tyler Farrar (USA) | + 0" |
| 4 | Mathew Hayman (AUS) | + 0" |
| 5 | Baden Cooke (AUS) | + 0" |
| 6 | Marco Marcato (ITA) | + 0" |
| 7 | Leif Hoste (BEL) | + 0" |
| 8 | Tom Leezer (NED) | + 0" |
| 9 | Tom Boonen (BEL) | + 0" |
| 10 | Dominique Rollin (CAN) | + 0" |
