= 2004 Gent–Wevelgem =

Race details
- Dates: 7 April 2004
- Stages: 1
- Distance: 208 km (129 mi)
- Winning time: 4h 58' 47"

Results
	Winner	Tom Boonen (BEL)	(Quick-Step–Davitamon)
	Second	Magnus Bäckstedt (SWE)	(Alessio–Bianchi)
	Third	Jaan Kirsipuu (ESP)	(AG2R Prévoyance)

The 66th edition of the Belgian Gent–Wevelgem cycling classic race was held over 208 kilometres from Deinze to Wevelgem on Wednesday 7 April 2004. There were a total of 186 competitors, of whom 56 finished. The race was won by Belgium's Tom Boonen of the Quick-Step–Davitamon team.

== Final classification ==
Rank	Rider	Team	Time
1	Tom Boonen (BEL)	Quick-Step–Davitamon	4h 58' 47"
2	Magnus Bäckstedt (SWE)	Alessio–Bianchi	s.t.
3	Jaan Kirsipuu (EST)	AG2R Prévoyance	s.t.
4	George Hincapie (USA)	U.S. Postal Service	s.t.
5	Jimmy Casper (FRA)	Cofidis	s.t.
6	Roger Hammond (GBR)	Mr. Bookmaker–Palmans–Collstrop	s.t.
7	Juan Antonio Flecha (ESP)	Fassa Bortolo	s.t.
8	Vladimir Gusev (RUS)	Team CSC	s.t.
9	Sébastien Rosseler (BEL)	Relax–Bodysol	s.t.
10	Andreas Klier (GER)	T-Mobile Team	s.t.
