= 2007 Dwars door Vlaanderen =

Race details
- Dates: 28 March 2007
- Stages: 1
- Distance: 200 km (124.3 mi)
- Winning time: 4h 47' 00"

Results
	Winner	Tom Boonen (BEL)
	Second	Niko Eeckhout (BEL)
	Third	Stuart O'Grady (AUS)

The 2007 Dwars door Vlaanderen was the 62nd edition of the Dwars door Vlaanderen cycle race and was held on 28 March 2007. The race started in Roeselare and finished in Waregem. The race was won by Tom Boonen.

== General classification ==
Final general classification

Rank	Rider	Time
1	Tom Boonen (BEL)	4h 47' 00"
2	Niko Eeckhout (BEL)	+ 0"
3	Stuart O'Grady (AUS)	+ 0"
4	Mathew Hayman (AUS)	+ 0"
5	David Kopp (GER)	+ 0"
6	Tomas Vaitkus (LTU)	+ 0"
7	William Bonnet (FRA)	+ 0"
8	Wouter Weylandt (BEL)	+ 0"
9	Lars Michaelsen (DEN)	+ 0"
10	Murilo Fischer (BRA)	+ 0"
