= 2006 Dwars door Vlaanderen =

Race details
- Dates: 22 March 2006
- Stages: 1
- Distance: 204 km (126.8 mi)
- Winning time: 5h 13' 20"

Results
	Winner	Frederik Veuchelen (BEL)
	Second	Jeremy Hunt (GBR)
	Third	Lloyd Mondory (FRA)

The 2006 Dwars door Vlaanderen was the 61st edition of the Dwars door Vlaanderen cycle race and was held on 22 March 2006. The race started in Kortrijk and finished in Waregem. The race was won by Frederik Veuchelen.

The race was characterized by Tom Boonen who was training himself for the big (Flemish) monuments to come (RVV, E3, P-R, ...); according to many this was one of his best performances in a single-day race ever, even though he did not win. When asked afterwards why he was showing off his magnificent shape he replied: "T'is Lente Schat" [spring has begun], two weeks later he won RVV in his rainbow jersey.

== General classification ==
Final general classification

Rank	Rider	Time
1	Frederik Veuchelen (BEL)	5h 13' 20"
2	Jeremy Hunt (GBR)	+ 2"
3	Lloyd Mondory (FRA)	+ 2"
4	Niko Eeckhout (BEL)	+ 2"
5	Tom Boonen (BEL)	+ 2"
6	Igor Abakoumov (BEL)	+ 2"
7	Marcus Burghardt (GER)	+ 2"
8	Kurt Asle Arvesen (NOR)	+ 2"
9	Sven Renders (BEL)	+ 2"
10	Aart Vierhouten (NED)	+ 2"
