= 2006 Scheldeprijs =

2005–06 UCI Europe Tour

Race details
- Dates: 12 April 2006
- Distance: 200 km (124.3 mi)
- Winning time: 4h 31' 00"

Results
	Winner	Tom Boonen (BEL)	(Quick-Step–Innergetic)
	Second	Steven de Jongh (NED)	(Quick-Step–Innergetic)
	Third	Gert Steegmans (BEL)	(Davitamon–Lotto)

The 2006 Scheldeprijs was the 94th edition of the Scheldeprijs road cycling one-day race, held on 12 April 2006 as part of the 2005–06 UCI Europe Tour, as a 1.HC categorized race.

Due to very strong crosswinds, after only a few kilometers a group of 25 riders managed to break away from the main bunch and this group would continue until the finish. The peloton was behind by such a large distance that it was taken out of the race going into the local laps. With Quick-Step–Innergetic present by no less than seven riders in the lead group, including sprinter Tom Boonen, the team guided him to the finish line and lead him out to finish. Boonen, wearing the rainbow jersey as the incumbent world champion, won the race in a bunch sprint, with teammate Steven de Jongh even securing second place, while compatriot Gert Steegmans (Davitamon–Lotto) completed the podium. Boonen was the first incumbent world champion to win the race since Eddy Merckx in 1972. Eventually, only 22 riders finished the race.

== Teams ==
Twenty-one teams were invited to take part in the race.

Competing teams

- AG2R Prévoyance
- Chocolade Jacques–Topsport Vlaanderen
- Davitamon–Lotto
- Intel–Action
- Jartazi–7Mobile
- Landbouwkrediet–Colnago
- Liquigas
- Team Milram
- Navigators Insurance
- Quick-Step–Innergetic
- Rabobank
- Skil–Shimano
- Tenax–Salmilano
- Unibet.com
- Wiesenhof–AKUD
- Flanders
- Gianni Riemslagh
- Naturino–Sapore di Mare
- Pictoflex–Bikeland–Hyundai
- Profel–Ziegler
- Yawadoo–Colba–ABM

== Result ==
Result
Rank	Rider	Team	Time
1	Tom Boonen (BEL)	Quick-Step–Innergetic	4h 31' 00"
2	Steven de Jongh (NED)	Quick-Step–Innergetic	+ 0"
3	Gert Steegmans (BEL)	Davitamon–Lotto	+ 0"
4	Niko Eeckhout (BEL)	Chocolade Jacques–Topsport Vlaanderen	+ 0"
5	Graeme Brown (AUS)	Rabobank	+ 0"
6	Enrico Gasparotto (ITA)	Liquigas	+ 0"
7	Jens Renders (BEL)	Chocolade Jacques–Topsport Vlaanderen	+ 0"
8	Aart Vierhouten (NED)	Skil–Shimano	+ 0"
9	Jeremy Hunt (GBR)	Unibet.com	+ 0"
10	René Weissinger (GER)	Skil–Shimano	+ 0"
