= 2017 Scheldeprijs =

2017 UCI Europe Tour

Race details
- Dates: 5 April 2017
- Stages: 1
- Distance: 203 km (126.1 mi)
- Winning time: 4h 35' 25"

Results
	Winner	Marcel Kittel (GER)	(Quick-Step Floors)
	Second	Elia Viviani (ITA)	(Team Sky)
	Third	Nacer Bouhanni (FRA)	(Cofidis)

The 2017 Scheldeprijs was the 105th edition of the Scheldeprijs road cycling one day race, held on 5 April 2017 as part of the 2017 UCI Europe Tour, as a 1.HC categorised race. The event was noted for being the last official race of Belgian cyclist Tom Boonen on Belgian soil; as such, the race started in Boonen's home town of Mol instead of its usual start in Antwerp, but finished as customary in Schoten.

German rider Marcel Kittel of Quick-Step Floors won the event for the fifth time in a bunch sprint, further extending his race record; he finished ahead of Italian Elia Viviani (Team Sky) and French sprinter Nacer Bouhanni from the Cofidis team.

== Teams ==
Twenty-two teams were invited to take part in the race. These included fourteen UCI WorldTeams and eight UCI Professional Continental teams.

UCI WorldTeams

- AG2R La Mondiale
- Astana
- Bahrain–Merida
- Bora–Hansgrohe
- Cannondale–Drapac
- Team Dimension Data
- FDJ
- Team Katusha–Alpecin
- LottoNL–Jumbo
- Lotto–Soudal
- Quick-Step Floors
- Team Sky
- Team Sunweb
- Trek–Segafredo

UCI Professional Continental Teams

- Cofidis
- Roompot–Nederlandse Loterij
- Sport Vlaanderen–Baloise
- Vérandas Willems–Crelan
- Wanty–Groupe Gobert
- WB Veranclassic Aqua Protect
- Wilier Triestina–Selle Italia
- Fortuneo–Vital Concept

== Result ==
Result
Rank	Rider	Team	Time
1	Marcel Kittel (GER)	Quick-Step Floors	4h 35' 25"
2	Elia Viviani (ITA)	Team Sky	+ 0"
3	Nacer Bouhanni (FRA)	Cofidis	+ 0"
4	Jürgen Roelandts (BEL)	Lotto–Soudal	+ 0"
5	Pascal Ackermann (GER)	Bora–Hansgrohe	+ 0"
6	Rudy Barbier (FRA)	AG2R La Mondiale	+ 0"
7	Reinardt Janse van Rensburg (RSA)	Team Dimension Data	+ 0"
8	Marc Sarreau (FRA)	FDJ	+ 0"
9	Ramon Sinkeldam (NED)	Team Sunweb	+ 0"
10	Jonas van Genechten (BEL)	Cofidis	+ 0"
