= 2005 Dwars door Vlaanderen =

60th edition of the Dwars door Vlaanderen cycle race

Race details
- Dates: 23 March 2005
- Stages: 1
- Distance: 202 km (125.5 mi)
- Winning time: 4h 43' 15"

Results
	Winner	Niko Eeckhout (BEL)
	Second	Roger Hammond (GBR)
	Third	Gabriele Balducci (ITA)

The 2005 Dwars door Vlaanderen was the 60th edition of the Dwars door Vlaanderen cycle race and was held on 23 March 2005. The race started in Kortrijk and finished in Waregem. The race was won by Niko Eeckhout.

== General classification ==
Final general classification

Rank	Rider	Time
1	Niko Eeckhout (BEL)	4h 43' 15"
2	Roger Hammond (GBR)	+ 0"
3	Gabriele Balducci (ITA)	+ 0"
4	Marcus Burghardt (GER)	+ 0"
5	Baden Cooke (AUS)	+ 0"
6	Nick Nuyens (BEL)	+ 0"
7	Aart Vierhouten (NED)	+ 0"
8	Mathew Hayman (AUS)	+ 8"
9	Nico Mattan (BEL)	+ 46"
10	Alexandre Usov (BLR)	+ 1' 04"
