= 2002 Gent–Wevelgem =

Race details
- Dates: 10 April 2002
- Stages: 1
- Distance: 214 km (133 mi)
- Winning time: 4h 39' 00"

Results
	Winner	Mario Cipollini (ITA)	(Acqua & Sapone–Cantina Tollo)
	Second	Fred Rodriguez (USA)	(Domo–Farm Frites)
	Third	George Hincapie (USA)	(U.S. Postal Service)

The 64th edition of the Belgian Gent–Wevelgem cycling classic race was held over 214 kilometres from Gent to Wevelgem on Wednesday 10 April 2002. There were 193 competitors, of whom 85 finished. It was won by Italy's Mario Cipollini of the Acqua & Sapone–Cantina Tollo team.

== Final classification ==
Rank	Rider	Team	Time
1	Mario Cipollini (ITA)	Acqua & Sapone–Cantina Tollo	4h 39' 00"
2	Fred Rodriguez (USA)	Domo–Farm Frites	s.t.
3	George Hincapie (USA)	U.S. Postal Service	s.t.
4	Hendrik Van Dyck (BEL)	Palmans–Collstrop	s.t.
5	Martin Hvastija (SLO)	Alessio	+ 10"
6	Robert Hunter (RSA)	Mapei–Quick-Step	+ 1' 29"
7	Tom Boonen (BEL)	U.S. Postal Service	s.t.
8	Erik Zabel (GER)	Team Telekom	s.t.
9	Tristan Hoffman (NED)	CSC–Tiscali	s.t.
10	Johan Museeuw (BEL)	Domo–Farm Frites	s.t.
