= 2008 Dwars door Vlaanderen =

- Event poster with previous winner Tom Boonen

Race details
- Dates: 26 March 2008
- Stages: 1
- Distance: 200 km (120 mi)
- Winning time: 4h 32' 27"

Results
| | Winner | Sylvain Chavanel (FRA) |
| | Second | Steven de Jongh (NED) |
| | Third | Niko Eeckhout (BEL) |

The 2008 Dwars door Vlaanderen was the 63rd edition of the Dwars door Vlaanderen cycle race and was held on 26 March 2008. The race started in Roeselare and finished in Waregem. The race was won by Sylvain Chavanel.

== General classification ==
Final general classification

| Rank | Rider | Time |
|---|---|---|
| 1 | Sylvain Chavanel (FRA) | 4h 32' 27" |
| 2 | Steven de Jongh (NED) | + 28" |
| 3 | Niko Eeckhout (BEL) | + 28" |
| 4 | Andreas Klier (GER) | + 28" |
| 5 | Allan Johansen (DEN) | + 28" |
| 6 | Gorik Gardeyn (BEL) | + 28" |
| 7 | Martin Elmiger (SUI) | + 28" |
| 8 | Gennady Mikhaylov (RUS) | + 28" |
| 9 | Joost Posthuma (NED) | + 28" |
| 10 | Nick Nuyens (BEL) | + 28" |
