= 2010 Scheldeprijs =

Race details
- Dates: 7 April 2010
- Stages: 1
- Distance: 205,400 km (127,600 mi)
- Winning time: 4h29min

Results
	Winner	Tyler Farrar (USA)	(Garmin–Transitions)
	Second	Robbie McEwen (AUS)	(Team Katusha)
	Third	Robert Förster (GER)	(Team Milram)

The 2010 Scheldeprijs cycling race took place on 7 April 2010. It was the 98th time the Scheldeprijs was run. The peloton took on a high pace from the start, completing 50 kilometers during the first hour. After 56 kilometres 8 cyclists formed a breakaway: Jonas Ljungblad (Omega Pharma–Lotto), Mathew Hayman (Team Sky), Jackson Stewart (BMC Racing Team), David Boucher (Landbouwkrediet), Arnoud van Groen (Vacansoleil), Cyril Lemoine (Saur–Sojasun), Gregory Joseph (Topsport Vlaanderen–Mercator) and Niko Eeckhout (An Post–Sean Kelly). The group obtained a lead of up to six minutes over the peloton. After 168 kilometres Jackson Stewart was dropped from the lead group and with 192 kilometres gone, only Mathew Hayman, Niko Eeckhout, Jonas Ljungblad, Arnoud van Groen and Cyril Lemoine were left although they were all caught just a few kilometres further. It the end it turned out to become a bunch sprint, in which Tyler Farrar (Garmin-Transitions) was fastest by far. He won the 98th Scheldeprijs ahead of Robbie McEwen (Team Katusha) and Robert Förster (Team Milram).

== Results ==
	Cyclist	Team	Time
1	Tyler Farrar (USA)	Garmin–Transitions	4h 29' 00"
2	Robbie McEwen (AUS)	Team Katusha	s.t.
3	Robert Förster (GER)	Team Milram	s.t.
4	Greg Henderson (NZL)	Team Sky	s.t.
5	Wouter Weylandt (BEL)	Quick-Step	s.t.
6	Enrico Rossi (ITA)	Ceramica Flaminia	s.t.
7	Kris Boeckmans (BEL)	Topsport Vlaanderen–Mercator	s.t.
8	Jimmy Casper (FRA)	Saur–Sojasun	s.t.
9	Loyd Mondory (FRA)	Ag2r–La Mondiale	s.t.
10	Alexander Kristoff (NOR)	BMC Racing Team	s.t.
