= 2003 Omloop Het Volk =

Race details
- Dates: 1 March 2003
- Stages: 1
- Distance: 200 km (120 mi)
- Winning time: 5h 01' 15"

Results
	Winner	Johan Museeuw (BEL)
	Second	Max van Heeswijk (NED)
	Third	Paolo Bettini (ITA)

The 2003 Omloop Het Volk was the 57th edition of the Omloop Het Volk cycle race and was held on 1 March 2003. The race started in Ghent and finished in Lokeren. The race was won by Johan Museeuw.

== General classification ==
Final general classification
Rank	Rider	Time
1	Johan Museeuw (BEL)	5h 01' 15"
2	Max van Heeswijk (NED)	+ 14"
3	Paolo Bettini (ITA)	+ 14"
4	Frank Vandenbroucke (BEL)	+ 1' 33"
5	Tom Boonen (BEL)	+ 1' 33"
6	Filippo Pozzato (ITA)	+ 2' 36"
7	Peter Farazijn (BEL)	+ 2' 36"
8	Romāns Vainšteins (LAT)	+ 3' 32"
9	Gabriele Balducci (ITA)	+ 3' 32"
10	Robbie McEwen (AUS)	+ 3' 32"
