= 2007 E3 Prijs Vlaanderen =

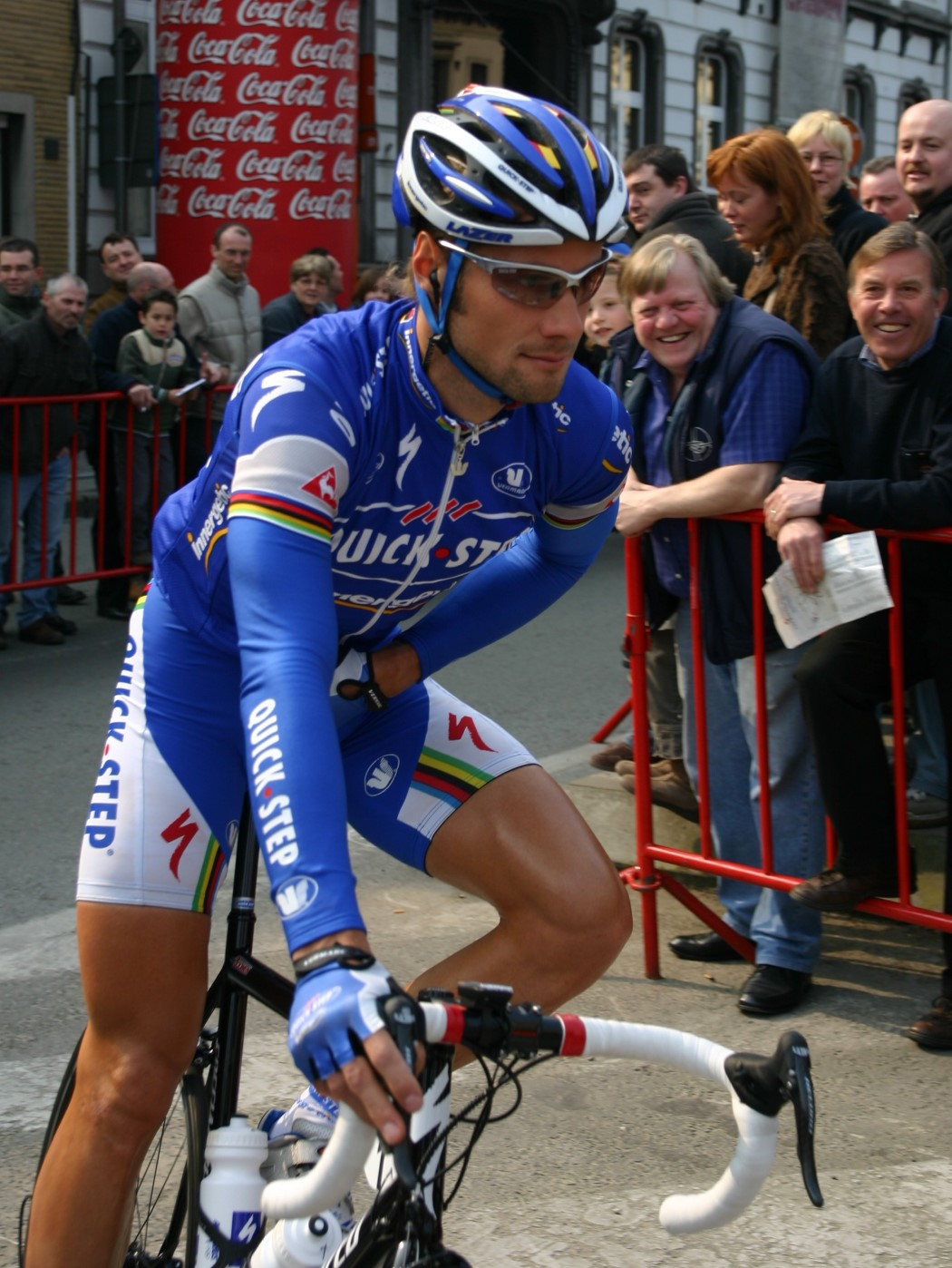
- Tom Boonen after the race

Race details
- Dates: 31 March 2007
- Stages: 1
- Distance: 203 km (126 mi)
- Winning time: 4h 55' 36"

Results
	Winner	Tom Boonen (BEL)	(Quick-Step–Innergetic)
	Second	Fabian Cancellara (SUI)	(Team CSC)
	Third	Marcus Burghardt (GER)	(T-Mobile Team)

The 2007 E3 Prijs Vlaanderen was the 50th edition of the E3 Harelbeke cycle race and was held on 31 March 2007. The race started and finished in Harelbeke. The race was won by Tom Boonen of the Quick-Step team. Suffering from hand cramps, he wasn't able to raise his hands when arriving.

== General classification ==
Final general classification

Rank	Rider	Team	Time
1	Tom Boonen (BEL)	Quick-Step–Innergetic	4h 55' 36"
2	Fabian Cancellara (SUI)	Team CSC	+ 0"
3	Marcus Burghardt (GER)	T-Mobile Team	+ 0"
4	Manuel Quinziato (ITA)	Liquigas	+ 0"
5	Allan Johansen (DEN)	Team CSC	+ 42"
6	Roy Sentjens (NED)	Predictor–Lotto	+ 46"
7	Philippe Gilbert (BEL)	Française des Jeux	+ 46"
8	Baden Cooke (AUS)	Unibet.com	+ 46"
9	Stuart O'Grady (AUS)	Team CSC	+ 46"
10	Alessandro Ballan (ITA)	Lampre–Fondital	+ 46"
