= 2005 E3 Prijs Vlaanderen =

Race details
- Dates: 26 March 2005
- Stages: 1
- Distance: 200 km (120 mi)
- Winning time: 4h 42' 54"

Results
	Winner	Tom Boonen (BEL)	(Quick-Step–Innergetic)
	Second	Andreas Klier (GER)	(T-Mobile Team)
	Third	Peter Van Petegem (BEL)	(Davitamon–Lotto)

The 2005 E3 Prijs Vlaanderen was the 48th edition of the E3 Harelbeke cycle race and was held on 26 March 2005. The race started and finished in Harelbeke. The race was won by Tom Boonen of the Quick-Step team.

== General classification ==
Final general classification

Rank	Rider	Team	Time
1	Tom Boonen (BEL)	Quick-Step–Innergetic	4h 42' 54"
2	Andreas Klier (GER)	T-Mobile Team	+ 0"
3	Peter Van Petegem (BEL)	Davitamon–Lotto	+ 13"
4	David Kopp (GER)	Team Wiesenhof	+ 17"
5	Nico Mattan (BEL)	Davitamon–Lotto	+ 17"
6	Steffen Wesemann (SUI)	T-Mobile Team	+ 22"
7	Erik Dekker (NED)	Rabobank	+ 33"
8	Jeremy Hunt (GBR)	MrBookmaker.com–SportsTech	+ 2' 50"
9	Eric Baumann (GER)	T-Mobile Team	+ 2' 50"
10	Lars Michaelsen (DEN)	Team CSC	+ 2' 50"
