= 2003 E3 Prijs Vlaanderen =

Race details
- Dates: 29 March 2003
- Stages: 1
- Distance: 209 km (130 mi)
- Winning time: 4h 33' 00"

Results
	Winner	Steven de Jongh (NED)	(Rabobank)
	Second	Steffen Wesemann (SUI)	(Team Telekom)
	Third	Stijn Devolder (BEL)	(Vlaanderen–T Interim)

The 2003 E3 Prijs Vlaanderen was the 46th edition of the E3 Harelbeke cycle race and was held on 29 March 2003. The race started and finished in Harelbeke. The race was won by Steven de Jongh of the Rabobank team.

== General classification ==
Final general classification

Rank	Rider	Team	Time
1	Steven de Jongh (NED)	Rabobank	4h 33' 00"
2	Steffen Wesemann (SUI)	Team Telekom	+ 0"
3	Stijn Devolder (BEL)	Vlaanderen–T Interim	+ 0"
4	Raivis Belohvoščiks (LAT)	Marlux–Wincor Nixdorf	+ 4"
5	Frédéric Guesdon (FRA)	FDJeux.com	+ 4"
6	Enrico Cassani (ITA)	Alessio	+ 4"
7	Jaan Kirsipuu (EST)	AG2R Prévoyance	+ 26"
8	Jans Koerts (NED)	BankGiroLoterij	+ 26"
9	Jo Planckaert (BEL)	Cofidis	+ 26"
10	Max van Heeswijk (NED)	U.S. Postal Service	+ 26"
