= List of career achievements by Fabian Cancellara =

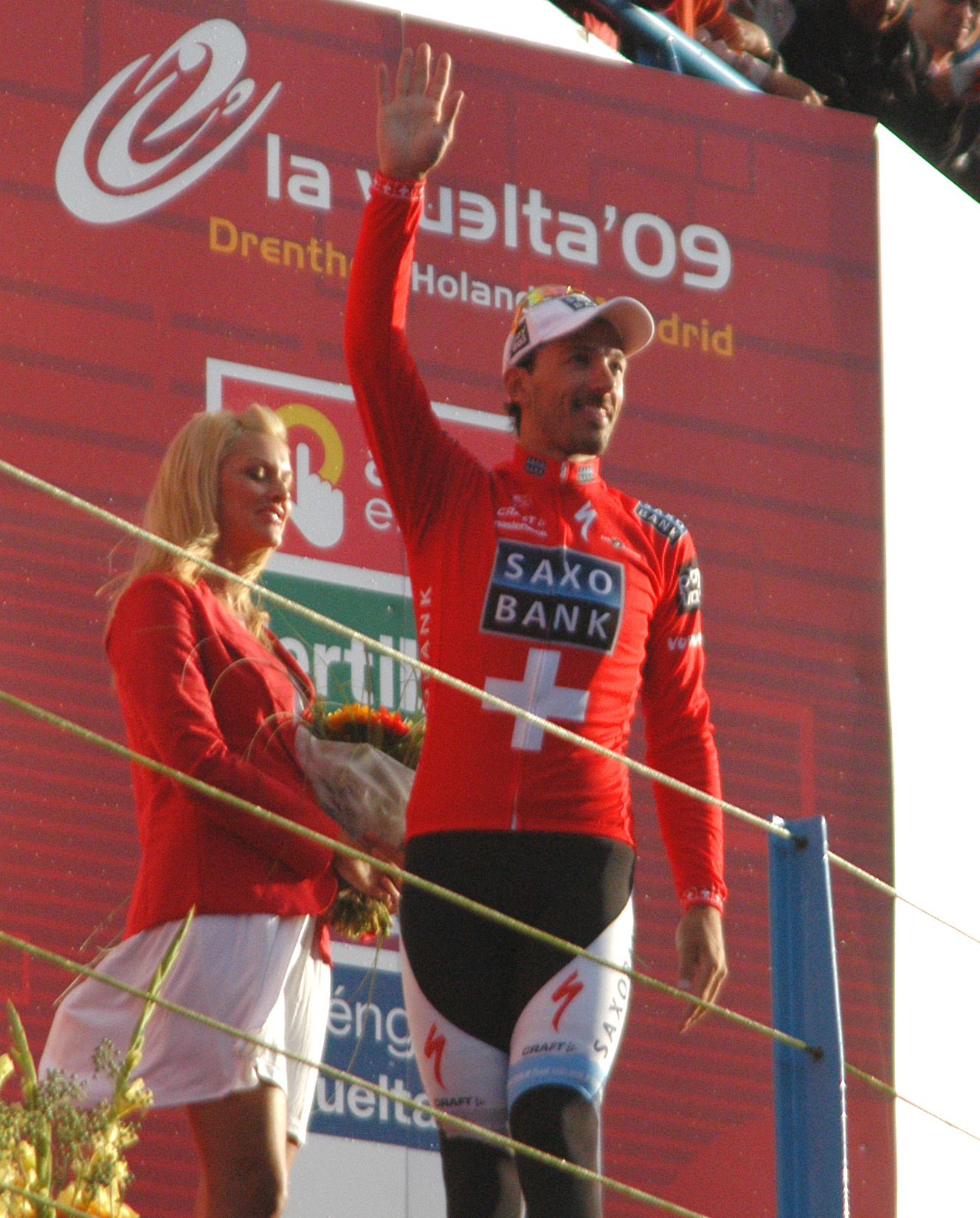
Fabian Cancellara after his victory in the individual time trial of the first stage at the 2009 Vuelta a España, wearing the Swiss national time trial champion's jersey

This is a list of career achievements by Fabian Cancellara, a Swiss former professional racing cyclist. During his professional career, Cancellara was known for being a quality time trialist, a classics specialist, and a workhorse for his teammates that had general classification aspirations. Cancellara achieved great successes in the classics; he won Paris–Roubaix three times, Milan–San Remo once, and the Tour of Flanders three times. Cancellara won the opening stage of the Tour de France five times and led the race for 29 days total, the most of any rider to not win the Tour. His success was not limited to just time trials and classics, as he has won the general classification of the Tirreno–Adriatico, Tour de Suisse, and the Tour of Oman. In 2008, he won gold in the individual time trial and silver in the men's road race at the Summer Olympics. In 2016, he won Olympic gold in the individual time trial for the second time in his career. In addition, Cancellara was time trial world champion four times in his career.

== Career highlights ==
2006

- Cancellara wins Paris–Roubaix, the first Swiss rider to do so since Heiri Suter in 1923.

2007

- After two previous prologue stage wins in 2004 and earlier in the 2007 edition, Cancellara wins his first road stage at the Tour de France, out-sprinting the main sprinters in the peloton into Compiègne.

2008

- Cancellara wins his second Monument classic at Milan–San Remo, breaking away from the leading group in the final kilometres.
- Cancellara wins the gold medal in the road time trial event of the Olympics in Beijing, finishing over half a minute of his closest rival.

2009

- Cancellara wins two of the three individual time trial stages at the Vuelta a España, holding the race leader's gold jersey for five days.
- Cancellara wins a record-equalling third world time trial championships on home soil in Mendrisio. Winning the gold medal by almost a minute and a half, Cancellara free-wheeled the final 200 metres saluting the crowd.

2010

- Cancellara drops Tom Boonen on the Muur van Geraardsbergen, en route to victory at the Tour of Flanders. By winning the Tour of Flanders, Cancellara became the twelfth cyclist to win the opening three Monuments of the cycling year – Milan–San Remo, Tour of Flanders, and the Paris–Roubaix – in a career.
- Matching his compatriot Heiri Suter's feat from 1923, Cancellara follows up his Tour of Flanders victory with success at Paris–Roubaix.
- Cancellara sets a new record for world time trial titles, with his fourth coming in Geelong, Australia.

2012

- During the Tour de France, Cancellara sets a new record for most days spent in the maillot jaune of the general classification leader for a rider not to have won the Tour de France general classification, surpassing René Vietto's tally of 26 days.

2013

- As he did in 2010, Cancellara wins both the Tour of Flanders and Paris–Roubaix.

2014

- Cancellara wins a four-rider sprint to win his second consecutive Tour of Flanders. His third victory in the race, and a seventh Monument overall, also made him the sixth rider to achieve the feat.

2016

- Cancellara wins Strade Bianche, a race that includes sectors of gravel roads similar to the cobbles of Paris–Roubaix, for the third time. As a result of his success, a sector of the gravel roads was named in his honour.
- Cancellara takes his tenth victory at the Swiss National Time Trial Championships in Martigny.
- Cancellara wins the gold medal in the road time trial event of the Olympics in Rio de Janeiro, finishing 47 seconds of his closest rival. This was his 75th and final professional win.

== Major results ==
1997
2nd Road race, European Youth Summer Olympic Days
2nd Road race, National Novice Road Championships
1998
1st Time trial, UCI Junior Road World Championships
1999
1st Time trial, UCI Junior Road World Championships
1st Road race, National Junior Road Championships
1st Overall Course de la Paix Juniors
2000
1st Time trial, National Under-23 Road Championships
1st Gran Premio Palio del Recioto
2nd Time trial, UCI Under-23 Road World Championships
4th Time trial, UEC European Under-23 Road Championships
10th Overall Circuit Franco-Belge
2001
1st Overall Tour of Rhodes

1st Prologue

2nd Time trial, National Road Championships
2nd Grand Prix Eddy Merckx (with Michael Rogers)
2nd Duo Normand (with Michael Rogers)
5th Berner Rundfahrt
2002 (7 pro wins)
1st Time trial, National Road Championships
1st Overall GP Erik Breukink

1st Young rider classification
1st Stage 3b (ITT)

1st Overall Tour of Rhodes

1st Prologue

1st Grand Prix Eddy Merckx (with László Bodrogi)
1st ZLM Tour
1st Stage 1a (ITT) Tour of Austria
1st Stage 3 (ITT) Ytong Bohemia Tour
2nd Chrono des Herbiers
6th Overall Circuit des Mines
7th Berner Rundfahrt
8th Stausee-Rundfahrt Klingnau
8th Grand Prix des Nations
9th Time trial, UCI Road World Championships
9th CSC Classic
2003 (3)
Tour de Romandie

1st Points classification
1st Prologue

1st Prologue Tour de Suisse
1st Stage 4 (ITT) Tour of Belgium
1st Stage 6 (TTT) Tour Méditerranéen
4th Overall Ronde van Nederland

1st Young rider classification

8th Overall Three Days of De Panne

1st Young rider classification

9th Overall Deutschland Tour
9th Grand Prix des Nations
2004 (5)
1st Time trial, National Road Championships
Tour de France

1st Prologue
Held after Prologue

1st Stage 1 Setmana Catalana de Ciclisme
1st Stage 4 (ITT) Tour de Luxembourg
1st Stage 4 Tour of Qatar
4th Overall Three Days of De Panne

1st Young rider classification

4th Paris–Roubaix
4th Firenze–Pistoia
8th Time trial, UCI Road World Championships
9th Time trial, Olympic Games
2005 (4)
1st Time trial, National Road Championships
1st Stage 4 Paris–Nice
1st Stage 5 (ITT) Setmana Catalana de Ciclisme
2nd Overall Tour de Luxembourg

1st Stage 3b (ITT)

3rd Time trial, UCI Road World Championships
4th Gent–Wevelgem
4th HEW Cyclassics
7th Chrono des Herbiers
8th Paris–Roubaix
2006 (8)
1st Time trial, UCI Road World Championships
1st Time trial, National Road Championships
1st Overall Danmark Rundt

1st Stages 2 & 5 (ITT)

1st Paris–Roubaix
1st Stage 1 (ITT) Volta a Catalunya
1st Stage 5 (ITT) Tirreno–Adriatico
1st Stage 1 (TTT) Vuelta a España
2nd LuK Challenge Chrono (with Fränk Schleck)
5th Züri-Metzgete
6th Tour of Flanders
6th Gent–Wevelgem
2007 (6)
1st Time trial, UCI Road World Championships
National Road Championships

1st Time trial
2nd Road race

Tour de France

1st Prologue & Stage 3
Held from Stages 1–6

Tour de Suisse

1st Prologue & Stage 9 (ITT)

1st Stage 2 (TTT) Deutschland Tour
2nd E3 Prijs Vlaanderen
2008 (11)
Olympic Games

1st Time trial
2nd Road race

1st Time trial, National Road Championships
1st Overall Tirreno–Adriatico

1st Stage 5 (ITT)

1st Milan–San Remo
1st Monte Paschi Eroica Strade Bianche
Tour de Suisse

1st Points classification
1st Stages 7 & 9

1st Stage 20 (ITT) Tour de France
1st Prologue Tour de Luxembourg
1st Stage 1 (TTT) Tour de Pologne
2nd Paris–Roubaix
4th Overall Tour of California

1st Prologue

2009 (9)
UCI Road World Championships

1st Time trial
5th Road race

1st Road race, National Road Championships
1st Overall Tour de Suisse

1st Points classification
1st Stages 1 (ITT) & 9 (ITT)

Tour de France

1st Stage 1 (ITT)
Held from Stages 1–6

Vuelta a España

1st Stages 1 (ITT) & 7 (ITT)
Held from Stages 1–4 & 7

1st Prologue Tour of California
2010 (8)
1st Time trial, UCI Road World Championships
1st Overall Tour of Oman
1st Paris–Roubaix
1st Tour of Flanders
1st E3 Prijs Vlaanderen
Tour de France

1st Prologue & Stage 19 (ITT)
Held for Stages 1, 3–6

1st Stage 1 (ITT) Tour de Suisse
2011 (6)
1st Road race, National Road Championships
1st E3 Prijs Vlaanderen
Tour de Suisse

1st Stages 1 (ITT) & 9 (ITT)

1st Stage 7 (ITT) Tirreno–Adriatico
1st Prologue Tour de Luxembourg
1st Stage 1 (TTT) Vuelta a España
2nd Milan–San Remo
2nd Paris–Roubaix
UCI Road World Championships

3rd Time trial
4th Road race

3rd Tour of Flanders
5th Montepaschi Strade Bianche
6th Overall Tour of Oman
2012 (4)
National Road Championships

1st Time trial
3rd Road race

1st Strade Bianche
Tour de France

1st Prologue
Held from Stages 1–6

1st Stage 7 (ITT) Tirreno–Adriatico
2nd Milan–San Remo
7th Time trial, Olympic Games
7th Overall Tour of Qatar
10th Overall Tour of Oman
2013 (6)
1st Time trial, National Road Championships
1st Tour of Flanders
1st Paris–Roubaix
1st E3 Harelbeke
1st Stage 11 (ITT) Vuelta a España
1st Stage 7 (ITT) Tour of Austria
UCI Road World Championships

3rd Time trial
10th Road race

3rd Milan–San Remo
4th Strade Bianche
7th UCI World Tour
2014 (2)
1st Time trial, National Road Championships
1st Tour of Flanders
2nd Milan–San Remo
3rd Paris–Roubaix
5th Overall Dubai Tour
6th Strade Bianche
9th E3 Harelbeke
2015 (2)
1st Stage 7 (ITT) Tirreno–Adriatico
1st Stage 2 Tour of Oman
7th Milan–San Remo
7th Trofeo Playa de Palma
Tour de France

Held after Stage 2

2016 (7)
1st Time trial, Olympic Games
1st Time trial, National Road Championships
1st Strade Bianche
1st Trofeo Serra de Tramuntana
1st Stage 7 (ITT) Tirreno–Adriatico
1st Stage 1 (ITT) Tour de Suisse
1st Stage 3 (ITT) Volta ao Algarve
2nd Tour of Flanders
4th E3 Harelbeke
4th Gent–Wevelgem
6th Trofeo Pollença
7th Overall Dubai Tour

=== General classification results timeline ===
Grand Tour general classification results
Grand Tour	2003	2004	2005	2006	2007	2008	2009	2010	2011	2012	2013	2014	2015	2016
Giro d'Italia	—	—	—	—	DNF	—	DNF	—	—	—	—	—	—	DNF
Tour de France	—	109	128	—	100	64	88	121	119	DNF	—	DNF	DNF	DNF
Vuelta a España	—	—	—	DNF	—	—	DNF	DNF	DNF	—	DNF	DNF	DNF	—
Major stage race general classification results timeline
Race	2003	2004	2005	2006	2007	2008	2009	2010	2011	2012	2013	2014	2015	2016
Paris–Nice	55	DNF	69	—	—	—	—	—	—	—	—	—	—	—
Tirreno–Adriatico	—	—	—	105	DNF	1	DNF	77	89	98	71	51	52	60
Volta a Catalunya	—	—	—	125	—	DNF	—	—	—	—	—	—	—	—
Tour of the Basque Country	Did not contest during his career													
Tour de Romandie	43	—	—	—	—	—	DNF	—	—	—	—	—	—	—
Critérium du Dauphiné	Did not contest during his career													
Tour de Suisse	56	63	72	94	83	79	1	55	98	DNF	105	DNF	113	DNF

=== Classics results timeline ===
Monument	2003	2004	2005	2006	2007	2008	2009	2010	2011	2012	2013	2014	2015	2016
Milan–San Remo	—	—	—	25	110	1	—	17	2	2	3	2	7	31
Tour of Flanders	73	42	62	6	53	23	DNF	1	3	DNF	1	1	—	2
Paris–Roubaix	DNF	4	8	1	19	2	49	1	2	—	1	3	—	40
Liège–Bastogne–Liège	Did not contest during his career													
Giro di Lombardia	Did not contest during his career													
Classic	2003	2004	2005	2006	2007	2008	2009	2010	2011	2012	2013	2014	2015	2016
Omloop Het Nieuwsblad	75	—	—	—	—	13	—	—	—	—	—	—	—	—
Kuurne–Brussels–Kuurne	—	12	—	—	—	—	—	—	—	—	NH	—	—	—
Strade Bianche	Race did not exist				—	1	—	10	5	1	4	6	19	1
E3 Harelbeke	—	—	—	37	2	16	—	1	1	22	1	9	DNF	4
Gent–Wevelgem	11	14	4	6	62	67	85	DNF	—	13	DNF	38	—	4
Amstel Gold Race	—	53	—	—	—	—	—	—	64	—	—	—	—	—
La Flèche Wallonne	Did not contest during his career													
Scheldeprijs	—	—	—	—	—	—	—	DNF	158	—	DNF	121	—	111

=== Major championships timeline ===
Event		2001	2002	2003	2004	2005	2006	2007	2008	2009	2010	2011	2012	2013	2014	2015	2016
Olympic Games	Time trial	Not held			9	Not held			1	Not held			7	Not held			1
Olympic Games	Road race	Not held			DNF	Not held			2	Not held			106	Not held			34
World Championships	Time trial	15	9	18	8	3	1	1	—	1	1	3	—	3	—	—	—
World Championships	Road race	—	148	DNF	DNF	123	31	DNF	—	5	50	4	—	10	11	—	—
National Championships	Time trial	2	1	—	1	1	1	1	1	—	—	—	1	1	1	DNS	1
National Championships	Road race	—	12	—	8	38	—	2	—	1	—	1	3	10	14	5	16

Legend
—	Did not compete
DNF	Did not finish
DNS	Did not start
NH	Not held

Critériums

2006
1st Schellenberg Rundfahrt
2007
1st Wiesbauer Rathauskriterium
1st Gala Tour de France
3rd Profronde Stiphout
2009
1st Profronde van Wateringen
2010
1st Criterium Aalst
3rd Natourcriterium Roeselare
2011
2nd Sykkelfestival Kristiansand
2014
2nd GP Stad Kortrijk
2016
1st GP Stad Kortrijk
1st Internationaal Criterium van Bavikhove

== Awards ==
- Vélo d'Or: 2010
