= Juan Antonio Flecha =

Argentine-Spanish cyclist (born 1977)

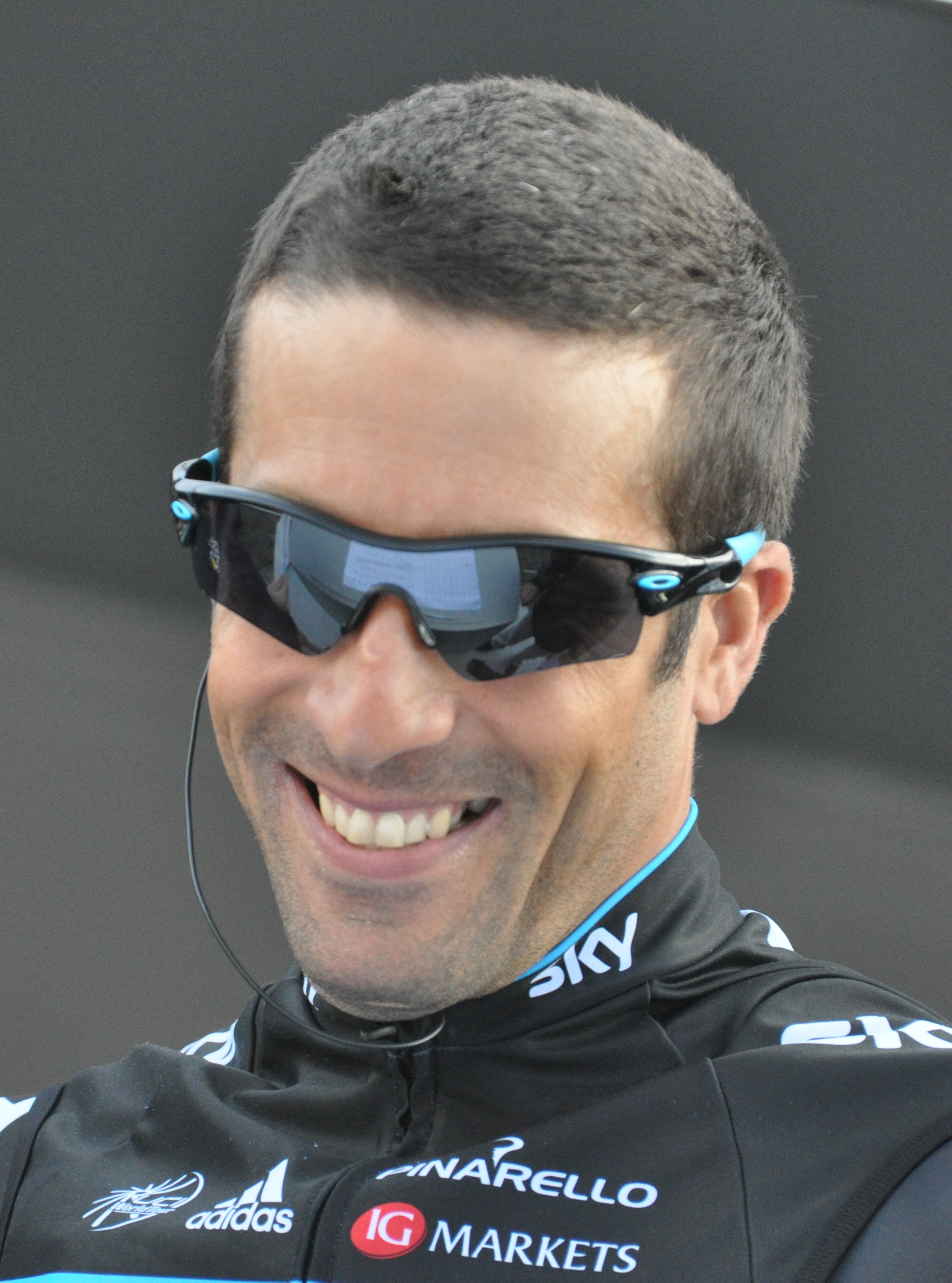
- Flecha in 2012.

Personal information
- Full name: Juan Antonio Flecha Giannoni
- Born: 17 September 1977 (age 49) Junín, Buenos Aires, Argentina
- Height: 1.81 m (5 ft 11 1/2 in)
- Weight: 72 kg (159 lb; 11 st 5 lb)

Cycling career
- Sport: Cycling
- Current team: Retired
- Discipline: Road
- Role: Rider
- Rider type: Classics specialist

Professional teams
- 2000–2001: Relax–Fuenlabrada
- 2002–2003: iBanesto.com
- 2004–2005: Fassa Bortolo
- 2006–2009: Rabobank
- 2010–2012: Team Sky
- 2013: Vacansoleil–DCM

Major wins
- Grand Tours Tour de France 1 individual stage (2003) Stage races Circuit Franco-Belge (2008) Single-day races and Classics Omloop Het Nieuwsblad (2010) Züri-Metzgete (2004)

Juan Antonio Flecha Giannoni (born 17 September 1977) is an Argentine-born Spanish former professional road bicycle racer, who competed as a professional between 2000 and 2013. Flecha had a reputation of being a Classics specialist and to ride with an aggressive style as he was keen on participating in breakaways. His major victories include winning a stage of the 2003 Tour de France, successes at the two defunct classics Züri-Metzgete and Giro del Lazio in 2004, and the Omloop Het Nieuwsblad in 2010. He was also known for his numerous high placings in important one-day races, most notably Paris–Roubaix, where he finished in the top ten eight times without registering the victory. In the Grand Tours, he was often assigned to a role of domestique.

== Early life ==
Flecha spent his early years in Argentina. His father died in a car accident when he was four years of age. He moved to Spain with his mother when he was eleven, where they lived in Sitges, near Barcelona.

== Professional Cycling Career ==
=== Early years ===
He gained fame in 2003 when he became the first rider born in Argentina to win a Tour de France stage while riding for iBanesto.com. As he rode across the finish line he performed a unique victory salute: he pantomimed releasing an arrow from a bow in homage to his family name ("Flecha" is the Spanish word for "arrow"). Although he said in a French interview, "Je dédie ma victoire a toute mon équipe", (I dedicate my victory to my whole team), it was also reported that he said after the race: "My win here is special, and it belongs to me and nobody else!"

The 2004 season saw him as a co-leader in the Italian Fassa Bortolo team for the Classics and one-day races, with notable finishes in various races from the Tour of Flanders, Paris–Roubaix and Liège–Bastogne–Liège, and victories in Züri-Metzgete and the Giro del Lazio. He often shared team leadership with Swiss rider Fabian Cancellara, with whom he said he was working very well. In Züri-Metzgete, he won a 30 rider bunch gallop in front of Italian Paolo Bettini. This victory helped him achieve the fifth position of the 2004 UCI Road World Cup, a classification that was calculated over ten major one-day races.

=== 2005 ===
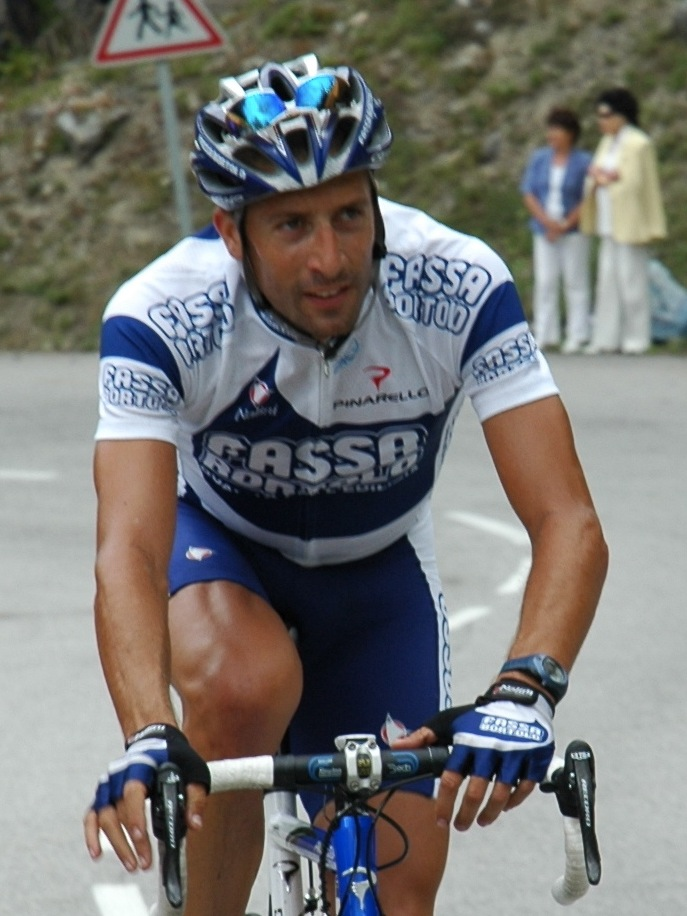
Flecha at the 2005 Tour de France with Fassa Bortolo

The following season with Fassa Bortolo in 2005 saw Flecha involved in a controversial finish at Gent–Wevelgem, where he had to settle for second. Nico Mattan of Davitamon–Lotto attacked the leading group with 9 kilometres (5.6 mi) left in the race and only Flecha and Baden Cooke (Française des Jeux) had the resources to follow. Flecha then placed an attack of his own and dropped the two men. It looked like he was on his way to success when Mattan got back to him in the last kilometer by using the slipstream produced by the race's cars, which is not allowed, and beat Flecha for the line. A couple of days later, he finished on the third step of the podium in Paris–Roubaix, a confirmation of his skills in the cobbled classics. He entered the Roubaix Velodrome with Tom Boonen and George Hincapie, but his sprinting speed was not sufficient to get the win. Euskaltel–Euskadi rider Egoi Martínez said in an interview that in a race "one should have a head and an attitude like the one Juan Antonio Flecha has", in tribute to his perseverance and positive attitude in racing.

When the Fassa Bortolo team closed down after the 2005 season, Flecha moved on to Dutch team Rabobank. In 2007, Flecha took 2nd in the prestigious Paris–Roubaix race by winning the sprint contested between the 4 riders who were chasing the winner, Aussie Stuart O'Grady (Team CSC).

=== 2008 ===
In the Vuelta a España, Flecha displayed his sense of humor as he stole the "Elk Man"'s American flag and rode playfully with it for 200 meters. In October, he grabbed his first victory since joining the Rabobank team in the four-stage race Circuit Franco-Belge. He was fourth at 18 seconds before heading in to the final stage, which was contested in heavy rain and cold temperatures. He escaped from a group of 24 riders with Sébastien Rosseler of Quick-Step and finished in second position of the stage, putting enough time between him and the former leader Jürgen Roelandts (Silence–Lotto) to be awarded the overall classification win.

=== 2009 ===
Flecha took the third step of the podium in the Omloop Het Nieuwsblad, formerly known as the Omloop Het Volk. He was part of a group of chasers who caught the two escapees Heinrich Haussler (Cervélo TestTeam) and Sebastian Langeveld (Rabobank) in the final meters, as the duet didn't want to cooperate. Haussler's teammate Thor Hushovd won the sprint as Flecha finished third while a crash occurred in the finale, implicating Langeveld and Filippo Pozzato (Team Katusha). In the third stage of Paris–Nice, he was outsprinted by Sylvain Chavanel and took second place, while he was part of a break of seven riders. Flecha participated in the cobbled classic Paris–Roubaix, and was in a good position to seek victory as he was in the leading group with five competitors, Tom Boonen, Leif Hoste, Thor Hushovd, Filippo Pozzato and Johan Van Summeren. About 15 kilometres (9.3 mi) away from the Roubaix velodrome, Flecha crashed in a left bend on the Carrefour de l'Arbre, a particularly tough cobbled section. He could not rejoin the leaders and finished sixth, while Boonen won the event. With again no victories in the 2009 season, Flecha declined a new offer from team Rabobank. He felt it was time for a new challenge.

=== 2010 ===
"Gilbert attacked, I got back to him and in the car they said "Go!" I didn't look back until at 100 meters [from the finish]. [...] It's really emotional for me. I've been knocking on the door many times and sometimes, like today, it just shows that you have to keep on trying and one day it will come. The victory came in a beautiful, beautiful way.

— Juan Antonio Flecha after winning the 2010 Omloop Het Nieuwsblad.

In 2010, he joined Team Sky. At the beginning of the season, he participated in his squad's victory at the Team time trial of the Tour of Qatar. He got his first major one-day race victory with his new team in the Omloop Het Nieuwsblad, becoming the first Spanish rider to win the event. He counter-attacked Philippe Gilbert on a cobbled section before making a 20 kilometres (12 mi) solo effort for the finish. He dedicated the win to his team and to his former teammate Frank Vandenbroucke who died in October 2009. In March he took the third step of the podium in the E3 Prijs Vlaanderen behind eternal classic rivals Tom Boonen and Fabian Cancellara. The three of them had broken clear with more than 25 kilometres (16 mi) to cover and cooperated to keep the chasers at bay, until Cancellara launched an attack with 2 kilometers remaining and won the race with a sizable gap. Flecha was out sprinted by Boonen for the second place. Two weeks later at Paris–Roubaix, he took another third place after breaking away from the chasers with Thor Hushovd in a vain attempt to reach Cancellara. The latter escaped shortly before the cobbled sector Mons-en-Pévèle and would be untouchable on that day, while Hushovd's sprinting speed proved too much for Flecha. Tom Boonen was upset that Flecha and the chasing group didn't bring back Cancellara in a concerted effort and made comments to that effect, but he didn't follow Flecha and Hushovd when they attacked.

Flecha went on to compete in the Tour de France in service of his leader Bradley Wiggins, who struggled in the mountains and finished 24th overall. However, Flecha earned the Combativity award in stage 13, where he animated the race thanks to a long escape with Pierrick Fedrigo of Bbox Bouygues Telecom and Quick-Step's Sylvain Chavanel. The trio was reeled in at the foot of the final climb.

=== 2011 ===
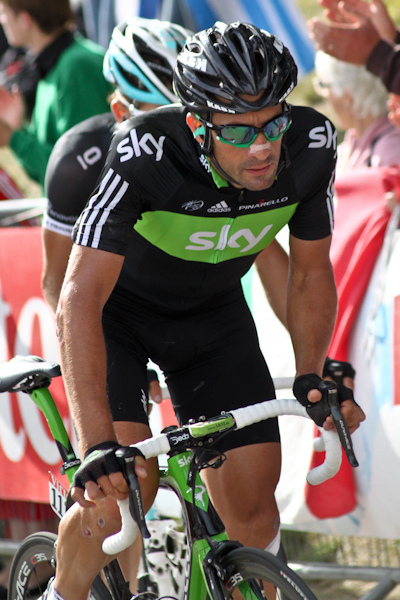
Flecha at the 2011 Tour de France

At the very short 2.5 kilometres (1.6 mi) prologue of the Tour of Qatar, Flecha survived a scare when a gust of wind knocked down some steel barriers as he was sprinting for the line. He managed to stay upright after skillfully negotiating the steel bars, with his back wheel slipping on the metallic surface. Despite the incident, he took the fourth place of the stage, and later on the fourth place of the whole Tour, 26 seconds down on Mark Renshaw (HTC–Highroad). In February, Flecha looked to repeat his win of 2010 at the Omloop Het Nieuwsblad. In wet conditions, he broke away from a group containing some race favorites on the Paaderstraat, with about 30 km (19 mi) to go, and caught the only man in front of him, Rabobank's Sebastian Langeveld. Flecha launched an attack with 5 km (3.1 mi) to cover, but Langeveld bridged the gap. The two were set to battle it out in the sprint, with Langeveld refusing to take pulls and Flecha going so far as to roll on the sidewalk to force his opponent to do some work in the front. Langeveld finally prevailed by a few inches on the line. At the Tour de France's ninth stage, Flecha was involved in a dramatic crash after he was sideswiped by a France Télévisions car, causing fellow breakaway rider, Johnny Hoogerland to crash into a barbed wire fence. He was treated on his bike for an injured elbow and finished the stage. He shared the Combativity award with Hoogerland for that stage. Flecha subsequently won a criminal case brought against the car's driver in the year after the crash and was awarded 10,000 Euros. On stage 16, Flecha attacked relentlessly trying to create a break during the first stages of the race, developing an average power of 297 watts over the whole race.

=== 2012 ===
At the beginning of the year, Flecha took the third place overall at the Tour of Qatar, thanks to a good placing on the fourth stage, as it was the only stage that didn't conclude in a mass sprint apart from the short team time trial. Back in Europe, he finished third in the Omloop Het Nieuwsblad, signing a podium finish for the fourth year in a row in this classic. He followed a strong attack by Garmin–Sharp's Sep Vanmarcke on the cobbled sector 'Lange Munte' with Tom Boonen. Flecha tried his luck in the final kilometers but was outsprinted by the pair, with Vanmarcke taking the win. He had to withdraw from the Tirreno–Adriatico because of a fracture to the metacarpal bone in his hand suffered in training. According to Danny Nelissen of Eurosport, it was the result of some sheninagans with a motorist.

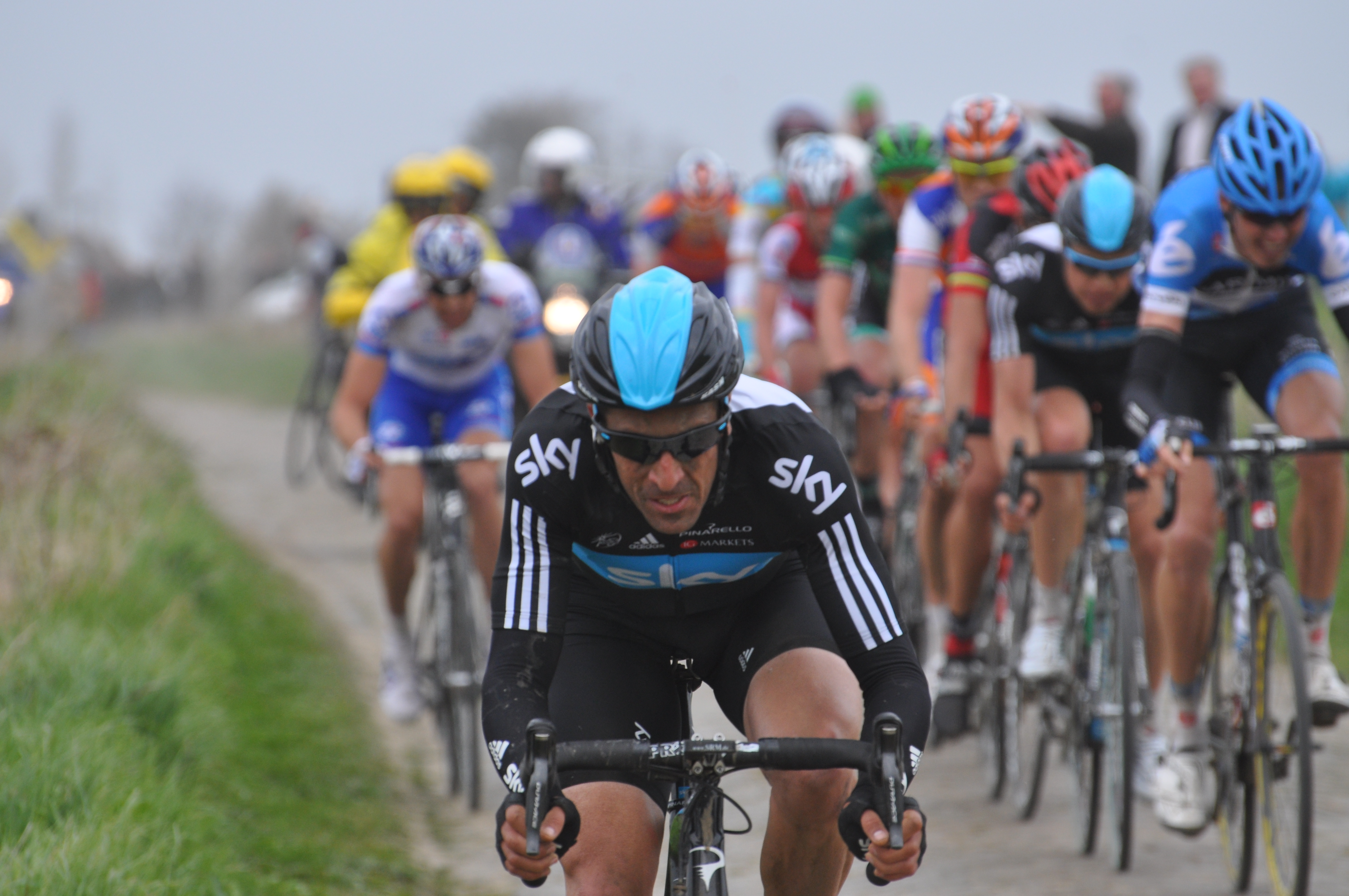
Flecha at the 2012 Paris–Roubaix

Flecha healed in time to be able to participate to Paris–Roubaix, looking for a victory as he finished in the top 10 of the Classic six times in the last 7 years, without ever winning it. He was part of a small group including his teammate Mathew Hayman who tried to bring back Tom Boonen from his solo breakaway initiated with 53 km (33 mi) to race, but they could not get to him. He entered the velodrome in Roubaix with two fellow escapees, but two other riders joined them as they were circling the track for the final kilometer of racing. A sprint ensued and Flecha took the fourth place of the Hell of the North race. Flecha got another notable result in June, coming in fourth place of the mostly flat Ster ZLM Toer, a 2.1 rated stage race. His teammate Mark Cavendish won the event.

In the Vuelta a España, Flecha rode in support of his leader, Chris Froome. In Stage 13, he broke away with six other men after the first hour of racing. The breakaway made it through and Flecha finished third, four seconds behind Steve Cummings of the BMC Racing Team squad. He won the Combativity award for his efforts.

Flecha left Team Sky at the end of the year and signed a one-year contract to ride with Vacansoleil–DCM in 2013. He stated that the change of teams will give him more freedom to attack and be himself rather than giving up personal ambitions as was the case with Team Sky.

=== 2013 ===
Flecha's first significant result of the 2013 campaign came in the Gent–Wevelgem race, where he attacked early with 80 kilometres (50 mi) to cover. He was joined and was part of the lead group when Peter Sagan soloed to victory, and he took the 5th place in the ensuing sprint containing 9 riders. He once again finished in the top 10 of Paris–Roubaix, taking the eight place as part of a small group that finished 39 seconds in arrears of the winner, Fabian Cancellara. In April, the Dutch newspaper Volkskrant published a story where Flecha is alleged to have undergone blood transfusions with doctor Eufemiano Fuentes. The news outlet alleges that the rider codenamed "Clasicomano" and "33" in the Operacion Puerto case is Flecha. Flecha denied the allegations and his team stood by him and promised to investigate further. The Vacansoleil team folded at the end of the season and Flecha decided to retire. His last race was the Tour of Beijing in October.

== Television career ==
Flecha is often featured as a co-host to Eurosport's Grand Tours extra programming, sometimes riding the key points of the course by bike, prior to the riders, with an integrated camera and stopping along the way to share his comments. He also interviews riders after the race.

== Career achievements ==
=== Major results ===
2001
1st Stage 4 Vuelta a Aragón
1st Stage 3 Euskal Bizikleta
2002
4th Klasika Primavera
2003
1st Stage 11 Tour de France
3rd Giro del Lazio
2004
1st Züri–Metzgete
1st Giro del Lazio
5th UCI World Cup
5th Overall Tour of Luxembourg
7th Gent–Wevelgem
7th Kuurne–Brussels–Kuurne
2005
1st Stage 4 Volta a la Comunitat Valenciana
2nd Gent–Wevelgem
3rd Paris–Roubaix
4th GP di Prato
9th HEW Cyclassics
2006
2nd GP Ouest–France
4th Paris–Roubaix
4th Brabantse Pijl
5th Overall Tour of Luxembourg
6th Overall Eneco Tour
2007
2nd Paris–Roubaix
2nd Omloop Het Volk
2008
1st Overall Circuit Franco-Belge
3rd Tour of Flanders
3rd Brabantse Pijl
2009
3rd Omloop Het Nieuwsblad
6th Paris–Roubaix
6th Overall Eneco Tour
2010
1st Omloop Het Nieuwsblad
3rd E3 Prijs Vlaanderen
3rd Paris–Roubaix
8th Strade Bianche
Combativity award Stage 13 Tour de France
2011
2nd Omloop Het Nieuwsblad
4th Overall Tour of Qatar
9th Paris–Roubaix
Combativity award Stage 9 Tour de France
2012
2nd Overall Tour de l'Eurometropole
3rd Overall Tour of Qatar
3rd Omloop Het Nieuwsblad
4th Paris–Roubaix
4th Overall Ster ZLM Toer
Combativity award Stage 13 Vuelta a España
2013
5th Gent–Wevelgem
6th Overall Danmark Rundt
8th Paris–Roubaix
Combativity award Stage 12 Tour de France
Combativity award Stage 16 Vuelta a España

=== Monuments results timeline ===
Monument	2002	2003	2004	2005	2006	2007	2008	2009	2010	2011	2012	2013
Milan–San Remo	34	64	—	—	40	39	41	29	18	76	—	72
Tour of Flanders	43	34	12	12	12	52	3	30	34	11	20	21
Paris–Roubaix	—	25	13	3	4	2	12	6	3	9	4	8
Liège–Bastogne–Liège	40	81	118	—	85	DNF	—	—	—	—	—	—
Giro di Lombardia	38	18	DNF	DNF	DNF	—	—	—	—	—	—	13

Legend
—	Did not compete
DNF	Did not finish
