= Johan Vansummeren =

Belgian road bicycle racer

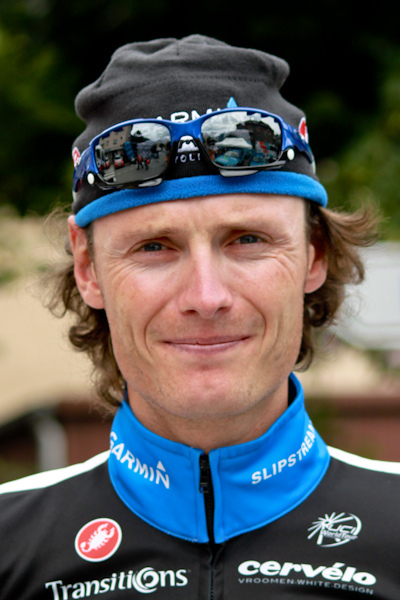
- Vansummeren at the 2011 Critérium du Dauphiné

Personal information
- Full name: Johan Vansummeren
- Nickname: Summie
- Born: 4 February 1981 (age 45) Lommel, Flanders, Belgium
- Height: 1.97 m (6 ft 5 1/2 in)
- Weight: 76 kg (168 lb; 12 st 0 lb)

Cycling career
- Sport: Cycling
- Current team: Retired
- Discipline: Road
- Role: Rider
- Rider type: All-rounder

Amateur teams
- 2002: → Domo–Farm Frites
- 2003: Quick-Step–Davitamon–Latexco

Professional teams
- 2004: Relax–Bodysol
- 2005–2009: Davitamon–Lotto
- 2010–2014: Garmin–Transitions
- 2015–2016: AG2R La Mondiale

Major wins
- Stage races Tour de Pologne (2007) One-day races and Classics Paris–Roubaix (2011)

Johan Vansummeren (born 4 February 1981) is a Belgian former professional road racing cyclist, who rode professionally between 2004 and 2016 for the Relax–Bodysol, Silence–Lotto, Garmin–Sharp and AG2R La Mondiale teams.

== Biography ==
Vansummeren was born, raised, and resides in Lommel, Flanders, Belgium. After two seasons in the amateur ranks, Vansummeren turned professional with Relax–Bodysol in 2004.

Although Vansummeren's role was primarily that of a domestique, he competed as a team leader during the classic season. In 2011, Vansummeren won the biggest race of his career, Paris–Roubaix. Vansummeren won the race after escaping from three other riders with 15 kilometres (9.3 miles) remaining, winning by nineteen seconds at the velodrome in Roubaix. He was victorious, despite riding the final 5 kilometres (3.1 miles) with a flat tire. Vansummeren also won the 2007 Tour de Pologne and rode the Tour de France nine times.

Vansummeren signed with AG2R La Mondiale for the 2015 and 2016 seasons. In June 2016, he announced his retirement from the sport after being diagnosed with a heart problem that had been detected in February at the Tour of Oman and resulted in him missing the classics season.

== Major results ==
1999
1st Overall Junior Tour of Wales
2001
4th Overall Le Triptyque des Monts et Châteaux
4th Circuit de Wallonie
5th Overall Ronde de l'Isard

1st Stage 5

8th Grand Prix de Waregem
2002
1st Circuit de Wallonie
1st Zellik–Galmaarden
3rd Overall Le Triptyque des Monts et Châteaux
5th Ronde van Vlaanderen Beloften
2003
1st Liège–Bastogne–Liège Espoirs
2nd Road race, UCI Under-23 Road World Championships
3rd Beverbeek Classic
4th Ronde van Vlaanderen Beloften
7th Overall Tour of Slovenia
9th Time trial, UEC European Under-23 Road Championships
10th Overall Tour de Normandie
10th Overall Le Triptyque des Monts et Châteaux
2004
8th Grand Prix Rudy Dhaenens
10th Grand Prix Eddy Merckx (with Bert Roesems)
2005
4th Overall Tour Down Under
2006
1st Points classification, Tour of Britain
5th Road race, National Road Championships
9th Grand Prix d'Isbergues
2007 (2 pro wins)
1st Overall Tour de Pologne

1st Stage 7

1st Stage 1 (TTT) Settimana Internazionale di Coppi e Bartali
2008
8th Paris–Roubaix
2009
5th Paris–Roubaix
10th Clásica de San Sebastián
2011 (1)
1st Paris–Roubaix
1st Duo Normand (with Thomas Dekker)
2012
1st Stage 2 (TTT) Tour of Qatar
9th Paris–Roubaix
10th Strade Bianche
2014
10th Kuurne–Brussels–Kuurne

=== Grand Tour general classification results timeline ===
Grand Tour	2004	2005	2006	2007	2008	2009	2010	2011	2012	2013	2014	2015
Giro d'Italia	Did not contest during career											
Tour de France	—	136	109	62	86	90	29	—	147	—	74	DNF
Vuelta a España	35	—	—	—	—	—	—	70	79	88	118	121

=== Monuments results timeline ===
Monument	2004	2005	2006	2007	2008	2009	2010	2011	2012	2013	2014	2015
Milan–San Remo	—	85	101	87	133	60	98	123	81	74	98	156
Tour of Flanders	120	DNF	—	51	DNF	DNF	54	—	49	20	DNF	105
Paris–Roubaix	—	—	—	92	8	5	DNF	1	9	50	38	75
Liège–Bastogne–Liège	—	29	61	56	—	—	—	—	—	—	—	—
Giro di Lombardia	Did not contest during his career											

Legend
—	Did not compete
DNF	Did not finish

Sporting positions
Preceded by Stefan Schumacher	Tour de Pologne; 2007	Succeeded by Jens Voigt
