= 2006 Paris–Roubaix =

2006 UCI ProTour, race 7 of 27
- Official event poster

Race details
- Dates: April 9, 2006
- Stages: 1
- Distance: 259 km (161 mi)
- Winning time: 6h 07' 54"

Results
	Winner	Fabian Cancellara (SUI)	(Team CSC)
	Second	Tom Boonen (BEL)	(Quick-Step–Innergetic)
	Third	Alessandro Ballan (ITA)	(Lampre–Fondital)

The 2006 Paris–Roubaix was the 104th running of the Paris–Roubaix single-day cycling race, often known as the Hell of the North. It was held on 9 April 2006 over a distance of 259 kilometres (160.9 miles). Fabian Cancellara became the second road racing cyclist from Switzerland to win the race. This edition was run under clear skies and relatively good weather, meaning that the difficulty of this edition was the dust. The main favourite for the race was Tom Boonen, winner of the 2005 Paris–Roubaix and the 2006 Tour of Flanders.

== Route ==
Starting in Compiègne, the race finished on the velodrome in Roubaix after covering 259 kilometres (161 mi), with 52.7 kilometres (32.7 mi) of cobblestones spread out over 27 sectors. The Trouée d'Arenberg sector returned to the race following its omission from the 2005 edition, after regional and local councils spent €250,000 to restore the road and add 50 cm to its width.

== First selection ==
As usual, the selection of favourites was done at the Forest of Arenberg after Cancellara and Tom Boonen increased the pace. The selection included 17 riders, consisting of:

- for Davitamon–Lotto: Peter Van Petegem and Gert Steegmans
- for Discovery Channel: Vladimir Gusev, George Hincapie and Leif Hoste
- for Quick-Step–Innergetic: Tom Boonen
- for T-Mobile Team: Steffen Wesemann and Stephan Schreck
- for Française des Jeux: Frédéric Guesdon and Bernhard Eisel
- for Rabobank: Juan Antonio Flecha and Joost Posthuma
- for Caisse d'Epargne–Illes Balears: Nicolas Portal
- for Lampre–Fondital: Alessandro Ballan and Enrico Franzoi
- for Team CSC: Fabian Cancellara and Lars Michaelsen

== Key moments ==
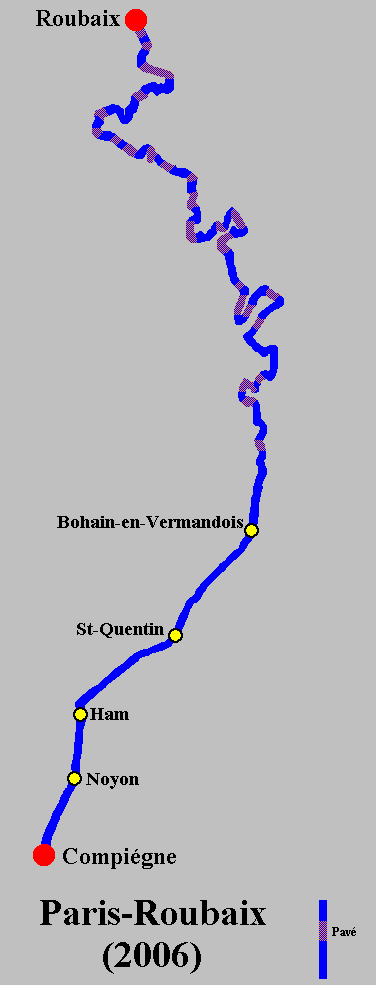
Route for the 2006 Paris-Roubaix

Most of the riders began to quicken the pace after they realized that Tom Boonen, previous year winner and main favourite, had no teammates in the leading group. A persecution began between the leading group and a peloton led by five Quick-Step–Innergetic riders, including Filippo Pozzato and Servais Knaven, trying to assist Tom Boonen. With 80 kilometers to go and after almost 20 kilometers of struggling, Quick-Step–Innergetic gave up. In the leading group Joost Posthuma, Enrico Franzoi, Nicolas Portal and Stephan Schreck lost contact with the leading group although Portal would eventually rejoin the lead.

With 45 kilometres to go, while going through Mons-en-Pévèle cobblestone section, George Hincapie's steerer tube broke and he injured his collarbone, forcing him to retire from the race. Soon after Tom Boonen and Juan Antonio Flecha made a series of accelerations that selected the lead group to only eight riders: Alessandro Ballan, Tom Boonen, Fabian Cancellara, Bernhard Eisel, Juan Antonio Flecha, Vladimir Gusev, Leif Hoste and Peter Van Petegem. Vladimir Gusev fell a short time later in a fall that also brought down the Italian Alessandro Ballan with 25 kilometres to go, although they could make it back to the lead.

With 20 kilometres to go and riding through Camphin-en Pévèle cobblestones sector, Fabian Cancellara attacked and gained a few metres along with Vladimir Gusev over the rest of the leaders. The difference soon increased to 20 seconds when, hitting Carrefour de l'Arbre, Cancellara began a solo effort to Roubaix after Gusev couldn't hold on the pace by the Swiss time-trial specialist. In this same sector Leif Hoste attacked while Gusev was losing contact with Cancellara. Peter Van Petegem followed him, while Tom Boonen, Juan Antonio Flecha and Alessandro Ballan were close behind them. Hoste and Van Petegem would eventually catch Gusev trying to catch Cancellara, who wouldn't stop increasing his advantage, eventually winning over a minute in Roubaix Velodrome.

=== Disqualifications ===
Hoste, Van Petegem and Vladimir Gusev were initially credited with 2nd through 4th places (1'23" down), but were later disqualified by the race jury for illegally riding through a closed level-crossing. (This railway crossing should not have been closed and the organizers received criticism because of it.) This promoted world champion and pre-race favourite Boonen into 2nd place.

== Results ==
09-04-2006: Compiègne–Roubaix, 259 km.:

Results (1–10)
	Cyclist	Team	Time
1	Fabian Cancellara (SUI)	Team CSC	6h 07' 54"
DSQ	Leif Hoste (BEL)	Discovery Channel	+ 1' 23"
DSQ	Peter Van Petegem (BEL)	Davitamon–Lotto	+ 1' 23"
DSQ	Vladimir Gusev (RUS)	Discovery Channel	+ 1' 23"
2	Tom Boonen (BEL)	Quick-Step–Innergetic	+ 1' 49"
3	Alessandro Ballan (ITA)	Lampre–Fondital	+ 1' 49"
4	Juan Antonio Flecha (ESP)	Rabobank	+ 1' 49"
5	Bernhard Eisel (AUT)	Française des Jeux	+ 3' 25"
6	Steffen Wesemann (SUI)	T-Mobile Team	+ 5' 35"
7	Frédéric Guesdon (FRA)	Française des Jeux	+ 6' 31"
8	Bert Roesems (BEL)	Davitamon–Lotto	+ 6' 44"
9	Christophe Mengin (FRA)	Française des Jeux	+ 6' 44"
10	Staf Scheirlinckx (BEL)	Cofidis	+ 6' 45"
