= Roberto Petito =

Italian road cyclist

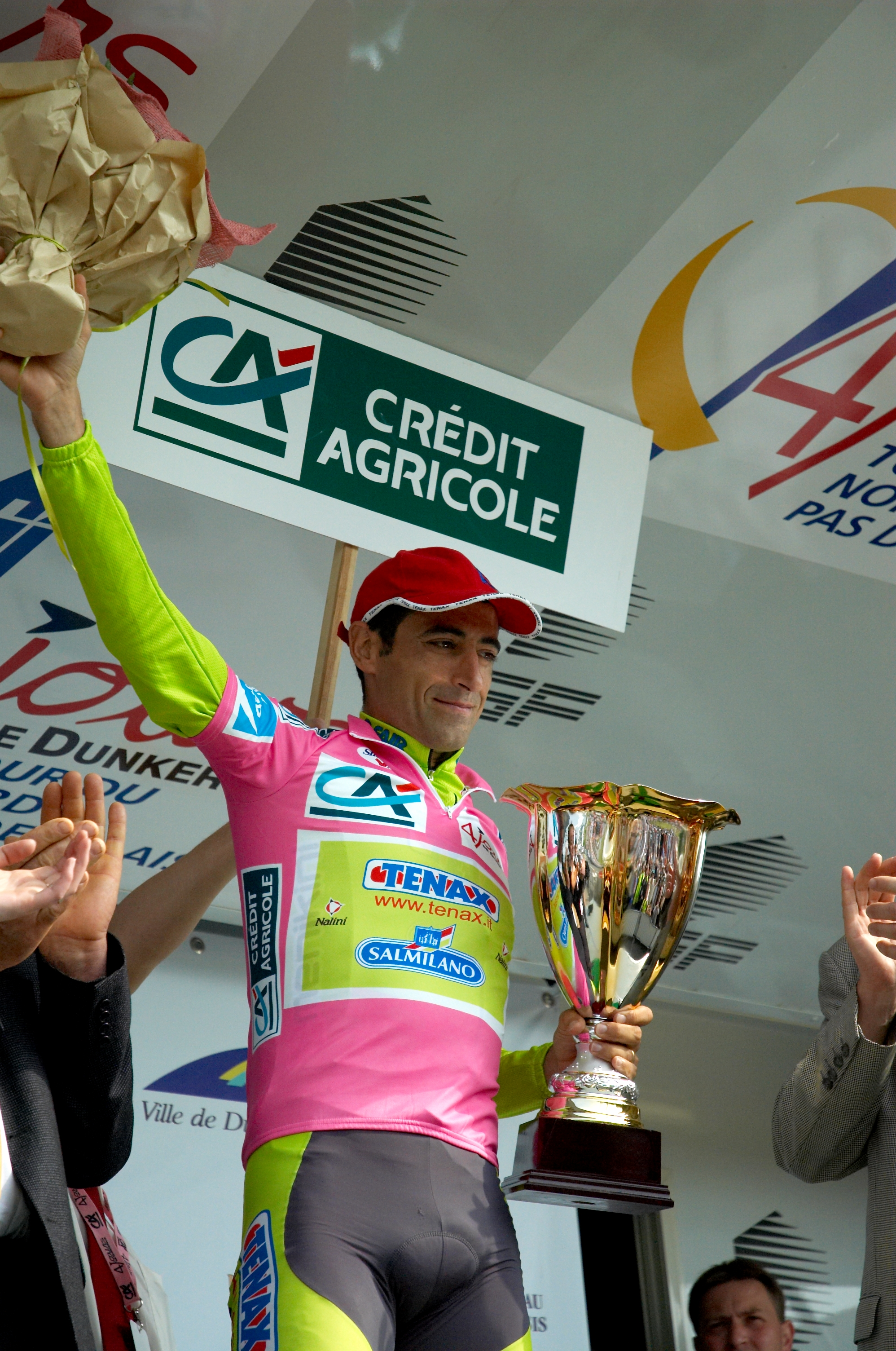
- Petito at the 2006 Four Days of Dunkirk

Personal information
- Full name: Roberto Petito
- Born: 1 February 1971 (age 55) Civitavecchia, Italy

Cycling career
- Sport: Cycling
- Discipline: Road
- Role: Rider

Professional teams
- 1994–1995: Mercatone Uno–Medeghini
- 1996–1999: Saeco–AS Juvenes San Marino
- 2000–2005: Fassa Bortolo
- 2006: Tenax–Salmilano
- 2007–2008: Liquigas

Major wins
- Four Days of Dunkirk (2006); Tirreno–Adriatico (1997)

Roberto Petito (born 1 February 1971) is an Italian former professional road bicycle racer.

Petito was born in Civitavecchia. His most important win came in 1997, when he won the Tirreno–Adriatico. He has also finished in the top five in classics such as the Tour of Flanders or Paris–Roubaix, as well as the overall in the 2006 edition of the Four Days of Dunkirk.

== Career achievements ==
=== Major results ===
1992
1st Overall Giro delle Regioni

1st Stage 3

1994
1st Giro della Romagna
2nd Gran Piemonte
1995
2nd Overall Tour Méditerranéen
6th Overall Paris–Nice
1997
1st Overall Tirreno–Adriatico
1st Overall Giro di Sardegna
1st Overall Settimana Internazionale Coppi e Bartali
7th Wincanton Classic
7th Overall Tour of Galicia
9th Overall Vuelta Ciclista a la Comunidad Valenciana
1998
5th Trofeo Laigueglia
8th La Flèche Wallonne
9th Milan–San Remo
1999
2nd Road race, National Road Championships
7th Trofeo Melinda
2000
2nd Trofeo Laigueglia
9th Overall Tour Méditerranéen
2001
1st Trofeo Pantalica
6th Overall Tirreno–Adriatico

1st Stage 5

1st Stage 1 Giro d'Abruzzo
4th Trofeo Laigueglia
4th G.P. Costa degli Etruschi
8th Overall Giro della Liguria
2003
9th Trofeo Matteotti
10th Overall Tour Méditerranéen
2004
1st Stage 5 Tirreno–Adriatico
5th Tre Valli Varesine
7th Firenze–Pistoia
2005
4th GP Lugano
5th Tour of Flanders
5th Overall Driedaagse van De Panne–Koksijde
8th Milano–Torino
2006
1st Overall Four Days of Dunkirk

1st Stage 2

6th Giro di Toscana
10th Tour of Flanders
2007
5th Paris–Roubaix

=== Grand Tour general classification results timeline ===
Grand Tour	1994	1995	1996	1997	1998	1999	2000	2001
Giro d'Italia	—	—	63	24	—	60	—	100
Tour de France	DNF	DNF	—	—	—	—	—	—
Vuelta a España	73	—	—	DNF	—	—	—	—

Legend
DSQ	Disqualified
DNF	Did not finish
