= Wolfgang Wesemann =

German cyclist (1949–2025)

Personal information
- Born: 30 October 1949 Elbeu, Saxony-Anhalt, East Germany
- Died: 16 January 2025 (aged 75)

Cycling career
- Sport: Cycling

Wolfgang Wesemann (30 October 1949 – 16 January 2025) was a German cyclist. He competed in the individual road race for East Germany at the 1972 Summer Olympics. He won the DDR Rundfahrt in 1971. Wesemann died on 16 January 2025, at the age of 75. The road racing cyclist Steffen Wesemann is his son.
