= Tom Veelers =

Road bicycle racer

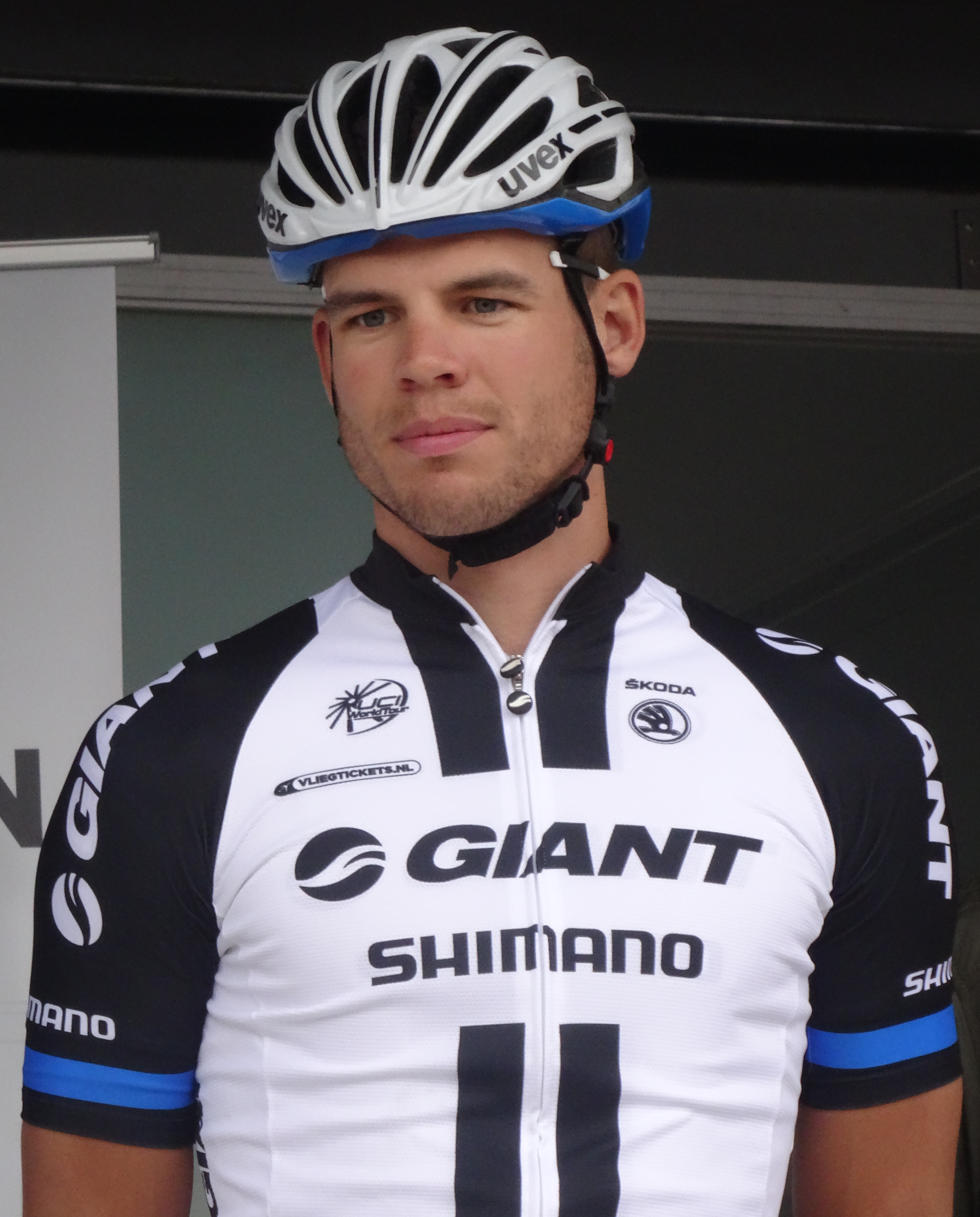
- Veelers at the 2014 Omloop van het Houtland.

Personal information
- Full name: Tom Veelers
- Born: 14 September 1984 (age 42) Ootmarsum, the Netherlands
- Height: 1.84 m (6 ft 0 in)
- Weight: 75 kg (165 lb)

Cycling career
- Sport: Cycling
- Discipline: Road
- Role: Rider
- Rider type: Sprinter; Lead-out man

Professional teams
- 2003–2004: Cycling Team Löwik–Tegeltoko
- 2005–2007: Rabobank Continental Team
- 2008–2016: Skil–Shimano

Tom Veelers (born 14 September 1984) is a retired Dutch professional road bicycle racer, who rode professionally between 2003 and 2016 for Löwik–Tegeltoko, the Rabobank Continental Team and Team Giant–Alpecin. Born in Ootmarsum, Overijssel, Veelers won the 2006 edition of U23 Paris–Roubaix.

In December 2016 he announced his retirement after suffering from knee injuries for over two years.

== Major results ==
2002
1st Road race, National Junior Road Championships
4th Road race, UCI Junior Road World Championships
2003
10th Kattekoers
2004
1st Noord-Nederland Tour (with 21 other riders)
2nd Road race, UEC European Under-23 Road Championships
3rd Road race, National Under-23 Road Championships
3rd ZLM Tour
4th Grand Prix de Waregem
2005
3rd Ronde van Drenthe
4th Internationale Wielertrofee Jong Maar Moedig
5th Overall Le Triptyque des Monts et Châteaux
5th Grand Prix Pino Cerami
6th Overall Tour du Loir-et-Cher

1st Stage 5

7th Grand Prix de Waregem
9th Paris–Roubaix Espoirs
2006
1st Overall Olympia's Tour

1st Stages 5, 6 & 8

1st Paris–Roubaix Espoirs
2nd Beverbeek Classic
8th Grande Prémio Internacional Costa Azul
10th Road race, UEC European Under-23 Road Championships
2007
1st Overall OZ Wielerweekend
3rd Overall Olympia's Tour
4th Overall Boucles de la Mayenne

1st Prologue

5th Ronde van Noord-Holland
8th Omloop der Kempen
8th Grand Prix de la Somme
2008
1st Stage 7 Tour of Qinghai Lake
3rd Ronde van Overijssel
3rd Nationale Sluitingsprijs
8th Ronde van het Groene Hart
2009
1st Stage 9 Tour of Qinghai Lake
5th Paris–Brussels
6th Profronde van Fryslan
10th Overall Tour of Qatar
2010
3rd Kampioenschap van Vlaanderen
7th Paris–Brussels
8th Dwars door Vlaanderen
9th Omloop Het Nieuwsblad
9th Ronde van Overijssel
10th Binche–Tournai–Binche
2011
1st Stage 3 Tour of Hainan
2nd Overall Tour de Wallonie-Picarde

1st Stage 3

7th Overall Delta Tour Zeeland
2012
3rd Halle–Ingooigem
4th Overall World Ports Classic
4th Velothon Berlin
4th Dutch Food Valley Classic
5th Overall Tour of Qatar
6th Kuurne–Brussels–Kuurne
9th Vattenfall Cyclassics
2013
2nd Münsterland Giro
4th Handzame Classic
6th Dutch Food Valley Classic
6th Grand Prix de Fourmies
8th GP Impanis-Van Petegem
