= Nico Mattan =

Belgian cyclist (born 1971)

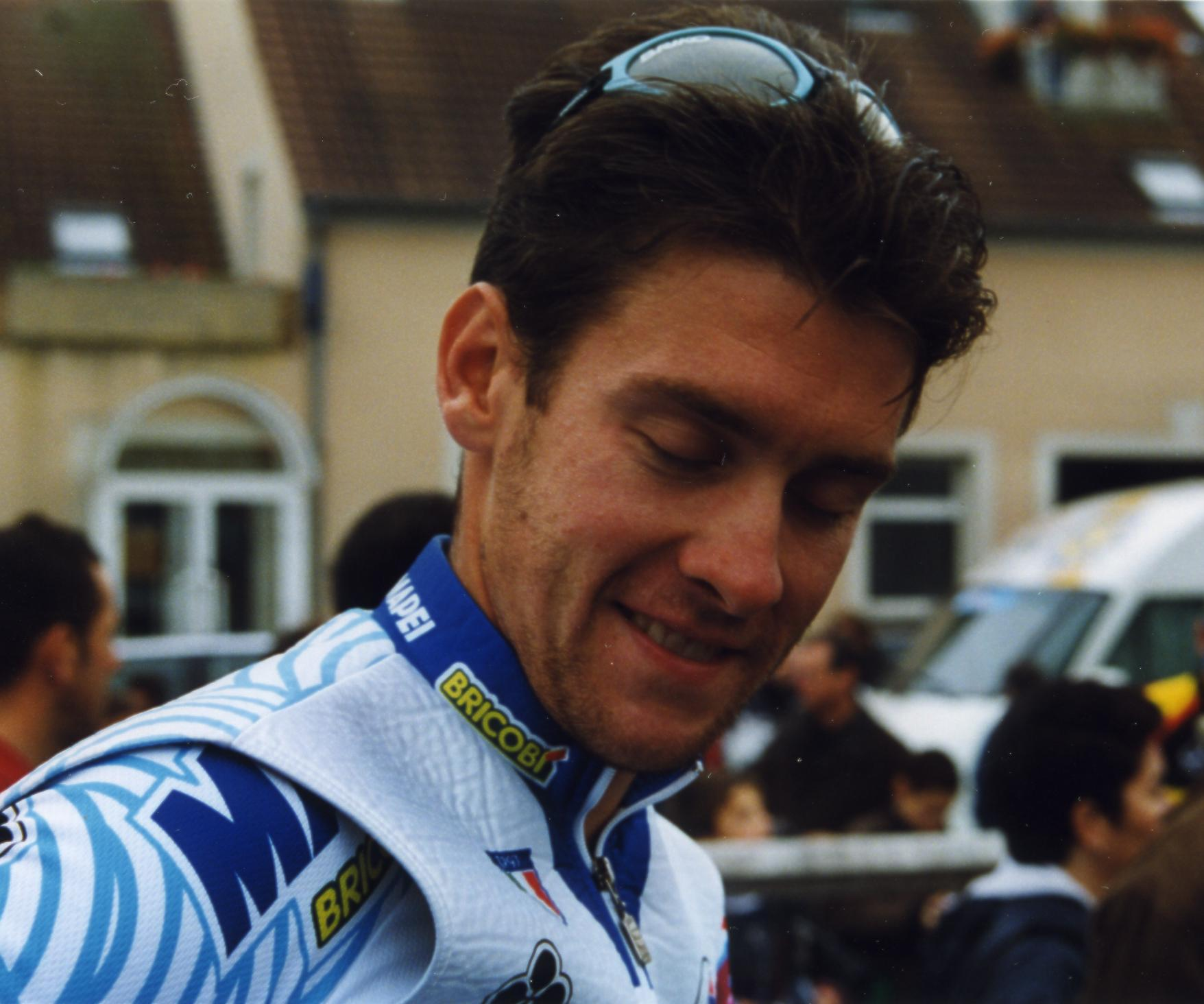
- Mattan at the 1998 Paris–Tours

Personal information
- Full name: Nico Mattan
- Born: 17 July 1971 (age 55) Izegem, Belgium

Cycling career
- Sport: Cycling
- Current team: Retired
- Discipline: Road
- Role: Classics specialist

Professional teams
- 1994–1996: Lotto
- 1997–1998: Mapei–GB
- 1999–2003: Cofidis
- 2004: Relax–Bodysol
- 2005–2006: Davitamon–Lotto
- 2007: DFL–Cyclingnews–Litespeed

Nico Mattan (born 17 July 1971) is a Belgian former road racing cyclist. His greatest achievement in cycling was winning the Gent–Wevelgem classic in 2005.

In 2005 Mattan won the Gent–Wevelgem in a controversial way, as there were claims that he used Publicity cars to sprint past Juan Antonio Flecha. He also won 2 prologues of Paris–Nice, in 2001 and 2003.

== Major results ==
1996
1st Stage 1 Tour de Wallonie
2001
1st Overall Three Days of De Panne

1st Stage 3b (ITT)

1st Prologue Paris–Nice
1st GP Ouest–France
1st Giro del Piemonte
2003
1st Prologue Paris–Nice
2004
1st Noord Nederland Tour
2005
1st Gent–Wevelgem
