= Steffen Wesemann =

Swiss-German racing cyclist

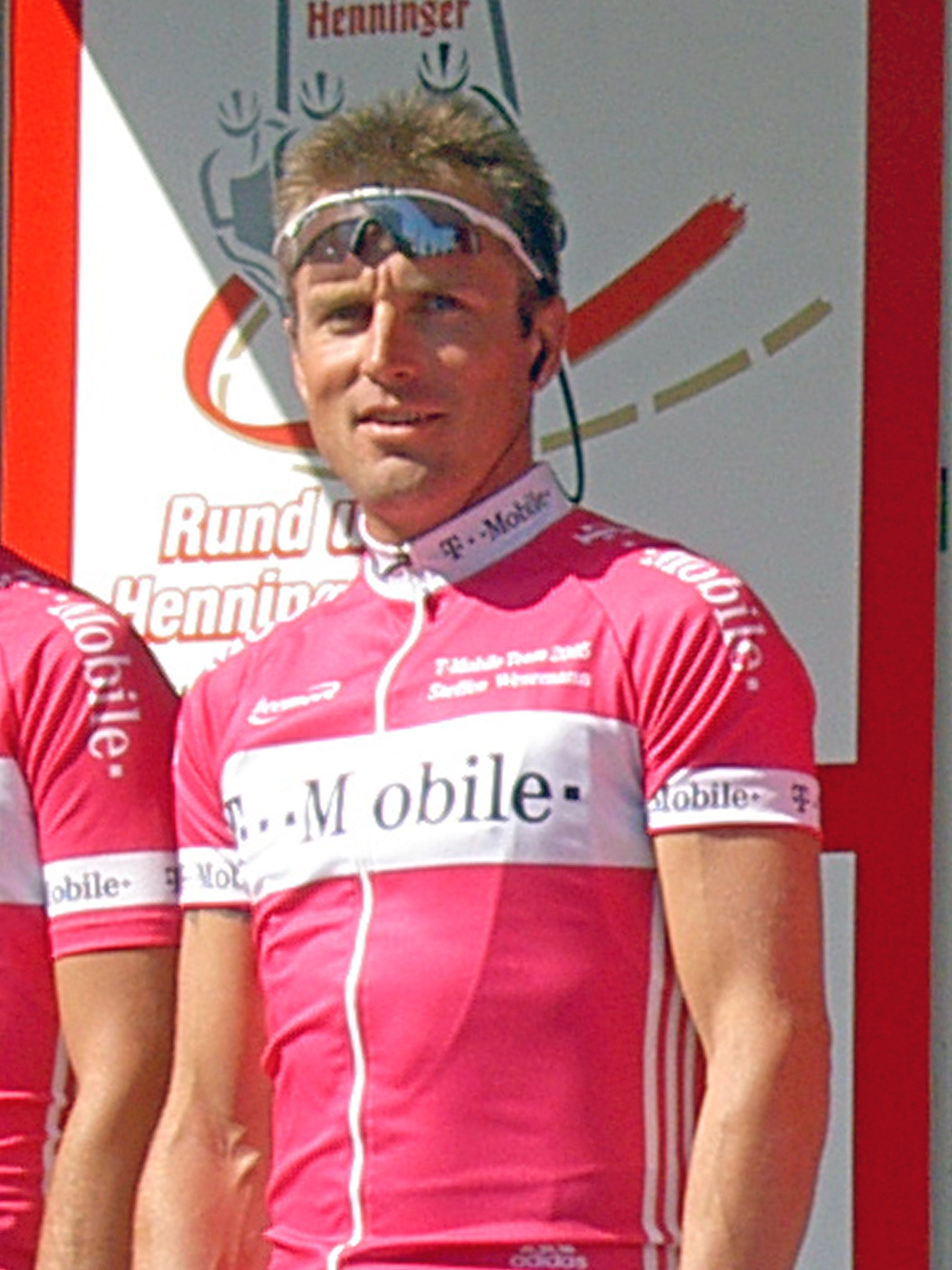
- Wesemann at the 2005 Rund um den Henninger Turm

Personal information
- Born: 11 March 1971 (age 55) Wolmirstedt, East Germany
- Height: 1.73 m (5 ft 8 in)
- Weight: 72 kg (159 lb)

Cycling career
- Sport: Cycling
- Current team: Retired
- Discipline: Road
- Role: Rider
- Rider type: Classics specialist

Professional teams
- 1992–2006: Team Telekom
- 2007: Wiesenhof–Felt
- 2008: Cycle Collstrop

Major wins
- Stage races Peace Race (1992, 1996, 1997, 1999, 2003) One-day races and Classics Tour of Flanders (2004)

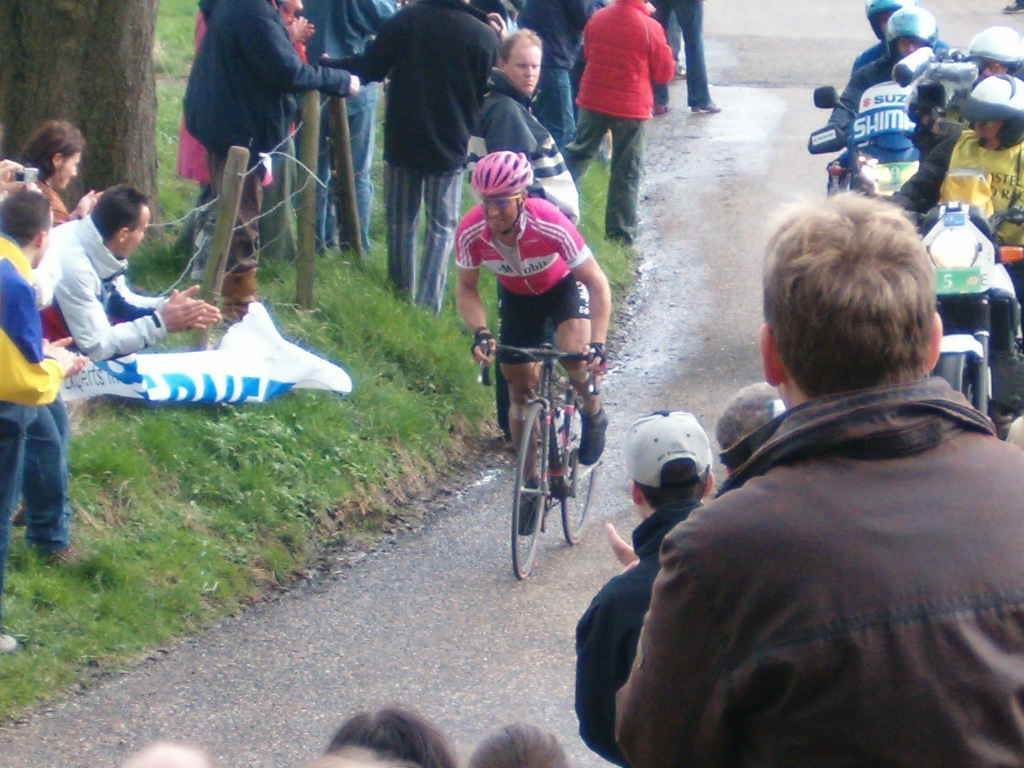
Wesemann on the Eyserbosweg during the Amstel Gold Race 2006

Steffen Wesemann (born 11 March 1971) is a Swiss-German former professional road racing cyclist, son of the cyclist Wolfgang Wesemann.

He competed in the individual road race at the 1992 Summer Olympics. Wesemann most recently rode for the professional continental team Cycle Collstrop after riding a year with the Team Wiesenhof–Felt squad. He had previously spent the other years of his career at Telekom who later became Team T-Mobile. He rode and completed the Vuelta a España on three occasions in 1995, 1996 and 2003 and finished the Tour de France twice in 1999 and 2002.

In September 2005, Wesemann and his family, longtime residents of Küttigen, Switzerland, obtained Swiss citizenship. He was a specialist in the one-day Spring Classics—winner of the 2004 Tour of Flanders and 5-time champion of the Peace Race.

== Major results ==
1989
3rd Junior Road race, UCI Road World Championships
1990
2nd Overall Paris–Bourges
1991
1st Overall Tour de Berlin
1992
1st Overall Niedersachsen-Rundfahrt

1st Prologue & Stage 9b

1st Overall Peace Race

1st Stages 1 & 4

1st GP Buchholz
3rd Overall Rheinland-Pfalz Rundfahrt
1993
1st Stage 5 Setmana Catalana de Ciclisme
1st Sprints classification, Vuelta a Andalucía
1st Stage 11 Tour de l'Avenir
1994
1st Stage Coca-Cola-Trophy
1995
2nd E3 Prijs Vlaanderen
3rd Grand Prix Gippingen
1996
1st Overall Peace Race

1st Sprints classification
1st Stages 1, 2, 4a (ITT), 5, 8, 9 & 10

1st Stage 4 Rheinland-Pfalz Rundfahrt
4th Veenendaal–Veenendaal
1997
1st Overall Peace Race

1st Prologue & Stages 2, 3 & 7

1998
1st Rund um den Flughafen Köln-Bonn
1st Stage 4a Vuelta a Castilla y León
2nd Overall Peace Race
2nd Overall Sachsen Tour

1st Prologue

1999
1st Overall Peace Race

1st Stages 2, 7 (ITT) & 10

7th Tour de Berne
9th Gent–Wevelgem
2000
1st Rund um Köln
1st Grand Prix Gippingen
1st Stage 1 (TTT) Tour de Suisse
2nd Omloop Het Volk
2nd Road race, German National Road Championships
3rd Overall Tour Down Under

1st Stage 4

3rd Overall Peace Race

1st Stages 1 & 4 (ITT)

3rd GP Buchholz
9th Paris–Roubaix
9th Gent–Wevelgem
2001
2nd E3 Prijs Vlaanderen
3rd Gent–Wevelgem
7th Paris–Roubaix
2002
2nd Paris–Roubaix
8th E3 Prijs Vlaanderen
10th Overall Tour Down Under
2003
1st Overall Peace Race

1st Stage 3

1st Rund um den Flughafen Koln/Bonn
1st Stage 5 Sachsen Tour
2nd Amstel Gold Race
2nd E3 Prijs Vlaanderen
5th GP du canton d'Argovie
9th Overall Tour Down Under
2004
1st Tour of Flanders
2005
6th Züri-Metzgete
6th E3 Prijs Vlaanderen
2006
2nd Amstel Gold Race
6th Paris–Roubaix
10th Overall Eneco Tour
2007
3rd Paris–Roubaix
3rd GP Bucholtz
2008
7th Rund um den Henninger-Turm
