= 2010 Omloop Het Nieuwsblad =

Race details
- Dates: 27 February
- Stages: 1
- Distance: 204.4 km (127.0 mi)
- Winning time: 5h 07' 15"

Results
| | Winner | Juan Antonio Flecha (ESP) | (Team Sky) |
| | Second | Heinrich Haussler (GER) | (Cervélo TestTeam) |
| | Third | Tyler Farrar (USA) | (Garmin–Transitions) |

The 2010 Omloop Het Nieuwsblad cycle race took place on 27 February 2010. It was the 65th edition of the international classic Omloop Het Nieuwsblad. The race was won by Juan Antonio Flecha after a 19-kilometre (12 mi) solo ride.

== Results ==
Result
| Rank | Rider | Team | Time |
|---|---|---|---|
| 1 | Juan Antonio Flecha (ESP) | Team Sky | 5h 07' 15" |
| 2 | Heinrich Haussler (GER) | Cervélo TestTeam | + 18" |
| 3 | Tyler Farrar (USA) | Garmin–Transitions | + 18" |
| 4 | Luca Paolini (ITA) | Acqua & Sapone | + 18" |
| 5 | Marcel Sieberg (GER) | Team HTC–Columbia | + 18" |
| 6 | Edvald Boasson Hagen (NOR) | Team Sky | + 18" |
| 7 | Niko Eeckhout (BEL) | An Post–Sean Kelly | + 18" |
| 8 | Bernhard Eisel (AUT) | Team HTC–Columbia | + 18" |
| 9 | Tom Veelers (NED) | Skil–Shimano | + 18" |
| 10 | Filippo Pozzato (ITA) | Team Katusha | + 18" |
