= 2012 Tour of Qatar =

- Route of the 2012 Tour of Qatar

Race details
- Dates: 5–10 February 2012
- Stages: 6
- Distance: 727.3 km (451.9 mi)
- Winning time: 15h 42' 14"

Results
Jersey awarded to the overall winner	Winner	Tom Boonen (Belgium)	(Omega Pharma–Quick-Step)
	Second	Tyler Farrar (United States)	(Garmin–Barracuda)
	Third	Juan Antonio Flecha (Spain)	(Team Sky)
	Points	Tom Boonen (Belgium)	(Omega Pharma–Quick-Step)
Jersey awarded to the young rider classification winner	Young rider	Ramūnas Navardauskas (Lithuania)	(Garmin–Barracuda)
	Team	Omega Pharma–Quick-Step	

The 2012 Tour of Qatar was the eleventh edition of the Tour of Qatar cycling stage race. It was rated as a 2.HC event on the UCI Asia Tour, and was held between 5 and 10 February 2012, in Qatar.

The race was won for the fourth time by Belgium's Tom Boonen, of the Omega Pharma–Quick-Step team, leading the race from start to finish and taking two stage victories along the way. Boonen's winning margin over runner-up Tyler Farrar (Garmin–Barracuda) – the winners of the team time trial stage near the Losail International Circuit – was 28 seconds, and Team Sky's Juan Antonio Flecha completed the podium, five seconds behind Farrar and 33 seconds down on Boonen. In the race's other classifications, Boonen also won the points classification, having held the lead of the standings from start to finish, Farrar's teammate Ramūnas Navardauskas won the white jersey for the youth classification, by placing eighth overall in the general classification, and Omega Pharma–Quick-Step finished at the head of the teams classification.

== Teams ==
Sixteen teams competed in the 2012 Tour of Qatar. These included eleven UCI ProTour teams, three UCI Professional Continental teams, and two Continental teams.

The teams that participated in the race were:

- BMC Racing Team
- Bridgestone–Anchor
- Champion System
- Farnese Vini–Selle Italia
- FDJ–BigMat
- Garmin–Barracuda
- GreenEDGE
- Team Katusha
- Liquigas–Cannondale
- Lotto–Belisol
- Omega Pharma–Quick-Step
- Project 1t4i
- Rabobank
- RadioShack–Nissan
- RTS Racing Team
- Team Sky

== Stages ==
=== Stage 1 ===
5 February 2012 – Barzan Towers to College of the North Atlantic, 141.5 km (87.9 mi)

Stage 1 Result

	Rider	Team	Time
1	Tom Boonen (BEL)	Omega Pharma–Quick-Step	3h 11' 32"
2	Adam Blythe (GBR)	BMC Racing Team	+ 0"
3	Peter Sagan (SVK)	Liquigas–Cannondale	+ 0"
4	Tyler Farrar (USA)	Garmin–Barracuda	+ 0"
5	Daniel Oss (ITA)	Liquigas–Cannondale	+ 0"
6	Mark Renshaw (AUS)	Rabobank	+ 0"
7	Alexander Kristoff (NOR)	Team Katusha	+ 0"
8	Davide Appollonio (ITA)	Team Sky	+ 0"
9	Jonas Vangenechten (BEL)	Lotto–Belisol	+ 0"
10	Robert Wagner (GER)	RadioShack–Nissan	+ 0"

General Classification after Stage 1

	Rider	Team	Time
1	Tom Boonen (BEL)	Omega Pharma–Quick-Step	3h 11' 22"
2	Adam Blythe (GBR)	BMC Racing Team	+ 4"
3	Peter Sagan (SVK)	Liquigas–Cannondale	+ 6"
4	Tyler Farrar (USA)	Garmin–Barracuda	+ 7"
5	Adam Hansen (AUS)	Lotto–Belisol	+ 7"
6	Davide Appollonio (ITA)	Team Sky	+ 8"
7	Marco Haller (AUT)	Team Katusha	+ 8"
8	Mark Renshaw (AUS)	Rabobank	+ 9"
9	Nikolas Maes (BEL)	Omega Pharma–Quick-Step	+ 9"
10	Daniel Oss (ITA)	Liquigas–Cannondale	+ 10"

=== Stage 2 ===
6 February 2012 – Losail, 11.3 km (7.0 mi) team time trial (TTT)

Stage 2 Result

	Team	Time
1	Garmin–Barracuda	12' 38"
2	Omega Pharma–Quick-Step	+ 7"
3	Team Sky	+ 9"
4	Team Katusha	+ 9"
5	Liquigas–Cannondale	+ 13"
6	RadioShack–Nissan	+ 14"
7	GreenEDGE	+ 16"
8	BMC Racing Team	+ 16"
9	Rabobank	+ 17"
10	Lotto–Belisol	+ 17"

General Classification after Stage 2

	Rider	Team	Time
1	Tom Boonen (BEL)	Omega Pharma–Quick-Step	3h 24' 07"
2	Tyler Farrar (USA)	Garmin–Barracuda	+ 0"
3	Johan Vansummeren (BEL)	Garmin–Barracuda	+ 3"
4	Ramūnas Navardauskas (LTU)	Garmin–Barracuda	+ 3"
5	Thomas Dekker (NED)	Garmin–Barracuda	+ 3"
6	Robert Hunter (RSA)	Garmin–Barracuda	+ 3"
7	Davide Appollonio (ITA)	Team Sky	+ 10"
8	Francesco Chicchi (ITA)	Omega Pharma–Quick-Step	+ 10"
9	Gert Steegmans (BEL)	Omega Pharma–Quick-Step	+ 10"
10	Guillaume Van Keirsbulck (BEL)	Omega Pharma–Quick-Step	+ 10"

=== Stage 3 ===
7 February 2012 – Dukhan to Al-Gharafa Stadium, 146.5 km (91.0 mi)

Stage 3 Result

	Rider	Team	Time
1	Mark Cavendish (GBR)	Team Sky	3h 23' 48"
2	Tom Boonen (BEL)	Omega Pharma–Quick-Step	+ 0"
3	Aidis Kruopis (LTU)	GreenEDGE	+ 0"
4	Mark Renshaw (AUS)	Rabobank	+ 0"
5	John Degenkolb (GER)	Project 1t4i	+ 0"
6	Tyler Farrar (USA)	Garmin–Barracuda	+ 0"
7	Rüdiger Selig (GER)	Team Katusha	+ 0"
8	David Boucher (FRA)	FDJ–BigMat	+ 0"
9	Robert Wagner (GER)	RadioShack–Nissan	+ 0"
10	Aleksandr Kuschynski (BLR)	Team Katusha	+ 0"

General Classification after Stage 3

	Rider	Team	Time
1	Tom Boonen (BEL)	Omega Pharma–Quick-Step	6h 47' 49"
2	Tyler Farrar (USA)	Garmin–Barracuda	+ 6"
3	Mark Cavendish (GBR)	Team Sky	+ 8"
4	Johan Vansummeren (BEL)	Garmin–Barracuda	+ 12"
5	Thomas Dekker (NED)	Garmin–Barracuda	+ 12"
6	Robert Hunter (RSA)	Garmin–Barracuda	+ 12"
7	Mikhail Ignatiev (RUS)	Team Katusha	+ 17"
8	Bernhard Eisel (AUT)	Team Sky	+ 18"
9	Rüdiger Selig (GER)	Team Katusha	+ 18"
10	Adam Blythe (GBR)	BMC Racing Team	+ 19"

=== Stage 4 ===
8 February 2012 – Al Thakhira to Madinat ash Shamal, 147.5 km (91.7 mi)

Stage 4 Result

	Rider	Team	Time
1	Tom Boonen (BEL)	Omega Pharma–Quick-Step	3h 03' 14"
2	Tom Veelers (NED)	Project 1t4i	+ 0"
3	Fabian Cancellara (SUI)	RadioShack–Nissan	+ 0"
4	Juan Antonio Flecha (ESP)	Team Sky	+ 0"
5	Gert Steegmans (BEL)	Omega Pharma–Quick-Step	+ 4"
6	Nikolas Maes (BEL)	Omega Pharma–Quick-Step	+ 11"
7	Yoann Offredo (FRA)	FDJ–BigMat	+ 14"
8	Bernhard Eisel (AUT)	Team Sky	+ 14"
9	Tyler Farrar (USA)	Garmin–Barracuda	+ 14"
10	Ian Stannard (GBR)	Team Sky	+ 36"

General Classification after Stage 4

	Rider	Team	Time
1	Tom Boonen (BEL)	Omega Pharma–Quick-Step	9h 50' 50"
2	Tyler Farrar (USA)	Garmin–Barracuda	+ 31"
3	Juan Antonio Flecha (ESP)	Team Sky	+ 34"
4	Gert Steegmans (BEL)	Omega Pharma–Quick-Step	+ 36"
5	Bernhard Eisel (AUT)	Team Sky	+ 45"
6	Tom Veelers (NED)	Project 1t4i	+ 1' 00"
7	Fabian Cancellara (SUI)	RadioShack–Nissan	+ 1' 06"
8	Ramūnas Navardauskas (LTU)	Garmin–Barracuda	+ 1' 09"
9	Aidis Kruopis (LTU)	GreenEDGE	+ 1' 10"
10	Adam Blythe (GBR)	BMC Racing Team	+ 1' 14"

=== Stage 5 ===
9 February 2012 – Camel Race Track to Al Khor Corniche, 160 km (99.4 mi)

Stage 5 Result

	Rider	Team	Time
1	Mark Cavendish (GBR)	Team Sky	3h 30' 40"
2	Daniel Oss (ITA)	Liquigas–Cannondale	+ 0"
3	Peter Sagan (SVK)	Liquigas–Cannondale	+ 0"
4	John Degenkolb (GER)	Project 1t4i	+ 0"
5	Rüdiger Selig (GER)	Team Katusha	+ 0"
6	Allan Davis (AUS)	GreenEDGE	+ 0"
7	Arnaud Démare (FRA)	FDJ–BigMat	+ 0"
8	Andrea Guardini (ITA)	Farnese Vini–Selle Italia	+ 0"
9	Denis Galimzyanov (RUS)	Team Katusha	+ 0"
10	Greg Henderson (NZL)	Lotto–Belisol	+ 0"

General Classification after Stage 5

	Rider	Team	Time
1	Tom Boonen (BEL)	Omega Pharma–Quick-Step	13h 21' 30"
2	Tyler Farrar (USA)	Garmin–Barracuda	+ 31"
3	Juan Antonio Flecha (ESP)	Team Sky	+ 34"
4	Gert Steegmans (BEL)	Omega Pharma–Quick-Step	+ 36"
5	Bernhard Eisel (AUT)	Team Sky	+ 45"
6	Tom Veelers (NED)	Project 1t4i	+ 1' 00"
7	Mark Cavendish (GBR)	Team Sky	+ 1' 05"
8	Fabian Cancellara (SUI)	RadioShack–Nissan	+ 1' 06"
9	Ramūnas Navardauskas (LTU)	Garmin–Barracuda	+ 1' 09"
10	Aidis Kruopis (LTU)	GreenEDGE	+ 1' 10"

=== Stage 6 ===
10 February 2012 – Sealine Beach Resort to Doha Corniche, 120.5 km (74.9 mi)

Stage 6 Result

	Rider	Team	Time
1	Arnaud Démare (FRA)	FDJ–BigMat	2h 20' 44"
2	Denis Galimzyanov (RUS)	Team Katusha	+ 0"
3	Mark Renshaw (AUS)	Rabobank	+ 0"
4	Roger Kluge (GER)	Project 1t4i	+ 0"
5	Alexander Kristoff (NOR)	Team Katusha	+ 0"
6	Tyler Farrar (USA)	Garmin–Barracuda	+ 0"
7	Daniel Oss (ITA)	Liquigas–Cannondale	+ 0"
8	Allan Davis (AUS)	GreenEDGE	+ 0"
9	Aaron Kemps (AUS)	Champion System	+ 0"
10	Jens Debusschere (BEL)	Lotto–Belisol	+ 0"

Final General Classification

	Rider	Team	Time
1	Tom Boonen (BEL)	Omega Pharma–Quick-Step	15h 42' 14"
2	Tyler Farrar (USA)	Garmin–Barracuda	+ 28"
3	Juan Antonio Flecha (ESP)	Team Sky	+ 33"
4	Gert Steegmans (BEL)	Omega Pharma–Quick-Step	+ 34"
5	Tom Veelers (NED)	Project 1t4i	+ 1' 00"
6	Mark Cavendish (GBR)	Team Sky	+ 1' 05"
7	Fabian Cancellara (SUI)	RadioShack–Nissan	+ 1' 06"
8	Ramūnas Navardauskas (LTU)	Garmin–Barracuda	+ 1' 09"
9	Aidis Kruopis (LTU)	GreenEDGE	+ 1' 10"
10	Adam Blythe (GBR)	BMC Racing Team	+ 1' 14"

== Classification leadership ==
Stage	Winner	General Classification	Points Classification	Young Rider Classification	Teams Classification
1	Tom Boonen	Tom Boonen	Tom Boonen	Adam Blythe	Omega Pharma–Quick-Step
2	Garmin–Barracuda	Tom Boonen	Tom Boonen	Ramūnas Navardauskas	Garmin–Barracuda
3	Mark Cavendish	Tom Boonen	Tom Boonen	Rüdiger Selig	Garmin–Barracuda
4	Tom Boonen	Tom Boonen	Tom Boonen	Ramūnas Navardauskas	Omega Pharma–Quick-Step
5	Mark Cavendish	Tom Boonen	Tom Boonen	Ramūnas Navardauskas	Omega Pharma–Quick-Step
6	Arnaud Démare	Tom Boonen	Tom Boonen	Ramūnas Navardauskas	Omega Pharma–Quick-Step
Final		Tom Boonen	Tom Boonen	Ramūnas Navardauskas	Omega Pharma–Quick-Step
