= 2011 Paris–Roubaix =

2011 UCI World Tour, race 9 of 27
- Official event poster

Race details
- Dates: 10 April 2011
- Stages: 1
- Distance: 258 km (160.3 mi)
- Winning time: 6h 07' 28"

Results
	Winner	Johan Vansummeren (BEL)	(Garmin–Cervélo)
	Second	Fabian Cancellara (SUI)	(Leopard Trek)
	Third	Maarten Tjallingii (NED)	(Rabobank)

The 2011 Paris–Roubaix was the 109th running of the Paris–Roubaix single-day cycling race, often known as the Hell of the North. It was held on 10 April 2011 over a distance of 258 kilometres (160.3 miles) and was the ninth race of the 2011 UCI World Tour season.

Garmin–Cervélo's Johan Vansummeren claimed victory after making a solo breakaway from a four-man group with 15 kilometres (9.3 miles) remaining, holding on to win by 19 seconds at the velodrome in Roubaix. He also held on to victory, despite riding the final 5 kilometres (3.1 miles) with a flat rear tyre. Second place went to Leopard Trek rider and defending race winner Fabian Cancellara who caught the remaining riders from the breakaway – Maarten Tjallingii of Rabobank, Lars Bak of HTC–Highroad and Grégory Rast of Team RadioShack – and outsprinted them in Roubaix. Tjallingii completed the podium in third.

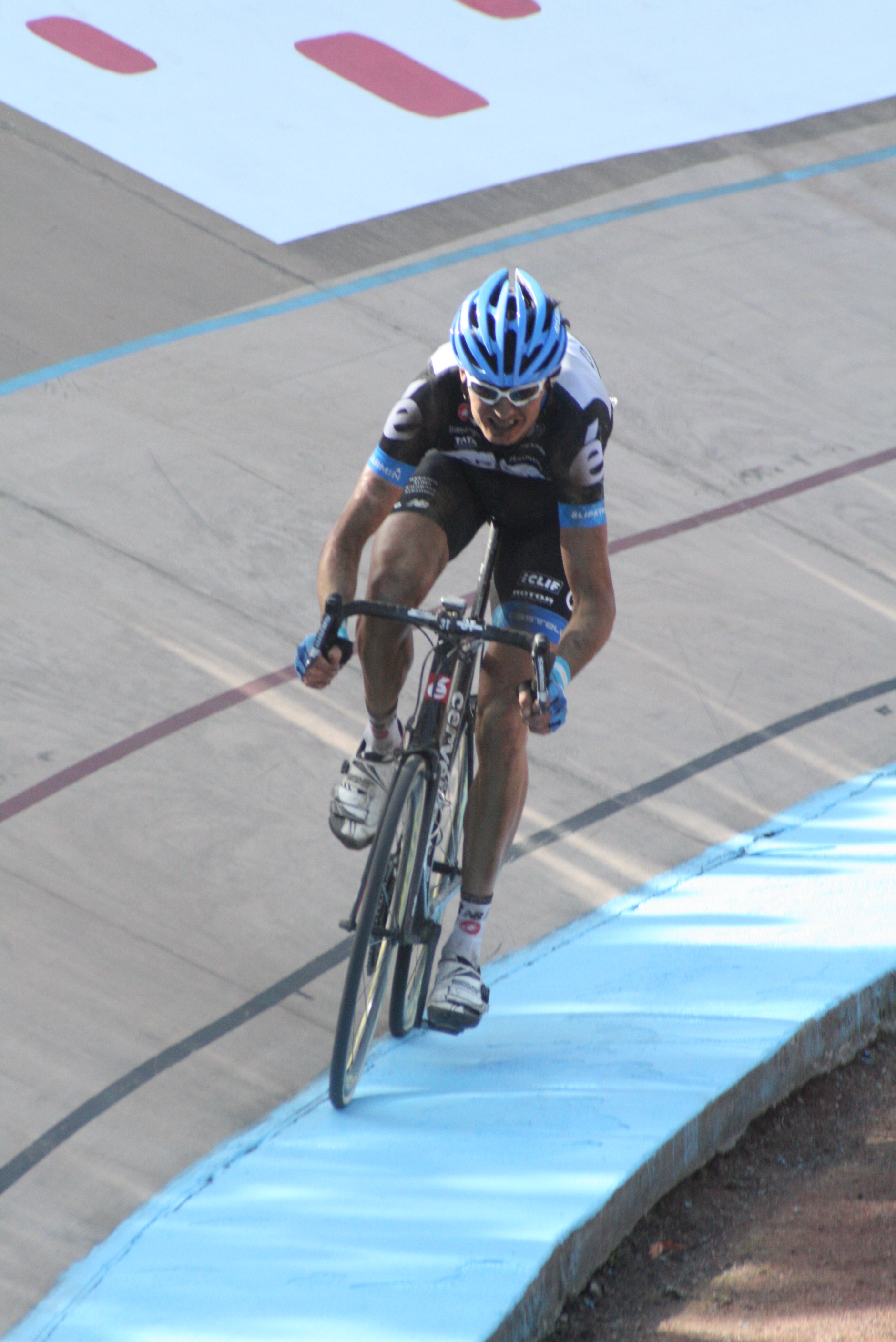
Johan Vansummeren en route to victory in Roubaix

== Teams ==
25 teams competed in the 2011 Paris–Roubaix. They were:

Teams for Paris-Roubaix

- Ag2r–La Mondiale
- Astana
- BMC Racing Team
- Euskaltel–Euskadi
- Garmin–Cervélo
- HTC–Highroad
- Lampre–ISD
- Leopard Trek
- Liquigas–Cannondale
- Omega Pharma–Lotto
- Quick-Step
- Rabobank
- Team Katusha
- Movistar Team
- Team RadioShack
- Saxo Bank–SunGard
- Team Sky
- Vacansoleil–DCM

Wild Cards

- Bretagne–Schuller
- Cofidis
- FDJ
- Saur–Sojasun
- Skil–Shimano
- Team Europcar
- Team NetApp

== Results ==
Results (1–10)
	Cyclist	Team	Time
1	Johan Vansummeren (BEL)	Garmin–Cervélo	6h 07' 28"
2	Fabian Cancellara (SUI)	Leopard Trek	+ 19"
3	Maarten Tjallingii (NED)	Rabobank	+ 19"
4	Grégory Rast (SUI)	Team RadioShack	+ 19"
5	Lars Bak (DEN)	HTC–Highroad	+ 21"
6	Alessandro Ballan (ITA)	BMC Racing Team	+ 36"
7	Bernhard Eisel (AUT)	HTC–Highroad	+ 47"
8	Thor Hushovd (NOR)	Garmin–Cervélo	+ 47"
9	Juan Antonio Flecha (ESP)	Team Sky	+ 47"
10	Mathew Hayman (AUS)	Team Sky	+ 47"

== See also ==
- 2011 in road cycling
