= 2007 Paris–Roubaix =

- Official event poster

Race details
- Dates: April 15, 2007
- Stages: 1
- Distance: 259 km (161 mi)
- Winning time: 6h 09' 07"

Results
	Winner	Stuart O'Grady (AUS)	(Team CSC)
	Second	Juan Antonio Flecha (ESP)	(Rabobank)
	Third	Steffen Wesemann (SUI)	(Wiesenhof–Felt)

The 2007 Paris–Roubaix was the 105th running of the Paris–Roubaix single-day cycling race, often known as the Hell of the North. It was held on 15 April 2007 over a distance of 259 kilometres (160.9 miles). Among the participating favorites were 2006 champion Fabian Cancellara and 2005 champion Tom Boonen. While the race has a flat parcours, the often poor weather and long sections of cobblestone roads which are traditionally incorporated make for a difficult race, rarely featuring an en masse sprint finish. The race was part of the 2007 UCI ProTour.

The race was won by Australian rider Stuart O'Grady of Team CSC from a breakaway.

== Race overview ==
The race was held in unseasonably warm weather, with temperatures up to 27°C.

Right from the start, several riders tried to be part of the traditional early breakaway, however, the peloton looked to be letting no one go. It was only after 31 kilometers that a group of 34 riders got away. The lead of the group never grew very big but in the chasing peloton a lot of the favorites were looking at each other. In the end, only a few of the favorites got away from the group: Tom Boonen, Leif Hoste, Marcus Burghardt and Staf Scheirlinckx. However, they also did not cooperate very well and in the end, a few of the survivors of the lead group were never to be seen again. Of those, Stuart O'Grady in the end proved to be the strongest. O'Grady had actually dropped from the lead group because of a puncture but had gotten back together with a few others, namely Juan Antonio Flecha, Steffen Wesemann and Björn Leukemans. Still, of the original breakaway group, five riders got into the top ten, which does not happen often in Paris–Roubaix. It should be mentioned, however, that Leif Hoste was knocked down by a motorbike on Carrefour de l'Arbre. Had he reached Tom Boonen, the race could have ended otherwise.

== Results ==
Results (1–10)
	Cyclist	Team	Time	UCI ProTour Points
1	Stuart O'Grady (AUS)	Team CSC	6h 09' 07"	50
2	Juan Antonio Flecha (ESP)	Rabobank	+ 52"	40
3	Steffen Wesemann (SUI)	Team Wiesenhof–Felt	+ 52"	none
4	Björn Leukemans (BEL)	Predictor–Lotto	+ 53"	30
5	Roberto Petito (ITA)	Liquigas	+ 55"	25
6	Tom Boonen (BEL)	Quick-Step–Innergetic	+ 55"	20
7	Roger Hammond (GBR)	T-Mobile Team	+ 55"	15
8	Enrico Franzoi (ITA)	Lampre–Fondital	+ 56"	10
9	Kevin van Impe (BEL)	Quick-Step–Innergetic	+ 1' 24"	5
10	Fabio Baldato (ITA)	Lampre–Fondital	+ 2' 27"	2
