= 2005 Paris–Roubaix =

Race details
- Dates: April 10, 2005
- Stages: 1
- Distance: 259 km (161 mi)
- Winning time: 6h 29' 38"

Results
	Winner	Tom Boonen (BEL)	(Quick-Step–Innergetic)
	Second	George Hincapie (USA)	(Discovery Channel)
	Third	Juan Antonio Flecha (ESP)	(Fassa Bortolo)

The 2005 Paris–Roubaix was the 103rd running of the Paris–Roubaix single-day cycling race, often known as the Hell of the North. It was held on 10 April 2005 over a distance of 259 kilometres (160.9 miles).

The route omitted the Trouée d'Arenberg, with organisers Amaury Sport Organisation citing safety concerns. However the route still included 54.7 km (34.0 mi) of cobblestones over 26 sectors, 2 km (1.2 mi) more than the 2004 edition. This edition was run under clear skies and relatively good weather.

In the previous Sunday's Tour of Flanders, Tom Boonen launched a surprise attack on his adversaries, surprising those who expected him to wait until the finale to launch his sprint. This time, Boonen patiently waited for the final group of three (with George Hincapie and Juan Antonio Flecha) to enter the velodrome together. Then he easily outsprinted the other riders in the final lap.

== Results ==
10-04-2005: Compiègne–Roubaix, 259 km.

Results (1–10)
	Cyclist	Team	Time
1	Tom Boonen (BEL)	Quick-Step–Innergetic	6h 29' 38"
2	George Hincapie (USA)	Discovery Channel	s.t.
3	Juan Antonio Flecha (ESP)	Fassa Bortolo	s.t.
4	Magnus Bäckstedt (SWE)	Liquigas–Bianchi	+ 1' 39"
5	Lars Michaelsen (DEN)	Team CSC	+ 2' 43"
6	Léon van Bon (NED)	Davitamon–Lotto	+ 3' 49"
7	Florent Brard (FRA)	Agritubel–Loudun	+ 3' 49"
8	Fabian Cancellara (SUI)	Fassa Bortolo	+ 3' 49"
9	Thor Hushovd (NOR)	Crédit Agricole	+ 3' 49"
10	Arnaud Coyot (FRA)	Cofidis	+ 3' 49"
