= 2005 Gent–Wevelgem =

Race details
- Dates: 6 April 2005
- Stages: 1
- Distance: 208 km (129 mi)
- Winning time: 4h 53' 07"

Results
	Winner	Nico Mattan (BEL)	(Davitamon–Lotto)
	Second	Juan Antonio Flecha (ESP)	(Fassa Bortolo)
	Third	Daniele Bennati (ITA)	(Lampre–Caffita)

The 67th edition of the Belgian Gent–Wevelgem cycling classic race was held over 208 kilometres from Deinze to Wevelgem on 6 April 2005. It was won in controversial circumstances by Nico Mattan of the Davitamon–Lotto team. After the race, Fassa Bortolo team director Giancarlo Ferreti lodged an appeal with the race jury, claiming that Mattan had used the slipstream of press and support vehicles to beat Fassa rider Juan Antonio Flecha. UCI officials blamed the vehicles rather than Mattan and upheld the race result.

== General standings ==
=== 06-04-2005: Gent–Wevelgem, 208 km. ===
Rank	Rider	Team	Time
1	Nico Mattan (BEL)	Davitamon–Lotto	4h 53'07"
2	Juan Antonio Flecha (ESP)	Fassa Bortolo	+ 2"
3	Daniele Bennati (ITA)	Lampre–Caffita	+ 9"
4	Fabian Cancellara (SUI)	Fassa Bortolo	s.t.
5	Thor Hushovd (NOR)	Crédit Agricole	s.t.
6	Baden Cooke (AUS)	Française des Jeux	+ 16"
7	Tom Steels (BEL)	Davitamon–Lotto	+ 18"
8	Simone Cadamuro (ITA)	Domina Vacanze	s.t.
9	Erik Zabel (GER)	T-Mobile Team	s.t.
10	Stuart O'Grady (AUS)	Cofidis	s.t.
