= 2013 Paris–Roubaix =

2013 UCI World Tour, race 10 of 28
- Official event poster

Race details
- Dates: 7 April 2013
- Stages: 1
- Distance: 254.5 km (158.1 mi)
- Winning time: 5h 45' 33"

Results
	Winner	Fabian Cancellara (SUI)	(RadioShack–Leopard)
	Second	Sep Vanmarcke (BEL)	(Blanco Pro Cycling)
	Third	Niki Terpstra (NED)	(Omega Pharma–Quick-Step)

The 2013 Paris–Roubaix was the 111th edition of the Paris–Roubaix race that took place on 7 April and was the tenth race of the 2013 UCI World Tour. The race stretched 254.5 km (158.1 mi) from start to finish and was won by Swiss rider Fabian Cancellara. Second and third were Belgian Sep Vanmarcke and Dutchman Niki Terpstra, respectively.

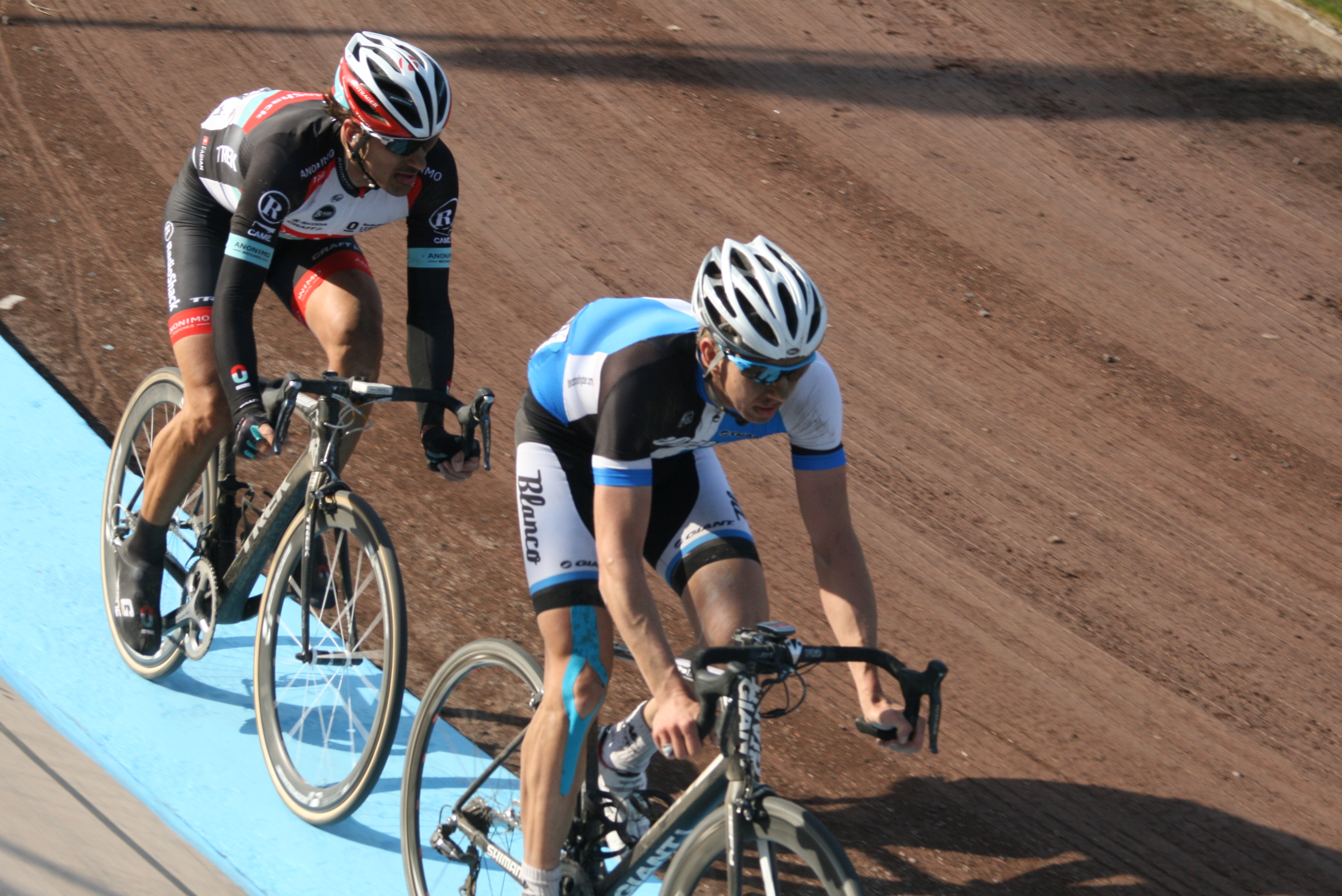
Fabian Cancellara (left) and Sep Vanmarcke (right) in the Roubaix Velodrome during the final meters of the race.

== Teams ==
As the Paris–Roubaix was a UCI World Tour event, all 19 UCI ProTeams were invited automatically and obligated to send a squad and the organizers invited six wild card teams to participate.

The 19 UCI ProTeams were:

- Ag2r–La Mondiale
- Argos–Shimano
- Astana
- Blanco Pro Cycling
- BMC Racing Team
- Cannondale
- Euskaltel–Euskadi
- FDJ
- Garmin–Sharp
- Orica–GreenEDGE
- Team Katusha
- Lampre–Merida
- Lotto–Belisol
- Movistar Team
- Omega Pharma–Quick-Step
- RadioShack–Leopard
- Saxo–Tinkoff
- Team Sky
- Vacansoleil–DCM

The wild cards invited were:

- Bretagne–Séché Environnement
- Cofidis
- IAM Cycling
- Sojasun
- Team Europcar
- NetApp–Endura

== Race overview ==
RadioShack–Leopard's Fabian Cancellara won the breathtaking sprint ahead of Sep Vanmarcke of Blanco Pro Cycling. Omega Pharma–Quick-Step's Niki Terpstra sealed the final place on the podium by winning the sprint amongst the chasing group.

== Results ==
Results (1–10)
	Cyclist	Team	Time
1	Fabian Cancellara (SUI)	RadioShack–Leopard	5h 45' 33"
2	Sep Vanmarcke (BEL)	Blanco Pro Cycling	s.t.
3	Niki Terpstra (NED)	Omega Pharma–Quick-Step	+ 31"
4	Greg Van Avermaet (BEL)	BMC Racing Team	+ 31"
5	Damien Gaudin (FRA)	Team Europcar	+ 31"
6	Zdeněk Štybar (CZE)	Omega Pharma–Quick-Step	+ 39"
7	Sebastian Langeveld (NED)	Orica–GreenEDGE	+ 39"
8	Juan Antonio Flecha (ESP)	Vacansoleil–DCM	+ 39"
9	Alexander Kristoff (NOR)	Team Katusha	+ 50"
10	Sébastien Turgot (FRA)	Team Europcar	+ 50"

== See also ==
- 2013 in road cycling
