= 2006 Tour of Flanders =

Tour of Flanders
2006 UCI ProTour, race 4 of 27
- Event poster with previous winner Tom Boonen

Race details
- Dates: 2 April 2006
- Stages: 1
- Distance: 258 km (160.3 mi)
- Winning time: 6h 30' 14"

Results
	Winner	Tom Boonen (BEL)	(Quick-Step–Innergetic)
	Second	Leif Hoste (BEL)	(Discovery Channel)
	Third	George Hincapie (USA)	(Discovery Channel)

The 2006 Tour of Flanders was the 90th edition of the Tour of Flanders cycling classic, taking place on 2 April 2006. World champion and last year's winner Tom Boonen was the favourite before the start and he won the second time in a row. He won the sprint from Leif Hoste, after both escaped 33 km before the finish.

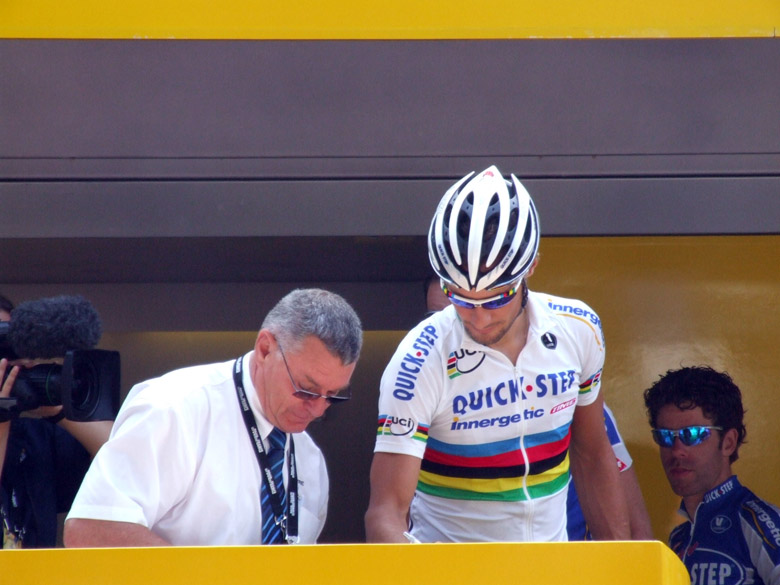
World champion Tom Boonen would win his second Tour of Flanders in row

== General standings ==
=== 02-04-2006: Brugge-Ninove, 258 km ===
	Cyclist	Team	Time
1	Tom Boonen (BEL)	Quick-Step–Innergetic	6h 30' 14"
2	Leif Hoste (BEL)	Discovery Channel	s.t.
3	George Hincapie (USA)	Discovery Channel	+ 1' 17"
4	Peter van Petegem (BEL)	Davitamon–Lotto	+ 1' 17"
5	Alessandro Ballan (ITA)	Lampre–Fondital	+ 1' 17"
6	Fabian Cancellara (SUI)	Team CSC	+ 1' 17"
7	Paolo Bettini (ITA)	Quick-Step–Innergetic	+ 1' 50"
8	Karsten Kroon (NED)	Team CSC	+ 1' 50"
9	Andreas Klier (GER)	T-Mobile Team	+ 1' 50"
10	Roberto Petito (ITA)	Tenax Salmilano	+ 1' 50"
