= 2010 Paris–Roubaix =

2010 UCI World Ranking, race 9 of 26
- Official event poster

Race details
- Dates: April 11, 2010
- Stages: 1
- Distance: 259 km (161 mi)
- Winning time: 6h 35' 10"

Results
	Winner	Fabian Cancellara (SUI)	(Team Saxo Bank)
	Second	Thor Hushovd (NOR)	(Cervélo TestTeam)
	Third	Juan Antonio Flecha (ESP)	(Team Sky)

The 2010 Paris–Roubaix was the 108th running of the Paris–Roubaix single-day cycling race, often known as the Hell of the North. It was held on 11 April 2010 over a distance of 259 kilometres (160.9 miles) and was the ninth event in the inaugural UCI World Ranking series. The race was won by Swiss rider Fabian Cancellara.

== Teams ==
There were 25 teams at the 2010 Paris–Roubaix, 14 of which were automatically invited following an agreement between organisers Amaury Sport Organisation (ASO) and cycling's governing body, the Union Cycliste Internationale. The other 11 teams were chosen by the organisers ASO.

Automatic invitations

- Ag2r–La Mondiale
- Bbox Bouygues Telecom
- Caisse d'Epargne
- Cofidis
- Team HTC–Columbia
- Euskaltel–Euskadi
- Française des Jeux
- Lampre–Farnese Vini
- Liquigas–Doimo
- Team Milram
- Omega Pharma–Lotto
- Quick-Step
- Rabobank
- Team Saxo Bank

Wildcards chosen by the organisers

- Acqua & Sapone
- Androni Giocattoli
- BMC Racing Team
- Cervélo TestTeam
- Garmin–Transitions
- Team Katusha
- Team RadioShack
- Saur–Sojasun
- Skil–Shimano
- Team Sky
- Vacansoleil

== Results ==
Results (1–10)
	Cyclist	Team	Time
1	Fabian Cancellara (SUI)	Team Saxo Bank	6h 35' 10"
2	Thor Hushovd (NOR)	Cervélo TestTeam	+ 2' 00"
3	Juan Antonio Flecha (ESP)	Team Sky	+ 2' 00"
4	Roger Hammond (GBR)	Cervélo TestTeam	+ 3' 14"
5	Tom Boonen (BEL)	Quick-Step	+ 3' 14"
6	Bjorn Leukemans (BEL)	Vacansoleil	+ 3' 20"
7	Filippo Pozzato (ITA)	Team Katusha	+ 3' 46"
8	Leif Hoste (BEL)	Omega Pharma–Lotto	+ 5' 16"
9	Sébastien Hinault (FRA)	Ag2r–La Mondiale	+ 6' 27"
10	Hayden Roulston (NZL)	Team HTC–Columbia	+ 6' 59"

== See also ==
- 2010 in Road Cycling
