= Leif Hoste =

Belgian cyclist

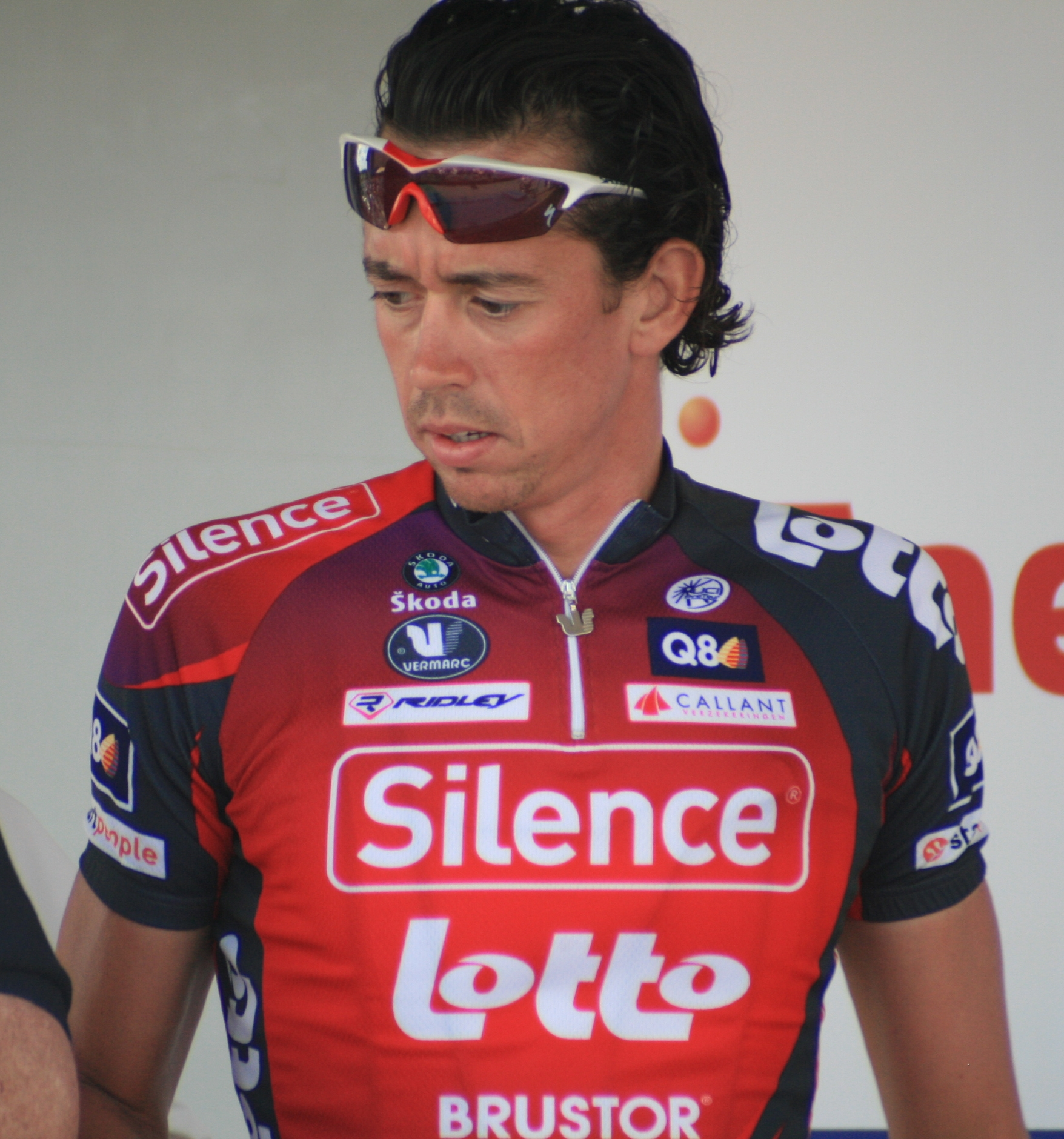
- Hoste at the 2008 Eneco Tour.

Personal information
- Full name: Leif Hoste
- Born: 17 July 1977 (age 49) Kortrijk, Belgium
- Height: 1.85 m (6 ft 1 in)
- Weight: 80 kg (176 lb)

Cycling career
- Sport: Cycling
- Current team: Retired
- Discipline: Road
- Role: Rider
- Rider type: Classics specialist/Time-trialist

Amateur team
- 1997: Mapei–GB (stagiaire)

Professional teams
- 1998: Vlaanderen 2002–Eddy Merckx
- 1999–2000: Mapei–Quick-Step
- 2001–2002: Domo–Farm Frites–Latexco
- 2003–2004: Lotto–Domo
- 2005–2006: Discovery Channel
- 2007–2010: Predictor–Lotto
- 2011: Team Katusha
- 2012: Accent.jobs–Willems Veranda's

Major wins
- National Time Trial Champion (2001, 2006, 2007)

Leif Hoste (born 17 July 1977) is a retired Belgian professional road racing cyclist, who last rode for UCI Professional Continental Team team Accent.jobs–Willems Veranda's. Born in Kortrijk, Hoste's career highlights included winning two stages and the overall title at the 2006 Three Days of De Panne, the 2001, 2006 and 2007 Belgian national time trial championships, and a second-place finish at the 2004, 2006 and 2007 one-day classic Tour of Flanders.

At the 2006 Paris–Roubaix, after finishing second, Hoste was disqualified by the race jury for illegally riding through a closed level crossing along with Peter Van Petegem and Vladimir Gusev (who were also disqualified).

On 29 March 2013, the Belgian cycling federation began a doping case against Hoste. On 13 July 2014 it was confirmed by the UCI that Hoste had been banned for two years until 29 December 2015 for biological passport irregularities.

== Major results ==
1998
1st Stage 1 Tour de l'Avenir
1st Stage 3 Circuito Montañés
1999
5th Overall Tour Trans-Canada
6th Grand Prix Eddy Merckx
9th Duo Normand
2000
1st Stage 3 Tour de Wallonie
3rd National Time Trial Championships
7th Grand Prix Eddy Merckx
2001
1st National Time Trial Championships
2002
9th Sparkassen Giro Bochum
2003
2nd National Time Trial Championships
2nd Kuurne–Brussels–Kuurne
3rd Grand Prix Eddy Merckx
2004
2nd Tour of Flanders
2nd Overall Tour de l'Ain
3rd National Time Trial Championships
6th Brussels–Ingooigem
6th Druivenkoers Overijse
8th Grand Prix Eddy Merckx
2005
3rd Overall Eneco Tour of Benelux
2006
1st National Time Trial Championships
1st Overall Three Days of De Panne

1st Mountains competition
1st Stages 1 & 4 (ITT)

2nd Kuurne–Brussels–Kuurne
2nd Tour of Flanders
~~2nd Paris–Roubaix~~ (DSQ)
2nd Eindhoven Team Time Trial
5th E3 Prijs Vlaanderen
2007
1st National Time Trial Championships
2nd Tour of Flanders
3rd Overall Tour of Belgium
4th Overall Eneco Tour
7th Overall Tour of Qatar
2008
2nd National Time Trial Championships
6th Paris–Roubaix
7th Omloop Het Volk
2009
~~4th Paris–Roubaix~~
~~8th Overall Three Days of De Panne~~
2010
~~3rd National Time Trial Championships~~
~~8th Paris–Roubaix~~
2011
7th Dwars door Vlaanderen
