= 2004 Tour of Flanders =

- Poster for the events in starting place Bruges

Race details
- Dates: 4 April 2004
- Stages: 1
- Distance: 242 km (150.4 mi)
- Winning time: 6h 39'

Results
	Winner	Steffen Wesemann (GER)	(Team Telekom)
	Second	Leif Hoste (BEL)	(Lotto–Domo)
	Third	Dave Bruylandts (BEL)	(Chocolade Jacques)

The 88th Tour of Flanders bicycle race in Belgium was held on 4 April 2004. It was the second leg of the UCI Road World Cup. German Steffen Wesemann won the monument classic ahead of Belgians Leif Hoste and Dave Bruylandts.

== Race Overview ==
American George Hincapie tried to spark a winning move on the Leberg. Frustrated, he found nobody to help him, particularly as Van Petegem's Lotto team had two men further up the road. Bruylandts was the next to give it a go, taking Serguei Ivanov with him as Michael Boogerd leapt across to catch the tail end of the move. They were soon caught by the group of favourites, but the attack signaled the coming of the crucial point in the race, with the often decisive climbs of the Tenbosse, the Muur and Bosberg still to come.

Van Petegem tried to go clear on the paved rise of the Tenbosse, but Bettini wouldn't let him go. By this point eight men were still away up front, but their advantage dwindled quickly as the more than 200 kilometres covered seemed to do nothing to blunt the speed of the peloton. The leaders were caught just before Geraardsbergen and the showdown was on the Muur with a big group of heavy-hitters still together.

The expected attacks by Van Petegem, Vandenbroucke, and Museeuw didn't materialize, leaving Wesemann and Bruylandts to spark the winning escape at the top of the Muur with Hoste in tow. Hoste, who had been away in some fashion all day long, avoided taking any pulls as the trio sped toward Meerbeke. The other two let him sit on, preferring to take their own chances rather than be caught up in a premature tactical battle. Hoste did close the gap when Bruylandts put in a last-kilometre attack, but it only served to set up the powerful Wesemann to take the sprint and claim his first ever World Cup victory.

On the day of this race, cycling legend and record holder for participations in the Tour of Flanders, Briek Schotte died at the age of 84. He also won the race twice and made the podium on six other occasions.

== Results ==
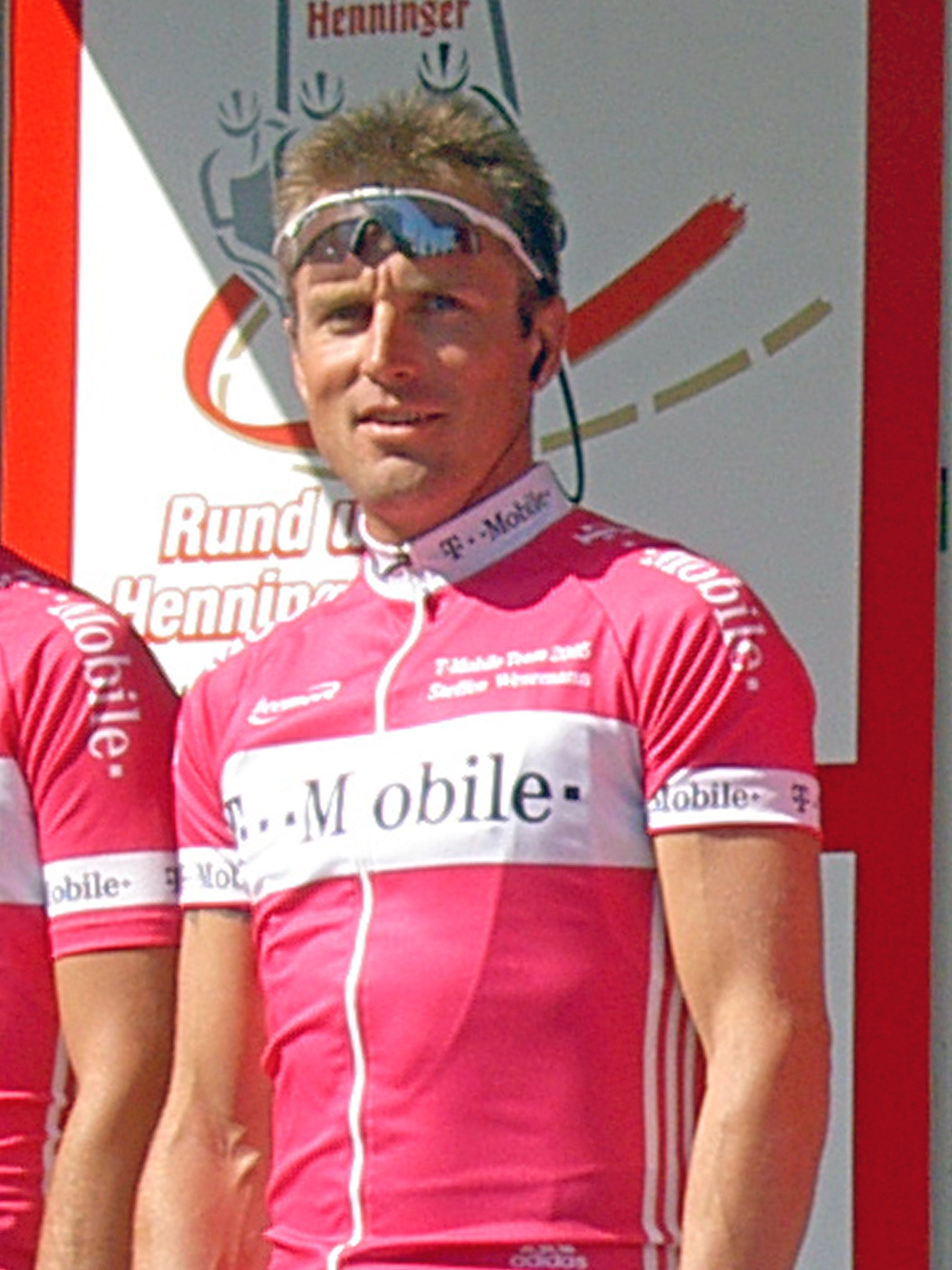
Steffen Wesemann, winner of the Tour of Flanders

	Cyclist	Team	Time
1	Steffen Wesemann (GER)	T-Mobile Team	6h 39' 00"
2	Leif Hoste (BEL)	Lotto–Domo	s.t.
3	Dave Bruylandts (BEL)	Chocolade Jacques–Wincor Nixdorf	s.t.
4	Léon van Bon (NED)	Lotto–Domo	+ 28"
5	Erik Dekker (NED)	Rabobank	s.t.
6	Andreas Klier (GER)	T-Mobile Team	s.t.
7	Rolf Aldag (GER)	T-Mobile Team	+ 1' 09"
8	Frank Høj (DEN)	Team CSC	+ 1' 16"
9	Paolo Bettini (ITA)	Quick-Step–Davitamon	s.t.
10	George Hincapie (USA)	U.S. Postal Service	s.t.
