= 2007 Tour of Flanders =

Tour of Flanders
2007 UCI ProTour
- Poster for the events in starting place Bruges

Race details
- Dates: April 8, 2007
- Stages: 1
- Distance: 255 km (158 mi)
- Winning time: 6h 10'15"

Results
	Winner	Alessandro Ballan (ITA)	(Lampre–Fondital)
	Second	Leif Hoste (BEL)	(Predictor–Lotto)
	Third	Luca Paolini (ITA)	(Liquigas)

The 2007 Tour of Flanders cycle race was the 91st edition of this monumental classic and took place on April 8.

The day's break formed at kilometer 29 and included José Vicente García (Caisse d'Epargne), Laurent Mangel (AG2R), Enrico Franzoi (Lampre), Maarten Tjallingii (Skil-Shimano), Aleksandr Kuschynski (Liquigas), Evert Verbist (Chocolade Jacques) and David Boucher (Landbouwkrediet). Shortly after the Berendries climb Fabian Cancellara made a successful move to bridge up to the break and was followed by Gert Steegmans.

The break was caught on the run-in to the Muur van Geraardsbergen and on the Muur the decisive attack came from Alessandro Ballan, who was followed by Leif Hoste. Pre-race favourite Tom Boonen (Quick-Step–Innergetic) could not respond to the attack, perhaps due to his fall earlier in the race that hurt his knees and wrist. Karsten Kroon and Tomas Vaitkus attempted to pursuit the two leaders but could not make it.

The lead duo worked together during the run-in to the finale. Ballan opened the sprint and was overtaken by Hoste, who looked to have won it, but Ballan managed to catch onto his wheel and pass him just before the line. Luca Paolini took 3rd, ahead of Kroon and Gusev. There was no Quick Step-Innergetic rider in the top ten.

== Course ==
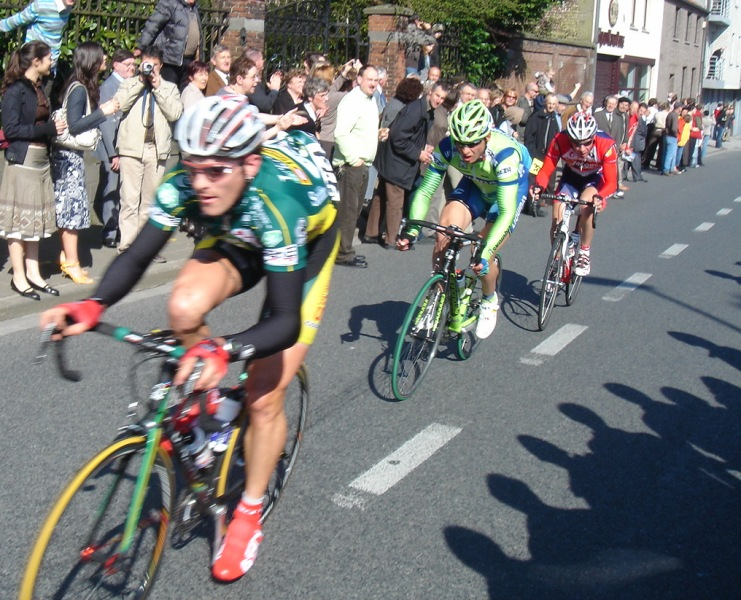
The riders in Lendelede (52 km from start).

The course includes 18 listed climbs and 22 sections of cobblestones:

· at km 96, WANNEGEMDORP - 400m cobbles
· at km 99, LEDE - 200m cobbles
· at km 100, EINE DOORN - 1700m cobbles
· around km 108, 300m cobbles
· at km 122, LIPPENHOVESTRAAT - 1200m cobbles
· at km 126, PADDESTRAAT – 2400m cobbles
· at km 128, ROBORST - 200m cobbles
· at km 134, (1) Molenberg w/300m cobbles
· at km 137, KERKGATE - 3000m cobbles
· at km 142, VOLKEGEM - 200m cobbles
· at km 143, (2) Wolvenberg
· at km 145, KATTENBERG - 1200m cobbles
· at km 165, (3) Kluisberg
· at km 173, (4) Knokteberg
· at km 180, (5) Oude Kwaremont w/1500m cobbles
· at km 183, (6) Paterberg w/400m cobbles
· at km 188, (7) Kortekeer
· at km 190, MARIABARRESTRAAT - 2100m cobbles
· at km 192, (8) Steenbeekdries w/800m cobbles
· at km 194, (9) Taaienberg w/800m cobbles
· at km 196, ONDERBOSSENAARSTR - 200m & 300m cobbles
· at km 199, (10) Eikenberg w/1200m cobbles
· at km 203, (11) Boigneberg
· at km 208, HAAGHOEK - 2000m cobbles
· at km 211, (12) Leberg
· at km 215, (13) Berendries
· at km 220, (14) Valkenberg
· at km 226, (15) Tenbosse
· at km 232, (16) Eikenmolen
· at km 241, VESTEN – 700m cobbles
· at km 243, (17) Muur – Kapelmuur w/700m cobbles
· at km 247, (18) Bosberg w/400m cobbles

== General standings ==
=== 2007-04-08: Brugge-Meerbeke, 255 km. ===
	Cyclist	Team	Time	UCI ProTour Points
1	Alessandro Ballan (ITA)	Lampre–Fondital	6h 10' 15"	50
2	Leif Hoste (BEL)	Predictor–Lotto	s.t.	40
3	Luca Paolini (ITA)	Liquigas	+ 5"	35
4	Karsten Kroon (NED)	Team CSC	+ 5"	30
5	Vladimir Gusev (RUS)	Discovery Channel	+ 5"	25
6	Tomas Vaitkus (LTU)	Discovery Channel	+ 13"	20
7	Nick Nuyens (BEL)	Cofidis	+ 13"	15
8	Dimitry Muravyev (KAZ)	Astana	+ 13"	10
9	Michael Boogerd (NED)	Rabobank	+ 13"	5
10	Stuart O'Grady (AUS)	Team CSC	+ 35"	2
