= 2005 Tour of Flanders =

Tour of Flanders
2005 UCI ProTour, race 4 of 29
- Poster for the events in starting place Bruges

Race details
- Dates: 3 April 2005
- Stages: 1
- Distance: 256 km (159.1 mi)
- Winning time: 6h 22'

Results
	Winner	Tom Boonen (BEL)	(Quick Step - Innergetic)
	Second	Andreas Klier (GER)	(T-Mobile Team)
	Third	Peter Van Petegem (BEL)	(Lotto-Domo)

The 89th edition of the Tour of Flanders cycling classic saw the emergence of Tom Boonen in the Flemish classics.

== Race overview ==
This edition was run under clear skies and good weather. Even past the feared Muur van Geraardsbergen there were still a handful of riders in the front group: favorites Tom Boonen (Quick Step-Innergetic) and Peter Van Petegem (Davitamon-Lotto), Erik Zabel and Andreas Klier (T-Mobile), Roberto Petito (Fassa Bortolo), and Alessandro Ballan (Lampre). Klier set the tempo to keep the group together for a final sprint, hoping for Zabel to win.

Given Boonen's reputation as a sprinter, he surprised his adversaries by launching a solo attack in the run-in to the finish to counter van Petegem's attack, after the Bosberg climb. Despite being chased by the two T-Mobile riders, he managed to take a solo win to Meerbeke.

== General standings ==
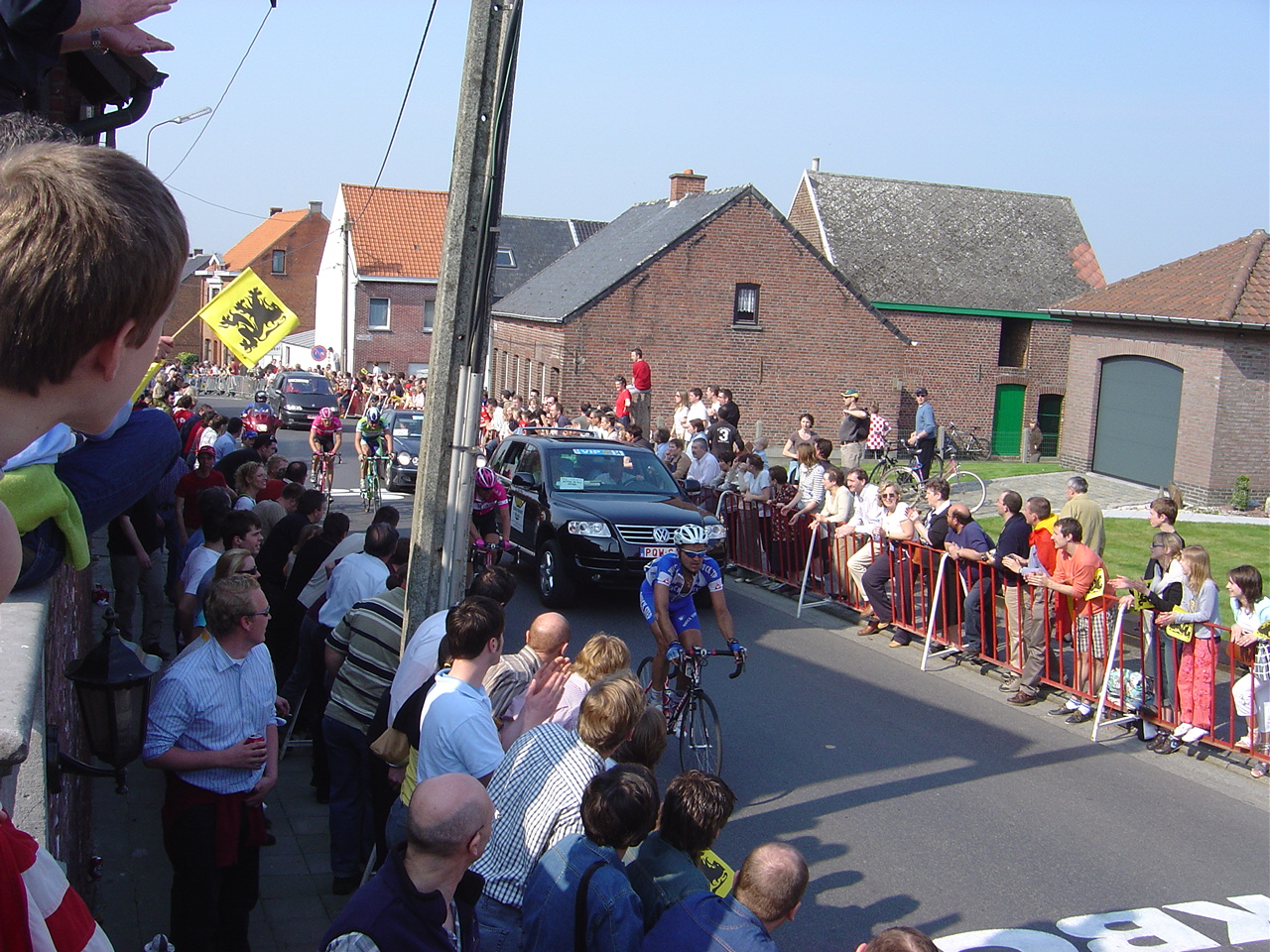
Tenbosse street in Nederbrakel during the 2005 Tour of Flanders

3 April 2005, Brugge-Meerbeke, 256 km.

	Cyclist	Team	Time
1	Tom Boonen (BEL)	Quick-Step–Innergetic	6h 22' 00"
2	Andreas Klier (GER)	T-Mobile Team	+ 35"
3	Peter van Petegem (BEL)	Davitamon–Lotto	+ 40"
4	Erik Zabel (GER)	T-Mobile Team	+ 40"
5	Roberto Petito (ITA)	Fassa Bortolo	+ 40"
6	Alessandro Ballan (ITA)	Lampre–Caffita	+ 40"
7	George Hincapie (USA)	Discovery Channel	+ 1' 42"
8	Léon van Bon (NED)	Davitamon–Lotto	+ 1' 42"
9	Sergei Ivanov (RUS)	T-Mobile Team	+ 1' 42"
10	Vladimir Gusev (RUS)	Team CSC	+ 1' 42"
