= Matti Breschel =

Danish road bicycle racer

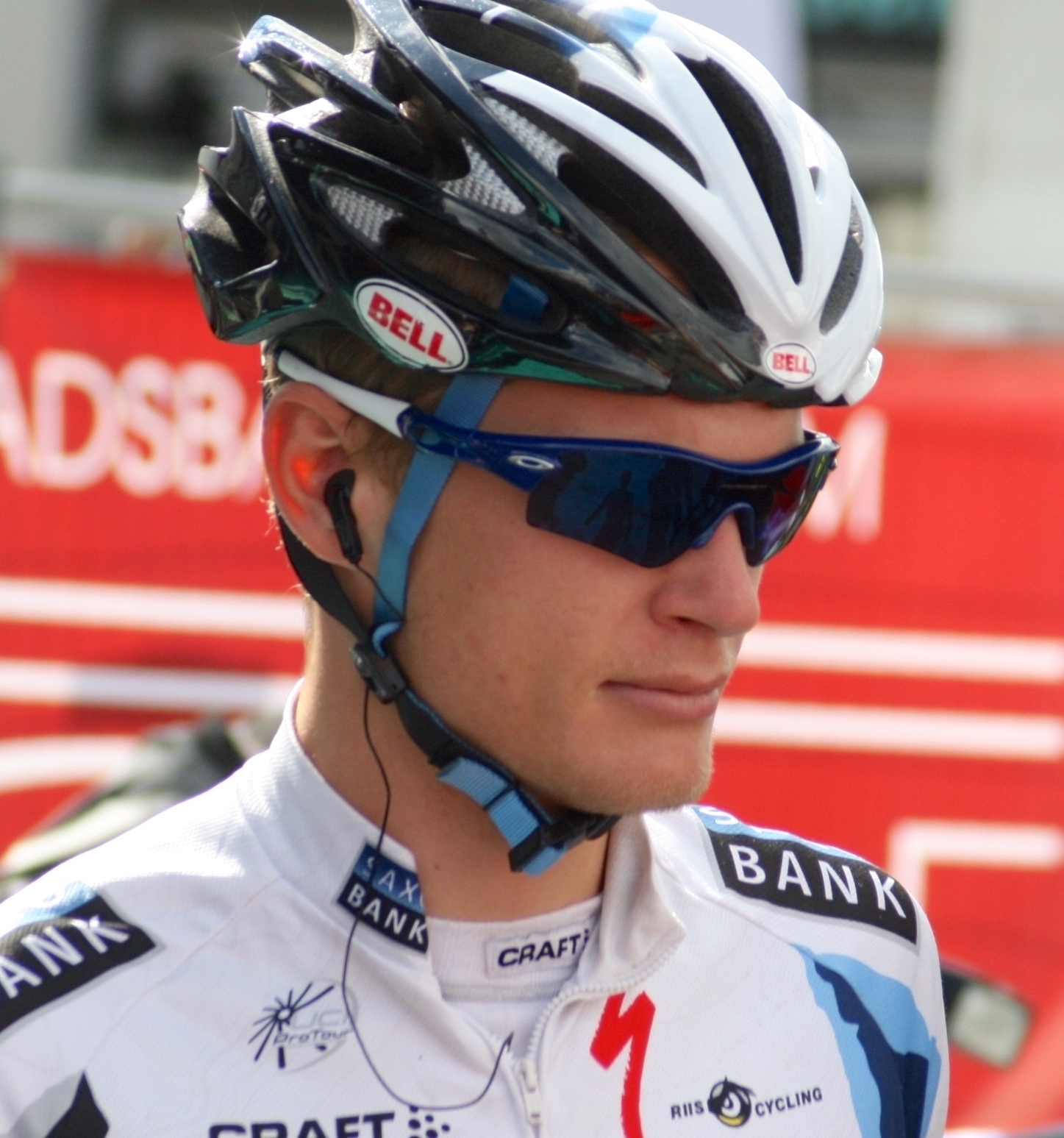
- Breschel at the 2009 E3 Prijs Vlaanderen.

Personal information
- Full name: Matti Breschel
- Born: 31 August 1984 (age 42) Ballerup, Denmark
- Height: 1.81 m (5 ft 11 in)
- Weight: 68 kg (150 lb; 10.7 st)

Cycling career
- Sport: Cycling
- Discipline: Road
- Role: Rider
- Rider type: Classics specialist; Sprinter

Professional teams
- 2005–2010: Team CSC
- 2011–2012: Rabobank
- 2013–2015: Saxo–Tinkoff
- 2016: Cannondale
- 2017: Astana
- 2018–2019: EF Education First–Drapac p/b Cannondale

Major wins
- Grand Tours Vuelta a España 1 individual stage (2008) Stage races Tour de Luxembourg (2014) One-day races and Classics National Road Race Championships (2009) Dwars door Vlaanderen (2010)
Medal record
Representing Denmark
Men's road bicycle racing
World Championships
Silver medal – second place	2010 Melbourne	Road race
Bronze medal – third place	2008 Varese	Road race

Matti Breschel (born 31 August 1984) is a Danish retired professional road racing cyclist, who competed between 2005 and 2019 for the Rabobank, Tinkoff–Saxo, Astana and EF Education First teams.

== Career ==
=== Junior career ===
Born in Ballerup, Breschel got his breakthrough with small Danish Team PH, finishing 6th at the U/23 Cycling World Championship in Verona in 2004, where he helped fellow Dane Mads Christensen finish 3rd. He also won the bronze medal at the Danish National Road Racing Championship during the summer of 2004.

=== Team CSC (2005–2010) ===
==== 2005 ====
He turned professional for the 2005 season in Denmark-based Team CSC, where he signed a two-year contract. At the press conference, regarding his choice to join Team CSC in October 2004, he stated that he simply wished to adjust to the rigours of professional cycling, saying,"I hope to get in the team, but in the beginning I just want to learn the game and to learn the races. Somewhere I know that I'm in for a beating." Under the tutelage of seasoned veteran Lars Michaelsen, Breschel would start the season in the Tour of Qatar, where the two riders finished side by side, Breschel conceding the final victory to Michaelsen. They would ride a number of classics and smaller races together, and Breschel finished in a number of secondary placings, just missing the victory podiums.

==== 2006 ====
For the start of the 2006 season, he once again showed himself in the Tour of Qatar, finishing as the best young rider of the race for the second year in a row. He showed his good form in March with a third-place finish in Le Samyn, being beaten only by Philippe Gilbert in the bunch sprint of the peloton, and a few days later he sprinted his way to second place at stage 2 of the Driedaagse van West-Vlaanderen where he was second only to world class sprinter Robbie McEwen. For the third, and last, stage of the race, Breschel would once more sprint against McEwen, with the winner taking the overall victory of the race, this time with the effect that both riders crashed. Breschel broke his vertebrae in two places, and McEwen was de-classed in the race.

==== 2007 ====
He came back with thunder and lightning in 2007 and came in an impressive 14th at the Paris–Roubaix, which his team-mate Stuart O'Grady won. After recovering, he won his first victory as a professional in stage 2 of Danmark Rundt in August 2007. This was the first Danish stage win in five years on this national tour.

==== 2008 ====
In 2008, his best season came, and he got his first big international breakthrough when he on 8 June 2008, he won the Philadelphia International Championship, also known as the Commerce Bank International Championship in Philadelphia, PA, where he outsprinted all contenders in a little bunch sprint after a long and hard race. A couple of weeks later, he went on to take another impressive victory when he won the 2nd stage of Ster Elektrotoer, a stage finishing on the feared Cauberg and also won the overall points jersey. He maintained his good form through the season and also came in 2nd in the Danish Road Racing Championship, only beaten by his teammate Nicki Sørensen. In August, he won two stages at the Tour of Denmark and also led the overall classification until the final time trial, securing him a total fifth place.

The biggest scalp came on 21 September, when he won the last stage of the Vuelta a España in Madrid, only a few days after he came in second in the 17th stage of the Vuelta a España. Only a week later, Breschel rode very impressively at the world cycling championships, finishing 3rd and getting a bronze medal.

==== 2009 ====
Breschel had his best cobbled classics campaign ever in 2009. He managed to finish 6th at the Tour of Flanders and 9th at the Paris-Roubaix. In June he became the Danish National Road Race Champion, and he also won stages in the Tour de Suisse, Volta a Catalunya, Tour de Luxembourg and Post Danmark Rundt. He managed to finish 2nd at the Vattenfall Cyclassics.

==== 2010 ====
During the 2010 season, Breschel rode well in the Cobbled Classics but suffered from bad luck. Breschel won Dwars door Vlaanderen and put in strong performances in Gent–Wevelgem and Ronde Vlaanderen, but suffered mechanical defects in both races.

=== Rabobank (2011–2012) ===
He signed for Rabobank for the 2011 and 2012 seasons. In the 2012 Paris–Roubaix, he was troubled by a knee injury. However, a week before that, he had finished 9th at the Tour of Flanders. He was also on the podium at the Gent-Wevelgem.

Breschel left Rabobank at the end of the 2012 season, and joined the Danish team Saxo–Tinkoff on a two-year contract from the 2013 season onwards.

=== Saxo-Tinkoff (2013–2015) ===
In his return to the former Team CSC squad, Breschel managed to pick up four stage wins at the Danmark Rundt – two each in 2013 and 2015. He also won 2 stages and the overall at the Tour de Luxembourg.

=== Cannondale (2016) ===
Breschel signed for Cannondale for the 2016 season. He rode the Tour de France but abandoned the race on stage 14 after crashing. His best results in the season were 5th at the GP du canton d'Argovie and 6th at Heistse Pijl.

=== Astana (2017) ===
Breschel did not have the best year at Astana, and his best result was 12th at Dwaars door Vlaanderen, a race he had previously won in 2010.

=== EF Education First–Drapac (2018–2019) ===
Breschel returned to the EF Education First–Drapac p/b Cannondale team after a year in Astana colours. He finished 9th on a wet stage 5 in the Paris-Nice. At the Milan-San Remo, Breschel sprinted home in 12th position.

He announced his retirement on 18 August 2019, effective from the end of the season, due to psoriatic arthritis.

== Major results ==
2001
National Junior Road Championships

1st Road race
3rd Time trial

2003
6th Fyen Rundt
2004
1st Giro del Canavese
1st Stage 3 Circuit des Ardennes
1st Stage 2 Ringerike GP
3rd Road race, National Road Championships
6th Road race, UCI Under-23 Road World Championships
6th Paris–Roubaix Espoirs
10th Overall Le Triptyque des Monts et Châteaux
2005
2nd Overall Tour of Qatar

1st Young rider classification

3rd Road race, National Road Championships
4th GP Herning
4th Paris–Bourges
4th Grand Prix d'Isbergues
5th Overall Circuit Franco-Belge
2006
3rd Overall Driedaagse van West-Vlaanderen

1st Young rider classification

3rd Le Samyn
6th Overall Tour of Qatar

1st Young rider classification

7th Reading Classic
2007
Tour of Ireland

1st Points classification
1st Stage 2

3rd Overall Danmark Rundt

1st Stage 2

3rd GP Herning
4th Overall Ster Elektrotoer
7th Paris–Bourges
9th Overall Sachsen Tour
2008
1st Philadelphia International Championship
1st Stage 21 Vuelta a España
2nd Road race, National Road Championships
3rd Road race, UCI Road World Championships
5th Overall Danmark Rundt

1st Points classification
1st Stages 2 & 3

5th Overall Ster Elektrotoer

1st Stage 2

6th Trofeo Laigueglia
7th E3 Prijs Vlaanderen
8th Paris–Bourges
2009
1st Road race, National Road Championships
1st Stage 4 Tour de Suisse
1st Stage 2 Volta a Catalunya
2nd Vattenfall Cyclassics
3rd Overall Tour of Ireland

1st Young rider classification

4th Overall Tour de Luxembourg

1st Points classification
1st Stage 4

5th Overall Danmark Rundt

1st Points classification
1st Stage 1

6th Tour of Flanders
7th Road race, UCI Road World Championships
10th Paris–Roubaix
2010
1st Dwars door Vlaanderen
2nd Road race, UCI Road World Championships
2nd Gran Piemonte
3rd Paris–Bourges
5th Overall Danmark Rundt

1st Points classification
1st Stage 3

8th Gent–Wevelgem
2012
1st Stage 3 Vuelta a Burgos
3rd Gent–Wevelgem
7th Trofeo Palma de Mallorca
9th Tour of Flanders
2013
3rd Overall Danmark Rundt

1st Stages 2 & 3

4th Road race, National Road Championships
8th Grand Prix Cycliste de Québec
9th Vattenfall Cyclassics
2014
1st Overall Tour de Luxembourg

1st Points classification
1st Stages 2 & 3

4th Road race, UCI Road World Championships
5th Overall Tour de l'Eurométropole
9th Paris–Bourges
2015
6th E3 Harelbeke
7th Vattenfall Cyclassics
8th Overall Danmark Rundt

1st Points classification
1st Stages 3 & 4

10th Overall Tour de Wallonie
2016
5th Grand Prix of Aargau Canton
6th Heistse Pijl
2018
3rd Japan Cup

=== Grand Tour general classification results timeline ===
Grand Tour	2007	2008	2009	2010	2011	2012	2013	2014	2015	2016	2017	2018	2019
Giro d'Italia	119	—	—	—	—	—	DNF	—	—	—	—	—	DNF
Tour de France	—	—	—	142	—	—	—	—	—	DNF	—	—	—
Vuelta a España	—	48	68	—	DNF	159	—	—	—	—	—	—	—

=== Classics & Monuments results timeline ===
Monument	2005	2006	2007	2008	2009	2010	2011	2012	2013	2014	2015	2016	2017	2018	2019
Milan–San Remo	119	—	60	39	134	11	—	31	73	—	12	—	23	12	—
Tour of Flanders	DNF	—	DNF	57	6	15	—	9	25	DNF	73	DNF	32	98	80
Paris–Roubaix	58	—	14	20	9	DNF	—	—	15	—	97	—	99	35	60
Liège–Bastogne–Liège	Did not contest during career														
Giro di Lombardia	—	—	—	—	—	DNF	—	—	49	—	—	—	—	DNF	—
Classic	2005	2006	2007	2008	2009	2010	2011	2012	2013	2014	2015	2016	2017	2018	2019
Omloop Het Nieuwsblad	—	27	—	134	36	76	—	30	—	—	—	—	19	89	104
Kuurne–Brussels–Kuurne	DNF	DNF	—	109	17	DNF	—	123	NH	—	—	—	88	40	DNF
Strade Bianche	DNE		—	25	20	11	—	—	—	—	—	—	—	—	—
Dwars door Vlaanderen	43	—	61	18	DNF	1	—	—	—	—	12	—	12	—	—
E3 Harelbeke	DNF	—	77	7	33	DNF	—	11	52	—	6	—	DNF	—	—
Gent–Wevelgem	17	—	85	20	15	8	—	3	13	72	DNF	DNF	DNF	—	—
Clásica de San Sebastián	—	—	—	—	—	—	12	DNF	86	—	—	—	—	DNF	—
Vattenfall Cyclassics	DNF	DNF	15	—	2	DNF	—	—	9	19	7	—	31	—	DNF
Paris–Tours	17	—	107	17	—	25	—	DNF	—	14	DNF	—	—	88	—

=== Major championships timeline ===
Event		2003	2004	2005	2006	2007	2008	2009	2010	2011	2012	2013	2014	2015	2016	2017	2018
Olympic Games	Road race	—	—	Not Held			—	Not Held			42	Not Held			—	Not Held	
World Championships	Road race	—	—	—	—	DNF	3	7	2	—	DNF	DNF	4	33	DNF	—	DNF
National Championships	Road race	7	3	3	6	—	2	1	7	10	—	4	7	—	14	44	DNF

Legend
—	Did not compete
DNF	Did not finish
NH	Not held
