= List of career achievements by André Greipel =

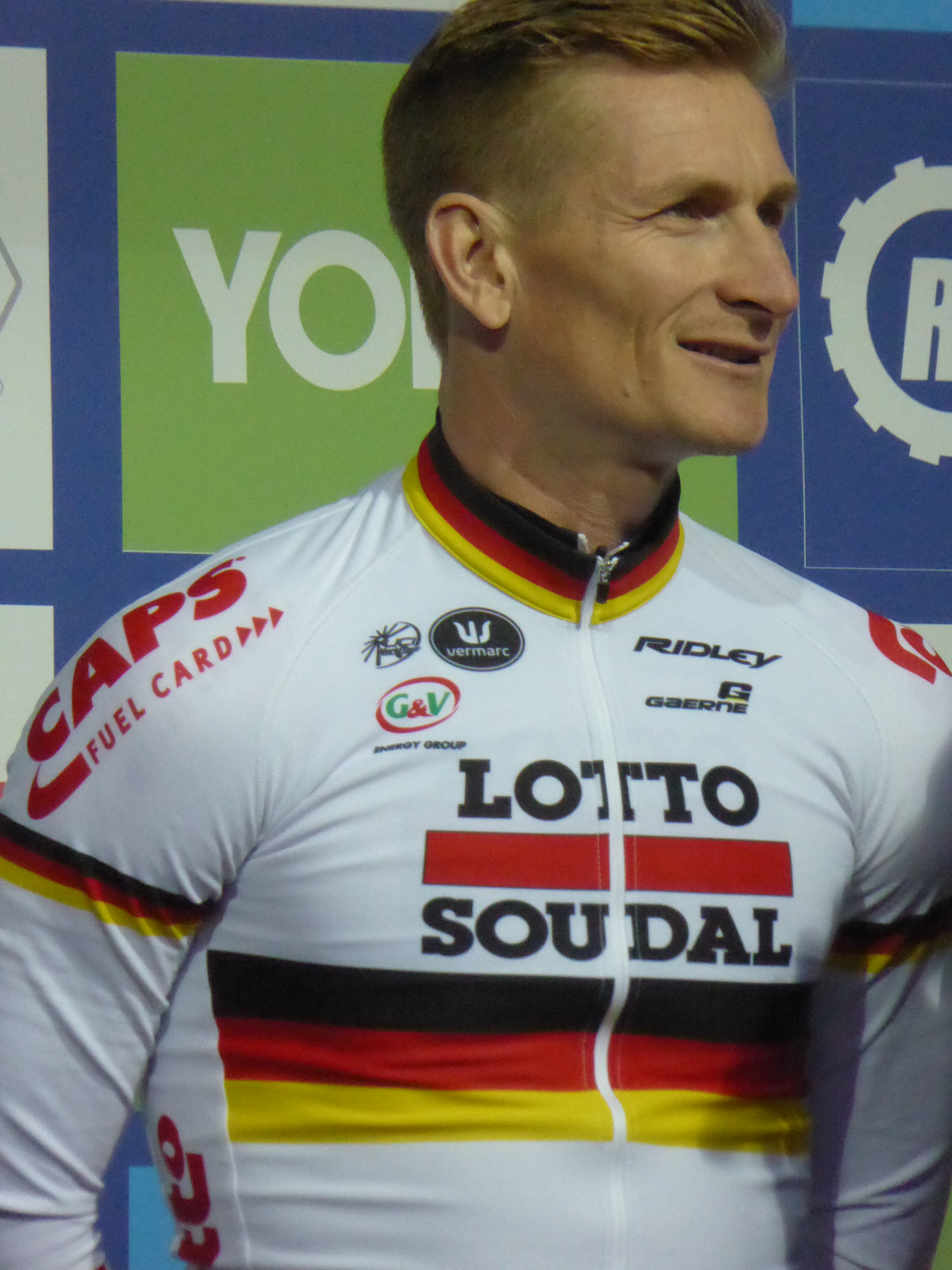
André Greipel at the 2016 Tour of Britain. During his twenty-year cycling career, Greipel accumulated over 150 professional victories.

This is a list of career achievements by André Greipel, a German former professional road bicycle racer, who rode professionally between 2002 and 2021. Greipel is noted as one of the best sprinters of his generation and is a winner of a number of one-day races and stage races. Greipel won 22 Grand Tour stages during his career; eleven at the Tour de France, seven at the Giro d'Italia and four at the Vuelta a España.

== Major results ==
2003
1st Grand Prix de Waregem
1st Stage 1 Tour de Berlin
1st Stage 2 Thüringen Rundfahrt der U23
9th Rund um Düren
2004
Grand Prix Guillaume Tell

1st Prologue & Stage 4b

1st Stage 3 Tour du Loir-et-Cher
1st Stage 1 Thüringen Rundfahrt der U23
3rd Under-23 race, National Cyclo-cross Championships
6th Grand Prix de Waregem
9th Road race, UEC European Under-23 Road Championships
2005
4th Memorial Rik Van Steenbergen
4th Rund um die Nürnberger Altstadt
10th Overall Danmark Rundt

1st Stage 6

2006
Rheinland-Pfalz Rundfahrt

1st Stages 1 & 4

Cologne Classic

1st Stages 1 & 2

8th Münsterland Giro
2007
Sachsen Tour

1st Stages 1 & 2

4th Time trial, National Road Championships
2008
1st Overall Tour Down Under

1st Points classification
1st Stages 2, 4, 5 & 6

1st Down Under Classic
1st Rund um die Nürnberger Altstadt
1st Kampioenschap van Vlaanderen
1st Münsterland Giro
1st Stage 17 Giro d'Italia
1st Stage 4 Tour of Austria
1st Stage 4 Deutschland Tour
3rd Nokere Koerse
5th Overall Eneco Tour

1st Stage 2

10th Overall Sachsen Tour

1st Stages 1 & 3

2009
1st Paris–Bourges
1st Neuseen Classics
1st Philadelphia International Championship
Vuelta a España

1st Points classification
1st Stages 4, 5, 16 & 21

Bayern Rundfahrt

1st Stages 1, 3 & 5

Ster Elektrotoer

1st Stages 2, 3 & 5

Tour of Austria

1st Stages 1, 6 & 8

1st Stage 7 Tour de Pologne
1st Stage 1 Tour Down Under
1st Stage 1 Sachsen Tour
4th Overall Four Days of Dunkirk

1st Stage 6

4th Cancer Council Helpline Classic
6th Münsterland Giro
2010
1st Overall Tour Down Under

1st Sprints classification
1st Stages 1, 2 & 4

1st Trofeo Magaluf-Palmanova
Tour of Britain

1st Stages 1, 6 & 8

Tour of Austria

1st Points classification
1st Stages 1 & 6

Tour de Pologne

1st Stages 2 & 7

Eneco Tour

1st Stages 2 & 6

Volta ao Algarve

1st Points classification
1st Stage 2

1st Stage 18 Giro d'Italia
2nd Trofeo Cala Millor
2nd Rund um Köln
3rd Sparkassen Giro Bochum
3rd Vattenfall Cyclassics
8th Overall Tour of Turkey

1st Points classification
1st Stages 1 (ITT), 2, 5, 6 & 8

2011
Tour of Belgium

1st Points classification
1st Stages 2 & 5

Eneco Tour

1st Stages 1 & 2

1st Stage 10 Tour de France
1st Stage 4 Volta ao Algarve
1st Stage 1 Three Days of De Panne
1st Stage 6 Tour of Turkey
2nd Memorial Rik Van Steenbergen
2nd Kampioenschap van Vlaanderen
3rd Road race, UCI Road World Championships
3rd Kuurne–Brussels–Kuurne
4th Road race, National Road Championships
4th Gent–Wevelgem
7th Overall Tour Down Under
2012
1st Down Under Classic
1st ProRace Berlin
1st Grand Prix Impanis-Van Petegem
Tour de France

1st Stages 4, 5 & 13

Tour of Belgium

1st Points classification
1st Stages 1, 2 & 3

Tour de Luxembourg

1st Points classification
1st Stages 1 & 2

Tour Down Under

1st Stages 1, 3 & 6

Tour of Oman

1st Stages 1 & 4

1st Stage 2 Tour of Turkey
1st Stage 2 Ster ZLM Toer
2nd Overall World Ports Classic
2nd Vattenfall Cyclassics
4th Memorial Rik Van Steenbergen
5th Eschborn–Frankfurt – Rund um den Finanzplatz
6th Overall Danmark Rundt

1st Stages 1 & 2

10th Kuurne–Brussels–Kuurne
10th Münsterland Giro
2013
1st Road race, National Road Championships
1st Cancer Council Helpline Classic
1st Ronde van Zeeland Seaports
1st Brussels Cycling Classic
Tour Down Under

1st Stages 1, 4 & 6

Tour of Turkey

1st Points classification
1st Stages 4 & 5

Tour of Belgium

1st Points classification
1st Stages 1 & 2

1st Stage 6 Tour de France
1st Stage 1 Tour Méditerranéen
1st Stage 4 Eneco Tour
2nd Overall Ster ZLM Toer

1st Points classification

2nd Vattenfall Cyclassics
2nd Grand Prix de Fourmies
3rd Eschborn–Frankfurt – Rund um den Finanzplatz
3rd ProRace Berlin
9th Grote Prijs Jef Scherens
2014
1st Road race, National Road Championships
1st Brussels Cycling Classic
1st Grote Prijs Jef Scherens
1st Münsterland Giro
Tour of Oman

1st Points classification
1st Stages 1, 3 & 6

Tour Down Under

1st Stages 4 & 6

Tour de Luxembourg

1st Stages 1 & 4

1st Stage 6 Tour de France
1st Stage 4 Tour of Belgium
1st Stage 4 Ster ZLM Toer
2nd Down Under Classic
7th Overall World Ports Classic

1st Stage 1

10th Overall Tour of Qatar

1st Stage 5

2015
1st Overall Ster ZLM Toer

1st Points classification
1st Stages 1 & 2

1st Vattenfall Cyclassics
Tour de France

1st Stages 2, 5, 15 & 21
Held after Stages 2–7, 10

Eneco Tour

1st Points classification
1st Stage 2

Tour de Luxembourg

1st Points classification
1st Stages 1 & 3

1st Stage 6 Giro d'Italia
1st Stage 2 Paris–Nice
1st Stage 4 Tour of Turkey
1st Stage 7 Tour of Britain
1st Stage 5 Volta ao Algarve
2nd Trofeo Playa de Palma
8th Trofeo Santanyi–Ses Salines-Campos
10th Overall Three Days of De Panne
2016
1st Road race, National Road Championships
1st Trofeo Felanitx-Ses Salines–Campos-Porreres
1st Trofeo Playa de Palma
Giro d'Italia

1st Stages 5, 7 & 12
Held after Stages 7–12

1st Stage 21 Tour de France
1st Stage 1 Tour of Britain
1st Stage 1 Tour de Luxembourg
1st Stage 3 Presidential Tour of Turkey
2nd Rund um Köln
3rd Scheldeprijs
10th EuroEyes Cyclassics
2017
1st Trofeo Porreres-Felanitx–Ses Salines-Campos
1st Omloop Eurometropool
Volta ao Algarve

1st Points classification
1st Stage 4

Giro d'Italia

1st Stage 2
Held after Stage 2
Held after Stages 2–4

1st Stage 5 Paris–Nice
3rd Brussels Cycling Classic
3rd Primus Classic
3rd Münsterland Giro
4th Trofeo Playa de Palma
4th Omloop van het Houtland
4th Paris–Tours
5th EuroEyes Cyclassics
7th Paris–Roubaix
2018
Tour of Belgium

1st Points classification
1st Stages 1 & 2

Tour Down Under

1st Stages 1 & 6

Tour of Britain

1st Stages 1 & 4

2nd Overall Four Days of Dunkirk

1st Stages 2 & 5

4th Road race, National Road Championships
4th Münsterland Giro
8th London–Surrey Classic
2019
2nd Grote Prijs Stad Zottegem
3rd Overall La Tropicale Amissa Bongo

1st Stage 6

5th Trofeo Palma
8th Kuurne–Brussels–Kuurne
2021
1st Trofeo Alcúdia – Port d'Alcúdia
1st Stage 4 Vuelta a Andalucía
10th Münsterland Giro

=== Grand Tour general classification results timeline ===
	2006	2007	2008	2009	2010	2011	2012	2013	2014	2015	2016	2017	2018	2019	2020	2021
Giro d'Italia	—	—	133	—	DNS–19	—	—	—	—	DNS–14	DNS–13	DNS–14	—	—	—	—
Stages won	—	—	1	—	1	—	—	—	—	1	3	1	—	—	—	—
Points classification	—	—	32	—	—	—	—	—	—	—	—	—	—	—	—	—
Tour de France	—	—	—	—	—	155	123	129	149	134	133	149	DNF–12	144	DNF–18	125
Stages won	—	—	—	—	—	1	3	1	1	4	1	0	0	0	0	0
Points classification	—	—	—	—	—	7	2	3	7	2	4	2	—	41	—	15
Vuelta a España	DNF–9	125	—	107	—	—	—	—	—	—	—	—	—	—	—	—
Stages won	0	0	—	4	—	—	—	—	—	—	—	—	—	—	—	—
Points classification	—	12	—	1	—	—	—	—	—	—	—	—	—	—	—	—

Legend
1	Winner
2–3	Top three-finish
4–10	Top ten-finish
11–	Other finish
DNE	Did not enter
DNF-x	Did not finish (retired on stage x)
DNS-x	Did not start (not started on stage x)
HD	Finished outside time limit (occurred on stage x)
DSQ	Disqualified
N/A	Race/classification not held
NR	Not ranked in this classification
