= Tyler Farrar =

American former road racing cyclist

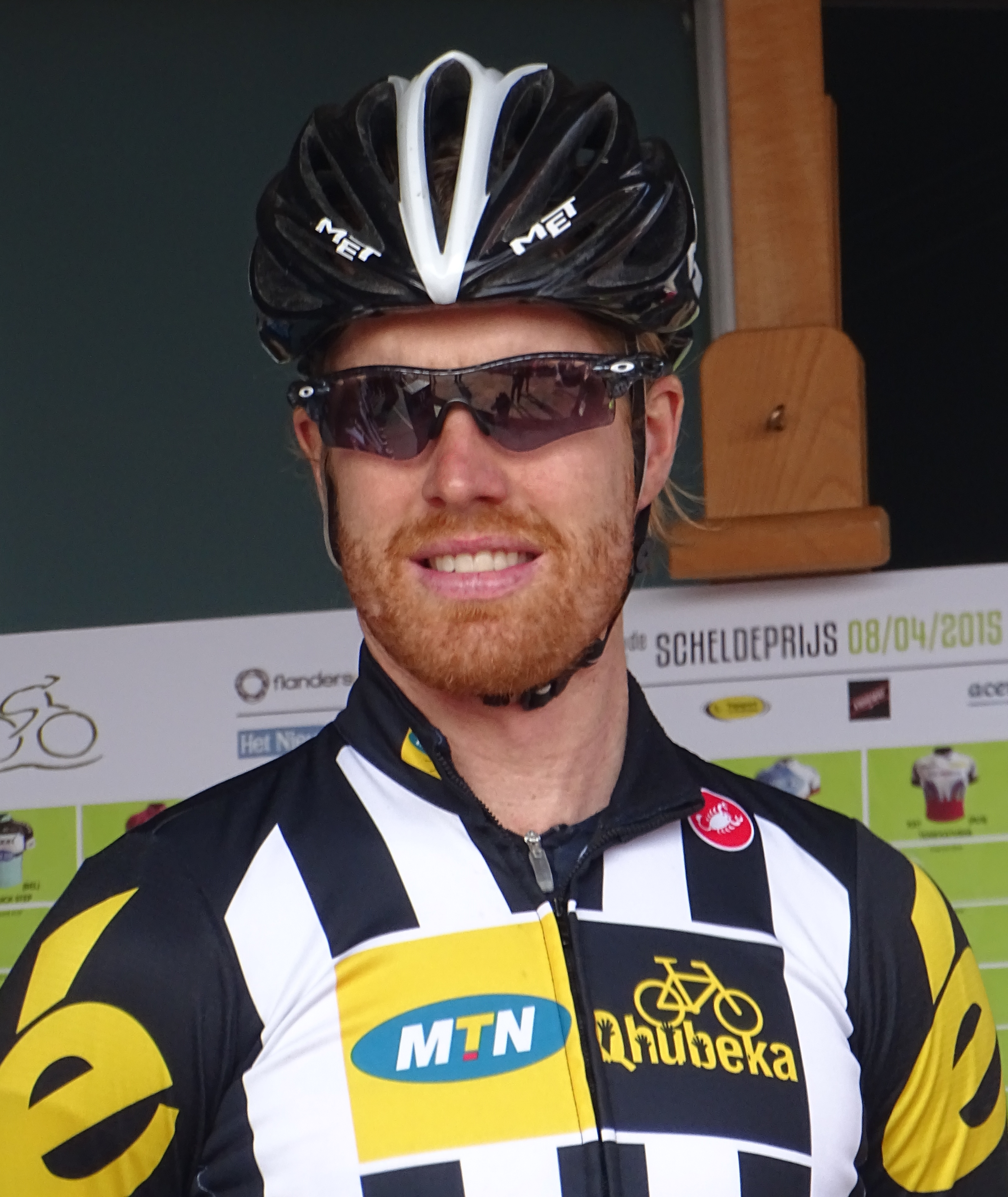
- Farrar at the 2015 Scheldeprijs

Personal information
- Full name: Tyler Farrar
- Born: June 2, 1984 (age 42) Wenatchee, Washington, United States
- Height: 1.83 m (6 ft 0 in)
- Weight: 74 kg (163 lb)

Cycling career
- Sport: Cycling
- Current team: Retired
- Discipline: Road
- Role: Rider
- Rider type: Sprinter; Road Captain

Professional teams
- 2003: Jelly Belly–Carlsbad Clothing Company
- 2004–2005: Health Net–Maxxis
- 2006–2007: Cofidis
- 2008–2014: Slipstream–Chipotle
- 2015–2017: MTN–Qhubeka

Major wins
- Grand Tours Tour de France 1 individual stage (2011) 1 TTT stage (2011) Giro d'Italia 2 individual stages (2010) 1 TTT stage (2012) Vuelta a España 3 individual stages (2009, 2010) One-day races and Classics Vattenfall Cyclassics (2009, 2010) Scheldeprijs (2010)

Tyler Farrar (born June 2, 1984) is an American former road racing cyclist, who rode professionally between 2003 and 2017 for the Jelly Belly–Carlsbad Clothing Company, Health Net–Maxxis, Cofidis, Garmin–Sharp and Team Dimension Data squads.

Farrar's achievements include winning the 2009 Circuit Franco-Belge and the 2009 and 2010 Vattenfall Cyclassics. In Grand Tours, Farrar has won six individual stages, as well as assisting in two team time trial wins.

== Cycling career ==
Farrar started racing at 13, and rode for Jelly Belly–Carlsbad Clothing Company in 2003, Health Net–Maxxis in 2004, and Cofidis in 2006 and 2007. In April 2006, he crashed near the finish of the Circuit de la Sarthe, which resulted in a broken collarbone, causing him to miss most of the season. For the 2008 season, he transferred to Slipstream–Chipotle.

He has won stages in the Giro d'Italia, Vuelta a España, Tour de France, Three Days of De Panne, and the USA Pro Cycling Challenge. He wore the yellow jersey on stage three of the 2008 Tour of California after winning intermediate sprint points during stage two.

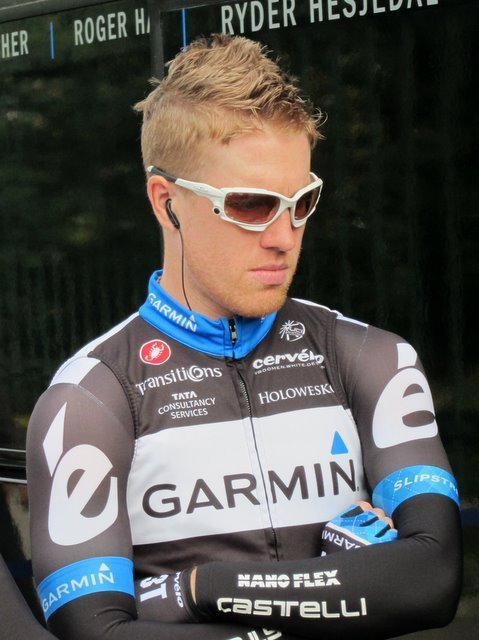
Farrar at the 2011 Gent–Wevelgem

Until the end of his career in 2017, Farrar lived in the Belgian city of Ghent, where he was made an honorary citizen in 2012. He was fluent in Dutch and was popular in Flanders.

In May 2011, Farrar withdrew from the Giro d'Italia as a mark of respect for his friend and training partner Wouter Weylandt, who was killed in an accident during the race. This tragedy occurred on stage 3 and on stage 4 the teams agreed not to race at all as they completed the entire stage at a steady pace with each team taking ten kilometers at the front with no attacks being made and the peloton staying together the entire time. Three kilometres from the finish Weylandt's eight teammates on Team Leopard-Trek came to the front and were also joined by Farrar, even though he was riding for Garmin-Cervelo. The nine riders rode together side by side as the rest of the peloton stayed back and as they approached the finish they did so arm in arm for the final fifty or so meters, all crossing the line together. The entire Leopard-Trek team and Farrar bowed out of the race following this tribute to their fallen teammate.

On July 4, 2011, Farrar won his first Tour de France stage, Stage 3 from Olonne-sur-Mer to Redon, becoming the first American to win a stage of the Tour on the Fourth of July. It would be ten years before another American would win a Tour de France stage.

Farrar crashed four times in the 2012 Tour de France, including a sprint-finish crash, after which he stormed the Argos–Shimano team bus to confront Tom Veelers, whom he blamed for the incident. He later took his first two wins of the season at the 2012 USA Pro Cycling Challenge. In the opening stage of that race, Farrar arrived in Telluride with a field of 57 riders and won a reduced bunch sprint at the finish. Afterwards, he stated that he was surprised to have survived the mountainous terrain to be able to contend for the sprint. Farrar won again in the fifth stage of the race, dedicating the win to his former Madison partner Mike Creed, who had been raising money for the victims of the Waldo Canyon fires. Due to his two wins he consolidated enough points to win the green jersey. Later in the season, Farrar crashed heavily during the first stage of the Tour of Britain, reportedly suffering a concussion. In October, Farrar was given clearance to train by the team doctor, Prentice Steffen, who stated: "The health of the athlete is always our top priority."

Farrar has a reputation for causing or being involved in crashes. Alessandro Petacchi noted that Farrar had crashed 18 times in the 2013–2014 seasons, commenting "There is probably a reason for this". Farrar denies using reckless or uncoordinated tactics, and ascribed most of his numerous crashes to "realities of modern cycling".

After seven years with Slipstream–Chipotle, Farrar signed with MTN–Qhubeka for the 2015 and 2016 seasons and again for the 2017 season. After riding in the 2017 Grand Prix Cycliste de Montréal, Farrar announced his retirement from competition.

When Farrar took the stage victory in the 2011 Tour de France it gave him a stage win in all three grand tours. Sepp Kuss is the only other American to have accomplished this.

== Post-cycling ==
After retiring from cycle racing, Farrar became a firefighter in Kirkland, Washington, as part of the City of Kirkland Fire Department.

== Major results ==
2001
10th Time trial, UCI Junior Road World Championships
2002
1st Overall Tour de l'Abitibi

1st Stage 4

2003
9th Ronde van Vlaanderen U23
2004
1st Time trial, National Under-23 Road Championships
1st Stage 7 Tour de l'Avenir
2nd Criterium, National Road Championships
9th Paris–Tours Espoirs
10th La Côte Picarde
2005 (1 pro win)
1st Criterium, National Road Championships
1st Stage 4 Ronde de l'Isard
1st Stage 2 Tour de l'Avenir
2nd Road race, National Under-23 Road Championships
2nd Grand Prix de Waregem
5th Wachovia Classic
10th Time trial, UCI Under-23 Road World Championships
2006
5th Overall Tour du Poitou-Charentes
5th Grand Prix de Rennes
2007 (1)
GP CTT Correios de Portugal

1st Points classification
1st Stage 2

9th Kuurne–Brussels–Kuurne
2008 (1)
1st Overall Tour of the Bahamas

1st Points classification
1st Stages 2 & 3

1st Stage 1 Tour du Poitou-Charentes
1st Stage 4 (TTT) Tour de Georgia
4th Univest Grand Prix
5th Paris–Tours
6th Philadelphia International Championship
8th Lehigh Valley Classic
9th Grand Prix d'Isbergues
2009 (11)
1st Overall Tour de Wallonie-Picarde

1st Points classification
1st Stages 1 & 2

1st Overall Delta Tour Zeeland

1st Points classification
1st Prologue

1st Vattenfall Cyclassics
Eneco Tour

1st Stages 1, 2 & 4

1st Stage 3 Tirreno–Adriatico
1st Stage 11 Vuelta a España
2010 (8)
1st Overall Delta Tour Zeeland

1st Points classification

1st Vattenfall Cyclassics
1st Scheldeprijs
Giro d'Italia

1st Stages 2 & 10

Vuelta a España

1st Stages 5 & 21

1st Stage 3 Three Days of De Panne
2nd GP Ouest–France
3rd Omloop Het Nieuwsblad
5th Tour of Flanders
6th Coppa Bernocchi
9th Gent–Wevelgem
10th UCI World Ranking
2011 (4)
1st Trofeo Palma de Mallorca
1st Trofeo Cala Millor
Tour de France

1st Stages 2 (TTT) & 3

1st Stage 2 Tirreno–Adriatico
1st Stage 2 Ster ZLM Toer
3rd Dwars door Vlaanderen
3rd Gent–Wevelgem
4th Kuurne–Brussels–Kuurne
10th Road race, UCI Road World Championships
2012 (2)
USA Pro Cycling Challenge

1st Points classification
1st Stages 1 & 5

1st Stage 4 (TTT) Giro d'Italia
1st Stage 2 (TTT) Tour of Utah
2nd Overall Tour of Qatar

1st Stage 2 (TTT)

2nd Scheldeprijs
5th Overall Driedaagse van West-Vlaanderen
2013 (2)
1st Stage 4 Tour of California
2nd Trofeo Palma de Mallorca
2nd Trofeo Campos–Santanyí–Ses Salines
3rd Overall Tour de l'Eurométropole

1st Stage 3

4th Paris–Tours
6th Scheldeprijs
2014 (1)
Tour of Beijing

1st Points classification
1st Stage 3

2nd Dwars door Vlaanderen
2nd Scheldeprijs
4th Vattenfall Cyclassics
8th Overall Tour de l'Eurométropole
8th E3 Harelbeke
10th Overall Ster ZLM Toer

1st Points classification

2015
9th Scheldeprijs

=== Grand Tour general classification results timeline ===
Grand Tour	2009	2010	2011	2012	2013	2014	2015	2016
Giro d'Italia	DNF	DNF	DNF	DNF	—	147	—	—
Tour de France	148	DNF	158	151	—	—	154	—
Vuelta a España	DNF	141	DNF	—	124	—	—	155

=== Classics results timeline ===
Monument	2006	2007	2008	2009	2010	2011	2012	2013	2014	2015	2016	2017
Milan–San Remo	—	—	DNF	DNF	42	46	109	94	—	—	—	—
Tour of Flanders	—	DNF	53	—	5	13	99	46	47	58	117	121
Paris–Roubaix	—	—	57	—	OTL	28	29	58	67	54	DNF	OTL
Liège–Bastogne–Liège	Did not contest during career											
Giro di Lombardia	Did not contest during career											
Classic	2006	2007	2008	2009	2010	2011	2012	2013	2014	2015	2016	2017
Omloop Het Nieuwsblad	—	DNF	127	99	3	—	—	—	70	51	—	—
Kuurne–Brussels–Kuurne	—	9	77	102	DNF	4	18	—	81	66	—	—
E3 Saxo Bank Classic	DNF	—	—	—	—	—	—	44	8	64	82	65
Gent–Wevelgem	—	DNF	—	—	9	3	55	DNF	131	DNF	80	96
Dwars door Vlaanderen	DNF	114	—	—	—	3	50	—	2	52	—	—
Scheldeprijs	—	—	—	—	1	DNF	2	6	2	9	60	117
Hamburg Cyclassics	DNF	73	—	1	1	—	—	—	4	55	—	146
GP Ouest-France	—	111	—	—	2	—	—	—	96	—	—	—
Paris–Tours	63	—	5	46	—	—	—	4	—	—	—	—

Legend
—	Did not compete
DNF	Did not finish

== Endorsements ==
Farrar appears in the opening titles of ITV London morning weather forecasts. The forecasts are sponsored by Transitions Lenses who also sponsor Farrar's cycling team. In 2010, Transition Lenses featured Farrar in its online advertisements.
