= Giacomo Nizzolo =

Italian racing cyclist

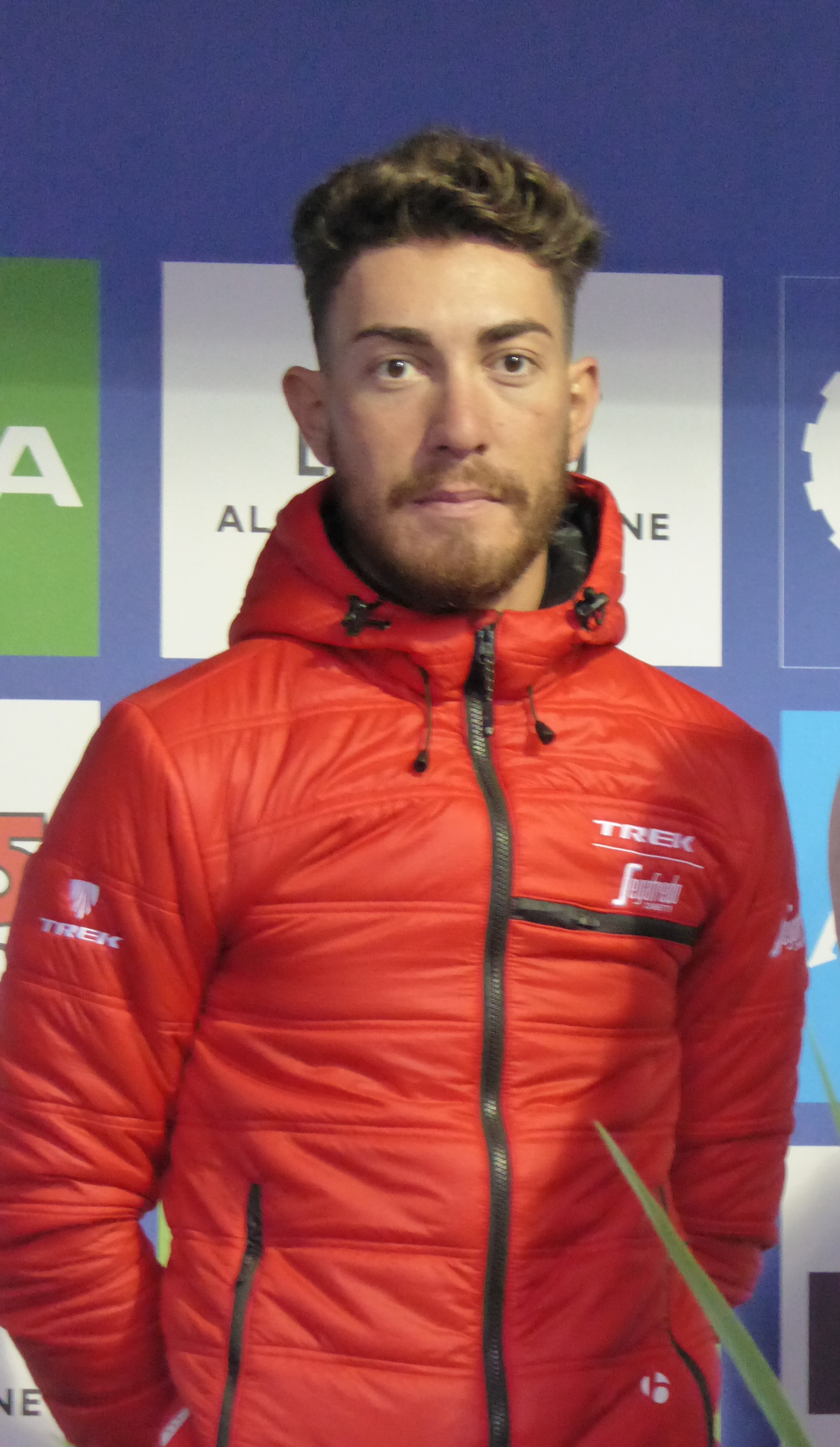
- Nizzolo at the 2016 Tour of Britain.

Personal information
- Full name: Giacomo Nizzolo
- Nickname: Gizz
- Born: 30 January 1989 (age 37) Milan, Italy
- Height: 1.84 m (6 ft 0 in)
- Weight: 72 kg (159 lb)

Cycling career
- Sport: Cycling
- Current team: Pinarello–Q36.5 Pro Cycling Team
- Discipline: Road
- Role: Rider
- Rider type: Sprinter

Professional teams
- 2011–2018: Leopard Trek
- 2019–2021: Team Dimension Data
- 2022–2023: Israel–Premier Tech
- 2024–: Q36.5 Pro Cycling Team

Major wins
- Grand Tours Giro d'Italia Points classification (2015, 2016) 1 individual stage (2021) Stage races Tour de Wallonie (2012) Single-day races and Classics European Road Race Championships (2020) National Road Race Championships (2016, 2020) Grand Prix of Aargau Canton (2016) Gran Piemonte (2016) Clásica de Almería (2021) Tro-Bro Léon (2023)
Medal record
Representing Italy
Men's road bicycle racing
European Championships
Gold medal – first place	2020 Plouay	Road race

Giacomo Nizzolo (born 30 January 1989) is an Italian racing cyclist, who currently rides for UCI ProTeam Pinarello–Q36.5 Pro Cycling Team.

== Career ==
=== Leopard Trek (2011–18) ===
Nizzolo took his first win at UCI World Tour level in August 2012, on stage 5 of the Eneco Tour. He launched his sprint 300 m (980 ft) away from the finish, and was almost passed on the line by Jürgen Roelandts (Lotto–Belisol), who thought he had won, but the photo-finish would prove that Nizzolo was the victor.

He won the Points classification in the Giro d'Italia two years in a row in 2015 and 2016 without a stage win.

In 2018 Nizzolo was named as a rider in the Vuelta a España, he finished on the podium on 3 different stages.

=== Dimension Data (2019–21) ===
Nizzolo signed a two-year contract with Team Dimension Data on 21 September 2018; this marked the first time Nizzolo had changed teams in his professional career. In July 2019, he was named in the startlist for the Tour de France. In 2020, Nizzolo won both the Italian National Road Race Championships and the road race at the UEC European Road Championships, in a sprint finish. He extended his contract by a further year, for the 2021 season. He took his first Grand Tour stage victory – after eleven previous second-place Giro d'Italia stage finishes – by winning the thirteenth stage of the 2021 Giro d'Italia, beating Edoardo Affini to the line in Verona.

=== Israel Start-Up Nation ===
With Team Qhubeka NextHash encountering financial issues, Nizzolo signed a contract with the Israel–Premier Tech team for the 2022 season.

== Major results ==
=== Road ===
2007
2nd Gran Premio dell'Arno
2010
9th Gran Premio della Liberazione
2011 (1 pro win)
1st Stage 5 Bayern Rundfahrt
2nd ProRace Berlin
3rd Rund um Köln
5th GP Ouest–France
5th Trofeo Magaluf-Palmanova
9th Trofeo Cala Millor
2012 (4)
1st Overall Tour de Wallonie

1st ] Young rider classification
1st Stage 3

Eneco Tour

1st Points classification
1st Stage 5

1st Stage 3 Tour du Poitou-Charentes
3rd Vattenfall Cyclassics
5th Overall Ster ZLM Toer
5th Le Samyn
7th GP Ouest–France
9th Scheldeprijs
2013 (2)
Tour de Luxembourg

1st Points classification
1st Stages 2 & 3

1st Points classification, Volta ao Algarve
2nd GP Ouest–France
2014 (2)
1st Stage 3 Tour de San Luis
1st Stage 2 Tour de Wallonie
2nd Vattenfall Cyclassics
3rd Paris–Bourges
7th Brussels Cycling Classic
9th GP Ouest–France
2015 (1)
1st Points classification, Giro d'Italia
1st Gran Premio Nobili Rubinetterie
3rd Vattenfall Cyclassics
3rd Tre Valli Varesine
3rd Paris–Bourges
4th Coppa Ugo Agostoni
5th Road race, European Games
6th Grand Prix of Aargau Canton
7th Coppa Bernocchi
10th Brussels Cycling Classic
2016 (7)
1st Road race, National Championships
1st Points classification, Giro d'Italia
1st Gran Piemonte
1st Grand Prix of Aargau Canton
1st Coppa Bernocchi
Tour of Croatia

1st Points classification
1st Stages 1 & 3

1st Stage 1 Abu Dhabi Tour
2nd Overall Dubai Tour
3rd EuroEyes Cyclassics
5th Road race, UCI World Championships
6th Dwars door Vlaanderen
8th Bretagne Classic
2018 (1)
1st Stage 7 Vuelta a San Juan
3rd London–Surrey Classic
6th EuroEyes Cyclassics
9th Grand Prix Pino Cerami
2019 (3)
1st Stage 1 Vuelta a Burgos
1st Stage 5 Tour of Slovenia
1st Stage 6 Tour of Oman
3rd EuroEyes Cyclassics
6th London–Surrey Classic
8th Primus Classic
8th Kampioenschap van Vlaanderen
9th Three Days of Bruges–De Panne
2020 (4)
1st Road race, UEC European Championships
1st Road race, National Championships
1st Stage 2 Paris–Nice
1st Stage 5 Tour Down Under
2nd Kuurne–Brussels–Kuurne
2nd Race Torquay
2nd Circuito de Getxo
5th Milan–San Remo
6th Le Samyn
2021 (3)
1st Clásica de Almería
1st Circuito de Getxo
Giro d'Italia

1st Stage 13
Held after Stages 5–6

2nd Gent–Wevelgem
2nd Gran Piemonte
4th Classic Brugge–De Panne
4th Grand Prix of Aargau Canton
8th Scheldeprijs
9th Primus Classic
10th Bretagne Classic
10th Grand Prix d'Isbergues
2022 (1)
Vuelta a Castilla y León

1st Points classification
1st Stage 1

2nd Heistse Pijl
3rd Clásica de Almería
3rd Trofeo Alcúdia–Port d'Alcúdia
5th Kuurne–Brussels–Kuurne
5th Egmont Cycling Race
6th Elfstedenronde
7th Trofeo Playa de Palma
9th Ronde van Limburg
2023 (1)
1st Tro-Bro Léon
5th Clásica de Almería
7th Elfstedenronde
8th Antwerp Port Epic
10th Scheldeprijs
10th Circuit de Wallonie
10th Polynormande
10th Tour of Leuven
10th Kampioenschap van Vlaanderen
2024 (1)
1st Stage 4 Sibiu Cycling Tour
7th Vuelta a Castilla y León
2025
3rd Grand Prix Criquielion
8th Grote Prijs Jean-Pierre Monseré

==== Grand Tour general classification results timeline ====
Grand Tour	2012	2013	2014	2015	2016	2017	2018	2019	2020	2021	2022
Giro d'Italia	130	130	141	137	110	DNF	—	DNF	—	DNF	DNF
Tour de France	—	—	—	—	—	—	—	DNF	DNF	—	—
Vuelta a España	—	—	—	—	—	—	140	—	—	—	—

==== Classic results timeline ====
Monument	2011	2012	2013	2014	2015	2016	2017	2018	2019	2020	2021	2022	2023	2024
Milan–San Remo	—	—	DNF	—	84	42	—	—	20	5	18	18	—	—
Tour of Flanders	DNF	—	—	—	—	—	—	—	—	—	DNF	—	—	—
Paris–Roubaix	DNF	DNF	—	—	—	—	—	—	—	NH	DNF	—	—	—
Liège–Bastogne–Liège	Has not contested during his career													
Giro di Lombardia	—	—	—	—	DNF	—	—	—	—	—	—	—	—	—
Classic	2011	2012	2013	2014	2015	2016	2017	2018	2019	2020	2021	2022	2023	2024
Kuurne–Brussels–Kuurne	—	—	NH	—	—	DNF	—	22	DNF	2	—	5	41	—
Gent–Wevelgem	—	DNF	DNF	—	DNF	11	—	—	DNF	—	2	—	—	—
Dwars door Vlaanderen	—	—	DNF	—	DNF	6	—	—	—	NH	15	—	—	—
Scheldeprijs	18	9	—	—	—	—	—	—	—	—	8	—	10	—
Hamburg Cyclassics	DNF	3	13	2	3	3	—	6	3	Not held		65	29	73
Bretagne Classic	5	7	2	9	31	8	—	—	DNF	—	10	55	—	—

==== Major championships timeline ====
Event		2014	2015	2016	2017	2018	2019	2020	2021	2022	2023	2024
World Championships	Road race	—	18	5	—	—	—	—	15	—	—	—
European Championships	Road race	DNE		—	—	—	—	1	—	—	—	—
National Championships	Road race	DNF	DNF	1	DNF	36	DNF	1	DNF	DNF	—	DNF

Legend
—	Did not compete
DNE	Race did not exist
DNF	Did not finish
IP	In progress
NH	Not held

=== Track ===
2007
2nd Keirin, National Junior Championships
3rd Team pursuit, UCI World Junior Championships
