= 2010 Dwars door Vlaanderen =

Race details
- Dates: 24 March 2010
- Stages: 1
- Distance: 200 km (124.3 mi)
- Winning time: 4h 49' 37"

Results
	Winner	Matti Breschel (DEN)
	Second	Björn Leukemans (BEL)
	Third	Niki Terpstra (NED)

The 2010 Dwars door Vlaanderen was the 65th edition of the Dwars door Vlaanderen cycle race and was held on 24 March 2010. The race started in Roeselare and finished in Waregem. The race was won by Matti Breschel.

== General classification ==
Final general classification

Rank	Rider	Time
1	Matti Breschel (DEN)	4h 49' 37"
2	Björn Leukemans (BEL)	+ 7"
3	Niki Terpstra (NED)	+ 7"
4	Steve Chainel (FRA)	+ 7"
5	Mathew Hayman (AUS)	+ 7"
6	Luca Paolini (ITA)	+ 7"
7	Wouter Mol (NED)	+ 7"
8	Tom Veelers (NED)	+ 7"
9	Stijn Vandenbergh (BEL)	+ 7"
10	William Bonnet (FRA)	+ 7"
