= 2009 Vattenfall Cyclassics =

Vattenfall Cyclassics
2009 UCI World Ranking, race 20 of 24

Race details
- Dates: August 16, 2009
- Stages: 1
- Distance: 225 km (139.8 mi)
- Winning time: 5h 30' 38"

Results
	Winner	Tyler Farrar (USA)	(Garmin–Slipstream)
	Second	Matti Breschel (DEN)	(Team Saxo Bank)
	Third	Gerald Ciolek (GER)	(Team Milram)

The 2009 Vattenfall Cyclassics is a one-day road race, which is part of the 2009 UCI ProTour, took place on 16 August 2009. The race covered a total of 225 kilometres (140 mi) and took place in Hamburg, Germany.

== Results ==
Rank	Cyclist	Team	Time	UCI World Ranking Points
1	Tyler Farrar (USA)	Garmin–Slipstream	5h 30' 38"	80
2	Matti Breschel (DEN)	Team Saxo Bank	s.t.	60
3	Gerald Ciolek (GER)	Team Milram	s.t.	50
4	Allan Davis (AUS)	Quick-Step	s.t.	40
5	Koldo Fernández (ESP)	Euskaltel–Euskadi	s.t.	30
6	Davide Viganò (ITA)	Fuji–Servetto	s.t.	22
7	Daniele Bennati (ITA)	Liquigas–Doimo	s.t.	14
8	Fabio Sabatini (ITA)	Liquigas–Doimo	s.t.	10
9	Marco Bandiera (ITA)	Lampre–NGC	s.t.	6
10	Jacopo Guarnieri (ITA)	Liquigas–Doimo	s.t.	2
