= 2012 Tour de Wallonie =

Race details
- Dates: 21–25 July 2012
- Stages: 5
- Distance: 937.3 km (582.4 mi)
- Winning time: 23h 28' 43"

Results
| | Winner | Giacomo Nizzolo (ITA) |
| | Second | Gianni Meersman (BEL) |
| | Third | Pim Ligthart (NED) |

The 2012 Tour de Wallonie was the 39th edition of the Tour de Wallonie cycle race and was held on 21–25 July 2012. The race started in Tournai and finished in Perwez. The race was won by Giacomo Nizzolo.

== General classification ==
Final general classification

| Rank | Rider | Time |
|---|---|---|
| 1 | Giacomo Nizzolo (ITA) | 23h 28' 43" |
| 2 | Gianni Meersman (BEL) | + 1" |
| 3 | Pim Ligthart (NED) | + 2" |
| 4 | Mikhail Ignatiev (RUS) | + 3" |
| 5 | Lloyd Mondory (FRA) | + 11" |
| 6 | Davy Commeyne (BEL) | + 13" |
| 7 | Pieter Jacobs (BEL) | + 13" |
| 8 | Kevyn Ista (BEL) | + 14" |
| 9 | Jelle Wallays (BEL) | + 14" |
| 10 | Rémi Pauriol (FRA) | + 14" |
