= 2011 Gent–Wevelgem =

2011 UCI World Tour, race 6 of 27
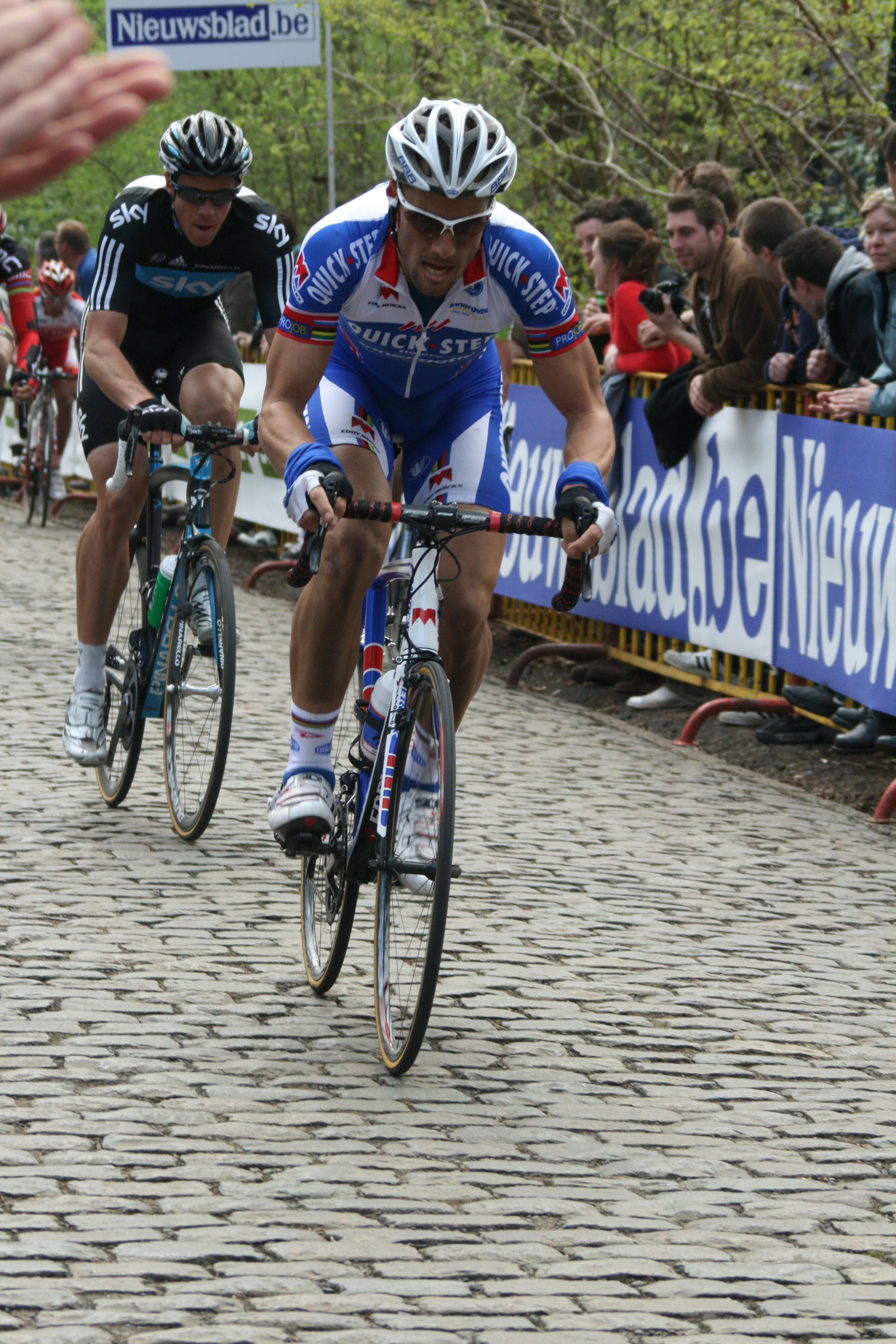
- Tom Boonen riding at Kemmelberg.

Race details
- Dates: 27 March 2011
- Stages: 1
- Distance: 219 km (136 mi)

Results
| | Winner | Tom Boonen (BEL) | (Quick-Step) |
| | Second | Daniele Bennati (ITA) | (Leopard Trek) |
| | Third | Tyler Farrar (USA) | (Garmin–Cervélo) |

The 2011 Gent–Wevelgem was the 73rd edition of the Belgian Gent–Wevelgem cycling race, held on 27 March 2011 between Deinze and Wevelgem. Quick-Step's Tom Boonen won the race in a sprint finish ahead of Leopard Trek rider Daniele Bennati and Tyler Farrar of Garmin–Cervélo.

== Teams ==
As this is a UCI World Tour event, the organisers are obliged to give a place to each of the 18 ProTour teams. They also invited 7 wild card teams, indicated with an asterisk below. Each of the 25 teams were permitted up to eight riders: 196 riders began the race.

- Ag2r–La Mondiale
- Astana
- BMC Racing Team
- Cofidis*
- Team Europcar*
- Euskaltel–Euskadi
- FDJ*
- Garmin–Cervélo
- HTC–Highroad
- Landbouwkrediet*
- Lampre–ISD
- Liquigas–Cannondale
- Leopard Trek
- Omega Pharma–Lotto
- Quick-Step
- Rabobank
- Skil–Shimano*
- Team Katusha
- Movistar Team
- Team RadioShack
- Saxo Bank–SunGard
- Team Sky
- Topsport Vlaanderen–Mercator*
- Vacansoleil–DCM
- Veranda's Willems–Accent*

== Results ==
| | Cyclist | Team | Time | UCI World Tour Points |
|---|---|---|---|---|
| 1 | Tom Boonen (BEL) | Quick-Step | 4h 35' 00" | 80 |
| 2 | Daniele Bennati (ITA) | Leopard Trek | s.t. | 60 |
| 3 | Tyler Farrar (USA) | Garmin–Cervélo | s.t. | 50 |
| 4 | André Greipel (GER) | Omega Pharma–Lotto | s.t. | 40 |
| 5 | Lloyd Mondory (FRA) | Ag2r–La Mondiale | s.t. | 30 |
| 6 | Mitchell Docker (AUS) | Skil–Shimano | s.t. | - |
| 7 | Bernhard Eisel (AUT) | HTC–Highroad | s.t. | 14 |
| 8 | Kristof Goddaert (BEL) | Ag2r–La Mondiale | s.t. | 10 |
| 9 | Lars Boom (NED) | Rabobank | s.t. | 6 |
| 10 | Baden Cooke (AUS) | Saxo Bank–SunGard | s.t. | 2 |
