= 2014 Vattenfall Cyclassics =

2014 UCI World Tour, race 23 of 29

Race details
- Dates: 24 August 2014
- Stages: 1
- Distance: 247 km (153.5 mi)
- Winning time: 5h 55' 24"

Results
| | Winner | Alexander Kristoff (NOR) | (Team Katusha) |
| | Second | Giacomo Nizzolo (ITA) | (Trek Factory Racing) |
| | Third | Simon Gerrans (AUS) | (Orica–GreenEDGE) |

The 2014 Vattenfall Cyclassics was the 19th edition of the Vattenfall Cyclassics, a single-day cycling race. It was held on 24 August 2014, over a distance of 247 km (153.5 mi), starting and finishing in Hamburg, Germany. It is the 23rd race of the 2014 UCI World Tour season. It was won in the sprint by Alexander Kristoff, ahead of Giacomo Nizzolo and Simon Gerrans.

== Teams ==
As the Vattenfall Cyclassics was a UCI World Tour event, all 18 UCI ProTeams were invited automatically and obligated to send a squad. One Professional Continental team – NetApp–Endura – was given a wildcard place into the race. The peloton was therefore made up of 19 team.

The 19 teams that competed in the race were:

- Ag2r–La Mondiale
- Astana
- Belkin Pro Cycling
- BMC Racing Team
- Cannondale
- Team Europcar
- FDJ.fr
- Giant–Shimano
- Garmin–Sharp
- Team Katusha
- Lampre–Merida
- Lotto–Belisol
- Movistar Team
- Omega Pharma–Quick-Step
- Orica–GreenEDGE
- NetApp–Endura †
- Tinkoff–Saxo
- Team Sky
- Trek Factory Racing

== Results ==
| | Cyclist | Team | Time | UCI World Tour Points |
|---|---|---|---|---|
| 1 | Alexander Kristoff (NOR) | Team Katusha | 5h 55' 24" | 80 |
| 2 | Giacomo Nizzolo (ITA) | Trek Factory Racing | + 0" | 60 |
| 3 | Simon Gerrans (AUS) | Orica–GreenEDGE | + 0" | 50 |
| 4 | Tyler Farrar (USA) | Garmin–Sharp | + 0" | 40 |
| 5 | Mark Cavendish (GBR) | Omega Pharma–Quick-Step | + 0" | 30 |
| 6 | Marcel Kittel (GER) | Giant–Shimano | + 0" | 22 |
| 7 | Davide Cimolai (ITA) | Lampre–Merida | + 0" | 14 |
| 8 | Juan José Lobato (ESP) | Movistar Team | + 0" | 10 |
| 9 | Silvan Dillier (SUI) | BMC Racing Team | + 0" | 6 |
| 10 | Raymond Kreder (NED) | Garmin–Sharp | + 0" | 2 |
