= 2016 EuroEyes Cyclassics =

2016 UCI World Tour

Race details
- Dates: 21 August 2016
- Stages: 1
- Distance: 217.7 km (135.3 mi)
- Winning time: 4h 54' 26"

Results
	Winner	Caleb Ewan (AUS)	(Orica–BikeExchange)
	Second	John Degenkolb (GER)	(Team Giant–Alpecin)
	Third	Giacomo Nizzolo (ITA)	(Trek–Segafredo)

The 2016 EuroEyes Cyclassics are the 21st edition of the EuroEyes Cyclassics road bicycle race, the first edition under the new name. The one-day-race took place on 21 August 2016 and was won by Caleb Ewan in the sprint, after Nacer Bouhanni was relegated for irregular sprinting.

== Route and background ==
The EuroEyes Cyclassics was the only UCI World Tour race held in Germany during the 2016 season.

== Teams ==
The 18 UCI World Tour teams are automatically entitled and obliged to start the race. The race organisation will still hand out a few wildcards to some UCI Professional Continental teams.

World Tour teams

- AG2R La Mondiale
- Astana
- BMC Racing Team
- Team Dimension Data
- Etixx–Quick-Step
- FDJ
- IAM Cycling
- Lampre–Merida
- Lotto–Soudal
- Movistar Team
- Team Giant–Alpecin
- Team Katusha
- LottoNL–Jumbo
- Team Sky
- Tinkoff
- Trek–Segafredo
- Cannondale–Drapac
- Orica–BikeExchange

== Race report ==
The race was started at 11:30 local time with last year's champion André Greipel defending his title. A leading group of six, later five and four riders escaped from the peloton during the race, facing partly wet road conditions due to some showers. The leading group initially consisted of Lukas Pöstlberger (BOA), Matteo Montaguti (Ag2R), Alessandro De Marchi (BMC), Kamil Gradek (VAT), Matej Mohorič (LAM) and Maxat Ayazbayev (AST). After 217 km, the group of four was caught just before finishing straight. Nacer Bouhanni (COF) was fastest in the final sprint, ahead of Caleb Ewan (OBE), John Degenkolb (TGA) and Giacomo Nizzolo (TFS). However, Nacer Bouhanni was relegated for irregularities in the sprint, and Caleb Ewan was declared the winner.

== Result ==
Final general classification

Rank	Rider	Team	Time
1	Caleb Ewan (AUS)	Orica–BikeExchange	4h 54' 26"
2	John Degenkolb (GER)	Team Giant–Alpecin	s.t.
3	Giacomo Nizzolo (ITA)	Trek–Segafredo	s.t.
4	Danny van Poppel (NED)	Team Sky	s.t.
5	Alexander Kristoff (NOR)	Team Katusha	s.t.
6	Dylan Groenewegen (NED)	LottoNL–Jumbo	s.t.
7	Mark Renshaw (AUS)	Team Dimension Data	s.t.
8	Sondre Holst Enger (NOR)	IAM Cycling	s.t.
9	Matteo Trentin (ITA)	Etixx–Quick-Step	s.t.
10	André Greipel (GER)	Lotto–Soudal	s.t.
