= 2019 EuroEyes Cyclassics =

Cycling race

2019 UCI World Tour, race 33 of 38

Race details
- Dates: 25 August 2019
- Stages: 1
- Distance: 224 km (139.2 mi)
- Winning time: 4h 47' 27"

Results
	Winner	Elia Viviani (ITA)	(Deceuninck–Quick-Step)
	Second	Caleb Ewan (AUS)	(Lotto–Soudal)
	Third	Giacomo Nizzolo (ITA)	(Team Dimension Data)

The 2019 EuroEyes Cyclassics was a road cycling one-day race that took place on 25 August 2019 in Germany. It was the 24th edition of EuroEyes Cyclassics and the 33rd event of the 2019 UCI World Tour. It was won for the third year in a row by Elia Viviani in the sprint.

== Teams ==
Twenty teams of up to seven riders will be participating in the race:

UCI WorldTeams

- AG2R La Mondiale
- Astana
- Bahrain–Merida
- Bora–Hansgrohe
- CCC Team
- Deceuninck–Quick-Step
- EF Education First
- Groupama–FDJ
- Lotto–Soudal
- Mitchelton–Scott
- Movistar Team
- Team Dimension Data
- Team Ineos
- Team Jumbo–Visma
- Team Katusha–Alpecin
- Team Sunweb
- Trek–Segafredo
- UAE Team Emirates

UCI Professional Continental teams

- Arkéa–Samsic
- Gazprom–RusVelo

== Result ==
Result
Rank	Rider	Team	Time
1	Elia Viviani (ITA)	Deceuninck–Quick-Step	4h 47' 27"
2	Caleb Ewan (AUS)	Lotto–Soudal	+ 0"
3	Giacomo Nizzolo (ITA)	Team Dimension Data	+ 0"
4	Alexander Kristoff (NOR)	UAE Team Emirates	+ 0"
5	Mike Teunissen (NED)	Team Jumbo–Visma	+ 0"
6	Peter Sagan (SVK)	Bora–Hansgrohe	+ 0"
7	Matteo Trentin (ITA)	Mitchelton–Scott	+ 0"
8	Arnaud Démare (FRA)	Groupama–FDJ	+ 0"
9	Sonny Colbrelli (ITA)	Bahrain–Merida	+ 0"
10	Oliver Naesen (BEL)	AG2R La Mondiale	+ 0"
