= Hamburg Cyclassics =

German one-day road cycling race

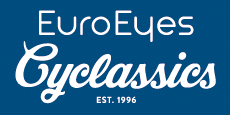
- EuroEyes sponsored the race between 2016 and 2020

Race details
- Date: Mid to late August
- Region: Hamburg, Germany
- Discipline: Road
- Competition: UCI World Tour
- Type: Single-day race
- Web site: www.cyclassics-hamburg.de

History
- First edition: 1996
- Editions: 29 (as of 2026)
- First winner: Rossano Brasi (ITA)
- Most wins: Elia Viviani (ITA) (3 wins)
- Most recent: Paul Magnier (FRA)

The Hamburg Cyclassics (known since 2025 as the ADAC Cyclassics for sponsorship purposes) is an annual one-day professional and amateur cycling race in and around Hamburg, Germany. Although the route varies, its distance is always around 250 km. The course's most significant difficulty is Waseberg hill in Blankenese, which is addressed three times in the race finale.

Until 2016 it was Germany's only event on the UCI World Tour calendar, before the inclusion of Eschborn–Frankfurt – Rund um den Finanzplatz in 2017. The race is organized by IRONMAN Unlimited Events Germany GmbH, which also organizes the annual Velothon Berlin.

An important part of the Cyclassics is the Jedermannrennen ("Everyman's race"), an amateur/cyclosportif event held on the same day and on the same roads as the professional race. Bike fanatics can participate in amateur tour races over 55 km, 100 km and 155 km. The number of participants is limited to 22.000 amateurs and tickets must be reserved months in advance.

== History ==
=== HEW Cyclassics ===
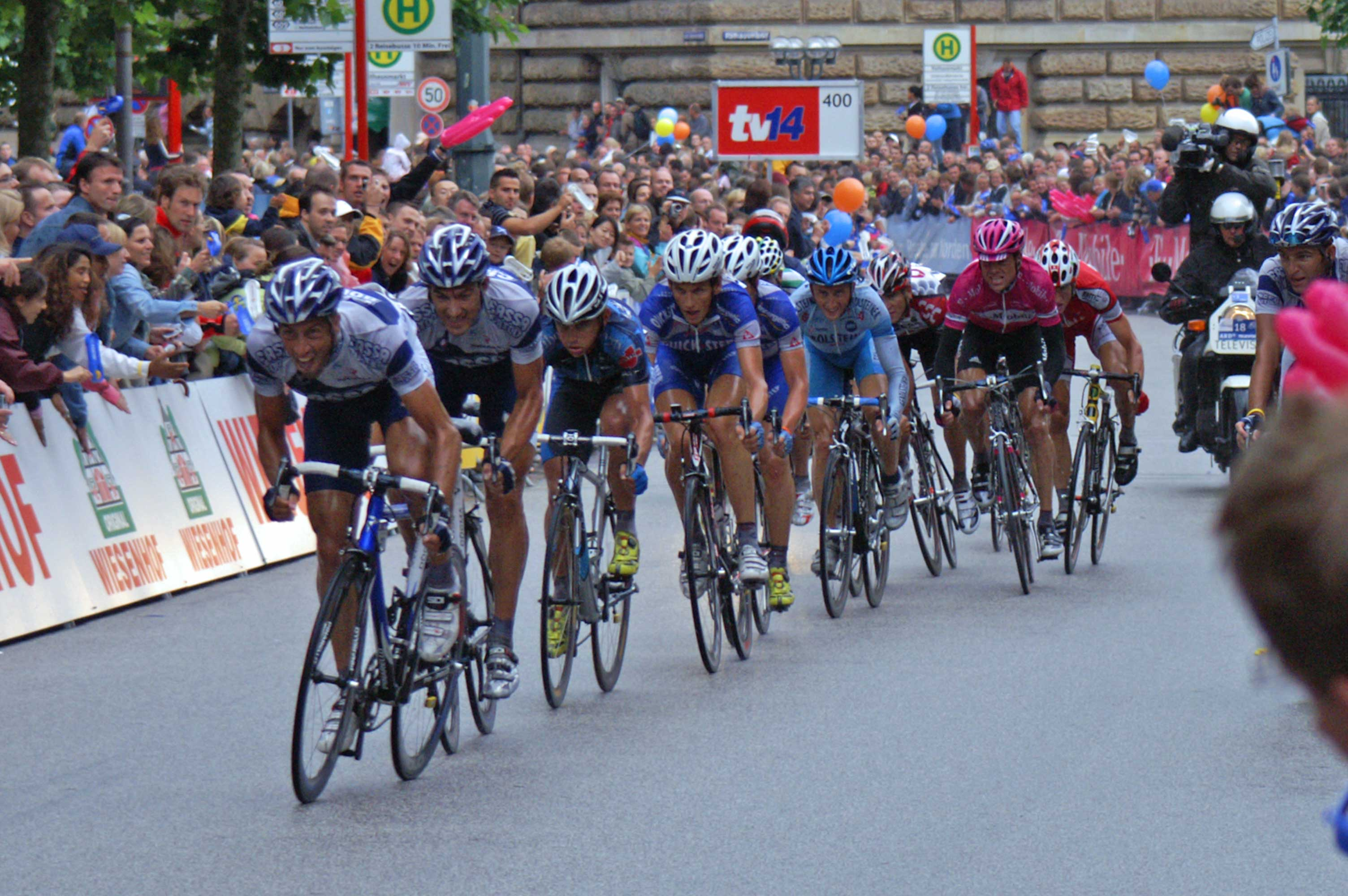
Finishing straight of the tenth edition in 2005, won by Italian Filippo Pozzato.

The event was created in 1996 as a 1.5 race, the lowest classification of professional races. The first edition was its shortest ever, totaling just 160 km, won by Italian Rossano Brasi. HEW, Hamburg's Electricity Works, served as the race's title sponsor. In 1997 Jan Ullrich won the second edition amid hordes of fans, two weeks after winning the Tour de France, and the race gained prestige fast.

With cycling's fast-growing popularity in Germany in the 1990s, the race became part of the UCI Road World Cup in 1998, cycling's ten highest-classified one-day races. It replaced the Wincanton Classic, Britain's only cycling classic, as the seventh leg of the World Cup. Dutchman Léon van Bon outsprinted Michele Bartoli to win the third edition; the distance was increased to 253 km.

Erik Zabel was the second German winner of the HEW Cyclassics in 2001. In 2002, Belgian classics specialist Johan Museeuw won his eleventh and last World Cup race, leading out the sprint from a group of ten.

=== Vattenfall Cyclassics ===
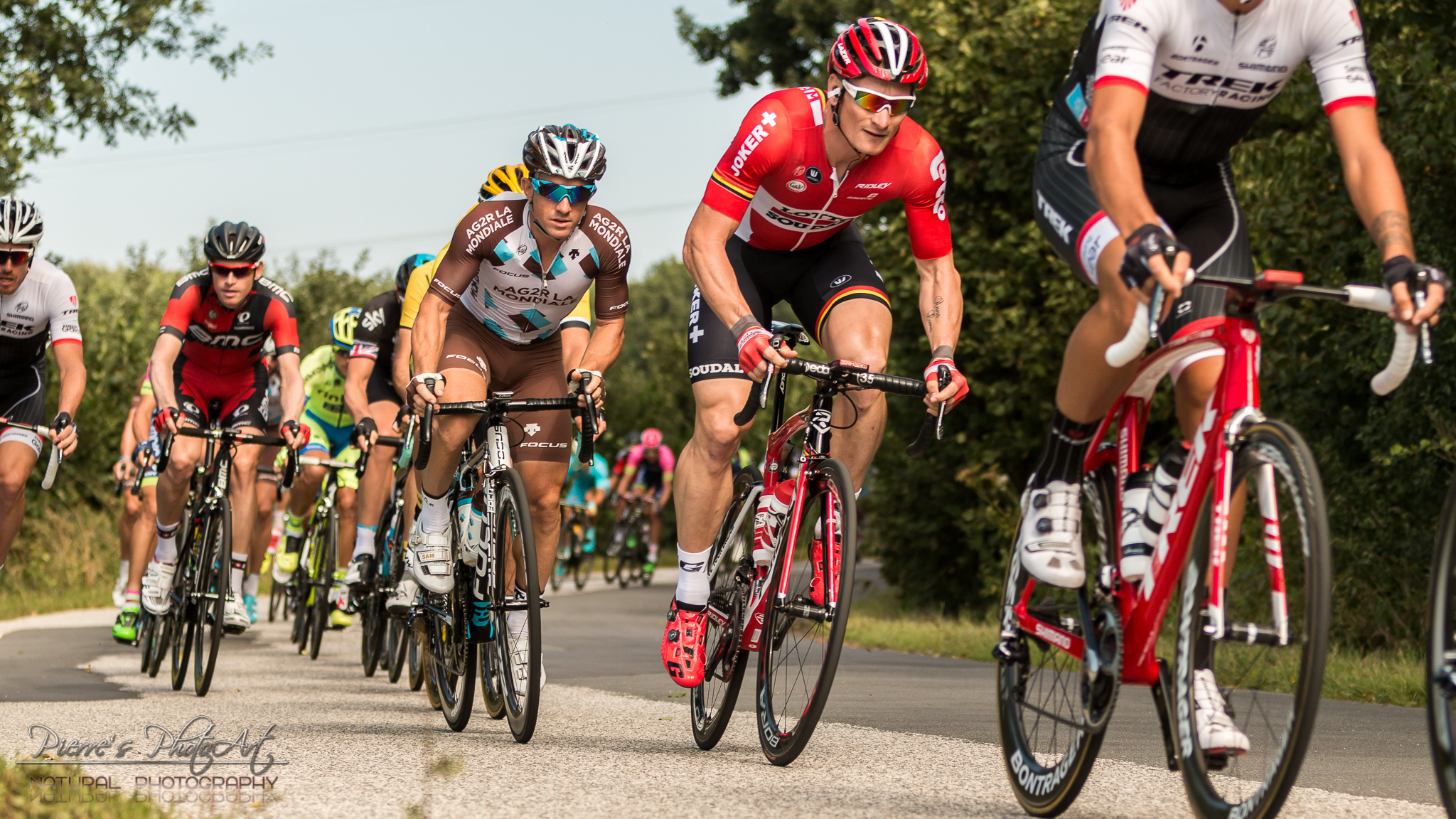
André Greipel (in red) during the 2015 Vattenfall Cyclassics.

In 2002, race sponsor HEW was overtaken by Swedish electricity conglomerate Vattenfall and was renamed Vattenfall Europe Hamburg. Vattenfall, Swedish for Waterfall, became the race's new title sponsor in 2006. In 2005, the race was included in the inaugural UCI ProTour, successor of the World Cup. After the disappearance of the Deutschland Tour in 2009, it remained the only German race at cycling's highest international level. Since 2011 it is one of 24 races of the UCI World Tour. In 2012, UCI extended the race's World Tour license until at least 2016.

Because of its mostly flat course, the race is considered a sprinter's contest and has ended in a mass sprint uninterrupted since 2004. Some of the best sprinters of their generation, including Robbie McEwen, Óscar Freire, Alexander Kristoff and André Greipel, are among the winners of the race. American sprinter Tyler Farrar, winner of the 2009 and 2010 Cyclassics, is the only rider to have won the race two times.

The 2013 race was met with fierce protesting unrelated to the race. Hamburg residents were upset with Vattenfall's environmental policies and its attempts to acquire ownership of the local power grid.

=== EuroEyes Cyclassics ===
In 2015 it was announced that Vattenfall would not extend its partnership with the Hamburg Cyclassics, forcing organizers to search for a new sponsor to provide the estimated 800.000 Euro, a third of the race's budget. From 2016 EuroEyes, a large German provider of laser eye treatment, Femto-LASIK, lens surgeries, and refrative lens exchanges, was the new title sponsor. Australian sprinter Caleb Ewan won the race after the initial winner, Nacer Bouhanni, was relegated.

=== Bemer Cyclassics ===
From 2021 to 2024, the race was known as the Bemer Cyclassics.

=== ADAC Cyclassics ===
The race partnered with the Allgemeiner Deutscher Automobil-Club in 2025, and was renamed the ADAC Cyclassics accordingly.

== Route ==
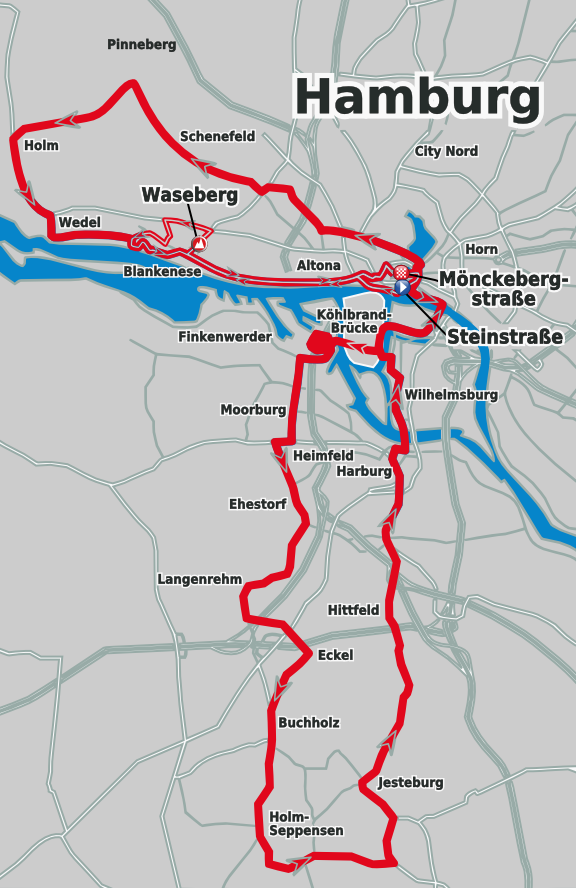
Route of the 2011 Vattenfall Cyclassics.

The race usually starts on the Steinstraße in Hamburg-Altstadt and finishes on Mönckebergstraße, Hamburg's illustrious shopping street in the city's busy commercial district. The distance varies from 225 to 255 km over mainly flat terrain in the hinterland of Hamburg. The route of the race undergoes some changes every year, but the finish location has remained the same throughout.

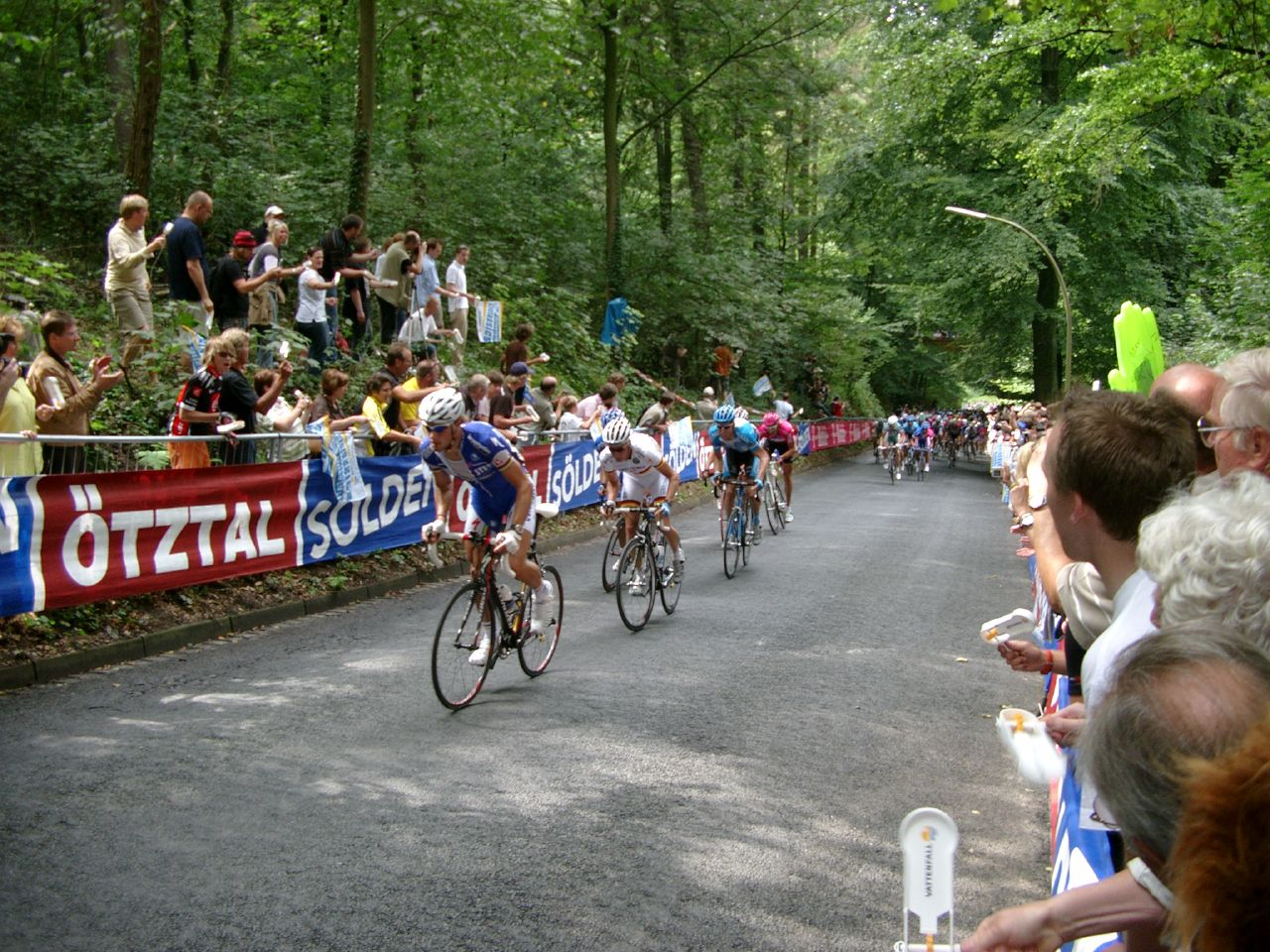
Tom Boonen and Fabian Wegmann climbing Waseberg hill in 2007.

The course's most significant difficulty is Waseberg hill in Blankenese, a suburban quarter of Altona, west of Hamburg's city centre. The race finale consists of three smaller laps west of Hamburg, containing the Waseberg. It is first climbed at 69 kilometres (42.9 mi) from the finish, the second and third ascent are at 28 kilometres (17.4 mi) and 15.5 kilometres (9.6 mi) respectively.

The Waseberg is a steep asphalted hill running up from the north bank of the Elbe river into the suburban centre of Blankenese. Its length is 700 m with a maximum gradient of 16%. It is particularly challenging as the climb immediately follows a sharp curve, causing an abrupt change in gear and cadence. As teams try to position their captains in the front of the peloton, riders often rush furiously over the narrow roads leading to the foot of the climb. The route also includes the Köhlbrandbrücke, Hamburg's highest bridge.

From 2005 until 2014 the first half of the course consisted of a southern loop in the direction of Lüneburg Heath in Lower Saxony, before returning to the centre of Hamburg and branching out to a western loop.

In 2015 organizers changed the parcours to celebrate the twentieth edition of the race. The race started in Kiel, 90 kilometers north of Hamburg, on the western shore of the Baltic Sea, before heading southwest to Hamburg, crossing Schleswig-Holstein. The total distance was shortened to 222 kilometres (137.9 mi), but the final approach into Hamburg, with three ascents of the Waseberg and the finish on the Mönckebergstraße, remained the same. (Note: Note that the source from cyclingquotes.com erroneously names Cologne as the starting location of the race.) The route from Kiel to Hamburg was also chosen to promote the cities' joint bid to host the 2024 Summer Olympics.

Race director Roland Hofer said of the course: "Although the race profile may appear more suitable for sprinters, it can ultimately be won by all types of great riders, and it is exactly this kind of race that is needed for a well-balanced World Tour event [...] The World Tour came to Germany in the midst of a "renaissance" of German cycling, with the latest successes rejuvenating the country's interest in the sport after a setback during the past, doping stricken years."

== Winners ==
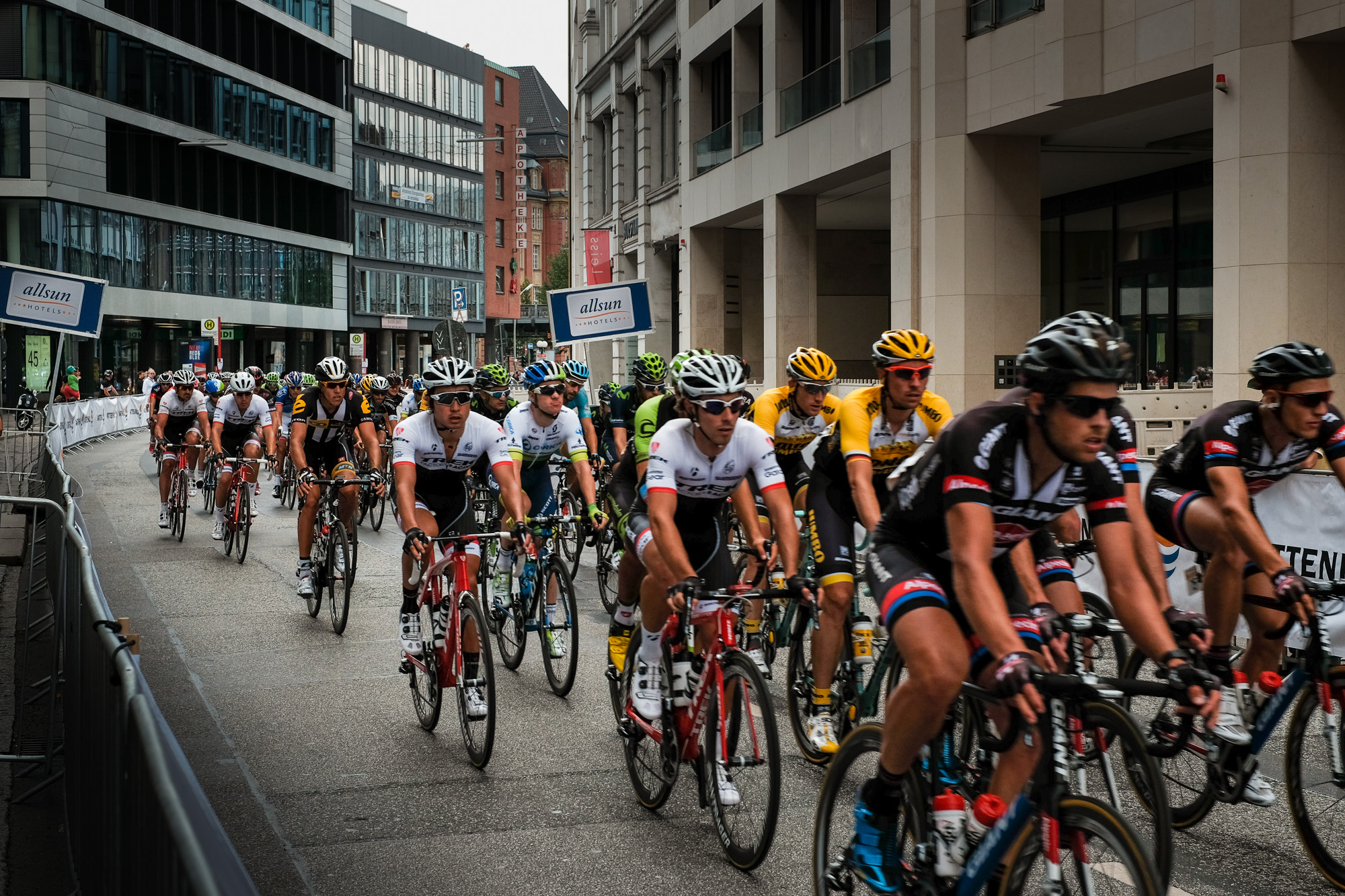
Peloton at Großer Burstah in Hamburg-Altstadt during the race.

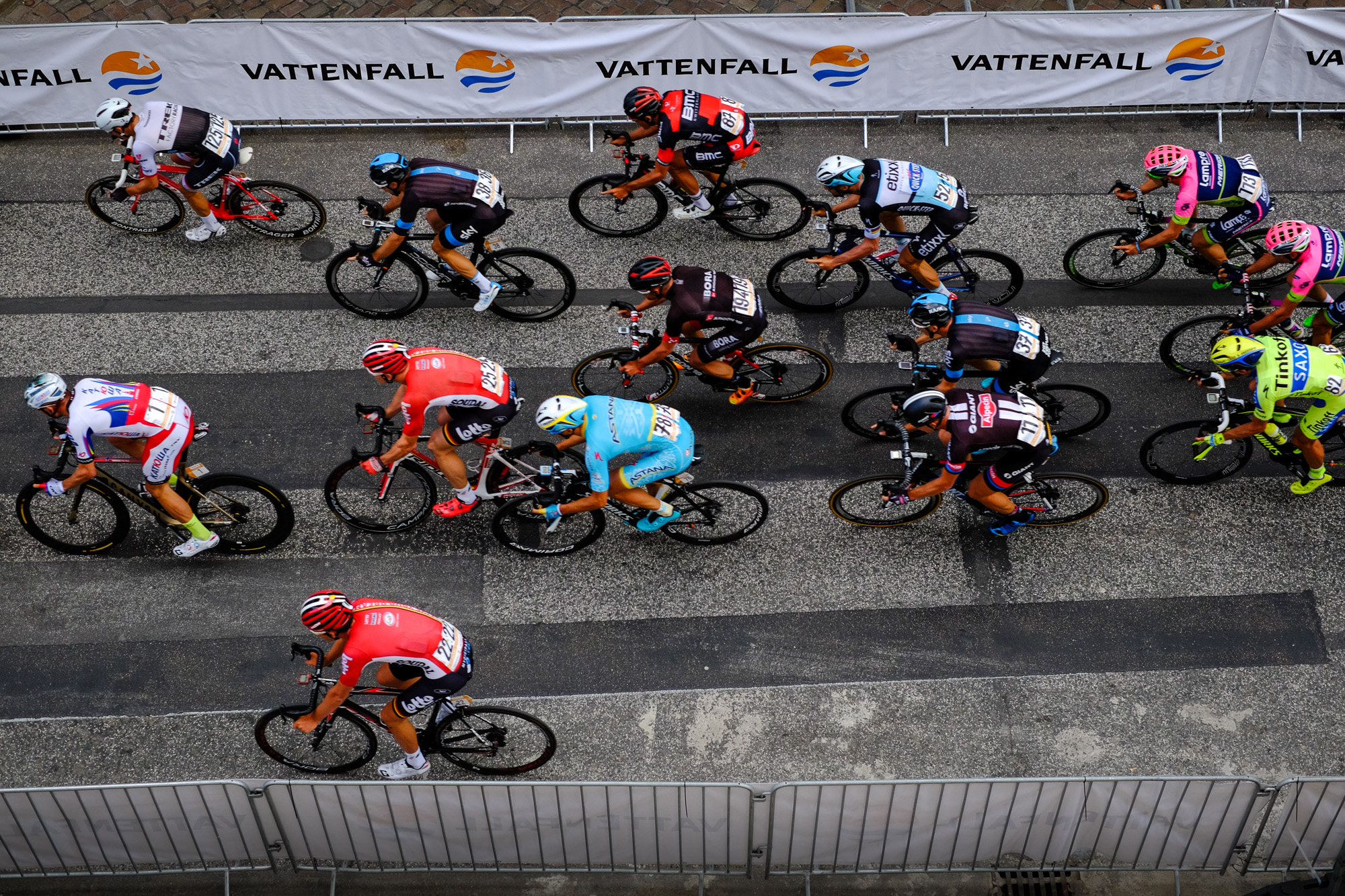
Peloton passing through Hamburg in 2015.

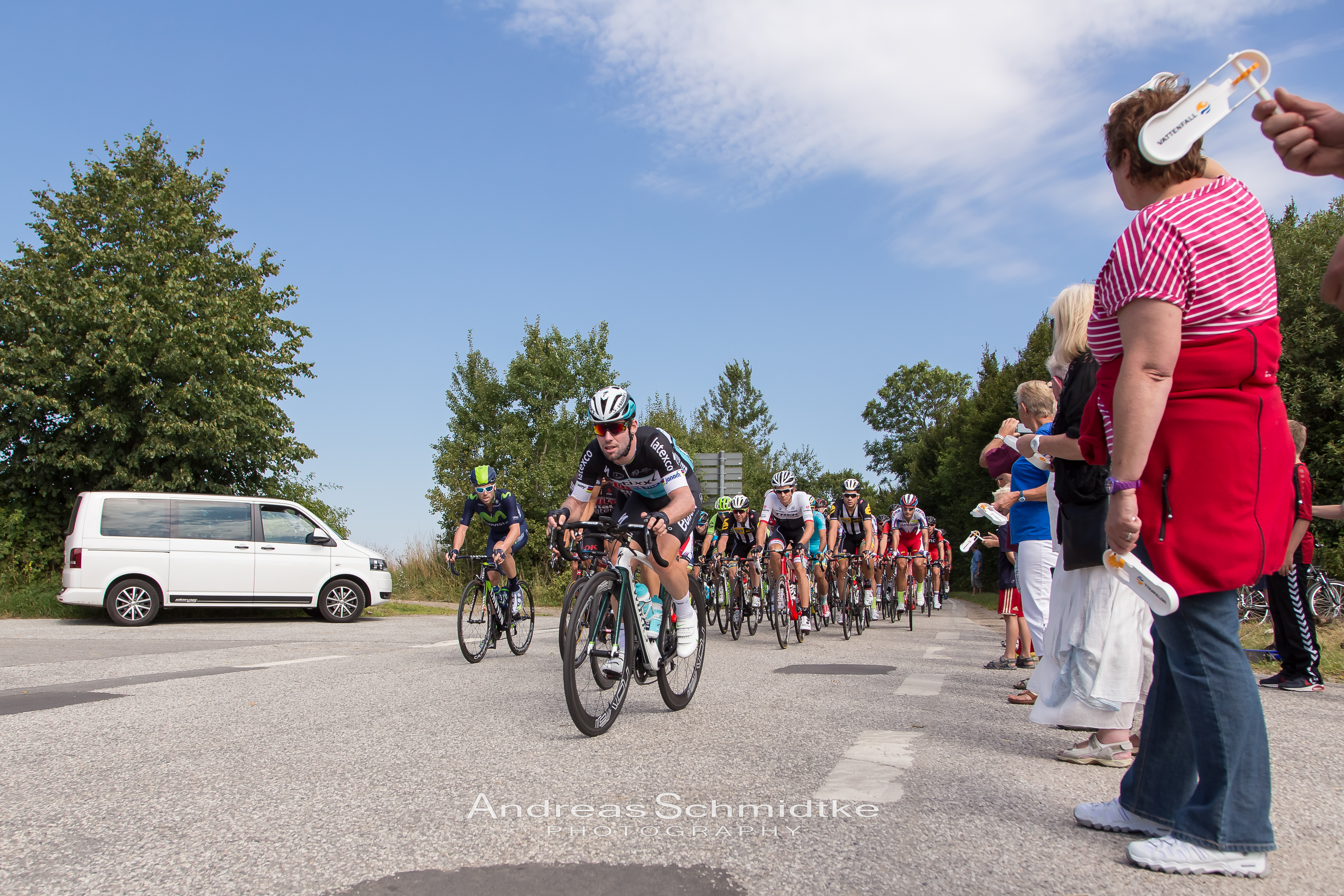
Mark Cavendish leading the peloton.

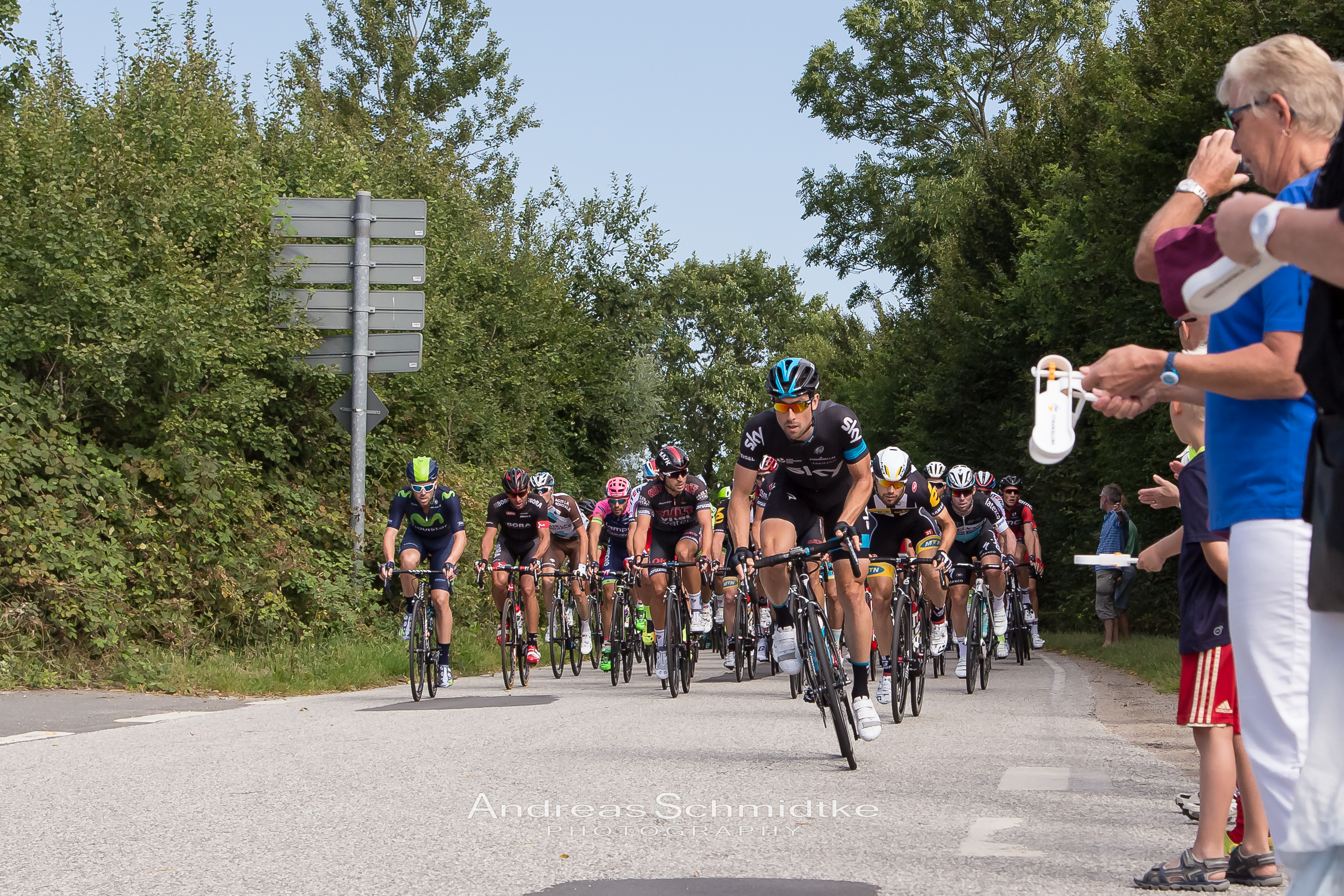
Peloton during the early stretches of the race.

Year	Country	Rider	Team
↓ "HEW Cyclassics" ↓
1996	Italy	Rossano Brasi	Team Polti
1997	Germany	Jan Ullrich	Team Telekom
1998	Netherlands	Léon van Bon	Rabobank
1999	Italy	Mirko Celestino	Team Polti
2000	Italy	Gabriele Missaglia	Lampre–Daikin
2001	Germany	Erik Zabel	Team Telekom
↓ "Vattenfall Europe Hamburg" ↓
2002	Belgium	Johan Museeuw	Domo–Farm Frites
2003	Italy	Paolo Bettini	Quick-Step–Davitamon
2004	Australia	Stuart O'Grady	Cofidis
2005	Italy	Filippo Pozzato	Quick-Step–Innergetic
↓ "Vattenfall Cyclassics" ↓
2006	Spain	Óscar Freire	Rabobank
2007	Italy	Alessandro Ballan	Lampre–Fondital
2008	Australia	Robbie McEwen	Silence–Lotto
2009	United States	Tyler Farrar	Garmin–Slipstream
2010	United States	Tyler Farrar	Garmin–Transitions
2011	Norway	Edvald Boasson Hagen	Team Sky
2012	France	Arnaud Démare	FDJ–BigMat
2013	Germany	John Degenkolb	Argos–Shimano
2014	Norway	Alexander Kristoff	Team Katusha
2015	Germany	André Greipel	Lotto–Soudal
↓ "EuroEyes Cyclassics" ↓
2016	Australia	Caleb Ewan	Orica–BikeExchange
2017	Italy	Elia Viviani	Team Sky
2018	Italy	Elia Viviani	Quick-Step Floors
2019	Italy	Elia Viviani	Deceuninck–Quick-Step
2020	No race due to the COVID-19 pandemic		
↓ "Bemer Cyclassics" ↓
2021	No race due to the COVID-19 pandemic		
2022	Austria	Marco Haller	Bora–Hansgrohe
2023	Denmark	Mads Pedersen	Lidl–Trek
2024	Netherlands	Olav Kooij	Visma–Lease a Bike
↓ "ADAC Cyclassics" ↓
2025	Ireland	Rory Townsend	Q36.5 Pro Cycling Team
2026	France	Paul Magnier	Soudal–Quick-Step

=== Multiple Winners ===
Wins	Rider	Editions
3	Elia Viviani (ITA)	2017, 2018, 2019
2	Tyler Farrar (USA)	2009, 2010

=== Wins per country ===
Wins	Country
9	Italy
4	Germany
3	Australia
2	France; Norway; Netherlands; United States
1	Austria; Belgium; Denmark; Ireland; Spain
