= 2012 Gent–Wevelgem =

2012 UCI World Tour, race 7 of 28
- Event poster with previous winner Tom Boonen

Race details
- Dates: 25 March 2012
- Stages: 1
- Distance: 234.6 km (145.8 mi)
- Winning time: 5h 32' 44"

Results
	Winner	Tom Boonen (Belgium)	(Omega Pharma–Quick-Step)
	Second	Peter Sagan (Slovakia)	(Liquigas–Cannondale)
	Third	Matti Breschel (Denmark)	(Rabobank)

The 2012 Gent–Wevelgem was the 74th running of the Gent–Wevelgem single-day cycling race in Belgium. It was held on 25 March 2012 over a distance of 234.6 kilometres (145.8 miles) between Deinze and Wevelgem, and was the seventh race of the 2012 UCI World Tour season. The winner was Tom Boonen.

In a mass sprint finish, the race was won by Omega Pharma–Quick-Step rider Tom Boonen, who in the process, became the fifth different rider to win the race three times. Boonen finished ahead of Liquigas–Cannondale's Peter Sagan and Rabobank's Matti Breschel, who completed the podium.

== Teams ==
As Gent–Wevelgem was a UCI World Tour event, all 18 UCI ProTeams were invited automatically and obligated to send a squad. Seven other squads were given wildcard places into the race, and as such, formed the event's 25-team peloton. Each team could enter up to eight riders, with the starting peloton being 195 riders.

The 25 teams that competed in the race were:

- Accent.jobs–Willems Veranda's
- Ag2r–La Mondiale
- Astana
- BMC Racing Team
- Cofidis
- Team Europcar
- Euskaltel–Euskadi
- Farnese Vini–Selle Italia
- FDJ–BigMat
- Garmin–Barracuda
- GreenEDGE
- Team Katusha
- Lampre–ISD
- Landbouwkrediet–Euphony
- Liquigas–Cannondale
- Lotto–Belisol
- Movistar Team
- Omega Pharma–Quick-Step
- Project 1t4i
- Rabobank
- RadioShack–Nissan
- Team Saxo Bank
- Team Sky
- Topsport Vlaanderen–Mercator
- Vacansoleil–DCM

== Results ==
	Cyclist	Team	Time	UCI World Tour Points
1	Tom Boonen (BEL)	Omega Pharma–Quick-Step	5h 32' 44"	80
2	Peter Sagan (SVK)	Liquigas–Cannondale	s.t.	60
3	Matti Breschel (DEN)	Rabobank	s.t.	50
4	Óscar Freire (ESP)	Team Katusha	s.t.	40
5	Edvald Boasson Hagen (NOR)	Team Sky	s.t.	30
6	Daniele Bennati (ITA)	RadioShack–Nissan	s.t.	22
7	Marco Marcato (ITA)	Vacansoleil–DCM	s.t.	14
8	Steve Chainel (FRA)	FDJ–BigMat	s.t.	10
9	Filippo Pozzato (ITA)	Farnese Vini–Selle Italia	s.t.	–
10	Giovanni Visconti (ITA)	Movistar Team	s.t.	2

== Women's race ==
A women's race was held for the first time in 2012, on the same day as the men's race but over a shorter course of 114 km (70.8 mi). AA Drink–leontien.nl rider Lizzie Armitstead won after a solo breakaway of nearly 40 km (24.9 mi).

	Cyclist	Team	Time
1	Lizzie Armitstead (UK)	AA Drink–leontien.nl	2h 49' 46"
2	Iris Slappendel (NED)	Rabobank Women Team	+ 51"
3	Jessie Daams (BEL)	AA Drink–leontien.nl	+ 51"
4	Lise Nøstvold (NOR)	Hitec Products–Mistral Home Cycling Team	+ 51"
5	Kirsten Wild (NED)	AA Drink–leontien.nl	+ 55"
