= 2010 Vattenfall Cyclassics =

Vattenfall Cyclassics
2010 UCI World Ranking, race 20 of 26

Race details
- Dates: August 15, 2010
- Stages: 1
- Distance: 225 km (140 mi)
- Winning time: 5h 02' 36"

Results
	Winner	Tyler Farrar (USA)	(Garmin–Transitions)
	Second	Edvald Boasson Hagen (NOR)	(Team Sky)
	Third	André Greipel (GER)	(Team HTC–Columbia)

The 2010 Vattenfall Cyclassics was a one-day road race, which is part of the 2010 UCI ProTour, it took place on 15 August 2010. The race covered a total of 225 kilometres (140 mi) and took place in Hamburg, Germany.

== Teams ==
Twenty-one teams were invited to the 2010 Vattenfall Cyclassics.

Teams from the UCI Pro Tour

- Ag2r–La Mondiale
- Astana
- Caisse d'Epargne
- Euskaltel–Euskadi
- Footon–Servetto–Fuji
- Française des Jeux
- Garmin–Transitions
- Lampre–Farnese
- Liquigas–Doimo
- Omega Pharma–Lotto
- Quick-Step
- Rabobank
- Team Sky
- Team HTC–Columbia
- Team Katusha
- Team Milram
- Team RadioShack
- Team Saxo Bank

Teams awarded a wildcard invitation

- Vacansoleil
- BMC Racing Team
- Skil–Shimano

== Results ==
Rank	Cyclist	Team	Time	UCI World Ranking Points
1	Tyler Farrar (USA)	Garmin–Transitions	5h 02' 36"	80
2	Edvald Boasson Hagen (NOR)	Team Sky	s.t.	60
3	André Greipel (GER)	Team HTC–Columbia	s.t.	50
4	Alexander Kristoff (NOR)	BMC Racing Team	s.t.	40
5	Allan Davis (AUS)	Astana	s.t.	30
6	Daniele Bennati (ITA)	Liquigas–Doimo	s.t.	20
7	Thomas Leezer (NED)	Rabobank	s.t.	10
8	Enrique Mata (ESP)	Footon–Servetto–Fuji	s.t.	8
9	Sébastien Hinault (FRA)	Ag2r–La Mondiale	s.t.	6
10	Marco Marcato (ITA)	Vacansoleil	s.t.	2
11	Yoann Offredo (FRA)	FDJ	s.t.	-
12	Jürgen Roelandts (BEL)	Omega Pharma–Lotto	s.t.	-
13	Frédéric Guesdon (FRA)	FDJ	s.t.	–
14	Peter Wrolich (AUT)	Team Milram	s.t.	–
15	Kevin Hulsmans (BEL)	Quick-Step	s.t.	-
