= 2015 Vattenfall Cyclassics =

2015 UCI World Tour, race 23 of 28
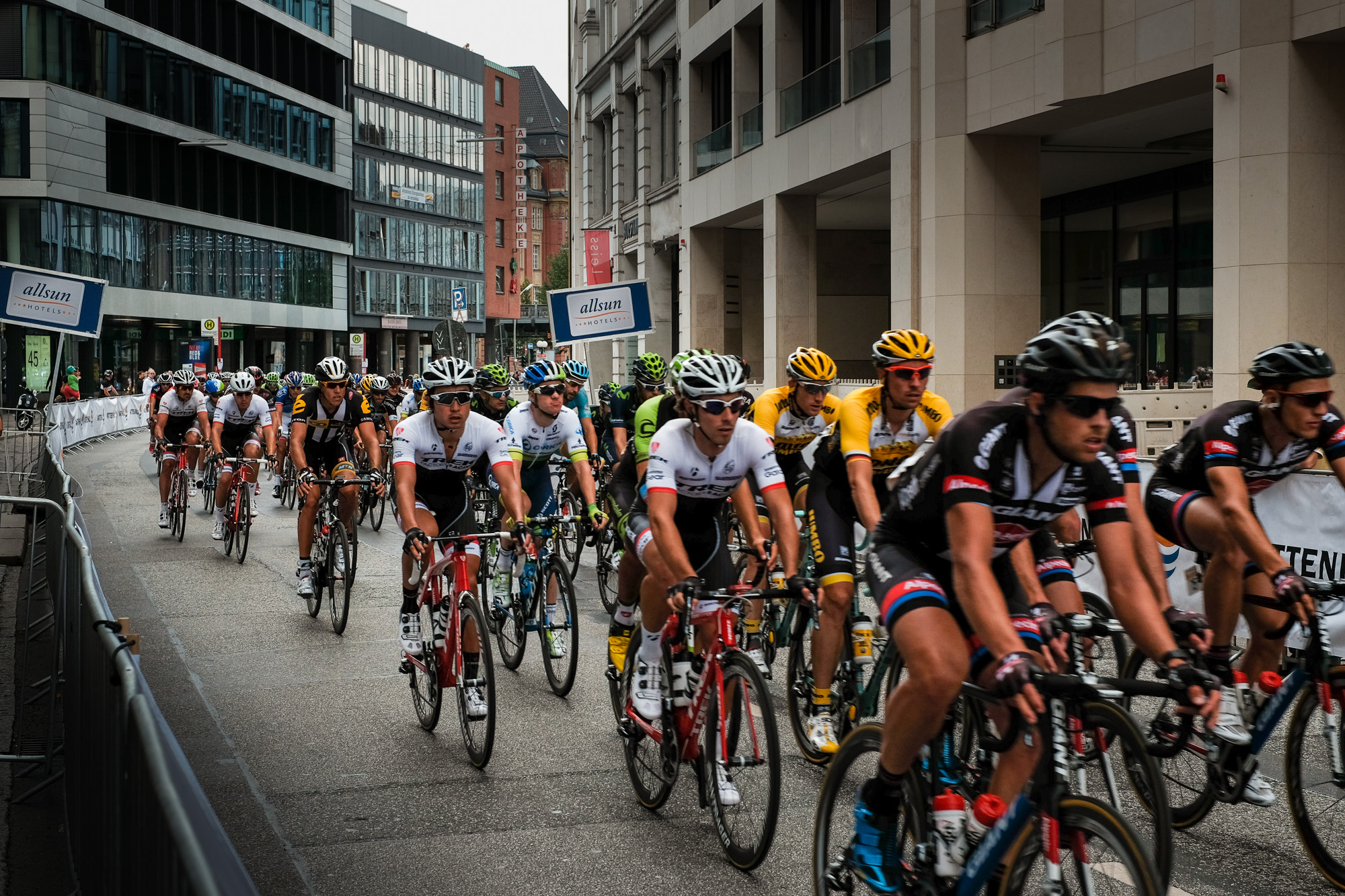
- The peloton during the race

Race details
- Dates: 23 August 2015
- Stages: 1
- Distance: 221.3 km (137.5 mi)
- Winning time: 4h 57' 05"

Results
	Winner	André Greipel (GER)	(Lotto–Soudal)
	Second	Alexander Kristoff (NOR)	(Team Katusha)
	Third	Giacomo Nizzolo (ITA)	(Trek Factory Racing)

The 2015 Vattenfall Cyclassics was a one-day classic cycling race that took place in Northern Germany on 23 August. It was the 20th edition of the Vattenfall Cyclassics one-day cycling race, and was the twenty-third race of the 2015 UCI World Tour. The race started in Kiel and ended in Hamburg. The course was mainly flat; the race generally suits sprinters, such as the defending champion, Alexander Kristoff (Team Katusha).

Despite several attacks in the late part of the race, the outcome was decided in a sprint finish. Pre-race favourite Marcel Kittel (Team Giant–Alpecin) was dropped on the final climb, while Mark Cavendish (Etixx–Quick-Step) was caught up in a crash with 3 kilometres (2 mi) remaining. Kristoff started the sprint, but André Greipel (Lotto–Soudal) was able to follow him and come past to take his first victory in a one-day World Tour race. With Kristoff finishing second, third place was taken by Giacomo Nizzolo (Trek Factory Racing).

== Route and background ==
The Vattenfall Cyclassics was the only UCI World Tour race held in Germany during the 2015 season. To celebrate the twentieth anniversary of the race, the organizers picked a new route, starting on board of the ferry MS Stena Scandinavica in the harbour of Kiel, and heading in a southwesterly direction towards Hamburg. The overall distance was shortened from 247.2 kilometres (153.6 mi) in the previous year to 221.3 kilometres (137.5 mi). (Note: Please note that the source from cyclingquotes.com wrongly names Cologne as the starting point of the race.) The final kilometers inside the city remained the same, with the finish line on Mönckebergstrasse. The course was largely flat, thereby suiting sprinters. However, the 0.7 kilometres (0.4 mi) Waseberg with a gradient of up to 15% was to be climbed three times. The first ascent of the Waseberg came with 68.9 kilometres (42.8 mi) left to ride, the second and third at 28.3 kilometres (17.6 mi) and 15.5 kilometres (9.6 mi) respectively. Race director Roland Hofer said of the course: "Although the race profile may appear more suitable for the sprinters, it can ultimately be won by all types of great rider, and it’s exactly this kind of race that’s needed for a well-balanced WorldTour."

The World Tour came to Germany in the midst of a "renaissance" in German cycling, with the latest successes rejuvenating the country's interest in the sport after a series of setbacks during the past, doping-stricken years. For the first time since 2008, German public broadcaster ARD decided to provide live footage of the race. The route from Kiel to Hamburg was also chosen to boost the two cities' joint bid for the 2024 Summer Olympics. This was the last time the race ran under the name of Vattenfall Cyclassics, as Vattenfall announced that they would not extend their sponsorship. The energy provider had a significant role in the establishment of the race in 1996, under its earlier name HEW. The event was forced to search for a new sponsor to provide the estimated 800,000 Euro previously supplied by Vattenfall, about a third of the race's budget. From 2016 onward, the race was known as the EuroEyes Cyclassics in a two-year deal signed in July 2016.

== Teams ==
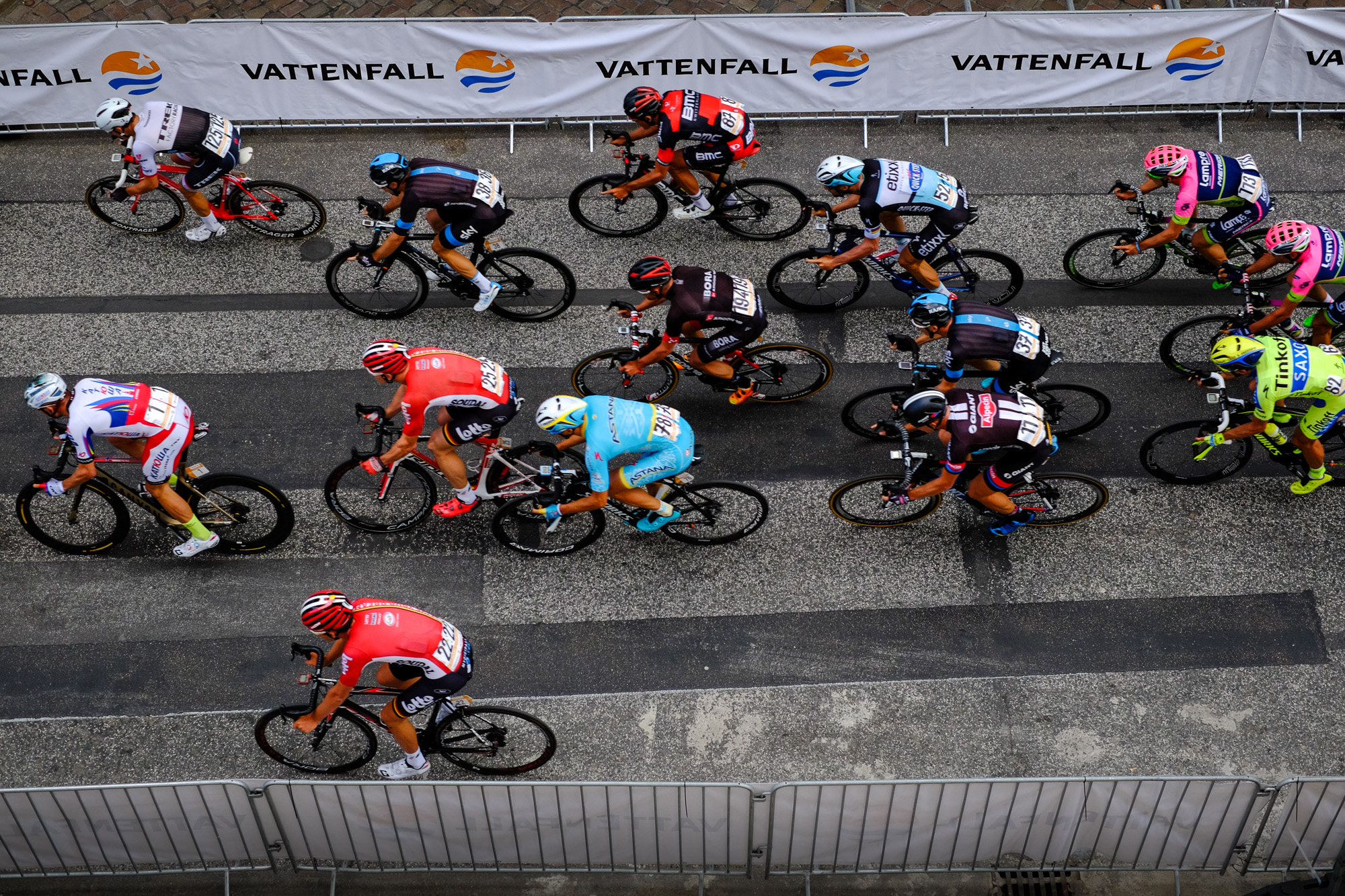
The peloton passes through Hamburg. Pictured are, among others, Alexander Kristoff (#1), André Greipel (#25), Tom Boonen (#52) and Giacomo Nizzolo (#125).

All 17 UCI WorldTeams are automatically entered and obliged to send a team to the race. Three UCI Professional Continental teams were also invited as wildcards. All twenty teams entered eight riders each, meaning that 160 riders took to the course.

UCI WorldTeams

- AG2R La Mondiale
- Astana
- BMC Racing Team
- Etixx–Quick-Step
- FDJ
- IAM Cycling
- Lampre–Merida
- Lotto–Soudal
- Movistar Team
- Orica–GreenEDGE
- Cannondale–Garmin
- Team Giant–Alpecin
- Team Katusha
- LottoNL–Jumbo
- Team Sky
- Tinkoff–Saxo
- Trek Factory Racing

UCI Professional Continental teams

- Bora–Argon 18
- Cult Energy Pro Cycling
- MTN–Qhubeka

== Pre-race favourites ==
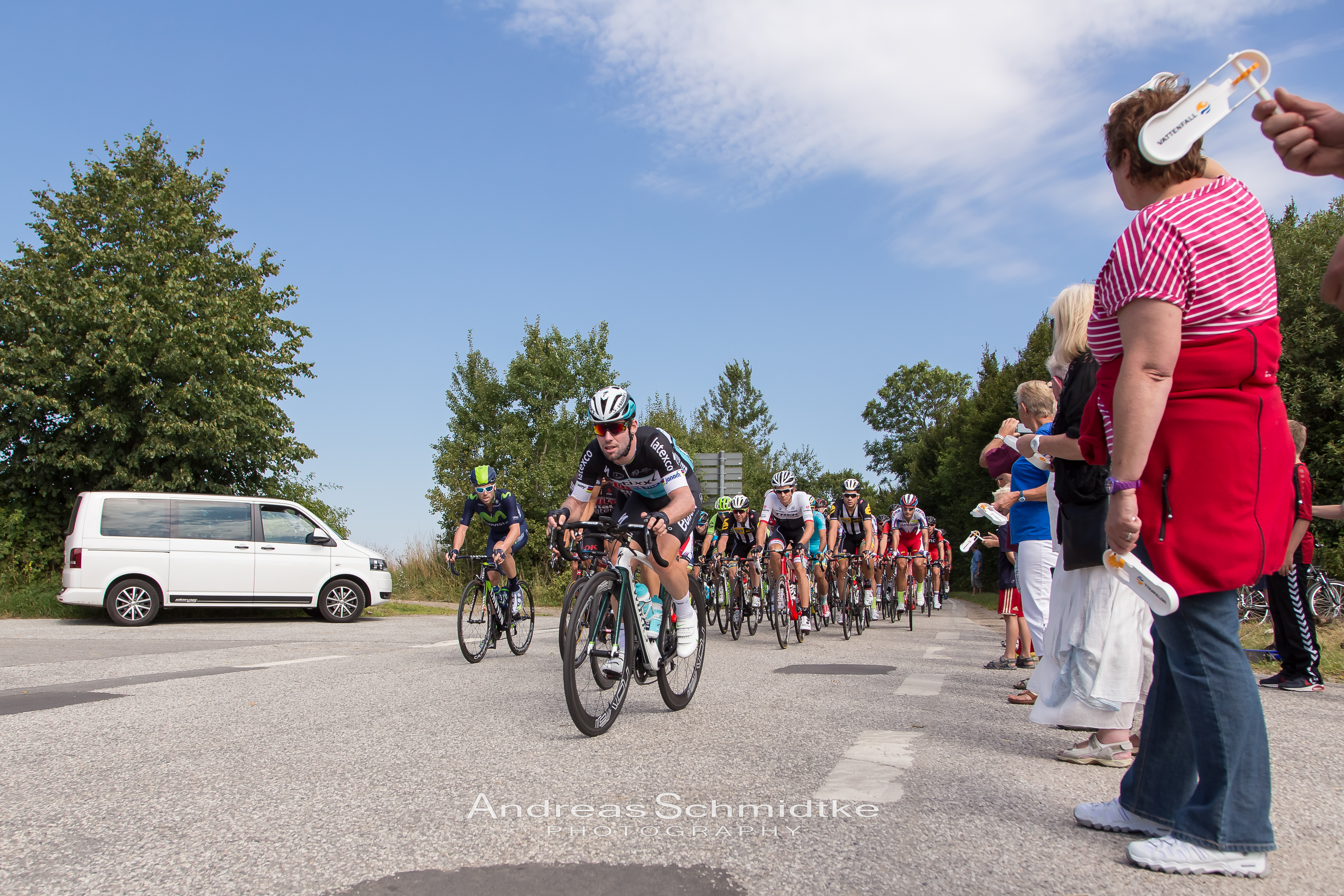
Mark Cavendish, seen in the peloton during the race, was considered a favourite, but was later involved in a crash.

Given the nature of the course, a large number of sprint specialists came to the race, including local favourites Marcel Kittel (Team Giant–Alpecin) and André Greipel (Lotto–Soudal). Greipel came to the Cyclassics after having recently won a career-best four stages at the Tour de France, and another stage win at the Eneco Tour. Meanwhile, Kittel rode as captain for Team Giant–Alpecin, while his teammate, 2013 winner John Degenkolb, went to compete in the Vuelta a España. Kittel had returned to competition after an illness just a week earlier at the Tour de Pologne, winning a stage. He would race with the support of his sprinter teammates Nikias Arndt and Ramon Sinkeldam. Both Greipel and Kittel gave hope to the local fans for a German victory. Since the event was renamed from HEW Cyclassics into Vattenfall Cyclassics in 2006, Degenkolb had been the only German winner, in 2013. Coming into the race carrying his good form from the Tour de France, Greipel was seen as the more likely contender for race victory than Kittel. Gerald Ciolek (MTN–Qhubeka) and Rick Zabel (BMC Racing Team) were two more sprinters considered to have ambitions to win the race, while an attack by Tony Martin (Etixx–Quick-Step) was deemed "a distinct possibility". For Martin, it was the first race after he broke his collarbone while wearing the yellow jersey at the Tour de France.

The main non-German favourites for the win were the previous year's winner Alexander Kristoff, (Team Katusha) and Mark Cavendish (Etixx–Quick-Step). While Kristoff came from a "disappointing Tour de France", Cavendish could count on the support of teammates Mark Renshaw and Tom Boonen, who was preparing for the Road World Championships in late September. Arnaud Démare (FDJ), who had won the race in 2012, was competing, as was 2011 winner Edvald Boasson Hagen (MTN–Qhubeka). Other riders in contention for the victory were Ben Swift, Elia Viviani (both Team Sky), Michael Albasini (Orica–GreenEDGE), Samuel Dumoulin (AG2R La Mondiale), Sacha Modolo (Lampre–Merida), Moreno Hofland (LottoNL–Jumbo), and Giacomo Nizzolo (Trek Factory Racing). Tinkoff–Saxo aimed to defy the odds of a sprint finish, and named Matti Breschel as their captain. Sam Bennett (Bora–Argon 18) was named as a "very strong outsider".

== Race report ==
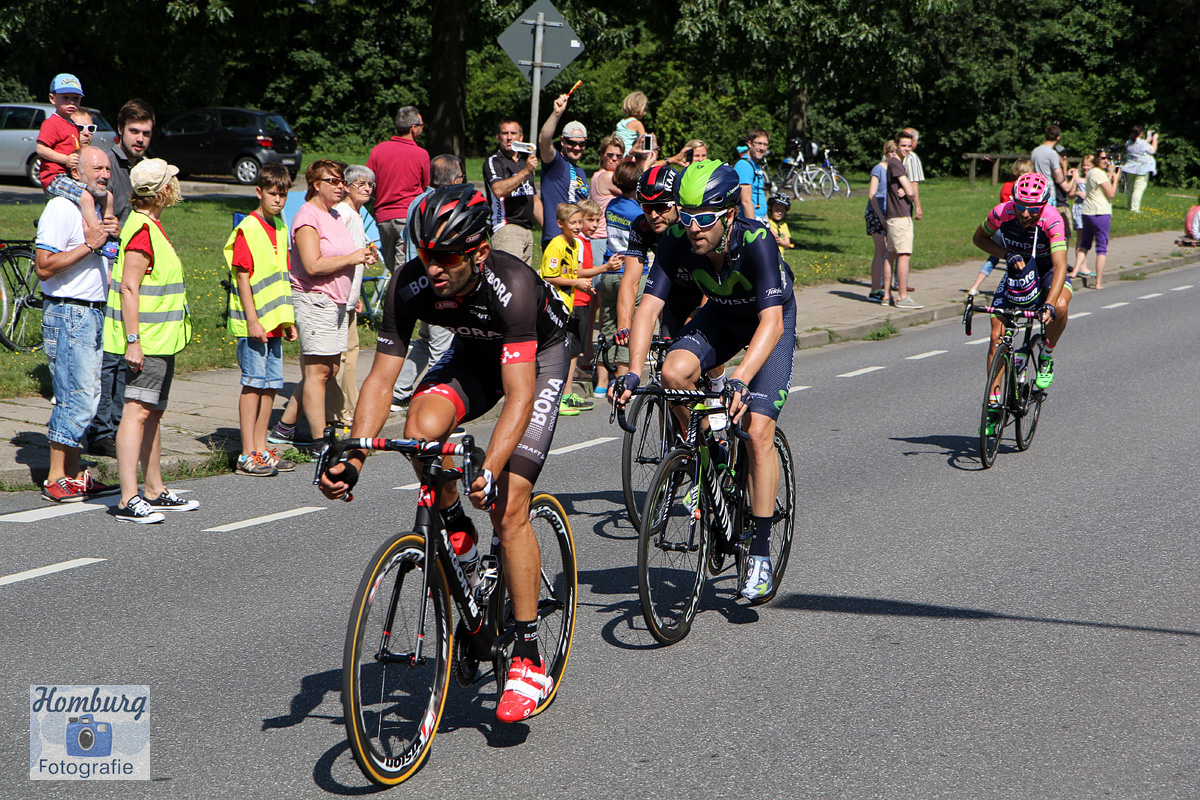
The leading group that formed shortly after the start

Shortly after the peloton left the ferry in Kiel's harbour, an early breakaway formed, including Jan Bárta (Bora–Argon 18), Matteo Bono (Lampre–Merida), Alex Dowsett (Movistar Team), and Martin Mortensen (Cult Energy Pro Cycling). The group was able to establish a lead of up to five minutes, while MTN–Qhubeka controlled the pace in the field for most of the day, before Lotto–Soudal and Etixx–Quick-Step joined them at the front for their respective team captains. 60 kilometres (37.3 mi) from the finish, the lead group had broken up, with only Bono and Mortensen left with a lead of less than one minute. With 43 kilometres (26.7 mi) left to ride, the two were joined by former road race world champion Philippe Gilbert (BMC Racing Team), Manuele Boaro (Tinkoff–Saxo), and Matthias Brändle (IAM Cycling), now leading by about half a minute. 20 km from the finish, the peloton had caught the escape group, and a field of about 75 riders was set to ride for the race victory.

Another late attack came from Linus Gerdemann (Cult Energy Pro Cycling) and Julian Alaphilippe (Etixx–Quick-Step), but they were unable to build a significant gap, and were reeled back in with 10 kilometres (6.2 mi) to go. Meanwhile, favourite Marcel Kittel dropped out of the field at the last ascend of the Waseberg, ruling him out of contention. Mark Cavendish was involved in a crash with 3 kilometres (1.9 mi) to go. While the sprint trains fought for the lead of the field, Cavendish touched wheels with another rider and was brought to the ground. He was able to continue and eventually finished 66th, but was unable to compete for the victory. At the finish line, the victory was decided by a bunch sprint. Kristoff was the first to open the sprint, but Greipel was able to get around him to claim his first ever win in a one-day World Tour race. Italian rider Giacomo Nizzolo claimed third for Trek Factory Racing.

== Results ==
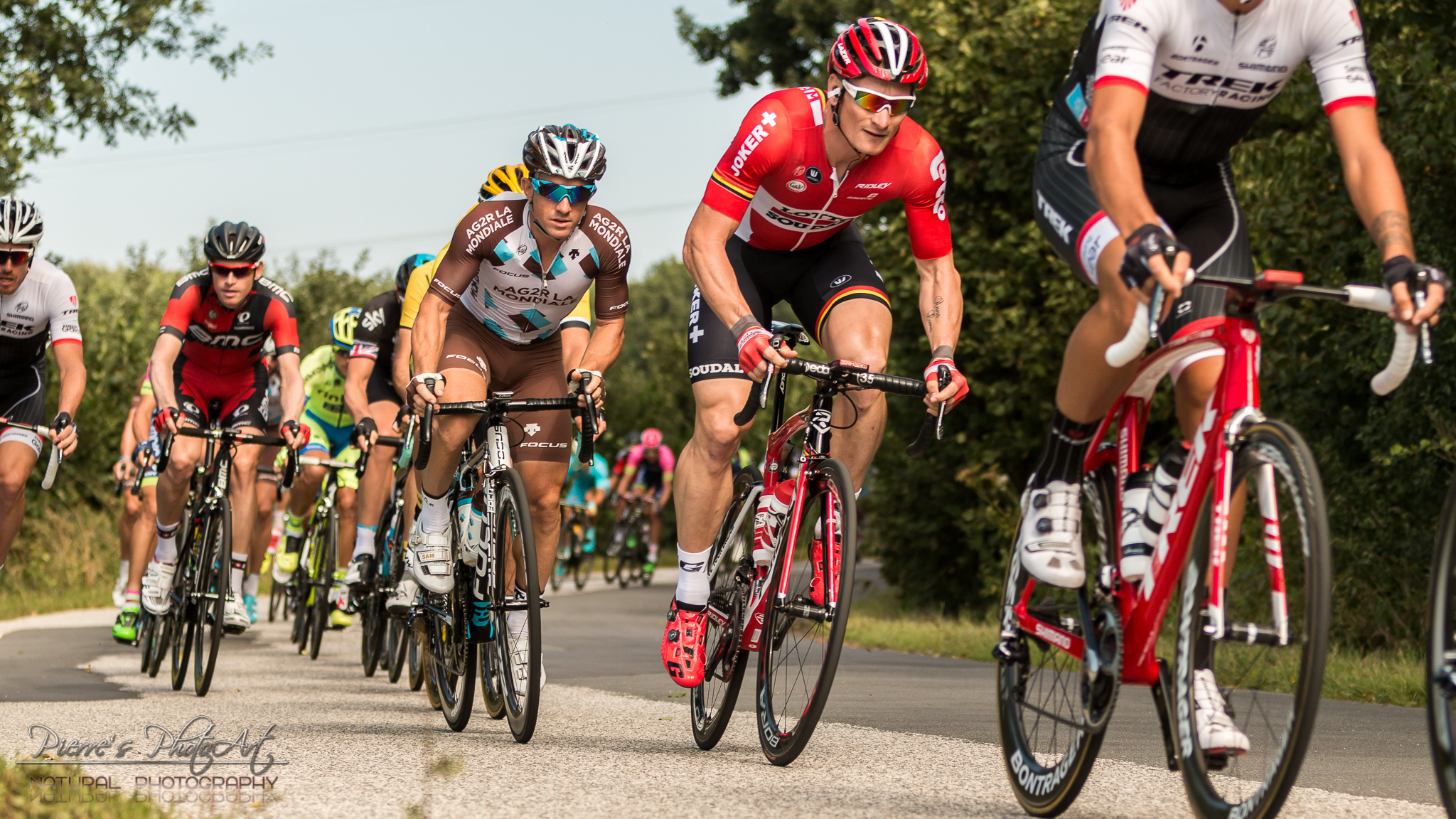
Eventual winner André Greipel (second from the right) in the peloton

Result
Rank	Rider	Team	Time
1	André Greipel (GER)	Lotto–Soudal	4hr 57' 05"
2	Alexander Kristoff (NOR)	Team Katusha	+0"
3	Giacomo Nizzolo (ITA)	Trek Factory Racing	+0"
4	Tom Boonen (BEL)	Etixx–Quick-Step	+0"
5	Greg Van Avermaet (BEL)	BMC Racing Team	+0"
6	Arnaud Démare (FRA)	FDJ	+0"
7	Matti Breschel (DEN)	Tinkoff–Saxo	+0"
8	Ramon Sinkeldam (NED)	Team Giant–Alpecin	+0"
9	Niccolo Bonifazio (ITA)	Lampre–Merida	+0"
10	Rasmus Guldhammer (DEN)	Cult Energy Pro Cycling	+0"
Source: ProCyclingStats
