= 2007 Vattenfall Cyclassics =

Twelfth edition of the race

Race details
- Dates: August 19
- Stages: 1
- Distance: 229.1 km (142.4 mi)
- Winning time: 5h 21' 05"

Results
| | Winner | Alessandro Ballan (ITA) | (Lampre–Fondital) |
| | Second | Óscar Freire (ESP) | (Rabobank) |
| | Third | Gerald Ciolek (GER) | (T-Mobile Team) |

The 2007 edition of the Vattenfall Cyclassics cycle race took place in the German city of Hamburg on August 19, 2007. Alessandro Ballan won the race, beating last years winner Óscar Freire.

== General Standings ==
=== 2007-19-08: Hamburg-Hamburg, 229,1 km ===
| | Name | Team | Time | UCI ProTour Points |
|---|---|---|---|---|
| 1 | Alessandro Ballan (ITA) | Lampre–Fondital | 5h 21' 05" | 40 |
| 2 | Óscar Freire (ESP) | Rabobank | s.t | 30 |
| 3 | Gerald Ciolek (GER) | T-Mobile Team | s.t | 25 |
| 4 | Danilo Napolitano (ITA) | Lampre–Fondital | s.t | 20 |
| 5 | Erik Zabel (GER) | Milram | s.t | 15 |
| 6 | Davide Rebellin (ITA) | Gerolsteiner | s.t | 11 |
| 7 | Paolo Bettini (ITA) | Quick-Step–Innergetic | s.t | 7 |
| 8 | Greg Van Avermaet (BEL) | Predictor–Lotto | s.t | 5 |
| 9 | Peter Wrolich (AUT) | Gerolsteiner | s.t | 3 |
| 10 | Olaf Pollack (GER) | Wiesenhof–Felt | s.t | N/A |

Olaf Pollack received no UCI ProTour points because his team, Wiesenhof–Felt, is not part of the UCI ProTour.
