= 2017 EuroEyes Cyclassics =

2017 UCI World Tour, race 31 of 37
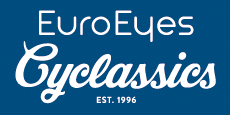

Race details
- Dates: 20 August 2017
- Stages: 1
- Distance: 220.9 km (137.3 mi)
- Winning time: 5h 15' 51"

Results
| | Winner | Elia Viviani (ITA) | (Team Sky) |
| | Second | Arnaud Démare (FRA) | (FDJ) |
| | Third | Dylan Groenewegen (NED) | (LottoNL–Jumbo) |

The 2017 EuroEyes Cyclassics was a road cycling one-day race that took place on 20 August. It was the 22nd edition of the EuroEyes Cyclassics and the 31st race of the 2017 UCI World Tour. It was won by Elia Viviani in the sprint.

== Teams ==
As the EuroEyes Cyclassics was a UCI World Tour event, all eighteen UCI WorldTeams were invited automatically and obliged to enter a team in the race. Three UCI Professional Continental teams – CCC–Sprandi–Polkowice, Cofidis and Gazprom–RusVelo – competed, completing the 21-team peloton.

UCI WorldTeams

- AG2R La Mondiale
- Astana
- Bahrain–Merida
- BMC Racing Team
- Bora–Hansgrohe
- Cannondale–Drapac
- Team Dimension Data
- FDJ
- Team Katusha–Alpecin
- LottoNL–Jumbo
- Lotto–Soudal
- Movistar Team
- Orica–Scott
- Quick-Step Floors
- Team Sky
- Team Sunweb
- Trek–Segafredo
- UAE Team Emirates

UCI Professional Continental teams

- CCC–Sprandi–Polkowice
- Cofidis
- Gazprom–RusVelo

== Result ==
Result
| Rank | Rider | Team | Time |
|---|---|---|---|
| 1 | Elia Viviani (ITA) | Team Sky | 5h 15' 51" |
| 2 | Arnaud Démare (FRA) | FDJ | + 0" |
| 3 | Dylan Groenewegen (NED) | LottoNL–Jumbo | + 0" |
| 4 | Alexander Kristoff (NOR) | Team Katusha–Alpecin | + 0" |
| 5 | André Greipel (GER) | Lotto–Soudal | + 0" |
| 6 | Maximiliano Richeze (ARG) | Quick-Step Floors | + 0" |
| 7 | Jasper Stuyven (BEL) | Trek–Segafredo | + 0" |
| 8 | Marko Kump (SLO) | UAE Team Emirates | + 0" |
| 9 | Nacer Bouhanni (FRA) | Cofidis | + 0" |
| 10 | Rudy Barbier (FRA) | AG2R La Mondiale | + 0" |
