= 2010 Quick-Step season =

Quick-Step
- 2010 season
- UCI code: QST
- Status: UCI ProTeam
- World Ranking: 16th (325 points)
- Manager: Patrick Lefevere
- Based: Belgium

Season victories
- One-day races: 2
- Stage race overall: 1
- Stage race stages: 10
- National Championships: 3
- Most wins: Tom Boonen (4 wins)
- Best ranked rider: Tom Boonen (19th)

The 2010 season for Quick-Step began in January with the Tour Down Under and ended in October at the Giro di Lombardia. As a UCI ProTour team, they were automatically invited and obliged to attend every event in the ProTour. The team looks to remain as one of the world's foremost in the spring classics. Its ridership is mostly unchanged from 2009, in spite of an offseason attempt to sign reigning Tour de France champion Alberto Contador.

== 2010 roster ==
Ages as of January 1, 2010.

Rider	Date of birth
Carlos Barredo (ESP)	June 5, 1981 (aged 28)
Tom Boonen (BEL)	October 15, 1980 (aged 29)
Dario Cataldo (ITA)	March 17, 1985 (aged 24)
Sylvain Chavanel (FRA)	June 30, 1979 (aged 30)
Kevin De Weert (BEL)	May 27, 1982 (aged 27)
Stijn Devolder (BEL)	August 29, 1979 (aged 30)
Dries Devenyns (BEL)	July 22, 1983 (aged 26)
Addy Engels (NED)	June 16, 1977 (aged 32)
Mauro Facci (ITA)	May 11, 1982 (aged 27)
Kurt Hovelijnck (BEL)	June 2, 1981 (aged 28)
Kevin Hulsmans (BEL)	April 11, 1978 (aged 31)
Iljo Keisse (BEL)	December 21, 1982 (aged 27)
Andrei Kunitski (BLR)	July 2, 1984 (aged 25)
Thomas Kvist (DEN)	August 18, 1987 (aged 22)

Rider	Date of birth
Nikolas Maes (BEL)	April 9, 1986 (aged 23)
Davide Malacarne (ITA)	July 11, 1987 (aged 22)
Jérôme Pineau (FRA)	January 2, 1980 (aged 29)
Francesco Reda (ITA)	November 19, 1982 (aged 27)
Branislau Samoilau (BLR)	May 25, 1985 (aged 24)
Kevin Seeldraeyers (BEL)	September 12, 1986 (aged 23)
Andreas Stauff (GER)	January 22, 1987 (aged 22)
Matteo Tosatto (ITA)	May 14, 1974 (aged 35)
Jurgen Van de Walle (BEL)	February 9, 1977 (aged 32)
Kevin Van Impe (BEL)	April 19, 1981 (aged 28)
Marco Velo (ITA)	March 9, 1974 (aged 35)
Wouter Weylandt (BEL)	September 27, 1984 (aged 25)
Maarten Wynants (BEL)	May 13, 1982 (aged 27)

Riders who joined the team for the 2010 season

Rider	2009 team
Iljo Keisse	John Saey-Deschacht-Huyanda
Andrei Kunitski	Amica Chips–Knauf
Nikolas Maes	Topsport Vlaanderen–Mercator
Branislau Samoilau	Amica Chips–Knauf
Andreas Stauff	neo-pro

Riders who left the team during or after the 2009 season

Rider	2010 team
Dominique Cornu	Skil–Shimano
Allan Davis	Astana
Steven De Jongh	Retired
Sébastien Rosseler	Team RadioShack
Hubert Schwab	Vorarlberg–Corratec

== Stage races ==
After beginning their season at the Tour Down Under with no victories, Quick Step then entered the Tour of Qatar with two-time defending champion Boonen leading their squad. Boonen won two stages in the race, but a two-man breakaway in the race's second stage proved critical, as it afforded Wouter Mol and Geert Steurs the top two steps on the podium by more than a minute over the rest of the field. Boonen finished third overall.

== Grand Tours ==
=== Giro d'Italia ===
Quick Step came to the Giro with a squad headed by Cataldo. Seeldraeyers, who had won the youth classification in the 2009 Giro d'Italia, was kept off the squad in favor of the Tour de France. Weylandt was included with sprint victories in mind.

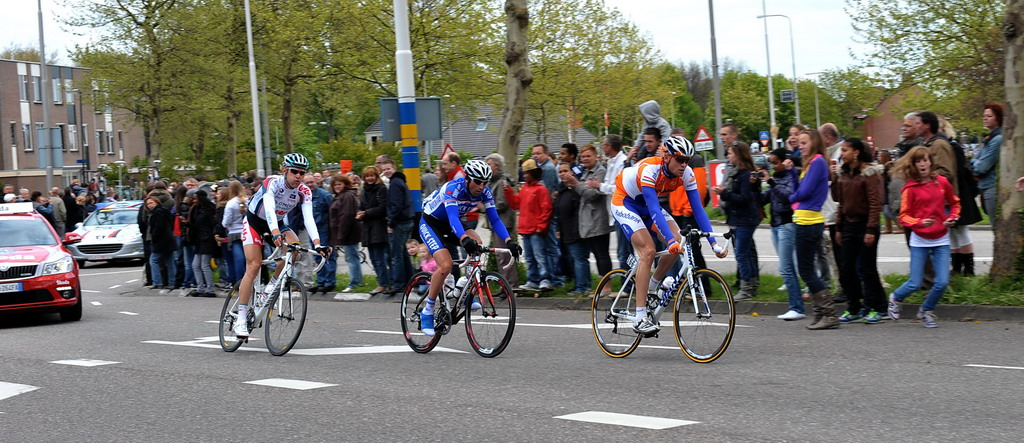
Jérôme Pineau, riding with Tom Stamsnijder and Olivier Kaisen during stage 3 of the Giro, which Quick Step rider Wouter Weylandt went on to win.

In stage 3, the second of two road race stages in the Netherlands, Weylandt was successful at avoiding crashes, including one with 30 km (19 mi) left to race that made for a selection of just 29 riders finishing the stage together. Weyldant sprinted Graeme Brown and Robert Förster to take the stage win. After the transfer to Italy, the squad finished in 16th place in the stage 4 team time trial, finishing with six riders 2'15" off the pace of stage winners Liquigas–Doimo. The squad was again active in stage 5. Pineau followed an early morning move from Bbox Bouygues Telecom rider Yukiya Arashiro, and they, along with Cofidis' Julien Fouchard formed the day's breakaway. The stage was flat, and in the final kilometers the sprinters' teams came to the front of the peloton to try to catch them. They did not time their move properly, however, and the three stayed by a margin of four seconds. Pineau won the sprint for the stage, and took the red jersey as points classification leader with this result.

The squad was largely quiet for the remainder of the Giro. Weylandt took seventh in a more full field sprint in stage 9. In stage 11, when 50 riders formed the day's breakaway and the favorites lost more than 13 minutes, Cataldo nearly took the squad's third victory. He and Pineau had both made the selection, but only Cataldo stayed at the front of the race toward the stage's end. Unable to bridge up to an attacking Evgeni Petrov in the stage's final kilometer, Cataldo was second on the day. Pineau was third in the stage 12 group sprint, taking the red jersey again for two days with this result. Samoilau rode the Monte Grappa climb in stage 14 with the second group on the road, leading them across the finish line 2'25" back of stage winner Vincenzo Nibali, for sixth on the day. Cataldo was ninth-best in the climbing time trial to Plan de Corones two stages later. In stage 19, Samoilau again led his group across the line, this time the third group on the road, for ninth place. Samoilau was the squad's highest-placed rider in the final overall standings, in 39th place at a deficit of one hour and 46 minutes to Giro champion Ivan Basso. Pineau won the Premio della Fuga classification for most kilometers spent in a breakaway of ten or fewer riders. The squad was 15th in the Trofeo Fast Team standings and 13th in the Trofeo Super Team.

=== Tour de France ===
Boonen intended to start the Tour de France, but had to pull out with a knee injury exacerbated in the Tour de Suisse. Lefevere had hoped to replace Boonen with Weylandt, but the young sprinter was not on the 15-name list Lefevere had first submitted to Tour organizers ASO, so he was ineligible. Reda took Boonen's place at the Tour's start. The squad also included Chavanel, coming off a lackluster season to date which included a fractured skull sustained at Liège–Bastogne–Liège, and Pineau, coming off a strong Giro d'Italia which included a stage win. Seeldraeyers, best young rider at the 2009 Giro d'Italia, was the team's only general classification rider, but they did not expect him to be a serious contender.

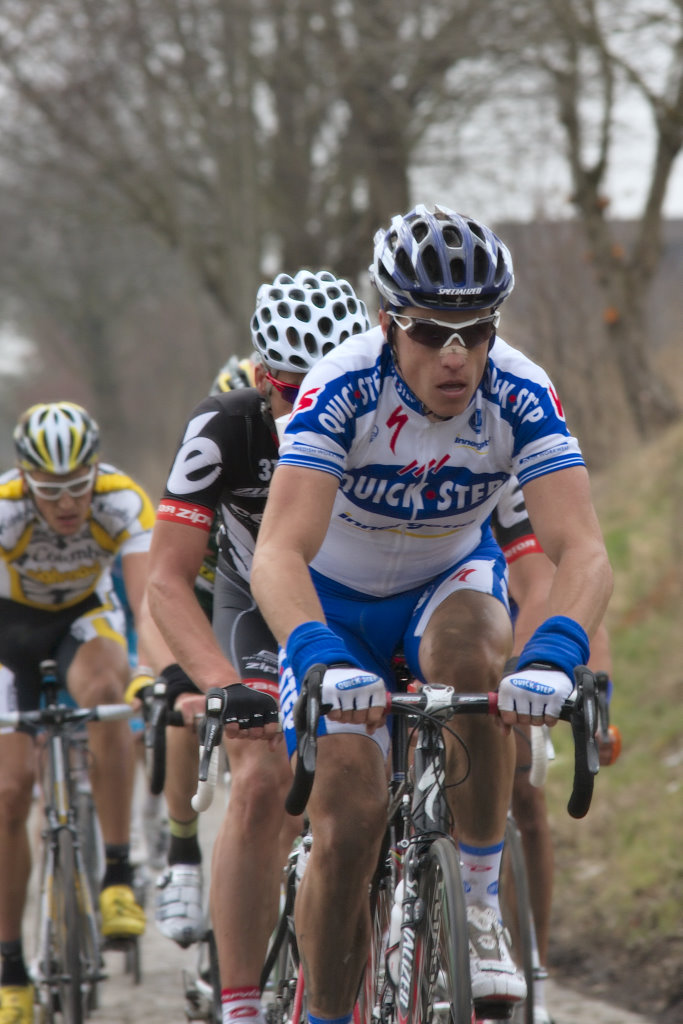
On two separate occasions in the Tour, Sylvain Chavanel won a stage and took the race leader's yellow jersey.

The team was very successful in stage 2, on a day when nearly every other team came away with riders nursing injuries. Chavanel made the morning breakaway and started a solo move for victory about 20 kilometers from the finish. Pineau had also made the breakaway and won the first four climbs, giving him the polka-dot jersey as leader of the mountains classification, before he pulled up and rejoined the peloton behind them. After Chavanel had attacked the leading group and gotten free, fellow breakaway rider Francesco Gavazzi crashed on the Col du Stockeu and set off a chain reaction of crashes that involved some 60 riders from just about every team in the race. Uninvolved and likely unaware, Chavanel rode to an uncontested stage win. Race leader Fabian Cancellara negotiated with Tour officials to neutralize the stage behind Chavanel, and there was no aggressive riding from the peloton for the final few kilometers of the race, and no sprint for second place. Chavanel's nearly four-minute gap over the peloton nonetheless stood, giving him the yellow jersey as well as the stage win. Points classification points for all but Chavanel were also negated, meaning the Frenchman also took the green jersey. The squad also took the lead in the teams classification with this result, making it a very successful day for them. Chavanel was unable to maintain the race lead the next day in stage 3, which due to its inclusion of several cobbled sectors was expected to be very difficult and crash-ridden. He and Pineau both finished in the sixth large group on the road, losing four minutes to the stage winner. He slipped to fifth overall with this result.

After the peloton finished together in the next three mass sprint stages, Chavanel found his form again in stage 7. He and Pineau again both made the morning breakaway, with Pineau winning the first five climbs of the day before pulling up. On the fifth climb, the Col de la Croix de la Serra, the two of them forced the pace such that the leading group was fractured. Chavanel again rode to the stage win and yellow jersey alone, with a gap of nearly a minute over Rafael Valls in second. While Chavanel had hoped to retain the jersey for several days after he first won it, he freely admitted after stage 7 that he was unlikely to hold it the next day in a stage that ended with a climb to Morzine-Avoriaz in the Alps. He indeed lost the jersey, finishing nearly 12 minutes back on the stage. Pineau lost the polka-dot jersey to Anthony Charteau after stage 9. The two had the same number of points, but Charteau held the tiebreaker for better placings on more difficult climbs. Pineau took it back after stage 10, out-climbing Charteau on the Côte de Laffrey, but lost it back for good after stage 12. In stage 16, Van de Walle and Barredo both made a nine-man breakaway, one which notably also included seven-time Tour champion Lance Armstrong, who had fallen well out of overall contention. Barredo tried a solo move from this group to get to the line first, but bonked well before the end of the stage, finishing 28 seconds back of the other eight at the finish. Van de Walle was seventh on the day. That was as close at the team came to any further victories. Their highest-placed rider in the final overall standings was De Weert, in 18th place at a deficit of just under 22 minutes to Tour champion Alberto Contador. For his part, Seeldraeyers was 134th, nearly three and a half hours off Contador's winning time. The squad finished seventh in the teams classification.

== Season victories ==
Date	Race	Competition	Rider	Country	Location
February 9	Tour of Qatar, Stage 3	UCI Asia Tour	Tom Boonen (BEL)	Qatar	Mesaieed
February 11	Tour of Qatar, Stage 5	UCI Asia Tour	Tom Boonen (BEL)	Qatar	Madinat Al Shamal
February 18	Tour of Oman, Stage 5	UCI Asia Tour	Tom Boonen (BEL)	Oman	Sultan Qaboos Sports Complex (Muscat)
March 11	Tirreno–Adriatico, Stage 2	UCI World Ranking	Tom Boonen (BEL)	Italy	Montecatini Terme
March 26	Volta a Catalunya, Stage 5	UCI ProTour	Davide Malacarne (ITA)	Spain	Cabacés
May 10	Giro d'Italia, Stage 3	UCI World Ranking	Wouter Weylandt (BEL)	Netherlands	Middelburg
May 13	Giro d'Italia, Stage 5	UCI World Ranking	Jérôme Pineau (FRA)	Italy	Novi Ligure
May 30	Giro d'Italia, Premio della Fuga	UCI World Ranking	Jérôme Pineau (FRA)	Italy	
May 30	Tour of Belgium, Overall	UCI Europe Tour	Stijn Devolder (BEL)	Belgium	
June 23	Halle–Ingooigem	UCI Europe Tour	Jurgen Van de Walle (BEL)	Belgium	Ingooigem
July 5	Tour de France, Stage 2	UCI World Ranking	Sylvain Chavanel (FRA)	Belgium	Spa
July 10	Tour de France, Stage 7	UCI World Ranking	Sylvain Chavanel (FRA)	France	Les Rousses
~~September 12~~	~~Vuelta a España, Stage 15~~	~~UCI World Ranking~~	~~Carlos Barredo (ESP)~~	~~Spain~~	~~Lagos de Covadonga~~
October 3	Circuit Franco-Belge, Stage 4	UCI Europe Tour	Wouter Weylandt (BEL)	Belgium	Tournai
October 10	G.P. Beghelli	UCI Europe Tour	Dario Cataldo (ITA)	Italy	Monteveglio

== National, Continental and World champions ==
Date	Discipline	Jersey	Rider	Country	Location
25 June	Belarusian National Time Trial Champion		Branislau Samoilau (BLR)	Belarus	
27 June	Belgian National Road Race Champion		Stijn Devolder (BEL)	Belgium	
15 August	Belgian National Time Trial Champion		Stijn Devolder (BEL)	Belgium	
