= 2011 Quick-Step season =

2011 Quick-Step season
Manager	Patrick Lefevere
One-day victories	4
Stage race overall victories	none
Stage race stage victories	1
Previous season • Next season

The 2011 season for Quick-Step began in January at the Tour Down Under and ended in October at the Giro di Lombardia. As a UCI ProTeam, they were automatically invited and obligated to send a squad to every event in the UCI World Tour.

With just five victories, the season was easily the worst in Quick Step's history. They were all but invisible at the Grand Tours other than a brief run in the leader's jersey for Sylvain Chavanel at the Vuelta a España. The same, bar Tom Boonen's Gent–Wevelgem win, was true of the classic cycle races. They were the last eligible team to score any points toward the UCI World Tour rankings, and finished third-from-last in those rankings, better only than Ag2r–La Mondiale and Vacansoleil–DCM.

During the season, the team announced that Omega Pharma would be rejoining them as a title sponsor for the 2012 season, as Omega Pharma–Quick-Step.

== 2011 roster ==
Ages as of January 1, 2011:

Rider	Date of birth
Marco Bandiera (ITA)	June 12, 1984 (aged 26)
Tom Boonen (BEL)	October 15, 1980 (aged 30)
Andy Cappelle (BEL)	April 30, 1979 (aged 31)
Dario Cataldo (ITA)	March 17, 1985 (aged 25)
Sylvain Chavanel (FRA)	June 30, 1979 (aged 31)
Francesco Chicchi (ITA)	November 27, 1980 (aged 30)
Gerald Ciolek (GER)	September 16, 1986 (aged 24)
Marc de Maar (CUW)	February 15, 1984 (aged 26)
Kevin De Weert (BEL)	May 27, 1982 (aged 28)
Dries Devenyns (BEL)	July 22, 1983 (aged 27)
Addy Engels (NED)	June 16, 1977 (aged 33)
Mauro Facci (ITA)	May 11, 1982 (aged 28)
Iljo Keisse (BEL)	December 21, 1982 (aged 28)
Andrei Kunitski (BLR)	July 2, 1984 (aged 26)
Nikolas Maes (BEL)	April 9, 1986 (aged 24)

Rider	Date of birth
Davide Malacarne (ITA)	July 11, 1987 (aged 23)
Jérôme Pineau (FRA)	January 2, 1980 (aged 30)
Francesco Reda (ITA)	November 19, 1982 (aged 28)
Frederique Robert (BEL)	January 25, 1989 (aged 21)
Kevin Seeldraeyers (BEL)	September 12, 1986 (aged 24)
Andreas Stauff (GER)	January 22, 1987 (aged 23)
Gert Steegmans (BEL)	September 30, 1980 (aged 30)
Zdeněk Štybar (Note: Štybar joined the team on March 1.) (CZE)	December 11, 1985 (aged 25)
Niki Terpstra (NED)	May 18, 1984 (aged 26)
Ján Tratnik (SLO)	February 23, 1990 (aged 20)
Matteo Trentin (Note: Trentin joined the team on August 1 as a stagiaire.) (ITA)	August 2, 1989 (aged 21)
Kevin van Impe (BEL)	April 19, 1981 (aged 29)
Guillaume Van Keirsbulck (BEL)	February 14, 1991 (aged 19)
Kristof Vandewalle (BEL)	April 5, 1985 (aged 25)
Julien Vermote (BEL)	July 26, 1989 (aged 21)

Riders who joined the team for the 2011 season

Rider	2010 team
Marco Bandiera	Team Katusha
Andy Cappelle	Verandas Willems
Francesco Chicchi	Liquigas–Doimo
Gerald Ciolek	Team Milram
Marc de Maar	UnitedHealthcare–Maxxis
Frederique Robert	neo-pro (stagiaire: Quick-Step)
Gert Steegmans	Team RadioShack
Zdeněk Štybar	Telenet–Fidea
Jan Tratnik	Zheroquadro
Niki Terpstra	Team Milram
Kristof Vandewalle	Topsport Vlaanderen–Mercator
Guillaume Van Keirsbulck	neo-pro (stagiaire: Quick-Step)
Julien Vermote	neo-pro

Riders who left the team during or after the 2010 season

Rider	2011 team
Carlos Barredo	Rabobank
Stijn Devolder	Vacansoleil–DCM
Kurt Hovelijnck	Donckers Koffie–Jelly Belly
Kevin Hulsmans	Donckers Koffie–Jelly Belly
Thomas Kvist	Glud & Marstrand
Branislau Samoilau	Movistar Team
Matteo Tosatto	Saxo Bank–SunGard
Jurgen Van de Walle	Omega Pharma–Lotto
Marco Velo	Retired
Wouter Weylandt	Leopard Trek
Maarten Wynants	Rabobank

== One-day races ==
=== Spring classics ===
Steegmans won Nokere Koerse in March, from a field sprint. Quick Step had also featured in the day's primary breakaway, with Van Keirsbulck part of the leading group on the road for all but the last 20 km (12 mi). Going into the Belgian classics, Quick Step was last in the UCI World Tour standings, having not yet scored a single point. Team manager Lefevere said that it was too early to judge the team's season, and suggested they should be reassessed after Liège–Bastogne–Liège. Gent–Wevelgem was the first UCI World Tour race of the season held in Belgium. Chavanel figured into a four-man breakaway that took shape near the end of the race; so near, in fact, that team leader Boonen had begun to ride with the intention of leaving the chase group behind, so that Chavanel could conceivably ride for victory. Boonen had had mechanical trouble earlier in the race, but thanks to the efforts of Van Impe, he was able to chase back on. Despite Boonen's intentions of hindering the chase, the break was caught, with Team Sky's Ian Stannard the last man brought back. Steegmans began performing a leadout when Stannard was caught, and Boonen reacted essentially on instinct to sprint for the win. He came first, ahead of Daniele Bennati and Tyler Farrar, a result which surprised him given that he has not targeted Gent–Wevelgem in recent seasons. The result moved Quick Step from 18th (last) place up to 14th in the UCI standings.

Boonen was frequently mentioned as a favorite at the monument classic the Tour of Flanders. Boonen neutralized a move by BMC Racing Team's Greg Van Avermaet early in the race and later put in an attack of his own, but found himself marked as well. He and Filippo Pozzato tried to follow Fabian Cancellara's accelerations on the Leberg, the day's fourteenth cobbled climb, but soon found themselves gapped off. A short while beforehand, teammate Chavanel had attacked and gotten clear of the main field, bridging up to the leaders on the road. This left him in effective position for the remainder of the race to stay with Cancellara and other favorites, since he did not have as far to go to mark their attacks. He was able to stay with the front of the race when Cancellara, Philippe Gilbert, Alessandro Ballan, and Bjorn Leukemans formed the day's final selection. Boonen and a handful of others chased back on after a while. Cancellara put in a second acceleration on the Bosberg, the eighteenth and final cobbled climb on the day's profile, and only Chavanel and Nick Nuyens could follow. Chavanel tried his luck in the three-man sprint for victory, but lost out to Nuyens at the finish, taking second place. Post-race analysis praised Chavanel for effectively anticipating the hyper-aggressive finale with his own attack on the Molenberg, though Chavanel himself remarked after the race ended that he perhaps should have worked for Boonen in the finale since Boonen is by far the better sprinter. Boonen finished the race fourth, two seconds behind the leading trio. Boonen and Chavanel both drew mention as favorites at the third monument, Paris–Roubaix. Both, however, had difficult rides, suffering repeated crashes. Boonen had his chain slip and get stuck between the frame and crankset of his bicycle, a problem which required a full bike change. He had to wait for several minutes for his team car to arrive and assist him. He was nearly able to chase back on to the group of favorites when his water bottle fell from its position on his bicycle and became stuck between his back wheel and frame. At that point, he crashed with former teammate Maarten Wynants and landed on his knees, sustaining such an injury that he was unable to continue in the race. Boonen remarked after the race that he had never before so much as flatted in Paris–Roubaix, and had only fallen from his bicycle on two occasions. Chavanel, for his part, flatted twice, both at moments when his group was racing at a high speed, meaning it was hard for him to chase back on. He finished the race a distant 38th, nearly five minutes down on the winner. Sporting director Wilfried Peeters said after the race that he had never seen such bad luck.

The team also sent squads to the Trofeo Cala Millor, Trofeo Inca, the Kuurne–Brussels–Kuurne, Milan–San Remo, E3 Prijs Vlaanderen – Harelbeke, the Amstel Gold Race, La Flèche Wallonne, and Liège–Bastogne–Liège, but placed no higher than 11th in any of these races.

=== Fall races ===
The team also sent squads to the GP Ouest-France, the Memorial Rik Van Steenbergen, Paris–Brussels, the Grand Prix Cycliste de Montréal, the Grand Prix de Wallonie, the Kampioenschap van Vlaanderen, Binche–Tournai–Binche, Paris–Tours and the Giro di Lombardia, but finished no higher than 11th in any of these races.

== Stage races ==
Just as in the last several years, Boonen opened his season at the Tour of Qatar. He was immediately effective, winning the first road race stage ahead of perennial Qatar rival Heinrich Haussler. It was his 18th career Tour of Qatar stage win, and thanks to a solid prologue time trial, Boonen took the overall race leadership. In stage 3, Boonen flatted at a critical moment when the peloton was at its top speed and lost three minutes to stage winner Huassler, losing any chance to win the race for a fourth time. Boonen contested the sprint to stage 4, finishing third, but he did not figure into the Tour's final stage, ceding a minute and 30 seconds to the leading group to finish 14th overall. Maes won the Tour's youth classification by over three minutes ahead of that classification's defending champion Roger Kluge. At Tirreno–Adriatico, second-year pro Malacarne figured into an all-day breakaway in stage 5. While he and Andrey Amador rode the stage's final kilometers in an unstrategic fashion, allowing the chase pack to catch them, Malacarne's efforts did not go unrewarded. He took the majority of the climbing points on offer for the day, and held the jersey through the race's conclusion two days later. Highly touted mid-year acquisition and world cyclo-cross champion Štybar had his first race with the team at the Four Days of Dunkirk. Despite very limited road experience, Štybar showed quite well, coming third on the race's hardest stage and finishing in that same position on the final podium. Štybar said he was pleasantly surprised by the result, since he expected to suffer badly in the queen stage which had 2,600 m (8,500 ft) of vertical climbing.

The team also sent squads to the Tour Down Under, the Tour of Oman, Volta ao Algarve, Driedaagse van West-Vlaanderen, Paris–Nice, Volta a Catalunya, the Three Days of De Panne, the Tour of the Basque Country, the Tour de Romandie, the Tour de Picardie, the Tour of Belgium, the Critérium du Dauphiné, the Tour de Suisse, the Tour de Wallonie, the Tour de Pologne, the Eneco Tour, the Tour de Wallonie-Picarde and the Tour of Beijing, but did not achieve a stage win, classification win, or podium finish in any of them.

== Season victories ==
Date	Race	Competition	Rider	Country	Location
February 7	Tour of Qatar, Stage 1	UCI Asia Tour	Tom Boonen (BEL)	Qatar	Al Khor Corniche
February 11	Tour of Qatar, Young rider classification	UCI Asia Tour	Nikolas Maes (BEL)	Qatar	
March 15	Tirreno–Adriatico, Mountains classification	UCI World Tour	Davide Malacarne (ITA)	Italy	
March 16	Nokere Koerse	UCI Europe Tour	Gert Steegmans (BEL)	Belgium	Nokere
March 27	Gent–Wevelgem	UCI World Tour	Tom Boonen (BEL)	Belgium	Wevelgem
May 29	Giro d'Italia, Fair Play Teams classification	UCI World Tour	(Note: Six-way tie with Androni Giocattoli, HTC–Highroad, Liquigas–Cannondale, BMC Racing Team, and Colnago–CSF Inox)	Italy	
September 4	Grote Prijs Jef Scherens	UCI Europe Tour	Jérôme Pineau (FRA)	Belgium	Leuven
September 21	Omloop van het Houtland	UCI Europe Tour	Guillaume Van Keirsbulck (BEL)	Belgium	Lichtervelde
