= 2008 Grote Prijs Jef Scherens =

Race details
- Dates: 7 September 2008
- Stages: 1
- Distance: 183.3 km (113.9 mi)
- Winning time: 4h 30' 00"

Results
	Winner	Wouter Mol (NED)
	Second	Janek Tombak (EST)
	Third	Kurt Hovelijnck (BEL)

The 2008 Grote Prijs Jef Scherens was the 42nd edition of the Grote Prijs Jef Scherens cycle race and was held on 7 September 2008. The race started and finished in Leuven. The race was won by Wouter Mol.

== General classification ==
Final general classification

Rank	Rider	Time
1	Wouter Mol (NED)	4h 30' 00"
2	Janek Tombak (EST)	+ 0"
3	Kurt Hovelijnck (BEL)	+ 0"
4	Bert De Waele (BEL)	+ 0"
5	Joost van Leijen (NED)	+ 0"
6	Tom Criel (BEL)	+ 0"
7	Geert Steurs (BEL)	+ 0"
8	Sven Nevens (BEL)	+ 35"
9	Lieuwe Westra (NED)	+ 45"
10	Jürgen Roelandts (BEL)	+ 1' 55"
