= 2007 Tour of Qatar =

Cycling race

The 2007 Tour of Qatar was held from 28 January to 2 February 2007 in Qatar. It was a multiple stage road cycling race that took part over six stages with a total of 715.5 kilometres and is part of the 2006–2007 UCI Asia Tour.

== Stage summary ==
Stage	Date	Start	Finish	Distance	Stage Top 3	Leading Top 3	Time
1	28 January	Doha Corniche	Doha Corniche	6 km	Quick-Step–Innergetic; Team Milram; Liquigas	(Netherlands) Steven de Jongh (Belgium) Wilfried Cretskens (Belgium) Tom Boonen	6:33 + 0:00 + 0:00
2	29 January	Al Wakra	Qatar Olympic Committee	135.5 km	(Belgium) Tom Boonen (Italy) Alessandro Petacchi (France) Jean-Patrick Nazon	(Belgium) Tom Boonen (Netherlands) Steven de Jongh (Belgium) Gert Steegmans	3:08:13 + 0:07 + 0:08
3	30 January	Dohat Salwa	Khalifa Stadium	140 km	(Belgium) Tom Boonen (Italy) Alessandro Petacchi (Austria) Bernhard Eisel	(Belgium) Tom Boonen (Italy) Alessandro Petacchi (Netherlands) Steven de Jongh	6:33.09 + 0:13 + 0:17
4	31 January	Camel Race Track	Doha Golf Club	139.5 km	(Belgium) Tom Boonen (Australia) Graeme Brown (Brazil) Murilo Fischer	(Belgium) Tom Boonen (Netherlands) Steven de Jongh (Austria) Bernhard Eisel	9:27.52 + 0:27 + 0:33
5	1 February	Al Zubarah	Mesaieed	160.5 km	(Belgium) Greg Van Avermaet (Germany) Marcel Sieberg (France) Stéphane Poulhies	(Belgium) Wilfried Cretskens (Belgium) Tom Boonen (Netherlands) Steven de Jongh	12:54:41 + 2:19 + 2:44
6	2 February	Sealine Beach Resort	Doha Corniche	134 km	(Belgium) Tom Boonen (Italy) Alessandro Petacchi (Australia) Graeme Brown	(Belgium) Wilfried Cretskens (Belgium) Tom Boonen (Netherlands) Steven de Jongh	15:50:58 + 2:09 + 2:44

== Other leading top threes ==
Stage	Sprints	Pts	Under 23	Time	Teams	Time
1	no sprints	none	(Germany) Marcel Sieberg (Italy) Francesco Failli (Belgium) Wim De Vocht	6:38 + 0:02 + 0:04	Quick-Step–Innergetic; Team Milram; Liquigas	6:33 + 0:05 + 0:07
2	(Belgium) Tom Boonen (Italy) Alessandro Petacchi (France) Jean-Patrick Nazon	30; 27; 25	(Germany) Marcel Sieberg (Italy) Francesco Failli (Belgium) Nick Ingels	3:08:28 + 0:02 + 0:04	Quick-Step–Innergetic; Team Milram; Liquigas	9:12:03 + 0:05 + 0:07
3	(Belgium) Tom Boonen (Italy) Alessandro Petacchi (Switzerland) Aurélien Clerc	60; 54; 42	(Belgium) Nick Ingels (France) Lloyd Mondory (Italy) Francesco Failli	6:33:38 + 0:02 + 0:03	Quick-Step–Innergetic; Predictor–Lotto; Team Milram	19:27:26 + 0:04 + 0:05
4	(Belgium) Tom Boonen (Italy) Alessandro Petacchi (Austria) Bernhard Eisel	91; 54; 47	(France) Lloyd Mondory (Spain) Francisco Ventoso (France) Alexandre Pichot	9:28:29 + 0:08 + 0:15	Quick-Step–Innergetic; T-Mobile Team; Rabobank	28:12:08 + 0:06 + 0:19
5	(Belgium) Tom Boonen (Italy) Alessandro Petacchi (Austria) Bernhard Eisel	92; 54; 51	(France) Alexandre Pichot (France) Lloyd Mondory (Spain) Francisco Ventoso	12:57:52 + 0:53 + 0:58	Quick-Step–Innergetic; T-Mobile Team; Rabobank	38:36:35 + 0:06 + 4:31
6	(Belgium) Tom Boonen (Italy) Alessandro Petacchi (France) Lloyd Mondory	122; 81; 60	(France) Alexandre Pichot (France) Lloyd Mondory (Spain) Francisco Ventoso	15:54:09 + 0:53 + 0:58	Quick-Step–Innergetic; T-Mobile Team; Rabobank	47:25:26 + 0:06 + 4:31

=== Men's top 10 overall ===
Pos	Rider	Time
1	(Belgium) Wilfried Cretskens	15:50:58
2	(Belgium) Tom Boonen	+ 2:09
3	(Netherlands) Steven de Jongh	+ 2:44
4	(Austria) Bernhard Eisel	+ 2:52
5	(New Zealand) Greg Henderson	+ 3:01
6	(Germany) Andreas Klier	+ 3:08
7	(Belgium) Leif Hoste	+ 3:09
8	(France) Alexandre Pichot	+ 3:11
9	(Australia) Mathew Hayman	+ 3:30
10	(Netherlands) Servais Knaven	+ 3:44
