= 2010 Tour of Qatar =

Race details
- Dates: 7–12 February
- Stages: 6
- Distance: 704 km (437 mi)
- Winning time: 15h 55' 17"

Results
| Jersey awarded to the overall winner | Winner | Wouter Mol (NED) | (Vacansoleil) |
| | Second | Geert Steurs (BEL) | (Topsport Vlaanderen–Mercator) |
| | Third | Tom Boonen (BEL) | (Quick-Step) |
| Jersey awarded to the points classification winner | Points | Heinrich Haussler (GER) | (Cervélo TestTeam) |
| Jersey awarded to the young rider classification winner | Young rider | Roger Kluge (GER) | (Team Milram) |
| | Team | Cervélo TestTeam | |

The 2010 Tour of Qatar was the ninth edition of the Tour of Qatar cycling stage race. It was rated as a 2.1 event on the UCI Asia Tour, and was held from 7 February to 12 February 2010, in Qatar. The race was won by Wouter Mol of Vacansoleil.

== Teams ==
Sixteen teams competed in the 2010 Tour of Qatar. These included ten UCI ProTour teams, five UCI Professional Continental teams, and one Continental team. Each team entered a squad of eight riders, giving the Tour a peloton of 128 riders.

The teams participating in the race were:

- Ag2r–La Mondiale
- BMC Racing Team
- Cervélo TestTeam
- Garmin–Transitions
- Liquigas–Doimo
- Omega Pharma–Lotto
- Quick-Step
- Saur–Sojasun
- Team HTC–Columbia
- Team Katusha
- Team Milram
- Team Saxo Bank
- Team Sky
- Trek-Livestrong U23
- Topsport Vlaanderen–Mercator
- Vacansoleil

The same sixteen teams contested the inaugural Tour of Oman, which began on February 14. The teams' squads were expected to be similar for both events, with the individual time trial which closes out the Tour of Oman providing for the only minor changes.

== Stages ==
=== Stage 1 ===
7 February 2010 – West Bay Lagoon, 8.2 km (5.1 mi) (team time trial)

With time trial specialist Bradley Wiggins pulling them most of the way, Team Sky won the opening stage team time trial with a time of 9' 41", and an average speed of over 50 km/h (31 mph), and over 70 km/h (43 mph) on the closing section which featured a pronounced tailwind. Edvald Boasson Hagen was the first member of the team to cross the line, giving him the golden jersey. Defending Tour champion Tom Boonen's Quick-Step team was fifth, putting him 20 seconds off the race lead.

The second place team was Garmin–Transitions, after the disqualification of Cervélo TestTeam. The TestTeam was penalized a minute due to Heinrich Haussler pushing Gabriel Rasch after taking a turn on the front. The team protested the penalty, denying that the push was meant to gain any competitive advantage, with Haussler saying that it instead was to help Rasch avoid crashing. The penalty was upheld, and pre-race contender Haussler was placed over a minute off the race lead. The team's sporting director considered withdrawing them from the race because of the penalty, but decided against it.

Stage 1 results

| | Team | Time |
|---|---|---|
| 1 | Team Sky | 9' 41" |
| 2 | Garmin–Transitions | + 8" |
| 3 | Team Saxo Bank | + 13" |
| 4 | Team HTC–Columbia | + 18" |
| 5 | Quick-Step | + 20" |
| 6 | Saur–Sojasun | + 21" |
| 7 | Liquigas–Doimo | + 21" |
| 8 | BMC Racing Team | + 21" |
| 9 | Vacansoleil | + 22" |
| 10 | Team Milram | + 25" |

General Classification after Stage 1

| | Cyclist | Team | Time |
|---|---|---|---|
| 1 | Edvald Boasson Hagen (NOR) | Team Sky | 9′ 41″ |
| 2 | Juan Antonio Flecha (ESP) | Team Sky | s.t. |
| 3 | Bradley Wiggins (GBR) | Team Sky | s.t. |
| 4 | Geraint Thomas (GBR) | Team Sky | s.t. |
| 5 | Lars Petter Nordhaug (NOR) | Team Sky | s.t. |
| 6 | Russell Downing (GBR) | Team Sky | + 2″ |
| 7 | Tyler Farrar (USA) | Garmin–Transitions | + 8″ |
| 8 | Martijn Maaskant (NED) | Garmin–Transitions | s.t. |
| 9 | Murilo Fischer (BRA) | Garmin–Transitions | s.t. |
| 10 | Svein Tuft (CAN) | Garmin–Transitions | s.t. |

=== Stage 2 ===
8 February 2010 – Camel Race Track to Qatar Foundation, 147 km (91 mi)

Almost straight away, when racing got underway, a group of two, Geert Steurs and Wouter Mol attacked and immediately got a few minutes over the peloton. As the race went on, they increased their advantage to well over 12 minutes.

However the peloton was not content to this breakaway. As a result, a group of favourites, which featured Tom Boonen from Quick-Step, Tyler Farrar from Garmin–Transitions, Cervélo TestTeam's fast man Heinrich Haussler were among about fifteen more riders, that were up the front when the split happened and formed a small chasing group. Golden jersey holder Edvald Boasson Hagen missed out on the breakaways and with approximately 40 km to go suffered a punctured tire which put him 11 minutes behind the lead group of riders.

Heading into the final kilometer, the lead group held 2 and a half minute advantage and it was Steurs who won the stage, but with Mol becoming the overall leader.

Stage 2 results

| | Cyclist | Team | Time |
|---|---|---|---|
| 1 | Geert Steurs (BEL) | Topsport Vlaanderen–Mercator | 3h 31' 00" |
| 2 | Wouter Mol (NED) | Vacansoleil | s.t. |
| 3 | Roger Kluge (GER) | Team Milram | + 1' 51" |
| 4 | Heinrich Haussler (GER) | Cervélo TestTeam | + 1' 54" |
| 5 | Philippe Gilbert (BEL) | Omega Pharma–Lotto | + 1' 55" |
| 6 | Roger Hammond (GBR) | Cervélo TestTeam | + 1' 55" |
| 7 | Tom Boonen (BEL) | Quick-Step | + 1' 55" |
| 8 | Jeremy Hunt (GBR) | Cervélo TestTeam | + 1' 55" |
| 9 | Danilo Napolitano (ITA) | Team Katusha | + 1' 55" |
| 10 | Marcus Burghardt (GER) | BMC Racing Team | + 1' 55" |

General Classification after Stage 2

| | Cyclist | Team | Time |
|---|---|---|---|
| 1 | Wouter Mol (NED) | Vacansoleil | 3h 40′ 51″ |
| 2 | Geert Steurs (BEL) | Topsport Vlaanderen–Mercator | + 9" |
| 3 | Roger Kluge (GER) | Team Milram | + 2' 02" |
| 4 | Tom Boonen (BEL) | Quick-Step | + 2' 05" |
| 5 | Marcus Burghardt (GER) | BMC Racing Team | + 2' 06" |
| 6 | Philippe Gilbert (BEL) | Omega Pharma–Lotto | + 2' 18″ |
| 7 | Danilo Napolitano (ITA) | Team Katusha | + 2' 18″ |
| 8 | Stuart O'Grady (AUS) | Team Saxo Bank | + 2' 40" |
| 9 | Tyler Farrar (USA) | Garmin–Transitions | + 2' 41" |
| 10 | Marco Velo (ITA) | Quick-Step | + 2' 47" |

=== Stage 3 ===
9 February 2010 – Dukhan to Mesaieed, 136.5 km (84.8 mi)

Tom Boonen won his 16th career stage at the Tour of Qatar. The two-time defending champion began his sprint with 200 m (660 ft) to go from the finish line and with the help of teammate Andreas Stauff and was clocked at going 72.8 km/h (45.2 mph) at the finish line to outsprint Cervélo TestTeam's Heinrich Haussler.

It was the first time in the Tour of Qatar's history where a stage started from the city of Dukhan in the west of the country. Unlike the previous days, the wind dropped and was favourable for almost the whole course.

Like the previous day, within 2 km (1.2 mi) a breakaway occurred. The biggest lead they had over the peloton was 55 seconds, and they were caught a mere 23 km (14 mi) from the start.

At the 60 km (37 mi) mark, another group of riders broke away and they managed to get a 2:30 lead on the peloton. At that point, Cervélo TestTeam and Garmin–Transitions took the role of reeling the breakaway group back in, which they caught at the 107 km (66 mi) mark.

Stage 3 results

| | Cyclist | Team | Time |
|---|---|---|---|
| 1 | Tom Boonen (BEL) | Quick-Step | 3h 01' 39" |
| 2 | Heinrich Haussler (GER) | Cervélo TestTeam | s.t. |
| 3 | Baden Cooke (AUS) | Team Saxo Bank | s.t. |
| 4 | Kenny Dehaes (BEL) | Omega Pharma–Lotto | s.t. |
| 5 | Daniele Bennati (ITA) | Liquigas–Doimo | s.t. |
| 6 | Peter Wrolich (AUT) | Team Milram | s.t. |
| 7 | Taylor Phinney (USA) | Trek Livestrong U23 | s.t. |
| 8 | Bobbie Traksel (NED) | Vacansoleil | s.t. |
| 9 | Tyler Farrar (USA) | Garmin–Transitions | s.t. |
| 10 | Philippe Gilbert (BEL) | Omega Pharma–Lotto | s.t. |

General Classification after Stage 3

| | Cyclist | Team | Time |
|---|---|---|---|
| 1 | Wouter Mol (NED) | Vacansoleil | 6h 42′ 30″ |
| 2 | Geert Steurs (BEL) | Topsport Vlaanderen–Mercator | + 9" |
| 3 | Tom Boonen (BEL) | Quick-Step | + 1' 55" |
| 4 | Roger Kluge (GER) | Team Milram | + 1' 59" |
| 5 | Marcus Burghardt (GER) | BMC Racing Team | + 2' 05" |
| 6 | Danilo Napolitano (ITA) | Team Katusha | + 2' 15″ |
| 7 | Philippe Gilbert (BEL) | Omega Pharma–Lotto | + 2' 17″ |
| 8 | Stuart O'Grady (AUS) | Team Saxo Bank | + 2' 40" |
| 9 | Tyler Farrar (USA) | Garmin–Transitions | + 2' 41" |
| 10 | Heinrich Haussler (GER) | Cervélo TestTeam | + 2' 43" |

=== Stage 4 ===
10 February 2010 – The Pearl to Al Khor Corniche, 146.5 km (91.0 mi)

It was Italian Francesco Chicchi claiming a final sprint to the line with Heinrich Haussler coming in second, and Juan José Haedo arriving third.

Like the previous stages, breakaways occurred and most were quickly reeled in. Sep Vanmarcke from Vacansoleil made a break from the peloton and was away for much of the stage. At the 40 km (25 mi) to go mark, the gap was just below two minutes as Vacansoleil was contributing the majority of the pace setting preserving the leader's golden jersey for Wouter Mol. For the next 15 km (9.3 mi), the gap hovered around the 1 minute and 45 second mark with the sprinters teams holding back on making a move until later in the stage.

The catch occurred with about 6 km (3.7 mi) to go, with Team Saxo Bank doing the pacing. Team HTC–Columbia and Team Sky moved to the front with 2 km (1.2 mi) to go. In the final kilometer the peloton was strung out in a long line and the pace was that high that a small split occurred.

With 400 m (1,300 ft) to go it was Theo Bos leading out the sprint to the line, trying to deliver Haussler first. Haussler had missed Bos' wheel, though, and with their teammate Roger Hammond directing Bos to continue his leadout, Haussler's chance at victory was quickly gone. Chicchi made his winning move peeling out and got into the clear. No one could match his blistering pace and he crossed the line three bike lengths ahead of Haussler in second.

Stage 4 results

| | Cyclist | Team | Time |
|---|---|---|---|
| 1 | Francesco Chicchi (ITA) | Liquigas–Doimo | 3h 16' 58" |
| 2 | Heinrich Haussler (GER) | Cervélo TestTeam | s.t. |
| 3 | Juan Jose Haedo (ARG) | Team Saxo Bank | s.t. |
| 4 | Theo Bos (NED) | Cervélo TestTeam | s.t. |
| 5 | Kenny Dehaes (BEL) | Omega Pharma–Lotto | s.t. |
| 6 | Roger Kluge (GER) | Team Milram | s.t. |
| 7 | Kristof Goddaert (BEL) | Ag2r–La Mondiale | s.t. |
| 8 | Taylor Phinney (USA) | Trek Livestrong U23 | s.t. |
| 9 | Danilo Napolitano (ITA) | Team Katusha | s.t. |
| 10 | Baden Cooke (AUS) | Team Saxo Bank | s.t. |

General Classification after Stage 4

| | Cyclist | Team | Time |
|---|---|---|---|
| 1 | Wouter Mol (NED) | Vacansoleil | 9h 59′ 28″ |
| 2 | Geert Steurs (BEL) | Topsport Vlaanderen–Mercator | + 9" |
| 3 | Tom Boonen (BEL) | Quick-Step | + 1' 55" |
| 4 | Roger Kluge (GER) | Team Milram | + 1' 59" |
| 5 | Marcus Burghardt (GER) | BMC Racing Team | + 2' 05" |
| 6 | Danilo Napolitano (ITA) | Team Katusha | + 2' 15″ |
| 7 | Philippe Gilbert (BEL) | Omega Pharma–Lotto | + 2' 17″ |
| 8 | Heinrich Haussler (GER) | Cervélo TestTeam | + 2' 37" |
| 9 | Francesco Chicchi (ITA) | Liquigas–Doimo | + 2' 38" |
| 10 | Stuart O'Grady (AUS) | Team Saxo Bank | + 2' 40" |

=== Stage 5 ===
11 February 2010 – Lusail to Madinat Al Shamal, 142 km (88 mi)

Stage 5 came down to a sprint and for the second time in the Tour it was Tom Boonen claiming victory at the finish line. It was his 17th career stage win at the Tour of Qatar. While the victory gave him ten bonus seconds, the Belgian speedster still stood almost two minutes behind race leader Wouter Mol at day's end.

Again, a breakaway occurred which consisted of six riders and but they were captured with 27 km (17 mi) to go. A group of notables got away from the main peloton in a counterattack – this group consisted of the overall leader, Mol, the youth leader, Roger Kluge, Fabian Cancellara, and sprinters Boonen, Tyler Farrar, Heinrich Haussler, Juan José Haedo, and Daniele Bennati. The peloton never allowed them to get too far ahead and were eventually reeled in.

The stage victory for Boonen put him within 8 points of Haussler for the points classification silver jersey.

Stage 5 results

| | Cyclist | Team | Time |
|---|---|---|---|
| 1 | Tom Boonen (BEL) | Quick-Step | 3h 13' 00" |
| 2 | Danilo Napolitano (ITA) | Team Katusha | s.t. |
| 3 | Edvald Boasson Hagen (NOR) | Team Sky | s.t. |
| 4 | Theo Bos (NED) | Cervélo TestTeam | s.t. |
| 5 | Juan Jose Haedo (ARG) | Team Saxo Bank | s.t. |
| 6 | Peter Wrolich (AUS) | Team Milram | s.t. |
| 7 | Francesco Chicchi (ITA) | Liquigas–Doimo | s.t. |
| 8 | Heinrich Haussler (GER) | Cervélo TestTeam | s.t. |
| 9 | Bernhard Eisel (AUS) | Team HTC–Columbia | s.t. |
| 10 | Tyler Farrar (USA) | Garmin–Transitions | s.t. |

General Classification after Stage 5

| | Cyclist | Team | Time |
|---|---|---|---|
| 1 | Wouter Mol (NED) | Vacansoleil | 13h 12′ 28″ |
| 2 | Geert Steurs (BEL) | Topsport Vlaanderen–Mercator | + 9" |
| 3 | Tom Boonen (BEL) | Quick-Step | + 1' 45" |
| 4 | Roger Kluge (GER) | Team Milram | + 1' 59" |
| 5 | Marcus Burghardt (GER) | BMC Racing Team | + 2' 05" |
| 6 | Danilo Napolitano (ITA) | Team Katusha | + 2' 09″ |
| 7 | Philippe Gilbert (BEL) | Omega Pharma–Lotto | + 2' 17″ |
| 8 | Heinrich Haussler (GER) | Cervélo TestTeam | + 2' 37" |
| 9 | Francesco Chicchi (ITA) | Liquigas–Doimo | + 2' 38" |
| 10 | Stuart O'Grady (AUS) | Team Saxo Bank | + 2' 40" |

=== Stage 6 ===
12 February 2010 – Al Wakra to Doha Corniche, 123.5 km (76.7 mi)

Stage 6 results

| | Cyclist | Team | Time |
|---|---|---|---|
| 1 | Francesco Chicchi (ITA) | Liquigas–Doimo | 2h 42' 49" |
| 2 | Tyler Farrar (USA) | Garmin–Transitions | s.t. |
| 3 | Juan José Haedo (ARG) | Team Saxo Bank | s.t. |
| 4 | Matthew Goss (AUS) | Team HTC–Columbia | s.t. |
| 5 | Jimmy Casper (FRA) | Saur–Sojasun | s.t. |
| 6 | Edvald Boasson Hagen (NOR) | Team Sky | s.t. |
| 7 | Tom Boonen (BEL) | Quick-Step | s.t. |
| 8 | Roger Kluge (GER) | Team Milram | s.t. |
| 9 | Heinrich Haussler (GER) | Cervélo TestTeam | s.t. |
| 10 | John Murphy (USA) | BMC Racing Team | s.t. |

Final General Classification

| | Cyclist | Team | Time |
|---|---|---|---|
| 1 | Wouter Mol (NED) | Vacansoleil | 15h 55′ 17″ |
| 2 | Geert Steurs (BEL) | Topsport Vlaanderen–Mercator | + 37" |
| 3 | Tom Boonen (BEL) | Quick-Step | + 1' 45" |
| 4 | Roger Kluge (GER) | Team Milram | + 1' 59" |
| 5 | Marcus Burghardt (GER) | BMC Racing Team | + 2' 05" |
| 6 | Danilo Napolitano (ITA) | Team Katusha | + 2' 09″ |
| 7 | Philippe Gilbert (BEL) | Omega Pharma–Lotto | + 2' 17″ |
| 8 | Francesco Chicchi (ITA) | Liquigas–Doimo | + 2' 28" |
| 9 | Heinrich Haussler (GER) | Cervélo TestTeam | + 2' 37" |
| 10 | Stuart O'Grady (AUS) | Team Saxo Bank | + 2' 40" |

== Classification leadership ==
In the 2010 Tour of Qatar, three different jerseys are awarded. For the general classification, calculated by adding each cyclist's finishing times on each stage, and allowing time bonuses for the first three finishers on each stage and in intermediate sprints, the leader receives a golden jersey. This classification is considered the most important of the Tour of Qatar, and the winner is considered the winner of the Tour.

Additionally, there is a points classification, which awards a silver jersey. In the points classification, cyclists get points for finishing in the top three in an intermediate sprint or the top twenty of a stage. The first in an intermediate sprint gets 3 points, second 2, and third a single point. The stage win affords 30 points, second is worth 27 points, 25 for third, 23 for fourth, 21 for fifth, 19 for sixth, 17 for seventh, 15 for eighth, 13 for ninth, 11 for tenth, and one point less per place down the line, to a single point for twentieth.

There is also a youth classification, which awards a blue jersey. This classification is calculated the same as the general classification, but only riders born on or after January 1, 1985, are eligible.

The race also awards a teams classification, which is not represented by a jersey. The teams classification is calculated by adding the times of each team's best three riders per stage per day.

| Stage | Winner | General Classification | Points Classification | Young Rider Classification | Teams Classification |
|---|---|---|---|---|---|
| 1 | Team Sky | Edvald Boasson Hagen | not awarded | Edvald Boasson Hagen | Team Sky |
| 2 | Geert Steurs | Wouter Mol | Geert Steurs | Roger Kluge | Topsport Vlaanderen–Mercator |
| 3 | Tom Boonen | Wouter Mol | Heinrich Haussler | Roger Kluge | Topsport Vlaanderen–Mercator |
| 4 | Francesco Chicchi | Wouter Mol | Heinrich Haussler | Roger Kluge | Topsport Vlaanderen–Mercator |
| 5 | Tom Boonen | Wouter Mol | Heinrich Haussler | Roger Kluge | Topsport Vlaanderen–Mercator |
| 6 | Francesco Chicchi | Wouter Mol | Heinrich Haussler | Roger Kluge | Cervélo TestTeam |
| Final | | Wouter Mol | Heinrich Haussler | Roger Kluge | Cervélo TestTeam |

== Final standings ==
=== General classification ===
| | Rider | Team | Time |
|---|---|---|---|
| 1 | Wouter Mol (NED) | Vacansoleil | 15h 55′ 17″ |
| 2 | Geert Steurs (BEL) | Topsport Vlaanderen–Mercator | + 35" |
| 3 | Tom Boonen (BEL) | Quick-Step | + 1' 45" |
| 4 | Roger Kluge (GER) | Team Milram | + 1' 59" |
| 5 | Marcus Burghardt (GER) | BMC Racing Team | + 2' 05" |
| 6 | Danilo Napolitano (ITA) | Team Katusha | + 2' 09″ |
| 7 | Philippe Gilbert (BEL) | Omega Pharma–Lotto | + 2' 17″ |
| 8 | Francesco Chicchi (ITA) | Liquigas–Doimo | + 2' 28" |
| 9 | Heinrich Haussler (GER) | Cervélo TestTeam | + 2' 37" |
| 10 | Stuart O'Grady (AUS) | Team Saxo Bank | + 2' 40" |

=== Points classification ===
| | Rider | Team | Points |
|---|---|---|---|
| 1 | Heinrich Haussler (GER) | Cervélo TestTeam | 108 |
| 2 | Tom Boonen (BEL) | Quick-Step | 104 |
| 3 | Francesco Chicchi (ITA) | Liquigas–Doimo | 82 |
| 4 | Juan Jose Haedo (ARG) | Team Saxo Bank | 80 |
| 5 | Danilo Napolitano (ITA) | Team Katusha | 65 |
| 6 | Roger Kluge (GER) | Team Milram | 62 |
| 7 | Kenny Dehaes (BEL) | Omega Pharma–Lotto | 52 |
| 8 | Tyler Farrar (USA) | Garmin–Transitions | 51 |
| 9 | Edvald Boasson Hagen (NOR) | Team Sky | 48 |
| 10 | Theo Bos (NED) | Cervélo TestTeam | 46 |

=== Young riders' classification ===
| | Rider | Team | Points |
|---|---|---|---|
| 1 | Roger Kluge (GER) | Team Milram | 15h 57' 16" |
| 2 | Klaas Lodewyck (BEL) | Topsport Vlaanderen–Mercator | + 1' 01" |
| 3 | Nikolay Trusov (RUS) | Team Katusha | + 1' 57" |
| 4 | Sep Vanmarcke (BEL) | Topsport Vlaanderen–Mercator | + 2' 20" |
| 5 | Martin Reimer (GER) | Cervélo TestTeam | + 3' 40" |
| 6 | Steven Van Vooren (BEL) | Topsport Vlaanderen–Mercator | + 4' 33" |
| 7 | Martin Kohler (SUI) | BMC Racing Team | + 5' 11" |
| 8 | Ian Stannard (GBR) | Team Sky | + 5' 39" |
| 9 | Andreas Stauff (GER) | Quick-Step | + 5' 55" |
| 10 | Edvald Boasson Hagen (NOR) | Team Sky | + 7' 30" |

=== Team classification ===
| Pos. | Team | Time |
|---|---|---|
| 1 | Cervélo TestTeam | 47h 32′ 51″ |
| 2 | Topsport Vlaanderen–Mercator | + 17″ |
| 3 | Quick-Step | + 1′ 26″ |
| 4 | Vacansoleil | + 1′ 34″ |
| 5 | BMC Racing Team | + 2′ 04″ |
| 6 | Team Katusha | + 2′ 15″ |
| 7 | Garmin–Transitions | + 4′ 34″ |
| 8 | Team Milram | + 7′ 50″ |
| 9 | Omega Pharma–Lotto | + 8′ 52″ |
| 10 | Team Saxo Bank | + 9′ 14″ |
