= 2010 Ladies Tour of Qatar =

- Route of the 2010 Ladies Tour of Qatar

Race details
- Dates: 3–5 February 2010
- Stages: 3
- Winning time: 8h 18' 39"

Results
Jersey awarded to the overall winner	Winner	Kirsten Wild (the Netherlands)	(Cervélo TestTeam)
	Second	Giorgia Bronzini (Italy)	(Italy)
	Third	Rasa Leleivytė (Lithuania)	(Safi-Pasta Zara)
	Points	Giorgia Bronzini (Italy)	(Italy)
Jersey awarded to the youth classification winner	Youth	Rasa Leleivytė (Lithuania)	(Safi-Pasta Zara)

The 2010 Ladies Tour of Qatar was the second edition of the Ladies Tour of Qatar cycling stage race. It was rated by the UCI as category 2.1, and was held between 3 and 5 February 2010, in Qatar.

== Final classifications ==
=== General classification ===
	Rider	Team	Time
1	Kirsten Wild (NED)	Cervélo TestTeam	8h 18' 39"
2	Giorgia Bronzini (ITA)	Italy	+4"
3	Rasa Leleivytė (LTU)	Safi-Pasta Zara	+17"
4	Rochelle Gilmore (AUS)	Lotto–Belisol Ladiesteam	+19"
5	Martine Bras (NED)	Netherlands	+23"
6	Lauren Tamayo (USA)	United States of America	+23"
7	Adrie Visser (NED)	Team HTC-Columbia Women	+23"
8	Kirsty Broun (AUS)	Australia	+23"
9	Monique van de Ree (NED)	Netherlands	+24"
10	Sarah Düster (GER)	Cervélo TestTeam	+24"

=== Points classification ===
	Rider	Team	Points
1	Giorgia Bronzini (ITA)	Italy	85 points
2	Kirsten Wild (NED)	Garmin–Cervélo	72 points
3	Martine Bras (NED)	Netherlands	63 points
4	Rochelle Gilmore (AUS)	Lotto–Belisol Ladiesteam	52 points
5	Lauren Tamayo (USA)	United States of America	46 points
6	Rasa Leleivytė (LTU)	Safi-Pasta Zara	43 points
7	Monique van de Ree (NED)	Netherlands	37 points
8	Marina Romoli (ITA)	Safi-Pasta Zara	21 points
9	Pascale Jeuland (FRA)	France	20 points
10	Angela Hennig (GER)	Germany	20 points

=== Youth classification ===
	Rider	Team	Points
1	Rasa Leleivytė (LTU)	Safi-Pasta Zara	8h 18' 56"
2	Monique van de Ree (NED)	Netherlands	+7"
3	Pascala Jeuland (FRA)	France	+10"
4	Liu Xin (CHN)	Giant Pro Cycling	+10"
5	Tiffany Cromwell (AUS)	Australia	+10"
6	Ellen van Dijk (NED)	Team HTC-Columbia Women	+10"
7	Kim Schoonbaert (BEL)	Lotto Ladies Team	+10"
8	Oxana Kozonchuk (RUS)	Safi-Pasta Zara	+10"
9	Marlen Jöhrend (GER)	Germany	+10"
10	Trine Schmidt (DEN)	MTN	+10"
