= Thorsten Wilhelms =

Personal information
- Born: 31 July 1969 (age 57) Liebenau, Lower Saxony, Germany

Cycling career
- Sport: Cycling
- Current team: Retired
- Discipline: Road
- Role: Rider

Professional teams
- 1999: Greese
- 2000-2001: Nurnberger
- 2002-2003: Team Coast

Major wins
- Tour of Qatar (2002)

Thorsten Wilhelms (born 31 July 1969 in Liebenau, Lower Saxony) is a German former cyclist.

== Palmares ==
1993
1st stages 1, 6 and 7 Tour of Sweden
1st stage 3 Niedersachsen-Rundfahrt
1999
1st stage 5 Commonwealth Bank Classic
2000
1st stage 1 Troféu Joaquim Agostinho
2001
1st stages 3 and 5 Vuelta a Cuba
1st Prologue stage 1b Niedersachsen-Rundfahrt
1st stage 2 Troféu Joaquim Agostinho
2002
1st Tour of Qatar

1st stages 3 and 5

1st stage 1 Volta ao Algarve
1st stages 1 and 4 Niedersachsen-Rundfahrt
3rd Trofeo Palma de Mallorca
2003
1st stage 1b Niedersachsen-Rundfahrt
