= Steven de Jongh =

Dutch cyclist (born 1973)

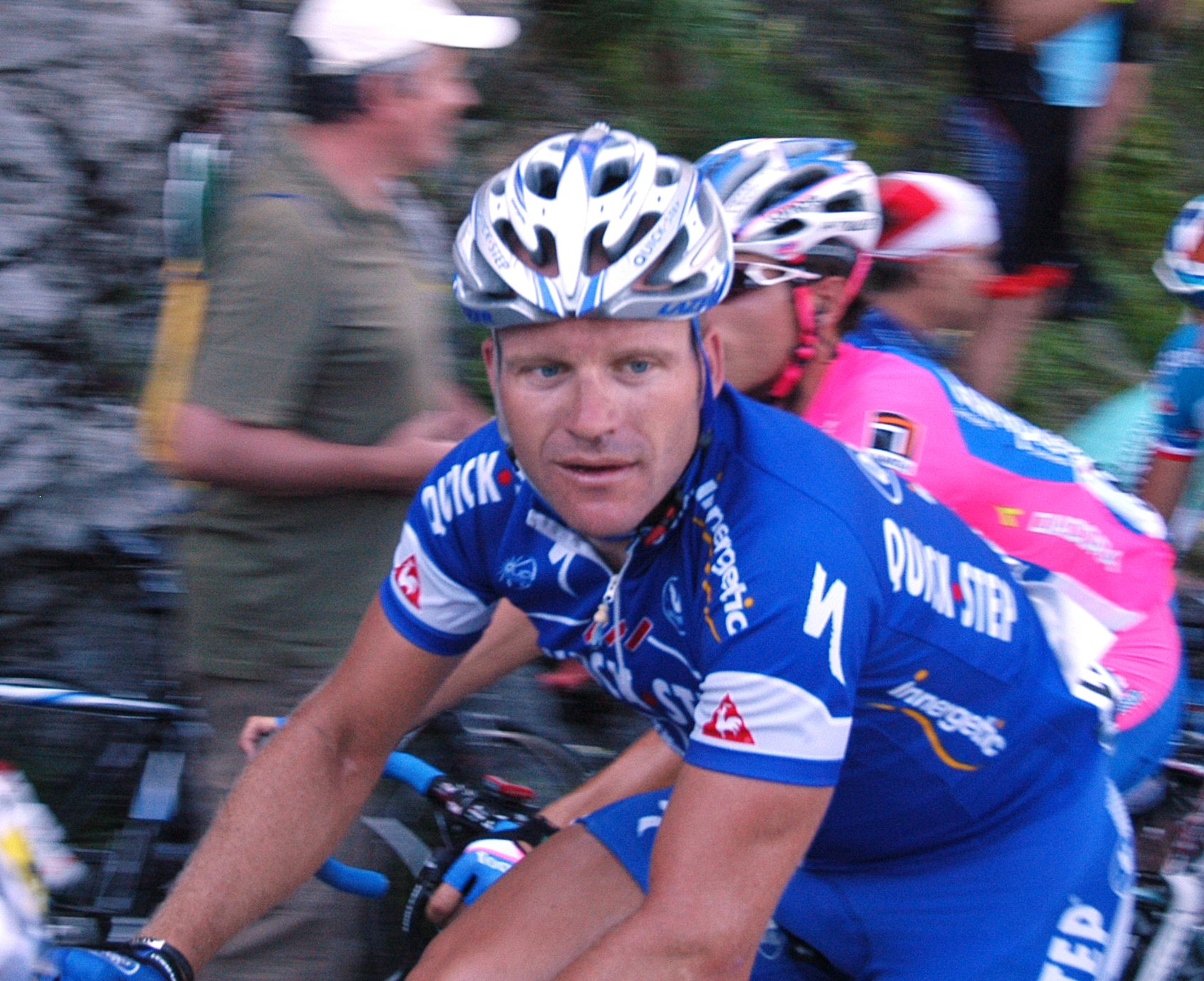
- de Jongh in the 2007 Tour de France

Personal information
- Full name: Steven de Jongh
- Born: 25 November 1973 (age 52) Alkmaar, the Netherlands
- Height: 1.76 m (5 ft 9 in)
- Weight: 76 kg (168 lb)

Cycling career
- Sport: Cycling
- Current team: Retired
- Discipline: Road
- Role: Rider
- Rider type: Sprinter

Professional teams
- 1995–1999: TVM–Polis Direct
- 2000–2005: Rabobank
- 2006–2009: Quick-Step–Innergetic

Managerial teams
- 2010–2012: Team Sky
- 2013–2016: Saxo–Tinkoff
- 2017–: Trek–Segafredo

Major wins
- E3 Prijs Vlaanderen (2003); Kuurne–Brussels–Kuurne (2004, 2008)

Steven de Jongh (born 25 November 1973) is a Dutch former road bicycle racer.

== Biography ==
de Jongh made his professional debut in 1995 at TVM team where he stayed until 1999. From 2000 to 2005 he was part of Rabobank, while he made the move to Quick-Step–Innergetic in 2006. De Jongh retired as a rider after the 2009 season.

He was a Directeur sportif at Team Sky for three years, leaving in October 2012 after admitting he had taken illegal substances earlier in his career. In January 2013 he joined Team Saxo-Tinkoff as a sports director. After the Tinkoff team announced their disbanding at the conclusion of the 2016 season, in September 2016 Trek–Segafredo confirmed that de Jongh would join them from 2017, along with Tinkoff riders Alberto Contador and Jesús Hernández.

On October 15, 2018, de Jongh was reported missing by his wife after he did not return from a training ride near his home in Girona, Spain. After she posted to Twitter to request help finding him, others noticed that his cycling computer had automatically uploaded his route to the social networking site Strava. Search efforts were then focused on the area near the end of the route, and de Jongh was found lying unconscious in a ravine near the road. He suffered a severe concussion but was not otherwise harmed. De Jongh later said that he had no memory of the crash and the cause was unknown.

== Major results ==
1992
3rd Dorpenomloop Rucphen
1994
1st Ronde van Zuid-Holland
1st Dokkum Woudenomloop
1st Stage 11 Commonwealth Bank Classic
1st Stage 2 Tour du Poitou-Charentes
1st Stage 6 Olympia's Tour
1st Stage 1 OZ Wielerweekend
3rd Ster van Zwolle
1995
1st Road race, National Under-23 Road Championships
1st PWZ Zuidenveld Tour
1st Grand Prix de Waregem
1st Stage 1 Tour de Pologne
1st Stages 1, 9 & 10 Tour of Austria
2nd Ster van Zwolle
2nd Omloop der Kempen
3rd Ronde van Drenthe
1996
4th HEW Cyclassics
8th Kampioenschap van Vlaanderen
9th Overall Étoile de Bessèges
9th Grand Prix d'Ouverture La Marseillaise
1997
1st Stage 3 Vuelta a Burgos
1st Stage 2 Tour de l'Avenir
1st Stage 3 Boland Bank Tour
4th Overall Tour of Sweden
1998
1st Overall Tour of Sweden

1st Stage 2

1st Stage 4 Étoile de Bessèges
3rd Nationale Sluitingprijs
1999
1st Stage 7 Tirreno–Adriatico
1st Stage 4 Vuelta a Castilla y León
1st Stage 2 Giro della Provincia di Lucca
2nd Nationale Sluitingprijs
3rd Overall Guldensporentweedaagse
3rd Kampioenschap van Vlaanderen
7th Delta Profronde
8th Grand Prix d'Isbergues
2000
1st Henk Vos Memorial
1st Nationale Sluitingsprijs
1st Schaal Sels
1st Veenendaal–Veenendaal
4th Trofeo Cala Millor-Cala Bona
7th Kampioenschap van Vlaanderen
2001
1st Veenendaal–Veenendaal
3rd Overall Guldensporentweedaagse
2002
1st Schaal Sels
1st Rund um den Flughafen Köln-Bonn
1st Stages 1b & 2 Tour of Sweden
1st Stage 2 Ronde van Nederland
2nd Ronde van Midden-Zeeland
3rd Nokere-Koerse
4th Road race, National Road Championships
6th Tour Beneden-Maas
6th Trofeo Cala Millor-Cala Bona
8th Henk Vos Memorial
2003
1st Schaal Sels
1st E3 Prijs Vlaanderen
1st Stage 3a Three Days of De Panne
8th GP Rudy Dhaenens
2004
1st Kuurne–Brussels–Kuurne
2nd Overall Circuit Franco-Belge
2nd Nationale Sluitingprijs
4th E3 Prijs Vlaanderen
4th Giro del Piemonte
10th Ronde van Midden-Zeeland
2005
1st Nokere Koerse
2nd Road race, National Road Championships
2nd Giro del Piemonte
2nd Noord-Nederland Tour
2nd Tour de Rijke
3rd Omloop Het Volk
3rd Trofeo Manacor
4th GP Stad Zottegem
7th Veenendaal–Veenendaal
10th Overall Ster Elektrotoer
2006
1st Ronde van Midden-Zeeland
2nd Scheldeprijs
2nd Kampioenschap van Vlaanderen
3rd Paris–Brussels
4th Veenendaal–Veenendaal
6th Overall Three Days of De Panne

1st Stage 3

7th Overall Tour of Qatar
8th Tour de Rijke
9th Overall Tour of Belgium
10th Giro della Provincia di Lucca
2007
1st GP Briek Schotte
1st Omloop van het Houtland
1st Omloop Wase Scheldeboorden
3rd Overall Tour of Qatar

1st Stage 1

3rd Memorial Rik Van Steenbergen
4th Paris–Tours
5th GP Ouest–France
5th Paris–Brussels
9th Tour de Rijke
10th Omloop Het Volk
2008
1st Kuurne–Brussels–Kuurne
1st Tour de Rijke
2nd Overall Tour of Qatar

1st Stage 1 (TTT)

2nd Dwars door Vlaanderen
3rd Road race, National Road Championships
10th Memorial Rik Van Steenbergen
2009
1st Kampioenschap van Vlaanderen
3rd Memorial Rik Van Steenbergen
3rd Dutch Food Valley Classic
5th Overall Circuit Franco-Belge
9th Tour de Rijke
