= 2008 Tour of Qatar =

Cycling race

The 2008 Tour of Qatar was held from 27 January to 1 February 2008 in Qatar. It is a multiple stage road cycling race that took part over six stages with a total of 712.5 kilometres and is part of the 2007–08 UCI Asia Tour.

== Stage summary ==
Stage	Date	Start	Finish	Distance	Stage Top 3	Leading Top 3	Time
1	27 January	Doha Corniche	Doha Corniche	6 km	(Belgium) Quick-Step (United States) Team Slipstream (Netherlands) Skil–Shimano	(Italy) Matteo Tosatto (Belgium) Wilfried Cretskens (Netherlands) Steven de Jongh	6:35 + 0:00 + 0:00
2	28 January	Zubarah	Doha Golf Club	137.5 km	(Belgium) Tom Boonen (Belgium) Greg Van Avermaet (Italy) Danilo Napolitano	(Belgium) Tom Boonen (Netherlands) Steven de Jongh (Belgium) Greg Van Avermaet	2:34:59 + 0:09 + 0:14
3	29 January	Camel Race Track	Qatar Foundation	147.5 km	(Belgium) Tom Boonen (Italy) Danilo Napolitano (Netherlands) Steven de Jongh	(Belgium) Tom Boonen (Netherlands) Steven de Jongh (Belgium) Greg Van Avermaet	6:04:30 + 0:13 + 0:24
4	30 January	Khalifa International Stadium	Al Khor Corniche	131.5 km	(Italy) Alberto Loddo (Belgium) Tom Boonen (Germany) Sebastian Siedler	(Belgium) Tom Boonen (Netherlands) Steven de Jongh (Belgium) Greg Van Avermaet	8:48:57 + 0:16 + 0:28
5	31 January	Al Khor Academy	Al Khor Corniche	170 km	(Italy) Danilo Napolitano (Italy) Alberto Loddo (Belgium) Tom Boonen	(Belgium) Tom Boonen (Netherlands) Steven de Jongh (Belgium) Greg Van Avermaet	12:38:07 + 0:17 + 0:30
6	1 February	Al Wakrah	Doha Corniche	120 km	(Belgium) Tom Boonen (Italy) Alberto Loddo (Brazil) Luciano Pagliarini	(Belgium) Tom Boonen (Netherlands) Steven de Jongh (Belgium) Greg Van Avermaet	15:27:44 + 0:27 + 0:40

== Other leading top threes ==
Stage	Sprints	Pts	Under 23	Time	Teams	Time
1	no sprints	none	(Australia) Christopher Sutton (Netherlands) Martijn Maaskant (Netherlands) Huub Duyn	6:37 + 0:00 + 0:00	(Belgium) Quick-Step (United States) Team Slipstream (Netherlands) Skil–Shimano	6:35 + 0:02 + 0:05
2	(Belgium) Tom Boonen (Belgium) Greg Van Avermaet (Italy) Danilo Napolitano	33; 27; 25	(Belgium) Greg Van Avermaet (Australia) Christopher Sutton (Belgium) Jürgen Roelandts	2:35:13 + 0:01 + 0:06	(Belgium) Quick-Step (Belgium) Silence–Lotto (Netherlands) Skil–Shimano	7:32:33 + 0:07 + 2:08
3	(Belgium) Tom Boonen (Italy) Danilo Napolitano (Belgium) Greg Van Avermaet	63; 52; 51	(Belgium) Greg Van Avermaet (Australia) Christopher Sutton (Belgium) Jürgen Roelandts	6:04:53 + 0:03 + 0:09	(Belgium) Quick-Step (Belgium) Silence–Lotto (Netherlands) Skil–Shimano	18:01:41 + 0:09 + 2:47
4	(Belgium) Tom Boonen (Belgium) Greg Van Avermaet (Australia) Christopher Sutton	90; 69; 64	(Belgium) Greg Van Avermaet (Australia) Christopher Sutton (Belgium) Jürgen Roelandts	8:49:23 + 0:06 + 0:10	(Belgium) Quick-Step (Belgium) Silence–Lotto (Netherlands) Skil–Shimano	26:15:20 + 0:09 + 2:47
5	(Belgium) Tom Boonen (Italy) Danilo Napolitano (Belgium) Greg Van Avermaet	115; 92; 79	(Belgium) Greg Van Avermaet (Australia) Christopher Sutton (Belgium) Jürgen Roelandts	12:38:37 + 0:06 + 0:10	(Belgium) Quick-Step (Belgium) Silence–Lotto (Netherlands) Skil–Shimano	37:43:02 + 0:09 + 2:47
6	(Belgium) Tom Boonen (Italy) Danilo Napolitano (Italy) Alberto Loddo	145; 105; 97	(Belgium) Greg Van Avermaet (Australia) Christopher Sutton (Belgium) Jürgen Roelandts	15:28:24 + 0:06 + 0:10	(Belgium) Quick-Step (Belgium) Silence–Lotto (Netherlands) Skil–Shimano	46:12:23 + 0:09 + 2:47

== Men's top 10 overall ==
Pos	Rider	Time
1	(Belgium) Tom Boonen	15:27:44
2	(Netherlands) Steven de Jongh	+ 0:27
3	(Belgium) Greg Van Avermaet	+ 0:40
4	(Australia) Christopher Sutton	+ 0:46
5	(Belgium) Jürgen Roelandts	+ 0:50
6	(France) Alexandre Pichot	+ 1:10
7	(Netherlands) Maarten Tjallingii	+ 1:12
8	(Italy) Alberto Loddo	+ 1:22
9	(Belgium) Wilfried Cretskens	+ 1:31
10	(Germany) Sebastian Siedler	+ 1:41
