= Alexandre Pichot =

Road bicycle racer

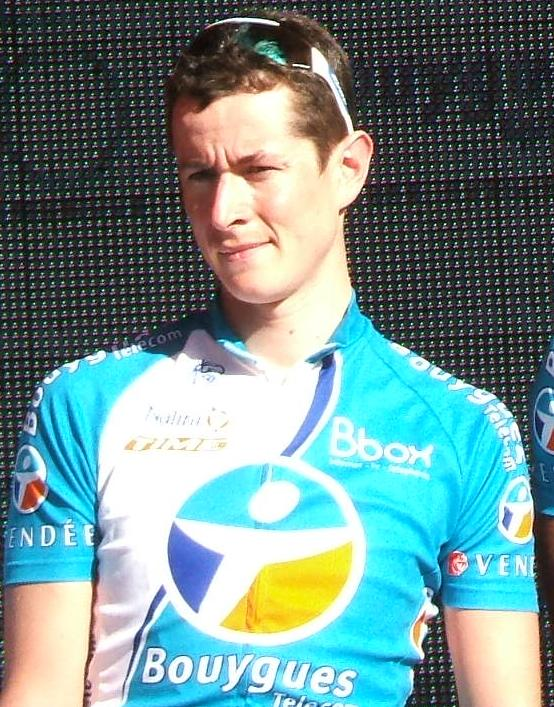
- Pichot at the 2009 Tour Down Under

Personal information
- Full name: Alexandre Pichot
- Born: 6 January 1983 (age 43) Caen, France
- Height: 1.83 m (6 ft 0 in)
- Weight: 72 kg (159 lb)

Cycling career
- Sport: Cycling
- Current team: Retired
- Discipline: Road
- Role: Rider
- Rider type: Classics specialist

Amateur teams
- 2002–2005: Vendée U–Pays de la Loire
- 2005: Bouygues Télécom (stagiaire)

Professional team
- 2006–2019: Bouygues Télécom

Alexandre Pichot (born 6 January 1983) is a French former professional road bicycle racer, who competed professionally between 2006 and 2019, entirely for the Bouygues Télécom team and its later iterations.

== Major results ==
2003
1st Stage 2 Tour de Guadeloupe
1st Stage 3 Circuit des Ardennes
2004
7th La Roue Tourangelle
7th La Côte Picarde
2005
3rd Grand Prix de Waregem
4th La Côte Picarde
7th Overall Ruban Granitier Breton
7th Classic Loire Atlantique
2006
10th Overall Tour de Picardie
10th Grand Prix de Rennes
2007
8th Overall Tour of Qatar

1st Young rider classification

2008
5th Paris–Camembert
6th Overall Tour of Qatar
2009
3rd Cholet-Pays de Loire
2010
7th Overall Tour de Picardie
9th Overall Boucles de la Mayenne
2012
5th Dwars door Vlaanderen
8th E3 Harelbeke
9th Omloop Het Nieuwsblad
2013
6th Tour de la Somme
7th Tour du Doubs
2014
9th Trofeo Muro–Port d'Alcúdia
2017
10th Overall La Tropicale Amissa Bongo
2018
10th Le Samyn

=== Grand Tour general classification results timeline ===
Grand Tour	2007	2008	2009	2010	2011	2012	2013	2014
Giro d'Italia	125	—	—	—	—	—	—	—
Tour de France	—	—	117	—	—	—	—	107
Vuelta a España	—	DNF	—	121	—	—	—	—
