= 2009 Hel van het Mergelland =

Race details
- Dates: 4 April 2009
- Stages: 1
- Distance: 190 km (118.1 mi)
- Winning time: 4h 40' 16"

Results
	Winner	Mauro Finetto (ITA)
	Second	Federico Canuti (ITA)
	Third	Wouter Mol (NED)

The 2009 Hel van het Mergelland was the 36th edition of the Volta Limburg Classic cycle race and was held on 4 April 2009. The race started and finished in Eijsden. The race was won by Mauro Finetto.

== General classification ==
Final general classification

Rank	Rider	Time
1	Mauro Finetto (ITA)	4h 40' 16"
2	Federico Canuti (ITA)	+ 0"
3	Wouter Mol (NED)	+ 31"
4	Koos Moerenhout (NED)	+ 31"
5	Jonathan Hivert (FRA)	+ 39"
6	Borut Božič (SLO)	+ 53"
7	Tom Stamsnijder (NED)	+ 53"
8	Marco Frapporti (ITA)	+ 53"
9	Dmitry Kozonchuk (RUS)	+ 1' 00"
10	Dirk Bellemakers (NED)	+ 3' 09"
