= 2009 Ladies Tour of Qatar =

- Route of the 2009 Ladies Tour of Qatar

Race details
- Dates: 8–10 February 2009
- Stages: 3
- Distance: 313 km (194 mi)
- Winning time: 7h 56' 21"

Results
| Jersey awarded to the overall winner | Winner | Kirsten Wild (NED) | (Cervélo TestTeam) |
| | Second | Giorgia Bronzini (ITA) | (Safi–Pasta Zara–Titanedi) |
| | Third | Kirsty Broun (AUS) | (Australia) |
| Jersey awarded to the points classification winner | Points | Kirsten Wild (NED) | (Cervélo TestTeam) |
| Jersey awarded to the youth classification winner | Youth | Ellen van Dijk (NED) | (Team Columbia–HTC) |

The 2009 Ladies Tour of Qatar was the first edition of the Ladies Tour of Qatar cycling stage race. It was rated by the UCI as category 2.1, and was held between 8 and 10 February 2009, in Qatar.

== Stages ==
=== Stage 1 ===
8 February 2009 – Doha to Doha, 94 km (58.4 mi)

The sprint of the front group of 21 riders was won by Giorgia Bronzini before Kirsten Wild and Ellen van Dijk.

Stage 1 Result

| | Rider | Team | Time |
|---|---|---|---|
| 1 | Giorgia Bronzini (ITA) | Safi–Pasta Zara–Titanedi | 2h 26' 21" |
| 2 | Kirsten Wild (NED) | Cervélo TestTeam | s.t. |
| 3 | Ellen van Dijk (NED) | Team Columbia–HTC | s.t. |
| 4 | Kirsty Broun (AUS) | Australia | +6" |
| 5 | Martine Bras (NED) | Menikini-Selle Italia-Master Colors | +6" |

General Classification after Stage 1

| | Rider | Team | Time |
|---|---|---|---|
| 1 | Giorgia Bronzini (ITA) | Safi–Pasta Zara–Titanedi | 2h 26' 09" |
| 2 | Kirsten Wild (NED) | Cervélo TestTeam | +0" |
| 3 | Ellen van Dijk (NED) | Team Columbia–HTC | +8" |
| 4 | Kirsty Broun (AUS) | Australia | +12" |
| 5 | Mirjam Melchers (NED) | Team Flexpoint | +15" |

=== Stage 2 ===
9 February 2009 – Doha to Oryx Farm, 110 km (68.4 mi)

Stage 2 Result

| | Rider | Team | Time |
|---|---|---|---|
| 1 | Eva Lutz (GER) | Equipe Nürnberger Versicherung | 2h 49' 56" |
| 2 | Veronica Andréasson (SWE) | Bigla Cycling Team | s.t. |
| 3 | Rochelle Gilmore (AUS) | Lotto–Belisol Ladiesteam | +14" |
| 4 | Kirsten Wild (NED) | Cervélo TestTeam | +14" |
| 5 | Giorgia Bronzini (ITA) | Safi–Pasta Zara–Titanedi | +14" |

General Classification after Stage 2

| | Rider | Team | Time |
|---|---|---|---|
| 1 | Kirsten Wild (NED) | Cervélo TestTeam | 5h 16' 14" |
| 2 | Giorgia Bronzini (ITA) | Safi–Pasta Zara–Titanedi | +5" |
| 3 | Ellen van Dijk (NED) | Team Columbia–HTC | +12" |
| 4 | Kirsty Broun (AUS) | Australia | +13" |
| 5 | Mirjam Melchers (NED) | Team Flexpoint | +20" |

=== Stage 3 ===
10 February 2009 – Camelodrome to Al Khawr, 109 km (67.7 mi)

Team Flexpoint split the bunch with about 10 kilometres to go. After the bunch regrouped slightly, Ellen van Dijk attacked with 800 metres to go. The headwind was very strong and Van Dijk couldn't stay away. The bunch sprint was won by Giorgia Bronzini before Rochelle Gilmore and Kirsten Wild, who won the general and points classification. Ellen van Dijk, finishing 6th, won the Best Young Rider's classification.

Stage 3 Result

| | Rider | Team | Time |
|---|---|---|---|
| 1 | Giorgia Bronzini (ITA) | Safi–Pasta Zara–Titanedi | 2h 40' 18" |
| 2 | Rochelle Gilmore (AUS) | Lotto–Belisol Ladiesteam | s.t. |
| 3 | Kirsten Wild (NED) | Cervélo TestTeam | s.t. |
| 4 | Martine Bras (NED) | Menikini-Selle Italia-Master Colors | s.t. |
| 5 | Regina Schleicher (GER) | Equipe Nürnberger Versicherung | s.t. |

General Classification after Stage 3

| | Rider | Team | Time |
|---|---|---|---|
| 1 | Kirsten Wild (NED) | Cervélo TestTeam | 7h 56' 21" |
| 2 | Giorgia Bronzini (ITA) | Safi–Pasta Zara–Titanedi | +4" |
| 3 | Kirsty Broun (AUS) | Australia | +21" |
| 4 | Ellen van Dijk (NED) | Team Columbia–HTC | + 24" |
| 5 | Mirjam Melchers (NED) | Team Flexpoint | + 31" |

== Classification leadership ==
In the 2009 Ladies Tour of Qatar, three different jerseys are awarded. For the general classification, calculated by adding each cyclist's finishing times on each stage, and allowing time bonuses for the first three finishers on each stage and in intermediate sprints, the leader receives a golden jersey. This classification is considered the most important of the Tour of Qatar, and the winner is considered the winner of the Tour.

Additionally, there is a points classification, which awards a silver jersey. In the points classification, cyclists get points for finishing in the top three in an intermediate sprint or the top twenty of a stage. The first in an intermediate sprint gets 3 points, second 2, and third a single point. The stage win affords 30 points, second is worth 27 points, 25 for third, 23 for fourth, 21 for fifth, 19 for sixth, 17 for seventh, 15 for eighth, 13 for ninth, 11 for tenth, and one point less per place down the line, to a single point for twentieth.

There is also a youth classification, which awards a blue jersey. This classification is calculated the same as the general classification, but only riders born on or after January 1, 1984, are eligible.

| Stage | Winner | General Classification | Points Classification | Young Rider Classification |
|---|---|---|---|---|
| 1 | Giorgia Bronzini | Giorgia Bronzini | Kirsten Wild | Ellen van Dijk |
| 2 | Eva Lutz | Kirsten Wild | Kirsten Wild | Ellen van Dijk |
| 3 | Giorgia Bronzini | Kirsten Wild | Kirsten Wild | Ellen van Dijk |
| Final | | Kirsten Wild | Kirsten Wild | Ellen van Dijk |

== Final classifications ==
=== General classification ===
| | Rider | Team | Time |
|---|---|---|---|
| 1 | Kirsten Wild (NED) | Cervélo TestTeam | 7h 56' 21" |
| 2 | Giorgia Bronzini (ITA) | Safi–Pasta Zara–Titanedi | + 4" |
| 3 | Kirsty Broun (AUS) | Australia | + 21" |
| 4 | Ellen van Dijk (NED) | Team Columbia–HTC | + 24" |
| 5 | Mirjam Melchers (NED) | Team Flexpoint | + 31" |
| 6 | Suzanne de Goede (NED) | Equipe Nürnberger Versicherung | + 32" |
| 7 | Martine Bras (NED) | Menikini-Selle Italia-Master Colors | + 33" |
| 8 | Loes Gunnewijk (NED) | Team Flexpoint | + 33" |
| 9 | Marina Jaunâtre (FRA) | France | + 34" |
| 10 | Noemi Cantele (ITA) | Bigla Cycling Team | + 34" |

=== Points Classification ===
| | Rider | Team | Points |
|---|---|---|---|
| 1 | Kirsten Wild (NED) | Cervélo TestTeam | 93 points |
| 2 | Giorgia Bronzini (ITA) | Safi–Pasta Zara–Titanedi | 85 points |
| 3 | Martine Bras (NED) | Menikini-Selle Italia-Master Colors | 62 points |
| 4 | Ellen van Dijk (NED) | Team Columbia–HTC | 59 points |
| 5 | Rochelle Gilmore (AUS) | Lotto–Belisol Ladiesteam | 52 points |

=== Youth Classification ===
New Columbia-Highroad women's team rider Ellen van Dijk secured the Best Young Rider prize. Van Dijk's consistency after taking the jersey on the first day when she made it into the front group of 21 riders. The last hour of the last stage was a tense affair for the Dutchwoman, when she was caught on the wrong side of a split. She had to get past seven groups and finally crossed the line in sixth place, in the same time as stage winner, and won the Best Young Rider's classification.

| | Rider | Team | Time |
|---|---|---|---|
| 1 | Ellen van Dijk (NED) | Team Columbia–HTC | 7h 56' 45" |
| 2 | Suzanne de Goede (NED) | Equipe Nürnberger Versicherung | + 8" |
| 3 | Regina Bruins (NED) | Cervélo TestTeam | + 30" |
| 4 | Monique van de Ree (NED) | leontien.nl | + 1' 21" |
| 5 | Trine Schmidt (DEN) | Team Flexpoint | + 1' 21" |
