= Wouter Mol =

Dutch cyclist (born 1982)

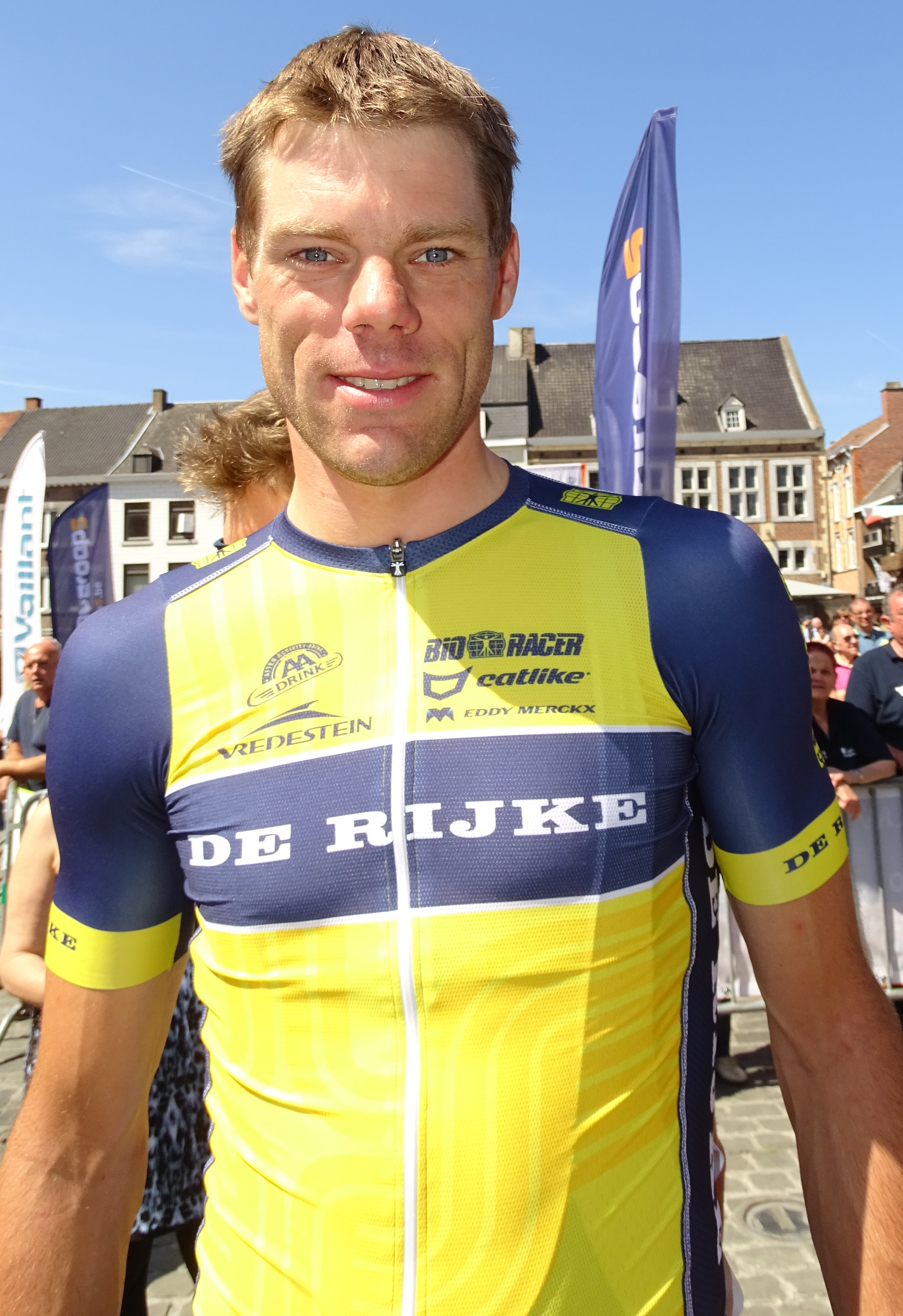
- Mol at the 2015 Ronde van Limburg.

Personal information
- Full name: Wouter Mol
- Born: 17 April 1982 (age 44) Nibbixwoud, the Netherlands
- Height: 1.95 m (6 ft 5 in)
- Weight: 83 kg (183 lb)

Cycling career
- Sport: Cycling
- Discipline: Road
- Role: Rider

Professional teams
- 2004: Team Moser-AH.nl
- 2005: Shimano–Memory Corp
- 2006–2008: Fondas-P3Transfer Team
- 2009–2013: Vacansoleil
- 2014: Vastgoedservice–Golden Palace
- 2015–2016: Cyclingteam de Rijke

Major wins
- Tour of Qatar (2010)

Wouter Mol (born 17 April 1982 in Nibbixwoud) is a Dutch former professional road racing cyclist, who rode professionally between 2004 and 2016.

== 2012 Tour Down Under ==
One tradition of the Tour Down Under is that the fans choose an unknown rider and treat him the way they would a star, by mobbing him at hotels and painting his name on the road. The rider must be a non-English speaking domestique who most likely will not get a start at a major race and will simply act as a bottle carrier. For 2012, Vacansoleil–DCM rider Mol was chosen.

== Major results ==
2006
3rd Ronde van Drenthe
5th Nokere Koerse
7th Nationale Sluitingsprijs
2007
1st Grote 1-MeiPrijs
4th GP de Dourges-Hénin-Beaumont
6th Omloop van het Houtland
7th Ronde van Overijssel
2008
1st Grote Prijs Jef Scherens
3rd Drie Zustersteden
8th Nationale Sluitingsprijs
2009
2nd Münsterland Giro
3rd Hel van het Mergelland
10th Ronde van het Groene Hart
2010
1st Overall Tour of Qatar
3rd Profronde van Fryslan
6th GP Herning
7th Dwars door Vlaanderen
9th Arno Wallaard Memorial
2011
9th Grote Prijs Stad Zottegem
2012
10th Classic Loire Atlantique
2013
3rd Grote Prijs Stad Zottegem
6th Overall World Ports Classic
10th Kampioenschap van Vlaanderen
2014
3rd GP Maurice Raes
6th Omloop der Kempen
2015
2nd Arno Wallaard Memorial
3rd Ronde van Limburg
7th Arnhem–Veenendaal Classic
8th Grote Prijs Stad Zottegem
9th Ronde van Drenthe
2016
1st Stage 5 Rás Tailteann
3rd Ronde van Noord-Holland
4th Slag om Norg
9th Grote Prijs Stad Zottegem
10th De Kustpijl
