= Tom Stamsnijder =

Dutch road bicycle racer

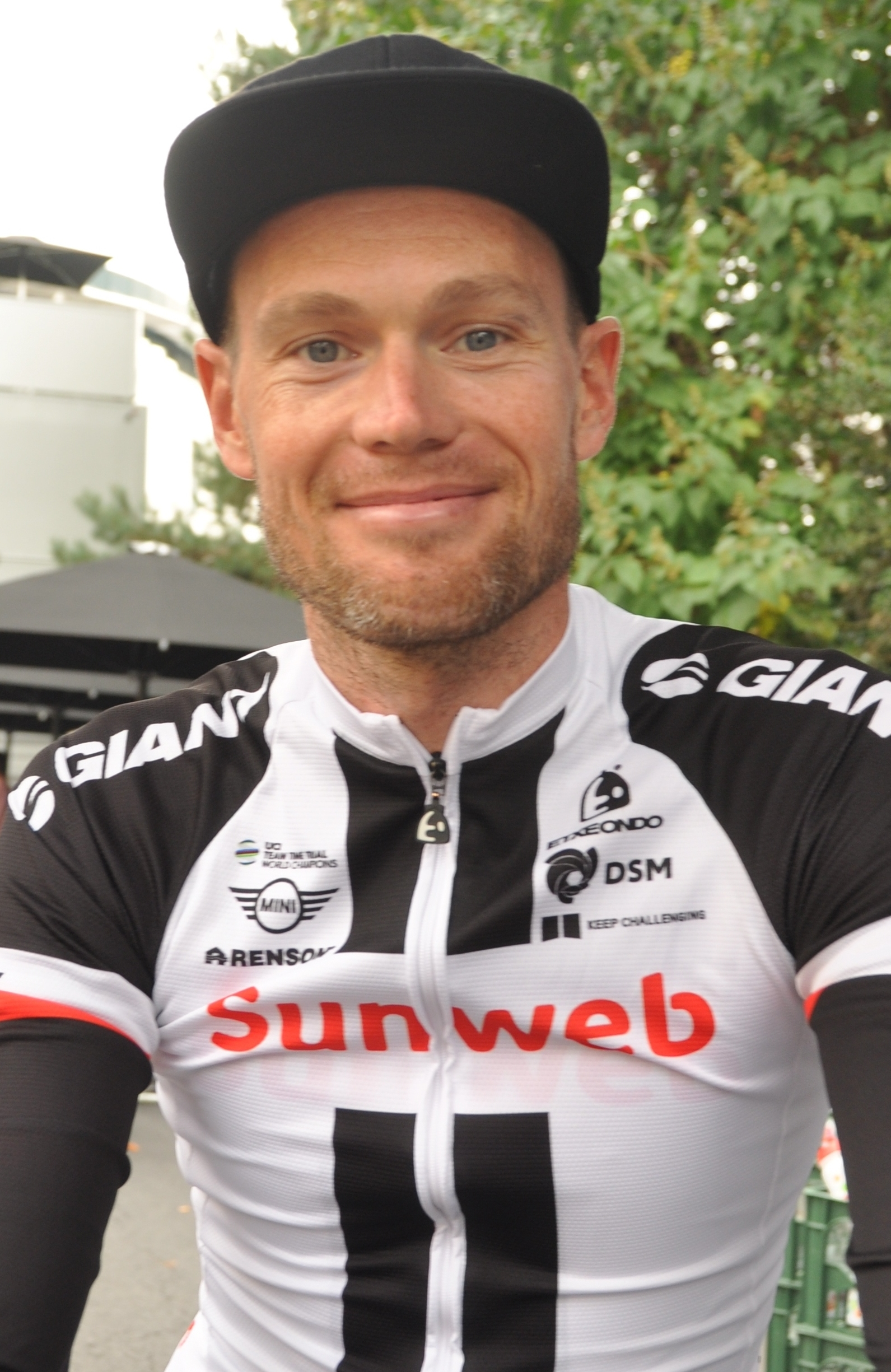
- Stamsnijder in 2018.

Personal information
- Full name: Tom Stamsnijder
- Born: 15 May 1985 (age 41) Wierden, the Netherlands
- Height: 1.91 m (6 ft 3 in)
- Weight: 76 kg (168 lb)

Cycling career
- Sport: Cycling
- Discipline: Road
- Role: Rider

Professional teams
- 2004–2006: Rabobank GS3
- 2007–2008: Gerolsteiner
- 2009–2010: Rabobank
- 2011: Leopard Trek
- 2012–2018: Project 1t4i

Tom Stamsnijder (born 15 May 1985 in Wierden) is a Dutch former professional road bicycle racer, who rode professionally between 2004 and 2018 for the Rabobank Continental Team, Gerolsteiner, Rabobank, Leopard Trek and Team Sunweb squads. Stamsnijder is the son of former cyclo-cross world champion Hennie Stamsnijder.

== Major results ==
2002
1st Tour of Flanders Junioren
3rd Road race, National Junior Road Championships
2003
National Junior Road Championships

3rd Road race
3rd Time trial

2004
3rd Circuit de Wallonie
6th Omloop van het Waasland
7th Overall Mainfranken-Tour

1st Prologue & Stage 2

7th Paris–Roubaix Espoirs
9th Rund um den Henninger Turm U23
10th Overall Thüringen Rundfahrt der U23
2005
1st Stage 3 Tour de la Somme
1st Prologue Thüringen Rundfahrt der U23
3rd Time trial, National Under-23 Road Championships
4th Ronde van Vlaanderen U23
4th Paris–Roubaix Espoirs
6th Omloop van het Waasland
7th Overall Le Triptyque des Monts et Châteaux
8th Grand Prix de la Ville de Lillers
2006
1st Stage 4 Grand Prix Guillaume Tell
1st Stage 1 Settimana Ciclistica Lombarda
1st Stage 2 Roserittet GP
2nd Liège–Bastogne–Liège U23
5th Overall Tour de Normandie
2007
2nd Sparkassen Giro Bochum
2008
3rd Overall Danmark Rundt
2009
7th Hel van het Mergelland
2012
9th Ronde van Drenthe

=== Grand Tour general classification results timeline ===
Grand Tour	2007	2008	2009	2010	2011	2012	2013	2014	2015	2016	2017
Giro d'Italia	—	—	134	109	DNF	—	—	143	153	143	154
Tour de France	Did not contest during his career										
Vuelta a España	120	88	—	—	—	—	137	—	155	131	—

Legend
—	Did not compete
DNF	Did not finish
