= Wilfried Cretskens =

Belgian former road bicycle racer

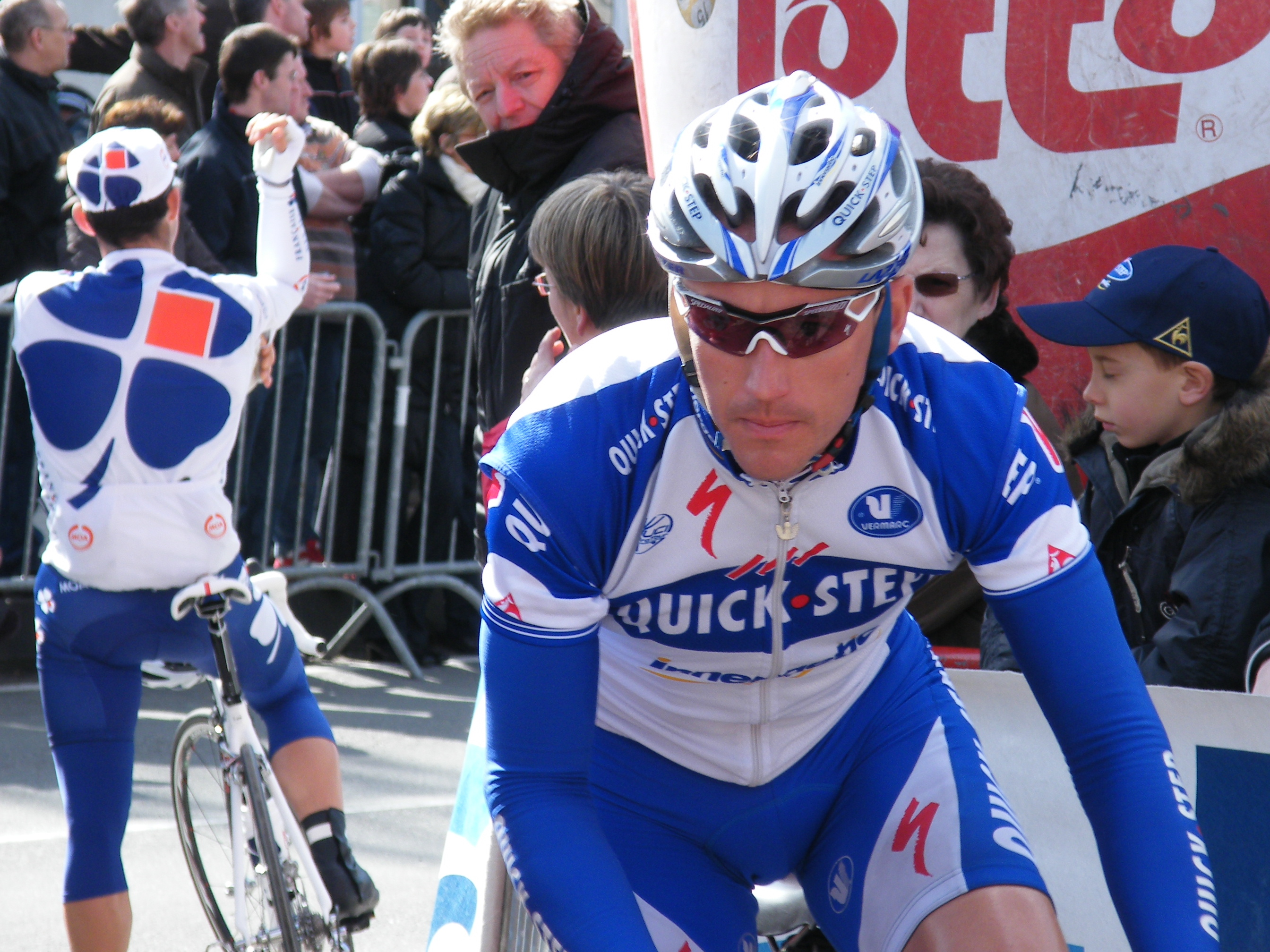
- Cretskens at the 2008 E3 Harelbeke

Personal information
- Full name: Wilfried Cretskens
- Born: 10 July 1976 (age 50)
- Height: 1.82 m (6 ft 0 in)
- Weight: 75 kg (165 lb)

Cycling career
- Sport: Cycling
- Current team: retired
- Discipline: Road
- Role: Rider

Amateur team
- 1997: Vlaanderen 2002

Professional teams
- 1998–2000: Vlaanderen 2002
- 2001–2002: Domo-Farm Frites
- 2003–2008: Quick-Step–Davitamon
- 2009–2010: Silence–Lotto
- 2011: Donckers Koffie-Jelly Belly

Major wins
- Tour of Qatar (2007)

Wilfried Cretskens (born 10 July 1976) is a Belgian former road bicycle racer. He rode most of his career for the Quick-Step–Innergetic team, where he was a domestique for the team leaders in the classic races, among others Tom Boonen. His most notable career win was the 2007 Tour of Qatar.

== Major results ==
1993
1st Tour of Flanders Juniors
1999
3rd Nokere Koerse
5th Le Samyn
6th Overall Circuit de Lorraine

1st Stage 6

8th Brussel-Ingooigem
2001
2nd Omloop van het Waasland
6th Grand Prix de Rennes
10th Grote Prijs Jef Scherens
2003
9th Nationale Sluitingsprijs
2004
10th Tour de Rijke
2005
8th GP Rudy Dhaenens
2007
1st Overall Tour of Qatar
7th GP Briek Schotte
2008
9th Overall Tour of Qatar

== Tour de France participations ==
- 2005: DNF
- 2006: DNF

== Personal life ==
Cretskens was born in Herk-de-Stad.
