= Nick Ingels =

Belgian cyclist (born 1984)

Personal information
- Full name: Nick Ingels
- Born: 2 September 1984 (age 42) Eeklo, Belgium
- Height: 1.83 m (6 ft 0 in)
- Weight: 70 kg (150 lb)

Cycling career
- Sport: Cycling
- Discipline: Road
- Role: Rider

Professional teams
- 2006–2007: Predictor-Lotto
- 2008: Topsport Vlaanderen

Nick Ingels (born 2 September 1984) is a Belgian professional road bicycle racer, riding for UCI Professional Continental team Topsport Vlaanderen in 2008.

== Palmarès ==
- Omloop Het Volk - U23 version (2005)
- 3rd, European U23 Road Race Championship (2005)
