= Tour of Qatar =

Qatari multi-day road cycling race

Race details
- Date: January–February
- Region: Qatar
- Discipline: Road
- Type: Stage race
- Organiser: Amaury Sport Organisation
- Web site: www.letour.fr/us/homepage_courseTQA.html

History
- First edition: 2002
- Editions: 15 (as of 2016)
- First winner: Thorsten Wilhelms (GER)
- Most wins: Tom Boonen (BEL) (4 wins)
- Most recent: Mark Cavendish (GBR)

The Tour of Qatar was an annual professional cycling stage race held in Qatar. First organized in 2002, the event was part of the UCI Asia Tour until 2016. The 2017 edition was to have seen the event upgraded to the UCI World Tour for the first time, but it was cancelled due to lack of sponsorship support.

The event consisted of a men's competition over five stages, and, since 2009, a women's competition over four stages – held a week before the men's race. Because Qatar is entirely flat, the tour was almost always won by a sprinter or classics specialist. Belgian Tom Boonen and Dutchwoman Kirsten Wild hold the record with four overall wins, in the men's and ladies' competition respectively.

== Men's past winners ==
=== General classification ===
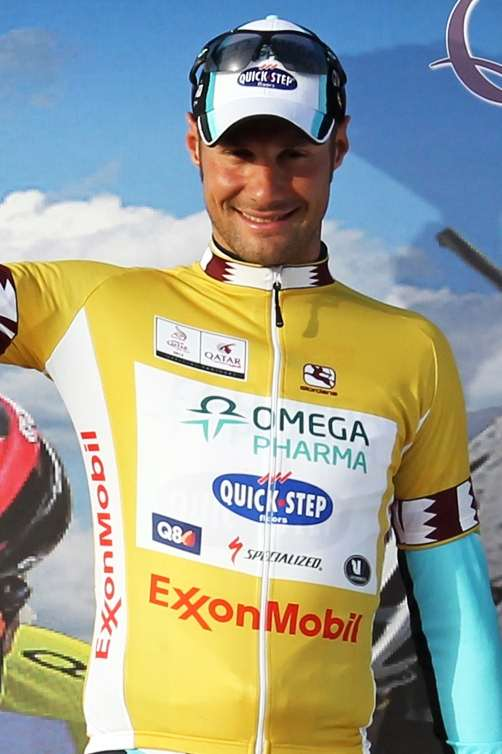
Tom Boonen (pictured at the 2012 Tour of Qatar) holds a record 4 overall wins and 22 stage wins.

Year	Country	Rider	Team
2002	Germany	Thorsten Wilhelms	Team Coast
2003	Italy	Alberto Loddo	Lampre
2004	South Africa	Robert Hunter	Rabobank
2005	Denmark	Lars Michaelsen	Team CSC
2006	Belgium	Tom Boonen	Quick-Step–Innergetic
2007	Belgium	Wilfried Cretskens	Quick-Step–Innergetic
2008	Belgium	Tom Boonen	Quick-Step
2009	Belgium	Tom Boonen	Quick-Step
2010	Netherlands	Wouter Mol	Vacansoleil
2011	Australia	Mark Renshaw	HTC–Highroad
2012	Belgium	Tom Boonen	Omega Pharma–Quick-Step
2013	Great Britain	Mark Cavendish	Omega Pharma–Quick-Step
2014	Netherlands	Niki Terpstra	Omega Pharma–Quick-Step
2015	Netherlands	Niki Terpstra	Etixx–Quick-Step
2016	Great Britain	Mark Cavendish	Team Dimension Data

=== Points classification ===
Year	Country	Rider	Team
2002	Germany	Thorsten Wilhelms	Team Coast
2003	Italy	Alberto Loddo	Lampre
2004	Belgium	Tom Boonen	Quick-Step–Davitamon
2005	Belgium	Tom Boonen	Quick-Step–Innergetic
2006	Belgium	Tom Boonen	Quick-Step–Innergetic
2007	Belgium	Tom Boonen	Quick-Step–Innergetic
2008	Belgium	Tom Boonen	Quick-Step
2009	Germany	Heinrich Haussler	Cervélo TestTeam
2010	Germany	Heinrich Haussler	Cervélo TestTeam
2011	Australia	Heinrich Haussler (Note: Haussler announced he would give up his German citizenship and would ride for Australia in the future.)	Garmin–Cervélo
2012	Belgium	Tom Boonen	Omega Pharma–Quick-Step
2013	Great Britain	Mark Cavendish	Omega Pharma–Quick-Step
2014	Belgium	Tom Boonen	Omega Pharma–Quick-Step
2015	Norway	Alexander Kristoff	Team Katusha
2016	Norway	Alexander Kristoff	Team Katusha

=== Stage wins ===
Rider	Country	Stages
Tom Boonen	Belgium	22
Mark Cavendish	United Kingdom	9
Alexander Kristoff	Norway	6
Alberto Loddo	Italy	3
Francesco Chicchi	Italy	2
Arnaud Démare	France	2
Heinrich Haussler	Australia; Germany	2
Robert Hunter	South Africa	2
Niki Terpstra	Netherlands	2
Thorsten Wilhelms	Germany	2

== Ladies' past winners ==
Ladies Tour of Qatar

Race details
- Date: February
- Region: Qatar
- Discipline: Road
- Type: Stage race
- Organiser: Amaury Sport Organisation
- Web site: www.letour.fr/us/homepage_courseTQA.html

History
- First edition: 2009
- Editions: 8 (as of 2016)
- First winner: Kirsten Wild (NED)
- Most wins: Kirsten Wild (NED) (4 wins)
- Most recent: Trixi Worrack (GER)

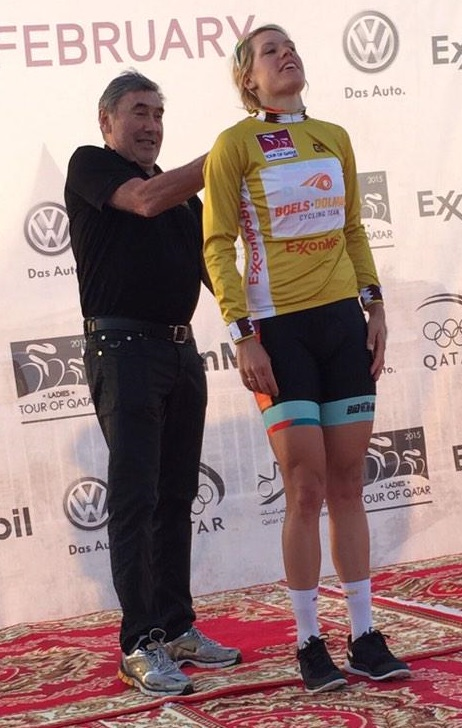
Eddy Merckx presenting Ellen van Dijk with the gold leader's jersey after the first stage of the 2015 Ladies Tour of Qatar.

=== General classification ===
Year	Country	Rider	Team
2009	Netherlands	Kirsten Wild	Cervélo TestTeam
2010	Netherlands	Kirsten Wild	Cervélo TestTeam
2011	Netherlands	Ellen van Dijk	HTC–Highroad Women
2012	Germany	Judith Arndt	Orica–AIS
2013	Netherlands	Kirsten Wild	Argos–Shimano
2014	Netherlands	Kirsten Wild	Giant–Shimano
2015	Great Britain	Lizzie Armitstead	Boels–Dolmans
2016	Germany	Trixi Worrack	Canyon//SRAM

=== Points classification ===
Year	Country	Rider	Team
2009	Netherlands	Kirsten Wild	Cervélo TestTeam
2010	Netherlands	Kirsten Wild	Cervélo TestTeam
2011	Netherlands	Ellen van Dijk	HTC–Highroad Women
2012	Netherlands	Kirsten Wild	Netherlands (national team)
2013	Netherlands	Kirsten Wild	Argos–Shimano
2014	Netherlands	Kirsten Wild	Giant–Shimano
2015	Great Britain	Lizzie Armitstead	Boels–Dolmans
2016	Netherlands	Kirsten Wild	Team Hitec Products

== 2017 Cancellation ==
The 2017 Tour of Qatar was scheduled to take place between 6 and 10 February 2017. However, in December 2016, the event was cancelled due to lack of sponsorship support. It would have been the 16th edition of the race and third event of the 2017 UCI World Tour. It was included in the UCI World Tour calendar for the first time.
