= Geert Steurs =

Belgian cyclist

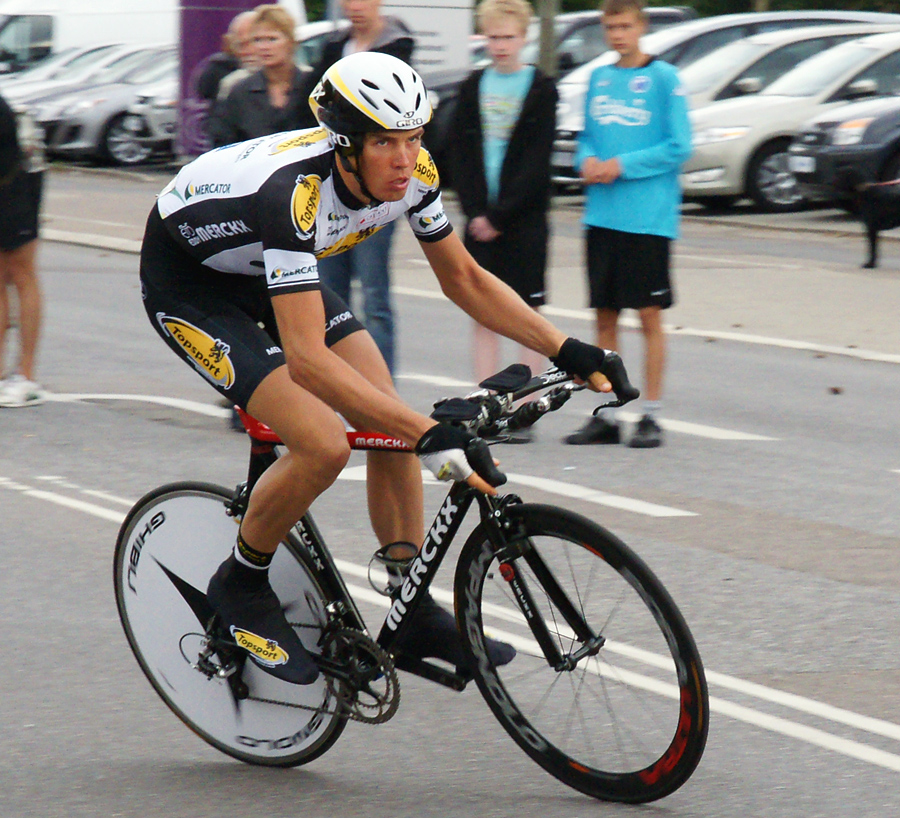

Personal information
- Full name: Geert Steurs
- Born: 24 September 1981 (age 45) Schoten, Belgium
- Height: 1.92 m (6 ft 4 in)
- Weight: 77 kg (170 lb)

Cycling career
- Sport: Cycling
- Current team: Retired
- Discipline: Road
- Role: Rider

Amateur teams
- 2000: Mapei–Latexco
- 2001–2002: Domo–Farm Frites Espoirs
- 2003: Slagino–Go Pass
- 2004: Jong Vlaanderen 2016
- 2006: Pictoflex–Bikeland

Professional teams
- 2007–2008: Predictor–Lotto
- 2009–2011: Topsport Vlaanderen–Mercator

Geert Steurs (born 24 September 1981 in Schoten) is a Belgian professional road bicycle racer, who last rode for Topsport Vlaanderen–Mercator.

== Major results ==
2004
3rd Road race, National Amateur Road Championships
2006
1st Overall Tour of Hong Kong Shanghai

1st Stage 1

2nd Flèche Ardennaise
2nd Circuit de Wallonie
5th Kattekoers
5th Internationale Wielertrofee Jong Maar Moedig
8th Nokere Koerse
2007
3rd Nokere Koerse
2008
6th Halle–Ingooigem
7th Grote Prijs Jef Scherens
9th Grand Prix d'Ouverture La Marseillaise
2009
7th Halle–Ingooigem
9th Overall Sachsen-Tour
2010
2nd Overall Tour of Qatar

1st Stage 2
