= Kurt Hovelijnck =

Belgian cyclist

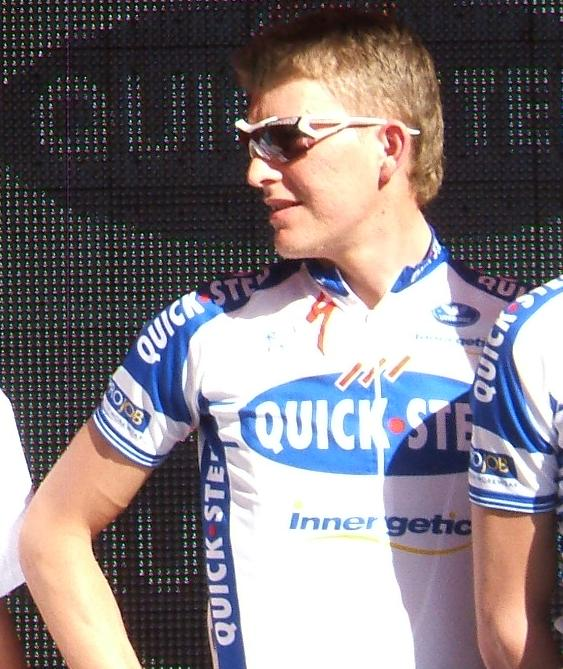
- Hovelijnck at the 2009 Tour Down Under.

Personal information
- Full name: Kurt Hovelijnck
- Born: 2 June 1981 (age 45)
- Height: 1.85 m (6 ft 1 in)
- Weight: 70 kg (150 lb)

Cycling career
- Sport: Cycling
- Current team: Retired
- Discipline: Road
- Role: Rider

Professional teams
- 2005–2008: Chocolade Jacques–T Interim
- 2009–2010: Quick-Step
- 2011: Donckers Koffie-Jelly Belly
- 2012–2013: Landbouwkrediet–Euphony

Kurt Hovelijnck (born 2 June 1981) is a Belgian former professional road bicycle racer, who competed as a professional between 2005 and 2013, competing for the Topsport Vlaanderen, Quick-Step, Donckers Koffie-Jelly Belly and Crelan–Euphony squads.

He fractured his skull during a training accident in Belgium on 17 March 2009, but returned to racing the following February.
