= 2009 in men's road cycling =

In 2009 a number of prominent riders returned to professional cycling. Ivan Basso, Floyd Landis and Michele Scarponi had finished a suspension. Bjorn Leukemans was without a team for over a year due to doping-related allegations, which were proven to be ungrounded. Most notably, seven-time Tour de France winner Lance Armstrong returned after a three-and-half year break, starting his season as a Astana-rider in the Tour Down Under.

The teams Gerolsteiner and Saunier Duval–Scott, both who were connected to some major doping cases in 2008, saw their title sponsors drop out. The Spanish squad found a new sponsor in Fuji Bikes and was granted another ProTour license as Fuji–Servetto. However, race organizer ASO did not invite the team for their races, and they did not participate in the Tour de France. New teams in the ProTour are Garmin–Slipstream from the United States and Team Katusha (built from the former Tinkoff Credit Systems) from Russia. One notable new Pro Continental team, started from scratch, is the Cervélo TestTeam, which managed to sign 2008 Tour de France-winner Carlos Sastre and Norwegian sprinter Thor Hushovd. Like another new Pro Continental team, Vacansoleil from the Netherlands, Katusha and Cervélo immediately proved successful in the early months of the season.

This year's World Championships will be held in Mendrisio, Switzerland.

The UCI ProTour ranking, which was heavily devalued in 2008 due to the withdrawal from the ProTour by the three Grand Tour organizers, was replaced by the UCI World Ranking, based on a new World Calendar - effectively combining the existing 14 ProTour races with the Monuments and Grand Tours that are currently organized as "Historic" races.

== World championships ==
The World Road championships were held in Mendrisio, Switzerland.

Race	Date	Winner	Second	Third
World Championship Road Race	Sep 26	Cadel Evans (AUS)	Alexandr Kolobnev (RUS)	Joaquim Rodríguez (ESP)
World Championship Time Trial	Sep 23	Fabian Cancellara (SUI)	Gustav Larsson (SWE)	Tony Martin (GER)

== Grand Tours ==
Race	Date	Winner	Second	Third
(Italy) Giro d'Italia	May 9 - May 31	Denis Menchov (RUS)	Danilo Di Luca (ITA)	Franco Pellizotti (ITA)
Tour de France	Jul 4 - Jul 26	Alberto Contador (ESP)	Andy Schleck (LUX)	Lance Armstrong (USA)
(Spain) Vuelta a España	Aug 29 - Sep 20	Alejandro Valverde (ESP)	Samuel Sánchez (ESP)	Cadel Evans (AUS)

== UCI ProTour ==
Race	Date	Winner	Second	Third
(Australia) Tour Down Under	Jan 20 - Jan 25	Allan Davis (AUS)	Stuart O'Grady (AUS)	José Joaquín Rojas (ESP)
(Belgium) Tour of Flanders / Tour des Flandres	April 5	Stijn Devolder (BEL)	Heinrich Haussler (GER)	Philippe Gilbert (BEL)
(Spain) Vuelta al País Vasco	Apr 6 - Apr 11	Alberto Contador (ESP)	Antonio Colom (ESP)	Samuel Sánchez (ESP)
(Belgium) Gent–Wevelgem	Apr 8	Edvald Boasson Hagen (NOR)	Aleksandr Kuschynski (BLR)	Matthew Goss (AUS)
(Netherlands) Amstel Gold Race	Apr 19	Serguei Ivanov (RUS)	Karsten Kroon (NED)	Robert Gesink (NED)
(Switzerland) Tour de Romandie	Apr 28 - May 3	Roman Kreuziger (CZE)	Vladimir Karpets (RUS)	Rein Taaramäe (EST)
(Spain) Volta a Catalunya	May 18 - May 24	Alejandro Valverde (ESP)	Dan Martin (IRL)	Haimar Zubeldia (ESP)
(France) Critérium du Dauphiné Libéré	Jun 7 - Jun 14	Alejandro Valverde (ESP)	Cadel Evans (AUS)	Alberto Contador (ESP)
(Switzerland) Tour de Suisse	Jun 13 - Jun 21	Fabian Cancellara (SUI)	Tony Martin (GER)	Roman Kreuziger (CZE)
(Spain) Clásica de San Sebastián	Aug 1	Carlos Barredo (ESP)	Roman Kreuziger (CZE)	Mickaël Delage (FRA)
(Poland) Tour de Pologne	Aug 2 - Aug 8	Alessandro Ballan (ITA)	Daniel Moreno (ESP)	Edvald Boasson Hagen (NOR)
(Germany) Vattenfall Cyclassics	Aug 16	Tyler Farrar (USA)	Matti Breschel (DEN)	Gerald Ciolek (GER)
(Belgium) (Netherlands) (Luxembourg) Eneco Tour	Aug 18 - Aug 25	Edvald Boasson Hagen (NOR)	Sylvain Chavanel (FRA)	Sebastian Langeveld (NED)
GP Ouest-France	Aug 23	Simon Gerrans (AUS)	Pierrick Fédrigo (FRA)	Paul Martens (GER)

== Other World Calendar events ==
These races contribute, along with the Grand Tours and the UCI ProTour races, towards the 2009 UCI World Ranking

Race	Date	Winner	Second	Third
(France) Paris–Nice	Mar 9 - Mar 16	Luis León Sánchez (ESP)	Fränk Schleck (LUX)	Sylvain Chavanel (FRA)
(Italy) Tirreno–Adriatico	Mar 11 - Mar 17	Michele Scarponi (ITA)	Stefano Garzelli (ITA)	Andreas Klöden (GER)
(Italy) Milan – San Remo	Mar 21	Mark Cavendish (GBR)	Heinrich Haussler (GER)	Thor Hushovd (NOR)
(France) Paris–Roubaix	Apr 12	Tom Boonen (BEL)	Filippo Pozzato (ITA)	Thor Hushovd (NOR)
(Belgium) La Flèche Wallonne	Apr 22	Davide Rebellin (ITA)	Andy Schleck (LUX)	Damiano Cunego (ITA)
(Belgium) Liège–Bastogne–Liège	Apr 26	Andy Schleck (LUX)	Joaquim Rodríguez (ESP)	Davide Rebellin (ITA)
(Italy) Giro di Lombardia	Oct 17	Philippe Gilbert (BEL)	Samuel Sánchez (ESP)	Alexandr Kolobnev (RUS)

== 2.HC Category Races ==
The prefix 2 indicates that these events are stage races.

Race	Date	Winner	Second	Third
(Malaysia) Tour de Langkawi	Feb 9 - Feb 15	José Serpa (COL)	Jai Crawford (AUS)	Jackson Rodríguez (VEN)
(United States) Tour of California	Feb 14 - Feb 22	Levi Leipheimer (USA)	David Zabriskie (USA)	Michael Rogers (AUS)
(France) Critérium International	Mar 28 - Mar 29	Jens Voigt (GER)	František Raboň (CZE)	Danny Pate (USA)
(Belgium) Three Days of De Panne	Mar 31 - Apr 2	Frederik Willems (BEL)	Joost Posthuma (NED)	Tom Leezer (NED)
(France) Four Days of Dunkirk	May 6 - May 11	Rui Costa (POR)	David Lelay (FRA)	Cyril Lemoine (FRA)
Tour of Belgium	May 27 - May 31	Lars Boom (NED)	Bram Tankink (NED)	Dominique Cornu (BEL)
(Germany) Bayern-Rundfahrt	May 27 - May 31	Linus Gerdemann (GER)	Maxime Monfort (BEL)	David Lelay (FRA)
Tour de Luxembourg	Jun 3 - Jun 7	Fränk Schleck (LUX)	Andreas Klöden (GER)	Marco Marcato (ITA)
Tour of Austria	July 5 - July 12	Michael Albasini (SUI)	Ruslan Pidgornyy (UKR)	Stanislau Samoilav (BLR)
(China) Tour of Qinghai Lake	July 17–26	Andrey Mizurov (KAZ)	Ghader Mizbani (IRI)	Mitja Mahoric (SLO)
(Belgium) Tour de Wallonie	July 25 - July 29	Julien El Fares (FRA)	Pavel Brutt (RUS)	Alexander Kolobnev (RUS)
Tour of Denmark	July 29 - Aug 2	Jakob Fuglsang (DEN)	Maurizio Biondo (ITA)	Roger Hammond (GBR)
(Spain) Vuelta a Burgos	Aug 5 - Aug 9	Alejandro Valverde (ESP)	Xavier Tondo (ESP)	Tom Danielson (USA)
Volta a Portugal	Aug 5 - Aug 16	Nuno Ribeiro (POR)	David Blanco (ESP)	David Bernabeu (ESP)
(United States) Tour of Missouri	Sep 7 - Sep 13	David Zabriskie (USA)	Gustav Larsson (SWE)	Marco Pinotti (ITA)

== 1.HC Category Races ==
The prefix 1 indicates that these events are one-day races.

Race	Date	Winner	Second	Third
(Belgium) Omloop Het Nieuwsblad	Feb 28	Thor Hushovd (NOR)	Kevyn Ista (BEL)	Juan Antonio Flecha (ESP)
(Belgium) E3 Prijs Vlaanderen	Mar 29	Filippo Pozzato (ITA)	Tom Boonen (BEL)	Maxim Iglinsky (KAZ)
(Spain) GP Miguel Indurain	Apr 4	David de la Fuente (ESP)	Alexandr Kolobnev (RUS)	Fabian Wegmann (GER)
(Belgium) Scheldeprijs	Apr 15	Alessandro Petacchi (ITA)	Kenny van Hummel (NED)	Dominique Rollin (CAN)
(Germany) Eschborn-Frankfurt City Loop	May 1	Fabian Wegmann (GER)	Karsten Kroon (NED)	Christian Knees (GER)
(Netherlands) Dutch Food Valley Classic	May 16	Kenny van Hummel (NED)	Graeme Brown (AUS)	Steven de Jongh (NED)
(Switzerland) Grand Prix of Aargau Canton	Jun 7	Peter Velits (SVK)	Ben Hermans (BEL)	Heinrich Haussler (GER)
(United States) Philadelphia International Championship	Jun 7	André Greipel (GER)	Greg Henderson (NZL)	Kirk O'Bee (USA)
(Italy) Tre Valli Varesine	Aug 18	Mauro Santambrogio (ITA)	Francesco Masciarelli (ITA)	Alexander Bocharov (RUS)
(Italy) Giro del Veneto	Aug 29	Filippo Pozzato (ITA)	Carlo Scognamiglio (ITA)	Luca Paolini (ITA)
(Belgium) Paris-Bruxelles	Sep 12	Matthew Goss (AUS)	Allan Davis (AUS)	Kristof Goddaert (BEL)
(France) GP de Fourmies	Sep 13	Romain Feillu (FRA)	Manuel Belletti (ITA)	Yauheni Hutarovich (BLR)
(Italy) Giro dell'Emilia	Oct 10	Robert Gesink (NED)	Jakob Fuglsang (DEN)	Thomas Lövkvist (SWE)
(France) Paris–Tours	Oct 11	Philippe Gilbert (BEL)	Tom Boonen (BEL)	Borut Božič (SLO)
(Italy) Giro del Piemonte	Oct 15	Philippe Gilbert (BEL)	Daniel Moreno (ESP)	Francesco Gavazzi (ITA)

== National Championships ==
See 2009 national cycling championships.

== See also ==
- 2009 in women's road cycling
