= 2009 UCI World Ranking =

- First edition of the UCI World Ranking

Details
- Dates: 20 January – 17 October
- Location: Europe and Australia
- Races: 24

Champions
- Individual champion: Alberto Contador (ESP) (Astana)
- Teams' champion: Astana
- Nations' champion: Spain

The 2009 UCI World Ranking was the first edition of the ranking system launched by the Union Cycliste Internationale (UCI), replacing the rankings previously part of the UCI ProTour, with which it would be merged in 2011 to form the UCI World Tour. The series started with the Tour Down Under's opening stage on 20 January, and consists of 13 stage races and 11 one-day races, culminating in the Giro di Lombardia on 17 October. All events except the Tour Down Under took place in Europe.

The individual ranking was topped by Alberto Contador, who took the lead after his win in the Tour de France and was assured of winning the classification when second-placed Alejandro Valverde was absent from the final race of the series. Contador's Astana team took the team title, with Valverde again second as leader of Caisse d'Epargne, and with a third Spaniard, Samuel Sánchez, completing the top three in the individual classification, Spain won the national rankings by a wide margin over second placed Italy.

== Events ==
All 14 events of the 2009 UCI ProTour were included in the series calendar, along with the three Grand Tours, two early season stage races, and five one-day classics.

Race	Date	Winner	Second	Third	Other points (4th place onwards)	Stage points
(Australia) Tour Down Under	Jan 20 – Jan 25	Allan Davis (AUS) (100 pts)	Stuart O'Grady (AUS) (80 pts)	José Joaquín Rojas (ESP) (70 pts)	60, 50, 40, 30, 20, 10, 4	6, 4, 2, 1, 1
(France) Paris–Nice	Mar 8 – Mar 15	Luis León Sánchez (ESP) (100 pts)	Fränk Schleck (LUX) (80 pts)	Sylvain Chavanel (FRA) (70 pts)	60, 50, 40, 30, 20, 10, 4	6, 4, 2, 1, 1
(Italy) Tirreno–Adriatico	Mar 11 – Mar 17	Michele Scarponi (ITA) (100 pts)	Stefano Garzelli (ITA) (80 pts)	Andreas Klöden (GER) (70 pts)	60, 50, 40, 30, 20, 10, 4	6, 4, 2, 1, 1
(Italy) Milan–San Remo	Mar 21	Mark Cavendish (GBR) (100 pts)	Heinrich Haussler (GER) (80 pts)	Thor Hushovd (NOR) (70 pts)	60, 50, 40, 30, 20, 10, 4	N/A
(Belgium) Tour of Flanders	April 5	Stijn Devolder (BEL) (100 pts)	Heinrich Haussler (GER) (80 pts)	Philippe Gilbert (BEL) (70 pts)	60, 50, 40, 30, 20, 10, 4	N/A
(Spain) Tour of the Basque Country	Apr 6 – Apr 11	Alberto Contador (ESP) (100 pts)	Antonio Colom (ESP) (80 pts)	Samuel Sánchez (ESP) (70 pts)	60, 50, 40, 30, 20, 10, 4	6, 4, 2, 1, 1
(Belgium) Gent–Wevelgem	Apr 8	Edvald Boasson Hagen (NOR) (80 pts)	Aleksandr Kuschynski (BLR) (60 pts)	Matthew Goss (AUS) (50 pts)	40, 30, 22, 14, 10, 6, 2	N/A
(France) Paris–Roubaix	Apr 12	Tom Boonen (BEL) (100 pts)	Filippo Pozzato (ITA) (80 pts)	Thor Hushovd (NOR) (70 pts)	60, 50, 40, 30, 20, 10, 4	N/A
(Netherlands) Amstel Gold Race	Apr 19	Sergei Ivanov (RUS) (80 pts)	Karsten Kroon (NED) (60 pts)	Robert Gesink (NED) (50 pts)	40, 30, 22, 14, 10, 6, 2	N/A
(Belgium) La Flèche Wallonne	Apr 23	Davide Rebellin (ITA) (80 pts)	Andy Schleck (LUX) (60 pts)	Damiano Cunego (ITA) (50 pts)	40, 30, 22, 14, 10, 6, 2	N/A
(Belgium) Liège–Bastogne–Liège	Apr 26	Andy Schleck (LUX) (100 pts)	Joaquim Rodríguez (ESP) (80 pts)	Davide Rebellin (ITA) (70 pts)	60, 50, 40, 30, 20, 10, 4	N/A
(Switzerland) Tour de Romandie	Apr 28 – May 3	Roman Kreuziger (CZE) (100 pts)	Vladimir Karpets (RUS) (80 pts)	Rein Taaramäe (EST) (70 pts)	60, 50, 40, 30, 20, 10, 4	6, 4, 2, 1, 1
(Italy) Giro d'Italia	May 9–31	Denis Menchov (RUS) (170 pts)	Danilo Di Luca (ITA) (130 pts)	Franco Pellizotti (ITA) (100 pts)	90, 80, 70, 60, 52, 44, 38, 32, 26, 22 18, 14, 10, 8, 6, 4, 2	16, 8, 4, 2, 1
(Spain) Volta a Catalunya	May 18–24	Alejandro Valverde (ESP) (100 pts)	Dan Martin (IRE) (80 pts)	Haimar Zubeldia (ESP) (70 pts)	60, 50, 40, 30, 20, 10, 4	6, 4, 2, 1, 1
(France) Critérium du Dauphiné Libéré	Jun 7 – Jun 14	Alejandro Valverde (ESP) (100 pts)	Cadel Evans (AUS) (80 pts)	Alberto Contador (ESP) (70 pts)	60, 50, 40, 30, 20, 10, 4	6, 4, 2, 1, 1
(Switzerland) Tour de Suisse	Jun 13 – Jun 21	Fabian Cancellara (SUI) (100 pts)	Tony Martin (GER) (80 pts)	Roman Kreuziger (CZE) (70 pts)	60, 50, 40, 30, 20, 10, 4	6, 4, 2, 1, 1
Tour de France	Jul 4 – Jul 26	Alberto Contador (ESP) (200 pts)	Andy Schleck (LUX) (150 pts)	Lance Armstrong (USA) (120 pts)	110, 100, 90, 80, 70, 60, 50, 40, 30, 24, 20, 16, 12, 10, 8, 6, 4	20, 10, 6,4, 2
(Spain) Clásica de San Sebastián	Aug 1	Carlos Barredo (ESP) (80 pts)	Roman Kreuziger (CZE) (60 pts)	Mickaël Delage (FRA) (50 pts)	40, 30, 22, 14, 10, 6, 2	N/A
(Poland) Tour de Pologne	Aug 2 – Aug 8	Alessandro Ballan (ITA) (100 pts)	Daniel Moreno (ESP) (80 pts)	Edvald Boasson Hagen (NOR) (70 pts)	60, 50, 40, 30, 20, 10, 4	6, 4, 2, 1, 1
(Germany) Vattenfall Cyclassics	Aug 16	Tyler Farrar (USA) (80 pts)	Matti Breschel (DEN) (60 pts)	Gerald Ciolek (GER) (50 pts)	40, 30, 22, 14, 10, 6, 2	N/A
(Belgium) (Netherlands) Eneco Tour	Aug 19 – Aug 26	Edvald Boasson Hagen (NOR) (100 pts)	Sylvain Chavanel (FRA) (80 pts)	Sebastian Langeveld (NED) (70 pts)	60, 50, 40, 30, 20, 10, 4	6, 4, 2, 1, 1
GP Ouest-France	Aug 23	Simon Gerrans (AUS) (80 pts)	Pierrick Fédrigo (FRA) (60 pts)	Paul Martens (GER) (50 pts)	40, 30, 22, 14, 10, 6, 2	N/A
(Spain) Vuelta a España	Aug 29 – Sep 20	Alejandro Valverde (ESP) (170 pts)	Samuel Sánchez (ESP) (130 pts)	Cadel Evans (AUS) (100 pts)	90, 80, 70, 60, 52, 44, 38, 32, 26, 22 18, 14, 10, 8, 6, 4, 2	16, 8, 4, 2, 1
(Italy) Giro di Lombardia	Oct 17	Philippe Gilbert (BEL) (100 pts)	Samuel Sánchez (ESP) (80 pts)	Alexandr Kolobnev (RUS) (70 pts)	60, 50, 40, 30, 20, 10, 4	N/A

== Final standings ==
=== Individual ===
Rank	Name	Team	Points
1	Alberto Contador (ESP)	Astana	527
2	Alejandro Valverde (ESP)	Caisse d'Epargne	483
3	Samuel Sánchez (ESP)	Euskaltel–Euskadi	357
4	Andy Schleck (LUX)	Team Saxo Bank	334
5	Cadel Evans (AUS)	Silence–Lotto	333
6	Edvald Boasson Hagen (NOR)	Team Columbia–HTC	322
7	Roman Kreuziger (CZE)	Liquigas	319
8	Mark Cavendish (GBR)	Team Columbia–HTC	304
9	Philippe Gilbert (BEL)	Silence–Lotto	295
10	Robert Gesink (NED)	Rabobank	266
11	Allan Davis (AUS)	Quick-Step	249
12	Damiano Cunego (ITA)	Lampre–NGC	235
13	Andreas Klöden (GER)	Astana	232
14	Ivan Basso (ITA)	Liquigas	229
15	Denis Menchov (RUS)	Rabobank	218
16	Heinrich Haussler (GER)	Cervélo TestTeam	217
17	Thor Hushovd (NOR)	Cervélo TestTeam	216
18	Tyler Farrar (USA)	Garmin–Slipstream	212
19	Fränk Schleck (LUX)	Team Saxo Bank	212
20	Luis León Sánchez (ESP)	Caisse d'Epargne	211

- 267 riders scored at least one point on the 2009 UCI World Ranking.

=== Team ===
Team rankings are calculated by adding the ranking points of the top five riders of a team in the table.

Rank	Team	Points	Top five riders
1	Astana	1100	Contador (527), Klöden (232), Armstrong (150), Zubeldia (112), Leipheimer (79)
2	Caisse d'Epargne	1048	Valverde (483), Sánchez (211), Rodríguez (147), Moreno (117), Rojas (90)
3	Team Columbia–HTC	957	Boasson Hagen (322), Cavendish (304), Martin (125), Rogers (115), Greipel (91)
4	Team Saxo Bank	946	A. Schleck (334), F. Schleck (212), Cancellara (180), Breschel (117), Kolobnev (103)
5	Liquigas	923	Kreuziger (319), Basso (229), Pellizotti (156), Nibali (135), Bennati (84)
6	Silence–Lotto	821	Evans (333), Gilbert (295), Van Den Broeck (83), Hoste (60), Delage (50)
7	Cervélo TestTeam	804	Haussler (217), Hushovd (216), Gerrans (176), Sastre (134), Deignan (61)
8	Quick-Step	760	Davis (249), Chavanel (194), Boonen (133), Devolder (104), Barredo (80)
9	Rabobank	707	Gesink (266), Menchov (218), Flecha (85), Langeveld (76), Weening (62)
10	Team Katusha	637	Ivanov (164), Karpets (157), Colom (145)†, Pozzato (154), Ignatiev (17)
11	Garmin–Slipstream	632	Farrar (212), Martin (137), Wiggins (131), Vandevelde (78), Hesjedal (74)
12	Euskaltel–Euskadi	631	Sánchez (357), Astarloza (178)†, Fernandez (56), Galdós (30), Txurruka (10)

- 34 teams have at least one point

=== Nation ===
Final standing. National rankings are calculated by adding the ranking points of the top five riders registered in a nation in the table. The top 10 nations after the 2009 Tour de Pologne became eligible to enter 9 riders to the 2009 UCI Road World Championships, and any nation with at least one rider in the top 100 eligible to enter a team of three.

Rank	Nation	Points	Top five riders
1	Spain	1756	Contador (527), Valverde (483), S. Sánchez (357), L. Sánchez (211), Astarloza (178)†
2	Italy	984	Cunego (235), Ivan Basso (229), Rebellin (194)†, Garzelli (170), Pellizotti (156)
3	Australia	960	Evans (333), Davis (249), Gerrans (176), Rogers (115), O'Grady (87)
4	Germany	753	Klöden (232), Haussler (217), Martin (125), Greipel (91), Ciolek (88)
5	Belgium	675	Gilbert (295), Boonen (133), Devolder (104), Van Den Broeck (83), Hoste (60)
6	Russia	660	Menchov (218), Ivanov (164), Karpets (157), Kolobnev (103), Trofimov (18)
7	Luxembourg	563	A. Schleck (334), F. Schleck (212), Kirchen (17)
8	Netherlands	544	Gesink (266), Hoogerland (76), Langeveld (76), Maaskant (64), Weening (62)
9	Norway	538	Boasson Hagen (322), Hushovd (216)
10	United States	528	Farrar (212), Armstrong (150), Leipheimer (79), Vande Velde (78), Hincapie (9)

- Riders from 34 nations earned at least one point.

† The names of six riders under suspension for drug test failures, including Astarloza, Colom and Rebellin, were removed from the individual rankings, but the points earned before suspension are still credited to their teams and nations.

== Leader progress ==
Event (Winner)	Individual	Team	Nation
Tour Down Under (Allan Davis)	Allan Davis	Quick-Step	Australia
Paris–Nice (Luis León Sánchez)	Allan Davis	Quick-Step	Spain
Tirreno–Adriatico (Michele Scarponi)	Allan Davis	Quick-Step	Spain
Milan–San Remo (Mark Cavendish)	Allan Davis	Quick-Step	Australia
Tour of Flanders (Stijn Devolder)	Allan Davis	Quick-Step	Australia
Gent–Wevelgem (Edvald Boasson Hagen)	Allan Davis	Quick-Step	Australia
Vuelta al País Vasco (Alberto Contador)	Alberto Contador	Quick-Step	Spain
Paris–Roubaix (Tom Boonen)	Heinrich Haussler	Quick-Step	Spain
Amstel Gold Race (Sergei Ivanov)	Heinrich Haussler	Quick-Step	Spain
La Flèche Wallonne (Davide Rebellin)	Heinrich Haussler	Quick-Step	Spain
Liège–Bastogne–Liège (Andy Schleck)	Heinrich Haussler	Quick-Step	Spain
Tour de Romandie (Roman Kreuziger)	Heinrich Haussler	Quick-Step	Spain
Volta a Catalunya (Alejandro Valverde)	Allan Davis	Caisse d'Epargne	Spain
Giro d'Italia (Denis Menchov)	Denis Menchov	Cervélo TestTeam	Italy
Critérium du Dauphiné Libéré (Alejandro Valverde)	Alejandro Valverde	Caisse d'Epargne	Spain
Tour de Suisse (Fabian Cancellara)	Alejandro Valverde	Caisse d'Epargne	Spain
Tour de France (Alberto Contador)	Alberto Contador	Astana	Spain
Clásica de San Sebastián (Carlos Barredo)	Alberto Contador	Astana	Spain
Tour de Pologne (Alessandro Ballan)	Alberto Contador	Astana	Spain
Vattenfall Cyclassics (Tyler Farrar)	Alberto Contador	Astana	Spain
GP Ouest-France (Simon Gerrans)	Alberto Contador	Astana	Spain
Eneco Tour (Edvald Boasson Hagen)	Alberto Contador	Astana	Spain
Vuelta a España (Alejandro Valverde)	Alberto Contador	Astana	Spain
Giro di Lombardia (Philippe Gilbert)	Alberto Contador	Astana	Spain
