= Andy Schleck =

Luxembourgish former road bicycle racer

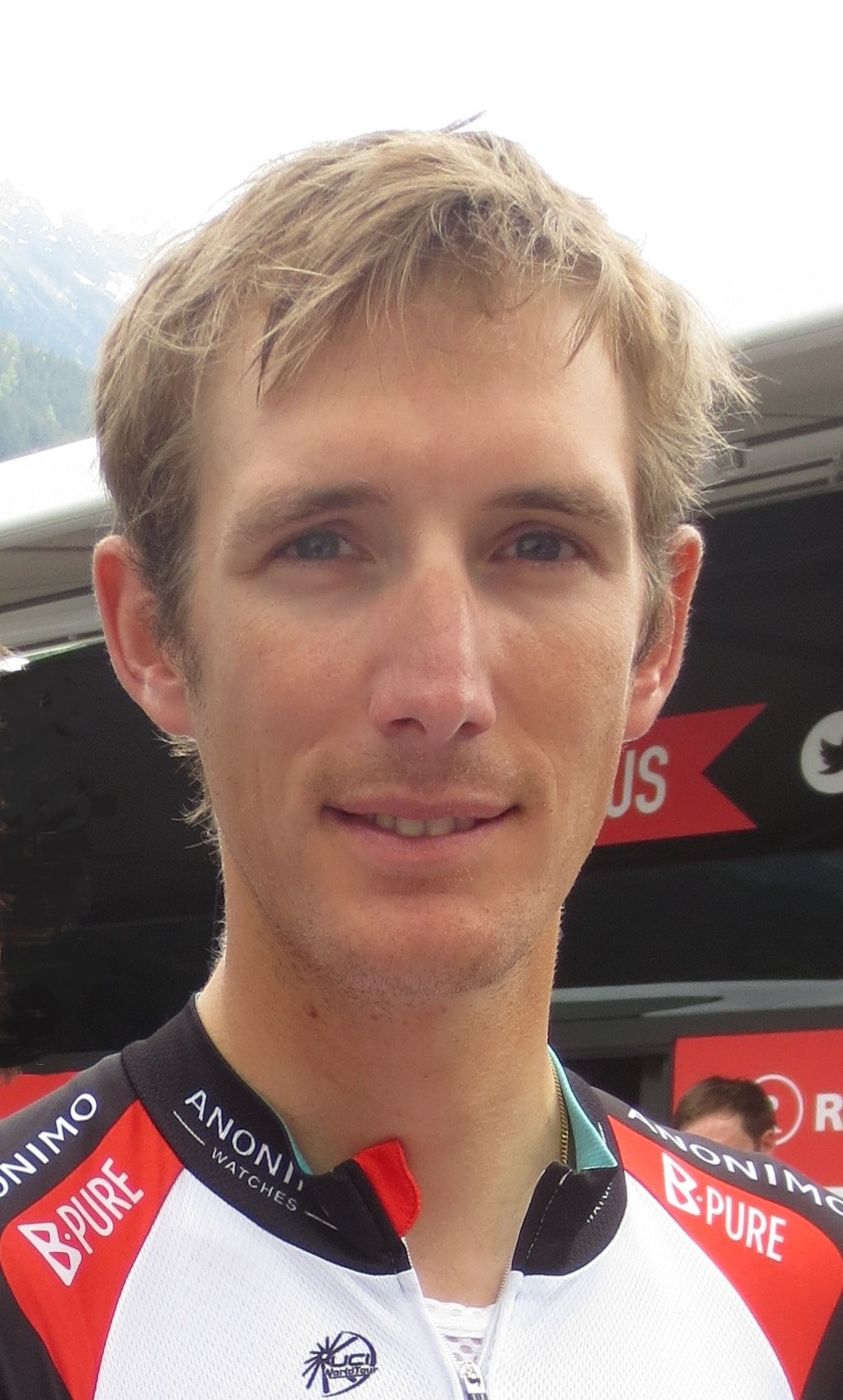
- Schleck at the 2013 Tour de Suisse

Personal information
- Full name: Andy Raymond Schleck
- Born: 10 June 1985 (age 41) Luxembourg City, Luxembourg
- Height: 1.86 m (6 ft 1 in)
- Weight: 68 kg (150 lb; 10 st 10 lb)

Cycling career
- Sport: Cycling
- Current team: Retired
- Discipline: Road
- Role: Rider
- Rider type: Climber

Amateur teams
- 2004: VC Roubaix
- 2004: Team CSC (stagiaire)

Professional teams
- 2005–2010: Team CSC
- 2011–2014: Leopard Trek

Major wins
- Grand Tours Tour de France General classification (2010) Young rider classification (2008, 2009, 2010) 3 individual stages (2010, 2011) Giro d'Italia Young rider classification (2007) One-day races and Classics National Time Trial Championships (2005, 2010) National Road Race Championships (2009) Liège–Bastogne–Liège (2009)

Andy Raymond Schleck (pronounced [ˈɑndi ˈʀɑɪ̯mont ˈʃlæk]; born 10 June 1985) is a Luxembourgish former professional road bicycle racer. He won the 2010 Tour de France, being awarded it retroactively in February 2012 after Alberto Contador's hearing at the Court of Arbitration for Sport. He has also been the runner-up at the Tour twice; in 2009 and 2011. He's the current deputy general manager for the Lidl-Trek (men's team). He is the younger brother of Fränk Schleck, also a professional rider between 2003 and 2016. Their father Johny Schleck rode the Tour de France and Vuelta a España between 1965 and 1974.

== Early years and family ==
Andy Raymond Schleck was born in Luxembourg City, Luxembourg, and is the youngest of Gaby and Johny Schleck's three sons. His older brother Fränk Schleck was also a cyclist on Trek Factory Racing, and his oldest brother Steve Schleck is a Green party politician who has served as an alderman in Mondorf-les-Bains. Andy's father, Johny Schleck, is a former professional cyclist and rode the Tour de France at the service of 1968 winner Jan Janssen and 1973 winner Luis Ocaña, and also managed to finish in the top 20 twice: 19th in 1970 and 20th in 1967. He won a stage in the 1970 Vuelta a España and the Luxembourg National Championships. Johny's father, Gustav Schleck, also contested events in the 1930s.

== Career ==
=== Amateur career ===
Andy Schleck joined the VC Roubaix cycling club in 2004, and caught the attention of Cyrille Guimard, a sports director who became famous as the directeur sportif for several Tour de France winners, including Bernard Hinault, Laurent Fignon, Lucien Van Impe and American Greg LeMond. Guimard described Schleck as one of the biggest talents he had seen and compared him to Laurent Fignon.

Still an amateur, Schleck won the 2004 Flèche du Sud stage race at 18. As the Danish national team were in the race, word spread to the Danish Team CSC manager Bjarne Riis. Riis asked Fränk, already on Team CSC, about his brother, and Andy started as a stagiaire for Team CSC on 1 September 2004.

=== Team CSC (2005–2010) ===
==== 2005–2008 ====
Schleck secured a professional contract with Team CSC in 2005, and made his debut in a ProTour race at age 19, in the 2005 Volta a Catalunya.

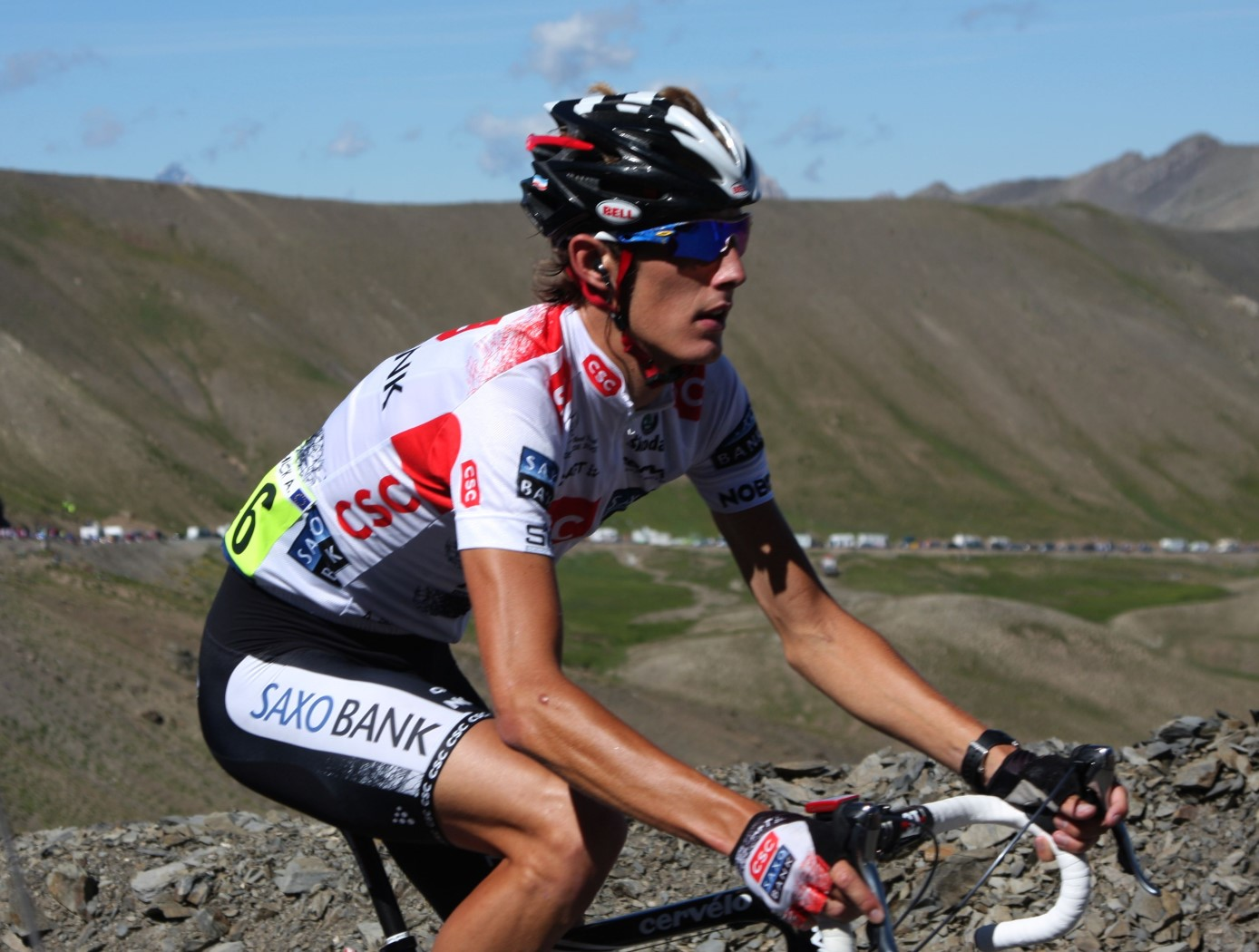
Schleck at the 2008 Tour de France

He and Fränk shared the 2005 National Championships, Fränk taking the road race and Andy the individual time trial. In 2006, Schleck crashed in the GP Cholet and took an eight-week break before returning for the Volta a Catalunya in May. In July, a few days after his brother won the Alpe d'Huez stage of the Tour de France, Andy won the major mountain stage in the Sachsen Tour, followed by the final stage, finishing 23rd overall.

In 2007, he won the young rider classification in the Giro d'Italia and was second in the general classification behind Danilo Di Luca. He finished fourth at the Giro di Lombardia after helping his brother Fränk, who crashed with six kilometres to go.

In 2008, Schleck finished 4th in the Liège–Bastogne–Liège. His success continued in the Tour de France, in which he finished 12th overall, winning the young rider classification ahead of Roman Kreuziger and helping CSC win the team classification and Carlos Sastre the maillot jaune.

==== 2009 ====
In 2009 he achieved the biggest victory of his career at that point, when a strong April culminated with an impressive victory in Liège–Bastogne–Liège, as he became the first winner of the race from Luxembourg since Marcel Ernzer in 1954. A few days before he had finished runner-up in La Flèche Wallonne.

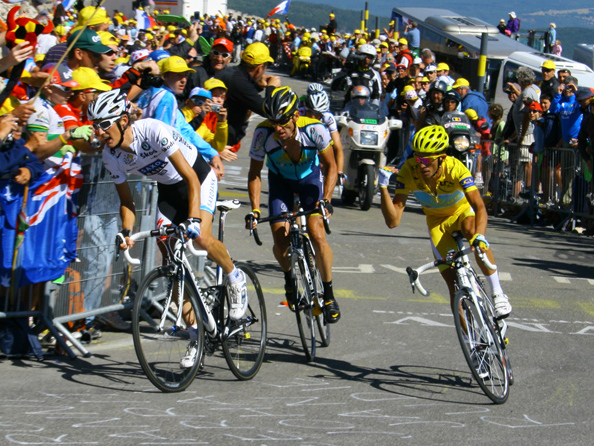
Schleck wearing the white jersey at the 2009 Tour de France; he leads Lance Armstrong and Alberto Contador during the climb of Mont Ventoux.

In the Tour de France, he finished the race in second place, behind Alberto Contador and ahead of Bradley Wiggins, along with finishing Stage 17 in 3rd place behind his brother Fränk Schleck, who won the stage, and Contador. He again won the young rider classification in the process.

==== 2010 ====
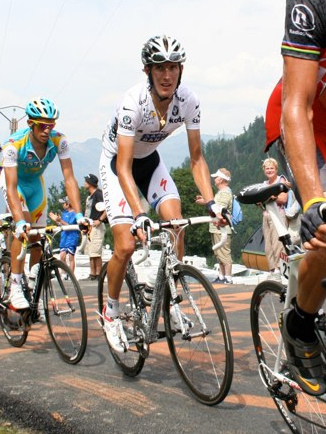
Schleck at the 2010 Tour de France; he is wearing the white jersey of the young rider classification leader.

In the Tour de France, he was much closer to the victory – against Alberto Contador again – but took what was at the time second place (by 39 seconds) and won the young rider classification for the third time in a row. Schleck was involved in a controversial incident on the Port de Balès during stage 15 while wearing the maillot jaune and attempting to extend his lead. He was riding with incredibly good form and with 24 km to go Schleck attacked at the front of the group of favorites dropping some riders but the main favorites contained this initial attack. With 22 km to go he attacked again and initially there was no response from his rivals but almost immediately his chain fell off. His main rival for the Tour, Alberto Contador, did not stop even though he likely knew that Schleck had a mechanical issue and had not cracked. Samuel Sánchez and Denis Menchov attacked as well leaving Schleck behind as Contador took the lead from Schleck. Some sections of the media saw Contador's behaviour as unsporting and felt he should have allowed Schleck to regain the lost time. However, some sections of the media and members of the peloton did not have a problem with Contador's attack. The incident also produced the iconic quote "If you draw your sword and you drop it, you die", from Ryder Hesjedal. Schleck lost 39 seconds on that stage in the mountains, the same number of seconds by which he eventually lost the Tour de France. Schleck was only the second man to ever win the white jersey for best young rider 3 times; the first was Jan Ullrich who won between 1996 and 1998. He also won two mountain stages, and rode in the yellow jersey for six days.

In February 2012 after Contador's CAS hearing Schleck was retroactively awarded the 2010 Title.

=== Leopard Trek (2011–2014) ===
On 29 July 2010, Schleck and his brother Fränk announced their departure from Team Saxo Bank at the end of 2010. They formed a brand-new Luxembourg-based team with former Saxo Bank director Kim Andersen. Alberto Contador was hired to replace Andy Schleck as part of a two-year contract signed with Team Saxo Bank. In October 2010, the management of the new Luxembourg team revealed the team's website, labeled Leopard True Racing, leading to speculation that the team would race under that name. The team's name, was later announced by Jakob Fuglsang as Leopard Trek.

==== 2011 ====
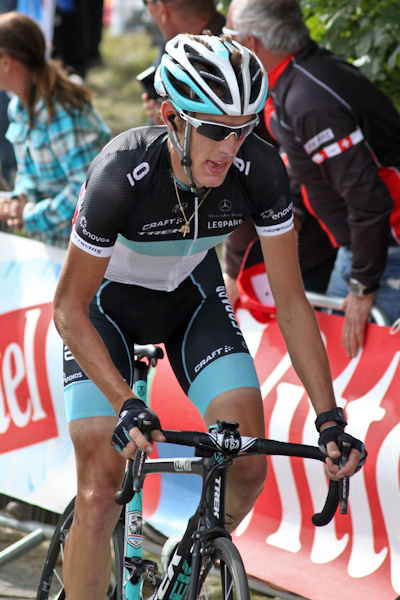
Schleck at the 2011 Tour de France

In April 2011, Schleck finished third in Liège–Bastogne–Liège. He then won the mountains classification of the Tour de Suisse. In the Tour de France, Schleck had a slow start but came to the mountains 5th overall. Through the Pyrenees Andy moved up to 4th overall. After losing almost 2 minutes on Stage 16, he finally won the mountainous 18th stage of the race on the Col du Galibier with a long solo breakaway ride. The day after, he finished 9th overall in the 19th stage of Alpe d'Huez to take the yellow jersey from Thomas Voeckler, but he was overtaken by Cadel Evans in the penultimate stage of the tour, an individual time trial, placing Schleck in second place going into the final stage in Paris once again. His brother, Frank, also made the podium making them the first siblings ever to both make the podium in Tour history.

==== 2012 ====
For the 2012 season, Leopard Trek merged with Team RadioShack to create RadioShack–Nissan, with Johan Bruyneel becoming team manager. In May, Schleck was awarded the overall classification win at the 2010 Tour de France after original winner Alberto Contador lost his legal battle relating to a doping offence. The ceremony was held in his home country of Luxembourg. At the Critérium du Dauphiné prologue, Schleck criticized Bruyneel for having spoken critically to the media of both Schleck brothers, saying that those matters should be dealt with internally, not in the media. In the race itself, Schleck had to abandon after losing a significant amount of time on the general classification and crashing heavily on the fourth stage individual time trial, worsening a knee injury and suffering a fracture of the sacrum. He stated that he still had ample time to prepare adequately for the coming Tour de France, as it occurred often in recent years that he did not perform well in the races leading to the Tour. On 13 June Schleck announced that he would not start in the Tour de France because of the injuries sustained at the Critérium du Dauphiné.

In October he attempted a comeback in the Tour of Beijing.

==== 2013 ====
Schleck competed in the Tour Down Under, but had to withdraw on the final stage due to mechanical issues. He was nearly 40 minutes behind the leader in the general classification, and as such, would have finished last. Finishing 91st at the Gran Premio Città di Camaiore in February, Schleck completed his first UCI-categorised race since the 2012 Liège–Bastogne–Liège, a little less than a year later. Schleck, however, withdrew again at Tirreno–Adriatico, the Tour Méditerranéen, and the Tour of Oman, but managed to finish 57th at the Critérium International. Following the Critérium International, Schleck was again unable to finish at the Amstel Gold Race, although he later finished 86th at La Flèche Wallonne, 41st at Liège–Bastogne–Liège, and 25th at the Tour of California. Schleck then rode the Tour de Suisse in preparation for the Tour de France. While only finishing 40th in Switzerland, Schleck rode a season best of 20th at the Tour de France.

== Retirement ==
Schleck abandoned the 2014 Tour de France, suffering with injuries sustained as a result of a crash during stage three.

In October 2014, Schleck announced his retirement, citing a knee injury. In March 2015 Schleck announced plans to open a bike shop and café in Itzig, Luxembourg. The shop opened in February 2016, and also includes a small museum with souvenirs from Schleck's racing career.

In December 2025, Lidl-Trek announced Schleck as a new deputy general manager that will work across much of the organization.

== Equipment ==
Schleck used 172.5mm crank arms on his bike, which were considered small for a man of his height.

== Career achievements ==
=== Major results ===
Schleck's signed Yellow Jersey from 2011

2002
4th Classique des Alpes
5th Overall Grand Prix Rüebliland
8th Overall Grand Prix Général Patton
2003
1st Road race, National Junior Road Championships
2nd Overall Tour de Lorraine Juniors

1st Mountains classification

3rd Classique des Alpes
6th Vlaams-Brabantse Pijl–Korbeek-lo
9th Overall Grand Prix Général Patton
2004
National Under-23 Road Championships

1st Road race
1st Time trial

1st Overall Flèche du Sud
3rd Overall Grand Prix Guillaume Tell
7th Overall Circuit des Ardennes
10th Rund um den Henninger Turm
2005
National Road Championships

1st Time trial
3rd Road race

7th Grand Prix de Wallonie
9th Overall Four Days of Dunkirk
2006
Sachsen Tour

1st Stages 3 & 5

3rd Road race, National Road Championships
8th Overall Tour of Britain

1st Mountains classification

10th GP Industria & Artigianato di Larciano
2007
1st Stage 2 (TTT) Deutschland Tour
National Road Championships

2nd Time trial
5th Road race

2nd Overall Giro d'Italia

1st Young rider classification

4th Giro di Lombardia
8th Overall Tour de Romandie
2008
1st Stage 1 (TTT) Tour de Pologne
1st Young rider classification, Tour de France
4th Road race, Olympic Games
4th Liège–Bastogne–Liège
5th Road race, National Road Championships
6th Overall Tour de Suisse
9th Rund um den Henninger Turm
2009
1st Road race, National Road Championships
1st Liège–Bastogne–Liège
1st Stage 2 Tour de Luxembourg
2nd Overall Tour de France

1st Young rider classification

2nd La Flèche Wallonne
4th UCI World Ranking
8th Monte Paschi Strade Bianche
10th Amstel Gold Race
2010
National Road Championships

1st Time trial
2nd Road race

1st Overall Tour de France

1st Young rider classification
1st Stages 8 & 17

5th Liège–Bastogne–Liège
8th La Flèche Wallonne
9th UCI World Ranking
2011
1st RaboRonde Heerlen
1st Mountains classification, Tour de Suisse
2nd Road race, National Road Championships
2nd Overall Tour de France

1st Stage 18
Held after Stage 19
Combativity Award Stage 18

3rd Liège–Bastogne–Liège
8th Overall Tour of California
2014
3rd Road race, National Road Championships

=== Grand Tour general classification results timeline ===
| Grand Tour | 2005 | 2006 | 2007 | 2008 | 2009 | 2010 | 2011 | 2012 | 2013 | 2014 |
|---|---|---|---|---|---|---|---|---|---|---|
| Giro d'Italia | — | — | 2 | — | — | — | — | — | — | — |
| Tour de France | — | — | — | 12 | 2 | 1 (Note: Awarded retroactively by the Court of Arbitration for Sport (CAS)) | 2 | — | 20 | DNF |
| / Vuelta a España | — | — | — | — | DNF | DNF | — | — | — | — |

=== Monuments results timeline ===
| Monument | 2005 | 2006 | 2007 | 2008 | 2009 | 2010 | 2011 | 2012 | 2013 | 2014 |
|---|---|---|---|---|---|---|---|---|---|---|
| Milan–San Remo | — | — | — | — | 128 | DNF | — | — | — | — |
| Tour of Flanders | Did not contest during his career | | | | | | | | | |
| Paris–Roubaix | Did not contest during his career | | | | | | | | | |
| Liège–Bastogne–Liège | — | — | 46 | 4 | 1 | 5 | 3 | 50 | 41 | DNF |
| Giro di Lombardia | 63 | — | 4 | — | — | DNF | — | — | DNF | — |

Legend
| — | Did not compete |
| DNF | Did not finish |
