= Pro Ötztaler 5500 =

Race details
- Date: August
- Region: Austria
- Discipline: Road
- Competition: UCI Europe Tour
- Type: One-day race
- Web site: www.oetztaler-radmarathon.com/pro-oetztaler-5500

History
- First edition: 2017
- Editions: 1
- Final edition: 2017
- First winner: Roman Kreuziger (CZE)
- Final winner: Roman Kreuziger (CZE)

The Pro Ötztaler 5500 was a one-day road cycling race held in Austria. It was rated as a category 1.1 event on the 2017 UCI Europe Tour.

The route followed the same course as the Ötztaler Radmarathon, an event held since 1982, open to amateurs and pros alike. During the Pro Ötztaler 5500, Roman Kreuziger set a new course record, with a time of 6:37:34.

At the end of 2017, the organizers announced that the race would no longer be held due to a lack of television coverage and a conflict with other events on the UCI calendar.

== Winners ==
Year	Country	Rider	Team
2017	Czech Republic	Roman Kreuziger	Orica–Scott
