= Roman Kreuziger Sr. =

Czech former bicycle racer (born 1965)

Roman Kreuziger (born 11 June 1965 in Uničov) is a Czech former bicycle racer. During his career, Kreuziger won the Tour of Austria in 1991 and the Cyclocross Junior World Championships in 1983. He is the father of racer Roman Kreuziger.
