= Roman Kreuziger =

Czech road bicycle racer (born 1986)

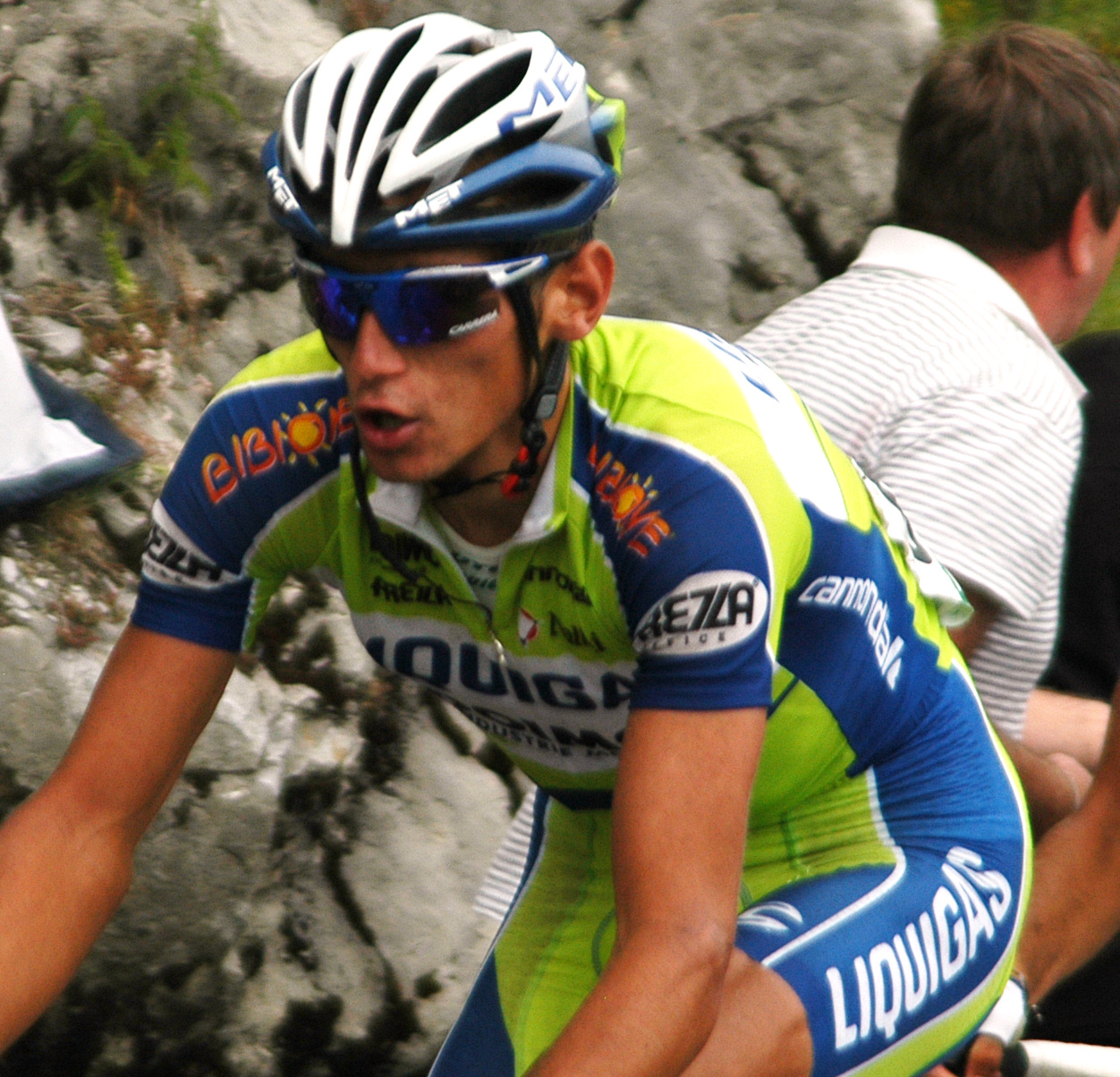
- Kreuziger at the 2009 Tour de France.

Personal information
- Full name: Roman Kreuziger
- Born: 6 May 1986 (age 40) Moravská Třebová, Czechoslovakia (now Czech Republic)
- Height: 1.83 m (6 ft 0 in)
- Weight: 65 kg (143 lb; 10.2 st)

Cycling career
- Sport: Cycling
- Current team: Team Bahrain Victorious
- Discipline: Road
- Role: Rider (retired); Directeur sportif
- Rider type: All-rounder; Puncheur

Professional teams
- 2006–2010: Liquigas
- 2011–2012: Astana
- 2013–2016: Saxo–Tinkoff
- 2017–2018: Orica–Scott
- 2019–2020: Team Dimension Data
- 2021: Gazprom–RusVelo

Managerial team
- 2022–: Team Bahrain Victorious

Major wins
- Grand Tours Giro d'Italia Young rider classification (2011) 1 individual stage (2012) Stage races Tour de Suisse (2008) Tour de Romandie (2009) One-day races and Classics National Road Race Championships (2016) Amstel Gold Race (2013) Clásica de San Sebastián (2009)

Roman Kreuziger (Czech pronunciation: [ˈroman ˈkrojtsɪɡr̩]; born 6 May 1986) is a Czech former professional road bicycle racer, who rode professionally between 2006 and 2021 for six different teams. His father, Roman Kreuziger Sr., was also a bicycle racer who won the Tour of Austria in 1991 and the Cyclocross Junior World Championships in 1983.

Kreuziger competed as an all-rounder, with climbing and time trial abilities, becoming a contender for the General classification of stage races. He was also considered one of the biggest talents of the sport after winning the junior road race at the 2004 UCI Road World Championships and the 2008 Tour de Suisse at the age of 22. The next year, he won the 2009 Tour de Romandie and in 2013, he was the victor of the Amstel Gold Race.

Since his retirement, Kreuziger now works as a directeur sportif for UCI WorldTeam Team Bahrain Victorious.

== Career ==
=== Liquigas (2006–2010) ===
He turned professional in 2006 with Liquigas after a successful amateur career which saw him win the Junior Road World Championships in 2004 and a stage of the Giro delle Regioni in 2005. In 2007, he showed great improvements in his abilities by placing second in the prologues of Paris–Nice and the Tour de Romandie, where he also finished sixth overall. He took his first professional victory in the second stage of the Settimana Ciclistica Lombarda. In late 2007, he also completed his first Grand Tour after finishing 21st in the Vuelta a España.

In 2008, he finished second in the Tour de Romandie, 35 seconds behind Andreas Klöden, one of the world's leading riders. He avenged his loss by winning the Tour de Suisse by finishing 49 seconds ahead of Klöden and winning the mountain time trial to Klausen Pass. In his first Tour de France, he proved himself as an excellent climber among the world's greats, eventually finishing second in the youth competition, and 12th overall. After the Tour, Kreuziger was known to be one of the future riders to potentially win grand tours.

In 2009, he got back to the Tour de Romandie and finally succeeded in his attempt to win the race, getting also one stage victory. He added to this success by finishing in ninth place in the Tour de France.

In 2010, he won the Giro di Sardegna, finished third in Paris–Nice. Kreuziger's 9th overall in the Tour de France was a disappointment because it was not much of an improvement from his 9th-place finish in the 2009 Tour (though he would move into 8th after the Alberto Contador's stripped title). He then made the move from Liquigas–Doimo to Astana after five seasons with the Italian team.

=== Astana (2011–2012) ===
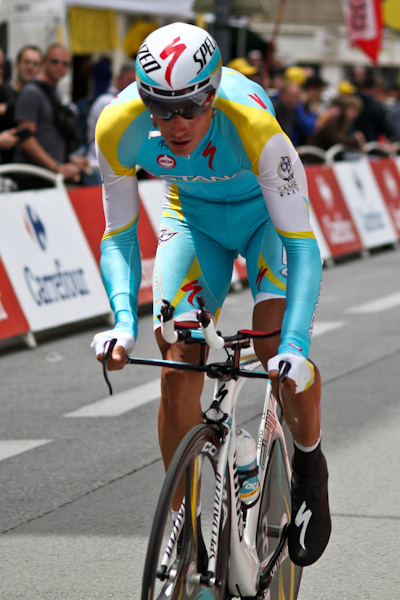
Kreuziger at the 2011 Tour de France

In 2011, Kreuziger won the mountains classification and a stage in the Giro del Trentino. He achieved a 4th-place finish in the Liège–Bastogne–Liège by winning the sprint of the chasing group, almost half-a-minute behind winner Philippe Gilbert. He then aimed for the Giro d'Italia. Kreuziger did not quite have the uphill strength that Contador, Nibali, and Scarponi had, causing him to miss out on the podium. He ended up finishing 5th overall and he also won the young rider's classification.

In 2012, he finished third in the Tirreno–Adriatico. He entered the 2012 Giro d'Italia leading Team Astana with Paolo Tiralongo. He won the mountainous stage 19 after a solo breakaway but had a disappointing 15th overall finish.

=== Team Saxo–Tinkoff (2013–2016) ===
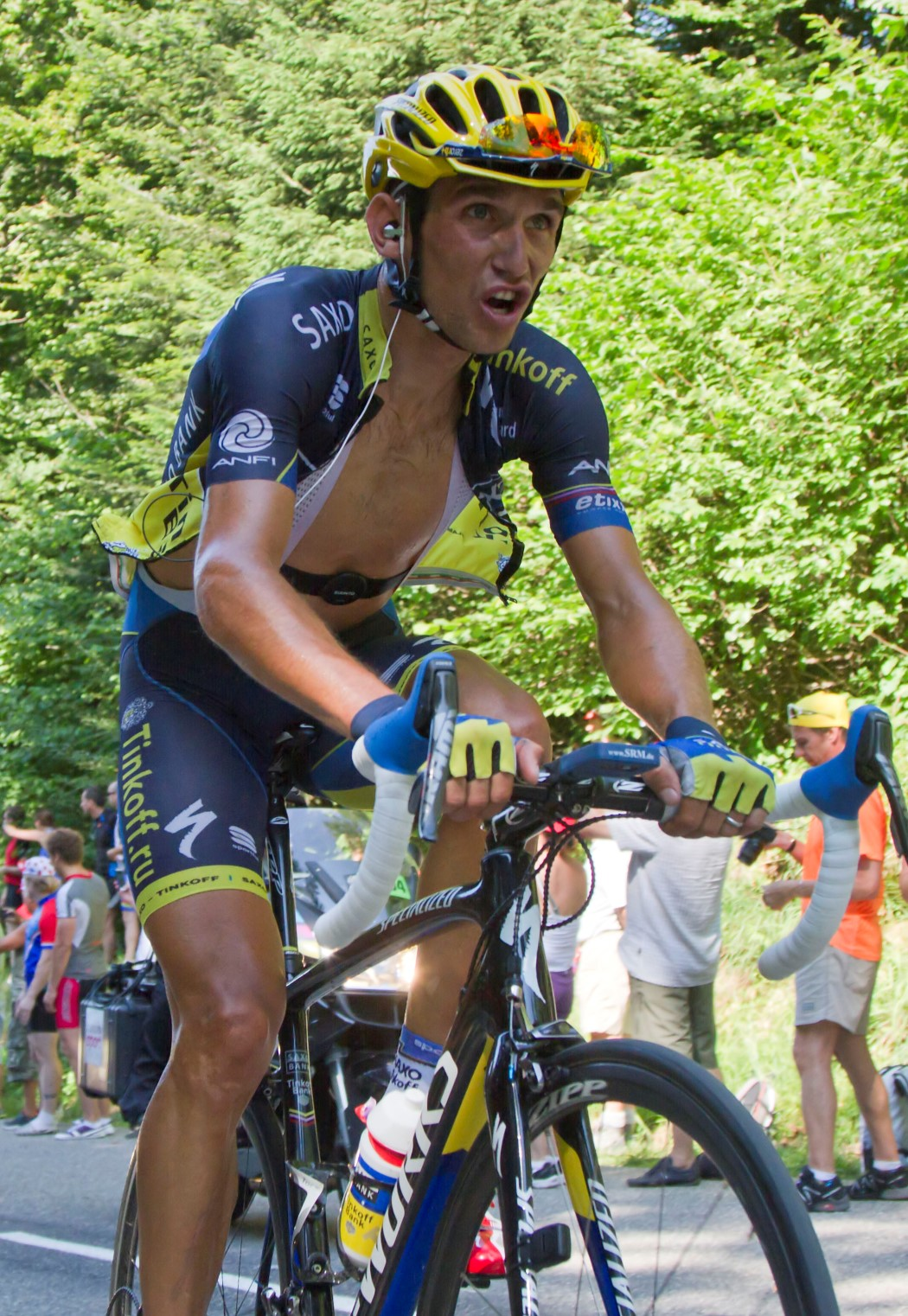
Kreuziger at the 2013 Tour de France

Kreuziger left Astana at the end of the 2012 season, and joined Saxo–Tinkoff on a three-year contract from the 2013 season onwards. In April 2013, he won the Amstel Gold Race. He broke free of the lead group with 7 km (4.3 mi) to go and resisted the peloton's surge on the Cauberg, taking a solo triumph. Kreuziger worked with doping doctor Michele Ferrari according to former teammate Leonardo Bertagnolli. When asked about the allegations after the Amstel Gold Race, Kreuziger refused to comment on the ties, saying he would address the topic after the Tour de Romandie. He did and he admitted working with Ferrari from the autumn of 2006 through 2007 but that he did not use banned drugs. After the Amstel Gold Race, Kreuziger finished 3rd in the Tour de Suisse after aiming to win it.

Despite riding the 2013 Tour to support Alberto Contador, Kreuziger left the Pyrenees 5th overall. After putting a solid time trial on stage 17, Kreuziger moved into the top three, moving ahead of Laurens ten Dam and Bauke Mollema. Despite moving into a high finish with Alberto Contador, Kreuziger slipped down to 5th overall after losing ground to Nairo Quintana and Joaquim Rodríguez in the alps.

In 2014, Kreuziger started his season finishing 8th in the Tour of Oman. He rode the Tirreno Adriatico in support of Alberto Contador though he finished 3rd overall with Contador winning the race. After, he rode through the Ardennes classics finishing in the top ten in the Fleche Wallonne and the Liege-Bastogne-Liege. He then finished 8th the Tour de Suisse.

In June 2014, Tinkoff-Saxo announced that Kreuziger was being temporarily suspended from racing after the UCI questioned abnormalities in his biological passport. The UCI had originally highlighted the problems in his biological data for the 2011 and 2012 seasons through a letter in June 2013, which Kreuziger had responded to in October 2013, even though the values did not get out of the biological passport range which determines what values the gained cyclist samples ought to have. The UCI subsequently followed this up in May 2014. This prevented Kreuziger from riding the Tour de France and Tour de Pologne. In August 2014, the Court of Arbitration for Sport rejected an appeal by Kreuziger to allow him to start the 2014 Vuelta a España. On 22 September, it was announced that the Czech Olympic Committee had cleared him of any anti-doping violation and that he was free to compete again. The UCI and the World Anti-Doping Agency appealed against the decision to the Court of Arbitration for Sport in October 2014. The case was dropped by both agencies on 5 June 2015. Kreuziger took part in the 2015 Tour de France, finishing in 17th place.

=== Orica–Scott (2017–2018) ===
In August 2016, Orica–Scott announced the 'game-changing signing' of Kreuziger on a 2-year contract, ending at the end of the 2018 season. In his first season, Kreuziger took his only victory with the team at the Pro Ötztaler 5500, a one-day race with 5,500 metres (18,000 feet) of climbing. In 2018, he recorded top-ten finishes in the three Ardennes classics races, with a best finish of second place at the Amstel Gold Race, losing a two-up sprint to Michael Valgren. He also finished in sixth place in the road race at the UCI Road World Championships, leading home the first chase group.

=== Team Dimension Data and Gazprom–RusVelo (2019–2021) ===
After two years with Mitchelton–Scott, Kreuziger joined Team Dimension Data to bolster its roster for classic cycle races. In his two seasons with the team, he did not record a single top-ten individual finish.

Kreuziger joined Gazprom–RusVelo on a one-year contract, for the 2021 season. He failed to record any top-twenty individual finishes, and although he was offered a contract extension for 2022, Kreuziger elected to retire and became a directeur sportif with Team Bahrain Victorious.

== Major results ==
=== Cyclo-cross ===
2004
2nd UCI World Junior Championships
2nd UEC European Junior Championships

=== Road ===
2003
6th Time trial, UCI World Junior Championships
2004
UCI World Junior Championships

1st Road race
2nd Time trial

National Junior Championships

1st Road race
1st Time trial

1st Overall Grand Prix Rüebliland
5th Overall Giro della Lunigiana

1st Stage 3b (ITT)

2005
2nd Overall Giro delle Regioni

1st Stage 3

8th Gran Premio Palio del Recioto
10th Overall Giro della Toscana
2006
9th Trofeo Città di Castelfidardo
9th Gran Premio Industria e Commercio Artigianato Carnaghese
2007
1st Trofeo Città di Borgomanero
6th Overall Settimana Ciclistica Lombarda

1st Stages 1 (TTT) & 2

6th Overall Tour de Romandie
2008
1st Overall Tour de Suisse

1st Stage 8 (ITT)

2nd Overall Tour de Romandie
7th Overall Tour of Missouri

1st Young rider classification

10th Overall Tour de Luxembourg
2009
1st Overall Tour de Romandie

1st Young rider classification
1st Stage 4

1st Clásica de San Sebastián
3rd Overall Tour de Suisse
7th UCI World Ranking
8th Overall Tour de France
10th Overall Tour of the Basque Country
2010
1st Overall Giro di Sardegna

1st Stage 2

3rd Overall Paris–Nice

1st Young rider classification

5th Amstel Gold Race
7th Overall Tour de France
8th Overall Volta a Catalunya
2011
Giro del Trentino

1st Mountains classification
1st Stage 4

4th Liège–Bastogne–Liège
5th Overall Giro d'Italia

1st Young rider classification

2012
1st Stage 19 Giro d'Italia
2nd Tour Bohemia
3rd Overall Tirreno–Adriatico
6th Overall Tour de Romandie
6th Overall Tour de Suisse
6th Overall Giro del Trentino
6th Strade Bianche
2013
1st Amstel Gold Race
3rd Overall Tour de Suisse
3rd Clásica de San Sebastián
5th Overall Tour de France
6th GP Miguel Induráin
2014
3rd Overall Tirreno–Adriatico
5th Strade Bianche
7th Liège–Bastogne–Liège
8th Overall Tour of Oman
8th Overall Tour de Suisse
8th La Flèche Wallonne
2015
1st Stage 6 USA Pro Cycling Challenge
5th Liège–Bastogne–Liège
10th Overall Tirreno–Adriatico
2016
1st Road race, National Championships
6th Overall Vuelta a Andalucía
7th Liège–Bastogne–Liège
10th Overall Tour de France
10th Overall Tirreno–Adriatico
2017
1st Pro Ötztaler 5500
4th Road race, National Championships
2018
2nd Amstel Gold Race
4th La Flèche Wallonne
6th Road race, UCI World Championships
8th Overall Volta a la Comunitat Valenciana
8th Liège–Bastogne–Liège

==== General classification results timeline ====
Grand Tour general classification results
Grand Tour	2007	2008	2009	2010	2011	2012	2013	2014	2015	2016	2017	2018	2019	2020	2021
Giro d'Italia	—	—	—	—	5	15	—	—	28	—	—	55	—	—	—
Tour de France	—	12	8	7	112	—	5	—	17	10	24	—	16	109	—
/ Vuelta a España	21	—	61	28	—	—	DNF	—	—	—	—	—	—	—	—
Major stage race general classification results
Race	2007	2008	2009	2010	2011	2012	2013	2014	2015	2016	2017	2018	2019	2020	2021
Paris–Nice	19	DNF	DNF	3	17	—	—	—	—	—	—	19	—	24	—
/ Tirreno–Adriatico	—	—	—	—	—	3	13	3	10	10	DNF	—	27	—	77
Volta a Catalunya	—	—	—	8	—	—	—	—	—	—	—	—	—	NH	78
Tour of the Basque Country	—	—	10	—	—	—	18	17	—	30	33	—	—	NH	—
Tour de Romandie	6	2	1	DNF	63	6	30	—	—	—	35	—	—	NH	—
Critérium du Dauphiné	—	—	—	—	—	—	—	—	—	19	28	—	—	DNF	—
Tour de Suisse	—	1	3	16	—	6	3	8	—	—	—	DNF	22	NH	—

==== Classics results timeline ====
Monument	2007	2008	2009	2010	2011	2012	2013	2014	2015	2016	2017	2018	2019	2020	2021
Milan–San Remo	—	—	—	86	—	—	—	DNF	29	56	—	—	40	54	—
Tour of Flanders	Did not contest during his career														
Paris–Roubaix	Did not contest during his career														
Liège–Bastogne–Liège	—	—	45	48	4	—	125	7	5	7	27	8	79	DNF	DNF
Giro di Lombardia	—	—	—	—	—	—	—	23	—	DNF	32	43	DNF	—	—
Classic	2007	2008	2009	2010	2011	2012	2013	2014	2015	2016	2017	2018	2019	2020	2021
Strade Bianche	DNF	—	—	—	—	6	—	5	11	—	DNF	—	20	OTL	—
Amstel Gold Race	59	52	18	5	—	—	1	18	14	12	126	2	18	NH	81
La Flèche Wallonne	39	50	51	91	—	—	17	8	11	11	72	4	DNF	DNF	47
Clásica de San Sebastián	—	20	1	DNF	—	—	3	—	13	22	63	—	17	NH	—

Legend
—	Did not compete
OTL	Outside time limit
DNF	Did not finish
NH	Not held
