= 2009 Clásica de San Sebastián =

2009 UCI World Ranking, race 18 of 24

Race details
- Dates: August 1, 2009
- Stages: 1
- Distance: 237 km (147 mi)
- Winning time: 5h 37' 00"

Results
	Winner	~~Carlos Barredo~~ Roman Kreuziger (CZE)	(Liquigas–Doimo)
	Second	Mickaël Delage (FRA)	(Silence–Lotto)
	Third	Peter Velits (SVK)	(Team Milram)

The 2009 Clásica de San Sebastián was the 29th edition of the Clásica de San Sebastián road cycling race. It took place on 1 August 2009, and was the tenth event of the 2009 UCI ProTour, and the eighteenth in the inaugural UCI World Ranking series. It began and ended in San Sebastián, in the Basque Country, Spain. The race covered 237 kilometres (147 mi), mainly to the south and east of the city, and entirely within the province of Guipúzcoa.

== Teams and riders ==
As the race was under the auspices of the UCI ProTour, all eighteen ProTour teams were invited automatically. An additional wildcard invitation was given to Contentpolis-Ampo, a Professional Continental team, to form the event's 19-team peloton.

The 19 teams invited to the race are:

- Ag2r–La Mondiale
- Astana
- Bbox Bouygues Telecom
- Contentpolis–Ampo
- Caisse d'Epargne
- Cofidis
- Euskaltel–Euskadi
- Française des Jeux
- Fuji–Servetto
- Garmin–Slipstream
- Lampre–NGC
- Liquigas–Doimo
- Quick-Step
- Rabobank
- Silence–Lotto
- Team Columbia–HTC
- Team Katusha
- Team Milram
- Team Saxo Bank

Teams consisted of up to eight riders, and 143 riders started the event. The event takes place less than a week after the conclusion of the 2009 Tour de France, and many of the riders who took part in that event, were scheduled for this race, including all but three of the top fifteen finishers, although a number of the higher profile riders withdrew in the last few days before the event, including the suspended local rider, Mikel Astarloza.

== Route ==
The route is an anticlockwise loop, heading southwest from San Sebastián, reaching its highest point, and its farthest from the city at the Alto de Udana (574 m). It then heads back towards the southern suburbs of the start town, before heading east through the Jaizkibel mountains to Hondarribia on the French border, and then back to San Sebastián.

== Categories ==
As well as the overall race, there are prizes available for amassing most points at five intermediate sprints around the course, and for gaining points at the top of six mountain passes and hilltops.

== General Standings ==
Rank	Cyclist	Team	Time	UCI World Ranking Points
DSQ	~~Carlos Barredo (ESP)~~	~~Quick-Step~~	~~5h 37' 00"~~	~~80~~
1	Roman Kreuziger (CZE)	Liquigas–Doimo	5h 37' 00"	60
2	Mickaël Delage (FRA)	Silence–Lotto	+ 7"	50
3	Peter Velits (SVK)	Team Milram	s.t.	40
4	Ryder Hesjedal (CAN)	Garmin–Slipstream	s.t.	30
5	Filippo Pozzato (ITA)	Team Katusha	s.t.	22
6	Christophe Riblon (FRA)	Ag2r–La Mondiale	s.t.	14
7	Serguei Ivanov (RUS)	Team Katusha	s.t.	10
8	Rubén Pérez (ESP)	Euskaltel–Euskadi	s.t.	6
9	Marco Pinotti (ITA)	Team Columbia–HTC	s.t.	2
10	Johan Vansummeren (BEL)	Silence–Lotto	s.t.	-
