= 2009 Gent–Wevelgem =

2009 UCI World Ranking, race 7 of 24

Race details
- Dates: 8 April 2009
- Stages: 1

Results
	Winner	Edvald Boasson Hagen (Norway)	(Team Columbia–High Road)
	Second	Aleksandr Kuschynski (Belarus)	(Liquigas)
	Third	Matthew Goss (Australia)	(Team Saxo Bank)

The 71st Gent–Wevelgem cycling race took place on 8 April 2009 between Deinze and Wevelgem in Belgium. It was won by Edvald Boasson Hagen of the Columbia–High Road Team in a sprint finish. The race was the seventh event in the inaugural UCI World Ranking series.

== Results ==
	Cyclist	Team	Time	UCI World Ranking Points
1	Edvald Boasson Hagen (NOR)	Team Columbia–High Road		80
2	Aleksandr Kuschynski (BLR)	Liquigas	+ 3"	60
3	Matthew Goss (AUS)	Team Saxo Bank	+ 52"	50
4	Mathew Hayman (AUS)	Rabobank	s.t.	40
5	Andreas Klier (GER)	Cervélo TestTeam	+ 55"	30
6	Koldo Fernández (ESP)	Euskaltel–Euskadi	+ 1' 47"	22
7	Marcus Burghardt (GER)	Team Columbia–High Road	+ 2' 12"	14
8	Tom Leezer (NED)	Rabobank	s.t.	10
9	Manuel Quinziato (ITA)	Liquigas	s.t.	6
10	Jeremy Hunt (GBR)	Cervélo TestTeam	s.t.	2

== See also ==
- 2009 in Road Cycling
