= 2009 Amstel Gold Race =

Dutch cycling race

2009 UCI World Ranking, race 9 of 24

Race details
- Dates: April 19
- Stages: 1
- Distance: 257.4 km (159.9 mi)

Results
	Winner	Serguei Ivanov (RUS)	(Team Katusha)
	Second	Karsten Kroon (NED)	(Team Saxo Bank)
	Third	Robert Gesink (NED)	(Rabobank)

The 2009 Amstel Gold Race was the 44th edition of the Amstel Gold Race classic cycle race and took place on April 19, 2009. It was held on a 257.4-kilometre (159.9 mi) course from Maastricht to Cauberg, the Netherlands, as the fifth event of the 2009 UCI ProTour, and the ninth event in the inaugural UCI World Ranking series. It was won by Serguei Ivanov, who formed a late breakaway with Robert Gesink and Karsten Kroon with 8 km to go.

The top three from 2008 event, Damiano Cunego, Fränk Schleck, and Alejandro Valverde, were present but only Cunego finished in the top ten.

Over the course of the race, many riders sought to break away from the peloton. While some breakaways lasted for some time, all were eventually retrieved. The final attempt, by Roman Kreuziger, ultimately contributed to the winning move:

Andy Schleck led the peloton at a steady pace over the Kruisberg while Gasparotto did the same over the famous Eyserbosweg. In the descent Kreuziger sneaked away on his own and he rode up the following climb of the Fromberg on the big ring. Still, he gained no more than 100 metres over a peloton that was reduced to no more than 50 riders.

Serguei Ivanov (Katusha), marked by Vincenzo Nibali (Liquigas), tried to bridge up towards Kreuziger but the attempt from the Russian fell short since the Italian didn't co-operate in this counter-attack.

On the Keutenberg, the penultimate climb, Simon Gerrans (Cervélo TestTeam) caught Kreuziger, followed by Ivanov, Robert Gesink (Rabobank), Philippe Gilbert (Silence-Lotto), Andy Schleck, Michael Albasini (Columbia-Highroad), Christian Pfannberger (Katusha) and Karsten Kroon (Saxo Bank).

Meanwhile, the likes of Samuel Sánchez (Euskaltel-Euskadi), Alejandro Valverde (Caisse d'Epargne), Damiano Cunego (Lampre-NGC) and Davide Rebellin (Serramenti PVC Diquigiovanni-Androni Giocattoli) missed this move and were consequently effectively shut out of contesting the finale.

Gesink attacked the leader's group after the climb of the Keutenberg. The Dutchman was joined by Ivanov and Kroon a little later, and while Albasini tried to bridge towards the leaders on his own, it didn't stick. The leading trio was left on its own out front and soon after were the occupants of the podium's three steps.

== Result ==
	Rider	Team	Time
1	Serguei Ivanov (RUS)	Team Katusha	6h 38' 31"
2	Karsten Kroon (NED)	Team Saxo Bank	s.t.
3	Robert Gesink (NED)	Rabobank	+ 8"
4	Philippe Gilbert (BEL)	Silence–Lotto	s.t.
5	Damiano Cunego (ITA)	Lampre–NGC	s.t.
6	Alexandr Kolobnev (RUS)	Team Saxo Bank	s.t.
7	Simon Gerrans (AUS)	Cervélo TestTeam	s.t.
8	Nick Nuyens (BEL)	Rabobank	s.t.
9	~~Christian Pfannberger (AUT)~~	~~Team Katusha~~	s.t.
10	Andy Schleck (LUX)	Team Saxo Bank	s.t.
