= Mickaël Delage =

Road bicycle racer (born 1985)

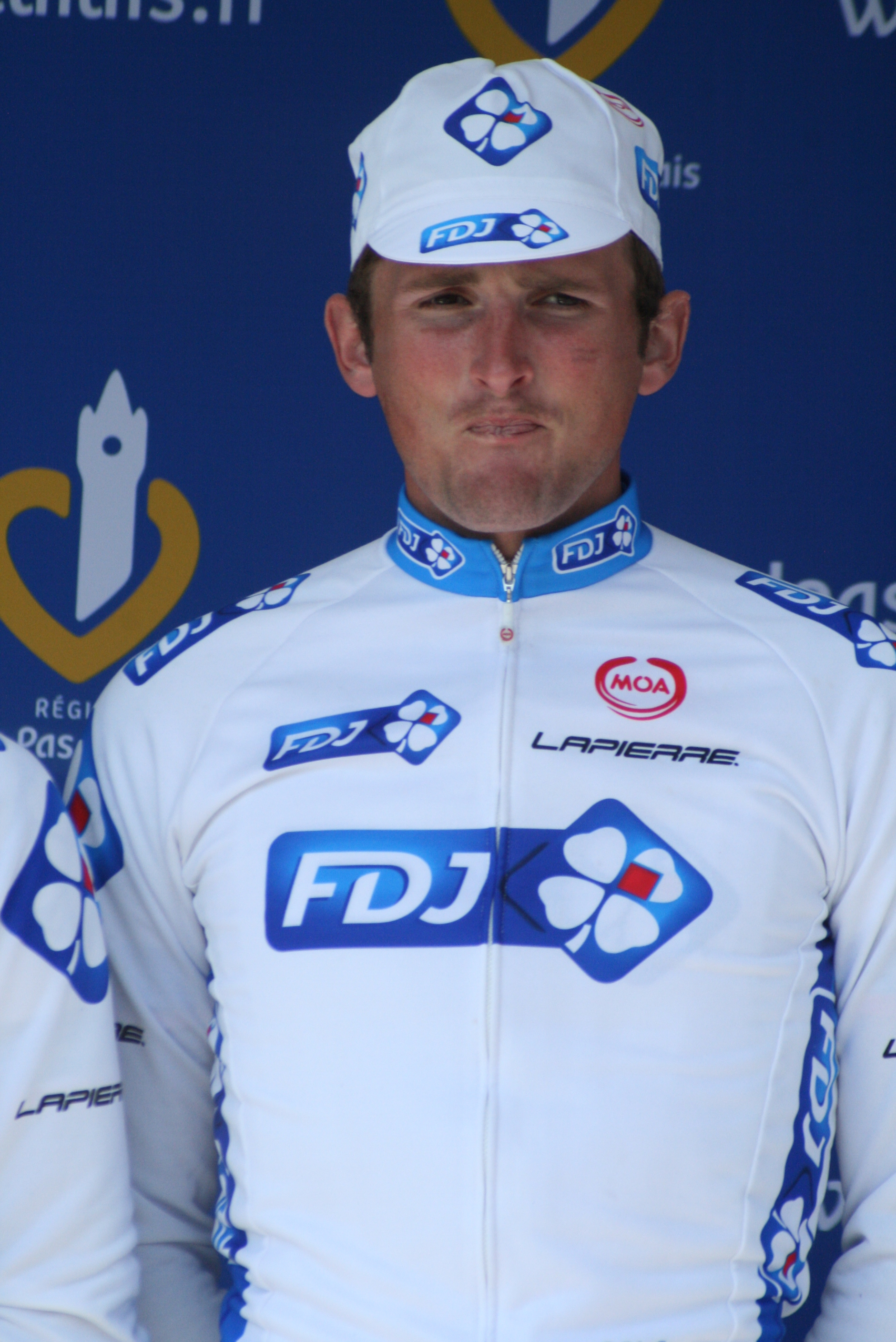
- Delage at the 2011 Four Days of Dunkirk

Personal information
- Full name: Mickaël Delage
- Born: 6 August 1985 (age 41) Libourne, France
- Height: 1.80 m (5 ft 11 in)
- Weight: 70 kg (154 lb)

Cycling career
- Sport: Cycling
- Current team: Retired
- Disciplines: Road; Track
- Role: Rider
- Rider type: Rouleur

Professional teams
- 2005–2008: Française des Jeux
- 2009–2010: Silence–Lotto
- 2011–2021: FDJ

Mickaël Delage (born 6 August 1985) is a French former professional road and track cyclist, who last rode for UCI WorldTeam Groupama–FDJ.

== Career ==
Born in Libourne, Delage participated at the World Track Championships in Moscow in 2003 as a junior, where he won the silver medal at the points race, after Australian Miles Olman. In that same year he would become national junior champion of France at the team pursuit (alongside Jonathan Mouchel, Yannick Marie and Mickaël Mallie) and the madison (together with Mouchel). In 2004 he would win the national title in the points race at the under-23 level.

Delage spent 17 years as a professional rider on the road, riding for 15 of those years with the Française des Jeux team across two spells. He made his Giro d'Italia debut in 2006 and finished in 129th position and he won the 1st stage of the Tour de l'Avenir. Later that year he would again become French national champion when he won the team pursuit together with Mathieu Ladagnous, Jonathan Mouchel, Sylvain Blanquefort and Mickaël Preau. In 2007 he made his Tour de France debut.

Delage's two periods with FDJ were separated by an interlude with Silence–Lotto, joining the Belgian squad alongside FDJ team-mate Philippe Gilbert. Whilst at Lotto he achieved what he later described as the best performance of his career, finishing as runner-up in the 2009 Clásica de San Sebastián. He returned to FDJ in 2011, where he found a role as a leadout man for Arnaud Démare.

Delage suffered injuries at the 2020 Tour de Pologne when he crashed whilst riding downhill at 80 km/h, including a meniscus injury and friction burns. Following this he decided to retire from competition when his contract expired at the end of the following season. Although his 2021 season was disrupted by undergoing knee surgery in March, he returned to competition at the French National Road Race Championships, and finished his career at Paris–Chauny in the autumn.

== Major results ==
2003
National Junior Track Championships

1st Team pursuit
1st Madison

2nd Points race, UCI Junior Track World Championships
2004
1st Points race, National Under-23 Track Championships
2005
9th Overall Circuit Franco-Belge
2006
1st Team pursuit, National Track Championships
1st Stage 1 Tour de l'Avenir
2007
10th Tour de Vendée
2008
4th Overall Tour Down Under
2009
2nd Clásica de San Sebastián
2010
3rd Road race, National Road Championships
2011
5th Overall Tour de Luxembourg
6th Paris–Tours
7th Overall Tour de Picardie
9th Overall Four Days of Dunkirk
9th Grand Prix d'Isbergues
Tour de France

Combativity award, Stages 3 & 11

2012
3rd Cholet-Pays de Loire
3rd Grand Prix de la Somme
6th Polynormande
2013
1st La Roue Tourangelle
7th Paris–Bourges
2014
6th Paris–Bourges
9th Grand Prix d'Isbergues
10th Grand Prix de la Somme
2016
1st Stage 1 (TTT) La Méditerranéenne
4th La Roue Tourangelle
2018
8th Paris–Bourges
2019
7th Tro-Bro Léon

=== Grand Tour general classification results timeline ===
Grand Tour	2006	2007	2008	2009	2010	2011	2012	2013	2014	2015	2016	2017	2018	2019	2020
Giro d'Italia	129	—	—	—	—	—	144	—	—	—	148	—	—	—	—
Tour de France	—	117	—	101	DNF	132	—	—	143	—	—	DNF	—	—	—
/ Vuelta a España	—	DNF	103	73	DNF	—	—	—	—	109	—	—	112	DNF	142

Legend
—	Did not compete
DNF	Did not finish
