= 2009 Liège–Bastogne–Liège =

2009 UCI World Ranking, race 11 of 24

Race details
- Dates: April 26
- Stages: 1
- Distance: 260 km (160 mi)
- Winning time: 6h 34' 32"

Results
	Winner	Andy Schleck (LUX)	(Team Saxo Bank)
	Second	Joaquim Rodriguez (ESP)	(Caisse d'Epargne)
	Third	Davide Rebellin (ITA)	(Diquigiovanni–Androni)

The 2009 Liège–Bastogne–Liège monument classic cycling race took place on April 26, 2009. It was the 95th running of Liège–Bastogne–Liège. Luxembourg's Andy Schleck produced a solo breakaway to beat a strong field and win the race.

== Results ==
	Cyclist	Team	Time
1	Andy Schleck (LUX)	Team Saxo Bank	6h 34' 32"
2	Joaquim Rodríguez (ESP)	Caisse d'Epargne	+ 1' 16"
3	Davide Rebellin (ITA)	Diquigiovanni–Androni	+ 1' 24"
4	Philippe Gilbert (BEL)	Silence–Lotto	+ 1' 24"
5	Sergei Ivanov (RUS)	Team Katusha	+ 1' 24"
6	Simon Gerrans (AUS)	Cervélo TestTeam	+ 1' 24"
7	Damiano Cunego (ITA)	Lampre–NGC	+ 1' 24"
8	Benoît Vaugrenard (FRA)	Française des Jeux	+ 1' 24"
9	Alexandr Kolobnev (RUS)	Team Saxo Bank	+ 1' 24"
10	Samuel Sánchez (ESP)	Euskaltel–Euskadi	+ 1' 24"
