= 2009 Tour de France =

2009 UCI World Ranking, race 17 of 24
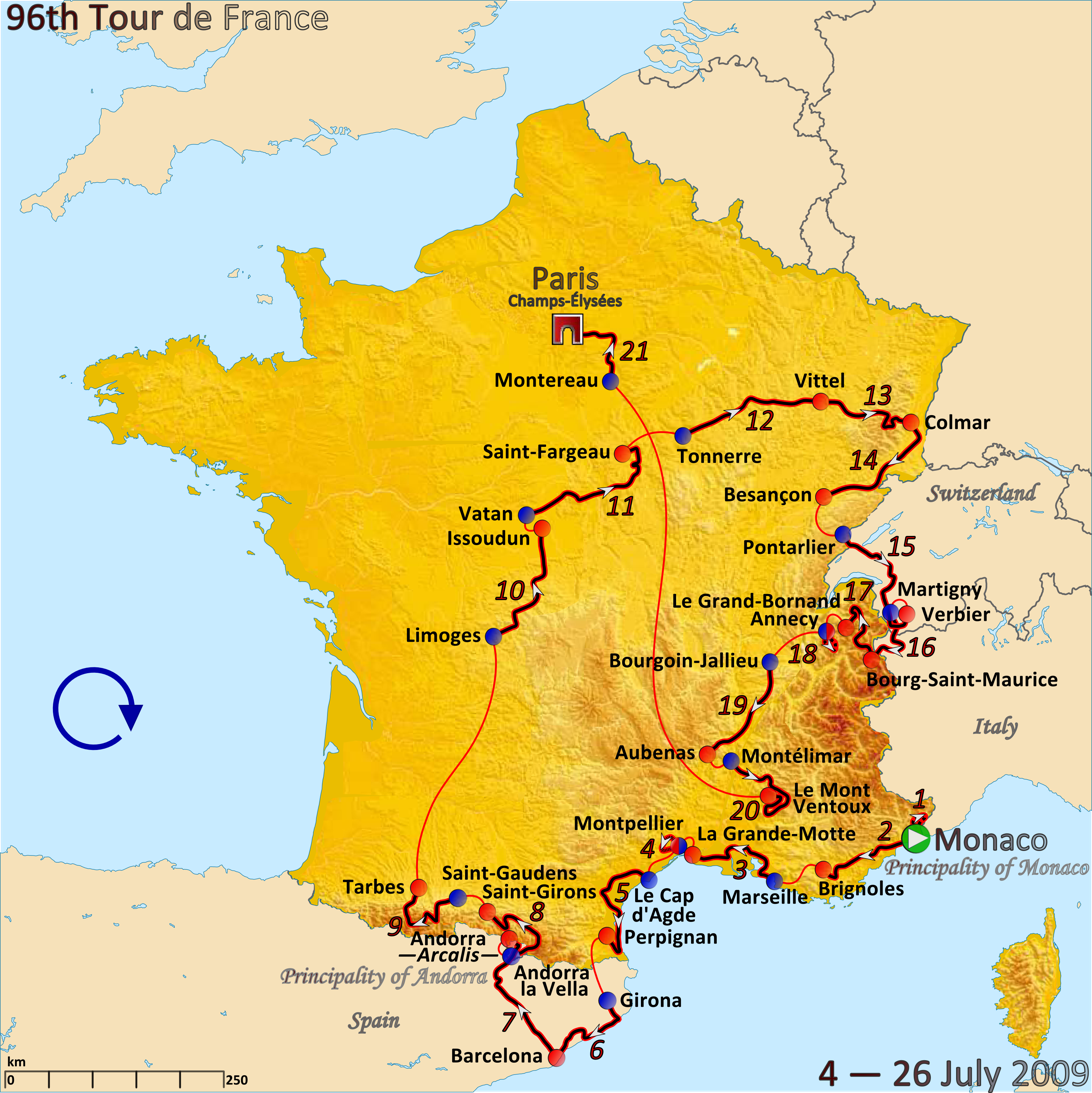
- Route of the 2009 Tour de France

Race details
- Dates: 4–26 July 2009
- Stages: 21
- Distance: 3,459.5 km (2,149.6 mi)
- Winning time: 85h 48' 35"

Results
Jersey awarded to the overall winner	Winner	Alberto Contador (ESP)	(Astana)
	Second	Andy Schleck (LUX)	(Team Saxo Bank)
	Third	~~Lance Armstrong~~ Bradley Wiggins (GBR)	(Garmin–Slipstream)
Jersey awarded to the points classification winner	Points	Thor Hushovd (NOR)	(Cervélo TestTeam)
Jersey awarded to the mountains classification winner	Mountains	~~Franco Pellizotti~~ (Note: In 2011, all of Pellizotti's results since 7 May 2009 were disqualified after the Court of Arbitration for Sport found his biological passport indicated irregular values.) Egoi Martínez (ESP)	(Euskaltel–Euskadi)
Jersey awarded to the young rider classification winner	Young rider	Andy Schleck (LUX)	(Team Saxo Bank)
Jersey awarded to the combativity classification winner	Combativity	~~Franco Pellizotti~~ none	
	Team	Astana	

The 2009 Tour de France was the 96th edition of the Tour de France, one of cycling's Grand Tours. It started on 4 July in the principality of Monaco with a 15 kilometres (9.3 mi) individual time trial which included a section of the Circuit de Monaco. The race visited six countries: Monaco, France, Spain, Andorra, Switzerland and Italy, and finished on 26 July on the Champs-Élysées in Paris.

The total length was 3,445 kilometres (2,141 mi), including 93 kilometres (58 mi) in time-trials. There were seven mountain stages, three of which had mountaintop finishes, and one medium-mountain stage. The race had a team time trial for the first time since 2005, the shortest distance in individual time trials since 1967, and the first penultimate-day mountain stage in the Tour's history.

2007 winner Alberto Contador won the race by a margin of 4′11″, having won both a mountain and time trial stage. His Astana team also took the team classification. and supplied the initial third-place finisher, Lance Armstrong. Armstrong's achievement was later voided by the UCI in October 2012 following his non-dispute of a doping accusation by USADA, and fourth place Bradley Wiggins was promoted to the podium. Andy Schleck, second overall, won the young riders' competition as he had the previous year. Franco Pellizotti originally won the polka dot jersey as the King of the Mountains, but had that result (along with all his 2009 results) stripped by the Court of Arbitration for Sport in 2011 due to his irregular values in the UCI's biological passport program detected in May 2010. and the King of the Mountains title was retroactively awarded to Egoi Martínez. Mark Cavendish won six stages, including the final stage on the Champs-Élysées, but was beaten in the points classification by Thor Hushovd, who consequently won the green jersey.

== Teams ==
20 teams were invited to take part in the race. They include 17 of the 18 UCI ProTour teams (all except for Fuji–Servetto) and three other teams: Skil–Shimano, Cervélo TestTeam and Agritubel. Each team started with 9 riders, making a total of 180 participants, of whom 156 finished.

The teams entering the race were:

UCI ProTour teams

- Ag2r–La Mondiale
- Astana
- Bbox Bouygues Telecom
- Caisse d'Epargne
- Cofidis
- Euskaltel–Euskadi
- Française des Jeux
- Garmin–Slipstream
- Team Katusha
- Lampre–NGC
- Liquigas
- Quick-Step
- Rabobank
- Silence–Lotto
- Team Columbia–HTC
- Team Milram
- Team Saxo Bank

Invited teams

- Agritubel
- Cervélo TestTeam
- Skil–Shimano

== Pre-race favourites ==
Favourites for the race included 2008 winner Carlos Sastre, 2007 winner Alberto Contador, 2009 Giro d'Italia winner Denis Menchov and two-time runner-up Cadel Evans. Lance Armstrong came out of retirement and competed in the race on the same team as Contador. Menchov and Evans performed far below the levels expected of them, finishing 51st and 30th respectively, and Sastre only showed briefly among the leaders on the mountain stages that would have provided his best chance of making a bid for victory, coming 17th overall.

Alejandro Valverde, the team leader of Caisse d'Epargne, was not selected by his team for the Tour de France, because the race travelled through Italy on stage 16 and he had received a ban in May 2009 from the Italian Olympic Committee, prohibiting him from competing in Italy. He had finished in the top ten of the general classification of the Tour in the two previous years and was considered one of the favourites for overall victory.

News about a positive retest of a 2007 out-of-competition control concerning Thomas Dekker broke three days before the start; his team Silence–Lotto immediately withdrew him from the starting list.

== Route and stages ==
The highest point of elevation in the race was 2,470 m (8,100 ft) at the summit of the Col du Grand Saint-Bernard mountain pass on stage 16.

Stage characteristics and winners
Stage	Date	Course	Distance	Type	Winner
1	4 July	Monaco	15.5 km (10 mi)	Individual time trial	Fabian Cancellara (SUI)
2	5 July	Monaco to Brignoles	187 km (116 mi)	Flat stage	Mark Cavendish (GBR)
3	6 July	Marseille to La Grande-Motte	196.5 km (122 mi)	Flat stage	Mark Cavendish (GBR)
4	7 July	Montpellier	39 km (24 mi)	Team time trial	Astana
5	8 July	Cap d'Agde to Perpignan	196.5 km (122 mi)	Flat stage	Thomas Voeckler (FRA)
6	9 July	Girona (Spain) to Barcelona (Spain)	181.5 km (113 mi)	Flat stage	Thor Hushovd (NOR)
7	10 July	Barcelona to Andorra-Arcalis (Andorra)	224 km (139 mi)	Mountain stage	Brice Feillu (FRA)
8	11 July	Andorra la Vella to Saint-Girons	176.5 km (110 mi)	Mountain stage	Luis León Sánchez (ESP)
9	12 July	Saint-Gaudens to Tarbes	160.5 km (100 mi)	Mountain stage	Pierrick Fédrigo (FRA)
	13 July	Limoges		Rest day	
10	14 July	Limoges to Issoudun	194.5 km (121 mi)	Flat stage	Mark Cavendish (GBR)
11	15 July	Vatan to Saint-Fargeau	192 km (119 mi)	Flat stage	Mark Cavendish (GBR)
12	16 July	Tonnerre to Vittel	211.5 km (131 mi)	Flat stage	Nicki Sørensen (DEN)
13	17 July	Vittel to Colmar	200 km (124 mi)	Medium mountain stage	Heinrich Haussler (GER)
14	18 July	Colmar to Besançon	199 km (124 mi)	Flat stage	Sergei Ivanov (RUS)
15	19 July	Pontarlier to Verbier (Switzerland)	207.5 km (129 mi)	Mountain Stage	Alberto Contador (ESP)
	20 July	Verbier (Switzerland)		Rest day	
16	21 July	Martigny (Switzerland) to Bourg-Saint-Maurice	159 km (99 mi)	Mountain Stage	Sandy Casar (FRA)
17	22 July	Bourg-Saint-Maurice to Le Grand-Bornand	169.5 km (105 mi)	Mountain Stage	Fränk Schleck (LUX)
18	23 July	Annecy	40.5 km (25 mi)	Individual time trial	Alberto Contador (ESP)
19	24 July	Bourgoin-Jallieu to Aubenas	178 km (111 mi)	Flat stage	Mark Cavendish (GBR)
20	25 July	Montélimar to Mont Ventoux	167 km (104 mi)	Mountain stage	Juan Manuel Gárate (ESP)
21	26 July	Montereau-Fault-Yonne to Paris (Champs-Élysées)	164 km (102 mi)	Flat stage	Mark Cavendish (GBR)
	Total		3,459.5 km (2,150 mi)		

== Race overview ==
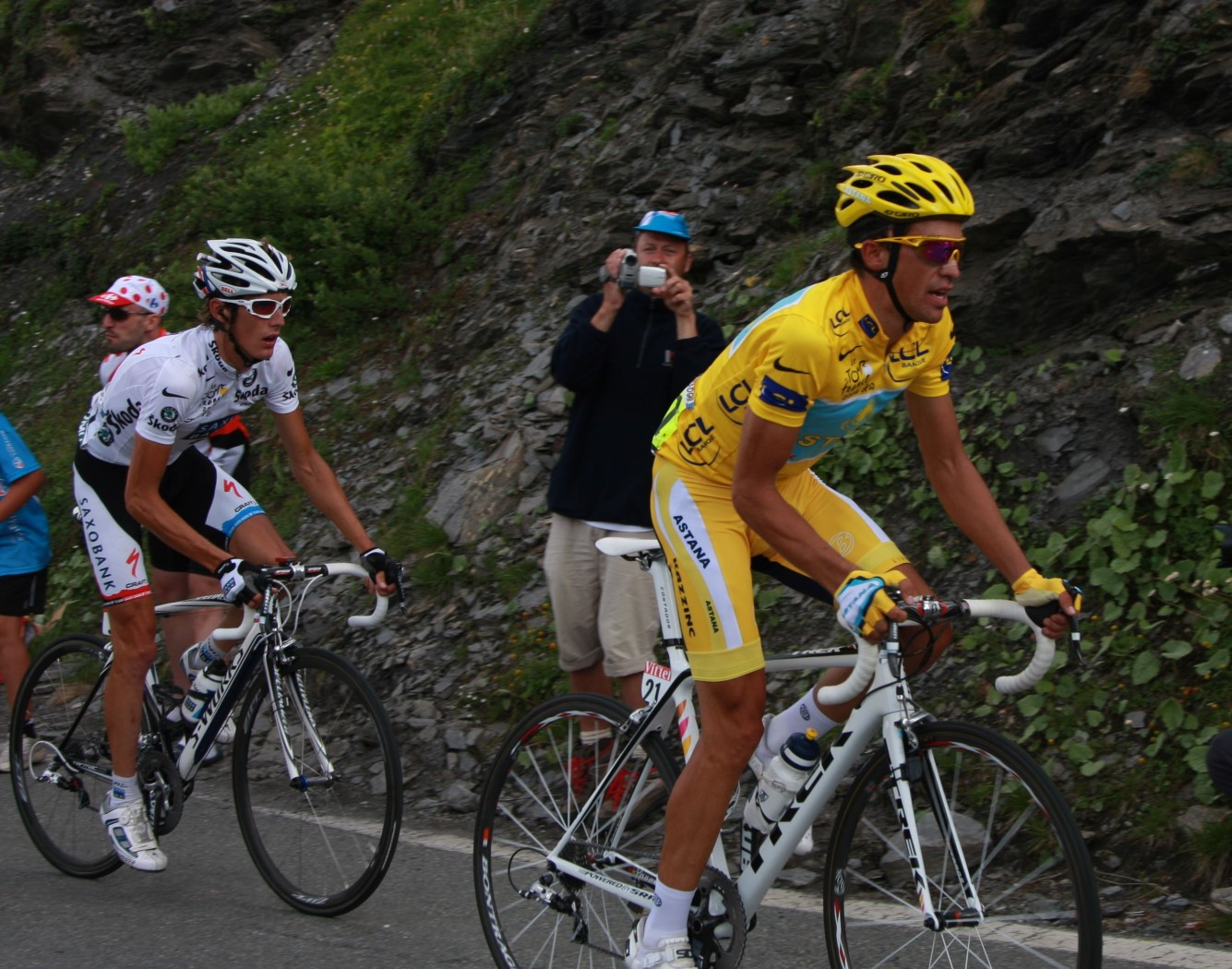
Andy Schleck wearing the white jersey and Alberto Contador wearing the yellow jersey during the Tour

The race started in Monaco with a 15 kilometres (9.3 mi) individual time trial, won by Olympic time trial champion Fabian Cancellara, who retained the yellow jersey as leader of the general classification throughout the first week, which was dominated by stages suited primarily to sprinters, with Mark Cavendish establishing himself as the strongest finisher. The significant action of the first week in relation to the overall classification was restricted to a split in the field on stage 3, and a team time trial the following day.

The second weekend saw the Tour in the Pyrenees, and the first attack on the field by eventual winner Alberto Contador, while the leadership was taken over by Rinaldo Nocentini. Thor Hushovd showed an ability to take points in stages that did not include flat sprint finishes that would be key to the contest for the points classification, and the main contenders for the mountains classification emerged. The journey towards the Alps the following week had a second pair of successive stage wins for Cavendish and a series of wins from riders in breakaways that held no threat to the general classification. An infringement in the sprint finish to stage 14 saw Cavendish relegated in finishing position, and Hushovd gaining the upper hand in the points classification.

The first alpine stage was the occasion of Contador's assumption of the race leadership, and the emergence of Andy Schleck as the only rider likely to challenge him in the mountains, and as the top young rider, giving Schleck the right to wear the white jersey. Franco Pellizotti focussed on collecting points on the climbs early in stages to overhaul Egoi Martínez in the race for the mountains classification, without threatening the race leaders. By the end of the three stages in the Alps, and after Contador's victory in the final time trial, it was only the minor placings that were realistically under question in the last mountain stage, held for the first time on the penultimate day of the tour on Mont Ventoux.

The UCI introduced a ban on radio communication between team management and riders on stage 10, but the riders responded with a conservative style of racing for most of the stage and the intended repetition of the experiment on stage 13 was abandoned.

Mark Cavendish claimed his sixth Champs-Élysées stage win on the final day of the Tour. At the victory ceremony, the national anthem of Denmark was mistakenly played instead of that of Spain. At the victory ceremony for teams, the anthem of Spain was yet played, because Contador was part of the winning team, Astana.

=== Doping ===
In the 2009 Tour, Doping controls were conducted by the UCI, with the French body AFLD shadowing the process. Officials targeted top riders like Lance Armstrong and Alberto Contador with an unprecedented number of tests. While the Armstrong-Contador conflict ruled the headlines, reporting on doping rather took a back seat during the race. The news that Giro runner-up Danilo Di Luca had a positive A probe in the Giro did not change that. Five days after the race finished the UCI announced that the initial Stage 16 winner Mikel Astarloza tested positive for EPO in an out-of-competition test on 26 June, eight days before the race started. Later, Astarloza was removed from the results, and the stage win transferred to Sandy Casar.

Just days before the 2010 Giro d'Italia, 2009 Giro podium finisher and King of the Mountains winner in this Tour Franco Pellizotti was announced by the UCI as a rider of interest in their biological passport program. He was sidelined by his team, and did not race again in 2010. The case was not fully resolved until March 2011, at which time the Court of Arbitration for Sport ordered Pellizotti banned for two years, to pay a fine and court costs, and have all his 2009 results vacated.

In October 2012, Lance Armstrong had all his results post 1998, including the 2009 Tour, voided by the UCI following the USADA investigation into systematic doping.

On 10 July 2014, a UCI press release detailing various athlete sanctions specified that Menchov had been banned (for a period of two years) until 9 April 2015 due to adverse biological passport findings. Due to this, he has been disqualified from the 2009, 2010 and 2012 Tours de France.

== Classification leadership and minor prizes ==
There were four main individual classifications contested in the 2009 Tour de France, as well as a team competition. The most important was the general classification, which was calculated by adding each rider's finishing times on each stage. There were no time bonuses given at the end of stages for this edition of the Tour. If a crash had happened within the final 3 km (1.9 mi) of a stage, not including time trials and summit finishes, the riders involved would have received the same time as the group they were in when the crash occurred. The rider with the lowest cumulative time was the winner of the general classification and was considered the overall winner of the Tour. The rider leading the classification wore a yellow jersey.

The second classification was the points classification. Riders received points for finishing in the highest positions in a stage finish, or in intermediate sprints during the stage. The points available for each stage finish were determined by the stage's type. The leader was identified by a green jersey.

The third classification was the mountains classification. Most stages of the race included one or more categorised climbs, in which points were awarded to the riders that reached the summit first. The climbs were categorised as fourth-, third-, second- or first-category and hors catégorie, with the more difficult climbs rated lower. The leader wore a white jersey with red polka dots.

The final individual classification was the young rider classification. This was calculated the same way as the general classification, but the classification was restricted to riders who were born on or after 1 January 1984. The leader wore a white jersey.

The final classification was a team classification. This was calculated using the finishing times of the best three riders per team on each stage; the leading team was the team with the lowest cumulative time. The number of stage victories and placings per team determined the outcome of a tie. The riders in the team that lead this classification were identified with yellow number bibs on the back of their jerseys.

In addition, there was a combativity award given after each mass start stage to the rider considered, by a jury, to have "made the greatest effort and who has demonstrated the best qualities of sportsmanship". The winner wore a red number bib the following stage. At the conclusion of the Tour, Franco Pellizotti was given the overall super-combativity award.

There were also two special awards each with a prize of €5000, the Souvenir Henri Desgrange, given in honour of Tour founder and first race director Henri Desgrange to the first rider to pass the summit of the Col du Grand-Saint-Bernard on stage 16, and the Souvenir Jacques Goddet, given in honour of the second director Jacques Goddet to the first rider to pass the summit of the Col du Tourmalet on stage 9. Franco Pellizotti won both the Henri Desgrange and the Jacques Goddet.

Classification leadership by stage
Stage	Winner	General classification	Points classification	Mountains classification	Young rider classification	Team classification	Combativity award
1	Fabian Cancellara	Fabian Cancellara	Fabian Cancellara	Alberto Contador	Roman Kreuziger	Astana	no award
2	Mark Cavendish	Fabian Cancellara	Mark Cavendish	Jussi Veikkanen	Roman Kreuziger	Astana	Stef Clement
3	Mark Cavendish	Fabian Cancellara	Mark Cavendish	Jussi Veikkanen	Tony Martin	Astana	Samuel Dumoulin
4	Astana	Fabian Cancellara	Mark Cavendish	Jussi Veikkanen	Tony Martin	Astana	no award
5	Thomas Voeckler	Fabian Cancellara	Mark Cavendish	Jussi Veikkanen	Tony Martin	Astana	Mikhail Ignatiev
6	Thor Hushovd	Fabian Cancellara	Mark Cavendish	Stéphane Augé	Tony Martin	Astana	David Millar
7	Brice Feillu	Rinaldo Nocentini	Mark Cavendish	Brice Feillu	Tony Martin	Astana	Christophe Riblon
8	Luis León Sánchez	Rinaldo Nocentini	Thor Hushovd	Christophe Kern	Tony Martin	Ag2r–La Mondiale	Sandy Casar
9	Pierrick Fédrigo	Rinaldo Nocentini	Thor Hushovd	Egoi Martínez	Tony Martin	Ag2r–La Mondiale	~~Franco Pellizotti~~
10	Mark Cavendish	Rinaldo Nocentini	Thor Hushovd	Egoi Martínez	Tony Martin	Ag2r–La Mondiale	Thierry Hupond
11	Mark Cavendish	Rinaldo Nocentini	Mark Cavendish	Egoi Martínez	Tony Martin	Ag2r–La Mondiale	Johan Van Summeren
12	Nicki Sørensen	Rinaldo Nocentini	Mark Cavendish	Egoi Martínez	Tony Martin	Team Saxo Bank	Nicki Sørensen
13	Heinrich Haussler	Rinaldo Nocentini	Thor Hushovd	~~Franco Pellizotti~~	Tony Martin	Team Saxo Bank	Heinrich Haussler
14	Sergei Ivanov	Rinaldo Nocentini	Thor Hushovd	~~Franco Pellizotti~~	Tony Martin	Ag2r–La Mondiale	Martijn Maaskant
15	Alberto Contador	Alberto Contador	Thor Hushovd	~~Franco Pellizotti~~	Andy Schleck	Astana	Simon Špilak
16	Sandy Casar*	Alberto Contador	Thor Hushovd	~~Franco Pellizotti~~	Andy Schleck	Astana	~~Franco Pellizotti~~
17	Fränk Schleck	Alberto Contador	Thor Hushovd	~~Franco Pellizotti~~	Andy Schleck	Astana	Thor Hushovd
18	Alberto Contador	Alberto Contador	Thor Hushovd	~~Franco Pellizotti~~	Andy Schleck	Astana	no award
19	Mark Cavendish	Alberto Contador	Thor Hushovd	~~Franco Pellizotti~~	Andy Schleck	Astana	Leonardo Duque
20	Juan Manuel Gárate	Alberto Contador	Thor Hushovd	~~Franco Pellizotti~~	Andy Schleck	Astana	Tony Martin
21	Mark Cavendish	Alberto Contador	Thor Hushovd	~~Franco Pellizotti~~	Andy Schleck	Astana	Fumiyuki Beppu
Final		Alberto Contador	Thor Hushovd	Egoi Martínez	Andy Schleck	Astana	~~Franco Pellizotti~~

- After stage 1, Fabian Cancellara was leading both the general and the points classifications. In stage 2, he wore the yellow jersey. Alberto Contador was placed second at the time in the green jersey points classification, but was the leader in the king of the mountains classification, and so forfeited the right to wear the green jersey. As a result, the third placed rider in the opening time trial, Bradley Wiggins wore the green jersey on stage 2.
- Stage 16 was originally won by Mikel Astarloza, who was found after the Tour to have tested positive for EPO before the race had started. The organisers have stripped him of the stage win, and former number two Sandy Casar became the official winner.

== Final standings ==
Legend
A yellow jersey.	Denotes the winner of the general classification	A green jersey.	Denotes the winner of the points classification
A white jersey.	Denotes the winner of the young rider classification	A white jersey with a yellow number bib.	Denotes the winner of the team classification
A white jersey with a red number bib.	Denotes the winner of the super-combativity award		

=== General classification ===
Final general classification (1–10)
Rank	Rider	Team	Time
1	Alberto Contador (ESP)	Astana	85h 48' 35"
2	Andy Schleck (LUX)	Team Saxo Bank	+ 4' 11"
DSQ	~~Lance Armstrong (USA)~~ (Note: On 24 August 2012, the United States Anti-Doping Agency announced that they had disqualified Armstrong from all his results since 1998, including his third-place finish in the 2009 Tour de France. The Union Cycliste Internationale, responsible for the international cycling, confirmed this verdict on 22 October 2012.)	~~Astana~~	~~+5' 24"~~
3	Bradley Wiggins (GBR)	Garmin–Slipstream	+ 6' 01"
4	Fränk Schleck (LUX)	Team Saxo Bank	+ 6' 04"
5	Andreas Klöden (GER)	Astana	+ 6' 42"
6	Vincenzo Nibali (ITA)	Liquigas	+ 7' 35"
7	Christian Vande Velde (USA)	Garmin–Slipstream	+ 12' 04"
8	Roman Kreuziger (CZE)	Liquigas	+ 14' 16"
9	Christophe Le Mével (FRA)	Française des Jeux	+ 14' 25"
10	Sandy Casar (FRA)	Française des Jeux	+ 17' 19"

Final general classification (11–152)
Rank	Rider	Team	Time
11	Vladimir Karpets (RUS)	Team Katusha	+ 18' 34"
12	Rinaldo Nocentini (ITA)	Ag2r–La Mondiale	+ 20' 45"
13	Jurgen Van den Broeck (BEL)	Silence–Lotto	+ 20' 50"
14	Stéphane Goubert (FRA)	Ag2r–La Mondiale	+ 22' 29"
15	Carlos Sastre (ESP)	Cervélo TestTeam	+ 26' 21"
16	Alexander Bocharov (RUS)	Team Katusha	+ 29' 33"
17	George Hincapie (USA)	Team Columbia–HTC	+ 33' 27"
18	Sylvain Chavanel (FRA)	Quick-Step	+ 34' 09"
19	Christian Knees (GER)	Team Milram	+ 34' 48"
20	Pierre Rolland (FRA)	Bbox Bouygues Telecom	+ 37' 44"
21	Nicolas Roche (IRE)	Ag2r–La Mondiale	+ 38' 20"
22	Linus Gerdemann (GER)	Team Milram	+ 38' 35"
23	Brice Feillu (FRA)	Agritubel	+ 41' 14"
24	Luis León Sánchez (ESP)	Caisse d'Epargne	+ 41' 27"
25	Haimar Zubeldia (ESP)	Astana	+ 43' 34"
26	Maxime Monfort (BEL)	Team Columbia–HTC	+ 43' 54"
27	Christophe Moreau (FRA)	Agritubel	+ 44' 33"
28	Cadel Evans (AUS)	Silence–Lotto	+ 45' 24"
29	Nicki Sørensen (DEN)	Team Saxo Bank	+ 46' 34"
30	Peter Velits (SVK)	Team Milram	+ 46' 35"
31	Hubert Dupont (FRA)	Ag2r–La Mondiale	+ 49' 43"
32	Chris Anker Sørensen (DEN)	Team Saxo Bank	+ 49' 47"
33	Sérgio Paulinho (POR)	Astana	+ 54' 00"
34	Tony Martin (GER)	Team Columbia–HTC	+ 55' 04"
DSQ	~~Franco Pellizotti (ITA)~~	~~Liquigas~~	~~+56' 19"~~
35	Sébastien Minard (FRA)	Cofidis	+ 57' 37"
36	Luis Pasamontes (ESP)	Caisse d'Epargne	+ 57' 47"
37	Serguei Ivanov (RUS)	Team Katusha	+ 1h 00' 21"
38	Yaroslav Popovych (UKR)	Astana	+ 1h 01' 08"
39	Laurent Lefèvre (FRA)	Bbox Bouygues Telecom	+ 1h 01' 29"
40	Rémi Pauriol (FRA)	Cofidis	+ 1h 03' 04"
41	Egoi Martínez (ESP)	Euskaltel–Euskadi	+ 1h 07' 20"
42	Volodymir Gustov (UKR)	Cervélo TestTeam	+ 1h 08' 15"
43	Matthew Lloyd (AUS)	Silence–Lotto	+ 1h 09' 05"
44	Yuri Trofimov (RUS)	Bbox Bouygues Telecom	+ 1h 09' 23"
45	Jérémy Roy (FRA)	Française des Jeux	+ 1h 09' 23"
46	Ryder Hesjedal (CAN)	Garmin–Slipstream	+ 1h 14' 03"
47	Gustav Larsson (SWE)	Team Saxo Bank	+ 1h 15' 22"
DSQ	~~Denis Menchov (RUS)~~	~~Rabobank~~	~~+1h 17' 04"~~
49	Rigoberto Urán (COL)	Caisse d'Epargne	+ 1h 20' 20"
50	David Loosli (SUI)	Lampre–NGC	+ 1h 21' 56"
51	Grischa Niermann (GER)	Rabobank	+ 1h 21' 59"
52	Sylvain Calzati (FRA)	Agritubel	+ 1h 25' 47"
53	Pierrick Fédrigo (FRA)	Bbox Bouygues Telecom	+ 1h 26' 07"
54	Kim Kirchen (LUX)	Team Columbia–HTC	+ 1h 26' 52"
55	David Moncoutié (FRA)	Cofidis	+ 1h 28' 35"
56	Charly Wegelius (GBR)	Silence–Lotto	+ 1h 29' 37"
57	Laurens ten Dam (NED)	Rabobank	+ 1h 34' 57"
58	Gorka Verdugo (ESP)	Euskaltel–Euskadi	+ 1h 35' 49"
59	Juan Manuel Gárate (ESP)	Rabobank	+ 1h 37' 19"
60	Carlos Barredo (ESP)	Quick-Step	+ 1h 38' 30"
61	Geoffroy Lequatre (FRA)	Agritubel	+ 1h 40' 09"
62	Amaël Moinard (FRA)	Cofidis	+ 1h 42' 28"
63	Igor Antón (ESP)	Euskaltel–Euskadi	+ 1h 44' 39"
64	Thomas Voeckler (FRA)	Bbox Bouygues Telecom	+ 1h 47' 40"
65	Nicolas Vogondy (FRA)	Agritubel	+ 1h 51' 09"
66	David Arroyo (ESP)	Caisse d'Epargne	+ 1h 51' 52"
67	Maxime Bouet (FRA)	Agritubel	+ 1h 53' 04"
68	Iván Gutiérrez (ESP)	Caisse d'Epargne	+ 1h 54' 08"
69	Rubén Pérez (ESP)	Euskaltel–Euskadi	+ 1h 57' 29"
70	Joost Posthuma (NED)	Rabobank	+ 1h 58' 25"
71	Joan Horrach (ESP)	Team Katusha	+ 1h 58' 52"
72	Christophe Kern (FRA)	Cofidis	+ 1h 59' 20"
73	Sebastian Lang (GER)	Silence–Lotto	+ 2h 00' 52"
74	David Zabriskie (USA)	Garmin–Slipstream	+ 2h 02' 36"
75	Johannes Fröhlinger (GER)	Team Milram	+ 2h 04' 53"
76	Hayden Roulston (NZL)	Cervélo TestTeam	+ 2h 07' 58"
77	Marzio Bruseghin (ITA)	Lampre–NGC	+ 2h 08' 42"
78	José Luis Arrieta (ESP)	Ag2r–La Mondiale	+ 2h 11' 29"
79	Christophe Riblon (FRA)	Ag2r–La Mondiale	+ 2h 12' 43"
80	Stijn Devolder (BEL)	Quick-Step	+ 2h 13' 56"
81	José Joaquín Rojas (ESP)	Caisse d'Epargne	+ 2h 14' 16"
82	David Millar (GBR)	Garmin–Slipstream	+ 2h 15' 04"
83	Frederik Willems (BEL)	Liquigas	+ 2h 16' 11"
84	Íñigo Cuesta (ESP)	Cervélo TestTeam	+ 2h 16' 39"
85	Jérôme Pineau (FRA)	Quick-Step	+ 2h 17' 36"
86	Greg Van Avermaet (BEL)	Silence–Lotto	+ 2h 20' 14"
87	Thierry Hupond (FRA)	Skil–Shimano	+ 2h 22' 58"
88	Fabian Cancellara (SUI)	Team Saxo Bank	+ 2h 23' 55"
89	Aleksandr Kuschynski (BLR)	Liquigas	+ 2h 23' 58"
90	Johan Vansummeren (BEL)	Silence–Lotto	+ 2h 25' 38"
91	Leonardo Duque (COL)	Cofidis	+ 2h 25' 52"
92	Alessandro Ballan (ITA)	Lampre–NGC	+ 2h 26' 22"
93	Stijn Vandenbergh (BEL)	Team Katusha	+ 2h 26' 34"
94	Heinrich Haussler (GER)	Cervélo TestTeam	+ 2h 28' 35"
95	Martijn Maaskant (NED)	Garmin–Slipstream	+ 2h 29' 53"
96	Óscar Freire (ESP)	Rabobank	+ 2h 39' 25"
97	Filippo Pozzato (ITA)	Team Katusha	+ 2h 39' 39"
98	Mickaël Delage (FRA)	Silence–Lotto	+ 2h 42' 20"
99	Juan Antonio Flecha (ESP)	Rabobank	+ 2h 42' 45"
100	Michael Rogers (AUS)	Team Columbia–HTC	+ 2h 42' 57"
101	Sébastien Rosseler (BEL)	Quick-Step	+ 2h 43' 22"
102	Bingen Fernández (ESP)	Cofidis	+ 2h 45' 28"
103	Thor Hushovd (NOR)	Cervélo TestTeam	+ 2h 46' 00"
104	Juan José Oroz (ESP)	Euskaltel–Euskadi	+ 2h 46' 17"
105	Jussi Veikkanen (FIN)	Française des Jeux	+ 2h 47' 21"
106	Simon Špilak (SLO)	Lampre–NGC	+ 2h 52' 24"
107	Daniele Righi (ITA)	Lampre–NGC	+ 2h 52' 44"
108	Koen de Kort (NED)	Skil–Shimano	+ 2h 53' 25"
109	Fumiyuki Beppu (JPN)	Skil–Shimano	+ 2h 55' 21"
110	Simon Geschke (GER)	Skil–Shimano	+ 2h 55' 28"
111	Matteo Tosatto (ITA)	Quick-Step	+ 2h 58' 28"
112	Arnaud Coyot (FRA)	Caisse d'Epargne	+ 2h 59' 10"
113	Brian Vandborg (DEN)	Liquigas	+ 2h 59' 57"
114	Alexandre Pichot (FRA)	Bbox Bouygues Telecom	+ 3h 02' 01"
115	Stef Clement (NED)	Rabobank	+ 3h 02' 11"
116	Anthony Geslin (FRA)	Française des Jeux	+ 3h 02' 26"
117	Alessandro Vanotti (ITA)	Liquigas	+ 3h 04' 00"
118	Julian Dean (NZL)	Garmin–Slipstream	+ 3h 04' 41"
119	Nikolai Troussov (RUS)	Team Katusha	+ 3h 05' 10"
120	Staf Scheirlinckx (BEL)	Silence–Lotto	+ 3h 05' 11"
121	Stuart O'Grady (AUS)	Team Saxo Bank	+ 3h 08' 39"
122	Markus Fothen (GER)	Team Milram	+ 3h 12' 45"
123	Gerald Ciolek (GER)	Team Milram	+ 3h 15' 12"
124	Brett Lancaster (AUS)	Cervélo TestTeam	+ 3h 15' 33"
125	William Bonnet (FRA)	Bbox Bouygues Telecom	+ 3h 16' 29"
126	Yukiya Arashiro (JPN)	Bbox Bouygues Telecom	+ 3h 16' 44"
127	Albert Timmer (NED)	Skil–Shimano	+ 3h 16' 50"
128	Mark Cavendish (GBR)	Team Columbia–HTC	+ 3h 21' 54"
129	Mauro Santambrogio (ITA)	Lampre–NGC	+ 3h 23' 29"
130	Lloyd Mondory (FRA)	Ag2r–La Mondiale	+ 3h 25' 39"
131	Bert Grabsch (GER)	Team Columbia–HTC	+ 3h 27' 06"
132	Daniele Bennati (ITA)	Liquigas	+ 3h 27' 14"
133	Stéphane Augé (FRA)	Cofidis	+ 3h 27' 18"
134	Fabian Wegmann (GER)	Team Milram	+ 3h 29' 54"
135	Grégory Rast (SUI)	Astana	+ 3h 30' 07"
136	Samuel Dumoulin (FRA)	Cofidis	+ 3h 30' 23"
137	Mikhail Ignatiev (RUS)	Team Katusha	+ 3h 32' 09"
138	Danny Pate (USA)	Garmin–Slipstream	+ 3h 32' 39"
139	Benoît Vaugrenard (FRA)	Française des Jeux	+ 3h 34' 35"
140	Saïd Haddou (FRA)	Bbox Bouygues Telecom	+ 3h 34' 55"
141	Cyril Lemoine (FRA)	Skil–Shimano	+ 3h 36' 14"
142	Marco Bandiera (ITA)	Lampre–NGC	+ 3h 39' 14"
143	Marcin Sapa (POL)	Lampre–NGC	+ 3h 41' 46"
144	Fabio Sabatini (ITA)	Liquigas	+ 3h 42' 11"
145	Dmitriy Muravyev (KAZ)	Astana	+ 3h 43' 15"
146	Mark Renshaw (AUS)	Team Columbia–HTC	+ 3h 46' 20"
147	Bernhard Eisel (AUT)	Team Columbia–HTC	+ 3h 47' 43"
148	Tyler Farrar (USA)	Garmin–Slipstream	+ 3h 48' 13"
149	Niki Terpstra (NED)	Team Milram	+ 3h 48' 38"
150	Steven de Jongh (NED)	Quick-Step	+ 3h 49' 21"
151	Jonathan Hivert (FRA)	Skil–Shimano	+ 3h 49' 39"
DSQ	~~Andreas Klier (GER)~~	~~Cervélo TestTeam~~	~~+3h 54' 08"~~
152	Yauheni Hutarovich (BLR)	Française des Jeux	+ 4h 16' 27"

=== Points classification ===
Final points classification (1–10)
Rank	Rider	Team	Points
1	Thor Hushovd (NOR)	Cervélo TestTeam	280
2	Mark Cavendish (GBR)	Team Columbia–HTC	270
3	Gerald Ciolek (GER)	Team Milram	148
4	José Joaquín Rojas (ESP)	Caisse d'Epargne	126
5	Nicolas Roche (IRL)	Ag2r–La Mondiale	122
6	Óscar Freire (ESP)	Rabobank	119
7	Tyler Farrar (USA)	Garmin–Slipstream	110
DSQ	~~Franco Pellizotti (ITA)~~	~~Liquigas~~	~~104~~
9	Alberto Contador (ESP)	Astana	101
10	Andreas Klöden (GER)	Astana	89

=== Mountains classification ===
Final mountains classification (1–10)
Rank	Rider	Team	Points
DSQ	~~Franco Pellizotti (ITA)~~	~~Liquigas~~	~~210~~
1	Egoi Martínez (ESP)	Euskaltel–Euskadi	135
3	Alberto Contador (ESP)	Astana	126
4	Andy Schleck (LUX)	Team Saxo Bank	111
5	Pierrick Fédrigo (FRA)	Bbox Bouygues Telecom	99
6	Christophe Kern (FRA)	Cofidis	89
7	Fränk Schleck (LUX)	Team Saxo Bank	88
DSQ	~~Mikel Astarloza (ESP)~~	~~Euskaltel–Euskadi~~	~~86~~
9	Juan Manuel Gárate (ESP)	Rabobank	86
10	Sandy Casar (FRA)	Française des Jeux	84

=== Young rider classification ===
Final young rider classification (1–10)
Rank	Rider	Team	Time
1	Andy Schleck (LUX)	Team Saxo Bank	85h 52′ 46″
2	Vincenzo Nibali (ITA)	Liquigas	+ 3′ 24″
3	Roman Kreuziger (CZE)	Liquigas	+ 10′ 05″
4	Pierre Rolland (FRA)	Bbox Bouygues Telecom	+ 33′ 33″
5	Nicolas Roche (IRL)	Ag2r–La Mondiale	+ 34′ 09″
6	Brice Feillu (FRA)	Agritubel	+ 37′ 03″
7	Peter Velits (SVK)	Team Milram	+ 42′ 24″
8	Chris Anker Sørensen (DEN)	Team Saxo Bank	+ 45′ 36″
9	Tony Martin (GER)	Team Columbia–HTC	+ 50′ 53″
10	Yury Trofimov (RUS)	Bbox Bouygues Telecom	+ 1h 04′ 50″

=== Team classification ===
Team classification (1–10)
Rank	Team	Time
1	Astana	243h 56′ 04″
2	Garmin–Slipstream	+ 22′ 35″
3	Team Saxo Bank	+ 28′ 34″
4	Ag2r–La Mondiale	+ 31′ 47″
5	Liquigas	+ 43′ 31″
6	Euskaltel–Euskadi	+ 58′ 05″
7	Française des Jeux	+ 1h 01′ 48″
8	Cofidis	+ 1h 05′ 34″
9	Team Katusha	+ 1h 13′ 57″
10	Agritubel	+ 1h 20′ 38″

== World rankings ==
The following points were earned in the Tour towards the 2009 UCI World Ranking.

Rider	Team	Nationality	Stage	Overall	Total
Alberto Contador	Astana	Spain	64	200	264
Andy Schleck	Team Saxo Bank	Luxembourg	22	150	172
Mark Cavendish	Team Columbia–HTC	United Kingdom	126		126
Lance Armstrong	Astana	USA	4	120	124
Fränk Schleck	Team Saxo Bank	Luxembourg	24	100	124
Bradley Wiggins	Garmin–Slipstream	United Kingdom	8	110	118
Andreas Klöden	Astana	Germany	4	90	94
Vincenzo Nibali	Liquigas	Italy	10	80	90
Christian Vande Velde	Garmin–Slipstream	USA		70	70
Mikel Astarloza	Euskaltel–Euskadi	Spain	26	40	66
Roman Kreuziger	Liquigas	Czech Republic		60	60
Thor Hushovd	Cervélo TestTeam	Norway	56		56
Sandy Casar	Française des Jeux	France	20	30	50
Christophe Le Mével	Française des Jeux	France		50	50
Tyler Farrar	Garmin–Slipstream	USA	36		36
Fabian Cancellara	Team Saxo Bank	Switzerland	30		30
Pierrick Fédrigo	Bbox Bouygues Telecom	France	26		26
Brice Feillu	Agritubel	France	26		26
Serguei Ivanov	Team Katusha	Russia	24		24
Vladimir Karpets	Team Katusha	Russia		24	24
Rinaldo Nocentini	Ag2r–La Mondiale	Italy	4	20	24
Óscar Freire	Rabobank	Spain	22		22
Juan Manuel Gárate	Rabobank	Spain	20		20
Heinrich Haussler	Cervélo TestTeam	Germany	20		20
Luis León Sánchez	Caisse d'Epargne	Spain	20		20
Nicki Sørensen	Team Saxo Bank	Denmark	20		20
Thomas Voeckler	Bbox Bouygues Telecom	France	20		20
~~Franco Pellizotti~~	~~Liquigas~~	Italy	18		18
Jurgen Van Den Broeck	Silence–Lotto	Belgium	2	16	18
Gerald Ciolek	Team Milram	Germany	16		16
Mikhail Ignatiev	Team Katusha	Russia	16		16
Nicolas Roche	Ag2r–La Mondiale	Ireland	14		14
Stéphane Goubert	Ag2r–La Mondiale	France		12	12
Christophe Kern	Cofidis	France	10		10
Laurent Lefèvre	Bbox Bouygues Telecom	France	10		10
Tony Martin	Team Columbia–HTC	Germany	10		10
Mark Renshaw	Team Columbia–HTC	Australia	10		10
José Joaquín Rojas	Caisse d'Epargne	Spain	10		10
Carlos Sastre	Cervélo TestTeam	Spain		10	10
Amets Txurruka	Euskaltel–Euskadi	Spain	10		10
Alexandre Botcharov	Team Katusha	Russia		8	8
Sylvain Chavanel	Quick-Step	France	4	4	8
Yauheni Hutarovich	Française des Jeux	Belarus	8		8
Romain Feillu	Agritubel	France	6		6
Johannes Fröhlinger	Team Milram	Germany	6		6
George Hincapie	Team Columbia–HTC	USA		6	6
Cyril Lemoine	Skil–Shimano	France	6		6
Hayden Roulston	Cervélo TestTeam	New Zealand	6		6
Samuel Dumoulin	Cofidis	France	4		4
Leonardo Duque	Cofidis	Colombia	4		4
Vladimir Efimkin	Ag2r–La Mondiale	Russia	4		4
Markus Fothen	Team Milram	Germany	4		4
Gustav Larsson	Team Saxo Bank	Sweden	4		4
Martijn Maaskant	Garmin–Slipstream	Netherlands	4		4
Egoi Martínez	Euskaltel–Euskadi	Spain	4		4
Greg Van Avermaet	Silence–Lotto	Belgium	4		4
Peter Velits	Team Milram	Slovakia	4		4
Yukiya Arashiro	Bbox Bouygues Telecom	Japan	2		2
Cadel Evans	Silence–Lotto	Australia	2		2
David Millar	Garmin–Slipstream	United Kingdom	2		2
Sébastien Minard	Cofidis	France	2		2
Jérôme Pineau	Quick-Step	France	2		2

== Bibliography ==
- Augendre, Jacques (2016). "Guide historique" [Historical guide] (PDF). Tour de France (in French). Paris: Amaury Sport Organisation. Archived (PDF) from the original on 17 August 2016.
- "Race regulations" (PDF). Tour de France. Paris: Amaury Sport Organisation. 2009. Archived from the original (PDF) on 11 July 2009.
