= 2009 Milan–San Remo =

2009 UCI World Ranking, race 4 of 24
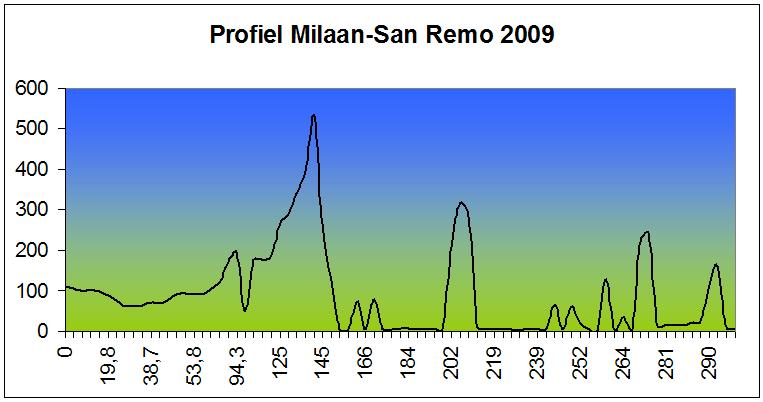
- Elevation Profile

Race details
- Dates: 21 March 2009
- Stages: 1
- Distance: 298 km (185 mi)
- Winning time: 6h 42' 32"

Results
	Winner	Mark Cavendish (GBR)	(Team Columbia–High Road)
	Second	Heinrich Haussler (GER)	(Cervélo TestTeam)
	Third	Thor Hushovd (NOR)	(Cervélo TestTeam)

The 2009 Milan–San Remo cycling race took place on 21 March 2009. It was the 100th edition of the Milan–San Remo monument classic, and followed the same route as the previous year. Manx sprint specialist Mark Cavendish won by a narrow margin. Heinrich Haussler made a late attack with 250 metres to the finish and rode away but Cavendish made up Haussler's 10m lead with 100m to go. The race was the fourth event in the inaugural UCI World Ranking.

== Team List ==
No	Code	Team
1-8	ASA	Acqua & Sapone–Caffè Mokambo
11-18	ALM	Ag2r–La Mondiale
21-28	AST	Astana
31-38	BAR	Barloworld
42-48	BBO	Bbox Bouygues Telecom
51-58	GCE	Caisse d'Epargne
61-68	FLM	Ceramica Flaminia–Bossini Docce
71-78	CTT	Cervélo TestTeam
81-88	COF	Cofidis
91-98	SDA	Diquigiovanni–Androni
101-107	EUS	Euskaltel–Euskadi
111-117	FDJ	Française des Jeux
121-128	FUJ	Fuji–Servetto
131-138	GRM	Garmin–Slipstream
141-148	ISD	ISD
151-158	LAM	Lampre–NGC
161-168	LIQ	Liquigas
171-178	LPR	LPR Brakes–Farnese Vini
181-188	QST	Quick-Step
153-160	RAB	Rabobank
201-208	SIL	Silence–Lotto
211-218	THR	Team Columbia–High Road
221-228	KAT	Team Katusha
231-238	MRM	Team Milram
241-248	SAX	Team Saxo Bank

== Results ==
	Cyclist	Team	Time
1	Mark Cavendish (UK)	Team Columbia–High Road	6h 42' 45"
2	Heinrich Haussler (GER)	Cervélo TestTeam	s.t.
3	Thor Hushovd (NOR)	Cervélo TestTeam	+ 2"
4	Allan Davis (AUS)	Quick-Step	s.t.
5	Alessandro Petacchi (ITA)	LPR Brakes–Farnese Vini	s.t.
6	Daniele Bennati (ITA)	Liquigas	s.t.
7	Aitor Galdos (ESP)	Euskaltel–Euskadi	s.t.
8	Enrico Rossi (ITA)	Ceramica Flaminia-Bossini Docce	s.t.
9	Luca Paolini (ITA)	Acqua & Sapone–Caffè Mokambo	s.t.
10	Peter Velits (SVK)	Team Milram	s.t.
