= Sergei Ivanov (cyclist) =

Soviet cyclist (born 1975)

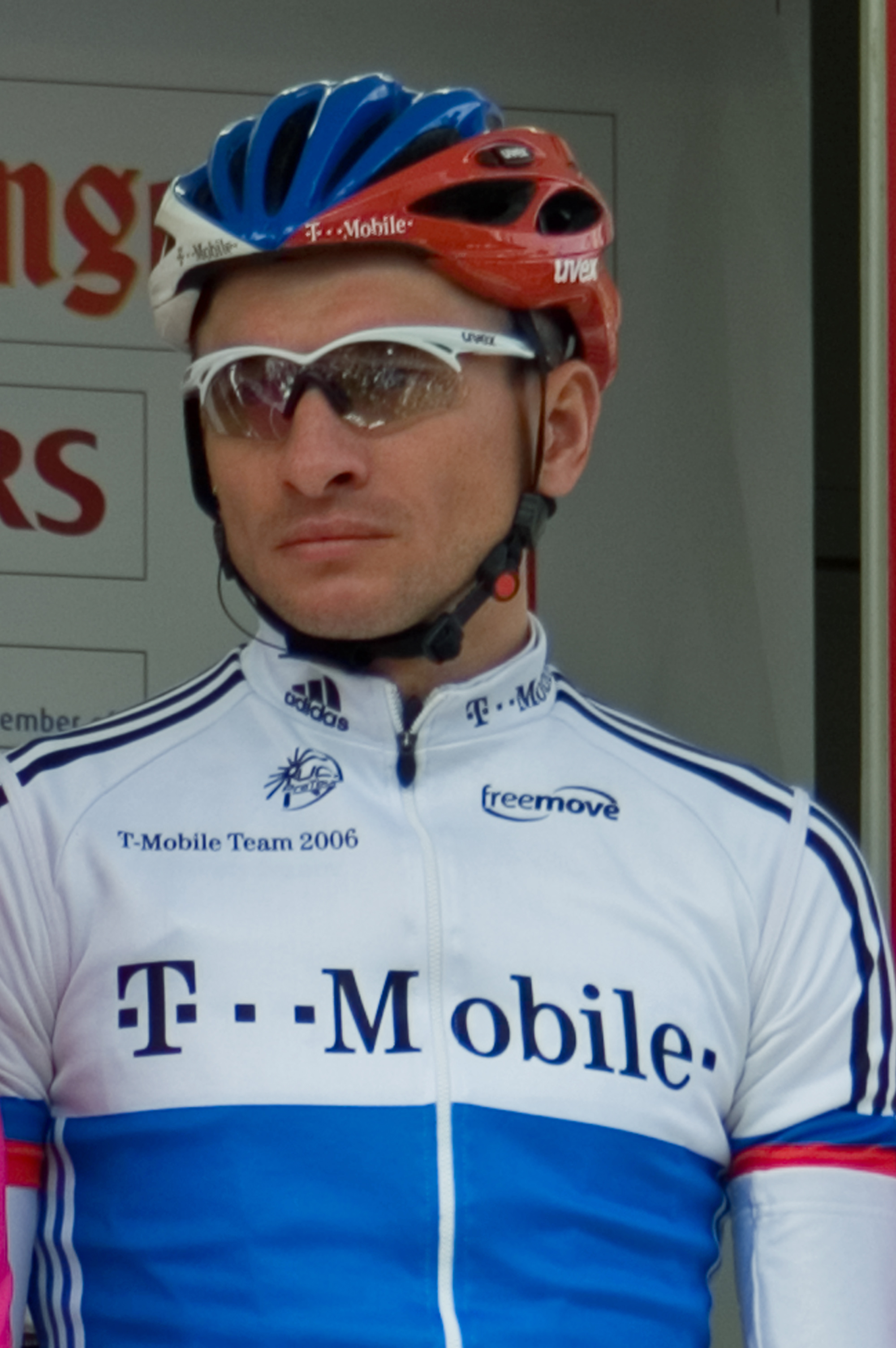
- Ivanov at the 2006 Rund um den Henninger Turm

Personal information
- Full name: Sergei Valeryevich Ivanov
- Born: 5 March 1975 (age 51) Cheboksary, Soviet Union

Cycling career
- Sport: Cycling
- Discipline: Road
- Role: Retired

Professional teams
- 1996: Lada-Samara
- 1997–2000: TVM–Farm Frites
- 2001–2003: Fassa Bortolo
- 2004–2006: T-Mobile Team
- 2007–2008: Astana
- 2009–2011: Team Katusha

Major wins
- Grand Tours Tour de France 2 Individual Stages (2001, 2009) Stage races Tour de Pologne (1998) One-day races and Classics National Road Race Championships (1998, 1999, 2000, 2005, 2008, 2009) E3 Prijs Vlaanderen (2000) Amstel Gold Race (2009)

Sergei Valeryevich Ivanov (Серге́й Валерьевич Иванов) (born 5 March 1975) is a former professional road bicycle racer, who competed between 1996 and 2011. Ivanov had been a member of six different teams, competing for CSKA Lada–Samara, TVM–Farm Frites, Fassa Bortolo, T-Mobile Team, Astana and Team Katusha. In this time he completed in five Grand Tours, and also won six national championship titles. He also won the Tour de Pologne 1998. He finished his sports career in 2009

He now lives in Bekkevoort, Belgium.

== Major results ==
1995
1st Overall Tour de Hongrie
1st Overall Vuelta Ciclista a Navarra
1996
2nd Overall Tour de l'Avenir

1st Points classification
1st Mountain classification
1st Stages 5 & 10

3rd Overall Course de la Paix
3rd Route Adélie de Vitré
4th Overall Tour de Normandie
1997
6th Brussels–Ingooigem
9th Tour de Berne
10th Overall Circuit Cycliste Sarthe – Pays de la Loire
1998
1st Road race, National Road Championships
1st Overall Tour de Pologne

1st Stages 5 & 8

1st Brussels–Ingooigem
2nd GP du canton d'Argovie
7th Overall Circuit Cycliste Sarthe – Pays de la Loire
9th Overall GP Tell
1999
1st Road race, National Road Championships
1st Druivenkoers Overijse
2nd Overall Tour de Langkawi
2nd La Côte Picarde
3rd GP Ouest–France
4th Rund um den Henninger Turm
10th Overall Circuit Cycliste Sarthe – Pays de la Loire

1st Stage 2

2000
1st Road race, National Road Championships
1st E3 Prijs Vlaanderen
3rd Overall KBC Driedaagse van De Panne-Koksijde
3rd Overall Tour de Pologne

1st Stages 6 & 7

4th Overall Tour de Luxembourg
5th Milan–San Remo
7th Paris–Camembert
2001
1st Stage 9 Tour de France
1st Stage 5 Tour de Suisse
1st Stage 4 Giro della Liguria
3rd Trofeo Pantalica
9th Overall Tour de Luxembourg
9th Kuurne–Brussels–Kuurne
2002
1st Trofeo Luis Puig
2nd Amstel Gold Race
3rd Rund um den Henninger Turm
7th Overall Ronde van Nederland

1st Stage 5

10th GP du Midi-Libre
2003
1st Stage 5 Tour de Luxembourg
1st Stage 6 TTT Tour Méditerranéen
3rd GP du canton d'Argovie
4th Coppa Bernocchi
7th Tour of Flanders
10th Paris–Roubaix
10th Rund um den Henninger Turm
2004
8th Amstel Gold Race
2005
1st Road race, National Road Championships
1st Stage 4 Tour of Britain
9th Tour of Flanders
10th Eneco Tour
2006
8th GP Ouest–France
9th La Flèche Wallonne
10th Amstel Gold Race
2008
1st National Road Race Championships
1st Overall Tour de Wallonie
3rd Overall Driedaagse van West-Vlaanderen
3rd Overall Tour of Belgium
7th Amstel Gold Race
2009
1st Amstel Gold Race
1st National Road Race Championships
1st Stage 14 Tour de France
5th Liège–Bastogne–Liège
7th Clásica de San Sebastián
9th Overall Tour of Belgium

1st Stage 1

2010
1st Points classification, Tour of Luxembourg
