= 2009 La Flèche Wallonne =

2009 UCI World Ranking, race 10 of 24
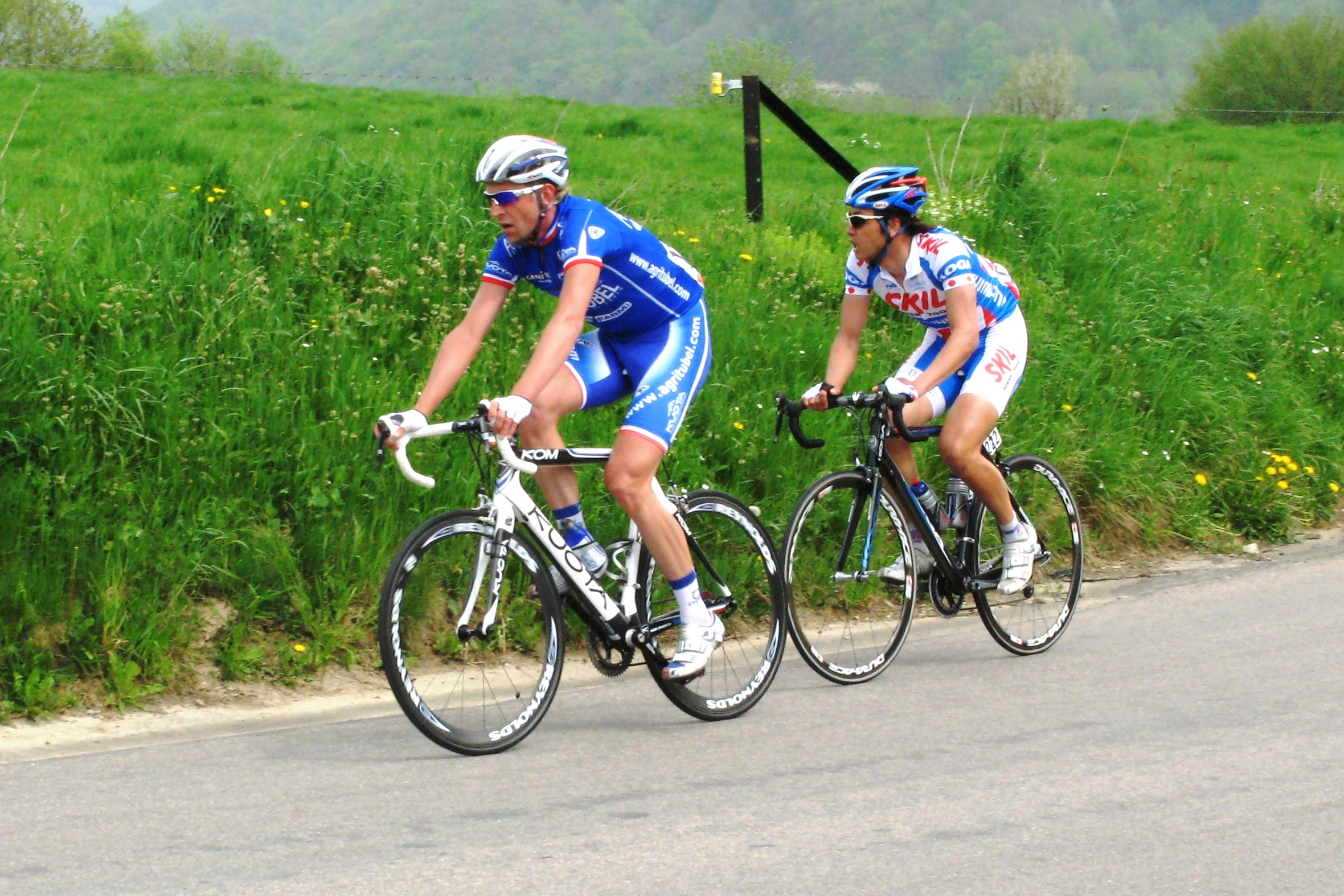
- Moreau and Beppu in the early breakaway

Race details
- Dates: 22 April
- Stages: 1
- Distance: 200 km (124.3 mi)
- Winning time: 4 hr 42' 15"

Results
	Winner	Davide Rebellin (ITA)	(Diquigiovanni–Androni)
	Second	Andy Schleck (LUX)	(Team Saxo Bank)
	Third	Damiano Cunego (ITA)	(Lampre–N.G.C.)

The 2009 La Flèche Wallonne cycling race took place on 22 April 2009. It was the 73rd running of the La Flèche Wallonne between Charleroi and Huy in Belgium.

Christophe Moreau and Fumiyuki Beppu took a very early lead, but Moreau eventually dropped Beppu on the second climb up the Mur de Huy and went off by himself. At one point, Moreau had his lead over the peloton up to 15 minutes. He was caught at 24 km to go.

Many riders tried to open a gap before the final climb of the Mur de Huy, but none were successful. On the Mur, David Lelay jumped away from the pack, which was led by Cadel Evans. Only a few hundred meters before the finish did the Australian overtake the Frenchman. Andy Schleck and Davide Rebellin followed Evans for some time, before accelerating out of his wheel. Rebellin proved to accelerate quicker than Schleck, so there was no real fight for the victory.

Rebellin's win is in doubt after his re-tested A sample in 2008 Summer Olympics was positive.

== Results ==
	Cyclist	Team	Time
1	Davide Rebellin (ITA)	Diquigiovanni–Androni	4h 42' 15"
2	Andy Schleck (LUX)	Team Saxo Bank	+ 2"
3	Damiano Cunego (ITA)	Lampre–NGC	+ 2"
4	Samuel Sánchez (ESP)	Euskaltel–Euskadi	+ 7"
5	Cadel Evans (AUS)	Silence–Lotto	+ 7"
6	Thomas Lövkvist (SWE)	Team Columbia–High Road	+ 7"
7	Alejandro Valverde (ESP)	Caisse d'Epargne	+ 11"
8	Simon Gerrans (AUS)	Cervélo TestTeam	+ 11"
9	Michael Albasini (SUI)	Team Columbia–High Road	+ 11"
10	Rinaldo Nocentini (ITA)	Ag2r–La Mondiale	+ 15"
