= 2010 Cervélo TestTeam season =

2010 Cervélo TestTeam season
Manager	Joop Alberda
One-day victories	1
Stage race overall victories	–
Stage race stage victories	10
Previous season

The 2010 season for the Cervélo TestTeam, its second and final, began in February with the Étoile de Bessèges and ended in October at the Giro di Lombardia. As they did in 2009, Cervélo TestTeam competed in 2010 as a UCI Professional Continental team with wildcard status, meaning they were eligible to be invited to any UCI ProTour event.

Most of the team's riders were retained from 2009, but the team experienced one major offseason change – the replacement of Thomas Campana as team manager with Joop Alberda.

== 2010 roster ==
Ages as of January 1, 2010

Rider	Date of birth
Davide Appollonio (ITA)	June 2, 1989 (aged 20)
Theo Bos (NED)	August 22, 1983 (aged 26)
João Correia (POR)	February 10, 1974 (aged 35)
Íñigo Cuesta (ESP)	June 2, 1969 (aged 40)
Philip Deignan (IRL)	September 7, 1983 (aged 26)
Stefan Denifl (AUT)	September 20, 1987 (aged 22)
Xavier Florencio (ESP)	December 26, 1979 (aged 30)
Volodymir Gustov (UKR)	February 15, 1977 (aged 32)
Roger Hammond (GBR)	January 30, 1974 (aged 35)
Heinrich Haussler (AUS)	February 25, 1984 (aged 25)
Jeremy Hunt (GBR)	March 12, 1974 (aged 35)
Thor Hushovd (NOR)	January 18, 1978 (aged 31)
Ted King (USA)	January 31, 1983 (aged 26)

Rider	Date of birth
Andreas Klier (GER)	January 15, 1975 (aged 34)
Ignatas Konovalovas (LTU)	December 8, 1985 (aged 24)
Brett Lancaster (AUS)	November 15, 1979 (aged 30)
Daniel Lloyd (GBR)	August 11, 1982 (aged 27)
Joaquin Novoa (ESP)	August 25, 1983 (aged 26)
Oscar Pujol (ESP)	October 16, 1983 (aged 26)
Gabriel Rasch (NOR)	April 8, 1976 (aged 33)
Martin Reimer (GER)	June 14, 1987 (aged 22)
Dominique Rollin (CAN)	October 29, 1982 (aged 27)
Carlos Sastre (ESP)	April 22, 1975 (aged 34)
Xavier Tondó (ESP)	November 5, 1978 (aged 31)
Marcel Wyss (SUI)	June 25, 1986 (aged 23)

Riders who joined the team for the 2010 season

Rider	2009 team
Davide Appollonio	neo-pro
Theo Bos	Rabobank continental team
João Correia	Bissell
Stefan Denifl	Elk Haus
Xavier Tondó	Andalucía–Cajasur

Riders who left the team during or after the 2009 season

Rider	2010 team
Daniel Fleeman	Raleigh
Simon Gerrans	Team Sky
José Ángel Gómez Marchante	Andalucía–Cajasur
Serge Pauwels	Team Sky
Hayden Roulston	Team HTC–Columbia

== One-day races ==
=== Spring classics ===
The team entered the spring season with high hopes after having been successful in the classics in 2009. Hushovd's delayed season start meant that he was not at as strong of form for the traditional spring season opener, Omloop Het Nieuwsblad, as he was in 2009 when he won it. Though he admitted that repeating his victory would be a longshot, he claimed the team had "four or five guys" who could win the race. The race was won by Team Sky's Juan Antonio Flecha in a solo breakaway, and Haussler won the 18-man sprint for second place 18 seconds behind him. The next day, the team claimed its first win of the season with Bos in the Clásica de Almería. Though Bos had lost contact with the peloton near the beginning of the race, the work of Cuesta, Deignan, and Wyss brought him back. Along with Bos came Mark Cavendish, who the young Dutchman pipped at the line for the victory.

== Stage races ==
The team's season began at the Étoile de Bessèges. This race was supposed to be Hushovd's season opener, but he pulled out days before it was run, citing illness. They did not get any victories at the event. Their next stage race was the Tour of Qatar, an event in which they were extremely successful in 2009 and thus had high expectations in 2010. In the opening stage team time trial, they originally finished second, 8 seconds behind stage winners Team Sky, but were later assessed a minute penalty because Haussler pushed Rasch at one point. The team protested the penalty. Haussler denied he pushed Rasch at all, and sporting director Jens Zemke stated that the push was for Rasch's safety, to avoid a crash, and not to gain a competitive advantage. Nonetheless, the protest was denied, and the team was put into a distant last place because of the penalty. This effectively eliminated the general classification hopes for Haussler, who had finished second in this event in 2009. Zemke considered withdrawing the team from the race, but decided against it. Haussler vowed the team would continue to be combative, though a mistake made by Haussler in the sprint finish to stage 4 kept them from a possible victory. Just as he had in 2009, Haussler won the event's points classification without winning a stage, finishing eighth or higher (and second twice) in the five road race stages. The team had also recouped the minute penalty after the race's final stage and won the teams classification, also for the second year in a row.

== Grand Tours ==
=== Giro d'Italia ===
Team leader Sastre announced in December 2009 that he would return to the Giro after winning two stages and finishing fourth overall in the 2009 Giro d'Italia. In pre-race analyses, Sastre was frequently mentioned as a rider who could contend for overall victory.

Sastre was one of a great many riders to crash in the road race stages in the Netherlands which began the Giro. He was caught up in a big crash near the finish line of stage 2, though he did not himself fall from his bike, and lost 34 seconds to other contenders like Cadel Evans and Ivan Basso. Sastre fell in stage 3 and was 46 seconds back of the stage winner, and more importantly, fellow contenders Basso and Alexander Vinokourov. Before the transfer to Italy, Sastre was in 43rd place in the overall standings, 1'40" behind race leader Vinokourov. The squad rode solidly in the stage 4 team time trial, coming home with six riders in a time that was good for fifth on the day. Sastre's troubles continued in stage 7 in Tuscany. The route for the stage incorporated unpaved roads, and the day on which the stage was run happened to have heavy rainfall. This made the course muddy and very difficult. Sastre crashed multiple times, and crossed the finish line covered in mud over five minutes behind the other overall contenders. He was speculated to be completely out of overall contention at this point, sitting over seven minutes back of Vinokourov in the standings. Tondó, riding his first Giro, had been near the leaders in stage 7, but had dropped back to help Sastre to the finish. In stage 8, Sastre continued to struggle, and specifically released Tondó to ride his own race. Tondó rode most of the final climb to Monte Terminillo ahead of the pink jersey peloton and took third on the stage, while Sastre lost over a minute to the race's elite and fell to 8'10" back.

Stage 11 into L'Aquila caused major changes in the overall standings. Over 50 riders formed a leading group ahead of the peloton, and this group held at one point an advantage of 20 minutes. Sastre, Tondó, Wyss, and Gustov all made this selection, and Wyss and Gustov joined riders from Caisse d'Epargne, Team Sky, and Team Saxo Bank in driving the leading group, since all four teams stood to have riders highly placed in the overall standings should the group stay away. The overall contenders took back some of the time from the leaders' biggest advantage, but still ceded nearly 13 minutes to them. The day's results put both Tondó and Sastre in the top ten overall, at fourth and eighth respectively. Both riders finished with the peloton in stage 14, which went over Monte Grappa, conceding over two minutes to race favorites like Basso and Vincenzo Nibali, but moving up to third and sixth overall. Tondó lost out on overall contention in the next stage, losing 25 minutes on Monte Zoncolan. Sastre was sixth on this stage, 2'44" back of stage winner Basso. This put him in fourth overall before the uphill individual time trial to Plan de Corones after the second rest day.

Sastre was unable to capitalize on this position, however. He was just 19th in the time trial, losing over a minute to his rivals. The next day's stage was conquered by a morning breakaway. Konovalovas had made the early split, but was unable to stay with the leaders to the finish in Pejo Terme, finishing ninth on the day. Sastre lost five seconds at the finish line, but maintained fifth overall. In stage 19, Tondó again made a morning breakaway, but this group was not destined for success as were the leaders on the L'Aquila stage. They were caught on the Passo del Mortirolo by the Liquigas–Doimo-led main group. Liquigas–Doimo's support riders rode a strong tempo that made others fall from the pace held by Basso, Nibali, and Michele Scarponi. Sastre was among the many riders to fall. Between the Mortirolo and the stage-ending climb of Aprica, Sastre and Vinokourov, Evans, John Gadret, and race leader David Arroyo came together as a chase group, but they lost time throughout the Aprica climb and could not bridge back to the leading Italian trio. Sastre and Vinokourov briefly held a time gap over race leader Basso in the Giro's final road stage, but both finished well back of him at the finish. Sastre was 60th in the time trial which closed out the Giro, securing eighth overall. The squad finished the Giro without any victories, placing seventh in the Trofeo Fast Team and 19th in the Trofeo Super Team.

While eighth overall was widely derided as a disappointment for a rider thought to be an overall contender and one gifted 13 minutes, it was revealed shortly after the Giro concluded that Sastre's injuries upon crashing in the Netherlands and Tuscany were much worse than first reported. He was diagnosed with a spinal disc herniation by team doctors, an injury that briefly put his Tour de France participation in doubt. Sastre stated that the team knew from the time he first crashed that the injuries likely would keep him from overall contention, but they kept quiet about it while the race was being run so as to not make excuses for his performance. The injury has been recognized as changing the perception of his eighth-place finish.

=== Tour de France ===
Sastre led the squad sent to the Tour de France. Haussler was supposed to be on the squad as well, but was replaced by Lloyd when his recurrent knee injury required surgery. Hushovd was also present, aiming for a second straight points classification win. Florencio was named to the squad at first, but he was later pulled because he had used a substance for treating saddle sores that contained ephedrine, which is banned. The team's stated reason for pulling him was that he had violated internal rules which require riders to secure permission from medical staff before taking any medication or supplement. He was not replaced, and the team began the Tour with a squad of only eight riders instead of the usual nine. Florencio later criticized the decision, after the team's demise later in the year, as hampering his chances to obtain a contract for 2011.

Hushovd took third place behind Alessandro Petacchi and Mark Renshaw in the Tour's first road race stage, as they were three of only five riders to contest the sprint after a massive crash in the stage's final kilometer thinned the field greatly. The next day, a series of crashes took place, felling overall contenders like Lance Armstrong and Andy Schleck among dozens of others. With several groups on the road fragmented by the repeated crashes, race leader Fabian Cancellara negotiated a neutralization of the stage finish, wherein no one would sprint for the line and everyone who was together when the crashes began would get the same finishing time relative to solo stage winner Sylvain Chavanel. Hushovd took a meaningless seventh place on the day, but was angered by the decision, since it nullified the team's work on the day. All eight Cervélo riders had escaped crashes and Hushovd had several support riders with him for the finish, a finish that the slowdown denied him a chance to contest. The next day's stage incorporated many cobbled sectors known for featuring in the difficult classic cycle race Paris–Roubaix, including perhaps its most difficult, the Arenberg Trench. Thus, the day was expected to feature many crashes, and did. Cancellara led a group of six, working for his team leader Schleck, past a major pileup 40 km (25 mi) from the finish. Hushovd followed in this group, and since Cancellara was exhausted having worked for Schleck all day, Hushovd easily took the stage win. This result gave him the green jersey as the points classification leader. The next three stages featured more typical field sprints. Hushovd retained his green jersey through these stages, though he did not come close to winning any of them.

Sastre finished with the first group, containing most of the race's top favorites, in the Tour's first mountain stage finishing at Morzine-Avoriaz. The result gained him 16 places in the general classification, moving from 28th to 12th. The next day, however, he finished three minutes behind the main group of the race's top riders (who themselves finished two minutes behind Alberto Contador and Schleck), falling to 17th and never again coming close to cracking the race's top ten.

After another lackluster performance in a field sprint in stage 11, Hushovd lost the green jersey to Petacchi. In stage 12, Hushovd made the morning's breakaway and got 10 points in intermediate sprints, taking the jersey back. He lost it to Petacchi again after stage 13, when the Italian finished five places better in the sprint for the finish line. Stage 16 included an ascent of the Col du Tourmalet, but Hushovd was able to take tenth place in this stage (first position from the peloton), thanks to work from teammates including Sastre. This again put the green jersey on Hushovd's shoulders, but he lost it for good after stage 18 when he was a distant 14th in the sprint. Hushovd took seventh on the Champs-Élysées, but he ended up just third in the points classification, behind both the winner Petacchi and Mark Cavendish. Sastre was the team's best-placed rider in the final overall standings, but he was over 26 minutes behind Tour champion Contador, for 20th place. The squad was 19th in the teams classification.

=== Vuelta a España ===
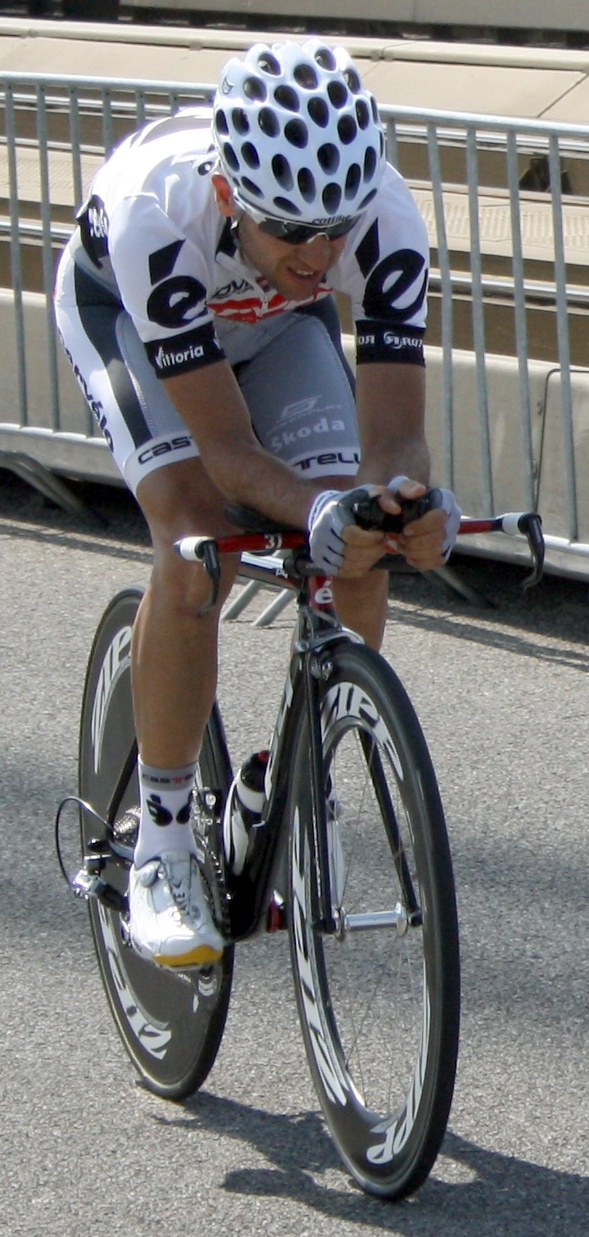
Carlos Sastre started and finished all three Grand Tours in 2010, and finished eighth in both the Giro and the Vuelta.

Sastre had planned at the beginning of the season to ride two of the three Grand Tours, and was unsure after the Giro whether he would ride the Tour or the Vuelta. In an atypical decision, Sastre lined up in Seville for the Vuelta start after starting the Giro and the Tour as well. Hushovd was also on the squad, with the aim of honing his form prior to the world championships road race. Also on the start list was Cuesta, starting the race for the 17th consecutive year, breaking his own record. With reigning Vuelta champion Alejandro Valverde unable to defend his crown due to a doping suspension handed down earlier in the year, race officials gave bib number one to Cuesta in commemoration of this achievement.

Despite the race starting mere days after the team announced it would fold after the season, the squad turned in a solid ride in the stage 1 team time trial, finishing with five riders 13 seconds back of Team HTC–Columbia's winning time, for fourth place. In an unusually early mountain stage two days later, Tondó and Florencio both broke into the top ten overall, at eighth and tenth respectively, by finishing within 30 seconds of stage winner and new race leader Philippe Gilbert. Both lost time the next day, but Tondó limited his losses to 19 seconds and actually moved up in the overall standings as a result, to seventh. Sastre was 25th on the day, dropping a minute and 34 seconds, and later claimed that his race schedule for the season, riding all three Grand Tours, was beginning to leave him tired. Florencio had finished the stage in the last group on the road, 14 minutes down to drop well out of the overall standings. Bos placed ninth in the field sprint finish to stage 5 in Lorca. Hushovd finished 43 seconds behind the peloton, opting to preserve himself for the next day. In stage 6, which was mostly flat but featured the second-category Alto de la Cresta del Gallo climb towards the finish, 70 riders made all the day's selections and finished together. Hushovd was present at the front of this group and took a sprint win over Daniele Bennati and Grega Bole. The Alto de la Cresta del Gallo had proved too difficult for sprinters like Tyler Farrar, Alessandro Petacchi, and Mark Cavendish, leaving Hushovd with a smaller field of rival sprinters and a rather easy victory.

Stage 8 was the next mountain stage, and it reshuffled the overall standings somewhat. David Moncoutié won the stage from the morning breakaway, Tondó and Sastre both finished the stage in the top ten, and Tondó moved up to fourth overall, 42 seconds behind new race leader Igor Antón. Sastre moved up from 21st to 17th with the result. The next major stage was stage 11, ending with a short, explosive climb to Vallnord in Andorra. Tondó finished the stage third, just behind Antón and Ezequiel Mosquera, who had both put in attacks in the final kilometer to try to win the stage. Cuesta and Sastre finished ninth and tenth respectively on the day, which moved Sastre up to 13th. Stage 14 was the first mountain stage in the Vuelta's difficult final week. Tondó again rode with the race's elite for most of the day, finishing seventh and conceding 39 seconds to stage winner Joaquim Rodríguez. This result cost him a place in the overall standings, as Ezequiel Mosquera, who had been behind him, finished ahead in the stage. Sastre was 15th, but moved up to tenth overall as a result. The next day ended with a very high climb at Lagos de Covadonga. Tondó lost roughly two minutes to the race's elite riders at the finish, coming home 23rd and slipping to fifth overall as a result. Sastre also lost time, finishing 14th, but he moved up to ninth overall as Rubén Plaza lost considerably more time. Both lost more time on the Alto de Cotobello the next day, with Tondó falling to eighth in the standings. Both Tondó and Sastre turned in solid rides in the stage 17 individual time trial. Eleventh and thirteenth respectively meant they gained time against most of the race's top riders, as the riders who finished better than them were mostly time trial specialists with no designs on the overall standings. They moved into sixth and eighth overall. Tondó rode to fifth place on the Bola del Mundo in the race's queen stage, but since Fränk Schleck finished ahead of him in fourth, he was unable to overtake the Luxembourger for fifth overall. Tondó finished the race in sixth place, with Sastre eighth. Cervélo was the only team with two riders in the top ten of the final overall standings. The squad finished fourth in the teams classification, even though they had only five riders (Tondó, Sastre, Florencio, Cuesta, and Pujol) finish the race. For his part, it was the first time in his career that Tondó had finished a Grand Tour.

== Season victories ==
Date	Race	Competition	Rider	Country	Location
February 12	Tour of Qatar, Points classification	UCI Asia Tour	Heinrich Haussler (GER)	Qatar	
February 12	Tour of Qatar, Teams classification	UCI Asia Tour	(Note: The riders on the squad were Martin Reimer, Jeremy Hunt, Heinrich Haussler, Theo Bos, Roger Hammond, Andreas Klier, Davide Appollonio, and Gabriel Rasch)	Qatar	
February 28	Clásica de Almería	UCI Europe Tour	Theo Bos (NED)	Spain	Almería
March 7	Vuelta a Murcia, Stage 5	UCI Europe Tour	Theo Bos (NED)	Spain	Murcia
March 13	Paris–Nice, Stage 6	UCI World Ranking	Xavier Tondó (ESP)	France	Tourrettes-sur-Loup
March 24	Volta a Catalunya, Stage 3	UCI ProTour	Xavier Tondó (ESP)	Spain	La Seu d'Urgell
April 14	Vuelta a Castilla y León, Stage 1	UCI Europe Tour	Theo Bos (NED)	Spain	Burgos
April 15	Vuelta a Castilla y León, Stage 2	UCI Europe Tour	Theo Bos (NED)	Spain	Palencia
April 18	Vuelta a Castilla y León, Points classification	UCI Europe Tour	Theo Bos (NED)	Spain	
May 17	Tour of California, Stage 2	UCI America Tour	Brett Lancaster (AUS)	United States	Santa Rosa
June 13	Tour de Suisse, Stage 2	UCI World Ranking	Heinrich Haussler (GER)	Switzerland	Sierre
July 6	Tour de France, Stage 3	UCI World Ranking	Thor Hushovd (NOR)	France	Arenberg Porte du Hainaut
August 20	Tour du Limousin, Stage 4	UCI Europe Tour	Davide Appolonio (ITA)	France	Limoges
September 2	Vuelta a España, Stage 6	UCI World Ranking	Thor Hushovd (NOR)	Spain	Murcia
