= 2009 Cervélo TestTeam season =

2009 Cervélo TestTeam season
Manager	Thomas Campana
One-day victories	4
Stage race overall victories	none
Stage race stage victories	19
Next season

The 2009 season for the Cervélo TestTeam, its first, began in February with the Tour of Qatar and ended in October with the Giro di Lombardia. Though they applied for UCI ProTour status after their formation, the team competed in 2009 as a UCI Professional Continental team with wildcard status. This means that although they were not automatically invited to UCI ProTour events, they were eligible to be invited. Despite not being a ProTour team, they effectively competed at the highest level available in the sport - seventeen of the twenty-four UCI World Ranking events invited the team, including all three Grand Tours.

The team formed for the 2009 season after their title sponsor, Cervélo, was outbid to remain the bicycle frame sponsor of Team Saxo Bank. The owners of the company wanted to remain at the highest level of pro cycling, and formed the TestTeam. The team's leader is 2008 Tour de France winner Carlos Sastre, who was one of the first riders to join the team.

Cervélo TestTeam established itself as a strong classics team in its first year of existence, with three victories and seven other podium finishes in the spring season. The team was also prolific in winning individual stages in stage races, while they did not have an overall win in a stage race this season.

The team's general manager is Thomas Campana, who the owners of Cervélo actively sought to lead the team in the weeks after its formation.

== 2009 roster ==
Ages as of January 1, 2009

Rider	Date of birth
Íñigo Cuesta (ESP)	June 2, 1969 (aged 39)
Philip Deignan (IRL)	September 7, 1983 (aged 25)
Daniel Fleeman (GBR)	October 3, 1982 (aged 26)
Xavier Florencio (ESP)	December 26, 1979 (aged 29)
Simon Gerrans (AUS)	May 16, 1980 (aged 28)
Volodymir Gustov (UKR)	February 15, 1977 (aged 31)
Roger Hammond (GBR)	January 30, 1974 (aged 34)
Heinrich Haussler (GER)	February 25, 1984 (aged 24)
Jeremy Hunt (GBR)	March 12, 1974 (aged 34)
Thor Hushovd (NOR)	January 18, 1978 (aged 30)
Ted King (USA)	January 31, 1983 (aged 25)
Andreas Klier (GER)	January 15, 1975 (aged 33)

Rider	Date of birth
Ignatas Konovalovas (LTU)	December 8, 1985 (aged 23)
Brett Lancaster (AUS)	November 15, 1979 (aged 29)
Daniel Lloyd (GBR)	August 11, 1982 (aged 26)
José Ángel Gómez Marchante (ESP)	May 30, 1980 (aged 28)
Joaquin Novoa (ESP)	August 25, 1983 (aged 25)
Serge Pauwels (BEL)	November 21, 1983 (aged 25)
Oscar Pujol (ESP)	October 16, 1983 (aged 25)
Gabriel Rasch (NOR)	April 8, 1976 (aged 32)
Martin Reimer (GER)	June 14, 1987 (aged 21)
Dominique Rollin (CAN)	October 29, 1982 (aged 26)
Hayden Roulston (NZL)	January 10, 1981 (aged 27)
Carlos Sastre (ESP)	April 22, 1975 (aged 33)
Marcel Wyss (SUI)	June 25, 1986 (aged 22)

=== Riders' 2008 teams ===
Rider	2008 team
Íñigo Cuesta	CSC–Saxo Bank
Philip Deignan	Ag2r–La Mondiale
Daniel Fleeman	An Post–M Donnelly–Grant Thornton–Sean Kelly Team
Xavier Florencio	Bouygues Télécom
Simon Gerrans	Crédit Agricole
Volodymir Gustov	CSC–Saxo Bank
Roger Hammond	Team Columbia
Heinrich Haussler	Gerolsteiner
Jeremy Hunt	Crédit Agricole
Thor Hushovd	Crédit Agricole
Ted King	Bissell
Andreas Klier	Team Columbia
Ignatas Konovalovas	Crédit Agricole

Rider	2008 team
Brett Lancaster	Team Milram
Daniel Lloyd	An Post–M Donnelly–Grant Thornton–Sean Kelly Team
José Ángel Gómez Marchante	Scott–American Beef
Joaquin Novoa	neo-pro
Serge Pauwels	Topsport Vlaanderen
Oscar Pujol	neo-pro
Gabriel Rasch	Crédit Agricole
Martin Reimer	neo-pro
Dominique Rollin	Toyota–United
Hayden Roulston	ex-pro (Health Net Pro Cycling Team, 2006)
Carlos Sastre	CSC–Saxo Bank
Marcel Wyss	neo-pro

== Genesis of the new team ==
The founding of Cervélo TestTeam was a direct reaction to Team CSC Saxo Bank switching to Specialized. A press release issued by the team at the time they were first founded indirectly stated that Specialized had outbid them to become Saxo Bank's new supplier. Sastre and Roger Hammond were two of the first cyclists to be rumored to be joining the new team. Cervélo cofounder Gerard Vroomen has said that bicycle manufacturers have for long not gotten much out of sponsorship and supplier deals with professional teams and that their money was better spent fronting their own team. He approached Sastre two days after the conclusion of the 2008 Tour de France and told him about the new team, at which time Sastre verbally indicated to Vroomen that he would join the team. The other highly prominent cyclist on the squad is former Tour de France green jersey winner Thor Hushovd, who needed a new team following the collapse of Crédit Agricole after the 2008 season, and brought a number of Crédit Agricole riders to the team after signing. Hushovd has stated that Sastre's presence on the team legitimized it in his eyes and in those of other top pro cyclists.

In the six months between the end of the Tour de France and the team's first training camp in Portugal in January 2009, a roster of 25 riders and an entire supporting staff was hired. The team is one of the most broadly international in professional cycling, with 13 nations represented by those 25 riders. At the first presentation of the team in Portugal, Vroomen also evoked legendary cyclist Fausto Coppi having ridden for a team sponsored by the bicycle industry (that sponsor being Bianchi Bicycles) as a motivation for sponsorship of the new team. On February 11, the team was one of thirteen assigned "Wild Card" status by the UCI, allowing the organizers of UCI ProTour events to select them to race in their event despite not having ProTour status as a team.

== One-day races ==
=== Spring classics ===
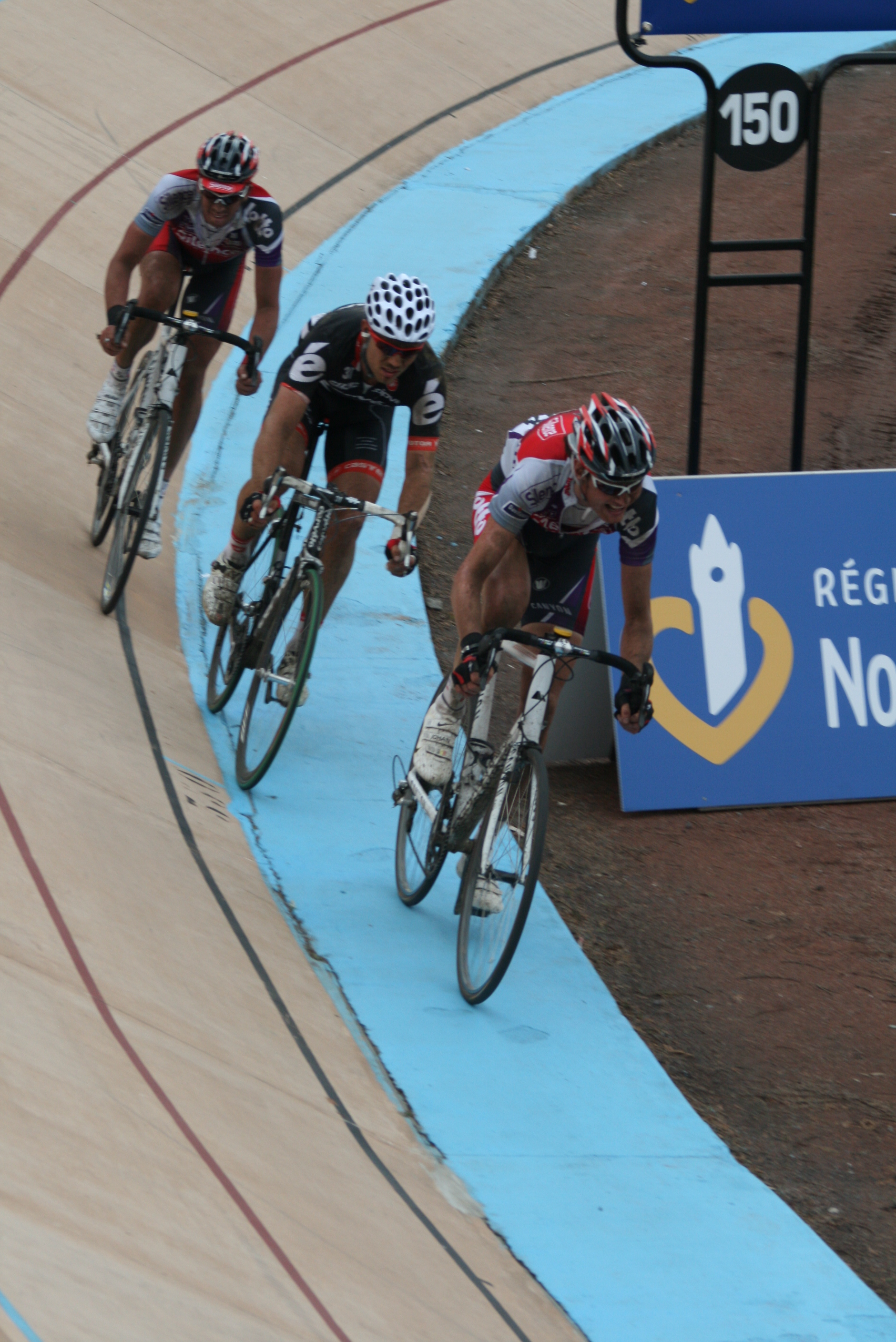
Johan Vansummeren, Hushovd, and Leif Hoste as they approach the finish line of Paris–Roubaix inside the Roubaix velodrome.

Right away, Cervélo established itself as a strong classics team. Hushovd won Omloop Het Nieuwsblad as he outsprinted seven others in a chasing pack that caught two leading riders, including teammate Heinrich Haussler, just before the finish. The next day, the team finished on the podium at two different events, with Simon Gerrans finishing third in a sprint finish at the Gran Premio di Lugano and Jeremy Hunt likewise third in a sprint at Kuurne–Brussels–Kuurne. The team got its second victory at the Giro del Mendrisiotto two weeks later, as Ignatas Konovalovas soloed to the finish line ahead of a 12-man chase pack.

The team took two of three podium places in Milan–San Remo later in March. The race came down to its traditional closing sprint, which Haussler opened early with what seemed to be an insurmountable lead, only to be pipped for the victory by Mark Cavendish. Their speed was so great that they attained a 2-second gap over the other 32 riders in the sprint after only a few hundred meters of sprinting. Hushovd came in third. While the team was pleasantly surprised to get two podium places in the classic, Haussler himself appeared quite despondent at losing the sprint to Cavendish when talking to reporters after the race.

At the Tour of Flanders in April, Haussler took another second place, although this one more resembled a victory as it was a 29-man sprint for second a minute behind the event's winner Stijn Devolder. Hushovd returned to the podium at Paris–Roubaix, getting to the line ahead of Leif Hoste and Johan Van Summeren in third just over a minute behind Tom Boonen. Haussler also did well in this event, finishing seventh, three minutes behind Boonen. It was after this event that Haussler became the leader of the inaugural UCI World Ranking. Dominique Rollin made the podium at Scheldeprijs Vlaanderen, finishing third in a sprint behind Alessandro Petacchi and Kenny Van Hummel. In June, as the early season one-day races were coming to an end, Haussler claimed a victory in the GP Triberg-Schwarzwald, outsprinting seven breakaway companions.

In addition to their victories and numerous podiums, the team also had several close misses to that level of success. Dwars door Vlaanderen, E3 Prijs Vlaanderen, Brabantse Pijl, the Gran Premio Miguel Indurain, the Amstel Gold Race, La Flèche Wallonne, and Liège–Bastogne–Liège all had Cervélo riders finish in the top ten. The only major race on their busy spring one-day schedule to not see a Cervélo rider finish at least this high was the Gran Premio dell'Insubria, where their best-placed rider was 13th.

=== Fall races ===
Gerrans picked up his first career win in a one-day race at the GP Ouest-France, outsprinting four breakaway companions for the win. The team had come to the event thinking Hushovd would be their leader, but he pulled out mid-race after feeling himself to be on poor form. The win came a day after Emma Pooley of the women's Cervélo TestTeam won the GP de Plouay-Bretagne.

Roger Hammond took two other strong results in the fall season, second place at the Sparkassen Giro and fourth in Paris–Bourges. The team also sent squads to the Sparkassen Münsterland Giro, Paris–Tours, the Giro del Piemonte, and the Giro di Lombardia, with Martin Reimer in ninth at Paris–Tours their best result.

== Stage races ==
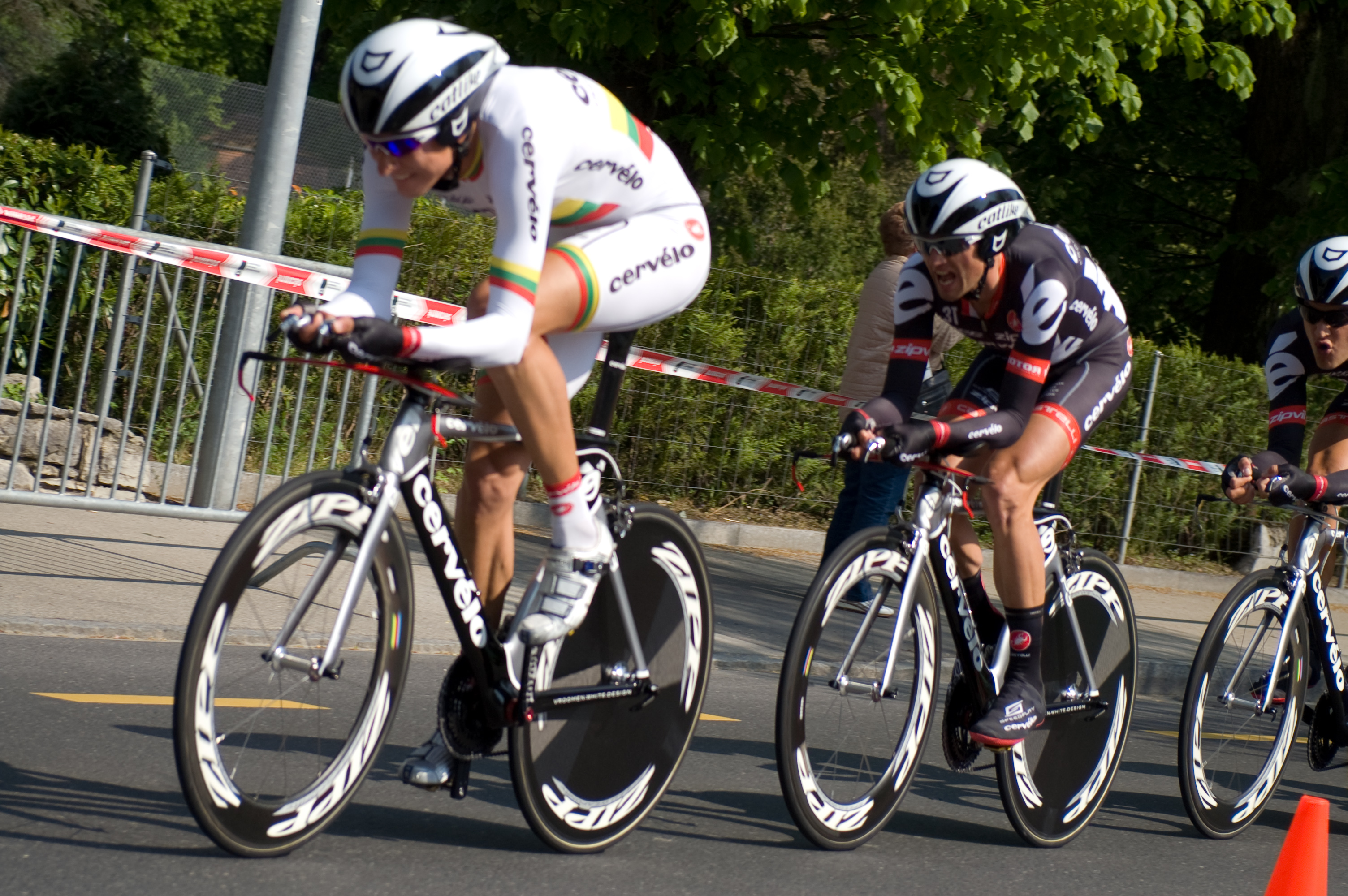
Cervélo TestTeam riding the team time trial stage of the Tour de Romandie, being led by Lithuanian national champion Ignatas Konovalovas.

The first race of the season, and thus in the history of Cervélo TestTeam, was the Tour of Qatar. Though the race's general classification was won by Tom Boonen, Cervélo was quite successful in the event as well. Roger Hammond won the second stage, into Al Khor Corniche, gaining the golden jersey as race leader in the process. It was seen at the time, and attributed by Hammond, as having been a total team effort. With four top-five finishes in the Tour of Qatar, Haussler won the event's points classification and was also the best young rider. Behind Tour of Qatar winner Boonen in the event's final general classification were five Cervélo riders second through sixth, giving the team a convincing victory in the team classification. The next stage race in which the team got a victory was the Tour of California, with Hushovd winning a mass sprint finish in the third stage, after Cervélo's leadout train successfully outmaneuvered Team Columbia–High Road's. Haussler took two stage wins later in the month at the Volta ao Algarve.

In March, Haussler got a stage win in Paris–Nice, winning a mass sprint in Stage 2. The win briefly gave him the lead in the points classification, as he wore the green jersey in the following stage. The team next took stage wins in the Volta a Catalunya, which was concurrent to the Giro d'Italia. Hushovd, who had chosen to skip the Giro in order to better focus on the Tour de France, won the Stage 1 time trial and a mass sprint finish to Stage 6. He was notably defeated, however, in a sprint finish to Stage 5 by an unheralded rider from Team Katusha, Nikolay Trusov.

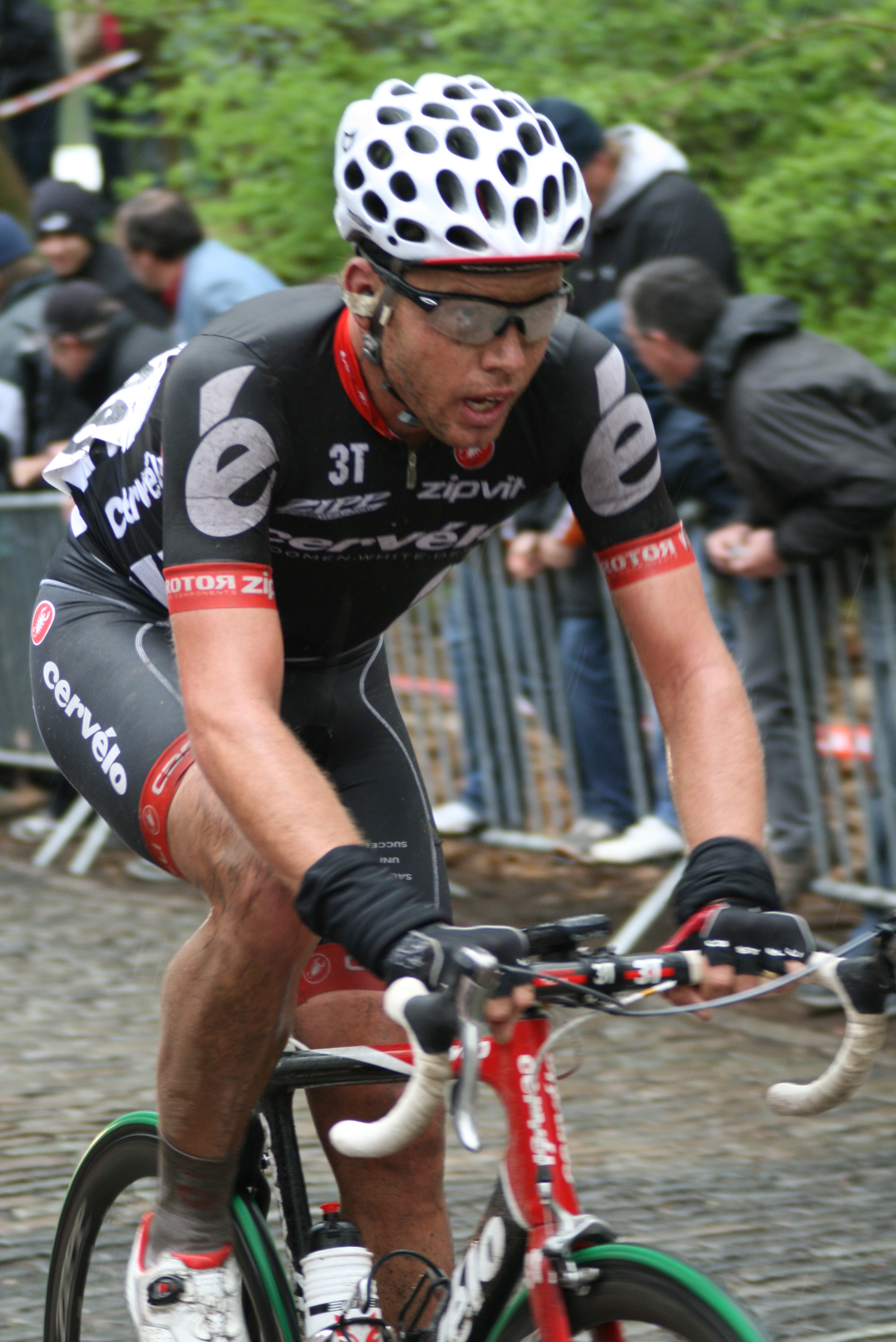
Brett Lancaster, taken during Gent–Wevelgem.

In August, Jeremy Hunt won a stage in Danmark Rundt, while Roger Hammond finished on the event's final podium, in third. Though the team did not win any stage in the Vuelta a Burgos, they were the only to finish with two riders (Íñigo Cuesta and Philip Deignan) in the top ten overall. After finishing second in the first stage of the Tour du Limousin, Xavier Florencio maintained his high positioning and finished on the event's final podium in third. A strong squad, headed by the team's most prolific winners Hushovd and Haussler, was sent to the Tour du Poitou-Charentes. Brett Lancaster took third in the stage 3 individual time trial, to move into second overall, and held that position through the conclusion of the race. Hushovd and Haussler took back-to-back stage wins to close out the event, with Hushovd's stage 4 win coming the same day as the stage 3 time trial, just hours later. In the Tour of Missouri in September, Hushovd won the mass sprint finish to stage 3, becoming the only rider on the season to defeat Mark Cavendish in a group sprint on two occasions. The victory had been achieved by a change in tactics from the previous flat stages – instead of a proper leadout, members of Hushovd's train instead made repeated attacks in the race's final two kilometers. That, along with the finish's rolling profile, gave Hushovd his winning advantage, and the stage win briefly gave him the overall race lead. Despite a surprising defeat to Philippe Gilbert in a sprint finish to the race's concluding stage, Hushovd won the Tour of Missouri's points classification. The team did not get any more stage wins on the season, but Hammond finished on the final podium at two events, the Tour of Britain and Franco-Belge.

The team's success was not as frequent in short stage races as it was in one-day races; they sent squads to the Tour de Langkawi, Tirreno–Adriatico, the Vuelta a Castilla y León, the Vuelta al País Vasco, the Tour de Romandie, Bayern-Rundfahrt, the Tour de Suisse, the Ster Elektrotoer, the Giro del Trentino, Tour of Austria, the Brixia Tour, and the Tour of Ireland, but did not obtain a notable result in any of them.

== Grand Tours ==
=== Giro d'Italia ===
The team was one of 22 to participate in the Giro d'Italia. Sastre was the team's leader in the race, with finishing on the podium his explicit goal. After mostly lying low in the race's first two weeks, with Sastre shadowing the other overall contenders to stay within striking distance, the team claimed four stage victories in the race's third week. Simon Gerrans won stage 14, attacking his breakaway companions (including teammate Philip Deignan, who worked for Gerrans once it was clear that the two of them wouldn't be needed to support Sastre on the stage) to reach the race's summit finish first. Two days later, Sastre won what was called the Giro's queen stage, riding away on his own from race leader Denis Menchov and a group of overall contenders to the top of Monte Petrano to win the grueling, seven-hour-plus climbing-intensive stage.

Though the victory at the time propelled Sastre into third in the overall classification, he lost significant time two days later on the stage into Blockhaus, seeming off the form he had had going into Monte Petrano. Sastre rebounded to win the stage into Mount Vesuvius, two days after Blockhaus, with another long solo attack. The Giro's final time trial was won by Ignatas Konovalovas, while Sastre finished the race in fourth place.

Thanks to Sastre's stage wins and high overall placing, and Gerrans' and Konovalovas' stage wins, Cervélo TestTeam was briefly the leader of the World Ranking team classification, in the standings published after the Giro.

=== Tour de France ===
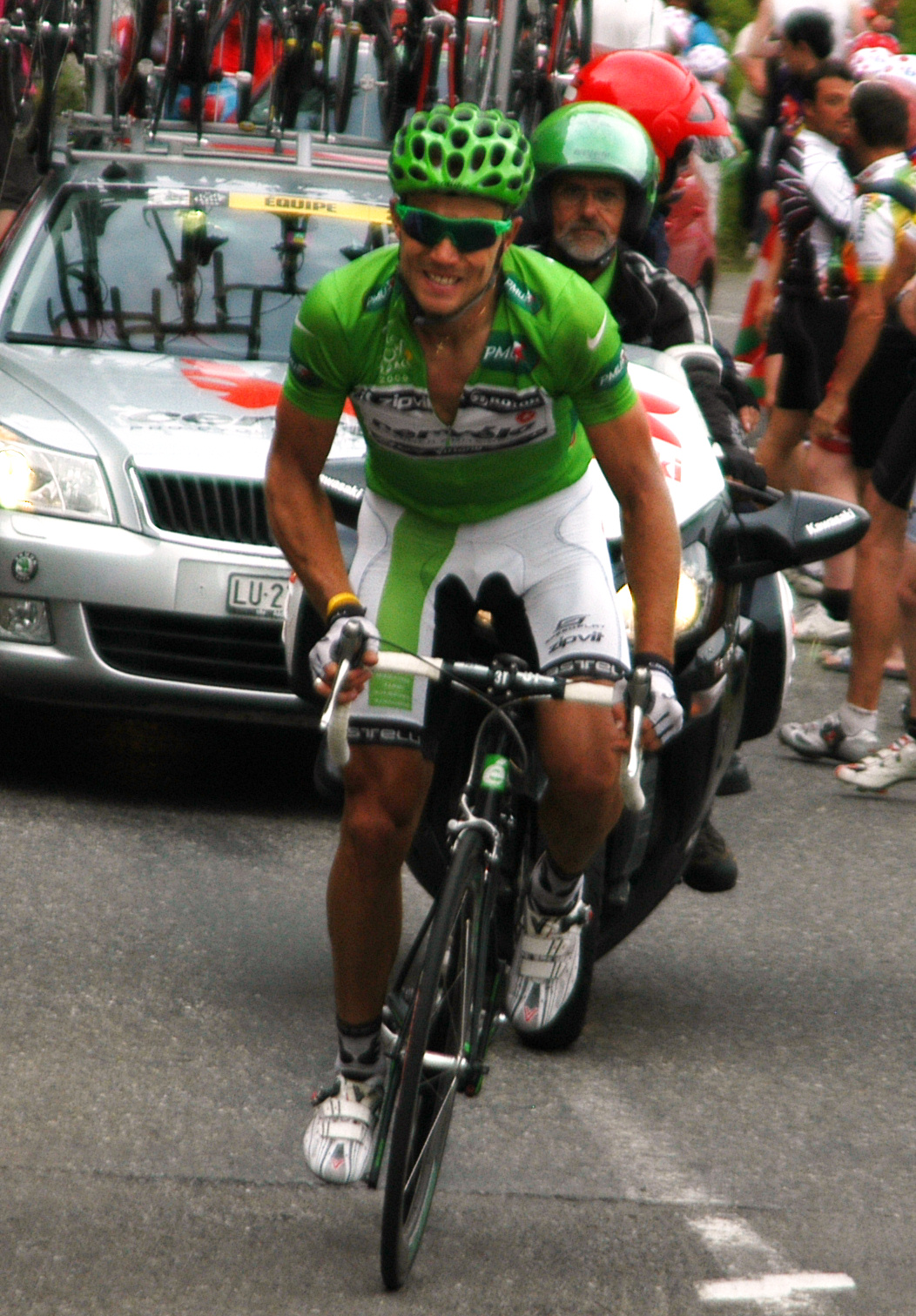
Hushovd during his stage 17 solo breakaway, which all but cinched the final green jersey for him.

The team was one of 20 invited to the Tour de France. Sastre, the champion from 2008, announced that he intended to defend that title in November 2008. His status as defending champion was largely overshadowed by the intra-squad rivalry from the Astana team between Alberto Contador and Lance Armstrong, and by the latter's return to the Tour for the first time in four years. Armstrong and Sastre also touched off some controversy with each other, when Armstrong called the 2008 Tour "a bit of a joke" for Sastre having won it and for Christian Vande Velde finishing fifth overall. Sastre claimed Armstrong needed to show more respect after that statement. Armstrong eventually apologized to Sastre for the comments, which put the spat behind them. Sastre himself had a somewhat bizarre relationship with the media during the Tour, blasting them for calling the race "boring" and for focusing, in Sastre's opinion, too much on the Contador-Armstrong rivalry, while Sastre did not seem particularly motivated to win the race. Sastre apologized four days later, saying he was in a "bad frame of mind" when he made the comments.

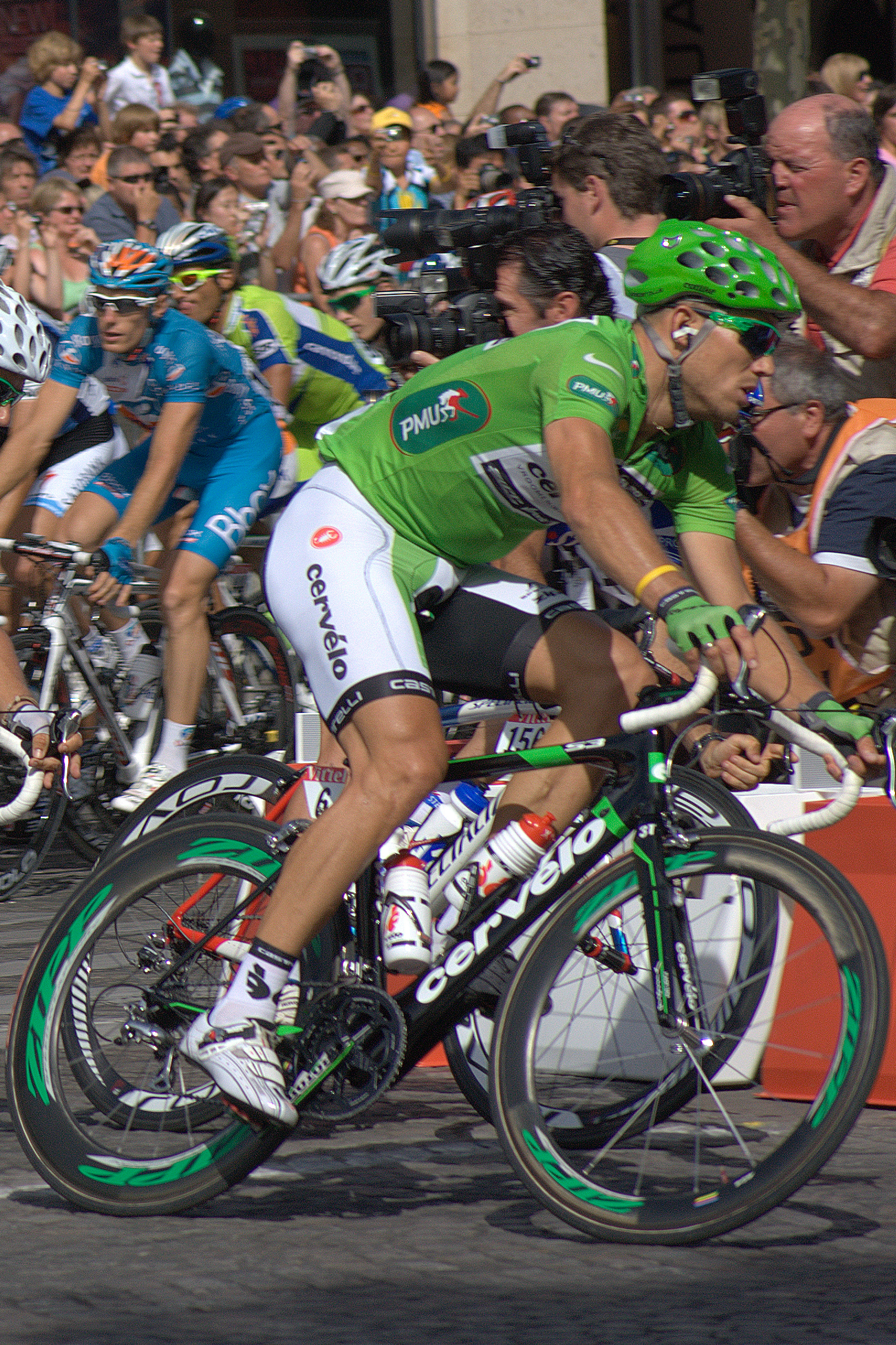
Hushovd riding home with the green jersey in the Tour's final stage.

On the road, Hushovd emerged as a favorite to win the green jersey for a second time (having previously won it with Crédit Agricole in 2005). He won the uphill sprint finish to Stage 6 in Barcelona after having lost out to Mark Cavendish in sprints in Stages 2 and 3. Hushovd and Cavendish quickly emerged as the top if not only contenders for the points classification title, as Hushovd claiming two intermediate sprints in Stage 8 gave him the green jersey, but only by 11 points. Cavendish reclaimed the jersey after his victory in Stage 11, his fourth, but Hushovd won it back after the medium-mountain Stage 13, when he finished in the yellow jersey group. The two were in a sprint for the green jersey points available for 13th place in Stage 14, after a 12-man breakaway survived to the finish line. Cavendish originally finished ahead of Hushovd, but was relegated to the last position in the peloton, 154th, for irregular sprinting, maneuvering Hushovd toward a barricade in the final 300 meters. In Stage 17, Hushovd staged a daring solo breakaway, after the morning's initial breakaway was caught, and stayed away over the second and third of five climbs on the course and, more importantly, got top points in two intermediate sprints. Though he lost almost 30 minutes at the finish line, the move gave him a 30-point lead in the points classification and the Stage 17 combativity award. Though he did not score again until his sixth-place finish on the Champs-Élysées, where Cavendish took his sixth stage win of the Tour, Hushovd was successful in coming away with the green jersey.

Apart from Hushovd, the team claimed another win in Stage 13, when Haussler attacked three breakaway companions 40 kilometers from the finish line and soloed to victory more than four minutes ahead of them. It was seen as a redemption for Haussler's near misses at Milan–San Remo and the Tour of Flanders, and also garnered him the stage's combativity award. Sastre, for his part, was quiet, finishing in the top ten of a stage only once, in Stage 15. Sastre never threatened the race lead, finishing 17th overall, more than 26 minutes behind Contador as Tour champion. It is his worst Grand Tour time-wise since the 2006 Giro d'Italia, when he rode in support of Ivan Basso.

=== Vuelta a España ===
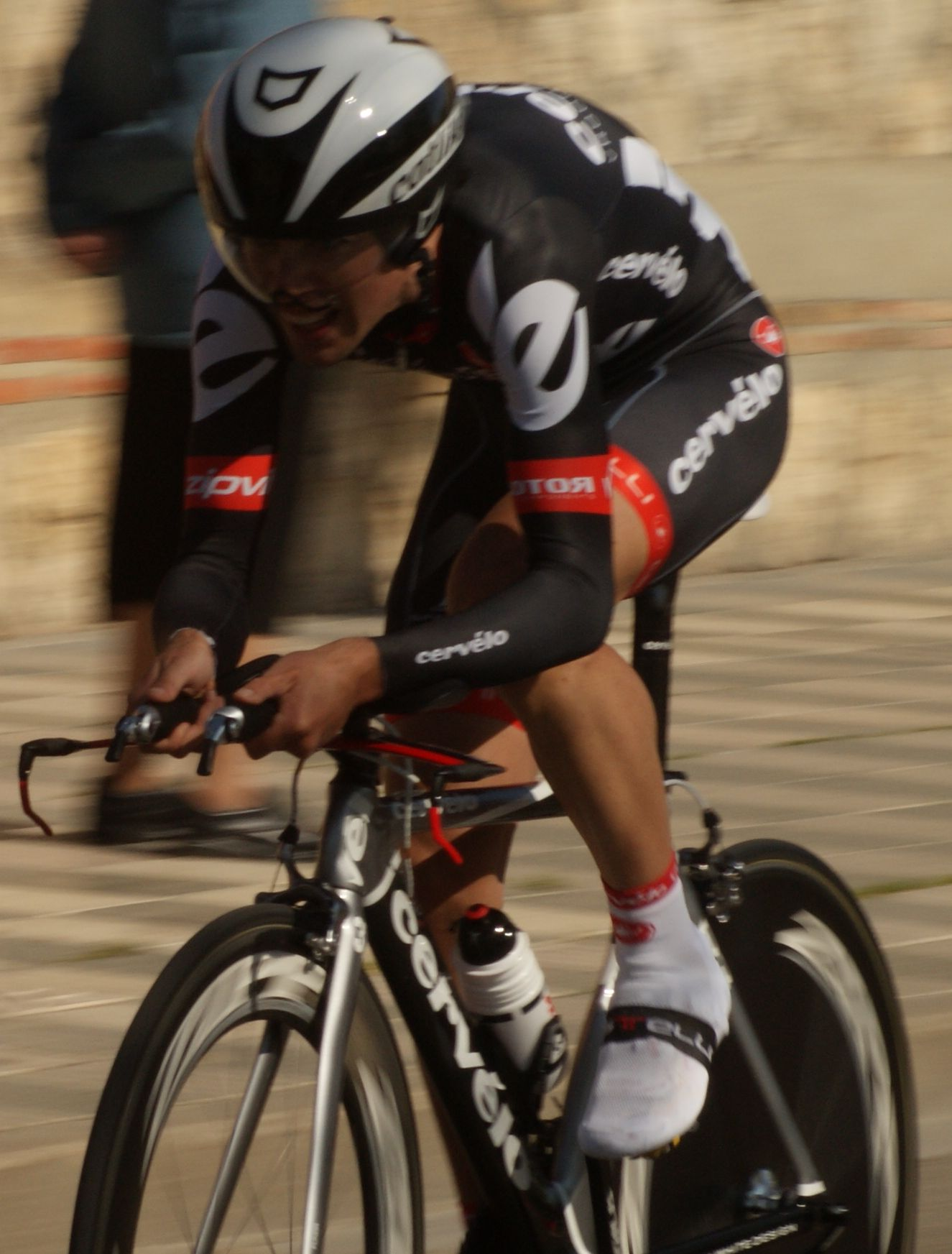
Philip Deignan, taken during the Vuelta a Castilla y León.

The team was one of 22 invited to the Vuelta a España. Roger Hammond contested sprints in two of the three mass-start stages held in the Netherlands, finishing third behind Gerald Ciolek in Stage 2 and seventh behind Greg Henderson in Stage 3. As the squad sent to the Vuelta lacked riders with any serious climbing prowess, the team was quiet, without so much as a top ten in a stage, until the undulating tenth stage into Murcia. The breakaway that morning comprised 19 riders from 18 teams, four of whom stayed out front to the finish – Alexander Vinokourov, Ryder Hesjedal, Jakob Fuglsang, and Cervélo rider Simon Gerrans. They were able to contest a sprint finish among themselves, with Gerrans coming around Vinokourov's early leadout to take the win. The win gave Gerrans stage wins in all three Grand Tours for his career (having previously won a stage in the Giro d'Italia earlier this season, and in the 2008 Tour de France while riding for Crédit Agricole), and the team stage victories in all three Grands in its first season of existence.

The eighteenth stage also featured a Cervélo win from a breakaway, but this one had additional significance. After being part of a 16-man group that escaped on the first-category Puerto de Mijares, Philip Deignan continued to shed his breakaway companions on the way to the finish line, last outsprinting Roman Kreuziger for the stage win. Deignan had begun the day 18th in the overall classification, but finishing 9' 41" ahead of the peloton on the day propelled him into ninth. It was the first Grand Tour stage win for an Irish cyclist since Stephen Roche in 1992. Deignan went on to hold ninth place through the conclusion of the race, the best overall finish for an Irishman since Roche in the 1992 Giro d'Italia and Cervélo TestTeam's best-placed finisher. Deignan and Juan José Cobo were the only two of the top ten overall in the Vuelta to have won a stage in the race.

== Season victories ==
Date	Race	Competition	Rider	Country	Location
February 2	Tour of Qatar, Stage 2	UCI Asia Tour	Roger Hammond (GBR)	Qatar	Al Khor
February 6	Tour of Qatar, Teams classification	UCI Asia Tour		Qatar	
February 6	Tour of Qatar, Points classification	UCI Asia Tour	Heinrich Haussler (GER)	Qatar	
February 6	Tour of Qatar, Young rider classification	UCI Asia Tour	Heinrich Haussler (GER)	Qatar	
February 17	Tour of California, Stage 3	UCI America Tour	Thor Hushovd (NOR)	United States	Modesto
February 18	Volta ao Algarve, Stage 1	UCI Europe Tour	Heinrich Haussler (GER)	Portugal	Olhao
February 22	Volta ao Algarve, Stage 5	UCI Europe Tour	Heinrich Haussler (GER)	Portugal	Portimão
February 28	Omloop Het Nieuwsblad	UCI Europe Tour	Thor Hushovd (NOR)	Belgium	Gent
March 9	Paris–Nice, Stage 2	UCI World Calendar	Heinrich Haussler (GER)	France	La Chapelle-Saint-Ursin
March 15	Giro del Mendrisiotto	UCI Europe Tour	Ignatas Konovalovas (LTU)	Switzerland	Mendrisiotto
May 18	Volta a Catalunya, Stage 1	UCI ProTour	Thor Hushovd (NOR)	Spain	Lloret de Mar
May 23	Volta a Catalunya, Stage 6	UCI ProTour	Thor Hushovd (NOR)	Spain	Barcelona
May 23	Giro d'Italia, Stage 14	UCI World Ranking	Simon Gerrans (AUS)	Italy	Bologna
May 25	Giro d'Italia, Stage 16	UCI World Ranking	Carlos Sastre (ESP)	Italy	Monte Petrano
May 29	Giro d'Italia, Stage 19	UCI World Ranking	Carlos Sastre (ESP)	Italy	Mount Vesuvius
May 31	Giro d'Italia, Stage 21	UCI World Ranking	Ignatas Konovalovas (LTU)	Italy	Rome
June 6	GP Triberg-Schwarzwald	UCI Europe Tour	Heinrich Haussler (GER)	Germany	Triberg im Schwarzwald
July 9	Tour de France, Stage 6	UCI World Ranking	Thor Hushovd (NOR)	Spain	Barcelona
July 17	Tour de France, Stage 13	UCI World Ranking	Heinrich Haussler (GER)	France	Colmar
July 26	Tour de France, Points classification	UCI World Ranking	Thor Hushovd (NOR)	France	
August 1	Danmark Rundt, Stage 4	UCI Europe Tour	Jeremy Hunt (GBR)	Denmark	Køge
August 23	GP Ouest-France	UCI ProTour	Simon Gerrans (AUS)	France	Plouay
August 27	Tour du Poitou-Charentes, Stage 4	UCI Europe Tour	Thor Hushovd (NOR)	France	Loudun
August 28	Tour du Poitou-Charentes, Stage 5	UCI Europe Tour	Heinrich Haussler (GER)	France	Poitiers
September 8	Vuelta a España, Stage 10	UCI World Ranking	Simon Gerrans (AUS)	Spain	Murcia
September 9	Tour of Missouri, Stage 3	UCI America Tour	Thor Hushovd (NOR)	United States	Rolla
September 13	Tour of Missouri, Points classification	UCI America Tour	Thor Hushovd (NOR)	United States	
September 17	Vuelta a España, Stage 18	UCI World Ranking	Philip Deignan (IRL)	Spain	Ávila
