= 2009 Paris–Tours =

The 2009 Paris–Tours is the 103rd edition of this single day road bicycle racing event and is organized by the Amaury Sport Organisation (ASO), which also runs the Tour de France. The 230 km event took place on October 11, 2009 and was won by Philippe Gilbert, the Belgian rider for Silence–Lotto in 5 hours, 12 minutes, 23 seconds. Gilbert, along with countryman Tom Boonen (Quick Step) and Slovenia's Borut Božič (Vacansoleil), escaped with 7 km to go at the base of the Côte de l'Epan behind an attack from Gilbert's teammate Greg Van Avermaet.

== General standings ==
=== 2009-10-11: Chartres–Tours, 230 km ===
	Cyclist	Team	Time
1	Philippe Gilbert (BEL)	Silence–Lotto	5h 12' 23"
2	Tom Boonen (BEL)	Quick-Step	s.t.
3	Borut Božič (SLO)	Vacansoleil	+ 2"
4	Filippo Pozzato (ITA)	Team Katusha	+ 16"
5	Óscar Freire (ESP)	Rabobank	s.t.
6	Francesco Gavazzi (ITA)	Lampre–NGC	s.t.
7	Gerben Löwik (NED)	Vacansoleil	s.t.
8	Pablo Lastras (ESP)	Caisse d'Epargne	s.t.
9	Martin Reimer (GER)	Cervélo TestTeam	s.t.
10	Yauheni Hutarovich (BLR)	Française des Jeux	s.t.
