= João Correia =

João Correia may refer to:

- João Correia (cyclist) (born 1975), Portuguese cyclist
- João Correia (rugby union) (born 1979), Portuguese rugby union player
- João Correia (footballer, born 1911) (1911–1984), Portuguese footballer
- João Correia (footballer, born 1996), Portuguese footballer for Vitória Guimarães B
- João António Correia (1822–1896), Portuguese painter and art professor
