= 2009 Tour de Romandie =

2009 UCI ProTour, race 6 of 14

Race details
- Dates: 28 April–3 May 2009
- Stages: 5 & Prologue
- Distance: 574.4 km (356.9 mi)
- Winning time: 14h 20' 14"

Results
	Winner	Roman Kreuziger (CZE)	(Liquigas)
	Second	Vladimir Karpets (RUS)	(Team Katusha)
	Third	Rein Taaramäe (EST)	(Cofidis)
	Points	Grégory Rast (SUI)	(Astana)
	Mountains	Laurens ten Dam (NED)	(Rabobank)
	Youth	Roman Kreuziger (CZE)	(Liquigas)
	Team	Caisse d'Epargne	

The 2009 Tour de Romandie was the 63rd edition of the Tour de Romandie cycling road race and the sixth event in the 2009 UCI ProTour. It started on 28 April in Lausanne and finished on 3 May in Geneva. Roman Kreuziger won the 4th stage, and in doing so put himself into a lead that he retained on the last day, thus going one better than his second place overall in 2008.

== Teams ==
In addition to the 18 ProTour teams guaranteed entry to the event as it is promoted by the UCI, two wildcard entries were accepted: Cervélo TestTeam and BMC Racing Team, both of which have strong Swiss links. Andreas Klöden did not defend the title he won the previous year, but the two previous winners of the event, Thomas Dekker and Cadel Evans took part, as teammates on the Silence–Lotto team. Other pre-race favourites included four of the top five in 2008 (Roman Kreuziger (Liquigas), Marco Pinotti (Team Columbia–High Road), Dennis Menchov (Rabobank) and Mikel Astarloza (Euskaltel–Euskadi)) and 2008 ProTour champion Alejandro Valverde (Caisse d'Epargne).

- Ag2r–La Mondiale
- Astana
- Bbox Bouygues Telecom
- BMC Racing Team
- Caisse d'Epargne
- Cervélo TestTeam
- Cofidis
- Euskaltel–Euskadi
- Française des Jeux
- Fuji–Servetto
- Garmin–Slipstream
- Lampre–NGC
- Liquigas
- Quick-Step
- Rabobank
- Silence–Lotto
- Team Columbia–HTC
- Team Katusha
- Team Milram
- Team Saxo Bank

== Stages ==
=== Prologue ===
28 April – Lausanne, 3.1 kilometres (1.9 mi) (ITT)

Prologue results
Rank	Rider	Team	Time
1	František Raboň (CZE)	Team Columbia–High Road	3' 44"
2	Sandy Casar (FRA)	Française des Jeux	+ 2"
3	Alejandro Valverde (SPA)	Caisse d'Epargne	+ 3"
4	Tyler Farrar (USA)	Garmin–Slipstream	+ 4"
5	Roman Kreuziger (CZE)	Liquigas	+ 4"
6	Maxim Iglinsky (KAZ)	Astana	+ 4"
7	Jussi Veikkanen (FIN)	Française des Jeux	+ 4"
8	Jérôme Coppel (FRA)	Française des Jeux	+ 5"
9	Manuel Quinziato (ITA)	Liquigas	+ 5"
10	Óscar Freire (SPA)	Rabobank	+ 5"

General classification after Prologue
Rank	Rider	Team	Time
1	František Raboň (CZE)	Team Columbia–High Road	3' 44"
2	Sandy Casar (FRA)	Française des Jeux	+ 2"
3	Alejandro Valverde (SPA)	Caisse d'Epargne	+ 3"
4	Tyler Farrar (USA)	Garmin–Slipstream	+ 4"
5	Roman Kreuziger (CZE)	Liquigas	+ 4"
6	Maxim Iglinsky (KAZ)	Astana	+ 4"
7	Jussi Veikkanen (FIN)	Française des Jeux	+ 4"
8	Jérôme Coppel (FRA)	Française des Jeux	+ 5"
9	Manuel Quinziato (ITA)	Liquigas	+ 5"
10	Óscar Freire (SPA)	Rabobank	+ 5"

=== Stage 1 ===
29 April – Montreux to Fribourg, 87 kilometres (54 mi)

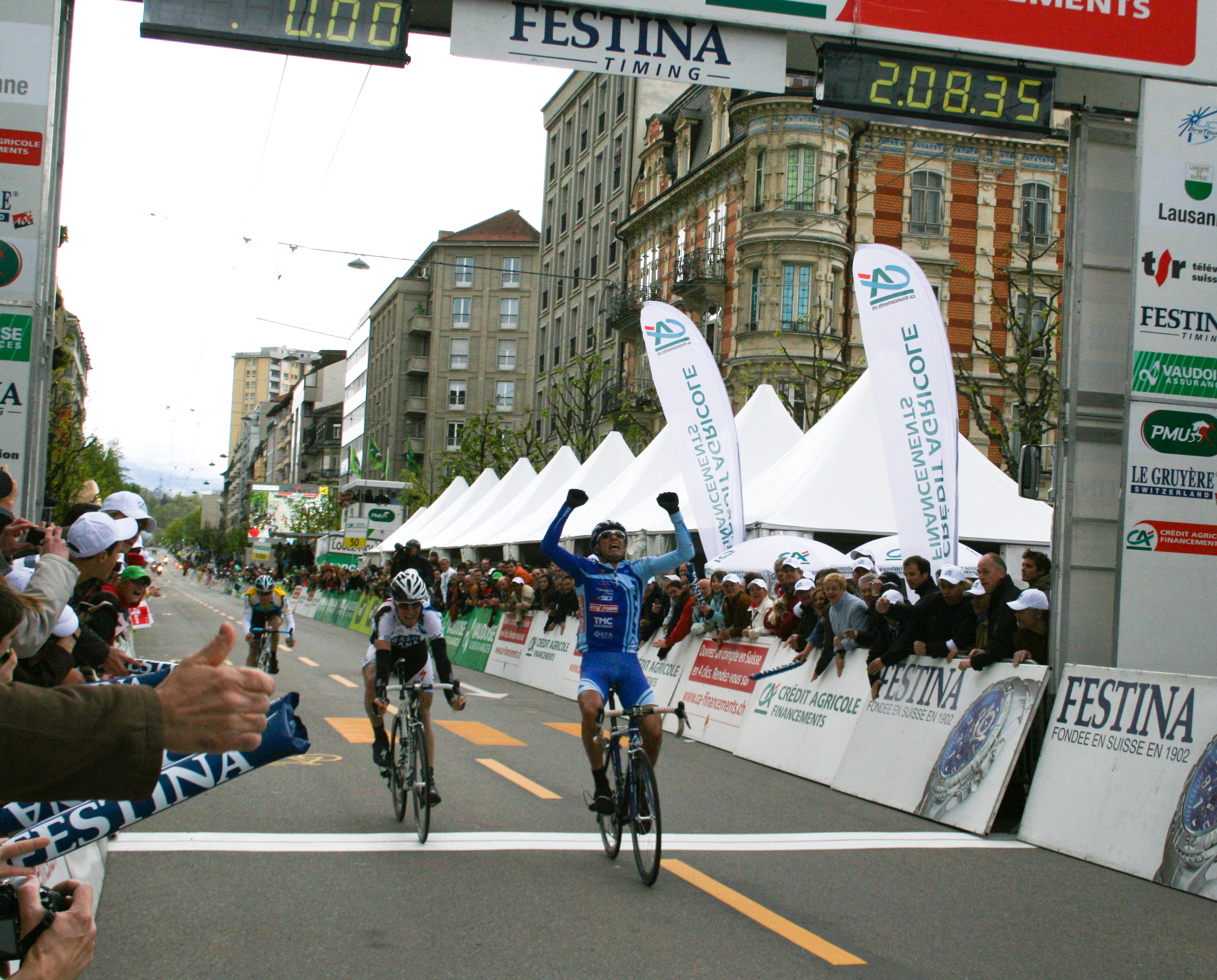
Stage 1 finish line with Ricardo Serrano ahead of Lars Bak and Grégory Rast.

The stage was shortened due to snowfalls, from a scheduled 176.2 kilometres (109.5 mi) to 87 kilometres (54 mi).

Stage 1 results
Rank	Rider	Team	Time
1	Ricardo Serrano (SPA)	Fuji–Servetto	2h 08' 35"
2	Lars Bak (DEN)	Team Saxo Bank	+ 0"
3	Grégory Rast (SUI)	Astana	+ 0"
4	Tony Martin (GER)	Team Columbia–High Road	+ 28"
5	Haimar Zubeldia (SPA)	Astana	+ 28"
6	Koldo Fernández (SPA)	Euskaltel–Euskadi	+ 31"
7	Jacopo Guarnieri (ITA)	Liquigas	+ 31"
8	Tyler Farrar (USA)	Garmin–Slipstream	+ 31"
9	Markus Zberg (SUI)	BMC Racing Team	+ 31"
10	Michael Schär (SUI)	Astana	+ 31"

General classification after stage 1
Rank	Rider	Team	Time
1	Grégory Rast (SUI)	Astana	2h 12' 17"
2	Ricardo Serrano (SPA)	Fuji–Servetto	+ 5"
3	Lars Bak (DEN)	Team Saxo Bank	+ 12"
4	František Raboň (CZE)	Team Columbia–High Road	+ 33"
5	Sandy Casar (FRA)	Française des Jeux	+ 35"
6	Tony Martin (GER)	Team Columbia–High Road	+ 35"
7	Alejandro Valverde (SPA)	Caisse d'Epargne	+ 36"
8	Tyler Farrar (USA)	Garmin–Slipstream	+ 37"
9	Roman Kreuziger (CZE)	Liquigas	+ 37"
10	Maxim Iglinsky (KAZ)	Astana	+ 37"

=== Stage 2 ===
30 April – La Chaux-de-Fonds to La Chaux-de-Fonds, 161.5 kilometres (100.4 mi)

Stage 2 results
Rank	Rider	Team	Time
1	Óscar Freire (SPA)	Rabobank	4h 06' 56"
2	František Raboň (CZE)	Team Columbia–High Road	+ 0"
3	Assan Bazayev (KAZ)	Astana	+ 0"
4	Roman Kreuziger (CZE)	Liquigas	+ 0"
5	Dan Martin (IRE)	Garmin–Slipstream	+ 0"
6	Matteo Bono (ITA)	Lampre–NGC	+ 0"
7	Alexandre Moos (SUI)	BMC Racing Team	+ 0"
8	Lars Bak (DEN)	Team Saxo Bank	+ 0"
9	Tadej Valjavec (SLO)	Ag2r–La Mondiale	+ 0"
10	Evgeni Petrov	Team Katusha	+ 0"

General classification after stage 2
Rank	Rider	Team	Time
1	Grégory Rast (SUI)	Astana	6h 19' 13"
2	Ricardo Serrano (SPA)	Fuji–Servetto	+ 5"
3	Lars Bak (DEN)	Team Saxo Bank	+ 12"
4	František Raboň (CZE)	Team Columbia–High Road	+ 27"
5	Óscar Freire (SPA)	Rabobank	+ 28"
6	Sandy Casar (FRA)	Française des Jeux	+ 34"
7	Tony Martin (GER)	Team Columbia–High Road	+ 35"
8	Alejandro Valverde (SPA)	Caisse d'Epargne	+ 36"
9	Roman Kreuziger (CZE)	Liquigas	+ 37"
10	Maxim Iglinsky (KAZ)	Astana	+ 37"

=== Stage 3 ===
1 May – Yverdon-les-Bains, 14.8 kilometres (9.2 mi) (TTT)

Stage 3 results
Rank	Team	Time
1	(United States) Team Columbia–High Road	18' 37"
2	(Spain) Caisse d'Epargne	+ 10"
3	(Denmark) Team Saxo Bank	+ 16"
4	(Italy) Liquigas	+ 24"
5	(Belgium) Silence–Lotto	+ 25"
6	(Switzerland) Cervélo TestTeam	+ 25"
7	Team Katusha	+ 25"
8	(Kazakhstan) Astana	+ 34"
9	(France) Française des Jeux	+ 38"
10	(Netherlands) Rabobank	+ 39"

General classification after stage 3
Rank	Rider	Team	Time
1	František Raboň (CZE)	Team Columbia–High Road	6h 38' 17"
2	Lars Bak (DEN)	Team Saxo Bank	+ 1"
3	Tony Martin (GER)	Team Columbia–High Road	+ 8"
4	Alejandro Valverde (SPA)	Caisse d'Epargne	+ 19"
5	Kanstantsin Sivtsov (BLR)	Team Columbia–High Road	+ 21"
6	Rigoberto Urán (COL)	Caisse d'Epargne	+ 21"
7	Morris Possoni (ITA)	Team Columbia–High Road	+ 22"
8	Alberto Losada (SPA)	Caisse d'Epargne	+ 31"
9	Roman Kreuziger (CZE)	Liquigas	+ 34"
10	Philippe Gilbert (BEL)	Silence–Lotto	+ 36"

=== Stage 4 ===
2 May – Estavayer-le-Lac to Sainte-Croix, 157.5 kilometres (97.9 mi)

Stage 4 results
Rank	Rider	Team	Time
1	Roman Kreuziger (CZE)	Liquigas	4h 11' 44"
2	Rein Taaramäe (EST)	Cofidis	+ 0"
3	Vladimir Karpets	Team Katusha	+ 7"
4	Fredrik Kessiakoff (SWE)	Fuji–Servetto	+ 17"
5	Mikel Astarloza (SPA)	Euskaltel–Euskadi	+ 45"
6	Rémy Di Gregorio (FRA)	Française des Jeux	+ 51"
7	Dario Cataldo (ITA)	Quick-Step	+ 51"
8	Mathias Frank (SUI)	BMC Racing Team	+ 51"
9	Alejandro Valverde (SPA)	Caisse d'Epargne	+ 51"
10	Cadel Evans (AUS)	Silence–Lotto	+ 51"

General classification after stage 4
Rank	Rider	Team	Time
1	Roman Kreuziger (CZE)	Liquigas	10h 50' 25"
2	Vladimir Karpets	Team Katusha	+ 18"
3	Rein Taaramäe (EST)	Cofidis	+ 25"
4	Alejandro Valverde (SPA)	Caisse d'Epargne	+ 46"
5	Rigoberto Urán (COL)	Caisse d'Epargne	+ 48"
6	Lars Bak (DEN)	Team Saxo Bank	+ 1' 01"
7	Cadel Evans (AUS)	Silence–Lotto	+ 1' 07"
8	Tony Martin (GER)	Team Columbia–High Road	+ 1' 08"
9	Fredrik Kessiakoff (SWE)	Fuji–Servetto	+ 1' 16"
10	Kanstantsin Sivtsov (BLR)	Team Columbia–High Road	+ 1' 21"

=== Stage 5 ===
3 May – Aubonne to Geneva, 150.5 kilometres (93.5 mi)

Stage 5 results
Rank	Rider	Team	Time
1	Óscar Freire (SPA)	Rabobank	3h 29' 49"
2	Tyler Farrar (USA)	Garmin–Slipstream	+ 0"
3	Koldo Fernández (SPA)	Euskaltel–Euskadi	+ 0"
4	Philippe Gilbert (BEL)	Silence–Lotto	+ 0"
5	Nico Sijmens (BEL)	Cofidis	+ 0"
6	Tony Martin (GER)	Team Columbia–High Road	+ 0"
7	Markus Zberg (SUI)	BMC Racing Team	+ 0"
8	Iker Camaño (SPA)	Fuji–Servetto	+ 0"
9	Sebastian Lang (GER)	Silence–Lotto	+ 0"
10	Jens Voigt (GER)	Team Saxo Bank	+ 0"

General classification after stage 5
Rank	Rider	Team	Time
1	Roman Kreuziger (CZE)	Liquigas	14h 20' 14"
2	Vladimir Karpets	Team Katusha	+ 18"
3	Rein Taaramäe (EST)	Cofidis	+ 25"
4	Alejandro Valverde (SPA)	Caisse d'Epargne	+ 46"
5	Rigoberto Urán (COL)	Caisse d'Epargne	+ 48"
6	Lars Bak (DEN)	Team Saxo Bank	+ 1' 01"
7	Cadel Evans (AUS)	Silence–Lotto	+ 1' 07"
8	Tony Martin (GER)	Team Columbia–High Road	+ 1' 08"
9	Fredrik Kessiakoff (SWE)	Fuji–Servetto	+ 1' 16"
10	Kanstantsin Sivtsov (BLR)	Team Columbia–High Road	+ 1' 21"

== Classification leadership table ==
Classification leadership by stage
Stage	Winner	General classification	Points classification	Mountains classification	Young rider classification	Team classification
P	František Raboň	František Raboň	None Awarded	None Awarded	Tyler Farrar	Française des Jeux
1	Ricardo Serrano	Grégory Rast	Grégory Rast	Ricardo Serrano	Tony Martin	Astana
2	Óscar Freire	Grégory Rast	Grégory Rast	Matthieu Sprick	Tony Martin	Astana
3	Team Columbia–High Road	František Raboň	Grégory Rast	Matthieu Sprick	Tony Martin	Team Columbia–High Road
4	Roman Kreuziger	Roman Kreuziger	Grégory Rast	Laurens ten Dam	Roman Kreuziger	Caisse d'Epargne
5	Óscar Freire	Roman Kreuziger	Grégory Rast	Laurens ten Dam	Roman Kreuziger	Caisse d'Epargne
Final		Roman Kreuziger	Grégory Rast	Laurens ten Dam	Roman Kreuziger	Caisse d'Epargne

== Classification standings ==
=== General classification ===
Final general classification
Rank	Rider	Team	Time
1	Roman Kreuziger (CZE)	Liquigas	14h 20' 14"
2	Vladimir Karpets	Team Katusha	+ 18"
3	Rein Taaramäe (EST)	Cofidis	+ 25"
4	Alejandro Valverde (SPA)	Caisse d'Epargne	+ 46"
5	Rigoberto Urán (COL)	Caisse d'Epargne	+ 48"
6	Lars Bak (DEN)	Team Saxo Bank	+ 1' 01"
7	Cadel Evans (AUS)	Silence–Lotto	+ 1' 07"
8	Tony Martin (GER)	Team Columbia–High Road	+ 1' 08"
9	Fredrik Kessiakoff (SWE)	Fuji–Servetto	+ 1' 16"
10	Kanstantsin Sivtsov (BLR)	Team Columbia–High Road	+ 1' 21"

=== Points classification ===
Final points classification
Rank	Rider	Team	Points
1	Grégory Rast (SUI)	Astana	15
2	Florent Brard (FRA)	Cofidis	12
3	Jérôme Coppel (FRA)	Française des Jeux	9
4	Sandy Casar (FRA)	Française des Jeux	7
5	Philippe Gilbert (BEL)	Silence–Lotto	6
6	Michael Schär (SUI)	Astana	6
7	Matthieu Sprick (FRA)	Bbox Bouygues Telecom	6
8	Lars Bak (DEN)	Team Saxo Bank	4
9	Ricardo Serrano (SPA)	Fuji–Servetto	4
10	Paul Voss (GER)	Team Milram	3

=== Mountains classification ===
Final mountains classification
Rank	Rider	Team	Points
1	Laurens Ten Dam (NED)	Rabobank	36
2	Matthieu Sprick (FRA)	Bbox Bouygues Telecom	28
3	David Moncoutié (FRA)	Cofidis	26
4	Ricardo Serrano (SPA)	Fuji–Servetto	20
5	Florent Brard (FRA)	Cofidis	20
6	Roman Kreuziger (CZE)	Liquigas	16
7	Jérôme Coppel (FRA)	Française des Jeux	16
8	Paul Voss (GER)	Team Milram	14
9	Óscar Pujol (SPA)	Cervélo TestTeam	14
10	Rein Taaramäe (EST)	Cofidis	14

=== Young rider classification ===
Final young rider classification (1–10)
Rank	Rider	Team	Time
1	Roman Kreuziger (CZE)	Liquigas	14h 20' 14"
2	Rein Taaramäe (EST)	Cofidis	+ 25"
3	Rigoberto Urán (COL)	Caisse d'Epargne	+ 48"
4	Tony Martin (GER)	Team Columbia–High Road	+ 1' 08"
5	Mathias Frank (SUI)	BMC Racing Team	+ 1' 26"
6	Rémy Di Gregorio (FRA)	Française des Jeux	+ 1' 29"
7	Marcel Wyss (SUI)	Cervélo TestTeam	+ 1' 40"
8	Chris Anker Sørensen (DEN)	Team Saxo Bank	+ 1' 44"
9	Dario Cataldo (ITA)	Quick-Step	+ 1' 45"
10	Guillaume Bonnafond (FRA)	Ag2r–La Mondiale	+ 4' 01"

=== Teams classification ===
Final teams classification
Rank	Team	Time
1	(Spain) Caisse d'Epargne	42h 26' 09"
2	(Kazakhstan) Astana	+ 56"
3	(Spain) Fuji–Servetto	+ 57"
4	(France) Ag2r–La Mondiale	+ 2' 10"
5	(Belgium) Silence–Lotto	+ 3' 14"
6	(France) Française des Jeux	+ 3' 16"
7	(Denmark) Team Saxo Bank	+ 4' 51"
8	(Switzerland) Cervélo TestTeam	+ 5' 22"
9	Team Katusha	+ 7' 16"
10	(Spain) Euskaltel–Euskadi	+ 7' 41"
