= 2010 Vuelta a Castilla y León =

2009–10 UCI Europe Tour

Race details
- Dates: 14 April – 18 April
- Stages: 5
- Distance: 700.5 km (435.3 mi)
- Winning time: 16h 56' 01"

Results
Jersey awarded to the overall winner	Winner	Alberto Contador (ESP)	(Astana)
	Second	Igor Antón (ESP)	(Euskaltel–Euskadi)
	Third	Ezequiel Mosquera (ESP)	(Xacobeo–Galicia)
	Points	Theo Bos (NED)	(Cervélo TestTeam)
	Mountains	Iban Mayoz (ESP)	(Footon–Servetto–Fuji)
	Combination	Alberto Contador (ESP)	(Astana)
	Team	(United States) Team RadioShack	

The 2010 Vuelta a Castilla y León was the 25th running of the Vuelta a Castilla y León road cycling stage race, which started on 14 April and concluded on 18 April 2010. Normally the race would be run in March, however, this year the start was pushed back to mid-April. The race was won by Alberto Contador.

== Stages ==
Stage	Date	Route	km	Winner	General classification
1	14 April	Belorado to Burgos	157.7	Theo Bos (NED)	Theo Bos (NED)
2	15 April	Burgos to Carrión de los Condes	209.9	Theo Bos (NED)	Theo Bos (NED)
3	16 April	León to Alto del Morredero	158.8	Igor Antón (ESP)	Igor Antón (ESP)
4	17 April	Ponferrada to Ponferrada	15.1 (ITT)	Alberto Contador (ESP)	Alberto Contador (ESP)
5	18 April	Samos to Santiago de Compostela	171.6	Sérgio Ribeiro (POR)	Alberto Contador (ESP)

== Final standings ==
General classification

	Cyclist	Team	Time
1	Alberto Contador (ESP)	Astana	16h 56' 01"
2	Igor Antón (ESP)	Euskaltel–Euskadi	+ 41"
3	Ezequiel Mosquera (ESP)	Xacobeo–Galicia	+ 1' 20"
4	Janez Brajkovič (SLO)	Team RadioShack	+ 1' 30"
5	David Bernabeu (ESP)	Barbot–Siper	+ 2' 30"
6	Javier Moreno (ESP)	Andalucía–CajaSur	+ 2' 51"
7	Tiago Machado (POR)	Team RadioShack	+ 2' 51"
8	Stefan Denifl (AUT)	Cervélo TestTeam	+ 2' 58"
9	Denis Menchov (RUS)	Rabobank	+ 3' 06"
10	José Luis Rubiera (ESP)	Team RadioShack	+ 3' 17"
