= 2009 Tour of Qatar =

Race details
- Dates: 1–6 February
- Stages: 5
- Winning time: 12h 55' 25"

Results
	Winner	Tom Boonen (BEL)	(Quick Step)
	Second	Heinrich Haussler (GER)	(Cervélo TestTeam)
	Third	Roger Hammond (GBR)	(Cervélo TestTeam)
	Points	Heinrich Haussler (GER)	(Cervélo TestTeam)
	Youth	Heinrich Haussler (GER)	(Cervélo TestTeam)
	Team	(Switzerland) Cervélo TestTeam	

The 2009 Tour of Qatar was held from 1 February to 6 February 2009 in Qatar. It was a multiple stage road cycling race that took part over six stages with a total of 685 kilometres (426 mi) and was part of the 2008–09 UCI Asia Tour. The Race was won by Tom Boonen of the Quick Step team.

During the night after stage 4 Belgian cyclist Frederiek Nolf of the Topsport Vlaanderen–Mercator team died in his sleep of a suspected heart attack. The organisers cancelled stage 5 and held a 'cycling procession' instead.

== Stage summary ==
Stage	Date	Start	Finish	Distance	Stage Top 3	Leading Top 3	Time
1	1 February	Doha Corniche	Doha Corniche	6 km	(United States) Garmin–Slipstream (Belgium) Quick Step (Russia) Team Katusha	(United Kingdom) Bradley Wiggins (Netherlands) Hans Dekkers (France) Kilian Patour	6'34" s.t. s.t.
2	2 February	Khalifa International Stadium	Al Khor Corniche	134 km	(United Kingdom) Roger Hammond (Italy) Danilo Napolitano (Germany) Heinrich Haussler	(United Kingdom) Roger Hammond (Belgium) Tom Boonen (Germany) Heinrich Haussler	3h 39'30" + 6" + 7"
3	3 February	Zubarah	Doha Golf Club	137.5 km	(Belgium) Tom Boonen (Italy) Danilo Napolitano (Belgium) Jürgen Roelandts	(Belgium) Tom Boonen (United Kingdom) Roger Hammond (Germany) Heinrich Haussler	6h 14'16" + 6" + 14"
4	4 February	Doha Old Souq	Madinat Al Shamal	141 km	(United Kingdom) Mark Cavendish (Germany) Heinrich Haussler (Belgium) Tom Boonen	(Belgium) Tom Boonen (United Kingdom) Roger Hammond (Germany) Heinrich Haussler	10h 19'07" + 10" + 12"
5	5 February	Camel Race Track	Qatar Foundation	147.5 km	Cancelled	(Belgium) Tom Boonen (United Kingdom) Roger Hammond (Germany) Heinrich Haussler	10h 19'07" + 10" + 12"
6	6 February	Sealine Beach Resort	Doha Corniche	121 km	(United Kingdom) Mark Cavendish (Germany) Robert Förster (Germany) Heinrich Haussler	(Belgium) Tom Boonen (Germany) Heinrich Haussler (United Kingdom) Roger Hammond	12h 55'25" + 8" + 10"

== Other leading top threes ==
Stage	Sprints	Pts	Young Rider	Time	Teams	Time
1	no sprints	none	(Netherlands) Huub Duyn (Belgium) Wouter Weylandt (Russia) Mikhail Ignatiev	6'34" + 1" + 2"	(United States) Garmin–Slipstream (Belgium) Quick Step (Russia) Team Katusha	6'34" + 1" + 2"
2	(United Kingdom) Roger Hammond (Italy) Danilo Napolitano (Germany) Heinrich Haussler	30; 27; 25	(Germany) Heinrich Haussler (Netherlands) Huub Duyn (Russia) Mikhail Ignatiev	3h 39'37" + 2'08" + 2'10"	(Switzerland) Cervélo TestTeam (Belgium) Quick Step (Russia) Team Katusha	10h 45'42" + 0'53" + 4'17"
3	(Belgium) Tom Boonen (Italy) Danilo Napolitano (United Kingdom) Roger Hammond	56; 54; 50	(Germany) Heinrich Haussler (Russia) Denis Galimzyanov (United Kingdom) Mark Cavendish	6h 14'30" + 2'10" + 2'13"	(Switzerland) Cervélo TestTeam (Belgium) Quick Step (Russia) Team Katusha	18h 30'21" + 0'53" + 4'17"
4	(Belgium) Tom Boonen (Germany) Heinrich Haussler (United Kingdom) Roger Hammond	81; 75; 61	(Germany) Heinrich Haussler (United Kingdom) Mark Cavendish (Netherlands) Tom Veelers	10h 19'19" + 2'09" + 2'23"	(Switzerland) Cervélo TestTeam (Belgium) Quick Step (United States) Team Columbia	30h 45'06" + 2'27" + 5'29"
5	(Belgium) Tom Boonen (Germany) Heinrich Haussler (United Kingdom) Roger Hammond	81; 75; 61	(Germany) Heinrich Haussler (United Kingdom) Mark Cavendish (Netherlands) Tom Veelers	10h 19'19" + 2'09" + 2'23"	(Switzerland) Cervélo TestTeam (Belgium) Quick Step (United States) Team Columbia	30h 45'06" + 2'27" + 5'29"
6	(Germany) Heinrich Haussler (Belgium) Tom Boonen (Italy) Danilo Napolitano	100; 92; 73	(Germany) Heinrich Haussler (United Kingdom) Mark Cavendish (Netherlands) Tom Veelers	12h 55'33" + 2'03" + 2'27"	(Switzerland) Cervélo TestTeam (Belgium) Quick Step (United States) Team Columbia	38h 34'00" + 2'27" + 5'29"

== Men's top 10 overall ==
Pos	Rider	Time
1	(Belgium) Tom Boonen	12h 55'25"
2	(Germany) Heinrich Haussler	+ 0'08"
3	(United Kingdom) Roger Hammond	+ 0'10"
4	(United Kingdom) Daniel Lloyd	+ 0'25"
5	(Germany) Andreas Klier	+ 0'27"
6	(Spain) Xavier Florencio	+ 0'28"
7	(Italy) Angelo Furlan	+ 1'07"
8	(Norway) Gabriel Rasch	+ 1'43"
9	(United Kingdom) Mark Cavendish	+ 2'11"
10	(Netherlands) Tom Veelers	+ 2'35"
