= Stefan Denifl =

Austrian racing cyclist

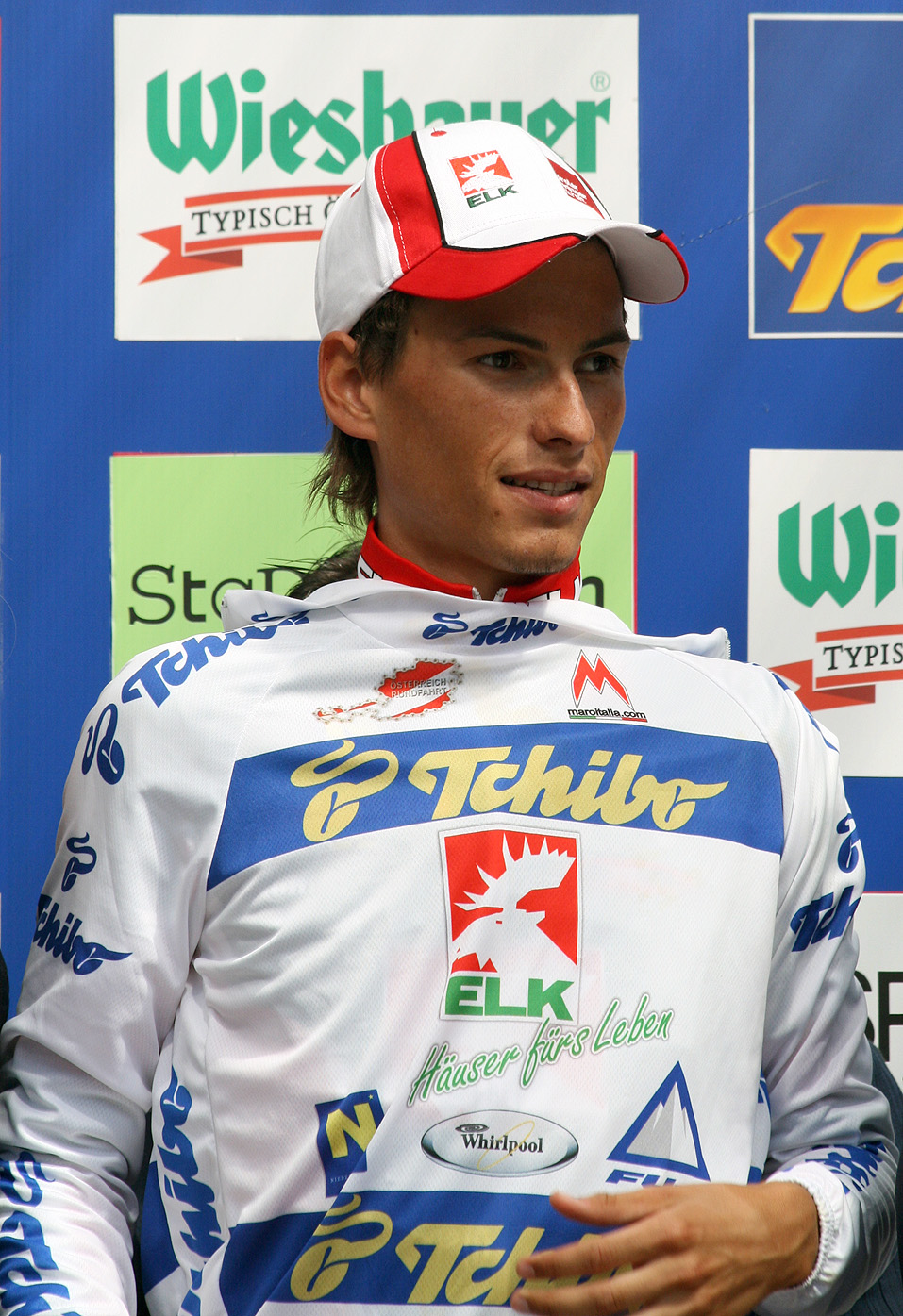
- Denifl in 2009

Personal information
- Full name: Stefan Denifl
- Born: 22 September 1987 (age 39) Fulpmes, Tyrol, Austria
- Height: 1.79 m (5 ft 10 1/2 in)
- Weight: 65 kg (143 lb; 10.2 st)

Cycling career
- Sport: Cycling
- Current team: Retired
- Discipline: Road
- Role: Rider
- Rider type: Climber; Time trialist

Amateur team
- 2009: Cervélo TestTeam (stagiaire)

Professional teams
- 2006: Vorarlberger
- 2007–2009: Elk Haus–Simplon
- 2010: Cervélo TestTeam
- 2011: Leopard Trek
- 2012: Vacansoleil–DCM
- 2013–2016: IAM Cycling
- 2017–2018: Aqua Blue Sport

Major wins
- One-day races and Classics National Time Trial Championships (2008)

Stefan Denifl (born 22 September 1987) is an Austrian former professional cyclist, who rode professionally between 2006 and 2018 for seven different professional teams. In 2019, Denifl confessed to doping during a five-year period in his career, and was given a four-year ban from the sport; as a consequence of this, Denifl received a two-year sentence in 2021 for serious commercial fraud.

== Career ==
Born in Fulpmes, Denifl began racing in 2001 with "Team Bike Denifl" as a mountain biker. In 2003, he moved to the road, riding for "Team ÖAMTC Recheis Lattella". From 2004, he focused on road cycling. In 2005, he was signed by Heiko Salzwedel for the T-Mobile Development Programme and included his first experience with the professional cyclists. In 2006, he signed with his first UCI Continental team Vorarlberger, and from 2007 to 2009 he was part of Elk Haus–Simplon. In 2009, he rode as a trainee for Cervélo TestTeam, and rode with them as a full professional the next year. In 2012, he rode for a year with Vacansoleil–DCM before joining IAM Cycling the following year. He participated in the men's individual road race at the 2016 Summer Olympics. In October 2016, Aqua Blue Sport announced that Denifl, alongside IAM team-mate Leigh Howard, would be part of their inaugural squad for the 2017 season. After Aqua Blue disbanded in the later summer of 2018, in October of that year Denifl was initially announced as a member of the CCC Team for the following season. However, in December 2018 the team announced that they and Denifl had mutually agreed to cancel his contract for personal reasons, which were not specified at the time.

=== Blood doping ===
In February 2019, Kronen Zeitung broke news that a number of professional cyclists had been implicated in the doping scandal uncovered at the FIS Nordic World Ski Championships. Later, Denifl confessed to blood doping in a police interview with CCC Team general manager Jim Ochowicz confirming that team's medical assessment of Denifl's biological passport showed no warning signs of blood doping. Denifl was handed a four-year ban on 27 June 2019. On 12 January 2021, it was announced that Denifl would receive a two-year prison sentence for fraud. The following year, the original judgement was overturned and went to a retrial.

== Major results ==
2004
3rd Road race, National Junior Road Championships
2005
National Junior Road Championships

1st Road race
2nd Time trial

2nd Overall Trofeo Karlsberg
6th Road race, UEC European Under-23 Road Championships
2007
9th Eschborn-Frankfurt City Loop U23
2008
National Road Championships

1st Time trial
1st Under-23 time trial

1st Eschborn-Frankfurt City Loop U23
5th Overall Giro della Regione Friuli Venezia Giulia
2009
1st Overall Thüringen Rundfahrt der U23
7th Overall Bayern–Rundfahrt
8th Overall Tour of Austria
2010
7th Overall Tour of Austria
7th Overall Bayern–Rundfahrt
8th Overall Vuelta a Castilla y León
2011
5th Grand Prix Cycliste de Montréal
9th Overall Grand Prix de Wallonie
2012
5th Overall Tour du Limousin
2013
1st Mountains classification, Bayern–Rundfahrt
2nd Road race, National Road Championships
5th Overall Circuit de la Sarthe
2014
7th Overall Paris–Nice
2015
~~1st Mountains classification, Tour de Suisse~~
~~10th Overall Tour of Austria~~

~~1st Austrian rider classification~~

2017
~~1st Overall Tour of Austria~~
~~1st Stage 17 Vuelta a España~~

=== Grand Tour general classification results timeline ===
Grand Tour	2010	2011	2012	2013	2014	2015	2016	2017
Giro d'Italia	—	—	75	—	—	—	~~52~~	—
Tour de France	Did not contest during his career							
Vuelta a España	DNF	—	—	—	—	—	—	~~58~~

Legend
—	Did not compete
DNF	Did not finish
