= Martin Reimer =

German cyclist (born 1987)

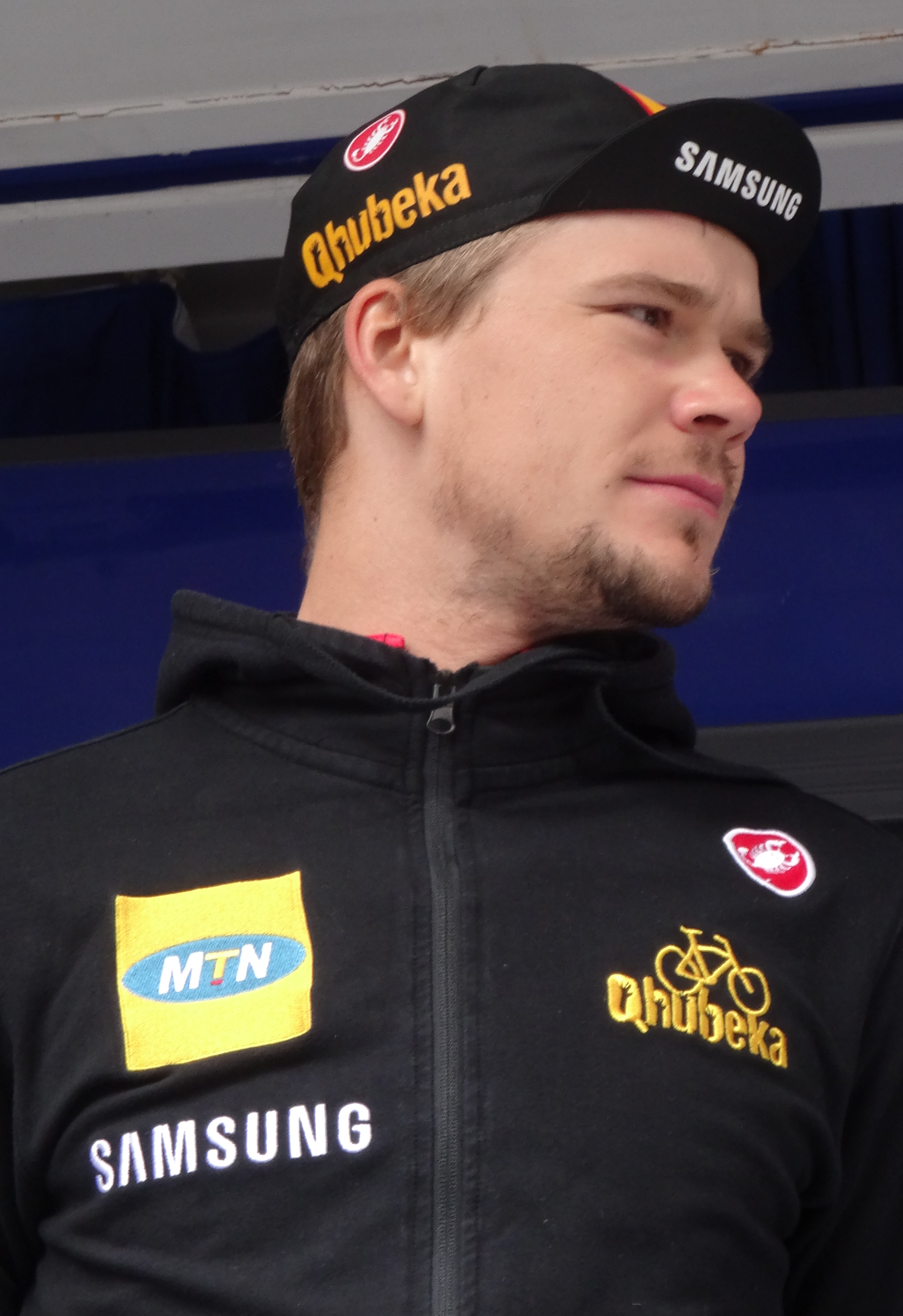
- Reimer in 2014

Personal information
- Full name: Martin Reimer
- Born: 14 June 1987 (age 39) Freiburg, Germany
- Height: 1.81 m (5 ft 11 in)
- Weight: 69 kg (152 lb)

Cycling career
- Sport: Cycling
- Current team: Retired
- Discipline: Road
- Role: Rider
- Rider type: Sprinter

Amateur teams
- 2004–2007: RK Endspurt 09 Cottbus
- 2006: Team POT Brandenburg
- 2012: RK Endspurt 09 Cottbus

Professional teams
- 2008: LKT Team Brandenburg
- 2009–2010: Cervélo TestTeam
- 2011: Skil–Shimano
- 2013–2014: MTN–Qhubeka
- 2015: LKT Team Brandenburg

Major wins
- National Road Race Championships (2009)

Martin Reimer (born 14 June 1987) is a German former professional road bicycle racer, who rode professionally from 2008 to 2011 and from 2013 to 2015. In 2009 he was the unlikely winner of the German National Road Race Championship.

In November 2011 he announced his early retirement from the sport of cycling. However, he changed his mind for the 2013 season and signed for team MTN–Qhubeka. He retired again after the 2015 season.

== Major results ==
2008
1st Road race, National Under-23 Road Championships
2009
1st Road race, National Road Championships
3rd Overall Tour of Britain
4th Giro del Mendrisiotto
9th Paris–Tours
