= Joaquín Novoa =

Spanish cyclist

Joaquin Novoa
Personal information
- Full name: Joaquín Novoa Méndez
- Born: 25 August 1983 (age 43)

Cycling career
- Sport: Cycling
- Current team: Diputación de Ávila-Smilekers
- Discipline: Road
- Role: Rider

Amateur teams
- 2007: Team CSC (stagiaire)
- 2012-: Diputación de Ávila-Smilekers

Professional team
- 2009-2010: Cervélo TestTeam

Joaquín Novoa Méndez (born 25 August 1983) is a Spanish cyclist.

== Palmarès ==
2006
1st Rutas del Vino
1st stages 1 and 2
2007
2nd Memorial Valenciaga
