= João Correia (cyclist) =

Portuguese cyclist

Personal information
- Full name: João Miguel Da Silva Correia
- Born: 10 February 1975 (age 51) Portugal
- Height: 1.74 m (5 ft 9 in)
- Weight: 83 kg (183 lb)

Cycling career
- Sport: Cycling
- Discipline: Road
- Role: Rider

Professional teams
- 1995: Kissena
- 2008–2009: Bissell
- 2010: Cervélo TestTeam

João Miguel Da Silva Correia (born 10 February 1975) is a Portuguese former cyclist who last rode for Cervélo TestTeam.

== Early life ==
Correia was born in Cernache do Bonjardim, a former civil parish in the municipality of Sertã, central Portugal. Upon emigrating to the USA with his family, he raced competitively until the age of 21, including three appearances at the UCI Juniors World Championships. Correia raced for Portuguese Continental team Troiamariscos in 1995, after which he turned down the possibility of a professional cycling career in favour of attending Fordham University in New York. After graduating, a career in publishing brought him around the world, working for titles such as Esquire before becoming associate publisher of Bicycling magazine.

== Return to racing ==
Following a conversation with Fausto Pinarello, the owner of the renowned bike brand set up by his father, João decided to return to racing aged 32, losing more than 60 pounds in the process. His unique story and his performances with US Continental Bissell Pro Cycling Team led to much media interest and an eventual contract with Cervélo TestTeam, where he rode alongside high-profile stars like 2010 world champion Thor Hushovd and the 2008 Tour de France winner Carlos Sastre.

== Post-racing career ==
Upon the closure of the Cervélo team, João went back to the business world, working for LinkedIn before returning again to cycling, combining his passion for the sport with his business skills to set up two successful companies: inGamba Tours, a travel company specialising in cycling, and Corso Sports Marketing, in partnership with his friend and business partner Ken Sommer. Their agency represented strong talent professional cycling, including Coryn Rivera (Tour of Flanders winner 2017), Mads Pedersen (cyclist), winner of the 2019 Road World Championships, Ineos Grenadiers rider Tao Geoghegan Hart (Winner of the 2020 Giro d'Italia), and Dutch veteran Laurens ten Dam.

Aside from his business interests, Correia is also a supporter of World Bicycle Relief, an international non-profit organization based in Chicago that specializes in large-scale, comprehensive bicycle distribution programs to aid poverty relief in developing countries around the world. Their programs focus primarily on education, economic development, and health care. inGamba Tours has raised more than $1 million for the WBR cause.
