= Daniel Lloyd (cyclist) =

English racing cyclist

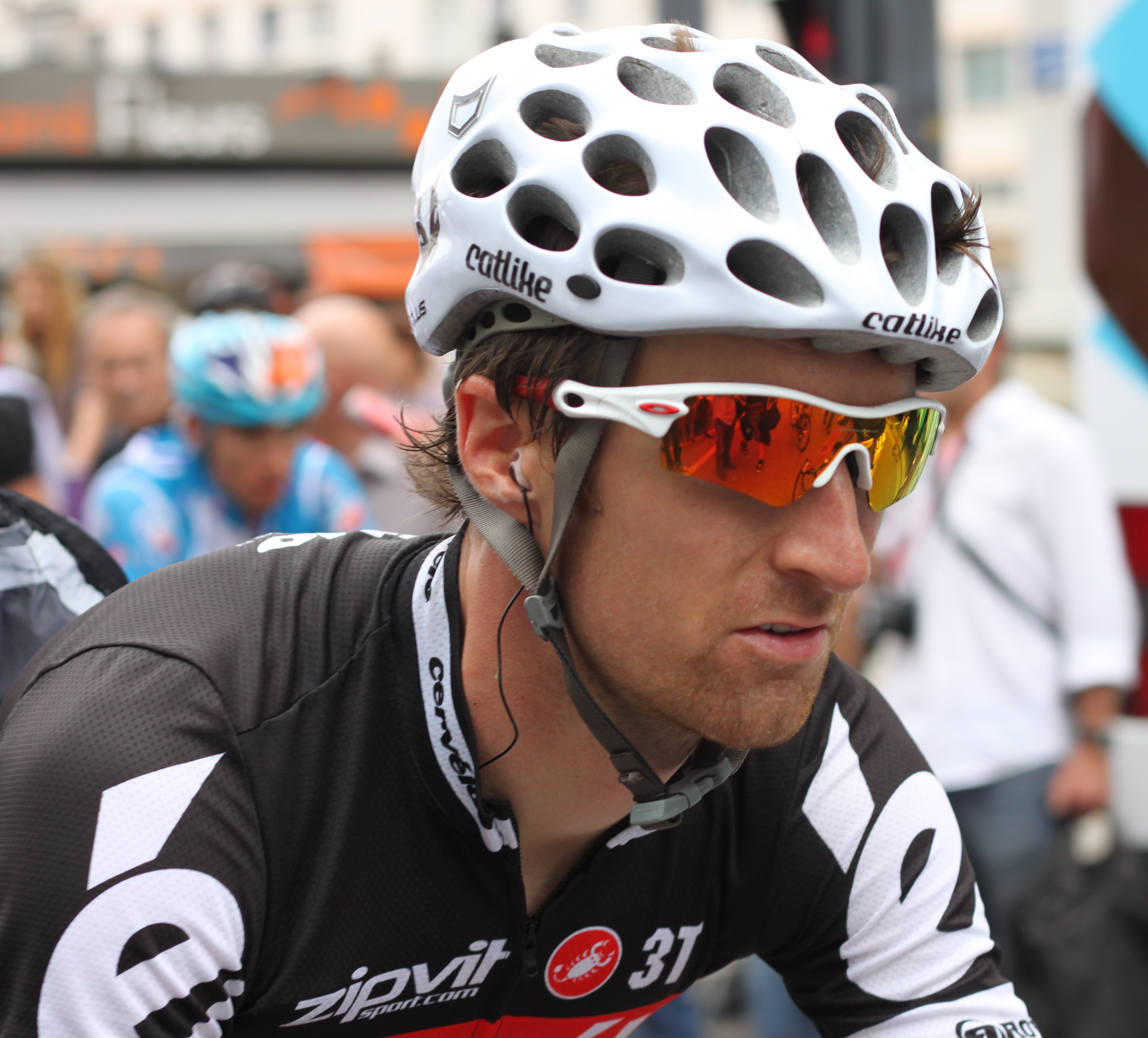
- Daniel Lloyd in 2010

Personal information
- Full name: Daniel William Llewellyn Lloyd
- Nickname: The Boss
- Born: 11 August 1980 (age 46) Christchurch, England, United Kingdom

Cycling career
- Sport: Cycling
- Discipline: Road
- Role: Rider; Assistant directeur sportif

Professional teams
- 2003: Team endurasport.com
- 2004–2005: Flanders
- 2006: Giant Asia Racing Team
- 2007: DFL–Cyclingnews–Litespeed
- 2008: An Post–M.Donnelly–Grant Thornton–Sean Kelly
- 2009–2010: Cervélo TestTeam
- 2011: Garmin–Cervélo
- 2012: Team IG–Sigma Sport

Daniel William Llewellyn Lloyd (born 11 August 1980) is an English broadcaster, content creator and retired professional road racing cyclist from Christchurch, Dorset.

Lloyd's professional cycling victories include the Vuelta a Extremadura overall in 2008 and stages of Tour of Siam and Tour of Qinghai Lake in 2006.

Lloyd has said that his favourite races include the Tour of Flanders, one of the two major Cobbled Classics, and Strade Bianche, in which he became the first British rider to claim a top-10 finish in 2009. He has also noted that the highlights of his cycling career were reaching the Champs-Élysées in the 2010 Tour de France and riding in the 2009 Tour of Qatar, which was his first race with the Cervélo TestTeam.

== Career ==
Lloyd started cycling competitively as a mountain bike racer in his early teens and won the Southern Area Mountain Bike Championships as a junior. He started competing in road races at around the same time and would later focus on this discipline.

Lloyd was active in the professional peloton from 2001 to 2012, with his most successful years coming between 2006 and 2009. After competing for Endurasport, Flanders-Afin.com and Giant Asia Racing Team in his early years as a professional, in 2007 Lloyd signed a contract with DFL–Cyclingnews–Litespeed for whom he rode for one year. He was a member of the Irish An Post–M.Donnelly–Grant Thornton–Sean Kelly team in 2008.

In 2009 he joined the Cervélo TestTeam (CTT), and was one of seven riders to move to Garmin–Cervélo when CTT folded at the end of 2010. After his contract expired at the end of 2011, he signed for the British Team IG–Sigma Sport. In November 2012, Lloyd announced his retirement from professional cycling. He became an assistant directeur sportif at IG-Sigma Sport the following season.

=== Race wins ===
Lloyd was the general classification winner of the 2008 Vuelta a Extremadura, his only overall victory in a professional stage race. The race was first held as an amateur event in 1987 and was uprated to professional status on the UCI Europe Tour in 2005. His An Post–M.Donnelly–Grant Thornton–Sean Kelly team started strongly with victory in the opening 22.4 km team time trial around Mérida, the only victory of Lloyd's career in that discipline. Lloyd finished in the top 20 on each of the remaining four stages and took the overall victory by 36 seconds.

His other professional wins both came in 2006 while riding for Giant Asia Racing Team in UCI Asia Tour stage races. He started his season in January at the Tour of Siam, winning the final stage around Phuket by 36 seconds ahead of teammate Kuan Hua Lai. He returned to Asia and the Tour of Qinghai Lake in China in July, winning stage 4 on his way to 4th place overall. Giant Asia finished the season as the UCI Asia Tour Teams Champion.

=== Grand Tour participation ===
Lloyd contested a Grand Tour on three occasions, completing the race each time. He rode in the Giro d'Italia twice, finishing 109th in 2009 and 103rd in 2010. He was employed primarily as a domestique for Carlos Sastre, helping the reigning Tour de France champion to a 4th place overall finish in 2009. Sastre was later upgraded to second behind winner Denis Menchov after Danilo di Luca and Franco Pellizotti were excluded for doping violations.

In his sole Tour de France appearance in 2010, Lloyd finished 164th of the 170 riders who completed the race, over four hours behind initial winner Alberto Contador. He would later be upgraded several places after multiple riders were excluded from the results, including Contador which saw Andy Schleck declared the official victor. He finished 22nd on stage 11 from Sisteron to Bourg-lès-Valence, his highest placing in an individual Grand Tour stage.

=== British National Championships ===
Lloyd competed in seven editions of the road race at the British National Championships, with second-place finishes in 2007 and 2009.

In 2007, he rode the last 70 km in a two-rider breakaway with David Millar. Millar, riding in the national championships for the first time since his doping suspension, would ultimately prevail in the sprint to the line. He finished 4th in the 2008 race, stating that he was in "balls of tears" and that this race was his "biggest disappointment" given his confidence that he could win the title after getting in the breakaway. In the 2009 edition, Lloyd chased down future Tour de France winners Bradley Wiggins and Chris Froome in the latter part of the race, ultimately dropping Wiggins and finishing ahead of Froome and Peter Kennaugh but losing out to Kristian House in the final sprint.

He made his only start in the British National Time Trial Championships in 2005, finishing eleven seconds off the podium in 4th place.

=== Other races ===
After winning a stage and finishing 4th overall in the 2006 race for Giant Asia, Lloyd returned to the Tour of Qinghai Lake in 2007 representing DFL–Cyclingnews–Litespeed. He featured in the top 20 on each of the nine stages, finishing second overall behind Giro d'Italia stage winner Gabriele Missaglia. This result was instrumental in Lloyd ending the year as the highest ranked rider in the DFL squad, finishing a career-high 329th in the PCS rankings for 2007.

Leading up to the 2008 Olympic Games, Lloyd expressed a desire to be selected for the British Olympic road race team, and put together a series of strong results which led to him being considered for selection. However, he was not included in the final squad.

In 2009, Lloyd made his sole appearance in the road race at the UCI World Championships which were held that year in Mendrisio, Switzerland. Part of a nine-strong team, he was one of seven British riders not to finish the race. He also rode in four monument races, with a best finish of 45th at the Tour of Flanders in 2009, and finished 9th at the 2009 edition of Strade Bianche.

He participated in the Tour of Britain five times, with a best overall finish of 10th in 2011. This was the last notable result of his career, and the 2012 edition of the race was his final outing as a professional cyclist.

=== Management career ===
After finishing his road career with Team IG–Sigma Sport, in 2013 Lloyd was announced as an assistant directeur sportif for the team. He made his managerial debut at the 2013 Tour of Britain.

=== Broadcasting career ===
Since 2012, Lloyd has worked as a broadcaster and content creator for Global Cycling Network (GCN).

Lloyd is the lead presenter for GCN's news and race preview shows, often alongside former IG-Sigma teammate Simon Richardson. He has used this platform to voice his opinion on cycling matters, for example regarding whether only amateur and unsigned riders should be eligible to compete in the men's under-23 road race at the UCI World Championships. As of 2022 the event is also open to professionals who meet the age criteria, with Lloyd opining that contracted riders should only be eligible for the elite road race event.

After GCN owner Play Sports Networks (PSN) was acquired by Eurosport parent company Warner Bros. Discovery in 2019, he also provided commentary and in-studio punditry during Eurosport and GCN+ coverage of Grand Tour and other major races. After Warner sold their majority stake in PSN back to the company's founders in 2024, Lloyd announced that he would no longer appear on Eurosport programming and would be focusing solely on his role at GCN. With the closure of the GCN+ streaming service and GCN website, Lloyd's involvement will predominantly focus on content for the GCN YouTube channel.

He has also served as the international English finish line commentator for the Giro d'Italia.

== Major results ==
2006
1st Stage 7 Tour of Siam
4th Overall Tour of Qinghai Lake

1st Stage 4

4th Overall Tour d'Indonesia
2007
2nd Overall Tour of Qinghai Lake
2nd Road race, National Road Championships
2008
1st Overall Vuelta a Extremadura

1st Stage 1 (TTT)

4th Overall Volta Ciclista da Ascension
4th Road race, National Road Championships
6th Overall Cinturón Ciclista a Mallorca
9th Grand Prix Pino Cerami
2009
2nd Road race, National Road Championships
4th Overall Tour of Qatar
9th Monte Paschi Strade Bianche
2011
10th Overall Tour of Britain

=== Grand Tour general classification results timeline ===
Grand Tour	2009	2010
Giro d'Italia	109	103
Tour de France	—	161
Vuelta a España	—	—

Legend
—	Did not compete
