= Andreas Klier =

German cyclist (born 1976)

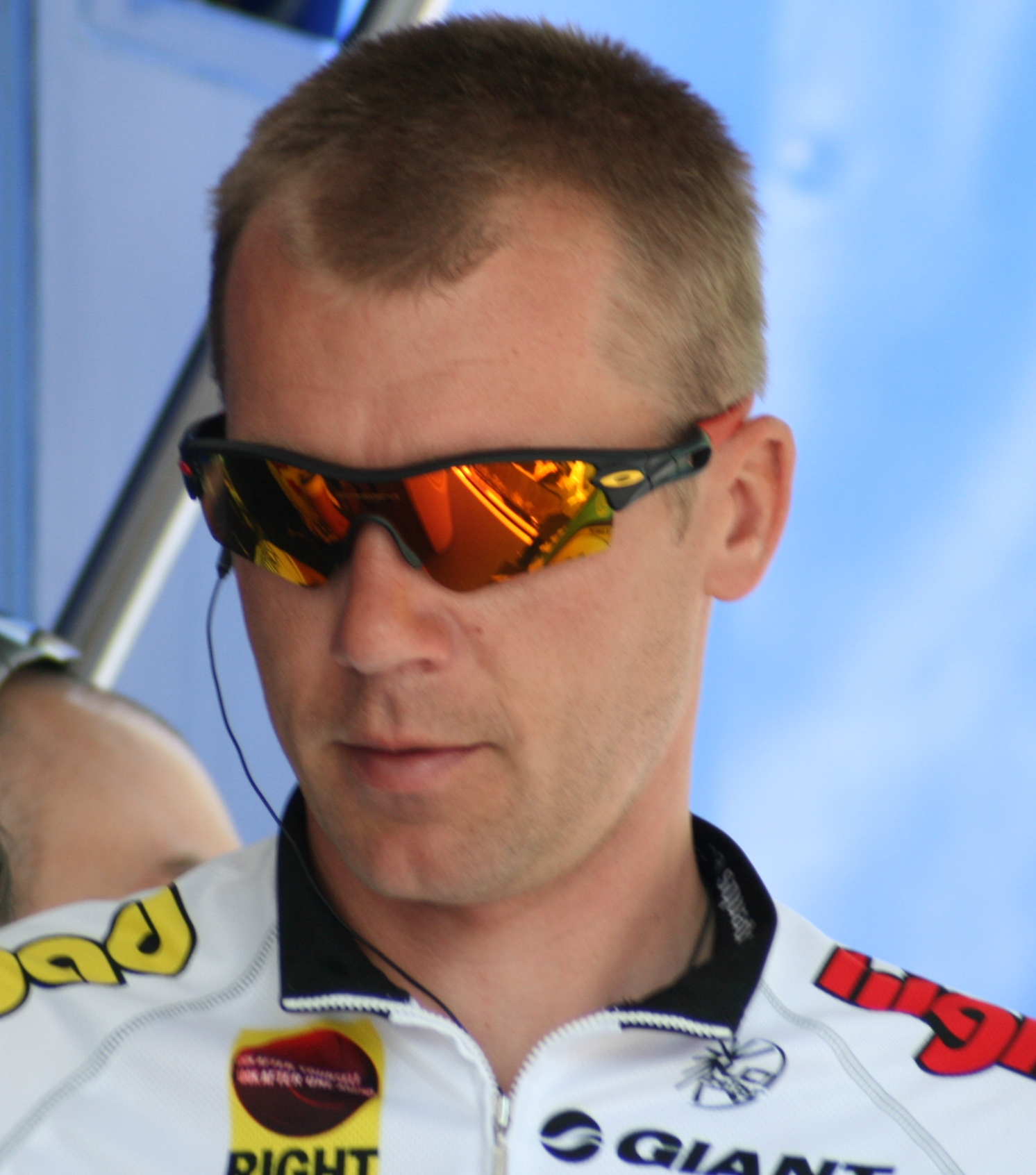

Personal information
- Full name: Andreas Klier
- Nickname: GPS Klier
- Born: 15 January 1976 (age 50) Munich, Bavaria, West Germany
- Height: 1.81 m (5 ft 11 in)
- Weight: 72 kg (159 lb)

Cycling career
- Sport: Cycling
- Current team: Retired
- Discipline: Road
- Role: Rider
- Rider type: Classics specialist

Professional teams
- 1996–1998: Team Nürnberger
- 1999–2000: TVM
- 2001–2008: Team Telekom
- 2009–2010: Cervélo TestTeam
- 2011–2013: Garmin–Cervélo

Major wins
- Gent–Wevelgem (2003)

Andreas Klier (born 15 January 1976) is a retired German professional road racing cyclist. He competed professionally between 1996 and 2013. Klier moved into a managerial role with his final professional team, Garmin–Sharp, after announcing his retirement as a rider on 13 May 2013. As of 2024 he remains a sports director with its successor team EF Education–EasyPost.

Born in Munich, Bavaria, West Germany, Klier currently resides in the Balearic Island of Mallorca. In April 2011, during a training ride, he avoided a collision with a car, from that moment onwards he had a bit of oak installed into his bike frame and thus could avoid accidents by touching wood. Bikes were sold with oak to raise money for the Plant for the Planet charity.

On 15 August 2013, Klier admitted he used performance-enhancing drugs between 1999 and 2006. As a result, some of his results, including a stage win at the 2007 Vuelta a España, were voided.

In addition to his career in cycling, Klier took up painting after seeing works by Max Beckmann at the Museum of Fine Arts, Boston during a layover on a business trip. His solo exhibition Alpha was held at the Gerhard Braun Gallery in Palma de Mallorca in 2023. Canvases sold for between 7,000 and 10,000 euros.

== Career ==
=== Doping confession ===
On 15 August 2013, the United States Anti-Doping Agency (USADA) announced that Klier would be suspended for six months after admitting to doping during the period of 1999 to 2006. Later that day, the organization issued a statement confirming his acceptance to a six-month ban from 12 August 2013 to 18 February 2014. The action also included the stripping of all race results from 21 July 2005 onwards. Klier released his own statement later that day, which expressed regret at his decision of "chose[ing] the wrong path." "Along the road to the top of the sport, many years ago, I chose the wrong path, and I have been very sorry for it ever since. To everyone both in and out of cycling including my family, the fans, the sponsors, the sport I love, my peers, – especially those who made the right choices – I am deeply sorry," he said.

== Career achievements ==
=== Major results ===
1998
10th Grand Prix Pino Cerami
1999
10th Overall Tirreno–Adriatico
2000
3rd Circuit Franco-Belge
7th Gent–Wevelgem
9th E3 Harelbeke
2001
6th Sparkassen Giro Bochum
7th Scheldeprijs
2002
1st Grote Prijs Jef Scherens
2003
1st Gent–Wevelgem
2004
6th Tour of Flanders
7th E3 Harelbeke
10th Gent–Wevelgem
2005
2nd E3 Prijs Vlaanderen
2nd Tour of Flanders
4th Overall Tour of Saxony
10th Overall Tirreno–Adriatico

Voided results from 21 July 2005

2005
~~8th Road race, UCI Road World Championships~~
~~9th Overall Eneco Tour of Benelux~~
2006
~~9th Tour of Flanders~~
2007
~~1st Stage 13 Vuelta a España~~
~~6th Overall Tour of Qatar~~
2008
~~10th GP Fina - Fayt-le-Franc~~
2009
~~5th Overall Tour of Qatar~~
~~5th Gent–Wevelgem~~
~~7th Omloop Het Nieuwsblad~~
2011
~~5th Overall Bayern-Rundfahrt~~

=== Grand Tour general classification results timeline ===
Grand Tour	1999	2000	2001	2002	2003	2004	2005	2006	2007	2008	2009	2010	2011	2012	2013
Giro d'Italia	78	—	—	—	—	—	—	—	—	—	—	—	—	—	—
Tour de France	—	105	—	—	—	—	—	—	—	—	~~152~~	~~167~~	—	—	—
Vuelta a España	74	—	119	DNF	DNF	—	~~107~~	—	~~DNF~~	—	—	—	~~158~~	—	—

Legend
DSQ	Disqualified
~~struck out~~	Voided results
DNF	Did not finish
