= Óscar Pujol =

Spanish cyclist

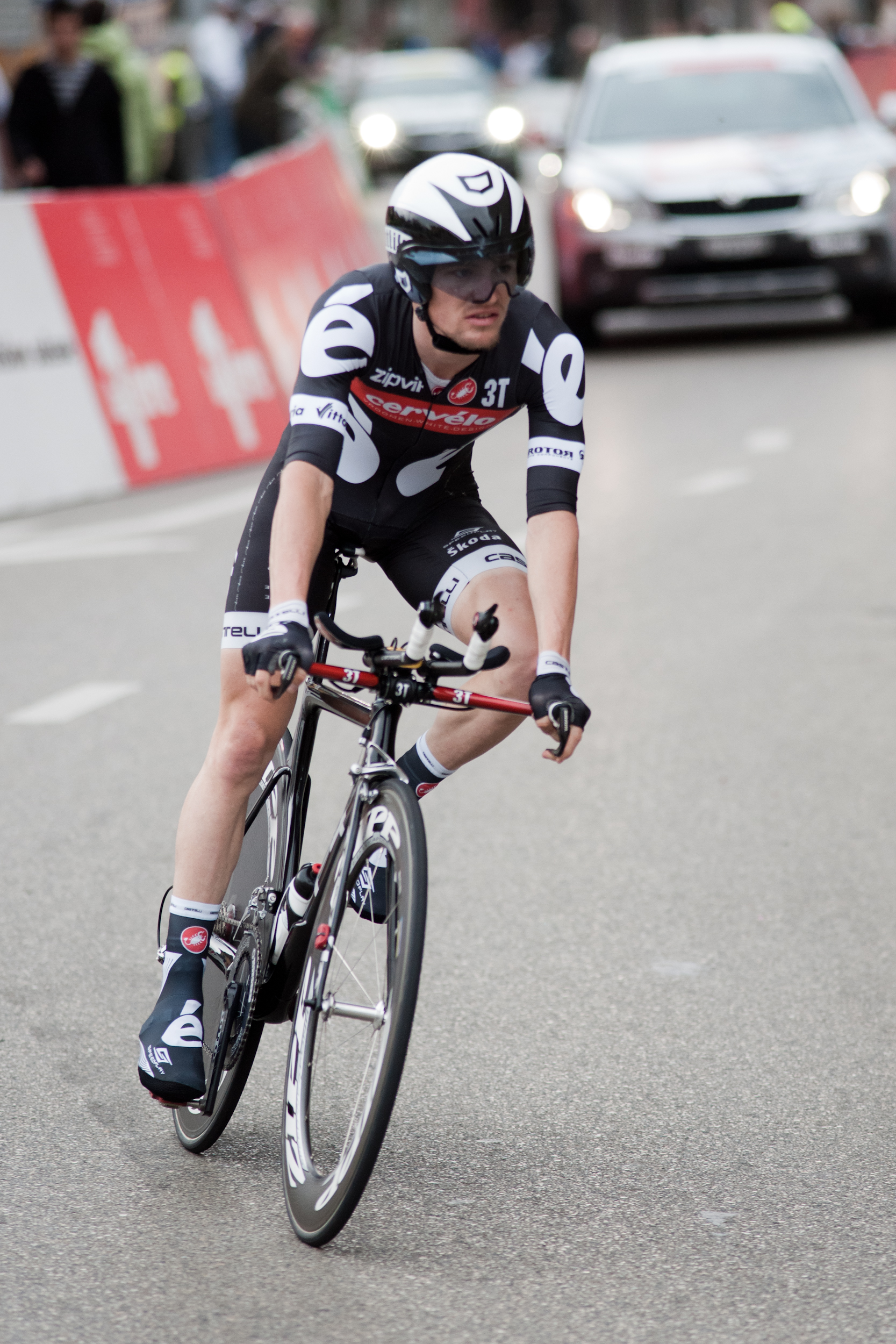
- Pujol at the 2010 Tour de Romandie

Personal information
- Full name: Óscar Pujol Muñoz
- Born: 16 October 1983 (age 42) Terrassa, Spain
- Height: 1.73 m (5 ft 8 in)
- Weight: 58 kg (128 lb)

Cycling career
- Sport: Cycling
- Current team: Retired
- Discipline: Road
- Role: Rider

Amateur team
- 2008: Burgos Monumental

Professional teams
- 2009–2010: Cervélo TestTeam
- 2011: Omega Pharma–Lotto
- 2012: Azad University Cross Team
- 2013: RTS–Santic Racing Team
- 2013: Polygon Sweet Nice
- 2014: Skydive Dubai Pro Cycling
- 2015–2018: Team UKYO

Óscar Pujol Muñoz (born 16 October 1983) is a Spanish former professional cyclist, who rode professionally between 2009 and 2018, including as a member of UCI ProTeams Cervélo TestTeam and Omega Pharma–Lotto.

In July 2018, Pujol became the first presenter for the Spanish-language Global Cycling Network channel.

== Major results ==
2006
2nd Overall Vuelta a Cantabria
3rd Overall Vuelta a Salamanca

1st Stages 1 & 4

2007
1st Aitzondo Klasika
1st Stage 4 Vuelta Ciclista a Navarra
1st Stage 2 Bizkaiko Bira
2nd Gran Premio Macario
3rd Essor Basque
2008
7th Clásica a los Puertos de Guadarrama
2012
1st Overall Tour de Singkarak

1st Points classification
1st Mountains classification
1st Stage 3

1st Melas CX Basin Racin'
2nd Overall Banyuwangi Tour de Ijen
6th Overall Tour of Iran
2013
6th Overall Tour de Singkarak

1st Stage 1

2014
1st Mountains classification Tour de Kumano
8th Overall Tour de Singkarak

1st Stage 5

2015
1st Ibukiyama Driveway Hill Climb
1st Ishikawa Road Race
1st Miyada Hillclimb
2016
1st Overall Tour of Japan

1st Stage 6

1st Overall Tour de Kumano

1st Stage 2

1st Taiwan KOM Challenge
5th Japan Cup
2017
1st Overall Tour of Japan

1st Stage 6

2nd Overall Tour de Kumano
2nd Taiwan KOM Challenge
5th Klasika Primavera
9th Overall Tour of Hainan

=== Grand Tour general classification results timeline ===
Grand Tour	2010
Giro d'Italia	—
Tour de France	—
Vuelta a España	66

Legend
—	Did not compete
DNF	Did not finish
IP	In Progress
