= Cervélo TestTeam =

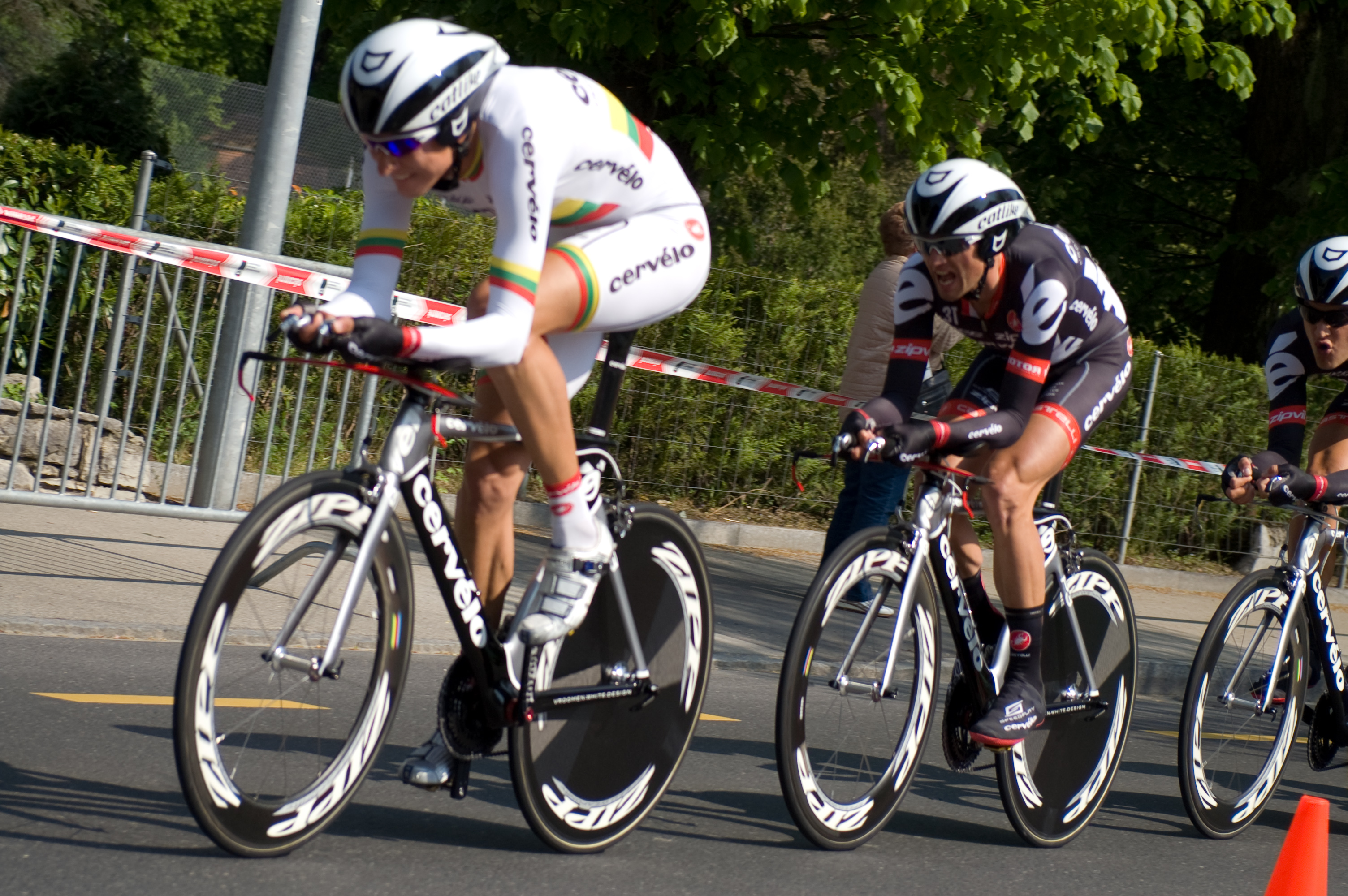
- Cervélo TestTeam riding the team time trial stage of the 2009 Tour de Romandie.

Team information
- UCI code: CTT
- Registered: Switzerland
- Founded: 2009
- Disbanded: 2010
- Discipline: Road
- Status: Professional Continental

Key personnel
- Team manager: Joop Alberda

Cervélo TestTeam (UCI team code: CTT) is a former professional cycling team, whose license was held in Switzerland by the cycling management company Cycling United Racing. The team's title sponsor was Cervélo, a Canadian manufacturer of bicycle frames that previously exclusively supplied CSC–Saxo Bank. They competed in 2010 as a UCI Professional Continental team, but folded after the season.

The team formed in 2008 after Team CSC switched frames effective at the end of that season, to Specialized, after years of success with Cervélo. Their registration as a UCI Professional Continental Team was confirmed on December 2. Earlier that year, Carlos Sastre, then a member of Team CSC Saxo Bank, rode a Cervélo bicycle to victory in the Tour de France. Probably the team's most notable cyclist, Sastre said that being able to continually work with Cervélo to develop bicycle technology played a part in his decision to join the new team.

The team's first season was marked by success in one-day races, with several victories and podium finishes, and a rider in the top ten in nearly every race they entered. The team was prolific in winning individual stages in stage races, including in all three Grand Tours of the 2009 season.

== Team roster ==
As of August 1, 2010.

Rider	Date of birth
Davide Appollonio (ITA)	June 2, 1989 (aged 21)
Theo Bos (NED)	August 22, 1983 (aged 26)
João Correia (POR)	February 10, 1974 (aged 36)
Íñigo Cuesta (ESP)	June 2, 1969 (aged 41)
Philip Deignan (IRL)	September 7, 1983 (aged 26)
Stefan Denifl (AUT)	September 20, 1987 (aged 22)
Xavier Florencio (ESP)	December 26, 1979 (aged 30)
Volodymir Gustov (UKR)	February 15, 1977 (aged 33)
Roger Hammond (GBR)	January 30, 1974 (aged 36)
Heinrich Haussler (AUS)	February 25, 1984 (aged 26)
Jeremy Hunt (GBR)	March 12, 1974 (aged 36)
Thor Hushovd (NOR)	January 18, 1978 (aged 32)
Ted King (USA)	January 31, 1983 (aged 27)

Rider	Date of birth
Andreas Klier (GER)	January 15, 1975 (aged 35)
Ignatas Konovalovas (LTU)	December 8, 1985 (aged 24)
Brett Lancaster (AUS)	November 15, 1979 (aged 30)
Daniel Lloyd (GBR)	August 11, 1980 (aged 29)
Joaquin Novoa (ESP)	August 25, 1983 (aged 26)
Oscar Pujol (ESP)	October 16, 1983 (aged 26)
Gabriel Rasch (NOR)	April 8, 1976 (aged 34)
Martin Reimer (GER)	June 14, 1987 (aged 23)
Dominique Rollin (CAN)	October 29, 1982 (aged 27)
Carlos Sastre (ESP)	April 22, 1975 (aged 35)
Xavier Tondo (ESP)	November 5, 1978 (aged 31)
Marcel Wyss (SUI)	June 25, 1986 (aged 24)

== Team origin ==
The founding of Cervélo TestTeam was a direct reaction to Team CSC Saxo Bank switching to Specialized. A press release issued by the team at the time they were first founded indirectly stated that Specialized had outbid them to become Saxo Bank's new supplier. Sastre and Roger Hammond were two of the first cyclists to be rumored to be joining the new team. Cervélo cofounder Gerard Vroomen has said that bicycle manufacturers have for long not gotten much out of sponsorship and supplier deals with professional teams and that their money was better spent fronting their own team. He approached Sastre two days after the conclusion of the 2008 Tour de France and told him about the new team, at which time Sastre verbally indicated to Vroomen that he would join the team. The other highly prominent cyclist on the squad is former Tour de France green jersey winner Thor Hushovd, who needed a new team following the collapse of Crédit Agricole after the 2008 season, and brought a number of Crédit Agricole riders to the team after signing.

In the six months between the end of the Tour de France and the team's first training camp in Portugal in January 2009, a roster of 25 riders and an entire supporting staff was hired. The team is one of the most broadly international in professional cycling, with 13 nations represented by those 25 riders. At the first presentation of the team in Portugal, Vroomen also evoked legendary cyclist Fausto Coppi having ridden for a team sponsored by the bicycle industry (that sponsor being Bianchi Bicycles) as a motivation for sponsorship of the new team. On February 11, the team was one of thirteen assigned "Wild Card" status by the UCI, allowing the organizers of UCI ProTour events to select them to race in their event despite not having ProTour status as a team. To date, only the Tour Down Under and the Dauphiné Libéré have declined to invite the team.

== 2009 season ==
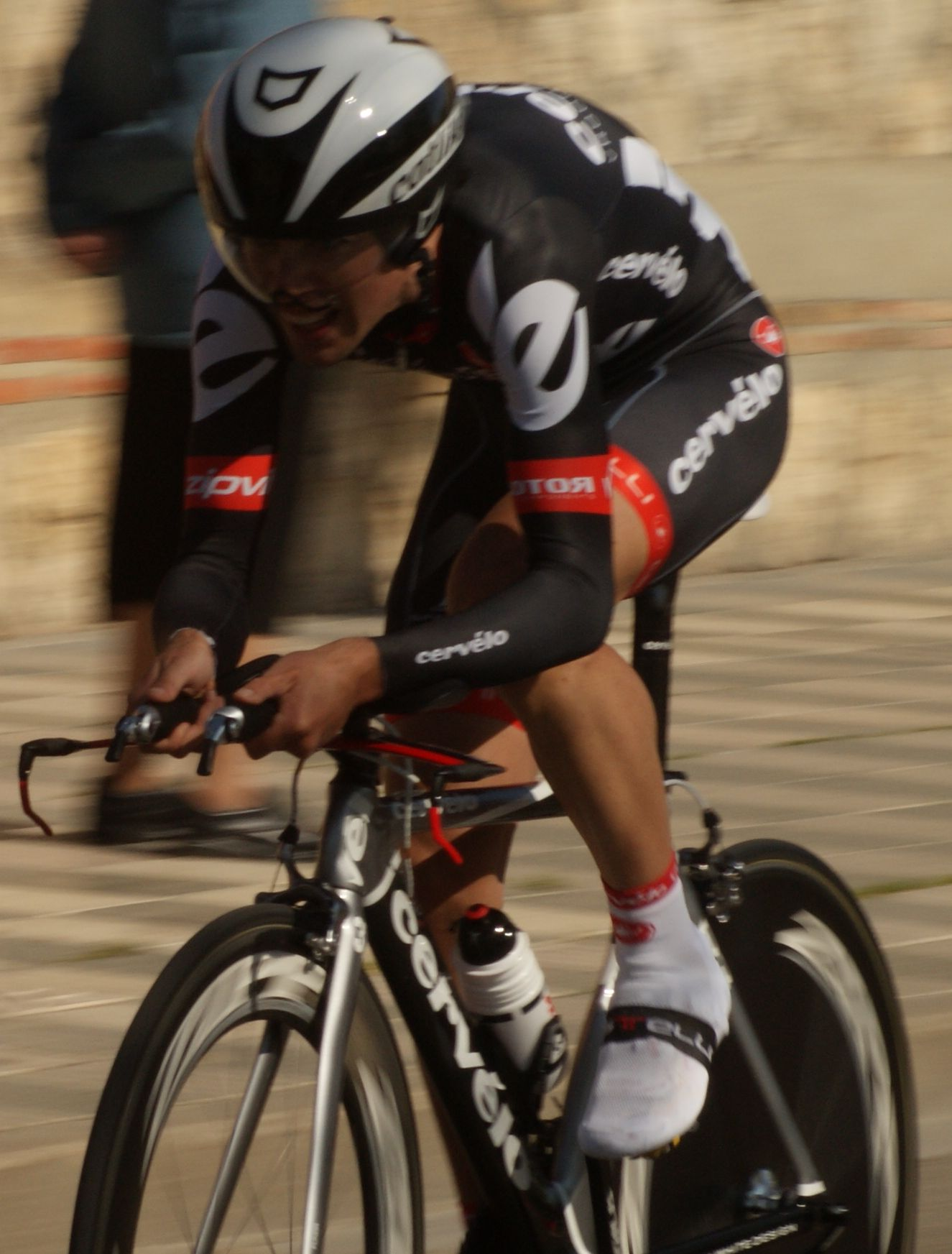
Philip Deignan during the 2009 Vuelta a Castilla y León.

The first UCI event in which the team participated was the 2009 Tour of Qatar from February 1–6, an event in which the team had great success, getting a stage win and also winning the points, team, and youth classifications. The next stage race in which the team got a victory was the 2009 Tour of California, with Hushovd winning a mass sprint finish in the third stage, after Cervélo's leadout train successfully outmaneuvered Team Columbia–High Road's. Haussler took two stage wins later in the month at the 2009 Volta ao Algarve.

The team has seen great success in one-day races in 2009, winning Omloop Het Nieuwsblad, the Giro del Mendrisiotto, and the GP Triberg-Schwarzwald. The team entered nearly 20 major one-day races in the spring season in 2009, failing to make at least the top ten in only one, the Gran Premio dell'Insubria.

Haussler and Hushovd both made the podium in the 2009 Milan – San Remo, narrowly missing out on the top spot to Mark Cavendish after a sprint finish. Haussler been in the lead until the final meters, when he was overtaken by Cavendish, and he appeared quite despondent when talking to reporters after the race.

The team's first Grand Tour was the 2009 Giro d'Italia. Sastre was the team's leader in the race, with finishing on the podium his explicit goal. Sastre eventually finished fourth, but the team won four stages, two by Sastre in the high mountains, one by Simon Gerrans from a breakaway, and Ignatas Konovalovas won the Giro's closing individual time trial.

While the Giro was ongoing, the team also competed at the 2009 Volta a Catalunya, with Hushovd winning two stages.

In the 2009 Tour de France, Hushovd won his second career green jersey, holding off the six stage wins of Mark Cavendish by virtue of a stage win of his own, a penalty assessed to Cavendish in a sprint between the two of them, and a lengthy escape on a mountain stage to claim maximum points in two intermediate sprints. The team got another stage win with Haussler in the Tour's second week. Sastre, on the other hand, had his worst Grand Tour in three years, finishing 17th overall.

== Media ==
Cervélo TestTeam is featured in the documentary Beyond the Peloton, which detailed the team's origins and its first competitive season. It was released online episodically.
