= List of teams and cyclists in the 2009 Tour de France =

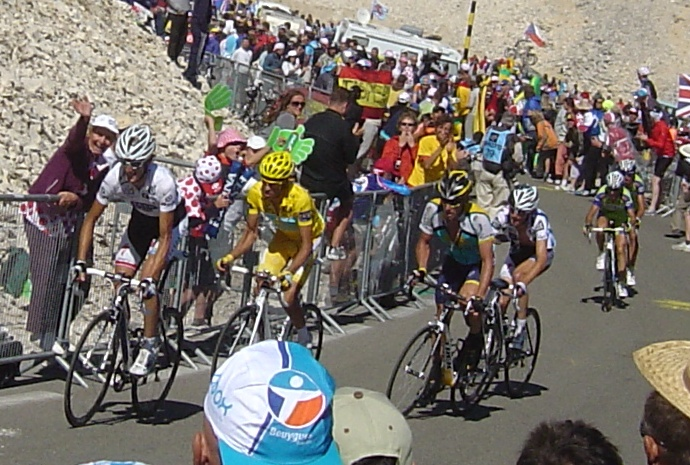
Andy Schleck leading the yellow jersey winner Alberto Contador, Lance Armstrong and his brother Fränk Schleck, up Mont Ventoux on stage 20. The two chasers seen behind the four-man group are Vincenzo Nibali and Roman Kreuziger.

The 2009 Tour de France was the 96th edition of Tour de France, one of cycling's Grand Tours. This Tour featured 180 riders from 30 countries on 20 cycling teams, starting in the principality of Monaco on 4 July and finishing on the Champs-Élysées in Paris on 26 July.

Of the teams taking part in the Giro, 17 were ProTour teams, and 3 were Professional Continental teams. Fuji–Servetto were the only ProTour team not to receive an invitation. The three Professional Continental teams included were Agritubel, Skil–Shimano and Cervélo TestTeam. Each of the 20 teams invited to the race entered a squad of nine riders.

Twenty-four riders abandoned the three-week race before reaching Paris. Alberto Contador of the Astana team won the race; after winning the 15th stage to Verbier, and thus taking over the yellow jersey which he kept until the end of the race.

== Teams ==
Legend
No.	Starting number worn by the rider during the Giro	Pos.	Position in the general classification
‡	Denotes riders born on or after 1 January 1984 eligible for the Young rider classification	HD	Denotes a rider finished outside the time limit, followed by the stage in which they did so
DNS	Denotes a rider who did not start, followed by the stage before which they withdrew	DNF	Denotes a rider who did not finish, followed by the stage in which they withdrew

Cervélo TestTeam CTT
No.		Age	Pos.
1	Carlos Sastre (ESP)	34	17
2	Íñigo Cuesta (ESP)	40	87
3	José Ángel Gómez Marchante (ESP)	29	DNF-17
4	Volodymir Gustov (UKR)	32	45
5	Heinrich Haussler (GER)	25‡	97
6	Thor Hushovd (NOR)	31	106
7	Andreas Klier (GER)	33	155
8	Brett Lancaster (AUS)	29	127
9	Hayden Roulston (NZL)	28	79
Team manager: Theo Maucher

Silence–Lotto SIL
No.		Age	Pos.
11	Cadel Evans (AUS)	32	30
12	Mickaël Delage (FRA)	23‡	101
13	Sebastian Lang (GER)	29	76
14	Matthew Lloyd (AUS)	26	46
15	Staf Scheirlinckx (BEL)	30	123
16	Greg Van Avermaet (BEL)	24‡	89
17	Jurgen Van den Broeck (BEL)	26	15
18	Johan Van Summeren (BEL)	28	93
19	Charly Wegelius (GBR)	31	59
Team manager: Marc Sergeant

Astana AST
No.		Age	Pos.
21	Alberto Contador (ESP)	26	1
22	Lance Armstrong (USA)	37	3
23	Andreas Klöden (GER)	34	6
24	Levi Leipheimer (USA)	35	DNS-13
25	Dimitry Muravyev (KAZ)	30	148
26	Sérgio Paulinho (POR)	29	35
27	Yaroslav Popovych (UKR)	29	41
28	Grégory Rast (SUI)	29	138
29	Haimar Zubeldia (ESP)	32	27
Team manager: Johan Bruyneel

Team Saxo Bank SAX
No.		Age	Pos.
31	Andy Schleck (LUX)	24‡	2
32	Kurt Asle Arvesen (NOR)	34	DNS-11
33	Fabian Cancellara (SUI)	28	91
34	Gustav Larsson (SWE)	28	50
35	Stuart O'Grady (AUS)	35	124
36	Fränk Schleck (LUX)	29	5
37	Chris Anker Sørensen (DEN)	24‡	34
38	Nicki Sørensen (DEN)	34	31
39	Jens Voigt (GER)	37	DNF-16
Team manager: Bjarne Riis

Rabobank RAB
No.		Age	Pos.
41	Denis Menchov (RUS)	31	51
42	Stef Clement (NED)	26	118
43	Juan Antonio Flecha (ESP)	31	102
44	Óscar Freire (ESP)	33	99
45	Juan Manuel Gárate (ESP)	33	62
46	Robert Gesink (NED)	23‡	DNS-6
47	Grischa Niermann (GER)	33	54
48	Joost Posthuma (NED)	28	73
49	Laurens ten Dam (NED)	28	60
Team manager: Harold Knebel

Garmin–Slipstream GRM
No.		Age	Pos.
51	Christian Vande Velde (USA)	33	8
52	Julian Dean (NZL)	34	121
53	Tyler Farrar (USA)	25‡	151
54	Ryder Hesjedal (CAN)	28	49
55	Martijn Maaskant (NED)	25	98
56	David Millar (GBR)	32	85
57	Danny Pate (USA)	30	141
58	Bradley Wiggins (GBR)	29	4
59	David Zabriskie (USA)	30	77
Team manager: Jonathan Vaughters

Euskaltel–Euskadi EUS
No.		Age	Pos.
61	Mikel Astarloza (ESP)	29	11
62	Igor Antón (ESP)	26	66
63	Koldo Fernández (ESP)	27	HD-8
64	Egoi Martínez (ESP)	31	44
65	Juan José Oroz (ESP)	28	107
66	Alan Pérez (ESP)	26	HD-19
67	Rubén Pérez (ESP)	27	72
68	Amets Txurruka (ESP)	26	HD-19
69	Gorka Verdugo (ESP)	30	61
Team manager: Miguel Madariga

Team Columbia–HTC THR
No.		Age	Pos.
71	Mark Cavendish (GBR)	24‡	131
72	Bernhard Eisel (AUT)	28	150
73	Bert Grabsch (GER)	34	134
74	George Hincapie (USA)	36	19
75	Kim Kirchen (LUX)	31	57
76	Tony Martin (GER)	24‡	36
77	Maxime Monfort (BEL)	26	28
78	Mark Renshaw (AUS)	26	149
79	Michael Rogers (AUS)	29	103
Team manager: Bob Stapleton

Ag2r–La Mondiale ALM
No.		Age	Pos.
81	Vladimir Efimkin (RUS)	27	DNF-15
82	José Luis Arrieta (ESP)	38	81
83	Cyril Dessel (FRA)	34	DNF-17
84	Hubert Dupont (FRA)	28	33
85	Stéphane Goubert (FRA)	39	16
86	Lloyd Mondory (FRA)	27	133
87	Rinaldo Nocentini (ITA)	31	14
88	Christophe Riblon (FRA)	28	82
89	Nicolas Roche (IRL)	25‡	23
Team manager: Vincent Lavenu

Liquigas LIQ
No.		Age	Pos.
91	Franco Pellizotti (ITA)	31	37
92	Daniele Bennati (ITA)	28	135
93	Roman Kreuziger (CZE)	23‡	9
94	Aleksandr Kuschynski (BLR)	29	92
95	Vincenzo Nibali (ITA)	24‡	7
96	Fabio Sabatini (ITA)	24‡	147
97	Brian Vandborg (DEN)	27	116
98	Alessandro Vanotti (ITA)	28	120
99	Frederik Willems (BEL)	29	86
Team manager: Roberto Amadio

Française des Jeux FDJ
No.		Age	Pos.
101	Sandy Casar (FRA)	30	12
102	Jérôme Coppel (FRA)	22‡	DNF-12
103	Anthony Geslin (FRA)	29	119
104	Yauheni Hutarovich (BLR)	25	156
105	Sébastien Joly (FRA)	30	DNF-7
106	Christophe Le Mével (FRA)	28	10
107	Jérémy Roy (FRA)	26	48
108	Benoît Vaugrenard (FRA)	27	142
109	Jussi Veikkanen (FIN)	28	108
Team manager: Marc Madiot

Caisse d'Epargne GCE
No.		Age	Pos.
111	Óscar Pereiro (ESP)	31	DNF-8
112	David Arroyo (ESP)	29	69
113	Rui Costa (POR)	23‡	DNS-12
114	Arnaud Coyot (FRA)	28	115
115	Iván Gutiérrez (ESP)	30	71
116	Luis Pasamontes (ESP)	29	39
117	José Joaquín Rojas (ESP)	24‡	84
118	Luis León Sánchez (ESP)	25	26
119	Rigoberto Urán (COL)	22‡	52
Team manager: José Miguel Echavarri

Cofidis COF
No.		Age	Pos.
121	David Moncoutié (FRA)	34	58
122	Stéphane Augé (FRA)	34	136
123	Samuel Dumoulin (FRA)	28	139
124	Leonardo Duque (COL)	29	94
125	Bingen Fernández (ESP)	36	105
126	Christophe Kern (FRA)	28	75
127	Sébastien Minard (FRA)	27	38
128	Amaël Moinard (FRA)	27	65
129	Rémi Pauriol (FRA)	27	43
Team manager: Éric Boyer

Lampre–NGC LAM
No.		Age	Pos.
131	Alessandro Ballan (ITA)	29	95
132	Marco Bandiera (ITA)	25‡	145
133	Marzio Bruseghin (ITA)	35	80
134	Angelo Furlan (ITA)	32	DNF-12
135	David Loosli (SUI)	29	53
136	Daniele Righi (ITA)	33	110
137	Mauro Santambrogio (ITA)	24‡	132
138	Marcin Sapa (POL)	33	146
139	Simon Špilak (SLO)	23‡	109
Team manager: Giuseppe Saronni

Bbox Bouygues Telecom BBO
No.		Age	Pos.
141	Thomas Voeckler (FRA)	30	67
142	Yukiya Arashiro (JPN)	24‡	129
143	William Bonnet (FRA)	27	128
144	Pierrick Fédrigo (FRA)	30	56
145	Saïd Haddou (FRA)	26	143
146	Laurent Lefèvre (FRA)	33	42
147	Alexandre Pichot (FRA)	26	117
148	Pierre Rolland (FRA)	22‡	22
149	Yuri Trofimov (RUS)	25‡	47
Team manager: Jean-René Bernaudeau

Quick-Step QST
No.		Age	Pos.
151	Sylvain Chavanel (FRA)	30	20
152	Carlos Barredo (ESP)	28	63
153	Tom Boonen (BEL)	28	DNS-15
154	Steven de Jongh (NED)	35	153
155	Stijn Devolder (BEL)	29	83
156	Jérôme Pineau (FRA)	29	88
157	Sébastien Rosseler (BEL)	27	104
158	Matteo Tosatto (ITA)	35	114
159	Jurgen Van de Walle (BEL)	32	DNS-3
Team manager: Patrick Lefevere

Team Katusha KAT
No.		Age	Pos.
161	Vladimir Karpets (RUS)	28	13
162	Alexander Bocharov (RUS)	34	18
163	Joan Horrach (ESP)	35	74
164	Mikhail Ignatiev (RUS)	24‡	140
165	Serguei Ivanov (RUS)	34	40
166	Danilo Napolitano (ITA)	28	HD-9
167	Filippo Pozzato (ITA)	27	100
168	Nikolai Trusov (RUS)	24‡	122
169	Stijn Vandenbergh (BEL)	25‡	96
Team manager: Stefano Feltrin

Agritubel AGR
No.		Age	Pos.
171	Christophe Moreau (FRA)	38	29
172	Maxime Bouet (FRA)	22‡	70
173	Sylvain Calzati (FRA)	30	55
174	Brice Feillu (FRA)	23‡	25
175	Romain Feillu (FRA)	25‡	DNF-12
176	Eduardo Gonzalo (ESP)	25	DNF-8
177	David Lelay (FRA)	29	DNF-8
178	Geoffroy Lequatre (FRA)	28	64
179	Nicolas Vogondy (FRA)	31	68
Team manager: David Fornes

Team Milram MRM
No.		Age	Pos.
181	Linus Gerdemann (GER)	26	24
182	Gerald Ciolek (GER)	22‡	126
183	Markus Fothen (GER)	27	125
184	Johannes Fröhlinger (GER)	24‡	78
185	Christian Knees (GER)	28	21
186	Niki Terpstra (NED)	25‡	152
187	Peter Velits (SVK)	24‡	32
188	Fabian Wegmann (GER)	29	137
189	Peter Wrolich (AUT)	35	DNS-13
Team manager: Gerry van Gerwen

Skil–Shimano SKS
No.		Age	Pos.
191	Cyril Lemoine (FRA)	26	144
192	Fumiyuki Beppu (JPN)	26	112
193	Koen de Kort (NED)	26	111
194	Simon Geschke (GER)	23‡	113
195	Jonathan Hivert (FRA)	24‡	154
196	Thierry Hupond (FRA)	24‡	90
197	Piet Rooijakkers (NED)	28	DNF-4
198	Albert Timmer (NED)	24‡	130
199	Kenny van Hummel (NED)	26	DNF-17
Team manager: Iwan Spekenbrink

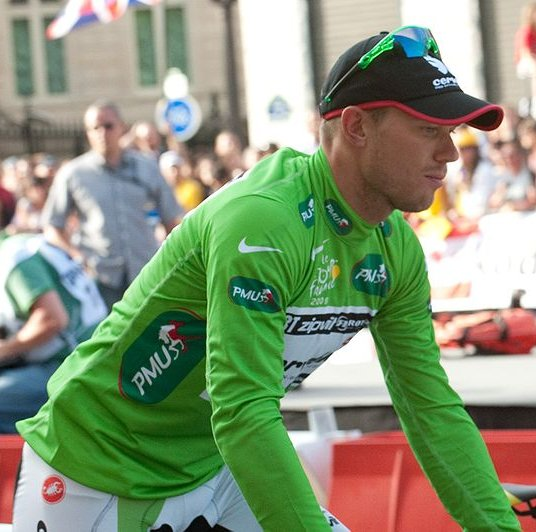
Thor Hushovd, the winner of the Points classification, wearing his green jersey at the last stage in Paris.

== Cyclists ==
Legend
No.	Starting number worn by the rider during the Tour
Pos.	Position in the general classification
‡	Denotes riders born on or after 1 January 1984 eligible for the Young rider classification
HD	Denotes a rider finished outside the time limit, followed by the stage in which they did so
DNS	Denotes a rider who did not start, followed by the stage before which they withdrew
DNF	Denotes a rider who did not finish, followed by the stage in which they withdrew
Age correct as of 4 July 2009, the date on which the Tour began

No.	Rider	Team	Nationality	Age	Pos.
1	Carlos Sastre	Cervélo TestTeam	Spain	34	17
2	Íñigo Cuesta	Cervélo TestTeam	Spain	40	87
3	José Ángel Gómez Marchante	Cervélo TestTeam	Spain	29	DNF-17
4	Volodymir Gustov	Cervélo TestTeam	Ukraine	32	45
5	Heinrich Haussler	Cervélo TestTeam	Germany	25‡	97
6	Thor Hushovd	Cervélo TestTeam	Norway	31	106
7	Andreas Klier	Cervélo TestTeam	Germany	33	155
8	Brett Lancaster	Cervélo TestTeam	Australia	29	127
9	Hayden Roulston	Cervélo TestTeam	New Zealand	28	79
11	Cadel Evans	Silence–Lotto	Australia	32	30
12	Mickaël Delage	Silence–Lotto	France	23‡	101
13	Sebastian Lang	Silence–Lotto	Germany	29	76
14	Matthew Lloyd	Silence–Lotto	Australia	26	46
15	Staf Scheirlinckx	Silence–Lotto	Belgium	30	123
16	Greg Van Avermaet	Silence–Lotto	Belgium	24‡	89
17	Jurgen Van Den Broeck	Silence–Lotto	Belgium	26	15
18	Johan Van Summeren	Silence–Lotto	Belgium	28	93
19	Charly Wegelius	Silence–Lotto	Great Britain	31	59
21	Alberto Contador	Astana	Spain	26	1
22	Lance Armstrong	Astana	United States	37	3
23	Andreas Klöden	Astana	Germany	34	6
24	Levi Leipheimer	Astana	United States	35	DNS-13
25	Dimitry Muravyev	Astana	Kazakhstan	30	148
26	Sérgio Paulinho	Astana	Portugal	29	35
27	Yaroslav Popovych	Astana	Ukraine	29	41
28	Grégory Rast	Astana	Switzerland	29	138
29	Haimar Zubeldia	Astana	Spain	32	27
31	Andy Schleck	Team Saxo Bank	Luxembourg	24‡	2
32	Kurt Asle Arvesen	Team Saxo Bank	Norway	34	DNS-11
33	Fabian Cancellara	Team Saxo Bank	Switzerland	28	91
34	Gustav Larsson	Team Saxo Bank	Sweden	28	50
35	Stuart O'Grady	Team Saxo Bank	Australia	35	124
36	Fränk Schleck	Team Saxo Bank	Luxembourg	29	5
37	Chris Anker Sørensen	Team Saxo Bank	Denmark	24‡	34
38	Nicki Sørensen	Team Saxo Bank	Denmark	34	31
39	Jens Voigt	Team Saxo Bank	Germany	37	DNF-16
41	Denis Menchov	Rabobank	Russia	31	51
42	Stef Clement	Rabobank	Netherlands	26	118
43	Juan Antonio Flecha	Rabobank	Spain	31	102
44	Óscar Freire	Rabobank	Spain	33	99
45	Juan Manuel Gárate	Rabobank	Spain	33	62
46	Robert Gesink	Rabobank	Netherlands	23‡	DNS-6
47	Grischa Niermann	Rabobank	Germany	33	54
48	Joost Posthuma	Rabobank	Netherlands	28	73
49	Laurens ten Dam	Rabobank	Netherlands	28	60
51	Christian Vande Velde	Garmin–Slipstream	United States	33	8
52	Julian Dean	Garmin–Slipstream	New Zealand	34	121
53	Tyler Farrar	Garmin–Slipstream	United States	25‡	151
54	Ryder Hesjedal	Garmin–Slipstream	Canada	28	49
55	Martijn Maaskant	Garmin–Slipstream	Netherlands	25	98
56	David Millar	Garmin–Slipstream	Great Britain	32	85
57	Danny Pate	Garmin–Slipstream	United States	30	141
58	Bradley Wiggins	Garmin–Slipstream	Great Britain	29	4
59	David Zabriskie	Garmin–Slipstream	United States	30	77
61	Mikel Astarloza	Euskaltel–Euskadi	Spain	29	11
62	Igor Antón	Euskaltel–Euskadi	Spain	26	66
63	Koldo Fernández	Euskaltel–Euskadi	Spain	27	HD-8
64	Egoi Martínez	Euskaltel–Euskadi	Spain	31	44
65	Juan José Oroz	Euskaltel–Euskadi	Spain	28	107
66	Alan Pérez	Euskaltel–Euskadi	Spain	26	HD-19
67	Rubén Pérez	Euskaltel–Euskadi	Spain	27	72
68	Amets Txurruka	Euskaltel–Euskadi	Spain	26	HD-19
69	Gorka Verdugo	Euskaltel–Euskadi	Spain	30	61
71	Mark Cavendish	Team Columbia–HTC	Great Britain	24‡	131
72	Bernhard Eisel	Team Columbia–HTC	Austria	28	150
73	Bert Grabsch	Team Columbia–HTC	Germany	34	134
74	George Hincapie	Team Columbia–HTC	United States	36	19
75	Kim Kirchen	Team Columbia–HTC	Luxembourg	31	57
76	Tony Martin	Team Columbia–HTC	Germany	24‡	36
77	Maxime Monfort	Team Columbia–HTC	Belgium	26	28
78	Mark Renshaw	Team Columbia–HTC	Australia	26	149
79	Michael Rogers	Team Columbia–HTC	Australia	29	103
81	Vladimir Efimkin	Ag2r–La Mondiale	Russia	27	DNF-15
82	José Luis Arrieta	Ag2r–La Mondiale	Spain	38	81
83	Cyril Dessel	Ag2r–La Mondiale	France	34	DNF-17
84	Hubert Dupont	Ag2r–La Mondiale	France	28	33
85	Stéphane Goubert	Ag2r–La Mondiale	France	39	16
86	Lloyd Mondory	Ag2r–La Mondiale	France	27	133
87	Rinaldo Nocentini	Ag2r–La Mondiale	Italy	31	14
88	Christophe Riblon	Ag2r–La Mondiale	France	28	82
89	Nicolas Roche	Ag2r–La Mondiale	Ireland	25‡	23
91	Franco Pellizotti	Liquigas	Italy	31	37
92	Daniele Bennati	Liquigas	Italy	28	135
93	Roman Kreuziger	Liquigas	Czech Republic	23‡	9
94	Aleksandr Kuschynski	Liquigas	Belarus	29	92
95	Vincenzo Nibali	Liquigas	Italy	24‡	7
96	Fabio Sabatini	Liquigas	Italy	24‡	147
97	Brian Vandborg	Liquigas	Denmark	27	116
98	Alessandro Vanotti	Liquigas	Italy	28	120
99	Frederik Willems	Liquigas	Belgium	29	86
101	Sandy Casar	Française des Jeux	France	30	12
102	Jérôme Coppel	Française des Jeux	France	22‡	DNF-12
103	Anthony Geslin	Française des Jeux	France	29	119
104	Yauheni Hutarovich	Française des Jeux	Belarus	25	156
105	Sébastien Joly	Française des Jeux	France	30	DNF-7
106	Christophe Le Mével	Française des Jeux	France	28	10
107	Jérémy Roy	Française des Jeux	France	26	48
108	Benoît Vaugrenard	Française des Jeux	France	27	142
109	Jussi Veikkanen	Française des Jeux	Finland	28	108
111	Óscar Pereiro	Caisse d'Epargne	Spain	31	DNF-8
112	David Arroyo	Caisse d'Epargne	Spain	29	69
113	Rui Costa	Caisse d'Epargne	Portugal	23‡	DNS-12
114	Arnaud Coyot	Caisse d'Epargne	France	28	115
115	Iván Gutiérrez	Caisse d'Epargne	Spain	30	71
116	Luis Pasamontes	Caisse d'Epargne	Spain	29	39
117	José Joaquín Rojas	Caisse d'Epargne	Spain	24‡	84
118	Luis León Sánchez	Caisse d'Epargne	Spain	25	26
119	Rigoberto Urán	Caisse d'Epargne	Colombia	22‡	52
121	David Moncoutié	Cofidis	France	34	58
122	Stéphane Augé	Cofidis	France	34	136
123	Samuel Dumoulin	Cofidis	France	28	139
124	Leonardo Duque	Cofidis	Colombia	29	94
125	Bingen Fernández	Cofidis	Spain	36	105
126	Christophe Kern	Cofidis	France	28	75
127	Sébastien Minard	Cofidis	France	27	38
128	Amaël Moinard	Cofidis	France	27	65
129	Rémi Pauriol	Cofidis	France	27	43
131	Alessandro Ballan	Lampre–NGC	Italy	29	95
132	Marco Bandiera	Lampre–NGC	Italy	25‡	145
133	Marzio Bruseghin	Lampre–NGC	Italy	35	80
134	Angelo Furlan	Lampre–NGC	Italy	32	DNF-12
135	David Loosli	Lampre–NGC	Switzerland	29	53
136	Daniele Righi	Lampre–NGC	Italy	33	110
137	Mauro Santambrogio	Lampre–NGC	Italy	24‡	132
138	Marcin Sapa	Lampre–NGC	Poland	33	146
139	Simon Špilak	Lampre–NGC	Slovenia	23‡	109
141	Thomas Voeckler	Bbox Bouygues Telecom	France	30	67
142	Yukiya Arashiro	Bbox Bouygues Telecom	Japan	24‡	129
143	William Bonnet	Bbox Bouygues Telecom	France	27	128
144	Pierrick Fédrigo	Bbox Bouygues Telecom	France	30	56
145	Saïd Haddou	Bbox Bouygues Telecom	France	26	143
146	Laurent Lefèvre	Bbox Bouygues Telecom	France	33	42
147	Alexandre Pichot	Bbox Bouygues Telecom	France	26	117
148	Pierre Rolland	Bbox Bouygues Telecom	France	22‡	22
149	Yuri Trofimov	Bbox Bouygues Telecom	Russia	25‡	47
151	Sylvain Chavanel	Quick-Step	France	30	20
152	Carlos Barredo	Quick-Step	Spain	28	63
153	Tom Boonen	Quick-Step	Belgium	28	DNS-15
154	Steven de Jongh	Quick-Step	Netherlands	35	153
155	Stijn Devolder	Quick-Step	Belgium	29	83
156	Jérôme Pineau	Quick-Step	France	29	88
157	Sébastien Rosseler	Quick-Step	Belgium	27	104
158	Matteo Tosatto	Quick-Step	Italy	35	114
159	Jurgen Van de Walle	Quick-Step	Belgium	32	DNS-3
161	Vladimir Karpets	Team Katusha	Russia	28	13
162	Alexandre Botcharov	Team Katusha	Russia	34	18
163	Joan Horrach	Team Katusha	Spain	35	74
164	Mikhail Ignatiev	Team Katusha	Russia	24‡	140
165	Serguei Ivanov	Team Katusha	Russia	34	40
166	Danilo Napolitano	Team Katusha	Italy	28	HD-9
167	Filippo Pozzato	Team Katusha	Italy	27	100
168	Nikolai Trusov	Team Katusha	Russia	24‡	122
169	Stijn Vandenbergh	Team Katusha	Belgium	24‡	96
171	Christophe Moreau	Agritubel	France	38	29
172	Maxime Bouet	Agritubel	France	22‡	70
173	Sylvain Calzati	Agritubel	France	30	55
174	Brice Feillu	Agritubel	France	23‡	25
175	Romain Feillu	Agritubel	France	25‡	DNF-12
176	Eduardo Gonzalo	Agritubel	Spain	25	DNF-8
177	David Lelay	Agritubel	France	29	DNF-8
178	Geoffroy Lequatre	Agritubel	France	28	64
179	Nicolas Vogondy	Agritubel	France	31	68
181	Linus Gerdemann	Team Milram	Germany	26	24
182	Gerald Ciolek	Team Milram	Germany	22‡	126
183	Markus Fothen	Team Milram	Germany	27	125
184	Johannes Fröhlinger	Team Milram	Germany	24‡	78
185	Christian Knees	Team Milram	Germany	28	21
186	Niki Terpstra	Team Milram	Netherlands	25‡	152
187	Peter Velits	Team Milram	Slovakia	24‡	32
188	Fabian Wegmann	Team Milram	Germany	29	137
189	Peter Wrolich	Team Milram	Austria	35	DNS-13
191	Cyril Lemoine	Skil–Shimano	France	26	144
192	Fumiyuki Beppu	Skil–Shimano	Japan	26	112
193	Koen de Kort	Skil–Shimano	Netherlands	26	111
194	Simon Geschke	Skil–Shimano	Germany	23‡	113
195	Jonathan Hivert	Skil–Shimano	France	24‡	154
196	Thierry Hupond	Skil–Shimano	France	24‡	90
197	Piet Rooijakkers	Skil–Shimano	Netherlands	28	DNF-4
198	Albert Timmer	Skil–Shimano	Netherlands	24‡	130
199	Kenny van Hummel	Skil–Shimano	Netherlands	26	DNF-17

== Nationality ==
Country	Number of riders	Finishers	Stage wins
Australia	6	6	0
Austria	2	1	0
Belarus	2	2	0
Belgium	11	9	0
Canada	1	1	0
Colombia	2	2	0
Czech Republic	1	1	0
Denmark	3	3	1
Finland	1	1	0
France	41	36	3
Germany	15	14	1
Ireland	1	1	0
Italy	15	13	0
Japan	2	2	0
Kazakhstan	1	1	0
Luxembourg	3	3	1
Netherlands	11	8	0
New Zealand	2	2	0
Norway	2	1	1
Poland	1	1	0
Portugal	2	1	0
Russia	8	7	1
Slovakia	1	1	0
Slovenia	1	1	0
Spain	28	22	5
Sweden	1	1	0
Switzerland	3	3	1
Ukraine	2	2	0
Great Britain	4	4	6
United States	7	6	0

Selection information

- Rabobank announced their selection on 18 June, including Denis Menchov, Grischa Niermann, Juan Antonio Flecha, Óscar Freire, Juan Manuel Gárate, Stef Clement, Joost Posthuma, Laurens ten Dam and Robert Gesink.
- Ag2r–La Mondiale announced Vladimir Efimkin, Cyril Dessel, Stéphane Goubert, Lloyd Mondory, and José Luis Arrieta on 21 June. Christophe Riblon, Nicolas Roche, Hubert Dupont, and Cyril Dessel complete the roster.
- Team Saxo Bank announced their selection on 22 June, including Andy Schleck, Fränk Schleck, Fabian Cancellara, Stuart O'Grady, Jens Voigt, Nicki Sørensen, Chris Anker Sørensen, Gustav Larsson and Kurt Asle Arvesen.
- Garmin–Slipstream announced their team on 24 June as Julian Dean, David Millar, Christian Vande Velde, Bradley Wiggins, David Zabriskie, Tyler Farrar, Dan Martin, Ryder Hesjedal and Danny Pate. Dan Martin withdrew due to a long-term knee problem, and was replaced by Martijn Maaskant, who had previously been named as first reserve.
- Team Katusha announced Filippo Pozzato, Vladimir Karpets, Danilo Napolitano, Alexander Bocharov, Serguei Ivanov, Mikhail Ignatiev, Nikolai Trusov, Joan Horrach and Stijn Vandenbergh.
- Cervélo TestTeam announced Heinrich Haussler, Thor Hushovd, and Carlos Sastre on 23 June. Íñigo Cuesta, José Ángel Gómez Marchante, Volodymir Gustov, Andreas Klier, Brett Lancaster and Hayden Roulston were announced the following day.
- Française des Jeux announced Sandy Casar, Anthony Geslin, Jérôme Coppel, Yauheni Hutarovich, Sébastien Joly, Christophe Le Mével, Benoît Vaugrenard and Jussi Veikkanen. The ninth rider will be either Rémy Di Gregorio or Jérémy Roy.
- Astana announced that Alberto Contador, Lance Armstrong, Andreas Klöden, Levi Leipheimer, Yaroslav Popovych, Sérgio Paulinho, Dmitriy Muravyev, Grégory Rast and Haimar Zubeldia will be racing in the 2009 Tour de France.
- Cofidis announced their roster on June 15. Stéphane Augé, Samuel Dumoulin, Leonardo Duque, Bingen Fernández, Christophe Kern, Sébastien Minard, Amaël Moinard, David Moncoutié, Rémi Pauriol make up the Cofidis roster.
- Team Milram announced that Gerald Ciolek, Markus Fothen, Johannes Fröhlinger, Linus Gerdemann, Christian Knees, Niki Terpstra, Peter Velits, Fabian Wegmann and Peter Wrolich will race. Ciolek and Gerdemann will be co-leaders.
- Agritubel announced Maxime Bouet, David Lelay, and Christophe Moreau on 23 June. On June 29 the other six riders were announced. Sylvain Calzati, Nicolas Vogondy, Brice Feillu, Romain Feillu, Eduardo Gonzalo, Geoffroy Lequatre make up the rest of the roster.
- Bbox Bouygues Telecom announced Yukiya Arashiro, William Bonnet, Pierrick Fédrigo, Pierre Rolland, Yuri Trofimov and Thomas Voeckler on 23 June.
- Caisse d'Epargne has confirmed David Arroyo, Iván Gutiérrez, Luis Pasamontes, Luis León Sánchez, Xabier Zandio and Óscar Pereiro will start. They have also announced that Alejandro Valverde will not be on their squad due to the ban imposed upon him by the Italian National Olympic Committee.
- Euskaltel–Euskadi announced their roster on June 26. Mikel Astarloza, Egoi Martínez, Alan Pérez, Amets Txurruka, Gorka Verdugo, Rubén Pérez, Juan José Oroz, Koldo Fernández, and Igor Antón make up the roster.
- Liquigas announced Daniele Bennati, Vincenzo Nibali, Franco Pellizotti, Roman Kreuziger, Fabio Sabatini, Aleksandr Kuschynski, Alessandro Vanotti, Frederik Willems and Brian Bach Vandborg.
- Silence–Lotto has confirmed Cadel Evans, Thomas Dekker, Mickaël Delage, Sebastian Lang, Matthew Lloyd, Staf Scheirlinckx, Greg Van Avermaet, Jurgen Van den Broeck, and Johan Vansummeren as of 26 June. Dekker was subsequently suspended by the team after a re-test of a December 2007 sample revealed use of erythropoietin, and he was replaced by Charlie Wegelius.
- Skil–Shimano announced Simon Geschke, Jonathan Hivert, Cyril Lemoine, Piet Rooijakkers, Albert Timmer and Kenny van Hummel on 23 June. On June 29 the other three riders were announced. Fumiyuki Beppu, Thierry Hupond, and Koen de Kort make up the roster.
- Lampre–NGC announced their roster on June 26. Marco Bandiera, Angelo Furlan, Marco Marzano, Daniele Righi, Simon Špilak, Massimiliano Mori, Mirco Lorenzetto, Marzio Bruseghin, and Alessandro Ballan make up their roster.
- Quick-Step announced their short list on June 26. Sylvain Chavanel, Jérôme Pineau, Stijn Devolder, and Carlos Barredo were on the short list. On June 29 the other five riders were announced. Matteo Tosatto, Steven de Jongh, Jurgen Van de Walle, and Jérôme Pineau make up the roster. Tom Boonen or Allan Davis will receive the ninth spot on the roster.
- Team Columbia–HTC announced their roster on June 26. Mark Cavendish, George Hincapie, Tony Martin, Mark Renshaw, Michael Rogers, Maxime Monfort, Kim Kirchen, Bernhard Eisel, and Marcus Burghardt make up the roster.
