= 2009 Tour de France, Stage 12 to Stage 21 =

Stage of cycling race

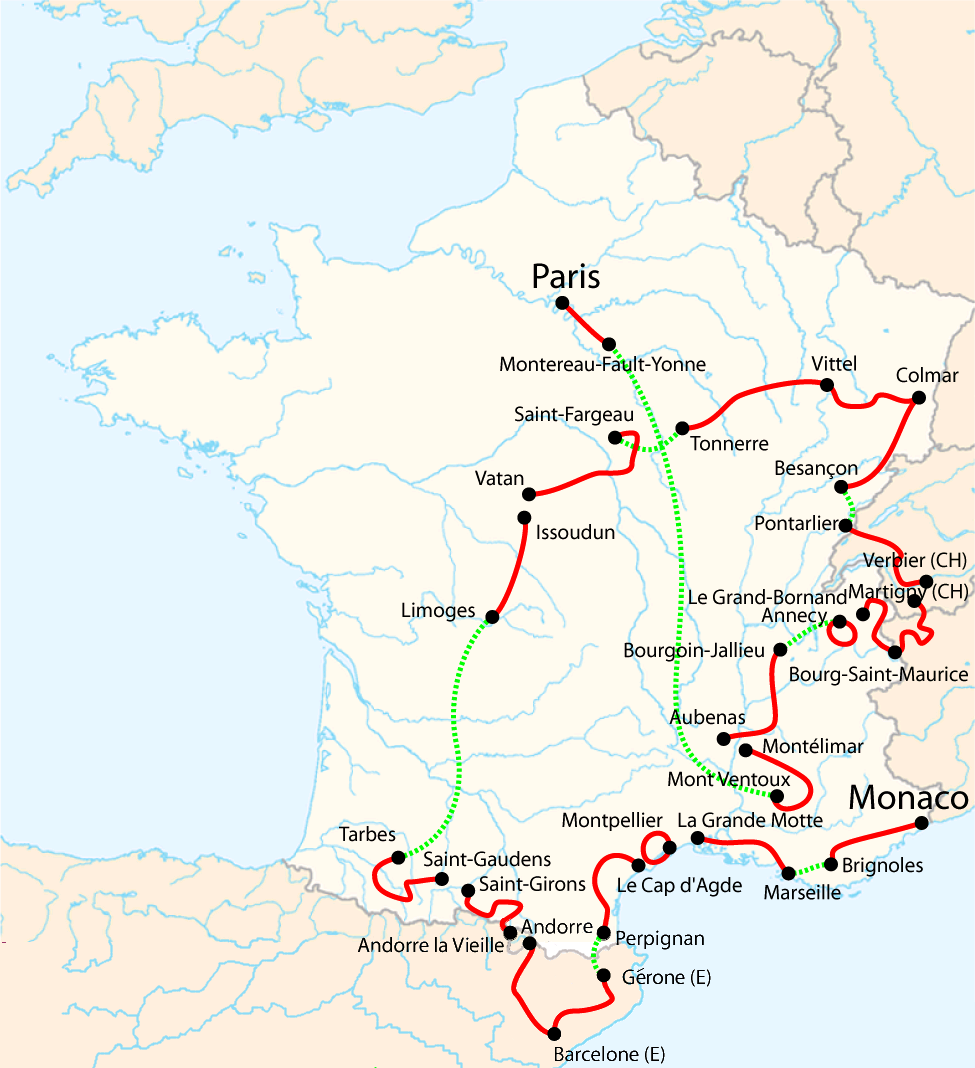
Overview of the stages

These were the individual stages of the 2009 Tour de France, with Stage 12 on 16 July and Stage 21 on 26 July.

== Stages ==
- s.t. indicates that the rider crossed the finish line in the same group as the one receiving the time above him, and was therefore credited with the same finishing time.

=== Stage 12 ===
16 July 2009 – Tonnerre to Vittel, 200 km

This was considered a flat stage, but had six hills that contributed points towards the climbers' competition. After some unsuccessful attempts at breakaways early in the stage, after 64 km Laurent Lefèvre started a breakaway. He was followed by the leader in the polka dot jersey category, Egoi Martínez, and the third-placed rider in that category, Franco Pellizotti, along with Sylvain Calzati, Markus Fothen, and Rémi Pauriol. Ten km later, they were joined by Nicki Sørensen.

The peloton was led by Nocentini's Ag2r–La Mondiale team, with no effort made by the teams of the sprinters to chase down the escape group. The lead held by the escape group increased over the last 40 km, from less than four minutes to over six. With 22 km remaining, Sørensen launched an attack with only Calzati joining him. At 5.5 km, he again attacked, dropping Calzati and remaining clear to win the stage by 48 seconds.

Mark Cavendish had said that he was interested in earning stage wins rather than pursuing the points jersey. However, he increased his lead in that competition by taking points at the first intermediate sprint of the day and leading the peloton home.

Potential GC contenders Levi Leipheimer and Cadel Evans were involved in a fall in the closing stages of the race, but as the incident was within the last 3 km they were credited with the same time as the rest of the peloton. But before stage 13, Leipheimer would abandon the race due to a broken wrist.

Stage 12 result

Rank	Rider	Team	Time
1	Nicki Sørensen (DEN)	Team Saxo Bank	4h 52' 24"
2	Laurent Lefèvre (FRA)	Bbox Bouygues Telecom	+ 48"
DSQ	~~Franco Pellizotti (ITA)~~	~~Liquigas~~	~~s.t.~~
3	Markus Fothen (GER)	Team Milram	s.t.
4	Egoi Martínez (ESP)	Euskaltel–Euskadi	s.t.
5	Sylvain Calzati (FRA)	Agritubel	s.t.
6	Rémi Pauriol (FRA)	Cofidis	+ 1' 33"
7	Mark Cavendish (GBR)	Team Columbia–HTC	+ 5' 58"
8	Thor Hushovd (NOR)	Cervélo TestTeam	s.t.
9	Marco Bandiera (ITA)	Lampre–NGC	s.t.

General classification after stage 12

Rank	Rider	Team	Time
1	Rinaldo Nocentini (ITA)	Ag2r–La Mondiale	48h 27' 21"
2	Alberto Contador (ESP)	Astana	+ 6"
DSQ	~~Lance Armstrong (USA)~~	~~Astana~~	~~+ 8"~~
4	Levi Leipheimer (USA)	Astana	+ 39"
5	Bradley Wiggins (GBR)	Garmin–Slipstream	+ 46"
6	Andreas Klöden (GER)	Astana	+ 54"
7	Tony Martin (GER)	Team Columbia–HTC	+ 1' 00"
8	Christian Vande Velde (USA)	Garmin–Slipstream	+ 1' 24"
9	Andy Schleck (LUX)	Team Saxo Bank	+ 1' 49"
10	Vincenzo Nibali (ITA)	Liquigas	+ 1' 54"

=== Stage 13 ===
17 July 2009 – Vittel to Colmar, 200 km

This was a medium-mountain stage, with five categorized climbs, including one first category mountain, the Col du Platzerwasel. Christophe Moreau launched an attack after just 3 km, and was joined by Juan Manuel Gárate, Jens Voigt, Rigoberto Urán, Heinrich Haussler, Sylvain Chavanel and Rubén Pérez. These last three moved away from the rest of the escape on the descent from the first climb, and while the rest of the escapees returned to the peloton, the lead trio gained an advantage of 9'10" on the second climb. Pérez was dropped on the climb of the day's highest mountain, and Haussler dropped Chavanel on its descent, and rode the last 50 km alone to win the stage more than 6½ minutes ahead of the peloton. A late attack by Amets Txurruka and Brice Feillu allowed the former to gain several minutes on the peloton, but Feillu, only 4'26" behind the yellow jersey at the start of the day failed to keep pace with his fellow escaper, and once it was clear that he would not make a serious challenge to the overall leadership, the peloton eased its chase, and riders who had become detached from the elite group were able to rejoin the peloton, including Thor Hushovd who took enough points in the final placings to regain the green jersey. Franco Pellizotti took points on three of the five climbs, thus gaining enough points to assume leadership of the King of the Mountains classification. Simon Špilak finished the stage alone more than ¾ hour behind Haussler, but the Tour officials acknowledged that he had been delayed by errors in re-opening the roads to the public earlier than should have been done, and that this contributed to his late finish, and so he was not eliminated. Óscar Freire and Julian Dean were both hit by pellets fired from an air gun during the stage, but were able to continue on the Tour.

Stage 13 result

Rank	Rider	Team	Time
1	Heinrich Haussler (GER)	Cervélo TestTeam	4h 56' 26"
2	Amets Txurruka (ESP)	Euskaltel–Euskadi	+ 4' 11"
3	Brice Feillu (FRA)	Agritubel	+ 6' 13"
4	Sylvain Chavanel (FRA)	Quick-Step	+ 6' 31"
5	Peter Velits (SVK)	Team Milram	+ 6' 43"
6	Thor Hushovd (NOR)	Cervélo TestTeam	s.t.
7	Vladimir Efimkin (RUS)	Ag2r–La Mondiale	s.t.
8	Bradley Wiggins (GBR)	Garmin–Slipstream	s.t.
9	George Hincapie (USA)	Team Columbia–HTC	s.t.
10	Andy Schleck (LUX)	Team Saxo Bank	s.t.

General classification after stage 13

Rank	Rider	Team	Time
1	Rinaldo Nocentini (ITA)	Ag2r–La Mondiale	53h 30' 30"
2	Alberto Contador (ESP)	Astana	+ 6"
DSQ	~~Lance Armstrong (USA)~~	~~Astana~~	~~+ 8"~~
4	Bradley Wiggins (GBR)	Garmin–Slipstream	+ 46"
5	Andreas Klöden (GER)	Astana	+ 54"
6	Tony Martin (GER)	Team Columbia–HTC	+ 1' 00"
7	Christian Vande Velde (USA)	Garmin–Slipstream	+ 1' 24"
8	Andy Schleck (LUX)	Team Saxo Bank	+ 1' 49"
9	Vincenzo Nibali (ITA)	Liquigas	+ 1' 54"
10	Luis León Sánchez (ESP)	Caisse d'Epargne	+ 2' 16"

=== Stage 14 ===
18 July 2009 – Colmar to Besançon, 199 km

This was a relatively flat stage, with a category 3 climb either side of the halfway point. A woman was killed and two other spectators injured when they were hit by a police motorcycle in Wittelsheim, the first fatality connected to the Tour since 2002.

A fourteen-man break, initiated after 14 km, by Martijn Maaskant dominated the day's racing. The group was reduced to 12 as Mark Cavendish made a tactical decision to return to the peloton, and Jens Voigt had a puncture inefficiently repaired by the neutral service vehicle, but otherwise remained clear, with a lead that reached nearly nine minutes. Among the escapees were George Hincapie, who started the day in 28th place, 5'25" behind the leader, and Christophe Le Mével, two places and 38 seconds further back. The Ag2r–La Mondiale team of the yellow jersey wearer Rinaldo Nocentini seemed to be unwilling or unable to defend his overall lead, and the pace of the peloton was dictated for most of the stage by Astana, and in the latter stages by Garmin–Slipstream. As it became clear that day's winner would come from among the group, there were several attacks, of which the effort by Sergei Ivanov with 11 km remaining was decisive. He won the stage by 16 seconds, with the peloton recovering enough time to preserve Nocentini's tenure of the yellow jersey by 5 seconds. It was suggested that Garmin's role in preventing Hincapie gaining the overall lead was influenced by their rivalry with his Team Columbia–HTC, but this was denied.

Green jersey rivals Mark Cavendish and Thor Hushovd were in a hotly contested sprint at the head of the peloton, and although Cavendish finished ahead, he was later relegated to the last position in the peloton for "irregular sprinting", specifically maneuvering Hushovd toward a barricade in the final 300 meters, with a net loss of 14 points to his Norwegian rival.

Stage 14 result

Rank	Rider	Team	Time
1	Sergei Ivanov (RUS)	Team Katusha	4h 37' 46"
2	Nicolas Roche (IRE)	Ag2r–La Mondiale	+ 16"
3	Hayden Roulston (NZL)	Cervélo TestTeam	s.t.
4	Martijn Maaskant (NED)	Garmin–Slipstream	s.t.
5	Sébastien Minard (FRA)	Cofidis	s.t.
6	Daniele Righi (ITA)	Lampre–NGC	s.t.
7	Christophe Le Mével (FRA)	Française des Jeux	s.t.
8	George Hincapie (USA)	Team Columbia–HTC	s.t.
9	Daniele Bennati (ITA)	Liquigas	s.t.
10	Gerald Ciolek (GER)	Team Milram	+ 22"

General classification after stage 14

Rank	Rider	Team	Time
1	Rinaldo Nocentini (ITA)	Ag2r–La Mondiale	58h 13' 52"
2	George Hincapie (USA)	Team Columbia–HTC	+ 5"
3	Alberto Contador (ESP)	Astana	+ 6"
DSQ	~~Lance Armstrong (USA)~~	~~Astana~~	~~+ 8"~~
5	Christophe Le Mével (FRA)	Française des Jeux	+ 43"
6	Bradley Wiggins (GBR)	Garmin–Slipstream	+ 46"
7	Andreas Klöden (GER)	Astana	+ 54"
8	Tony Martin (GER)	Team Columbia–HTC	+ 1' 00"
9	Christian Vande Velde (USA)	Garmin–Slipstream	+ 1' 24"
10	Andy Schleck (LUX)	Team Saxo Bank	+ 1' 49"

=== Stage 15 ===
Stage 15 riding profile

19 July 2009 – Pontarlier to Verbier (Switzerland), 207 km

The Tour reached the Alps, with four third category climbs in the first half of the stage, and the second half featuring the second category climb on the Col des Mosses (1,445 m elevation) and the race's second mountaintop finish at Verbier in Switzerland, at about the same elevation. Tom Boonen did not start the stage, and Vladimir Efimkin, who started in the top 20 overall, withdrew about halfway through the stage. Several early attacks failed to get any lasting gap ahead of the peloton, although they did allow Franco Pellizotti to increase his lead in the climbers' competition. The longest lasting escape of the day took place after 40 km, and had a number of changes of personnel before it settled to a body of ten riders, including Mikel Astarloza who was 18th overall, 3'02" behind the leader, at the beginning of the day, and who was "virtual leader" until the last 40 km. Rinaldo Nocentini's Ag2r–La Mondiale team made little effort to defend his position as overall leader, and the Astana and Liquigas teams dominated the chase to the bottom of the climb to Verbier. The breakaway was overhauled by most of the contenders for a high overall placing, with Denis Menchov the most notable absentee from the selection, Simon Špilak having survived for longest. As on the climb to Arcalis, Alberto Contador made a telling attack on the elite group, this time with 6 km remaining, and only Andy Schleck went in pursuit. Contador continued to increase his lead all the way to the line, winning both the stage and the yellow jersey. Andy Schleck came in second and took over the white jersey from Tony Martin after 13 stages.

Stage 15 result

Rank	Rider	Team	Time
1	Alberto Contador (ESP)	Astana	5h 03' 58"
2	Andy Schleck (LUX)	Team Saxo Bank	+ 43"
3	Vincenzo Nibali (ITA)	Liquigas	+ 1' 03"
4	Fränk Schleck (LUX)	Team Saxo Bank	+ 1' 06"
5	Bradley Wiggins (GBR)	Garmin–Slipstream	s.t.
6	Carlos Sastre (ESP)	Cervélo TestTeam	s.t.
7	Cadel Evans (AUS)	Silence–Lotto	+ 1' 26"
8	Andreas Klöden (GER)	Astana	+ 1' 29"
DSQ	~~Lance Armstrong (USA)~~	~~Astana~~	~~+ 1' 35"~~
9	Kim Kirchen (LUX)	Team Columbia–HTC	+ 1' 55"

General classification after stage 15

Rank	Rider	Team	Time
1	Alberto Contador (ESP)	Astana	63h 17' 56"
DSQ	~~Lance Armstrong (USA)~~	~~Astana~~	~~+ 1' 37"~~
3	Bradley Wiggins (GBR)	Garmin–Slipstream	+ 1' 46"
4	Andreas Klöden (GER)	Astana	+ 2' 17"
5	Andy Schleck (LUX)	Team Saxo Bank	+ 2' 26"
6	Rinaldo Nocentini (ITA)	Ag2r–La Mondiale	+ 2' 30"
7	Vincenzo Nibali (ITA)	Liquigas	+ 2' 51"
8	Tony Martin (GER)	Team Columbia–HTC	+ 3' 07"
9	Christophe Le Mével (FRA)	Française des Jeux	+ 3' 09"
10	Fränk Schleck (LUX)	Team Saxo Bank	+ 3' 25"

=== Rest day ===
20 July 2009 – Verbier (Switzerland)

The second rest day took place where the previous day's stage ended.

=== Stage 16 ===
21 July 2009 – Martigny (Switzerland) to Bourg-Saint-Maurice, 160 km

The return to racing after the second rest day featured two long climbs and their descents: the Col du Grand-Saint-Bernard, the highest point in this year's Tour at 2,473 meters, and the Col du Petit Saint-Bernard, at which stage the race returned to France. An early break initiated by Maxime Bouet grew to 26 members, and mountains classifications challengers Franco Pellizotti and Egoi Martínez, along with Vladimir Karpets moved clear of the group as they approached the first climb. Martínez could not stay with the other two escapees, and Pellizotti took maximum points over the pass. In the long flat passage between both passes, the two leaders were caught by the large group and together started the last climb. Just before the top of this second climb, Pellizotti and Jurgen Van den Broeck who had been leading the climb, were joined by Mikel Astarloza and Amaël Moinard. Four further escapees also remained ahead of the favourites, but among that group an attack by Andy Schleck caused an elite group in which he was joined by his brother Fränk Schleck, Alberto Contador, Bradley Wiggins, Vincenzo Nibali and Andreas Klöden. Lance Armstrong led a response, and there was no lasting split among the GC contenders apart from Cadel Evans, who failed to stay with the yellow jersey group. Pellizotti again led over the top of the climb, and in the approach to the finishing town, Astarloza broke clear with 2 km remaining to win the stage, as the four chasers caught the remnants of the lead group. Jens Voigt fell hard while descending the col du Petit-Saint-Bernard with the group of the yellow jersey, he fractured his right cheekbone and suffered a concussion, and had to abandon the Tour. However, five days after the Tour finished the UCI announced that the initial stage winner Mikel Astarloza tested positive for EPO in an out-of-competition test on June 26, eight days before the race started. Astarloza was removed from the results, and the stage win transferred to Sandy Casar.

Stage 16 result

Rank	Rider	Team	Time
DSQ	~~Mikel Astarloza (ESP)~~	~~Euskaltel–Euskadi~~	
1	Sandy Casar (FRA)	Française des Jeux	4h 14' 26"
2	Pierrick Fédrigo (FRA)	Bbox Bouygues Telecom	s.t.
3	Nicolas Roche (IRL)	Ag2r–La Mondiale	s.t.
4	Jurgen Van den Broeck (BEL)	Silence–Lotto	s.t.
5	Amaël Moinard (FRA)	Cofidis	s.t.
DSQ	~~Franco Pellizotti (ITA)~~	~~Liquigas~~	~~+ 5"~~
7	Stephane Goubert (FRA)	Ag2r–La Mondiale	s.t.
8	Christophe Moreau (FRA)	Agritubel	+ 54"
9	Alberto Contador (ESP)	Astana	s.t.

General classification after stage 16

Rank	Rider	Team	Time
1	Alberto Contador (ESP)	Astana	67h 33' 15"
DSQ	~~Lance Armstrong (USA)~~	~~Astana~~	~~+ 1' 37"~~
3	Bradley Wiggins (GBR)	Garmin–Slipstream	+ 1' 46"
4	Andreas Klöden (GER)	Astana	+ 2' 17"
5	Andy Schleck (LUX)	Team Saxo Bank	+ 2' 26"
6	Vincenzo Nibali (ITA)	Liquigas	+ 2' 51"
7	Christophe Le Mével (FRA)	Française des Jeux	+ 3' 09"
8	Fränk Schleck (LUX)	Team Saxo Bank	+ 3' 25"
9	Carlos Sastre (ESP)	Cervélo TestTeam	+ 3' 52"
10	Christian Vande Velde (USA)	Garmin–Slipstream	+ 3' 59"

=== Stage 17 ===
22 July 2009 – Bourg-Saint-Maurice to Le Grand-Bornand, 169 km

This stage had five categorized climbs on it, including four category 1 climbs, and was regarded the queen stage of this year's Tour. The first three quarters of the stage were dominated by the consolidation of the lead in both the climbers' and sprinters' competitions. A group of 20, led by Franco Pellizotti, crossed the first hill, Cormet de Roselend, before being closed down and passed by green jersey holder, Thor Hushovd. He remained in a solo lead for more than 80 km (50 mi), climbing two categorised mountains alone (Col des Saisies and Côte d'Araches) in order to gain maximum points at the intermediate sprints. Pellizotti was the first of the following group over the hills, gaining maximum of the remaining climber's points. On the second to last mountain, the Col de Romme, a series of attacks by Andy and Fränk Schleck overhauled the breakaway group, and left the Luxembourgian brothers in a lead group with yellow jersey holder Alberto Contador and his Astana team-mate Andreas Klöden. An attempted breakaway by Contador succeeded only in dropping Klöden, and the leading trio continued to extend their lead over Col de la Colombière to the finish line, where the older Schleck brother, Fränk, was allowed to take the stage win. Lance Armstrong and Vincenzo Nibali overtook Klöden in the closing kilometre, finishing more than two minutes behind the first three finishers, who took the top three places in the overall classification.

Stage 17 result

Rank	Rider	Team	Time
1	Fränk Schleck (LUX)	Team Saxo Bank	4h 53' 54"
2	Alberto Contador (ESP)	Astana	s.t.
3	Andy Schleck (LUX)	Team Saxo Bank	s.t.
4	Vincenzo Nibali (ITA)	Liquigas	+ 2' 18"
DSQ	~~Lance Armstrong (USA)~~	~~Astana~~	~~s.t.~~
5	Andreas Klöden (GER)	Astana	+ 2' 27"
6	Bradley Wiggins (GBR)	Garmin–Slipstream	+ 3' 07"
7	Christophe Moreau (FRA)	Agritubel	+ 4' 09"
8	Christian Vande Velde (USA)	Garmin–Slipstream	s.t.
9	Rémi Pauriol (FRA)	Cofidis	+ 6' 10"

General classification after stage 17

Rank	Rider	Team	Time
1	Alberto Contador (ESP)	Astana	72h 27' 09"
2	Andy Schleck (LUX)	Team Saxo Bank	+ 2' 26"
3	Fränk Schleck (LUX)	Team Saxo Bank	+ 3' 25"
DSQ	~~Lance Armstrong (USA)~~	~~Astana~~	~~+ 3' 55"~~
5	Andreas Klöden (GER)	Astana	+ 4' 44"
6	Bradley Wiggins (GBR)	Garmin–Slipstream	+ 4' 53"
7	Vincenzo Nibali (ITA)	Liquigas	+ 5' 09"
8	Christian Vande Velde (USA)	Garmin–Slipstream	+ 8' 08"
9	Christophe Le Mével (FRA)	Française des Jeux	+ 9' 19"
DSQ	~~Mikel Astarloza (ESP)~~	~~Euskaltel–Euskadi~~	~~+ 10' 50"~~

=== Stage 18 ===
23 July 2009 – Annecy, 40 km (ITT)

The final time trial was held earlier in the race than is usual, and was not, as it had been for many years previously, the last stage which is competitive in terms of the overall classification. It followed a 40.5 km route around Lake Annecy, on a course that was mainly flat. A 270 m hill approximately ¾ around the course of 5% gradient would assist strong climbers in finishing closer to the typical TT specialists.

The riders set off in reverse order of their standing in the general classification, and the 19th rider to start, Mikhail Ignatiev set fastest times at all the intermediate checkpoints, and at the finish, that stood until Olympic time trial champion Fabian Cancellara, starting 58 riders later, bettered his times at the last checkpoint and, more importantly, at the finish line. Cancellara's finishing time, and Ignatiev's intermediate times were unchallenged until the last few riders were on the course, by which time there had been a rain shower and the wind speed had increased. Both Bradley Wiggins and Alberto Contador beat Cancellara's times at the top of the climb, and the earlier checkpoints, but lost time relative to the Swiss rider over the last part of the course. Wiggins lost 55 seconds to Cancellara in the last 12 km, and ended sixth on the stage, while Contador lost 49 seconds to him over the same distance, but still retained a three-second advantage to win the stage.

Andy Schleck conceded 1'45" to Contador in coming 21st on the stage, but retained his second place overall, while Lance Armstrong, 16th on the stage, moved up to third overall, with an 11-second advantage over Wiggins.

Stage 18 result

Rank	Rider	Team	Time
1	Alberto Contador (ESP)	Astana	48' 30"
2	Fabian Cancellara (SUI)	Team Saxo Bank	+ 3"
3	Mikhail Ignatiev (RUS)	Team Katusha	+ 15"
4	Gustav Larsson (SWE)	Team Saxo Bank	+ 33"
5	David Millar (GBR)	Garmin–Slipstream	+ 41"
6	Bradley Wiggins (GBR)	Garmin–Slipstream	+ 43"
7	Luis León Sánchez (ESP)	Caisse d'Epargne	+ 44"
8	Christophe Moreau (FRA)	Agritubel	+ 45"
9	Andreas Klöden (GER)	Astana	+ 54"
10	David Zabriskie (USA)	Garmin–Slipstream	+ 1' 02"

General classification after stage 18

Rank	Rider	Team	Time
1	Alberto Contador (ESP)	Astana	73h 15' 39"
2	Andy Schleck (LUX)	Team Saxo Bank	+ 4' 11"
DSQ	~~Lance Armstrong (USA)~~	~~Astana~~	~~+ 5' 25"~~
4	Bradley Wiggins (GBR)	Garmin–Slipstream	+ 5' 36"
5	Andreas Klöden (GER)	Astana	+ 5' 38"
6	Fränk Schleck (LUX)	Team Saxo Bank	+ 5' 59"
7	Vincenzo Nibali (ITA)	Liquigas	+ 7' 15"
8	Christian Vande Velde (USA)	Garmin–Slipstream	+ 10' 08"
DSQ	~~Mikel Astarloza (ESP)~~	~~Euskaltel–Euskadi~~	~~+ 12' 38"~~
10	Christophe Le Mével (FRA)	Française des Jeux	+ 12' 41"

=== Stage 19 ===
24 July 2009 – Bourgoin-Jallieu to Aubenas, 195 km

This was a largely flat stage, but featured a category 2 climb 16 km from the finish. A twenty-rider breakaway after 9 km never gained more than three minutes advantage over a peloton paced by Team Milram and Rabobank, and an attack by Leonardo Duque after 110 km reduced the group to five, his companions being José Luis Arrieta, Iván Gutiérrez, David Millar and Yaroslav Popovych. This smaller group stayed away from a chase group of about 40 riders that included all but one of the top 20 in the general classification, and some of the top sprinters in the race, for a further 35 km, but were caught before the final climb started in earnest. Near the top of that climb, Laurent Lefèvre and world champion Alessandro Ballan attempted a breakaway, but they were chased down by Team Columbia–HTC, whose sprinter Mark Cavendish again took the stage victory. A split in the group as it crossed the line meant that Lance Armstrong gained four seconds over the rest of the contenders for a place on the final podium in Paris.

Stage 19 result

Rank	Rider	Team	Time
1	Mark Cavendish (GBR)	Team Columbia–HTC	3h 50' 35"
2	Thor Hushovd (NOR)	Cervélo TestTeam	s.t.
3	Gerald Ciolek (GER)	Team Milram	s.t.
4	Greg Van Avermaet (BEL)	Silence–Lotto	s.t.
5	Óscar Freire (ESP)	Rabobank	s.t.
6	Jérôme Pineau (FRA)	Quick-Step	s.t.
7	Fumiyuki Beppu (JPN)	Skil–Shimano	s.t.
8	Nicolas Roche (IRL)	Ag2r–La Mondiale	s.t.
9	Christophe Le Mével (FRA)	Française des Jeux	s.t.
10	Martijn Maaskant (NED)	Garmin–Slipstream	s.t.

General classification after stage 19

Rank	Rider	Team	Time
1	Alberto Contador (ESP)	Astana	77h 06' 18"
2	Andy Schleck (LUX)	Team Saxo Bank	+ 4' 11"
DSQ	~~Lance Armstrong (USA)~~	~~Astana~~	~~+ 5' 21"~~
3	Bradley Wiggins (GBR)	Garmin–Slipstream	+ 5' 36"
4	Andreas Klöden (GER)	Astana	+ 5' 38"
5	Fränk Schleck (LUX)	Team Saxo Bank	+ 5' 59"
6	Vincenzo Nibali (ITA)	Liquigas	+ 7' 15"
7	Christian Vande Velde (USA)	Garmin–Slipstream	+ 10' 08"
8	Christophe Le Mével (FRA)	Française des Jeux	+ 12' 37"
DSQ	~~Mikel Astarloza (ESP)~~	~~Euskaltel–Euskadi~~	+ 12' 38"

=== Stage 20 ===
25 July 2009 – Montélimar to Mont Ventoux, 167 km

This was the first time the Tour had had a mountain stage on its second-to-last day. The early stages, which included four categorised climbs, saw a group of 16 riders build a lead in excess of 10'30" before Team Saxo Bank started to limit their gains. Under pressure from Astana, the chase group was reduced to 24 men, including the top 12 in the overall standings, when it reached the bottom of the final climb of the tour 4'05" behind the leaders. Juan Manuel Gárate triggered the disintegration of the lead group by attacking on the lower slopes, with only Tony Martin able to stay with him for long. The yellow jersey group passed many of the members of the earlier escape as it climbed, but the seven riders who had any ambition of comprising the top three in Paris remained together for most of the climb. Andy Schleck attempted a number of attacks, but as they neither allowed him to escape from Alberto Contador, nor assisted Fränk Schleck to move clear of Lance Armstrong in his ambition to gain third place overall, he did not persist with them. Franco Pellizotti, who already had an unassailable lead in the King of the Mountains category, caught and passed the yellow jersey group in pursuit of Martin and Gárate. Among the elite group, which had been joined by Roman Kreuziger in a bid to get into the top ten in general classification, the first to lose contact was Andreas Klöden, and with 2 km remaining Bradley Wiggins became detached from the group. Gárate attacked Martin twice in the closing stages, and although the German was able to catch-up twice, the Spaniard moved clear in the last 200m to win the stage. Pellizotti was caught by the yellow jersey group in the last 200m, and although Armstrong increased his lead over Wiggins, Fränk Schleck's margin over the British rider at the line was not enough to overtake him for fourth place overall.

Stage 20 result

Rank	Rider	Team	Time
1	Juan Manuel Gárate (ESP)	Rabobank	4h 39' 21"
2	Tony Martin (GER)	Team Columbia–HTC	+ 3"
3	Andy Schleck (LUX)	Team Saxo Bank	+ 38"
4	Alberto Contador (ESP)	Astana	s.t.
DSQ	~~Lance Armstrong (USA)~~	~~Astana~~	~~+ 41"~~
5	Fränk Schleck (LUX)	Team Saxo Bank	+ 43"
6	Roman Kreuziger (CZE)	Liquigas	+ 46"
DSQ	~~Franco Pellizotti (ITA)~~	~~Liquigas~~	~~+ 56"~~
7	Vincenzo Nibali (ITA)	Liquigas	+ 58"
8	Bradley Wiggins (GBR)	Garmin–Slipstream	+ 1' 03"

General classification after stage 20

Rank	Rider	Team	Time
1	Alberto Contador (ESP)	Astana	81h 46' 17"
2	Andy Schleck (LUX)	Team Saxo Bank	+ 4' 11"
DSQ	~~Lance Armstrong (USA)~~	~~Astana~~	~~+ 5' 24"~~
4	Bradley Wiggins (GBR)	Garmin–Slipstream	+ 6' 01"
5	Fränk Schleck (LUX)	Team Saxo Bank	+ 6' 04"
6	Andreas Klöden (GER)	Astana	+ 6' 42"
7	Vincenzo Nibali (ITA)	Liquigas	+ 7' 35"
8	Christian Vande Velde (USA)	Garmin–Slipstream	+ 12' 04"
9	Roman Kreuziger (CZE)	Liquigas	+ 14' 16"
10	Christophe Le Mével (FRA)	Française des Jeux	+ 14' 25"

=== Stage 21 ===
26 July 2009 – Montereau-Fault-Yonne to Paris Champs-Élysées, 160 km

The 2009 Tour ended, as it had for the previous 34 years, on the Champs-Élysées. The pace was casual in the early part of the stage, marked more by photo opportunities for the category leaders, but the pace increased once the race reached central Paris. On the first of seven circuits of the Champs-Élysées, a seven rider escape moved clear, consisting of Jussi Veikkanen, Arnaud Coyot, Samuel Dumoulin, Alexandre Pichot, Carlos Barredo, Fabian Wegmann and Fumiyuki Beppu. The breakaway nullified the intermediate sprints as part of the only unresolved contest, the green jersey category. The last three escapees, Veikkanen, Wegmann and Beppu, were caught shortly after the start of the last circuit. Although the Garmin–Slipstream team attempted to get ahead of the Team Columbia–HTC lead out, Mark Cavendish won the sprint, his sixth stage of the Tour, with several metres to spare, with his lead-out man Mark Renshaw second. Thor Hushovd, by finishing sixth, took enough points to secure the points competition, and the other riders finished in the group to confirm their positions and awards.

Stage 21 result

Rank	Rider	Team	Time
1	Mark Cavendish (GBR)	Team Columbia–HTC	4h 02' 18"
2	Mark Renshaw (AUS)	Team Columbia–HTC	s.t.
3	Tyler Farrar (USA)	Garmin–Slipstream	s.t.
4	Gerald Ciolek (GER)	Team Milram	s.t.
5	Yauheni Hutarovich (BLR)	Française des Jeux	s.t.
6	Thor Hushovd (NOR)	Cervélo TestTeam	s.t.
7	José Joaquín Rojas (ESP)	Caisse d'Epargne	s.t.
8	Marco Bandiera (ITA)	Lampre–NGC	s.t.
9	Daniele Bennati (ITA)	Liquigas	s.t.
10	William Bonnet (FRA)	Bbox Bouygues Telecom	s.t.

Final general classification

Rank	Rider	Team	Time
1	Alberto Contador (ESP)	Astana	85h 48' 35"
2	Andy Schleck (LUX)	Team Saxo Bank	+ 4' 11"
DSQ	~~Lance Armstrong (USA)~~	~~Astana~~	~~+ 5' 24"~~
3	Bradley Wiggins (GBR)	Garmin–Slipstream	+ 6' 01"
4	Fränk Schleck (LUX)	Team Saxo Bank	+ 6' 04"
5	Andreas Klöden (GER)	Astana	+ 6' 42"
6	Vincenzo Nibali (ITA)	Liquigas	+ 7' 35"
7	Christian Vande Velde (USA)	Garmin–Slipstream	+ 12' 04"
8	Roman Kreuziger (CZE)	Liquigas	+ 14' 16"
9	Christophe Le Mével (FRA)	Française des Jeux	+ 14' 25"
