= 2009 Tour de France, Stage 1 to Stage 11 =

Cycling race stages

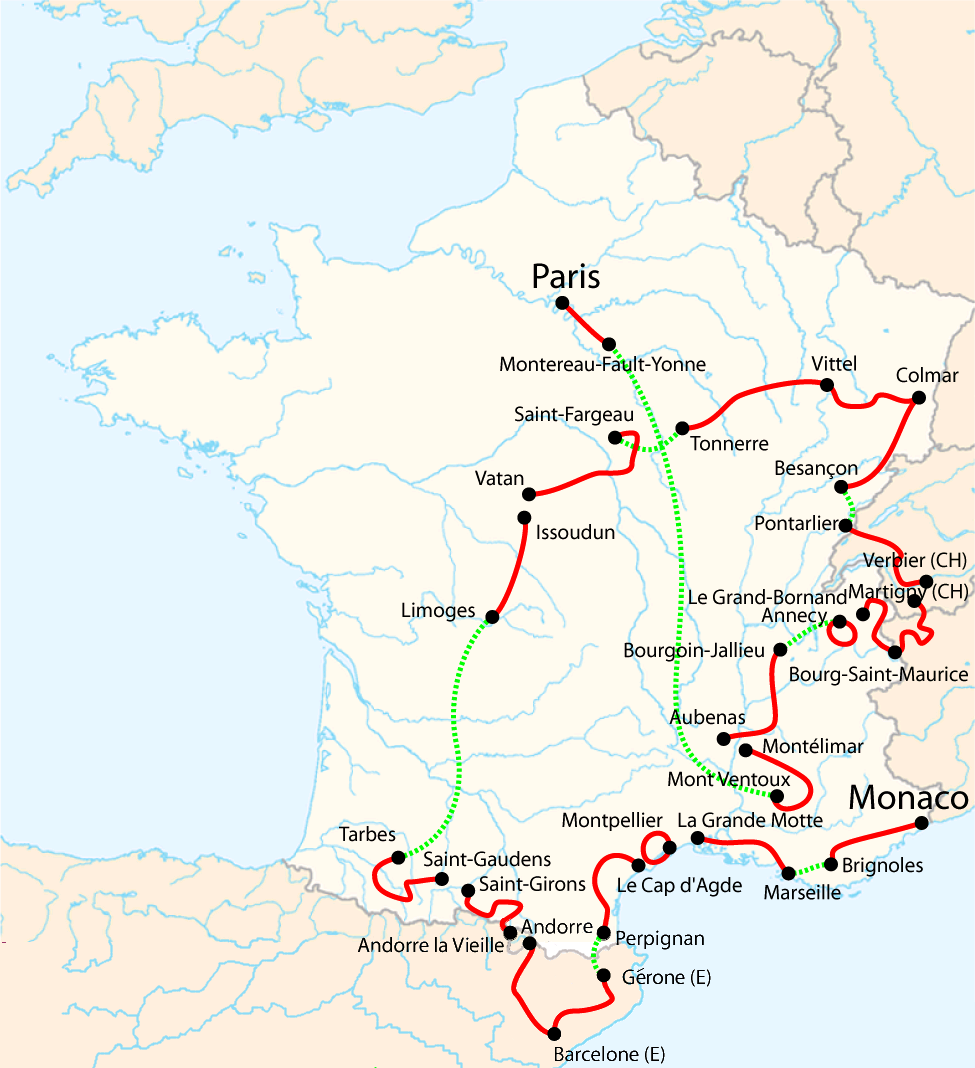
Overview of the stages

These are the individual stages of the 2009 Tour de France, with Stage 1 on July 4 and Stage 11 on July 15.

== Stages ==
=== Stage 1 ===
4 July 2009 — Monaco, 15.5 km (ITT)

The 2009 Tour began, as have many in the past, with an individual time trial, but instead of a very brief prologue, this 15 kilometer ride saw the race's overall favorites show themselves on day one. The favourite for the stage, Fabian Cancellara, won with Alberto Contador coming in second. Time-trial specialist Bradley Wiggins came third.

Stage 1 result

Rank	Rider	Team	Time
1	Fabian Cancellara (SUI)	Team Saxo Bank	19' 33"
2	Alberto Contador (ESP)	Astana	+ 18"
3	Bradley Wiggins (GBR)	Garmin–Slipstream	+ 19"
4	Andreas Klöden (GER)	Astana	+ 22"
5	Cadel Evans (AUS)	Silence–Lotto	+ 23"
6	Levi Leipheimer (USA)	Astana	+ 30"
7	Roman Kreuziger (CZE)	Liquigas	+ 32"
8	Tony Martin (GER)	Team Columbia–HTC	+ 33"
9	Vincenzo Nibali (ITA)	Liquigas	+ 37"
DSQ	~~Lance Armstrong (USA)~~	~~Astana~~	~~+ 40"~~

General classification after stage 1

Rank	Rider	Team	Time
1	Fabian Cancellara (SUI)	Team Saxo Bank	19' 33"
2	Alberto Contador (ESP)	Astana	+ 18"
3	Bradley Wiggins (GBR)	Garmin–Slipstream	+ 19"
4	Andreas Klöden (GER)	Astana	+ 22"
5	Cadel Evans (AUS)	Silence–Lotto	+ 23"
6	Levi Leipheimer (USA)	Astana	+ 30"
7	Roman Kreuziger (CZE)	Liquigas	+ 32"
8	Tony Martin (GER)	Team Columbia–HTC	+ 33"
9	Vincenzo Nibali (ITA)	Liquigas	+ 37"
DSQ	~~Lance Armstrong (USA)~~	~~Astana~~	~~+ 40"~~

=== Stage 2 ===
Stage 2 riding profile

5 July 2009 — Monaco to Brignoles, 182 km

This stage was largely flat, but had one third category, and three fourth category, climbs in its first 129 km, and most of the last 15 km was downhill. A four-man breakaway (Stéphane Augé, Stef Clement, Cyril Dessel and Jussi Veikkanen) held a maximum advantage of some 5 minutes, but they were caught with 10 km remaining, initially by Mikhail Ignatiev, and shortly after by the rest of the peloton. Ignatiev was caught with 5 km left, and some of the cyclists shaping to contest the sprint were disrupted by a crash and a missed turn in the last kilometre, allowing Mark Cavendish a clear win.

Stage 2 result

Rank	Rider	Team	Time
1	Mark Cavendish (GBR)	Team Columbia–HTC	4h 30' 02"
2	Tyler Farrar (USA)	Garmin–Slipstream	s.t.
3	Romain Feillu (FRA)	Agritubel	s.t.
4	Thor Hushovd (NOR)	Cervélo TestTeam	s.t.
5	Yukiya Arashiro (JPN)	Bbox Bouygues Telecom	s.t.
6	Gerald Ciolek (GER)	Garmin–Slipstream	s.t.
7	William Bonnet (FRA)	Bbox Bouygues Telecom	s.t.
8	Nicolas Roche (IRL)	Ag2r–La Mondiale	s.t.
9	Koen de Kort (NED)	Skil–Shimano	s.t.
10	Lloyd Mondory (FRA)	Ag2r–La Mondiale	s.t.

General classification after stage 2

Rank	Rider	Team	Time
1	Fabian Cancellara (SUI)	Team Saxo Bank	4h 49' 34"
2	Alberto Contador (ESP)	Astana	+ 18"
3	Bradley Wiggins (GBR)	Garmin–Slipstream	+ 19"
4	Andreas Klöden (GER)	Astana	+ 22"
5	Cadel Evans (AUS)	Silence–Lotto	+ 23"
6	Levi Leipheimer (USA)	Astana	+ 30"
7	Roman Kreuziger (CZE)	Liquigas	+ 32"
8	Tony Martin (GER)	Team Columbia–HTC	+ 33"
9	Vincenzo Nibali (ITA)	Liquigas	+ 37"
10	~~Lance Armstrong (USA)~~	~~Astana~~	~~+ 40"~~

=== Stage 3 ===
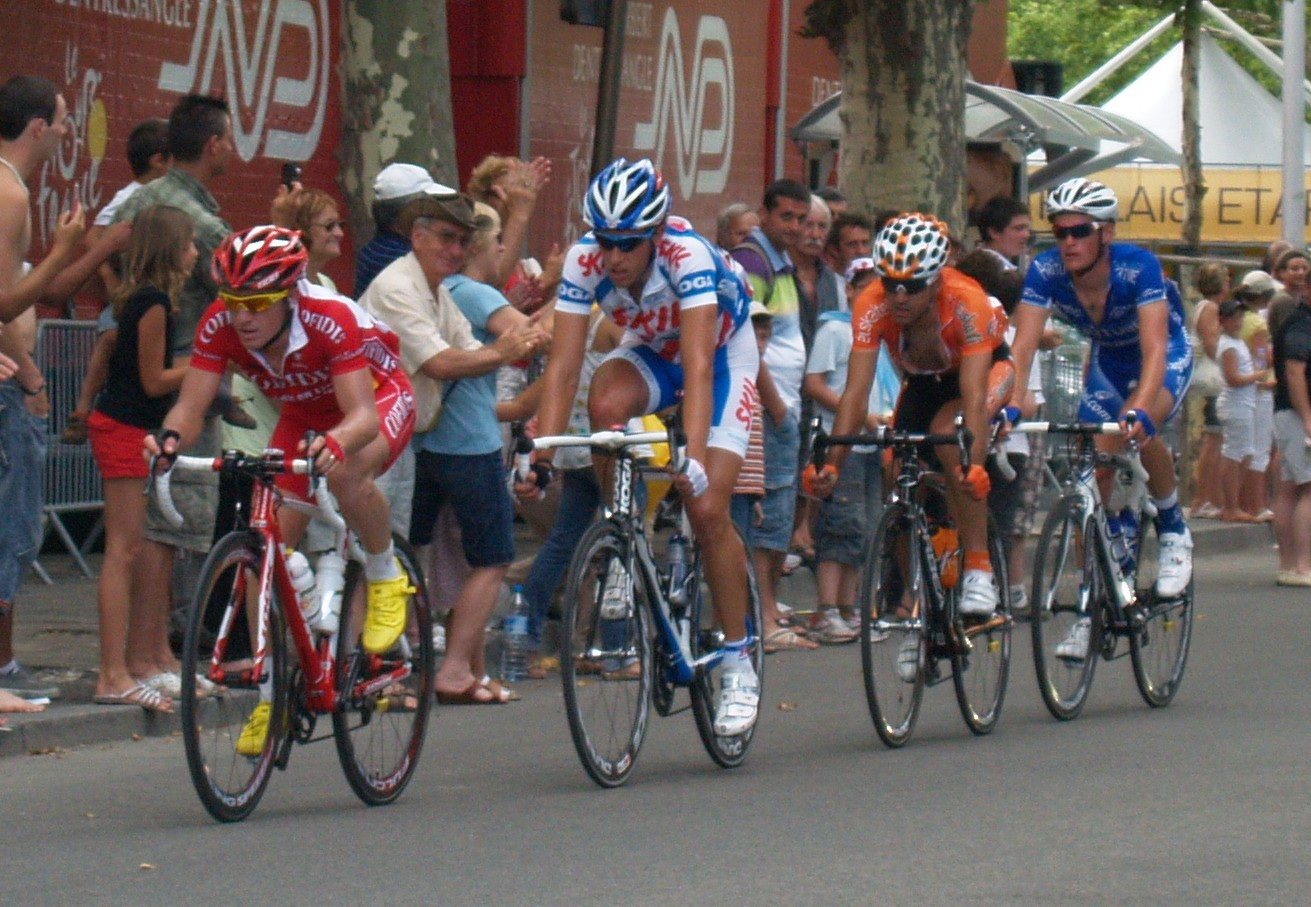
Stage 3: Samuel Dumoulin, Koen de Kort, Rubén Pérez and Maxime Bouet in Arles

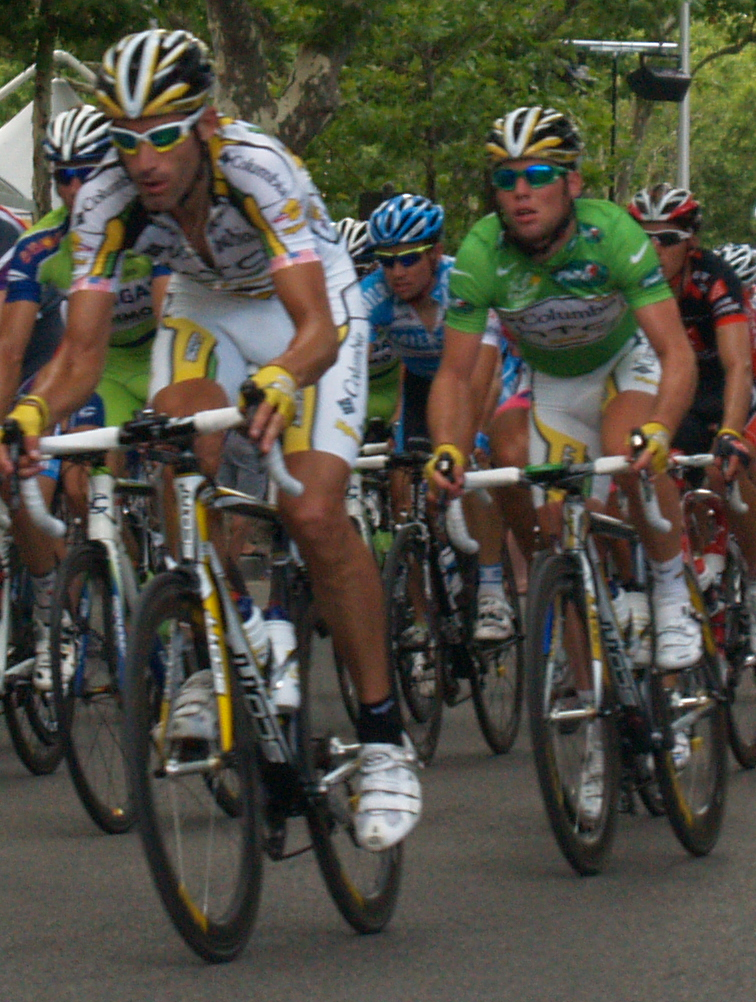
George Hincapie and Mark Cavendish in the green jersey

6 July 2009 — Marseille to La Grande-Motte, 196 km Stage 3 was another flat stage, with a finish on the waterfront at La Grande-Motte. Like in stage 2, a four-man breakaway formed, this time consisting of Maxime Bouet, Koen de Kort, Samuel Dumoulin and Rubén Pérez. They held a maximum advantage of about 13 minutes and were caught with a little less than 30 kilometres to go by a first group who had separated themselves from the rest of the peloton as a result of accelerating in the presence of strong winds near the coastline. The group contained 28 riders, including leader Fabian Cancellara, 7-time winner Lance Armstrong and the whole Team Columbia–HTC. After a sprint, Mark Cavendish finished first. Several of the favorites and riders classified in the top 10, such as Alberto Contador, Cadel Evans, Carlos Sastre, the Schleck brothers, Levi Leipheimer and Bradley Wiggins, were not present in this group and were 41 seconds behind at the finish.

Stage 3 result

Rank	Rider	Team	Time
1	Mark Cavendish (GBR)	Team Columbia–HTC	5h 01' 24"
2	Thor Hushovd (NOR)	Cervélo TestTeam	s.t.
3	Cyril Lemoine (FRA)	Skil–Shimano	s.t.
4	Samuel Dumoulin (FRA)	Cofidis	s.t.
5	Jérôme Pineau (FRA)	Quick-Step	s.t.
6	Fabian Cancellara (SUI)	Team Saxo Bank	s.t.
7	Fabian Wegmann (GER)	Team Milram	s.t.
8	Fumiyuki Beppu (JPN)	Skil–Shimano	s.t.
9	Maxime Bouet (FRA)	Agritubel	s.t.
10	Linus Gerdemann (GER)	Team Milram	s.t.

General classification after stage 3

Rank	Rider	Team	Time
1	Fabian Cancellara (SUI)	Team Saxo Bank	9h 50' 58"
2	Tony Martin (GER)	Team Columbia–HTC	+ 33"
DSQ	~~Lance Armstrong (USA)~~	~~Astana~~	~~+ 40"~~
4	Alberto Contador (ESP)	Astana	+ 59"
5	Bradley Wiggins (GBR)	Garmin–Slipstream	+ 1' 00"
6	Andreas Klöden (GER)	Astana	+ 1' 03"
7	Linus Gerdemann (GER)	Team Milram	+ 1' 03"
8	Cadel Evans (AUS)	Silence–Lotto	+ 1' 04"
9	Maxime Monfort (BEL)	Team Columbia–HTC	+ 1' 10"
10	Levi Leipheimer (USA)	Astana	+ 1' 11"

=== Stage 4 ===
7 July 2009 — Montpellier, 38 km (TTT)

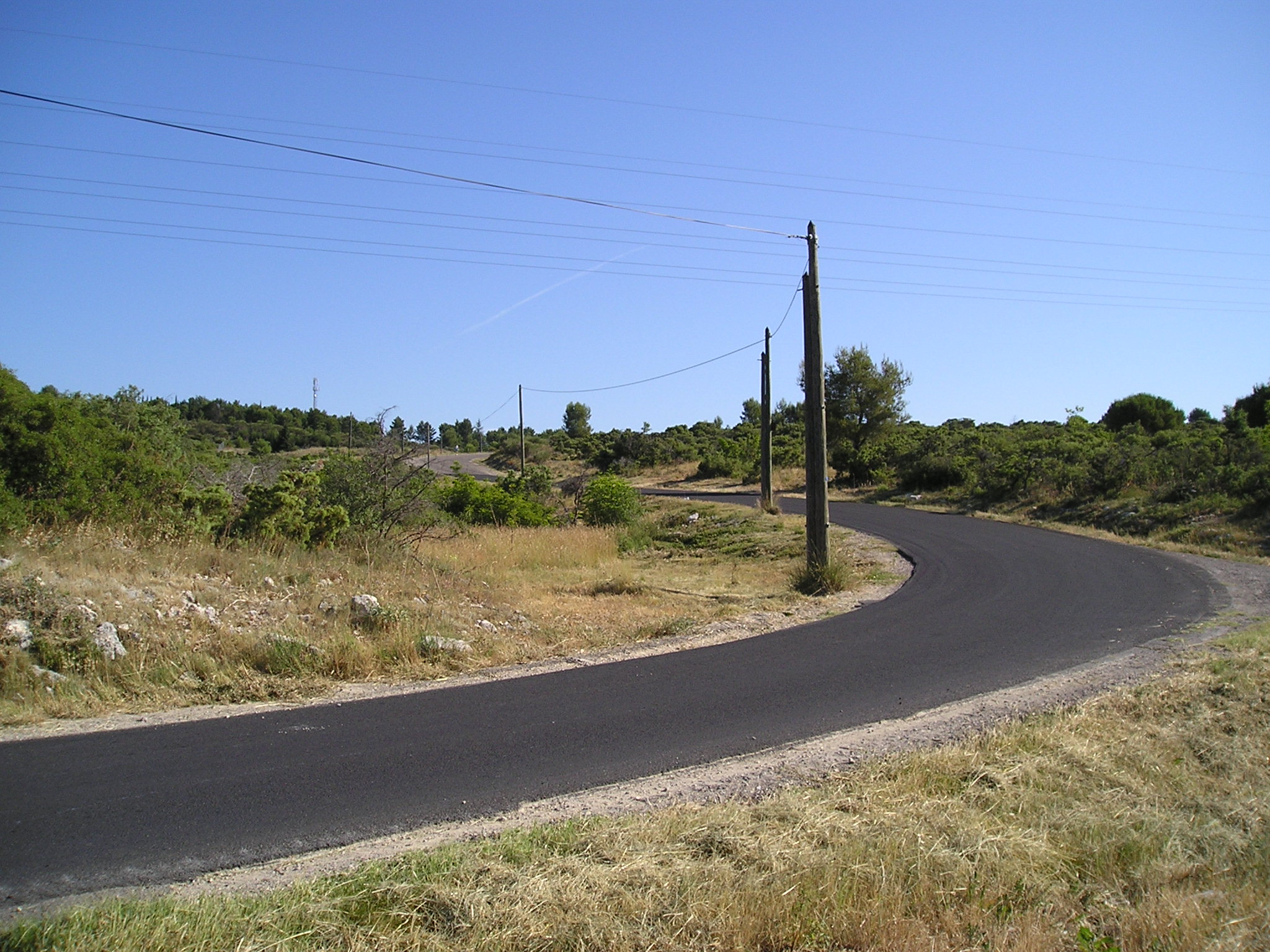
Between the time points of Grabels and Murviel-lès-Montpellier, kilometer 17, the right curb where the four riders of Bbox Bouygues Telecom and Piet Rooijakkers exited the road.

This was the first team time trial in the Tour since 2005. Riders finishing with the first five members of their team all received the same time: riders who became isolated from their team recorded an individual time. The time trial was won by Astana, beating Garmin–Slipstream, who rode about half the race with only 5 riders left, by 18 seconds. Fabian Cancellara and Team Saxo Bank took 40 seconds longer than Astana, Cancellara thus having the same overall time as Lance Armstrong but retaining the yellow jersey by virtue of the fractions of a second recorded in the opening time trial.

After the race, some riders complained that the course was too dangerous and that this course was unworthy of a major race like this. During the race several riders had indeed crashed, amongst them Denis Menchov, Alessandro Ballan, Bingen Fernández, Jurgen Van den Broeck, 4 riders of Bbox Bouygues Telecom and also Piet Rooijakkers. Rooijakkers fractured his arm and was rushed off to a hospital, ending his tour.

Stage 4 result

Rank	Team	Time
1	Astana	46' 29"
2	Garmin–Slipstream	+ 18"
3	Team Saxo Bank	+ 40"
4	Liquigas	+ 58"
5	Team Columbia–HTC	+ 59"
6	Team Katusha	+ 1' 23"
7	Caisse d'Epargne	+ 1' 29"
8	Cervélo TestTeam	+ 1' 37"
9	Ag2r–La Mondiale	+ 1' 48"
10	Euskaltel–Euskadi	+ 2' 09"

General classification after stage 4

Rank	Rider	Team	Time
1	Fabian Cancellara (SUI)	Team Saxo Bank	10h 38' 07"
DSQ	~~Lance Armstrong (USA)~~	~~Astana~~	~~+ 0"~~
3	Alberto Contador (ESP)	Astana	+ 19"
4	Andreas Klöden (GER)	Astana	+ 23"
5	Levi Leipheimer (USA)	Astana	+ 31"
6	Bradley Wiggins (GBR)	Garmin–Slipstream	+ 38"
7	Haimar Zubeldia (ESP)	Astana	+ 51"
8	Tony Martin (GER)	Team Columbia–HTC	+ 52"
9	David Zabriskie (USA)	Garmin–Slipstream	+ 1' 06"
10	David Millar (GBR)	Garmin–Slipstream	+ 1' 07"

=== Stage 5 ===
8 July 2009 — Le Cap d'Agde to Perpignan, 197 km

The Tour visited Cap d'Agde for only the second time ever, as the early Tour flat stages continued. Perpignan, on the other hand, is a traditional city for the Tour to visit, thought to symbolically indicate the Tour's entrance to (or exit from, in "counter-clockwise" years) the Pyrenees. A six rider breakaway, consisting of Anthony Geslin, Yauheni Hutarovich, Mikhail Ignatiev, Marcin Sapa, Albert Timmer and Thomas Voeckler, formed within the first kilometre, and achieved a maximum lead of more than nine and a half minutes. Attacks by Ignatiev in the last 10 km had reduced the escape group to four, until with 5 km Voeckler made what proved to be the decisive break. Ignatiev finished second just in front of Cavendish and the rest of the pack.

During the race, the peloton had split into several groups as a result of the wind, as had happened two days before. Among the absentees in the first group of the peloton were Denis Menchov and Tom Boonen, but they and their group managed to return to the main group after several kilometres of chasing. Robert Gesink, who had crashed just before the windy passage along the coastline started, eventually had to let the peloton go and finished more than nine minutes behind with what in the end proved to be a broken wrist.

Stage 5 result

Rank	Rider	Team	Time
1	Thomas Voeckler (FRA)	Bbox Bouygues Telecom	4h 29' 35"
2	Mikhail Ignatiev (RUS)	Team Katusha	+ 7"
3	Mark Cavendish (GBR)	Team Columbia–HTC	s.t.
4	Tyler Farrar (USA)	Garmin–Slipstream	s.t.
5	Gerald Ciolek (GER)	Team Milram	s.t.
6	Danilo Napolitano (ITA)	Team Katusha	s.t.
7	José Joaquín Rojas (ESP)	Caisse d'Epargne	s.t.
8	Lloyd Mondory (FRA)	Ag2r–La Mondiale	s.t.
9	Óscar Freire (ESP)	Rabobank	s.t.
10	Thor Hushovd (NOR)	Cervélo TestTeam	s.t.

General classification after stage 5

Rank	Rider	Team	Time
1	Fabian Cancellara (SUI)	Team Saxo Bank	15h 07' 49"
DSQ	~~Lance Armstrong (USA)~~	~~Astana~~	~~+ 0"~~
3	Alberto Contador (ESP)	Astana	+ 19"
4	Andreas Klöden (GER)	Astana	+ 23"
5	Levi Leipheimer (USA)	Astana	+ 31"
6	Bradley Wiggins (GBR)	Garmin–Slipstream	+ 38"
7	Haimar Zubeldia (ESP)	Astana	+ 51"
8	Tony Martin (GER)	Team Columbia–HTC	+ 52"
9	David Zabriskie (USA)	Garmin–Slipstream	+ 1' 06"
10	David Millar (GBR)	Garmin–Slipstream	+ 1' 07"

=== Stage 6 ===
9 July 2009 — Girona (Spain) to Barcelona (Spain), 175 km

This last flat stage before the 2009 Tour entered the Pyrenees took place entirely within Spain, on a course that is frequently used in the Tour of Catalonia. The main break of the day was instigated by David Millar after 46 km, and he was joined by Stéphane Augé, who took the King of the Mountains leadership, and Sylvain Chavanel, and eventually by Amets Txurruka. Millar, 10th at the beginning of the stage, was virtual leader of the tour for much of the day, as the lead extended to 3'45", and he attacked and left behind his fellow escapees with 29 km remaining. The uphill approach to the finish on Montjuïc did not suit some of the sprinters, but there was a group of about 60 at the head of the field when Millar was caught near the 1 km red flag, and with some GC contenders and climbers contesting the finish, Thor Hushovd emerged as stage winner. The day was marked by numerous rain showers, and a number of falls, with Michael Rogers the main overall contender to lose considerable time.

Stage 6 result

Rank	Rider	Team	Time
1	Thor Hushovd (NOR)	Cervélo TestTeam	4h 21' 33"
2	Óscar Freire (ESP)	Rabobank	s.t.
3	José Joaquín Rojas (ESP)	Caisse d'Epargne	s.t.
4	Gerald Ciolek (GER)	Team Milram	s.t.
DSQ	~~Franco Pellizotti (ITA)~~	~~Liquigas~~	~~s.t.~~
5	Filippo Pozzato (ITA)	Team Katusha	s.t.
6	Alessandro Ballan (ITA)	Lampre–NGC	s.t.
7	Rinaldo Nocentini (ITA)	Ag2r–La Mondiale	s.t.
8	Cadel Evans (AUS)	Silence–Lotto	s.t.
9	Fabian Cancellara (SUI)	Team Saxo Bank	s.t.

General classification after stage 6

Rank	Rider	Team	Time
1	Fabian Cancellara (SUI)	Team Saxo Bank	19h 29' 22"
DSQ	~~Lance Armstrong (USA)~~	~~Astana~~	~~+ 0"~~
3	Alberto Contador (ESP)	Astana	+ 19"
4	Andreas Klöden (GER)	Astana	+ 23"
5	Levi Leipheimer (USA)	Astana	+ 31"
6	Bradley Wiggins (GBR)	Garmin–Slipstream	+ 38"
7	Tony Martin (GER)	Team Columbia–HTC	+ 52"
8	Christian Vande Velde (USA)	Garmin–Slipstream	+ 1' 16"
9	Gustav Larsson (SWE)	Team Saxo Bank	+ 1' 22"
10	Maxime Monfort (BEL)	Team Columbia–HTC	+ 1' 29"

=== Stage 7 ===
10 July 2009 — Barcelona (Spain) to Andorra-Arcalis (Andorra)- 224 km

This second stage in a row that did not visit French soil was both the longest stage, and the highest finish of this year's tour. The first key break of the day comprised three riders, and escaped after 8 km of cycling, but it was joined by a six-man chase group shortly after the first of the day's minor climbs, but this was the day on which the race reached the high mountains. The escapees stretched their advantage to more than 14 minutes before reaching the major climbs, but as they included Rinaldo Nocentini, who was 32nd in the general classification and only 3'13" behind the yellow jersey, the peloton, driven by the Astana squad, made a chase. Although the lead was greatly reduced, all but one of the escapees finished before the elite riders, and Nocentini retained a big enough advantage to take over the race leadership. Brice Feillu attacked the other four escapees who were at the head of the field with 5.5 km remaining, and stayed away to claim his first professional win in his first Tour de France. After an attempted attack on the other contenders for the Tour victory by Cadel Evans, 2007 winner Alberto Contador made a successful attack on the elite group with 3 km to go, beating them to the line by 21 seconds, and taking second place overall, while after five days in the yellow jersey, Cancellara finished more than nine minutes behind the stage winner, having been dropped on the final climb.

Stage 7 result

Rank	Rider	Team	Time
1	Brice Feillu (FRA)	Agritubel	6h 11' 31"
2	Christophe Kern (FRA)	Cofidis	+ 5"
3	Johannes Fröhlinger (GER)	Team Milram	+ 25"
4	Rinaldo Nocentini (ITA)	Ag2r–La Mondiale	+ 26"
5	Egoi Martínez (ESP)	Euskaltel–Euskadi	+ 45"
6	Christophe Riblon (FRA)	Ag2r–La Mondiale	+ 1' 05"
7	Jérôme Pineau (FRA)	Quick-Step	+ 2' 32"
8	Iván Gutiérrez (ESP)	Caisse d'Epargne	+ 3' 14"
9	Alberto Contador (ESP)	Astana	+ 3' 26"
10	Cadel Evans (AUS)	Silence–Lotto	+ 3' 47"

General classification after stage 7

Rank	Rider	Team	Time
1	Rinaldo Nocentini (ITA)	Ag2r–La Mondiale	25h 44' 32"
2	Alberto Contador (ESP)	Astana	+ 6"
DSQ	~~Lance Armstrong (USA)~~	~~Astana~~	~~+ 8"~~
4	Levi Leipheimer (USA)	Astana	+ 39"
5	Bradley Wiggins (GBR)	Garmin–Slipstream	+ 46"
6	Andreas Klöden (GER)	Astana	+ 54"
7	Tony Martin (GER)	Team Columbia–HTC	+ 1' 00"
8	Christian Vande Velde (USA)	Garmin–Slipstream	+ 1' 24"
9	Andy Schleck (LUX)	Team Saxo Bank	+ 1' 49"
10	Vincenzo Nibali (ITA)	Liquigas	+ 1' 54"

=== Stage 8 ===
11 July 2009 — Andorra la Vella (Andorra) to Saint-Girons, 176 km

The Tour returned to France in the second of three Pyrenean stages, which featured three categorized climbs, including the imposing Port d'Envalira at just over 2,400 meters, before a steep descent. A number of early breakaways, including one featuring Cadel Evans, and one that enabled Thor Hushovd to take sufficient points in intermediate sprints to claim the green jersey, came to nothing, and by the top of the final climb three riders, Mikel Astarloza (later suspended for EPO use), Vladimir Efimkin and Luis León Sánchez, were at the front of the race, with an array of chasers and struggling former members of breakaways between them and a group that included all the GC contenders and the yellow jersey wearer, Nocentini, who was part of a group, also including Denis Menchov, that had recovered a 30-second deficit on the elite group shortly before the top of the climb. Meanwhile, Caisse d'Epargne leader and 2006 Tour winner, Óscar Pereiro, became the highest profile rider to abandon the race. On the 42 km descent, Sandy Casar caught the three leaders, and this group of four maintained a comfortable lead over the peloton, and the race among these riders was triggered when Efimkin broke clear with 4 km remaining, a move that at one stage looked as though it might succeed, but he was caught by the other three escapees just before the red kite, and Sánchez won the sprint from Casar. There was no change to the position of the race favorites.

Stage 8 result

Rank	Rider	Team	Time
1	Luis León Sánchez (ESP)	Caisse d'Epargne	4h 31' 50"
2	Sandy Casar (FRA)	Française des Jeux	s.t.
DSQ	~~Mikel Astarloza (ESP)~~	~~Euskaltel–Euskadi~~	~~s.t.~~
3	Vladimir Efimkin (RUS)	Ag2r–La Mondiale	+ 3"
4	José Joaquín Rojas (ESP)	Caisse d'Epargne	+ 1' 54"
5	Christophe Riblon (FRA)	Ag2r–La Mondiale	s.t.
6	Peter Velits (SVK)	Team Milram	s.t.
7	Sébastien Minard (FRA)	Cofidis	s.t.
8	Jérémy Roy (FRA)	Française des Jeux	s.t.
9	Thomas Voeckler (FRA)	Bbox Bouygues Telecom	s.t.

General classification after stage 8

Rank	Rider	Team	Time
1	Rinaldo Nocentini (ITA)	Ag2r–La Mondiale	30h 18' 16"
2	Alberto Contador (ESP)	Astana	+ 6"
DSQ	~~Lance Armstrong (USA)~~	~~Astana~~	~~+ 8"~~
4	Levi Leipheimer (USA)	Astana	+ 39"
5	Bradley Wiggins (GBR)	Garmin–Slipstream	+ 46"
6	Andreas Klöden (GER)	Astana	+ 54"
7	Tony Martin (GER)	Team Columbia–HTC	+ 1' 00"
8	Christian Vande Velde (USA)	Garmin–Slipstream	+ 1' 24"
9	Andy Schleck (LUX)	Team Saxo Bank	+ 1' 49"
10	Vincenzo Nibali (ITA)	Liquigas	+ 1' 54"

=== Stage 9 ===
12 July 2009 — Saint-Gaudens to Tarbes, 160 km

The Pyrenees portion of the 2009 Tour ended with this stage which had two categorized climbs, the Col d'Aspin and the Col de Tourmalet and, as the previous day, a lengthy flat stretch before the finish, essentially neutralising the stage in terms of challenges relevant to the overall classification. An early break of twelve riders became thirteen after extensive effort by the Liquigas squad to get Franco Pellizotti across the divide. After not much more than half an hour, the escape group was reduced to four: Pellizotti, Jens Voigt, Pierrick Fédrigo and Leonardo Duque, who was dropped on the climb of the Col d'Apsin, while a chase group of 9 riders formed behind, including Egoi Martínez, who was to gain enough points over the cols to take the polkadot jersey at the end of the day. By the top of that mountain, the leading trio held an advantage of 2'45 over the counter-attack and 3'30 over the peloton; at the top of the Tourmalet only Pellizotti and Fédrigo remained at the front, with seven surviving chasers at 2'40 and the peloton at 5'05. The descent and flat run in saw all the escapees except the two leaders reeled in, as Rabobank and Caisse d'Epargne sought to engineer an opportunity for their sprinters, but Pellizotti and Fédrigo held on to contest the stage win between themselves, the Frenchman emerging as victor.

Stage 9 result

Rank	Rider	Team	Time
1	Pierrick Fédrigo (FRA)	Bbox Bouygues Telecom	4h 05' 31"
DSQ	~~Franco Pellizotti (ITA)~~	~~Liquigas~~	~~s.t.~~
2	Óscar Freire (ESP)	Rabobank	+ 34"
3	Serguei Ivanov (RUS)	Team Katusha	s.t.
4	Peter Velits (SVK)	Team Milram	s.t.
5	José Joaquín Rojas (ESP)	Caisse d'Epargne	s.t.
6	Greg Van Avermaet (BEL)	Silence–Lotto	s.t.
7	Geoffroy Lequatre (FRA)	Agritubel	s.t.
8	Alessandro Ballan (ITA)	Lampre–NGC	s.t.
9	Nicolas Roche (IRL)	Ag2r–La Mondiale	s.t.

General classification after stage 9

Rank	Rider	Team	Time
1	Rinaldo Nocentini (ITA)	Ag2r–La Mondiale	34h 24' 21"
2	Alberto Contador (ESP)	Astana	+ 6"
DSQ	~~Lance Armstrong (USA)~~	~~Astana~~	~~+ 8"~~
4	Levi Leipheimer (USA)	Astana	+ 39"
5	Bradley Wiggins (GBR)	Garmin–Slipstream	+ 46"
6	Andreas Klöden (GER)	Astana	+ 54"
7	Tony Martin (GER)	Team Columbia–HTC	+ 1' 00"
8	Christian Vande Velde (USA)	Garmin–Slipstream	+ 1' 24"
9	Andy Schleck (LUX)	Team Saxo Bank	+ 1' 49"
10	Vincenzo Nibali (ITA)	Liquigas	+ 1' 54"

=== Rest day ===
13 July 2009 — Limoges

After a lengthy transfer, the rest day was spent at the site of the beginning of the next day's stage.

=== Stage 10 ===
14 July 2009 — Limoges to Issoudun, 193 km

The Bastille Day stage, one of two stages on which it was intended riders will not be in radio contact with their team cars, was flat, heading to Issoudun for the first time on the Tour de France. The day's break was initiated by Thierry Hupond in the second kilometre, and he was joined by Mikhail Ignatiev and Benoît Vaugrenard, and after a hold-up at a level crossing, by Samuel Dumoulin. The group's lead never reached four minutes, but over the latter stages the peloton found the gap slow to close. The catch was finally made with a little over 1½ km left, Hupond being the last member of the breakaway to yield to the chasers, and Team Columbia–HTC's train again delivered Mark Cavendish for a win in the sprint, ahead of Thor Hushovd, who retained the green jersey. It was initially announced that a split in the field meant that most of the peloton, including Levi Leipheimer and Bradley Wiggins, two of the top five in the overall classification at the beginning of the day, lost 15 seconds to the first 52 finishers, but this was rescinded the following day.

Stage 10 result

Rank	Rider	Team	Time
1	Mark Cavendish (GBR)	Team Columbia–HTC	4h 46' 43"
2	Thor Hushovd (NOR)	Cervélo TestTeam	s.t.
3	Tyler Farrar (USA)	Garmin–Slipstream	s.t.
4	Leonardo Duque (COL)	Cofidis	s.t.
5	José Joaquín Rojas (ESP)	Caisse d'Epargne	s.t.
6	Lloyd Mondory (FRA)	Ag2r–La Mondiale	s.t.
7	Kenny van Hummel (NED)	Skil–Shimano	s.t.
8	William Bonnet (FRA)	Bbox Bouygues Telecom	s.t.
9	Daniele Bennati (ITA)	Liquigas	s.t.
10	Saïd Haddou (FRA)	Bbox Bouygues Telecom	s.t.

General classification after stage 10

Rank	Rider	Team	Time
1	Rinaldo Nocentini (ITA)	Ag2r–La Mondiale	39h 11' 04"
2	Alberto Contador (ESP)	Astana	+ 6"
DSQ	~~Lance Armstrong (USA)~~	~~Astana~~	~~+ 8"~~
4	Levi Leipheimer (USA)	Astana	+ 39"
5	Bradley Wiggins (GBR)	Garmin–Slipstream	+ 46"
6	Andreas Klöden (GER)	Astana	+ 54"
7	Tony Martin (GER)	Team Columbia–HTC	+ 1' 00"
8	Christian Vande Velde (USA)	Garmin–Slipstream	+ 1' 24"
9	Andy Schleck (LUX)	Team Saxo Bank	+ 1' 49"
10	Vincenzo Nibali (ITA)	Liquigas	+ 1' 54"

=== Stage 11 ===
15 July 2009 — Vatan to Saint-Fargeau, 192 km

This was another flat stage, with a two-man breakaway, consisting of Johan Van Summeren and Marcin Sapa, which reached its largest advantage of 4'45" after 45 km and was caught with 5 km remaining. Mark Cavendish again dominated the sprint, taking his fourth stage of the tour and regaining the green jersey.

Stage 11 result

Rank	Rider	Team	Time
1	Mark Cavendish (GBR)	Team Columbia–HTC	4h 17' 55"
2	Tyler Farrar (USA)	Garmin–Slipstream	s.t.
3	Yauheni Hutarovich (BLR)	Française des Jeux	s.t.
4	Óscar Freire (ESP)	Rabobank	s.t.
5	Thor Hushovd (NOR)	Cervélo TestTeam	s.t.
6	Leonardo Duque (COL)	Cofidis	s.t.
7	Gerald Ciolek (GER)	Team Milram	s.t.
8	Lloyd Mondory (FRA)	Ag2r–La Mondiale	s.t.
9	William Bonnet (FRA)	Bbox Bouygues Telecom	s.t.
10	Nikolay Trusov (RUS)	Team Katusha	s.t.

General classification after stage 11

Rank	Rider	Team	Time
1	Rinaldo Nocentini (ITA)	Ag2r–La Mondiale	43h 28' 59"
2	Alberto Contador (ESP)	Astana	+ 6"
DSQ	~~Lance Armstrong (USA)~~	~~Astana~~	~~+ 8"~~
4	Levi Leipheimer (USA)	Astana	+ 39"
5	Bradley Wiggins (GBR)	Garmin–Slipstream	+ 46"
6	Andreas Klöden (GER)	Astana	+ 54"
7	Tony Martin (GER)	Team Columbia–HTC	+ 1' 00"
8	Christian Vande Velde (USA)	Garmin–Slipstream	+ 1' 24"
9	Andy Schleck (LUX)	Team Saxo Bank	+ 1' 49"
10	Vincenzo Nibali (ITA)	Liquigas	+ 1' 54"
