= 2009 Brabantse Pijl =

Race details
- Dates: 29 March 2009
- Stages: 1
- Distance: 194.5 km (120.9 mi)
- Winning time: 4h 22' 00"

Results
	Winner	Anthony Geslin (FRA)
	Second	Jérôme Pineau (FRA)
	Third	Fabian Wegmann (GER)

The 2009 Brabantse Pijl was the 49th edition of the Brabantse Pijl cycle race and was held on 29 March 2009. The race started in Leuven and finished in Beersel. The race was won by Anthony Geslin.

== General classification ==
Final general classification

Rank	Rider	Time
1	Anthony Geslin (FRA)	4h 22' 00"
2	Jérôme Pineau (FRA)	+ 0"
3	Fabian Wegmann (GER)	+ 0"
4	Björn Leukemans (BEL)	+ 0"
5	Karsten Kroon (NED)	+ 0"
6	Frederik Willems (BEL)	+ 3"
7	Xavier Florencio (ESP)	+ 3"
8	Christian Knees (GER)	+ 7"
9	Philippe Gilbert (BEL)	+ 20"
10	Benoît Vaugrenard (FRA)	+ 20"
