= 2009 Three Days of De Panne =

Race details
- Dates: 31 March–2 April 2009
- Stages: 3
- Distance: 544.75 km (338.49 mi)
- Winning time: 12h 34' 57"

Results
	Winner	Frederik Willems (BEL)
	Second	Joost Posthuma (NED)
	Third	Tom Leezer (NED)

The 2009 Three Days of De Panne was the 33rd edition of the Three Days of De Panne cycle race and was held on 31 March to 2 April 2009. The race started in Middelkerke and finished in De Panne. The race was won by Frederik Willems.

== General classification ==
Final general classification

Rank	Rider	Time
1	Frederik Willems (BEL)	12h 34' 57"
2	Joost Posthuma (NED)	+ 19"
3	Tom Leezer (NED)	+ 54"
4	Manuel Quinziato (ITA)	+ 1' 00"
5	Greg Henderson (NZL)	+ 1' 02"
6	Borut Božič (SLO)	+ 1' 03"
7	Martijn Maaskant (NED)	+ 1' 12"
8	Leif Hoste (BEL)	+ 1' 19"
9	Steve Chainel (FRA)	+ 1' 22"
10	Mauro Finetto (ITA)	s.t.
