= Frederik Willems =

Belgian cyclist

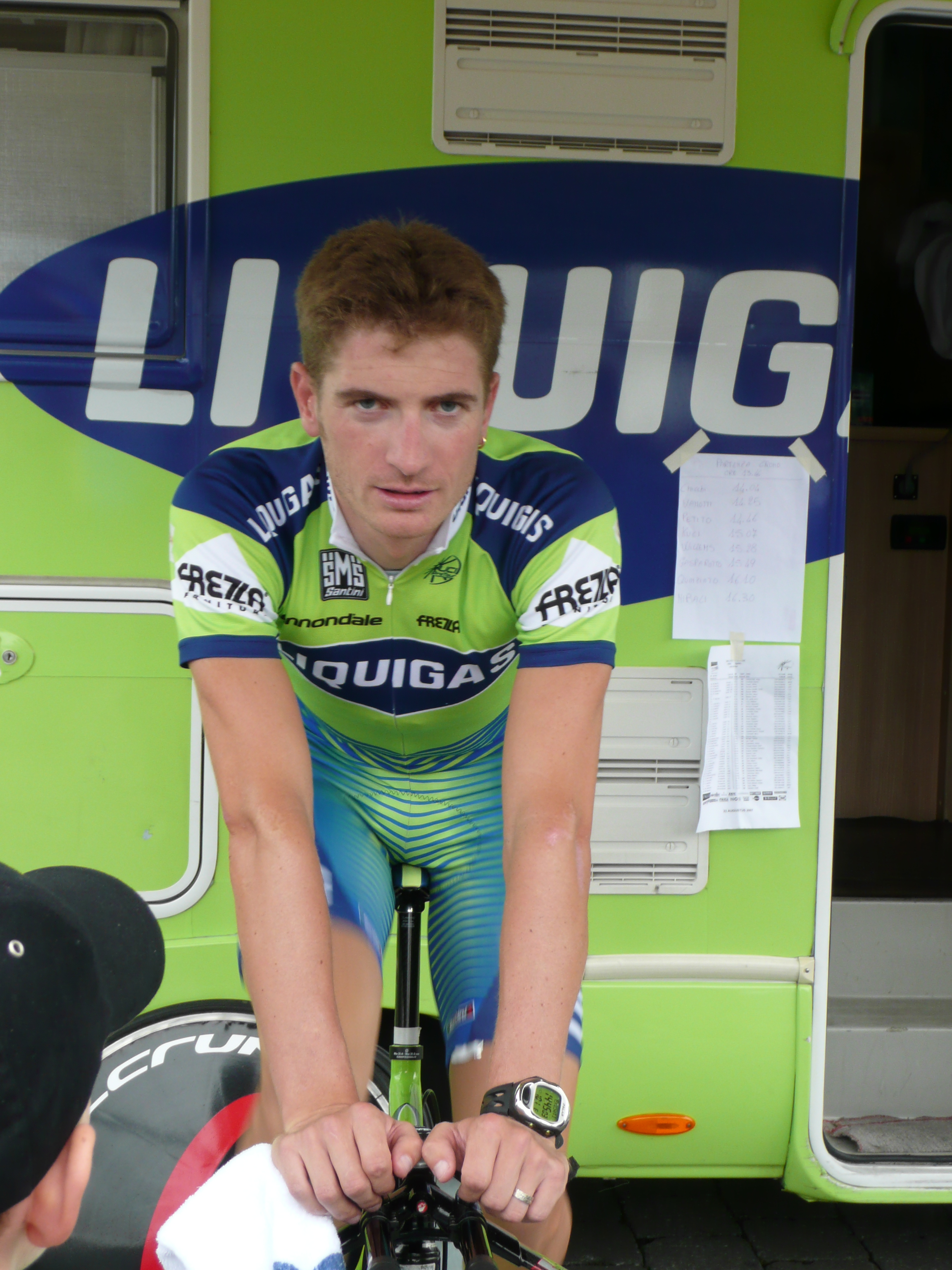
- Willems at the 2007 Eneco Tour.

Personal information
- Full name: Frederik Willems
- Born: 8 September 1979 (age 47) Eeklo, Belgium
- Height: 1.81 m (5 ft 11 in)
- Weight: 70 kg (154 lb)

Cycling career
- Sport: Cycling
- Current team: Retired
- Discipline: Road
- Role: Rider

Amateur teams
- 2001: Mapei–Quick-Step (stagiaire)
- 2002: Mapei-Quick Step-Latexco
- 2002: Mapei–Quick-Step (stagiaire)

Professional teams
- 2003–2006: Vlaanderen–T Interim
- 2007–2010: Liquigas
- 2011: Omega Pharma–Lotto
- 2012–2014: Lotto–Belisol

Major wins
- Étoile de Bessèges (2006); Three Days of De Panne (2009)

Frederik Willems (born 8 September 1979) is a Belgian former professional road bicycle racer who competed professionally from 2003 to 2014. His greatest achievement to date is in winning the 2006 Étoile de Bessèges while riding for Chocolade Jacques–Topsport Vlaanderen, with whom he began his career in 2003 and rode until the end of 2006.

== Career achievements ==
=== Major results ===
2000
1st Stage 1 GP Tell
2nd Ronde van Vlaanderen U23
2001
1st Seraing-Aachen-Seraing
4th Vlaamse Pijl
6th Overall Le Triptyque des Monts et Châteaux

1st Stage 4

6th Grand Prix de Waregem
2002
1st Stage 7 Vuelta a Cuba
2004
1st Mountains classification, Three Days of De Panne
10th Overall Tour de l'Avenir
10th Overall Circuit des Mines
2005
10th Overall Tour de Wallonie
2006
1st Overall Étoile de Bessèges

1st Stage 1

1st Stage 4 Tour of Britain
4th Overall Driedaagse van West-Vlaanderen
5th Overall Ster Elektrotoer

1st Stage 3

7th Nokere Koerse
2008
5th Brabantse Pijl
2009
1st Overall Three Days of De Panne
6th Brabantse Pijl

=== Grand Tour general classification results timeline ===
Grand Tour	2007	2008	2009	2010	2011	2012	2013
Giro d'Italia	—	—	—	—	—	—	117
Tour de France	73	110	86	—	DNF	—	163
Vuelta a España	—	—	—	88	—	142	—

Legend
—	Did not compete
DNF	Did not finish
