= Marco Bandiera =

Italian former road bicycle racer

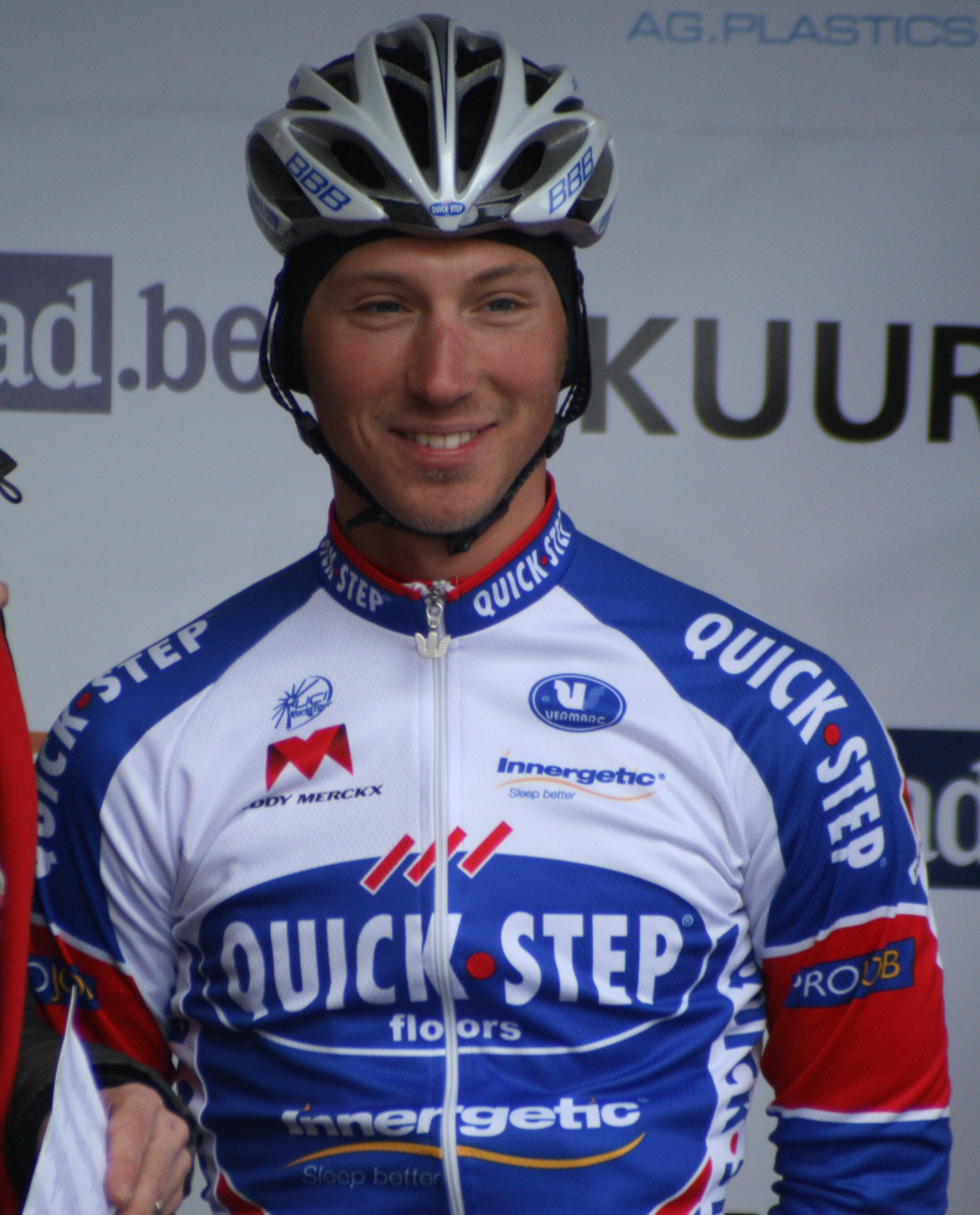
- Bandiera at the 2011 Kuurne–Brussels–Kuurne

Personal information
- Full name: Marco Bandiera
- Born: 12 June 1984 (age 42) Castelfranco Veneto, Italy

Cycling career
- Sport: Cycling
- Discipline: Road
- Role: Rider

Amateur team
- 2005–2007: Zalf–Désirée–Fior

Professional teams
- 2007: →Lampre–Fondital (stagiaire)
- 2008–2009: Lampre
- 2010: Team Katusha
- 2011–2012: Quick-Step
- 2013: IAM Cycling
- 2014–2016: Androni Giocattoli–Venezuela

Marco Bandiera (born 12 June 1984) is an Italian former road bicycle racer, who competed professionally between 2008 and 2016 for the Lampre–NGC, Team Katusha, Omega Pharma–Quick-Step, IAM Cycling and Androni Giocattoli–Sidermec squads.

== Major results ==
2004
3rd GP Kranj
2005
2nd Trofeo Alcide Degasperi
2nd Gran Premio di Poggiana
5th Trofeo Gianfranco Bianchin
2006
1st Trofeo Zsšdi
1st GP Capodarco
2nd Giro del Casentino
4th Trofeo Franco Balestra
9th Giro del Belvedere
9th Trofeo Città di Brescia
2007
Giro del Veneto (U23)

1st Stages 1 & 3

1st Stage 1 Giro della Valle d'Aosta
2008
9th Giro del Piemonte
2009
9th Vattenfall Cyclassics
2012
1st Mountains classification Tour of Turkey
2013
6th Omloop Het Nieuwsblad
2014
1st Sprints classification Giro d'Italia
2015
1st Sprints classification Giro d'Italia

=== Grand Tour general classification results timeline ===
Grand Tour	2009	2010	2011	2012	2013	2014	2015
Giro d'Italia	—	—	—	140	—	142	155
Tour de France	145	—	—	—	—	—	—
Vuelta a España	Did not contest during his career						

Legend
—	Did not compete
DNF	Did not finish
