= Piet Rooijakkers =

Dutch road cyclist

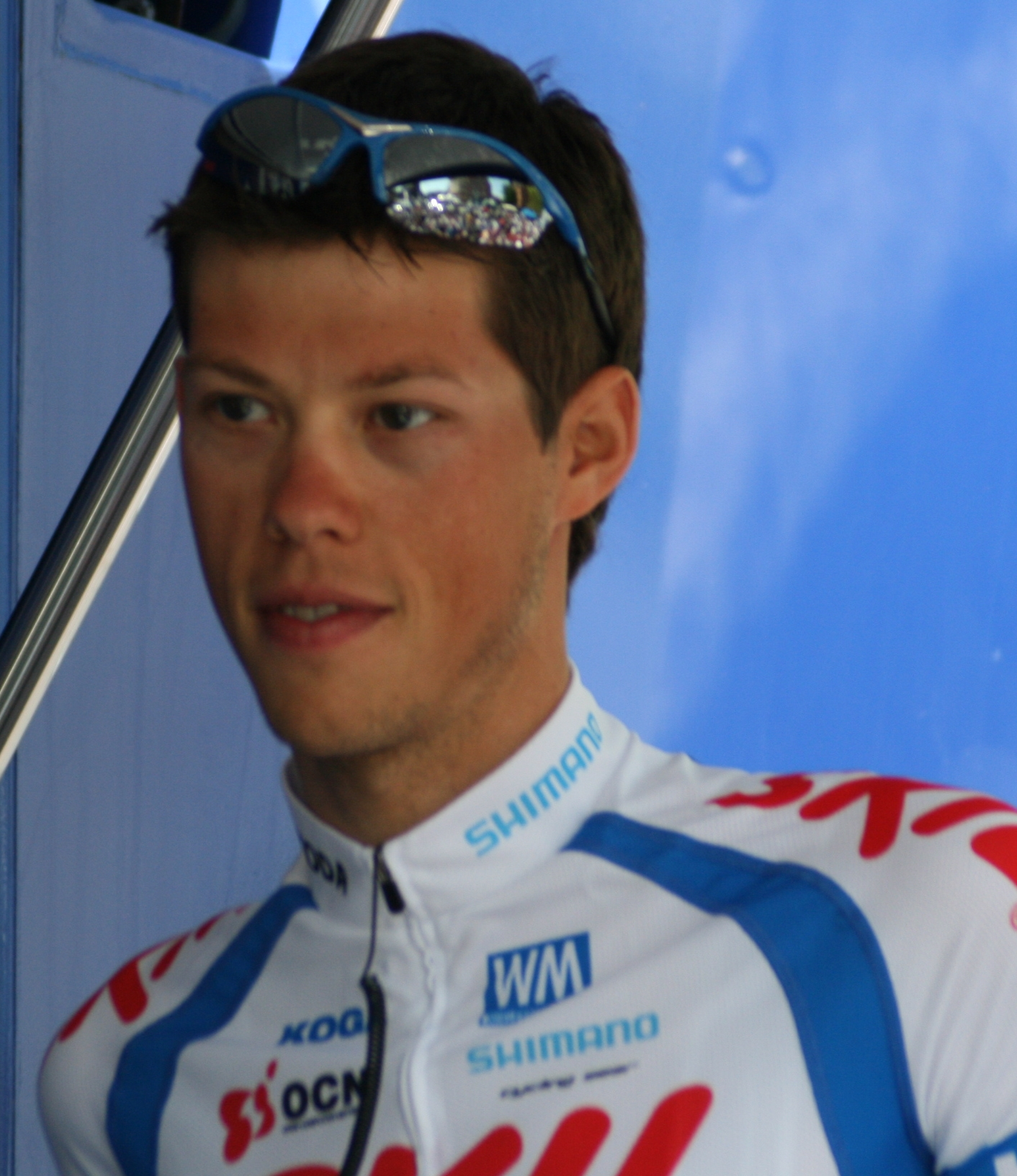

Personal information
- Full name: Piet Rooijakkers
- Born: August 16, 1980 (age 46) Gerwen, the Netherlands
- Height: 1.87 m (6 ft 1 1/2 in)
- Weight: 68 kg (150 lb)

Cycling career
- Sport: Cycling
- Current team: Retired
- Discipline: Road
- Role: Rider

Amateur team
- 2003–2004: Cycling Team Löwik–Tegeltoko

Professional teams
- 2005: Axa Pro Cycling Team
- 2006–2010: Skil–Shimano

Piet Rooijakkers (born 16 August 1980) is a road bicycle racer from the Netherlands. He retired after the 2010 season after his previous team Skil–Shimano did not offer him a contract extension.

== Biography ==
Rooijakkers was born in Gerwen, North Brabant. After finishing his bachelor's degree in business in 2002, he decided to find a part-time job so he would have enough time for cycling. In 2003, he joined the cycling team "Lowik Meubelen-Tegeltoko". He started the Olympia's Tour in that same year, but fell in the fifth stage and could not race for the remainder of the season.

He returned for the 2004 season and won the Criterium of Lieshout and finished third in the Dutch National Amateur Road Race Championships ('vrije renners'). He delivered a very strong performance in the Ster Elektrotour, which gained him the interest of the Axa Pro Cycling Team, who, in 2005, signed him as a semi-professional. In that same year Rooijakkers won four races. In October 2005, Piet signed with Skil–Shimano for 2006, with whom he remained until his retirement in 2010.

Rooijakkers started in the 2009 Tour de France, where he fell during the 4th stage (a team time trial). He broke his arm and had to retire from the race.

== Major results ==
2003
2nd Ronde van Overijssel
2004
2nd Ronde van Overijssel
6th Overall Olympia's Tour
9th Hel van het Mergelland
2005
1st Stage 9 Olympia's Tour
4th Ronde van Overijssel
9th Overall Ster Elektrotoer
10th Noord-Nederland Tour
2006
5th Road race, National Road Championships
6th Omloop van het Houtland
9th Overall Danmark Rundt
2007
5th Overall Tour of Britain
5th Overall Four Days of Dunkirk
2008
1st Stage 1b (TTT) Brixia Tour
5th Nationale Sluitingprijs
7th Overall Ster Elektrotoer
2009
5th Overall Ster Elektrotoer
10th Overall Tour Méditerranéen
2010
6th Batavus Prorace
