= Thierry Hupond =

French cyclist (born 1984)

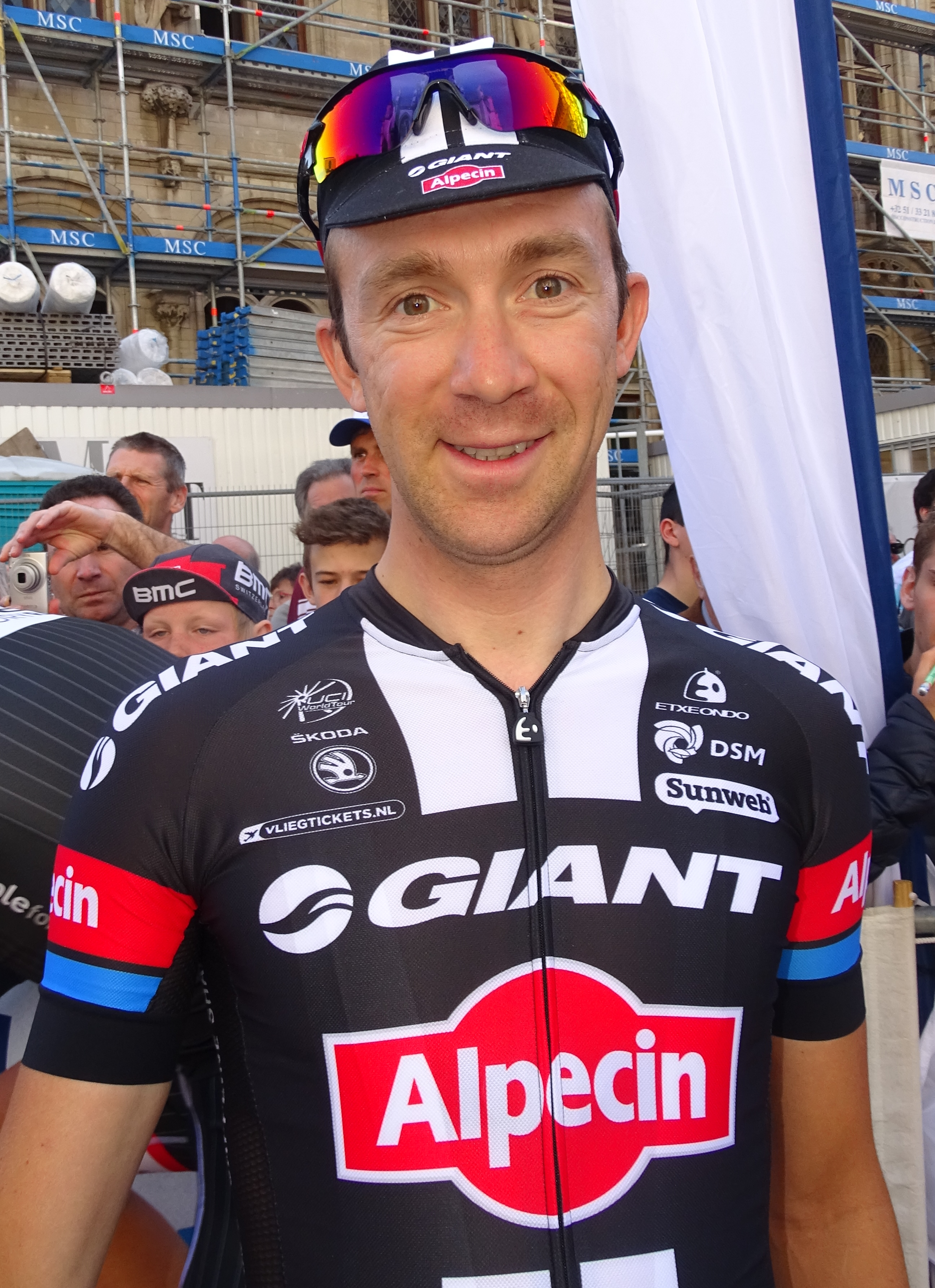
- Hupond at the 2015 Brabantse Pijl.

Personal information
- Full name: Thierry Hupond
- Born: 10 November 1984 (age 41) Décines-Charpieu, Rhône, France
- Height: 1.78 m (5 ft 10 in)
- Weight: 62 kg (137 lb)

Cycling career
- Sport: Cycling
- Current team: Retired
- Discipline: Road
- Role: Rider
- Rider type: All-rounder

Amateur teams
- 2005–2007: Vélo-Club La Pomme Marseille
- 2007: Skil–Shimano (stagiaire)

Professional teams
- 2008–2015: Skil–Shimano
- 2016–2017: Delko–Marseille Provence KTM

Thierry Hupond (born 10 November 1984) is a French former road bicycle racer, who competed professionally between 2008 and 2017 for the Team Giant–Alpecin and Delko–Marseille Provence KTM teams.

Born in Décines-Charpieu, Rhône, Hupond became professional with Skil-Shimano in 2008, having been a stagiaire with the team in late 2007. In the 2008 Paris–Nice, he wore the mountains classification jersey for one day on stage three, having broken away from the field during stage two, building up a lead of fifteen minutes at one point. As a result, he claimed all the mountain points available.

== Career achievements ==
=== Major results ===
2009
3rd Münsterland Giro
2010
4th Les Boucles du Sud Ardèche
2011
2nd Les Boucles du Sud Ardèche
8th Hel van het Mergelland
2014
1st Stage 4 Four Days of Dunkirk
2016
10th Overall La Méditerranéenne

=== Grand Tour general classification results timeline ===
Grand Tour	2015	2016
Giro d'Italia	—	—
Tour de France	—	—
Vuelta a España	142	—

Legend
—	Did not compete
DNF	Did not finish
