= Martijn Maaskant =

Dutch road cyclist (born 1983)

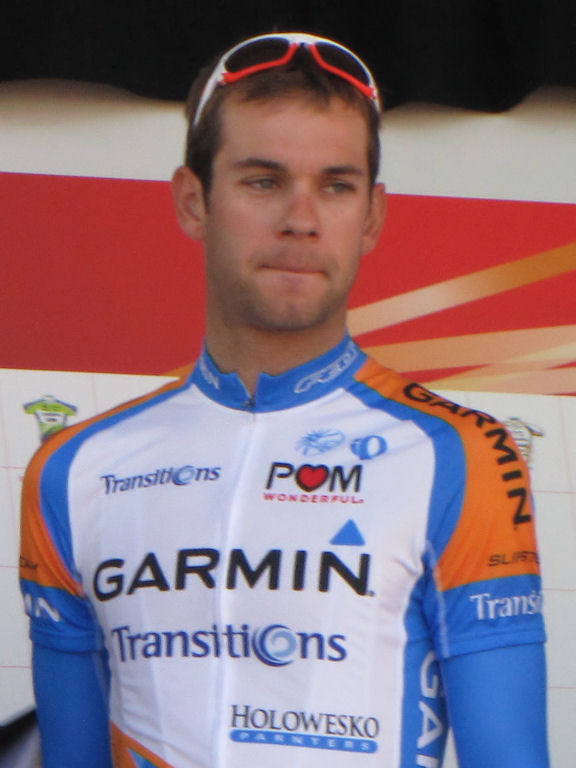
- Maaskant at the 2010 Amstel Gold Race

Personal information
- Full name: Martijn Maaskant
- Born: 27 July 1983 (age 43) Zuidland, South Holland, Netherlands
- Height: 1.85 m (6 ft 1 in)
- Weight: 76 kg (168 lb)

Cycling career
- Sport: Cycling
- Current team: Retired
- Discipline: Road
- Role: Rider
- Rider type: Classics specialist

Amateur teams
- 2003–2005: Van Vliet–EBH Advocaten–Gazelle
- 2006–2007: Rabobank Continental Team

Professional teams
- 2008–2013: Slipstream–Chipotle
- 2014: UnitedHealthcare

Martijn Maaskant (born 27 July 1983) is a retired Dutch professional road racing cyclist. Maaskant competed professionally between 2008 and 2014.

== Biography ==
Maaskant turned professional with Slipstream–Chipotle in 2008. Following a six-year stint with the renamed Garmin–Sharp squad, Maaskant signed with UnitedHealthcare for the 2014 season. After the 2014 season, Maaskant retired from professional cycling.

Born in Zuidland, South Holland, Netherlands, Maaskant currently resides in Lanaken, Flanders, Belgium.

== Career achievements ==
=== Major results ===
2003
1st Stage 3 Olympia's Tour
2005
6th Beverbeek Classic
7th Overall Olympia's Tour
9th Grote Prijs Stad Zottegem
9th Paris–Roubaix Espoirs
2006
1st Stage 4 Tour de Normandie
2nd Hel van het Mergelland
10th GP Herning
10th Overall Olympia's Tour
2007
1st Ronde van Drenthe
1st Stage 1 Circuito Montañés
1st Overall Tour de Normandie
2nd Overall Olympia's Tour

1st Stage 2

2nd Overall Circuit de Lorraine

1st Stage 4

2nd Overall Le Triptyque des Monts et Châteaux
2nd Beverbeek Classic
6th Grand Prix Pino Cerami
10th Schaal Sels-Merksem
2008
4th Paris–Roubaix
4th Monte Paschi Eroica
7th Dutch Food Valley Classic
2009
1st Stage 1 (TTT) Tour of Qatar
4th Tour of Flanders
7th Overall Three Days of De Panne
2011
7th Omloop Het Nieuwsblad

=== Grand Tour general classification results timeline ===
Grand Tour	2008	2009	2010	2011	2012
Giro d'Italia	—	—	—	—	—
Tour de France	133	95	138	—	—
Vuelta a España	—	135	—	—	150

Legend
—	Did not compete
DNF	Did not finish
