= Green jersey =

Clothing in road bicycle racing

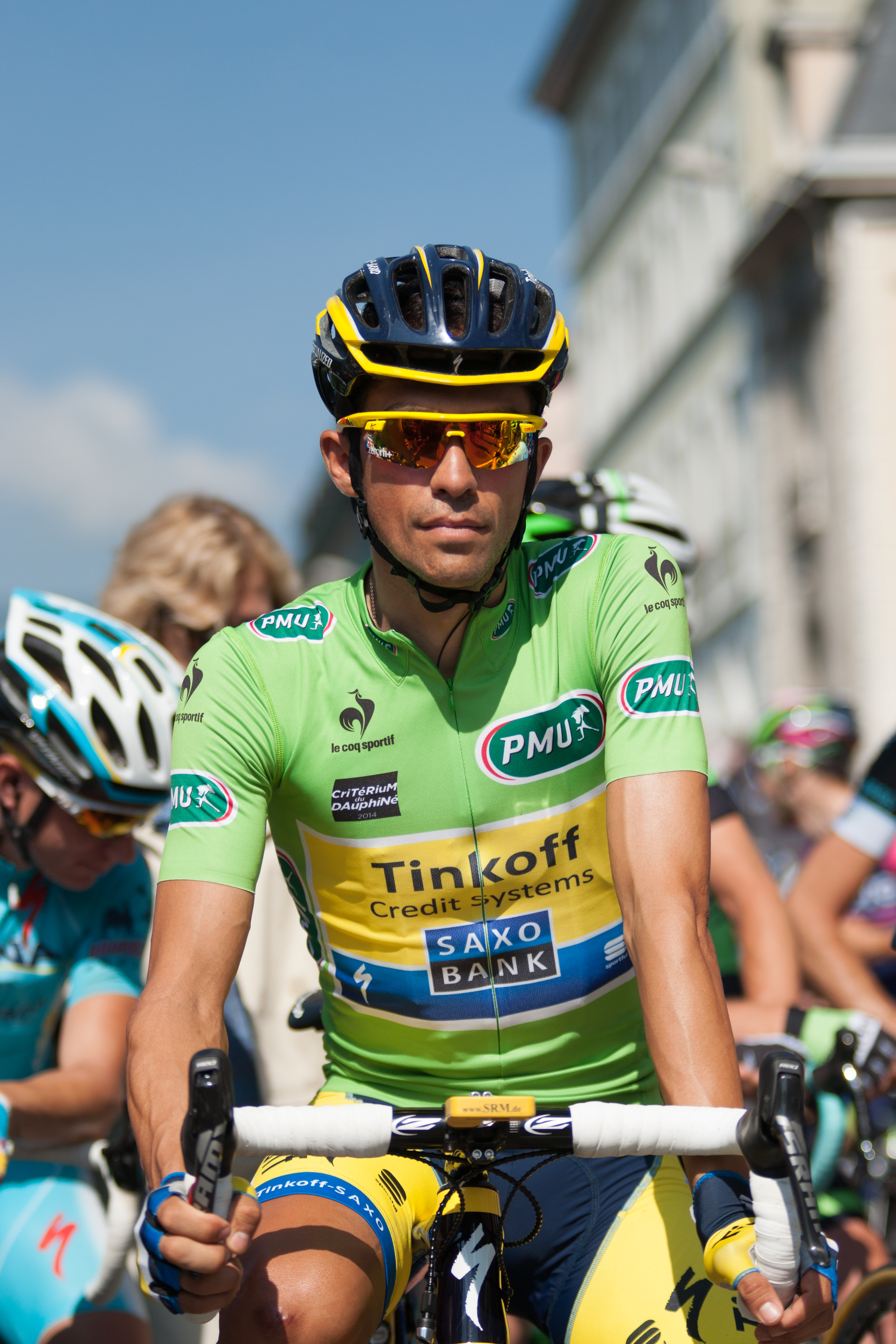
Alberto Contador in green jersey at the Critérium du Dauphiné 2014

In road bicycle racing (e.g. Grand Tour stage races), the green jersey is a distinctive racing jersey worn by the most consistent highest finisher in the competition.

While the overall race leader in the Tour de France will wear the yellow jersey, or "maillot jaune", the green jersey ("maillot vert") will be worn by the leader in the points competition. Since 2009, the Vuelta a España has also used the green jersey to signify the leader of the points competition. In the Giro d'Italia, the green jersey was, from 1974 to 2011, worn by the King of the Mountains, the leader in the competition for climbing specialists.

== Classification guide ==
The following events use the "green jersey" to signify the current leader and/or final winner of the overall classification by points (often known as the sprinters' competition):

- Tour de France (known as the "maillot vert") (see also Points classification in the Tour de France)
- Vuelta a España
- Critérium du Dauphiné Libéré
- Tour de l'Avenir
- Tour de Georgia
- Tour de Romandie
- Tour of Ireland
- Tour of California (known as the "sprints classification")

== Mountains competition leader ==
The following events have used the "green jersey" to signify the current leader and/or final winner of the overall classification of the best climber (often known as the King of the Mountains competition):

- Giro d'Italia (Italian: known as the maglia verde: 1974 to 2011) (see also Mountains classification in the Giro d'Italia)
- Tour de Pologne (Polish: known as the najlepszy góral or Klasyfikacja Górska)
- Vuelta a España (prior to 2008)

As of 2009, no major race uses the "green jersey" to signify the current leader and/or final winner of the overall classification of sprinter where the polka dot jersey represents the king of the mountain.
