= Brice Feillu =

French road bicycle racer

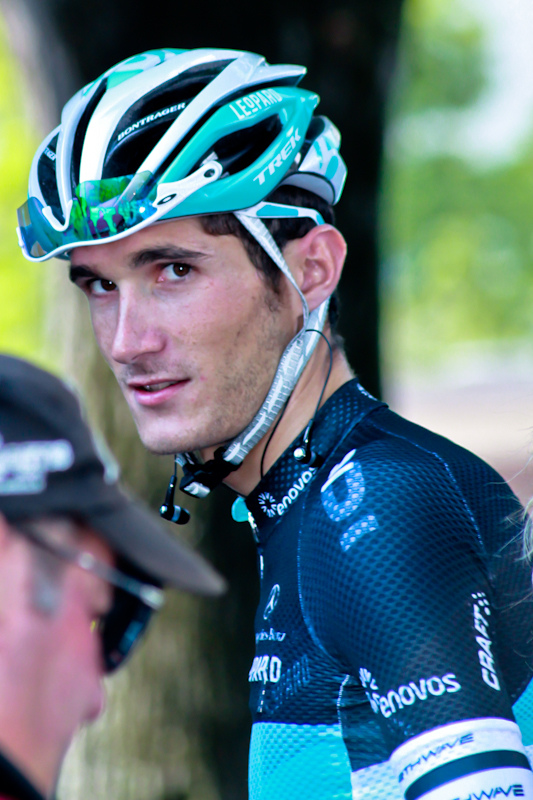
- Feillu at the 2011 Tour de Romandie

Personal information
- Full name: Brice Feillu
- Born: 26 July 1985 (age 41) Châteaudun, France
- Height: 1.90 m (6 ft 3 in)
- Weight: 69 kg (152 lb)

Cycling career
- Sport: Cycling
- Current team: Retired
- Discipline: Road
- Role: Rider
- Rider type: Climber

Amateur teams
- 2004: Agritubel–Loudun 86
- 2005–2008: CC Nogent-sur-Oise
- 2008: Agritubel (stagiaire)

Professional teams
- 2009: Agritubel
- 2010: Vacansoleil
- 2011: Leopard Trek
- 2012–2013: Saur–Sojasun
- 2014–2019: Bretagne–Séché Environnement

Major wins
- Grand Tours Tour de France 1 individual stage (2009)

Brice Feillu (born 26 July 1985) is a French former road racing cyclist, who rode professionally between 2009 and 2019 for the Agritubel, Vacansoleil, Leopard Trek, Sojasun and Arkéa–Samsic teams.

== Career ==
Born in Châteaudun, Eure-et-Loir, he is the younger brother of Romain Feillu, who was also a road racing cyclist. Brice Feillu achieved his greatest success with a stage victory on Stage 7 (from Barcelona to Arcalis, Andorra) of the 2009 Tour de France, the highest finish of that year's tour and the longest stage.

Feillu joined Bretagne–Séché Environnement for the 2014 season, after his previous team – Sojasun – folded at the end of the 2013 season.

== Major results ==
2007
7th Overall Tour Alsace

1st Young rider classification

10th Overall Tour du Haut-Anjou
2008
2nd Overall Paris–Corrèze
6th Overall Tour Alsace

1st Stage 5

2009
1st Stage 7 Tour de France
2010
8th Grand Prix d'Ouverture La Marseillaise
8th Grand Prix de Plumelec-Morbihan
2012
6th Overall Volta a Portugal
8th Klasika Primavera
10th Overall Circuit de Lorraine
2014
2nd Overall Boucles de la Mayenne
2015
1st Mountains classification, Tour de l'Ain
9th Overall Four Days of Dunkirk
2016
1st Mountains classification, Tour de Luxembourg
9th Overall Tour de Savoie Mont-Blanc
2017
1st Mountains classification, Tour de Luxembourg
4th Overall Route du Sud
6th Overall Tour de l'Ain

=== Grand Tour general classification results timeline ===
Grand Tour	2009	2010	2011	2012	2013	2014	2015	2016	2017
Giro d'Italia	—	—	DNF	—	—	—	—	—	—
Tour de France	25	—	—	91	104	16	98	70	16
Vuelta a España	Did not contest during his career								

Legend
—	Did not compete
DNF	Did not finish
