= 2010 Team HTC–Columbia season =

- UCI World Ranking ranking: 6
- Manager: Bob Stapleton

Season victories
- One-day races: 6
- Stage race overall: 8
- Stage race stages: 45

The 2010 season for Team HTC–Columbia began in January with the Tour Down Under and ended in October at the Giro di Lombardia. As a UCI ProTour team, they were automatically invited and obliged to send a squad to every event in the ProTour. The team's general manager was Bob Stapleton, in his third year with the team.

With the team's focus shifting to full-time support of prolific sprinter Mark Cavendish, many riders left the team after the 2009 season, most for the new Team Sky. Several young riders, most of them in their first year at this level of the sport, joined the team to be members of Cavendish's new leadout train, which lacked Cavendish's primary leadout man from 2009, Mark Renshaw, for the first several months of the season due to Epstein-Barr virus. Cavendish's own training and development were also stunted because of a dental infection.

== 2010 roster ==
Ages as of January 1, 2010.

Rider	Date of birth
Michael Albasini (SUI)	December 20, 1980 (aged 29)
Lars Bak (DEN)	January 16, 1980 (aged 29)
Mark Cavendish (GBR)	May 21, 1985 (aged 24)
Gert Dockx (BEL)	July 4, 1988 (aged 21)
Bernhard Eisel (AUT)	February 17, 1981 (aged 28)
Jan Ghyselinck (BEL)	February 24, 1988 (aged 21)
Matthew Goss (AUS)	November 5, 1986 (aged 23)
Bert Grabsch (GER)	June 19, 1975 (aged 34)
André Greipel (GER)	July 16, 1982 (aged 27)
Patrick Gretsch (GER)	April 17, 1987 (aged 22)
Rasmus Guldhammer (DEN)	March 9, 1989 (aged 20)
Adam Hansen (AUS)	May 11, 1981 (aged 28)
Leigh Howard (AUS)	October 18, 1989 (aged 20)
Craig Lewis (USA)	January 10, 1985 (aged 24)

Rider	Date of birth
Tony Martin (GER)	April 23, 1985 (aged 24)
Maxime Monfort (BEL)	January 14, 1983 (aged 26)
Marco Pinotti (ITA)	February 25, 1976 (aged 33)
František Raboň (CZE)	September 26, 1983 (aged 26)
Mark Renshaw (AUS)	October 22, 1982 (aged 27)
Vicente Reynès (ESP)	July 30, 1981 (aged 28)
Michael Rogers (AUS)	December 20, 1979 (aged 30)
Hayden Roulston (NZL)	January 10, 1981 (aged 28)
Aleksej Saramontins (LAT)	April 8, 1982 (aged 27)
Marcel Sieberg (GER)	April 30, 1982 (aged 27)
Kanstantsin Sivtsov (BLR)	August 9, 1982 (aged 27)
Tejay van Garderen (USA)	August 12, 1988 (aged 21)
Martin Velits (SVK)	February 21, 1985 (aged 24)
Peter Velits (SVK)	February 21, 1985 (aged 24)

Riders who joined the team for the 2010 season

Rider	2009 team
Lars Bak	Team Saxo Bank
Jan Ghyselinck	neo-pro
Matthew Goss	Team Saxo Bank
Patrick Gretsch	Thüringer Energie Team
Rasmus Guldhammer	Team Capinordic
Leigh Howard	Team AIS
Hayden Roulston	Cervélo TestTeam
Aleksej Saramontins	Designa Køkken
Tejay van Garderen	Rabobank continental team
Martin Velits	Team Milram
Peter Velits	Team Milram

Riders who left the team during or after the 2009 season

Rider	2010 team
Michael Barry	Team Sky
Edvald Boasson Hagen	Team Sky
Marcus Burghardt	BMC Racing Team
Greg Henderson	Team Sky
George Hincapie	BMC Racing Team
Kim Kirchen	Team Katusha
Thomas Lövkvist	Team Sky
Morris Possoni	Team Sky

== One-day races ==
Greipel scored the team's first one-day victory in February, before the spring season and the races known as 'classics' were held. Greipel was first over the line in the Trofeo Magaluf-Palmanovoa, a part of the Vuelta a Mallorca quasi-stage race, and expressed surprise at his victory on such a hilly course when asked after the race.

== Stage races ==
The team attended the Tour Down Under, with a squad headed by André Greipel. Though Greipel did not wish to be considered a favorite for victory in the event, he went on to win the event's general and points classifications, and three of the six stages. The team next took wins at two partially concurrent events in February, the inaugural Tour of Oman and the Volta ao Algarve. Howard's win in stage 4 in Oman was his first as a professional, while Greipel's successful early season continued in Portugal with wins in stage 2 and the points classification. Later in the month, Rogers won the Ruta Del Sol without winning a stage. It was his first overall stage race victory since 2003.

== Grand Tours ==
=== Giro d'Italia ===
Team HTC-Columbia came to the Giro with a squad led by Greipel, the season's most prolific winner of individual days of racing and a heavy favorite in the Giro's flat stages, and Pinotti, who would try for a high overall placing and stage wins in the time trials. Pinotti was tenth in the stage 1 time trial in Amsterdam. Goss and Greipel both made all the splits occurring after many crashes marred stage 2. In the depleted sprint finish, the Australian took second despite entering the Giro prepared to be Greipel's leadout man. Greipel was fourth and did not seriously challenge stage winner Tyler Farrar. More crashes occurred in stage 3. Greipel again made all the selections, but again was not a factor in the sprint, taking just sixth on the day. The squad's best-placed rider prior the transfer to Italy was Sieberg in fifth, 7 seconds behind the race leader. With the squad noted as one of the favorites in the stage 4 team time trial, Sieberg, as well as Goss and Greipel both three seconds back of him, all had a realistic chance of taking the pink jersey. The squad finished the 32.5 km (20.2 mi) course with five riders together in 36'58". Goss and Greipel were among the five finishing together, but their 21-second gap to stage winners Liquigas–Doimo meant that the team missed out on getting the pink jersey.

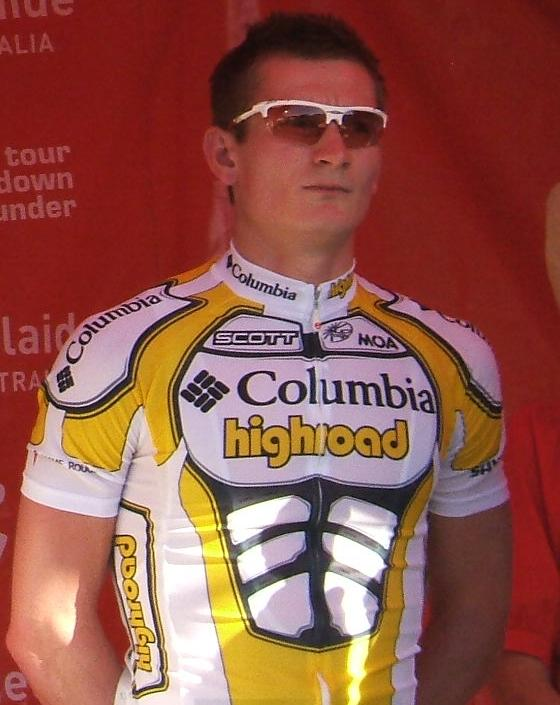
André Greipel had the most wins of any cyclist in the 2010 season, and a stage in the Giro d'Italia was one of them.

Stage 7 was difficult, long and run partially on unpaved roads. The day on which the stage was run happened to have very heavy rain, making the course muddy and still more treacherous. Pinotti rode with the leaders most of the day, following a move by Alexander Vinokourov after overnight race leader Vincenzo Nibali needed a bike change. Pinotti was not quite able to bridge up to the leading trio of Vinokourov, Damiano Cunego, and stage winner Cadel Evans in the final kilometer, finishing six seconds back for fourth on the day. The result moved him into sixth in the overall standings. The ninth stage was very flat, without any categorized hills. Garmin–Transitions forced a grueling pace in the final kilometers, which led to a split in the field – only 47 riders finished together at the head of the field. Greipel had difficulties keeping the pace and was just 19th on the day. Goss rode at the front of the field intending to lead Greipel out, but when he saw that the big German was not at the front of the race with 400 m (1,300 ft) to go, he rode for himself and won the stage. The next day's stage was also flat, and Greipel again had troubles in the sprint, coming only seventh out of the nine riders who finished three seconds ahead of the rest of the peloton. In stage 11, when more than 50 riders formed the day's breakaway group, Goss was the only HTC-Columbia rider to make the selection. He did not come close to staying with the leaders, however, finishing just three seconds ahead of the peloton and with them nearly 13 minutes behind the stage winner. These results moved Pinotti out of the top ten overall. Pinotti took seventh in stage 12, when a late ten-man selection of General Classification favorites and hopefuls finished ten seconds ahead of the peloton. Lewis made a winning breakaway in stage 13. He attacked in the final kilometer and appeared poised for a stage win, but Manuel Belletti passed him up 100 m (330 ft) from the finish line.

Greipel would normally have pulled out of the race well before its most difficult mountain stages took place, but having missed out on the sprints in the race's first two weeks, he rode through the high mountain stages 14 and 15 (which Pinotti finished among the top ten in both) and the Plan de Corones time trial with stage 18 in mind. Very short and very flat, the stage was ideal for Greipel. The team rode a tempo at the head of the peloton to keep the day's breakaway in check, and caught them in the stage's final few kilometers. Getting an effective leadout from Sieberg and Raboň, Greipel at last took a Giro stage win.

In stage 19, which went over the Passo del Mortirolo, Pinotti returned to the top ten overall by finishing tenth on the day. Pinotti very nearly won the time trial which closed out the Giro. He posted a better split at the intermediate time check than provisional best and eventual stage winner Gustav Larsson, but faded in the final kilometers to finish two seconds back, for second. The result did, however, move him from tenth overall up to ninth, at a deficit of 14'20" to Giro champion Ivan Basso. The squad finished 16th in the Trofeo Fast Team standings but did much better in the Trofeo Super Team, coming in second in that classification.

=== Tour de France ===
The team's squad for the Tour de France was largely centered around Cavendish and the goal of having him win the green jersey. This was in spite of the fact that the Manxman's season to date had been subpar, with only three victories before the Tour (in 2009 he had 13 wins before the Tour). Rogers, coming off overall wins in the Tour of California and the Ruta Del Sol, was the squad's General Classification hopeful.

Martin was one of the earliest starters in the prologue time trial, and was the leader for most of the day with a time of ten minutes and ten seconds. Fabian Cancellara was one of the day's last starters and was the only rider to beat Martin's time, leaving the young German second on the day. The first road race stage in Belgium featured many crashes, including one very near the finish line that greatly reduced the number of riders in position to sprint for victory. Renshaw avoided the pileups, but missed out on the stage win to Alessandro Petacchi. Cavendish finished with the second group on the road, not crossing the line until two and a half minutes after Petacchi. The squad was one of the fortunate few to emerge from the crash-ridden second stage without any injuries. The fourth stage was again flat and more straightforward this time, as there were no serious crashes on the day. Cavendish, however, continued to struggle, coming home a distant twelfth in the field sprint. Finally, in stage 5, Cavendish took his first win of the Tour, and appeared very emotional on the podium when accepting the day's honors. He added another sprint win the next day in stage 6. Stage 8 was the last before the Tour's first day, ending at Morzine-Avoriaz in the Alps, a stage sure to help define the race's overall classification. Rogers finished twelfth on the day and 20 seconds behind the first group on the road, but gaining time against some contenders such as Joaquim Rodríguez and Andreas Klöden. However, the high mountain stage 9, incorporating the Col de la Madeleine, Rogers lost four minutes to the stage winner and two minutes to the majority of the race's elite riders, falling to 14th. He continued to fall in the standings further from that point on, eventually finishing the race in 37th place.

Cavendish's success in the flats continued, however, as he won stage 11 with a sizeable lead over Petacchi and Tyler Farrar. The stage was notable for events which took place during that sprint. Farrar's leadout man Julian Dean and Cavendish's leadout man Renshaw clashed for position at the head of the peloton in the stage's final meters. As Dean led Farrar up the middle of the road with Renshaw to his left, the Aussie responded by head-butting him. Renshaw later stated that he was trying to keep Dean from maneuvering him into the roadside barricades, with safety as much a concern as victory, and Dean's line did deviate slightly as he rode. Amid the chaos, the three principal sprinters jumped for an unusually long final kick to the line, starting 400 m (1,300 ft) out. Race officials later expelled Renshaw from the Tour for the headbutting. Dean was not punished for the incident, though the possibility for penalty existed – Cavendish himself was assessed a penalty in the 2009 Tour de France for similar irregular sprinting. In stage 13 two days later, a field sprint seemed to be shaping up until Alexander Vinokourov slipped away for a solo win by a margin of 13 seconds. Cavendish indeed led the peloton across the finish line, but it was only for second place. Cavendish won the Tour's last two road race stages, stage 18 in Bordeaux and on the Champs-Élysées for the second year in a row, a Tour first. His five wins in the 2010 Tour gave him 15 for his career, the most ever for a sprinter despite only having ridden four Tours. His poor performances early in the Tour, however, meant he again fell just short of claiming the green jersey, losing out to Petacchi by 11 points. The squad finished 17th in the teams classification.

== Season victories ==
Date	Race	Competition	Rider	Country	Location
January 19	Tour Down Under, Stage 1	UCI ProTour	André Greipel (GER)	Australia	Tanunda
January 20	Tour Down Under, Stage 2	UCI ProTour	André Greipel (GER)	Australia	Hahndorf
January 22	Tour Down Under, Stage 4	UCI ProTour	André Greipel (GER)	Australia	Goolwa
January 24	Tour Down Under, Overall	UCI ProTour	André Greipel (GER)	Australia	
January 24	Tour Down Under, Sprints classification	UCI ProTour	André Greipel (GER)	Australia	
February 11	Trofeo Magaluf-Palmanova	UCI Europe Tour	André Greipel (GER)	Spain	Mallorca
February 17	Tour of Oman, Stage 4	UCI Asia Tour	Leigh Howard (AUS)	Oman	Nakhal
February 18	Volta ao Algarve, Stage 2	UCI Europe Tour	André Greipel (GER)	Portugal	Lagos
February 19	Tour of Oman, Teams classification	UCI Asia Tour	(Note: The riders on the squad were Bernhard Eisel, Martin Velits, Patrick Gretsch, Gert Dockx, Lars Bak, Marco Pinotti, Leigh Howard, and Adam Hansen)	Oman	
February 21	Volta ao Algarve, Points classification	UCI Europe Tour	André Greipel (GER)	Portugal	
February 25	Ruta Del Sol, Overall	UCI Europe Tour	Michael Rogers (AUS)	Spain	
March 6	Vuelta a Murcia, Stage 4	UCI Europe Tour	František Raboň (CZE)	Spain	Alhama de Murcia
March 7	Vuelta a Murcia, Overall	UCI Europe Tour	František Raboň (CZE)	Spain	
March 23	Volta a Catalunya, Stage 2	UCI ProTour	Mark Cavendish (GBR)	Spain	Banyoles
March 28	Gent–Wevelgem	UCI ProTour	Bernhard Eisel (AUT)	Belgium	Wevelgem
April 10	Tour of the Basque Country, Teams classification	UCI ProTour	(Note: The riders on the squad were Kanstantsin Sivtsov, Marco Pinotti, Peter Velits, Michael Albasini, Maxime Monfort, Michael Rogers, and Rasmus Guldhammer)	Spain	
April 11	Presidential Cycling Tour of Turkey, Stage 1	UCI Europe Tour	André Greipel (GER)	Turkey	Istanbul
April 12	Presidential Cycling Tour of Turkey, Stage 2	UCI Europe Tour	André Greipel (GER)	Turkey	Turgutreis
April 15	Presidential Cycling Tour of Turkey, Stage 5	UCI Europe Tour	André Greipel (GER)	Turkey	Fethiye
April 16	Presidential Cycling Tour of Turkey, Stage 6	UCI Europe Tour	André Greipel (GER)	Turkey	Finike
April 18	Presidential Cycling Tour of Turkey, Stage 8	UCI Europe Tour	André Greipel (GER)	Turkey	Alanya
April 16	Presidential Cycling Tour of Turkey, Points classification	UCI Europe Tour	André Greipel (GER)	Turkey	
April 27	Tour de Romandie, Prologue	UCI ProTour	Marco Pinotti (ITA)	Switzerland	Porrentruy
April 29	Tour de Romandie, Stage 2	UCI ProTour	Mark Cavendish (GBR)	Switzerland	Fribourg
May 16	Tour of California, Stage 1	UCI America Tour	Mark Cavendish (GBR)	United States	Sacramento
May 17	Giro d'Italia, Stage 9	UCI World Ranking	Matthew Goss (AUS)	Italy	Cava de' Tirreni
May 22	Tour of California, Stage 7	UCI America Tour	Tony Martin (GER)	United States	Los Angeles
May 23	Tour of California, Overall	UCI America Tour	Michael Rogers (AUS)	United States	
May 27	Giro d'Italia, Stage 18	UCI World Ranking	André Greipel (GER)	Italy	Brescia
May 29	Bayern-Rundfahrt, Stage 4	UCI Europe Tour	Maxime Monfort (BEL)	Germany	Berching
May 30	Bayern-Rundfahrt, Overall	UCI Europe Tour	Maxime Monfort (BEL)	Germany	
May 30	Bayern-Rundfahrt, Sprints classification	UCI Europe Tour	Leigh Howard (AUS)	Germany	
June 6	Philadelphia International Championship	UCI America Tour	Matthew Goss (AUS)	United States	Philadelphia
June 19	Ster Elektrotoer, Stage 3	UCI Europe Tour	Adam Hansen (AUS)	Netherlands	La Gileppe
June 20	Ster Elektrotoer, Overall	UCI Europe Tour	Adam Hansen (AUS)	Netherlands	
June 20	Ster Elektrotoer, Points classification	UCI Europe Tour	André Greipel (GER)	Netherlands	
June 20	Tour de Suisse, Stage 9	UCI World Ranking	Tony Martin (GER)	Switzerland	Liestal
July 4	Tour of Austria, Stage 1	UCI Europe Tour	André Greipel (GER)	Austria	Bludenz
July 8	Tour de France, Stage 5	UCI World Ranking	Mark Cavendish (GBR)	France	Montargis
July 9	Tour de France, Stage 6	UCI World Ranking	Mark Cavendish (GBR)	France	Gueugnon
July 9	Tour of Austria, Stage 6	UCI Europe Tour	André Greipel (GER)	Austria	Laxenburg
July 11	Tour of Austria, Points classification	UCI Europe Tour	André Greipel (GER)	Austria	
July 15	Tour de France, Stage 11	UCI World Ranking	Mark Cavendish (GBR)	France	Bourg-lès-Valence
July 23	Tour de France, Stage 18	UCI World Ranking	Mark Cavendish (GBR)	France	Bordeaux
July 25	Tour de France, Stage 20	UCI World Ranking	Mark Cavendish (GBR)	France	Paris
August 2	Tour de Pologne, Stage 2	UCI World Ranking	André Greipel (GER)	Poland	Dąbrowa Górnicza
August 4	Tour of Denmark, Stage 1	UCI Europe Tour	Matthew Goss (AUS)	Denmark	Holstebro
August 7	Tour of Denmark, Stage 4	UCI Europe Tour	Mark Renshaw (AUS)	Denmark	Odense
August 7	Tour de Pologne, Stage 7	UCI World Ranking	André Greipel (GER)	Poland	Kraków
August 8	Tour of Denmark, Stage 6	UCI Europe Tour	Hayden Roulston (NZL)	Denmark	Rudersdal
August 8	Tour of Denmark, Youth classification	UCI Europe Tour	Rasmus Guldhammer (DEN)	Denmark	
August 14	Tour de l'Ain, Youth classification	UCI Europe Tour	Tejay van Garderen (USA)	France	
August 19	Eneco Tour, Stage 2	UCI ProTour	André Greipel (GER)	Belgium	Ardooie
August 22	GP Ouest-France	UCI ProTour	Matthew Goss (AUS)	France	Plouay
August 23	Eneco Tour, Stage 6	UCI ProTour	André Greipel (GER)	Belgium	Heers
August 24	Eneco Tour, Stage 7	UCI ProTour	Tony Martin (GER)	Belgium	Genk
August 24	Eneco Tour, Overall	UCI ProTour	Tony Martin (GER)	Belgium/Netherlands	
August 24	Eneco Tour, Young rider classification	UCI ProTour	Tony Martin (GER)	Belgium/Netherlands	
August 28	Vuelta a España, Stage 1	UCI World Ranking	Team time trial (Note: The riders on the squad were Mark Cavendish, Peter Velits, Martin Velits, Lars Bak, Hayden Roulston, Kanstantsin Sivtsov, Tejay van Garderen, Matthew Goss, and Bernhard Eisel)	Spain	Seville
September 9	Vuelta a España, Stage 12	UCI World Ranking	Mark Cavendish (GBR)	Spain	Lleida
September 10	Vuelta a España, Stage 13	UCI World Ranking	Mark Cavendish (GBR)	Spain	Burgos
September 11	Tour of Britain, Stage 1	UCI Europe Tour	André Greipel (GER)	Great Britain	Blackpool
September 13	Tour of Britain, Stage 3	UCI Europe Tour	Michael Albasini (SUI)	Great Britain	Swansea
September 15	Vuelta a España, Stage 17	UCI World Ranking	Peter Velits (SVK)	Spain	Peñafiel
September 16	Tour of Britain, Stage 6	UCI Europe Tour	André Greipel (GER)	Great Britain	Great Yarmouth
September 16	Vuelta a España, Stage 18	UCI World Ranking	Mark Cavendish (GBR)	Spain	Salamanca
September 17	Kampioenschap van Vlaanderen	UCI Europe Tour	Leigh Howard (AUS)	Belgium	Koolskamp
September 18	Tour of Britain, Stage 8	UCI Europe Tour	André Greipel (GER)	Great Britain	Newham
September 18	Tour of Britain, Overall	UCI Europe Tour	Michael Albasini (SUI)	Great Britain	
September 19	Vuelta a España, Points classification	UCI World Ranking	Mark Cavendish (GBR)	Spain	
September 19	Grand Prix d'Isbergues	UCI Europe Tour	Aleksejs Saramotins (LAT)	France	Isbergues
