= 2010 Tour de France, Prologue to Stage 10 =

Overview of the stages, showing the path from one host town to the next.

The 2010 Tour de France begins on 3 July in Rotterdam in the Netherlands with a prologue time trial, and stage 10 occurs on 14 July, with a medium mountain stage in Gap.

Legend
A yellow jersey	Denotes the leader of the general classification	A green jersey	Denotes the leader of the points classification
A polka-dot jersey	Denotes the leader of the mountains classification	A white jersey	Denotes the leader of the young rider classification
A jersey with a black rider number on a yellow background	Denotes a rider representing the leaders of the team classification	A jersey with a white rider number on a red background	Denotes the rider designated as the day's most combative
	s.t. indicates that the rider crossed the finish line in the same group as the one receiving the time above him, and was therefore credited with the same finishing time.		

== Prologue ==
3 July 2010 — Rotterdam (Netherlands), 8.9 km (5.5 mi) (individual time trial)

This time trial was short and nearly totally flat, with two very small rises in elevation (the first for the crossing of the Erasmus Bridge) occurring in the first half of the course. Tony Martin of Team HTC–Columbia led for most of the stage, being the eleventh person to complete the prologue. It was not until world time trial champion Fabian Cancellara, the second-to-last rider of the day, took the course that Martin's time was bettered. Rain showers plagued the middle portion of the stage, but for the riders who started at the end the rain had stopped and the course was primarily dry. This was Cancellara's fourth win in a time trial to start the Tour de France in his career. Martin's efforts did not go unrewarded; he was awarded the white jersey for best young rider.

Prologue result and general classification after prologue

Rank	Rider	Team	Time
1	Fabian Cancellara (SUI)	Team Saxo Bank	10' 00"
2	Tony Martin (GER)	Team HTC–Columbia	+ 10"
3	David Millar (GBR)	Garmin–Transitions	+ 20"
DSQ	~~Lance Armstrong (USA)~~	~~Team RadioShack~~	~~+ 22"~~
4	Geraint Thomas (GBR)	Team Sky	+ 23"
5	Alberto Contador (ESP)	Astana	+ 27"
6	Tyler Farrar (USA)	Garmin–Transitions	+ 28"
7	Levi Leipheimer (USA)	Team RadioShack	+ 28"
8	Edvald Boasson Hagen (NOR)	Team Sky	+ 32"
9	Linus Gerdemann (GER)	Team Milram	+ 35"

== Stage 1 ==
4 July 2010 — Rotterdam (Netherlands) to Brussels (Belgium), 223.5 km (138.9 mi)

This stage is flat, winding through the islands of Zeeland before heading south into Belgium before the finish in the nation's capital. It was thought that the winds from the North Sea would cause some mayhem for this very flat stage, but this did not happen. Just 100 m (330 ft) after the peloton passed the stage's true beginning three riders broke away from the pack. Those riders were Lars Boom of Rabobank, Maarten Wijnants of Quick-Step, and Euskaltel–Euskadi's Alan Pérez. The trio stayed in front of the peloton for over 170 km (110 mi). With about 30 km (19 mi) to go, Wijnants sprinted away from the other two breakaway members, who were quickly taken in by the charging peloton. Moldova road race champion Alexandre Pliușchin, representing Team Katusha, escaped from the peloton and joined Wijnants with about 25 km (16 mi) left in the stage. The two gained a maximum advantage of a minute over the peloton, and were caught with 8 km (5.0 mi) to go. As the peloton turned around a right hand bend, with under 3 km (1.9 mi) remaining, there was a small crash that took out two top sprinters, Mark Cavendish and Óscar Freire. Further crashes occurred in the stage's final kilometer, and riders high in the overall standings such as Lance Armstrong and Fabian Cancellara were caught up in them, along with many others. The few riders who were in front of the crash sprinted to the line, with Lampre–Farnese's Alessandro Petacchi claiming his first Tour de France stage win since 2003. Wijnants was named the most combative rider for Stage 1. All 158 riders who were together when the peloton passed through 3 km (1.9 mi) to go were given the same time regardless of when they actually finished.

Stage 1 result

Rank	Rider	Team	Time
1	Alessandro Petacchi (ITA)	Lampre–Farnese	5h 09' 38"
2	Mark Renshaw (AUS)	Team HTC–Columbia	s.t.
3	Thor Hushovd (NOR)	Cervélo TestTeam	s.t.
4	Robbie McEwen (AUS)	Team Katusha	s.t.
5	Mathieu Ladagnous (FRA)	FDJ	s.t.
6	Daniel Oss (ITA)	Liquigas–Doimo	+ 2"
7	José Joaquín Rojas (ESP)	Caisse d'Epargne	+ 2"
8	Christian Knees (GER)	Team Milram	+ 2"
9	Rubén Pérez (ESP)	Euskaltel–Euskadi	+ 2"
10	Jürgen Roelandts (BEL)	Omega Pharma–Lotto	+ 2"

General classification after stage 1

Rank	Rider	Team	Time
1	Fabian Cancellara (SUI)	Team Saxo Bank	5h 19' 38"
2	Tony Martin (GER)	Team HTC–Columbia	+ 10"
3	David Millar (GBR)	Garmin–Transitions	+ 20"
4	~~Lance Armstrong (USA)~~	~~Team RadioShack~~	~~+ 22"~~
5	Geraint Thomas (GBR)	Team Sky	+ 23"
6	Alberto Contador (ESP)	Astana	+ 27"
7	Tyler Farrar (USA)	Garmin–Transitions	+ 28"
8	Levi Leipheimer (USA)	Team RadioShack	+ 28"
9	Edvald Boasson Hagen (NOR)	Team Sky	+ 32"
10	Linus Gerdemann (GER)	Team Milram	+ 35"

== Stage 2 ==
5 July 2010 — Brussels (Belgium) to Spa (Belgium), 201 km (125 mi)

There are six categorized climbs in this stage, three each in the third and fourth categories. The finish comes off the descent of the Rosier Pass, visited 12 km (7.5 mi) before the conclusion of the stage. Just 10 km (6.2 mi) after passing through kilometer zero, an eight-man breakaway formed. The riders that made up the breakaway were Sylvain Chavanel and Jerome Pineau of Quick-Step, Matthew Lloyd and Jürgen Roelandts both from Omega Pharma–Lotto, BMC Racing Team's Marcus Burghardt, Sébastien Turgot of Bbox Bouygues Telecom, Rein Taaramäe Cofidis, and Lampre–Farnese's Francesco Gavazzi. As the breakaway passed through the classification four mountains Jerome Pineau picked up enough climbing points to earn the polka dot jersey at the end of the stage, and the first polka jersey of the Tour. By the time the breakaway reached the Stockeu Sylvain Chavanel was by himself, having dropped Jürgen Roelandts who later got reabsorbed into the peloton. As the peloton caught Burghardt, Team HTC–Columbia's Maxime Monfort jumped off the front of the peloton. On the descent of the Stockeu several crashes occurred. Francesco Gavazzi, who was reabsorbed by the peloton, slipped and fell to the ground causing a crash that took down GC contender Andy Schleck, the points competition leader Alessandro Petacchi, and most of the peloton. The riders that came out of the wreckage unscathed went on with the stage, but began to wait for the other riders that were involved in the crash. Most of the peloton regrouped, but they didn't try to chase down Sylvain Chavanel. While approaching the finish line the peloton caught Monfort, the only remaining escapee other than Chavanel. Fabian Cancellara called for the peloton to not go for the sprint finish, out of fairness to those who had crashed and concern for the safety of the riders who might contest the sprint. As a result, no sprint points were awarded at the finish except to Chavanel, the stage winner, who was not involved in the slowdown. This was his second career Tour de France stage victory, and along with the stage win he became the overall leader and the leader of the points classification.

Stage 2 result

Rank	Rider	Team	Time
1	Sylvain Chavanel (FRA)	Quick-Step	4h 40' 48"
2	Maxime Bouet (FRA)	Ag2r–La Mondiale	+ 3' 56"
3	Fabian Wegmann (GER)	Team Milram	+ 3' 56"
4	Robbie McEwen (AUS)	Team Katusha	+ 3' 56"
5	Christian Knees (GER)	Team Milram	+ 3' 56"
6	Jürgen Roelandts (BEL)	Omega Pharma–Lotto	+ 3' 56"
7	Thor Hushovd (NOR)	Cervélo TestTeam	+ 3' 56"
8	Linus Gerdemann (GER)	Team Milram	+ 3' 56"
9	Mathieu Ladagnous (FRA)	FDJ	+ 3' 56"
10	Bernhard Eisel (AUT)	Team HTC–Columbia	+ 3' 56"

General classification after stage 2

Rank	Rider	Team	Time
1	Sylvain Chavanel (FRA)	Quick-Step	10h 01' 25"
2	Fabian Cancellara (SUI)	Team Saxo Bank	+ 2' 57"
3	Tony Martin (GER)	Team HTC–Columbia	+ 3' 07"
4	David Millar (GBR)	Garmin–Transitions	+ 3' 17"
5	~~Lance Armstrong (USA)~~	~~Team RadioShack~~	~~+ 3' 19"~~
6	Geraint Thomas (GBR)	Team Sky	+ 3' 20"
7	Alberto Contador (ESP)	Astana	+ 3' 24"
8	Levi Leipheimer (USA)	Team RadioShack	+ 3' 25"
9	Edvald Boasson Hagen (NOR)	Team Sky	+ 3' 29"
10	Linus Gerdemann (GER)	Team Milram	+ 3' 32"

== Stage 3 ==
6 July 2010 – Wanze (Belgium) to Arenberg Porte du Hainaut, 213 km (132 mi)

This is a difficult stage, incorporating 13 km (8.1 mi) of cobblestones in seven cobbled sectors over the last 77.5 km (48.2 mi). The race entered France for the first time midway through the cobbled sections, where Damiano Cunego, David Zabriskie, and a few other riders were caught in a small pileup. 13 km (8.1 mi) into the stage, seven men jumped off the front of the peloton to form a breakaway. Steve Cummings of Team Sky, Ryder Hesjedal of Garmin–Transitions, Pavel Brutt of Team Katusha, Pierre Rolland of Bbox Bouygues Telecom, Team Milram's Roger Kluge, Stéphane Augé of Cofidis and Caisse d'Epargne's Imanol Erviti. The peloton and the breakaway passed over the first few sets of cobbles with no problem. Ryder Hesjedal soon jumped off the front of the breakaway, leaving the remaining to get picked up by the peloton. Then as Fabian Cancellara took the reins of the peloton and began to whip up the pace; a crash occurred. The crash took out most of the peloton, except for the few who were in front of Fränk Schleck. Fränk Schleck and a few other riders went to the ground, taking up the whole road. Later, Fränk Schleck would abandon the Tour with a broken collarbone.

As Cancellara, Cadel Evans, Andy Schleck, and Thor Hushovd sped away, the rest of the field was trying to pick their way around the pileup. This created some distance between the GC hopefuls, such as Alberto Contador and Lance Armstrong. Initially Contador was knocked off of his bike. As the whole field made its way past the wreckage there were now two pelotons. Armstrong was initially in the first bunch of riders, but dropped off the back after needing a front wheel change. Contador fought back to the first main field, which was further up the road than the second peloton. Armstrong charged back, only to join the second peloton, and ultimately lost two minutes of time to the winners, and one minute to Contador. Ryder Hesjedal was caught by the chase group, led by Cancellara, with 6.7 km (4.2 mi) to go in the stage. The group made its way to the line where Thor Hushovd won the stage, also taking the lead in the points classification. Cancellara took the overall lead back from Sylvain Chavanel. Over a minute later Alexander Vinokourov led the second group over the line, with Contador coming in a few seconds later due to a flat tyre. Two minutes after Hushovd crossed the line, the group containing Armstrong crossed the line.

Stage 3 result

Rank	Rider	Team	Time
1	Thor Hushovd (NOR)	Cervélo TestTeam	4h 49' 38"
2	Geraint Thomas (GBR)	Team Sky	s.t.
3	Cadel Evans (AUS)	BMC Racing Team	s.t.
4	Ryder Hesjedal (CAN)	Garmin–Transitions	s.t.
5	Andy Schleck (LUX)	Team Saxo Bank	s.t.
6	Fabian Cancellara (SUI)	Team Saxo Bank	s.t.
7	Johan Vansummeren (BEL)	Garmin–Transitions	+ 53"
8	Bradley Wiggins (GBR)	Team Sky	+ 53"
9	Jurgen Van den Broeck (BEL)	Omega Pharma–Lotto	+ 53"
10	Alexander Vinokourov (KAZ)	Astana	+ 53"

General classification after stage 3

Rank	Rider	Team	Time
1	Fabian Cancellara (SUI)	Team Saxo Bank	14h 54' 00"
2	Geraint Thomas (GBR)	Team Sky	+ 23"
3	Cadel Evans (AUS)	BMC Racing Team	+ 39"
4	Ryder Hesjedal (CAN)	Garmin–Transitions	+ 46"
5	Sylvain Chavanel (FRA)	Quick-Step	+ 1' 01"
6	Andy Schleck (LUX)	Team Saxo Bank	+ 1' 09"
7	Thor Hushovd (NOR)	Cervélo TestTeam	+ 1' 19"
8	Alexander Vinokourov (KAZ)	Astana	+ 1' 31"
9	Alberto Contador (ESP)	Astana	+ 1' 40"
10	Jurgen Van den Broeck (BEL)	Omega Pharma–Lotto	+ 1' 42"

== Stage 4 ==
7 July 2010 — Cambrai to Reims, 153.5 km (95.4 mi)

This stage is short and mostly flat, undulating gently for its duration and incorporating one fourth-category climb. The stage got off to a normal start, with a five-man group jumping off the front of the peloton to form a breakaway. Those five riders were Dimitri Champion of Ag2r–La Mondiale, Iban Mayoz of Footon–Servetto–Fuji, Nicolas Vogondy of Bbox Bouygues Telecom, Francis De Greef of Omega Pharma–Lotto and Euskaltel–Euskadi's Iñaki Isasi. The peloton would not let the breakaway gain more than three minutes advantage on them, but they stayed out in front until the final kilometres. The breakaway dropped De Greef with just under 6 km (3.7 mi) remaining in the stage. As the sprinters teams were gearing up for the sprint finish, they absorbed the remaining breakaway members. As the sprinters came to the line Alessandro Petacchi jumped off of Thor Hushovd's back wheel and sprinted to the line for the stage win.

Stage 4 result

Rank	Rider	Team	Time
1	Alessandro Petacchi (ITA)	Lampre–Farnese	3h 34' 55"
2	Julian Dean (NZL)	Garmin–Transitions	s.t.
3	Edvald Boasson Hagen (NOR)	Team Sky	s.t.
4	Robbie McEwen (AUS)	Team Katusha	s.t.
5	Robert Hunter (RSA)	Garmin–Transitions	s.t.
6	Sébastien Turgot (FRA)	Bbox Bouygues Telecom	s.t.
7	José Joaquín Rojas (ESP)	Caisse d'Epargne	s.t.
8	Daniel Oss (ITA)	Liquigas–Doimo	s.t.
9	Thor Hushovd (NOR)	Cervélo TestTeam	s.t.
10	Óscar Freire (ESP)	Rabobank	s.t.

General classification after stage 4

Rank	Rider	Team	Time
1	Fabian Cancellara (SUI)	Team Saxo Bank	18h 28' 55"
2	Geraint Thomas (GBR)	Team Sky	+ 23"
3	Cadel Evans (AUS)	BMC Racing Team	+ 39"
4	Ryder Hesjedal (CAN)	Garmin–Transitions	+ 46"
5	Sylvain Chavanel (FRA)	Quick-Step	+ 1' 01"
6	Andy Schleck (LUX)	Team Saxo Bank	+ 1' 09"
7	Thor Hushovd (NOR)	Cervélo TestTeam	+ 1' 19"
8	Alexander Vinokourov (KAZ)	Astana	+ 1' 31"
9	Alberto Contador (ESP)	Astana	+ 1' 40"
10	Jurgen Van den Broeck (BEL)	Omega Pharma–Lotto	+ 1' 42"

== Stage 5 ==
8 July 2010 — Épernay to Montargis, 187.5 km (116.5 mi)

This is another flat stage, with two fourth-category climbs occurring early on. Stage 5 got off to a normal start, 6 km into the stage the riders broke away from the peloton. Jurgen Van De Walle of Quick-Step, José Ivan Gutierrez Palacios of Caisse d'Epargne, and Cofidis's Julien El Fares made up the three man breakaway. The breakaway gained a maximum advantage of eight minutes before being pulled back in by the peloton. As the final kilometers were approaching, Van De Walle and El Fares were caught by the peloton. Gutierrez remained out in front for only a little while longer, until being caught. Then the sprinters teams fought for position. As the teams came down to the final stretch; Mark Renshaw lead out Mark Cavendish for the stage win. This was Cavendish's eleventh Tour de France stage win of his career.

Stage 5 result

Rank	Rider	Team	Time
1	Mark Cavendish (GBR)	Team HTC–Columbia	4h 30' 50"
2	Gerald Ciolek (GER)	Team Milram	s.t.
3	Edvald Boasson Hagen (NOR)	Team Sky	s.t.
4	José Joaquín Rojas (ESP)	Caisse d'Epargne	s.t.
5	Thor Hushovd (NOR)	Cervélo TestTeam	s.t.
6	Sébastien Turgot (FRA)	Bbox Bouygues Telecom	s.t.
7	Robbie McEwen (AUS)	Team Katusha	s.t.
8	Alessandro Petacchi (ITA)	Lampre–Farnese	s.t.
9	Lloyd Mondory (FRA)	Ag2r–La Mondiale	s.t.
10	Tyler Farrar (USA)	Garmin–Transitions	s.t.

General classification after stage 5

Rank	Rider	Team	Time
1	Fabian Cancellara (SUI)	Team Saxo Bank	22h 59' 45"
2	Geraint Thomas (GBR)	Team Sky	+ 23"
3	Cadel Evans (AUS)	BMC Racing Team	+ 39"
4	Ryder Hesjedal (CAN)	Garmin–Transitions	+ 46"
5	Sylvain Chavanel (FRA)	Quick-Step	+ 1' 01"
6	Andy Schleck (LUX)	Team Saxo Bank	+ 1' 09"
7	Thor Hushovd (NOR)	Cervélo TestTeam	+ 1' 19"
8	Alexander Vinokourov (KAZ)	Astana	+ 1' 31"
9	Alberto Contador (ESP)	Astana	+ 1' 40"
10	Jurgen Van den Broeck (BEL)	Omega Pharma–Lotto	+ 1' 42"

== Stage 6 ==
9 July 2010 — Montargis to Gueugnon, 227.5 km (141.4 mi)

This stage is also classified flat, though it contains a bit more climbing than the previous stages. There are four fourth-category climbs on the course, and other less steep uncategorized rises. Just 3 km after passing through kilometer zero a three-man breakaway formed. Those three riders were Mathieu Perget of Caisse d'Epargne, Sebastian Lang of Omega Pharma–Lotto and Euskaltel–Euskadi's Rubén Pérez. The breakaway would gain a maximum advantage of eight minutes on the day. As the stage went on the gap slowly went down and the sprinters teams started preparing for a sprint finish. With 20 km to go in the stage Dimitri Champion of Ag2r–La Mondiale and Anthony Charteau of Bbox Bouygues Telecom broke away from the peloton and joined the breakaway. The two riders would help stretch out the gap between the breakaway and the peloton, but not for long. The sprinters teams reeled in the breakaway just after passing under the 10 km to go banner. Then the sprinters and their lead out trains came to the front for the sprint finish. Mark Renshaw led out Mark Cavendish for his second consecutive stage win. Carlos Barredo and Rui Costa came to blows after the stage.

Stage 6 result

Rank	Rider	Team	Time
1	Mark Cavendish (GBR)	Team HTC–Columbia	5h 37' 42"
2	Tyler Farrar (USA)	Garmin–Transitions	s.t.
3	Alessandro Petacchi (ITA)	Lampre–Farnese	s.t.
4	Robbie McEwen (AUS)	Team Katusha	s.t.
5	Gerald Ciolek (GER)	Team Milram	s.t.
6	Sébastien Turgot (FRA)	Bbox Bouygues Telecom	s.t.
7	José Joaquín Rojas (ESP)	Caisse d'Epargne	s.t.
8	Edvald Boasson Hagen (NOR)	Team Sky	s.t.
9	Robert Hunter (RSA)	Garmin–Transitions	s.t.
10	Thor Hushovd (NOR)	Cervélo TestTeam	s.t.

General classification after stage 6

Rank	Rider	Team	Time
1	Fabian Cancellara (SUI)	Team Saxo Bank	28h 37' 30"
2	Geraint Thomas (GBR)	Team Sky	+ 20"
3	Cadel Evans (AUS)	BMC Racing Team	+ 39"
4	Ryder Hesjedal (CAN)	Garmin–Transitions	+ 46"
5	Sylvain Chavanel (FRA)	Quick-Step	+ 1' 01"
6	Andy Schleck (LUX)	Team Saxo Bank	+ 1' 09"
7	Thor Hushovd (NOR)	Cervélo TestTeam	+ 1' 16"
8	Alexander Vinokourov (KAZ)	Astana	+ 1' 31"
9	Alberto Contador (ESP)	Astana	+ 1' 40"
10	Jurgen Van den Broeck (BEL)	Omega Pharma–Lotto	+ 1' 42"

== Stage 7 ==
10 July 2010 — Tournus to Station des Rousses, 165.5 km (102.8 mi)

The Tour's first stage in the mountains has six climbs in the Jura, three in the second category, two in the third, and one in the fourth. The two most difficult climbs are the last two, the Col de la Croix de la Serra and the Lamoura, both second-category climbs reaching over 1,000 m (3,300 ft) in elevation. 4 km (2.5 mi) of flat racing follow the Lamoura climb before the stage finish. After numerous failed attempts at forming a breakaway; a five-man breakaway formed 2 km into the stage. The breakaway was composed of Danilo Hondo of Lampre–Farnese, Samuel Dumoulin of Cofidis, Rubén Pérez of Euskaltel–Euskadi, Christian Knees of Team Milram, and King of the Mountains classification leader Jérôme Pineau of Quick-Step. Hondo crossed the first three intermediate sprints of the stage first. Sylvain Chavanel crossed the fourth and final intermediate sprint of the stage first. Pineau crossed the first five classified mountains first, increasing his lead in the King of the Mountains classification. On the ascent of the second to last climb of the day, the Col de la Croix de la Serra, everyone started attacking and other riders started to fall off the back of the peloton at an alarming rate. When the peloton reached the penultimate climb a large group of riders jumped off the front of the peloton to chase after Pineau and the slowing Hondo. When the breakaway reached the final mountain the breakaway only contained two riders, Pineau and Hondo. On the final climb Pineau had climbed away from Hondo; who was beginning to crack. Sylvain Chavanel was a member of the chase group that broke away from the peloton on the Col de la Croix de la Serra. Chavanel attacked and started gaining ground fast, he quickly caught Hondo and then his own teammate Pineau. Chavanel would go on by himself to claim the stage win, his second of this year's Tour, and the maillot jaune. Pineau won the most combative rider of Stage 7.

Stage 7 result

Rank	Rider	Team	Time
1	Sylvain Chavanel (FRA)	Quick-Step	4h 22' 52"
2	Rafael Valls (ESP)	Footon–Servetto–Fuji	+ 57"
3	Juan Manuel Gárate (ESP)	Rabobank	+ 1' 27"
4	Thomas Voeckler (FRA)	Bbox Bouygues Telecom	+ 1' 40"
5	Mathieu Perget (FRA)	Caisse d'Epargne	+ 1' 40"
6	Daniel Moreno (ESP)	Omega Pharma–Lotto	+ 1' 40"
7	Pierrick Fédrigo (FRA)	Bbox Bouygues Telecom	+ 1' 47"
8	Ryder Hesjedal (CAN)	Garmin–Transitions	+ 1' 47"
9	Rubén Plaza (ESP)	Caisse d'Epargne	+ 1' 47"
10	Eros Capecchi (ITA)	Footon–Servetto–Fuji	+ 1' 47"

General classification after stage 7

Rank	Rider	Team	Time
1	Sylvain Chavanel (FRA)	Quick-Step	33h 01' 23"
2	Cadel Evans (AUS)	BMC Racing Team	+ 1' 25"
3	Ryder Hesjedal (CAN)	Garmin–Transitions	+ 1' 32"
4	Andy Schleck (LUX)	Team Saxo Bank	+ 1' 55"
5	Alexander Vinokourov (KAZ)	Astana	+ 2' 17"
6	Alberto Contador (ESP)	Astana	+ 2' 26"
7	Jurgen Van den Broeck (BEL)	Omega Pharma–Lotto	+ 2' 28"
8	Nicolas Roche (IRL)	Ag2r–La Mondiale	+ 2' 28"
9	Johan Vansummeren (BEL)	Garmin–Transitions	+ 2' 33"
10	Denis Menchov (RUS)	Rabobank	+ 2' 35"

== Stage 8 ==
11 July 2010 — Station des Rousses to Morzine-Avoriaz, 189 km (117 mi)

Stage 8 was the Tour's first taste of the Alps. Starting at the previous day's concluding town of Station des Rousses, the stage incorporated two Category 1 climbs: the Col de la Ramaz which crested with 35 km (22 mi) left to race and the summit finish at Morzine-Avoriaz. As the stage wore on, groups began form off the back of the peloton. Team Sky set a blistering pace on the ascent of the Les Gets, this caused a group of elite riders to form a trailing group. Soon Lance Armstrong, after crashing twice in the stage, dropped off the back of the peloton. Once word reached Astana they took control of the lead elite group, whipping up the pace. This group contained Alberto Contador, Andy Schleck, Cadel Evans, and about 30 others. Once the group reached the flamme rouge, attacks began, aiming at the stage win. Andy Schleck attacked, with Samuel Sánchez trailing him. Schleck out-sprinted Sánchez at the finish for his first Tour stage win. Cadel Evans took the yellow jersey gaining from Sylvain Chavanel.

Stage 8 result

Rank	Rider	Team	Time
1	Andy Schleck (LUX)	Team Saxo Bank	4h 54' 11"
2	Samuel Sánchez (ESP)	Euskaltel–Euskadi	s.t.
3	Robert Gesink (NED)	Rabobank	+ 10"
4	Roman Kreuziger (CZE)	Liquigas–Doimo	+ 10"
5	Alberto Contador (ESP)	Astana	+ 10"
6	Cadel Evans (AUS)	BMC Racing Team	+ 10"
7	Jurgen Van den Broeck (BEL)	Omega Pharma–Lotto	+ 10"
8	Levi Leipheimer (USA)	Team RadioShack	+ 10"
9	Ivan Basso (ITA)	Liquigas–Doimo	+ 10"
10	Denis Menchov (RUS)	Rabobank	+ 10"

General classification after stage 8

Rank	Rider	Team	Time
1	Cadel Evans (AUS)	BMC Racing Team	37h 57' 09"
2	Andy Schleck (LUX)	Team Saxo Bank	+ 20"
3	Alberto Contador (ESP)	Astana	+ 1' 01"
4	Jurgen Van den Broeck (BEL)	Omega Pharma–Lotto	+ 1' 03"
5	Denis Menchov (RUS)	Rabobank	+ 1' 10"
6	Ryder Hesjedal (CAN)	Garmin–Transitions	+ 1' 11"
7	Roman Kreuziger (CZE)	Liquigas–Doimo	+ 1' 45"
8	Levi Leipheimer (USA)	Team RadioShack	+ 2' 14"
9	Samuel Sánchez (ESP)	Euskaltel–Euskadi	+ 2' 15"
10	Michael Rogers (AUS)	Team HTC–Columbia	+ 2' 31"

== Stage 9 ==
13 July 2010 — Morzine-Avoriaz to Saint-Jean-de-Maurienne, 204.5 km (127.1 mi)

After the first rest day, at Morzine-Avoriaz, the next Alpine stage contains one of this Tour's hardest climbs, the hors catégorie Col de la Madeleine. The Col de la Colombière and the Col des Saisies, both first-category, are visited earlier in the stage, and the finish line comes after the descent from the Madeleine and a short flat section.

Stage 9 result

Rank	Rider	Team	Time
1	Sandy Casar (FRA)	FDJ	5h 38' 10"
2	Luis León Sánchez (ESP)	Caisse d'Epargne	s.t.
3	Damiano Cunego (ITA)	Lampre–Farnese	s.t.
4	Christophe Moreau (FRA)	Caisse d'Epargne	+ 2"
5	Anthony Charteau (FRA)	Bbox Bouygues Telecom	+ 2"
6	Alberto Contador (ESP)	Astana	+ 2"
7	Andy Schleck (LUX)	Team Saxo Bank	+ 2"
8	Samuel Sánchez (ESP)	Euskaltel–Euskadi	+ 52"
9	Joaquim Rodríguez (ESP)	Team Katusha	+ 2' 07"
10	Levi Leipheimer (USA)	Team RadioShack	+ 2' 07"

General classification after stage 9

Rank	Rider	Team	Time
1	Andy Schleck (LUX)	Team Saxo Bank	43h 35' 41"
2	Alberto Contador (ESP)	Astana	+ 41"
3	Samuel Sánchez (ESP)	Euskaltel–Euskadi	+ 2' 45"
4	Denis Menchov (RUS)	Rabobank	+ 2' 58"
5	Jurgen Van den Broeck (BEL)	Omega Pharma–Lotto	+ 3' 31"
6	Levi Leipheimer (USA)	Team RadioShack	+ 3' 59"
7	Robert Gesink (NED)	Rabobank	+ 4' 22"
8	Luis León Sánchez (ESP)	Caisse d'Epargne	+ 4' 41"
9	Joaquim Rodríguez (ESP)	Team Katusha	+ 5' 08"
10	Ivan Basso (ITA)	Liquigas–Doimo	+ 5' 09"

== Stage 10 ==
14 July 2010 — Chambéry to Gap, 179 km (111 mi)

The Bastille Day stage gives a last taste of the Alps for the 2010 Tour. There are three categorized climbs on course, starting with first-category Côte de Laffrey, and finishing with the second-category Col du Noyer; the tallest of them all. The finish into Gap is on a descent, from the Noyer and then from an uncategorized hill. Numerous breakaways tried to form, but none were successful at the beginning of the stage. 36 km into the stage a breakaway finally got clear of the peloton. The break contained Mario Aerts of Omega Pharma–Lotto, Dries Devenyns of Quick-Step, Vasil Kiryienka of Caisse d'Epargne, and Team RadioShack's Sérgio Paulinho. The breakaway was later joined by two Frenchmen, Maxime Bouet of Ag2r–La Mondiale and Pierre Rolland of Bbox Bouygues Telecom. No one in the breakaway was seen as a threat to Andy Schleck, the new wearer of the maillot jaune. The closest rider to him in the break was thirty minutes behind at the start of the stage. The peloton did not really make an effort to catch the breakaway, letting the breakaway's advantage rise to the twelve-minute mark for most of the stage. As the breakaway passed under the 10 km to go banner, the breakaway members began to attack. The first attack was by Devenyns, but he was soon passed. Paulinho sprinted in front of Devenyns, and Kiryienka followed closely behind. The two would gain a minutes advantage over the other riders that were in the chase group. As the finish approached Paulinho sprinted from behind Kiryienka to grab the stage win. Jerome Pineau reclaimed the lead in the King of the Mountains Classification by one point.

Stage 10 result

Rank	Rider	Team	Time
1	Sérgio Paulinho (POR)	Team RadioShack	5h 10' 56"
2	Vasil Kiryienka (BLR)	Caisse d'Epargne	s.t.
3	Dries Devenyns (BEL)	Quick-Step	+ 1' 29"
4	Pierre Rolland (FRA)	Bbox Bouygues Telecom	+ 1' 29"
5	Mario Aerts (BEL)	Omega Pharma–Lotto	+ 1' 33"
6	Maxime Bouet (FRA)	Ag2r–La Mondiale	+ 3' 20"
7	Nicolas Roche (IRL)	Ag2r–La Mondiale	+ 12' 58"
8	Rémi Pauriol (FRA)	Cofidis	+ 13' 57"
9	Mark Cavendish (GBR)	Team HTC–Columbia	+ 14' 19"
10	Alessandro Petacchi (ITA)	Lampre–Farnese	+ 14' 19"

General classification after stage 10

Rank	Rider	Team	Time
1	Andy Schleck (LUX)	Team Saxo Bank	49h 00' 56"
2	Alberto Contador (ESP)	Astana	+ 41"
3	Samuel Sánchez (ESP)	Euskaltel–Euskadi	+ 2' 45"
4	Denis Menchov (RUS)	Rabobank	+ 2' 58"
5	Jurgen Van den Broeck (BEL)	Omega Pharma–Lotto	+ 3' 31"
6	Levi Leipheimer (USA)	Team RadioShack	+ 3' 59"
7	Robert Gesink (NED)	Rabobank	+ 4' 22"
8	Luis León Sánchez (ESP)	Caisse d'Epargne	+ 4' 41"
9	Joaquim Rodríguez (ESP)	Team Katusha	+ 5' 08"
10	Ivan Basso (ITA)	Liquigas–Doimo	+ 5' 09"
