= 2010 Tour de France, Stage 11 to Stage 20 =

Overview of the stages, showing the path from one host town to the next.

Stage 11 of the 2010 Tour de France occurs on 15 July in Sisteron, and the race concludes on 25 July with its traditional Champs-Élysées stage.

Legend
A yellow jersey	Denotes the leader of the general classification	A green jersey	Denotes the leader of the points classification
A polka-dot jersey	Denotes the leader of the mountains classification	A white jersey	Denotes the leader of the young rider classification
	s.t. indicates that the rider crossed the finish line in the same group as the one receiving the time above him, and was therefore credited with the same finishing time.		

== Stage 11 ==
15 July 2010 — Sisteron to Bourg-lès-Valence, 184.5 km (114.6 mi)

This is classified as a flat stage, visiting the third-category Col de la Cabre after 56.5 km (35.1 mi) and then descending most of the way to the finish. The stage got off to a normal start with a three-man breakaway forming just after passing through kilometer zero. The three riders were Stéphane Augé of Cofidis, Anthony Geslin of Française des Jeux, and Footon–Servetto–Fuji's José Alberto Benítez. The breakaway would stay out in front for the majority of the stage, but they were absorbed by the peloton with 25 km (15.5 mi) to go. Now it was time for the sprinters, but Team Saxo Bank took control of the peloton and pushed the tempo up to 62 km/h. Then the sprinters' teams came to the front and started the dash to the line. Mark Renshaw led out Mark Cavendish for the thirteenth Tour de France stage win of his career. In a controversial decision Renshaw was disqualified and forced to abandon the Tour for head butting Julian Dean during the sprint and for moving into Tyler Farrar's line.

Stage 11 result

Rank	Rider	Team	Time
1	Mark Cavendish (GBR)	Team HTC–Columbia	4h 42' 29"
2	Alessandro Petacchi (ITA)	Lampre–Farnese	s.t.
3	Tyler Farrar (USA)	Garmin–Transitions	s.t.
4	José Joaquín Rojas (ESP)	Caisse d'Epargne	s.t.
5	Robbie McEwen (AUS)	Team Katusha	s.t.
6	Yukiya Arashiro (JPN)	Bbox Bouygues Telecom	s.t.
7	Thor Hushovd (NOR)	Cervélo TestTeam	s.t.
8	Lloyd Mondory (FRA)	Ag2r–La Mondiale	s.t.
9	Jürgen Roelandts (BEL)	Omega Pharma–Lotto	s.t.
10	Gerald Ciolek (GER)	Team Milram	s.t.

General classification after stage 11

Rank	Rider	Team	Time
1	Andy Schleck (LUX)	Team Saxo Bank	53h 43' 25"
2	Alberto Contador (ESP)	Astana	+ 41"
3	Samuel Sánchez (ESP)	Euskaltel–Euskadi	+ 2' 45"
4	Denis Menchov (RUS)	Rabobank	+ 2' 58"
5	Jurgen Van den Broeck (BEL)	Omega Pharma–Lotto	+ 3' 31"
6	Levi Leipheimer (USA)	Team RadioShack	+ 3' 59"
7	Robert Gesink (NED)	Rabobank	+ 4' 22"
8	Luis León Sánchez (ESP)	Caisse d'Epargne	+ 4' 41"
9	Joaquim Rodríguez (ESP)	Team Katusha	+ 5' 08"
10	Ivan Basso (ITA)	Liquigas–Doimo	+ 5' 09"

== Stage 12 ==
16 July 2010 — Bourg-de-Péage to Mende, 210.5 km (130.8 mi)

This stage is hilly, with two second-category and three third-category climbs. The Col de la Croix Neuve comes 2 km (1.2 mi) from the finish, followed by a brief flat section. The peloton remained intact up until the second categorized climb of the day, before a group of eighteen riders dashed away from the peloton. Some major riders were Thor Hushovd of Cervélo TestTeam, Andreas Klöden of Team RadioShack, and Alexander Vinokourov of Astana. Hushovd regained the lead in the points classification after winning the second intermediate sprint of the day. With about 48 km to go in the stage Klöden, Vinokourov, Garmin–Transitions's Ryder Hesjedal, and Vasil Kiryienka of Caisse d'Epargne jumped off the front of the breakaway. The group would stay intact until the final climb of the day where Vinokourov would attack on the climb. While on the climb Alberto Contador attacked, which caught Andy Schleck off guard. Joaquim Rodríguez followed Contador, who quickly caught up to the leading Vinokourov. Contador and Rodriguez would go to the finish together, with Rodriguez outsprinting Contador for the stage win. Contador gained ten seconds on Schleck.

Stage 12 result

Rank	Rider	Team	Time
1	Joaquim Rodríguez (ESP)	Team Katusha	4h 58' 26"
2	Alberto Contador (ESP)	Astana	s.t.
3	Alexander Vinokourov (KAZ)	Astana	+ 4"
4	Jurgen Van den Broeck (BEL)	Omega Pharma–Lotto	+ 10"
5	Andy Schleck (LUX)	Team Saxo Bank	+ 10"
6	Samuel Sánchez (ESP)	Euskaltel–Euskadi	+ 10"
7	Andreas Klöden (GER)	Team RadioShack	+ 10"
8	Denis Menchov (RUS)	Rabobank	+ 10"
9	Robert Gesink (NED)	Rabobank	+ 15"
10	Roman Kreuziger (CZE)	Liquigas–Doimo	+ 15"

General classification after stage 12

Rank	Rider	Team	Time
1	Andy Schleck (LUX)	Team Saxo Bank	58h 42' 01"
2	Alberto Contador (ESP)	Astana	+ 31"
3	Samuel Sánchez (ESP)	Euskaltel–Euskadi	+ 2' 45"
4	Denis Menchov (RUS)	Rabobank	+ 2' 58"
5	Jurgen Van den Broeck (BEL)	Omega Pharma–Lotto	+ 3' 31"
6	Levi Leipheimer (USA)	Team RadioShack	+ 4' 06"
7	Robert Gesink (NED)	Rabobank	+ 4' 27"
8	Joaquim Rodríguez (ESP)	Team Katusha	+ 4' 58"
9	Luis León Sánchez (ESP)	Caisse d'Epargne	+ 5' 02"
10	Roman Kreuziger (CZE)	Liquigas–Doimo	+ 5' 16"

== Stage 13 ==
17 July 2010 — Rodez to Revel, 196 km (122 mi)

This is classified as a flat stage, though it incorporates five climbs, two in the third category and three in the fourth.

Stage 13 result

Rank	Rider	Team	Time
1	Alexander Vinokourov (KAZ)	Astana	4h 26' 26"
2	Mark Cavendish (GBR)	Team HTC–Columbia	+ 13"
3	Alessandro Petacchi (ITA)	Lampre–Farnese	+ 13"
4	Edvald Boasson Hagen (NOR)	Team Sky	+ 13"
5	José Joaquín Rojas (ESP)	Caisse d'Epargne	+ 13"
6	Julian Dean (NZL)	Garmin–Transitions	+ 13"
7	Anthony Geslin (FRA)	FDJ	+ 13"
8	Thor Hushovd (NOR)	Cervélo TestTeam	+ 13"
9	Grega Bole (SLO)	Lampre–Farnese	+ 13"
10	Lloyd Mondory (FRA)	Ag2r–La Mondiale	+ 13"

General classification after stage 13

Rank	Rider	Team	Time
1	Andy Schleck (LUX)	Team Saxo Bank	63h 08' 40"
2	Alberto Contador (ESP)	Astana	+ 31"
3	Samuel Sánchez (ESP)	Euskaltel–Euskadi	+ 2' 45"
4	Denis Menchov (RUS)	Rabobank	+ 2' 58"
5	Jurgen Van den Broeck (BEL)	Omega Pharma–Lotto	+ 3' 31"
6	Levi Leipheimer (USA)	Team RadioShack	+ 4' 06"
7	Robert Gesink (NED)	Rabobank	+ 4' 27"
8	Joaquim Rodríguez (ESP)	Team Katusha	+ 4' 58"
9	Luis León Sánchez (ESP)	Caisse d'Epargne	+ 5' 02"
10	Roman Kreuziger (CZE)	Liquigas–Doimo	+ 5' 16"

== Stage 14 ==
18 July 2010 — Revel to Ax 3 Domaines, 184.5 km (114.6 mi)

The first of several difficult stages in the Pyrenees in the Tour's last week visits the French Basque Country. The hors catégorie Port de Pailhères precedes the first-category summit finish at Ax-3-Domaines.

Stage 14 result

Rank	Rider	Team	Time
1	Christophe Riblon (FRA)	Ag2r–La Mondiale	4h 52' 42"
2	Denis Menchov (RUS)	Rabobank	+ 54"
3	Samuel Sánchez (ESP)	Euskaltel–Euskadi	+ 54"
4	Andy Schleck (LUX)	Team Saxo Bank	+ 1' 08"
5	Joaquim Rodríguez (ESP)	Team Katusha	+ 1' 08"
6	Robert Gesink (NED)	Rabobank	+ 1' 08"
7	Alberto Contador (ESP)	Astana	+ 1' 08"
8	Jurgen Van den Broeck (BEL)	Omega Pharma–Lotto	+ 1' 08"
9	Damiano Cunego (ITA)	Lampre–Farnese	+ 1' 49"
10	Carlos Sastre (ESP)	Cervélo TestTeam	+ 1' 49"

General classification after stage 14

Rank	Rider	Team	Time
1	Andy Schleck (LUX)	Team Saxo Bank	68h 02' 30"
2	Alberto Contador (ESP)	Astana	+ 31"
3	Samuel Sánchez (ESP)	Euskaltel–Euskadi	+ 2' 31"
4	Denis Menchov (RUS)	Rabobank	+ 2' 44"
5	Jurgen Van den Broeck (BEL)	Omega Pharma–Lotto	+ 3' 31"
6	Robert Gesink (NED)	Rabobank	+ 4' 27"
7	Levi Leipheimer (USA)	Team RadioShack	+ 4' 51"
8	Joaquim Rodríguez (ESP)	Team Katusha	+ 4' 58"
9	Luis León Sánchez (ESP)	Caisse d'Epargne	+ 5' 56"
10	Ivan Basso (ITA)	Liquigas–Doimo	+ 6' 52"

== Stage 15 ==
19 July 2010 — Pamiers to Bagnères-de-Luchon, 187.5 km (116.5 mi)

This stage also includes an hors catégorie climb, Port de Balès. The finish comes on a steep, 21 km (13 mi) descent from the climb.

In Stage 15, controversy arose when Alberto Contador took advantage of a mechanical problem that Andy Schleck had at a pivotal moment to take the yellow jersey, as it is considered good sportsmanship to wait for the yellow jersey when he has technical trouble. Contador explained that he did not know that Schleck had technical trouble, and that he had already launched an attack by then. Hours later, he apologised for the incident. Although he was loudly booed by sections of the crowd when he received the yellow jersey on the podium and was criticised by Sean Kelly and a number of riders both past and current, he also found support from the likes of Bernard Hinault, Miguel Induráin, Eddy Merckx and Laurent Jalabert. Schleck himself said that he and Contador discussed the matter during the next stage and that the matter has been resolved.

Stage 15 result

Rank	Rider	Team	Time
1	Thomas Voeckler (FRA)	Bbox Bouygues Telecom	4h 44' 51"
2	Alessandro Ballan (ITA)	BMC Racing Team	+ 1' 20"
3	Aitor Pérez (ESP)	Footon–Servetto–Fuji	+ 1' 20"
4	Lloyd Mondory (FRA)	Ag2r–La Mondiale	+ 2' 50"
5	Luke Roberts (AUS)	Team Milram	+ 2' 50"
6	Francesco Reda (ITA)	Quick-Step	+ 2' 50"
7	Alberto Contador (ESP)	Astana	+ 2' 50"
8	Samuel Sánchez (ESP)	Euskaltel–Euskadi	+ 2' 50"
9	Denis Menchov (RUS)	Rabobank	+ 2' 50"
10	Brian Vandborg (DEN)	Liquigas–Doimo	+ 2' 50"

General classification after stage 15

Rank	Rider	Team	Time
1	Alberto Contador (ESP)	Astana	72h 50' 42"
2	Andy Schleck (LUX)	Team Saxo Bank	+ 8"
3	Samuel Sánchez (ESP)	Euskaltel–Euskadi	+ 2' 00"
4	Denis Menchov (RUS)	Rabobank	+ 2' 13"
5	Jurgen Van den Broeck (BEL)	Omega Pharma–Lotto	+ 3' 39"
6	Robert Gesink (NED)	Rabobank	+ 5' 01"
7	Levi Leipheimer (USA)	Team RadioShack	+ 5' 25"
8	Joaquim Rodríguez (ESP)	Team Katusha	+ 5' 45"
9	Alexander Vinokourov (KAZ)	Astana	+ 7' 12"
10	Ryder Hesjedal (CAN)	Garmin–Transitions	+ 7' 51"

== Stage 16 ==
20 July 2010 — Bagnères-de-Luchon to Pau, 199.5 km (124.0 mi)

This stage has four difficult climbs, starting with the first-category Col de Peyresourde and Col d'Aspin within the first 42.5 km (26.4 mi). The next climb is the Col du Tourmalet, the first of two times the climb is visited in this Tour, and later comes the Col d'Aubisque. Both the Tourmalet and the Aubisque are hors catégorie climbs.

Stage 16 result

Rank	Rider	Team	Time
1	Pierrick Fédrigo (FRA)	Bbox Bouygues Telecom	5h 31' 43"
2	Sandy Casar (FRA)	FDJ	s.t.
3	Rubén Plaza (ESP)	Caisse d'Epargne	s.t.
4	Damiano Cunego (ITA)	Lampre–Farnese	s.t.
5	Chris Horner (USA)	Team RadioShack	s.t.
DSQ	~~Lance Armstrong (USA)~~	~~Team RadioShack~~	~~s.t.~~
6	Jurgen Van de Walle (BEL)	Quick-Step	s.t.
7	Christophe Moreau (FRA)	Caisse d'Epargne	s.t.
DSQ	~~Carlos Barredo (ESP)~~	~~Quick-Step~~	~~+ 28"~~
9	Thor Hushovd (NOR)	Cervélo TestTeam	+ 6' 45"

General classification after stage 16

Rank	Rider	Team	Time
1	Alberto Contador (ESP)	Astana	78h 29' 10"
2	Andy Schleck (LUX)	Team Saxo Bank	+ 8"
3	Samuel Sánchez (ESP)	Euskaltel–Euskadi	+ 2' 00"
4	Denis Menchov (RUS)	Rabobank	+ 2' 13"
5	Jurgen Van den Broeck (BEL)	Omega Pharma–Lotto	+ 3' 39"
6	Robert Gesink (NED)	Rabobank	+ 5' 01"
7	Levi Leipheimer (USA)	Team RadioShack	+ 5' 25"
8	Joaquim Rodríguez (ESP)	Team Katusha	+ 5' 45"
9	Alexander Vinokourov (KAZ)	Astana	+ 7' 12"
10	Ryder Hesjedal (CAN)	Garmin–Transitions	+ 7' 51"

== Stage 17 ==
22 July 2010 — Pau to Col du Tourmalet, 174 km (108 mi)

The Tour's second rest day occurs in Pau, meaning the Tour will have been in the same town for three straight days. This has been called the Tour's queen stage, and features the second ascent of the Tourmalet, coming as a steep summit finish. The first-category Col de Marie-Blanque and Col du Soulor climbs precede it. Anthony Charteau provisionally sealed the Polka-dot Jersey, as neither he nor Christophe Moreau accumulated any points during this stage, which featured the final categorized climbs of this year's Tour. The stage itself turned into a thrilling battle between Andy Schleck and Alberto Contador. With Schleck needing to make up lost time on Contador, he launched numerous attacks in the final 15 kilometres. However, surrounded by his fans, Contador fought to stay on the wheel of Schleck. Late on, Contador attacked himself but was pulled back. Schleck went on to take the stage, but Contador, who was happy to follow Schleck and did not sprint, had a seemingly unassailable lead.

Stage 17 result

Rank	Rider	Team	Time
1	Andy Schleck (LUX)	Team Saxo Bank	5h 03' 29"
DSQ	~~Alberto Contador (ESP)~~	~~Astana~~	~~s.t.~~
2	Joaquim Rodríguez (ESP)	Team Katusha	+ 1' 18"
3	Ryder Hesjedal (CAN)	Garmin–Transitions	+ 1' 27"
4	Samuel Sánchez (ESP)	Euskaltel–Euskadi	+ 1' 32"
5	Denis Menchov (RUS)	Rabobank	+ 1' 40"
6	Robert Gesink (NED)	Rabobank	+ 1' 40"
7	Chris Horner (USA)	Team RadioShack	+ 1' 45"
8	Jurgen Van den Broeck (BEL)	Omega Pharma–Lotto	+ 1' 48"
9	Roman Kreuziger (CZE)	Liquigas–Doimo	+ 2' 14"

General classification after stage 17

Rank	Rider	Team	Time
1	~~Alberto Contador (ESP)~~	~~Astana~~	~~83h 32' 39"~~
2	Andy Schleck (LUX)	Team Saxo Bank	+ 8"
3	Samuel Sánchez (ESP)	Euskaltel–Euskadi	+ 3' 32"
4	Denis Menchov (RUS)	Rabobank	+ 3' 53"
5	Jurgen Van den Broeck (BEL)	Omega Pharma–Lotto	+ 5' 27"
6	Robert Gesink (NED)	Rabobank	+ 6' 41"
7	Joaquim Rodríguez (ESP)	Team Katusha	+ 7' 03"
8	Ryder Hesjedal (CAN)	Garmin–Transitions	+ 9' 18"
9	Roman Kreuziger (CZE)	Liquigas–Doimo	+ 10' 12"
10	Chris Horner (USA)	Team RadioShack	+ 10' 37"

== Stage 18 ==
23 July 2010 — Salies-de-Béarn to Bordeaux, 198 km (123 mi)

This was a flat stage.

Stage 18 result

Rank	Rider	Team	Time
1	Mark Cavendish (GBR)	Team HTC–Columbia	4h 37' 09"
2	Julian Dean (NZL)	Garmin–Transitions	s.t.
3	Alessandro Petacchi (ITA)	Lampre–Farnese	s.t.
4	Robbie McEwen (AUS)	Team Katusha	s.t.
5	Óscar Freire (ESP)	Rabobank	s.t.
6	Edvald Boasson Hagen (NOR)	Team Sky	s.t.
7	Jürgen Roelandts (BEL)	Omega Pharma–Lotto	s.t.
8	José Joaquín Rojas (ESP)	Caisse d'Epargne	s.t.
9	Grega Bole (SLO)	Lampre–Farnese	s.t.
10	Rubén Pérez (ESP)	Euskaltel–Euskadi	s.t.

General classification after stage 18

Rank	Rider	Team	Time
1	~~Alberto Contador (ESP)~~	~~Astana~~	~~88h 09' 48"~~
2	Andy Schleck (LUX)	Team Saxo Bank	+ 8"
3	Samuel Sánchez (ESP)	Euskaltel–Euskadi	+ 3' 32"
4	Denis Menchov (RUS)	Rabobank	+ 3' 53"
5	Jurgen Van den Broeck (BEL)	Omega Pharma–Lotto	+ 5' 27"
6	Robert Gesink (NED)	Rabobank	+ 6' 41"
7	Joaquim Rodríguez (ESP)	Team Katusha	+ 7' 03"
8	Ryder Hesjedal (CAN)	Garmin–Transitions	+ 9' 18"
9	Roman Kreuziger (CZE)	Liquigas–Doimo	+ 10' 12"
10	Chris Horner (USA)	Team RadioShack	+ 10' 37"

== Stage 19 ==
24 July 2010 — Bordeaux to Pauillac, 52 km (32 mi) (individual time trial)

The race returns to its tradition of having a time trial on its penultimate day. The course is long, straight, and flat. Race officials expect the average time to complete the course will be 64 minutes. Fabian Cancellara took his second victory of the tour, whilst Tony Martin finished second. The battle between Alberto Contador and Andy Schleck for the yellow jersey also reached its climax. With Contador being the more accomplished Time-Trialist, he was expected to increase his lead. However, at the first time check, Schleck had taken time out of him and the lead was down to two seconds. However, from there on in, Contador began to open a gap, and ended picking time up 31 seconds on Schleck, meaning his Yellow Jersey was now safe.

Stage 19 result

Rank	Rider	Team	Time
1	Fabian Cancellara (SUI)	Team Saxo Bank	1h 00' 56"
2	Tony Martin (GER)	Team HTC–Columbia	+ 17"
3	Bert Grabsch (GER)	Team HTC–Columbia	+ 1' 48"
4	Ignatas Konovalovas (LTU)	Cervélo TestTeam	+ 2' 34"
5	David Zabriskie (USA)	Garmin–Transitions	+ 3' 00"
6	Koos Moerenhout (NED)	Rabobank	+ 3' 03"
7	Vasil Kiryienka (BLR)	Caisse d'Epargne	+ 3' 10"
8	Maarten Tjallingii (NED)	Rabobank	+ 3' 21"
9	Bradley Wiggins (GBR)	Team Sky	+ 3' 33"
10	Geraint Thomas (GBR)	Team Sky	+ 3' 38"

General classification after stage 19

Rank	Rider	Team	Time
1	~~Alberto Contador (ESP)~~	~~Astana~~	~~89h 16' 27"~~
2	Andy Schleck (LUX)	Team Saxo Bank	+ 39"
3	Denis Menchov (RUS)	Rabobank	+ 2' 01"
4	Samuel Sánchez (ESP)	Euskaltel–Euskadi	+ 3' 40"
5	Jurgen Van den Broeck (BEL)	Omega Pharma–Lotto	+ 6' 54"
6	Robert Gesink (NED)	Rabobank	+ 9' 31"
7	Ryder Hesjedal (CAN)	Garmin–Transitions	+ 10' 15"
8	Joaquim Rodríguez (ESP)	Team Katusha	+ 11' 37"
9	Roman Kreuziger (CZE)	Liquigas–Doimo	+ 11' 54"
10	Chris Horner (USA)	Team RadioShack	+ 12' 02"

== Stage 20 ==
25 July 2010 — Longjumeau to Paris, 102.5 km (63.7 mi)

The Tour concluded with its traditional, largely ceremonial finale on the Champs-Élysées. The riders take eight laps of the famous avenue before the final podium presentations. Mark Cavendish sprinted clear in the final 300 yards, with Alessandro Petacchi riding into second and Julian Dean third

Stage 20 result

Rank	Rider	Team	Time
1	Mark Cavendish (GBR)	Team HTC–Columbia	2h 42' 21"
2	Alessandro Petacchi (ITA)	Lampre–Farnese	s.t.
3	Julian Dean (NZL)	Garmin–Transitions	s.t.
4	Jürgen Roelandts (BEL)	Omega Pharma–Lotto	s.t.
5	Óscar Freire (ESP)	Rabobank	s.t.
6	Gerald Ciolek (GER)	Team Milram	s.t.
7	Thor Hushovd (NOR)	Cervélo TestTeam	s.t.
8	Matti Breschel (DEN)	Team Saxo Bank	s.t.
9	Robbie McEwen (AUS)	Team Katusha	s.t.
10	Daniel Oss (ITA)	Liquigas–Doimo	s.t.

Final General Classification

Rank	Rider	Team	Time
DSQ	~~Alberto Contador (ESP)~~	~~Astana~~	~~91h 58' 48"~~
1	Andy Schleck (LUX)	Team Saxo Bank	+ 39"
2	Denis Menchov (RUS)	Rabobank	+ 2' 01"
3	Samuel Sánchez (ESP)	Euskaltel–Euskadi	+ 3' 40"
4	Jurgen Van den Broeck (BEL)	Omega Pharma–Lotto	+ 6' 54"
5	Robert Gesink (NED)	Rabobank	+ 9' 31"
6	Ryder Hesjedal (CAN)	Garmin–Transitions	+ 10' 15"
7	Joaquim Rodríguez (ESP)	Team Katusha	+ 11' 37"
8	Roman Kreuziger (CZE)	Liquigas–Doimo	+ 11' 54"
9	Chris Horner (USA)	Team RadioShack	+ 12' 02"
