= Mathieu Perget =

French cyclist

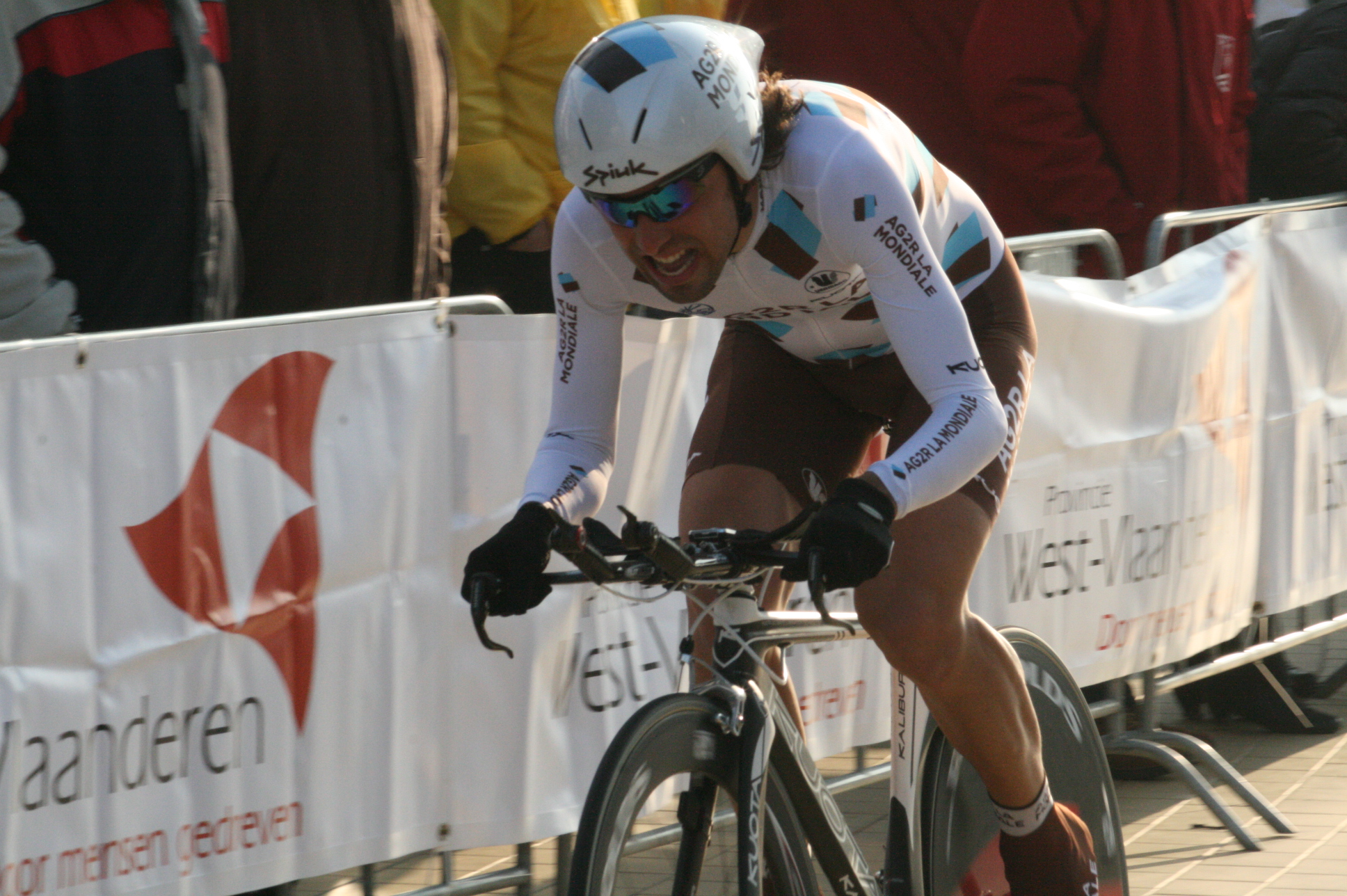

Personal information
- Full name: Mathieu Perget
- Born: September 18, 1984 (age 42) Montauban, France
- Height: 1.76 m (5 ft 9 in)
- Weight: 62 kg (137 lb)

Cycling career
- Sport: Cycling
- Current team: Retired
- Discipline: Road
- Role: Rider

Amateur teams
- 1998–1999: US Montauban Cyclisme 82
- 2000: CA Castelsarrasin
- 2001–2004: GSC Blagnac
- 2005: VC Roubaix
- 2013–2014: US Montauban Cyclisme 82
- 2013: CMI-Greenover

Professional teams
- 2006–2010: Caisse d'Epargne–Illes Balears
- 2011–2012: Ag2r–La Mondiale
- 2013: Rietumu–Delfin
- 2015: Pishgaman–Giant

Mathieu Perget (French: [matjø pɛʁʒe]; born 18 September 1984 in Montauban) is a French former professional road bicycle racer. Perget previously competed as a professional between 2006 and 2012 for UCI ProTour teams Caisse d'Epargne–Illes Balears and Ag2r–La Mondiale. His last win of his career was the 10 day Tour du Maroc in 2013.

Since retiring he has served as sports director for French amateur team AVX Aix, and in 2022 he joined continental team EuroCyclingTrips Pro Cycling as assistant sports director.

== Major results ==
2005
1st Road race, Mediterranean Games
2nd Overall Tour de Gironde

1st Stage 3

3rd World Under-19 Time Trial Championships
3rd Overall Circuit des Ardennes
8th Overall Ronde de l'Isard

1st Stage 4

10th Overall Critérium des Espoirs
2007
91st Overall Giro d'Italia
2008
112th Overall Giro d'Italia
2009
1st Overall Tour du Limousin
1st Stage 2 (TTT) Tour Méditerranéen
7th Overall Tour de l'Ain
9th Overall Route du Sud
72nd Overall Giro d'Italia
2010
63rd Overall Tour de France

Combativity award (Stage 6)

2011
24th Overall Vuelta a España
2012
4th Overall Tour du Limousin
5th Overall Route du Sud
2013
1st Overall Tour du Maroc

1st Stage 2
1st Mountains classification

1st Prologue (TTT) Tour de Guadeloupe
Challenge du Prince

2nd Trophée de la Maison Royale
4th Trophée de l'Anniversaire
7th Trophée Princier
