= 2010 Tour de France =

2010 UCI World Ranking, race 17 of 26
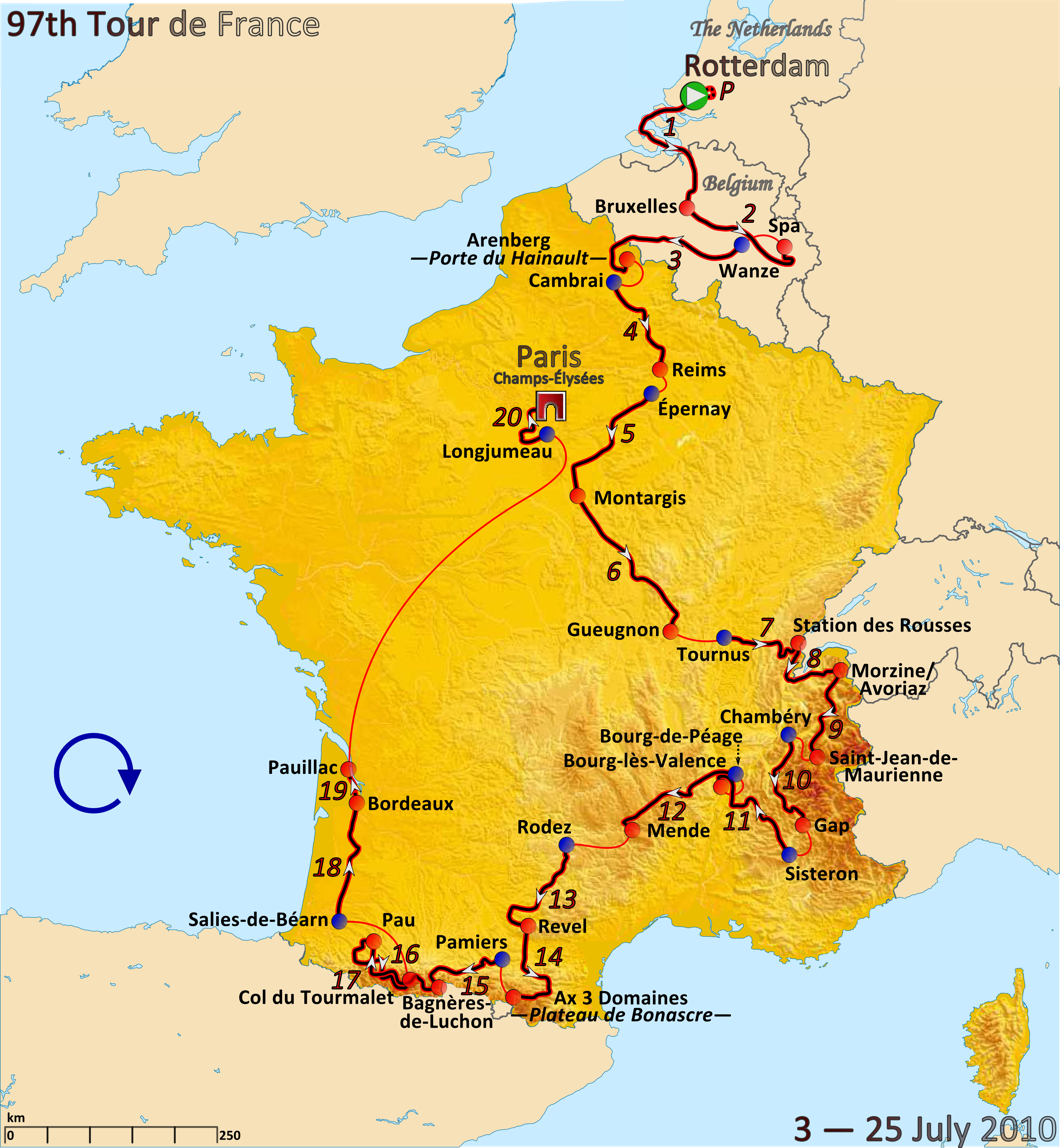
- Route of the 2010 Tour de France

Race details
- Dates: 3–25 July 2010
- Stages: 20 + Prologue
- Distance: 3,642 km (2,263 mi)
- Winning time: 91h 59' 27"

Results
Jersey awarded to the overall winner	Winner	~~Alberto Contador~~ Andy Schleck (LUX)	(Team Saxo Bank)
	Second	~~Denis Menchov~~ Samuel Sánchez (ESP)	(Euskaltel–Euskadi)
	Third	Jurgen Van den Broeck (BEL)	(Omega Pharma–Lotto)
Jersey awarded to the points classification winner	Points	Alessandro Petacchi (ITA)	(Lampre–Farnese)
Jersey awarded to the mountains classification winner	Mountains	Anthony Charteau (FRA)	(Bbox Bouygues Telecom)
Jersey awarded to the youth classification winner	Youth	Andy Schleck (LUX)	(Team Saxo Bank)
Jersey awarded to the combativity classification winner	Combativity	Sylvain Chavanel (FRA)	(Quick-Step)
Jersey awarded to the team classification winner	Team	Team RadioShack	

The 2010 Tour de France was the 97th edition of the Tour de France cycle race, one of cycling's Grand Tours. It started on 3 July with an 8.9 km prologue time trial in Rotterdam, the first start in the Netherlands since 1996. The race visited three countries: the Netherlands, Belgium and France, and finished on 25 July on the Champs-Élysées in Paris.

The total length was 3,642 kilometres (2,263 mi) including 60.9 kilometres (37.8 mi) in time-trials. Following an opening prologue time trial, the first three stages passed through the Netherlands and Belgium on routes designed to replicate some features of the spring classic cycle races. This included seven cobblestone sectors totaling 13.2 kilometres (8.2 mi), the longest distance of cobblestones in the Tour since 1983, on stage 3. There were six mountain stages, three of them with mountaintop finishes, and two medium mountain stages. In the 100th anniversary year of their first inclusion on the Tour, the emphasis was on the Pyrenees, with two ascents of the Col du Tourmalet.

The Tour was initially won by Alberto Contador, who was later revealed to have failed a doping test. After a series of events, the CAS finally decided in February 2012 that Contador would lose his results from 2010, declaring Andy Schleck the new winner. Schleck also won the young riders' competition for the third time running. France's Anthony Charteau won the polkadot jersey as the King of the Mountains whilst the Italian sprinter Alessandro Petacchi won the green jersey for victory in the points classification.

== Teams ==
Twenty-two teams with a total of nine riders accepted invitations to participate in the 2010 Tour de France. Sixteen of the teams were covered by a September 2008 agreement with the Union Cycliste Internationale, including two no longer part of the UCI ProTour. Six other teams, including the four ProTour teams not guaranteed a place, accepted their invitations.

The teams entering the race were:

Qualified teams

- Ag2r–La Mondiale
- Astana
- Bbox Bouygues Telecom †
- Caisse d'Epargne
- Cofidis †
- Euskaltel–Euskadi
- Footon–Servetto–Fuji
- FDJ
- Lampre–Farnese
- Liquigas–Doimo
- Omega Pharma–Lotto
- Quick-Step
- Rabobank
- Team HTC–Columbia
- Team Milram
- Team Saxo Bank

Invited teams

- BMC Racing Team †
- Cervélo TestTeam †
- Garmin–Transitions
- Team Katusha
- Team RadioShack
- Team Sky

†: Teams not part of the ProTour.

== Pre-race favourites ==
Before the start of the race, Contador was the overall race favourite. Among the other favourites were Andy Schleck, Cadel Evans, and Lance Armstrong. The US media, led by the US Tour broadcaster Versus, pitched the race as a showdown between Contador and Armstrong, both multi-tour champions going in. It has been since pointed out, however, that Armstrong's chances were perhaps exaggerated prior to the race; the two had already met that year in a two-day race in March at the Critérium International and Contador had finished four minutes ahead of Armstrong.

== Route and stages ==
The official Tour presentation was held on 14 October 2009. It was the third consecutive Grand Tour to begin in the Netherlands, as the 2009 Vuelta a España began in Assen, and the 2010 Giro d'Italia in Amsterdam. The race consisted of nine flat stages, six mountain stages (three summit finishes), four medium mountain stages, and two individual time trials, one of them being the opening prologue in Rotterdam. The highest point of elevation in the race was 2,115 m (6,939 ft) at the summit of the Col du Tourmalet mountain pass on stage 17.

Stage characteristics and winners
Stage	Date	Course	Distance	Type	Winner
P	3 July	Rotterdam (Netherlands)	8.9 km (6 mi)	Individual time trial	Fabian Cancellara (SUI)
1	4 July	Rotterdam to Brussels (Belgium)	223.5 km (139 mi)	Flat stage	Alessandro Petacchi (ITA)
2	5 July	Brussels to Spa (Belgium)	201 km (125 mi)	Flat stage	Sylvain Chavanel (FRA)
3	6 July	Wanze (Belgium) to Arenberg Porte du Hainaut	213 km (132 mi)	Flat cobblestone stage	Thor Hushovd (NOR)
4	7 July	Cambrai to Reims	153.5 km (95 mi)	Flat stage	Alessandro Petacchi (ITA)
5	8 July	Épernay to Montargis	187.5 km (117 mi)	Flat stage	Mark Cavendish (GBR)
6	9 July	Montargis to Gueugnon	227.5 km (141 mi)	Flat stage	Mark Cavendish (GBR)
7	10 July	Tournus to Station des Rousses	165.5 km (103 mi)	Medium mountain stage	Sylvain Chavanel (FRA)
8	11 July	Station des Rousses to Morzine-Avoriaz	189 km (117 mi)	Mountain stage	Andy Schleck (LUX)
	12 July	Morzine-Avoriaz		Rest day	
9	13 July	Morzine-Avoriaz to Saint-Jean-de-Maurienne	204.5 km (127 mi)	Mountain stage	Sandy Casar (FRA)
10	14 July	Chambéry to Gap	179 km (111 mi)	Medium mountain stage	Sérgio Paulinho (POR)
11	15 July	Sisteron to Bourg-lès-Valence	184.5 km (115 mi)	Flat stage	Mark Cavendish (GBR)
12	16 July	Bourg-de-Péage to Mende	210.5 km (131 mi)	Medium mountain stage	Joaquim Rodríguez (ESP)
13	17 July	Rodez to Revel	196 km (122 mi)	Flat stage	Alexander Vinokourov (KAZ)
14	18 July	Revel to Ax 3 Domaines	184.5 km (115 mi)	Mountain stage	Christophe Riblon (FRA)
15	19 July	Pamiers to Bagnères-de-Luchon	187.5 km (117 mi)	Mountain stage	Thomas Voeckler (FRA)
16	20 July	Bagnères-de-Luchon to Pau	199.5 km (124 mi)	Mountain stage	Pierrick Fédrigo (FRA)
	21 July	Pau		Rest day	
17	22 July	Pau to Col du Tourmalet	174 km (108 mi)	Mountain stage	Andy Schleck (LUX)
18	23 July	Salies-de-Béarn to Bordeaux	198 km (123 mi)	Flat stage	Mark Cavendish (GBR)
19	24 July	Bordeaux to Pauillac	52 km (32 mi)	Individual time trial	Fabian Cancellara (SUI)
20	25 July	Longjumeau to Paris (Champs-Élysées)	102.5 km (64 mi)	Flat stage	Mark Cavendish (GBR)
	Total		3,642 km (2,263 mi)		

== Race overview ==
The race started in Rotterdam with a 9 km prologue won by Fabian Cancellara. Sylvain Chavanel claimed the lead from Cancellara on Stage 2, after a massive crash which involved many riders, most notably Andy Schleck, a contender for overall victory, and Alessandro Petacchi. The riders in the peloton chose to wait for the fallen riders. However, on the cobbles of Stage 3, Cancellara retook the overall lead as Chavanel struggled. Fränk Schleck had to retire from the race, having sustained a collarbone fracture on a crash which delayed many of the riders in the peloton, including Contador and Armstrong who were hopeful of finishing high in the general classification. A number of their rivals, including Andy Schleck, Cadel Evans and Ryder Hesjedal, were ahead of the crash and so were able to gain a time advantage. Green jersey contender Thor Hushovd won the stage and took the lead in the Points classification as Geraint Thomas, who was riding in his second Tour, finished 2nd and took the white jersey from Tony Martin, who had been wearing it since the Prologue.

On Stage 7 Chavanel again raced away from the field to take his second stage win and maillot jaune of the 2010 edition of the race, whilst Andy Schleck took the young riders' classification lead from Thomas. Evans took the yellow jersey from Chavanel the following day on Stage 8, and in turn lost the lead to Schleck on Stage 9 following a rest day.

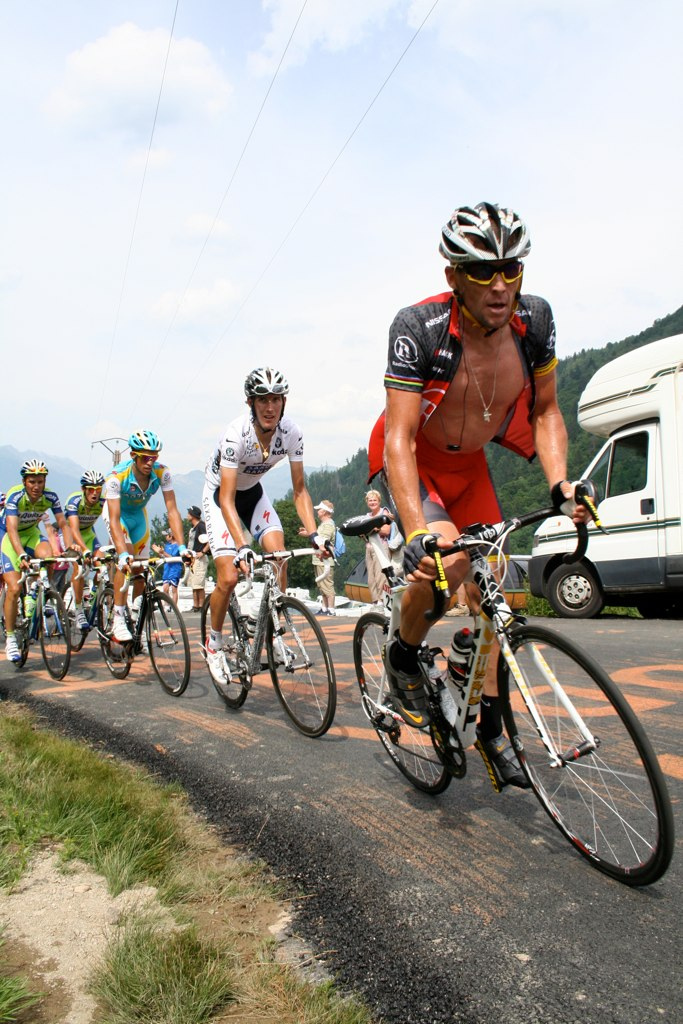
Lance Armstrong followed by other favourites on stage 9

In Stage 11, Petacchi took the green jersey from Hushovd; Mark Cavendish won the stage, but his leadout rider, Mark Renshaw, was disqualified from the Tour after headbutting Julian Dean while leading out his teammate.

On Stage 15 Schleck was race leader and pressing the pace over the day's final climb of Port de Bales when he threw his chain. Contador and Denis Menchov immediately moved to the front and attacked, pressing the advantage over the crest of the climb and all the way back down into Bagneres-de-Luchon. They were aided by Sammy Sanchez and two others making a group of five riders, all looking to gain time. Schleck chased hard, but had no other riders to help bridge the gap. By stage's end, he had lost the yellow jersey and 39 seconds to Contador. Contador, who now had an eight-second lead in the race, met with a mixed reception as he received the yellow jersey on the podium at the end of the stage.

Contador said that he did not know that Schleck had technical trouble, and that he had already launched an attack by then, but review of the race shows that he was chasing an attack by Schleck, that he nearly struck Schleck as he moved past him, and that he looked back repeatedly on the climb while Schleck struggled to close down the gap. Hours later, he apologised for the incident. Although he was criticised by Sean Kelly and a number of riders both past and current, he also found support from the likes of Bernard Hinault, Miguel Induráin, Eddy Merckx and Laurent Jalabert. Cervélo team owner Gerard Vroomen commented: "Contador just gained a great chance to win, but he lost the chance to win greatly." This same stage saw Anthony Charteau take the lead in the King of the Mountains competition from fellow Frenchman Jérôme Pineau.

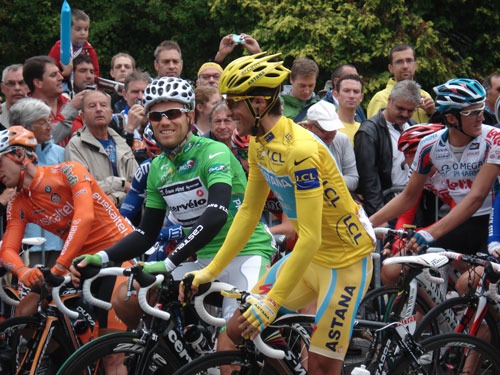
Alberto Contador in the start of the stage 17 in Pau

The 17th stage was considered this Tour's queen stage. The first-category Col de Marie-Blanque and Col du Soulor climbs preceded a grueling summit finish atop of the Hors Catégorie Col de Tourmalet, the second ascent of the Tourmalet of this year's Tour. The stage turned into a battle between Andy Schleck and Alberto Contador. The tour's top two riders separated themselves from the field on the final climb. Schleck launched numerous attacks upon Contador in the final 15 kilometres, but was unable to separate from him. Contador coolly stayed on Schleck's wheel, and attacked as well once, but was pulled back by Schleck. Schleck went on to take the stage over Contador, who seemed happy to follow Schleck across the line while holding a seemingly unassailable lead in the GC. Meanwhile, Anthony Charteau confirmed his hold on the Polka-dot Jersey, as the Tour completed its final categorised climbs.

On stage 18 Petacchi took the green jersey from Hushovd for the final time. The points classification was hotly contested between these two riders and the jersey changed hands a half dozen times between them throughout the race.

Stage 19 was the final time trial. It was widely expected that Contador would increase his lead over Schleck, who in the past had struggled in this discipline, but the initial going surprised all as Schleck set a high pace that Contador had difficulty matching. By the first time check Schleck had picked up six seconds, cutting Contador's overall lead to just two seconds on the road. By the second time check Contador had recovered his losses and extended his lead over Schleck by six seconds. Over the final third of the course Contador extended his advantage, gaining an additional twenty-five seconds on his rival for an overall gain of thirty-one seconds for the stage. Fabian Cancellara, the Olympic and World Time Trial Champion, won the stage by seventeen seconds over runner-up Tony Martin. In addition Denis Menchov was able to overtake Samuel Sánchez for third place overall, while Ryder Hesjedal was able to move in front of Joaquim Rodríguez for the seventh place slot in the GC. Contador's first-place lead increased to 39 seconds, essentially guaranteeing him the victory.

The final stage was won by Cavendish, who became the first winner of consecutive Champs-Élysées stages. The Manx sprinter won five stages, more than any other rider in 2010 Tour, taking his career tally to 15 stage wins. Original tour winner Alberto Contador finished surrounded by his Astana teammates. This was his third Tour de France in three consecutive entries, after having won it in 2007 and 2009. Schleck finished in second place for the second year in a row (later to receive the victory after Contador's positive test and subsequent ban) and Menchov completed the podium in third place. Petacchi won the Green jersey. His second-place finish in the final stage gave him enough points to finish just above Cavendish and Hushovd. France's Charteau won the Polka dot jersey.

=== Doping ===
In September 2010, Contador revealed that a urine sample he had given on 21 July, a rest day in the 2010 Tour de France, had contained traces of clenbuterol. He has stated, due to the number of other tests he passed and that only a tiny amount of the substance was detected in the one he failed, that food contamination was to blame. The UCI issued a statement reporting that the concentration was 50 picograms per millilitre, and that this was 1/40 the minimum standards of detection capability required by WADA, and that further scientific investigation would be required. In late January 2011, the Spanish Cycling Federation proposed a one-year ban, but it subsequently accepted Contador's appeal and cleared him of all charges. The UCI and the World Anti-Doping Agency each referred the decision independently to the Court of Arbitration for Sport in March 2011, but Contador remained free to ride until their ruling was made. The hearing was delayed until after the 2011 Tour de France at Contador's request and then deferred to November 2011. On 6 February 2012, the CAS stripped Contador of the 2010 title, making Andy Schleck the winner.

Armstrong was stripped of all his professional results from August 1998 to August 2012, including his seven Tour titles on 22 October 2012. Armstrong's finish in the 2010 Tour—originally 23rd; 22nd at the time of its stripping—was also stripped. In January 2013, Armstrong admitted to doping in an interview with Oprah Winfrey. Although he admitted to have doped in his seven wins, he denied doping in the 2009 and 2010 Tours. Regardless, Armstrong was stripped of his finishes in those two Tours as well, because his blood values indicated that he doped. USADA's report stated that "The likelihood of Armstrong's blood values from the 2009 and 2010 Tours de France occurring naturally is less than one in a million".

On 10 July 2014, a UCI press release detailing various athlete sanctions specified that Menchov had been banned (for a period of two years) until 9 April 2015 due to adverse biological passport findings. Due to this, he has been disqualified from the 2009, 2010 and 2012 Tours de France.

In May 2011, newspaper l'Equipe published a list of cyclists and an index that indicated the suspicion for doping use.

== Classification leadership and minor prizes ==
There were four main individual classifications contested in the 2010 Tour de France, as well as a team competition. The most important was the general classification, which was calculated by adding each rider's finishing times on each stage. There were no time bonuses given at the end of stages for this edition of the Tour. If a crash had happened within the final 3 km (1.9 mi) of a stage, not including time trials and summit finishes, the riders involved would have received the same time as the group they were in when the crash occurred. The rider with the lowest cumulative time was the winner of the general classification and was considered the overall winner of the Tour. The rider leading the classification wore a yellow jersey.

The second classification was the points classification. Riders received points for finishing in the highest positions in a stage finish, or in intermediate sprints during the stage. The points available for each stage finish were determined by the stage's type. The leader was identified by a green jersey.

The third classification was the mountains classification. Most stages of the race included one or more categorised climbs, in which points were awarded to the riders that reached the summit first. The climbs were categorised as fourth-, third-, second- or first-category and hors catégorie, with the more difficult climbs rated lower. The leader wore a white jersey with red polka dots.

The final individual classification was the young rider classification. This was calculated the same way as the general classification, but the classification was restricted to riders who were born on or after 1 January 1985. The leader wore a white jersey.

The final classification was a team classification. This was calculated using the finishing times of the best three riders per team on each stage; the leading team was the team with the lowest cumulative time. The number of stage victories and placings per team determined the outcome of a tie. The riders in the team that lead this classification were identified with yellow number bibs on the back of their jerseys.

In addition, there was a combativity award given after each stage to the rider considered, by a jury, to have "made the greatest effort and who has demonstrated the best qualities of sportsmanship". No combativity awards were given for the time trials and the final stage. The winner wore a red number bib the following stage. At the conclusion of the Tour, Sylvain Chavanel was given the overall super-combativity award.

There were also two special awards each with a prize of €5000, the Souvenir Henri Desgrange, given in honour of Tour founder and first race director Henri Desgrange, and the Souvenir Jacques Goddet, given in honour of the second director Jacques Goddet, both to the first rider to pass the summit of the Col du Tourmalet on stages 17 and 16 respectively. Andy Schleck won the Henri Desgrange and Christophe Moreau won the Jacques Goddet.

Classification leadership by stage
Stage	Winner	General classification	Points classification	Mountains classification	Young rider classification	Team classification	Combativity award
P	Fabian Cancellara	Fabian Cancellara	Fabian Cancellara	no award	Tony Martin	Team RadioShack	no award
1	Alessandro Petacchi	Fabian Cancellara	Alessandro Petacchi	no award	Tony Martin	Team RadioShack	Maarten Wynants
2	Sylvain Chavanel	Sylvain Chavanel	Sylvain Chavanel	Jérôme Pineau	Tony Martin	Quick-Step	Sylvain Chavanel
3	Thor Hushovd	Fabian Cancellara	Thor Hushovd	Jérôme Pineau	Geraint Thomas	Team Saxo Bank	Ryder Hesjedal
4	Alessandro Petacchi	Fabian Cancellara	Thor Hushovd	Jérôme Pineau	Geraint Thomas	Team Saxo Bank	Dimitri Champion
5	Mark Cavendish	Fabian Cancellara	Thor Hushovd	Jérôme Pineau	Geraint Thomas	Team Saxo Bank	Iván Gutiérrez
6	Mark Cavendish	Fabian Cancellara	Thor Hushovd	Jérôme Pineau	Geraint Thomas	Team Saxo Bank	Mathieu Perget
7	Sylvain Chavanel	Sylvain Chavanel	Thor Hushovd	Jérôme Pineau	Andy Schleck	Astana	Jérôme Pineau
8	Andy Schleck	Cadel Evans	Thor Hushovd	Jérôme Pineau	Andy Schleck	Rabobank	Mario Aerts
9	Sandy Casar	Andy Schleck	Thor Hushovd	Anthony Charteau	Andy Schleck	Caisse d'Epargne	Luis León Sánchez
10	Sérgio Paulinho	Andy Schleck	Thor Hushovd	Jérôme Pineau	Andy Schleck	Caisse d'Epargne	Mario Aerts
11	Mark Cavendish	Andy Schleck	Alessandro Petacchi	Jérôme Pineau	Andy Schleck	Caisse d'Epargne	Stéphane Augé
12	Joaquim Rodríguez	Andy Schleck	Thor Hushovd	Anthony Charteau	Andy Schleck	Team RadioShack	Alexander Vinokourov
13	Alexander Vinokourov	Andy Schleck	Alessandro Petacchi	Anthony Charteau	Andy Schleck	Team RadioShack	Juan Antonio Flecha
14	Christophe Riblon	Andy Schleck	Alessandro Petacchi	Anthony Charteau	Andy Schleck	Caisse d'Epargne	Christophe Riblon
15	Thomas Voeckler	Alberto Contador^{*}	Alessandro Petacchi	Anthony Charteau	Andy Schleck	Team RadioShack	Thomas Voeckler
16	Pierrick Fédrigo	Alberto Contador^{*}	Thor Hushovd	Anthony Charteau	Andy Schleck	Team RadioShack	Carlos Barredo
17	Andy Schleck	Alberto Contador^{*}	Thor Hushovd	Anthony Charteau	Andy Schleck	Team RadioShack	Alexandr Kolobnev
18	Mark Cavendish	Alberto Contador^{*}	Alessandro Petacchi	Anthony Charteau	Andy Schleck	Team RadioShack	Daniel Oss
19	Fabian Cancellara	Alberto Contador^{*}	Alessandro Petacchi	Anthony Charteau	Andy Schleck	Team RadioShack	no award
20	Mark Cavendish	Alberto Contador^{*}	Alessandro Petacchi	Anthony Charteau	Andy Schleck	Team RadioShack	no award
Final		~~Alberto Contador~~ Andy Schleck^{*}	Alessandro Petacchi	Anthony Charteau	Andy Schleck	Team RadioShack	Sylvain Chavanel

- In stage 1, David Millar, who was third in the points classification, wore the green jersey, as Fabian Cancellara held the general classification as well as the points classification, and Tony Martin, who was second in the points classification, was wearing the white jersey.
- In stage 3, Alessandro Petacchi wore the green jersey, as Sylvain Chavanel held the general classification as well as the points classification.
- In stages 10 through 15, Robert Gesink wore the white jersey, as Andy Schleck held the general classification as well as the youth competition.
- Alberto Contador wore the yellow jersey from the end of the 15th stage on, but his victory was later stripped due to his positive test. Andy Schleck was second in the general classification during these stages.

== Final standings ==
Legend
A yellow jersey.	Denotes the winner of the general classification	A green jersey.	Denotes the winner of the points classification
A white jersey with red polka dots.	Denotes the winner of the mountains classification	A white jersey.	Denotes the winner of the young rider classification
A white jersey with a yellow number bib.	Denotes the winner of the team classification	A white jersey with a red number bib.	Denotes the winner of the super-combativity award

=== General classification ===
Final general classification (1–10)
Rank	Rider	Team	Time
DSQ	~~Alberto Contador (ESP)~~	~~Team Astana~~	~~91h 58' 48"~~
1	Andy Schleck (LUX)	Team Saxo Bank	91h 59' 27"
DSQ	~~Denis Menchov (RUS)~~	~~Rabobank~~	~~+1' 22"~~
2	Samuel Sánchez (ESP)	Euskaltel–Euskadi	+ 3' 01"
3	Jurgen Van den Broeck (BEL)	Omega Pharma–Lotto	+ 6' 15"
4	Robert Gesink (NED)	Rabobank	+ 8' 52"
5	Ryder Hesjedal (CAN)	Garmin–Transitions	+ 9' 36"
6	Joaquim Rodríguez (ESP)	Team Katusha	+ 10' 58"
7	Roman Kreuziger (CZE)	Liquigas–Doimo	+ 11' 15"
8	Chris Horner (USA)	Team RadioShack	+ 11' 23"
9	Luis Leon Sánchez (ESP)	Caisse d'Epargne	+ 13' 42"
10	Rubén Plaza (ESP)	Caisse d'Epargne	+ 13' 50"

Final general classification (11–170)
Rank	Rider	Team	Time
11	Levi Leipheimer (USA)	Team RadioShack	+ 14' 01"
12	Andreas Klöden (GER)	Team RadioShack	+ 15' 57"
13	Nicolas Roche (IRE)	Ag2r–La Mondiale	+ 16' 20"
14	Alexander Vinokourov (KAZ)	Astana	+ 17' 07"
15	Thomas Lövkvist (SWE)	Team Sky	+ 20' 07"
16	Kevin De Weert (BEL)	Quick-Step	+ 21' 15"
17	John Gadret (FRA)	Ag2r–La Mondiale	+ 23' 25"
18	Carlos Sastre (ESP)	Cervélo TestTeam	+ 25' 58"
19	Daniel Moreno (ESP)	Omega Pharma–Lotto	+ 28' 59"
20	Christophe Moreau (FRA)	Caisse d'Epargne	+ 33' 22"
DSQ	~~Lance Armstrong (USA)~~	~~Team RadioShack~~	~~+38' 41"~~
21	Bradley Wiggins (GBR)	Team Sky	+ 38' 45"
22	Sandy Casar (FRA)	FDJ	+ 45' 13"
23	Cadel Evans (AUS)	BMC Racing Team	+ 49' 48"
24	Julien El Fares (FRA)	Cofidis	+ 52' 43"
25	Christophe Riblon (FRA)	Ag2r–La Mondiale	+ 54' 34"
26	Damiano Cunego (ITA)	Lampre–Farnese	+ 56' 14"
27	Johan Vansummeren (BEL)	Garmin–Transitions	+ 58' 14"
28	Sylvain Chavanel (FRA)	Quick-Step	+ 58' 38"
29	Ivan Basso (ITA)	Liquigas–Doimo	+ 58' 54"
30	Mario Aerts (BEL)	Omega Pharma–Lotto	+ 1h 01' 57"
31	Volodymir Gustov (UKR)	Cervélo TestTeam	+ 1h 09' 12"
32	Juan Manuel Gárate (ESP)	Rabobank	+ 1h 09' 24"
33	Gorka Verdugo (ESP)	Euskaltel–Euskadi	+ 1h 09' 30"
34	Michael Rogers (AUS)	Team HTC–Columbia	+ 1h 09' 32"
35	Rémi Pauriol (FRA)	Cofidis	+ 1h 10' 13"
36	Kanstantsin Sivtsov (BLR)	Team HTC–Columbia	+ 1h 12' 40"
37	Egoi Martínez (ESP)	Euskaltel–Euskadi	+ 1h 18' 30"
DSQ	~~Carlos Barredo (ESP)~~	~~Quick-Step~~	~~+ 1h 19' 32"~~
38	Christophe Le Mével (FRA)	FDJ	+ 1h 21' 59"
39	Janez Brajkovič (SLO)	Team RadioShack	+ 1h 22' 47"
40	Anthony Charteau (FRA)	Bbox Bouygues Telecom	+ 1h 23' 33"
41	Cyril Gautier (FRA)	Bbox Bouygues Telecom	+ 1h 24' 33"
42	Sergio Paulinho (POR)	Team RadioShack	+ 1h 25' 04"
43	Matthew Lloyd (AUS)	Omega Pharma–Lotto	+ 1h 29' 23"
44	José Iván Gutiérrez (ESP)	Caisse d'Epargne	+ 1h 37' 47"
45	Daniel Navarro (ESP)	Astana	+ 1h 37' 51"
46	Jakob Fuglsang (DEN)	Team Saxo Bank	+ 1h 37' 53"
47	Steve Morabito (SUI)	BMC Racing Team	+ 1h 38' 32"
48	Koos Moerenhout (NED)	Rabobank	+ 1h 40' 06"
49	Rafael Valls (ESP)	Footon–Servetto–Fuji	+ 1h 41' 48"
50	Paolo Tiralongo (ITA)	Astana	+ 1h 44' 22"
51	Maxime Monfort (BEL)	Team HTC–Columbia	+ 1h 44' 23"
52	Grischa Niermann (GER)	Rabobank	+ 1h 45' 53"
53	Pierrick Fédrigo (FRA)	Bbox Bouygues Telecom	+ 1h 45' 58"
54	Pierre Rolland (FRA)	Bbox Bouygues Telecom	+ 1h 46' 03"
55	George Hincapie (USA)	BMC Racing Team	+ 1h 46' 11"
56	Vasil Kiryienka (BLR)	Caisse d'Epargne	+ 1h 47' 15"
57	Sylwester Szmyd (POL)	Liquigas–Doimo	+ 1h 47' 23"
58	Iván Velasco (ESP)	Euskaltel–Euskadi	+ 1h 49' 18"
59	Jurgen Van De Walle (BEL)	Quick-Step	+ 1h 50' 54"
60	Mathieu Perget (FRA)	Caisse d'Epargne	+ 1h 53' 00"
61	Alexandr Kolobnev (RUS)	Team Katusha	+ 1h 54' 34"
62	Jérôme Pineau (FRA)	Quick-Step	+ 1h 57' 19"
63	Geraint Thomas (GBR)	Team Sky	+ 1h 59' 26"
64	José Joaquín Rojas (ESP)	Caisse d'Epargne	+ 2h 01' 19"
65	Chris Anker Sørensen (DEN)	Team Saxo Bank	+ 2h 04' 07"
66	Amaël Moinard (FRA)	Cofidis	+ 2h 04' 31"
67	Damien Monier (FRA)	Cofidis	+ 2h 08' 54"
68	Francis De Greef (BEL)	Omega Pharma–Lotto	+ 2h 11' 43"
69	Rui Costa (POR)	Caisse d'Epargne	+ 2h 11' 49"
70	Thomas Rohregger (AUT)	Team Milram	+ 2h 12' 18"
71	Martin Elmiger (SUI)	Ag2r–La Mondiale	+ 2h 14' 54"
72	Thomas Voeckler (FRA)	Bbox Bouygues Telecom	+ 2h 15' 28"
73	Imanol Erviti (ESP)	Caisse d'Epargne	+ 2h 18' 36"
74	Rémy Di Gregorio (FRA)	FDJ	+ 2h 20' 55"
75	Eduard Vorganov (RUS)	Team Katusha	+ 2h 26' 40"
76	Sebastian Lang (GER)	Omega Pharma–Lotto	+ 2h 28' 59"
77	Arkaitz Duran (ESP)	Footon–Servetto–Fuji	+ 2h 29' 10"
78	Aitor Pérez (ESP)	Footon–Servetto–Fuji	+ 2h 31' 38"
79	Eros Capecchi (ITA)	Footon–Servetto–Fuji	+ 2h 33' 59"
80	Linus Gerdemann (GER)	Team Milram	+ 2h 35' 36"
81	Yaroslav Popovych (UKR)	Team RadioShack	+ 2h 37' 17"
82	Aleksandr Kuschynski (BLR)	Liquigas–Doimo	+ 2h 39' 01"
83	Alessandro Ballan (ITA)	BMC Racing Team	+ 2h 41' 59"
84	Nicolas Vogondy (FRA)	Bbox Bouygues Telecom	+ 2h 42' 03"
85	Juan Antonio Flecha (ESP)	Team Sky	+ 2h 43' 01"
86	Johannes Fröhlinger (GER)	Team Milram	+ 2h 48' 44"
87	Christian Knees (GER)	Team Milram	+ 2h 52' 59"
88	Sébastien Minard (FRA)	Cofidis	+ 2h 53' 51"
89	Mathieu Ladagnous (FRA)	FDJ	+ 2h 54' 57"
90	Kristjan Koren (SLO)	Liquigas–Doimo	+ 2h 56' 32"
91	Rubén Pérez (ESP)	Euskaltel–Euskadi	+ 2h 56' 38"
92	Benoît Vaugrenard (FRA)	FDJ	+ 2h 57' 26"
93	Christophe Kern (GER)	Cofidis	+ 2h 57' 55"
94	Rinaldo Nocentini (ITA)	Ag2r–La Mondiale	+ 3h 00' 30"
95	Michael Barry (CAN)	Team Sky	+ 3h 00' 55"
96	Matthieu Sprick (FRA)	Bbox Bouygues Telecom	+ 3h 01' 01"
97	David Zabriskie (USA)	Garmin–Transitions	+ 3h 01' 09"
98	Pavel Brutt (RUS)	Team Katusha	+ 3h 02' 33"
99	Luke Roberts (AUS)	Team Milram	+ 3h 03' 28"
100	Benjamín Noval (ESP)	Astana	+ 3h 04' 43"
101	Francesco Gavazzi (ITA)	Lampre–Farnese	+ 3h 06' 05"
102	Maxime Bouet (FRA)	Ag2r–La Mondiale	+ 3h 07' 01"
103	Serge Pauwels (BEL)	Team Sky	+ 3h 08' 09"
104	Alexandre Pliușchin (MDA)	Team Katusha	+ 3h 08' 26"
105	Sergei Ivanov (RUS)	Team Katusha	+ 3h 08' 31"
106	David de la Fuente (ESP)	Astana	+ 3h 10' 25"
107	Thor Hushovd (NOR)	Cervélo TestTeam	+ 3h 12' 18"
108	Yukiya Arashiro (JPN)	Bbox Bouygues Telecom	+ 3h 12' 41"
109	Sébastien Turgot (FRA)	Bbox Bouygues Telecom	+ 3h 13' 26"
110	Grégory Rast (SUI)	Team RadioShack	+ 3h 13' 32"
111	Iñaki Isasi (ESP)	Euskaltel–Euskadi	+ 3h 13' 51"
112	Edvald Boasson Hagen (NOR)	Team Sky	+ 3h 14' 18"
113	Maarten Wynants (BEL)	Quick-Step	+ 3h 14' 40"
114	Lloyd Mondory (FRA)	Ag2r–La Mondiale	+ 3h 15' 41"
115	Fabian Wegmann (GER)	Team Milram	+ 3h 17' 14"
116	Jürgen Roelandts (BEL)	Omega Pharma–Lotto	+ 3h 17' 48"
117	Fabian Cancellara (SUI)	Team Saxo Bank	+ 3h 19' 04"
118	Francesco Bellotti (ITA)	Liquigas–Doimo	+ 3h 19' 47"
119	Mauro Da Dalto (ITA)	Lampre–Farnese	+ 3h 21' 10"
120	Daniel Oss (ITA)	Liquigas–Doimo	+ 3h 21' 40"
121	Grega Bole (SLO)	Lampre–Farnese	+ 3h 22' 28"
122	Jens Voigt (GER)	Team Saxo Bank	+ 3h 22' 52"
123	Ignatas Konovalovas (LIT)	Cervélo TestTeam	+ 3h 22' 57"
124	Brian Bach Vandborg (DEN)	Liquigas–Doimo	+ 3h 23' 38"
125	Alan Pérez (ESP)	Euskaltel–Euskadi	+ 3h 24' 11"
126	Lars Boom (NED)	Rabobank	+ 3h 25' 39"
127	Maxim Iglinsky (KAZ)	Astana	+ 3h 25' 49"
128	Maarten Tjallingii (NED)	Rabobank	+ 3h 26' 51"
129	Gerald Ciolek (GER)	Team Milram	+ 3h 26' 57"
130	Kevin Seeldraeyers (BEL)	Quick-Step	+ 3h 28' 22"
131	Danilo Hondo (GER)	Lampre–Farnese	+ 3h 28' 33"
132	Andriy Hrivko (UKR)	Astana	+ 3h 29' 27"
133	Tony Martin (GER)	Team HTC–Columbia	+ 3h 30' 31"
134	Karsten Kroon (NED)	BMC Racing Team	+ 3h 30' 59"
135	Martijn Maaskant (NED)	Garmin–Transitions	+ 3h 31' 19"
136	Jesús Hernández (ESP)	Astana	+ 3h 31' 23"
137	Óscar Freire (ESP)	Rabobank	+ 3h 33' 06"
138	Matti Breschel (DEN)	Team Saxo Bank	+ 3h 34' 52"
139	Jérémy Roy (FRA)	FDJ	+ 3h 37' 18"
140	Dries Devenyns (BEL)	Quick-Step	+ 3h 37' 57"
141	José Alberto Benítez (ESP)	Footon–Servetto–Fuji	+ 3h 38' 33"
142	Anthony Geslin (FRA)	FDJ	+ 3h 38' 58"
143	Brent Bookwalter (USA)	BMC Racing Team	+ 3h 40' 58"
144	Dmitriy Muravyev (KAZ)	Team RadioShack	+ 3h 41' 08"
145	Stuart O'Grady (AUS)	Team Saxo Bank	+ 3h 42' 00"
146	Alessandro Petacchi (ITA)	Lampre–Farnese	+ 3h 43' 59"
147	Steven Cummings (GBR)	Team Sky	+ 3h 45' 08"
148	Wesley Sulzberger (AUS)	FDJ	+ 3h 46' 20"
149	Stéphane Augé (FRA)	Cofidis	+ 3h 49' 11"
150	Mark Cavendish (GBR)	Team HTC–Columbia	+ 3h 50' 44"
151	Nicki Sørensen (DEN)	Team Saxo Bank	+ 3h 53' 33"
152	Bernhard Eisel (AUT)	Team HTC–Columbia	+ 3h 53' 37"
153	Julian Dean (NZL)	Garmin–Transitions	+ 3h 55' 34"
154	David Millar (GBR)	Garmin–Transitions	+ 3h 56' 07"
155	Brett Lancaster (AUS)	Cervélo TestTeam	+ 3h 56' 21"
156	Dimitri Champion (FRA)	Ag2r–La Mondiale	+ 3h 59' 06"
157	Marcus Burghardt (GER)	BMC Racing Team	+ 4h 00' 08"
158	Manuel Quinziato (ITA)	Liquigas–Doimo	+ 4h 00' 23"
159	Jeremy Hunt (GBR)	Cervélo TestTeam	+ 4h 01' 42"
160	Daniel Lloyd (GBR)	Cervélo TestTeam	+ 4h 02' 20"
161	Robbie McEwen (AUS)	Team Katusha	+ 4h 07' 49"
162	Mirco Lorenzetto (ITA)	Lampre–Farnese	+ 4h 08' 33"
163	Anthony Roux (FRA)	FDJ	+ 4h 12' 58"
DSQ	~~Andreas Klier (GER)~~	~~Cervélo TestTeam~~	~~+4h 16' 37"~~
164	Bert Grabsch (GER)	Team HTC–Columbia	+ 4h 22' 22"
165	Adriano Malori (ITA)	Lampre–Farnese	+ 4h 26' 24"

=== Points classification ===
Final points classification (1–10)
Rank	Rider	Team	Points
1	Alessandro Petacchi (ITA)	Lampre–Farnese	243
2	Mark Cavendish (GBR)	Team HTC–Columbia	232
3	Thor Hushovd (NOR)	Cervélo TestTeam	222
4	José Joaquín Rojas (ESP)	Caisse d'Epargne	179
5	Robbie McEwen (AUS)	Team Katusha	179
6	Edvald Boasson Hagen (NOR)	Team Sky	161
7	Sébastien Turgot (FRA)	Bbox Bouygues Telecom	135
8	Gerald Ciolek (GER)	Team Milram	126
9	Jürgen Roelandts (BEL)	Omega Pharma–Lotto	124
10	Lloyd Mondory (FRA)	Ag2r–La Mondiale	119

=== Mountains classification ===
Final mountains classification (1–10)
Rank	Rider	Team	Points
1	Anthony Charteau (FRA)	Bbox Bouygues Telecom	143
2	Christophe Moreau (FRA)	Caisse d'Epargne	128
3	Andy Schleck (LUX)	Team Saxo Bank	116
DSQ	~~Alberto Contador (ESP)~~	Astana	112
4	Damiano Cunego (ITA)	Lampre–Farnese	99
5	Samuel Sánchez (ESP)	Euskaltel–Euskadi	96
6	Sandy Casar (FRA)	Française des Jeux	93
7	Jérôme Pineau (FRA)	Quick-Step	92
8	Thomas Voeckler (FRA)	Bbox Bouygues Telecom	82
9	Pierrick Fédrigo (FRA)	Bbox Bouygues Telecom	72
10	Joaquim Rodríguez (ESP)	Team Katusha	66

=== Young rider classification ===
Final young rider classification (1–10)
Rank	Rider	Team	Time
1	Andy Schleck (LUX)	Team Saxo Bank	91h 59′ 27"
2	Robert Gesink (NED)	Rabobank	+ 8′ 52"
3	Roman Kreuziger (CZE)	Liquigas–Doimo	+ 11′ 15"
4	Julien El Fares (FRA)	Cofidis	+ 52′ 43"
5	Cyril Gautier (FRA)	Bbox Bouygues Telecom	+ 1h 24′ 33"
6	Jakob Fuglsang (DEN)	Team Saxo Bank	+ 1h 37′ 53"
7	Rafael Valls (ESP)	Footon–Servetto–Fuji	+ 1h 41′ 48"
8	Pierre Rolland (FRA)	Bbox Bouygues Telecom	+ 1h 46′ 03"
9	Geraint Thomas (GBR)	Team Sky	+ 1h 59′ 26"
10	José Joaquín Rojas (ESP)	Caisse d'Epargne	+ 2h 01′ 19"

=== Team classification ===
Final team classification (1–10)
Rank	Team	Time
1	Team RadioShack	276h 02' 03"
2	Caisse d'Epargne	+ 9′ 15"
3	Rabobank	+ 27′ 48"
4	Ag2r–La Mondiale	+ 41′ 10"
5	Omega Pharma–Lotto	+ 51′ 01"
6	Astana	+ 56′ 16"
7	Quick-Step	+ 1h 06′ 23"
8	Euskaltel–Euskadi	+ 1h 23′ 02"
9	Liquigas–Doimo	+ 1h 29′ 14"
10	Bbox Bouygues Telecom	+ 1h 54′ 18″

== Bibliography ==
- Augendre, Jacques (2016). Guide historique [Historical guide] (PDF) (in French). Paris: Amaury Sport Organisation. Archived (PDF) from the original on 17 August 2016.
- Race regulations (PDF). Paris: Amaury Sport Organisation. 2010. Archived from the original (PDF) on 9 July 2010.
