= Julian Dean =

New Zealand cyclist (born 1975)

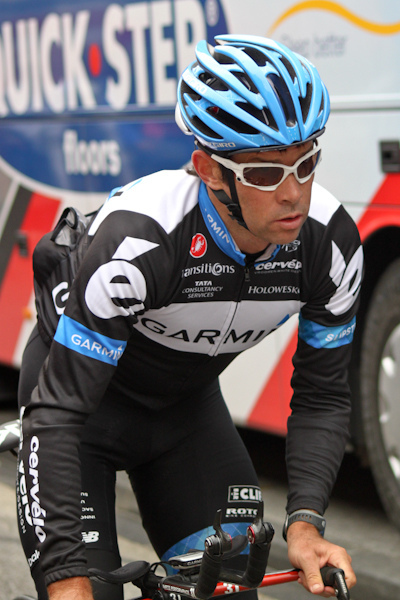
- Dean at the 2011 Critérium du Dauphiné.

Personal information
- Full name: Julian Dean
- Nicknames: Kiwi Guy, Julz, Skiddy, Grasshopper
- Born: 28 January 1975 (age 51) Waihi, New Zealand
- Height: 1.78 m (5 ft 10 in)
- Weight: 72 kg (159 lb)

Cycling career
- Sport: Cycling
- Current team: Team Jayco–AlUla
- Discipline: Road
- Role: Rider (retired); Directeur sportif
- Rider type: Sprinter; Lead-out Specialist

Professional teams
- 1999–2001: U.S. Postal Service
- 2002–2003: CSC–Tiscali
- 2004–2007: Crédit Agricole
- 2008–2011: Slipstream–Chipotle
- 2012–2013: GreenEDGE

Managerial team
- 2013–: Orica–GreenEDGE

Major wins
- 2010 Giro d'Italia, Stage 1 TTT; 2011 Tour de France, Stage 2 TTT; New Zealand National Road Race Champion 2007/08; Tour de Wallonie 2003; Points classification Tour of Britain 2004
Medal record
Representing New Zealand
Men's Cycling
Commonwealth Games
Bronze medal – third place	1994 Victoria	Team Pursuit

Julian Dean (born 28 January 1975) is a former professional road racing cyclist from New Zealand who competed as a professional between 1999 and 2013. He last rode for UCI World Tour team Orica–GreenEDGE, where he now works as an assistant sporting director and mentor. His main achievements include winning the 2007 and 2008 New Zealand National Road Race Championships, finishing 9th in the 2005 World Road Championships in Madrid, 10th place in the 2002 World Road Championships in Zolder and finishing second in Grand Tour stages four times. At the peak of his career he was considered the best lead out rider in the world, and was highly regarded by his teammate and friend Thor Hushovd.

== Early life ==
Born in Waihi, New Zealand, Dean is the son of Waimata dairy farmers Peter and Valerie Dean. Locally known as the "Grasshopper", started cycling when he was just a child, beginning at the local BMX club in, where he had success with two 3rd-place finishes in the New Zealand Championships. Dean tried his hand at many sports before moving onto triathlon, which he enjoyed. From triathlon, Dean fell in love with cycling, where he represented New Zealand in road and track disciplines. In 1997, Dean got his chance to race in the US with the Shaklee team and the Mercury cycling team in 1998.

== Career ==
=== US Postal ===
In 1999, Dean signed to the now-defunct US Postal Service Pro Cycling Team, whom he rode for until 2001, gaining experience from racing in Europe. He managed his first European victories with 2 stage wins in the tour of Britain. After having ridden in a team based around Lance Armstrong Dean went looking for new opportunities.

He got them by joining CSC–Tiscali in 2002. However, his joy was short-lived when Dean broke his leg in March 2002 and was out for three months. He took a stage win in the short stage race Tour de Wallonie taking the leaders jersey & holding on to win the overall race beating some of the world's best riders to the victory including a great tussle with Italy's star rider Michele Bartoli.

=== Credit Agricole ===
In 2004 he signed to Crédit Agricole as a lead-out man for sprinter Thor Hushovd. He finished 8th behind stage winner Tom Boonen in Stage 6 of the Tour de France. He missed the 2005 edition of the Tour due to an injury incurred in the 2005 Giro d'Italia. He later returned for the 2006 edition.

The 2007 cycling season started well with Dean winning the New Zealand Road Racing Champion title. This win entitled Dean to represent and wear the black and white New Zealand national cycling jersey whilst racing in all international road-racing events throughout the 2007 season. He continued to ride for the French-based team Crédit Agricole.

During the 2007 Tour de France, Dean was known for his role of lead-out for Thor Hushovd. Hushovd later said in interviews that Dean was "the best lead-out man in the world." Dean's last public appearance wearing the Crédit Agricole jersey was the 2007 Mt Maunganui criterium race, held on 27 December 2007. He won the elite category.

=== Slipstream-Chipotle ===
From 2008 to 2011, Dean rode for Jonathan Vaughters' team Slipstream–Chipotle. He once again started the year by winning the New Zealand national Road Racing Championship, held in January. He recorded six top-ten finishes in the 2008 Tour de France, with a best performance of fourth in stage 14. His overall classification was 110th, and 9th in the points competition.

In 2009, during the 13th stage of the Tour de France from Vittel to Colmar he, along with Óscar Freire of Rabobank got shot by an air rifle. He got shot in the thumb but was able to continue with a largely swollen hand where he eventually finished 112th on the stage. In completing the Tour de France, Dean became the only rider to start and finish all three grand tours during the 2009 season.

During the finish of stage 11 from Sisteron to Bourg les Valence in the Tour de France Dean was involved in a highly publicised incident with Mark Renshaw, who repeatedly headbutted Julian Dean, who he believed had come across into his lead out. Subsequently, Renshaw was disqualified from the Tour de France.

=== GreenEDGE ===
In October 2011 Dean confirmed his move to the new Australian professional cycling team, GreenEDGE. Dean believed "It [is] a hugely exciting development for cycling, especially in Australia and New Zealand" and that "With the quality of the team named, [he is] confident we'll get World Tour status straight away" which was subsequently achieved. Australian riders already signed to GreenEDGE include 2011 Milan – San Remo winner, Matthew Goss, Australian National Road Race Champion, Jack Bobridge, Australian National Time Trial Champion and 2011 Tour Down Under winner, Cameron Meyer, four time Tour de France runner up, Stuart O'Grady and three-time winner of the points classification in the Tour de France, Robbie McEwen. Julian had a training injury at the first GreenEDGE camp. In December 2012 Dean confirmed his retirement from racing, his final race will be the New Zealand National Road Race Championships on 13 January. He will continue to work with GreenEdge Cycling as an assistant sporting director and mentor.

== Grand Tour results ==
=== Tour de France ===
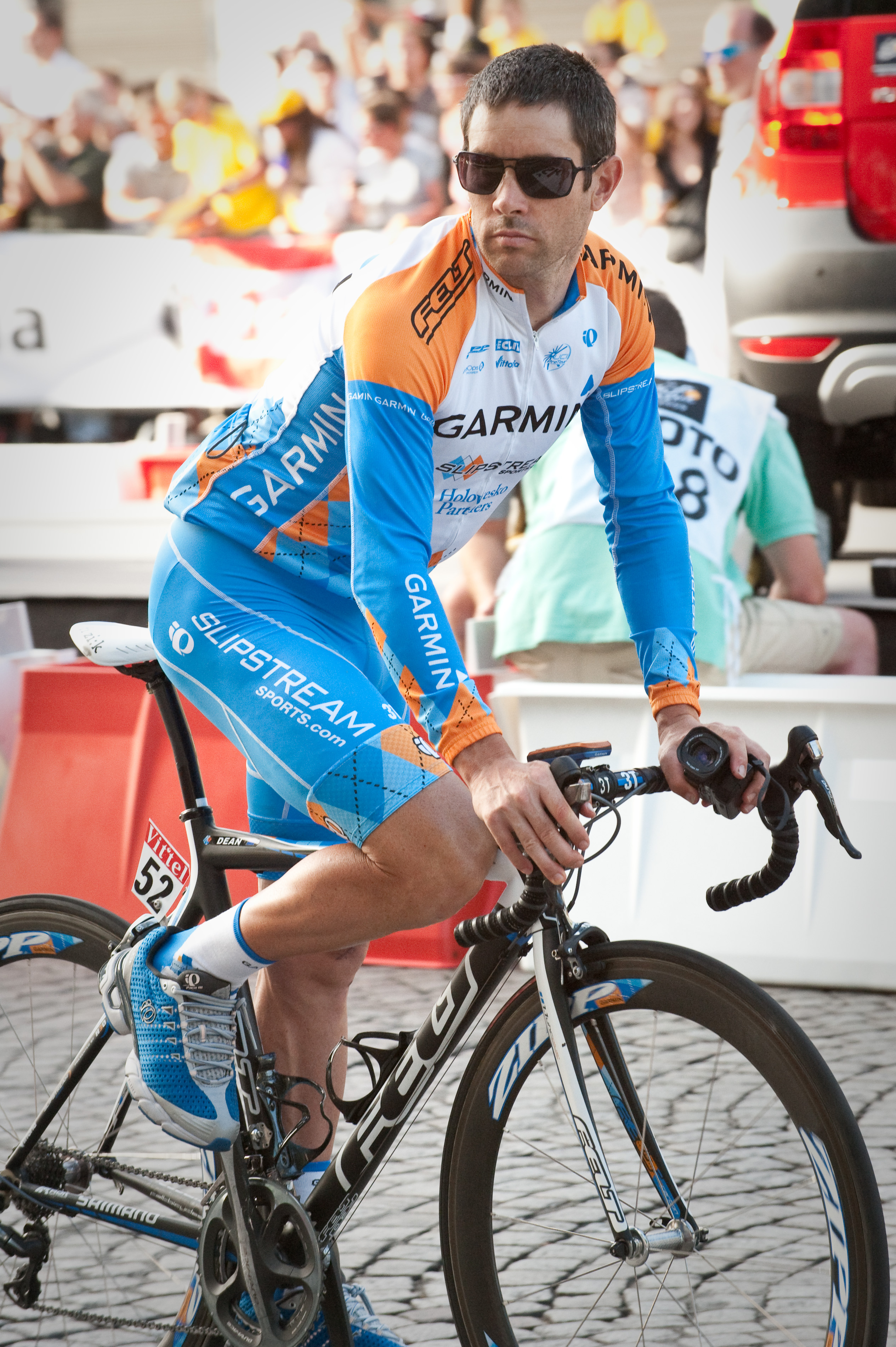
Dean at the 2009 Tour de France.

- 2004 : 127th
- 2006 : 127th
- 2007 : 107th
- 2008 : 110th
- 2009 : 121st
- 2010 : 157th, 2nd Stages 4 and 18, 3rd Stage 20
- 2011 : 145th

=== Giro d'Italia ===
- 2005 : Abandoned, Stage 6
- 2007 : 93rd
- 2008 : Did not start, Stage 19
- 2009 : 136th
- 2010 : Did not start Stage 19. 2nd Stage 18, 3rd Stage 10

=== Vuelta a España ===
- 1999 : 112th, 2nd Stage 21
- 2005 : Abandoned, Stage 15
- 2009 : 132nd
- 2010 : Did not start, Stage 13

== Personal life ==
Dean is married with two children. Dean is based in Rotorua, where he hopes to eventually be based permanently. In 2010 Dean competed in the Singlespeed Mountain Biking World Championships.

== Palmares ==
1993
3rd World U19 Team Pursuit Championship

1994
3rd Team Pursuit, Victoria, Commonwealth Games

1995
1st Kilometer Champion
Best All-Around Performance, New Zealand Track Championship

1996
1st Individual Pursuit champion
1st Points Race Champion
1st Tour of Somerville
1st stage Tour of Ohio
1st Red Rose Rocket Criterium
1st stage, Tour of Wellington

1997
1st Visalia Criterium
1st Santa Rosa Criterium

1998
1st Outdoor Life Network GP
1st Overall, US National Point Series
1st Visalia Criterium
1st stage, Tour LeFleur
1st sprint competition Redlands Classic

1999
1st Overall Tour of Wellington

1st Stage 11

Tour of Britain

1st Stages 2 & 7

2000
10th First Union USPRO Championships

2001
1st First Union Classic
1st Stage 4 Vuelta a Castilla y León

2002
10th World Road Race Championships
10th Paris–Tours

2003
1st Overall Tour de Wallonie

1st Stages 4 & 5

1st Wachovia Classic
1st Stage 2 Circuit Franco-Belge

2004
2nd Overall Tour of Britain

1st Points classification

2005
9th Road Race World Championships

2007
1st National Road Race Championships
1st National Criterium Championships

2008
1st National Road Race Championships
1st Stage 1 TTT Giro d'Italia
3rd Overall Tour of Ireland

2010
3rd National Road Race Championships

2011
1st Stage 2 TTT Tour de France

2013
3rd National Road Race Championships
