= 2005 UCI ProTour =

- First edition of the UCI ProTour

Details
- Dates: March 6 – October 15
- Location: Europe
- Races: 28

Champions
- Individual champion: Danilo Di Luca (ITA) (Liquigas–Bianchi)
- Teams' champion: Team CSC
- Nations' champion: Italy

The 2005 ProTour was the first year of the newly introduced UCI ProTour system, in which the ProTour teams are guaranteed, and obliged to, participate in the series of ProTour races. In certain ways the ProTour replaced the UCI Road World Cup series of one-day races, which in 2004 was won by one-day specialist Paolo Bettini for the third time in a row. The beginning of the ProTour saw difficult negotiations with the organizers of the Grand Tours, the Tour de France, the Giro d'Italia and the Vuelta a España.

== Spring classics ==
Following tradition, Team CSC had a strong showing in the early season, with a commanding control of the season opener Paris–Nice, placing American Bobby Julich on the top step of the General classification, combining his strong prologue individual time trial performance and good placing in the Mont Faron queen stage. Sprinter Alessandro Petacchi shed some weight over the winter and built up a strong base to win the classic Milan–San Remo convincingly, leading to speculation that he will be the undisputed Italian team leader for the World Cycling Championship in Madrid later in the season.

Belgian sprinter Tom Boonen of Quick-Step–Innergetic showed that he was the strongest kasseinfretter, or cobble-eater, by winning both the Tour of Flanders and Paris–Roubaix cobbled classics, propelling him to the top of the UCI ProTour rankings and thus earning him the white leaders jersey.

As the spring classics campaign continues, Bettini was plagued with injuries, but fellow one-day specialist Danilo Di Luca of Liquigas–Bianchi found his best form in years and won the Tour of the Basque Country race. With his confidence boosted, he topped his form with wins in both La Flèche Wallonne and the Amstel Gold Race, leading many to speculate that he would also win the Liège–Bastogne–Liège. However, Jens Voigt committed himself to long breakaways in both la Flèche and Liège, and in the later race was joined by Kazakh Alexander Vinokourov. Together they managed to keep the peloton behind, and Voigt was beaten in the final sprint by Vinokourov.

== Grand tours ==
Having earned the ProTour white leader's jersey, Di Luca further increased his lead with a stage win and fourth place in the general classification of the 2005 Giro d'Italia, joining Gilberto Simoni of Lampre–Caffita in igniting the queen mountain stage of Sestriere. The same race also saw Damiano Cunego, who finished at the top UCI ranking last year, fall ill. In the end, the descending skills and strong form of Paolo Savoldelli earned him the maglia rosa in Milan.

The 2005 Tour de France again brought Lance Armstrong to the win, extending his record for consecutive Tour wins to 7. Despite promises of igniting the race with the trio of Jan Ullrich, Andreas Klöden and Vinokourov, the T-Mobile Team failed to wrestle the race control from Armstrong's Discovery team, and allegations flew abound of internal dispute within the team. Instead Ivan Basso showed himself as a main contender, though he never seemed to pressure Armstrong. As in the previous editions, Armstrong's team launched a vicious attack on an early mountain stage to discourage other contenders from pursuing the top podium. Spanish racer Alejandro Valverde of Illes Balears–Caisse d'Epargne showed that he is a serious contender for the future by not only staying with Armstrong, but by sprinting away to win the stage at the finale. However, both Valverde and green jersey contender Tom Boonen were forced to quit due to injuries.

The Vuelta brought an exciting race in which Denis Menchov was able to stave off attacks by Roberto Heras and his strong Liberty Seguros–Würth team until the closing days of the race. A choreographed attack by Liberty Seguros climbers, and Heras' thrilling ride down a treacherous descent, finally won him the leader's jersey. However, a doping scandal erupted two months after the Vuelta. Urine samples taken from Heras after the final time trial proved to be positive for EPO. Heras was stripped of what had been his record-setting fourth win, and Menchov was elevated to first place.

== World championships ==
Belgian Tom Boonen had the confidence of the entire Belgian team, and won in style in Madrid. Petacchi, despite being the favorite, claimed to have suffered from a cold, and could not keep in contention as the peloton ascended the last climb before the finale. Valverde, having taken the Spanish team leadership after the injury of Óscar Freire, overcame his own injury to finish second, his second podium placing in race that tactically was not well-suited to his style.

The finale brought an exciting race as Paolo Bettini, having regained his form, was unleashed a little too late by Italian selector Franco Ballerini and nearly stayed away with Vinokourov in the closing meters of the race.

== Summer and Autumn Classics ==
Having been left off the Tour de France lineup, Erik Zabel decided to join fellow sprinter Petacchi in the newly formed Team Milram. As his last race with the T-Mobile team, Zabel took the sprinters classic Paris–Tours to end his career in style.

Smarting from his disappointment at the World Championships, Bettini won Züri-Metzgete convincingly, with a 40-km solo attack in the rain that was almost derailed by his chain dropping off his chainring after his first acceleration. Proving that he is a better climber than ever before, he won the climbers classic Giro di Lombardia in a three-way sprint with Gilberto Simoni and Fränk Schleck.

== 2005 ProTour results ==
Date	Race	Country	Winner	Team
March 6–13	Paris–Nice	France	Bobby Julich (USA)	Team CSC
March 9–15	Tirreno–Adriatico	Italy	Óscar Freire (ESP)	Rabobank
March 19	Milan–San Remo	Italy	Alessandro Petacchi (ITA)	Fassa Bortolo
April 3	Tour of Flanders	Belgium	Tom Boonen (BEL)	Quick-Step–Innergetic
April 5–9	Tour of the Basque Country	Spain	Danilo Di Luca (ITA)	Liquigas–Bianchi
April 6	Gent–Wevelgem	Belgium	Nico Mattan (BEL)	Davitamon–Lotto
April 10	Paris–Roubaix	France	Tom Boonen (BEL)	Quick-Step–Innergetic
April 17	Amstel Gold Race	Netherlands	Danilo Di Luca (ITA)	Liquigas–Bianchi
April 20	La Flèche Wallonne	Belgium	Danilo Di Luca (ITA)	Liquigas–Bianchi
April 24	Liège–Bastogne–Liège	Belgium	Alexander Vinokourov (KAZ)	T-Mobile Team
April 26 – May 1	Tour de Romandie	Switzerland	Santiago Botero (COL)	Phonak
May 7–29	Giro d'Italia	Italy	Paolo Savoldelli (ITA)	Discovery Channel
May 16–22	Volta a Catalunya	Spain	Yaroslav Popovych (UKR)	Discovery Channel
June 5–12	Critérium du Dauphiné Libéré	France	Íñigo Landaluze (ESP)	Euskaltel–Euskadi
June 11–19	Tour de Suisse	Switzerland	Aitor González (ESP)	Euskaltel–Euskadi
June 19	Eindhoven Team Time Trial	Netherlands	team event	Gerolsteiner
July 2–24	Tour de France	France	~~Lance Armstrong (USA)~~	Discovery Channel
July 31	HEW Cyclassics	Germany	Filippo Pozzato (ITA)	Quick-Step–Innergetic
August 3–10	Eneco Tour of Benelux	Belgium; Netherlands	Bobby Julich (USA)	Team CSC
August 13	Clásica de San Sebastián	Spain	Constantino Zaballa (ESP)	Saunier Duval–Prodir
August 15–23	Deutschland Tour	Germany	Levi Leipheimer (USA)	Gerolsteiner
August 27–18	Vuelta a España	Spain	Roberto Heras (ESP)	Liberty Seguros–Würth
August 28	GP Ouest-France	France	George Hincapie (USA)	Discovery Channel
September 12–18	Tour de Pologne	Poland	Kim Kirchen (LUX)	Fassa Bortolo
September 25	Road World Championships	Spain	Tom Boonen (BEL)	Quick-Step–Innergetic
October 2	Züri-Metzgete	Switzerland	Paolo Bettini (ITA)	Quick-Step–Innergetic
October 9	Paris–Tours	France	Erik Zabel (GER)	T-Mobile Team
October 15	Giro di Lombardia	Italy	Paolo Bettini (ITA)	Quick-Step–Innergetic

== 2005 ProTour Points System ==
	Tour de France	Giro d'Italia Vuelta a España	Milan–San Remo Tour of Flanders Paris–Roubaix Liège–Bastogne–Liège Giro di Lombardia Lesser stageraces	Lesser one-day races	World Cycling Championship
Overall Classement
1	100	85	50	40	50
2	75	65	40	30	40
3	60	50	35	25	35
4	55	45	30	20	
5	50	40	25	15	
6	45	35	20	11	
7	40	30	15	7	
8	35	26	10	5	
9	30	22	5	3	
10	25	19	1	1	
11	20	16			
12	15	13			
13	12	11			
14	9	9			
15	7	7			
16	5	5			
17	4	4			
18	3	3			
19	2	2			
20	1	1			
Stage wins (if applicable)
1	3	3	1		
2	2	2			
3	1	1			

=== 2005 ProTour Individual Rankings ===
	Rider	Team	Points
1	Danilo Di Luca (ITA)	Liquigas–Bianchi	229
2	Tom Boonen (BEL)	Quick-Step–Innergetic	171
3	Davide Rebellin (ITA)	Gerolsteiner	151
4	Jan Ullrich (GER)	T-Mobile Team	140
5	Lance Armstrong (USA)	Discovery Channel	139
6	Alexander Vinokourov (KAZ)	T-Mobile Team	136
7	Levi Leipheimer (USA)	Gerolsteiner	131
8	Paolo Bettini (ITA)	Quick-Step–Innergetic	130
9	Bobby Julich (USA)	Team CSC	130
10	George Hincapie (USA)	Discovery Channel	129
11	Alessandro Petacchi (ITA)	Fassa Bortolo	128
12	Gilberto Simoni (ITA)	Lampre–Caffita	111
13	Fränk Schleck (LUX)	Team CSC	110
14	Denis Menchov (RUS)	Rabobank	109
15	Francisco Mancebo (ESP)	Illes Balears–Caisse d'Epargne	107

=== Team Rankings ===
	Team	Points
1	(Denmark) Team CSC	390
2	(Switzerland) Phonak	353
3	(Netherlands) Rabobank	349
4	(Belgium) Davitamon–Lotto	322
5	(Spain) Liberty Seguros–Würth	320
6	(Germany) Gerolsteiner	303
7	(Spain) Saunier Duval–Prodir	293
8	(United States) Discovery Channel	274
9	(France) Crédit Agricole	264
10	(Spain) Illes Balears–Caisse d'Epargne	262
11	(France) Cofidis	258
12	(Belgium) Quick-Step–Innergetic	253
13	(Italy) Fassa Bortolo	245
14	(Germany) T-Mobile Team	244
15	(Italy) Liquigas–Bianchi	228
16	(Italy) Lampre–Caffita	211
17	(France) Bouygues Télécom	183
18	(Italy) Domina Vacanze	161
19	(Spain) Euskaltel–Euskadi	147
20	(France) Française des Jeux	130

Team classification winner got 20 points, second 19, third 18 etc. Wildcard teams didn't score points, but ProTour teams didn't move up either. For example, no team received 20 points in Vuelta as team competition was won by Comunidad Valenciana.

=== 2005 ProTour Nation Rankings ===
	Country	Points
1	Italy	749
2	United States	559
3	Spain	459
4	Germany	405
5	Australia	307
6	Belgium	304
7	Netherlands	280
8	Luxembourg	191
9	France	163
10	Russia	153
11	Kazakhstan	144
12	Switzerland	131
13	Colombia	119
14	Ukraine	101
15	Denmark	97
16	Norway	72
17	Sweden	67
18	Austria	62
19	Slovenia	53
20	Czech Republic	15
21	New Zealand	7
22	Estonia	3
23	Croatia	1
