= List of UCI ProTour records =

This is a list of records of the UCI ProTour cycling competition. Bold entries indicate the record-holder is still a professional cyclist. Updated at the end of 2007 UCI ProTour.

== Most ==
=== Most UCI ProTour Championships ===
	Cyclist	Country	Wins
1	Alejandro Valverde	Spain	2 (2006, 2008)
2	Danilo di Luca	Italy	1 (2005)
3	Cadel Evans	Australia	1 (2007)

=== Most UCI ProTour points (career) ===
	Cyclist	Country	Points
1	Alejandro Valverde	Spain	562
2	Cadel Evans	Australia	508
3	Davide Rebellin	Italy	420
4	Samuel Sánchez	Spain	413
5	Tom Boonen	Belgium	412

=== Most UCI ProTour points (single season) ===
	Cyclist	Country	Points
1	Alejandro Valverde	Spain	285 (2006)
2	Cadel Evans	Australia	247 (2007)
3	Danilo di Luca	Italy	229 (2005)

=== Most UCI ProTour victories ===
	Cyclist	Country	Victories
1	Alessandro Petacchi	Italy	24
2	Robbie McEwen	Australia	19
3	Tom Boonen	Belgium	17

=== Most UCI ProTour victories in one season ===
	Cyclist	Country	Victories
1	Alessandro Petacchi	Italy	15 (2005)
2	Tom Boonen	Belgium	8 (2006)
2	Alessandro Petacchi	Italy	8 (2007)

== Youngest and oldest ==
=== Oldest UCI ProTour Champion ===
	Cyclist	Country	Age
1	Cadel Evans	Australia	30 years, 249 days (2007)
2	Danilo di Luca	Italy	29 years, 273 days (2005)
3	Alejandro Valverde	Spain	26 years, 159 days (2006)

=== Youngest UCI ProTour Champion ===
	Cyclist	Country	Age
1	Alejandro Valverde	Spain	26 years, 159 days (2006)
2	Danilo di Luca	Italy	29 years, 273 days (2005)
3	Cadel Evans	Australia	30 years, 249 days (2007)

=== Oldest winner of a UCI ProTour race ===
	Cyclist	Country	Age
1	Jens Voigt	Germany	35 years, 325 days (2007 Deutschland Tour)
2	Davide Rebellin	Italy	35 years, 259 days (2007 La Flèche Wallonne)
3	Erik Zabel	Germany	35 years, 124 days (2005 Paris–Tours)

=== Youngest winner of a UCI ProTour race ===
	Cyclist	Country	Age
1	Thomas Dekker	Netherlands	21 years, 220 days (2006 Tirreno–Adriatico)
2	Vincenzo Nibali	Italy	21 years, 286 days (2006 GP Ouest France-Plouay)
3	Marcus Burghardt	Germany	23 years, 285 days (2007 Gent–Wevelgem)

=== Oldest winner of a UCI ProTour stage ===
	Cyclist	Country	Age
1	Erik Zabel	Germany	37 years, 63 days (2007 Vuelta a España)
2	Cédric Vasseur	France	36 years, 334 days (2007 Tour de France)
3	Roberto Laiseka	Spain	36 years, 81 days (2005 Vuelta a España)

=== Youngest winner of a UCI ProTour stage ===
	Cyclist	Country	Age
1	Gerald Ciolek	Germany	19 years, 319 days (2006 Deutschland Tour)
2	Rigoberto Urán	Colombia	20 years, 148 days (2007 Tour de Suisse)
3	Thomas Dekker	Netherlands	21 years, 12 days (2005 Tour de Pologne)

- In the list of youngest and oldest winners, only first or last victory is shown.

== Most wins ==
=== Most Wins in UCI ProTour races ===
	Cyclist	Country	Victories
1	Danilo di Luca	Italy	5
2	Tom Boonen	Belgium	4
3	Paolo Bettini	Italy	3
3	Óscar Freire	Spain	3
3	Stefan Schumacher	Germany	3

=== Most wins in a UCI ProTour race ===
	Cyclist	Country	Wins
1	Tom Boonen	Belgium	2 (Tour of Flanders)
1	Paolo Bettini	Italy	2 (Giro di Lombardia)
1	Jens Voigt	Germany	2 (Deutschland Tour)

=== Most wins in UCI ProTour races (teams) ===
	Team	Total wins	Grand Tours	Shorter stageraces	One-day races	Team time trials
1	Team CSC	10	1	4	3	2
2	Quick Step-Innergetic	8	0	0	8	0
3	Liquigas	7	1	1	5	0
3	Gerolsteiner	7	0	4	2	1

=== Most stage wins in UCI ProTour races (teams) ===
	Team	Total wins	Grand Tours	Shorter stageraces
1	Team CSC	32	15	19
2	Rabobank	31	14	17
3	Quick Step-Innergetic	30	13	17

- All 22 teams which have been part of UCI ProTour have won at least one stage. Additionally 13 wildcard teams have won the stage. This includes AG2R Prévoyance and Unibet.com, which won the stage as a wildcard, and have later on granted UCI ProTour license.
- Note: Some teams may have changed name since the start of UCI ProTour
