= 2005 Giro d'Italia =

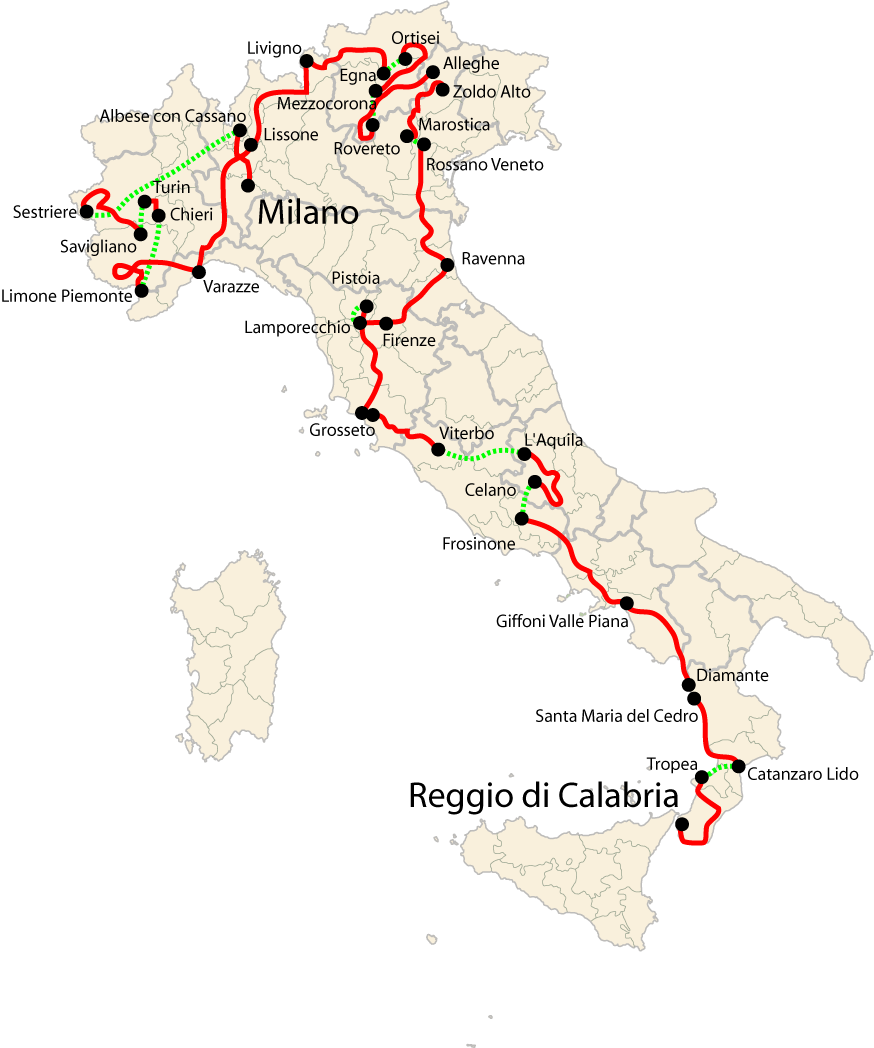
- Overview of the stages: route from Reggio di Calabria to Milan covered by the riders on the bicycle (red) and distances between stages (green)

Race details
- Dates: 7 – 29 May 2005
- Stages: 20 + Prologue
- Distance: 3,447.15 km (2,142 mi)
- Winning time: 91h 25’ 51”

Results
| Jersey awarded to the overall winner | Winner | Paolo Savoldelli (ITA) | (Discovery Channel) |
| | Second | Gilberto Simoni (ITA) | (Lampre–Caffita) |
| | Third | José Rujano (VEN) | (Colombia–Selle Italia) |
| Jersey awarded to the points classification winner | Points | Paolo Bettini (ITA) | (Quick-Step–Innergetic) |
| Jersey awarded to the mountains classification winner | Mountains | José Rujano (VEN) | (Colombia–Selle Italia) |
| | Combativity | José Rujano (VEN) | (Colombia–Selle Italia) |
| Jersey awarded to the intergiro classification winner | Intergiro | Stefano Zanini (ITA) | (Quick-Step–Innergetic) |
| | Team | Liquigas–Bianchi | |
| | Team points | Davitamon–Lotto | |

The 2005 Giro d'Italia was the 88th edition of the Giro d'Italia, one of cycling's Grand Tours. It began in Reggio Calabria with a 1.15 km (0.7 mi) prologue. The race came to a close with a 119 km (73.9 mi) mass-start road stage that stretched from Albese con Cassano to Milan. Twenty-two teams entered the race that was won by the Italian Paolo Savoldelli of the Discovery Channel team. Second and third were the Italian Gilberto Simoni and Venezuelan José Rujano.

Five riders led the race over eight occasions before Savoldelli gained the lead after the Giro's thirteenth stage. The Giro was first led by Australian Brett Lancaster, who won the race's opening prologue. He lost the lead the next day to Paolo Bettini, who gained the race lead three separate times before Savoldelli took over. Ivan Basso was the leader of the race for two days, before he lost the lead to Savoldelli who then held that lead until the race's conclusion.

Having previously won the general classification in 2002, Savoldelli became the nineteenth rider to repeat as winner of the Giro d'Italia. Amongst the other classifications that the race awarded, Paolo Bettini of the Quick-Step–Innergetic team won the points classification, Selle Italia Colombia rider José Rujano won the mountains classification, and Italian Stefano Zanini won the intergiro classification. Liquigas–Bianchi finished as the winners of the Trofeo Fast Team classification, ranking each of the twenty-two teams contesting the race by lowest cumulative time. The other team classification, the Trofeo Super Team classification, where the teams' riders are awarded points for placing within the top twenty in each stage and the points are then totaled for each team was won by Davitamon–Lotto.

== Teams ==
Twenty-two teams were invited by the race organizers to participate in the 2005 edition of the Giro d'Italia. Twenty of the teams were UCI ProTour teams, while Ceramica Panaria-Navigare and Colombia-Selle Italia were wild card teams invited by the organizers. Each team sent a squad of nine riders, which meant that the race started with a peloton of 198 cyclists. From the riders that began the race, 153 made it to the finish in Milan.

The teams entering the race were:

- Bouygues Télécom
- Ceramica Panaria–Navigare
- Cofidis
- Colombia–Selle Italia
- Crédit Agricole
- Davitamon–Lotto
- Discovery Channel
- Domina Vacanze
- Euskaltel–Euskadi
- Fassa Bortolo
- Française des Jeux
- Gerolsteiner
- Illes Balears–Caisse d'Epargne
- Lampre–Caffita
- Liberty Seguros–Würth
- Liquigas–Bianchi
- Phonak
- Quick-Step–Innergetic
- Rabobank
- Saunier Duval–Prodir
- Team CSC
- T-Mobile Team

== Route and stages ==
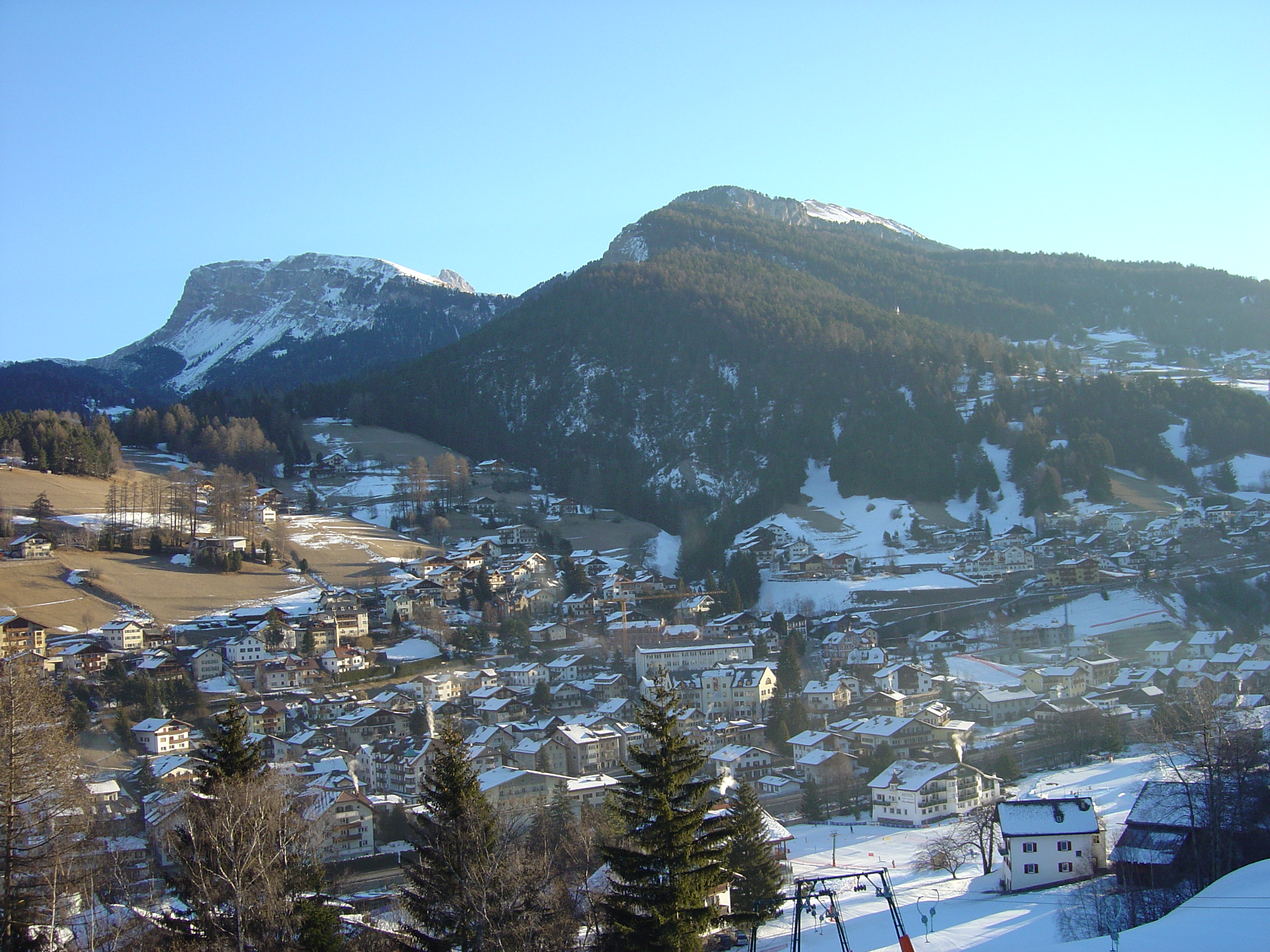
The town of Urtijëi hosted the end of the 218 km (135 mi) thirteenth stage, which was classified as a summit finish.

The route for the 2005 Giro d'Italia was unveiled by race director Angelo Zomegnan on 23 January 2005 in Milan. It contained three time trial events, all of which were individual. The organizers divided the remaining eighteen stages into three categories: flat stages, medium mountain stages, and mountain stages. Ten of the stages were declared flat stages. Of the eight stages remaining, three stages were designated medium mountain stages and five were ranked as mountain stages. In the stages containing categorized climbs, four had summit finishes: stage 11, to Zoldo Alto; stage 13, to Urtijëi; stage 17, to Colle di Tenda; and stage 19, to Sestriere. The organizers chose to include two rest days. When compared to the previous year's race, the race was 23.25 km (14 mi) longer, contained the same amount of rest days and one more individual time trial event. In addition, both races contained a prologue to open the race.

The fifteenth was originally intended to be 205 km (127 mi) and to start in Livigno. However, due to very poor weather conditions the start was moved to Villa di Tirano, and the stage was shortened to 154 km (96 mi). The route originally had the riders crossing the Forcola di Livigno, a mountain located 10 km (6 mi) outside of the original start in Livigno, but due to the bad weather at the base and top of the climb the organizers were forced to exclude the pass.

Stage characteristics and winners
| Stage | Date | Course | Distance | Type | Winner |
|---|---|---|---|---|---|
| P | 7 May | Reggio Calabria | 1.15 km (1 mi) | Individual time trial | Brett Lancaster (AUS) |
| 1 | 8 May | Reggio Calabria to Tropea | 208 km (129 mi) | Flat stage | Paolo Bettini (ITA) |
| 2 | 9 May | Catanzaro Lido to Santa Maria del Cedro | 182 km (113 mi) | Flat stage | Robbie McEwen (AUS) |
| 3 | 10 May | Diamante to Giffoni Valle Piana | 205 km (127 mi) | Flat stage | Danilo Di Luca (ITA) |
| 4 | 11 May | Giffoni Valle Piana to Frosinone | 211 km (131 mi) | Flat stage | Luca Mazzanti (ITA) |
| 5 | 12 May | Celano to L'Aquila | 223 km (139 mi) | Medium mountain stage | Danilo Di Luca (ITA) |
| 6 | 13 May | Viterbo to Marina di Grosseto | 153 km (95 mi) | Flat stage | Robbie McEwen (AUS) |
| 7 | 14 May | Grosseto to Pistoia | 211 km (131 mi) | Medium mountain stage | Koldo Gil (ESP) |
| 8 | 15 May | Lamporecchio to Florence | 45 km (28 mi) | Individual time trial | David Zabriskie (USA) |
| 9 | 16 May | Florence to Ravenna | 139 km (86 mi) | Flat stage | Alessandro Petacchi (ITA) |
| | 17 May | Rest day | | | |
| 10 | 18 May | Ravenna to Rossano Veneto | 212 km (132 mi) | Flat stage | Robbie McEwen (AUS) |
| 11 | 19 May | Marostica to Zoldo Alto | 150 km (93 mi) | Mountain stage | Paolo Savoldelli (ITA) |
| 12 | 20 May | Alleghe to Rovereto | 178 km (111 mi) | Medium mountain stage | Alessandro Petacchi (ITA) |
| 13 | 21 May | Mezzocorona to Urtijëi | 218 km (135 mi) | Mountain stage | Iván Parra (COL) |
| 14 | 22 May | Neumarkt to Livigno | 210 km (130 mi) | Mountain stage | Iván Parra (COL) |
| 15 | 23 May | Villa di Tirano to Lissone | 154 km (96 mi) | Flat stage | Alessandro Petacchi (ITA) |
| | 24 May | Rest day | | | |
| 16 | 25 May | Lissone to Varazze | 210 km (130 mi) | Flat stage | Christophe Le Mével (FRA) |
| 17 | 26 May | Varazze to Limone Piemonte | 194 km (121 mi) | Mountain stage | Ivan Basso (ITA) |
| 18 | 27 May | Chieri to Turin | 34 km (21 mi) | Individual time trial | Ivan Basso (ITA) |
| 19 | 28 May | Savigliano to Sestriere | 190 km (118 mi) | Mountain stage | José Rujano (VEN) |
| 20 | 29 May | Albese con Cassano to Milan | 119 km (74 mi) | Flat stage | Alessandro Petacchi (ITA) |
| | Total | | 3,447.15 km (2,142 mi) | | |

== Race overview ==
The Giro began with a 1.15 km (0.7 mi) prologue that navigated through the streets of Reggio Calabria. The event was won by Australian Brett Lancaster who won by a .289 second margin over the second placed rider Matteo Tosatto. After the last competing rider took the course, famed sprinter Mario Cipollini took the course for a final farewell after announcing his retirement ten days beforehand. The Giro's first stage came down to an uphill, bunch sprint that Paolo Bettini won. Along with the stage victory, Bettini took the overall lead of the race. The second stage ended in another sprint finish, which Robbie McEwen won and also saw him take the race lead. Stage 3 saw a breakaway go the distance as a group of fifty riders broke free about 30 km (18.6 mi) from the finish. Liquigas-Bianchi's Danilo Di Luca lunged ahead of Damiano Cunego to win the stage, while the race lead fell back into Bettini's hands. The fourth stage closed with a sprint finish that Italian Paolo Bettini won. However, Bettini was later disqualified after the judges saw that he caused fellow sprinter Baden Cooke to fall, which gave the stage victory to second-place finisher Luca Mazzanti.

The seventh stage saw a breakaway succeed again, as Liberty Seguros-Würth rider Koldo Gil took the downhill stage win. Danilo Di Luca regained the lead of the race as the time gaps widened due to the climb that was placed shortly before the finish. Stage eight was a 45 km (28 mi) individual time trial that was won by American David Zabriskie. Di Luca placed tenth overall and maintain the race leader's pink jersey, while the general classification contenders Ivan Basso and Paolo Savoldelli gained valuable seconds over Di Luca. Alessandro Petacchi won the next stage by means of a bunch sprint, while the general classification remained largely unaltered. Stage 10 took place after a rest day. The stage again came down to a bunch sprint that was won by Australian Robbie McEwen, who captured his second stage win of the Giro.

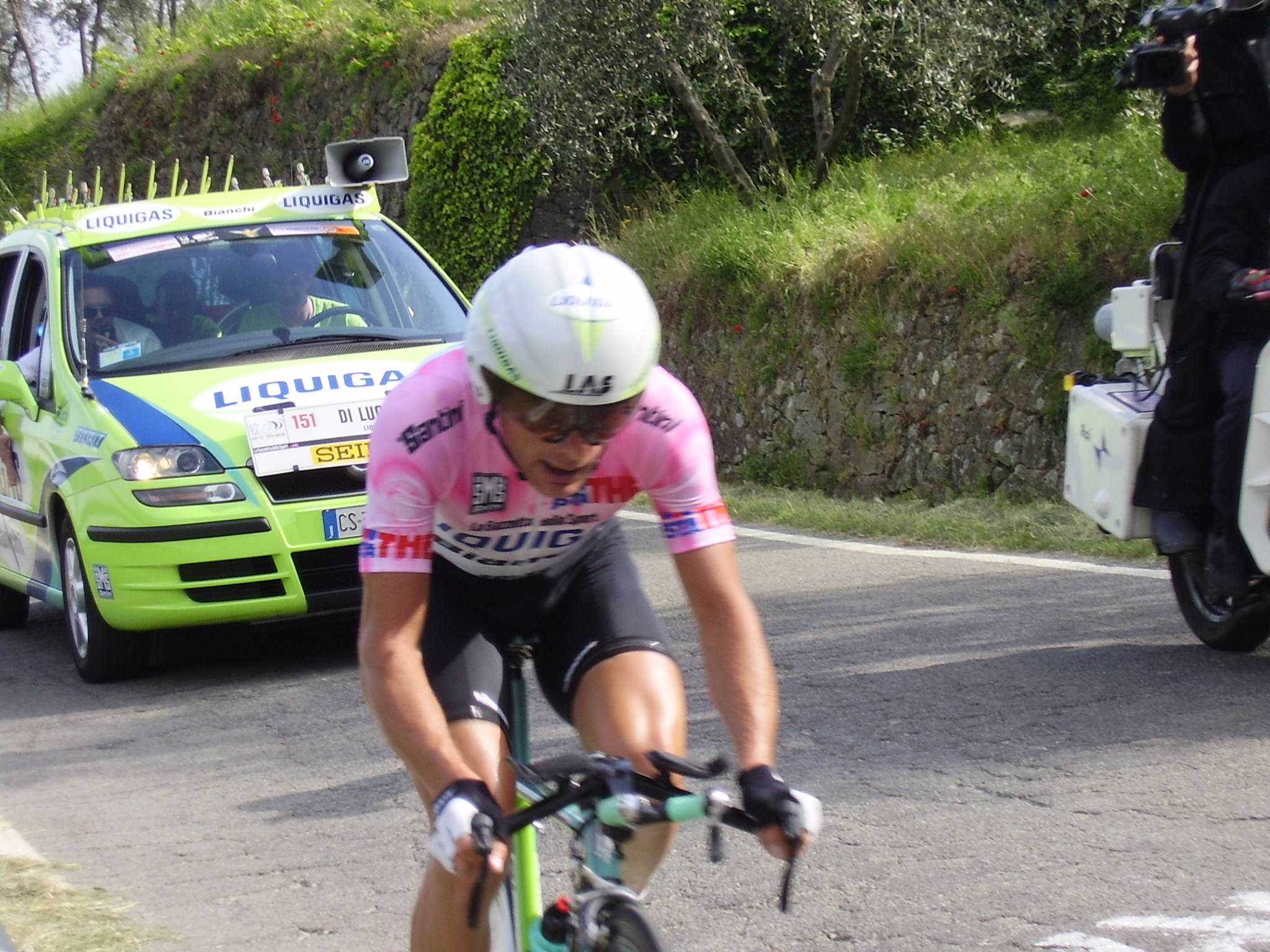
Then race leader Danilo di Luca riding during the stage 8 individual time trial

Stage 11 was the first big mountain stage of the 2005 Giro d'Italia and it began with a breakaway that was eventually swept after the first climb of the day. Ivan Basso attacked with 26 km (16 mi) remaining in the stage and only Paolo Savoldelli was able to keep pace with him. The two raced to the top of the Zoldo Alto and Savoldelli won the sprint to the line, while Basso claimed the race lead. The twelfth stage of the race was downhill after the lone categorized climb of the Passo san Pellegrino. The stage ultimately came down to a field sprint, which Alessandro Petacchi won. The Giro's thirteenth stage saw a breakaway succeed as Colombian Iván Parra beat out his fellow breakaway members for the stage win. Paolo Savoldelli claimed the overall lead after Ivan Basso lost over a minute as he was suffering from a gastric problem. The next stage, stage 14, contained the Cima Coppi of the 2005 Giro d'Italia, the Passo dello Stelvio, along with other climbs of lesser severity. Iván Parra struck again by winning the stage by almost two minutes over the second-place finisher. Ivan Basso lost even more time due to his illness, while general classification contenders Danilo Di Luca and Gilberto Simoni gained valuable seconds over the race leader Paolo Savoldelli.

The fifteenth stage's start was moved from Livigno to Villa di Tirano and the route was shortened by 51 km (32 mi) due to poor weather conditions on the stage's first scheduled mountain pass, the Forcola di Livigno. With the exclusion of the uphill earlier portion of the stage, the route was relatively flat which led to the stage ending in a bunch sprint that Fassa Bortolo's Alessandro Petacchi won. After the second rest day, the riders began stage sixteen of the Giro. A breakaway containing eighteen men got away from the peloton and stayed away for the length of the stage. Christophe Le Mével out-sprinted his fellow breakaway members to win the stage and earn his first professional victory. The race's seventeenth stage contained a summit finish on the Colle di Tenda. While on the final climb of the day, the race was headed by a lead group that contained the race leader Paolo Savoldelli and general classification favorites Ivan Basso and José Rujano. Basso slipped away with 6 km (4 mi) left to go in the climb and win the stage.

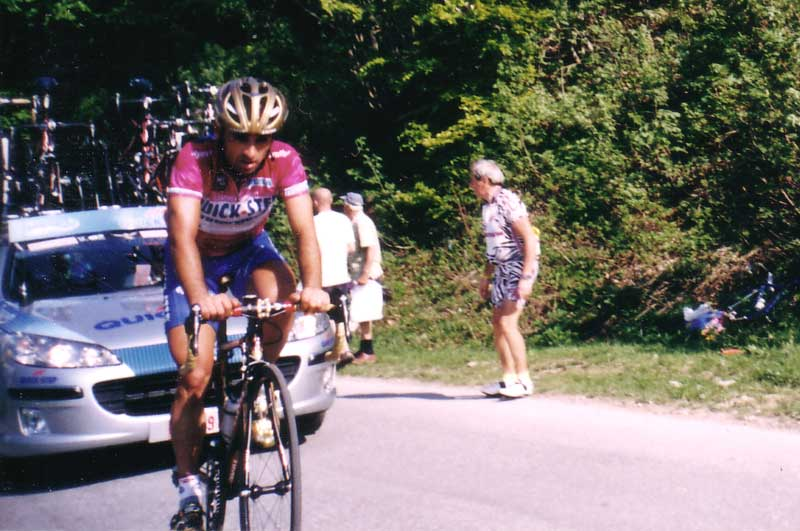
Paolo Bettini wearing the purple jersey as leader of points classification while climbing the Colle di Tenda during stage 17

Stage 18 was an individual time trial that stretched 34 km (21 mi) Chieri to Turin. Team CSC's Ivan Basso won the stage by nine seconds over Russian Vladimir Karpets. The penultimate stage of the Giro featured a summit finish on the fabled Sestriere. The race leader Paolo Savoldelli was in trouble throughout the stage and his lead was in jeopardy. However, on the final climb of the Sestriere he received aid from two riders and made it to the finish two minutes after the stage winner José Rujano. Savoldelli's lead shrank to twenty-eight seconds over the second placed rider Gilberto Simoni. The twentieth and final stage of the 2005 Giro d'Italia came ended with a bunch sprint in the streets of Milan. Italian Alessandro Petacchi edged out Erik Zabel and Robert Förster to win the stage. Savoldelli won his second Giro d'Italia after crossing the finish in 24th place on the stage.

Success in stages was limited to ten of the competing teams, six of which achieved multiple stage victories, while five individual riders won multiple stages. The riders that won more than once were Robbie McEwen in stages 2, 6, 10, Danilo di Luca in stages 3 and 5, Alessandro Petacchi in stages 9, 12, 15, and 20, and Iván Parra in stages 13 and 14, and Ivan Basso in stages 17 and 18. Ceramica Panaria–Navigare won two stages, with Brett Lancaster in the prologue and Luca Mazzanti in stage 4. Davitamon–Lotto won three stages with Robbie McEwen. Liquigas–Bianchi won two stages with Danilo di Luca. Team CSC won three stages, with David Zabriskie in the stage 8 time trial and two stages with Ivan Basso. Fassa Bortolo won four stages with Alessandro Petacchi. Colombia–Selle Italia won three stages, with Iván Parra in two stages and José Rujano in stage 19. Quick-Step–Innergetic, Liberty Seguros–Würth, Discovery Channel, and Crédit Agricole each won one stage at the Giro d'Italia. Quick Step-Innergetic's Paolo Bettini won stage 1 by out-sprinting the rest of the field. Liberty Seguros-Würth rider Koldo Gil won stage 7 by means of a long breakaway. Discovery Channel's Paolo Savoldelli won stage 11 through a last second attack, as did Crédit Agricole rider Christophe Le Mével in stage 16.

== Classification leadership ==
Four different jerseys were worn during the 2005 Giro d'Italia. The leader of the general classification – calculated by adding the stage finish times of each rider, and allowing time bonuses for the first three finishers on mass-start stages – wore a pink jersey. This classification is the most important of the race, and its winner is considered as the winner of the Giro.

For the points classification, which awarded a purple (or cyclamen) jersey to its leader, cyclists were given points for finishing a stage in the top 15; additional points could also be won in intermediate sprints. The green jersey was awarded to the mountains classification leader. In this ranking, points were won by reaching the summit of a climb ahead of other cyclists. Each climb was ranked as either first, second or third category, with more points available for higher category climbs. The Cima Coppi, the race's highest point of elevation, awarded more points than the other first category climbs. The Cima Coppi for this Giro was the Passo dello Stelvio. The first rider to cross the Stelvio was Selle Italia Colombia's José Rujano. The intergiro classification was marked by a blue jersey. The calculation for the intergiro is similar to that of the general classification, in each stage there is a midway point that the riders pass through a point and where their time is stopped. As the race goes on, their times compiled and the person with the lowest time is the leader of the intergiro classification and wears the blue jersey. Although no jersey was awarded, there was also one classification for the teams, in which the stage finish times of the best three cyclists per team were added; the leading team was the one with the lowest total time.

There were also two classifications for the teams. The classification was the Trofeo Fast Team. In this classification, the times of the best three cyclists per team on each stage were added; the leading team was the team with the lowest total time; the Trofeo Super Team was a team points classification, with the top 20 placed riders on each stage earning points (20 for first place, 19 for second place and so on, down to a single point for 20th) for their team.

The rows in the following table correspond to the jerseys awarded after that stage was run.

Classification leadership by stage
| Stage | Winner | General classification | Points classification | Mountains classification | Intergiro classification | Trofeo Fast Team | Trofeo Super Team |
|---|---|---|---|---|---|---|---|
| P | Brett Lancaster | Brett Lancaster | not awarded | not awarded | not awarded | Fassa Bortolo | not awarded |
| 1 | Paolo Bettini | Paolo Bettini | Paolo Bettini | Thorwald Veneberg | Sven Krauß | Liquigas–Bianchi | Davitamon–Lotto |
| 2 | Robbie McEwen | Robbie McEwen | Robbie McEwen | Thorwald Veneberg | Sven Krauß | Liquigas–Bianchi | Davitamon–Lotto |
| 3 | Danilo di Luca | Paolo Bettini | Robbie McEwen | Dario Cioni | Sven Krauß | Liquigas–Bianchi | Liquigas–Bianchi |
| 4 | Luca Mazzanti | Paolo Bettini | Paolo Bettini | Dario Cioni | Sven Krauß | Liquigas–Bianchi | Liquigas–Bianchi |
| 5 | Danilo di Luca | Danilo di Luca | Danilo di Luca | José Rujano | Sven Krauß | Liquigas–Bianchi | Liquigas–Bianchi |
| 6 | Robbie McEwen | Paolo Bettini | Robbie McEwen | José Rujano | Sven Krauß | Liquigas–Bianchi | Davitamon–Lotto |
| 7 | Koldo Gil | Danilo di Luca | Danilo di Luca | Koldo Gil | Sven Krauß | Lampre–Caffita | Liquigas–Bianchi |
| 8 | David Zabriskie | Danilo di Luca | Danilo di Luca | Koldo Gil | Sven Krauß | Liquigas–Bianchi | Liquigas–Bianchi |
| 9 | Alessandro Petacchi | Danilo di Luca | Danilo di Luca | Koldo Gil | Sven Krauß | Liquigas–Bianchi | Liquigas–Bianchi |
| 10 | Robbie McEwen | Danilo di Luca | Robbie McEwen | Koldo Gil | Sven Krauß | Liquigas–Bianchi | Davitamon–Lotto |
| 11 | Paolo Savoldelli | Ivan Basso | Robbie McEwen | José Rujano | Sven Krauß | Liquigas–Bianchi | Davitamon–Lotto |
| 12 | Alessandro Petacchi | Ivan Basso | Robbie McEwen | José Rujano | Sven Krauß | Liquigas–Bianchi | Davitamon–Lotto |
| 13 | Iván Parra | Paolo Savoldelli | Paolo Bettini | José Rujano | Sven Krauß | Liquigas–Bianchi | Davitamon–Lotto |
| 14 | Iván Parra | Paolo Savoldelli | Danilo di Luca | José Rujano | Sven Krauß | Liquigas–Bianchi | Liquigas–Bianchi |
| 15 | Alessandro Petacchi | Paolo Savoldelli | Paolo Bettini | José Rujano | Paolo Bettini | Liquigas–Bianchi | Davitamon–Lotto |
| 16 | Christophe Le Mével | Paolo Savoldelli | Paolo Bettini | José Rujano | Paolo Bettini | Liquigas–Bianchi | Davitamon–Lotto |
| 17 | Ivan Basso | Paolo Savoldelli | Paolo Bettini | José Rujano | Stefano Zanini | Liquigas–Bianchi | Davitamon–Lotto |
| 18 | Ivan Basso | Paolo Savoldelli | Paolo Bettini | José Rujano | Stefano Zanini | Liquigas–Bianchi | Davitamon–Lotto |
| 19 | José Rujano | Paolo Savoldelli | Paolo Bettini | José Rujano | Stefano Zanini | Liquigas–Bianchi | Davitamon–Lotto |
| 20 | Alessandro Petacchi | Paolo Savoldelli | Paolo Bettini | José Rujano | Stefano Zanini | Liquigas–Bianchi | Davitamon–Lotto |
| Final | | Paolo Savoldelli | Paolo Bettini | José Rujano | Stefano Zanini | Liquigas–Bianchi | Davitamon–Lotto |

== Final standings ==
Legend
| Pink jersey | Denotes the winner of the General classification | Green jersey | Denotes the winner of the Mountains classification |
| Purple jersey | Denotes the winner of the Points classification | Blue jersey | Denotes the winner of the Intergiro classification |

=== General classification ===
| | Rider | Team | Time |
|---|---|---|---|
| 1 | Paolo Savoldelli (ITA) | Discovery Channel | 91h 25' 51" |
| 2 | Gilberto Simoni (ITA) | Lampre–Caffita | + 28" |
| 3 | José Rujano (VEN) | Colombia–Selle Italia | + 45" |
| 4 | Danilo Di Luca (ITA) | Liquigas–Bianchi | + 2' 42" |
| 5 | Juan Manuel Gárate (ESP) | Saunier Duval–Prodir | + 3' 11" |
| 6 | Serhiy Honchar (UKR) | Domina Vacanze | + 4' 22" |
| 7 | Vladimir Karpets (RUS) | Illes Balears–Caisse d'Epargne | + 11' 15" |
| 8 | Pietro Caucchioli (ITA) | Crédit Agricole | + 11' 38" |
| 9 | Marzio Bruseghin (ITA) | Fassa Bortolo | + 11' 40" |
| 10 | Emanuele Sella (ITA) | Ceramica Panaria–Navigare | + 12' 33" |

=== Points classification ===
| | Rider | Team | Points |
|---|---|---|---|
| 1 | Paolo Bettini (ITA) | Quick-Step–Innergetic | 162 |
| 2 | Alessandro Petacchi (ITA) | Fassa Bortolo | 154 |
| 3 | Danilo Di Luca (ITA) | Liquigas–Bianchi | 136 |
| 4 | Paolo Savoldelli (ITA) | Discovery Channel | 124 |
| 5 | Ivan Basso (ITA) | Team CSC | 114 |
| 6 | Erik Zabel (GER) | T-Mobile Team | 92 |
| 7 | José Rujano (VEN) | Colombia–Selle Italia | 89 |
| 8 | Isaac Gálvez (ESP) | Illes Balears–Caisse d'Epargne | 85 |
| 9 | Gilberto Simoni (ITA) | Lampre–Caffita | 81 |
| 10 | Iván Parra (COL) | Colombia–Selle Italia | 80 |

=== Mountains classification ===
| | Rider | Team | Points |
|---|---|---|---|
| 1 | José Rujano (VEN) | Colombia–Selle Italia | 143 |
| 2 | Iván Parra (COL) | Colombia–Selle Italia | 57 |
| 3 | Gilberto Simoni (ITA) | Lampre–Caffita | 45 |
| 4 | Ivan Basso (ITA) | Team CSC | 41 |
| 5 | Danilo Di Luca (ITA) | Liquigas–Bianchi | 29 |
| 6 | Patrice Halgand (FRA) | Crédit Agricole | 27 |
| 7 | Juan Manuel Gárate (ESP) | Illes Balears–Caisse d'Epargne | 27 |
| 8 | Paolo Savoldelli (ITA) | Discovery Channel | 17 |
| 9 | Ruslan Ivanov (MDA) | Domina Vacanze | 15 |
| 10 | Daniel Atienza (ESP) | Cofidis | 14 |

=== Intergiro classification ===
| | Rider | Team | Time |
|---|---|---|---|
| 1 | Stefano Zanini (ITA) | Quick-Step–Innergetic | 54h 37' 01" |
| 2 | Paolo Bettini (ITA) | Quick-Step–Innergetic | + 27" |
| 3 | Sven Krauß (GER) | Gerolsteiner | + 30" |
| 4 | Bram Schmitz (NED) | T-Mobile Team | + 2' 16" |
| 5 | Ivan Basso (ITA) | Team CSC | + 2' 31" |
| 6 | Paolo Savoldelli (ITA) | Discovery Channel | + 2' 41" |
| 7 | David Zabriskie (USA) | Team CSC | + 2' 52" |
| 8 | Philippe Schnyder (SUI) | Colombia–Selle Italia | + 3' 00" |
| 9 | Ángel Gómez (ESP) | Saunier Duval–Prodir | + 3' 04" |
| 10 | Dariusz Baranowski (POL) | Liberty Seguros–Würth | + 3' 06" |

=== Trofeo Fast Team classification ===
| | Team | Time |
|---|---|---|
| 1 | Liquigas–Bianchi | 274h 42' 31" |
| 2 | Crédit Agricole | + 24' 28" |
| 3 | Lampre–Caffita | + 29' 21" |
| 4 | Domina Vacanze | + 32' 27" |
| 5 | Illes Balears–Caisse d'Epargne | + 1h 8' 29" |
| 6 | Davitamon–Lotto | + 1h 21' 34" |
| 7 | Ceramica Panaria–Navigare | + 1h 24' 50" |
| 8 | Liberty Seguros–Würth | + 1h 26' 50" |
| 9 | Saunier Duval–Prodir | + 1h 37' 32" |
| 10 | Phonak | + 1h 49' 00" |

=== Trofeo Super Team classification ===
| | Team | Points |
|---|---|---|
| 1 | Davitamon–Lotto | 347 |
| 2 | Liquigas–Bianchi | 316 |
| 3 | Lampre–Caffita | 311 |
| 4 | Fassa Bortolo | 296 |
| 5 | Illes Balears–Caisse d'Epargne | 224 |
| 6 | Quick-Step–Innergetic | 224 |
| 7 | Crédit Agricole | 213 |
| 8 | Gerolsteiner | 210 |
| 9 | Lampre–Caffita | 208 |
| 10 | Discovery Channel | 204 |

=== Minor classifications ===
Other less well-known classifications, whose leaders did not receive a special jersey, were awarded during the Giro. Other awards included the Combativity classification, which was a compilation of points gained for position on crossing intermediate sprints, mountain passes and stage finishes. Venezuelan José Rujano won the most combative classification. The Azzurri d'Italia classification was based on finishing order, but points were awarded only to the top three finishers in each stage. Alessandro Petacchi won the Azzurri d'Italia classification. The Trofeo Fuga Piaggio classification rewarded riders who took part in a breakaway at the head of the field, each rider in an escape of ten or fewer riders getting one point for each kilometre that the group stayed clear. The classification was won by Sven Krauß. Teams were given penalty points for minor technical infringements. Fassa Bortolo and T-Mobile Team were most successful in avoiding penalties, and so shared leadership of the Fair Play classification.
