= Domina Vacanze =

Domina Vacanze is an Italian hotel group who has sponsored multiple cycling teams:

- Aurum Hotels (1996–2007), known as Domina Vacanze in 2004
- De Nardi (1999–2005), known as Domina Vacanze in 2005
