= 2009 Scheldeprijs =

Race details
- Dates: 15 April 2009
- Stages: 1
- Distance: 200 km (124.3 mi)
- Winning time: 4h 27' 20"

Results
	Winner	Alessandro Petacchi (ITA)	(LPR Brakes–Farnese Vini)
	Second	Kenny van Hummel (NED)	(Skil–Shimano)
	Third	Dominique Rollin (CAN)	(Cervélo TestTeam)

The 2009 Scheldeprijs cycling race took place on 15 April 2009. It was the 97th running of the Scheldeprijs. A breakaway of Lorenzo Bernucci, Matthé Pronk, Pavel Brutt and Jeff Louder formed after 80 km, and stayed free of the peloton until 9 km to go. Bernucci, of LPR Brakes–Farnese Vini, attacked again when the lead group was caught and was joined once more by Brutt, of Team Katusha. The two were caught again by the Quickstep-led peloton at 4 km to go. A bunch sprint ensued, won by Alessandro Petacchi. Robbie McEwen, Tom Boonen and Greg Van Avermaet crashed 200 m from the finish when their wheels touched.

== Results ==
	Cyclist	Team	Time
1	Alessandro Petacchi (ITA)	LPR Brakes–Farnese Vini	4h 27' 20"
2	Kenny van Hummel (NED)	Skil–Shimano	+ 0"
3	Dominique Rollin (CAN)	Cervélo TestTeam	+ 0"
4	Antonio Cruz (USA)	BMC Racing Team	+ 0"
5	Peter Wrolich (AUT)	Team Milram	+ 0"
6	Harald Starzengruber (AUT)	Elk Haus	+ 0"
7	Björn Schröder (GER)	Team Milram	+ 0"
8	José Antonio Carrasco (ESP)	Andalucía–Cajasur	+ 0"
9	Bernhard Eisel (AUT)	Team Columbia–High Road	+ 0"
10	James Vanlandschoot (BEL)	Verandas Willems	+ 0"
