= Giro della Provincia di Lucca =

Cycling competition

Race details
- Date: Early March
- Region: Province of Lucca, Italy
- English name: Tour of Province of Lucca
- Local name(s): Giro della Provincia di Lucca (in Italian)
- Discipline: Road
- Competition: UCI Europe Tour
- Type: Single-day

History
- First edition: 1999
- Editions: 8
- Final edition: 2006
- First winner: Paolo Bettini (ITA)
- Most wins: Alessandro Petacchi (ITA) (2 wins)
- Final winner: Alessandro Petacchi (ITA)

The Giro della Provincia di Lucca was a professional road bicycle race held annually in Province of Lucca, Italy held between 1999 and 2006. From 2005, the race was organized as a 1.1 event on the UCI Europe Tour, previously being a stage race.

== Winners ==
Year	Country	Rider	Team
1999	Italy	Paolo Bettini	Mapei–Quick-Step
2000	Italy	Alessandro Petacchi	Fassa Bortolo
2001	Belgium	Mario Aerts	Lotto–Adecco
2002	Italy	Fabiano Fontanelli	Mercatone Uno–Stream TV
2003	Spain	Óscar Freire	Rabobank
2004	Italy	Alessandro Bertolini	Alessio–Bianchi
2005	Italy	Mario Cipollini	Liquigas–Bianchi
2006	Italy	Alessandro Petacchi	Team Milram
