= UCI ProTour =

Cycling competition under the Union Cycliste Internationale

- Sport: Road bicycle racing
- Founded: 2005
- Folded: 2010
- No. of teams: 19 (Others invited on race by race basis)
- Countries: International
- Last champions: Alejandro Valverde (2008); Caisse d'Epargne (2008); Spain (2008)

The UCI ProTour was a series of road bicycle races in Europe, Australia and Canada organised by the UCI (International Cycling Union). Created by Hein Verbruggen, former president of the UCI, it comprises a number of 'ProTour' cycling teams, each of whom are required to compete in every round of the series. It was initially the basis of a season long competition for rankings points, created for 2005 to replace the UCI Road World Cup series, which ended at the end of the 2004 season (although the World Cup did not include any stage races). The ProTour was the subject of continuing disputes involving the UCI, cycling teams, and the organizers of the world's most prominent bicycle races (most notably, the Grand Tours), and in 2009 and 2010 the ranking element of the ProTour was superseded by the UCI World Ranking. For 2011, the ProTour and World Ranking were fully merged into the UCI World Tour. ProTour status for teams – relabelled UCI ProTeams – will continue as the highest level of registration, and will carry the right and obligation to participate in all World Tour races.

== Licensing ==
The ProTour licences are given to a maximum of 20 teams, to which sponsors must commit multiple years of sponsorship (4 years at the ProTour's inauguration). The exception to this rule was the Phonak team, which was given only a two-year licence due to previous doping allegations. Licence holders can apply for registration each year, which is dependent upon a check on contracts and budgets.

After 2005, the Fassa Bortolo and Domina Vacanze teams folded and the vacant places were given to AG2R Prévoyance and Team Milram respectively. Following the 2006 season the designated replacement principal sponsor for the Phonak Hearing Systems team, iShares, pulled its support as a results of the Floyd Landis doping scandal and the team was disbanded. The Unibet.com Cycling Team received Phonak's ProTour license, and the Swiss-based, Kazakh-backed Astana Team received the license previously owned by Manolo Saiz and his Liberty Seguros–Würth. Unibet.com and Discovery Channel discontinued after the 2007 season, bringing down the number of ProTour teams to 18. At the end of 2008, another two teams dropped out: Crédit Agricole and Gerolsteiner. Their licenses were taken over by Garmin–Slipstream and Team Katusha. Bbox Bouygues Telecom and Cofidis were denied licence renewals for the 2010 season, and new licences were given to Team Sky and Team RadioShack. Although Lampre–Farnese Vini had had its licence renewed until 2013, its registration (a separate process from licensing, concerning finances) for 2010 season was temporarily rejected, but restored after they had missed one race. UCI bylaws were later changed to require a team to be registered before its license is granted or renewed, to avoid a repeat of this situation.

== History ==
Season-long competitions for professional road racing were first instituted in 1948, and continued until the late 1980s when the UCI instituted the UCI Road World Cup series which ran until 2004.

In replacing the World Cup, the ProTour was designed to follow the format of the Formula One motor-racing series, and was intended to address several concerns:

- The Grand Tours were not part of the UCI Road World Cup series
- Different riders and different teams targeted different types of races, making direct comparisons difficult
- Team sponsorships tended to last only a very few years
- Many teams had financial difficulty in paying their riders and staff members
- Several teams had been plagued by doping issues

The UCI lobbied the organizers of the Grand Tours to participate in the ProTour, and was successful in obtaining their agreement despite prior disagreements and threats to completely pull out of the ProTour.

The ProTour has been criticized for not having a system in place for a timely upgrade and downgrade of teams from/to the lower-tier UCI Continental Circuits.

== UCI versus Grand Tour organisers ==
Originally, UCI and the organisers of the Grand Tours had been unable to come to terms on the 2006 UCI ProTour, with the result that the status of both the Grand Tours and some of the other races organised by those organisations behind the Grand Tours was unclear until well into the season, but they were eventually included.

During the 2007 UCI ProTour season, the ASO, RCS and Unipublic, organisers of the Tour de France, Giro d'Italia and Vuelta a España respectively, remained at odds with each other. The primary reason was that grand tour organisers wanted more freedom to invite popular national teams (e.g., UCI Professional Continental teams) and the right to exclude some UCI ProTour teams such as Unibet.com. Failure to achieve agreement lead UCI chairman Pat McQuaid to send a letter in February 2008 to all professional teams urging them to boycott Paris–Nice because it was an 'outlawed' race. In response, the AIGCP (Association International des Groupes Cyclistes Professionels) announced that the teams had unanimously decided to take part in Paris–Nice, the organisation of which was to be taken over by the French Cycling Federation. Quick Step team manager Patrick Lefevere commented: "I'm more than fed up with all the arguing. ASO and UCI don't know how much damage they are doing to the sport. What am I supposed to tell my sponsors? This conflict has been going on for three years and is escalating all the time. Can the teams be certain that they will be able to take part in the Tour de France later in the year?".

From 2008, the ProTour was largely devalued by the withdrawal from its calendar of the three Grand Tours, namely the Tour de France, Giro d'Italia and Vuelta a España, as well as the early-season stage race Paris–Nice and key single-day events such as Paris–Roubaix, Milan–San Remo, Liège–Bastogne–Liège, La Flèche Wallonne and the Giro di Lombardia.

On 15 July 2008, the 17 ProTour teams participating in the 2008 Tour de France announced that none of them would seek ProTour licenses for the 2009 season, but in the end all but two of them re-committed. In 2008 the Tour Down Under in Australia became the first ProTour event to be held outside Europe.

In 2009 UCI and organizers had agreement that events will be counted towards UCI World Ranking, which also included, in its first two seasons, Professional Continental teams. Grand Tour organizers kept the right to choose teams for the races, and also some of the teams chose not to race certain races. From 2011, all races on the World Calendar, those that yield World Ranking points, are to be classified as World Tour events, and the Pro Tour as a distinct series of races is to be discontinued.

== Events ==
Key:

- : Included in ProTour
- : Race held, but not as part of ProTour
- N/A: Race not held, or not as elite professional race

| Date | Race | Country | Type | 2005 | 2006 | 2007 | 2008 | 2009 | 2010 |
|---|---|---|---|---|---|---|---|---|---|
| Mid-late January | Tour Down Under | Australia | 1-week stage | No | No | No | Yes | Yes | Yes |
| Early-mid March | Paris–Nice | France | 1-week stage | Yes | Yes | Yes | No | No | No |
| Early-mid March | Tirreno–Adriatico | Italy | 1-week stage | Yes | Yes | Yes | No | No | No |
| Mid March | Milan–San Remo | Italy | 1-day | Yes | Yes | Yes | No | No | No |
| Mid May (2005–2009); Late March (2010) | Volta a Catalunya | Spain | 1-week stage | Yes | Yes | Yes | Yes | Yes | Yes |
| Late March – early April | Gent–Wevelgem | Belgium | 1-day | Yes | Yes | Yes | Yes | Yes | Yes |
| Early April | Tour of Flanders | Belgium | 1-day | Yes | Yes | Yes | Yes | Yes | Yes |
| Early April | Tour of the Basque Country | Spain | 1-week stage | Yes | Yes | Yes | Yes | Yes | Yes |
| Early April | Paris–Roubaix | France | 1-day | Yes | Yes | Yes | No | No | No |
| Mid April | Amstel Gold Race | Netherlands | 1-day | Yes | Yes | Yes | Yes | Yes | Yes |
| Mid April | La Flèche Wallonne | Belgium | 1-day | Yes | Yes | Yes | No | No | No |
| Mid-late April | Liège–Bastogne–Liège | Belgium | 1-day | Yes | Yes | Yes | No | No | No |
| Late April – early May | Tour de Romandie | Switzerland | 1-week stage | Yes | Yes | Yes | Yes | Yes | Yes |
| May – early June | Giro d'Italia | Italy | 3-week stage | Yes | Yes | Yes | No | No | No |
| Early June | Critérium du Dauphiné | France | 1-week stage | Yes | Yes | Yes | Yes | Yes | Yes |
| Mid June | Tour de Suisse | Switzerland | 1-week stage | Yes | Yes | Yes | Yes | Yes | Yes |
| Mid June | Eindhoven Team Time Trial | Netherlands | Team time trial | Yes | Yes | Yes | —N/a | —N/a | —N/a |
| July | Tour de France | France | 3-week stage | Yes | Yes | Yes | No | No | No |
| Early-mid August | Deutschland Tour | Germany | 1-week stage | Yes | Yes | Yes | Yes | —N/a | —N/a |
| Mid August | Clásica de San Sebastián | Spain | 1-day | Yes | Yes | Yes | Yes | Yes | Yes |
| Early-mid September (Early August from 2009) | Tour de Pologne | Poland | 1-week stage | Yes | Yes | Yes | Yes | Yes | Yes |
| Mid-late August (Early August in 2005) | Eneco Tour | Belgium; Netherlands | 1-week stage | Yes | Yes | Yes | Yes | Yes | Yes |
| Late August – September | Vuelta a España | Spain | 3-week stage | Yes | Yes | Yes | No | No | No |
| Late August (2005–2010) | GP Ouest-France | France | 1-day | Yes | Yes | Yes | Yes | Yes | Yes |
| Late July (2005–2006); August – September (since 2007) | EuroEyes Cyclassics (former HEW / Vattenfall Cyclassics) | Germany | 1-day | Yes | Yes | Yes | Yes | Yes | Yes |
| Early-mid September | Grand Prix Cycliste de Québec | Canada | 1-day | —N/a | —N/a | —N/a | —N/a | —N/a | Yes |
| Early-mid September | Grand Prix Cycliste de Montréal | Canada | 1-day | —N/a | —N/a | —N/a | —N/a | —N/a | Yes |
| Early October | Züri-Metzgete | Switzerland | 1-day | Yes | Yes | —N/a | —N/a | —N/a | —N/a |
| Early-mid October | Paris–Tours | France | 1-day | Yes | Yes | Yes | No | No | No |
| Mid October | Giro di Lombardia | Italy | 1-day | Yes | Yes | Yes | No | No | No |

== History of team participation ==
Dark grey indicates that the team was not operating in the year in question. Mid-grey indicates that the team was competing at a lower level in the year in question.

| 2005 | 2006 | 2007 | 2008 | 2009 | 2010 |
|---|---|---|---|---|---|
| Bouygues Télécom | Bouygues Télécom | Bouygues Télécom | Bouygues Télécom | Bbox Bouygues Telecom | Bbox Bouygues Telecom |
| Cofidis | Cofidis | Cofidis | Cofidis | Cofidis | Cofidis |
| Crédit Agricole | Crédit Agricole | Crédit Agricole | Crédit Agricole | | |
| Davitamon–Lotto | Davitamon–Lotto | Predictor–Lotto | Silence–Lotto | Silence–Lotto | Omega Pharma–Lotto |
| Discovery Channel | Discovery Channel | Discovery Channel | | | |
| Domina Vacanze | | | | | |
| Euskaltel–Euskadi | Euskaltel–Euskadi | Euskaltel–Euskadi | Euskaltel–Euskadi | Euskaltel–Euskadi | Euskaltel–Euskadi |
| Fassa Bortolo | | | | | |
| Française des Jeux | Française des Jeux | Française des Jeux | Française des Jeux | Française des Jeux | Française des Jeux |
| Gerolsteiner | Gerolsteiner | Gerolsteiner | Gerolsteiner | | |
| Illes Balears–Banesto | Caisse d'Epargne–Illes Balears | Caisse d'Epargne | Caisse d'Epargne | Caisse d'Epargne | Caisse d'Epargne |
| Lampre–Caffita | Lampre–Fondital | Lampre–Fondital | Lampre | Lampre–NGC | Lampre–Farnese Vini |
| Liberty Seguros–Würth | Liberty Seguros–Würth | | | | |
| Liquigas–Bianchi | Liquigas | Liquigas | Liquigas | Liquigas | Liquigas–Doimo |
| Phonak | Phonak | | | | |
| Quick-Step–Innergetic | Quick-Step–Innergetic | Quick-Step–Innergetic | Quick-Step | Quick-Step | Quick-Step |
| Rabobank | Rabobank | Rabobank | Rabobank | Rabobank | Rabobank |
| Saunier Duval–Prodir | Saunier Duval–Prodir | Saunier Duval–Prodir | Saunier Duval–Scott | Fuji–Servetto | Footon–Servetto–Fuji |
| T-Mobile Team | T-Mobile Team | T-Mobile Team | Team High Road | Team Columbia–High Road | Team HTC–Columbia |
| Team CSC | Team CSC | Team CSC | Team CSC | Team Saxo Bank | Team Saxo Bank |
| AG2R Prévoyance | AG2R Prévoyance | AG2R Prévoyance | Ag2r–La Mondiale | Ag2r–La Mondiale | Ag2r–La Mondiale |
| | Team Milram | Team Milram | Team Milram | Team Milram | Team Milram |
| | | Astana | Astana | Astana | Astana |
| | Unibet.com | Unibet.com | Cycle Collstrop | | |
| | | Slipstream–Chipotle | Slipstream–Chipotle | Garmin–Slipstream | Garmin–Transitions |
| | | | | Team Katusha | Team Katusha |
| | | | | | Team RadioShack |
| | | | | | Team Sky |
| | | BMC Racing Team | BMC Racing Team | BMC Racing Team | BMC Racing Team |
| | | | | Vacansoleil | Vacansoleil |
| Shimano–Memory Corp | Skil–Shimano | Skil–Shimano | Skil–Shimano | Skil–Shimano | Skil–Shimano |

== UCI ProTour winners ==
| Year | Top Ranked Individual | Top Ranked Team | Top Ranked Nation |
|---|---|---|---|
| 2005 | Danilo Di Luca (ITA); Liquigas–Bianchi | Team CSC | Italy |
| 2006 | Alejandro Valverde (ESP); Caisse d'Epargne–Illes Balears | Team CSC | Spain |
| 2007 | Cadel Evans (AUS); Predictor–Lotto | Team CSC | Spain |
| 2008 | Alejandro Valverde (ESP); Caisse d'Epargne | Caisse d'Epargne | Spain |

In 2009 and 2010, the season-long competition element of the ProTour was replaced by the 2009 UCI World Ranking and the 2010 UCI World Ranking.

== See also ==
- Union Cycliste Internationale (UCI)
- List of UCI ProTour records

== Bibliography ==
- Luca Rebeggiani/Davide Tondani: Organizational Forms in Professional Cycling – Efficiency Issues of the UCI Pro Tour (describes strengths and weaknesses of the UCI ProTour from a social scientists' point of view)
