= 2007 Gent–Wevelgem =

Race details
- Dates: 11 April 2007
- Stages: 1
- Distance: 207 km (129 mi)
- Winning time: 4h 52' 14"

Results
	Winner	Marcus Burghardt (GER)	(T-Mobile Team)
	Second	Roger Hammond (GBR)	(T-Mobile Team)
	Third	Óscar Freire (ESP)	(Rabobank)

The 69th edition of the Belgian Gent–Wevelgem cycling race was held over 207 km between Deinze and Wevelgem on 11 April 2007. The winner was Marcus Burghardt of the T-Mobile Team.

The day began in Deinze with overcast weather and light winds. This gave way to a quick start and it was not until after the first intermediate sprint that the initial break of Florent Brard, Christophe Mengin, and Roger Hammond. The leaders were allowed a substantial lead (eleven minutes) for a semi-classic, which forced the peloton ride aggressively over the final 100 km.

During the descents of the Kemmelberg, several riders crashed on the wet cobblestones and were severely injured after a rider swerved to avoid a fallen water bottle. Amongst them were Jimmy Casper (broken nose, broken collarbone, broken wrist), Wim De Vocht (broken thumb), James Vanlandschoot (broken thumb, wrist and elbow), Andy Cappelle (broken elbow and fractured shoulder), Marco Velo (broke his knee, collarbone and 2 ribs), Wilfried Cretskens (several contusions), Aart Vierhouten, Tyler Farrar, Luke Roberts, Fabio Sacchi, Mathew Hayman, Matthew Wilson and Heinrich Haussler. This caused splits in the peloton and an elite group of riders were left to chase down the lead trio.

Eventually Marcus Burghardt, Francisco Ventoso, and Óscar Freire joined the leaders with roughly 25 km to go. The six managed to hold off the remaining peloton and, with less than 1 km to go, Burghardt caught Freire by surprise and made the winning move. Burghardt's teammate, Hammond, managed to catch hold of Freire's wheel and overtook the Spaniard in the sprint for a T-Mobile Team one-two finish.

== General Standings ==
2007-04-11, Gent–Wevelgem, 210 km (130 mi)

	Cyclist	Team	Time	UCI ProTour Points
1	Marcus Burghardt (GER)	T-Mobile Team	4h 52' 14"	40
2	Roger Hammond (GBR)	T-Mobile Team	+ 4"	30
3	Óscar Freire (ESP)	Rabobank	+ 5"	25
4	Francisco Ventoso (ESP)	Saunier Duval–Prodir	+ 6"	20
5	Christophe Mengin (FRA)	Française des Jeux	+ 6"	15
6	Robbie McEwen (AUS)	Predictor–Lotto	+ 15"	11
7	Max van Heeswijk (NED)	Rabobank	+ 15"	7
8	Baden Cooke (AUS)	Unibet.com	+ 15"	5
9	José Joaquín Rojas (ESP)	Caisse d'Epargne	+ 15"	3
10	Alexandre Usov (BLR)	AG2R Prévoyance	+ 15"	1
