= Elia Rigotto =

Italian cyclist

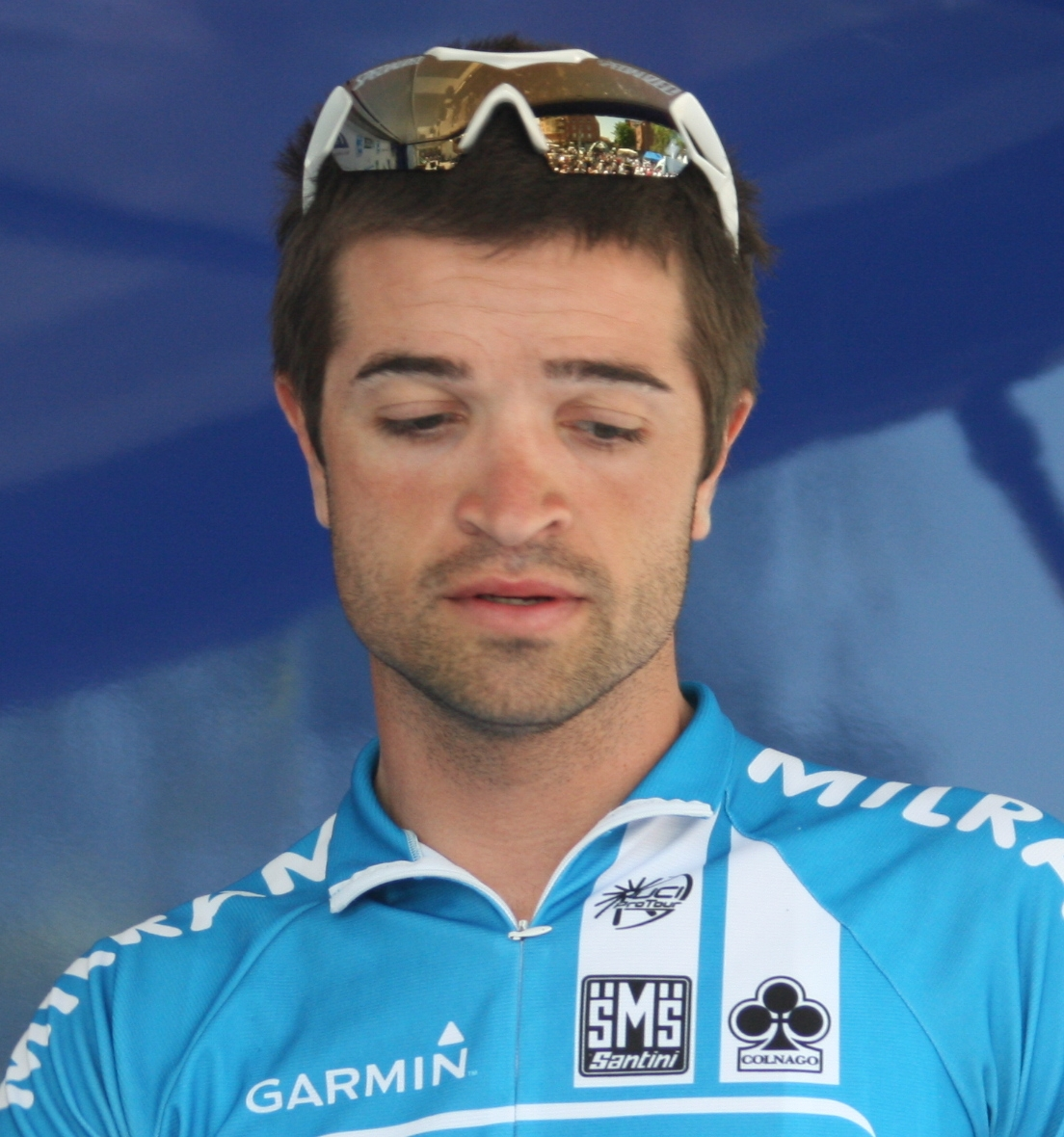

Personal information
- Full name: Elia Rigotto
- Born: 4 March 1982 (age 44) Vicenza, Italy

Cycling career
- Sport: Cycling
- Discipline: Road
- Role: Rider

Professional teams
- 2005: Domina Vacanze
- 2006–2008: Team Milram
- 2009: Diquigiovanni–Androni

Elia Rigotto (born 4 March 1982 in Vicenza) is an Italian former professional road bicycle racer. During his career, he rode with Domina Vacanze, Team Milram and Serramenti PVC Diquigiovanni–Androni Giocattoli.

In 2008, he was disqualified from the Tour Down Under race, when a race for the finish line left an opponent seriously injured.

Later that year, he became the first Italian to win the Schaal J.C. Sels Merksem race in Antwerp.

== Major results ==
2003
1st Stage 5 Vuelta a la Comunidad de Madrid
2004
1st Trofeo Zsšdi
1st Grand Prix Joseph Bruyère
1st Menton-Savona
1st Prologue, Stages 4 & 6 Giro delle Regioni
2nd Trofeo Alcide Degasperi
2nd Coppa San Geo
3rd Ronde van Vlaanderen U23
4th GP Palio del Recioto
10th Gran Premio della Liberazione
10th Trofeo Banca Popolare di Vicenza
2006
1st Stage 6 Tour Méditerranéen
5th GP du canton d'Argovie
9th Rund um die Hainleite
2007
5th Dutch Food Valley Classic
2008
1st Schaal Sels-Merksem
4th Tour de Rijke
5th Ronde van het Groene Hart
6th Memorial Rik Van Steenbergen
