= James Vanlandschoot =

Belgian bicycle racer

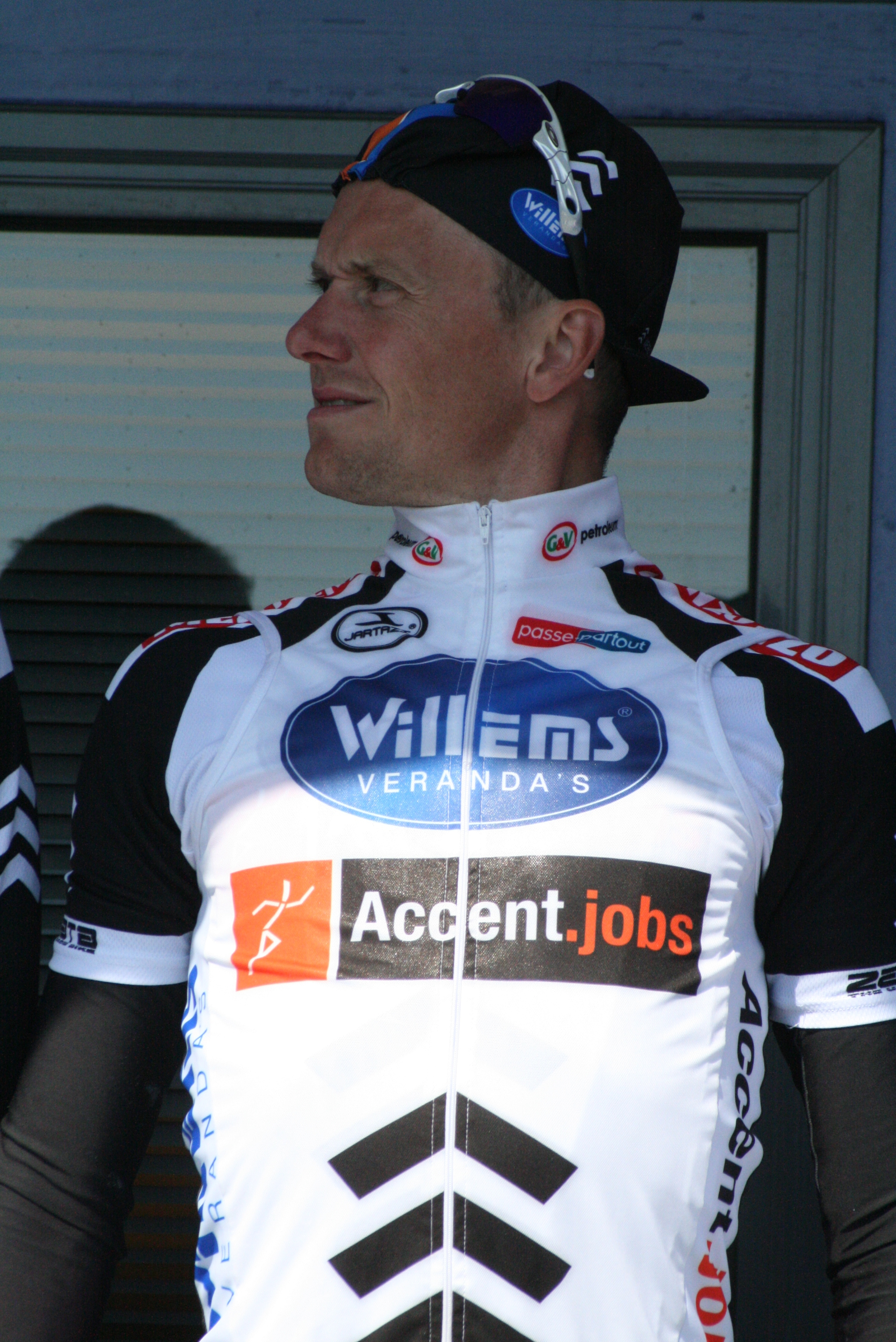
- Vanlandschoot in 2011

Personal information
- Full name: James Vanlandschoot
- Born: 26 August 1978 (age 48) Bruges, Belgium
- Height: 1.66 m (5 ft 5 in)
- Weight: 67 kg (148 lb; 10.6 st)

Cycling career
- Sport: Cycling
- Current team: Retired
- Discipline: Road
- Role: Rider

Professional teams
- 2001–2003: Vlaanderen–T Interim
- 2004: Relax–Bodysol
- 2005–2007: Landbouwkrediet–Colnago
- 2008: Mitsubishi–Jartazi
- 2009–2015: Verandas Willems

James Vanlandschoot (born 26 August 1978 in Bruges) is a Belgian former professional cyclist, who rode professionally between 2001 and 2015.

== Major results ==
1999
7th Ronde van Vlaanderen U23
2000
1st Overall Tweedaagse van Gaverstreek

1st Stage 1

1st Stage 3 Le Triptyque des Monts et Châteaux
2001
10th Omloop van de Vlaamse Scheldeboorden
2002
3rd Grand Prix Rudy Dhaenens
6th Overall Circuit Franco-Belge
9th Vlaamse Havenpijl
10th Brussel–Ingooigem
2003
2nd Scandinavian Open Road Race
4th Omloop van de Vlaamse Scheldeboorden
8th Omloop van het Waasland
9th Vlaamse Havenpijl
10th Overall Tour of Qatar
2004
Vuelta a Mallorca

5th Trofeo Alcúdia
6th Trofeo Manacor

5th Nokere Koerse
7th Le Samyn
2005
7th Omloop van het Waasland
2006
7th Kampioenschap van Vlaanderen
9th Classic Haribo
2007
6th GP Briek Schotte
8th Nokere Koerse
9th Grote Prijs Stad Zottegem
2008
3rd Grand Prix Pino Cerami
7th Overall La Tropicale Amissa Bongo
2009
3rd Nationale Sluitingsprijs
7th Grote Prijs Stad Zottegem
8th Profronde van Fryslan
10th Scheldeprijs
2010
5th Ronde van Overijssel
8th Omloop der Kempen
9th Schaal Sels
2011
6th Cholet-Pays de Loire
9th Dutch Food Valley Classic
9th Grand Prix Pino Cerami
2013
5th Omloop van het Waasland
6th Grand Prix Pino Cerami
10th De Kustpijl
2015
8th Omloop van het Waasland
