= Sven Krauß =

German cyclist (born 1983)

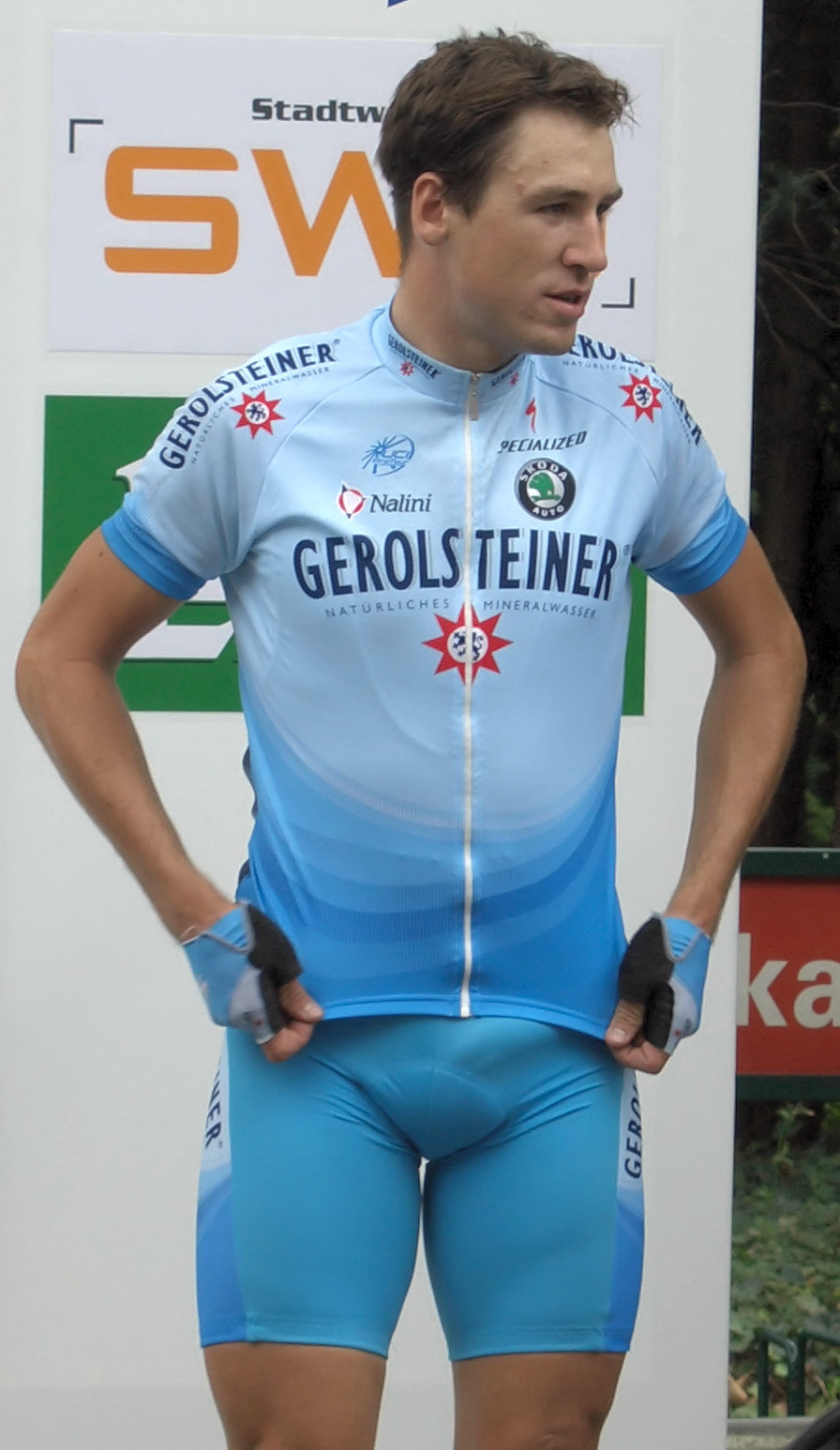

Personal information
- Full name: Sven Krauß
- Born: 6 January 1983 (age 43) Herrenberg, West Germany
- Height: 1.88 m (6 ft 2 in)
- Weight: 81 kg (179 lb)

Cycling career
- Sport: Cycling
- Current team: retired
- Discipline: Road
- Role: Rider

Professional team
- 2004–2008: Gerolsteiner

Sven Krauß (born 6 January 1983) is a retired German professional road bicycle racer, who last rode for Team Gerolsteiner in 2008.

== Tour de France 2008 ==
During stage 13 of the Tour de France on Krauß hit a traffic island in the fast final 10 km of the stage causing him to crash heavily with sufficient force to shatter the frame of the bike. He recovered sufficiently well to complete the stage in last position on a spare bike. The incident was caught on film and posted to numerous video sharing websites.

In 2013, Krauß became manager of the Continental team Bergstraße-Jenatec.

== Major results ==
- Oberösterreich-Rundfahrt - 1 stage (2010)
- Rund um Düren (2010)
- Cinturón a Mallorca - 1 stage (2010)
- Regio-Tour - 1 stage (2005)
- Thüringen Rundfahrt - 1 stage (2003)
- 2nd, National Team Pursuit Championship (2003)
- Ster Elektrotoer - 1 stage (2002)
- (bronze) World U19 Pursuit Championship (2001)
- Germany U17 Road Race Champion (1999)
  - 2nd (1998)
