= 2005 Milan–San Remo =

Race details
- Dates: 19 March 2005
- Stages: 1
- Distance: 294 km (183 mi)

Results
	Winner	Alessandro Petacchi (ITA)	(Fassa Bortolo)
	Second	Danilo Hondo (GER)	(Gerolsteiner)
	Third	Thor Hushovd (NOR)	(Crédit Agricole)

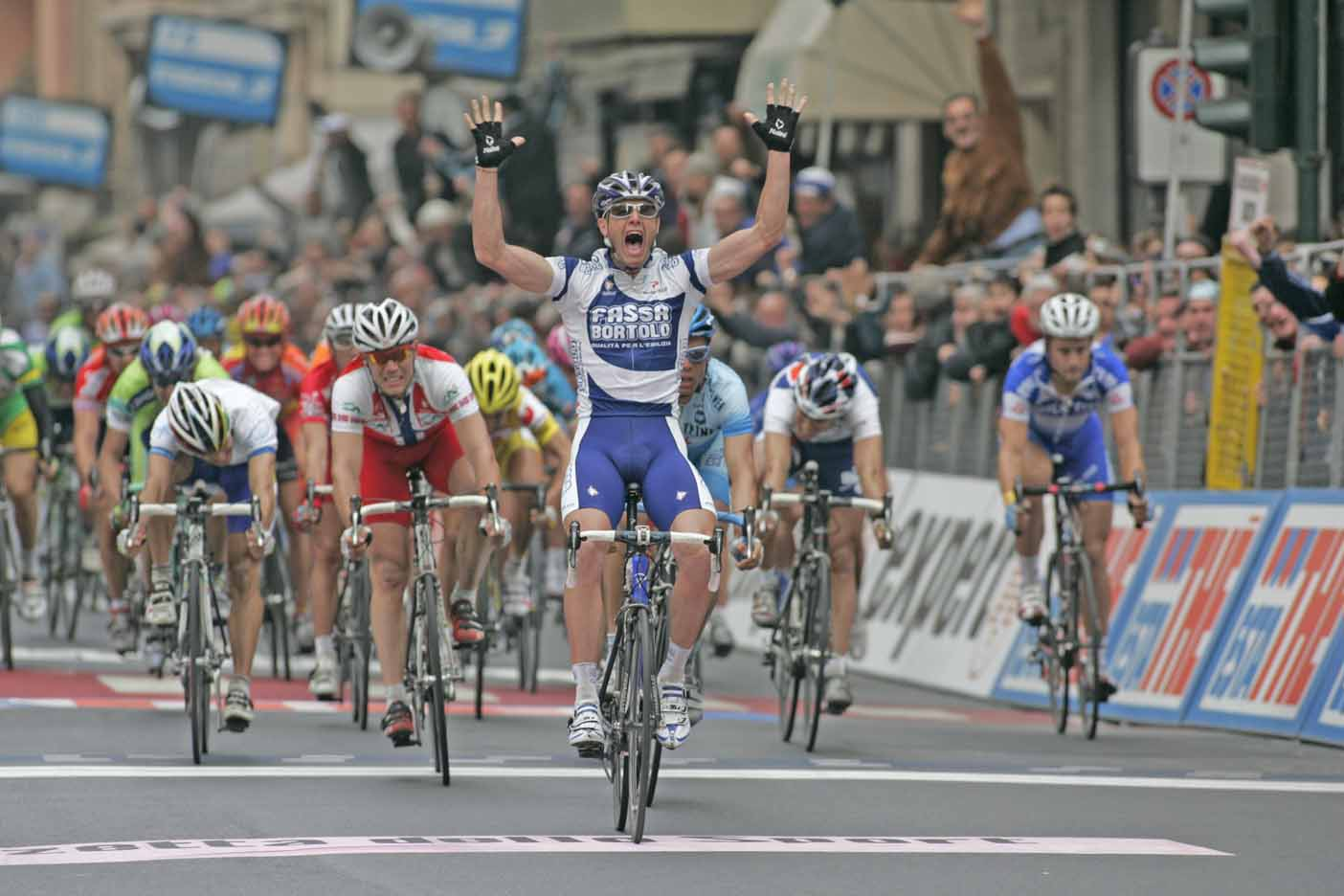
Italian sprinter Alessandro Petacchi winning the 2005 Milan–San Remo

The 2005 Milan–San Remo was the 96th edition of the monument cycling classic race Milan–San Remo. It was held on 19 March 2005 and saw the first win of Italian rider Alessandro Petacchi in the Via Roma in a bunch sprint.

== General standings ==
	Cyclist	Team	Time
1	Alessandro Petacchi (ITA)	Fassa Bortolo	7h 11'39"
2	Danilo Hondo (GER)	Gerolsteiner	s.t.
3	Thor Hushovd (NOR)	Crédit Agricole	s.t.
4	Stuart O'Grady (AUS)	Cofidis	s.t.
5	Óscar Freire (ESP)	Rabobank	s.t.
6	Philippe Gilbert (BEL)	Française des Jeux	s.t.
7	Ruggero Marzoli (ITA)	Acqua & Sapone–Adria Mobil	s.t.
8	Tom Boonen (BEL)	Quick-Step–Innergetic	s.t.
9	Franco Pellizotti (ITA)	Liquigas–Bianchi	s.t.
10	Manuele Mori (ITA)	Saunier Duval–Prodir	s.t.

- Danilo Hondo was later disqualified for failing to pass a doping test.
