= Team Milram =

German cycling team (2006–2010)

Team information
- UCI code: MRM
- Registered: Italy (2006–2007); Germany (2008–2010)
- Founded: 2006
- Disbanded: 2010
- Discipline: Road
- Status: ProTour
- Bicycles: Focus Bikes

Key personnel
- General manager: Gerry van Gerwen

Team name history
- 2006–2010: Team Milram
Team Milram jersey
Jersey

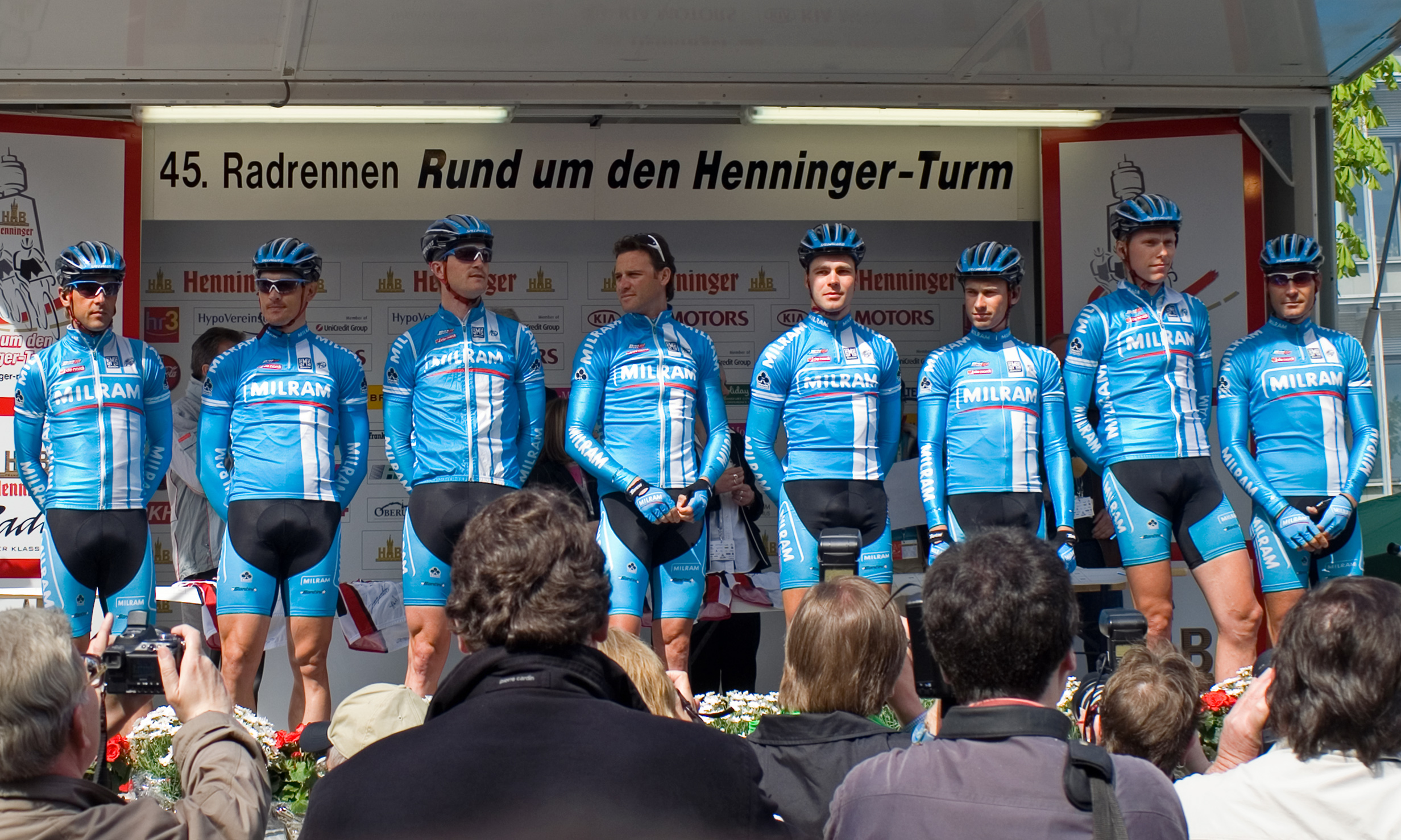
Rund um den Henninger-Turm (2006) 4. left: Alessandro Petacchi, right: Erik Zabel

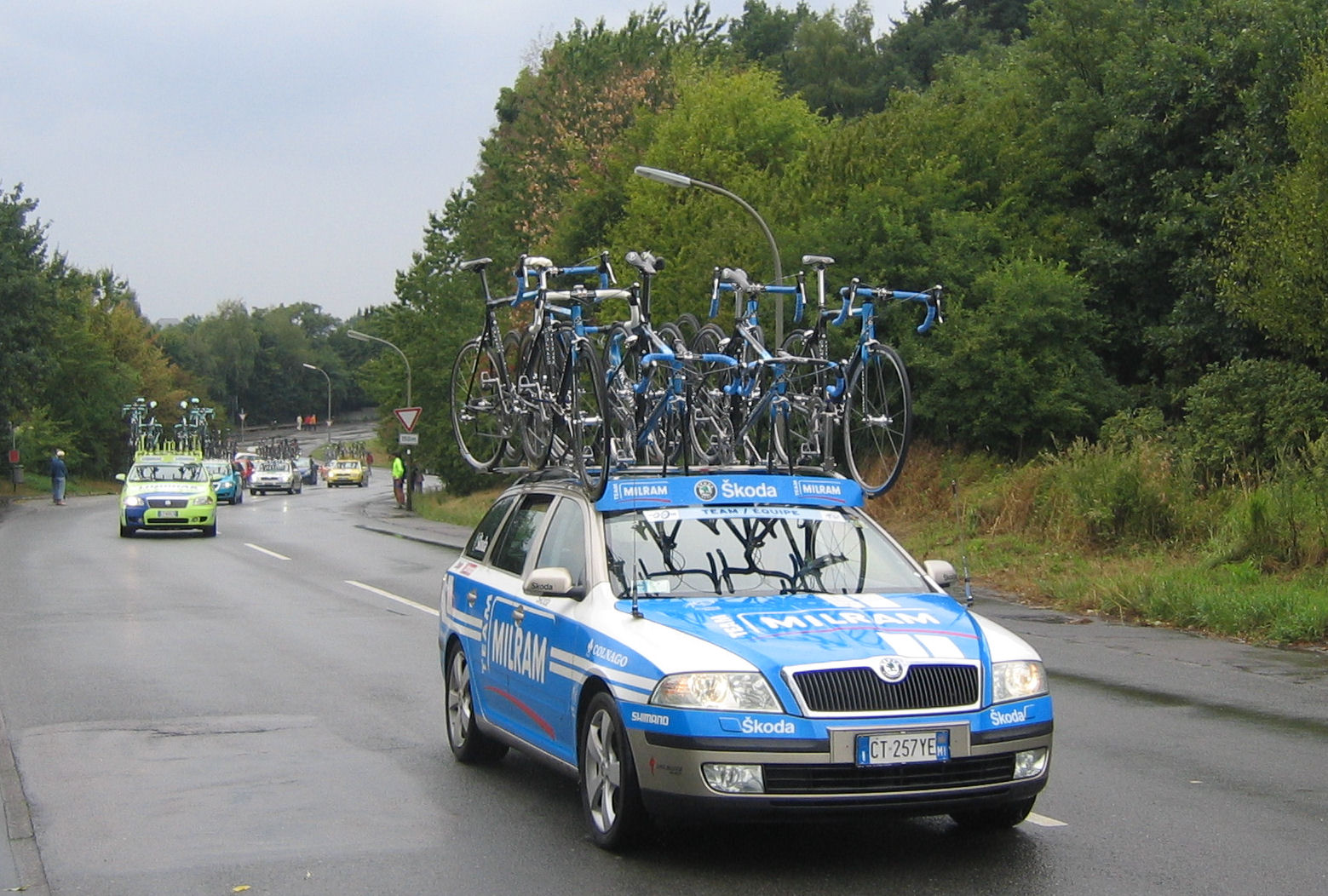
Team car Team Milram Deutschlandtour 2006

Team Milram (UCI team code: MRM) was a German (formerly Italian) pro cycling team, participating at the UCI ProTour.

== History ==
The pro cycling team was founded in the beginning of 2006, taking over the UCI ProTeam license of Team Domina Vacanze and merging with Team Wiesenhof. The main sponsor is the Milram brand of the Bremen based Nordmilch dairy company. Some smaller sponsors include Motorex, an oil company based in Switzerland. Sprinters Alessandro Petacchi and Erik Zabel initially were the top riders and captains. The squad is completed by 25 mainly German riders.

Among Team Milram's most important successes in 2006 and 2007 Christian Knees's win at the German classic race „Rund um Köln", Alessandro Petacchi winning the Niedersachsen-Rundfahrt in 2006 and 2007, Erik Zabel's title as vice World Champion 2006, his win of the best sprinter's jersey at the Deutschland Tour 2006 and 2007 his three-stage wins at the Vuelta a España. Further important ranks are Alessandro Petacchi's five stage wins at the Giro d'Italia 2007, his win at the classic race Paris–Tours and Niki Terpstra's win of the best climber's jersey at the Deutschland Tour 2007.

Since 2008, Team Milram is a German team. The general manager is Gerry van Gerwen. His operating company VeloCity GmbH, which was founded in 2007, took over the previous Italian operating company Ciclosport with all components including the ProTour license for the beginning of the 2008 season. The new team basis is Dortmund's Club Olympia. With a new organisation structure, a much younger squad, clear objectives and an enhanced anti-doping-programme the team has changed extensively.

In 2009 and 2010, the team was sponsored by Focus Bikes. After a lengthy search for a title sponsor to replace the outgoing Nordmilch dairy company proved fruitless, the team was forced to disband effective at the end of the 2010 season. Van Gerweren hoped to form a new team for 2012.

== Petacchi 's doping case ==
At 23 May 2007, during the 2007 Giro d'Italia, Alessandro Petacchi was found guilty of using salbutamol after a doping control. Petacchi had a certificate to use salbutamol in the treatment of asthma, but his level of salbutamol was extremely high. Petacchi was placed on non-active status and missed the 2007 Tour de France. In July 2007, Italian Cycling Federation (FCI) ruled that Petacchi gave good reasons for this high level. Petacchi was then absolved by the FCI when they deemed any overuse of Salbutamol as simple human error. The Italian National Olympic Committee (CONI) argued that Petacchi should be suspended for the high level of salbutamol, and send the case to the International Court of Arbitration for Sport (CAS) in Lausanne, the sporting world's highest court.

On May 6, 2008, the Court of Arbitration for Sport banned Petacchi until the end of August, applied retroactively from last November. CAS also announced that all competitive results obtained during the 2007 Giro d'Italia shall be disqualified with all of the resulting consequences including forfeiture of any medals, points and prizes. Results obtained after 31 October 2007 and during the period of ineligibility will be disqualified.

As a result of this, on May 16, 2008, Petacchi was fired by Team Milram.

== Major wins ==
2006
Gran Premio della Costa Etruschi, Alessandro Petacchi
Stage 6 Tour Méditerranéen, Elia Rigotto
Stage 3 & 4 Vuelta a Andalucía, Alessandro Petacchi
Stage 2 & 3 Vuelta a la Comunitat Valenciana, Alessandro Petacchi
Giro della Provincia di Lucca, Alessandro Petacchi
Stage 7 Tirreno–Adriatico, Alessandro Petacchi
Rund um Köln, Christian Knees
Overall Niedersachsen-Rundfahrt, Alessandro Petacchi

Stage 1, 2, 3, 4 & 5, Alessandro Petacchi

Stage 1 Bayern Rundfahrt, Erik Zabel
Stage 3 Bayern Rundfahrt, Ralf Grabsch
Stage 5 Bayern Rundfahrt, Björn Schröder
Stage 4 & 21 Vuelta a España, Erik Zabel
Coppa Sabatini, Giovanni Visconti
2nd Milan–San Remo, Alessandro Petacchi
2nd Vattenfall Cyclassics, Erik Zabel
3rd Gent–Wevelgem, Alessandro Petacchi

2007
Gran Premio della Costa Etruschi, Alessandro Petacchi
Stage 6 Tour Méditerranéen, Mirco Lorenzetto
Overall Volta ao Algarve

Stage 3, 4 & 5, Alessandro Petacchi

Stage 2 Vuelta a la Comunitat Valenciana, Alessandro Petacchi
Overall Niedersachsen-Rundfahrt, Alessandro Petacchi

Stage 1, 2 & 4, Alessandro Petacchi

Stage 2 & 3 Bayern Rundfahrt, Erik Zabel
Stage 5 Bayern Rundfahrt, Sebastian Siedler
Stage 1 Tour de Suisse, Erik Zabel
Stage 3 Deutschland Tour, Erik Zabel
Stage 1 Regio Tour, Alessandro Petacchi
Stage 7 Vuelta a España, Erik Zabel
Stage 11 & 12 Vuelta a España, Alessandro Petacchi
Paris–Tours, Alessandro Petacchi

2008
Stage 2 Vuelta a la Comunitat Valenciana, Erik Zabel
Overall Bayern Rundfahrt, Christian Knees
Overall Regio Tour, Björn Schröder
Prologue Deutschland Tour, Brett Lancaster
Schaal Sels, Elia Rigotto
Firenze–Pistoia, Andriy Hrivko

2009
Trofeo Calvià, Gerald Ciolek
Stage 7 Presidential Cycling Tour of Turkey, Robert Förster
Eschborn–Frankfurt City Loop, Fabian Wegmann
Overall Bayern Rundfahrt, Linus Gerdemann
Grand Prix of Aargau Canton, Peter Velits
Stage 3 Critérium du Dauphiné Libéré, Niki Terpstra
Stage 1 Ster Elektrotoer, Niki Terpstra
Stage 2 Vuelta a España, Gerald Ciolek
2nd Vattenfall Cyclassics, Gerald Ciolek

2010
Trofeo Inca, Linus Gerdemann
Stage 3 Vuelta a Murcia, Luke Roberts
Stage 1 Tirreno–Adriatico, Linus Gerdemann
Stage 1 Volta a Catalunya, Paul Voss
Rund um den Finanzplatz, Fabian Wegmann
Batavus Prorace, Markus Eichler
Neuseen Classics, Roger Kluge
Stage 3 Bayern Rundfahrt, Gerald Ciolek
Sparkassen Giro, Niki Terpstra

=== Notes ===
1. All competitive results obtained for Allessandro Petacchi during the 2007 Giro d'Italia or between 31 October 2007 and September 1, 2008, are disqualified.

== National, continental, world and Olympic champions ==
2006
Kazakhstan Time Trial Championship, Maxim Iglinsky
Slovakia Time Trial Championship, Matej Jurčo
Ukraine Time Trial Championship, Andriy Hrivko

2007
Ukraine Time Trial Championship, Volodymyr Dyudya

2008
Ukraine Time Trial Championship, Andriy Hrivko
Slovakia Time Trial Championship, Matej Jurčo
Slovakia Road Race Championship, Matej Jurčo

2010
Germany Road Race Championship, Christian Knees
Netherlands Road Race Championship, Niki Terpstra

== Team roster ==
As of 1 January 2010.

Rider	Date of birth
Gerald Ciolek (GER)	September 19, 1986 (aged 23)
Wim De Vocht (BEL)	April 29, 1982 (aged 27)
Markus Eichler (GER)	February 18, 1982 (aged 27)
Robert Förster (GER)	January 27, 1978 (aged 31)
Markus Fothen (GER)	September 9, 1981 (aged 28)
Thomas Fothen (GER)	April 16, 1983 (aged 26)
Johannes Fröhlinger (GER)	June 9, 1985 (aged 24)
Artur Gajek (GER)	April 18, 1985 (aged 24)
Linus Gerdemann (GER)	September 16, 1982 (aged 27)
Roger Kluge (GER)	February 5, 1986 (aged 23)
Servais Knaven (NED)	March 6, 1971 (aged 38)
Christian Knees (GER)	March 5, 1981 (aged 28)

Rider	Date of birth
Dominik Nerz (GER)	August 25, 1989 (aged 20)
Luke Roberts (AUS)	January 25, 1977 (aged 32)
Dominik Roels (GER)	January 21, 1987 (aged 22)
Thomas Rohregger (AUT)	December 23, 1982 (aged 27)
Matthias Russ (GER)	November 14, 1983 (aged 26)
Björn Schröder (GER)	October 27, 1980 (aged 29)
Roy Sentjens (BEL)	December 15, 1980 (aged 29)
Wim Stroetinga (NED)	May 23, 1985 (aged 24)
Niki Terpstra (NED)	May 18, 1984 (aged 25)
Paul Voss (GER)	March 26, 1986 (aged 23)
Fabian Wegmann (GER)	June 20, 1980 (aged 29)
Peter Wrolich (AUT)	May 20, 1974 (aged 35)

== See also ==
- List of teams and cyclists in the 2008 Tour de France
- 2008 Tour de France
- Tour de France
