= De Nardi =

Cycling team

Team information
- UCI code: SDM
- Registered: Slovakia (1999–2002); Italy (2003–2005)
- Founded: 1999
- Disbanded: 2005
- Discipline: Road

Team name history
- 1999–2002 2003 2004 2005: De Nardi–Pasta Montegrappa; De Nardi–Colpack; De Nardi–Piemme Telekom; Domina Vacanze

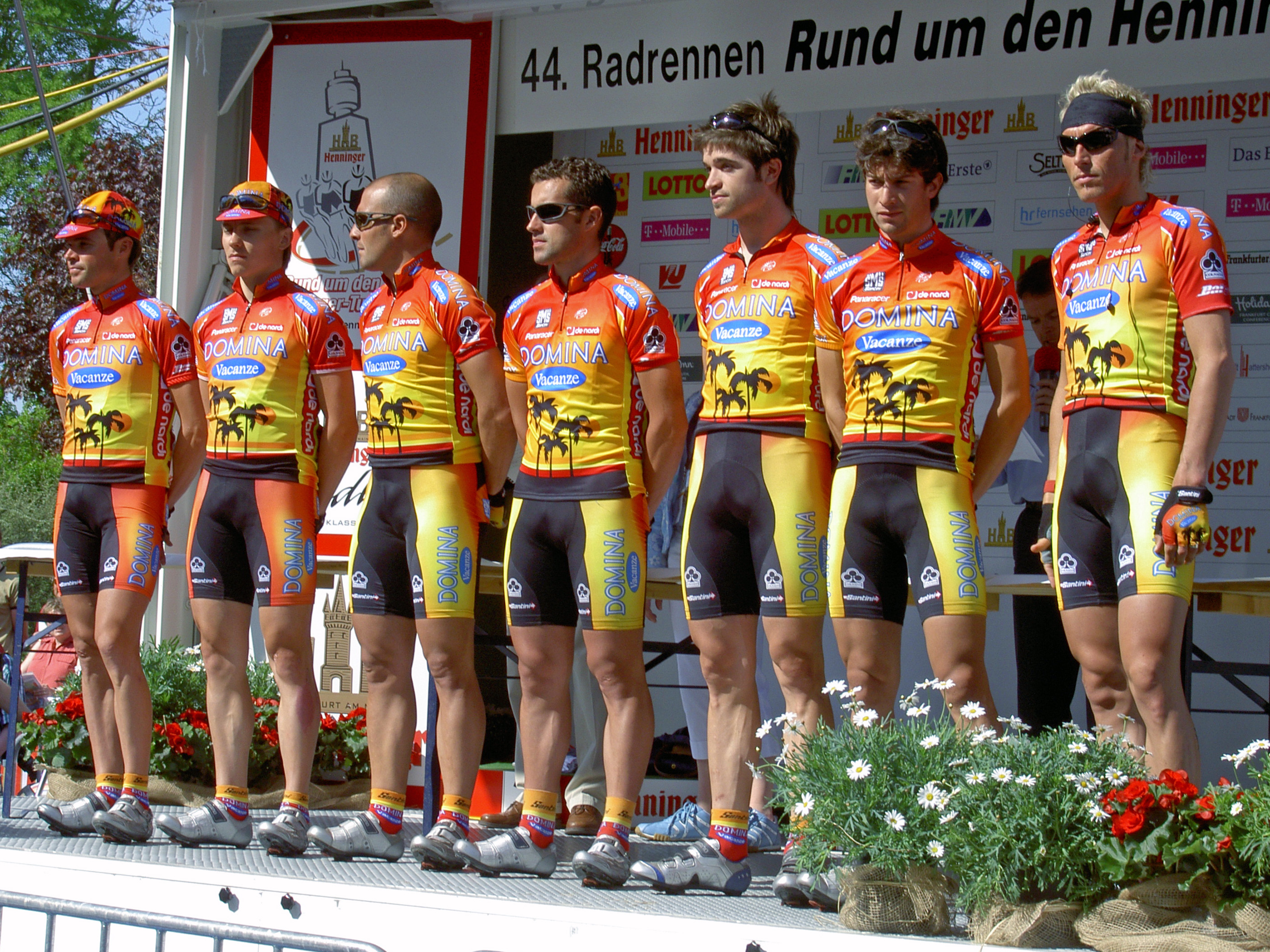
Part of the Domina Vacanze cycling team outside of the Henninger Turm in Germany

De Nardi was a professional cycling team based in Italy. Founded under a Slovak license, they helped nurture talented young riders. In 2003, the merged with Team Colpack-Astro, and took on Colpack as a co-sponsor. In 2005, Italian hotel group Domina Vacanze sponsored the team, having formerly sponsored a different team. For the 2005 season the team competed in the 2005 UCI ProTour. However, they didn't have the budget of the other teams and produced very few wins. For the 2006 season, the team merged with Team Wiesenhof to create Team Milram. In 2009 an amateur team sponsored by De Nardi and Colpack emerged, now known as Team Colpack.

== Notable riders ==
Wladimir Belli (ITA) 2005
Alessandro Bertolini (ITA) 2005
Ruggero Borghi (ITA) 2004–2005
Simone Cadamuro (ITA) 2003–2005
Matteo Carrara (ITA) 2003
Mirko Celestino (ITA) 2005
Alessandro Cortinovis (ITA) 2005
Marco Fertonani (ITA) 2005
Angelo Furlan (ITA) 2005
Sergio Ghisalberti (ITA) 2005
Mirco Lorenzetto (ITA) 2004–2005
Giuseppe Palumbo (ITA) 2003
Ivan Quaranta (ITA) 2005
Elia Rigotto (ITA) 2005
Luca Solari (ITA) 2005
Alessandro Vanotti (ITA) 2004–2005
Giovanni Visconti (ITA) 2005
Ruslan Ivanov (MDA) 2005
Igor Pugaci (MDA) 2004
Andriy Hrivko (UKR) 2005
Serhiy Honchar (UKR) 2003–2005
Andrus Aug (EST) 2003
Charly Wegelius (GBR) 2003–2004
Maxim Iglinskiy (KAZ) 2005
Matej Jurčo (SVK) 2004–2005
Rafael Nuritdinov (UZB) 2003–2005

== Major wins ==
2003
Stage 2 Giro della Liguria, Giuseppe Palumbo
Stage 4 Giro del Trentino, Michele Gobbi
Stage 21 Giro d'Italia, Serhiy Honchar
Stage 5 Tour of Austria, Matteo Carrara
Gran Premio Industria e Commercio Artigianato Carnaghese, Michele Gobbi
Ukraine Road Race Championships, Serhiy Honchar
Criterium d'Abruzzo, Matteo Carrara
Trofeo Città di Castelfidardo, Michele Gobbi
Stage 5 Tour of Qinghai Lake, Matteo Carrara
Stage 1 Tour de Pologne, Simone Cadamuro

2004
Doha GP, Simone Cadamuro
Stage 1a Settimana Internazionale di Coppi e Bartali, Graziano Gasparre
Veenendaal–Veenendaal, Simone Cadamuro
Stage 13 Giro d'Italia, Serhiy Honchar
Slovakia Time Trial Championships, Matej Jurčo
Uzbekistan Road Race Championships, Rafael Nuritdinov
Stage 3 Tour of Qinghai Lake, Simone Cadamuro
Giro del Friuli, Michele Gobbi

2005
Stage 3 Giro del Trentino, Serhiy Honchar
Slovakia Time Trial Championships, Matej Jurčo
Ukraine Time Trial Championships, Andriy Hrivko
Gran Premio Città di Camaiore, Maxim Iglinskiy
Stage 2 Eneco Tour, Simone Cadamuro
Coppa Ugo Agostoni, Paolo Valoti
Stage 6 Deutschland Tour, Maxim Iglinskiy
Coppa Placci, Paolo Valoti
Coppa Sabatini, Alessandro Bertolini

== National champions ==
2003
Ukrainian Road Race Championships, Serhiy Honchar
2004
Slovak Time Trial Championships, Matej Jurčo
Uzbekistan Road Race Championships, Rafael Nuritdinov
2005
Slovak Time Trial Championships, Matej Jurčo
Ukrainian Time Trial Championships, Andriy Hrivko
