= List of wins by Bonjour and its successors =

This is a comprehensive list of victories of the Team TotalEnergies cycling team. The races are categorized according to the UCI Continental Circuits rules.

== 2000 – Bonjour ==
Stage 3 Tour de Langkawi, Damien Nazon
Stage 5 Paris–Nice, François Simon
Paris–Camembert, Didier Rous
Stage 4 Circuit des Mines, Sébastien Joly
Overall GP du Midi Libre, Didier Rous

Stage 1, Damien Nazon

Grand Prix de Villers-Cotterêts, Damien Nazon
Mi-Août 3, Jean-Cyril Robin
Stage 3 Tour de l'Ain, Frédéric Gabriel
GP Le Télégramme, Walter Bénéteau
Stage 1 Tour du Poitou-Charentes, Damien Nazon
Stage 3 Tour de l'Avenir, Fabrice Salanson
Stage 1 Circuit Franco-Belge, Sylvain Chavanel

== 2001 – Bonjour ==
Stages 3 & 4 Étoile de Bessèges, Damien Nazon
Tour de Vendée, Didier Rous
Trophée des Grimpeurs, Didier Rous
Overall Four Days of Dunkirk, Didier Rous

Stages 5 & 6a, Didier Rous

Prologue Dauphiné Libéré, Didier Rous
France Road Race Championships, Didier Rous
Overall Tour du Limousin, Franck Bouyer

Stage 1, Franck Bouyer

Tour du Finistère, Franck Rénier

== 2002 – Bonjour ==
Stage 2 Tour of Qatar, Damien Nazon
Grand Prix de la Ville de Lillers, Pascal Deramé
Overall Tour de Normandie, Jérôme Pineau
Overall Circuit de la Sarthe, Didier Rous
Tour de Vendée, Franck Bouyer
Trophée des Grimpeurs, Sylvain Chavanel
Overall Four Days of Dunkirk, Sylvain Chavanel
Stage 2 GP du Midi Libre, Fabrice Salanson
Stage 2a Tour of Belgium, Damien Nazon
Stage 1 Route du Sud, Damien Nazon
Stage 1 Tour de l'Ain, Damien Nazon
Stage 3 Tour du Poitou-Charentes, Damien Nazon

== 2003 – Brioches La Boulangère ==
Stage 2 Tour of Qatar, Damien Nazon
Stage 2 Tour Méditerranéen, Emmanuel Magnien
Tour du Haut Var, Sylvain Chavanel
Critérium des Espoirs, Anthony Geslin
Grand Prix de la Ville de Lillers, Damien Nazon
Classic Loire Atlantique, Thomas Voeckler
Grand Prix Rudy Dhaenens, Christophe Kern
Stage 1 Critérium International, Damien Nazon
Stage 3b Circuit de la Sarthe, Sylvain Chavanel
Trophée des Grimpeurs, Didier Rous
Overall Tour de Luxembourg, Thomas Voeckler

Stages 1 & 3a, Thomas Voeckler

France Road Race Championships, Didier Rous
Polynormande, Jérôme Pineau
Stage 1 Tour de l'Ain, Jérôme Pineau
Stage 2 Tour de l'Ain, Maryan Hary
Stage 1 Tour du Limousin, Didier Rous
Boucles de l'Aulne, Walter Bénéteau
Stages 2 & 3 Tour de l'Avenir, Sébastien Chavanel
Stage 8 Tour de l'Avenir, Thomas Voeckler
Stage 2b Tour de la Somme, Jimmy Engoulvent

== 2004 – Brioches La Boulangère ==
Clásica de Almería, Jérôme Pineau
Route Adélie de Vitré, Anthony Geslin
Stage 1 Circuit de la Sarthe, Franck Bouyer
Paris–Camembert, Franck Bouyer
Overall Four Days of Dunkirk, Sylvain Chavanel

Stage 3, Didier Rous

Overall Tour of Belgium, Sylvain Chavanel
A Travers le Morbihan, Thomas Voeckler
Stage 4 Route du Sud, Thomas Voeckler
France Road Race Championships, Thomas Voeckler
Tour du Doubs, Mathieu Sprick
Stage 5 Tour de Wallonie, Sébastien Chavanel
Polynormande, Sylvain Chavanel
Overall Tour de l'Ain, Jérôme Pineau

Stage 1, Jérôme Pineau

Stage 3 Tour du Limousin, Didier Rous
Stage 3 & 4 Tour du Poitou Charentes, Sylvain Chavanel
GP Ouest-France, Didier Rous
Stage 1 Hessen-Rundfahrt, Unai Yus
Stages 2, 4 & 5 Tour de l'Avenir, Sébastien Chavanel
Stage 6 Tour de l'Avenir, Christophe Kern
Paris–Bourges, Jérôme Pineau

== 2005 – Bouygues Télécom ==
GP Cholet, Pierrick Fédrigo
Paris–Camembert, Laurent Brochard
Stage 1 Circuit de la Sarthe, Anthony Ravard
Stage 3 Circuit de Lorraine, Anthony Geslin
Overall Four Days of Dunkirk, Pierrick Fédrigo

Stage 3, Thomas Voeckler

Stage 6 Volta a Catalunya, Anthony Charteau
Stage 3 Route du Sud, Didier Rous
France Road Race Championships, Pierrick Fédrigo
3rd (bronze) Road World Championships, Anthony Geslin

== 2006 – Bouygues Télécom ==
Stage 3 GP Costa Azul, Sébastien Chavanel
Stage 5 Tour of the Basque Country, Thomas Voeckler
Paris–Camembert, Anthony Geslin
Trophée des Grimpeurs, Didier Rous
Stage 4 Four Days of Dunkirk, Pierrick Fédrigo
Stage 1 Tour de Picardie, Rony Martias
Overall Route du Sud, Thomas Voeckler

Stage 1, Thomas Voeckler

Netherlands, Time Trial Championships, Stef Clement
Tour du Doubs, Yoann Le Boulanger
Stage 14 Tour de France, Pierrick Fédrigo
Overall Paris–Corrèze, Didier Rous

Stage 1, Didier Rous

Clásica de San Sebastián, Xavier Florencio
Stage 1 Tour du Limousin, Pierrick Fédrigo
Stage 9 Tour de l'Avenir, Stef Clement
Paris–Bourges, Thomas Voeckler
3rd Overall Four Days of Dunkirk, Didier Rous
3rd Stage 10 Vuelta a España, Xavier Florencio

== 2007 – Bouygues Télécom ==
Tro-Bro Léon, Saïd Haddou
Trophée des Grimpeurs, Anthony Geslin
Stage 2 Tour de Luxembourg, Laurent Brochard
Tour du Doubs, Vincent Jérôme
Estonia Road Race Championship, Erki Pütsep
Netherlands Time Trial Championship, Stef Clement
Tour du Limousin, Pierrick Fédrigo
Overall Tour du Poitou Charentes, Thomas Voeckler
GP Ouest-France, Thomas Voeckler
Stage 1 Circuit Franco-Belge, Aurélien Clerc
3rd, World Championships, Time Trial, Stef Clement

== 2008 – Bouygues Télécom ==
Stage 1 & 4 La Tropicale Amissa Bongo, Rony Martias
Overall Étoile de Bessèges, Yury Trofimov

Stage 3, Yury Trofimov

Stage 1 Tour de Langkawi, Mathieu Sprick
Stage 1 Driedaagse van West-Vlaanderen, Aurélien Clerc
Overall Tour Ivoirien de la Paix, Rony Martias

Stage 1, Sébastien Turgot

Overall Circuit de la Sarthe, Thomas Voeckler
Stage 4 Four Days of Dunkirk, Pierrick Fédrigo
Stage 4 Volta a Catalunya, Pierrick Fédrigo
Grand Prix de Plumelec-Morbihan, Thomas Voeckler
Stage 5 Critérium du Dauphiné Libéré, Yury Trofimov
Tour du Doubs, Anthony Geslin
GP Ouest-France, Pierrick Fédrigo
Chrono des Nations, Stef Clement
2nd Gent–Wevelgem, Aurélien Clerc
3rd Paris–Tours, Sébastien Turgot

== 2009 – Bbox Bouygues Telecom ==
Stage 2 La Tropicale Amissa Bongo, Evgeny Sokolov
Stage 4 La Tropicale Amissa Bongo, Johann Tschopp
Overall Étoile de Bessèges, Thomas Voeckler
Stage 7 Tour de Langkawi, Yohann Gène
Overall Tour du Haut Var, Thomas Voeckler

Stage 2, Thomas Voeckler

Stage 2 Tour of the Basque Country, Yury Trofimov
Tro-Bro Léon, Saïd Haddou
Trophée des Grimpeurs, Thomas Voeckler
Stage 5 Four Days of Dunkirk, Pierrick Fédrigo
Stage 6 Critérium du Dauphiné Libéré, Pierrick Fédrigo
Stage 5 Tour de France, Thomas Voeckler
Stage 9 Tour de France, Pierrick Fédrigo

== 2010 – Bbox Bouygues Telecom ==
Overall La Tropicale Amissa Bongo, Anthony Charteau

Stage 4, Anthony Charteau
Stage 5, Yohann Gène

Stage 2 Paris–Nice, William Bonnet
Overall Critérium International, Pierrick Fédrigo

Stage 1, Pierrick Fédrigo

Stage 1 Three Days of De Panne, Steve Chainel
Stage 2 Three Days of De Panne, Sébastien Turgot
Route Adélie de Vitré, Cyril Gautier
Overall Tour de Bretagne, Franck Bouyer
Stage 4 Circuit de Lorraine, Pierre Rolland
Stage 20 Giro d'Italia, Johann Tschopp
Stage 4 Critérium du Dauphiné, Nicolas Vogondy
France Road Race Championships, Thomas Voeckler
France Time Trial Championships, Nicolas Vogondy
Stage 15 Tour de France, Thomas Voeckler
Stage 16 Tour de France, Pierrick Fédrigo
Mountains classification in the Tour de France, Anthony Charteau
GP de Québec, Thomas Voeckler

== 2011 – Team Europcar ==
Overall La Tropicale Amissa Bongo, Anthony Charteau

Stages 2 & 5, Yohann Gène

Stage Étoile de Bessèges, Said Haddou
Stage 1 Tour Méditerranéen, Thomas Voeckler
Overall Tour du Haut Var, Thomas Voeckler
Stage 3 Tour of South Africa, Yohann Gène
Stages 4 & 8 Paris–Nice, Thomas Voeckler
GP Cholet, Thomas Voeckler
La Roue Tourangelle, David Veilleux
Tro-Bro Léon, Vincent Jérôme
Stage 2 Giro del Trentino, Thomas Voeckler
Overall Four Days of Dunkirk, Thomas Voeckler

Stage 4, Thomas Voeckler

Stage 2 Circuit de Lorraine, Sébastien Chavanel
Stage 5 Critérium du Dauphiné, Christophe Kern
Prologue Boucles de la Mayenne, Sébastien Turgot
Stage 2 Route du Sud, Anthony Charteau
France Time Trial Championships, Christophe Kern
Stage 19 Tour de France, Pierre Rolland
Young rider classification in the Tour de France, Pierre Rolland

== 2012 – Team Europcar ==
Stage 3 Étoile de Bessèges, Pierre Rolland
Overall Tour de Normandie, Jérôme Cousin

Stage 2, Jérôme Cousin

Brabantse Pijl, Thomas Voeckler
Overall La Tropicale Amissa Bongo, Anthony Charteau

Stages 1 & 5, Yohann Gène
Stage 3, Thomas Voeckler

Stage 5 Four Days of Dunkirk, Matteo Pelucchi
Stage 3 Rhône-Alpes Isère Tour, Jérôme Cousin
Stage 4 Rhône-Alpes Isère Tour, Angelo Tulik
Stage 3 Ronde de l'Oise, Matteo Pelucchi
Stages 10 & 16 Tour de France, Thomas Voeckler
Stage 11 Tour de France, Pierre Rolland
Mountains classification in the Tour de France, Thomas Voeckler
Polynormande, Tony Hurel
Overall Mi-Août Bretonne, David Veilleux

Stage 1, David Veilleux

Overall Tour du Limousin, Yukiya Arashiro
Tre Valli Varesine, David Veilleux

== 2013 – Team Europcar ==
Overall La Tropicale Amissa Bongo, Yohann Gène

Stage 6, Yohann Gène

Stages 2 & 4 Étoile de Bessèges, Bryan Coquard
Stage 3 Étoile de Bessèges, Jérôme Cousin
Stages 8 & 9 Tour de Langkawi, Bryan Coquard
Prologue Paris–Nice, Damien Gaudin
Cholet-Pays de Loire, Damien Gaudin
Stage 4 Tour de Normandie, Anthony Charteau
Overall Circuit de la Sarthe, Pierre Rolland

Stage 4, Pierre Rolland

Tour du Finistère, Cyril Gautier
Overall Tour of Turkey, Natnael Berhane

Stage 3, Natnael Berhane

Stage 2 Tour de Picardie, Bryan Coquard
Stage 1 Critérium du Dauphiné, David Veilleux
Stage 6 Critérium du Dauphiné, Thomas Voeckler
Overall Route du Sud, Thomas Voeckler

Stage 2, Yohann Gène
Stage 3, Thomas Voeckler

Overall Boucles de la Mayenne, David Veilleux
Japan Road Race Championships, Yukiya Arashiro
Stage 4 Tour des Fjords, Angelo Tulik
Châteauroux Classic, Bryan Coquard
Overall Tour du Poitou-Charentes, Thomas Voeckler

Stage 4 (ITT), Thomas Voeckler

== 2014 – Team Europcar ==
Overall La Tropicale Amissa Bongo, Natnael Berhane
Stages 3 & 4 Étoile de Bessèges, Bryan Coquard
Route Adélie, Bryan Coquard
Paris–Camembert, Bryan Coquard
La Roue Tourangelle, Angelo Tulik
Stage 5 Four Days of Dunkirk, Jimmy Engoulvent
Stage 1 Tour de Picardie, Bryan Coquard
Eritrea Time Trial Championships, Natnael Berhane
Prologue Boucles de la Mayenne, Jimmy Engoulvent
Stage 3 Boucles de la Mayenne, Yohann Gène
Stage 2 Tour du Limousin, Cyril Gautier

== 2015 – Team Europcar ==
Namibia Road Race Championships, Dan Craven
Stage 3 Étoile de Bessèges, Bryan Coquard
Classica Corsica, Thomas Boudat
Overall Vuelta a Castilla y León, Pierre Rolland

Stage 3, Pierre Rolland

Stage 1 Four Days of Dunkirk, Bryan Coquard
Stage 3 Rhône-Alpes Isère Tour, Fabrice Jeandesboz
Stages 2 & 4 Route du Sud, Bryan Coquard

== 2016 – Direct Énergie ==
Overall La Tropicale Amissa Bongo, Adrien Petit

Stages 3, 5 & 6 (ITT), Adrien Petit

Overall Tour La Provence, Thomas Voeckler

Stage 1, Thomas Voeckler

Overall Tour de Yorkshire, Thomas Voeckler

Stage 3, Thomas Voeckler

Overall Four Days of Dunkirk, Bryan Coquard

Stages 1, 2 & 3, Bryan Coquard

Overall Boucles de la Mayenne, Bryan Coquard

Prologue & Stage 2, Bryan Coquard

Stages 1 & 2 Route du Sud, Bryan Coquard
Stage 4 Vuelta a España, Lilian Calmejane

== 2017 – Direct Énergie ==
Overall Étoile de Bessèges, Lilian Calmejane

Stage 3, Lilian Calmejane

Stage 5 Volta a la Comunitat Valenciana, Bryan Coquard
Stage 4 Vuelta a Andalucía, Bryan Coquard
Overall La Tropicale Amissa Bongo, Yohann Gène

Stage 2, Tony Hurel
Stage 5, Yohann Gène

Grand Prix de la Ville de Lillers, Thomas Boudat
Overall Settimana Internazionale di Coppi e Bartali, Lilian Calmejane

Stage 3, Thomas Boudat
Stage 4, Lilian Calmejane

Overall Circuit de la Sarthe, Lilian Calmejane

Stages 2a & 4, Bryan Coquard
Stage 3, Lilian Calmejane

Stage 1 Rhône-Alpes Isère Tour, Jérémy Cornu
Stage 4 Four Days of Dunkirk, Sylvain Chavanel
Stage 1 Tour of Belgium, Bryan Coquard
Stage 8 Tour de France, Lilian Calmejane

== 2018 – Direct Énergie ==
Stage 1 Vuelta a Andalucía Ruta Ciclista Del Sol, Thomas Boudat
Overall Tour du Haut Var, Jonathan Hivert

Stages 1 & 2, Jonathan Hivert

La Drôme Classic, Lilian Calmejane
Stage 3 Paris–Nice, Jonathan Hivert
Stage 5 Paris–Nice, Jérôme Cousin
Paris-Troyes, Adrien Petit
Cholet-Pays de Loire, Thomas Boudat
Paris–Camembert, Lilian Calmejane
Tour du Finistère, Jonathan Hivert
Prologue Tour de Luxembourg, Damien Gaudin
Stage 1 Tour de Wallonie, Romain Cardis

== 2019 – Direct Énergie ==
Overall La Tropicale Amissa Bongo, Niccolò Bonifazio

Stages 1, 2 & 5, Niccolò Bonifazio

Grand Prix Cycliste la Marseillaise, Anthony Turgis
Classic Sud-Ardèche, Lilian Calmejane
Ronde van Drenthe, Pim Ligthart
GP Miguel Induráin, Jonathan Hivert
Stage 1 Vuelta Ciclista Comunidad de Madrid, Niccolò Bonifazio
Stage 2 Vuelta a Aragón, Jonathan Hivert
Circuit de Wallonie, Thomas Boudat
Estonia National Time Trial Championships, Rein Taaramäe
Stage 1 Tour du Limousin, Lilian Calmejane
Omloop Mandel-Leie-Schelde Meulebeke, Niccolò Bonifazio
Grote Prijs Jef Scherens, Niccolò Bonifazio
Paris-Chauny, Anthony Turgis

== 2020 – Team Total Direct Energie ==
Stage 7 La Tropicale Amissa Bongo, Lorrenzo Manzin
Stage 2 Tour of Saudi Arabia, Niccolò Bonifazio
Stage 5 Paris–Nice, Niccolò Bonifazio

== 2021 – Team Total Direct Energie ==
Clàssica Comunitat Valenciana 1969, Lorrenzo Manzin
Stage 3 Vuelta Asturias, Pierre Latour
Overall Tour du Rwanda, Cristián Rodríguez

Stage 4, Valentin Ferron
Stage 8, Cristián Rodríguez

Grote Prijs Jef Scherens, Niccolò Bonifazio

== 2022 – Team TotalEnergies ==
Prologue & Stage 5 Tour du Rwanda, Alexandre Geniez
Stage 1 Tour du Rwanda, Sandy Dujardin
Stage 6 Paris–Nice, Mathieu Burgaudeau
Ronde van Drenthe, Dries Van Gestel
Grand Prix du Morbihan, Julien Simon
Tour du Finistère, Julien Simon
Stage 2 Critérium du Dauphiné, Alexis Vuillermoz
Stage 6 Critérium du Dauphiné, Valentin Ferron
Stage 3 Tour de Suisse, Peter Sagan
Poland National Time Trial Championships, Maciej Bodnar
Slovakia National Road Race Championships, Peter Sagan
Stage 1 Tour du Limousin, Julien Simon
Stage 5 Tour Poitou-Charentes en Nouvelle Aquitaine, Lorrenzo Manzin

== 2023 – Team TotalEnergies ==
Overall La Tropicale Amissa Bongo, Geoffrey Soupe

Stage 1, Geoffrey Soupe
Stages 2 & 3, Jason Tesson

Stage 4 Tour du Rwanda, Thomas Bonnet
Paris–Camembert, Valentin Ferron
Stage 2 Route d'Occitanie, Jason Tesson
Stage 7 Vuelta a España, Geoffrey Soupe

== 2024 – Team TotalEnergies ==
Stage 5 (ITT) Tour du Rwanda, Pierre Latour
La Roue Tourangelle, Jason Tesson
Stage 1 Boucles de la Mayenne, Emilien Jeannière
Stage 9 Tour de France, Anthony Turgis
Overall Tour of İstanbul, Mathieu Burgaudeau

Stage 1, Emilien Jeannière
Stage 2 & 3, Mathieu Burgaudeau

Stage 4 Tour of Taihu Lake, Jason Tesson
Overall Tour de Kyushu, Emilien Jeannière

Stage 1 & 2, Emilien Jeannière

== 2025 – Team TotalEnergies ==
Grote Prijs Jean-Pierre Monseré, Alexys Brunel

== Supplementary statistics ==
=== 2000 to 2020 ===
Grand Tours by highest finishing position
Race	2000	2001	2002	2003	2004	2005	2006	2007	2008	2009	2010	2011	2012	2013	2014	2015	2016	2017	2018	2019	2020
Giro d'Italia	–	135	–	–	–	35	50	30	–	70	23	–	–	–	4	–	–	–	–	–	–
Tour de France	19	6	36	20	18	28	28	46	31	20	41	4	8	24	11	10	43	25	30	66	31
Vuelta a España	–	–	–	–	–	75	83	32	36	48	54	–	–	–	13	15	55	–	–	–	45
Major week-long stage races by highest finishing position
Race	2000	2001	2002	2003	2004	2005	2006	2007	2008	2009	2010	2011	2012	2013	2014	2015	2016	2017	2018	2019	2020
Tour Down Under	–	–	–	–	–	–	11	11	18	30	–	–	–	–	36	–	–	–	–	–	–
Paris–Nice	4	28	7	5	14	18	44	14	18	9	17	21	30	23	6	22	24	21	41	16	58
Tirreno–Adriatico	–	94	–	–	20	5	62	24	–	31	–	–	–	–	26	35	–	–	–	–	64
Volta a Catalunya	–	–	–	–	–	15	17	13	8	46	–	–	–	–	34	39	–	–	–	–	NH
Tour of the Basque Country	–	–	–	–	27	39	16	36	18	25	–	–	–	–	19	–	–	–	–	–	NH
Tour de Romandie	–	–	–	–	–	19	25	27	43	49	–	36	31	19	21	23	–	–	–	–	NH
Critérium du Dauphiné	14	30	48	28	19	26	20	14	12	17	6	6	21	56	30	25	34	50	–	–	38
Tour de Suisse	–	–	–	–	–	20	28	18	24	57	–	–	–	–	42	–	–	36	31	19	NH
Tour de Pologne	–	–	–	–	–	19	46	10	42	67	–	–	–	–	28	–	–	–	–	–	–
Eneco Tour	–	–	–	–	–	27	15	50	14	46	–	–	–	–	16	–	–	–	–	70	34
Monument races by highest finishing position
Monument	2000	2001	2002	2003	2004	2005	2006	2007	2008	2009	2010	2011	2012	2013	2014	2015	2016	2017	2018	2019	2020
Milan–San Remo	–	–	–	–	–	13	29	59	6	70	–	67	–	15	26	–	–	–	–	38	29
Tour of Flanders	–	–	31	–	–	40	18	34	93	11	10	28	8	8	11	74	33	9	–	23	4
Paris–Roubaix	OTL	43	OTL	13	77	62	21	41	35	24	20	16	2	5	24	40	10	9	46	15	NH
Liège–Bastogne–Liège	–	–	30	23	45	14	34	11	34	36	10	–	4	24	14	27	89	56	52	93	28
Giro di Lombardia	–	–	–	–	–	DNF	24	56	84	73	–	DNF	–	17	28	–	–	45	–	–	–
Classics by highest finishing position
Classic	2000	2001	2002	2003	2004	2005	2006	2007	2008	2009	2010	2011	2012	2013	2014	2015	2016	2017	2018	2019	2020
Omloop Het Nieuwsblad	–	9	49	–	–	14	8	31	54	11	15	31	9	18	60	17	7	10	–	20	25
Kuurne–Brussels–Kuurne	–	31	49	–	65	–	13	21	35	14	7	6	7	–	112	22	13	29	23	3	9
Strade Bianche	Did not Exist							–	–	–	–	–	–	–	–	–	–	–	–	–	–
E3 Harelbeke	–	–	64	–	56	17	23	68	4	43	11	11	8	10	33	17	24	42	29	15	NH
Gent–Wevelgem	–	19	31	–	–	42	15	20	2	54	–	16	72	16	13	DNF	26	–	–	6	29
Amstel Gold Race	–	–	–	30	–	9	32	27	10	49	–	–	5	24	10	–	4	53	–	–	NH
La Flèche Wallonne	–	–	41	25	60	18	22	16	11	30	26	–	–	–	31	14	–	20	–	–	28
Clásica de San Sebastián	–	–	–	–	–	8	1	9	13	18	–	–	–	–	17	–	–	–	–	–	NH
Paris–Tours	85	24	12	5	18	18	12	9	3	16	5	15	11	40	2	29	5	63	35	2	13

=== 2021 to present ===
Grand Tours by highest finishing position
Race	2021	2022	2023
Giro d'Italia	—	—	—
Tour de France	46	57	31
Vuelta a España	—	—	11
Major week-long stage races by highest finishing position
Race	2021	2022	2023
Tour Down Under	NH		—
Paris–Nice	16	14	14
Tirreno–Adriatico	18	17	69
Volta a Catalunya	—	—	—
Tour of the Basque Country	22	25	20
Tour de Romandie	—	—	—
Critérium du Dauphiné	—	35	37
Tour de Suisse	11	17	52
Tour de Pologne	—	—	—
Benelux Tour	—	NH (Note: The Organisers cancelled the 2022 edition due to an "overcrowded" calendar.)	—
Monument races by highest finishing position
Monument	2021	2022	2023
Milan–San Remo	10	2	9
Tour of Flanders	8	29	17
Paris–Roubaix	13	24	18
Liège–Bastogne–Liège	41	21	30
Il Lombardia	—	29	33
Classics by highest finishing position
Classic	2021	2022	2023
Omloop Het Nieuwsblad	15	25	45
Kuurne–Brussels–Kuurne	2	6	17
Strade Bianche	—	—	37
E3 Harelbeke	12	13	38
Gent–Wevelgem	9	3	32
Amstel Gold Race	—	51	13
La Flèche Wallonne	—	10	28
Clásica de San Sebastián	70	32	59
Paris–Tours	16	6	13

Legend
—	Did not compete
DNF	Did not finish
NH	Not held
