= Fabian Wegmann =

German road bicycle racer

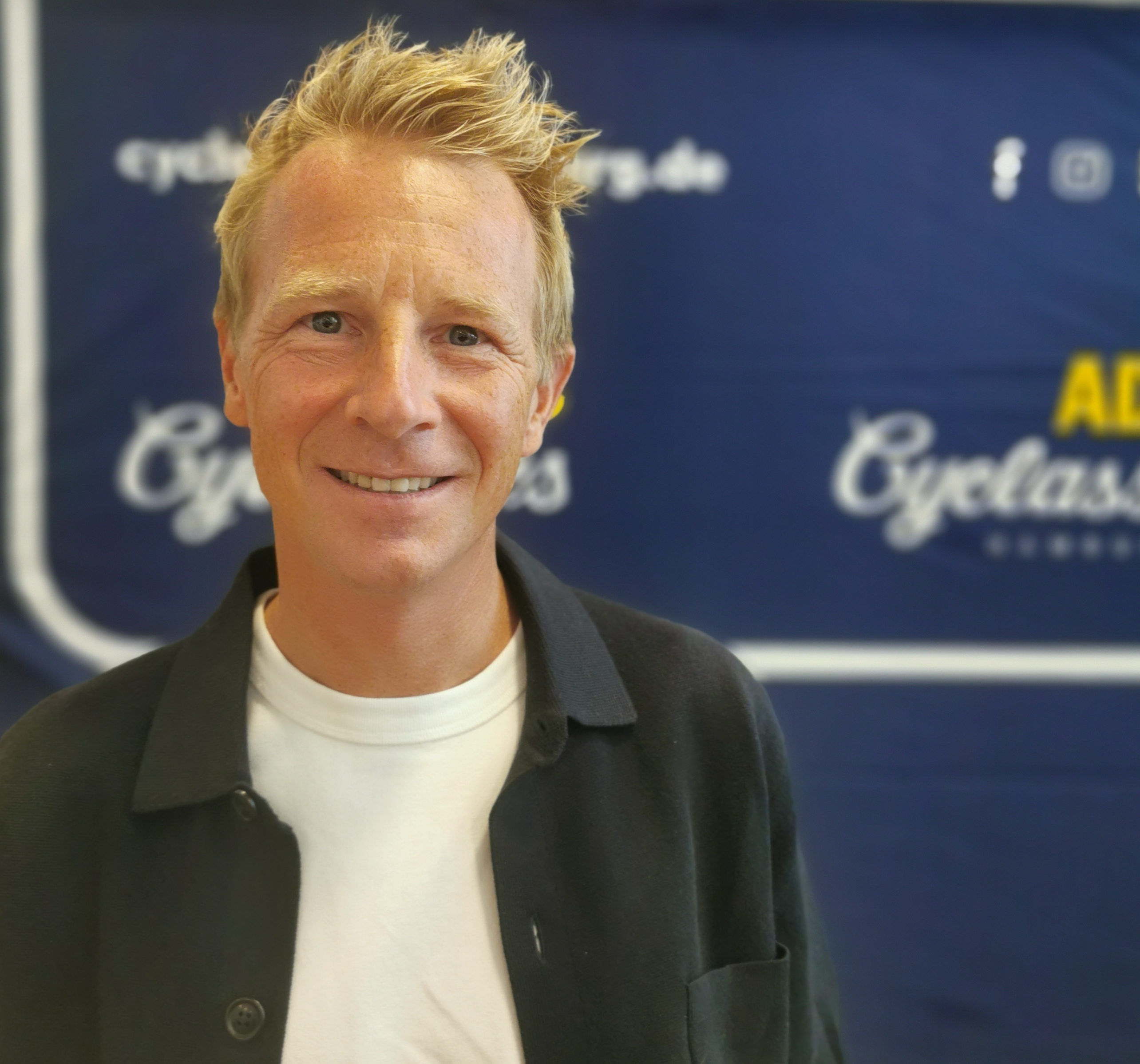
- Wegmann at the 2026 Hamburg Cyclassics

Personal information
- Full name: Fabian Wegmann
- Born: 20 June 1980 (age 46) Münster, North Rhine-Westphalia, West Germany
- Height: 1.76 m (5 ft 9 in)
- Weight: 64 kg (141 lb)

Cycling career
- Sport: Cycling
- Discipline: Road
- Role: Rider
- Rider type: All-rounder

Amateur team
- 1999–2001: RV Sossenheim

Professional teams
- 2002–2008: Gerolsteiner
- 2009–2010: Team Milram
- 2011: Leopard Trek
- 2012–2014: Garmin–Barracuda
- 2015: Cult Energy Pro Cycling
- 2016: Stölting Service Group

Major wins
- Grand Tours Giro d'Italia Mountains classification (2004) One-day races and Classics National Road Race Championships (2007, 2008, 2012) Tre Valli Varesine (2004) GP Miguel Induráin (2006, 2008) Eschborn–Frankfurt City Loop (2009, 2010)

Fabian Wegmann (born 20 June 1980) is a German former professional road racing cyclist. Born in Münster, North Rhine-Westphalia, Wegmann currently resides in Freiburg im Breisgau, Baden-Württemberg, Germany.

== Major results ==
1999
2nd Circuit du Hainaut
6th Rund um den Henninger Turm U23
2001
7th Groningen–Münster
2002
6th GP Triberg-Schwarzwald
2003
1st Overall Sachsen Tour

1st Stage 3

2nd Overall Rheinland-Pfalz Rundfahrt
3rd Road race, National Road Championships
3rd Grand Prix de Fourmies
5th Trofeo Alcúdia
7th Coppa Placci
9th Giro del Piemonte
2004
1st Mountains classification, Giro d'Italia
1st Tre Valli Varesine
3rd Road race, National Road Championships
3rd Giro della Romagna
4th Gran Premio di Chiasso
5th Gran Premio Città di Camaiore
5th Coppa Sabatini
6th GP Miguel Induráin
8th Coppa Placci
Vuelta a Mallorca

8th Trofeo Calvià
9th Trofeo Soller

9th Sparkassen Giro Bochum
10th GP Ouest–France
2005
1st San Francisco Grand Prix
1st GP Triberg-Schwarzwald
1st Stage 5 Tour de Pologne
3rd Overall Rheinland-Pfalz Rundfahrt
3rd Sparkassen Giro Bochum
4th Gran Premio Bruno Beghelli
6th Giro di Lombardia
8th Overall Volta ao Algarve
10th Rund um Köln
10th La Flèche Wallonne
2006
1st GP Miguel Induráin
1st Stage 1 Critérium du Dauphiné Libéré
3rd Giro di Lombardia
10th GP Ouest–France
2007
1st Road race, National Road Championships
1st Rund um die Nürnberger Altstadt
2nd Gran Premio Bruno Beghelli
2nd Japan Cup
4th Overall Tour de Pologne
8th Overall Bayern Rundfahrt
9th Road race, UCI Road World Championships
2008
1st Road race, National Road Championships
1st GP Miguel Induráin
4th Eschborn–Frankfurt City Loop
6th Brabantse Pijl
6th Gran Premio Bruno Beghelli
7th Road race, UCI Road World Championships
7th Coppa Sabatini
10th Vattenfall Cyclassics
2009
1st Rund um den Henninger Turm
2nd Monte Paschi Strade Bianche
3rd Brabantse Pijl
3rd GP Miguel Induráin
7th Grand Prix de Wallonie
7th Gran Premio dell'Insubria-Lugano
8th Trofeo Calvià
9th Gran Premio di Lugano
9th Grote Prijs Jef Scherens
2010
1st Eschborn–Frankfurt City Loop
3rd Grote Prijs Jef Scherens
6th Trofeo Magaluf-Palmanova
7th Grand Prix Cycliste de Québec
2011
3rd GP Miguel Induráin
3rd Grand Prix de la Somme
4th Grand Prix Cycliste de Québec
6th Les Boucles du Sud-Ardèche
6th Münsterland Giro
10th Strade Bianche
10th Grand Prix Cycliste de Montréal
2012
1st Road race, National Road Championships
8th Amstel Gold Race
8th Grand Prix Cycliste de Québec
2013
4th Grand Prix Cycliste de Québec
2014
7th Eschborn–Frankfurt – Rund um den Finanzplatz
10th Trofeo Muro-Port d'Alcúdia
2015
7th Grand Prix of Aargau Canton
2016
10th Eschborn–Frankfurt – Rund um den Finanzplatz
10th Grand Prix de Wallonie

=== Grand Tour general classification results timeline ===
Grand Tour	2004	2005	2006	2007	2008	2009	2010	2011	2012	2013	2014
Giro d'Italia	36	—	—	—	—	—	DNF	DNF	—	—	DNF
Tour de France	DNF	79	65	60	DNF	134	118	—	—	—	—
Vuelta a España	Did not contest during his career										

=== Classics results timeline ===
Monument	2002	2003	2004	2005	2006	2007	2008	2009	2010	2011	2012	2013	2014	2015	2016
Milan–San Remo	—	100	28	99	14	DNF	47	24	—	43	107	87	27	—	—
Tour of Flanders	—	—	—	—	—	DNF	—	—	—	—	—	—	—	—	—
Paris–Roubaix	Did not contest during his career														
Liège–Bastogne–Liège	—	48	35	15	28	29	22	29	16	DNF	52	47	74	DNF	—
Giro di Lombardia	DNF	DNF	DNF	6	3	14	—	32	15	28	DNF	DNF	—	—	—
Classic	2002	2003	2004	2005	2006	2007	2008	2009	2010	2011	2012	2013	2014	2015	2016
Amstel Gold Race	DNF	39	57	45	13	13	11	68	25	20	8	12	14	114	—
La Flèche Wallonne	—	38	13	10	11	11	30	18	DNF	63	26	55	77	—	DNF

Legend
—	Did not compete
DNF	Did not finish
