= Danilo Di Luca =

Italian cyclist (born 1976)

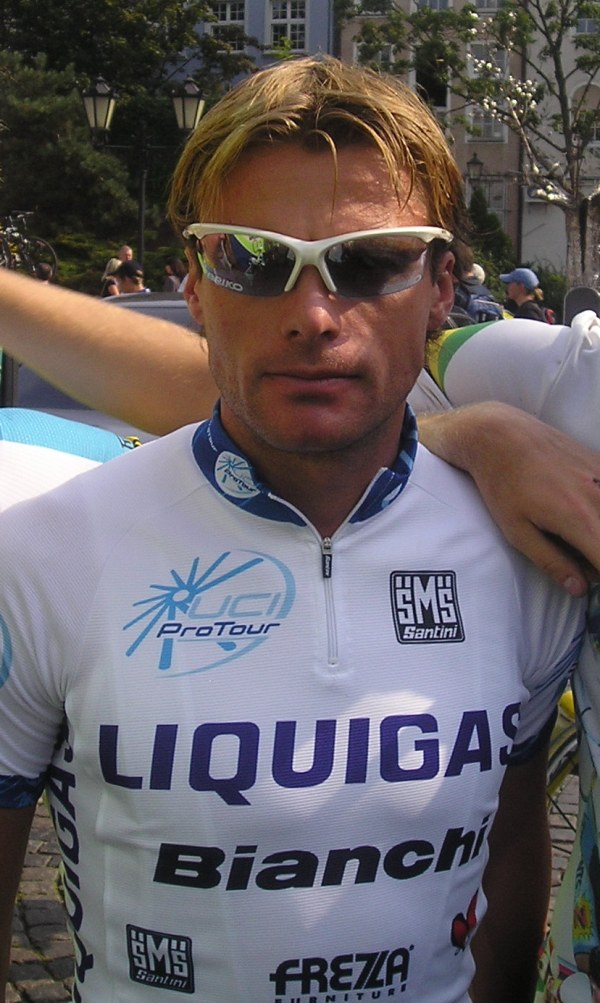
- Di Luca at the 2005 Tour de Pologne

Personal information
- Full name: Danilo Di Luca
- Nickname: The Killer from Spoltore
- Born: 2 January 1976 (age 50) Spoltore, Italy
- Height: 1.68 m (5 ft 6 in)
- Weight: 61 kg (134 lb)

Cycling career
- Sport: Cycling
- Current team: Suspended
- Discipline: Road
- Role: Rider
- Rider type: All rounder

Professional teams
- 1998: Riso Scotti
- 1999–2001: Cantina Tollo–Alexia Alluminio
- 2002–2004: Saeco–Longoni Sport
- 2005–2007: Liquigas–Bianchi
- 2008–2009: LPR Brakes–Ballan
- 2011: Team Katusha
- 2012: Acqua & Sapone
- 2013: Vini Fantini–Selle Italia

Major wins
- Grand Tours Giro d'Italia General classification (2007) 6 individual stages (2000, 2001, 2005, 2007) 1 TTT stage (2007) Vuelta a España 2 individual stages (2002, 2006) Stage races Tour of the Basque Country (2005) One-day races and Classics Giro di Lombardia (2001) Liège–Bastogne–Liège (2007) Amstel Gold Race (2005) La Flèche Wallonne (2005) Other UCI ProTour (2005)

Danilo Di Luca (born 2 January 1976) is a former Italian professional road racing cyclist, best known for winning the 2007 Giro d'Italia, but also for several positive doping tests, the last of which resulting in a lifetime ban from the sport.

Di Luca is also one of six riders to have won each of the three Ardennes classics; he won the Amstel Gold Race and La Flèche Wallonne in 2005, and Liège–Bastogne–Liège in 2007. During his career, Di Luca rode for the Riso Scotti, Cantina Tollo–Acqua & Sapone, Saeco, Liquigas, LPR Brakes–Farnese Vini, Team Katusha, Acqua & Sapone and Vini Fantini–Selle Italia squads.

Di Luca's career was also dogged by numerous infractions, involving three suspensions in relation to doping. In 2007, Di Luca was suspended for three months towards the end of the season, for visiting previously banned doctor Carlo Santuccione, which later escalated into the Oil for Drugs case. In 2009, at the Giro d'Italia, Di Luca tested positive on two occasions for CERA, and was given a backdated – to July 2009 – two-year ban in February 2010, which was later reduced to nine months. His third positive test came just before the 2013 Giro d'Italia, when he tested positive for erythropoietin (EPO) in an out-of-competition test. Di Luca expressed surprise at the test results, but he was given a lifetime ban in December 2013.

Danilo Di Luca wrote his autobiography Bestie da Vittoria, which means "Beasts for victories". Such book is also a denunciation of the use of doping substances among cyclists and the use of anti-doping controls as a way to manipulate competition results.

== Career ==
=== Early years ===
Born in Spoltore, province of Pescara, Di Luca began his professional career in 1998 in the Riso Scotti team. He showed talent by winning the under-23 version of the Giro D'Italia. His first pro win was in 1999, when, moving to Cantina Tollo-Alexia Alluminio, he won the first stage of the Giro d'Abruzzo. He remained in the team taking wins in 2001 such as the fourth stage of the Giro d'Italia and the Giro di Lombardia. Then, he transferred to Saeco-Longoni Sport.

During his time at Saeco-Longoni he lost the Vuelta al País Vasco on the last stage, a mountain time trial in which Andreas Klöden took the lead and the win. Combined with injuries and lack of confidence of the team directors, his performance suffered. In 2004 Italian officials investigated Di Luca for doping. Cyclingnews.com said: "Di Luca was recorded in several phone conversations with Eddy Mazzoleni in which he allegedly talked about doping products, the investigation led to Di Luca's non-participation in the 2004 Tour de France."

=== 2005 ===
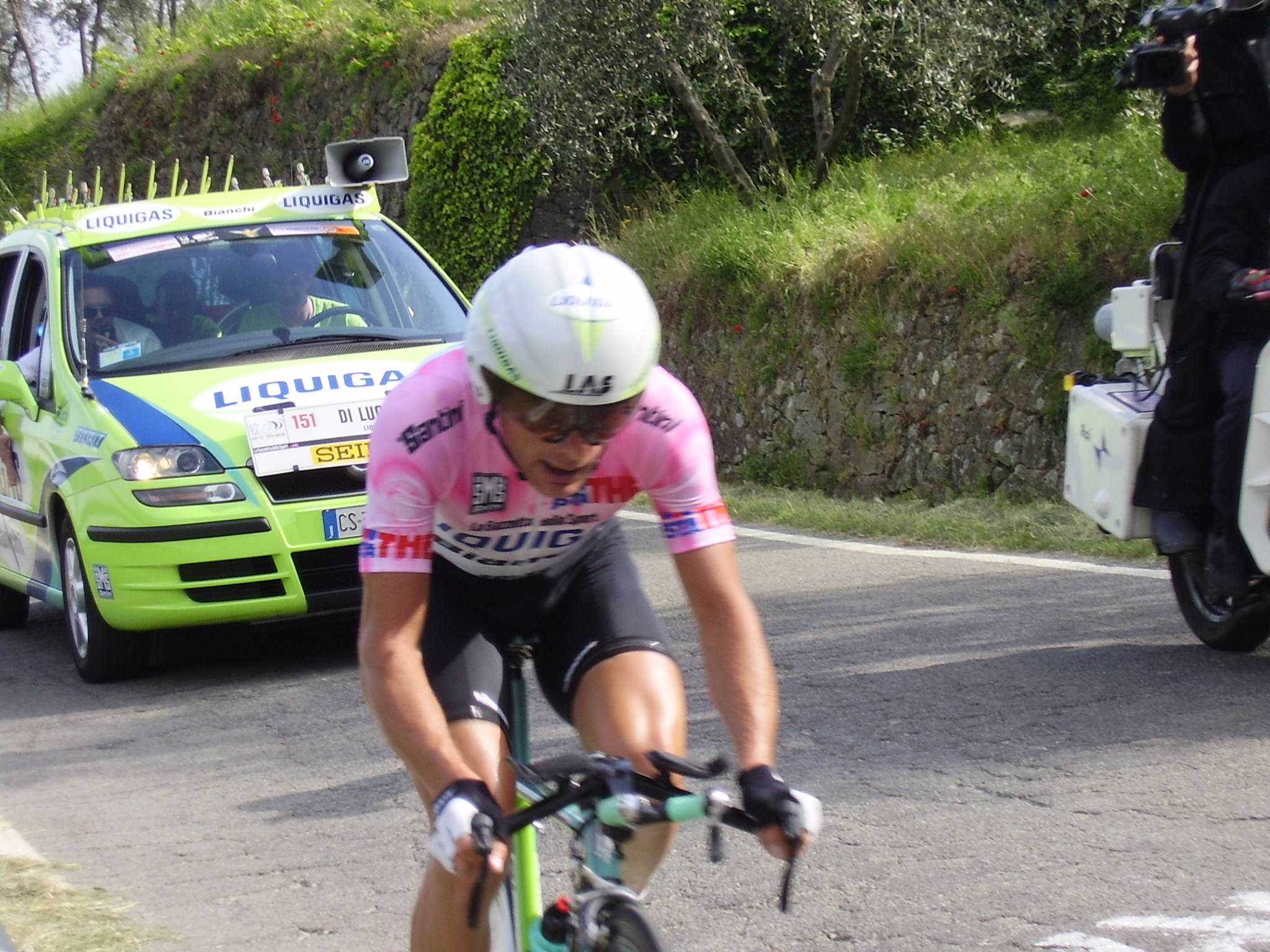
Di Luca at the 2005 Giro d'Italia

In 2005, Di Luca switched to Liquigas–Bianchi, with Mario Cipollini, Dario Cioni, Stefano Garzelli and Magnus Bäckstedt. He led the team for the spring classics. His first victory came in the first stage of the UCI ProTour race Vuelta al País Vasco, which he won overall after defeating Aitor Osa in the final time trial. He won the Amstel Gold Race and La Flèche Wallonne, taking the ProTour leader's white jersey.

Di Luca was seen as suited to races lasting only a few days. His success in the 2005 Giro d'Italia came as a surprise. Here he won two stages and finished fourth. He finished fifth in the Tour de Pologne. With a fourth in the 2005 Züri-Metzgete, he became 2005 UCI ProTour champion.

=== 2006 ===
Di Luca was forced to retire from the 2006 Tour de France, due to a urinary infection. He recovered to compete in the 2006 Vuelta a España, winning the fifth stage and holding the lead (ceding it to Janez Brajkovič). Di Luca's performances in the classics, the Giro, and other races, were a letdown from the triumphs of 2005.

=== 2007 ===
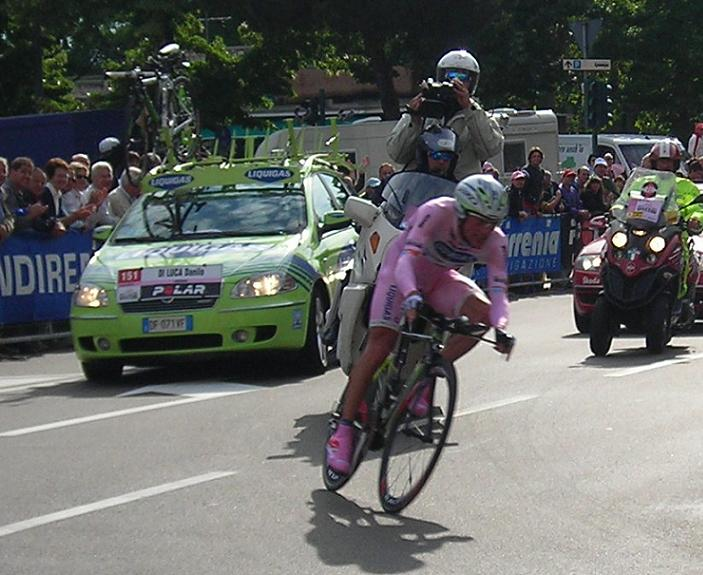
Di Luca at the 2007 Giro d'Italia

Di Luca won Milano–Torino in March and Liège–Bastogne–Liège in April. He took stages 4 and 12 en route to the victory in the 2007 Giro d'Italia. After the Giro, it was revealed that Di Luca had unspecified low hormone levels. Italian authorities are determining if they are a consequence of racing at a high level for three weeks or some kind of masking agent. On 28 September, Di Luca withdrew from the UCI road championship calling his treatment "a scandal" after doping allegations.

Di Luca was leading the 2007 UCI ProTour when he was suspended before the final race, the Giro di Lombardia, due to alleged involvement in the Oil for Drugs case, for which he was suspended for three months through the close season.

=== 2008–2009 ===
In 2008, Di Luca had a quiet year as his new team, LPR Brakes–Ballan, were not invited to many races. In 2009, they received a wildcard entry to the Giro d'Italia and Di Luca won the fourth stage. He then came second on the fifth stage, gaining the pink jersey as race leader, and extended his lead by winning the tenth stage. He lost time on the two time trial stages and finished second overall, winning the points classification.

On 22 July 2009, it was announced that Di Luca had tested positive for CERA on 20 and 28 May 2009, during the Giro d'Italia. He was provisionally suspended with immediate effect by the UCI. He had been targeted for testing using information from his biological passport's blood profile, previous test results and his race schedule. On 8 August, his positive tests were confirmed. On 1 February 2010, the Italian Olympic committee (CONI) suspended him for two years (effective as of 22 July 2009) for the Giro doping incident. Di Luca must also pay a €280,000 fine, as well as the costs incurred in both the analysis and counter-analysis of his Giro samples: Di Luca indicated his intention to contest the decision.

=== 2010–2011 ===
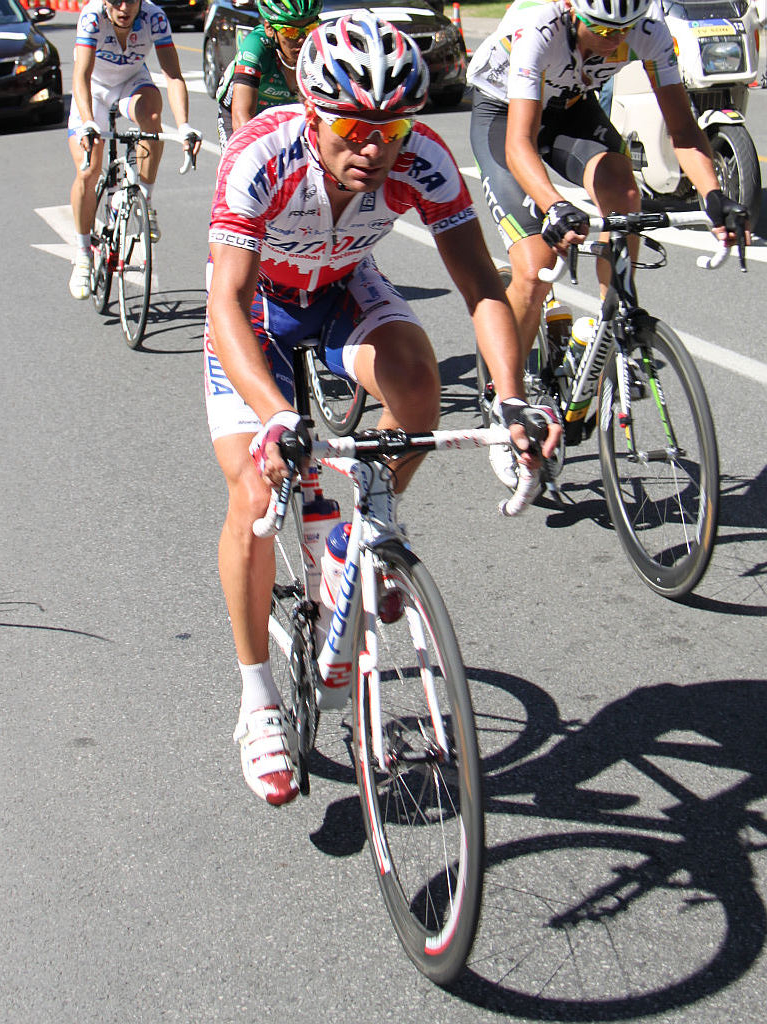
Di Luca at the 2011 Grand Prix Cycliste de Montréal

On 15 October 2010, CONI announced that Di Luca's ban had been reduced to nine months and seven days, allowing Di Luca to return as of that very day (though the season was nearly over). This was due to his reported cooperation with investigators, detailing doping methods. CONI also announced the reduction of Di Luca's fine, from €280,000 to €106,400, but the UCI contends that he will still have to pay the full amount based on when his doping incident occurred. His results from the 2009 Giro were stricken from the record.

In the 2011 season, he competed for Team Katusha, and his performances were somewhat mitigated since he held no victories. His notable results were fourth of the Giro d'Italia's 6th stage and fourth in the Tour de Suisse's first stage.

After the season, Di Luca signed a contract for the 2012 season with Acqua & Sapone.

=== 2013 ===
In April 2013, Di Luca signed for the Vini Fantini–Selle Italia team, who were subsequently awarded a wildcard place to race in the Giro d'Italia. On 24 May, while Di Luca was riding in the Giro, the UCI announced that he had had an adverse finding in an out-of-competition doping test at his home on 29 April. Di Luca was fired by his team who instructed him to leave the race by his own means. He was banned for life by CONI on 5 December. He also had his results stripped from 29 April and ordered to pay €37,985 in fines and costs.

== Major results ==
1994
1st Overall Giro della Lunigiana
1997
6th Road race, UCI Road World Under-23 Championships
1998
1st Road race, National Under-23 Road Championships
1st Overall Giro Ciclistico d'Italia

1st Stage 5b (ITT)

1st Overall Giro della Regione Friuli Venezia Giulia

1st Stage 4b (ITT)

3rd Road race, UCI Road World Under-23 Championships
1999
2nd Giro di Lombardia
2nd GP Industria & Artigianato di Larciano
3rd Giro del Friuli
4th Giro del Veneto
5th Gran Premio Industria e Commercio di Prato
7th Coppa Placci
2000
1st GP Industria & Artigianato di Larciano
1st Trofeo Pantalica
1st Stage 5 Giro d'Italia
2nd Overall Tour of the Basque Country

1st Stage 2

6th Overall Memorial Cecchi Gori
2001
1st Giro di Lombardia
1st Trofeo dello Scalatore
Giro d'Italia

1st Stage 4
Held after Stages 4–7

2nd Overall Setmana Catalana de Ciclisme

1st Stage 4

2nd Giro del Veneto
3rd GP Industria & Artigianato di Larciano
9th Coppa Bernocchi
2002
1st Giro del Veneto
1st Trofeo Laigueglia
1st Gran Premio Fred Mengoni
Vuelta a España

1st Stage 2
Held after Stage 2

2nd Overall Tirreno–Adriatico

1st Stages 3 & 5

2nd Tre Valli Varesine
3rd Subida a Urkiola
5th Overall Tour Méditerranéen
6th Clásica de San Sebastián
7th Overall Vuelta a Murcia
9th Overall Volta a la Comunitat Valenciana

1st Stage 4

9th HEW Cyclassics
2003
1st Overall Giro della Liguria

1st Stage 3b (ITT)

1st Coppa Placci
1st Tre Valli Varesine
2nd Overall Tirreno–Adriatico

1st Stage 6

2nd Gran Premio Città di Camaiore
3rd Amstel Gold Race
3rd Clásica de San Sebastián
3rd Giro del Veneto
3rd Trofeo Melinda
4th Giro dell'Emilia
8th Liège–Bastogne–Liège
2004
1st Overall Brixia Tour
1st Trofeo Matteoti
1st Stage 4 Vuelta a Murcia
2nd La Flèche Wallonne
2nd Tre Valli Varesine
2nd Gran Premio Città di Camaiore
4th Amstel Gold Race
5th Road race, National Road Championships
5th Overall Uniqa Classic
2005
1st UCI ProTour
1st Overall Tour of the Basque Country

1st Points classification
1st Stage 1

1st Amstel Gold Race
1st La Flèche Wallonne
4th Overall Giro d'Italia

1st Stages 3 & 5
Held after Stages 5 & 7–10
Held after Stages 5, 7–9 & 14

4th Züri–Metzgete
4th Giro del Lazio
5th Overall Tour de Pologne
5th Milano–Torino
5th Gran Premio Fred Mengoni
2006
Vuelta a España

1st Stage 5
Held, & after Stages 5 & 6

2nd Giro dell'Emilia
3rd Road race, National Road Championships
6th La Flèche Wallonne
6th Gran Premio Fred Mengoni
6th Trofeo Città di Borgomanero (with Ruggero Marzoli)
9th Liège–Bastogne–Liège
9th Giro di Lombardia
9th Züri–Metzgete
2007
1st Overall Giro d'Italia

1st Stages 1 (TTT), 4 & 12
Held after Stages 4, 5 & 10–14

1st Liège–Bastogne–Liège
1st Milano–Torino
3rd Amstel Gold Race
3rd La Flèche Wallonne
3rd GP Ouest-France
8th Overall Tour de Pologne
10th Overall Settimana Internazionale di Coppi e Bartali

1st Stage 3

2008
1st Overall Settimana Ciclistica Lombarda

1st Stage 4

1st Giro dell'Emilia
1st Mountains classification Tour of Britain
2nd Giro d'Oro
3rd Giro del Lazio
3rd Memorial Cimurri
5th Gran Premio Nobili Rubinetterie
8th Overall Giro d'Italia
9th Coppa Bernocchi
2009
1st Stage 1 (TTT) Settimana Ciclista Lombarda
~~2nd Overall Giro d'Italia~~

~~1st Points classification~~
~~1st Stages 4 & 10~~
~~Held after Stages 5–11~~
~~Held after Stages 4–9~~

8th Overall Giro del Trentino

1st Stage 4

2011
7th Trofeo Inca
8th Trofeo Deià
10th Tre Valli Varesine
2012
1st Gran Premio Nobili Rubinetterie
2nd Road race, National Road Championships
2nd Circuito de Getxo
3rd Coppa Agostoni
3rd Tre Valli Varesine
4th Overall Tour of Austria

1st Stage 2

6th Gran Premio Città di Camaiore
10th Overall Settimana Internazionale di Coppi e Bartali
2013
6th Giro di Toscana
10th GP Industria & Artigianato di Larciano

=== Grand Tour general classification results timeline ===
Grand Tour	1998	1999	2000	2001	2002	2003	2004	2005	2006	2007	2008	2009	2010	2011	2012	2013
Giro d'Italia	—	DNF	DNF	24	—	—	—	4	23	1	8	~~2~~	—	69	—	DNF
Tour de France	—	—	—	—	—	DNF	—	—	DNF	—	—	—	—	—	—	—
/ Vuelta a España	—	—	DNF	DNF	20	—	DNF	—	DNF	—	—	—	—	—	—	—

=== Classics results timeline ===
Monuments results timeline
Monument	1998	1999	2000	2001	2002	2003	2004	2005	2006	2007	2008	2009	2010	2011	2012	2013
Milan–San Remo	—	96	—	119	DNF	80	54	27	—	—	58	41	—	—	63	—
Tour of Flanders	Did not contest during career															
Paris–Roubaix	Did not contest during career															
Liège–Bastogne–Liège	—	—	—	—	34	8	DNS	26	9	1	—	—	—	41	—	—
Giro di Lombardia	—	2	DNF	1	45	41	—	DNF	9	—	—	—	—	—	20	—

Legend
—	Did not compete
DNF	Did not finish
DNS	Did not start

== See also ==
- List of doping cases in cycling
