= Paolo Bettini =

Italian cyclist (born 1974)

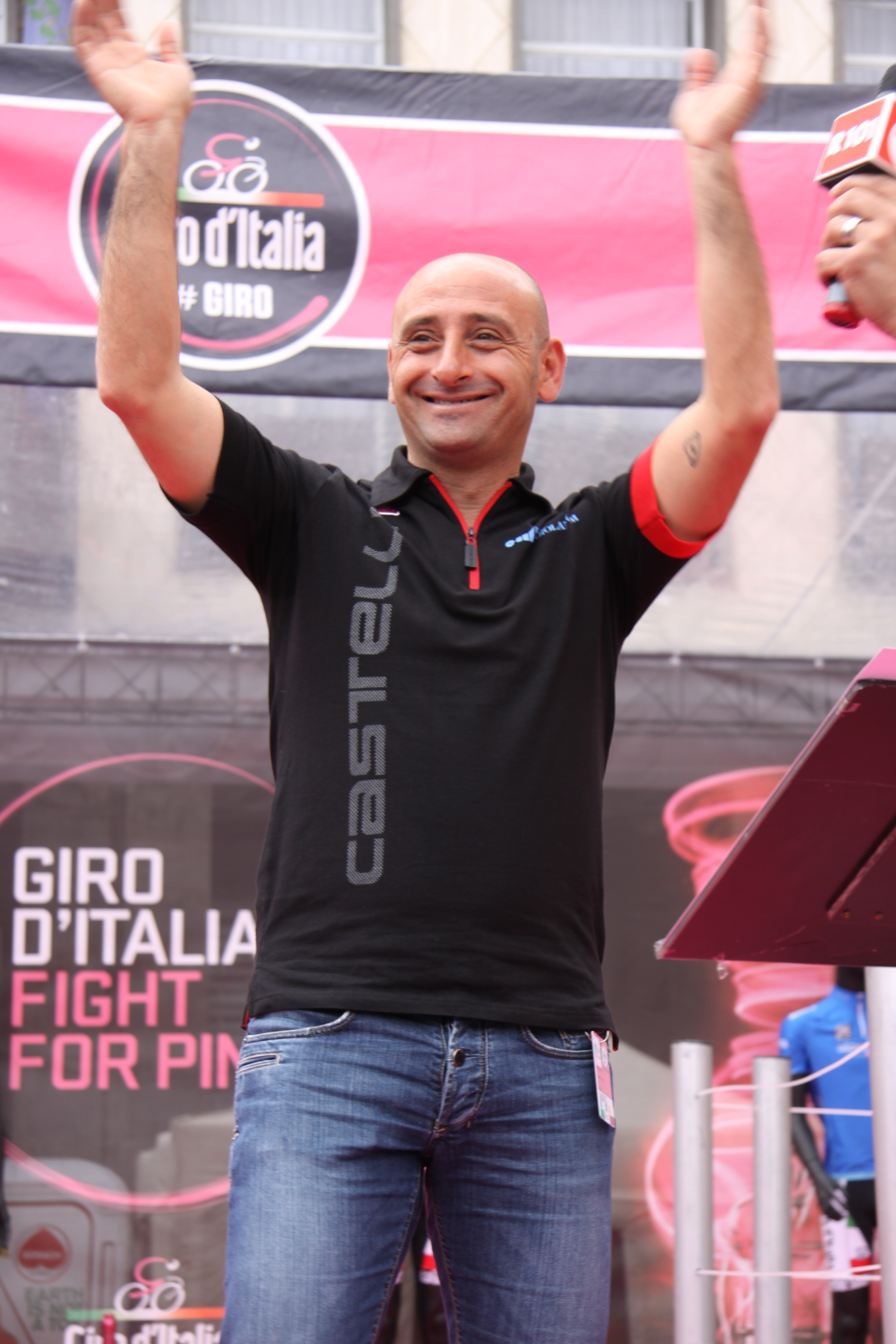
- Bettini in 2013

Personal information
- Full name: Paolo Bettini
- Nickname: Grillo
- Born: 1 April 1974 (age 52) Cecina, Italy
- Height: 1.69 m (5 ft 7 in)
- Weight: 58 kg (128 lb; 9.1 st)

Cycling career
- Sport: Cycling
- Discipline: Road
- Role: Rider
- Rider type: Classics specialist Puncheur

Professional teams
- 1997: MG Maglificio–Technogym
- 1998: Asics–CGA
- 1999–2002: Mapei–Quick-Step
- 2003–2008: Quick-Step–Davitamon

Major wins
- Grand Tours Tour de France 1 individual stage (2000) Giro d'Italia Points classification (2005, 2006) 2 individual stages (2005, 2006) Vuelta a España 5 individual stages (2005–2008) Stage races Tirreno–Adriatico (2004) One-day races and Classics Olympic Road Race (2004) World Road Race Championships (2006, 2007) National Road Race Championships (2003, 2006) Liège–Bastogne–Liège (2000, 2002) Milan–San Remo (2003) Giro di Lombardia (2005, 2006) Clásica de San Sebastián (2003) HEW Cyclassics (2003) Züri-Metzgete (2001, 2005) Other UCI Road World Cup (2002, 2003, 2004) Vélo d'Or (2006)
Medal record
Men's road bicycle racing
Representing Italy
Olympic Games
Gold medal – first place	2004 Athens	Road race
World Championships
Gold medal – first place	2007 Stuttgart	Road race
Gold medal – first place	2006 Salzburg	Road race
Silver medal – second place	2001 Lisbon	Road race

Paolo Bettini (born 1 April 1974) is an Italian former champion road racing cyclist, and the former coach of the Italian national cycling team. Considered the best classics specialist of his generation, and probably one of the strongest of all times, he won gold medals in the 2004 Athens Olympics road race and in the 2006 and 2007 World Road Race Championships. He is nicknamed Il Grillo ("the cricket") for his repeated sudden attacks and his sprinting style.

He gained prominence by winning Liège–Bastogne–Liège in 2000 and 2002. He set the record for World Cup wins in a season in 2003, winning the Milan–San Remo, HEW Cyclassics and Clásica de San Sebastián. He won the Giro di Lombardia in 2005 and 2006, the Züri-Metzgete in 2001 and 2005 and Tirreno–Adriatico in 2004.

== Career ==
=== Early career ===
Paolo Bettini lived with his family on the Tuscany coast. He began racing when he was seven and won 23 of his first 24 races. His first bike had a secondhand frame which his father, Giuliano, had painted orange. The components were cannibalised from other bikes. He started racing after the encouragement of his brother.

He came fourth in the world under-23 road championship in 1996, behind three other Italians, Giuliano Fugeras, Roberti Sgambelluri and Luca Sironi. He turned professional the following year for the MG-Technogym team. There he rode as domestique to Michele Bartoli, "a working class cyclist", wrote Stephen Farrand, "destined to work for others to earn his crust." He worked for Bartoli, who, in return, helped with advice. Bartoli won the World Cup in 1997 and 1998 with Bettini's help.

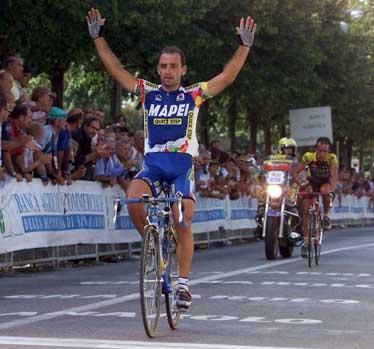
Bettini winning the 2001 Coppa Placci

Bartoli fell heavily on a knee in 1999, and Bettini was freed to race for himself. He won Liège–Bastogne–Liège in 2000 – treating himself to a €100,000 Porsche – and a flat stage of that year's Tour de France, from Agen to Dax. He won the 2001 Züri-Metzgete after a few months without wins, beating Jan Ullrich in the sprint to the finish. His success led to a feud with Bartoli. It culminated in the 2001 world championship in Lisbon, Portugal, where Bartoli refused to lead Bettini to a flying start in the sprint finish and the Spaniard, Óscar Freire, won instead.

=== 2002 World Cup and race season ===
The 2002 season was a breakthrough. In the World Cup, Bettini was caught in the final kilometres of Milan–San Remo. After his 1–2 win with Stefano Garzelli in Liège–Bastogne–Liège, Bettini ran neck-to-neck against Museeuw, who won Paris–Roubaix in a 50 km solo breakaway, and the HEW Cyclassics. A tactical ride in Giro di Lombardia earned Bettini the World Cup.

Bettini played a strong support role in Mario Cipollini's victory in the UCI Road Cycling World Championship in Zolder, Belgium.

=== 2003 World Cup and race season ===
The 2003 World Cup series started with Milan–San Remo. Attacking twice in the last hills leading down to the Primavera, Bettini had the help of Luca Paolini, who attacked down the tricky descent towards the finish.

However, injury in the Gent–Wevelgem forced Bettini to miss several races until the Tour de France in July. He then followed with a win in the HEW Cyclassics in front of Tour runner-up Jan Ullrich, and a win in the Clásica de San Sebastián.

Bettini failed to win the UCI Road Cycling World Championship despite being the favourite due to a mistake at the end of the race. Having established himself in the winning breakaway, hesitation allowed the Spaniard Igor Astarloa to break away to win. Astarloa claimed that Bettini had offered him money to relinquish the win, which Astarloa said he refused. A feud ensued, and Astarloa attributed his comment to a misunderstanding of Bettini's Italian.

=== 2004 World Cup and race season ===
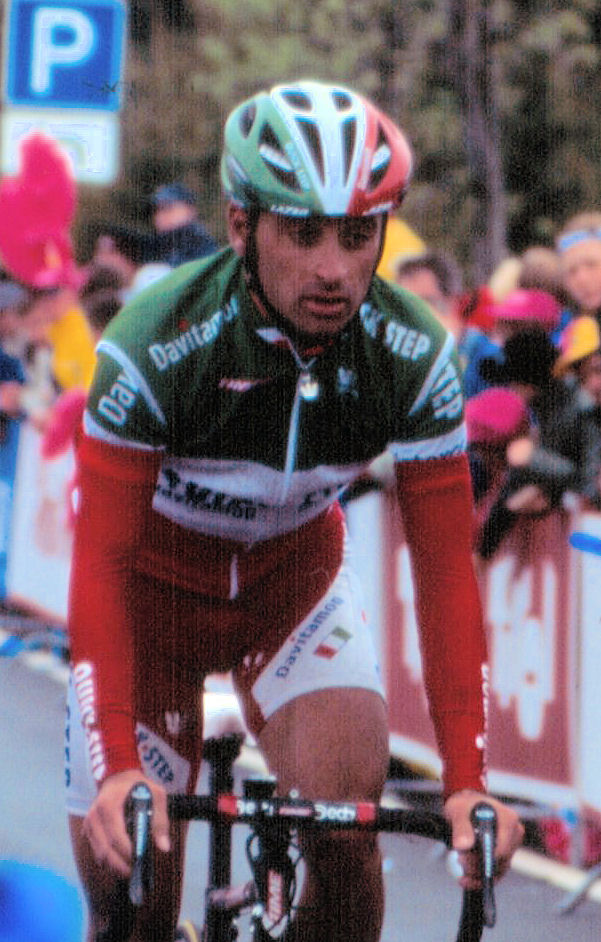
Paolo Bettini wearing the National Champion's jersey in 2004

The 2004 season started well with Milan–San Remo, but Davide Rebellin won the La Flèche Wallonne (not in the World Cup), Liège–Bastogne–Liège and Amstel Gold Race. Bettini's disappointments continued with second places in the HEW Cyclassics, which he had won previously, and in the Clásica de San Sebastián, which he had won the previous year. The points gained in Paris–Tours put him in the leader's jersey, but with the last race, the Giro di Lombardia, better suited to Rebellin, the World Cup was not yet safe. Bettini followed Rebellin throughout the race, resulting in Rebellin's quitting in frustration.

Bettini's most important victory was the 2004 Summer Olympics, where he broke away with Portuguese Sérgio Paulinho for a comfortable victory decided on a last-minute sprint with both. He again failed to win the world championship due to an injury when he banged his knee against the team car at the beginning of the race.

=== 2005 UCI ProTour and race season ===
After Milan–San Remo, Bettini had an injury-marked start which prevented significant participation in the spring classics, and he had no victories until he got two stage wins at the 2005 Giro d'Italia, where he wore the pink jersey as leader of the general classification for several days. After that, no more good results until the 2005 Vuelta a España, where he beat Alessandro Petacchi in an uphill sprint in Valladolid. After that, he took part in the world championship in Madrid, where he got into the decisive break but did not get a medal. A week later, he won Züri-Metzgete for a second time. Two weeks later, he won the Giro di Lombardia as well.

=== 2006 UCI ProTour and race season ===
Bettini won the first race of the season, the Trofeo Soller, which is part of the Challenge Mallorca. He also won the Gran Premio di Lugano, two stages in the Tirreno–Adriatico and the 15th stage in the Giro d'Italia, where he won the points classification. Following the Giro, he became the Italian road champion and won a stage at the Vuelta a España before winning the world championship.

His brother, Sauro, died in a car accident a few days after that victory, and Bettini was close to abandoning cycling. He changed his mind and won the Giro di Lombardia in tears.

On 2 March 2007, the French magazine Velo awarded Bettini its Vélo d'Or as best rider of 2006.

=== 2007 UCI ProTour and race season ===
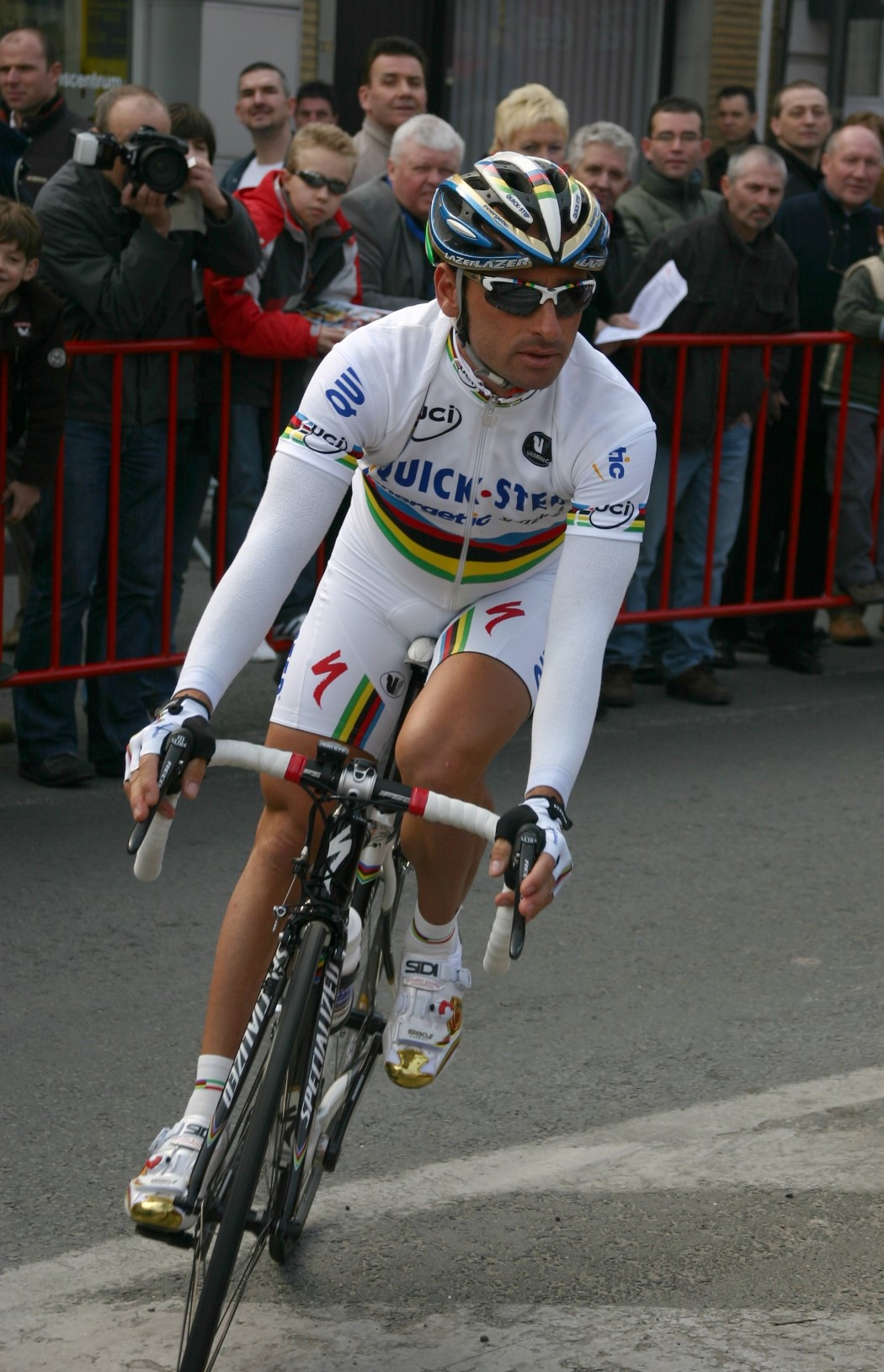
Bettini at the 2007 E3 Harelbeke wearing the rainbow jersey

Bettini raced in the second annual 2.HC-rated 2007 Tour of California and made it worth his while by capturing Stage 4 in a sprint finish. He later won the third stage of the Vuelta a España and finished second in three more stages. Then he won once again the rainbow jersey of the Elite Men's Road at Stuttgart.

=== 2008 season ===
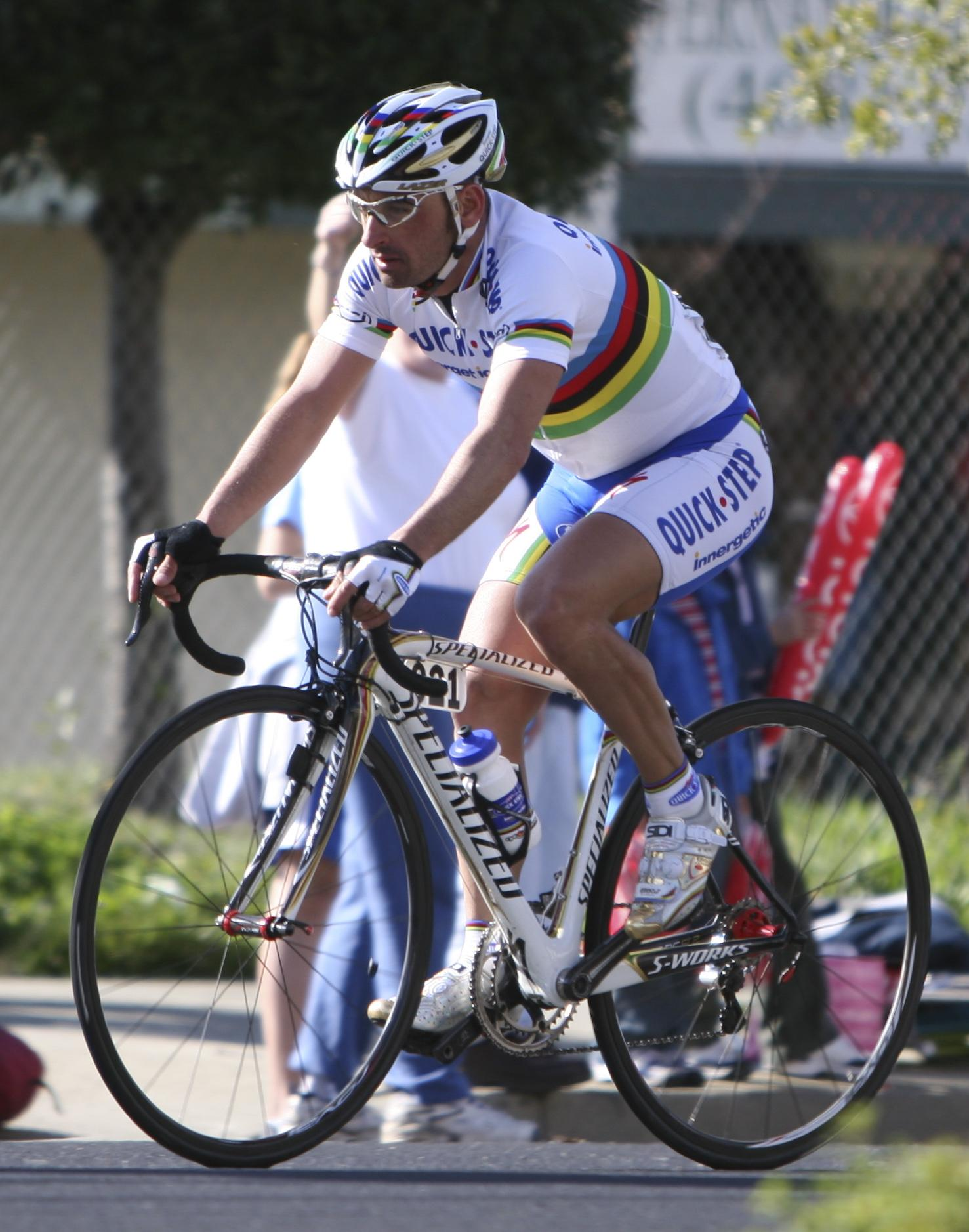
Paolo Bettini at the 2008 Tour of California

Bettini's start was plagued by injuries, including a fall at the Kuurne–Brussels–Kuurne and a rib broken when he fell on a wet descent in the Tour of the Basque Country. He won the Trofeo Matteotti and stages at the Tour of Austria and Tour de Wallonie. He also won two stages at the Vuelta a España, where he said he was leaving Quick Step after 10 years due to a financial dispute. On September 27 he announced his retirement. On 4 November, he fell during the Milan six-day and was taken to hospital unconscious.

=== Coaching career ===
On 17 June 2010, Bettini was named as the new Italian national coach, following the death of Franco Ballerini in a car accident earlier that year. He left this role in 2014 to work with Fernando Alonso on his new cycling team in preparation for its launch in 2015.

== Track racing ==
Bettini followed the path of riders before the 1970s and took up six-day racing in the winter. He rode at Munich and Grenoble in 2006. "I didn't do it for the money", he said. "I had that already. I did it through my love of racing, to see what it's like to race on a track." The bankings proved trickier than the road, however, and his debut was described as "catastrophic" as he failed to get alongside his partner in the two-man relay race, the madison, and finished the first night "with fear in his face." Charly Mottet said:

I saw him at the start of the evening and he worried me. Two hours later, I can tell you, he had won the respect of the others. He was making proper changes, he was taking part in the race and he was going better and better. The others couldn't believe their eyes [commencaient à ne plus voir le jour].

== Personal life ==
Bettini married Monica Orlandini, a literature teacher, in 2000. They moved into a farmhouse belonging to his wife's family, who have been olive farmers for four generations. They live in Riparbella, 10 km from Cecina, where Bettini was born.

== Career achievements ==
=== Major results ===
1996
1st Stage 8 Giro Ciclistico d'Italia
3rd Road race, National Under-23 Road Championships
4th Road race, UCI Road World Under-23 Championships
9th Overall Grand Prix Guillaume Tell
1997 (1 pro win)
1st Stage 2 (TTT) Hofbrau Cup
8th Overall Tour de Langkawi
1998 (1)
1st Stage 4a Tour de Romandie
3rd Trofeo Laigueglia
3rd Gran Premio Bruno Beghelli
7th Overall Giro d'Italia
7th Overall Danmark Rundt

1st Mountains classification

7th Giro della Provincia di Reggio Calabria
8th Overall Tour Méditerranéen
8th Züri-Metzgete
8th Coppa Sabatini
1999 (5)
1st Overall Giro della Provincia di Lucca

1st Stage 1

1st Stage 4 Tirreno–Adriatico
2nd Milano–Torino
3rd Overall Settimana Internazionale di Coppi e Bartali

1st Stage 2

4th Züri-Metzgete
5th Liège–Bastogne–Liège
6th Overall Tour of Galicia

1st Stage 1

7th GP Ouest–France
7th Giro dell'Appennino
9th Giro di Lombardia
9th Grand Prix of Aargau Canton
2000 (6)
1st Overall Memorial Cecchi Gori

1st Stages 2 & 4

1st Liège–Bastogne–Liège
1st Trofeo Manacor
1st Stage 9 Tour de France
2nd Giro della Romagna
4th Clásica de San Sebastián
4th Paris–Tours
5th Coppa Placci
7th Grand Prix de Fourmies
7th Giro della Provincia di Siracusa
9th Road race, Olympic Games
9th Road race, UCI Road World Championships
10th Giro di Lombardia
10th Trofeo Pantalica
10th GP Industria & Artigianato di Larciano
2001 (5)
1st Züri-Metzgete
1st Coppa Placci
2nd Overall Tour de Langkawi

1st Points classification
1st Stages 3 & 11

2nd Road race, UCI Road World Championships
3rd Coppa Sabatini
4th Overall Giro della Provincia di Lucca

1st Stage 4

5th Milan–San Remo
5th Tre Valli Varesine
5th Giro del Lazio
6th HEW Cyclassics
9th Firenze–Pistoia
2002 (10)
1st Overall UCI Road World Cup
1st Overall Tour de Wallonie

1st Stage 1

1st Overall Giro Riviera Ligure Pomente

1st Stage 3 & 4

1st Liège–Bastogne–Liège
1st Coppa Sabatini
1st Giro del Lazio
1st Stage 1 Tour Méditerranéen
1st Stage 3 Giro della Provincia di Lucca
2nd Züri-Metzgete
2nd Giro di Toscana
4th Overall Tirreno–Adriatico

1st Stage 2

4th E3 Prijs Vlaanderen
4th HEW Cyclassics
5th Omloop Het Volk
6th Gran Premio Industria e Commercio di Prato
7th Clásica de San Sebastián
7th Firenze–Pistoia
8th Amstel Gold Race
8th Trofeo Laigueglia
10th Coppa Placci
2003 (5)
1st Overall UCI Road World Cup
1st Road race, National Road Championships
1st Overall Tour Méditerranéen

1st Points classification

1st Milan–San Remo
1st Clásica de San Sebastián
1st HEW Cyclassics
2nd Grand Prix of Aargau Canton
3rd Omloop Het Volk
3rd Züri-Metzgete
4th Road race, UCI Road World Championships
4th Trofeo Laigueglia
4th Gran Premio della Costa Etruschi
4th Trofeo Alcúdia
5th Overall Tirreno–Adriatico

1st Points classification

5th Tour du Haut Var
5th Gran Premio Città di Camaiore
5th Trofeo Manacor
8th Giro dell'Emilia
2004 (8)
1st Overall UCI Road World Cup
1st Road race, Olympic Games
1st Overall Tirreno–Adriatico

1st Stage 4 & 6

1st Gran Premio Città di Camaiore
1st Stage 8 Tour de Suisse
2nd Clásica de San Sebastián
2nd HEW Cyclassics
2nd Kuurne–Brussels–Kuurne
2nd Züri-Metzgete
3rd Amstel Gold Race
5th Paris–Brussels
5th Trofeo Palma de Mallorca
6th Overall Tour Méditerranéen

1st Stage 2

6th Paris–Tours
8th Milan–San Remo
8th Ronde van Midden-Zeeland
9th Overall Circuit Franco-Belge

1st Stage 1

9th Tour of Flanders
2005 (4)
1st Giro di Lombardia
1st Züri–Metzgete
Giro d'Italia

1st Points classification
1st Stage 1

1st Stage 16 Vuelta a España
2nd Gran Premio Bruno Beghelli
4th Liège–Bastogne–Liège
7th Trofeo Palma de Mallorca
2006 (9)
1st Road race, UCI Road World Championships
1st Road race, National Road Championships
1st Giro di Lombardia
1st Gran Premio di Lugano
1st Trofeo Sóller
Giro d'Italia

1st Points classification
1st Stage 15

1st Stage 2 Vuelta a España
Tirreno–Adriatico

1st Stage 1 & 2

2nd Liège–Bastogne–Liège
3rd Trofeo Pollença
3rd Trofeo Cala Millor
7th Tour of Flanders
8th Amstel Gold Race
9th Trofeo Laigueglia
9th Trofeo Palma de Mallorca
2007 (3)
1st Road race, UCI Road World Championships
1st Stage 3 Vuelta a España
1st Stage 4 Tour of California
4th Liège–Bastogne–Liège
6th Amstel Gold Race
7th Vattenfall Cyclassics
7th Firenze–Pistoia
2008 (5)
1st Trofeo Matteotti
Vuelta a España

1st Stage 6 & 12

1st Stage 1 Tour of Austria
3rd Overall Tour de Wallonie

1st Stage 2

4th Clásica de San Sebastián
9th Liège–Bastogne–Liège

=== Grand Tour general classification results timeline ===
Grand Tour	1997	1998	1999	2000	2001	2002	2003	2004	2005	2006	2007	2008
Giro d'Italia	25	7	44	—	—	DNF	—	—	38	56	41	19
Tour de France	—	—	—	122	74	—	114	114	—	—	—	—
Vuelta a España	—	—	32	—	—	—	—	—	DNF	DNF	DNF	DNF

=== Classics results timeline ===
Monument	1997	1998	1999	2000	2001	2002	2003	2004	2005	2006	2007	2008
Milan–San Remo	—	70	77	40	5	50	1	8	42	75	33	102
Tour of Flanders	—	—	—	—	23	16	DNF	9	—	7	21	—
Paris–Roubaix	Did not contest during his career											
Liège–Bastogne–Liège	—	92	5	1	15	1	—	22	4	2	4	9
Giro di Lombardia	—	21	9	10	20	30	DNF	29	1	1	103	—
Classic	1997	1998	1999	2000	2001	2002	2003	2004	2005	2006	2007	2008
Omloop Het Volk	—	—	—	—	—	5	3	—	DNF	—	—	90
Kuurne–Brussels–Kuurne	—	—	—	—	—	11	25	2	DNF	—	—	DNF
E3 Prijs Vlaanderen	—	—	—	—	—	4	DNF	48	—	—	24	—
Amstel Gold Race	—	DNF	32	14	DNF	8	—	3	37	8	7	—
La Flèche Wallonne	—	50	—	19	20	37	—	DNF	41	12	DNF	—
Clásica de San Sebastián	—	DNF	11	4	13	7	1	2	DNF	101	—	4
Hamburg Cyclassics	—	12	12	18	6	4	1	2	DNF	48	7	—
Züri-Metzgete	41	8	4	25	1	2	3	2	1	DNF	Not held	
GP Ouest-France	—	—	7	—	—	28	—	—	—	—	—	—
Giro dell'Emilia	—	—	—	—	—	—	8	—	DNF	—	DNF	—
Milano–Torino	—	21	2	NH	—	—	—	—	—	—	88	NH
Paris–Tours	—	47	14	4	—	19	11	6	—	—	—	—

=== Major championships results timeline ===
	1998	1999	2000	2001	2002	2003	2004	2005	2006	2007	2008
Olympic Games	Not held		9	Not held			1	Not held			17
World Championships	63	—	9	2	26	4	DNF	13	1	1	28
National Championships	—	—	7	15	—	1	11	—	1	DNF	27

Legend
—	Did not compete
DNF	Did not finish

== See also ==
- Italian men gold medalist at the Olympics and World Championships
