= 2006 UCI ProTour =

- Second edition of the UCI ProTour

Details
- Dates: March 5 – October 14
- Location: Europe
- Races: 27

Champions
- Individual champion: Alejandro Valverde (ESP) (Caisse d'Epargne–Illes Balears)
- Teams' champion: Team CSC
- Nations' champion: Spain

The 2006 UCI ProTour was the second year of the UCI ProTour system, in which the ProTour teams are guaranteed, and obliged to, participate in the series of ProTour races.

The prelude to the 2006 ProTour was dominated by a dispute between the managers of the Grand Tours and UCI, which meant that the Grand Tours were initially not to be a part of the 2006 ProTour. On April 7, 2006, an agreement to the dispute between the Grand Tours organisers and the Union Cycliste Internationale was reached , guaranteeing the future of the ProTour.

== 2006 ProTour races ==
| Date | Race | Country | Winner | Team |
|---|---|---|---|---|
| March 5–12 | Paris–Nice | France | Floyd Landis (USA) | Phonak |
| March 8–14 | Tirreno–Adriatico | Italy | Thomas Dekker (NED) | Rabobank |
| March 18 | Milan – San Remo | Italy | Filippo Pozzato (ITA) | Quick-Step–Innergetic |
| April 2 | Tour of Flanders | Belgium | Tom Boonen (BEL) | Quick-Step–Innergetic |
| April 3–8 | Vuelta al País Vasco | Spain | José Ángel Gómez Marchante (ESP) | Saunier Duval–Prodir |
| April 5 | Gent–Wevelgem | Belgium | Thor Hushovd (NOR) | Crédit Agricole |
| April 9 | Paris–Roubaix | France | Fabian Cancellara (SUI) | Team CSC |
| April 16 | Amstel Gold Race | Netherlands | Fränk Schleck (LUX) | Team CSC |
| April 19 | La Flèche Wallonne | Belgium | Alejandro Valverde (ESP) | Caisse d'Epargne–Illes Balears |
| April 23 | Liège–Bastogne–Liège | Belgium | Alejandro Valverde (ESP) | Caisse d'Epargne–Illes Balears |
| April 25–30 | Tour de Romandie | Switzerland | Cadel Evans (AUS) | Davitamon–Lotto |
| May 6–28 | Giro d'Italia | Italy | Ivan Basso (ITA) | Team CSC |
| May 15–21 | Volta a Catalunya | Spain | David Cañada (ESP) | Saunier Duval–Prodir |
| June 4–11 | Critérium du Dauphiné Libéré | France | Levi Leipheimer (USA) | Gerolsteiner |
| June 10–18 | Tour de Suisse | Switzerland | Jan Ullrich (GER) | T-Mobile Team |
| June 18 | Eindhoven Team Time Trial | Netherlands | team event | Team CSC |
| July 1–23 | Tour de France | France | Óscar Pereiro (ESP) | Caisse d'Epargne–Illes Balears |
| July 30 | Vattenfall Cyclassics | Germany | Óscar Freire (ESP) | Rabobank |
| August 1–9 | Deutschland Tour | Germany | Jens Voigt (GER) | Team CSC |
| August 12 | Clásica de San Sebastián | Spain | Xavier Florencio (ESP) | Bouygues Télécom |
| August 16–23 | Eneco Tour of Benelux | Belgium; Netherlands | Stefan Schumacher (GER) | Gerolsteiner |
| August 27 | GP Ouest-France | France | Vincenzo Nibali (ITA) | Liquigas |
| August 28 – September 19 | Vuelta a España | Spain | Alexander Vinokourov (KAZ) | Astana |
| September 4–10 | Tour de Pologne | Poland | Stefan Schumacher (GER) | Gerolsteiner |
| October 1 | Züri-Metzgete | Switzerland | Samuel Sánchez (ESP) | Euskaltel–Euskadi |
| October 8 | Paris–Tours | France | Frédéric Guesdon (FRA) | Française des Jeux |
| October 14 | Giro di Lombardia | Italy | Paolo Bettini (ITA) | Quick-Step–Innergetic |

== Final individual standings ==
| | Name | Team | Points |
|---|---|---|---|
| 1 | Alejandro Valverde (ESP) | Caisse d'Epargne–Illes Balears | 285 |
| 2 | Samuel Sánchez (ESP) | Euskaltel–Euskadi | 213 |
| 3 | Fränk Schleck (LUX) | Team CSC | 165 |
| 4 | Cadel Evans (AUS) | Davitamon–Lotto | 162 |
| 5 | Andrey Kashechkin (KAZ) | Astana | 156 |
| 6 | Alessandro Ballan (ITA) | Lampre–Fondital | 155 |
| 7 | Tom Boonen (BEL) | Quick-Step–Innergetic | 154 |
| 8 | Paolo Bettini (ITA) | Quick-Step–Innergetic | 144 |
| 9 | Ivan Basso (ITA) | Team CSC | 138 |
| 10 | Stefan Schumacher (GER) | Gerolsteiner | 133 |

- A total of 209 riders were classified
- Floyd Landis had 175 points before the UCI removed his name from the standings following his removal from the Phonak team.

== Final team standings ==
| | Team | Nationality | Points |
|---|---|---|---|
| 1 | Team CSC | Denmark | 388 |
| 2 | Caisse d'Epargne–Illes Balears | Spain | 350 |
| 3 | Rabobank | Netherlands | 346 |
| 4 | Discovery Channel | United States | 327 |
| 5 | Lampre–Fondital | Italy | 327 |
| 6 | Gerolsteiner | Germany | 294 |
| 7 | Phonak | Switzerland | 270 |
| 8 | T-Mobile Team | Germany | 269 |
| 9 | Saunier Duval–Prodir | Spain | 268 |
| 10 | Astana | Spain | 258 |
| 11 | Crédit Agricole | France | 253 |
| 12 | Cofidis | France | 249 |
| 13 | Quick-Step–Innergetic | Belgium | 248 |
| 14 | Liquigas | Italy | 247 |
| 15 | AG2R Prévoyance | France | 219 |
| 16 | Davitamon–Lotto | Belgium | 214 |
| 17 | Euskaltel–Euskadi | Spain | 208 |
| 18 | Team Milram | Italy | 185 |
| 19 | Bouygues Télécom | France | 184 |
| 20 | Française des Jeux | France | 173 |

== Final nation standings ==
| | Nation | Points |
|---|---|---|
| 1 | Spain | 808 |
| 2 | Italy | 651 |
| 3 | Germany | 475 |
| 4 | Australia | 340 |
| 5 | United States | 316 |
| 6 | Belgium | 292 |
| 7 | Kazakhstan | 286 |
| 8 | France | 271 |
| 8 | Netherlands | 269 |
| 10 | Russia | 234 |
| 11 | Switzerland | 190 |
| 12 | Luxembourg | 165 |

- Riders from 29 nations scored at least one UCI ProTour point.

== 2006 ProTour Points System ==
| | Tour de France | Giro d'Italia Vuelta a España | Milan – San Remo Tour of Flanders Paris–Roubaix Liège–Bastogne–Liège Giro di Lombardia Lesser stageraces | Lesser one-day races |
|---|---|---|---|---|
Overall Classification
| 1 | 100 | 85 | 50 | 40 |
| 2 | 75 | 65 | 40 | 30 |
| 3 | 60 | 50 | 35 | 25 |
| 4 | 55 | 45 | 30 | 20 |
| 5 | 50 | 40 | 25 | 15 |
| 6 | 45 | 35 | 20 | 11 |
| 7 | 40 | 30 | 15 | 7 |
| 8 | 35 | 26 | 10 | 5 |
| 9 | 30 | 22 | 5 | 3 |
| 10 | 25 | 19 | 2 | 1 |
| 11 | 20 | 16 | | |
| 12 | 15 | 13 | | |
| 13 | 12 | 11 | | |
| 14 | 10 | 9 | | |
| 15 | 8 | 7 | | |
| 16 | 6 | 5 | | |
| 17 | 5 | 4 | | |
| 18 | 4 | 3 | | |
| 19 | 3 | 2 | | |
| 20 | 2 | 1 | | |
Stage wins (if applicable)
| 1 | 10 | 8 | 3 | |
| 2 | 5 | 4 | 2 | |
| 3 | 3 | 2 | 1 | |

- If a rider is not part of UCI ProTour, no points are given. The points corresponding to the place are not awarded
- Top 20 teams get points in scale 20-19-18...-1.
- Team time trial doesn't give points for riders.
- In country ranking, top 5 riders of each country count towards the ranking.
