= 2009 Grote Prijs Jef Scherens =

Race details
- Dates: 6 September 2009
- Stages: 1
- Distance: 183 km (113.7 mi)
- Winning time: 4h 16' 35"

Results
	Winner	Sebastian Langeveld (NED)
	Second	Stijn Vandenbergh (BEL)
	Third	Frédéric Amorison (BEL)

The 2009 Grote Prijs Jef Scherens was the 43rd edition of the Grote Prijs Jef Scherens cycle race and was held on 6 September 2009. The race started and finished in Leuven. The race was won by Sebastian Langeveld.

== General classification ==
Final general classification

Rank	Rider	Time
1	Sebastian Langeveld (NED)	4h 16' 35"
2	Stijn Vandenbergh (BEL)	+ 0"
3	Frédéric Amorison (BEL)	+ 0"
4	Sylvain Chavanel (FRA)	+ 4"
5	Nick Nuyens (BEL)	+ 12"
6	Greg Van Avermaet (BEL)	+ 18"
7	Maxime Vantomme (BEL)	+ 18"
8	Gerben Löwik (NED)	+ 18"
9	Fabian Wegmann (GER)	+ 18"
10	Bert De Waele (BEL)	+ 18"
