= 2002 Tour de la Région Wallonne =

Race details
- Dates: 29 July–2 August 2002
- Stages: 5
- Winning time: 19h 32' 38"

Results
	Winner	Paolo Bettini (ITA)
	Second	Luca Paolini (ITA)
	Third	Daniele Nardello (ITA)

The 2002 Tour de la Région Wallonne was the 29th edition of the Tour de Wallonie cycle race and was held from 29 July to 2 August 2002. The race started in Chaudfontaine and finished in Flobecq. The race was won by Paolo Bettini.

== General classification ==
Final general classification

Rank	Rider	Time
1	Paolo Bettini (ITA)	19h 32' 38"
2	Luca Paolini (ITA)	+ 5"
3	Daniele Nardello (ITA)	+ 6"
4	Björn Leukemans (BEL)	+ 9"
5	Janek Tombak (EST)	+ 11"
6	Yaroslav Popovych (UKR)	+ 14"
7	Andrey Kashechkin (KAZ)	+ 15"
8	Peter Van Petegem (BEL)	+ 16"
9	Stephan Schreck (GER)	+ 17"
10	Christophe Stevens (BEL)	+ 18"
