= 2001 Tour du Haut Var =

Race details
- Dates: 24 February 2001
- Stages: 1
- Distance: 180 km (111.8 mi)
- Winning time: 4h 29' 03"

Results
	Winner	Daniele Nardello (ITA)
	Second	Nicolaj Bo Larsen (DEN)
	Third	Davide Rebellin (ITA)

The 2001 Tour du Haut Var was the 33rd edition of the Tour du Haut Var cycle race and was held on 24 February 2001. The race started and finished in Draguignan. The race was won by Daniele Nardello.

== General classification ==
Final general classification

Rank	Rider	Time
1	Daniele Nardello (ITA)	4h 29' 03"
2	Nicolaj Bo Larsen (DEN)	+ 0"
3	Davide Rebellin (ITA)	+ 0"
4	Mario Aerts (BEL)	+ 3"
5	Gianluca Bortolami (ITA)	+ 31"
6	Fabien De Waele (BEL)	+ 31"
7	Fabrice Salanson (FRA)	+ 31"
8	Sandy Casar (FRA)	+ 31"
9	Serge Baguet (BEL)	+ 1' 29"
10	Florent Brard (FRA)	+ 1' 29"
