= 2002 HEW Cyclassics =

Race details
- Dates: 4 August 2002
- Stages: 1
- Distance: 253.2 km (157.3 mi)
- Winning time: 5h 43' 35"

Results
	Winner	Johan Museeuw (BEL)
	Second	Igor Astarloa (ESP)
	Third	Davide Rebellin (ITA)

The 2002 HEW Cyclassics was the seventh edition of the HEW Cyclassics cycle race and was held on 4 August 2002. The race started and finished in Hamburg. The race was won by Johan Museeuw.

== General classification ==
Final general classification

	Cyclist	Team	Time
1	Johan Museeuw (BEL)	Domo–Farm Frites	5h 43' 35"
2	Igor Astarloa (ESP)	Saeco–Longoni Sport	s.t.
3	Davide Rebellin (ITA)	Gerolsteiner	s.t.
~~4~~	Paolo Bettini (ITA)	Mapei–Quick-Step	s.t.
5	George Hincapie (USA)	U.S. Postal Service	s.t.
6	Fabio Baldato (ITA)	Fassa Bortolo	s.t.
7	Cristian Moreni (ITA)	Alessio	s.t.
8	Andrea Ferrigato (ITA)	Alessio	+ 2"
9	Danilo Di Luca (ITA)	Saeco–Longoni Sport	+ 3"
10	Romāns Vainšteins (LAT)	Domo–Farm Frites	+ 12"
