= 1999 Giro di Lombardia =

Race details
- Dates: 16 October 1999
- Stages: 1
- Distance: 262 km (162.8 mi)
- Winning time: 6h 21' 50"

Results
| | Winner | Mirko Celestino (ITA) | (Team Polti) |
| | Second | Danilo Di Luca (ITA) | (Cantina Tollo–Alexia Alluminio) |
| | Third | Eddy Mazzoleni (ITA) | (Saeco–Cannondale) |

The 1999 Giro di Lombardia was the 93rd edition of the Giro di Lombardia cycle race and was held on 16 October 1999. The race started in Varese and finished in Bergamo. The race was won by Mirko Celestino of the Polti team.

== General classification ==
Final general classification

| Rank | Rider | Team | Time |
|---|---|---|---|
| 1 | Mirko Celestino (ITA) | Team Polti | 6h 21' 50" |
| 2 | Danilo Di Luca (ITA) | Cantina Tollo–Alexia Alluminio | + 0" |
| 3 | Eddy Mazzoleni (ITA) | Saeco–Cannondale | + 0" |
| 4 | Oscar Camenzind (SUI) | Lampre–Daikin | + 2" |
| 5 | Dimitri Konyshev (RUS) | Mercatone Uno–Bianchi | + 2" |
| 6 | Markus Zberg (SUI) | Rabobank | + 11" |
| 7 | Marco Serpellini (ITA) | Lampre–Daikin | + 11" |
| 8 | Marco Velo (ITA) | Mercatone Uno–Bianchi | + 11" |
| 9 | Paolo Bettini (ITA) | Mapei–Quick-Step | + 11" |
| 10 | Christophe Moreau (FRA) | Festina–Lotus | + 11" |
