= 2006 GP Ouest-France =

2006 UCI ProTour, race 22 of 27

Race details
- Dates: August 27, 2006
- Stages: 1
- Distance: 226 km (140.4 mi)
- Winning time: 5h 18' 56"

Results
	Winner	Vincenzo Nibali (ITA)	(Liquigas)
	Second	Juan Antonio Flecha (ESP)	(Rabobank)
	Third	Manuele Mori (ITA)	(Saunier Duval–Prodir)

The 2006 GP Ouest-France, the 70th edition of the GP Ouest-France, took place on August 27, 2006 in the French region of Brittany, in a race in and around the village of Plouay.

Previously unheralded Vincenzo Nibali stunned the field with his victory, outsprinting Juan Antonio Flecha to take his first major win.

== General Standings ==
Final general classification

Rank	Rider	Team	Time
1	Vincenzo Nibali (ITA)	Liquigas	5h 18' 56"
2	Juan Antonio Flecha (ESP)	Rabobank	s.t.
3	Manuele Mori (ITA)	Saunier Duval–Prodir	s.t.
4	Yaroslav Popovych (UKR)	Discovery Channel	+ 5"
5	Jakob Piil (DEN)	Team CSC	+ 18"
6	Filippo Pozzato (ITA)	Quick-Step–Innergetic	+ 18"
7	Pierrick Fédrigo (FRA)	Bouygues Télécom	+ 18"
8	Sergei Ivanov (RUS)	T-Mobile Team	+ 18"
9	Grégory Rast (SUI)	Phonak	+ 18"
10	Fabian Wegmann (GER)	Gerolsteiner	+ 18"
