= 1999 GP Ouest-France =

Race details
- Dates: 29 August 1999
- Stages: 1
- Distance: 209 km (129.9 mi)
- Winning time: 4h 46' 26"

Results
| | Winner | Christophe Mengin (FRA) | (Française des Jeux) |
| | Second | Markus Zberg (SUI) | (Rabobank) |
| | Third | Sergei Ivanov (RUS) | (TVM–Farm Frites) |

The 1999 GP Ouest-France was the 63rd edition of the GP Ouest-France cycle race and was held on 29 August 1999. The race started and finished in Plouay. The race was won by Christophe Mengin of the Française des Jeux team.

== General classification ==
Final general classification

| Rank | Rider | Team | Time |
|---|---|---|---|
| 1 | Christophe Mengin (FRA) | Française des Jeux | 4h 46' 26" |
| 2 | Markus Zberg (SUI) | Rabobank | + 0" |
| 3 | Sergei Ivanov (RUS) | TVM–Farm Frites | + 6" |
| 4 | Alberto Elli (ITA) | Team Telekom | + 6" |
| 5 | Lauri Aus (EST) | Casino–Ag2r Prévoyance | + 6" |
| 6 | Andrei Tchmil (BEL) | Lotto–Mobistar | + 6" |
| 7 | Paolo Bettini (ITA) | Mapei–Quick-Step | + 6" |
| 8 | Cédric Vasseur (FRA) | Crédit Agricole | + 6" |
| 9 | Frank Vandenbroucke (BEL) | Cofidis | + 6" |
| 10 | Geert Verheyen (BEL) | Lotto–Mobistar | + 6" |
