= 2005 Züri-Metzgete =

These are the results for the 2005 edition of the Züri-Metzgete race, won by Paolo Bettini after a long breakaway under the rain.

== General Standings ==
=== 02-10-2005: Zürich, 241 km. ===
	Cyclist	Team	Time
1	Paolo Bettini (ITA)	Quick-Step–Innergetic	6h 06' 22"
2	Fränk Schleck (LUX)	Team CSC	+ 2' 57"
3	Lorenzo Bernucci (ITA)	Fassa Bortolo	+ 2' 57"
4	Danilo Di Luca (ITA)	Liquigas–Bianchi	+ 3' 10"
5	Samuel Sánchez (ESP)	Euskaltel–Euskadi	+ 3' 10"
6	Steffen Wesemann (SUI)	T-Mobile Team	+ 3' 35"
7	Heinrich Haussler (GER)	Gerolsteiner	+ 3' 39"
8	Thomas Lövkvist (SWE)	Française des Jeux	+ 3' 41"
9	Mirko Celestino (ITA)	Domina Vacanze	+ 3' 57"
10	Vladimir Miholjević (CRO)	Liquigas–Bianchi	+ 3' 57"

Preceded by 2004	Züri-Metzgete	Succeeded by 2006
