= Massimo Codol =

Italian cyclist

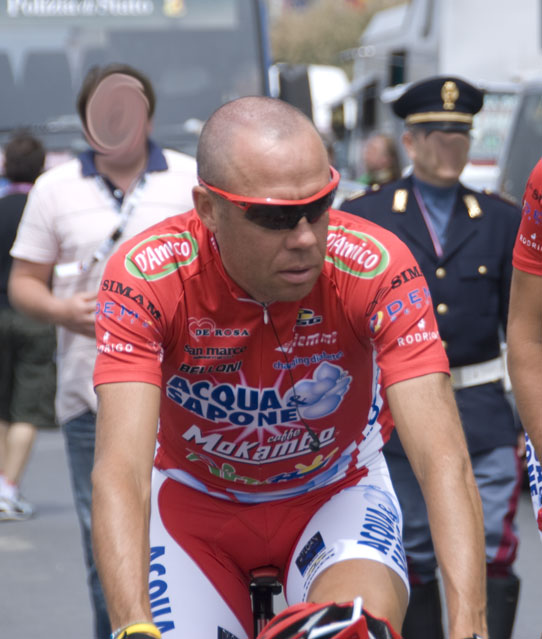
- Codol in 2009

Personal information
- Full name: Massimo Codol
- Born: 27 February 1973 (age 53) Lecco, Italy

Cycling career
- Sport: Cycling
- Current team: D'Amico–UM Tools
- Discipline: Road
- Role: Rider (retired); Directeur sportif

Professional teams
- 1998: Mapei–Bricobi
- 1999–2002: Lampre–Daikin
- 2003: Mercatone Uno–Scanavino
- 2004–2005: Fassa Bortolo
- 2006: Tenax
- 2007–2012: Acqua & Sapone–Caffè Mokambo
- 2014: Area Zero Pro Team

Managerial team
- 2014–: Area Zero Pro Team

Massimo Codol (born 27 February 1973) is an Italian former racing cyclist, who currently works as a directeur sportif for UCI Continental team D'Amico–UM Tools.

== Major results ==
2000
1st Japan Cup Cycle Road Race
1st Stage 1 Tour of the Basque Country
2nd Giro dell'Emilia
8th Giro di Lombardia
2001
10th Japan Cup Cycle Road Race
2002
5th Liège–Bastogne–Liège
6th Japan Cup Cycle Road Race
10th Overall Giro del Trentino
2005
8th Overall Settimana Ciclistica Internazionale Coppi-Bartali
2008
3rd Overall Clásica Internacional de Alcobendas
4th Overall Settimana Ciclista Lombarda
7th Overall GP Internacional Paredes Rota dos Móveis
2010
10th Overall Tour de Wallonie
