= 2002 E3 Prijs Vlaanderen =

Race details
- Dates: 30 March 2002
- Stages: 1
- Distance: 209 km (130 mi)
- Winning time: 4h 45' 00"

Results
	Winner	Dario Pieri (ITA)	(Alessio)
	Second	Jo Planckaert (BEL)	(Cofidis)
	Third	Johan Museeuw (BEL)	(Domo–Farm Frites)

The 2002 E3 Prijs Vlaanderen was the 45th edition of the E3 Prijs Vlaanderen cycle race and was held on 30 March 2002. The race started and finished in Harelbeke. The race was won by Dario Pieri of the Alessio team.

== General classification ==
Final general classification

Rank	Rider	Team	Time
1	Dario Pieri (ITA)	Alessio	4h 45' 00"
2	Jo Planckaert (BEL)	Cofidis	+ 0"
3	Johan Museeuw (BEL)	Domo–Farm Frites	+ 27"
4	Paolo Bettini (ITA)	Mapei–Quick-Step	+ 27"
5	Peter Van Petegem (BEL)	Lotto–Adecco	+ 28"
6	Peter Farazijn (BEL)	Cofidis	+ 28"
7	Martin Hvastija (SLO)	Alessio	+ 39"
8	Steffen Wesemann (SUI)	Team Telekom	+ 39"
9	Fred Rodriguez (USA)	Domo–Farm Frites	+ 39"
10	Chris Peers (BEL)	Cofidis	+ 39"
