= Fabrice Salanson =

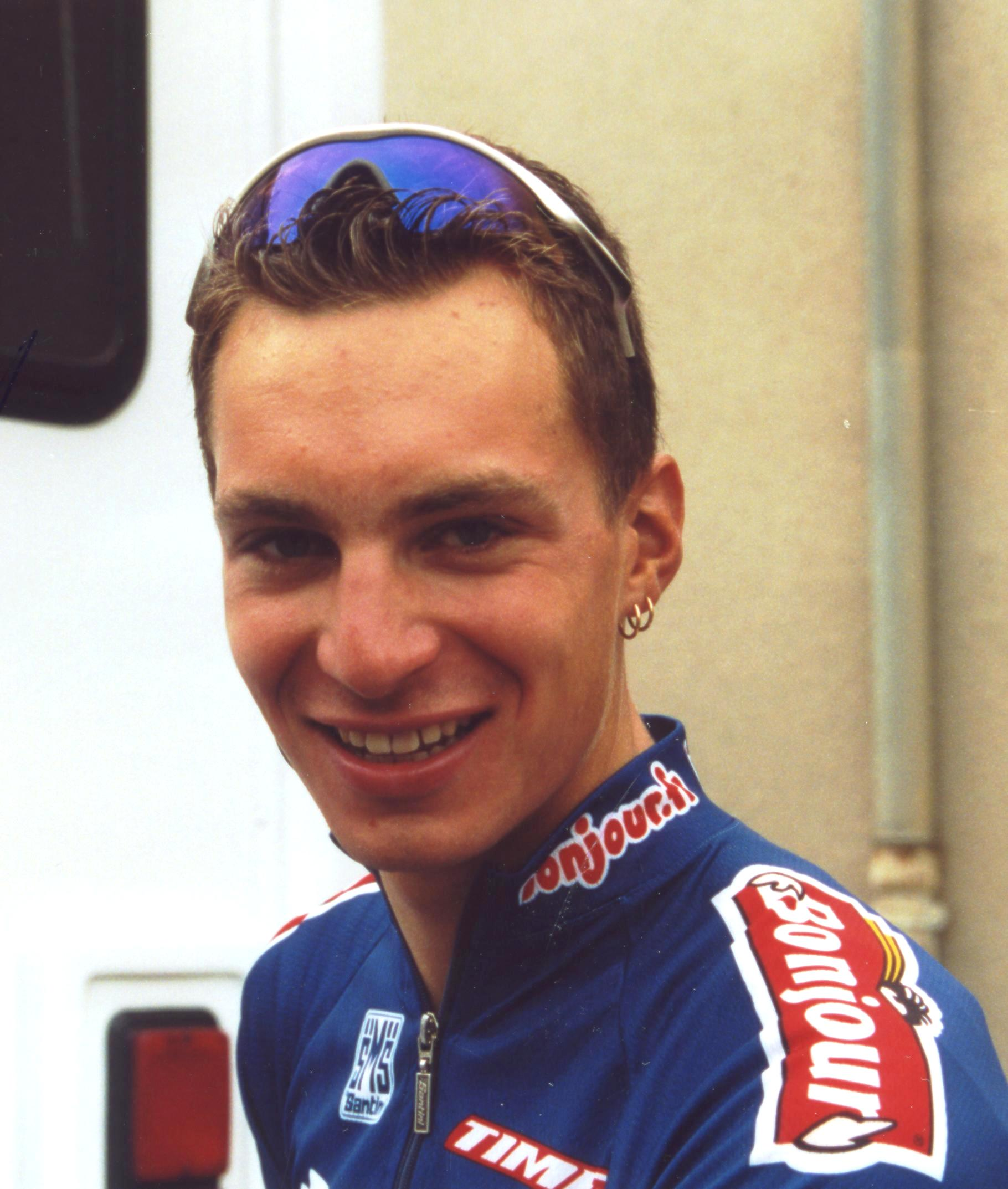
- Fabrice Salanson at the 2001 Tour de l'Avenir

Personal information
- Born: 17 November 1979 Montereau-Fault-Yonne, France
- Died: 3 June 2003 (aged 23) Dresden, Germany

Cycling career
- Sport: Cycling
- Discipline: Road
- Role: Rider

Amateur team
- 1998–1999: Vendée U

Professional team
- 2000–2003: Bonjour

Fabrice Salanson (17 November 1979 – 3 June 2003) was a French road cyclist. He was considered to be a very promising talent before his death in 2003.

During his short career, he most notably won a stage of the 2002 Grand Prix du Midi Libre and a stage of the 2000 Tour de l'Avenir. He also rode in the 2001 Giro d'Italia, but did not finish.

== Death ==
On 3 June 2003 he was found dead next to his bed in his hotel in Dresden the morning before the Tour of Germany. The race was still held, but his team, Brioches La Boulangère, chose not to race.

Forensics revealed that Salanson died of a heart attack. No indications of doping were found. However, an electrocardiogram from three weeks before Salanson's death later surfaced, showing an interruption during a strenuous test of maximum effort. While this was abnormal, it did not explain his death.

== Major results ==
1997
1st Chrono des Nations Juniors
1st La Bernaudeau Junior
1999
8th Paris–Roubaix Espoirs
2000
1st Stage 3 Tour de l'Avenir
7th Grand Prix de Villers-Cotterêts
2001
7th Tour du Haut Var
2002
1st Stage 2 Grand Prix du Midi Libre
2003
4th A Travers le Morbihan
