= 2006 Giro di Lombardia =

2006 UCI ProTour, race 27 of 27

Race details
- Dates: 14 October 2006
- Stages: 1
- Distance: 245 km (152.2 mi)
- Winning time: 6h 08' 06"

Results
	Winner	Paolo Bettini (ITA)	(Quick-Step–Innergetic)
	Second	Samuel Sánchez (ESP)	(Euskaltel–Euskadi)
	Third	Fabian Wegmann (GER)	(Gerolsteiner)

In 2006, the 100th edition of the Giro di Lombardia cycling race took place on 14 October, in and around the Italian region of Lombardy. It was won by World Champion Paolo Bettini who dedicated the victory to his brother who had recently died.

This race marked the end of the 2006 UCI ProTour calendar, with Alejandro Valverde taking the overall title and setting a new record for most ProTour points amassed in one season.

== General Standings ==
=== 14 October 2006: Mendrisio-Como, 246 km (153 mi) ===
	Cyclist	Team	Time	UCI ProTour Points
1	Paolo Bettini (ITA)	Quick-Step–Innergetic	6h 08' 06"	50 pts.
2	Samuel Sánchez (ESP)	Euskaltel–Euskadi	+ 8"	40 pts.
3	Fabian Wegmann (GER)	Gerolsteiner	+ 8"	35 pts.
4	Cristian Moreni (ITA)	Cofidis	+ 14"	30 pts.
5	Davide Rebellin (ITA)	Gerolsteiner	+ 46"	25 pts.
6	Matteo Carrara (ITA)	Lampre–Fondital	+ 46"	20 pts.
7	Fränk Schleck (LUX)	Team CSC	+ 46"	15 pts.
8	Michael Boogerd (NED)	Rabobank	+ 48"	10 pts.
9	Danilo Di Luca (ITA)	Liquigas	+ 2' 32"	5 pts.
10	Andrea Pagoto (ITA)	Ceramica Panaria–Navigare	+ 3' 53"	None*

- 10th-place finisher Andrea Pagoto does not ride on a UCI ProTour team and is ineligible for points.
