= 2006 Züri-Metzgete =

Cycle race in Zurich

The 2006 edition of the Züri-Metzgete cycling classic took place on October 1 in a circuit in and around the Swiss city of Zürich. It was part of the 2006 UCI ProTour, and won by Samuel Sánchez. It turned out to be the last running of the Züri-Metzgete race.

== General Standings ==
=== 2006-10-01: Zürich, 241 km. ===
	Cyclist	Team	Time	UCI ProTour Points
1	Samuel Sánchez (ESP)	Euskaltel–Euskadi	6h 03' 48"	40 pts.
2	Stuart O'Grady (AUS)	Team CSC	+ 30"	30 pts.
3	Davide Rebellin (ITA)	Gerolsteiner	+ 30"	25 pts.
4	Michael Boogerd (NED)	Rabobank	+ 30"	20 pts.
5	Fabian Cancellara (SUI)	Team CSC	+ 36"	15 pts.
6	Cristian Moreni (ITA)	Cofidis	+ 36"	11 pts.
7	Nicki Sørensen (DEN)	Team CSC	+ 36"	7 pts.
8	Vladimir Gusev (RUS)	Discovery Channel	+ 1' 17"	5 pts.
9	Danilo Di Luca (ITA)	Liquigas	+ 1' 20"	3 pts.
10	Filippo Pozzato (ITA)	Quick Step-Innergetic	+ 1' 20"	1 pt.

Preceded by 2005	Züri-Metzgete	Succeeded by –
