= 2004 Tirreno–Adriatico =

Race details
- Dates: 10–16 March 2004
- Stages: 7
- Distance: 1,228 km (763.0 mi)
- Winning time: 33h 47' 06"

Results
Jersey awarded to the overall winner	Winner	Paolo Bettini (ITA)	(Quick-Step–Davitamon)
	Second	Óscar Freire (ESP)	(Rabobank)
	Third	Erik Zabel (GER)	(T-Mobile Team)
	Points	Erik Zabel (GER)	(T-Mobile Team)
	Mountains	Rolf Aldag (GER)	(T-Mobile Team)

The 2004 Tirreno–Adriatico was the 39th edition of the Tirreno–Adriatico cycle race and was held from 10 March to 16 March 2004. The race started in Sabaudia and finished in San Benedetto del Tronto. The race was won by Paolo Bettini of the Quick-Step team.

== Teams ==
Twenty teams, containing a total of 160 riders, participated in the race:

- Fassa Bortolo
- Alessio–Bianchi
- Brioches La Boulangère
- Ceramica Panaria–Margres
- Cofidis
- Crédit Agricole
- De Nardi–Piemme Telekom
- Domina Vacanze
- Gerolsteiner
- Lampre
- Landbouwkrediet–Colnago
- Liberty Seguros
- Lotto–Domo
- Phonak
- Quick-Step–Davitamon
- Rabobank
- Saeco
- Saunier Duval–Prodir
- T-Mobile Team
- Vini Caldirola–Nobili Rubinetterie

== Route ==
Stage characteristics and winners
Stage	Date	Course	Distance	Type	Winner
1	10 March	Sabaudia to Sabaudia	172 km (107 mi)	Flat stage	Alessandro Petacchi (ITA)
2	11 March	Latina to Maddaloni	164 km (102 mi)	Flat stage	Alessandro Petacchi (ITA)
3	12 March	Maddaloni to Isernia	168 km (104 mi)	Hilly stage	Óscar Freire (ESP)
4	13 March	Isernia to Paglieta	179 km (111 mi)	Medium mountain stage	Paolo Bettini (ITA)
5	14 March	Paglieta to Torricella Sicura	215 km (134 mi)	Medium mountain stage	Roberto Petito (ITA)
6	15 March	Monte San Pietrangeli to Torre San Patrizio	185 km (115 mi)	Hilly stage	Paolo Bettini (ITA)
7	16 March	San Benedetto del Tronto to San Benedetto del Tronto	162 km (101 mi)	Hilly stage	Alessandro Petacchi (ITA)

== General classification ==
Final general classification

Rank	Rider	Team	Time
1	Paolo Bettini (ITA)	Quick-Step–Davitamon	33h 47' 06"
2	Óscar Freire (ESP)	Rabobank	+ 5"
3	Erik Zabel (GER)	T-Mobile Team	+ 11"
4	Igor Astarloa (ESP)	Cofidis	+ 18"
5	Stuart O'Grady (AUS)	Cofidis	+ 21"
6	Michael Boogerd (NED)	Rabobank	+ 22"
7	Rolf Aldag (GER)	T-Mobile Team	+ 26"
8	Giuliano Figueras (ITA)	Ceramica Panaria–Margres	+ 26"
9	Ángel Vicioso (ESP)	Liberty Seguros	+ 27"
10	Joaquim Rodríguez (ESP)	Saunier Duval–Prodir	+ 28"
