= 2003 Clásica de San Sebastián =

Race details
- Dates: 9 August 2003
- Stages: 1
- Distance: 227 km (141.1 mi)
- Winning time: 5h 44' 42"

Results
	Winner	Paolo Bettini (ITA)	(Quick-Step–Davitamon)
	Second	Ivan Basso (ITA)	(Fassa Bortolo)
	Third	Danilo Di Luca (ITA)	(Saeco)

The 2003 Clásica de San Sebastián was the 23rd edition of the Clásica de San Sebastián cycle race and was held on 9 August 2003. The race started and finished in San Sebastián. The race was won by Paolo Bettini of the Quick-Step team.

== General classification ==
Final general classification

Rank	Rider	Team	Time
1	Paolo Bettini (ITA)	Quick-Step–Davitamon	5h 44' 42"
2	Ivan Basso (ITA)	Fassa Bortolo	+ 0"
3	Danilo Di Luca (ITA)	Saeco	+ 20"
4	Francesco Casagrande (ITA)	Lampre	+ 20"
5	Andrea Noè (ITA)	Alessio	+ 23"
6	Gorka Gerrikagoitia (ESP)	Euskaltel–Euskadi	+ 33"
7	Davide Rebellin (ITA)	Gerolsteiner	+ 33"
8	Michael Boogerd (NED)	Rabobank	+ 34"
9	Michael Rasmussen (DEN)	Rabobank	+ 37"
10	Paolo Valoti (ITA)	De Nardi–Colpack	+ 1' 53"
