= 2006 Gent–Wevelgem =

2006 UCI ProTour, race 6 of 27

Race details
- Dates: 5 April 2006
- Stages: 1
- Distance: 210 km (130 mi)
- Winning time: 4h 53' 15"

Results
	Winner	Thor Hushovd (NOR)	(Crédit Agricole)
	Second	David Kopp (GER)	(Gerolsteiner)
	Third	Alessandro Petacchi (ITA)	(Team Milram)

The 2006 Gent–Wevelgem race was the 68th edition of the Belgian Gent–Wevelgem cycling classic. It was held on 5 April 2006, between Deinze and Wevelgem, and was won by Norwegian sprinter Thor Hushovd of the Crédit Agricole team.

== General standings ==
=== 05-04-2006: Gent–Wevelgem, 210km. ===
	Cyclist	Team	Time
1	Thor Hushovd (NOR)	Crédit Agricole	4h 53' 15"
2	David Kopp (GER)	Team Gerolsteiner	s.t.
3	Alessandro Petacchi (ITA)	Team Milram	s.t.
4	Filippo Pozzato (ITA)	Quick-Step–Innergetic	s.t.
5	George Hincapie (USA)	Discovery Channel	s.t.
6	Fabian Cancellara (SUI)	Team CSC	s.t.
7	Bernhard Eisel (AUT)	Française des Jeux	s.t.
8	Erki Pütsep (EST)	AG2R Prévoyance	s.t.
9	Allan Davis (AUS)	Liberty Seguros–Würth	s.t.
10	Kurt Asle Arvesen (NOR)	Team CSC	s.t.
