= 2005 Tour de Pologne =

Cycling race

These are the results for the 2005 edition of the Tour de Pologne cycling race. Despite getting four cyclists in the decisive break, Rabobank didn't manage to take the overall win from Kim Kirchen.

== Stages ==
=== 12-09-2005: Gdańsk-Elbląg, 149.6 km. ===
	Cyclist	Team	Time
1	Baden Cooke	Française des Jeux	3h 21' 23"
2	Luca Paolini	Quick-Step–Innergetic	s.t.
3	Francesco Chicchi	Fassa Bortolo	s.t.

=== 13-09-2005: Tczew-Olsztyn, 226.5 km. ===
	Cyclist	Team	Time
1	Daniele Bennati	Lampre–Caffita	5h 54' 37"
2	Luca Paolini	Quick-Step–Innergetic	s.t.
3	Francesco Chicchi	Fassa Bortolo	s.t.

=== 14-09-2005: Ostróda-Bydgoszcz, 212 km. ===
	Cyclist	Team	Time
1	Jaan Kirsipuu	Crédit Agricole	3h 38' 09"
2	Luca Paolini	Quick-Step–Innergetic	s.t.
3	Max van Heeswijk	Discovery Channel	s.t.

=== 15-09-2005: Inowrocław-Leszno, 213 km. ===
	Cyclist	Team	Time
1	Daniele Bennati	Lampre–Caffita	5h 22' 52"
2	Luca Paolini	Quick-Step–Innergetic	s.t.
3	Angelo Furlan	Domina Vacanze	s.t.

=== 16-09-2005: Wrocław-Szklarska Poręba, 212 km. ===
	Cyclist	Team	Time
1	Fabian Wegmann	Gerolsteiner	5h 28' 01"
2	Filippo Pozzato	Quick-Step–Innergetic	s.t.
3	Uroš Murn	Phonak	s.t.

=== 17-09-2005: Piechowice-Karpacz, 153 km. ===
	Cyclist	Team	Time
1	Pieter Weening	Rabobank	4h 16' 37"
2	Kim Kirchen	Fassa Bortolo	+ 4"
3	Thomas Dekker	Rabobank	+ 25"

=== 18-09-2005: Jelenia Góra-Karpacz, 61 km. ===
	Cyclist	Team	Time
1	Kim Kirchen	Fassa Bortolo	1h 39' 00"
2	Danilo Di Luca	Quick-Step–Innergetic	+ 2"
3	Thomas Lövkvist	Française des Jeux	+ 4"

=== 18-09-2005: Jelenia Góra-Karpacz, 19 km. (ITT) ===
	Cyclist	Team	Time
1	Thomas Dekker	Rabobank	30' 54"
2	Bobby Julich	Team CSC	+ 8"
3	Thomas Lövkvist	Française des Jeux	+ 8"

== General Standings ==
	Cyclist	Team	Time
1	Kim Kirchen	Fassa Bortolo	32h 11' 58"
2	Pieter Weening	Rabobank	+ 5"
3	Thomas Dekker	Rabobank	+ 11"
4	Thomas Lövkvist	Française des Jeux	+ 18"
5	Danilo Di Luca	Liquigas	+ 34"
6	Michael Boogerd	Rabobank	+ 1' 04"
7	Jan Hruška	Liberty Seguros–Würth	+ 2' 14"
8	Marek Rutkiewicz	Intel Action	+ 2' 43"
9	Sylvain Chavanel	Cofidis	+ 2' 52"
10	José Luis Rubiera	Discovery Channel	+ 3' 03"

== KOM Classification ==
	Cyclist	Team	Country
1	Bartosz Huzarski	Intel Action	Poland

== Points Classification ==
	Cyclist	Team	Country
1	Kim Kirchen	Fassa Bortolo	Luxembourg

== Sprints Classification ==
The sprints classification jersey is awarded to the rider with the most points awarded in the intermediate sprints.

	Cyclist	Team	Country
1	Robert Förster	Team Gerolsteiner	Germany

== Best Team ==
	Team
1	Rabobank
