= 2007 Amstel Gold Race =

Dutch cycling race

2007 UCI ProTour, race 8 of 26

Race details
- Dates: 22 April 2007
- Stages: 1
- Distance: 253 km (157.2 mi)
- Winning time: 6h 11' 49"

Results
	Winner	Stefan Schumacher (GER)	(Gerolsteiner)
	Second	Davide Rebellin (ITA)	(Gerolsteiner)
	Third	Danilo Di Luca (ITA)	(Liquigas)

The 2007 Amstel Gold Race cycling race took place on Sunday April 22. It was the 42nd edition of the annual road race in the Dutch province of Limburg.

Stefan Schumacher attacked just before final climb, and others could not catch him. Gerolsteiner got 1-2 after Davide Rebellin won the sprint for 2nd place. Rebellin took the lead of the season-long 2007 UCI ProTour series following his second place.

== General Standings ==
=== 2007-04-22: Maastricht-Valkenburg, 253.1 km ===
	Rider	Team	Time	UCI ProTour Points
1	Stefan Schumacher (GER)	Gerolsteiner	6h 11' 49"	40
2	Davide Rebellin (ITA)	Gerolsteiner	+ 21"	30
3	Danilo Di Luca (ITA)	Liquigas	+ 22"	25
4	Matthias Kessler (GER)	Astana	+ 23"	20
5	Michael Boogerd (NED)	Rabobank	+ 24"	15
6	Paolo Bettini (ITA)	Quick-Step–Innergetic	+ 27"	11
7	Alejandro Valverde (ESP)	Caisse d'Epargne	+ 27"	7
8	Óscar Freire (ESP)	Rabobank	+ 1' 07"	5
9	Riccardo Riccò (ITA)	Saunier Duval–Prodir	+ 1' 07"	3
10	Fränk Schleck (LUX)	Team CSC	+ 1' 07"	1
