= 2005 La Flèche Wallonne =

These are the results for the 2005 edition of La Flèche Wallonne cycling classic, won by Danilo Di Luca from Italy.

== General Standings ==
=== 20-04-2005: Charleroi-Huy, 201.5 km. ===
	Cyclist	Team	Time
1	Danilo Di Luca (ITA)	Liquigas–Bianchi	4h 44'55"
2	Kim Kirchen (LUX)	Fassa Bortolo	s.t.
3	Davide Rebellin (ITA)	Gerolsteiner	s.t.
4	David Etxebarría (ESP)	Liberty Seguros–Würth	+ 4"
5	Óscar Freire (ESP)	Rabobank	s.t.
6	Ángel Vicioso (ESP)	Liberty Seguros–Würth	s.t.
7	Patrik Sinkewitz (GER)	Quick-Step–Innergetic	s.t.
8	Aitor Osa (ESP)	Illes Balears-Caisse d'Epargne	s.t.
9	Cadel Evans (AUS)	Davitamon–Lotto	+ 8"
10	Fabian Wegmann (GER)	Gerolsteiner	s.t.
