= 2000 Liège–Bastogne–Liège =

Race details
- Dates: 16 April 2000
- Stages: 1
- Distance: 264 km (164 mi)
- Winning time: 6h 28' 32"

Results
	Winner	Paolo Bettini (ITA)	(Mapei–Quick-Step)
	Second	David Etxebarria (ESP)	(ONCE–Deutsche Bank)
	Third	Davide Rebellin (ITA)	(Liquigas–Pata)

The 2000 Liège–Bastogne–Liège was the 86th edition of the Liège–Bastogne–Liège cycle race and was held on 16 April 2000. The race started in Liège and finished in Ans. The race was won by Paolo Bettini of the Mapei team.

== General classification ==
Final general classification

Rank	Rider	Team	Time
1	Paolo Bettini (ITA)	Mapei–Quick-Step	6h 28' 32"
2	David Etxebarria (ESP)	ONCE–Deutsche Bank	+ 0"
3	Davide Rebellin (ITA)	Liquigas–Pata	+ 0"
4	Wladimir Belli (ITA)	Fassa Bortolo	+ 10"
5	Axel Merckx (BEL)	Mapei–Quick-Step	+ 12"
6	Mauro Gianetti (SUI)	Vini Caldirola–Sidermec	+ 30"
7	Alexander Vinokourov (KAZ)	Team Telekom	+ 33"
8	Maarten den Bakker (NED)	Rabobank	+ 40"
9	Francesco Casagrande (ITA)	Vini Caldirola–Sidermec	+ 44"
10	Laurent Jalabert (FRA)	ONCE–Deutsche Bank	+ 48"
