= 2006 Clásica de San Sebastián =

2006 UCI ProTour, race 20 of 27

Race details
- Dates: August 12, 2006
- Stages: 1
- Distance: 227 km (141 mi)
- Winning time: 5h 32' 45"

Results
	Winner	Xavier Florencio (ESP)	(Bouygues Télécom)
	Second	Stefano Garzelli (ITA)	(Liquigas)
	Third	Andrey Kashechkin (KAZ)	(Astana)

The 2006 edition of the Clásica de San Sebastián cycle race took place in the Basque city of San Sebastián on August 12, 2006. It was surprisingly won by little known Spanish cyclist Xavier Florencio of the Bouygues Télécom cycling team.

== General Standings ==
=== 12-08-2006: San Sebastián, 227 km. ===
	Cyclist	Team	Time
1	Xavier Florencio (ESP)	Bouygues Télécom	5h 32' 45"
2	Stefano Garzelli (ITA)	Liquigas	s.t.
3	Andrey Kashechkin (KAZ)	Astana	s.t.
4	Alexander Bocharov (RUS)	Crédit Agricole	s.t.
5	Cristian Moreni (ITA)	Cofidis	s.t.
6	Mirko Celestino (ITA)	Team Milram	s.t.
7	Ricardo Serrano (ESP)	Kaiku	s.t.
8	Alejandro Valverde (ESP)	Caisse d'Epargne–Illes Balears	s.t.
9	George Hincapie (USA)	Discovery Channel	s.t.
10	Franco Pellizotti (ITA)	Liquigas	s.t.
