= 2005 Giro di Lombardia =

Race details
- Dates: 15 October 2005
- Stages: 1
- Distance: 246 km (153 mi)
- Winning time: 5h 56' 22"

Results
| | Winner | Paolo Bettini (ITA) | (Quick-Step–Innergetic) |
| | Second | Gilberto Simoni (ITA) | (Lampre–Caffita) |
| | Third | Fränk Schleck (LUX) | (Team CSC) |

The 2005 Giro di Lombardia was the 99th edition of the cycling classic held on 15 October 2005, with Paolo Bettini winning the race.

== General Standings ==
=== 15 October 2005: Mendrisio – Como, 246 km (153 mi) ===
| | Cyclist | Team | Time |
|---|---|---|---|
| 1 | Paolo Bettini (ITA) | Quick-Step–Innergetic | 5h 56' 22" |
| 2 | Gilberto Simoni (ITA) | Lampre–Caffita | s.t. |
| 3 | Fränk Schleck (LUX) | Team CSC | s.t. |
| 4 | Giampaolo Caruso (ITA) | Liberty Seguros–Würth | + 4" |
| 5 | Davide Rebellin (ITA) | Gerolsteiner | + 54" |
| 6 | Fabian Wegmann (GER) | Gerolsteiner | + 54" |
| 7 | Gorazd Štangelj (SLO) | Lampre–Caffita | + 54" |
| 8 | Martin Elmiger (SUI) | Phonak | + 54" |
| 9 | Massimilano Gentili (ITA) | Naturino–Sapore di Mare | + 54" |
| 10 | Santo Anzà (ITA) | Acqua & Sapone–Adria Mobil | + 54" |
