= 2000 Giro di Lombardia =

Race details
- Dates: 21 October 2000
- Stages: 1
- Distance: 258 km (160.3 mi)
- Winning time: 6h 18' 36"

Results
	Winner	Raimondas Rumšas (LTU)	(Fassa Bortolo)
	Second	Francesco Casagrande (ITA)	(Vini Caldirola–Sidermec)
	Third	Niklas Axelsson (SWE)	(Ceramica Panaria–Gaerne)

The 2000 Giro di Lombardia was the 94th edition of the Giro di Lombardia cycle race and was held on 21 October 2000. The race started in Varese and finished in Bergamo. The race was won by Raimondas Rumšas of the Fassa Bortolo team.

== General classification ==
Final general classification

Rank	Rider	Team	Time
1	Raimondas Rumšas (LTU)	Fassa Bortolo	6h 18' 36"
2	Francesco Casagrande (ITA)	Vini Caldirola–Sidermec	+ 0"
3	Niklas Axelsson (SWE)	Ceramica Panaria–Gaerne	+ 4"
4	Beat Zberg (SUI)	Rabobank	+ 7"
5	Michele Bartoli (ITA)	Mapei–Quick-Step	+ 7"
6	Davide Rebellin (ITA)	Liquigas–Pata	+ 7"
7	Wladimir Belli (ITA)	Fassa Bortolo	+ 22"
8	Massimo Codol (ITA)	Lampre–Daikin	+ 2' 11"
9	Gorazd Štangelj (SLO)	Liquigas–Pata	+ 2' 57"
10	Paolo Bettini (ITA)	Mapei–Quick-Step	+ 3' 35"
