= 2002 Liège–Bastogne–Liège =

Race details
- Dates: 21 April 2002
- Stages: 1
- Distance: 258 km (160 mi)
- Winning time: 6h 39' 44"

Results
	Winner	Paolo Bettini (ITA)	(Mapei–Quick-Step)
	Second	Stefano Garzelli (ITA)	(Mapei–Quick-Step)
	Third	Ivan Basso (ITA)	(Fassa Bortolo)

The 2002 Liège–Bastogne–Liège was the 88th edition of the Liège–Bastogne–Liège cycle race and was held on 21 April 2002. The race started in Liège and finished in Ans. The race was won by Paolo Bettini of the Mapei team.

== General classification ==
Final general classification

Rank	Rider	Team	Time
1	Paolo Bettini (ITA)	Mapei–Quick-Step	6h 39' 44"
2	Stefano Garzelli (ITA)	Mapei–Quick-Step	+ 0"
3	Ivan Basso (ITA)	Fassa Bortolo	+ 15"
4	Mirko Celestino (ITA)	Saeco–Longoni Sport	+ 23"
5	Massimo Codol (ITA)	Lampre–Daikin	+ 28"
6	Matthias Kessler (GER)	Team Telekom	+ 35"
7	Peter Van Petegem (BEL)	Lotto–Adecco	+ 1' 03"
8	Francesco Casagrande (ITA)	Fassa Bortolo	+ 1' 03"
9	Davide Rebellin (ITA)	Gerolsteiner	+ 1' 03"
10	Alexander Vinokourov (KAZ)	Team Telekom	+ 1' 03"
