= 2002 Amstel Gold Race =

Dutch cycling race

The 2002 Amstel Gold Race was the 37th edition of the annual Amstel Gold Race road bicycle race, held on Sunday April 28, 2002 in the Limburg province, The Netherlands. The race stretched 254.4 kilometres, with the start and finish in Maastricht. There were a total of 195 competitors, with 98 of them finishing the race.

== Results ==
	Cyclist	Team	Time
1	Michele Bartoli (ITA)	Fassa Bortolo	6h 49' 17"
2	Sergei Ivanov (RUS)	Fassa Bortolo	s.t.
3	Michael Boogerd (NED)	Rabobank	s.t.
~~4~~	~~Lance Armstrong (USA)~~	U.S. Postal Service	s.t.
5	Óscar Freire (ESP)	Mapei–Quick-Step	+ 52"
6	Peter Van Petegem (BEL)	Lotto–Adecco	s.t.
7	Jo Planckaert (BEL)	Cofidis	s.t.
8	Paolo Bettini (ITA)	Mapei–Quick-Step	s.t.
9	Erik Zabel (GER)	Team Telekom	s.t.
10	Nico Mattan (BEL)	Cofidis	s.t.
