= 2003 Amstel Gold Race =

Dutch cycling race

The 2003 Amstel Gold Race was the 38th edition of the Amstel Gold Race road bicycle race, held on Sunday April 20, 2003 in the Limburg province, The Netherlands. The race stretched 250.7 kilometres, with the start in Maastricht and the finish in Valkenburg. There were a total number of 197 competitors, with 122 of them finishing the race.

== Result ==
	Cyclist	Team	Time
1	Alexander Vinokourov (KAZ)	Team Telekom	6h 01' 03"
2	Michael Boogerd (NED)	Rabobank	+ 4"
3	Danilo Di Luca (ITA)	Saeco	+ 4"
4	Davide Rebellin (ITA)	Gerolsteiner	+ 4"
5	Matthias Kessler (GER)	Team Telekom	+ 4"
6	Francesco Casagrande (ITA)	Lampre	+ 6"
7	Michele Scarponi (ITA)	Domina Vacanze-Elitron	+ 6"
~~8~~	~~Lance Armstrong (USA)~~	U.S. Postal Service	+ 8"
9	Ángel Vicioso (ESP)	ONCE–Eroski	+ 12"
10	Igor Astarloa (ESP)	Saeco	+ 20"
