= 2005 Amstel Gold Race =

Annual bicycle race

2005 UCI ProTour

Race details
- Dates: 17 April 2005
- Stages: 1
- Distance: 250.7 km (155.8 mi)
- Winning time: 6h 21' 07"

Results
	Winner	Danilo Di Luca (ITA)	(Liquigas–Bianchi)
	Second	Michael Boogerd (NED)	(Rabobank)
	Third	Mirko Celestino (ITA)	(Domina Vacanze)

In the 2005 Amstel Gold Race, these are the results for the 40th edition of the annual Amstel Gold Race cycling classic, which was held on Sunday 17 April 2005 and gave Liquigas–Bianchi its first major classic win.

== General Standings ==
=== 17-04-2005: Maastricht-Valkenburg, 250.7 km. ===
	Rider	Team	Time
1	Danilo Di Luca (ITA)	Liquigas–Bianchi	6h 21' 07"
2	Michael Boogerd (NED)	Rabobank	s.t.
3	Mirko Celestino (ITA)	Domina Vacanze	s.t.
4	Davide Rebellin (ITA)	Gerolsteiner	s.t.
5	Miguel Ángel Martín Perdiguero (ESP)	Phonak	s.t.
6	Patrik Sinkewitz (GER)	Quick-Step–Innergetic	s.t.
7	Björn Leukemans (BEL)	Davitamon–Lotto	s.t.
8	David Etxebarria (ESP)	Liberty Seguros–Würth	s.t.
9	Jérôme Pineau (FRA)	Bouygues Télécom	s.t.
10	Óscar Freire (ESP)	Rabobank	s.t.
