= 2003 Milan–San Remo =

Race details
- Dates: March 22, 2003
- Stages: 1
- Distance: 297 km (185 mi)
- Winning time: 6h 44' 43"

Results
	Winner	Paolo Bettini (ITA)	(Quick-Step–Davitamon)
	Second	Mirko Celestino (ITA)	(Saeco)
	Third	Luca Paolini (ITA)	(Quick-Step–Davitamon)

The 2003 Milan–San Remo was the 94th edition of the monument classic Milan–San Remo and was won by Italian Paolo Bettini of Quick-Step–Davitamon. The race was run on March 22, 2003, and the 297 kilometres (185 mi) was covered in 6 hours, 44 minutes and 43 seconds.

== Results ==
	Cyclist	Team	Time
1	Paolo Bettini (ITA)	Quick-Step–Davitamon	6h 44' 43"
2	Mirko Celestino (ITA)	Saeco	s.t.
3	Luca Paolini (ITA)	Quick-Step–Davitamon	+2"
4	Mario Cipollini (ITA)	Domina Vacanze	+11"
5	Dario Pieri (ITA)	Saeco	s.t.
6	Erik Zabel (GER)	Team Telekom	s.t.
7	Óscar Freire (ESP)	Rabobank	s.t.
8	Ján Svorada (CZE)	Lampre	s.t.
9	Serguei Ivanov (RUS)	Fassa Bortolo	s.t.
10	Guido Trenti (USA)	Fassa Bortolo	s.t.
