= 2004 La Flèche Wallonne =

Race details
- Dates: 21 April 2004
- Stages: 1
- Distance: 199.5 km (124.0 mi)
- Winning time: 4h 31' 33"

Results
	Winner	Davide Rebellin (ITA)	(Gerolsteiner)
	Second	Danilo Di Luca (ITA)	(Saeco)
	Third	Matthias Kessler (GER)	(T-Mobile Team)

The 2004 La Flèche Wallonne was the 68th edition of La Flèche Wallonne cycle race and was held on 21 April 2004. The race started in Charleroi and finished in Huy. Davide Rebellin of the Gerolsteiner team won the race.

== General classification ==
Final general classification

Rank	Rider	Team	Time
1	Davide Rebellin (ITA)	Gerolsteiner	4h 31' 33"
2	Danilo Di Luca (ITA)	Saeco	+ 3"
3	Matthias Kessler (GER)	T-Mobile Team	+ 9"
4	Michele Scarponi (ITA)	De Nardi–Piemme Telekom	+ 12"
5	Alexander Vinokourov (KAZ)	T-Mobile Team	+ 16"
6	Andreas Klöden (GER)	T-Mobile Team	+ 18"
7	Frank Vandenbroucke (BEL)	Fassa Bortolo	+ 18"
8	Marcos Serrano (ESP)	Liberty Seguros	+ 18"
9	Markus Zberg (SUI)	Gerolsteiner	+ 20"
10	Manuel Beltrán (ESP)	U.S. Postal Service	+ 20"
