= 2016 Amstel Gold Race =

2016 UCI World Tour, race 11 of 28

Race details
- Dates: 17 April 2016
- Stages: 1
- Distance: 248.7 km (154.5 mi)
- Winning time: 6h 18' 02"

Results
	Winner	Enrico Gasparotto (ITA)	(Wanty–Groupe Gobert)
	Second	Michael Valgren (DEN)	(Tinkoff)
	Third	Sonny Colbrelli (ITA)	(Bardiani–CSF)

The 2016 Amstel Gold Race was a one-day classic cycling race that took place in the Limburg region of the Netherlands on 17 April 2016. It was the 51st edition of the Amstel Gold Race and the eleventh event of the 2016 UCI World Tour. It was also the first of the Ardennes classics, although it is technically not in the Ardennes region. The race took place over a 258-kilometre (160 mi) route that starts in Maastricht and ends in Berg en Terblijt on the outskirts of Valkenburg. The key difficulty in the race came from the 34 short but steep climbs. The central climb, the Cauberg, was crossed four times, with 1.8 kilometres (1.1 mi) between the final summit and the finish line. The favourites for victory in the race included the three-time winner Philippe Gilbert (BMC), the defending champion Michał Kwiatkowski (Sky), and Simon Gerrans and Michael Matthews (both Orica–GreenEDGE).

There were numerous attacks in the first part of the race, but no group had a significant advantage in the last part of the race. Tim Wellens (Lotto–Soudal) had a small lead on the final climb of the Cauberg, but he was caught before the summit by a large group led by Orica–GreenEDGE. Towards the summit of the climb, Enrico Gasparotto (Wanty–Groupe Gobert), the 2012 champion, attacked; he was joined by Tinkoff's Michael Valgren and the two came to the finish together, with Gasparotto winning the sprint for victory. Sonny Colbrelli (Bardiani–CSF) was third in the main group, which finished four seconds behind.

== Route ==
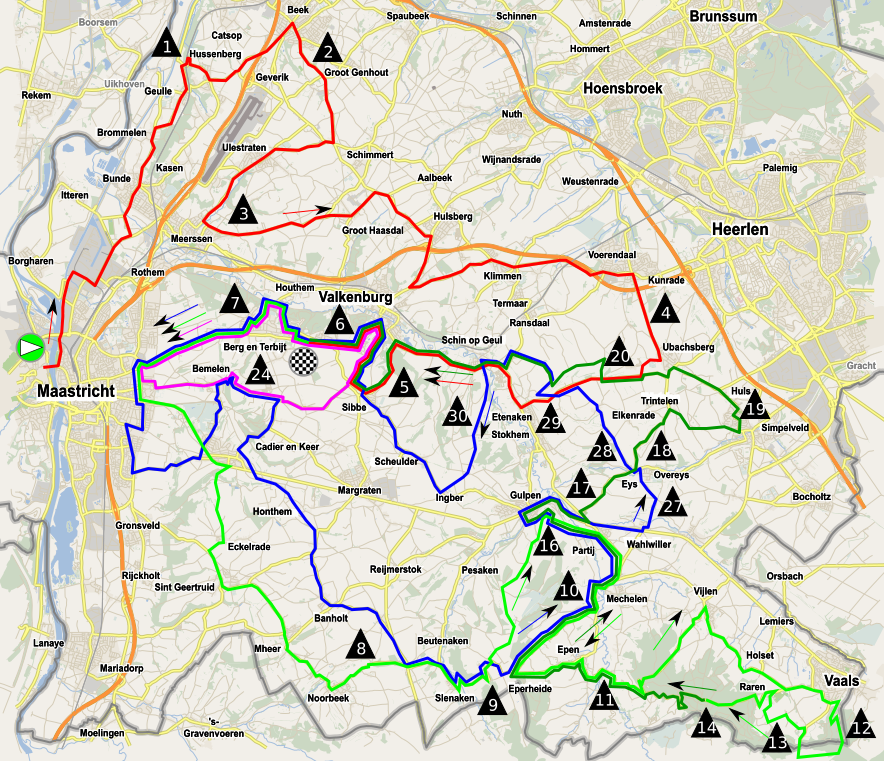
Route of the 2016 race

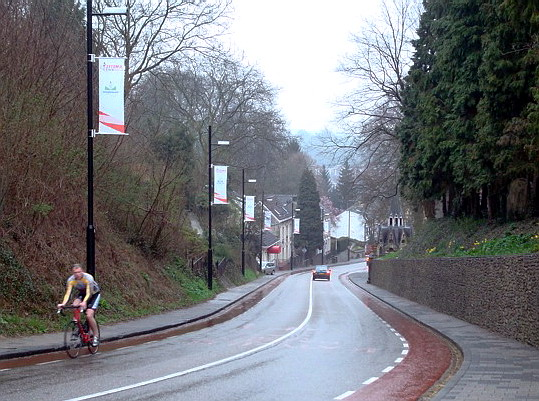
The Cauberg, which is climbed four times during the Amstel Gold Race

The route covered 258 kilometres (160 mi) and included 34 classified climbs; as in the other Ardennes classics (La Flèche Wallonne and Liège–Bastogne–Liège), the main difficulty came from the short but steep climbs. The route started in Maastricht and travelled north to the outskirts of Geleen for the first three climbs of the day. The route turned east to Voerendaal for the fourth climb, then west for the first climb of the Sibbergrubbe. This took the riders into Valkenburg aan de Geul and onto the first of four climbs of the Cauberg, where there was a series of three circuits, each shorter than the last. The first circuit took the riders on a long loop to the south of Valkenburg as far as Vaals. This included the first climb of the Geulhemmerberg, then fifteen more climbs. These included the Loorberg and the Gulpenerberg for the first time and the Sibbergrubbe and the Cauberg for the second time. The second climb of the Cauberg came with 165 kilometres (103 mi) completed and 93 kilometres (58 mi) remaining.

The second circuit again took the riders south, through the town of Gulpen. This circuit included the Bemelerberg for the first time, the Geulhemmerberg, the Loorberg and the Gulpenerberg for the second time and then the Cauberg for the third time. Between this ascent of the Cauberg and the finish line were 21 kilometres (13 mi) of roads that were raced around a small circuit close to Valkenburg. The circuit included the third climb of the Sibbergrubbe, then the second climb of the Bemelerberg and finally the fourth climb of the Cauberg. At the top of the Cauberg there were 1.8 kilometres (1.1 mi) of relatively flat roads to the finish line in Berg en Terblijt.

The Cauberg was expected to be the decisive climb in the race. The first two climbs were expected to be raced gently, but the final two times were expected to be central to the race's outcome. The Cauberg itself is an 800-metre (870 yd) climb with an average gradient of 6.5% and a maximum gradient of 12.8%. Additional difficulty was created throughout the route by the roads that frequently turned back on themselves and by the high density of traffic calming devices. Cyclingnews.com described the route as "technically demanding" and "a fertile ground for crashes", adding that local knowledge was valuable.

Classified climbs in the 2016 Amstel Gold Race
Number	Name	Distance from start (km)	Length (m)	Average gradient (%)	Maximum gradient (%)
1	Slingerberg	9.4	900	4.4%	9.5%
2	Adsteeg	14.1	700	4.3%	7.5%
3	Lange Raarberg	22.3	1700	3.7%	6.6%
4	Bergseweg	38.0	2700	3.3%	6.8%
5	Sibbergrubbe (1st time)	49.7	2100	3.6%	6.0%
6	Cauberg (1st time)	54.1	800	6.5%	12.8%
7	Geulhemmerberg (1st time)	58.6	1200	4.6%	8.0%
8	Wolfsberg	78.1	1200	2.8%	12.0%
9	Loorberg (1st time)	81.2	1500	5.3%	8.6%
10	Schweibergerweg	92.5	2700	4.5%	7.1%
11	Camerig	98.9	4400	4.0%	7.7%
12	Drielandenpunt	109.5	3200	4.4%	9.9%
13	Gemmenich	114.0	2200	5.0%	8.8%
14	Vijlenerbos	117.8	2700	3.8%	10.7%
15	Eperheide	126.5	2100	4.7%	8.0%
16	Gulpenerberg (1st time)	135.1	600	5.7%	13.9%
17	Plettenberg	141.6	1200	3.7%	8.0%
18	Eyserweg	143.7	2100	4.4%	9.0%
19	St. Remigiusstraat: Huls	148.2	900	7.8%	10.7%
20	Vrakelberg	153.5	600	7.2%	11.4%
21	Sibbergrubbe	161.2	2100	3.6%	6.0%
22	Cauberg (2nd time)	165.5	800	6.5%	12.8%
23	Geulhemmerberg (2nd time)	170.2	1200	4.6%	8.0%
24	Bemelerberg (1st time)	182.9	900	4.5%	7.0%
25	Loorberg (2nd time)	198.2	1500	5.3%	8.6%
26	Gulpenerberg (2nd time)	207.7	600	5.7%	13.9%
27	Kruisberg	216.7	600	8.8%	15.5%
28	Eyserbosweg	218.6	900	9.3%	17.0%
29	Fromberg	222.4	1600	3.6%	8.0%
30	Keutenberg	226.9	1200	5.9%	22%
31	Cauberg (3rd time)	236.9	800	6.5%	12.8%
32	Geulhemmerberg (3rd time)	241.5	1200	4.6%	8.0%
33	Bemelerberg (2nd time)	251.0	900	4.5%	7.0%
34	Cauberg (4th time)	256.2	800	6.5%	12.8%

== Participating teams ==
The race organisers invited 25 teams to participate in the 2016 Amstel Gold Race. As it is a UCI World Tour event, all 18 UCI WorldTeams were invited automatically and were obliged to send a squad. An additional seven UCI Professional Continental teams were given wildcard entries. These included two Belgian teams (Topsport Vlaanderen–Baloise and Wanty–Groupe Gobert), a Dutch team (Roompot–Oranje Peloton), two Italian teams (Nippo–Vini Fantini and Bardiani–CSF), a Polish team (CCC–Sprandi–Polkowice) and a French team (Direct Énergie).

UCI WorldTeams

- AG2R La Mondiale
- Astana
- BMC Racing Team
- Team Dimension Data
- Etixx–Quick-Step
- FDJ
- IAM Cycling
- Lampre–Merida
- Lotto–Soudal
- Movistar Team
- Team Giant–Alpecin
- Team Katusha
- LottoNL–Jumbo
- Team Sky
- Tinkoff
- Trek–Segafredo
- Cannondale
- Orica–GreenEDGE

UCI Professional Continental teams

- Topsport Vlaanderen–Baloise
- Wanty–Groupe Gobert
- Nippo–Vini Fantini
- Bardiani–CSF
- CCC–Sprandi–Polkowice
- Direct Énergie
- Roompot–Oranje Peloton

== Pre-race favourites ==
The defending champion was Michał Kwiatkowski, who won the 2015 race while riding for Etixx–Quick-Step but moved to Team Sky for the 2016 season. He won that race by catching up with the leading riders on the flat section following the final climb and outsprinting them at the line. He was also in strong form, having won the E3 Harelbeke a few weeks previously. Kwiatkowski was considered to able both to attack on the final climb and also to win from a small group sprint.

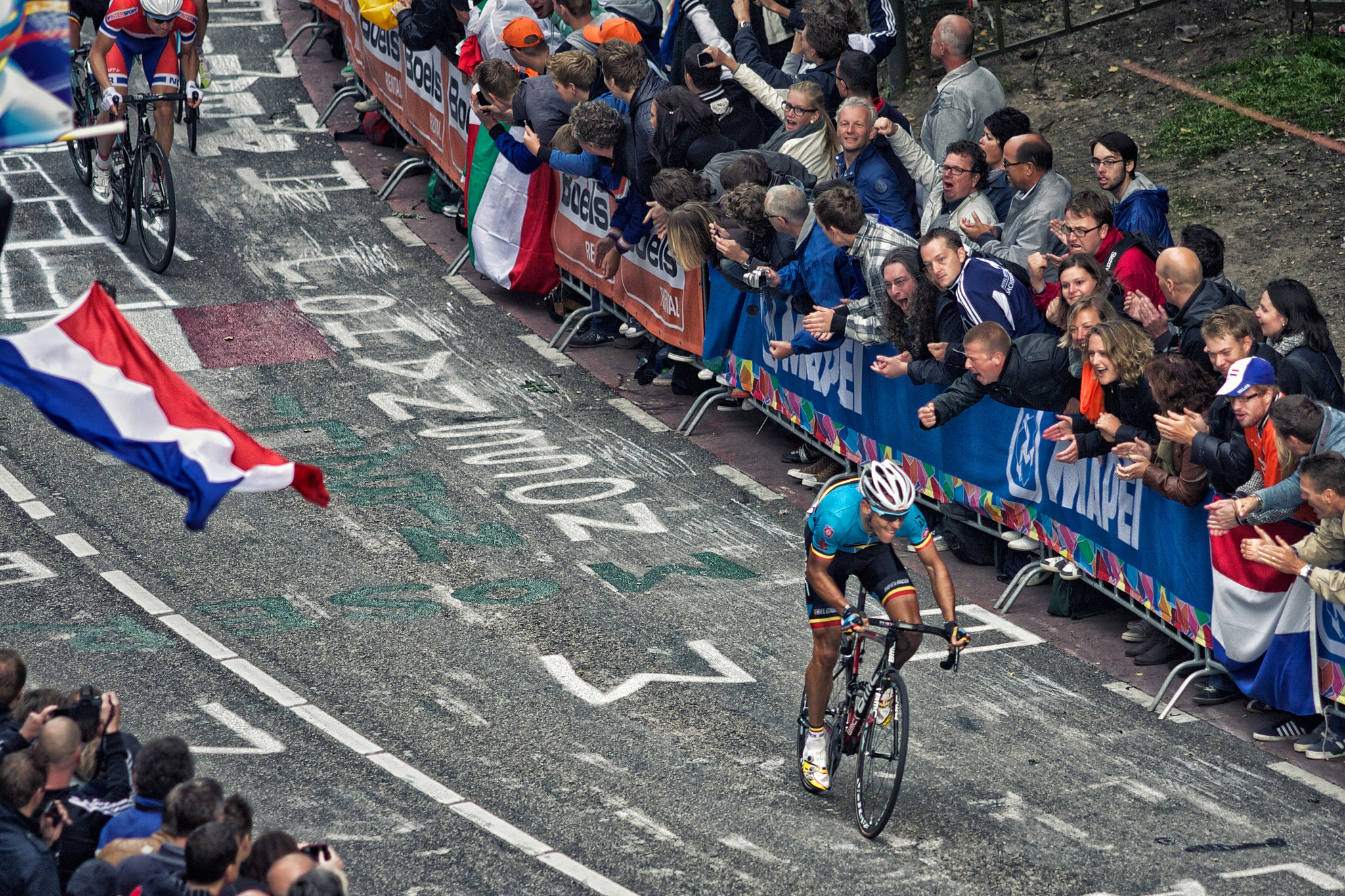
Philippe Gilbert (BMC), attacking on the Cauberg to win the 2012 world championships road race

The previous champion was Philippe Gilbert (BMC Racing Team), who had won the race a total of three times as well as winning the 2012 world championships road race that finished with the same Cauberg finale. He had won the 2014 edition by escaping on the climb and, with the assistance of a tailwind, staying away to the finish. Gilbert had recently been involved in an altercation with a driver in which he had broken a finger; he missed Brabantse Pijl in order to have metal pins inserted and it was unclear whether he would be able to play a major part in the race.

Orica–GreenEDGE had two major favourites for the race: Michael Matthews and Simon Gerrans. Matthews had been third in 2015, while Gerrans had finished third on three other occasions. They were declared to be "joint leaders" by their team, but in the 2015 road race world championships had sprinted against one another, despite being on the same team. Gerrans in particular was in good form, following his performance in the 2016 Tour of the Basque Country, while Matthews had declared the Amstel Gold Race to be one of the main objectives of his season.

The last rider to win the race from a long-range breakaway had been Roman Kreuziger (Tinkoff) in 2013, but he had failed to perform well in the race since then. Other possible winners included Etixx–Quick-Step's Julian Alaphilippe and Petr Vakoč, Movistar Team's Daniel Moreno, Wanty–Groupe Gobert's Enrico Gasparotto (the 2012 champion), Team Giant–Alpecin's Simon Geschke, Lotto–Soudal's Tony Gallopin, Team Dimension Data's Edvald Boasson Hagen and Trek–Segafredo's Fabio Felline.

== Race summary ==
In the neutral section before the official start of the race, Fabio Felline crashed. He was reaching down to adjust something at the front of his bike; his wheel then jammed and the bike stopped abruptly. Felline was thrown over the handlebars and hit the ground face first. He broke his nose and suffered a fracture at the base of his skull. The injuries put him out of both the Amstel Gold Race and the rest of the Ardennes week.

When the racing started, it took 35 kilometres (22 mi) for a breakaway to form. Eleven riders escaped and, over the following 15 kilometres (9.3 mi), built a four-minute lead. The riders in the breakaway were Alex Howes (Cannondale), Laurent Didier (Trek–Segafredo), Matteo Montaguti (AG2R La Mondiale), Laurens De Vreese (Astana), Matteo Bono (Lampre–Merida), Kévin Reza (FDJ), Larry Warbasse (IAM Cycling), Fabien Grellier (Direct Énergie), Giacomo Berlato (Nippo–Vini Fantini), Tom Devriendt (Wanty–Groupe Gobert) and Josef Černý (CCC–Sprandi–Polkowice). Their lead reached five minutes at the foot of the first ascent of the Cauberg. In the peloton, Sky, Orica–GreenEDGE and AG2R La Mondiale led the chase and the lead was reduced to just over three minutes when they crossed the finish line for the second time. Rain began to fall, causing a crash for Joaquim Rodríguez (Team Katusha).

With 65 kilometres (40 mi) remaining, a four-man group broke free of the peloton. The riders were Tosh Van der Sande (Lotto–Soudal), Niccolò Bonifazio (Trek–Segafredo), Gianni Meersman (Etixx–Quick-Step) and Björn Thurau (Wanty–Groupe Gobert). They were chased unsuccessfully by Andriy Hrivko (Astana); the four-man group reduced the breakaway's advantage to 90 seconds. On the Gulpenerberg, Reza and Didier were dropped from the breakaway, which had a two-minute lead over the peloton. Michael Albasini (Orica–GreenEDGE) attacked in the main group but was chased by Team Sky; Orica–GreenEDGE then brought the four-man chasing group back before the summit of the Keutenberg. With 25 kilometres (16 mi) remaining, Philippe Gilbert and Edvald Boasson Hagen were dropped.

On the penultimate climb of the Cauberg, the breakaway was reduced to five riders, who had a fifteen-second lead. Bob Jungels (Etixx–Quick-Step) and Enrico Battaglin (LottoNL–Jumbo) attacked from the peloton, while Michał Kwiatkowski was among the riders dropped. Orica–GreenEDGE continued to lead the peloton with Albasini and Mathew Hayman, the winner of Paris–Roubaix the previous week. The breakaway was caught with 14 kilometres (8.7 mi) remaining. Roman Kreuziger attacked with 8 kilometres (5.0 mi) remaining; there was an immediate counter-attack from Tim Wellens (Lotto–Soudal), who passed Kreuziger and earned a fifteen-second lead at the bottom of the final climb of the Cauberg.

As Albasini brought Wellens back on the Cauberg, Enrico Gasparotto attacked. He was followed by Tinkoff's Michael Valgren at the top of the climb. Despite a brief attack from Jelle Vanendert (Lotto–Soudal), no one in the peloton seemed willing to put the effort into catching the leading pair. Valgren did a long pull at the front of the race, with Gasparotto in his wheel. At the finish line, Gasparotto was easily able to come around him to take his second Amstel Gold Race victory. Sonny Colbrelli (Bardiani–CSF) won the sprint for third place.

== Result ==
Result (top 10)
Rank	Rider	Team	Time
1	Enrico Gasparotto (ITA)	Wanty–Groupe Gobert	6h 18' 03"
2	Michael Valgren (DEN)	Tinkoff	+ 0"
3	Sonny Colbrelli (ITA)	Bardiani–CSF	+ 4"
4	Bryan Coquard (FRA)	Direct Énergie	+ 4"
5	Michael Matthews (AUS)	Orica–GreenEDGE	+ 4"
6	Julian Alaphilippe (FRA)	Etixx–Quick-Step	+ 4"
7	Diego Ulissi (ITA)	Lampre–Merida	+ 4"
8	Giovanni Visconti (ITA)	Movistar Team	+ 4"
9	Loïc Vliegen (BEL)	BMC Racing Team	+ 4"
10	Tim Wellens (BEL)	Lotto–Soudal	+ 4"

== Post-race analysis ==
=== Reactions ===
The race was Gasparotto's first win since his first Amstel Gold triumph in 2012. He crossed the line pointing to the sky in a reference to his former teammate Antoine Demoitié, who had been killed in an accident at Gent–Wevelgem two weeks previously. Cycling Weekly described his victory as "emotional". Gasparotto himself had not been at Demoitié's funeral as he had been training on Mount Teide in Tenerife. He had been encouraged by Demoitié's widow the previous day and said that he had felt a "really big responsibility" and had not wanted to let his teammates down. He also said that, as in his 2012 victory, he had used the 39-tooth inner ring for most of the climb and had only changed to the 53-tooth outer ring at the summit, for the flat section towards the finish line. Gasparotto also credited his victory to Valgren's presence with him, as Valgren was willing to pull hard in the final kilometre.

Valgren, meanwhile, said that his second-place finish was a "big result" for him. Because Valgren was so determined to stay ahead of the chasing group, Gasparotto was able to sit in behind him and come past at the finish when Valgren was tired. Nonetheless, he said that he was happy with his performance and that he hoped to come back and win the race in the future. Cyclingnews.com described the result as "a big step up" for him. Colbrelli, however, said that he had "mixed feelings" about his third-place finish. He said that the calibre of the riders who had finished behind him demonstrated that he had ridden "a great race" but also that he had "waited for too long" to try to bring the leading pair back.

Kwiatkowski tweeted after the race that the weather had been a factor in his disappointing performance: he wrote "I tried my hardest but the hail with rain froze my hands, feet, legs, back and, finally, my thoughts and ambitions." His team's directeur sportif, Kurt Asle Arvesen, said that he "didn't have good legs" and that the two Sky riders in the group at the end of the race – Sergio Henao and Lars Petter Nordhaug – had been unable to go with the attack on the Cauberg and were not strong enough to compete with the sprinters at the finish.

=== UCI World Tour standings ===
There were no significant changes in the standings of the season-long 2016 UCI World Tour competition. Because Gasparotto, Colbrelli and Bryan Coquard (Direct Énergie) all rode for Professional Continental teams rather than World Teams, they did not earn any World Tour points. Valgren's second-place finish earned him 60 points; this put him in 25th place in the individual standings but it also helped Tinkoff to an increased lead in the team standings. Australia, meanwhile, retained a two-point lead over Belgium in the nations' standings.

UCI World Tour standings on 17 April 2016
Rank	Rider	Team	Points
1	Peter Sagan (SVK)	Tinkoff	329
2	Alberto Contador (ESP)	Tinkoff	280
3	Richie Porte (AUS)	BMC Racing Team	222
4	Sergio Henao (COL)	Team Sky	204
5	Sep Vanmarcke (BEL)	LottoNL–Jumbo	201
6	Nairo Quintana (COL)	Movistar Team	178
7	Fabian Cancellara (SUI)	Trek–Segafredo	166
8	Greg Van Avermaet (BEL)	BMC Racing Team	162
9	Arnaud Démare (FRA)	FDJ	137
10	Ian Stannard (GBR)	Team Sky	120
