= Amstel Gold Race (men's race) =

Dutch one-day road cycling race

Race details
- Date: Mid to late April
- Region: Limburg, Netherlands
- English name: Amstel Gold Race
- Nickname(s): The Amstel, The Gold Race, Nederlands Mooiste (Dutch for "The Netherlands' Most Beautiful"), AGR, "The Beer Classic"
- Discipline: Road
- Competition: UCI World Tour
- Type: One-day Classic, Hills Classic, Ardennes Classic
- Organiser: Amstel Gold Race Foundation (Heineken NV), Flanders Classics (since 2025), The PEPr Company
- Race director: Leo van Vliet
- Web site: amstelgoldrace.nl

History
- First edition: 1966
- Editions: 60
- First winner: Jean Stablinski (FRA)
- Most wins: Jan Raas (NED) (5 wins)
- Most recent: Remco Evenepoel (BEL)

The Amstel Gold Race is a one-day classic road cycling race held annually since 1966 in the province of Limburg, Netherlands. It traditionally marks the turning point of the spring classics, with the climbers and stage racers replacing the cobbled classics riders as the favourites.

Since 1989, the event has been included in season-long competitions at the highest level of the UCI, as part of the UCI Road World Cup (1989–2004), the UCI ProTour (2005–2010), the UCI World Ranking (2009–2010), and, since 2011, the UCI World Tour. It is the only one-day World Tour race staged in the Netherlands and is considered the most important Dutch road cycling event. Dutchman Jan Raas holds the winning record with five victories.

Dutch beer brewer Amstel has served as the race's title sponsor since its creation in 1966. The name does not directly refer to the river Amstel, which runs through and near the city of Amsterdam. It took place without interruption until the COVID-19 pandemic.

Since 2017, a Women's Amstel Gold Race has been held following a 14-year hiatus. The event is organised on the same day and on largely the same roads as the men's race and is part of the UCI Women's World Tour.

== History ==
=== The first race ===
The Amstel Gold Race was created by Dutch sports promoters Ton Vissers and Herman Krott, who ran a company called Inter Sport. (Note: Vissers was a house decorator and field hockey player from Rotterdam whose break-in cycling came in 1963 when a friend asked him to manage a minor team in the Tour of the Netherlands. Those who were there say he was as hopeless as his riders. Officials banished him after he did a U-turn and drove back towards the oncoming race after hearing that one of his riders had punctured. Three years later, in 1966, he became manager of the Willem II professional team that at one time included the winner of the classic, Rik Van Looy.) (Note: Krott's background in cycling was barely deeper. He ran a car parts dealership called HeKro and, because he admired the Dutch rider Peter Post, worked as his personal assistant. He had also worked as a sales representative for Amstel. Together, Krott and Vissers organised small races across the Netherlands. Krott also used his contacts at Amstel to start an Amstel professional team and then the sponsorship to run an international professional race bigger than the round-the-houses events Inter Sport had been promoting until then.) Their objective was to create a Dutch classic cycle race able to compete with the monument races of Flanders and Italy. The first edition was announced to take place on 30 April 1966, the Netherlands' National Holiday. The plan was to start in Amsterdam, before branching out to the east of the country and finishing in Maastricht, in the southeast, totalling 280 km (170 mi). (Note: Prize money would be 10,000 guilders (about €5,000)—of which a fifth would go to the winner.)

Logistical complications emerged prior to the race. Krott and Vissers had neglected the many rivers along the route and miscalculated the zigzags needed to cross them, making the intended distance far longer than 280 km (170 mi). New plans were made to start in Utrecht, then Rotterdam; and to stage an alternative finish in the small village of Meerssen in Limburg. Less than three weeks before the start, organisers realised they had not obtained permission to cross the Moerdijk Bridge, the only exit route out of Rotterdam. The route had to be redrawn again, and the start was moved further south to Breda. Concurrently, the Dutch militant counterculture movement Provo had declared a state of anarchy in the Netherlands. (Note: At the other end of the social scale, many Dutch people were also protesting against the marriage of the queen's daughter, Beatrix, to a German, Claus von Amsberg.) Authorities feared that a race organised on the royal family's celebration day could trigger uprisings.

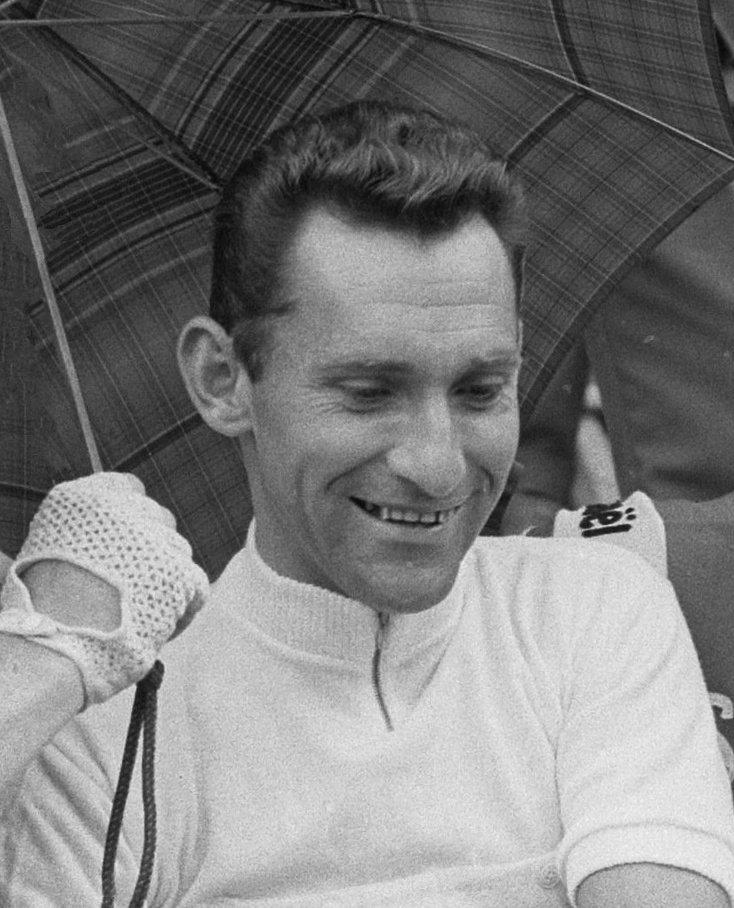
Jean Stablinski won the inaugural edition in 1966.

Four days before the anticipated date, Vissers and Krott called off their race and were staging a press conference, when the Dutch roads ministry in The Hague called to say that the race could be organised after all—provided it would never again be scheduled on Queen's Day.

On Saturday 30 April 1966, the first Amstel Gold Race was raced from Breda to Meerssen without serious incidents. Three riders from the Ford-France team sprinted for victory. Dutchman Jan Hugens suffered a mechanical failure in the final metres and was beaten by Frenchman Jean Stablinski, who won the inaugural edition. At 302 km (188 mi), it was the longest edition ever run. There were 120 starters, of which only 30 finished. Despite its original intent, the Amstel Gold Race has never started in Amsterdam, Rotterdam, or Utrecht. (Note: Inter Sport ceased trading in 1970 and Herman Krott directed the race by himself until 1995, when it was taken over by former professional cyclist Leo van Vliet.)

=== Search for identity ===
In 1967, the start location moved to Helmond, in front of sponsor Amstel's factory, and the distance was scaled back to 213 km (132 mi). Arie den Hartog won the second edition, becoming the first Dutch winner. In 1968, the race took place on 21 September because of a calendar conflict; it remains the only time the Amstel Gold Race was ever run in the autumn. Dutchman Harrie Steevens won the race over a distance of 254 km (158 mi).

In 1969, the race returned to April. Guido Reybrouck won the fourth edition, initiating a series of Belgian wins. The race was affected by severe snow and hailstorms, forcing many riders to abandon due to hypothermia.

Newsreel of the 1969 Amstel Gold Race with Eddy Merckx (in Dutch)

During its formative years, the Amstel Gold Race struggled to attract elite riders, competing for calendar placement against the older cobbled classics and Ardennes classics. Eddy Merckx did not participate for two years due to disputes over his starting fee. In 1973, race director Herman Krott agreed to pay a considerable sum to Merckx's team, provided that he would win the race. Merckx started and won the Amstel Gold Race more than three minutes ahead of the second-place finisher. Two years later, he became the first rider to win a second time.

In the late 1970s, Dutchman Jan Raas won the Amstel Gold Race a record five times, of which four were consecutive. Raas relied on a strong sprint finish, while also taking two solo victories. The Dutch media subsequently coined the phrase Amstel Gold Raas. In 1983, Australian Phil Anderson became the first non-European winner.

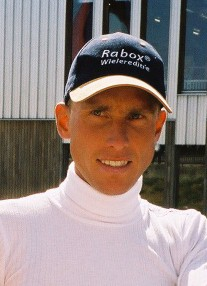
Michael Boogerd was a regular podium finisher.

=== Move to Maastricht ===
In 1991, the finish of the Amstel Gold Race moved to Maastricht, Limburg's capital city, and in 1998, the start also moved there. The character of the race became increasingly defined by the hilly area in the south of the province. Between 1999 and 2019, only two Dutch riders, Michael Boogerd and Erik Dekker, won the race. Both Boogerd and Dekker beat American Lance Armstrong in a two-man sprint in Maastricht, in 1999 and 2001 respectively. The 2001 race had 37 finishers from a 190-strong pack, the lowest number in modern times. Boogerd shares the record of seven podium finishes with Jan Raas, having achieved one victory, four second places, two third places, and several other top-ten finishes.

=== Cauberg finish ===
From 2003 to 2016, the finish was situated shortly after the top of the Cauberg climb in Valkenburg. Kazakh rider Alexander Vinokourov won the first uphill-finish edition with an attack before the Cauberg. In 2013, the finish was moved 1.8 km (1.1 mi) away from the top of the Cauberg, near the centre of Valkenburg, resulting in a flat, straight finish. In 2017, the race organisers moved the finish so that the final climb of the Cauberg came 19 km (12 mi) from the finish, aiming for a more open race.

During the 2010s, the most successful rider was classics specialist Philippe Gilbert. The Belgian won the race four times between 2010 and 2017, basing his victories on late bursts of speed on the Cauberg. This success earned him the nickname "Mister Cauberg", and the event was sometimes colloquially referred to as the "Amstel Gilbert Race". In 2015, Polish rider Michał Kwiatkowski became the first reigning world champion to win the race since Bernard Hinault in 1981. Kwiatkowski won again seven years later, when he outsprinted Benoît Cosnefroy in the finish of the 2022 edition.

Mathieu van der Poel won the 2019 edition after an initial breakaway attempt at the Gulperberg was neutralised before the Kruisberg. Julian Alaphilippe and Jakob Fuglsang escaped at the Eyserbosweg, establishing a lead they held into the final kilometre. However, van der Poel led a small chase group to catch the leaders in the final stretch, subsequently winning the sprint finish.

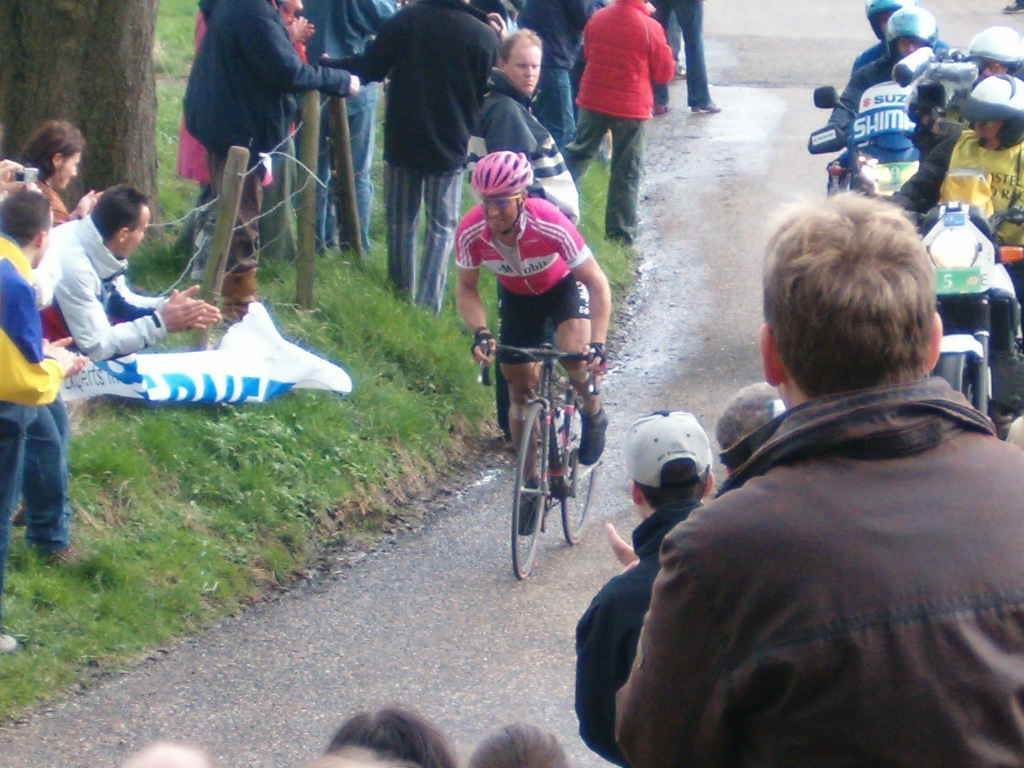
Steffen Wesemann on his way up Eyserbosweg in 2006

== Route ==
Although the Netherlands is known for its flat, wind-affected roads, the Amstel Gold Race takes place in the hilly southern region of Limburg. The route twists through the rolling Limburg countryside, often turning abruptly to climb as many hills (bergen) as possible. The most notable climb is the Cauberg, which is covered up to three times and has sometimes featured in the last few kilometres of the race. The Keutenberg and the Eyserbosweg are two other renowned climbs of the race.

=== Course changes ===
Start and finish locations
Years	Start	Finish
1966	Breda	Meerssen
1967	Helmond	Meerssen
1968	Helmond	Elsloo
1969–1970	Helmond	Meerssen
1971–1990	Heerlen	Meerssen
1991–1997	Heerlen	Maastricht
1998–2002	Maastricht	Maastricht
2003–2012	Maastricht	Valkenburg
2013–present	Maastricht	Berg en Terblijt

The course has changed considerably over the years. The race's inaugural edition started in Breda in North Brabant, but quickly moved closer to the hilly region. From 1971 to 1997, the start was in Heerlen. From 1998, the race started on the central market square in Maastricht's Inner City. Following starts at the Vrijthof square between 2019 and 2023, the start returned to the market square in 2024.

Since 2005, the race has run entirely within the boundaries of Dutch Limburg, except for a short passage through Gemmenich in Belgium immediately following the Vaalserberg climb. Past editions in the 1990s covered significant parts of Liège in Belgium, approaching the Mount Saint Peter, which allowed for a larger selection of climbs.

From 1991 until 2002, the race ended in Maastricht. The finish was on the Maasboulevard, keeping a flat run-in to the finish. In 2000, sprint specialist Erik Zabel won the race, leading out the sprint of a 20-strong group.

From 2003 to 2012, the finish was at the top of the Cauberg climb in the Valkenburg municipality, close to Maastricht. The finale was redesigned in 2013, and the finish was moved west, near the hamlets of Vilt and Berg en Terblijt, 1.8 km (1.1 mi) from the top of the Cauberg. The altered finish mirrors the location used for the 2012 UCI Road World Championships in Valkenburg. Since 2017, the fourth and final climb of the Cauberg has been removed, making the Geulhemmerberg and Bemelerberg (7.4 km (4.6 mi) from the finish) the final climbs. The change was intended to open up the race dynamics.

== Race characteristics ==
=== Ardennes Week ===
Although the race location in Limburg is not part of the Ardennes, neither geographically nor geologically, it is often considered the opening race of the Ardennes Week. In 2004, the Amstel Gold Race swapped places with Liège–Bastogne–Liège on the international calendar. The race is consequently organised on the Sunday after the cobbled classic Paris–Roubaix and before the Ardennes classic Flèche Wallonne the following Wednesday.

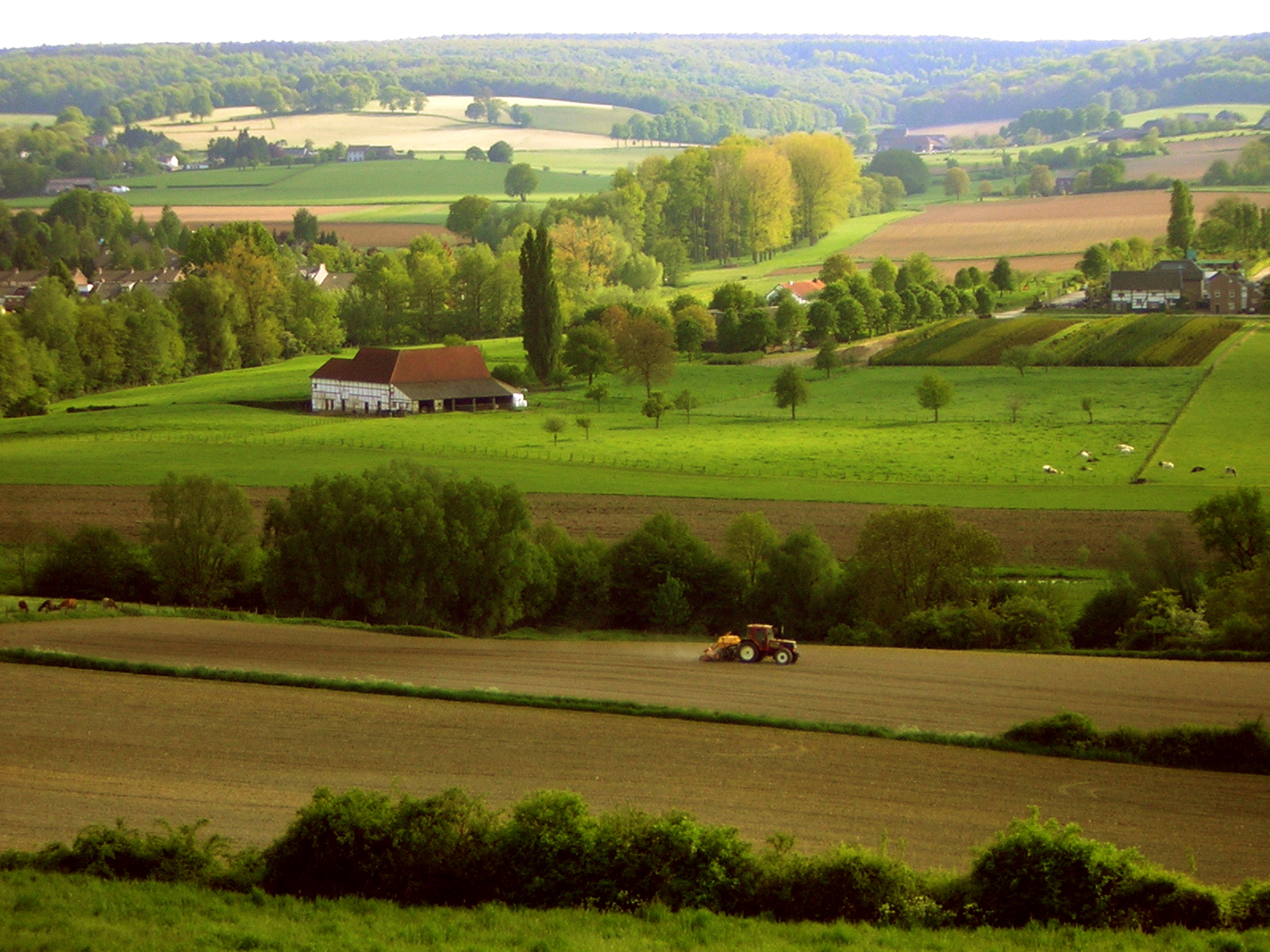
View of Oud-Lemiers, near Vaals, in the southeast of Limburg.

Until 2002, the Amstel Gold Race featured a flat run-in to the finish and was occasionally won by riders excelling in the cobbled classics, notably the Tour of Flanders. During the 1990s and 2000s, organisers shifted the focus of the race towards the hills, altering the race's character. The peloton is usually made up of the same riders starting in the Ardennes races: classics riders with sufficient climbing abilities, as well as Grand Tour specialists.

The hills in the south of Limburg are the Netherlands' only hilly region. The chalk–loess relief was formed by the foothills of the neighbouring Ardennes and Eifel low mountain ranges. The hills define the character of the race: they are generally shorter and not as high as in the Ardennes, but come in much higher frequency than in Liège–Bastogne–Liège. The highest point of the region and the race is Vaalserberg at 322.7 m (1,059 ft) above sea level; the top of the Cauberg is at 133.7 m (439 ft) altitude.

=== Hills ===
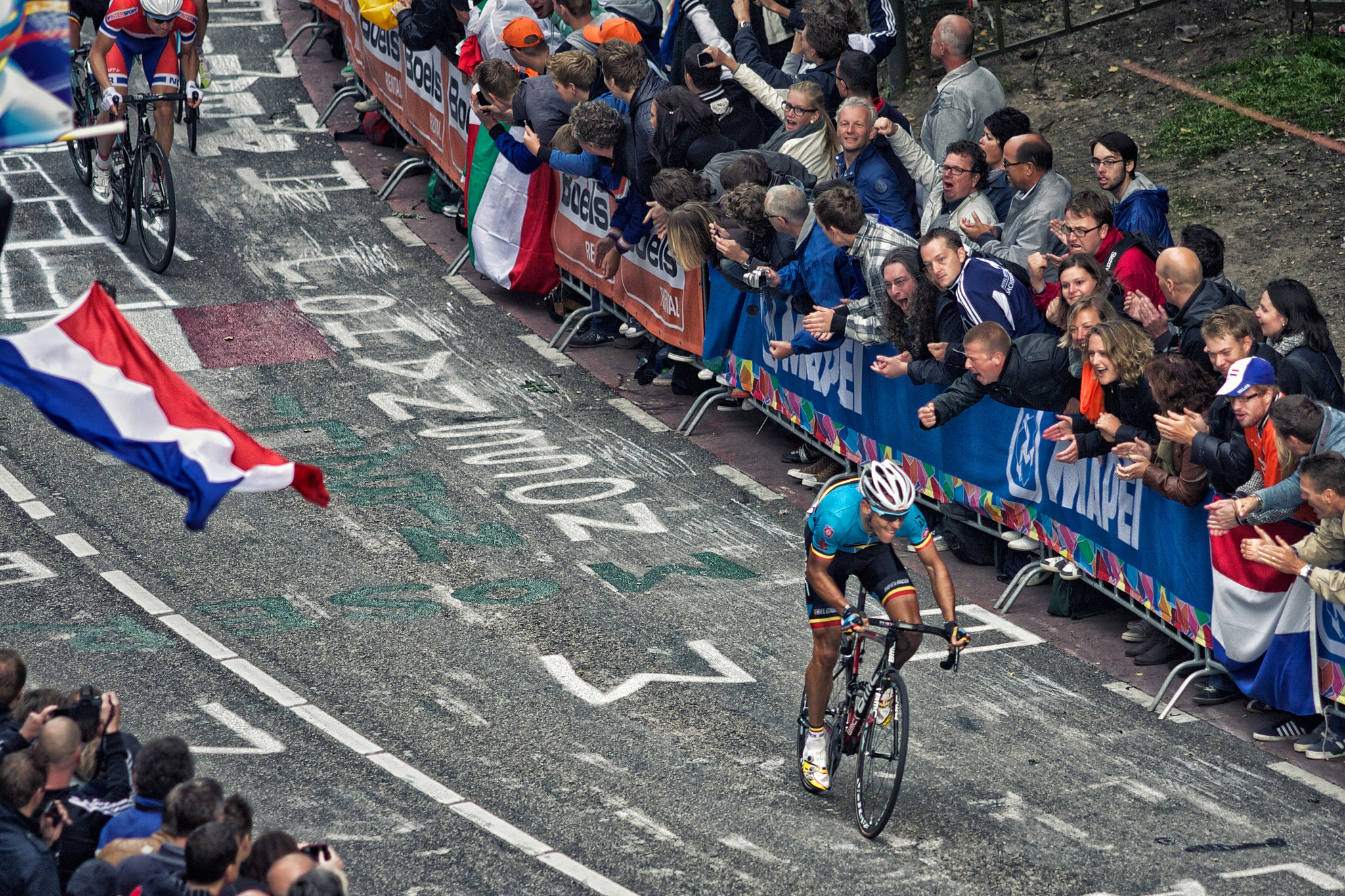
Philippe Gilbert riding up the hill in the finale of the 2012 UCI Road World Championships

The present course features more than 30 short climbs which arrive in faster succession as the race progresses, giving riders little time to recover between hills. There are 25 climbs covered in the last 165 km (103 mi) of the race, with eight coming in the final 45 km (28 mi). The steepest are the Cauberg, Keutenberg, and Eyserbosweg. Some ascents reach a maximum gradient of 22% (Keutenberg), while others are more gently sloped. Unlike the cobbled bergs in the Tour of Flanders, the hills in Limburg are all asphalted.

Cycling journalist Peter Easton detailed the mathematical difficulty of the course:

... applying logic to overcome a sense of incomprehension is the key to understanding this race. And there is truth in numbers. Six of the climbs come in the first 92 kilometers—one every 15.2 kilometres. The remaining 25 come over the final 165 kilometres. That's one every 6.6 kilometres. Breaking it down further, the final hour of racing has eight climbs in 42 kilometres. Now we're down to one every 5.25 km. At 40 km/h, that's one every 7 ½ minutes. Not overly funny, and definitely all business.

— Peter Easton, PEZ Cycling News

The full list of hills covered in the 2015 Amstel Gold Race:

Hills of the Amstel Gold Race (2015 Edition)
Number	Name	Kilometre	Location	Length (m)	Average gradient (%)
1	Slingerberg	9	Geulle	1200	5.4
2	Adsteeg	14	Beek	500	5.4
3	Lange Raarberg	22	Meerssen	1300	4.5
4	Bergseweg	38	Voerendaal	2700	3.3
5	Sibbergrubbe	50	Valkenburg	2100	4.1
6	Cauberg	54	Valkenburg	1200	5.8
7	Geulhemmerweg	59	Valkenburg	1000	6.2
8	Wolfsberg	78	Noorbeek	800	4.4
9	Loorberg	81	Slenaken	1500	5.5
10	Schweibergerweg	93	Gulpen	2900	3.9
11	Camerig	99	Vijlen	4300	3.8
12	Drielandenpunt	110	Vaals	3700	3.7
13	Gemmenich	114	Blieberg	900	6.4
14	Vijlenerbos	118	Vaals	1800	5.1
15	Eperheide	127	Epen	2300	4.1
16	Gulperberg	135	Gulpen	700	8.1
17	Plettenbergweg	142	Eys	1000	4.2
18	Eyserweg	144	Eys	2200	4.3
19	Huls	148	Simpelveld	1000	7.7
20	Vrakelberg	154	Voerendaal	700	7.9
21	Sibbergrubbe	161	Valkenburg	2100	4.1
22	Cauberg	166	Valkenburg	1200	5.8
23	Geulhemmerweg	170	Valkenburg	1000	6.2
24	Bemelerberg	183	Bemelen	900	5.0
25	Loorberg	198	Slenaken	1500	5.5
26	Gulperberg	208	Gulpen	700	8.1
27	Kruisberg	217	Wahlwiller	800	7.5
28	Eyserbosweg	219	Eys	1100	8.1
29	Fromberg	222	Fromberg	1600	4.0
30	Keutenberg	227	Keutenberg	700	9.4
31	Cauberg	237	Valkenburg	1200	5.8
32	Geulhemmerweg	242	Valkenburg	1000	6.2
33	Bemelerberg	250	Bemelen	900	5.0
34	Cauberg	255	Valkenburg	1200	5.8

=== Nervous course ===
The race is the Netherlands' largest professional event but has faced criticism regarding the safety of its course. The route runs on narrow roads through densely populated suburbs and villages. Due to high population density, many vehicles are parked on the streets. Much of the course is urban, incorporating traffic calming devices such as speed bumps, pinches, bollards, ramps, chicanes, refuge islands, and roundabouts. This layout prompted Scottish rider Robert Millar to call it the "Tour of the Roundabouts". Crashes are frequent occurrences.

== Winners ==
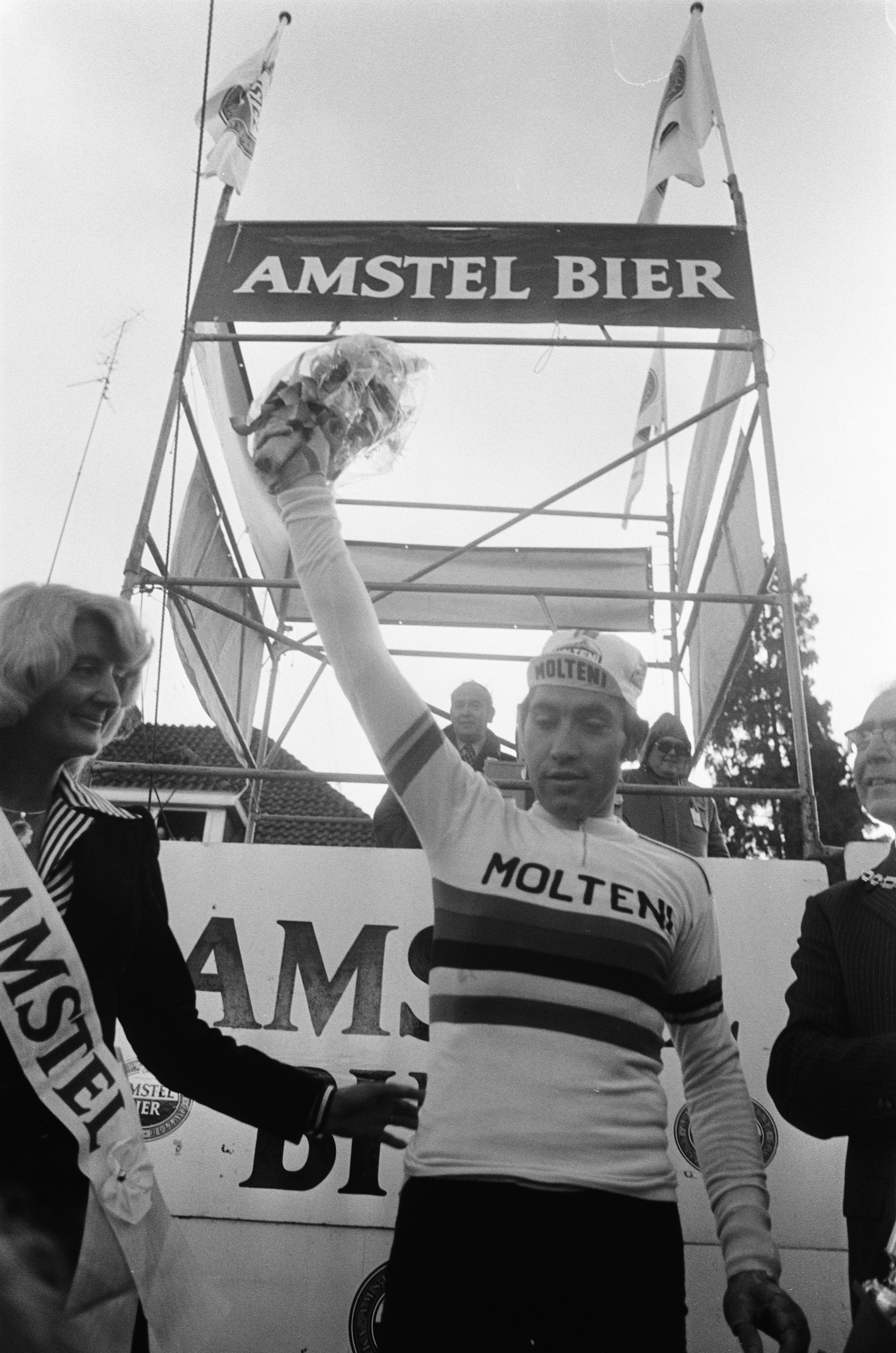
Eddy Merckx, in the rainbow jersey, on the podium after winning the 1975 Amstel Gold Race

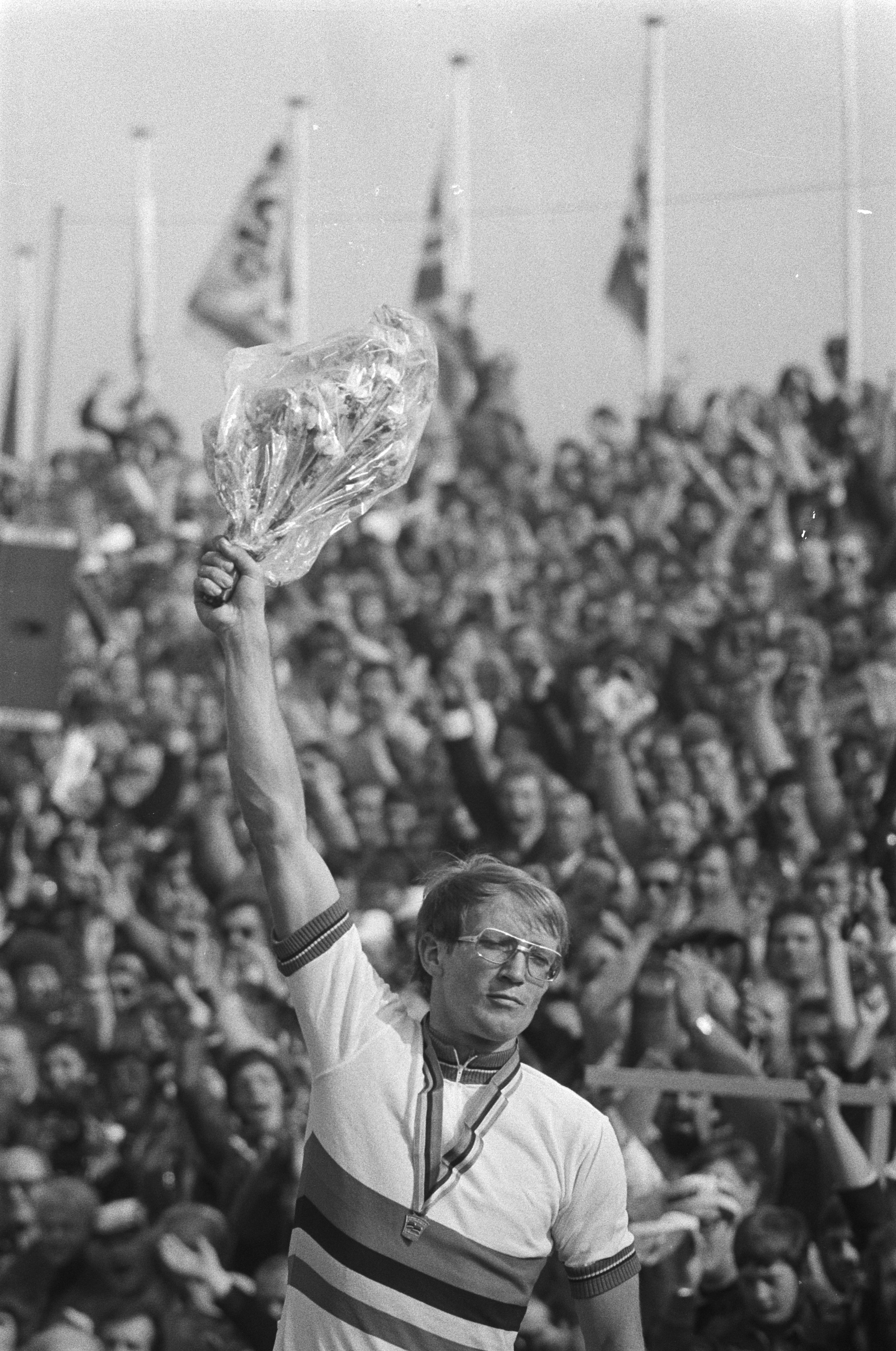
Record winner Jan Raas (pictured after winning the world title in 1979 in Valkenburg) won the Amstel Gold Race five times.

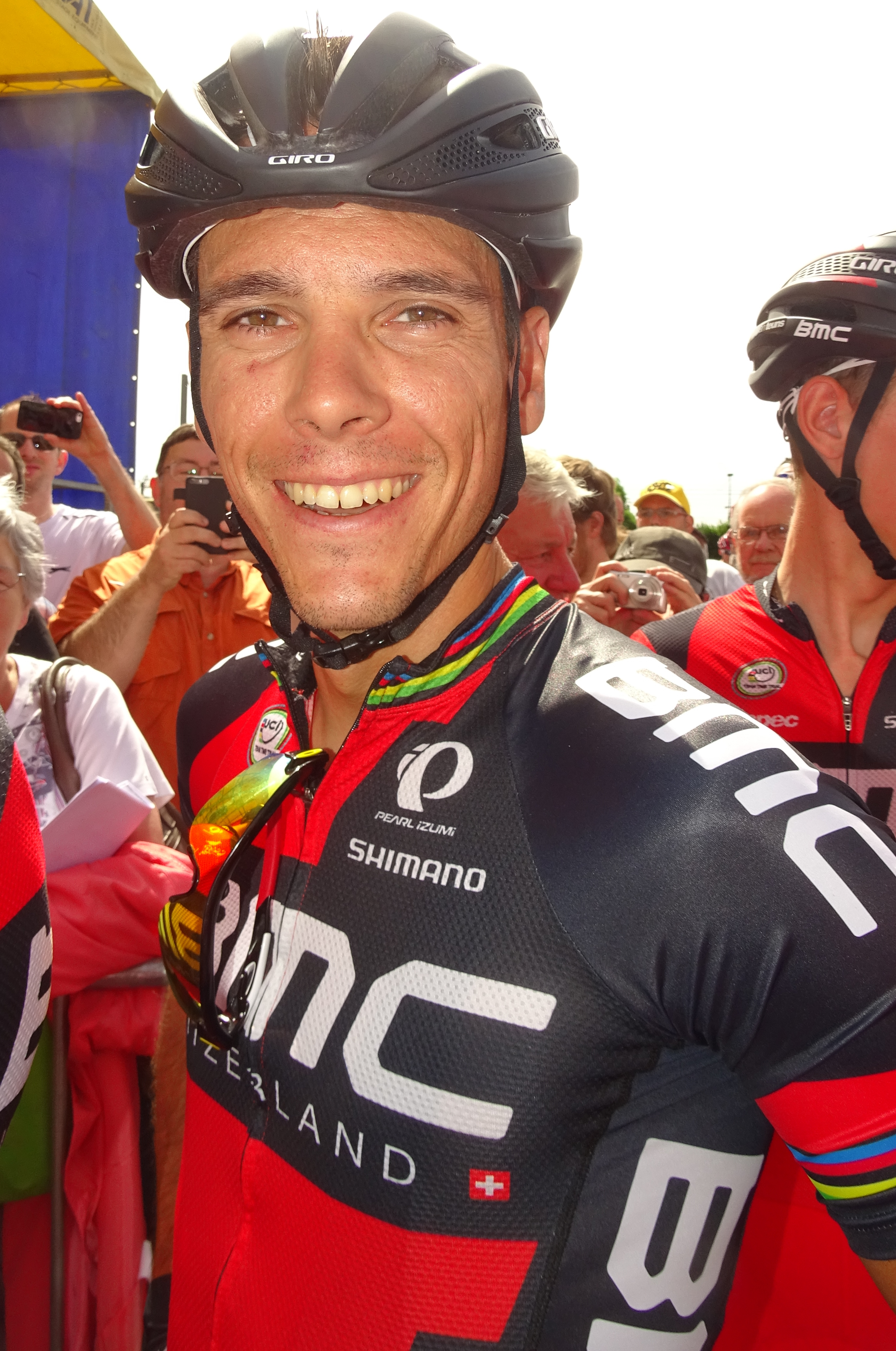
Four-time winner Philippe Gilbert

Year	Country	Rider	Team
1966	France	Jean Stablinski	Ford–Hutchinson
1967	Netherlands	Arie den Hartog	Bic–Hutchinson
1968	Netherlands	Harry Steevens	Willem II–Gazelle
1969	Belgium	Guido Reybrouck	Faemino–Faema
1970	Belgium	Georges Pintens	Dr. Mann–Grundig
1971	Belgium	Frans Verbeeck	Watney–Avia
1972	Belgium	Walter Planckaert	Watney–Avia
1973	Belgium	Eddy Merckx	Molteni
1974	Netherlands	Gerrie Knetemann	Gan–Mercier–Hutchinson
1975	Belgium	Eddy Merckx	Molteni
1976	Belgium	Freddy Maertens	Flandria–Velda
1977	Netherlands	Jan Raas	Frisol–Gazelle–Thirion
1978	Netherlands	Jan Raas	TI–Raleigh–McGregor
1979	Netherlands	Jan Raas	TI–Raleigh–McGregor
1980	Netherlands	Jan Raas	TI–Raleigh–Creda
1981	France	Bernard Hinault	Renault–Elf–Gitane
1982	Netherlands	Jan Raas	TI–Raleigh–Campagnolo
1983	Australia	Phil Anderson	Peugeot–Shell–Michelin
1984	Netherlands	Jacques Hanegraaf	Kwantum–Decosol–Yoko
1985	Netherlands	Gerrie Knetemann	Skil–Sem–Kas–Miko
1986	Netherlands	Steven Rooks	PDM–Gin MG–Ultima–Concorde
1987	Netherlands	Joop Zoetemelk	Superconfex–Kwantum–Yoko–Colnago
1988	Netherlands	Jelle Nijdam	Superconfex–Yoko–Opel–Colnago
1989	Belgium	Eric Van Lancker	Panasonic–Isostar–Colnago–Agu
1990	Netherlands	Adri van der Poel	Weinmann–SMM Uster–Merckx
1991	Netherlands	Frans Maassen	Buckler–Colnago–Decca
1992	Germany	Olaf Ludwig	Panasonic–Sportlife
1993	Switzerland	Rolf Järmann	Ariostea
1994	Belgium	Johan Museeuw	GB–MG Maglificio–Bianchi
1995	Switzerland	Mauro Gianetti	Polti–Vaporetto
1996	Italy	Stefano Zanini	Gewiss Playbus
1997	Denmark	Bjarne Riis	Team Telekom
1998	Switzerland	Rolf Järmann	Casino–Ag2r
1999	Netherlands	Michael Boogerd	Rabobank
2000	Germany	Erik Zabel	Team Telekom
2001	Netherlands	Erik Dekker	Rabobank
2002	Italy	Michele Bartoli	Fassa Bortolo
2003	Kazakhstan	Alexander Vinokourov	Team Telekom
2004	Italy	Davide Rebellin	Gerolsteiner
2005	Italy	Danilo Di Luca	Liquigas–Bianchi
2006	Luxembourg	Fränk Schleck	Team CSC
2007	Germany	Stefan Schumacher	Gerolsteiner
2008	Italy	Damiano Cunego	Lampre
2009	Russia	Serguei Ivanov	Team Katusha
2010	Belgium	Philippe Gilbert	Omega Pharma–Lotto
2011	Belgium	Philippe Gilbert	Omega Pharma–Lotto
2012	Italy	Enrico Gasparotto	Astana
2013	Czech Republic	Roman Kreuziger	Saxo–Tinkoff
2014	Belgium	Philippe Gilbert	BMC Racing Team
2015	Poland	Michał Kwiatkowski	Etixx–Quick-Step
2016	Italy	Enrico Gasparotto	Wanty–Groupe Gobert
2017	Belgium	Philippe Gilbert	Quick-Step Floors
2018	Denmark	Michael Valgren	Astana
2019	Netherlands	Mathieu van der Poel	Corendon–Circus
2020	No race due to COVID-19 pandemic		
2021	Belgium	Wout van Aert	Team Jumbo–Visma
2022	Poland	Michał Kwiatkowski	INEOS Grenadiers
2023	Slovenia	Tadej Pogačar	UAE Team Emirates
2024	Great Britain	Tom Pidcock	INEOS Grenadiers
2025	Denmark	Mattias Skjelmose	Lidl–Trek
2026	Belgium	Remco Evenepoel	Red Bull–Bora–Hansgrohe

=== Multiple winners ===
Riders in italics are still active.

Multiple winners
Wins	Rider	Editions
5	Jan Raas (NED)	1977, 1978, 1979, 1980, 1982
4	Philippe Gilbert (BEL)	2010, 2011, 2014, 2017
2	Eddy Merckx (BEL)	1973, 1975
2	Gerrie Knetemann (NED)	1974, 1985
2	Rolf Järmann (SUI)	1993, 1998
2	Enrico Gasparotto (ITA)	2012, 2016
2	Michał Kwiatkowski (POL)	2015, 2022

=== Wins per country ===
Wins per country
Wins	Country
18	Netherlands
15	Belgium
7	Italy
3	Denmark; Germany; Switzerland
2	France; Poland
1	Australia; Czech Republic; Great Britain; Kazakhstan; Luxembourg; Russia; Slovenia

== Women's race ==
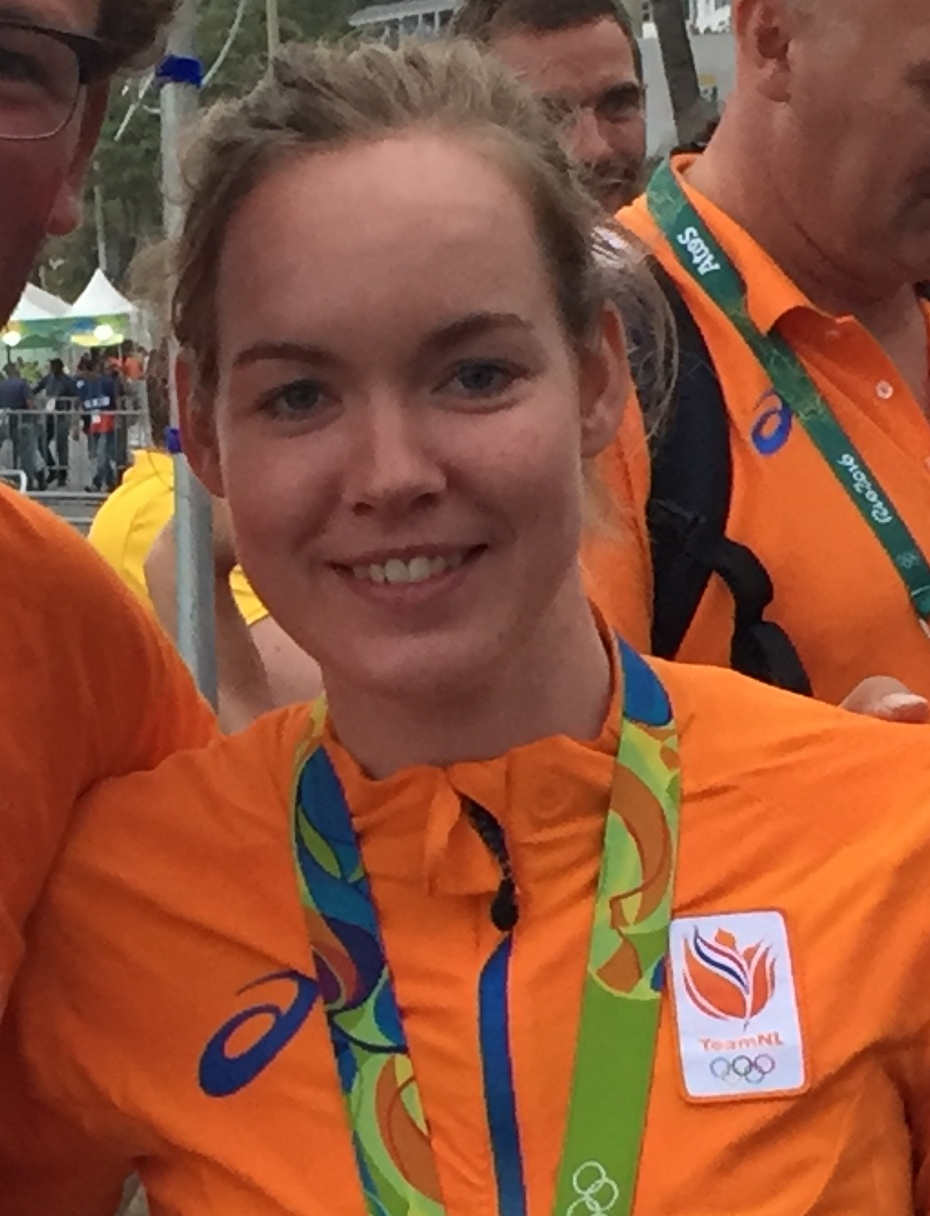
Anna van der Breggen won the women's reboot edition in 2017.

From 2001 to 2003, three editions of the Amstel Gold Race for elite women were held. In 2003, it was part of the UCI Women's Road World Cup. The race started in Maastricht 30 minutes after the men's event. It was run over 114 km (71 mi), taking in nine climbs and similarly finishing on top of the Cauberg. The race was discontinued after the third edition, as organising the event on the same day and over largely the same roads as the men's race was considered too difficult on the irregular circuits. (Note: The 2003 women's race almost clashed with the men's event)

After a 14-year hiatus, the women's race returned in 2017, organised on the same day as the men's race at approximately half the distance. Likewise, the race starts in Maastricht and finishes in Vilt/Berg en Terblijt, Valkenburg. It features 17 categorised climbs, including four ascents of the Cauberg. Olympic road race champion Anna van der Breggen won the 2017 race with an attack 8 km (5.0 mi) from the finish.

== Cyclosportive ==
Since 2001, a Cyclosportive Amstel Gold Race has been organised annually on the day preceding the professional event. Cyclists and recreational riders can ride trajectories of 60, 100, 125, 150, 200, or 240 km (150 mi). Every distance finishes at the location of the professional race, immediately after the climb of the Cauberg. The number of participants is restricted to 15,000 to secure rider safety. In 2009, the official website crashed due to high ticket demand. In 2010, all 12,000 tickets sold out in 38 minutes.
