= Amstel Gold Race (women's race) =

Dutch cycling race

Race details
- Date: Mid April
- Region: Limburg, Netherlands
- Discipline: Road
- Competition: UCI Women's World Tour (since 2017)
- Type: One-day race, Ardennes classic
- Organiser: Flanders Classics
- Web site: www.amstelgoldrace.nl

History
- First edition: 2001
- Editions: 12 (as of 2026)
- First winner: Debby Mansveld (NED)
- Most wins: Marianne Vos (NED) (2 wins)
- Most recent: Paula Blasi (ESP)

The Amstel Gold Race is a one-day classic road cycling race held annually in the province of Limburg, Netherlands. Held in mid-April on the same day as the men's event, the race starts in Maastricht and finishes in Berg en Terblijt, Valkenburg. It features 21 categorized climbs, including four ascents of the Cauberg.

The race is the first of three Ardennes classics along with the Belgian La Flèche Wallonne Féminine and Liège–Bastogne–Liège Femmes. Riders from the Netherlands have dominated the event, winning 8 of the 12 editions held. Dutch rider Marianne Vos is the only rider to have won the event on multiple occasions.

== History ==
=== Pioneering years ===
From 2001 to 2003, three editions of the Amstel Gold Race for elite women were held. In 2003, it was part of the UCI Women's Road World Cup. The race started in Maastricht 30 minutes after the men's. It was run over 114 kilometres (71 mi), taking in nine climbs and similarly finishing on top of the Cauberg. The race was discontinued after the third edition, because organization on the same day and on largely the same roads as the men's race was considered too difficult on the irregular circuits.

=== Holland Hills Classic ===
During the discontinuation of the Amstel Gold race for women, another women's elite professional cycling race, the Holland Hills Classic, was held in Limburg. The first years the race was held in August, before moving to the spring in 2011. It had a similar route as the Amstel Gold Race and, likewise, finished in Berg en Terblijt, Valkenburg. It was organized by the Stichting Holland Ladies Tour, which also organizes the Holland Ladies Tour. The race was a 1.1 UCI event and was discontinued after the 2016 edition when it became apparent there would be a rebooted Amstel Gold Race in 2017. Marianne Vos won the event three times in 2007, 2009 and 2011.

=== Reboot of race ===
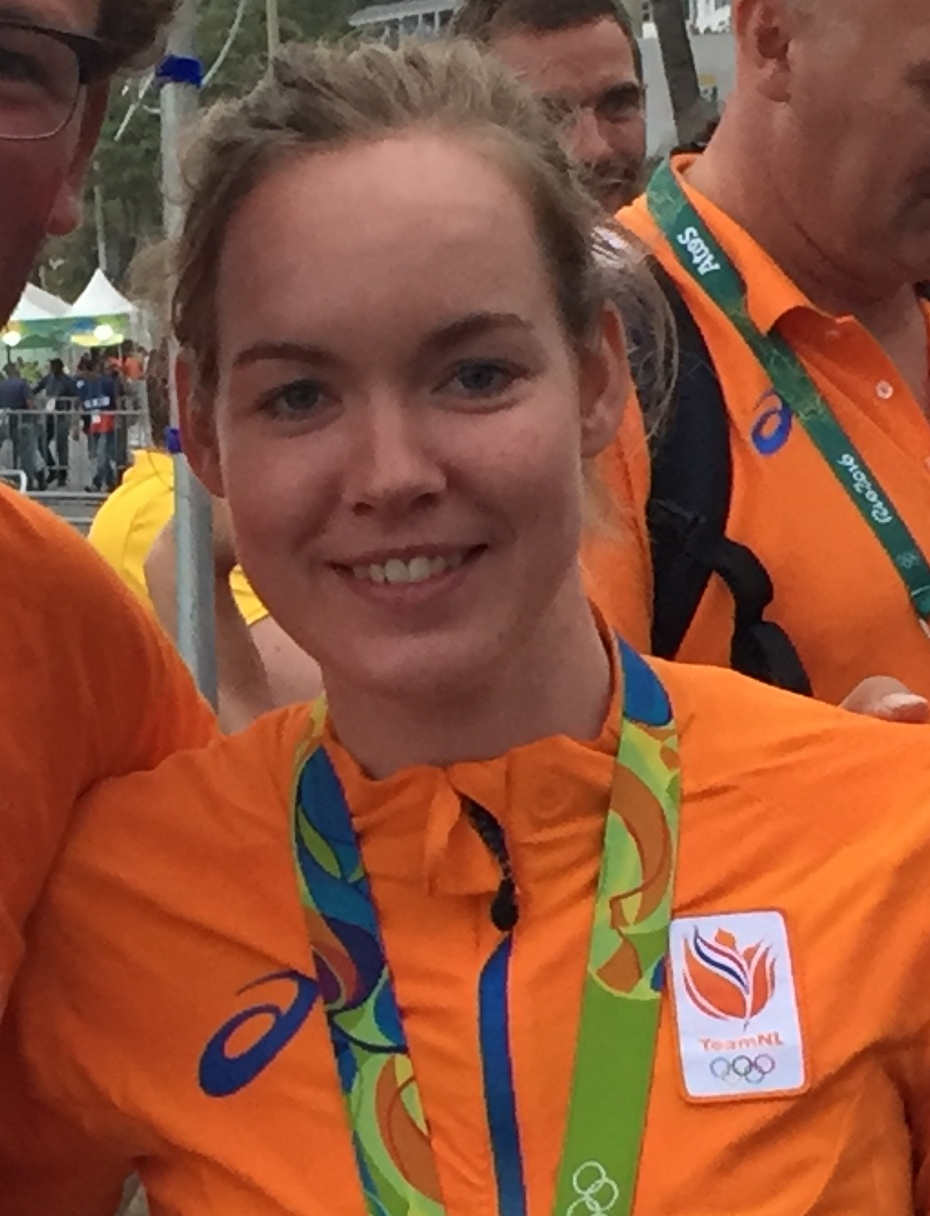
Anna van der Breggen won the women's reboot edition in 2017.

The Amstel Gold Race was rebooted in 2017 after a 14-year hiatus, with the race part of the UCI Women's World Tour. Olympic road race champion Anna van der Breggen won the 2017 edition with an attack at 8 km from the finish. Van der Breggen followed up this victory with wins in La Flèche Wallonne and Liège–Bastogne–Liège, making her the first woman to win the Ardennes triple.

In winning the 2018 race, Chantal Blaak became the first rider to take victory in the legendary rainbow jersey of the reigning world champion.

The 2021 edition was won by Marianne Vos, who had previously won the Holland Hills Classic three times.

Demi Vollering won the 2023 edition on the way to becoming the second rider after Anna van der Breggen to claim the Ardennes triple. This marked the second year in a row where a rider won both the Amstel Gold Race and La Flèche Wallonne after Marta Cavalli took back-to-back victories in 2022.

Marianne Vos became the first two-time Amstel Gold Race winner after claiming victory in an incident-packed 2024 edition. After 46 kilometres, the race was paused following a road traffic accident ahead on the course involving a police motorbike. Due to the lengthy neutralisation, three laps of the finishing circuit were removed, leading the race to be restarted with just 54 kilometres (34 mi) remaining. A large group came to the finish for a bunch sprint where Lorena Wiebes threw her arms up in celebration only for Vos to pip her with a bike throw to the line.

== Route ==
The race is run entirely within the boundaries of Dutch Limburg, starting in the city of Maastricht and finishing in Berg en Terblijt, 1.8 kilometres from the top of the Cauberg.

As of the 2025 edition, the race is 157 kilometres (98 mi) in length.

There are 21 categorised climbs on the route, including four ascents of the iconic Cauberg which features as part of an 18-kilometre circuit around Valkenburg along with the Geulhemmerberg and Bemelerberg climbs. The final lap takes a slightly different route between the final ascents of the Bemelerberg and the Cauberg, following the route the men's race has taken in recent years over the narrow Mathieu van der Poel Allee.

Categorised climbs in the 2025 Amstel Gold Race
Number	Name	Location	Length (m)	Gradient
1	Maasberg	Elsloo	600	3.9%
2	Adsteeg	Beek	500	5.4%
3	Bergseweg	Voerendaal	2700	3.3%
4	Korenweg	Ubachsberg	300	8.6%
5	Nijswillerweg	Nijswiller	1000	3.4%
6	Kruisberg	Wahlwiller	800	7.5%
7	Eyserbosweg	Eys	1100	8.1%
8	Fromberg	Voerendaal	1600	4%
9	Keutenberg	Schin op Geul	700	9.4%
10, 13, 16, 19	Geulhemmerberg	Berg en Terblijt	1000	6.2%
11, 14, 17, 20	Bemelerberg	Bemelen	900	5%
12, 15, 18, 21	Cauberg	Valkenburg	1200	5.8%

== Winners ==
Year	Country	Rider	Team
2001	Netherlands	Debby Mansveld	Vlaanderen–T-Interim
2002	Netherlands	Leontien van Moorsel	Farm Frites–Hartol
2003	Great Britain	Nicole Cooke	Ausra Gruodis-Safi
2004–2016	No race		
2017	Netherlands	Anna van der Breggen	Boels–Dolmans
2018	Netherlands	Chantal Blaak	Boels–Dolmans
2019	Poland	Katarzyna Niewiadoma	Canyon//SRAM
2020	No race due to COVID-19 pandemic		
2021	Netherlands	Marianne Vos	Team Jumbo–Visma
2022	Italy	Marta Cavalli	FDJ Nouvelle-Aquitaine Futuroscope
2023	Netherlands	Demi Vollering	SD Worx
2024	Netherlands	Marianne Vos	Visma–Lease a Bike
2025	Netherlands	Mischa Bredewold	Team SD Worx–Protime
2026	Spain	Paula Blasi	UAE Team ADQ

=== Multiple winners ===
Riders in italics are still active.

Wins	Rider	Editions
2	Marianne Vos (NED)	2021, 2024

=== Wins per country ===
Wins	Country
8	Netherlands
1	Italy, Poland, Spain, United Kingdom
