= Eyserbosweg =

Road in southern Netherlands

Coordinates: 50°50′37″N 5°52′25″E

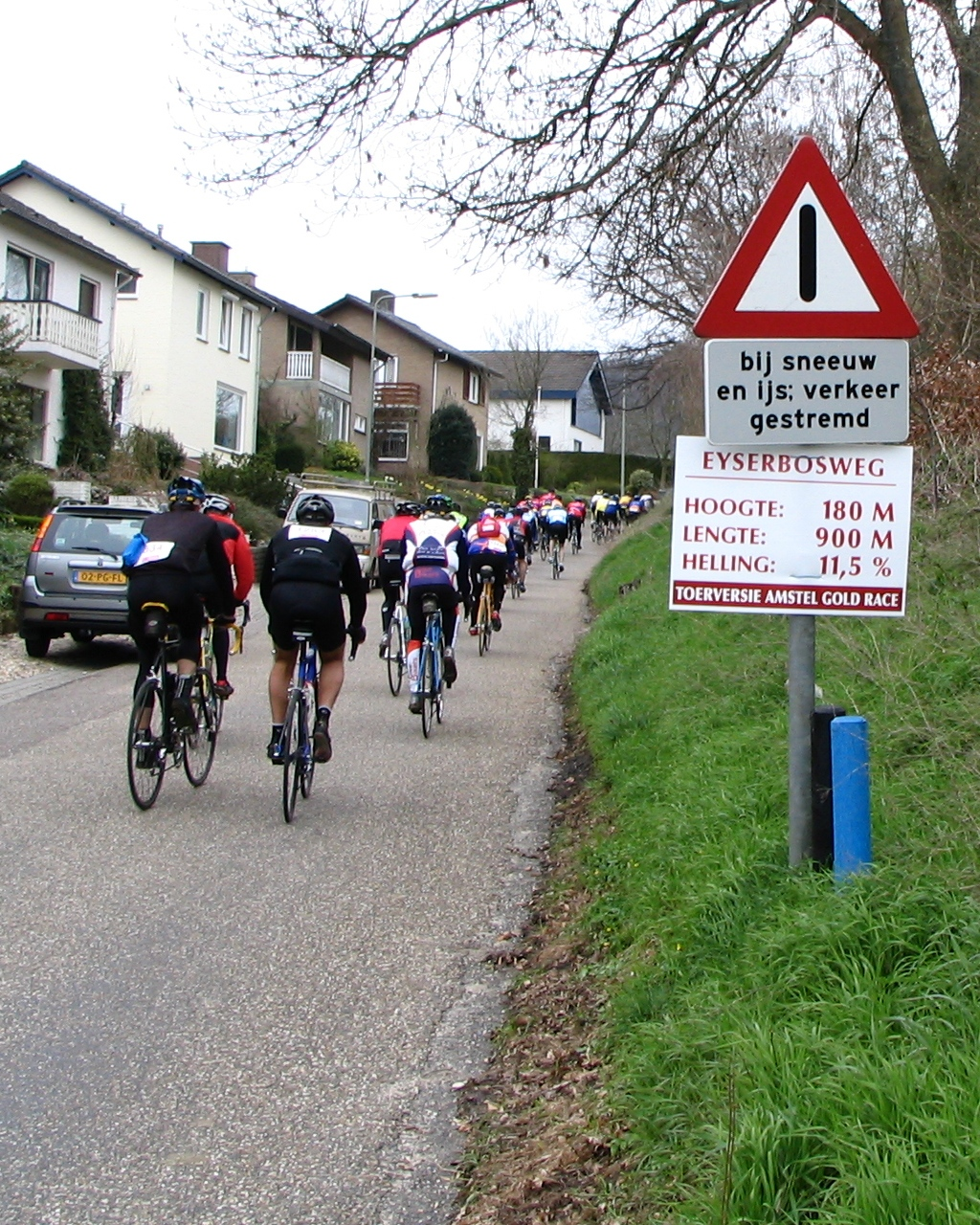
- Location: Limburg, Netherlands
- Start: Eys
- Gain in altitude: 87 m (285 ft)
- Length of climb: 1.1 km (0.68 mi)
- Maximum elevation: 195 m (640 ft)
- Average gradient: 8.1 %
- Maximum gradient: 18.0 %

The Eyserbosweg is a road located in Eys in the south of Limburg, Netherlands. The road is used as a climb in cycling racing and most famously during the Amstel Gold Race, but is also climbed during the Ster Elektrotoer, Hel van het Mergelland, Olympia's Tour, and the Eneco Tour

== Amstel Gold Race ==
The Eyserbosweg is located at 20 km before the finish of the Cauberg. The climb marks the start of the final and is used by race favourites as one of the hills to place their attacks. It’s part of the section of climbs: Kruisberg (Wahlwiller), Eyserbosweg, Fromberg and Keutenberg. After that the cyclists climb the Cauberg, Geulhemmerberg, and Bemelerberg until the finish.
