= 1966 Amstel Gold Race =

Dutch cycling race

The 1966 Amstel Gold Race was the first edition of the annual Amstel Gold Race road bicycle race, held on Sunday April 30, 1966, in the Dutch provinces of North Brabant and Limburg. The race stretched 302 kilometres instead of the supposed 249 km, with the start in Breda and the finish in Meerssen. This was because of rerouting because of Koningsdag festivities in the centers of towns and villages across the route. There were a total of 120 competitors, including Jacques Anquetil, Raymond Poulidor, Tom Simpson and winner Jean Stablinski. Eventually 30 cyclists finished the race, due to the extra kilometers that where races.

== Result ==
Final result (1–10)
Rank	Rider	Time
1	Jean Stablinski (FRA)	07:48:50
2	Bernard Van de Kerckhove (BEL)	+ 0
3	Jan Hugens (NED)	+ 0.05
4	Marcel Geeraerts (BEL)	+ 2.05
5	Peter Post (NED)	+ 2.08
6	Cor Schuuring (NED)	+ 6.40
7	Cees van Espen (NED)	+ 0
8	Constant Jongen (BEL)	+ 0
9	Rik Pauwels (BEL)	+ 0
10	Mies Stolker (NED)	+ 0
