= 1967 Amstel Gold Race =

Dutch cycling race

The 1967 Amstel Gold Race was the second edition of the annual Amstel Gold Race road bicycle race, held on Sunday, April 15, 1967, in the Dutch provinces of North Brabant and Limburg. The race stretched 213 kilometres, with the start in Helmond and the finish in Meerssen. There were a total of 137 competitors, and 49 cyclists finished the race.

== Result ==
Final result (1–10)
Rank	Rider	Time
1	Arie den Hartog (NED)	4:51:00
2	Cees Lute (NED)	+ 0
3	Harrie Steevens (NED)	+ 0
4	Wim Schepers (NED)	+ 0
5	Bart Zoet (NED)	+ 0
6	Eddy Beugels (NED)	+ 0
7	Jean-Louis Bodin (FRA)	+ 0
8	Georges Chappe (FRA)	+ 0
9	Jos van der Vleuten (NED)	+ 0
10	Jan Tummers (NED)	+ 0
