= Keutenberg =

Hill in Limburg, Netherlands

Coordinates: 50°50′37″N 5°52′25″E

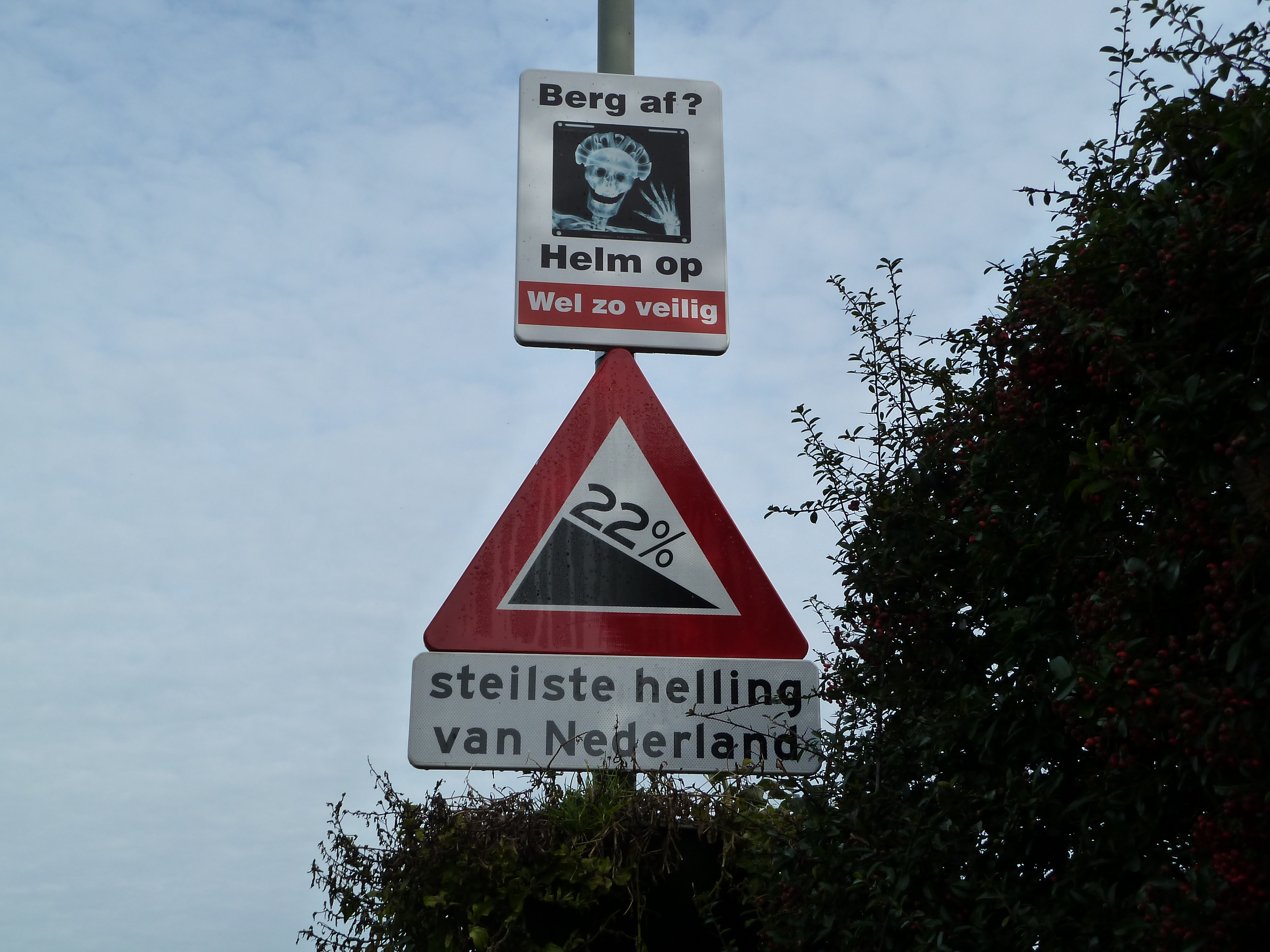
- Steepest hill of the Netherlands.
- Location: Limburg, Netherlands
- Start: Schin op Geul
- Gain in altitude: 66 m (217 ft)
- Length of climb: 700 m (2,300 ft)
- Maximum elevation: 136 m (446 ft)
- Average gradient: 9.9 %
- Maximum gradient: 22.0 %

The Keutenberg is a steep hill in the south of Limburg, Netherlands. The start of the climb is in Schin op Geul, a small village near Valkenburg aan de Geul. The Keutenberg is considered the steepest hill in the Netherlands and is famous for being part of the route of the Amstel Gold Race.

== Amstel Gold Race ==
The Keutenberg is one of the last climbs of the Amstel Gold Race before the finish, just before the last ascent of the Cauberg. It is often a decisive climb on which a small group of riders will break away from the pack and will stay with each other until the foot of the Cauberg and on. No public is permitted on the Keutenberg during the race because in the past they have often caused chaos on the steep and narrow hill.
