= 1968 Amstel Gold Race =

Bicycle road race

The 1968 Amstel Gold Race was the third edition of the annual Amstel Gold Race road bicycle race, held on Sunday September 21, 1968, in the Dutch provinces of North Brabant and Limburg. The race stretched 245 kilometres, with the start in Helmond and the finish in Elsloo. There were a total of 152 competitors, and 34 cyclists finished the race.

== Result ==
Final result (1–10)
Rank	Rider	Time
1	Harrie Steevens (NED)	5:52:29
2	Roger Rosiers (BEL)	+ 0
3	Daniel Van Ryckeghem (BEL)	+ 0.01
4	Jo de Roo (NED)	+ 0
5	Wim Schepers (NED)	+ 0
6	Jos Huysmans (BEL)	+ 0
7	Etienne Buysse (BEL)	+ 0
8	Cees Zoontjes (NED)	+ 0
9	Eddy Beugels (NED)	+ 0
10	Bernard Van de Kerckhove (BEL)	+ 0
