= 1971 Amstel Gold Race =

Edition of the cicling race

The 1971 Amstel Gold Race was the sixth edition of the annual Amstel Gold Race road bicycle race, held on Sunday March 28, 1971.

The race stretched 233 kilometres, starting in Heerlen and finishing in Meerssen. There were a total of 123 competitors, and 47 cyclists finished the race.

== Result ==
Final result (1–10)
Rank	Rider	Time
1	Frans Verbeeck (BEL)	6:11:53
2	Gerben Karstens (NED)	+ 0
3	Roger Rosiers (BEL)	+ 0.22
4	Georges Pintens (BEL)	+ 0
5	Herman Van Springel (BEL)	+ 0
6	Jos Deschoenmaecker (BEL)	+ 0
7	Gerard Vianen (NED)	+ 0
8	Roger Swerts (BEL)	+ 0
9	Jos Spruyt (BEL)	+ 1.32
10	Jan Krekels (NED)	+ 0
