= 1969 Amstel Gold Race =

Dutch cycling race

Amstel Gold Race 1969 with Eddy Merckx (in Dutch)

The 1969 Amstel Gold Race was the fourth edition of the annual Amstel Gold Race road bicycle race, held on Sunday April 18, 1969, in the Dutch provinces of North Brabant and Limburg. The race stretched 259 kilometres, with the start in Helmond and the finish in Meerssen. There were a total of 132 competitors, and 36 cyclists finished the race.

== Result ==
Final result (1–10)
Rank	Rider	Time
1	Guido Reybrouck (BEL)	6:21:03
2	Jos Huysmans (BEL)	+ 0
3	Eddy Merckx (BEL)	+ 0.16
4	Eric Leman (BEL)	+ 0
5	Willy Vekemans (BEL)	+ 0
6	Georges Pintens (BEL)	+ 0
7	Roger Rosiers (BEL)	+ 0
8	Gerard Vianen (NED)	+ 0.25
9	Valeer van Sweevelt (BEL)	+ 0.40
10	Jaak Frijters (NED)	+ 0
