= Amstel Gold Race =

Amstel Gold Race may refer to:

- Amstel Gold Race (men's race)
- Amstel Gold Race (women's race)
