= Jan Hugens =

Dutch cyclist

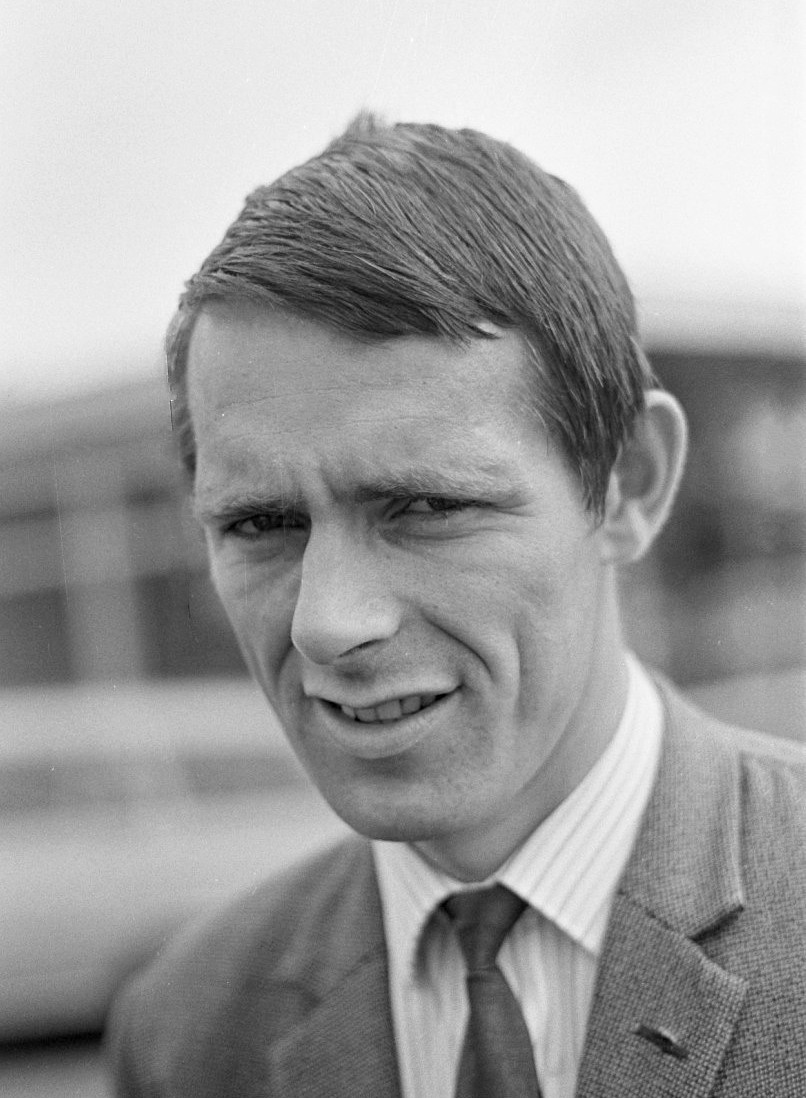
- Jan Hugens in 1968

Personal information
- Born: 22 March 1939 Heerlen, the Netherlands
- Died: 12 March 2011 (aged 71) Amstenrade, the Netherlands
- Height: 1.84 m (6 ft 0 in)
- Weight: 83 kg (183 lb)

Sport
- Sport: Cycling

Johannes Joseph "Jan" Hugens (22 March 1939 – 12 March 2011) was a Dutch road cyclist who was active between 1958 and 1968. He won individual stages of the Olympia's Tour in 1958 and 1959 and finished second overall in the Tour of Yugoslavia in 1958. Two years later he qualified for two events at the 1960 Summer Olympics and finished 38th in the individual road race and 4th in the 100 km team time trial. The same year he turned professional, but raced without a team until 1962 when he won two stages of the Tour de l'Avenir. In 1966 he was close to winning the Amstel Gold Race, but finished third after his chain derailed when switching gears near the finish line. He was selected for the Tour de France several times, but every time had to withdraw due to injuries.

After retiring from competitions he worked in road construction and as a school janitor. He died in 2011 of a kidney cancer.

== See also ==
- List of Dutch Olympic cyclists
