= Vilt =

- Village
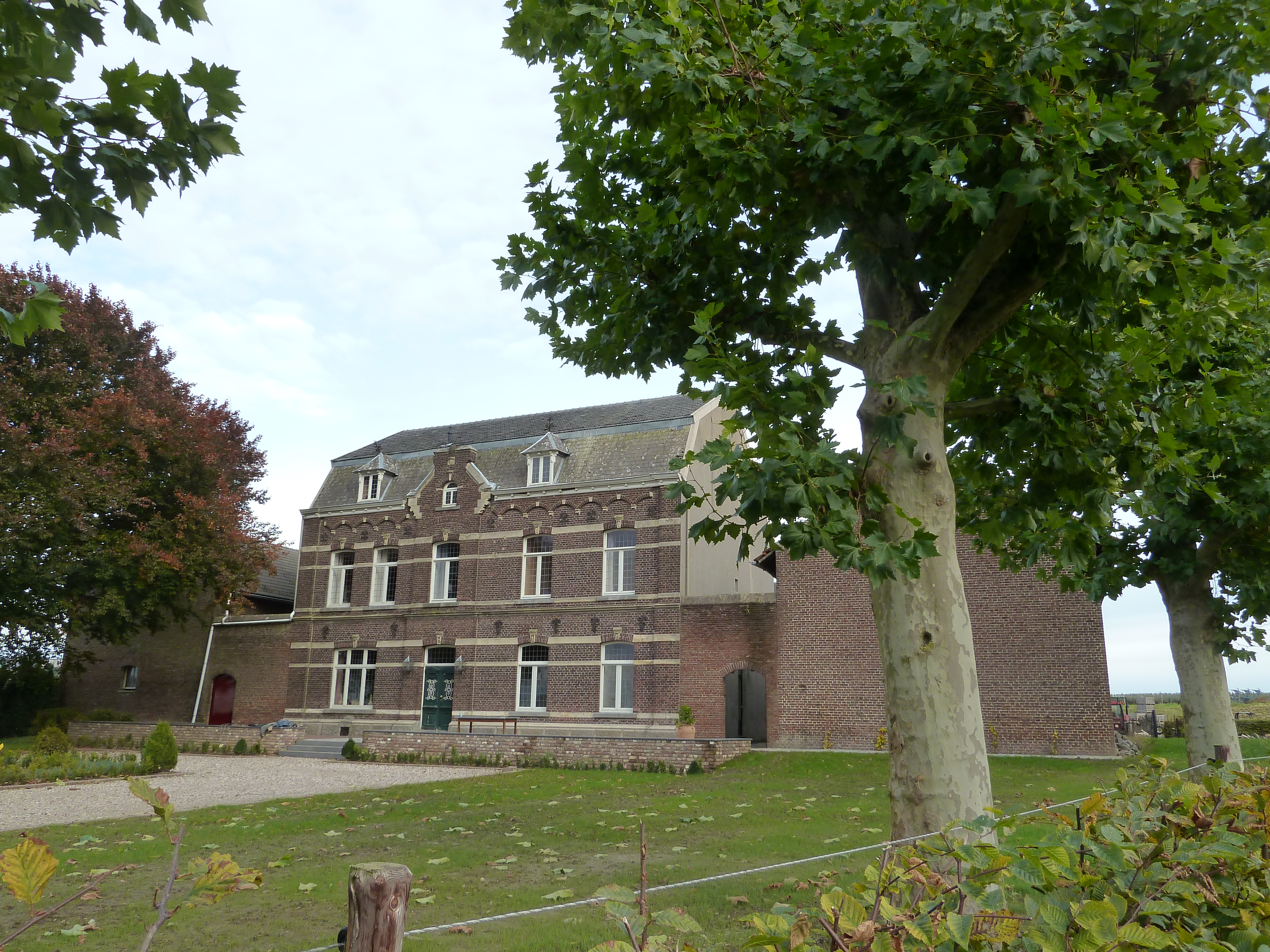
- Building in Vilt

- Location in the Netherlands Location in the province of Limburg in the Netherlands
- Coordinates: 50°51′26″N 5°48′38″E
- Country: Netherlands
- Province: Limburg
- Municipality: Valkenburg aan de Geul

Area
  - Total: 1.07 km^{2} (0.41 sq mi)
- Elevation: 123 m (404 ft)

Population (2021)
  - Total: 905
  - Density: 846/km^{2} (2,190/sq mi)
- Time zone: UTC+1 (CET)
  - Summer (DST): UTC+2 (CEST)
- Postal code: 6325
- Dialing code: 043

Vilt is a village in the Dutch province of Limburg, within the municipality of Valkenburg aan de Geul. It is located on the top of the Cauberg.

The village was first mentioned in the 14th century as Velt, and means field. Vilt was home to 164 people in 1840.

Vilt does not have its own church, and is a part of parish of Berg, but used have a primary school. The school closed in 2018.

The village also has several associations, including a football club.
