= 2013 Amstel Gold Race =

2013 UCI World Tour, race 11 of 28
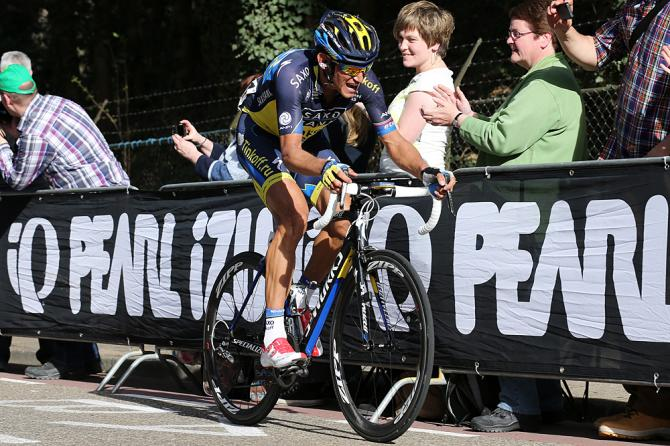

Race details
- Dates: 14 April 2013
- Stages: 1
- Distance: 251.8 km (156.5 mi)
- Winning time: 6h 35' 21"

Results
	Winner	Roman Kreuziger (CZE)	(Saxo–Tinkoff)
	Second	Alejandro Valverde (ESP)	(Movistar Team)
	Third	Simon Gerrans (AUS)	(Orica–GreenEDGE)

The 2013 Amstel Gold Race was the 48th running of the Amstel Gold Race, a single-day cycling race. It was held on 14 April 2013 over a distance of 251.8 kilometres (156.5 miles) and it was the eleventh race of the 2013 UCI World Tour season.

== Teams ==
As the Amstel Gold Race is a UCI World Tour event, all 19 UCI ProTeams were automatically invited and obligated to send a squad. Six other squads were given wildcard places into the race, and as such, formed the event's 25-team peloton.

The 19 UCI ProTeams that competed in the race:

- Ag2r–La Mondiale
- Argos–Shimano
- Astana
- Blanco Pro Cycling
- BMC Racing Team
- Cannondale
- Euskaltel–Euskadi
- FDJ
- Garmin–Sharp
- Orica–GreenEDGE
- Team Katusha
- Lampre–Merida
- Lotto–Belisol
- Movistar Team
- Omega Pharma–Quick-Step
- RadioShack–Leopard
- Saxo–Tinkoff
- Team Sky
- Vacansoleil–DCM

The 6 teams who were given wild cards:

- Accent Jobs–Wanty
- Crelan–Euphony
- IAM Cycling
- Team Europcar
- NetApp–Endura
- Topsport Vlaanderen–Baloise

== Results ==
	Rider	Team	Time	World Tour Points
1	Roman Kreuziger (CZE)	Saxo–Tinkoff	6h 35' 21"	80
2	Alejandro Valverde (ESP)	Movistar Team	+ 22"	60
3	Simon Gerrans (AUS)	Orica–GreenEDGE	+ 22"	50
4	Michał Kwiatkowski (POL)	Omega Pharma–Quick-Step	+ 22"	40
5	Philippe Gilbert (BEL)	BMC Racing Team	+ 22"	30
6	Sergio Henao (COL)	Team Sky	+ 22"	22
7	Björn Leukemans (BEL)	Vacansoleil–DCM	+ 22"	14
8	Pieter Weening (NED)	Orica–GreenEDGE	+ 22"	10
9	Enrico Gasparotto (ITA)	Astana	+ 22"	6
10	Bauke Mollema (NED)	Blanco Pro Cycling	+ 22"	2
