= Cauberg =

Hill in Valkenburg aan de Geul, the Netherlands

Coordinates: 50°51′39.82″N 5°49′25.25″E

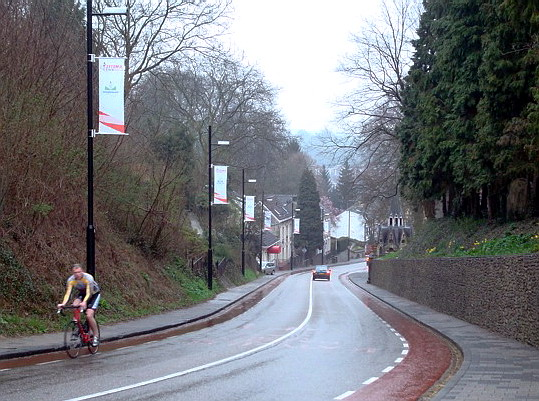
- View of Cauberg from the West
- Location: South Limburg (Netherlands)
- Start: Valkenburg aan de Geul
- Gain in altitude: 69 m (226 ft)
- Length of climb: 1.2 km (0.75 mi)
- Maximum elevation: 137 m (449 ft)
- Average gradient: 5.8 %
- Maximum gradient: 12.0 %

The Cauberg is a hill in Valkenburg aan de Geul, a town in the South Limburg region of the Netherlands. The hill played an important role in the early development of tourism in Valkenburg. Today, several major tourist attractions are situated on or nearby Cauberg. The hill's fame is mainly due to the many cycling races held there. The length of the climb is around 1,200 metres (0.7 mi), with a maximum grade of 12%.

== History ==
The first part of the word Cauberg may be derived from the Celtic word kadeir, meaning 'height' or 'hill'. Berg is a Germanic word meaning 'hill' or 'mount' as well. Perhaps the family names 'Cauberghs' and 'Van Caldenborgh' are related to Cauberg. Previously the name of the hill was also spelled 'Couberg'. Although the road via Cauberg formed the shortest connection between Valkenburg and Maastricht, in former ages most unmotorized traffic due to the steepness of the hill followed the longer but much more level route along the Geul river. The road was paved with cobblestones only in 1934; in 1969 the cobblestone surface was replaced by asphalt.

On 29 September 1954 a serious accident happened on Cauberg when the driver of a Belgian coach lost control over his vehicle after a malfunction of the brakes. The coach, which had a group of miners from the Liège area on board, who had been on an outing to Valkenburg zoo, rushed down the hill, crashed into a limestone monument at the bottom of the hill and then drove into the gable of a hotel on Grendelplein. 18 passengers and a bystander lost their lives.

In the 19th century Valkenburg developed as an early tourist destination in the Netherlands. Cauberg, with its limestone quarries, played an important role in this. Dutch architect Pierre Cuypers, who lived in Valkenburg for some years, helped design Rotspark ('Rocky Park') on the northeastern slope of Cauberg, which featured a viewing tower (1898, demolished) and an open-air theater (1916). After the Second World War a zoo and an 'aquarium grotto' were added to this. In the 1960s and 70s, Valkenburg became very popular with teenage tourists. On top of Cauberg, Europacamping became one of the largest camping sites in the country, with mostly youthful campers. Nearby on Cauberg was a racing circuit for kart racing (skelterbaan). The area was redeveloped in the 1980s and now features a holiday village, a spa center and a casino.

== Sights ==
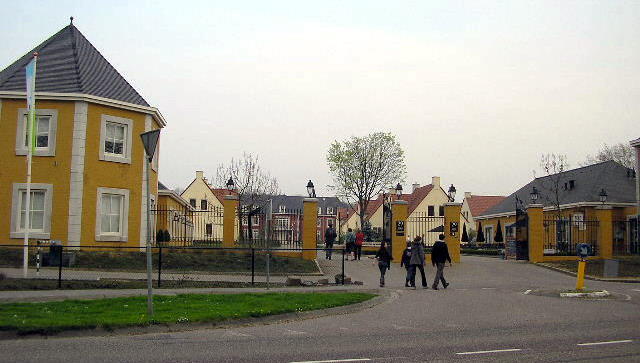
Landal holiday village

The foot of Cauberg hill is situated almost in the center of Valkenburg, outside the medieval city gate of Grendelpoort. At the bottom of the hill is one of Valkenburg's main visitor attractions, Gemeentegrot, an abandoned chalk quarry offering guided tours through a labyrinth of man-made caves which include an underground lake, limestone sculptures of prehistoric animals and charcoal drawings depicting local history scenes. Higher up the hill is a Lourdes grotto, a 1926 copy of the original grotto at Lourdes with an open air chapel.

Only a few yards further up the hill stands a memorial chapel with a carillon, commemorating the Limburgian members of the Dutch resistance that were killed during World War II. Here the underground fighters Sjeng (John) Coenen and Joep (Joe) Francotte were murdered on 5 September 1944, just before the liberation of Valkenburg.

Opposite lies a leafy hill cemetery, that features terraced graves, unique in the Netherlands, as well as a Gothic Revival graveyard chapel and some limestone mausoleums, one of which was designed by Pierre Cuypers. Halfway up the hill is situated Thermae 2000, a spa facility in a pyramidal building that opened in 1989. On the other side of the road, amidst an extension of Rotspark, is a branch of Holland Casino in a modern building with an imposing view of the town and the Geul valley. On top of the hill, close to the village of Vilt, is a Landal holiday village, built in a postmodern style to resemble a typical Limburg village, as well as a castle site.

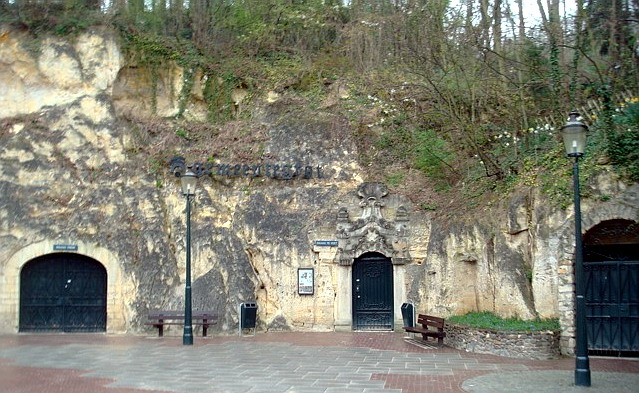
Gemeentegrot, entrance

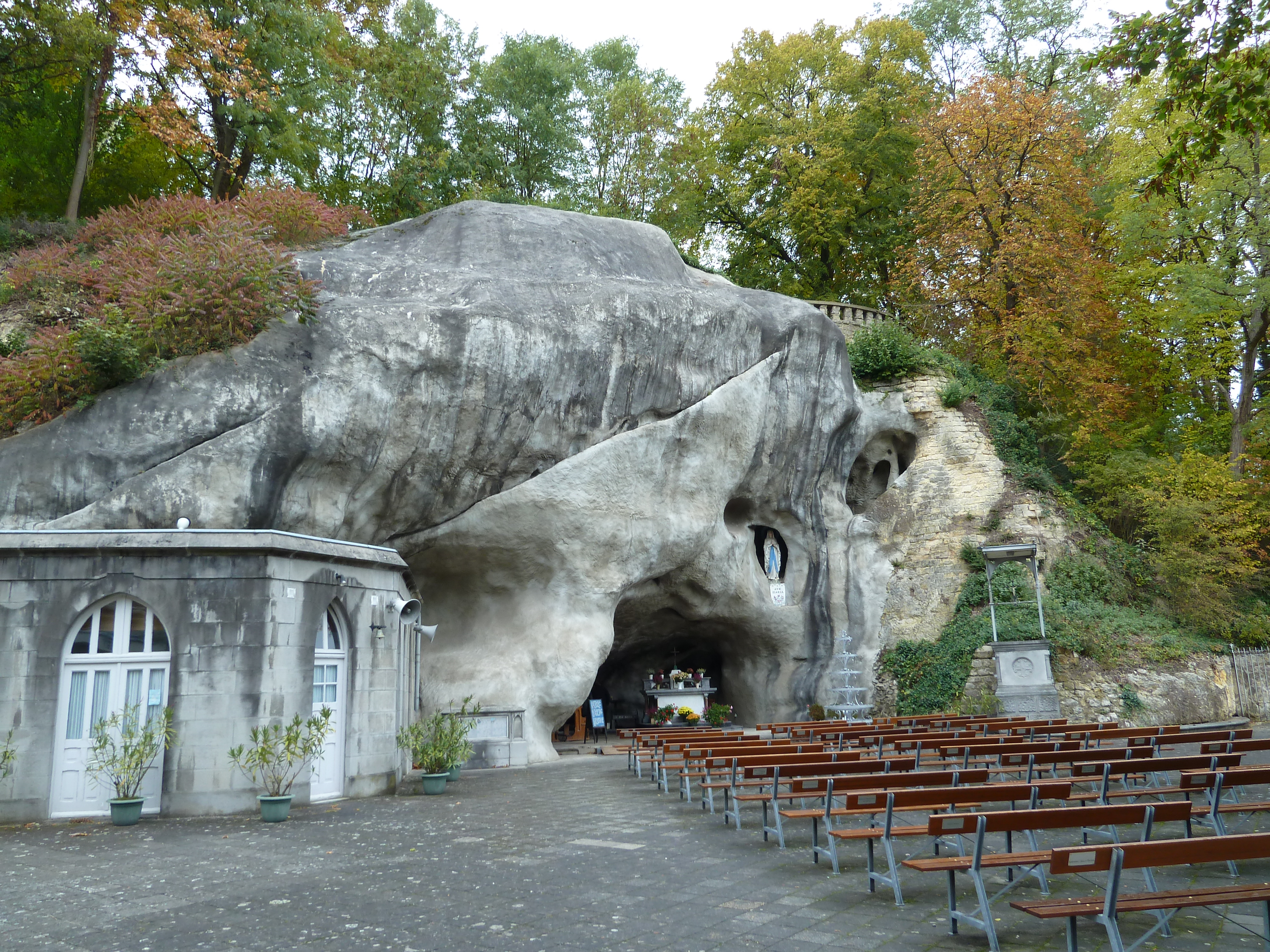
Lourdes grotto

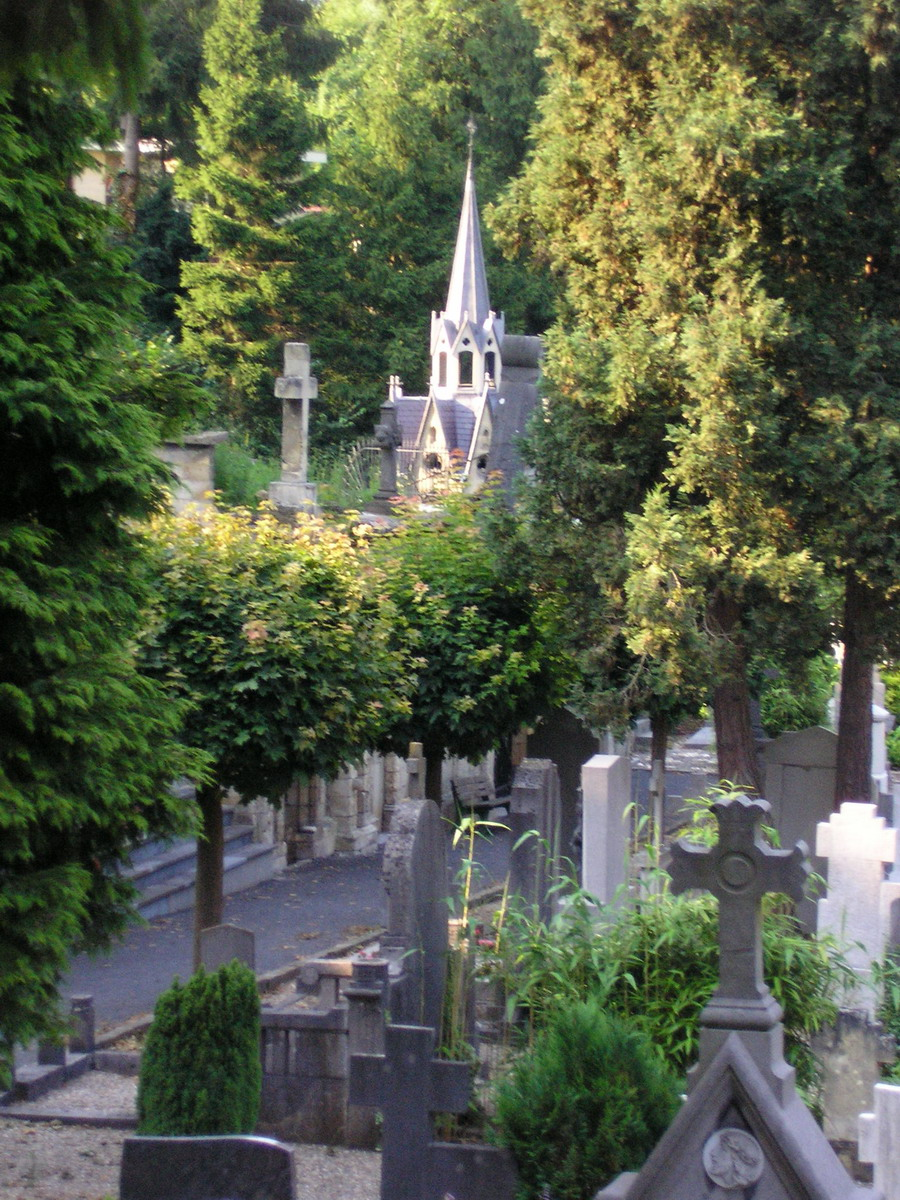
Cauberg cemetery

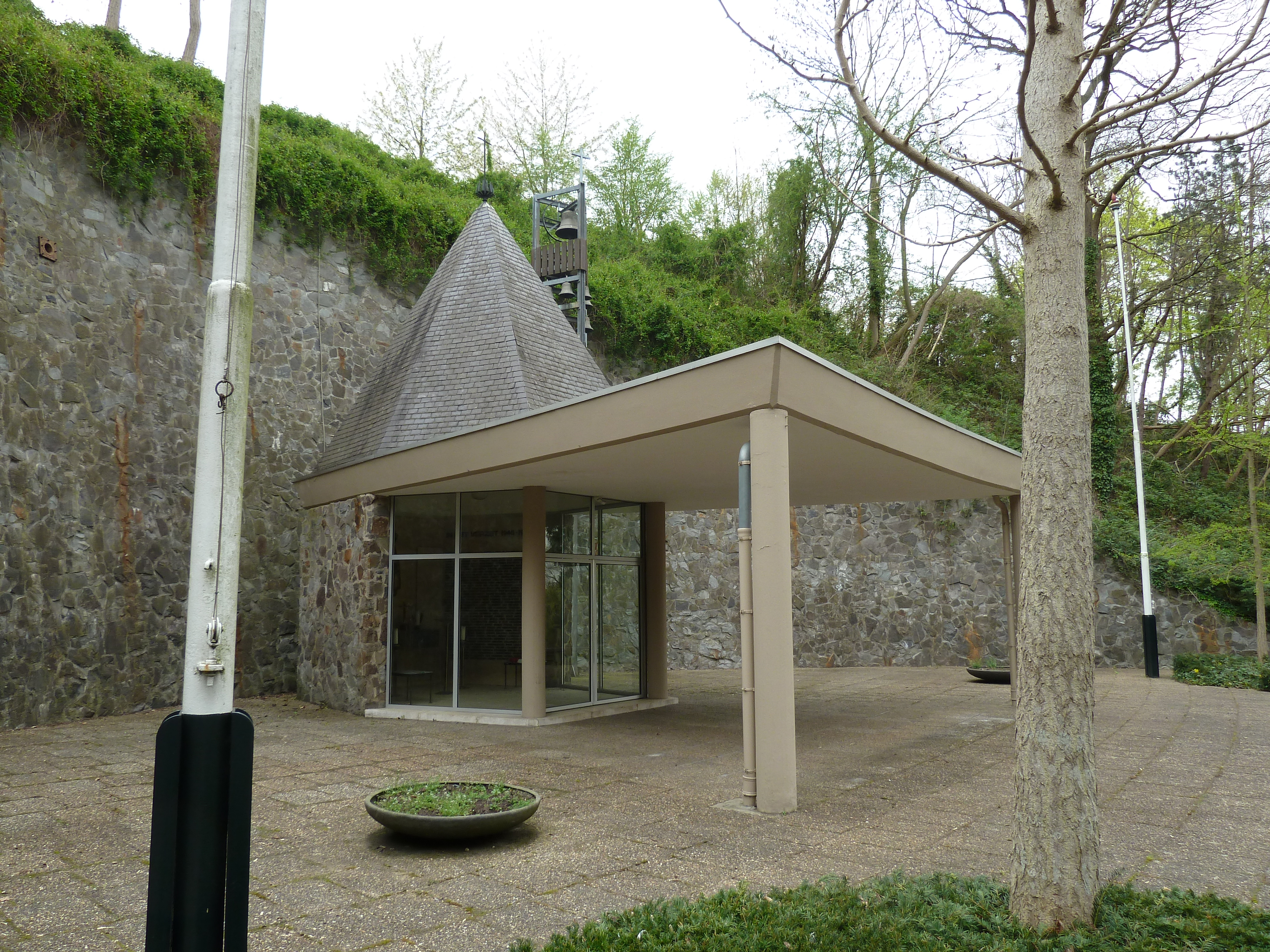
Memorial for the resistance in the province of Limburg

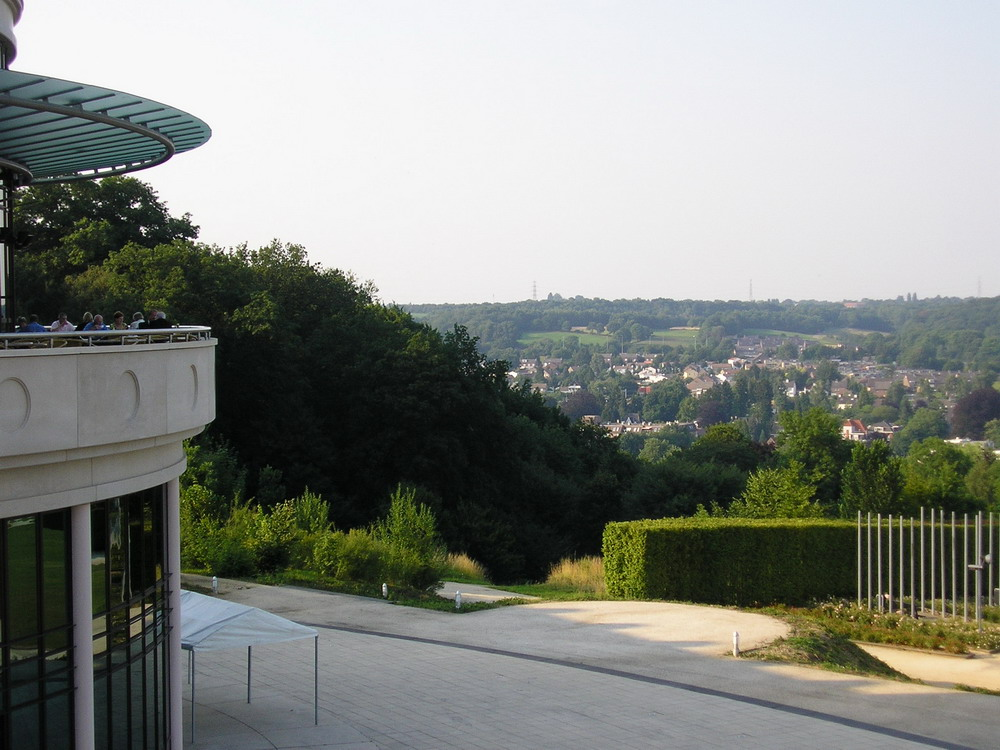
View from Holland Casino

== Road cycling ==
The Amstel Gold Race had its finish on or within a few kilometres of the Cauberg from 2003 to 2016. Now the finish is 2 kilometres further near Vilt and Berg en Terblijt and contains 3 climbs of the Cauberg in total and the last again 2 kilometres of the finish (2025 Men). The women climb the Cauberg 5 times (2025).

The Cauberg has been included in many other Dutch cycling races such as Eneco Tour, Ster ZLM Toer, Olympia's Tour and Dutch National Road Racing Championships.

Three Grand-Tours have included Cauberg in their route: the 1992 Tour de France (7th stage), the 2006 Tour de France (3rd stage) and the 2009 Vuelta a España (4th stage).

The UCI Road World Championships has included the Cauberg five times (1938, 1948, 1979, 1998 and 2012 UCI Road World Championships).

Dutch Championships cycling 1937

1938 UCI Road World Championships

Dutch Championships cycling 1943

Dutch Championships cycling 1946

1948 UCI Road World Championships

Dutch Championships cycling 1949

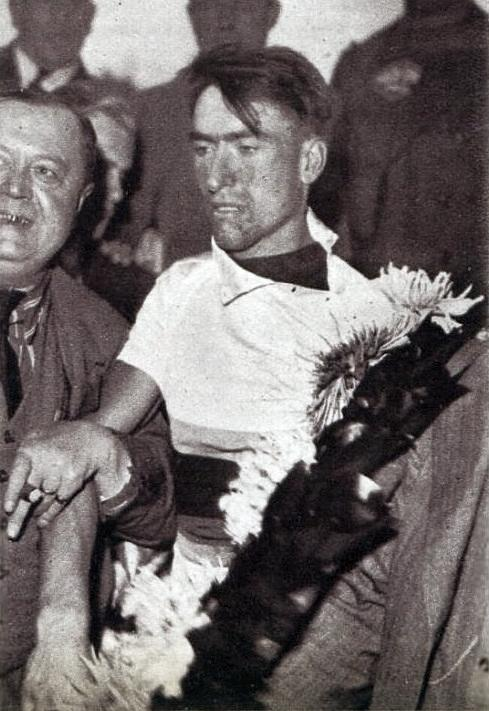
World Champions 1938 Marcel Kint

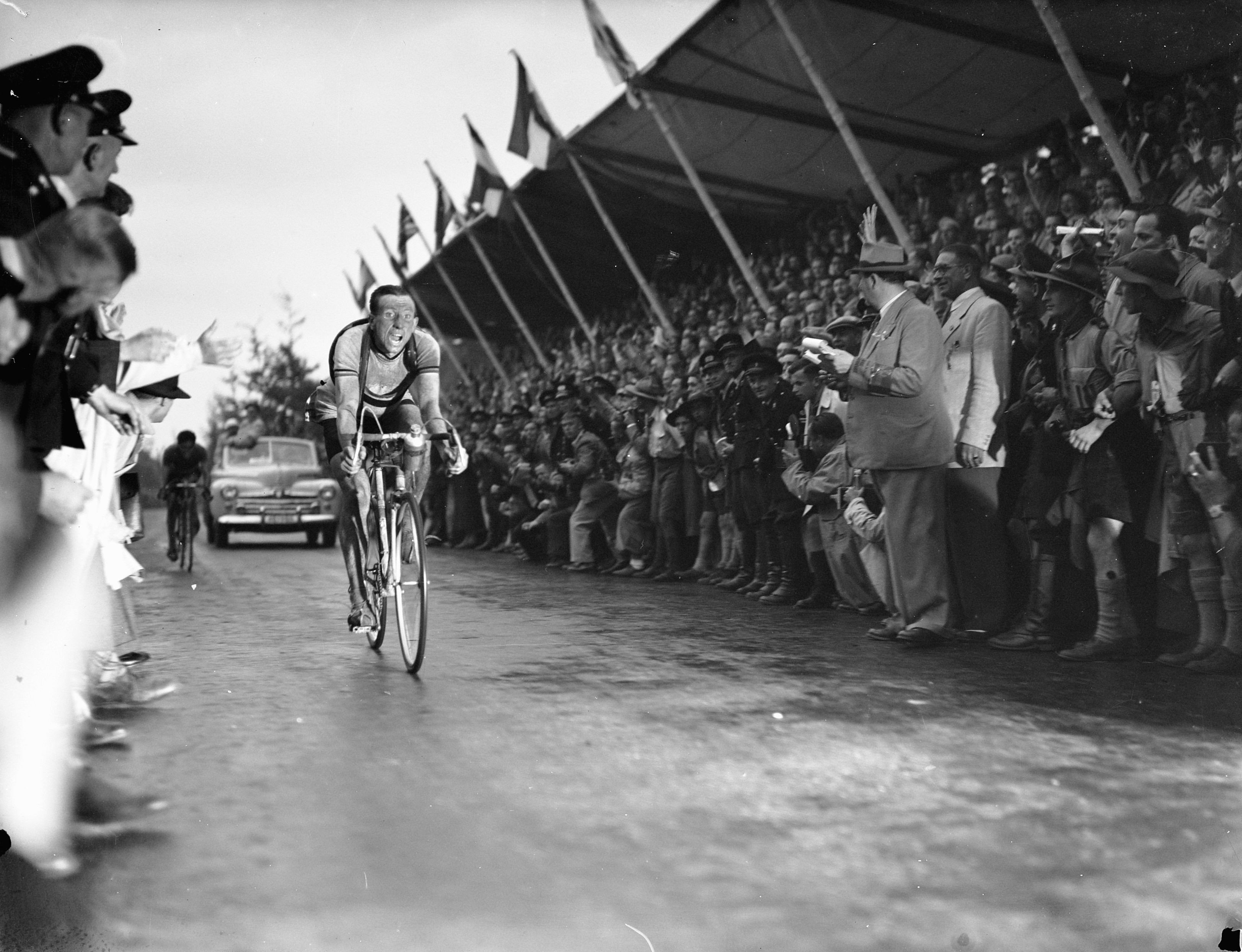
Finish of World Championships Road Cycling 1948, winner Briek Schotte

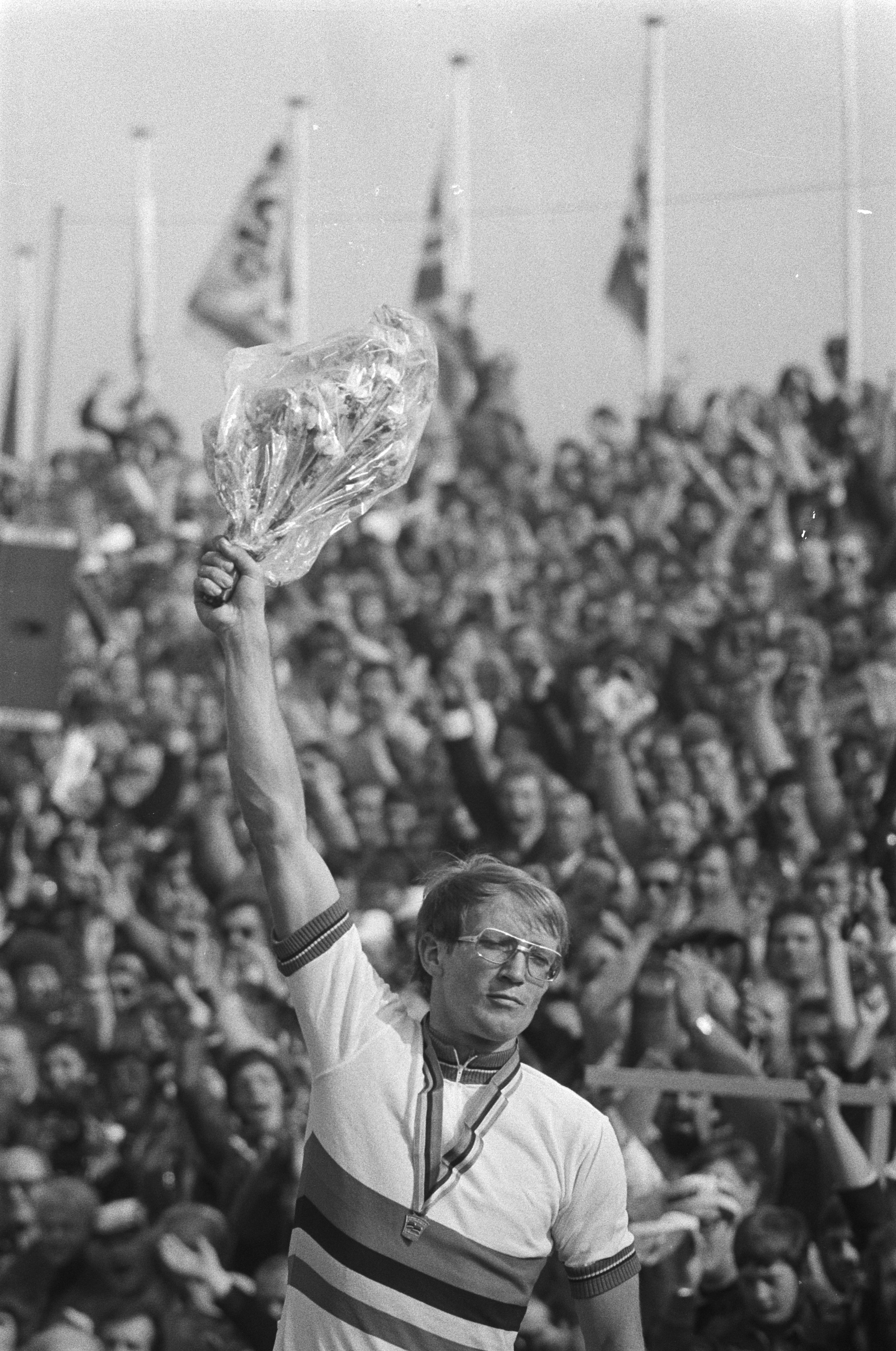
Ceremony with Jan Raas at World at Championship Road Cycling 1979

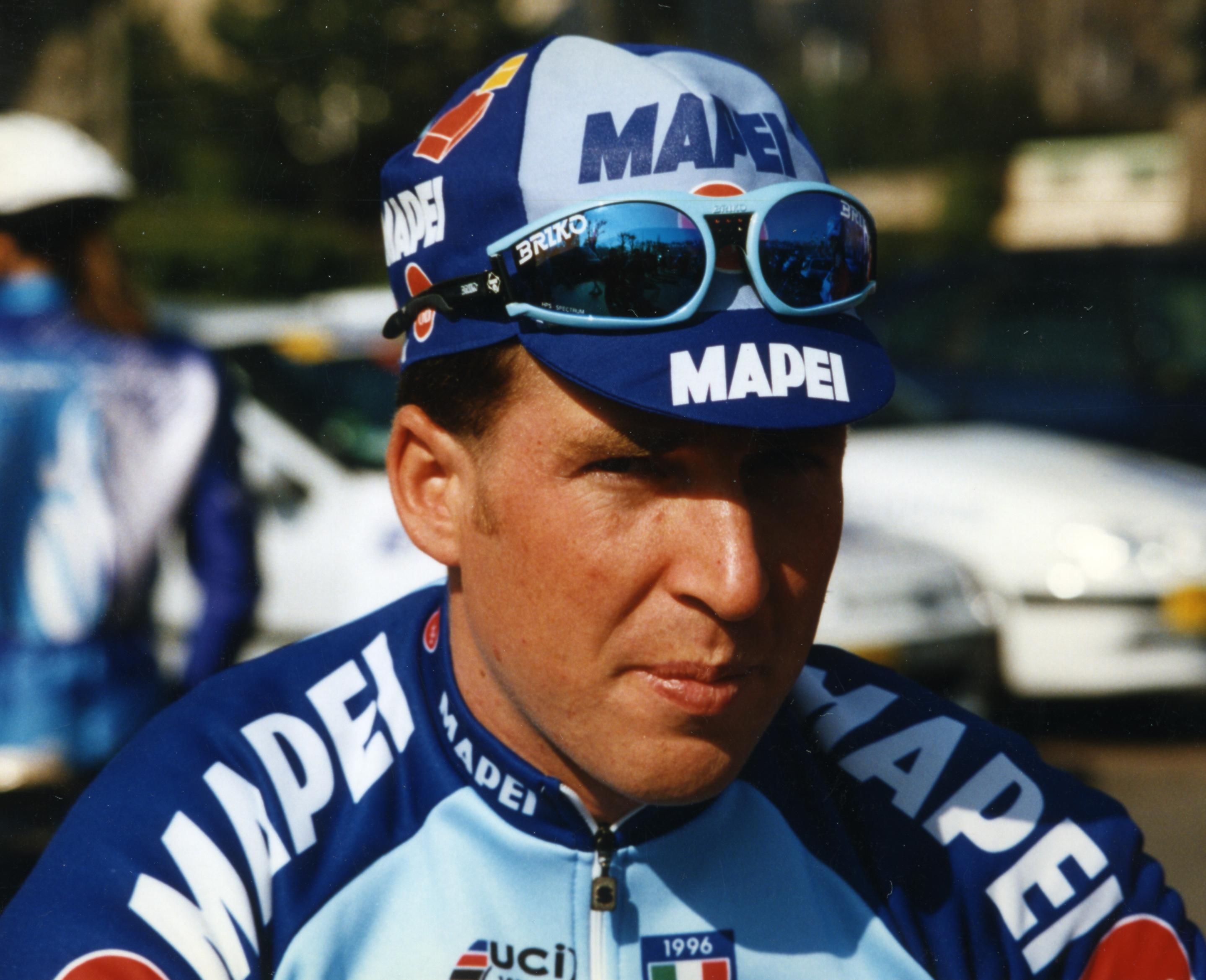
World Champion of 1998, Oscar Camenzind

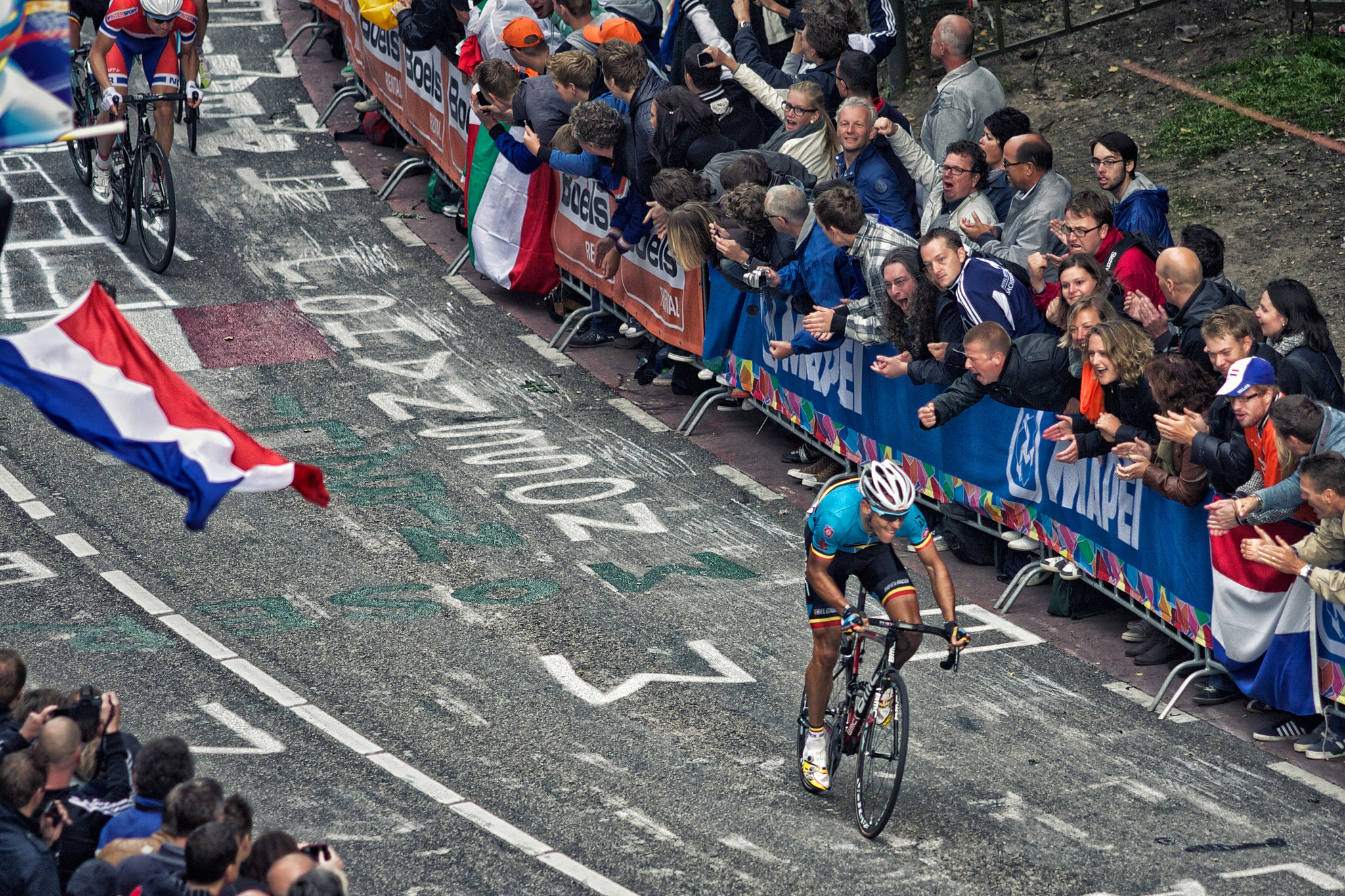
2012 UCI Road World Championships: “Mister Cauberg”, Philippe Gilbert

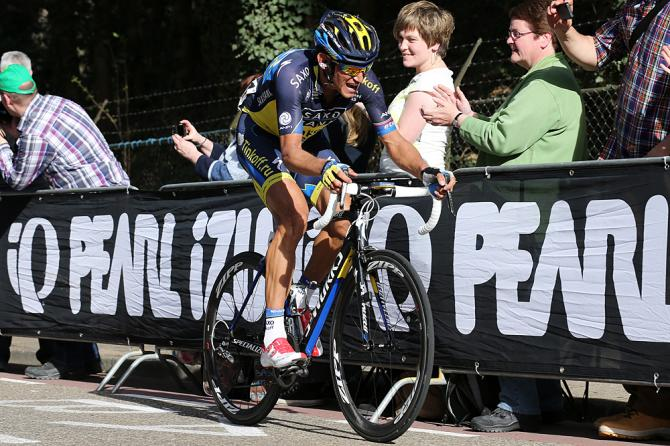
Roman Kreuziger on the attack at Cauberg to win the 2013 Amstel Gold Race.

== Other sports ==
Since 2011 a cyclo-cross race has been held on and around Cauberg and the 2018 UCI Cyclo-cross World Championships was held on Cauberg. Where Belgian's Wout van Aert and Sanne Cant were World Champions.

Also, in 2011 and 2012 Red Bull organized a Crashed Ice event on the slopes of Cauberg.
