= 2008 in men's road cycling =

In 2008, for the first time in ten years, two Grand Tours were won by one rider, the Spaniard Alberto Contador. Alessandro Ballan succeeded fellow Italian Paolo Bettini as World Champion, winning the road race in his home country, where Varese hosted the World Championships for the second time in history. Bettini and German sprinter Erik Zabel were among the most prominent riders to quit after this season, while Mario Cipollini made a brief comeback in the early months of the year.

Despite even tighter controls and warnings concerning doping, and the introduction of the blood passport by the UCI, several major races, including the Giro and Tour were faced with positive tests. In addition, the ongoing feud between the UCI and the race organizations almost came to a definite break in March, when the UCI threatened to suspend riders participating in ASO's Paris–Nice. The cycling federation's ProTour seemed bankrupt halfway through the year when all remaining licensed teams announced their withdrawal. However, at the start of 2009, 16 teams saw their ProTour license renewed and two new teams joined the elite division of cycling. Crédit Agricole and Gerolsteiner stopped sponsorship of a team, and were not succeeded by new sponsors. Other than Gerolsteiner, many German companies who participated in cycling sponsorship in recent years withdrew their financial backing after this year's latest of doping cases related to German cycling. As a result, fewer professional teams and races, among them the Deutschland Tour, will be part of the 2009 season.

Amongst professional riders, Mark Cavendish was the most successful with 17 victories, including 4 in the Tour de France and two in the Giro d'Italia. His team, Team High Road (which got a new sponsor midway through the season, ever since going by the name Team Columbia), was by far the most successful with 77 victories. Alejandro Valverde was the most successful allround rider of the year based on the CQ ranking.

After the end of the season, seven-time Tour de France winner Lance Armstrong announced his comeback to competitive road cycling for 2009, with the Astana Team.

== Grand Tours ==
Race	Date	Winner	Second	Third
Tour de France	Jul 5 – Jul 27	(Spain) Carlos Sastre	(Australia) Cadel Evans	(Austria) Bernhard Kohl
(Italy) Giro d'Italia	May 10 – Jun 1	(Spain) Alberto Contador	(Italy) Riccardo Riccò	(Italy) Marzio Bruseghin
(Spain) Vuelta a España	Aug 30 – Sep 21	(Spain) Alberto Contador	(United States) Levi Leipheimer	(Spain) Carlos Sastre

== World Championships Varese (Italy) ==
Race	Date	Winner	Second	Third
World Championship Road Race	Sep 28	(Italy) Alessandro Ballan	(Italy) Damiano Cunego	(Denmark) Matti Breschel
World Championship Time Trial	Sep 25	(Germany) Bert Grabsch	(Canada) Svein Tuft	(United States) David Zabriskie

== Olympic Games Beijing (China) ==
Race	Date	Winner	Second	Third
Olympic Road Race	Aug 9	(Spain) Samuel Sánchez	(Italy) Davide Rebellin	(Switzerland) Fabian Cancellara
Olympic Time Trial	Aug 13	(Switzerland) Fabian Cancellara	(Sweden) Gustav Larsson	(United States) Levi Leipheimer

== Monument Classics ==
Race	Date	Winner	Second	Third
(Italy) Milan–San Remo	Mar 22	(Switzerland) Fabian Cancellara	(Italy) Filippo Pozzato	(Belgium) Philippe Gilbert
(Belgium) Tour of Flanders	Apr 6	(Belgium) Stijn Devolder	(Belgium) Nick Nuyens	(Spain) Juan Antonio Flecha
(France) Paris–Roubaix	Apr 13	(Belgium) Tom Boonen	(Switzerland) Fabian Cancellara	(Italy) Alessandro Ballan
(Belgium) Liège–Bastogne–Liège	Apr 27	(Spain) Alejandro Valverde	(Italy) Davide Rebellin	(Luxembourg) Fränk Schleck
(Italy) Giro di Lombardia	Oct 18	(Italy) Damiano Cunego	(Slovenia) Janez Brajkovič	(Colombia) Rigoberto Urán

== UCI ProTour ==
Race	Date	Winner	Second	Third
(Australia) Tour Down Under	Jan 22–27	(Germany) André Greipel	(Australia) Allan Davis	(Spain) José Joaquín Rojas
(Spain) Vuelta al País Vasco	Apr 7–12	(Spain) Alberto Contador	(Australia) Cadel Evans	(Netherlands) Thomas Dekker
(Belgium) Gent–Wevelgem	Apr 9	(Spain) Óscar Freire	(Switzerland) Aurélien Clerc	(Belgium) Wouter Weylandt
(Netherlands) Amstel Gold Race	Apr 27	(Italy) Damiano Cunego	(Luxembourg) Fränk Schleck	(Spain) Alejandro Valverde
(Switzerland) Tour de Romandie	Apr 29 – May 4	(Germany) Andreas Klöden	(Czech Republic) Roman Kreuziger	(Italy) Marco Pinotti
(Spain) Volta a Catalunya	May 19–25	(Spain) Gustavo César	(Colombia) Rigoberto Urán	(France) Rémi Pauriol
(France) Critérium du Dauphiné Libéré	Jun 8–15	(Spain) Alejandro Valverde	(Australia) Cadel Evans	(United States) Levi Leipheimer
(Switzerland) Tour de Suisse	Jun 14–22	(Czech Republic) Roman Kreuziger	(Germany) Andreas Klöden	(Spain) Igor Antón
(Spain) Clásica de San Sebastián	Aug 2	(Spain) Alejandro Valverde	(Russia) Alexandr Kolobnev	(Italy) Davide Rebellin
(Belgium) (Netherlands) (Luxembourg) Tour of Benelux	Aug 20–27	(Spain) Iván Gutiérrez	(Belgium) Sébastien Rosseler	(Australia) Michael Rogers
GP Ouest-France	Aug 25	(France) Pierrick Fédrigo	(Italy) Alessandro Ballan	(Spain) David López
(Germany) Deutschland Tour	Aug 29 – Sep 6	(Germany) Linus Gerdemann	(Sweden) Thomas Lövkvist	(Slovenia) Janez Brajkovič
(Germany) Vattenfall Cyclassics	Sep 7	(Australia) Robbie McEwen	(Australia) Mark Renshaw	(Australia) Allan Davis
(Poland) Tour de Pologne	Sep 14–20	(Germany) Jens Voigt	(Denmark) Lars Bak	(Italy) Franco Pellizotti

== 2.HC Category races ==
Race	Date	Winner	Second	Third
(Malaysia) Tour de Langkawi	Feb 9–17	(Moldova) Ruslan Ivanov	(France) Matthieu Sprick	(Spain) Gustavo César
(United States) Tour of California	Feb 17–24	(United States) Levi Leipheimer	(United Kingdom) David Millar	(United States) Christian Vande Velde
(France) Paris–Nice	Mar 9–16	(Italy) Davide Rebellin	(Italy) Rinaldo Nocentini	(Ukraine) Yaroslav Popovych
(Italy) Tirreno–Adriatico	Mar 12–18	(Switzerland) Fabian Cancellara	(Italy) Enrico Gasparotto	(Sweden) Thomas Lövkvist
(France) Critérium International	Mar 29–30	(Germany) Jens Voigt	(Sweden) Gustav Larsson	(Spain) Luis León Sánchez
(Belgium) Three Days of De Panne	Apr 1–3	(Netherlands) Joost Posthuma	(Italy) Manuel Quinziato	(Italy) Enrico Gasparotto
(United States) Tour de Georgia	Apr 21–27	(Belarus) Kanstantsin Sivtsov	(Australia) Trent Lowe	(United States) Levi Leipheimer
(France) Four Days of Dunkirk	May 6–11	(France) Stéphane Augé	(France) Clément Lhotellerie	(France) Pierrick Fédrigo
(Germany) Bayern Rundfahrt	May 28 – Jun 1	(Germany) Christian Knees	(Switzerland) Andreas Dietziker	(Netherlands) Niki Terpstra
Tour de Luxembourg	Jun 4–8	(Netherlands) Joost Posthuma	(Switzerland) Michael Albasini	(Luxembourg) Fränk Schleck
(Spain) Euskal Bizikleta	Jun 6–8	(Italy) Eros Capecchi	(Spain) Igor Antón	(Spain) Adrián Palomares
Tour of Austria	July 6–13	(Austria) Thomas Rohregger	(Russia) Vladimir Gusev	(Ukraine) Ruslan Pidgornyy
(China) Tour of Qinghai Lake	July 11–20	(United States) Tyler Hamilton	(Poland) Marek Rutkiewicz	(Iran) Hossein Askari
(Belgium) Tour de Wallonie	July 26–30	(Russia) Sergei Ivanov	(Belgium) Greg Van Avermaet	(Italy) Paolo Bettini
(Denmark) Danmark Rundt	July 30 – Aug 3	(Denmark) Jakob Fuglsang	(United Kingdom) Steve Cummings	(Netherlands) Tom Stamsnijder
(Spain) Vuelta a Burgos	Aug 5–9	(Spain) Xabier Zandio Echaide	(Spain) Iñigo Landaluze	(Colombia) Walter Pedraza
Volta a Portugal	Aug 13–24	(Spain) David Blanco	(Spain) Héctor Guerra	(Spain) Rubén Plaza

== 1.HC Category races ==
Race	Date	Winner	Second	Third
(Belgium) Omloop Het Volk	Mar 1	(Belgium) Philippe Gilbert	(Belgium) Nick Nuyens	(Norway) Thor Hushovd
(Belgium) E3 Prijs Vlaanderen	Mar 29	(Norway) Kurt Asle Arvesen	(Germany) David Kopp	(Belgium) Greg Van Avermaet
(Spain) GP Miguel Induráin	Apr 5	(Germany) Fabian Wegmann	(Switzerland) Michael Albasini	(Spain) Joaquim Rodríguez
(Belgium) Scheldeprijs	Apr 16	(United Kingdom) Mark Cavendish	(Belgium) Tom Boonen	(Australia) Robbie McEwen
(Belgium) La Flèche Wallonne	Apr 23	(Luxembourg) Kim Kirchen	(Australia) Cadel Evans	(Italy) Damiano Cunego
(Germany) Rund um den Henninger Turm	May 1	(Netherlands) Karsten Kroon	(Italy) Davide Rebellin	(Colombia) Mauricio Alberto Ardila Cano
(United States) Commerce Bank International Championship	Jun 8	(Denmark) Matti Breschel	(United States) Kirk O'Bee	(United States) Fred Rodriguez
(Switzerland) GP du Canton d'Argovie	Jun 8	(France) Lloyd Mondory	(Switzerland) Manuel Quinziato	(Sweden) Enrico Gasparotto
(Netherlands) Dutch Food Valley Classic	Jun 11	(Germany) Robert Förster	(Germany) Sven Krauss	(Belgium) Niko Eeckhout
(Italy) Tre Valli Varesine	Aug 19	(Italy) Francesco Ginanni	(Italy) Leonardo Bertagnolli	(Italy) Damiano Cunego
(Italy) Giro del Veneto	Aug 31	(Italy) Francesco Ginanni	(Ukraine) Serhiy Honchar	(Italy) Andrea Masciarelli
(Italy) Coppa Placci	Sep 6	(Italy) Luca Paolini	(Italy) Enrico Gasparotto	(Italy) Mauro Finetto
(France) (Belgium) Paris–Brussels	Sep 13	(Australia) Robbie McEwen	(Belgium) Gert Steegmans	(Italy) Luca Paolini
(France) GP de Fourmies	Sep 14	(Italy) Giovanni Visconti	(France) Stéphane Goubert	(Italy) Fabio Sacchi
(Italy) Giro del Lazio	Oct 5	(Italy) Francesco Masciarelli	(Italy) Filippo Pozzato	(Italy) Danilo Di Luca
(Italy) Giro dell'Emilia	Oct 11	(Italy) Danilo Di Luca	(Italy) Davide Rebellin	(Russia) Alexandr Kolobnev
(France) Paris–Tours	Oct 12	(Belgium) Philippe Gilbert	(Belgium) Jan Kuyckx	(France) Sébastien Turgot
(Italy) Giro del Piemonte	Oct 16	(Italy) Daniele Bennati	(Italy) Luca Paolini	(Belarus) Alexandre Usov
Japan Cup	Oct 26	(Italy) Damiano Cunego	(Italy) Giovanni Visconti	(Italy) Ivan Basso

== National Road Race Championships ==
Race	Date	Winner	Second	Third
Australia	Jan 13	(Australia) Matthew Lloyd	(Australia) Adam Hansen	(Australia) Rory Sutherland
Austria	Jun 29	(Austria) Christian Pfannberger	(Austria) Hans Peter Obwaller	(Austria) Stefan Rucker
Belgium	Jun 29	(Belgium) Jürgen Roelandts	(Belgium) Sven Vanthourenhout	(Belgium) Niko Eeckhout
Canada	Jul 6	(Canada) Christian Meier	(Canada) Bruno Langlois	(Canada) Jacob Erker
Czech Republic & Slovakia	Jun 29	(Slovakia) Matej Jurčo	(Slovakia) Roman Broniš	(Czech Republic) Petr Benčík
Denmark	Jun 29	(Denmark) Nicki Sørensen	(Denmark) Matti Breschel	(Denmark) Jens-Erik Madsen
France	Jun 29	(France) Nicolas Vogondy	(France) Arnaud Coyot	(France) Julien Loubet
Germany	Jun 29	(Germany) Fabian Wegmann	(Germany) Erik Zabel	(Germany) Gerald Ciolek
Great Britain	Jun 29	(United Kingdom) Robert Hayles	(United Kingdom) Peter Kennaugh	(United Kingdom) Dean Downing
Ireland	Jun 29	(Republic of Ireland) Dan Martin	(Republic of Ireland) Paídi O'Brien	(Republic of Ireland) Brian Kenneally
Italy	Jun 29	(Italy) Filippo Simeoni	(Italy) Giovanni Visconti	(Italy) Filippo Pozzato
Luxembourg	Jun 27	(Luxembourg) Fränk Schleck	(Luxembourg) Benoît Joachim	(Luxembourg) Christian Poos
Netherlands	Jun 29	(Netherlands) Lars Boom	(Netherlands) Koos Moerenhout	(Netherlands) Steven de Jongh
New Zealand	Jan 13	(New Zealand) Julian Dean	(New Zealand) Heath Blackgrove	(New Zealand) Scott Lyttle
Norway	Jun 29	(Norway) Kurt Asle Arvesen	(Norway) Stian Remme	(Norway) Lars Petter Nordhaug
Portugal	Jun 29	(Portugal) João Cabreira	(Portugal) Tiago Machado	(Portugal) Cândido Barbosa
Russia	Jun 29	(Russia) Sergey Ivanov	(Russia) Aleksandr Bazhenov	(Russia) Roman Klimov
Spain	Jun 29	(Spain) Alejandro Valverde	(Spain) Óscar Sevilla	(Spain) Óscar Pereiro
Sweden	Jun 29	(Sweden) Jonas Ljungblad	(Sweden) Nicklas Axelsson	(Sweden) Thomas Lövkvist
Switzerland	Jun 29	(Switzerland) Markus Zberg	(Switzerland) Martin Elmiger	(Switzerland) Mathias Frank
Ukraine	Jun 28	(Ukraine) Ruslan Pidgornyy	(Ukraine) Denis Kostiuk	(Ukraine) Volodymyr Zagorodniy
USA	Aug 31	(United States) Tyler Hamilton	(United States) Blake Caldwell	(United States) Danny Pate

== National Time Trial Championships ==
Race	Date	Winner	Second	Third
Australia	Jan 10	(Australia) Adam Hansen	(Australia) Rory Sutherland	(Australia) Ben Day
Austria	Jun 28	(Austria) Stefan Denifl	(Austria) Josef Benetseder	(Austria) Matthias Brändle
Belgium	Aug 15	(Belgium) Stijn Devolder	(Belgium) Leif Hoste	(Belgium) Dominique Cornu
Canada	Jul 4	(Canada) Svein Tuft	(Canada) Ryan Roth	(Canada) Zach Bell
Czech Republic & Slovakia	Jun 27	(Czech Republic) František Raboň	(Czech Republic) Jan Hruška	(Slovakia) Matej Jurčo
Denmark	Jun 26	(Denmark) Lars Bak	(Denmark) Frank Høj	(Denmark) Michael Blaudzun
France	Jun 26	(France) Sylvain Chavanel	(France) Christophe Kern	(France) Noan Lelarge
Germany	Jun 27	(Germany) Bert Grabsch	(Germany) Stefan Schumacher	(Germany) Tony Martin
Great Britain	Jun 27	(United Kingdom) Michael Hutchinson	(United Kingdom) Wouter Syybrandy	(United Kingdom) Matthew Brottrill
Ireland	Jun 27	(Republic of Ireland) Paul Healion	(Republic of Ireland) Neil Delahaye	(Republic of Ireland) John Heverin
Italy	Jun 22	(Italy) Marco Pinotti	(Italy) Luca Celli	(Italy) Maurizio Biondo
Luxembourg	Jun 26	(Luxembourg) Kim Kirchen	(Luxembourg) Christian Poos	(Luxembourg) Benoît Joachim
Netherlands	Aug 31	(Netherlands) Lars Boom	(Netherlands) Joost Posthuma	(Netherlands) Koen de Kort
New Zealand	Jan 11	(New Zealand) Logan Hutchings	(New Zealand) Paul Odlin	(New Zealand) Gordon McCauley
Norway	Jun 27	(Norway) Edvald Boasson Hagen	(Norway) Geir Lien	(Norway) Knut Anders Fostervold
Portugal	Jun 28	(Portugal) Sérgio Paulinho	(Portugal) Tiago Machado	(Portugal) Hélder Oliveira
Russia	Jun 27	(Russia) Vladimir Gusev	(Russia) Timofey Kritskiy	(Russia) Vladimir Karpets
Spain	Jun 28	(Spain) Luis León Sánchez	(Spain) Rubén Plaza	(Spain) Iván Gutiérrez
Sweden	Jun 25	(Sweden) Fredrik Ericsson	(Sweden) Gustav Larsson	(Sweden) Thomas Lövkvist
Switzerland	Jun 29	(Switzerland) Fabian Cancellara	(Switzerland) Rubens Bertogliati	(Switzerland) Andreas Dietziker
Ukraine	Jun 26	(Ukraine) Andrey Grivko	(Ukraine) Sergey Matveev	(Ukraine) Denis Kostiuk
USA	Sep 1	(United States) David Zabriskie	(United States) Tom Zirbel	(United States) Christian Vande Velde

== See also ==
- 2008 in women's road cycling
- 2008 in track cycling
