= 2006 Tour de Pologne =

Cycling race

The 2006 Tour de Pologne road cycling race took place from September 4 until September 10. German Stefan Schumacher won the last the two last stages on his way to capturing his second consecutive stage race; previously winning the Eneco Tour of Benelux.

== Stages ==
=== Stage 1: 04-09-2006: Pułtusk-Olsztyn, 214 km ===
Stage 1 result

	Cyclist	Country	Team	Time
1	Max van Heeswijk	Netherlands	Discovery Channel	5h 55' 34"
2	Fabrizio Guidi	Italy	Phonak	s.t.
3	Wouter Weylandt	Belgium	Quick-Step–Innergetic	s.t.

General Classification after Stage 1

	Cyclist	Country	Team	Time
1	Max van Heeswijk	Netherlands	Discovery Channel	5h 55' 34"
2	Fabrizio Guidi	Italy	Phonak	s.t.
3	Wouter Weylandt	Belgium	Quick-Step–Innergetic	s.t.

=== Stage 2: 05-09-2006: Ostróda-Elbląg, 119.6 km ===
Stage 2 result

	Cyclist	Country	Team	Time
1	Daniele Bennati	Italy	Lampre–Fondital	2h 54' 49"
2	Wouter Weylandt	Belgium	Quick-Step–Innergetic	s.t.
3	Jose Rojas Gil	Spain	Astana	s.t.

General Classification after Stage 2

	Cyclist	Country	Team	Time
1	Wouter Weylandt	Belgium	Quick-Step–Innergetic	8h 50' 13"
2	Max van Heeswijk	Netherlands	Discovery Channel	s.t.
3	Daniele Bennati	Italy	Lampre–Fondital	s.t.

=== Stage 3: 06-09-2006: Gdańsk-Toruń, 225.5 km ===
Stage 1 result

	Cyclist	Country	Team	Time
1	Fabrizio Guidi	Italy	Phonak	5h 28' 37"
2	Daniele Bennati	Italy	Lampre–Fondital	s.t.
3	Koldo Fernández	Spain	Euskaltel–Euskadi	s.t.

General Classification after Stage 3

	Cyclist	Country	Team	Time
1	Fabrizio Guidi	Italy	Phonak	14h 18' 43"
2	Daniele Bennati	Italy	Lampre–Fondital	+ 1"
3	Wouter Weylandt	Belgium	Quick-Step–Innergetic	+ 5"

=== Stage 4: 07-09-2006: Bydgoszcz-Poznań, 182 km ===
Stage 4 result

	Cyclist	Country	Team	Time
1	Daniele Bennati	Italy	Lampre–Fondital	4h 15' 43"
2	Fabrizio Guidi	Italy	Phonak	s.t.
3	Sébastien Chavanel	France	Bouygues Télécom	s.t.

General Classification after Stage 4

	Cyclist	Country	Team	Time
1	Daniele Bennati	Italy	Lampre–Fondital	18h 34' 17"
2	Fabrizio Guidi	Italy	Phonak	+ 3"
3	Wouter Weylandt	Belgium	Quick-Step–Innergetic	+ 14"

=== Stage 5: 08-09-2006: Legnica-Jelenia Góra, 192 km ===
Stage 5 result

	Cyclist	Country	Team	Time
1	Stéphane Augé	France	Cofidis	4h 58' 10"
2	Aaron Olson	United States	Saunier Duval–Prodir	s.t.
3	Max van Heeswijk	Netherlands	Discovery Channel	+ 21"

General Classification after Stage 5

	Cyclist	Country	Team	Time
1	Daniele Bennati	Italy	LAM	23h 32'48"
2	Fabrizio Guidi	Italy	Phonak	+ 3"
3	Wouter Weylandt	Belgium	Quick-Step–Innergetic	+ 14"

=== Stage 6: 09-09-2006: Szczawno Zdrój-Karpacz, 162.4 km ===
Stage 6 result

	Cyclist	Country	Team	Time
1	Stefan Schumacher	Germany	Gerolsteiner	4h 19'39"
2	Fabian Wegmann	Germany	Gerolsteiner	+ 2"
3	Cadel Evans	Australia	Davitamon–Lotto	+ 4"

General Classification after Stage 6

	Cyclist	Country	Team	Time
1	Stefan Schumacher	Germany	Gerolsteiner	27h 52'43"
2	Cadel Evans	Australia	Davitamon–Lotto	+ 10"
3	Alessandro Ballan	Italy	Lampre–Fondital	+ 16"

=== Stage 7: 10-09-2006: Jelenia Góra-Karpacz, 126 km ===
Stage 7 result

	Cyclist	Country	Team	Time
1	Stefan Schumacher	Germany	Gerolsteiner	3h 17'08"
2	Vincenzo Nibali	Italy	Liquigas	+ 2"
3	Cadel Evans	Australia	Davitamon–Lotto	+ 2"

General Classification after Stage 7

	Cyclist	Country	Team	Time
1	Stefan Schumacher	Germany	Gerolsteiner	31h 09'41"
2	Cadel Evans	Australia	Davitamon–Lotto	+ 18"
3	Alessandro Ballan	Italy	Lampre–Fondital	+ 31"

== General Standings ==
Final (After Stage 7)

	Cyclist	Country	Team	Time
1	Stefan Schumacher	Germany	Gerolsteiner	31h 09'41"
2	Cadel Evans	Australia	Davitamon–Lotto	+ 18"
3	Alessandro Ballan	Italy	Lampre–Fondital	+ 31"
4	Marek Rutkiewicz	Poland	Intel–Action	+ 31"
5	Alexandr Kolobnev	Russia	Rabobank	+ 39"
6	Alexander Bocharov	Russia	Crédit Agricole	+ 40"
7	Cristian Moreni	Italy	Cofidis	+ 45"
8	Vincenzo Nibali	Italy	Liquigas	+ 52"
9	Marzio Bruseghin	Italy	Lampre–Fondital	+ 56"
10	Leonardo Bertagnolli	Italy	Cofidis	+ 1' 01"

== KOM Classification ==
The leader of the climbers classification (or King of the Mountains) is determined by obtaining points for reaching 19 mountain primes ahead of the competition. The classification leader will wear green jersey. Order of riders will be decided by the total number of points scored during the mountain primes.

	Cyclist	Country	Team	Points
1	Bartosz Huzarski	Poland	Intel–Action	50 points
2	Joost Posthuma	Netherlands	Rabobank	37 points
3	Marzio Bruseghin	Italy	Lampre–Fondital	31 points

== Points Classification ==
	Cyclist	Country	Team	Points
1	Wouter Weylandt	Belgium	Quick-Step–Innergetic	81 points
2	Daniele Bennati	Italy	Lampre–Fondital	74 points
3	Fabrizio Guidi	Italy	Phonak	71 points

== Best Team ==
	Team	Country	Time
1	Crédit Agricole	France	93h 31' 22"
2	Cofidis	France	+ 1' 56"
3	Caisse d'Epargne–Illes Balears	Spain	+ 4' 12"

== Jersey progress chart ==
Stage (Winner)	General Classification Yellow Jersey	Mountains Classification Green Jersey	Points Classification Navy Blue Jersey	Team Classification
Stage 1 (Max van Heeswijk)	Max van Heeswijk	no award	Max van Heeswijk	Discovery Channel
Stage 2 (Daniele Bennati)	Wouter Weylandt	Sven Krauss	Wouter Weylandt	Discovery Channel
Stage 3 (Fabrizio Guidi)	Fabrizio Guidi	Sven Krauss	Wouter Weylandt	Discovery Channel
Stage 4 (Daniele Bennati)	Daniele Bennati	Sven Krauss	Wouter Weylandt	Discovery Channel
Stage 5 (Stéphane Augé)	Daniele Bennati	Aaron Olson	Wouter Weylandt	Cofidis
Stage 6 (Stefan Schumacher)	Stefan Schumacher	Joost Posthuma	Wouter Weylandt	Crédit Agricole
Stage 7 (Stefan Schumacher)	Stefan Schumacher	Bartosz Huzarski	Wouter Weylandt	Crédit Agricole
FINAL STANDINGS	Stefan Schumacher	Bartosz Huzarski	Wouter Weylandt	Crédit Agricole
