= 2008 Three Days of De Panne =

Race details
- Dates: 1 April–3 April 2008
- Stages: 3
- Distance: 552.7 km (343.4 mi)
- Winning time: 14h 15' 05"

Results
| | Winner | Joost Posthuma (NED) |
| | Second | Manuel Quinziato (ITA) |
| | Third | Enrico Gasparotto (ITA) |

The 2008 Three Days of De Panne was the 32nd edition of the Three Days of De Panne cycle race, held from 1–3 April 2008. It started in Middelkerke and finished in De Panne, and was won by Joost Posthuma.

== General classification ==
Final general classification

| Rank | Rider | Time |
|---|---|---|
| 1 | Joost Posthuma (NED) | 14h 15' 05" |
| 2 | Manuel Quinziato (ITA) | + 2" |
| 3 | Enrico Gasparotto (ITA) | + 8" |
| 4 | Niki Terpstra (NED) | + 10" |
| 5 | Simon Špilak (SLO) | + 40" |
| 6 | Rick Flens (NED) | + 46" |
| 7 | Alessandro Ballan (ITA) | + 53" |
| 8 | Magnus Bäckstedt (SWE) | + 58" |
| 9 | George Hincapie (USA) | + 59" |
| 10 | Luca Paolini (ITA) | + 1' 04" |
