= Cadamuro =

Cadamuro is an Italian surname. Notable people with the surname include:

- Liassine Cadamuro (born 1988), French footballer
- Louisa Cadamuro (born 1987), French footballer, wife of Liassine
- Simone Cadamuro (born 1976), Italian road racing cyclist
