= 2005 in men's road cycling =

The 2005 season will be best remembered for Lance Armstrong's unparalleled seventh successive victory in the Tour de France, however it was also notable for other reasons. After months of wrangling between the UCI, teams, and organizers of the major tours, the ProTour finally became a reality.

== Elite Men ==
=== January ===
Date	Race	Location	Notes	Winner	Nationality
01/18 – 01/23	Tour Down Under	Australia	Hors Catégorie	Luis León Sánchez	ESP
01/28 – 02/06	Tour de Langkawi	Malaysia	Hors Catégorie	Ryan Cox	RSA
01/29	Doha International GP	Qatar		Robert Hunter	RSA
01/31 – 02/04	Tour of Qatar	Qatar		Lars Michaelsen	DEN

=== February ===
Date	Race	Location	Notes	Winner	Nationality
02/01	GP d'Ouverture La Marseillaise	France		Nicki Sørensen	DEN
02/02	Étoile de Bessèges	France		Freddy Bichot	FRA
02/06	GP Costa degli Etruschi	Italy		Alessandro Petacchi	ITA
02/06	Trofeo Mallorca	Spain		Óscar Freire	ESP
02/07	Trofeo Alcudia	Spain		Óscar Freire	ESP
02/08	Trofeo Soller	Spain		Alejandro Valverde	ESP
02/09	Trofeo Manacor	Spain		Alejandro Valverde	ESP
02/09 – 02/13	Tour Méditerranéen	France		Jens Voigt	GER
02/10	Trofeo Calvià	Spain		Toni Colom	ESP
02/10 – 02/13	GP Internacional Costa Azul	Portugal		Rubén Plaza	ESP
02/13 – 02/17	Vuelta a Andalucía	Spain		Francisco Cabello Luque	ESP
02/15	Trofeo Laigueglia	Italy		Kim Kirchen	LUX
02/16 – 02/20	Volta ao Algarve	Portugal		Hugo Sabido	POR
02/19	Tour du Haut Var	France		Philippe Gilbert	BEL
02/19	Trofeo Luis Puig	Spain		Alessandro Petacchi	ITA
02/20	Classic Haribo	France		Gorik Gardeyn	BEL
02/22 – 02/26	Volta a la Comunitat Valenciana	Spain		Alessandro Petacchi	ITA
02/26	Gran Premio di Chiasso	Switzerland		Kim Kirchen	LUX
02/26	Omloop "Het Volk"	Belgium	Hors Catégorie	Nick Nuyens	BEL
02/27	Clásica de Almería	Spain		Ivan Gutierrez	ESP
02/27	Gran Premio di Lugano	Switzerland		Rik Verbrugghe	BEL
02/27	Kuurne–Brussels–Kuurne	Belgium		George Hincapie	United States

=== March ===
Date	Race	Location	Notes	Winner	Nationality
03/02 – 03/06	Vuelta a Murcia	Spain		Koldo Gil	ESP
03/05	Milano–Torino	Italy	Hors Catégorie	Fabio Sacchi	ITA
03/06 – 03/13	Paris–Nice	France	ProTour	Bobby Julich	United States
03/07	Giro della Provincia di Lucca	Italy		Mario Cipollini	ITA
03/09 – 03/15	Tirreno–Adriatico	Italy	ProTour	Óscar Freire	ESP
03/16	Nokere-Koerse	Belgium		Steven de Jongh	NED
03/19	Milan–San Remo	Italy	ProTour	Alessandro Petacchi	ITA
03/20	Cholet-Pays De Loire	France		Pierrick Fédrigo	FRA
03/20	GP Rudy Dhaenens	Belgium		Koen Barbé	BEL
03/20	Stausee-Rundfahrt Klingnau	Switzerland		Danilo Napolitano	ITA
03/21 – 03/25	Setmana Catalana de Ciclisme	Spain	Hors Catégorie	Alberto Contador Velasco	ESP
03/22 – 03/26	Settimana Ciclistica Internazionale	Italy		Franco Pellizotti	ITA
03/23	Dwars door Vlaanderen	Belgium		Niko Eeckhout	BEL
03/26	E3 Prijs Vlaanderen	Belgium	Hors Catégorie	Tom Boonen	BEL
03/26 – 03/27	Critérium International	France	Hors Catégorie	Bobby Julich	United States
03/27	Brabantse Pijl	Belgium		Óscar Freire	ESP
03/28	Giro della Provincia Reggio-Calabria	Italy		Guillermo Ruben Bongiorno	ARG
03/28	Rund um Köln	Germany		David Kopp	GER
03/29	Paris–Camembert	France		Laurent Brochard	FRA
03/29 – 03/31	Three Days of De Panne	Belgium	Hors Catégorie	Stijn Devolder	BEL

=== April ===
Date	Race	Location	Notes	Winner	Nationality
04/01	Route Adélie de Vitré	France		Daniele Contrini	ITA
04/02	GP Miguel Indurain	Spain		Javier Pascual-Rodriguez	ESP
04/02	Hel van het Mergelland	The Netherlands		Nico Sijmens	BEL
04/03	Tour of Flanders	Belgium	ProTour	Tom Boonen	BEL
04/03	GP de la Ville de Rennes	France		Ludovic Turpin	FRA
04/04	Tour of the Basque Country	Spain	ProTour	Danilo Di Luca	ITA
04/05 – 04/08	Circuit Cycliste Sarthe – Pays de la Loire	France		Sylvain Chavanel	FRA
04/06	Gent–Wevelgem	Belgium	ProTour	Nico Mattan	BEL
04/07	GP Cerami	Belgium		Kai Reus	NED
04/09	Albert Achterhes Profronde van Drenthe	The Netherlands		Marcel Sieberg	GER
04/10	Paris–Roubaix	France	ProTour	Tom Boonen	BEL
04/10	Klasika Primavera	Spain		David Etxebarria Alkorta	ESP
04/13	Scheldeprijs Vlaanderen	Belgium	Hors Catégorie	Thorwald Veneberg	NED
04/13 – 04/17	Vuelta a Aragón	Spain		Rubén Plaza	ESP
04/14	GP de Denain Porte du Hainaut	France		Jimmy Casper	FRA
04/15	Veenendaal–Veenendaal	The Netherlands	Hors Catégorie	Paul Van Schalen	NED
04/16	Tour du Finistère	France		Simon Gerrans	AUS
04/17	Amstel Gold Race	The Netherlands	ProTour	Danilo Di Luca	ITA
04/17	Giro d'Oro	Italy		Luca Mazzanti	ITA
04/17	Tro-Bro Léon	France		Tristan Valentin	FRA
04/19 – 04/22	Giro del Trentino	Italy		Julio Alberto Perez Cuapio	MEX
04/19 – 04/24	Tour de Georgia	United States		Tom Danielson	United States
04/20	La Flèche Wallonne	Belgium	ProTour	Danilo Di Luca	ITA
04/20 – 04/24	Internationale Niedersachsen-Rundfahrt	Germany		Stefan Schumacher	GER
04/21 – 04/24	Vuelta Ciclista a la Rioja	Spain		Javier Pascual Rodriguez	ESP
04/24	Liège–Bastogne–Liège	Belgium	ProTour	Alexander Vinokourov	KAZ
04/24	Berner-Rundfahrt – Tour de Berne	Switzerland		René Weissinger	GER
04/24	Giro dell'Appennino	Italy		Gilberto Simoni	ITA
04/24	Ronde van Noord-Holland	The Netherlands		Paul van Schalen	NED
04/26 – 05/01	Tour de Romandie	Switzerland	ProTour	Santiago Botero	COL
04/27 – 04/30	Circuit de Lorraine Professionnels	France		Andris Naudužs	LAT
04/27 – 05/01	Vuelta a Castilla y León	Spain		Carlos García Quesada	ESP
04/30	GP Herning	Denmark		Michael Blaudzun	DEN
04/30	GP Industria & Artigianato – Larciano	Italy		Luca Mazzanti	ITA

=== May ===
Date	Race	Location	Notes	Winner	Nationality
05/01	CSC Classic	Denmark		Jacob Moe Rasmussen	DEN
05/01	Giro di Toscana	Italy		Daniele Bennati	ITA
05/01	Rund um den Henninger Turm	Germany	Hors Catégorie	Erik Zabel	GER
05/01	Trophée des Grimpeurs – Polymultipliée	France		Philippe Gilbert	BEL
05/02 – 05/05	Internationale UNIQA Classic	Austria		Bram de Groot	NED
05/04 – 05/08	4 Jours de Dunkerque	France	Hors Catégorie	Pierrick Fedrigo	FRA
05/07 – 05/29	Giro d'Italia	Italy	ProTour	Paolo Savoldelli	ITA
05/07 – 05/08	Clasica Internacional a Alcobendas	Spain		Pavel Tonkov	RUS
05/11 – 05/15	Internationale Rheinland-Pfalz Rundfahrt	Germany		Stefan Schumacher	GER
05/13 – 05/15	Tour de Picardie	France		Janek Tombak	EST
05/16 – 05/22	Volta a Catalunya	Spain	ProTour	Yaroslav Popovych	UKR
05/16	Grand Prix de Villers-Cotterêts – Trophée Skoda Automobiles	France		Bradley McGee	AUS
05/22	Tour de Vendée	France		Jonas Ljungblad	SWE
05/25 – 05/29	Bayern-Rundfahrt	Germany	Hors Catégorie	Michael Rich	GER
05/25 – 05/29	Tour de Belgique	Belgium		Tom Boonen	BEL
05/25 – 05/29	Volta ao Alentejo	Portugal		Xabier Tondo	ESP
05/27	Ühispanga Tartu GP	Estonia		Tomas Vaitkus	LTU
05/28	EOS Tallinn GP	Estonia		Janek Tombak	EST
05/29	GP Llodio	Spain		David Herrero	ESP
05/31	Wachovia Invitational – Lancaster	United States		Greg Henderson	NZL

=== June ===
Date	Race	Location	Notes	Winner	Nationality
06/01 – 06/05	Euskal Bizikleta	Spain	Hors Catégorie	Eladio Jiménez	ESP
06/02	Wachovia Classic – Trenton	United States		Gordon Fraser	Canada
06/02 – 06/05	Tour de Luxembourg	Luxembourg	Hors Catégorie	László Bodrogi	HUN
06/04	GP Schwarzwald	Germany		Fabian Wegmann	GER
06/05 – 06/12	Critérium du Dauphiné Libéré	France	ProTour	Inigo Landaluze Intxaurraga	ESP
06/05	GP Kanton Aargau	Switzerland	Hors Catégorie	Alexandre Moos	SWI
06/05	Wachovia USPRO Championship	United States	Hors Catégorie	Chris Wherry	United States
06/09 – 06/12	Tour de Slovénie	Slovenia		Przemyslaw Niemiec	POL
06/10 – 06/12	GP CTT Correios de Portugal	Portugal		Alexei Markov	RUS
06/19	UCI ProTour Eindhoven Team Time Trial	The Netherlands	ProTour	Gerolsteiner	
06/15	Subida al Naranco	Spain		Rinaldo Nocentini	ITA
06/15 – 06/18	Ster Elektrotoer	The Netherlands		Stefan Schumacher	GER
06/16 – 06/19	Route du Sud	France		Sandy Casar	FRA
06/17 – 06/21	Vuelta Ciclista Asturias	Spain		Adolfo García Quesada	ESP
06/11 – 06/19	Tour de Suisse	Switzerland	ProTour	Aitor González Jimenez	ESP
06/22	Brussel – Ingooigem – Omloop van de Vlaamse Gemeenschap	Belgium		Bert Roesems	BEL
06/22	Noord Nederland Tour	The Netherlands		Stefan Van Dijk	NED
06/29 – 07/03	Course de la Solidarité Olympique	Poland		Piotr Wadecki	POL

=== July ===
Date	Race	Location	Notes	Winner	Nationality
07/02 – 07/24	Tour de France	France	ProTour	Lance Armstrong	United States
07/03	Tour du Doubs	France		Philip Deignan	IRL
07/03	Trofeo Matteotti	Italy		Ruggero Marzoli	ITA
07/04 – 07/10	Wiesbauer Tour – Internationale Österreich-Rundfahrt	Austria		Juan Miguel Mercado	ESP
07/06 – 07/10	Troféu Joaquim Agostinho GP Int de Ciclismo de Torres Vedras	Portugal		Guido Trentin	ITA
07/16 – 07/24	Tour of Qinghai Lake	China	Hors Catégorie	Martin Mares	CZE
07/20 – 07/24	Sachsen-Tour International	Germany		Mathew Hayman	AUS
07/22 – 07/24	Brixia Tour	Italy		Emanuele Sella	ITA
07/25	Prueba Villafranca de Ordizia – Clasica de Ordizia	Spain		Carlos García Quesada	ESP
07/25 – 07/29	Tour de la Région Wallonne	Belgium	Hors Catégorie	Luca Celli	ITA
07/26 – 07/30	Wyscig Dookola Mazowska	Poland		Piotr Zaradny	POL
07/30	LUK Challenge Chrono Bühl	Germany	Time Trial	Team CSC	DEN
07/31	HEW Cyclassics	Germany	ProTour	Filippo Pozzato	ITA
07/31	Circuito de Getxo – Memorial Ricardo Otxoa	Spain		David Fernández Domingo	ESP
07/31	Polynormande	France		Philippe Gilbert	BEL

=== August ===
Date	Race	Location	Notes	Winner	Nationality
08/02 – 08/04	Paris–Corrèze	France		Frédéric Finot	FRA
08/03 – 08/10	Eneco Tour	The Low Countries	ProTour	Bobby Julich	United States
08/03 – 08/07	Post Danmark Rundt	Denmark	Hors Catégorie	Ivan Basso	ITA
08/04	GP Città' di Camaiore	Italy		Maxim Iglinskiy	KAZ
08/05 – 08/15	Volta a Portugal	Portugal	Hors Catégorie	Vladimir Efimkin	RUS
08/06	Giro del Lazio	Italy	Hors Catégorie	Filippo Pozzato	ITA
08/07	Sparkassen Giro Bochum	Germany		Lubor Tesar	CZE
08/07 – 08/10	Tour de l'Ain	France		Carl Naibo	FRA
08/07 – 08/11	Vuelta a Burgos	Spain	Hors Catégorie	Juan Carlos Domínguez	ESP
08/09	2 Giorni Marchigiana – GP Fred Mengoni	Italy		Luca Mazzanti	ITA
08/10	2 Giorni Marchigiana – Trofeo Città' di Castelfidardo	Italy		Murilo Fischer	BRA
08/10 – 08/14	Regio-Tour	Germany		Nico Sijmens	BEL
08/13	Clásica de San Sebastián	Spain	ProTour	Constantino Zaballa Gutierrez	ESP
08/13	TEAG Hainleite	Germany		Bert Grabsch	GER
08/14	Memoriał Henryka Łasaka	Poland		Marek Maciejewski	POL
08/14	Urkiola Igoera – Subida Urkiola	Spain		Joaquín Rodríguez Oliver	ESP
08/15 – 08/23	Deutschland Tour	Germany	ProTour	Levi Leipheimer	United States
08/16	Tre Valli Varesine	Italy	Hors Catégorie	Stefano Garzelli	ITA
08/16 – 08/19	Tour du Limousin	France		Sébastien Joly	FRA
08/17	Coppa Agostoni	Italy		Paolo Valoti	ITA
08/18	Coppa Bernocchi	Italy		Danilo Napolitano	ITA
08/20	Giro del Veneto	Italy	Hors Catégorie	Eddy Mazzoleni	ITA
08/20	Tour de Rijke	The Netherlands		Stefan Van Dijk	NED
08/21	Châteauroux Classic de l'Indre Trophée Fenioux	France		Jimmy Casper	FRA
08/21	Clasica Ciclista los Puertos	Spain		Xabier Zandio	ESP
08/21	USPRO National Criterium Championships	United States		Tyler Farrar	United States
08/23	GP Stad Zottegem	Belgium		Thomas Dekker	NED
08/23 – 08/26	Tour du Poitou-Charentes	France		Sylvain Chavanel	FRA
08/24	Druivenkoers – Overijse	Belgium		Leonardo Duque	COL
08/24	GP Nobili Rubinetterie – Borgomanero	Italy		Damiano Cunego	ITA
08/25	GP Industria e Commercio Artigianato Carnaghese	Italy		Simon Gerrans	AUS
08/28	GP Ouest France – Plouay	France	ProTour	George Hincapie	United States
08/27 – 09/18	Vuelta a España	Spain	ProTour	Denis Menchov	RUS
08/30	Schaal Sels – Merksem	Belgium		Marcin Sapa	POL
08/30 – 09/04	Tour of Britain	United Kingdom		Nick Nuyens	BEL
08/31 – 09/04	Internationale Hessen-Rundfahrt	Germany		Cezary Zamana	POL

=== September ===
Date	Race	Location	Notes	Winner	Nationality
09/01	Trofeo Melinda	Italy		Damiano Cunego	ITA
09/01 – 09/10	Tour de l'Avenir	France		Lars Bak	DEN
09/03	Coppa Placci	Italy	Hors Catégorie	Paolo Valoti	ITA
09/04	Giro della Romagna	Italy		Danilo Napolitano	ITA
09/04	GP Jef Scherens Leuven	Belgium		Joost Posthuma	NED
09/04	Barclay's Global Investors Grand Prix	United States	Hors Catégorie	Fabian Wegmann	GER
09/07	Memorial Rik Van Steenbergen	Belgium		Jean-Patrick Nazon	FRA
09/10	Paris–Brussels	Belgium	Hors Catégorie	Robbie McEwen	AUS
09/11	Grand Prix de Fourmies – La Voix du Nord	France	Hors Catégorie	Robbie McEwen	AUS
09/11	Rund um die Nürnberger Altstadt	Germany		Ronny Scholz	GER
09/12 – 09/18	Tour de Pologne	Poland	ProTour	Kim Kirchen	LUX
09/14	GP de Wallonie	Belgium		Nick Nuyens	BEL
09/16	Kampioenschap van Vlaanderen	Belgium		Sergey Lagutin	UZB
09/17	Gran Premio Città di Misano – Adriatico	Italy		Guillermo Ruben Bongiorno	ARG
09/18	GP d'Isbergues	France		Niko Eeckhout	BEL
09/18	GP Industria & Commercio di Prato	Italy		Murilo Fischer	BRA
09/22	World Time Trial Championship	Spain	Time Trial	Michael Rogers	AUS
09/24	Delta Profronde	The Netherlands		Bram de Groot	NTH
09/25	World Road Race Championship	Spain	ProTour	Tom Boonen	BEL
09/27	Omloop van de Vlaamse Scheldeboorden	Belgium		Niko Eeckhout	BEL
09/29 – 10/02	Circuit Franco-Belge	Belgium		Marco Zanotti	ITA

=== October ===
Date	Race	Location	Notes	Winner	Nationality
10/01	Memorial Cimurri	Italy		Murilo Fischer	BRA
10/02	Züri-Metzgete	Switzerland	ProTour	Paolo Bettini	ITA
10/06	Coppa Sabatini	Italy		Alessandro Bertolini	ITA
10/06	Paris–Bourges	France		Lars Ytting Bak	DEN
10/08	Giro dell'Emilia	Italy	Hors Catégorie	Gilberto Simoni	ITA
10/09	Paris–Tours	France	ProTour	Erik Zabel	GER
10/09	GP Beghelli	Italy		Murilo Fischer	BRA
10/11	Nationale Sluitingprijs – Putte-Kapellen	Belgium		Gert Steegmans	BEL
10/13	Giro del Piemonte	Italy	Hors Catégorie	Murilo Fischer	BRA
10/15	Giro di Lombardia	Italy	ProTour	Paolo Bettini	ITA

=== November – December ===
No major races.

== Final rankings ==
=== ProTour ===
Rank	Rider	Nationality	Team	Nationality	Notes	Points
1	Danilo Di Luca	ITA	Liquigas-Bianchi	ITA		229
2	Tom Boonen	BEL	Quick Step	BEL		171
3	Davide Rebellin	ITA	Gerolsteiner	GER		151
4	Jan Ullrich	GER	T-Mobile	GER		140
5	Lance Armstrong	United States	Discovery Channel	United States		139

=== Continental Circuits ===
Circuit	Winner	Nationality	Team	Nationality	Notes	Points
Africa	Tiaan Kannemeyer	RSA	Team Barloworld-Valsir	GBR		163
America	Edgardo Simón	ARG	Selle Italia	COL		238
Asia	Andrey Mizurov	KAZ	Capec	KAZ		213
Europe	Murilo Fischer	BRA	Naturini-Sapore Di Mare	ITA		748
Oceania	Robert McLachlan	AUS	MG XPower	AUS		85

== See also ==
- Road bicycle racing
- UCI Continental Circuits
- UCI ProTour
- List of men's road bicycle races
