= 2006 Eneco Tour =

2006 UCI ProTour, race 20 of 27

Race details
- Dates: 16 to 23 August 2006
- Stages: 7
- Distance: 1,176.6 km (731.1 mi)
- Winning time: 27h 20' 55"

Results
	Winner	Stefan Schumacher (GER)	(Gerolsteiner)
	Second	George Hincapie (USA)	(Discovery Channel)
	Third	Vincenzo Nibali (ITA)	(Liquigas)

The 2006 Eneco Tour road cycling race took place from 16 to 23 August, two weeks later in the season than the year before. The second edition of the Eneco Tour covered parts of the Netherlands, Belgium and Germany. As in 2005, 23 teams took part in the race. Next to the 20 UCI ProTour teams, Chocolade Jacques–Topsport Vlaanderen, Skil–Shimano and Unibet.com received wild card entries.

The race itself was very close, as both the prologue (6 km) and timetrial (16 km) were quite short which led to small time differences. A dramatic conclusion on the last day rendered Stefan Schumacher the victory over George Hincapie, with just one second of advantage. Other riders who stood out during this race were the Belgians Tom Boonen and Philippe Gilbert, who both won in their home region. Other wins came from Manuel Quinziato and David Kopp.

== Schedule ==
Stage	Route	Distance	Date	Winner
P	Den Helder (Netherlands) – Den Helder (Netherlands)	6.1 km	Wednesday 16 August	Stefan Schumacher (GER)
1	Wieringerwerf (Netherlands) – Hoogeveen (Netherlands)	176.9 km	Thursday 17 August	Tom Boonen (BEL)
2	's-Hertogenbosch (Netherlands) – Sittard-Geleen (Netherlands)	194.6 km	Friday 18 August	Manuel Quinziato (ITA)
3	Beek (Netherlands) – Westmalle (Belgium)	185 km	Saturday 19 August	Tom Boonen (BEL)
4 (ITT)	Landgraaf (Netherlands) – Landgraaf (Netherlands)	16.1 km	Sunday 20 August	George Hincapie (USA)
5	Hasselt (Belgium) – Balen (Belgium)	181.7 km	Monday 21 August	Tom Boonen (BEL)
6	Bornem (Belgium) – Sint-Truiden (Belgium)	211.7 km	Tuesday 22 August	David Kopp (GER)
7	Ans (Belgium) – Ans (Belgium)	199.7 km	Wednesday 23 August	Philippe Gilbert (BEL)

== Stages ==
=== 16-08-2006: Den Helder, 6.1 km. (ITT) ===
Prologue Result

	Cyclist	Team	Time
1	Stefan Schumacher (GER)	Gerolsteiner	7' 00"
2	George Hincapie (USA)	Discovery Channel	1"
3	Joost Posthuma (NED)	Rabobank	1"

General classification after Prologue

	Cyclist	Team	Time
1	Stefan Schumacher (GER)	Gerolsteiner	7' 00"
2	George Hincapie (USA)	Discovery Channel	1"
3	Joost Posthuma (NED)	RAB	1"

=== 17-08-2006: Wieringerwerf-Hoogeveen, 176.9 km. ===
Stage 1 Result

	Cyclist	Team	Time
1	Tom Boonen (BEL)	Quick-Step–Innergetic	4h 12' 52"
2	Simone Cadamuro (ITA)	Team Milram	s.t.
3	Enrico Gasparotto (ITA)	Liquigas	s.t.

General classification after Stage 1

	Cyclist	Team	Time
1	Tom Boonen (BEL)	Quick-Step–Innergetic	4h 19' 47"
2	Stefan Schumacher (GER)	Gerolsteiner	4"
3	George Hincapie (USA)	Discovery Channel	7"

=== 18-08-2006: 's-Hertogenbosch-Sittard Geleen, 194.6 km. ===
Stage 2 Result

	Cyclist	Team	Time
1	Manuel Quinziato (ITA)	Liquigas	4h 46' 43"
2	Simone Cadamuro (ITA)	Team Milram	4"
3	Wouter Weylandt (BEL)	Quick-Step–Innergetic	4"

General classification after Stage 2

	Cyclist	Team	Time
1	Tom Boonen (BEL)	Quick-Step–Innergetic	9h 06' 34"
2	Manuel Quinziato (ITA)	Liquigas	1"
3	Stefan Schumacher (GER)	Gerolsteiner	3"

=== 19-08-2006: Beek-Westmalle, 185 km. ===
Stage 3 Result

	Cyclist	Team	Time
1	Tom Boonen (BEL)	Quick-Step–Innergetic	4h 50' 00"
2	Max van Heeswijk (NED)	Discovery Channel	s.t.
3	Baden Cooke (AUS)	Unibet.com	s.t.

General classification after Stage 3

	Cyclist	Team	Time
1	Tom Boonen (BEL)	Quick-Step–Innergetic	13h 12' 20"
2	Manuel Quinziato (ITA)	Liquigas	11"
3	Stefan Schumacher (GER)	Gerolsteiner	13"

=== 20-08-2006: Landgraaf, 16.1 km. (ITT) ===
Stage 4 Result

	Cyclist	Team	Time
1	George Hincapie (USA)	Discovery Channel	19' 58"
2	Vincenzo Nibali (ITA)	Liquigas	s.t.
3	Stefan Schumacher (GER)	Gerolsteiner	7"

General classification after Stage 4

	Cyclist	Team	Time
1	George Hincapie (USA)	Discovery Channel	13h 32' 35"
2	Stefan Schumacher (GER)	Gerolsteiner	3"
3	Vincenzo Nibali (ITA)	Liquigas	11"

=== 21-08-2006: Hasselt-Balen, 183.1 km. ===
Stage 5 Result

	Cyclist	Team	Time
1	Tom Boonen (BEL)	Quick-Step–Innergetic	3h 52' 20"
2	Julian Dean (NZL)	Crédit Agricole	s.t.
3	Simone Cadamuro (ITA)	Team Milram	s.t.

General classification after Stage 5

	Cyclist	Team	Time
1	George Hincapie (USA)	Discovery Channel	17h 24' 55"
2	Stefan Schumacher (GER)	Gerolsteiner	3"
3	Vincenzo Nibali (ITA)	Liquigas	11"

=== 22-08-2006: Bornem-Sint Truiden, 213.9 km. ===
Stage 6 Result

	Cyclist	Team	Time
1	David Kopp (GER)	Gerolsteiner	4h 50' 43"
2	Marco Zanotti (ITA)	Unibet.com	s.t.
3	Philippe Gilbert (BEL)	Française des Jeux	s.t.

General classification after Stage 6

	Cyclist	Team	Time
1	George Hincapie (USA)	Discovery Channel	22h 15' 38"
2	Stefan Schumacher (GER)	Gerolsteiner	3"
3	Vincenzo Nibali (ITA)	Liquigas	11"

=== 23-08-2006: Ans-Ans, 201.2 km. ===
In the last final meters, Stefan Schumacher got hit by an arm from a supporter and as a result made an awkward move away from the supporters to the middle of the road, which resulted in George Hincapie falling down. Before the move it looked like Schumacher was going to become second and Hincapie third, which would make Hincapie the winner with an advantage of 1 second. Since Hincapie crashed he did not take any bonus seconds for ending in the top three and because Schumacher managed to restart his sprint and end third he took 4 bonus seconds and so won by 1 second. The jury took about twenty minutes deciding if Schumacher should be removed to the back of the peloton but in the end they concluded that Schumacher did not make the move on purpose and thus Schumacher won the Eneco Tour 2006. Some reactions:

- Dirk Demol, sports director of Discovery Channel Pro Cycling Team: "If you look at the replay, you can clearly see that George Hincapie was surely going to end in second or third place. Even if he was going to be beaten by Schumacher in the sprint and end third, he would still be first in the overall standings. Surely we will issue a complaint."
- Stefan Schumacher: "I'm not happy right now, it's a shame it has to end this way. For my career it's a big step, because it's my biggest win so far, but still I'm not happy right now.
- Croatian jury president Bruno Valcic: "It was a tough decision for us, but Schumacher clearly got hit by a supporter and surely did not bring George Hincapie down on purpose."

Stage 7 Result

	Cyclist	Team	Time
1	Philippe Gilbert (BEL)	Française des Jeux	5h 05' 16"
2	Manuele Mori (ITA)	Saunier Duval–Prodir	2"
3	Stefan Schumacher (GER)	Gerolsteiner	2"

General classification after Stage 7

	Cyclist	Team	Time
1	Stefan Schumacher (GER)	Gerolsteiner	27h 20' 55"
2	George Hincapie (USA)	Discovery Channel	1"
3	Vincenzo Nibali (ITA)	Liquigas	12"

== General classification ==
The leader of the general classification (ENECO Energie leiderstrui) wears a red jersey.

	Cyclist	Team	Time
1	Stefan Schumacher (GER)	Gerolsteiner	27h 20' 55"
2	George Hincapie (USA)	Discovery Channel	1"
3	Vincenzo Nibali (ITA)	Liquigas	12"
4	Philippe Gilbert (BEL)	Française des Jeux	17"
5	Manuel Quinziato (ITA)	Liquigas	32"
6	Joost Posthuma (NED)	Rabobank	35"
7	Juan Antonio Flecha (ESP)	Rabobank	52"
8	Alessandro Ballan (ITA)	Lampre–Fondital	53"
9	Thomas Dekker (NED)	Rabobank	55"
10	Steffen Wesemann (SUI)	T-Mobile Team	56"

== KOM Classification ==
There was no King Of the Mountains jersey this year. Instead, during some of the climbs bonus seconds were handed out in stages 6 and 7.

== Points Classification ==
The leader of the points classification (Lotto Puntenklassement) wears a white jersey.

	Cyclist	Team	Points
1	Simone Cadamuro (ITA)	Team Milram	91
2	Tom Boonen (BEL)	Quick-Step–Innergetic	90
3	Stefan Schumacher (GER)	Gerolsteiner	59
4	Philippe Gilbert (BEL)	Française des Jeux	57
5	Julian Dean (NZL)	Crédit Agricole	56
=6	Alessandro Ballan (ITA)	Lampre–Fondital	54
=6	Enrico Gasparotto (ITA)	Liquigas	54
=6	Wouter Weylandt (BEL)	Quick-Step–Innergetic	54
9	Fabrizio Guidi (ITA)	Phonak	52
10	Bert Roesems (BEL)	Davitamon–Lotto	48

== Best Young Rider ==
The leader of the Best Young Rider Classification (Topsport Vlaanderen jongerenklassement) wears a yellow jersey.

	Cyclist	Team	Points
1	Stefan Schumacher (GER)	Gerolsteiner	27h 20' 55"
2	Vincenzo Nibali (ITA)	Liquigas	12"
3	Philippe Gilbert (BEL)	Française des Jeux	17"

== Best Team ==
	Team	Time
1	Liquigas	82h 04' 56"
2	Rabobank	11"
3	Discovery Channel	29"

== Jersey progress ==
Stage (Winner)	General classification	Points Classification	Young Rider Classification	Team Classification
Prologue (ITT) (Stefan Schumacher)	Stefan Schumacher	no award	Stefan Schumacher	Discovery Channel
Stage 1 (Tom Boonen)	Tom Boonen	Tom Boonen	Stefan Schumacher	Quick-Step–Innergetic
Stage 2 (Manuel Quinziato)	Tom Boonen	Simone Cadamuro	Stefan Schumacher	Quick-Step–Innergetic
Stage 3 (Tom Boonen)	Tom Boonen	Simone Cadamuro	Stefan Schumacher	Quick-Step–Innergetic
Stage 4 (ITT) (George Hincapie)	George Hincapie	Simone Cadamuro	Stefan Schumacher	Discovery Channel
Stage 5 (Tom Boonen)	George Hincapie	Simone Cadamuro	Stefan Schumacher	Discovery Channel
Stage 6 (David Kopp)	George Hincapie	Simone Cadamuro	Stefan Schumacher	Discovery Channel
Stage 7 (Philippe Gilbert)	Stefan Schumacher	Simone Cadamuro	Stefan Schumacher	Liquigas
Final	Stefan Schumacher	Simone Cadamuro	Stefan Schumacher	Liquigas

== UCI ProTour Points ==
The Eneco Tour 2006 is part of the UCI ProTour and so the riders can earn UCI ProTour Points. Below is states which riders won points and where. Because the Eneco Tour 2006 is a smaller stage race the points given are 3, 2 and 1 for the first three in each stage result. At the end of the tour, the top 10 in the standings receive points accorded as follows: 50, 40, 35, 30, 25, 20, 15, 10, 5 and 2.

	Cyclist	Team	Points
1	Stefan Schumacher (GER)	Gerolsteiner	55
2	George Hincapie (USA)	Discovery Channel	45
3	Vincenzo Nibali (ITA)	Liquigas	37
4	Philippe Gilbert (BEL)	Française des Jeux	34
5	Manuel Quinziato (ITA)	Liquigas	28
6	Joost Posthuma (NED)	Rabobank	21
7	Juan Antonio Flecha (ESP)	Rabobank	15
8	Alessandro Ballan (ITA)	Lampre–Fondital	10
9	Tom Boonen (BEL)	Quick-Step–Innergetic	9
=10	Simone Cadamuro (ITA)	Team Milram	5
=10	Thomas Dekker (NED)	Rabobank	5
12	David Kopp (GER)	Gerolsteiner	3
=13	Julian Dean (NZL)	Crédit Agricole	2
=13	Max van Heeswijk (NED)	Discovery Channel	2
=13	Manuele Mori (ITA)	Saunier Duval–Prodir	2
=13	Steffen Wesemann (SUI)	T-Mobile Team	2
=17	Enrico Gasparotto (ITA)	Liquigas	1
=17	Wouter Weylandt (BEL)	Quick-Step–Innergetic	1
