= 2007 Bayern Rundfahrt =

Race details
- Dates: 30 May–3 June 2007
- Stages: 5
- Distance: 764.7 km (475.2 mi)
- Winning time: 17h 39' 18"

Results
	Winner	Stefan Schumacher (GER)
	Second	Bert Grabsch (GER)
	Third	Jens Voigt (GER)

The 2007 Bayern Rundfahrt was the 28th edition of the Bayern Rundfahrt cycle race and was held on 30 May to 3 June 2007. The race started in Garmisch-Partenkirchen and finished in Fürth. The race was won by Stefan Schumacher.

== General classification ==
Final general classification

Rank	Rider	Time
1	Stefan Schumacher (GER)	17h 39' 18"
2	Bert Grabsch (GER)	+ 9"
3	Jens Voigt (GER)	+ 15"
4	Fränk Schleck (LUX)	+ 25"
5	Andreas Klöden (GER)	+ 30"
6	Sebastian Siedler (GER)	+ 38"
7	Nicki Sørensen (DEN)	+ 51"
8	Fabian Wegmann (GER)	+ 54"
9	Peter Velits (SLO)	+ 57"
10	Stuart O'Grady (AUS)	+ 58"
