= Simone Cadamuro =

Italian cyclist

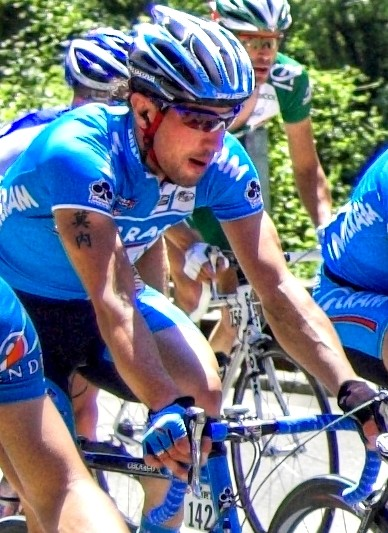
- Cadamuro at the 2006 Tour de Suisse

Personal information
- Full name: Simone Cadamuro
- Born: 28 June 1976 (age 50) San Donà di Piave, Italy
- Height: 1.85 m (6 ft 1 in)
- Weight: 78 kg (172 lb)

Cycling career
- Sport: Cycling
- Discipline: Road
- Role: Rider

Professional teams
- 2002–2005: De Nardi–Pasta Montegrappa
- 2006: Team Milram
- 2007: Kio Ene–Tonazzi–DMT
- 2008–2009: Nippo–Endeka

Major wins
- Stage win, Eneco Tour (2005); 2 Stage wins, Tour de Pologne (2003)

Simone Cadamuro (born 28 June 1976) is an Italian former professional road racing cyclist.

He is a native of San Donà di Piave.

== Major results ==
1998
1st Stage 4a Giro del Friuli Venezia Giulia
1999
3rd La Popolarissima
2000
1st GP Industrie del Marmo
3rd Coppa San Geo
2001
1st Milan-Busseto
2002
1st Stage 3 Okolo Slovenska
2nd Stausee-Rundfahrt Klingnau
4th Poreč Trophy
2003
1st Stages 1 & 3 Tour de Pologne
2004
1st Doha International GP
1st Veenendaal–Veenendaal
1st Stage 3 Tour of Qinghai Lake
3rd Scheldeprijs
3rd Ronde van Drenthe
2005
1st Stage 2 Eneco Tour
3rd Scheldeprijs
7th Doha International GP
8th Gent–Wevelgem
2006
1st Points classification, Eneco Tour
2nd Ronde van Midden-Zeeland
7th Omloop van de Vlaamse Scheldeboorden
2007
1st Stage 2 Flèche du Sud
2008
1st Stages 6 & 7 Tour de Serbie
4th Poreč Trophy
8th Giro di Toscana
10th GP Costa Degli Etruschi
2009
9th Dutch Food Valley Classic
