= 2006 Tirreno–Adriatico =

2006 UCI ProTour, race 2 of 27

Race details
- Dates: 8–14 March 2006
- Stages: 7
- Distance: 1,108.5 km (688.8 mi)
- Winning time: 27h 50' 04"

Results
Jersey awarded to the overall winner	Winner	Thomas Dekker (NED)	(Rabobank)
	Second	Jörg Jaksche (GER)	(Liberty Seguros–Würth)
	Third	Alessandro Ballan (ITA)	(Lampre–Fondital)
Jersey awarded to the points classification winner	Points	Alessandro Petacchi (ITA)	(Team Milram)
Jersey awarded to the mountains classification winner	Mountains	José Joaquín Rojas (ESP)	(Liberty Seguros–Würth)
	Team	(United States) Discovery Channel	

The 41st Tirreno–Adriatico road cycling race took place from 8 March to 14 March 2006, over seven stages. It was won by Dutchman Thomas Dekker of the Rabobank team. The points classification was won by Alessandro Petacchi and the King of the Mountains jersey went to José Joaquín Rojas.

== Teams ==
Twenty-five teams, containing a total of 200 riders, participated in the race:

- Rabobank
- Acqua & Sapone
- AG2R Prévoyance
- Barloworld
- Bouygues Télécom
- Caisse d'Epargne–Illes Balears
- Ceramica Panaria–Navigare
- Cofidis
- Crédit Agricole
- Davitamon–Lotto
- Discovery Channel
- Euskaltel–Euskadi
- Française des Jeux
- Gerolsteiner
- Lampre–Fondital
- Liberty Seguros–Würth
- Liquigas
- Naturino–Sapore di Mare
- Phonak
- Quick-Step–Innergetic
- Saunier Duval–Prodir
- Team CSC
- Team LPR
- Team Milram
- T-Mobile Team

== Route ==
Stage characteristics and winners
Stage	Date	Course	Distance	Type	Winner
1	8 March	Tivoli to Tivoli	167 km (104 mi)	Hilly stage	Paolo Bettini (ITA)
2	9 March	Tivoli to Frascati	171 km (106 mi)	Medium mountain stage	Paolo Bettini (ITA)
3	10 March	Avezzano to Paglieta	183 km (114 mi)	Medium mountain stage	Óscar Freire (ESP)
4	11 March	Paglieta to Civitanova Marche	219 km (136 mi)	Hilly stage	Thor Hushovd (NOR)
5	12 March	Servigliano to Servigliano	20 km (12 mi)	Individual time trial	Fabian Cancellara (SUI)
6	13 March	San Benedetto del Tronto to Torricella Sicura	164 km (102 mi)	Medium mountain stage	Leonardo Bertagnolli (ITA)
7	14 March	Campli to San Benedetto del Tronto	166 km (103 mi)	Hilly stage	Alessandro Petacchi (ITA)

== Stages ==
=== Stage 1 ===
8 March 2006 — Tivoli to Tivoli, 167 km (104 mi)

Stage 1 result

Rank	Rider	Team	Time
1	Paolo Bettini (ITA)	Quick-Step–Innergetic	4h 08' 55"
2	Erik Zabel (GER)	Team Milram	s.t.
3	Thor Hushovd (NOR)	Crédit Agricole	s.t.
4	Mikhaylo Khalilov (UKR)	Team LPR	s.t.
5	Davide Rebellin (ITA)	Gerolsteiner	s.t.

General classification after stage 1

Rank	Rider	Team	Time
1	Paolo Bettini (ITA)	Quick-Step–Innergetic	4h 08' 45"
2	Erik Zabel (GER)	Team Milram	+ 4"
3	Thor Hushovd (NOR)	Crédit Agricole	+ 6"
4	Mikhaylo Khalilov (UKR)	Team LPR	+ 10"
5	Davide Rebellin (ITA)	Gerolsteiner	+ 10"

=== Stage 2 ===
9 March 2006 — Tivoli to Frascati, 171 km (106 mi)

Stage 2 result

Rank	Rider	Team	Time
1	Paolo Bettini (ITA)	Quick-Step–Innergetic	4h 03' 19"
2	Erik Zabel (GER)	Team Milram	s.t.
3	Mikhaylo Khalilov (UKR)	Team LPR	s.t.
4	Alessandro Ballan (ITA)	Lampre–Fondital	s.t.
5	Thor Hushovd (NOR)	Crédit Agricole	s.t.

General classification after stage 2

Rank	Rider	Team	Time
1	Paolo Bettini (ITA)	Quick-Step–Innergetic	8h 11' 54"
2	Erik Zabel (GER)	Team Milram	+ 8"
3	Mikhaylo Khalilov (UKR)	Team LPR	+ 16"
4	Thor Hushovd (NOR)	Crédit Agricole	+ 16"
5	Alessandro Ballan (ITA)	Lampre–Fondital	+ 20"

=== Stage 3 ===
10 March 2006 — Avezzano to Paglieta, 183 km (114 mi)

General Classification leader Paolo Bettini crashed and was forced to retire from the race after 80 km following a tangle with Lars Bak of the CSC team.

Stage 3 result

Rank	Rider	Team	Time
1	Óscar Freire (ESP)	Rabobank	4h 27' 22"
2	Igor Astarloa (ESP)	Barloworld	s.t.
3	Riccardo Ricco (ITA)	Saunier Duval–Prodir	s.t.
4	Rinaldo Nocentini (ITA)	Acqua & Sapone	s.t.
5	Thor Hushovd (NOR)	Crédit Agricole	s.t.

General classification after stage 3

Rank	Rider	Team	Time
1	Óscar Freire (ESP)	Rabobank	12h 39' 26"
2	Alessandro Ballan (ITA)	Lampre–Fondital	+ 10"
3	Davide Rebellin (ITA)	Gerolsteiner	+ 10"
4	Rinaldo Nocentini (ITA)	Acqua & Sapone	+ 10"
5	Alessandro Ballan (ITA)	Lampre–Fondital	+ 10"

=== Stage 4 ===
11 March 2006 — Paglieta to Civitanova Marche, 219 km (136 mi)

Stage 4 result

Rank	Rider	Team	Time
1	Thor Hushovd (NOR)	Crédit Agricole	5h 21' 13"
2	Alessandro Petacchi (ITA)	Team Milram	s.t.
3	Óscar Freire (ESP)	Rabobank	s.t.
4	Filippo Pozzato (ITA)	Quick-Step–Innergetic	s.t.
5	George Hincapie (USA)	Discovery Channel	s.t.

General classification after stage 4

Rank	Rider	Team	Time
1	Óscar Freire (ESP)	Rabobank	18h 00' 35"
2	Alessandro Ballan (ITA)	Lampre–Fondital	+ 14"
3	Davide Rebellin (ITA)	Gerolsteiner	+ 14"
4	Rinaldo Nocentini (ITA)	Acqua & Sapone	+ 14"
5	Massimiliano Gentili (ITA)	Naturino–Sapore di Mare	+ 14"

=== Stage 5 ===
12 March 2006 — Servigliano to Servigliano, 20 km (12 mi) (ITT)

Stage 5 result

Rank	Rider	Team	Time
1	Fabian Cancellara (SUI)	Team CSC	27' 37"
2	Leif Hoste (BEL)	Discovery Channel	+ 3"
3	Thomas Dekker (NED)	Rabobank	+ 18"
4	Jörg Jaksche (GER)	Liberty Seguros–Würth	+ 32"
5	Alessandro Ballan (ITA)	Lampre–Fondital	+ 38"

General classification after stage 5

Rank	Rider	Team	Time
1	Thomas Dekker (NED)	Rabobank	18h 28' 44"
2	Jörg Jaksche (GER)	Liberty Seguros–Würth	+ 14"
3	Alessandro Ballan (ITA)	Lampre–Fondital	+ 20"
4	Paolo Savoldelli (ITA)	Discovery Channel	+ 40"
5	Michael Boogerd (NED)	Rabobank	+ 46"

=== Stage 6 ===
13 March 2006 — San Benedetto del Tronto to Torricella Sicura, 182 km (113 mi)

Stage 6 result

Rank	Rider	Team	Time
1	Leonardo Bertagnolli (ITA)	Cofidis	4h 40' 40"
2	Alessandro Petacchi (ITA)	Team Milram	s.t.
3	Riccardo Ricco (ITA)	Saunier Duval–Prodir	s.t.
4	Filippo Pozzato (ITA)	Quick-Step–Innergetic	s.t.
5	Alessandro Ballan (ITA)	Lampre–Fondital	s.t.

General classification after stage 6

Rank	Rider	Team	Time
1	Thomas Dekker (NED)	Rabobank	23h 09' 24"
2	Jörg Jaksche (GER)	Liberty Seguros–Würth	+ 14"
3	Alessandro Ballan (ITA)	Lampre–Fondital	+ 20"
4	Paolo Savoldelli (ITA)	Discovery Channel	+ 40"
5	Igor Astarloa (ESP)	Barloworld	+ 46"

=== Stage 7 ===
14 March 2006 — Campli to San Benedetto del Tronto, 166 km (103 mi)

Stage 7 result

Rank	Rider	Team	Time
1	Alessandro Petacchi (ITA)	Team Milram	4h 40' 40"
2	Robbie McEwen (AUS)	Davitamon–Lotto	s.t.
3	Paride Grillo (ITA)	Ceramica Panaria–Navigare	s.t.
4	Thor Hushovd (NOR)	Crédit Agricole	s.t.
5	Erik Zabel (GER)	Lampre–Fondital	s.t.

General classification after stage 7

Rank	Rider	Team	Time
1	Thomas Dekker (NED)	Rabobank	27h 50' 04"
2	Jörg Jaksche (GER)	Liberty Seguros–Würth	+ 14"
3	Alessandro Ballan (ITA)	Lampre–Fondital	+ 20"
4	Paolo Savoldelli (ITA)	Discovery Channel	+ 40"
5	Igor Astarloa (ESP)	Barloworld	+ 46"

=== Points classification ===
1. Alessandro Petacchi (ITA) 37 pts
2. Thor Hushovd (NOR) 34
3. Mikhaylo Khalilov (UKR) 28
4. Erik Zabel (GER) 26
5. Óscar Freire (ESP) 25
6. Alessandro Ballan (ITA) 25
7. Riccardo Riccò (ITA) 18
8. Fabian Cancellara (ITA) 17
9. Rinaldo Nocentini (ITA) 17
10. Igor Astarloa (ESP) 16

=== Mountains classification ===
1. José Joaquín Rojas (ESP) 11 pts
2. Daniele Contrini (ITA) 11
3. Matteo Priamo (ITA) 8
4. José Ignacio Gutiérrez (ESP) 7
5. Alessandro Ballan (ITA) 5
6. Vladimir Efimkin (RUS) 5
7. Fortunato Baliani (ITA) 5
8. Joseba Albizu (ESP) 5
9. Giampaolo Cheula (ITA) 5
10. Ivan Basso (ITA) 3

=== Teams Classification ===
1. Discovery Channel 82h 38' 09"
2. Team CSC + 0' 17"
3. Liberty Seguros–Würth + 2' 40"
4. Gerolsteiner + 2' 58"
5. Phonak + 3' 34"
6. Saunier Duval–Prodir + 4' 51"
7. Rabobank + 4' 53"
8. T-Mobile Team + 4' 56"
9. Barloworld + 6' 10"
10. Euskaltel–Euskadi + 6' 53"
