= Alessandro Ballan =

Italian cyclist

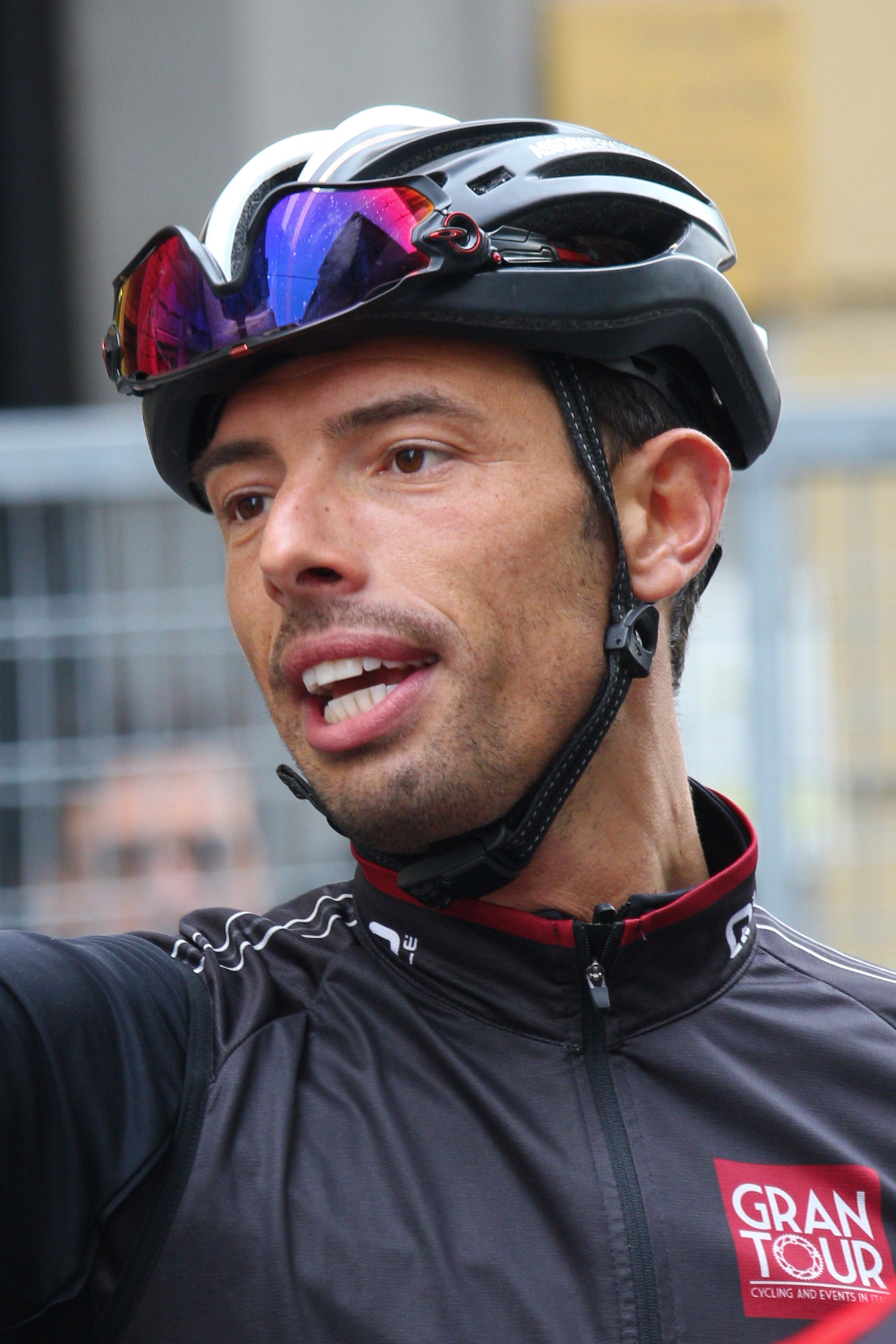
- Ballan at the 2017 Milan–San Remo

Personal information
- Full name: Alessandro Ballan
- Nickname: Bontempino
- Born: 6 November 1979 (age 46) Castelfranco Veneto, Italy
- Height: 1.90 m (6 ft 3 in)
- Weight: 68 kg (150 lb)

Cycling career
- Sport: Cycling
- Discipline: Road
- Role: Rider
- Rider type: Classics specialist

Professional teams
- 2004–2009: Lampre
- 2010–2014: BMC Racing Team

Major wins
- Grand Tours Vuelta a España 1 individual stage (2008) Stage races Three Days of De Panne (2007) Tour de Pologne (2009) One-day races and Classics World Road Race Championships (2008) Tour of Flanders (2007) Vattenfall Cyclassics (2007)
Medal record
Representing Italy
Men's road bicycle racing
UCI Road World Championships
Gold medal – first place	2008 Varese	Elite Men's Road Race
Representing BMC Racing Team
World Championships
Silver medal – second place	2012 Valkenburg	Team Time Trial

Alessandro Ballan (born 6 November 1979) is an Italian former professional road bicycle racer who most recently rode for UCI World Tour team BMC Racing Team. He is best known for winning the World Road Race Championships, in 2008. Although he possessed a frame that was usually more associated with climbing, Ballan established himself as a leading spring classics contender. His nickname, Bontempino, is a diminutive reference to Guido Bontempi, to whom he bears a resemblance.

== Career ==
Ballan turned professional in 2004 with the Lampre team. Despite a decent amateur career, Ballan was not sought after by professional teams, and required a little bit of help to secure a professional contract. In his first season, Ballan worked as a domestique for Romāns Vainšteins and Gianluca Bortolami.

=== 2005 ===
In 2005, Ballan was given the opportunity to aim for high placings in the spring classics and achieved a stage victory and second overall in the Three Days of De Panne, along with sixth place in the Tour of Flanders, having attacked the leading group with 37 km to go. Later in the season, he achieved his first ProTour victory in taking stage 4 of the Eneco Tour of Benelux.

=== 2006 ===
In 2006, Ballan started his spring classics campaign as a highly rated contender, given his performances in 2005 and his success in the warm-up races in winning the Trofeo Laigueglia, a second place to Tom Boonen in the E3 Prijs Vlaanderen and third overall at the Tirreno–Adriatico. Ballan was a leading protagonist in the classics: he took fifth at the Tour of Flanders and followed this with third at Paris–Roubaix, following the disqualifications of Peter Van Petegem, Vladimir Gusev and Leif Hoste. Later in the season, Ballan further proved his talent with a second placing in stage 12 of the Tour de France and a third place overall in the Tour de Pologne. Ballan finished in sixth place in the individual rankings of the 2006 UCI ProTour.

=== 2007 ===
In 2007 Ballan suffered a broken collarbone during Tirreno–Adriatico. Despite this injury, Ballan worked hard in Milan–San Remo, although Ballan's teamleader Daniele Bennati did not win the race. Nearly two weeks later, Ballan won the Three Days of De Panne after an escape during stage 1. Ballan did not win the stage, but beat his nearest opponent Luca Paolini during the closing time trial, in which Ballan finished 10. On 8 April, Ballan took a prestigious win at the Tour of Flanders in a close sprint finish ahead of local favourite Leif Hoste of Belgium. Ballan is the first Italian to win the Tour of Flanders and the Three Days of De Panne in the same season. On 19 August he won the Vattenfall Cyclassics with an attack in the final kilometer, holding off all of the sprinters, including former winner Óscar Freire and promising young German sprinter Gerald Ciolek, to take his second one-day classic of the season.

=== 2008 ===
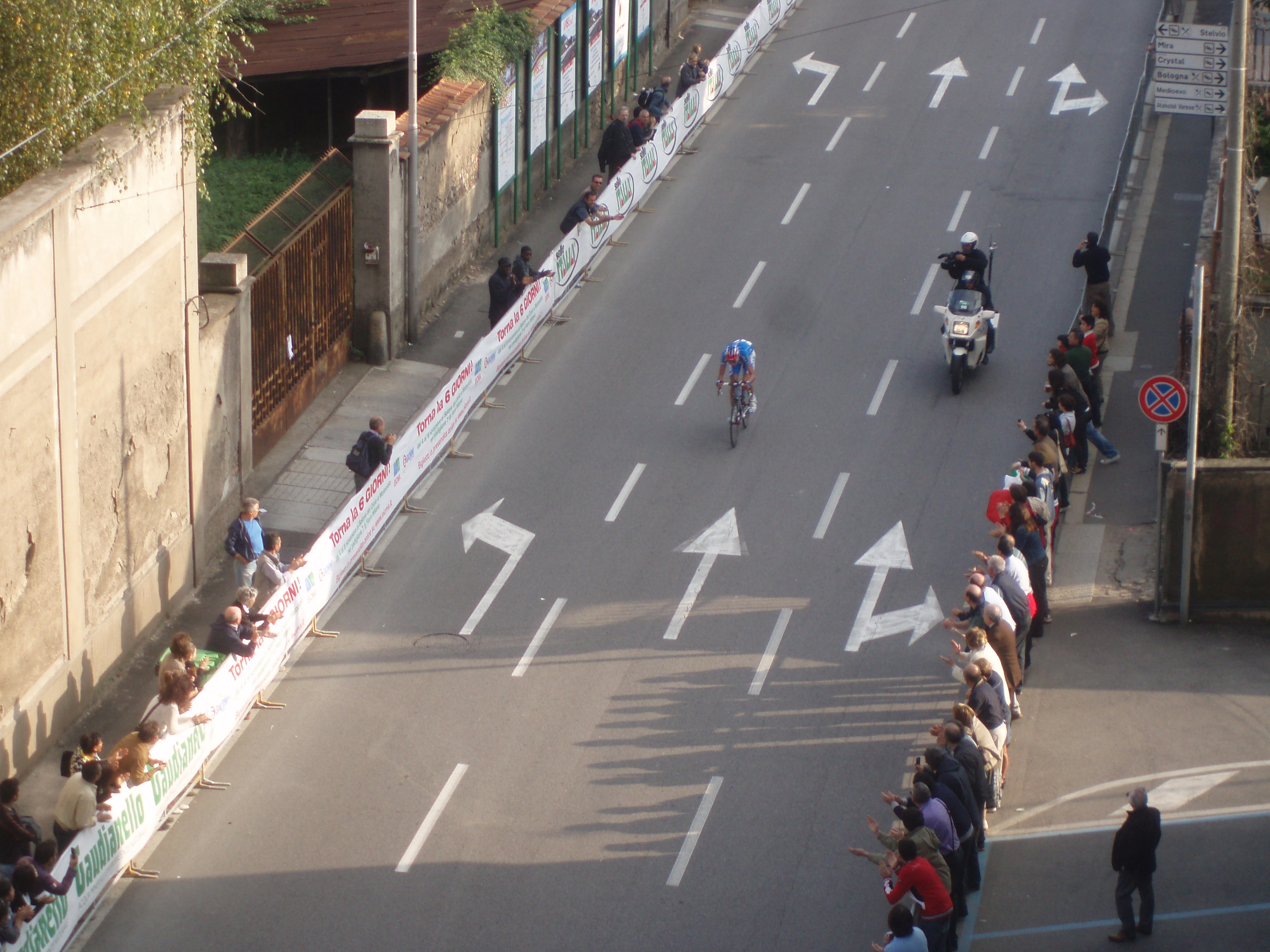
Ballan leading the 2008 UCI Road World Championships – Men's road race in Varese

His spring of 2008 wasn't as prolific as 2007 although he was involved in the decisive break of Paris–Roubaix and rode hard to a third place behind past winners Tom Boonen and Fabian Cancellara together with whom he entered the Roubaix Velodrome losing out in a sprint to the line. This came a week after a fourth place in defence of his Tour of Flanders crown. He again opted to skip his home tour – the Giro d'Italia, but raced in both the other grand tours – the Tour de France and the Vuelta a España, winning a mountain stage and wearing the leader's jersey in the latter.

In September 2008 Ballan won the UCI Road Race World Championships. In a race in which 2007 champion and Italian team mate Paolo Bettini was favourite, Ballan was again involved in the decisive break on the final lap of the undulating Varese circuit. From a group of 12 riders, including 2 Italian team mates Damiano Cunego and Davide Rebellin, Ballan attacked from 1500 metres out and held off the sprint to win by 3 seconds in front of his home crowd.

=== 2009 ===
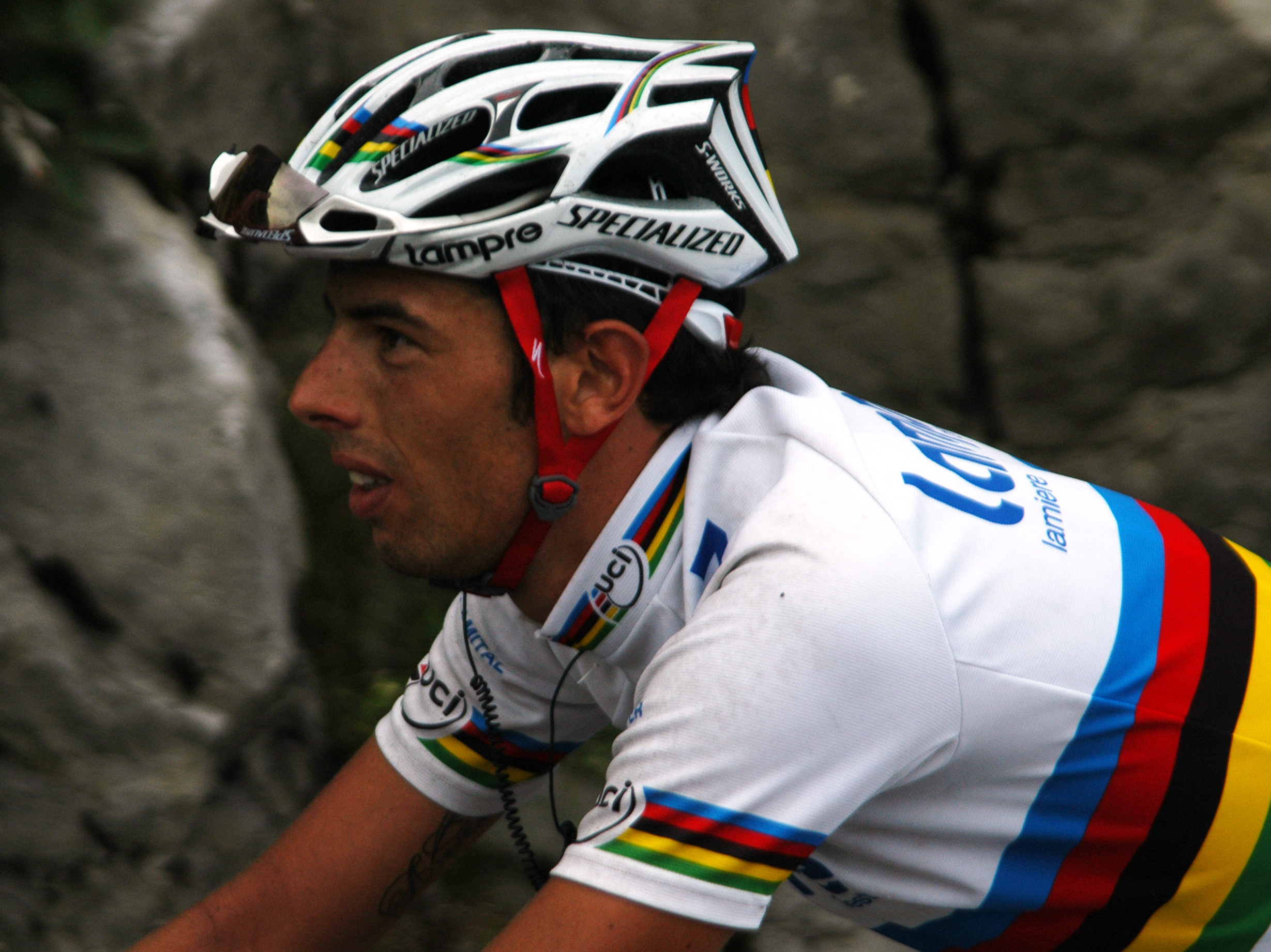
Ballan at the 2009 Tour de France

As if suffering from the curse of the rainbow jersey, Ballan was diagnosed with cytomegalovirus in March 2009 and as a result was unable to contest that year's Spring Classics and Giro. During the Tour de France he had an average performance, only coming into the picture in the 19th stage as part of a breakaway which was caught before the finish line.

In August 2009, he won the Tour of Poland. Ballan signed with BMC Racing Team for the 2010 season.

=== 2012 ===
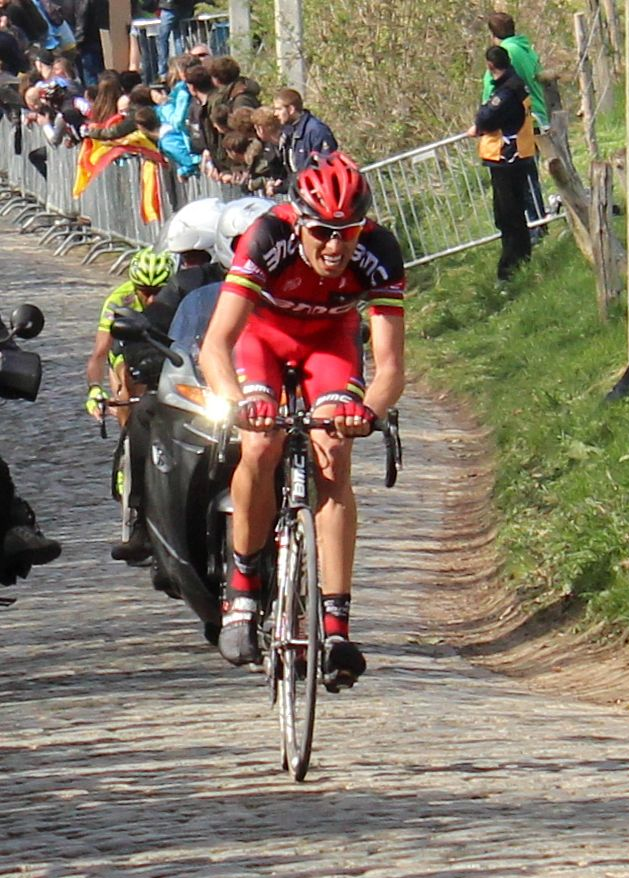
Ballan at the 2012 Tour of Flanders

At the Tour of Flanders in April, Ballan placed third after initiating a break with 25 km to go. Boonen and Pozzato took up the chase and placed ahead of Ballan in the final sprint. In December, Ballan suffered a severe training crash during a descent as he was riding with his team in Spain. He fractured his left femur, broke a rib and ruptured his spleen, which had to be removed. He spent a little more than a week in intensive care.

== Doping sanction ==
Ballan is one of 27 people indicted in Italy as part of the Mantova doping investigation. In 2010 when the enquiry was announced he was subsequently suspended by the BMC cycling team. He was later cleared by BMC and allowed to race again on 28 May 2010. In November 2013 it was reported that CONI were seeking a 2-year ban for violation of article 2.2 of the WADA code.

In January 2014, CONI handed Ballan a two-year suspension. His contract with BMC Racing Team was subsequently terminated.

Late 2015, his suspension was overturned in court, and Ballan was cleared of any wrongdoing.

In 2016, Ballan had attempted to get a contract as professional cyclist, but was unable to do so and thus retired.

== Career achievements ==
=== Major results ===
2001
3rd Trofeo Città di San Vendemiano
2002
3rd Overall Giro della Regione Friuli Venezia Giulia
2003
1st Trofeo Zsšdi
2nd Overall Giro della Regione Friuli Venezia Giulia
2nd Circuito del Porto
3rd Trofeo Gianfranco Bianchin
4th Trofeo Città di Brescia
2005 (2 pro wins)
1st Stage 4 Eneco Tour
2nd Overall Three Days of De Panne

1st Stage 1

3rd Classic Haribo
6th Tour of Flanders
2006 (1)
1st Trofeo Laigueglia
2nd E3 Prijs Vlaanderen
3rd Overall Tirreno–Adriatico
3rd Overall Tour de Pologne
3rd Paris–Roubaix
4th Road race, National Road Championships
4th Milano–Torino
4th Trofeo Città di Borgomanero
5th Tour of Flanders
8th Overall Eneco Tour
8th Milan–San Remo
2007 (3)
1st Overall Three Days of De Panne
1st Tour of Flanders
1st Vattenfall Cyclassics
4th Clásica de San Sebastián
5th Overall Tour de Pologne

1st Stage 1 (TTT)

8th Firenze–Pistoia
9th Coppa Sabatini
2008 (2)
1st Road race, UCI Road World Championships
Vuelta a España

1st Stage 7
Held & after Stage 7
Held after Stages 7–8

2nd GP Ouest-France
2nd Monte Paschi Eroica
3rd Paris–Roubaix
4th Tour of Flanders
4th Coppa Bernocchi
7th Overall Three Days of De Panne
7th Giro del Piemonte
2009 (2)
1st Overall Tour de Pologne

1st Stage 5

3rd Overall Giro di Sardegna
5th Trofeo Laigueglia
2010
3rd Road race, National Road Championships
5th Overall Tour de Pologne
6th Grand Prix Cycliste de Québec
10th Grand Prix Cycliste de Montréal
2011
2nd Montepaschi Strade Bianche
4th Milan–San Remo
6th Paris–Roubaix
7th Trofeo Laigueglia
2012 (2)
1st Giro di Toscana
1st Stage 7 Eneco Tour
1st Stage 1 (TTT) Giro del Trentino
2nd Team time trial, UCI Road World Championships
3rd Paris–Roubaix
3rd Tour of Flanders
4th Strade Bianche
8th Milan–San Remo
9th E3 Harelbeke

=== Grand Tour general classification results timeline ===
Grand Tour	2006	2007	2008	2009	2010	2011	2012	2013
Giro d'Italia	—	—	—	—	—	—	103	—
Tour de France	67	88	94	95	87	—	—	—
Vuelta a España	—	—	DNF	DNF	—	—	63	—

=== Classics results timeline ===
Monument	2004	2005	2006	2007	2008	2009	2010	2011	2012	2013
Milan–San Remo	—	52	8	55	16	—	64	4	8	—
Tour of Flanders	82	6	4	1	4	—	35	12	3	—
Paris–Roubaix	DNF	47	3	61	3	—	—	6	3	—
Liège–Bastogne–Liège	DNF	—	19	—	—	—	—	—	—	—
Giro di Lombardia	—	DNF	56	DNF	14	29	—	—	—	—

=== Major championship results timeline ===
Championship	2004	2005	2006	2007	2008	2009	2010	2011	2012	2013
World Championships	—	—	88	52	1	41	—	—	—	—

Legend
—	Did not compete
DNF	Did not finish

Sporting positions
Preceded by Óscar Freire	Vattenfall Cyclassics; 2007	Succeeded by Robbie McEwen
Preceded by Jens Voigt	Tour de Pologne; 2009	Succeeded by Dan Martin
