= Manuel Quinziato =

Italian road racing cyclist

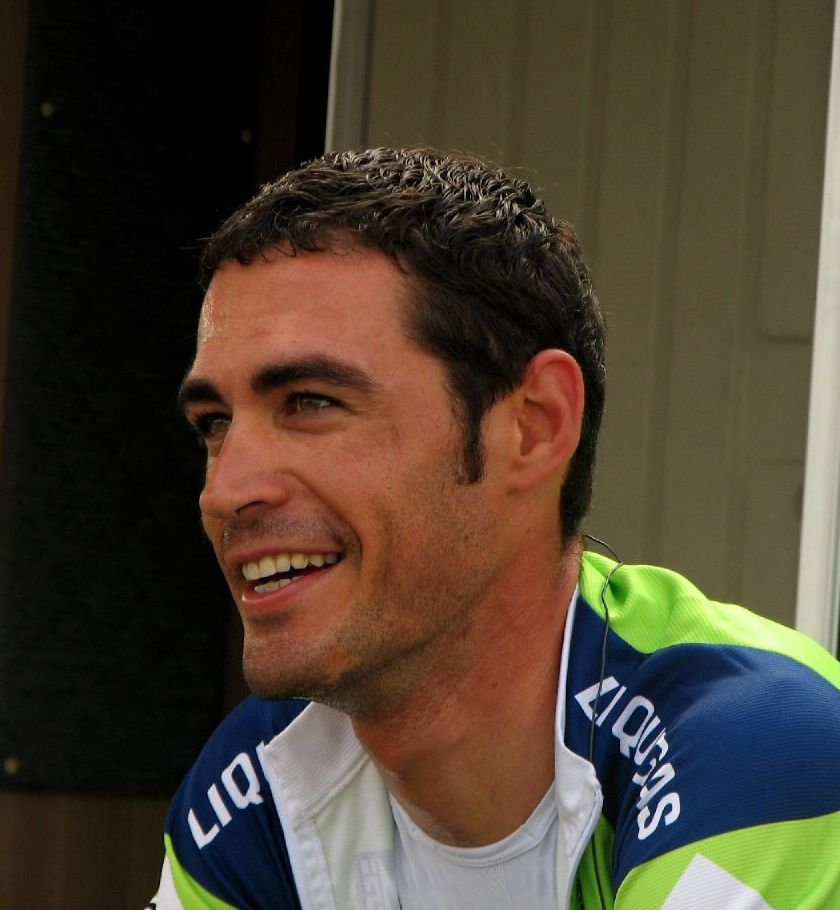
- Quinziato at the 2007 Eneco Tour

Personal information
- Full name: Manuel Quinziato
- Born: 30 October 1979 (age 46) Bolzano, Italy
- Height: 1.85 m (6 ft 1 in)
- Weight: 74 kg (163 lb)

Cycling career
- Sport: Cycling
- Current team: Retired
- Discipline: Road
- Role: Rider

Professional teams
- 2002–2004: Lampre–Daikin
- 2005: Saunier Duval–Prodir
- 2006–2010: Liquigas
- 2011–2017: BMC Racing Team

Major wins
- Grand Tours Tour de France 1 TTT stage (2015) Vuelta a España 1 TTT stage (2008) Single-day races and Classics National Time Trial Championships (2016)
Medal record
Men's road bicycle racing
Representing BMC Racing Team
World Championships
Gold medal – first place	2014 Ponferrada	Team time trial
Gold medal – first place	2015 Richmond	Team Time Trial
Silver medal – second place	2012 Valkenburg	Team time trial
Silver medal – second place	2016 Doha	Team Time Trial

Manuel Quinziato (born 30 October 1979) is an Italian former road racing cyclist, who rode professionally between 2002 and 2017 for the Lampre, Saunier Duval–Prodir, Liquigas–Doimo and BMC Racing Team squads. During his career, Quinziato took five victories, including stage victories at the Eneco Tour in 2006 and 2015, and the Italian National Time Trial Championships in 2016. He was also a member of two world championship-winning team time trial squads with the BMC Racing Team in 2014 and 2015.

== Major results ==
1997
3rd Team pursuit, UCI Junior Track Cycling World Championships
2001
1st Time trial, UEC European Under-23 Road Championships
1st Stage 1 Giro delle Regioni
1st Stage 2 Grand Prix Guillaume Tell
3rd Coppa Città di Asti
2002
4th Overall Tour of Belgium
2003
2nd Time trial, National Road Championships
2004
3rd Japan Cup
8th Giro del Piemonte
9th Overall Tour of Belgium
2005
8th Classic Haribo
9th Overall Tour of Qatar
10th Trofeo Laigueglia
2006
3rd Time trial, National Road Championships
5th Overall Eneco Tour

1st Stage 2

6th Overall Danmark Rundt
9th Chrono des Nations
2007
3rd Time trial, National Road Championships
4th E3 Prijs Vlaanderen
4th Grand Prix de Fourmies
2008
1st Stage 1 (TTT) Vuelta a España
2nd Overall Three Days of De Panne
2nd Chrono des Nations
2009
4th Overall Three Days of De Panne
9th Paris–Roubaix
9th Gent–Wevelgem
2010
10th Overall Three Days of De Panne
2011
8th Omloop Het Nieuwsblad
2012
2nd Team time trial, UCI Road World Championships
9th Overall Tour of Belgium
2014
1st Team time trial, UCI Road World Championships
2015
1st Team time trial, UCI Road World Championships
1st Stage 3 (TTT) Critérium du Dauphiné
1st Stage 9 (TTT) Tour de France
1st Stage 7 Eneco Tour
2016
1st Time trial, National Road Championships
1st Stage 1 (TTT) Tirreno–Adriatico
1st Stage 5 (TTT) Eneco Tour
2nd Team time trial, UCI Road World Championships
4th Overall Tour of Qatar
2017
1st Stage 1 (TTT) Tirreno–Adriatico
3rd Time trial, National Road Championships

=== Grand Tour general classification results timeline ===
Grand Tour	2003	2004	2005	2006	2007	2008	2009	2010	2011	2012	2013	2014	2015	2016	2017
Giro d'Italia	86	—	—	—	—	—	106	—	—	—	—	112	—	117	133
Tour de France	—	—	131	80	113	130	—	162	115	109	85	—	120	—	—
Vuelta a España	—	94	—	—	—	DNF	126	—	131	—	—	68	—	—	—

Legend
—	Did not compete
DNF	Did not finish
