= Stefan Schumacher =

German road bicycle racer

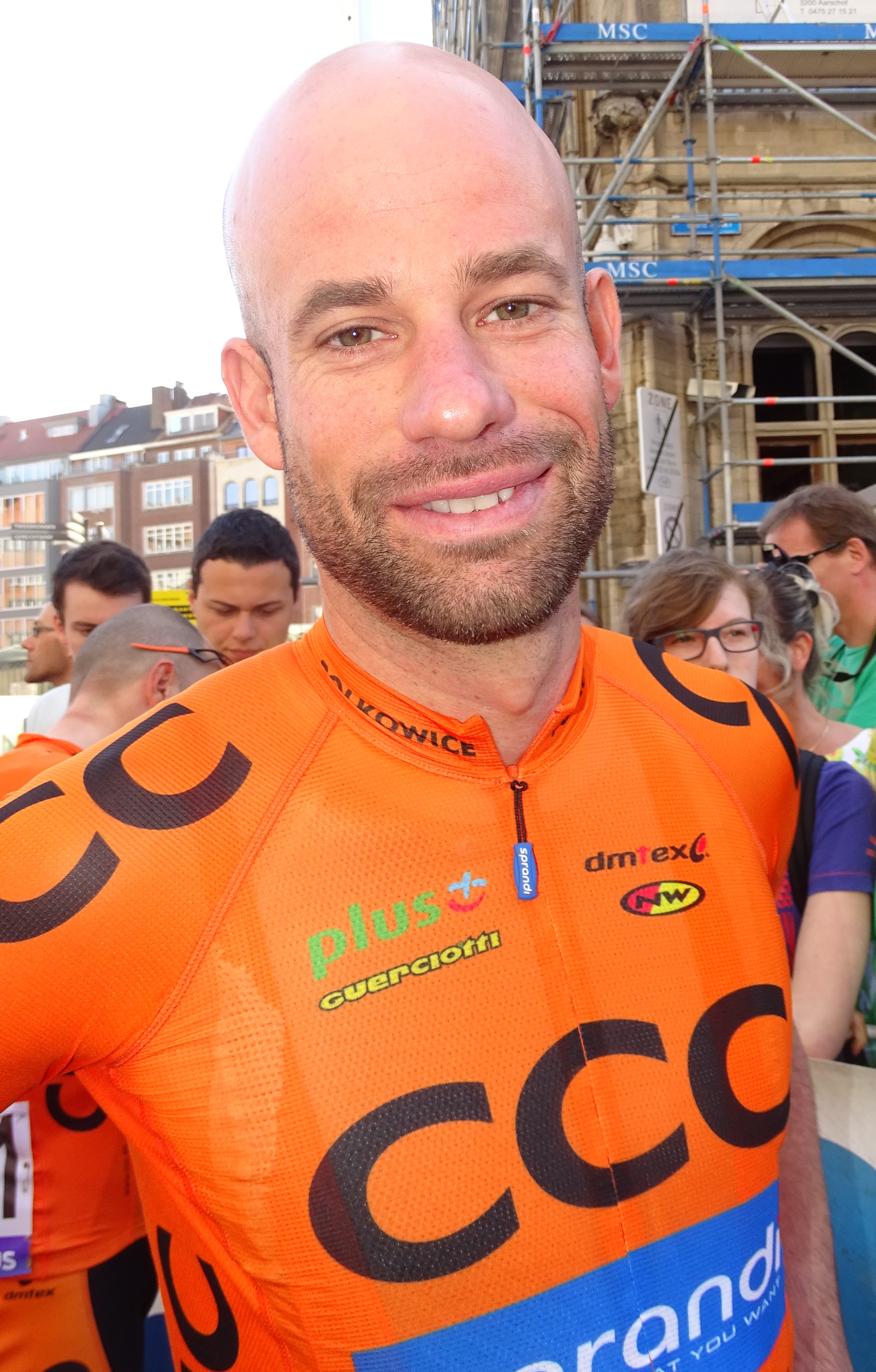
- Schumacher at the 2015 Brabantse Pijl

Personal information
- Full name: Stefan Schumacher
- Born: 21 July 1981 (age 45) Ostfildern-Ruit, West Germany
- Height: 1.83 m (6 ft 0 in)
- Weight: 68 kg (150 lb)

Cycling career
- Sport: Cycling
- Current team: Retired
- Discipline: Road
- Role: Rider
- Rider type: All-rounder; Time-trialist

Amateur team
- 2001: Telekom-Jan Ullrich

Professional teams
- 2002–2003: Team Telekom
- 2004: Team Lamonta
- 2005: Shimano–Memory Corp
- 2006–2008: Gerolsteiner
- 2010–2011: Miche
- 2012–2014: Christina Watches–Onfone
- 2015: CCC–Sprandi–Polkowice
- 2016: Christina Jewelry Pro Cycling
- 2017: Kuwait–Cartucho.es

Major wins
- Grand Tours Giro d'Italia 2 individual stages (2006) Stage races Eneco Tour (2006) Tour de Pologne (2006) Tour de Serbie (2012) Tour of China II (2012) One-day races and Classics Amstel Gold Race (2007)
Medal record
Representing Germany
Men's road bicycle racing
World Championships
| Bronze medal – third place | 2007 Stuttgart | Men's road race |

Stefan Schumacher (born 21 July 1981) is a German former professional road racing cyclist. Schumacher won the bronze medal in the road race at the 2007 UCI Road World Championships, two stages in the 2006 Giro d'Italia and two stages in the 2008 Tour de France. After positive results on doping products in the 2008 Tour de France and the 2008 Summer Olympics, he received a suspension for two years, later reduced by some months. After his suspension, he came back as a professional cyclist before retiring in 2017.

== Career ==
First professionally employed with Team Telekom in 2002, he was released the following year. In 2006, he made his UCI ProTour debut with Gerolsteiner after posting impressive continental circuits results on the UCI Europe Tour.

Schumacher has been involved in a series of controversial incidents during his career. He was implicated in a doping case in 2005 when he tested positive for an amphetamine. His mother, a doctor, had prescribed an asthma medication after failing to find it on the World Anti-Doping Agency's list of banned substances, and checking with the appropriate Dutch agency. He was cleared by the German Cycling Federation of a doping offence.

=== Gerolsteiner (2006–08) ===
In 2006 Schumacher, now riding for Gerolsteiner, won the Eneco Tour of Benelux by one second after colliding with his main rival George Hincapie in the closing metres of the final stage, when time bonuses were available for the leading finishers. Schumacher claimed he had collided first with a spectator and the race jury accepted his story.

Following his third place in the road race at the 2007 UCI Road World Championships in his home town of Stuttgart, Schumacher was arrested for drunken driving. Four months later he revealed that the blood test taken at the time of his arrest had shown traces of amphetamines, whilst denying that he had knowingly taken drugs or had any knowledge of how the positive test had come about. Following a rule change in 2004 amphetamines were no longer on WADA's out-of-competition banned list; as a result the German federation again exonerated him.

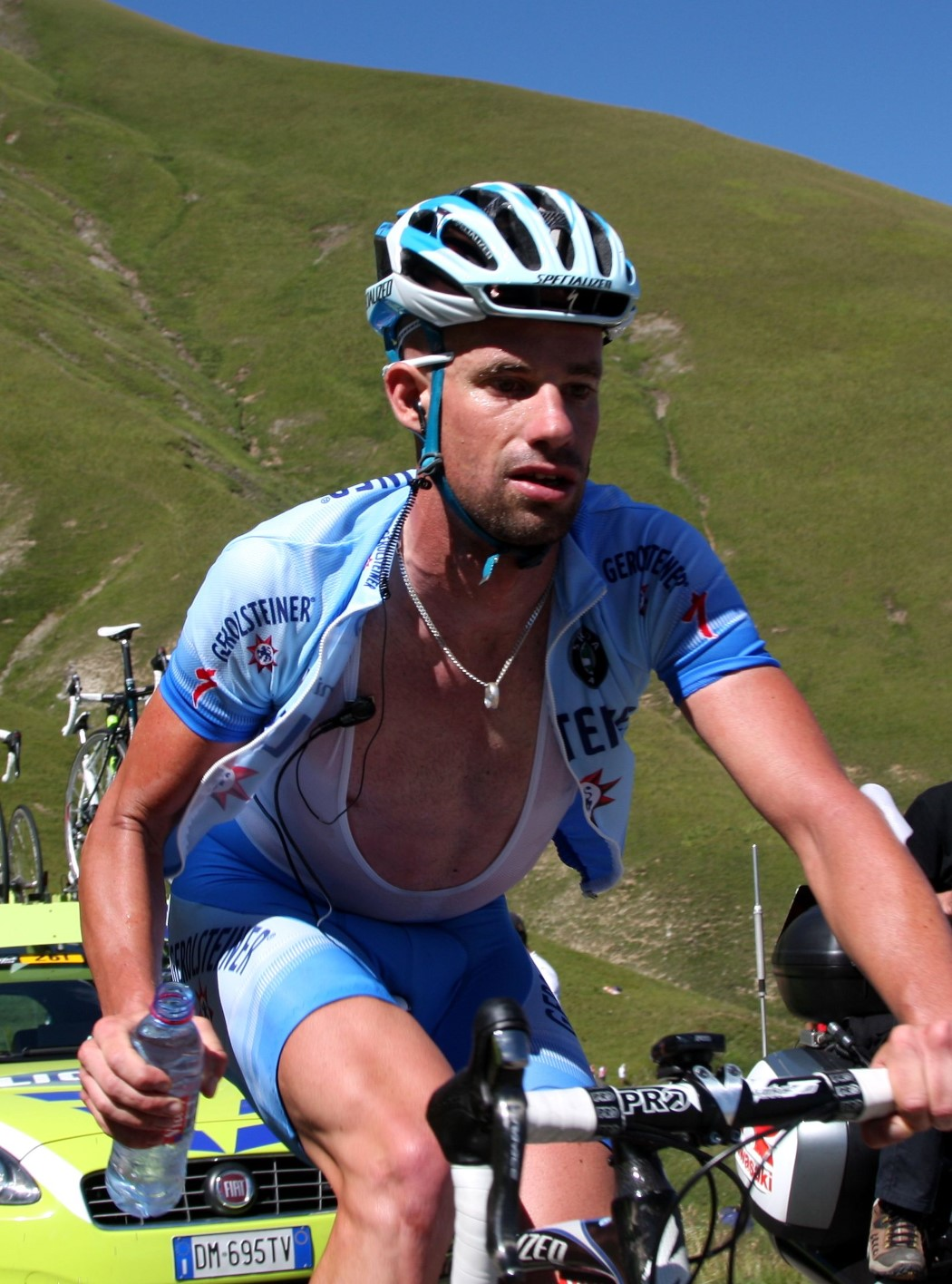
Schumacher at the 2008 Tour de France

In the 2008 Tour de France, Schumacher, riding as leader of Gerolsteiner, won both time trials, beating Swiss favourite Fabian Cancellara, and took the yellow jersey of race leader after the first. After Gerolsteiner was announced to be folding, Schumacher signed a two-year contract with Quick-Step.

=== Doping suspension ===
On 6 October 2008 the media reported that Schumacher had tested positive for the controlled substance continuous erythropoietin receptor activator (CERA), a new generation of erythropoietin (EPO), in a blood sample taken during the 2008 Tour de France. CERA was also the drug for which Italian cyclists Riccardo Riccò and Leonardo Piepoli tested positive during the Tour de France. The German cycling federation was likely to take disciplinary action, however Schumacher continued to assert his innocence and believed he was eligible to ride in the 2009 season and having a contract with Quick-Step. Quick-Step manager Patrick Lefevere stated that Schumacher's contract would not be honored.

On 19 February 2009 Schumacher was banned for two years by the Union Cycliste Internationale (UCI). In January 2010, the Court of Arbitration for Sport (CAS) reduced Schumacher's ban, allowing him to ride again as from August 2010.

In April 2009 Schumacher's name was raised in connection with a positive test for performance-enhancing drugs at the 2008 Summer Olympics. Both his "A" and "B" samples tested positive for CERA. Schumacher was disqualified after these positive tests; he appealed against this to CAS, but dropped his appeal in April 2010.

=== Post-suspension ===
Schumacher's ban ended in August 2010. He came back to ride for the Miche team, and joined Christina Watches–Onfone for the 2012 season. In March 2013 Schumacher confessed to doping in an interview with the news magazine Der Spiegel. He stated he started doping in his mid-twenties and used "EPO, growth hormone and corticosteroids". He also said that his former team Gerolsteiner tolerated doping and it became as banal as "having a plate of pasta after training".

== Major results ==
2001
5th Rund um den Henninger Turm U23
2002
8th Overall Peace Race

1st Young rider classification

10th Overall Niedersachsen Rundfahrt

1st Young rider classification

2003
9th Overall Niedersachsen Rundfahrt
2004
1st Druivenkoers Overijse
1st Mountains classification, Sachsen Tour
1st Mountains classification, Rheinland-Pfalz Rundfahrt
2nd Road race, National Road Championships
2nd Overall Jadranska Magistrala

1st Mountains classification

2nd Overall Hessen-Rundfahrt
3rd Poreč Trophy
4th GP Triberg-Schwarzwald
5th Rund um Köln
8th Rund um Düren
10th Overall Bayern Rundfahrt

1st Young rider classification
1st Stage 6

2005
1st Overall Rheinland-Pfalz Rundfahrt

1st Stages 1, 2, 3 & 4b (ITT)

1st Overall Ster Elektrotoer
1st Overall Niedersachsen Rundfahrt
2nd Rund um Köln
2nd Hel van het Mergelland
9th Grand Prix Rudy Dhaenens
9th Veenendaal–Veenendaal
9th Rund um den Henninger Turm
2006
1st Overall Tour de Pologne

1st Stages 6 & 7

1st Overall Eneco Tour of Benelux

1st Young rider classification
1st Prologue

1st Overall Circuit Cycliste Sarthe
Giro d'Italia

1st Stages 3 & 18
Held after Stages 3–4

1st Stage 4 (ITT) Sachsen Tour
6th Rund um den Henninger Turm
9th Amstel Gold Race
2007
1st Overall Bayern Rundfahrt

1st Stage 4 (ITT)

1st Amstel Gold Race
3rd Road race, UCI Road World Championships
4th Overall Tirreno–Adriatico

1st Stage 5 (ITT)

2008
1st Stage 4 (ITT) Bayern Rundfahrt
~~Tour de France~~

~~1st Stages 4 (ITT) & 20 (ITT)~~

2nd Time trial, National Road Championships
3rd GP Triberg-Schwarzwald
2011
Vuelta a Asturias

1st Stages 1 & 2b (ITT)

3rd Grand Prix of Aargau Canton
4th Overall Vuelta a la Comunidad de Madrid
4th Overall Tour of Azerbaijan (Iran)

1st Prologue & Stage 5

7th Coppa Sabatini
8th Overall Settimana Internazionale di Coppi e Bartali
9th Giro dell'Appennino
10th Coppa Città di Stresa, Gran Premio Nobili Rubinetterie
2012
1st Overall Tour of China II

1st Prologue & Stage 4 (ITT)

1st Overall Tour de Serbie

1st Stage 3

2nd Overall Szlakiem Grodów Piastowskich
2nd Overall Tour of China I

1st Stage 1 (TTT)

3rd Overall Tour de San Luis (Note: Promoted one position after Alberto Contador's results were disqualified following his backdated two-year ban in February 2012.)
5th Rogaland GP
7th Tallinn–Tartu GP
8th Overall Danmark Rundt
8th Ronde van Drenthe
2013
3rd Time trial, National Road Championships
3rd Overall Tour d'Algérie

1st Stage 1

3rd Overall Tour of Estonia
5th Overall Tour de Blida
6th Overall Szlakiem Grodów Piastowskich
7th Overall Sibiu Cycling Tour

1st Stage 3a (ITT)

2014
1st Stage 3 (ITT) Szlakiem Grodów Piastowskich
1st Stage 3 (ITT) Tour de Beauce
2015
3rd Time trial, National Road Championships
8th Overall Czech Cycling Tour
2016
1st Overall Tour du Maroc
9th Overall Tour of Iran (Azerbaijan)
9th Gran Premio della Costa Etruschi
