= 2008 GP Ouest-France =

2008 UCI ProTour, race 12 of 15

Race details
- Dates: August 25
- Stages: 1
- Distance: 229.2 km (142.4 mi)
- Winning time: 5h 42' 44"

Results
	Winner	Pierrick Fédrigo (FRA)	(Bouygues Télécom)
	Second	Alessandro Ballan (ITA)	(Lampre)
	Third	David López (ESP)	(Caisse d'Epargne)

The 2008 GP Ouest–France cycling road race took place on August 25, 2008, in France and was won by Pierrick Fédrigo of Bouygues Télécom.

== Results ==
	Cyclist	Team	Time
1	Pierrick Fédrigo (FRA)	Bouygues Télécom	5h 42' 44"
2	Alessandro Ballan (ITA)	Lampre	s.t.
3	David López (ESP)	Caisse d'Epargne	+3"
4	Allan Davis (AUS)	Mitsubishi–Jartazi	+13"
5	José Joaquín Rojas (ESP)	Caisse d'Epargne	s.t.
6	Arnaud Gérard (FRA)	Française des Jeux	s.t.
7	Greg Van Avermaet (BEL)	Silence–Lotto	s.t.
8	Romain Feillu (FRA)	Agritubel	s.t.
9	Geoffroy Lequatre (FRA)	Agritubel	s.t.
10	Manuele Mori (ITA)	Scott–American Beef	s.t.
