= 2008 E3 Prijs Vlaanderen =

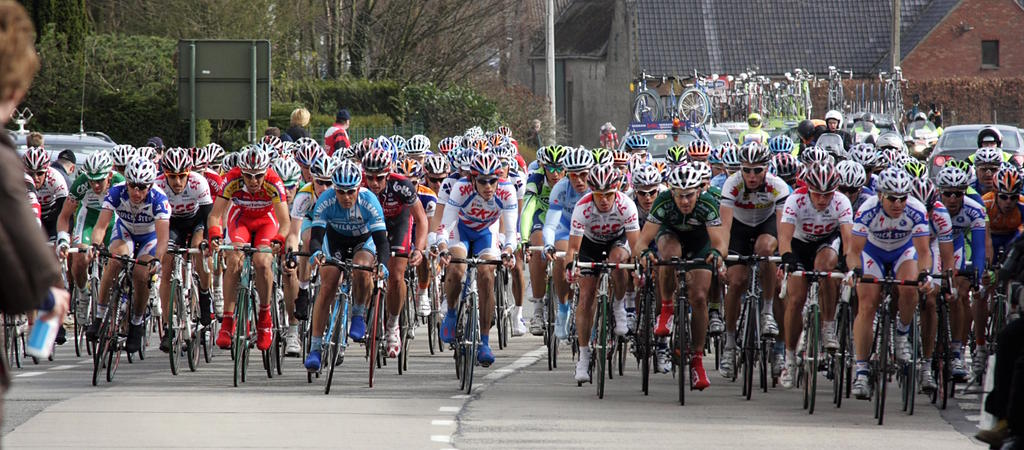
- Peloton during 2008 E3 Prijs Vlaanderen

Race details
- Dates: 29 March 2008
- Stages: 1
- Distance: 203 km (126 mi)
- Winning time: 4h 57' 03"

Results
	Winner	Kurt Asle Arvesen (NOR)	(Team CSC)
	Second	David Kopp (GER)	(Cycle Collstrop)
	Third	Greg Van Avermaet (BEL)	(Silence–Lotto)

The 2008 E3 Prijs Vlaanderen was the 51st edition of the E3 Harelbeke cycle race and was held on 29 March 2008. The race started and finished in Harelbeke. The race was won by Kurt Asle Arvesen of the CSC team.

== General classification ==
Final general classification

Rank	Rider	Team	Time
1	Kurt Asle Arvesen (NOR)	Team CSC	4h 57' 03"
2	David Kopp (GER)	Cycle Collstrop	+ 5"
3	Greg Van Avermaet (BEL)	Silence–Lotto	+ 5"
4	Thomas Voeckler (FRA)	Bouygues Télécom	+ 5"
5	Janek Tombak (EST)	Mitsubishi–Jartazi	+ 5"
6	Bernhard Eisel (AUT)	Team High Road	+ 26"
7	Matti Breschel (DEN)	Team CSC	+ 1' 20"
8	Tom Boonen (BEL)	Quick-Step	+ 1' 20"
9	Stijn Devolder (BEL)	Quick-Step	+ 1' 20"
10	Staf Scheirlinckx (BEL)	Cofidis	+ 1' 20"
