= 2005 Eneco Tour =

2005 UCI ProTour, race 20 of 27

Race details
- Dates: 3 to 10 August 2005
- Stages: 7
- Distance: 1,230 km (764.3 mi)
- Winning time: 29h 08' 01"

Results
	Winner	Bobby Julich (USA)	(Team CSC)
	Second	Erik Dekker (NED)	(Rabobank)
	Third	Lief Hoste (BEL)	(Discovery Channel)

The 2005 Eneco Tour of Benelux road cycling race took place from August 3 to August 10. The Eneco tour is the continuation of the Tour of the Netherlands. This first edition covered parts of the Netherlands, Belgium and Germany. 184 cyclists and 23 cycling teams participated. 20 are UCI ProTour teams, the three remaining are Shimano Memory-Corp and the Belgian teams MrBookmaker and Chocolade Jacques. The winner, Bobby Julich (Team CSC), won the last stage, an individual time trial with a time of 31'14". This launched him from the twelfth place 12 to the first. Leif Hoste (Discovery Channel), thirteenth, became second. Max van Heeswijk (DSC) wore the red jersey two days (the 2nd and the 3rd) and Rik Verbrugghe five days.

This edition was somewhat tainted by an incident during stage 4. Near Stavelot, the peloton were sent in the wrong direction, while the handful of men ahead were on the correct course. As a result, their lead grew to about 15 minutes, which would have made it nearly impossible for anyone else to attain the overall victory, destroying the appeal of the race. The jury decided that the leaders would have to halt until the peloton's lag was reduced to what it was before, but they initially refused. Eventually, they had to be halted by the police, causing leader Bart Dockx to sit on the ground by way of protest.

In the final time trial, Bobby Julich climbed from 12th to 1st overall.

== Stages ==
=== 03-08-2005: Mechelen, 5.7 km. (ITT) ===
	Cyclist	Team	Time
1	Rik Verbrugghe	Quick Step	6' 45"
2	Carlos Barredo	Liberty Seguros	+ 1"
3	Servais Knaven	Quick Step	+ 2"

=== 04-08-2005: Geel-Mierlo, 189 km. ===
	Cyclist	Team	Time
1	Max van Heeswijk	Discovery Channel	4h 20' 08"
2	Marco Zanotti	Liquigas	s.t.
3	Steven de Jongh	Rabobank	s.t.

=== 05-08-2005: Geldrop-Sittard, 178 km. ===
	Cyclist	Team	Time
1	Simone Cadamuro	Domina Vacanze	4h 14' 48"
2	Marco Zanotti	Liquigas	s.t.
3	Enrico Gasparotto	Liquigas	s.t.

=== 06-08-2005: Beek-Landgraaf, 205 km. ===
	Cyclist	Team	Time
1	Allan Davis	Liberty Seguros	4h 56' 44"
2	Erik Dekker	Rabobank	+ 5"
3	Daniele Bennati	Lampre-Caffita	+ 5"

=== 07-08-2005: Landgraaf-Verviers, 232 km. ===
	Cyclist	Team	Time
1	Alessandro Ballan	Lampre-Caffita	6h 06' 05"
2	Rik Verbrugghe	Quick Step	s.t.
3	Leif Hoste	Discovery Channel	s.t.

=== 08-08-2005: Verviers-Hasselt, 194 km. ===
	Cyclist	Team	Time
1	Max van Heeswijk	Discovery Channel	4h 41' 06"
2	Alberto Ongarato	Fassa Bortolo	s.t.
3	Stefan van Dijk	Mr Bookmaker	s.t.

=== 09-08-2005: Sint Truiden-Hoogstraten, 195 km. ===
	Cyclist	Team	Time
1	Stefan van Dijk	Mr Bookmaker	4h 10' 37"
2	Max van Heeswijk	Discovery Channel	s.t.
3	Simone Cadamuro	Domina Vacanze	s.t.

=== 10-08-2005: Etten-Leur, 26 km. (ITT) ===
	Cyclist	Team	Time
1	Bobby Julich	Team CSC	31' 14"
2	Leif Hoste	Discovery Channel	+ 21"
3	Erik Dekker	Rabobank	+ 45"

== General Standings ==
	Cyclist	Team	Time
1	Bobby Julich	Team CSC	29h 08' 01"
2	Erik Dekker	Rabobank	+ 21"
3	Leif Hoste	Discovery Channel	+ 41"
4	Thomas Dekker	Rabobank	+ 54"
5	Michael Blaudzun	Team CSC	+ 1' 07"
6	Rik Verbrugghe	Quick-Step–Innergetic	+ 1' 16"
7	Carlos Barredo	Liberty Seguros–Würth	+ 1' 22"
8	Jurgen van den Broeck	Discovery Channel	+ 1' 28"
9	Andreas Klier	T-Mobile Team	+ 1' 57"
10	Sergei Ivanov	T-Mobile Team	+ 2' 12"

== KOM Classification ==
	Cyclist	Team
1	Christian Vandevelde	Team CSC

== Points Classification ==
	Cyclist	Team
1	Allan Davis	Liberty Seguros

== Best Young Rider ==
	Cyclist	Team
1	Thomas Dekker	Rabobank

== Best Team ==
	Team	Country
1	Team CSC	Denmark
