= David Kopp =

German cyclist (born 1979)

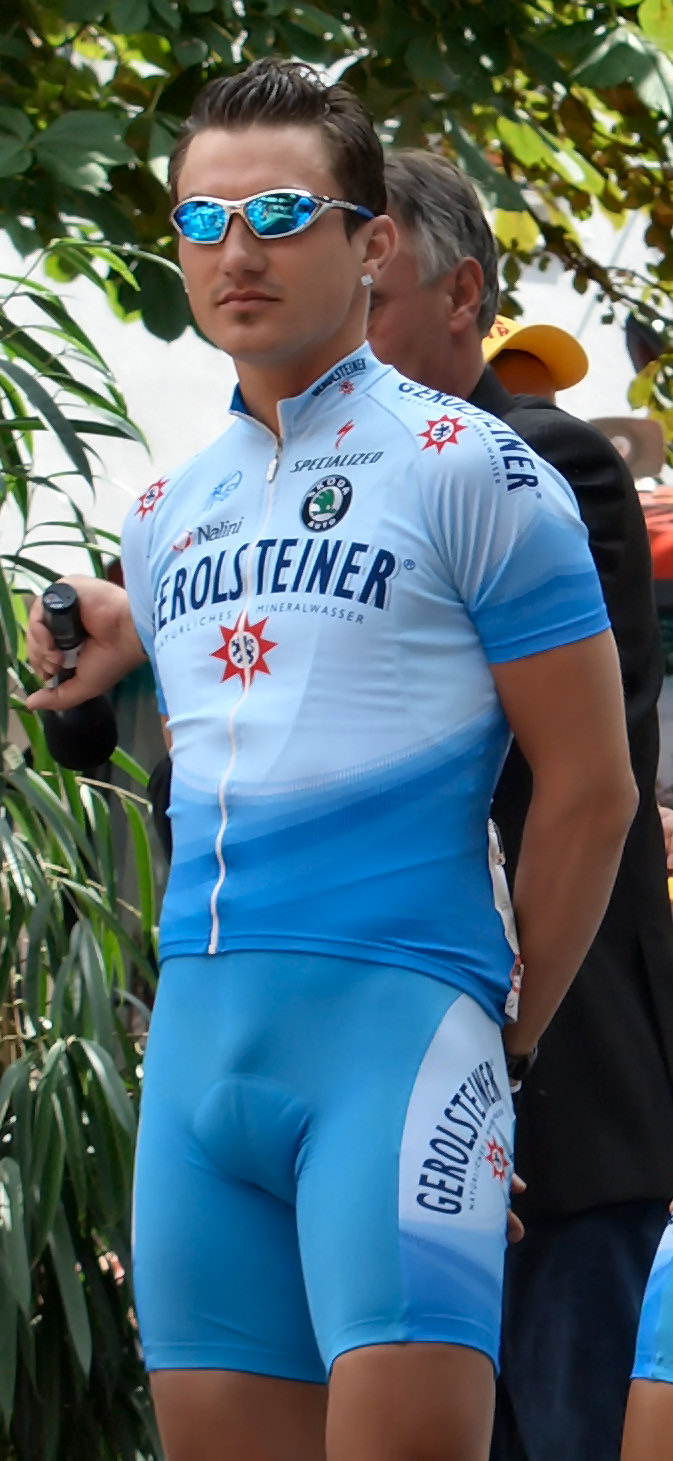

Personal information
- Full name: David Kopp
- Born: 5 January 1979 (age 47) Bonn, West Germany

Cycling career
- Sport: Cycling
- Discipline: Road
- Role: Rider

Amateur team
- 2000: Telekom Junior Team

Professional teams
- 2001–2003: Team Telekom
- 2004: Team Lamonta
- 2005: Team Wiesenhof
- 2006–2007: Gerolsteiner
- 2008: Cycle Collstrop
- 2010–2011: Team Kuota–Indeland

David Kopp (born 5 January 1979, in Bonn) is a former German road racing cyclist, who competed as a professional between 2001 and 2011. Kopp's speciality was sprinting and the cobbled classics of Belgium.

Kopp started his pro career with Team Telekom in 2001 before moving to smaller German teams for 2004 and 2005. In 2006, he returned to top level cycling with Gerolsteiner for two years before moving to Pro Continental team Cycle Collstrop in 2008. He did not get a contract for 2009.

In March 2009, it was announced that he tested positive for Cocaine during a National event in Belgium on 11 September 2008.

In February 2010, it was announced that Kopp will ride for the Team Kuota–Indeland on a one-year contract for 2010.

He now (2016) works in the fuel retail industry.

== Major results ==
1997
1st Road race, National Junior Road Championships
2001
1st Rund um den Henninger Turm Under-23
FBD Insurance Rás

1st Stages 3 & 8

1st Stage 3 Circuito Montañés
2004 (2 pro wins)
1st Rund um Düren
1st Sparkassen Giro
1st Grote Prijs Stad Zottegem
1st Stage 2 Giro del Capo
2005 (2)
1st Rund um Köln
1st Mountains classification, Tour de Luxembourg
1st Stage 1 Giro del Capo
1st Stage 3 Bayern Rundfahrt
4th E3 Prijs Vlaanderen
2006 (2)
1st Trofeo Calvià
1st Stage 6 Tour of Benelux
2nd Gent–Wevelgem
2nd Rund um Köln
2007 (1)
1st Stage 3 Tour de Pologne
5th Dwars door Vlaanderen
10th Brabantse Pijl
2008
2nd E3 Prijs Vlaanderen
