= 2008 Bayern Rundfahrt =

Race details
- Dates: 28 May–1 June 2008
- Stages: 5
- Distance: 771.9 km (479.6 mi)
- Winning time: 18h 18' 28"

Results
	Winner	Christian Knees (GER)
	Second	Andreas Dietziker (SUI)
	Third	Niki Terpstra (NED)

The 2008 Bayern Rundfahrt was the 29th edition of the Bayern Rundfahrt cycle race and was held on 28 May to 1 June 2008. The race started in Freyung and finished in Erlangen. The race was won by Christian Knees.

== General classification ==
Final general classification

Rank	Rider	Time
1	Christian Knees (GER)	18h 18' 28"
2	Andreas Dietziker (SUI)	+ 3"
3	Niki Terpstra (NED)	+ 6"
4	Kim Kirchen (LUX)	+ 14"
5	Gerald Ciolek (GER)	+ 34"
6	Bernhard Kohl (AUT)	+ 41"
7	Lars Bak (DEN)	+ 49"
8	Markus Fothen (GER)	+ 50"
9	Björn Glasner (GER)	+ 50"
10	Stef Clement (NED)	+ 53"
