= Joost Posthuma =

Dutch cyclist

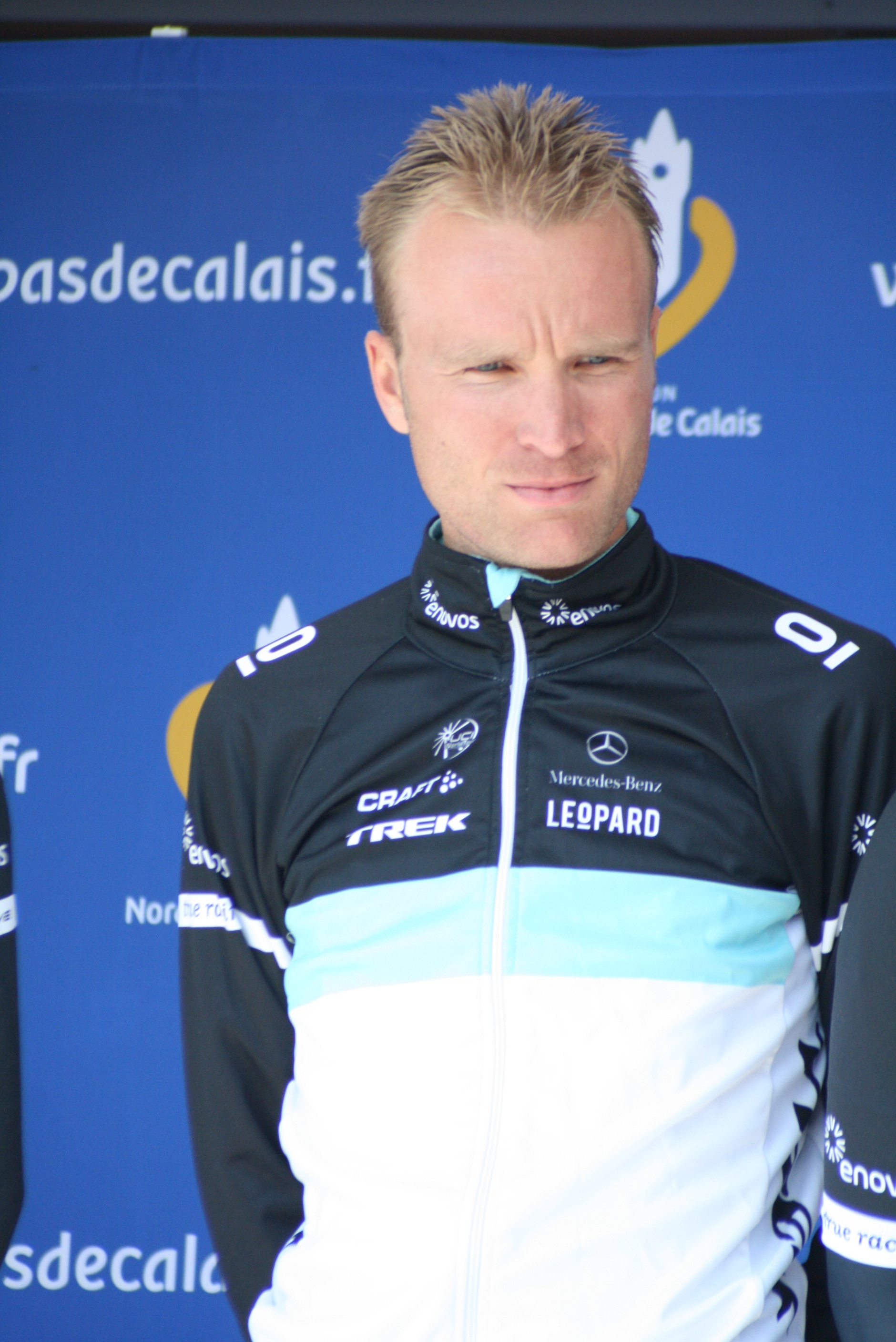
- Posthuma at the 2011 Four Days of Dunkirk.

Personal information
- Full name: Joost Posthuma
- Born: March 8, 1981 (age 45) Hengelo, the Netherlands
- Height: 1.89 m (6 ft 2 in)
- Weight: 76 kg (168 lb)

Cycling career
- Sport: Cycling
- Discipline: Road
- Role: Rider

Amateur teams
- 2001: Giant–Löwik
- 2002–2004: Rabobank Beloften

Professional teams
- 2004–2010: Rabobank
- 2011–2012: Leopard Trek

Major wins
- Stage races Three Days of De Panne (2008) Tour de Luxembourg (2008)

Joost Posthuma (born 8 March 1981) is a Dutch retired professional road bicycle racer, who competed as a professional between 2004 and 2012. Born in Hengelo, Posthuma was known for his time-trialling and he wore the white jersey for the best young rider at the 2006 Tour de France. Posthuma set the best time for riders eligible for the young rider classification in the prologue, but lost it after the 1st road stage, after a rival got in a breakaway and got bonus seconds on the road.

== Major results ==
2003
1st Overall Olympia's Tour
1st Overall Thüringen Rundfahrt der U23
1st Prologue Tour de Normandie
2004
1st Overall Circuit des Mines

1st Stage 8

2005
1st Grote Prijs Jef Scherens
1st Stage 4 Paris–Nice
2006
1st Ridderronde Maastricht
6th Overall Eneco Tour
Tour de France

Held after Prologue

2007
1st Overall Sachsen Tour

1st Stage 4 (ITT)

2nd Overall Three Days of De Panne
2008
1st Overall Three Days of De Panne

1st Stage 3b (ITT)

1st Overall Tour of Luxembourg
2009
1st Overall Vuelta a Andalucía
2010
1st Stage 7 (ITT) Tour of Austria
2011
9th Overall Tour of Britain
2012
8th Overall Bayern–Rundfahrt

=== Grand Tour general classification results timeline ===
Grand Tour general classification results
| Grand Tour | 2004 | 2005 | 2006 | 2007 | 2008 | 2009 | 2010 | 2011 |
| Giro d'Italia | Did not Contest | | | | | | | |
| Tour de France | — | 83 | 83 | — | 67 | 73 | — | 108 |
| Vuelta a España | 92 | — | — | 55 | — | — | — | — |

Legend
| — | Did not compete |
| DNF | Did not finish |
