= List of wins by Termolan and its successors =

This is a comprehensive list of victories of the VF Group–Bardiani–CSF–Faizanè cycling team. The races are categorised according to the UCI Continental Circuits rules.

== 1982 – Termolan ==
No recorded wins

== 1983 – Termolan ==
No recorded wins

== 1984 – Santini ==
No recorded wins

== 1985 – Santini ==
Milano–Torino, Daniele Caroli
Giro di Campania, Daniele Caroli
Stage 1 Giro di Puglia, Daniele Caroli
Gorla Minore Cyclo-cross, Claudio Fasolo

== 1986 – Santini ==
Stage 5b Settimana Siciliana, Jesper Worre
Overall Tour of Denmark, Jesper Worre

== 1987 – Selca ==
Young rider classification Giro d'Italia, Roberto Conti

== 1988 – Selca ==
Stage 17 Giro d'Italia, Patrizio Gambirasio

== 1989 – Selca ==
No recorded wins

== 1990 – Italbonifica–Navigare ==
Stage 6 Settimana Siciliana, William Dazzani
Stage 3 Giro di Puglia, Michele Moro
Stages 4a & 8 Giro d'Italia, Stefano Allocchio

== 1991 – Italbonifica–Navigare ==
Stage 2 Settimana Ciclistica Lombarda, Sergio Carcano

== 1992 – Italbonifica–Navigare ==
Coppa Sabatini, Stefano Zanini

== 1993 – Navigare–Blue Storm ==
Stage 3 Settimana Ciclistica Lombarda, Roberto Pagnin
Stages 4 & 6 Settimana Ciclistica Lombarda, Fabiano Fontanelli
Stage 7 Settimana Ciclistica Lombarda, Fabrizio Settembrini
Stage 11 Giro d'Italia, Fabiano Fontanelli
Italy National Road Race Championship, Massimo Podenzana
Stage 5 Tour de Pologne, Fabiano Fontanelli
Stage 7 Tour de Pologne, Walter Castignola

== 1994 – Navigare–Blue Storm ==
Giro dell'Etna, Stefano Zanini
Stage 5 Tirreno–Adriatico, Stefano Zanini
Stage 8 Tirreno–Adriatico, Roberto Pagnin
Stage 22 Giro d'Italia, Stefano Zanini
Italy National Road Race Championship, Massimo Podenzana
Stage 3 Tour de Pologne, Walter Castignola

== 1995 – Navigare–Blue Storm ==
Stages 1 & 6 Settimana Ciclistica Lombarda, Giuseppe Guerini
Stage 10 Tour DuPont, Vassili Davidenko

== 1996 – Scrigno–Blue Storm ==
Stages 2, 4 & 5 Regio-Tour, Filippo Casagrande
Gran Premio di Lugano, Amilcare Tronca
Tre Valli Varesine, Fabrizio Guidi
Overall Danmark Rundt, Fabrizio Guidi

Stage 3, Fabrizio Guidi

Grand Prix of Aargau Canton, Fabrizio Guidi
Gran Premio Industria e Commercio di Prato, Fabrizio Guidi
Gran Premio della Costa Etruschi, Fabrizio Guidi
Points classification in the Giro d'Italia, Fabrizio Guidi
Stage 3 Tour de Suisse, Cristian Gasperoni
Stages 1 & 14 Vuelta a España, Biagio Conte

== 1997 – Scrigno–Gaerne ==
Gran Premio Industria e Commercio Artigianato Carnaghese, Francesco Secchiari
Stage 4a Euskal Bizikleta, Fabrizio Guidi
Stage 3a Driedaagse van De Panne, Fabrizio Guidi
Gran Premio della Costa Etruschi, Biagio Conte
Stage 2 Tirreno–Adriatico, Davide Casarotto
Coppa Ugo Agostoni, Massimo Apollonio

== 1998 – Scrigno–Gaerne ==
Stages 4 & 9 Tour de Langkawi, Mirko Rossato
Stage 6 Tour de Langkawi, Alessandro Petacchi
Stage 8 Tour de Langkawi, Dario Pieri
Stage 12 Tour de Langkawi, Luca Cei
Stage 1 Tirreno–Adriatico, Gabriele Balducci
Stage 1 Driedaagse van De Panne, Dario Pieri
Stage 6 Tour de Suisse, Vladimir Duma
Ukraine Road Race Championships, Vladimir Duma
Stage 7 Tour of Austria, Mirko Rossato
Giro di Toscana, Francesco Secchiari

== 1999 – Navigare–Gaerne ==
Stages 2 & 7 Tour de Langkawi, Enrico Degano
Stage 12 Tour de Langkawi, Luca Cei
Giro del Lago Maggiore, Gabriele Balducci
Stage 1 Tour of Slovenia, Gabriele Balducci
Stage 3 Tour of Slovenia, Enrico Degano
Stage 4 Tour of Slovenia, Dario Pieri
Stage 5 Giro d'Abruzzo, Vladimir Duma

== 2000 – Ceramica Panaria–Gaerne ==
Stage 10 Tour de Langkawi, Julio Alberto Pérez
Stage 3 Settimana Internazionale di Coppi e Bartali, Enrico Degano
Stage 2 Giro d'Abruzzo, Vladimir Duma
Stage 2 GP Jornal de Noticias, Enrico Degano
Stage 6 Tour of Austria, Gerrit Glomser
Stage 4 Tour of Sweden, Nathan O'Neill
Ukraine Road Race Championships, Vladimir Duma
Trofeo Matteotti, Yauheni Seniushkin
Trofeo dello Scalatore II, Julio Alberto Pérez

== 2001 – Ceramiche Panaria–Fiordo ==
Stages 2 & 5 Tour de Langkawi, Enrico Degano
Stage 10 Tour de Langkawi, Nathan O'Neill
Stage 1 Circuit des Mines, Sergiy Matveyev
Stage 13 Giro d'Italia, Julio Alberto Pérez
Giro del Veneto, Giuliano Figueras

== 2002 – Ceramiche Panaria–Fiordo ==
Australia Time Trial Championships, Nathan O'Neill
Stage 3 Tour de Langkawi, Enrico Degano
Stages 6 & 10 Tour de Langkawi, Graeme Brown
Stage 3a Circuit des Mines, Sergiy Matveyev
Giro dell'Appennino, Giuliano Figueras
Stages 13 & 16 Giro d'Italia, Julio Alberto Pérez
Gran Premio Industria e Commercio di Prato, Vladimir Duma

== 2003 – Ceramiche Panaria–Fiordo ==
Stage 6 Tour Down Under, Graeme Brown
Stages 5 & 7 Tour de Langkawi, Graeme Brown
Stage 10 Tour de Langkawi, Guillermo Bongiorno
Gran Premio di Chiasso, Giuliano Figueras
Stage 4 Settimana Internazionale di Coppi e Bartali, Luca Mazzanti
Overall Settimana Lombarda, Julio Alberto Pérez

Stage 2, Julio Alberto Pérez

Ukraine Time Trial Championships, Sergiy Matveyev
Casalincontrada-Blockhaus, Claudio Bartoli

== 2004 – Ceramiche Panaria–Margres ==
Stage 3 Tour de Langkawi, Brett Lancaster
Stage 10 Tour de Langkawi, Guillermo Bongiorno
Overall Settimana Internazionale di Coppi e Bartali, Giuliano Figueras
Stage 11 Giro d'Italia, Emanuele Sella
Stage 2a Brixia Tour, Julio Alberto Pérez
Trofeo Città di Castelfidardo, Emanuele Sella
Firenze–Pistoia, Sergiy Matveyev
3rd Stage 6 Giro d'Italia, Alejandro Borrajo

== 2005 – Ceramica Panaria–Navigare ==
Stages 1, 5, 7, 9 & 10, Tour de Langkawi, Graeme Brown
Stages 2 & 6, Guillermo Bongiorno
Stage 1a Settimana Internazionale di Coppi e Bartali, Guillermo Bongiorno
Giro della Provincia di Reggio Calabria, Guillermo Bongiorno
Stage 1 Settimana Lombarda, Guillermo Bongiorno
Stage 4 Settimana Lombarda, Fredy González
Giro d'Oro, Luca Mazzanti
Overall Giro del Trentino, Julio Alberto Pérez
Stage 5 Circuit de Lorraine, Paride Grillo
GP Industria & Artigianato, Luca Mazzanti
Prologue (ITT) Giro d'Italia, Brett Lancaster
Stage 4 Giro d'Italia, Luca Mazzanti
Overall Brixia Tour, Emanuele Sella

Stage 2a, Guillermo Bongiorno
Stage 2b, Emanuele Sella

Stage 4 Tour of Denmark, Paride Grillo
Gran Premio Fred Mengoni, Luca Mazzanti
Stage 1 Regio-Tour, Guillermo Bongiorno
Gran Premio Città di Misano – Adriatico, Guillermo Bongiorno
Firenze–Pistoia, Sergiy Matveyev

== 2006 – Ceramica Panaria–Navigare ==
Stage 1 Tour de Langkawi, Maximiliano Richeze
Stage 2 Tour de Langkawi, Guillermo Bongiorno
Stage 9 Tour de Langkawi, Sergiy Matveyev
Grand Prix de Rennes, Paride Grillo
Stage 2 Circuit de la Sarthe, Paride Grillo
Stage 1 Giro del Trentino, Luca Mazzanti
Stage 14 Giro d'Italia, Luis Felipe Laverde
Subida al Naranco, Fortunato Baliani
Stage 4 Brixia Tour, Paride Grillo
Stage 1 Tour de Wallonie, Aitor Galdós
Stage 1 Tour of Denmark, Aitor Galdós

== 2007 – Ceramica Panaria–Navigare ==
Stage 2 Tour de Langkawi, Maximiliano Richeze
Gran Premio di Lugano, Luca Mazzanti
Grand Prix de Rennes, Sergiy Matveyev
Stage 2 Circuit de la Sarthe, Paride Grillo
Stage 4 Giro del Trentino, Maximiliano Richeze
Stage 6 Giro d'Italia, Luis Felipe Laverde
Stage 2 Circuit de Lorraine, Matteo Priamo
Stage 1 Tour de Luxembourg, Maximiliano Richeze
Stage 2b Brixia Tour, Emanuele Sella
Stages 1 & 7 Volta a Portugal, Paride Grillo
Gran Premio Città di Camaiore, Fortunato Baliani
Gran Premio Nobili Rubinetterie, Luis Felipe Laverde

== 2008 – CSF Group–Navigare ==
Stage 2 Tour de San Luis, Maximiliano Richeze
Stage 8 Tour de Langkawi, Filippo Savini
Stage 9 Tour de Langkawi, Mauro Richeze
Stage 5 Settimana Internazionale di Coppi e Bartali, Emanuele Sella
Stage 5 Circuit de la Sarthe, Maximiliano Richeze
Stage 1 Presidential Cycling Tour of Turkey, Guillermo Bongiorno
Stages 3 & 5 Presidential Cycling Tour of Turkey, Matteo Priamo
Stage 4 Presidential Cycling Tour of Turkey, Filippo Savini
Stages 6 & 7 Presidential Cycling Tour of Turkey, Maximiliano Richeze
Stage 6 Giro d'Italia, Matteo Priamo
Stages 14, 15 & 20 Giro d'Italia, Emanuele Sella
Mountains classification in the Giro d'Italia, Emanuele Sella
Team classification Giro d'Italia
Stages 1 & 4 Tour of Denmark, Guillermo Bongiorno

== 2009 – CSF Group–Navigare ==
Stage 2 Giro della Provincia di Grosseto, Marco Frapporti
Stages 1 & 6 Presidential Cycling Tour of Turkey, Mauro Finetto
Stage 5 Settimana Ciclistica Lombarda, Domenico Pozzovivo
Hel van het Mergelland, Mauro Finetto
Giro della Provincia di Reggio Calabria, Fortunato Baliani

== 2010 – Colnago–CSF Inox ==
Stage 2 Settimana Lombarda, Mattia Gavazzi
Stage 4 Giro del Trentino, Domenico Pozzovivo
Stage 13 Giro d'Italia, Manuel Belletti
Gran Premio Nobili Rubinetterie, Gianluca Brambilla
Overall Brixia Tour, Domenico Pozzovivo

Stages 2 & 4, Domenico Pozzovivo

Coppa Bernocchi, Manuel Belletti
Stage 5 Tour of Britain, Marco Frapporti

== 2011 – Colnago–CSF Inox ==
Stage 3 Giro della Provincia di Reggio Calabria, Manuel Belletti
Stage 1 Settimana Internazionale di Coppi e Bartali, Manuel Belletti
Stage 3 Vuelta a Castilla y León, Filippo Savini
Stage 3 Presidential Cycling Tour of Turkey, Manuel Belletti
Stages 5 & 9 Tour of Qinghai Lake, Sacha Modolo
Stage 1 Brixia Tour, Marco Frapporti
Stage 3 Brixia Tour, Manuel Belletti
Stage 4 Brixia Tour, Domenico Pozzovivo
Stage 5 Brixia Tour, Sacha Modolo
Stages 1 & 4 Danmark Rundt, Sacha Modolo
Coppa Ugo Agostoni, Sacha Modolo
Stages 2 & 3 Settimana Lombarda, Sacha Modolo
Stages 1 & 3 Giro di Padania, Sacha Modolo

== 2012 – Colnago–CSF Bardiani ==
Stage 7 Tour de Langkawi, Marco Canola
Overall Giro del Trentino, Domenico Pozzovivo

Stage 3, Domenico Pozzovivo

Stage 5 Tour of Turkey, Andrea Di Corrado
Stage 6 Tour of Turkey, Sacha Modolo
Stage 8 Giro d'Italia, Domenico Pozzovivo
Stage 3 Tour of Slovenia, Domenico Pozzovivo
Stages 3 & 6 Tour of Austria, Sacha Modolo
Coppa Bernocchi, Sacha Modolo
Stage 1b Monviso-Venezia — Il Padania, Team time trial
Stage 2 Monviso-Venezia — Il Padania, Sacha Modolo

== 2013 – Bardiani Valvole–CSF Inox ==
Stage 2 Tour de San Luis, Sacha Modolo
Stage 4 Giro d'Italia, Enrico Battaglin
Mountains classification in the Giro d'Italia, Stefano Pirazzi
Stages 1, 4, 8, 9, 11 & 12 Tour of Qinghai Lake, Sacha Modolo
Stage 2 Tour du Limousin, Andrea Pasqualon
Coppa Bernocchi, Sacha Modolo
Memorial Marco Pantani, Sacha Modolo

== 2014 – Bardiani–CSF ==
Stage 2 Giro del Trentino, Edoardo Zardini
Stage 13 Giro d'Italia, Marco Canola
Stage 14 Giro d'Italia, Enrico Battaglin
Stage 17 Giro d'Italia, Stefano Pirazzi
Stage 2 Tour of Slovenia, Sonny Colbrelli
Stage 3 Tour of Slovenia, Francesco Bongiorno
Giro dell'Appennino, Sonny Colbrelli
Stage 6 Danmark Rundt, Nicola Boem
Stage 3 Tour du Poitou-Charentes, Nicola Ruffoni
Stage 3 Tour of Britain, Edoardo Zardini
Memorial Marco Pantani, Sonny Colbrelli
Coppa Sabatini, Sonny Colbrelli

== 2015 – Bardiani–CSF ==
Stage 10 Giro d'Italia, Nicola Boem
Overall Tour du Limousin, Sonny Colbrelli

Stage 1, Sonny Colbrelli

Gran Premio Bruno Beghelli, Sonny Colbrelli

== 2016 – Bardiani–CSF ==
Gran Premio di Lugano, Sonny Colbrelli
Stage 4 Settimana Internazionale di Coppi e Bartali, Stefano Pirazzi
Stage 10 Giro d'Italia, Giulio Ciccone
Stages 1 & 6 Tour of Austria, Nicola Ruffoni
Stage 5 Tour of Austria, Simone Sterbini
Stage 5 Tour du Poitou-Charentes, Sonny Colbrelli
Stages 3 & 4 Tour du Limousin, Sonny Colbrelli
Coppa Ugo Agostoni, Sonny Colbrelli
Coppa Sabatini, Sonny Colbrelli
Gran Premio Bruno Beghelli, Nicola Ruffoni

== 2017 – Bardiani–CSF ==
Stage 6 Tour de Langkawi, Enrico Barbin
Stage 6 Tour of Utah, Giulio Ciccone

== 2018 – Bardiani–CSF ==
Overall International Tour of Rhodes, Mirco Maestri

Stage 1, Mirco Maestri

Stages 1 & 8 Le Tour de Langkawi, Andrea Guardini
Stage 4 Tour of Croatia, Alessandro Tonelli
Stage 6 Tour of Croatia, Paolo Simion
Giro dell'Appennino, Giulio Ciccone
Stage 2 Tour du Limousin, Luca Wackermann

== 2019 – Bardiani–CSF ==
Stage 3 Istrian Spring Trophy, Andrea Guardini
Stage 10 Tour of Qinghai Lake, Andrea Guardini
Stage 2 Tour of China I, Mirco Maestri

== 2020 – Bardiani–CSF ==
Stage 2 Tour of Antalya, Giovanni Lonardi

== 2021 – Bardiani–CSF–Faizanè ==
Grand Prix Alanya, Davide Gabburo
Poreč Trophy, Filippo Fiorelli
Stage 2 Istrian Spring Trophy, Filippo Zana
GP Slovenian Istria, Mirco Maestri
GP Slovenia, Mirco Maestri
Stage 1 Tour of Bulgaria, Giovanni Lonardi
Overall Czech Cycling Tour, Filippo Zana

== 2022 – Bardiani–CSF–Faizanè ==
Grand Prix Alanya, Alessio Martinelli
Trofeo Piva, Alessio Martinelli
Stage 4 (ITT) Carpathian Couriers Race, Alessio Martinelli
Gran Premio Industrie del Marmo, Alessio Martinelli
Overall Adriatica Ionica Race, Filippo Zana
Italy Road Race Championships, Filippo Zana
Stage 1 Sibiu Cycling Tour, Filippo Fiorelli

== 2023 – Green Project–Bardiani CSF–Faizanè ==
Overall Tour du Rwanda, Henok Mulubrhan

Stages 3 & 8, Henok Mulubrhan
Stage 7, Manuele Tarozzi

Stage 5 Tour de Taiwan, Enrico Zanoncello
Stage 2 Belgrade–Banja Luka, Enrico Zanoncello
Coppa della Pace, Matteo Scalco
Giro del Medio Brenta, Giulio Pellizzari
Overall Tour of Qinghai Lake, Henok Mulubrhan

Stage 5, Enrico Zanoncello
Stage 7, Henok Mulubrhan

Muur Classic Geraardsbergen, Filippo Magli
Stage 1 Tour of Taihu Lake, Enrico Zanoncello

== 2024 – VF Group–Bardiani–CSF–Faizanè ==
Stage 1 Volta a la Comunitat Valenciana, Alessandro Tonelli
Stage 1 Istrian Spring Trophy, Mattia Pinazzi
GP Palio del Recioto, Alessandro Pinarello
Stage 1 Giro d'Abruzzo, Enrico Zanoncello
Stage 3 Tour of Qinghai Lake, Manuele Tarozzi

== Supplementary statistics ==
=== 1982 to 2002 ===
Grand Tours by highest finishing position
Race	1982	1983	1984	1985	1986	1987	1988	1989	1990	1991	1992	1993	1994	1995	1996	1997	1998	1999	2000	2001	2002
Giro d'Italia	27	27	35	13	15	15	33	12	37	24	59	53	7	31	8	83	24	6	38	10	19
Tour de France	–	–	–	27	–	–	–	–	–	–	–	–	–	–	–	–	–	–	–	–	–
Vuelta a España	–	–	–	–	–	–	–	–	–	–	–	74	29	–	–	61	–	–	–	29	–
Major week-long stage races by highest finishing position
Race	1982	1983	1984	1985	1986	1987	1988	1989	1990	1991	1992	1993	1994	1995	1996	1997	1998	1999	2000	2001	2002
Tour Down Under	Did not Exist																	–	–	–	–
Paris–Nice	–	–	–	–	–	–	–	–	–	–	–	–	–	–	–	–	–	–	–	–	–
Tirreno–Adriatico	–	–	–	12	–	6	–	–	–	46	24	10	10	5	8	5	11	–	32	11	12
Volta a Catalunya	–	–	–	–	–	–	–	–	–	–	–	–	–	–	–	–	–	–	–	–	–
Tour of the Basque Country	–	–	–	–	–	–	–	–	–	–	–	–	–	–	–	–	–	–	–	–	–
Giro del Trentino	–	11	4	11	–	–	7	–	16	–	9	–	21	14	–	–	25	14	2	28	2
Tour de Romandie	–	–	–	–	–	–	–	–	–	–	–	–	–	–	18	–	–	–	–	–	–
Critérium du Dauphiné	–	–	–	–	–	–	–	–	–	–	–	–	–	–	–	–	–	–	–	–	–
Tour de Suisse	–	–	–	–	–	–	–	–	–	–	–	–	–	–	11	33	–	–	–	–	–
Tour de Pologne	–	–	–	–	–	–	–	–	–	–	–	–	–	2	4	–	14	–	–	–	–
Ronde van Nederland	–	–	–	–	–	–	–	–	–	–	–	–	–	–	–	–	–	–	–	–	–
Monument races by highest finishing position
Race	1982	1983	1984	1985	1986	1987	1988	1989	1990	1991	1992	1993	1994	1995	1996	1997	1998	1999	2000	2001	2002
Milan–San Remo	77	82	42	27	52	107	52	68	10	58	15	38	4	34	43	3	6	10	–	28	49
Tour of Flanders	–	–	–	–	–	–	–	–	–	–	–	–	–	–	–	5	–	–	–	–	–
Paris–Roubaix	–	–	–	–	–	–	–	–	–	–	–	–	–	–	–	5	16	–	–	–	–
Liège–Bastogne–Liège	–	–	–	–	–	–	–	–	–	–	–	–	–	–	–	111	–	–	–	–	–
Giro di Lombardia	–	–	–	–	–	14	20	43	60	–	–	17	46	17	–	–	–	–	3	2	27
Classics by highest finishing position
Classic	1982	1983	1984	1985	1986	1987	1988	1989	1990	1991	1992	1993	1994	1995	1996	1997	1998	1999	2000	2001	2002
Omloop Het Volk	–	–	–	–	NH	–	–	–	–	–	–	–	–	–	–	–	–	–	–	–	–
Kuurne–Brussels–Kuurne	–	–	–	–	NH	–	–	–	–	–	–	NH	–	–	–	–	–	–	–	–	–
E3 Harelbeke	–	–	–	–	–	–	–	–	–	–	–	–	–	–	–	–	7	8	–	–	–
Gent–Wevelgem	–	–	–	–	–	–	–	–	–	–	–	–	38	–	31	8	13	–	–	–	–
Amstel Gold Race	–	–	–	–	–	–	–	–	–	–	–	–	–	–	–	15	–	–	–	–	–
La Flèche Wallonne	–	72	–	–	–	–	–	–	–	–	–	–	–	–	–	–	–	–	–	–	–
Clásica de San Sebastián	–	–	–	–	–	–	–	–	–	–	–	–	–	–	–	–	–	–	–	–	–
Paris–Tours	–	–	–	–	–	–	–	–	–	–	–	–	–	–	–	6	34	–	–	–	–

=== 2003 to 2023 ===
Grand Tours by highest finishing position
Race	2003	2004	2005	2006	2007	2008	2009	2010	2011	2012	2013	2014	2015	2016	2017	2018	2019	2020	2021	2022	2023
Giro d'Italia	20	12	10	20	11	6	–	73	61	8	44	52	22	18	95	40	57	51	35	24	42
Tour de France	–	–	–	–	–	–	–	–	–	–	–	–	–	–	–	–	–	–	–	–	–
Vuelta a España	–	–	–	–	–	–	–	–	–	–	–	–	–	–	–	–	–	–	–	–	–
Major week-long stage races by highest finishing position
Race	2003	2004	2005	2006	2007	2008	2009	2010	2011	2012	2013	2014	2015	2016	2017	2018	2019	2020	2021	2022	2023
Tour Down Under	–	7	–	–	–	–	–	–	–	–	–	–	–	–	–	–	–	–	NH		–
Paris–Nice	–	–	–	–	–	–	–	–	–	–	–	–	–	–	–	–	–	–	–	–	–
Tirreno–Adriatico	27	8	13	34	21	19	–	7	–	11	–	28	77	62	107	–	90	68	–	51	47
Volta a Catalunya	–	–	–	–	–	–	–	–	–	–	–	–	–	–	–	–	–	NH	–	–	–
Tour of the Basque Country	–	–	–	–	–	–	–	–	–	–	–	–	–	–	–	–	–	NH	–	–	–
Tour of the Alps	5	4	1	2	3	3	5	3	4	1	7	14	10	12	51	9	22	NH	21	49	17
Tour de Romandie	–	–	–	–	–	–	–	–	–	–	–	–	–	–	–	–	–	NH	–	–	–
Critérium du Dauphiné	–	–	–	–	–	–	–	–	–	–	–	–	–	–	–	–	–	–	–	–	–
Tour de Suisse	–	–	–	–	–	–	–	–	–	–	–	–	–	–	–	–	–	NH	–	–	–
Tour de Pologne	–	–	–	–	–	–	–	–	–	–	–	–	–	13	–	–	–	–	–	–	–
BinckBank Tour	–	–	–	–	–	–	–	–	–	–	–	–	–	–	–	–	–	–	–	NH (Note: The Organisers cancelled the 2022 edition due to an "overcrowded" calendar.)	–
Monument races by highest finishing position
Race	2003	2004	2005	2006	2007	2008	2009	2010	2011	2012	2013	2014	2015	2016	2017	2018	2019	2020	2021	2022	2023
Milan–San Remo	39	49	25	47	45	22	–	4	29	44	12	6	18	9	106	66	90	94	48	29	64
Tour of Flanders	–	–	–	–	–	–	–	–	–	–	–	–	–	–	–	–	–	–	–	–	–
Paris–Roubaix	–	–	–	–	–	–	–	–	–	–	–	–	–	–	–	–	–	NH	–	–	–
Liège–Bastogne–Liège	–	–	–	–	–	–	–	–	–	–	–	–	–	–	–	–	–	–	–	–	–
Il Lombardia	54	10	14	10	7	6	–	DNF	6	DNF	–	32	22	51	49	41	63	50	49	75	53
Classics by highest finishing position
Classic	2003	2004	2005	2006	2007	2008	2009	2010	2011	2012	2013	2014	2015	2016	2017	2018	2019	2020	2021	2022	2023
Omloop Het Nieuwsblad	–	NH	–	–	–	–	–	–	–	–	–	–	–	–	–	–	–	–	–	–	–
Kuurne–Brussels–Kuurne	–	–	–	–	–	–	–	–	–	–	NH	–	–	–	–	–	–	–	–	–	–
Strade Bianche	Did not Exist				20	36	–	–	DNF	38	38	22	56	32	69	–	–	DNF	38	19	62
E3 Harelbeke	–	–	–	–	–	–	–	–	–	–	–	–	–	–	–	–	–	NH	–	82	–
Gent–Wevelgem	–	–	–	–	–	–	–	–	–	–	–	–	–	52	–	–	–	–	–	73	–
Amstel Gold Race	–	–	–	–	–	–	–	–	–	–	–	32	107	3	73	–	111	NH	–	93	–
La Flèche Wallonne	–	–	–	–	–	–	–	–	–	–	–	–	–	–	–	–	–	–	–	–	–
Clásica de San Sebastián	–	–	–	–	–	–	–	–	–	–	–	–	–	–	–	–	–	NH	–	–	–

Legend
—	Did not compete
DNF	Did not finish
NH	Not held
