= List of wins by Colnago–Lampre and its successors =

This is a list of victories of the UAE Team Emirates XRG cycling team.

== 1999 Lampre–Daikin ==
Criterium Aalst, Ludo Dierckxsens
Clásica de Almería, Ján Svorada
Stage 3 Vuelta Ciclista a Murcia, Ján Svorada
Stage 8 Tirreno – Adriatico, Ján Svorada
Stage 7 Deutschland Tour, Raivis Belohvoščiks
Stage 4 Tour de Suisse, Gabriele Missaglia
Stage 8 Tour de Suisse, Oscar Camenzind
Belgium Road Race Championship, Ludo Dierckxsens
Stage 11 Tour de France, Ludo Dierckxsens
Stage 1 Vuelta a España, Robbie Hunter

== 2000 Lampre–Daikin ==
Antwerpen na-tour Dernyspektakel, Ludo Dierckxsens
Stage 2 Tirreno–Adriatico, Ján Svorada
Stage 1 Vuelta Ciclista al Pais Vasco, Massimo Codol
Stage 3 Giro d'Italia, Ján Svorada
Stage 14 Giro d'Italia, Gilberto Simoni
Stage 21 Giro d'Italia, Mariano Piccoli
Stage 3 Euskal Bizikleta, Marco Serpellini
South Africa Time Trial Championship, Robbie Hunter
Overall Tour de Suisse, Oscar Camenzind

Stage 5, Raivis Belohvoščiks

Stage 4 Volta Ciclista a Catalunya, Gabriele Missaglia
Latvia Time Trial Championship, Raivis Belohvoščiks
Vattenfall Cyclassics, Gabriele Missaglia
Stages 2 & 3a Ronde van Nederland, Robbie Hunter
Stage 5 Tour de Pologne, Marco Pinotti
Stage 13 Vuelta a España, Marco Pinotti
Stage 16 Vuelta a España, Gilberto Simoni
Stage 19 Vuelta a España, Mariano Piccoli
Gran Premio Industria e Commercio di Prato, Sergio Barbero
Giro dell´Emilia, Gilberto Simoni
G.P. Beghelli, Marco Serpellini
Japan Cup, Massimo Codol

== 2001 Lampre–Daikin ==
Antwerpen na-tour Dernyspektakel, Ludo Dierckxsens
Profronde van Almelo, Ludo Dierckxsens
Ronde van Pijnacker, Ján Svorada
Liège – Bastogne – Liège, Oscar Camenzind
Stage 3 4 Jours de Dunkerque, Ján Svorada
Stage 4 Tour de Romandie, Gilberto Simoni
Overall Giro d'Italia, Gilberto Simoni

Stage 20, Gilberto Simoni

Stage 4 Tour de Luxembourg, Raivis Belohvoščiks
Stage 10 Tour de Suisse, Oscar Camenzind
Latvia Time Trial Championship, Raivis Belohvoščiks
Stage 20 Tour de France, Ján Svorada
Tour de Rijke, Robbie Hunter
Stage 14 Vuelta a España, Juan Manuel Gárate
Stage 17 Vuelta a España, Robbie Hunter
Stage 20 Vuelta a España, Gilberto Simoni
Japan Cup, Gilberto Simoni

== 2002 Lampre–Daikin ==
Nacht van Peer, Ludo Dierckxsens
GP Chiasso, Rubens Bertogliati
Stage 4 Tour of Qatar, Alberto Loddo
Stages 1 & 4 Tour de Belgique, Ján Svorada
Stage 17 Giro d'Italia, Pavel Tonkov
Stage 7 Tour de Suisse, Juan Manuel Gárate
Latvia Time Trial Championship, Raivis Belohvoščiks
Latvia Road Race Championship, Raivis Belohvoščiks
Japan Cup, Sergio Barbero

== 2003 Lampre–Caffita ==
Criterium d´Abruzzo, Matteo Carrara
Overall Tour of Qatar, Alberto Loddo

Stage 1, Alberto Loddo

Stages 2, 3 & 4 Tour de Langkawi, Luciano Pagliarini
Clásica de Almería, Luciano Pagliarini
Stage 4 Vuelta Ciclista al Pais Vasco, Marco Pinotti
Stage 1 Tour de Romandie, Simone Bertoletti
Stage 4a Euskal Bizikleta, Francesco Casagrande
Stage 5 Tour of Austria, Matteo Carrara
Stages 3 & 5 Tour de Suisse, Francesco Casagrande
GP Città´ di Camaiore, Marco Serpellini
Coppa Ugo Agostoni, Francesco Casagrande
Coppa Bernocchi, Sergio Barbero
Trofeo Melinda, Francesco Casagrande
Japan Cup, Sergio Barbero

== 2004 Lampre–Caffita ==
Profronde van Made, Igor Astarloa
Stages, 1, 7 & 8 Tour de Langkawi, Luciano Pagliarini
Stage 4 Giro del Trentino, Ján Svorada
Stage 1 Tour de Romandie, Ján Svorada
Stage 1 Tour de Belgique, Gianluca Bortolami
Giro Ciclistico d´Italia, Marco Marzano
Stage 1 Brixia Tour, Igor Astarloa
Giro di Romagna et Coppa Placci, Gianluca Bortolami

== 2005 Lampre ==
Stage 5 Paris–Nice, Gilberto Simoni
Stage 1 Driedaagse van De Panne, Alessandro Ballan
Giro dell'Appennino, Gilberto Simoni
Stage 3 Tour de Romandie, Damiano Cunego
Giro di Toscana, Daniele Bennati
Austria Road Race Championships, Gerrit Glomser
Stage 4 Eneco Tour, Alessandro Ballan
Stages 3, 5 & 9 Deutschland Tour, Daniele Bennati
Giro del Veneto, Eddy Mazzoleni
Gran Premio Nobili Rubinetterie, Damiano Cunego
Trofeo Melinda, Damiano Cunego
Stages 2 & 4 Tour de Pologne, Daniele Bennati
Giro dell'Emilia, Gilberto Simoni
Japan Cup, Damiano Cunego

== 2006 Lampre–Fondital ==
Stage 1 Tour Méditerranéen, Danilo Napolitano
Trofeo Laigueglia, Alessandro Ballan
Stage 5 Volta a la Comunitat Valenciana, Daniele Bennati
Stage 3 Paris–Nice, Patxi Vila
Overall Settimana Internazionale di Coppi e Bartali, Damiano Cunego

Stages 1a & 4, Danilo Napolitano
Stage 3, Damiano Cunego

Giro d'Oro, Damiano Cunego
Overall Giro del Trentino, Damiano Cunego

Stage 2, Damiano Cunego
Stage 4, Daniele Bennati

GP Industria & Artigianato di Larciano, Damiano Cunego
Stage 7 Volta a Catalunya, Daniele Bennati
Memorial Marco Pantani, Daniele Bennati
Italy Time Trial Championships, Marzio Bruseghin
Stages 1 & 5 Tour of Austria, Danilo Napolitano
Stage 3a Brixia Tour, Danilo Napolitano
Stage 3b Brixia Tour, Giuliano Figueras
Giro del Lazio, Giuliano Figueras
Coppa Bernocchi, Danilo Napolitano
Stages 2 & 4 Tour de Pologne, Daniele Bennati
Gran Premio Città di Misano – Adriatico, Daniele Bennati
Gran Premio Industria e Commercio di Prato, Daniele Bennati
Giro del Piemonte, Daniele Bennati

== 2007 Lampre–Fondital ==
Stage 2 Tour Méditerranéen, Daniele Bennati
Stage 1, 3 & 5 Volta a la Comunitat Valenciana, Daniele Bennati
Stage 5 Vuelta a Murcia, Danilo Napolitano
Stage 6 Tirreno Adriatico, Matteo Bono
Overall Three Days of De Panne, Alessandro Ballan

Stage 2, Daniele Bennati

Tour of Flanders, Alessandro Ballan
Overall Giro del Trentino, Damiano Cunego

Stage 1 & 2, Damiano Cunego

Stage 3 Tour de Romandie, Matteo Bono
Stage 9 Giro d'Italia, Danilo Napolitano
Stage 13 Giro d'Italia, Marzio Bruseghin
Trofeo Super Team classification, Giro d'Italia
Stage 1 Tour of Slovenia, Danilo Napolitano
Slovenia Road Race Championship, Tadej Valjavec
Stage 1 Tour of Austria, Fabio Baldato
Stage 17 & 20 Tour de France, Daniele Bennati
Stage 4 Deutschland Tour, Damiano Cunego
Vattenfall Cyclassics, Alessandro Ballan
Coppa Bernocchi, Danilo Napolitano
Stage 1, 17 & 21 Vuelta a España, Daniele Bennati
Stage 1 Tour de Pologne, Team Time Trial
Stage 4 Tour de Pologne, Danilo Napolitano
Gran Premio Città di Misano – Adriatico, Danilo Napolitano
Gran Premio Bruno Beghelli, Damiano Cunego
Giro di Lombardia, Damiano Cunego

== 2008 Lampre ==
Stage 5 Tour of Qatar, Danilo Napolitano
Stage 3 Giro della Provincia di Grosseto, Danilo Napolitano
Stage 4 Volta a la Comunitat Valenciana, Mirco Lorenzetto
Stage 5 Volta a la Comunitat Valenciana, Danilo Napolitano
Stage 5 Tour of the Basque Country, Damiano Cunego
Klasika Primavera, Damiano Cunego
Stage 2 Presidential Cycling Tour of Turkey, Mirco Lorenzetto
Amstel Gold Race, Damiano Cunego
Stage 10 Giro d'Italia, Marzio Bruseghin
Stage 1a Brixia Tour, Danilo Napolitano
Stage 1 & 2 Volta a Portugal, Danilo Napolitano
Stage 7 Vuelta a España, Alessandro Ballan
Road World Championships, Alessandro Ballan
Giro di Lombardia, Damiano Cunego
Japan Cup, Damiano Cunego

== 2009 Lampre–NGC ==
Stage 1 & 2 Giro di Sardegna, Mirco Lorenzetto
Giro del Friuli, Mirco Lorenzetto
Overall Settimana Internazionale di Coppi e Bartali, Damiano Cunego

Stage 2 & 3, Damiano Cunego

Stage 2 Critérium du Dauphiné Libéré, Angelo Furlan
Stage 3 Tour of Slovenia, Simon Špilak
Overall Tour de Pologne, Alessandro Ballan

Stage 2, Angelo Furlan
Stage 5, Alessandro Ballan

Tre Valli Varesine, Mauro Santambrogio
Stage 8 & 14 Vuelta a España, Damiano Cunego
Rund um die Nürnberger Altstadt, Francesco Gavazzi
Stage 1 Tour of Hainan, Vitaliy Buts

== 2010 Lampre–Farnese Vini ==
Stages 2 & 4 Giro della Provincia di Reggio Calabria, Alessandro Petacchi
Gran Premio della Costa Etruschi, Alessandro Petacchi
Stage 1 Giro di Sardegna, Francesco Gavazzi
Stage 3 Giro di Sardegna, Alessandro Petacchi
Stage 4 Giro di Sardegna, Danilo Hondo
Stage 3 Tour of the Basque Country, Francesco Gavazzi
Overall Tour de Romandie, Simon Špilak

Stage 4, Simon Špilak

Stage 5 Bayern Rundfahrt, Marcin Sapa
Stage 1 Critérium du Dauphiné, Grega Bole
Stage 4 Tour de Suisse, Alessandro Petacchi
Stages 1 & 2 Tour of Slovenia, Grega Bole
Stages 1 & 4 Tour de France, Alessandro Petacchi

Points classification, Alessandro Petacchi

Stage 4 Tour de Pologne, Mirco Lorenzetto
Coppa Ugo Agostoni, Francesco Gavazzi
Stage 7 Vuelta a España, Alessandro Petacchi
Gran Premio Industria e Commercio di Prato, Diego Ulissi

== 2011 Lampre–ISD ==
Overall Giro della Provincia di Reggio Calabria, Daniele Pietropolli

Stage 1, Daniele Pietropolli

Trofeo Laigueglia, Daniele Pietropolli
Stage 2 Giro di Sardegna, Damiano Cunego
Stage 5 Giro di Sardegna, Michele Scarponi
Stage 4 Tirreno–Adriatico, Michele Scarponi
Stage 2 Volta a Catalunya, Alessandro Petacchi
Stage 4 Settimana Internazionale di Coppi e Bartali, Adriano Malori
Stage 5 Tour of the Basque Country, Francesco Gavazzi
Giro dell'Appennino, Damiano Cunego
Overall Giro del Trentino, Michele Scarponi
Stage 4 Presidential Cycling Tour of Turkey, Alessandro Petacchi
Stage 2 Tour de Romandie, Damiano Cunego
Stage 2 Giro d'Italia, Alessandro Petacchi
Stage 17 Giro d'Italia, Diego Ulissi
Overall Tour of Slovenia, Diego Ulissi

Stage 2, Diego Ulissi

Slovenia Road Race Championships, Grega Bole
Ukraine Road Race Championships, Oleksandr Kvachuk
Ukraine Time Trial Championships, Oleksandr Kvachuk
Italy Time Trial Championships, Adriano Malori
Stages 6 & 10 Volta a Portugal, Francesco Gavazzi
Stage 5 Eneco Tour, Matteo Bono
GP Ouest-France, Grega Bole
Stage 18 Vuelta a España, Francesco Gavazzi
Overall Giro d'Italia, Michele Scarponi

== 2012 Lampre–ISD ==
Stages 3 & 4 Settimana Internazionale di Coppi e Bartali, Diego Ulissi
Stage 2 Giro del Trentino, Damiano Cunego
Stages 1, 3 & 5 Bayern Rundfahrt, Alessandro Petacchi
Gran Premio Industria e Commercio Artigianato Carnaghese, Diego Ulissi

== 2013 Lampre–Merida ==
Stage 2 La Tropicale Amissa Bongo, Andrea Palini
Trofeo Laigueglia, Filippo Pozzato
Overall Settimana Internazionale di Coppi e Bartali, Diego Ulissi

Stage 2, Diego Ulissi
Stage 3, Damiano Cunego
Stage 4 (ITT), Adriano Malori

Overall Bayern Rundfahrt, Adriano Malori

Stage 4 (ITT), Adriano Malori

Stage 1 Tour de Pologne, Diego Ulissi
Coppa Ugo Agostoni, Filippo Pozzato
Tre Valli Varesine, Kristijan Đurasek
GP Ouest-France, Filippo Pozzato
Gran Premio della Costa Etruschi, Michele Scarponi
Milano–Torino, Diego Ulissi
Coppa Sabatini, Diego Ulissi
Giro dell'Emilia, Diego Ulissi

== 2014 Lampre–Merida ==
Stage 2 Tour Down Under, Diego Ulissi
Stage 7 Tour de San Luis, Sacha Modolo
Trofeo Palma, Sacha Modolo
Trofeo Ses Salines, Sacha Modolo
Stage 1 Volta ao Algarve, Sacha Modolo
Trofeo Laigueglia, José Serpa
Gran Premio Città di Camaiore, Diego Ulissi
Stages 2 & 3a Three Days of De Panne, Sacha Modolo
Stages 5 & 8 Giro d'Italia, Diego Ulissi
Stage 6 Tour of Japan, Niccolò Bonifazio
Overall Tour de Suisse, Rui Costa

Stage 5, Sacha Modolo
Stage 9, Rui Costa

Portugal Time Trial Championships, Nelson Oliveira
Portugal Road RaceChampionships, Nelson Oliveira
Stage 9 Vuelta a España, Winner Anacona
Stage 15 Vuelta a España, Przemysław Niemiec
Coppa Ugo Agostoni – Giro delle Brianze, Niccolò Bonifazio
Gran Premio Bruno Beghelli, Valerio Conti
Stage 5 Tour of Beijing, Sacha Modolo
Stages 2, 6 & 8 Tour of Hainan, Niccolò Bonifazio
Stage 5 Tour of Hainan, Andrea Palini

== 2015 Lampre–Merida ==
African Continental Time Trial Championships, Tsgabu Grmay
Trofeo Laigueglia, Davide Cimolai
Overall Tour of Oman, Rafael Valls

Stage 4, Rafael Valls

Gran Premio di Lugano, Niccolò Bonifazio
Stage 5 Paris–Nice, Davide Cimolai
Overall, Tour of Turkey, Kristijan Đurasek

Stage 5, Sacha Modolo

Stage 5 Giro d'Italia, Jan Polanc
Stage 7 Giro d'Italia, Diego Ulissi
Stages 13 & 17 Giro d'Italia, Sacha Modolo
Stage 6 Tour of Japan, Valerio Conti
Stage 7 Tour of Japan, Niccolò Bonifazio
Stage 6 Critérium du Dauphiné, Rui Costa
Stage 2 Tour de Suisse, Kristijan Đurasek
Portugal Time Trial Championships, Nelson Oliveira
Portugal Road Race Championships, Rui Costa
Ethiopia Time Trial Championships, Tsgabu Grmay
Ethiopia Road Race Championships, Tsgabu Grmay
Slovenia Road Race Championships, Luka Pibernik
Stage 7 Tour of Qinghai Lake, Ilia Koshevoy
Stage 16 Tour de France, Rubén Plaza
Stage 13 Vuelta a España, Nelson Oliveira
Stage 20 Vuelta a España, Rubén Plaza
Chrono Champenois, Filippo Ganna
Memorial Marco Pantani, Diego Ulissi
Overall Tour of Hainan, Sacha Modolo

Stages 3 & 4, Sacha Modolo

== 2016 Lampre–Merida ==
Stage 6 Volta a Catalunya, Davide Cimolai
Stage 1 Tour of Turkey, Przemysław Niemiec
Stages 4 & 7 Tour of Turkey, Sacha Modolo
Stages 4 & 11 Giro d'Italia, Diego Ulissi
Stage 2 Tour of Japan, Davide Cimolai
Stage 7 Tour of Japan, Yukiya Arashiro
Stage 3 (ITT) Tour of Slovenia, Diego Ulissi
Stage 7 Tour of Qinghai Lake, Federico Zurlo
Stages 9 & 10 Tour of Qinghai Lake, Marko Kump
Circuito de Getxo, Diego Ulissi
Overall Czech Cycling Tour, Diego Ulissi

Stage 2, Sacha Modolo
Stage 3, Diego Ulissi

Stage 6 Eneco Tour, Luka Pibernik
Stage 13 Vuelta a España, Valerio Conti
Stage 6 Tour of Hainan, Matej Mohorič

== 2017 UAE Abu Dhabi / UAE Team Emirates ==
Stage 5 Vuelta a San Juan, Rui Costa
G.P. Costa degli Etruschi, Diego Ulissi
Overall Abu Dhabi Tour, Rui Costa

Stage 3, Rui Costa

United Arab Emirates Time Trial Championships, Yousif Mirza
United Arab Emirates Road Race Championships, Yousif Mirza
Stages 1 & 6 Tour of Croatia, Sacha Modolo
Stage 2 Tour of Croatia, Kristijan Đurasek
Stage 4 Giro d'Italia, Jan Polanc
Grand Prix of Aargau Canton, Sacha Modolo
Slovenia Time Trial Championships, Jan Polanc
Stage 2 Tour de Pologne, Sacha Modolo
Stage 7 Vuelta a España, Matej Mohorič
Grand Prix Cycliste de Montréal, Diego Ulissi
Hong Kong Challenge, Matej Mohorič
UEC European Track Championships – Individual Pursuit, Filippo Ganna

== 2018 UAE Team Emirates ==
Asian Continental Road Race Championships, Yousif Mirza
Stage 6 Tour of Oman, Alexander Kristoff
Stage 1 Abu Dhabi Tour, Alexander Kristoff
United Arab Emirates Time Trial Championships, Yousif Mirza
United Arab Emirates Road Race Championships, Yousif Mirza
World Track Championships (Individual Pursuit), Filippo Ganna
Eschborn–Frankfurt, Alexander Kristoff
Grand Prix of Aargau Canton, Alexander Kristoff
Stage 5 Critérium du Dauphiné, Daniel Martin
Stage 1 Tour of Slovenia, Simone Consonni
Stage 5 Tour de Suisse, Diego Ulissi
Norway National Road Race Championships, Vegard Stake Laengen
Stage 6 Tour de France, Daniel Martin
Stage 21 Tour de France, Alexander Kristoff
UEC European Track Championships – Individual Pursuit, Filippo Ganna

== 2019 UAE Team Emirates ==
Stage 5 Tour Down Under, Jasper Philipsen
Stages 1 & 4 Vuelta a San Juan, Fernando Gaviria
Stage 3 Tour Colombia, Juan Sebastián Molano
Stage 1 Tour of Oman, Alexander Kristoff
United Arab Emirates Time Trial Championships, Yousif Mirza
Overall Volta ao Algarve, Tadej Pogačar

Stage 2, Tadej Pogačar

Stage 2 UAE Tour, Fernando Gaviria
United Arab Emirates Road Race Championships, Yousif Mirza
Gent–Wevelgem, Alexander Kristoff
Stage 3 Giro d'Italia, Fernando Gaviria
Overall Tour of California, Tadej Pogačar

Stage 6, Tadej Pogačar

Overall Tour of Norway, Alexander Kristoff

Stage 5, Alexander Kristoff

Slovenia Time Trial Championships, Tadej Pogačar
GP Lugano, Diego Ulissi
Grand Prix of Aargau Canton, Alexander Kristoff
Overall Tour of Slovenia, Diego Ulissi

Stage 3, Diego Ulissi

Stage 2 Deutschland Tour, Alexander Kristoff
Young rider classification Vuelta a España, Tadej Pogačar

Stages 9, 13 & 20, Tadej Pogačar

Coppa Ugo Agostoni, Alexandr Riabushenko
Stage 1a Okolo Slovenska, Alexander Kristoff

== 2020 UAE Team Emirates ==
Stages 2, 4 & 7 Vuelta a San Juan, Fernando Gaviria
Stage 1 Tour of Saudi Arabia, Rui Costa
Overall Volta a la Comunitat Valenciana, Tadej Pogačar

Stages 2 & 4, Tadej Pogačar

Stages 2, 3 & 5 Tour Colombia, Juan Sebastián Molano
Stage 5 UAE Tour, Tadej Pogačar
Slovenia Time Trial Championships, Tadej Pogačar
Stage 2 Vuelta a Burgos, Fernando Gaviria
Stage 3 Critérium du Dauphiné, Davide Formolo
Portugal Time Trial Championships, Ivo Oliveira
Portugal Road Race Championships, Rui Costa
Stage 2 Tour du Limousin, Fernando Gaviria
Stage 3 Tour du Limousin, Jasper Philipsen
Norway National Road Race Championships, Sven Erik Bystrøm
Trofeo Matteotti, Valerio Conti
Overall Tour de France, Tadej Pogačar

Mountains classification, Tadej Pogačar
Young rider classification, Tadej Pogačar
Stage 1, Alexander Kristoff
Stages 9, 15 & 20 (ITT), Tadej Pogačar

Overall Tour de Luxembourg, Diego Ulissi

Stages 1 & 4, Diego Ulissi

Giro di Toscana, Fernando Gaviria
Stage 1 BinckBank Tour, Jasper Philipsen
Stages 2 & 13 Giro d'Italia, Diego Ulissi
Stage 15 Vuelta a España, Jasper Philipsen
UEC European Track Championships – Individual Pursuit, Ivo Oliveira

== 2021 UAE Team Emirates ==
Overall UAE Tour, Tadej Pogačar

Stage 3, Tadej Pogačar

African Continental Championships, Time Trial, Ryan Gibbons
United Arab Emirates Road Race Championships, Yousif Mirza
United Arab Emirates Time Trial Championships, Yousif Mirza
African Continental Championships, Road Race, Ryan Gibbons
Overall Tirreno–Adriatico, Tadej Pogačar

Stage 4, Tadej Pogačar

South Africa Time Trial Championships, Ryan Gibbons
Stage 3 Tour of the Basque Country, Tadej Pogačar
Liège–Bastogne–Liège, Tadej Pogačar
Stage 4 Giro d'Italia, Joe Dombrowski
Trofeo Calvià, Ryan Gibbons
Overall Tour of Slovenia, Tadej Pogačar

Stage 2, Tadej Pogačar
Stage 4, Diego Ulissi

Overall Tour de France, Tadej Pogačar

Mountains classification, Tadej Pogačar
Young rider classification, Tadej Pogačar
Stages 5 (ITT), 17 & 18, Tadej Pogačar

Overall Settimana Ciclistica Italiana, Diego Ulissi

Stages 1 & 4, Diego Ulissi

Stages 2 & 4 Vuelta a Burgos, Juan Sebastián Molano
Stage 3 Tour de Pologne, Fernando Gaviria
Stages 2 & 4 Deutschland Tour, Alexander Kristoff
Stage 15 Vuelta a España, Rafał Majka
Stage 2 Tour de Luxembourg, Marc Hirschi
Trofeo Matteotti, Matteo Trentin
Stages 1 & 2 Giro di Sicilia, Juan Sebastián Molano
Giro di Lombardia, Tadej Pogačar

== 2022 UAE Team Emirates ==
Trofeo Calvià, Brandon McNulty
Stages 1 & 6 Tour of Oman, Fernando Gaviria
Vuelta a Murcia, Alessandro Covi
Stage 2 Vuelta a Andalucía, Alessandro Covi
Overall UAE Tour, Tadej Pogačar

Stages 4 & 7, Tadej Pogačar

Faun-Ardèche Classic, Brandon McNulty
Le Samyn, Matteo Trentin
Trofeo Laigueglia, Jan Polanc
United Arab Emirates Time Trial Championships, Yousif Mirza
Strade Bianche, Tadej Pogačar
Stage 5 Paris–Nice, Brandon McNulty
Overall Tirreno–Adriatico, Tadej Pogačar

Stages 4 & 6, Tadej Pogačar

United Arab Emirates Road Race Championships, Yousif Mirza
Bredene Koksijde Classic, Pascal Ackermann
Per sempre Alfredo, Marc Hirschi
Stage 4 Volta a Catalunya, João Almeida
GP Industria & Artigianato, Diego Ulissi
Stage 20 Giro d'Italia, Alessandro Covi
Stage 4 Boucles de la Mayenne, Juan Sebastián Molano
Grand Prix of Aargau Canton, Marc Hirschi
Overall Tour of Slovenia, Tadej Pogačar

Stages 1 & 4, Rafał Majka
Stages 3 & 5, Tadej Pogačar

Switzerland Time Trial Championships, Joel Suter
Portugal Road Race Championships, João Almeida
Young rider classification Tour de France, Tadej Pogačar

Stages 6, 7 & 17, Tadej Pogačar

Circuito de Getxo, Juan Ayuso
Stage 4 Tour de Pologne, Pascal Ackermann
Stage 5 Vuelta a Burgos, João Almeida
Stage 3 Tour du Limousin, Diego Ulissi
Stage 5 Vuelta a España, Marc Soler
Stage 21 Vuelta a España, Juan Sebastián Molano
Grand Prix Cycliste de Montréal, Tadej Pogačar
Stage 2 Tour de Luxembourg, Matteo Trentin
Giro di Toscana, Marc Hirschi
Tre Valli Varesine, Tadej Pogačar
Giro di Lombardia, Tadej Pogačar
Giro del Veneto, Matteo Trentin
Veneto Classic, Marc Hirschi

== 2023 UAE Team Emirates ==
Australia National Time Trial Championships, Jay Vine
Overall Tour Down Under, Jay Vine
Clásica Jaén Paraíso Interior, Tadej Pogačar
Stage 4 Tour of Oman, Diego Ulissi
Overall Vuelta a Andalucía, Tadej Pogačar

Stages 1, 2 & 4, Tadej Pogačar
Stage 3, Tim Wellens

Stage 4 UAE Tour, Juan Sebastián Molano
Stage 7 UAE Tour, Adam Yates
Overall Paris–Nice, Tadej Pogačar

Stages 4, 7 & 8, Tadej Pogačar

Grand Prix de Denain, Juan Sebastián Molano
Tour of Flanders, Tadej Pogačar
Stage 1 Giro di Sicilia, Finn Fisher-Black
Amstel Gold Race, Tadej Pogačar
La Flèche Wallonne, Tadej Pogačar
Overall Tour de Romandie, Adam Yates

Stage 3 (ITT), Juan Ayuso
Stage 4, Adam Yates

Overall Tour de Hongrie, Marc Hirschi

Stage 3, Marc Hirschi

Young rider classification Giro d'Italia, João Almeida

Stage 11, Pascal Ackermann
Stage 15, Brandon McNulty
Stage 16, João Almeida

Prologue Boucles de la Mayenne, Ivo Oliveira
Giro dell'Appennino, Marc Hirschi
Stage 4 (ITT) Critérium du Dauphiné, Mikkel Bjerg
Stages 5 & 8 (ITT) Tour de Suisse, Juan Ayuso
Slovenia National Time Trial Championships, Tadej Pogačar
United States National Time Trial Championships, Brandon McNulty
Portugal National Time Trial Championships, João Almeida
Switzerland National Road Race Championships, Marc Hirschi
Portugal National Road Race Championships, Ivo Oliveira
Slovenia National Road Race Championships, Tadej Pogačar
Young rider classification Tour de France, Tadej Pogačar

Stage 1, Adam Yates
Stages 6 & 20, Tadej Pogačar

Stage 1 Tour of Austria, Pascal Ackermann
Prueba Villafranca de Ordizia, Marc Hirschi
Stage 3 Tour de Pologne, Rafał Majka
Stage 1 Vuelta a Burgos, Juan Sebastián Molano
Overall Renewi Tour, Tim Wellens
Young rider classification Vuelta a España, Juan Ayuso

Stage 12, Juan Sebastián Molano

Grand Prix Cycliste de Montréal, Adam Yates
Coppa Sabatini, Marc Hirschi
Trofeo Matteotti, Sjoerd Bax
Overall Tour de Luxembourg, Marc Hirschi
Coppa Ugo Agostoni, Davide Formolo
Giro di Lombardia, Tadej Pogačar
Stage 7 Presidential Tour of Turkey, Jay Vine
Veneto Classic, Davide Formolo
Stage 5 Tour of Guangxi, Juan Sebastián Molano

== 2024 UAE Team Emirates ==
Stage 2 Tour Down Under, Isaac del Toro
Overall Volta a la Comunitat Valenciana, Brandon McNulty

Stage 4, Brandon McNulty

Muscat Classic, Finn Fisher-Black
Overall Tour of Oman, Adam Yates

Stage 2, Finn Fisher-Black
Stage 5, Adam Yates

Stage 2 (ITT) UAE Tour, Brandon McNulty
Faun-Ardèche Classic, Juan Ayuso
La Drôme Classic, Marc Hirschi
Strade Bianche, Tadej Pogačar
Stage 1 (ITT) Tirreno–Adriatico, Juan Ayuso
Stage 3 (TTT) Paris–Nice (Note: The riders on the squad were João Almeida, Brandon McNulty, Finn Fisher-Black, Jay Vine, Marc Soler, Felix Großschartner and Nils Politt)
Overall Volta a Catalunya, Tadej Pogačar

Stages 2, 3, 6 & 7, Tadej Pogačar

Stage 2 Settimana Internazionale di Coppi e Bartali, Diego Ulissi
GP Miguel Induráin, Brandon McNulty
Overall Tour of the Basque Country, Juan Ayuso
Stage 2 Giro d'Abruzzo, Jan Christen
Stage 4 Giro d'Abruzzo, Pavel Sivakov
Giro della Romagna, António Morgado
Liège–Bastogne–Liège, Tadej Pogačar
Stage 3 (ITT) Tour de Romandie, Brandon McNulty
Overall Vuelta a Asturias, Isaac del Toro

Stage 1, Isaac del Toro
Stage 2, António Morgado
Stage 3, Finn Fisher-Black

Overall Giro d'Italia, Tadej Pogačar

Stages 2, 7 (ITT), 8, 15, 16 & 21 Tadej Pogačar

United States National Time Trial Championships, Brandon McNulty
Overall Tour de Suisse, Adam Yates

Stages 5 & 7, Adam Yates
Stages 6 & 8 (ITT), João Almeida

Belgium National Time Trial Championships, Tim Wellens
Germany National Time Trial Championships, Nils Politt
Austria National Time Trial Championships, Felix Großschartner
Portugal National Time Trial Championships, António Morgado
Slovenia National Road Race Championships, Domen Novak
Overall Tour de France, Tadej Pogačar

Stages 4, 14, 15, 19, 20 & 21 (ITT), Tadej Pogačar

Prueba Villafranca de Ordizia, Jan Christen
Overall Czech Tour, Marc Hirschi

Stage 2, Marc Hirschi

Stage 4 (ITT) Vuelta a Burgos, Jay Vine
Clásica de San Sebastián, Marc Hirschi
Stage 2 Tour de Pologne, Tim Wellens
Stage 1 (ITT) Vuelta a España, Brandon McNulty
Bretagne Classic, Marc Hirschi
Stage 9 Vuelta a España, Adam Yates
Stage 16 Vuelta a España, Marc Soler
Overall Renewi Tour, Tim Wellens
GP Industria & Artigianato, Marc Hirschi
Coppa Sabatini, Marc Hirschi
Memorial Marco Pantani, Marc Hirschi
Grand Prix Cycliste de Montréal, Tadej Pogačar
Stage 4 (ITT) Tour de Luxembourg, Juan Ayuso
Super 8 Classic, Filippo Baroncini
Overall CRO Race, Brandon McNulty

Stage 2, Juan Sebastián Molano
Stage 3, Brandon McNulty

Giro dell'Emilia, Tadej Pogačar
Coppa Agostoni, Marc Hirschi
Il Lombardia, Tadej Pogačar

== 2025 UAE Team Emirates XRG ==
Overall Tour Down Under, Jhonatan Narváez

Stage 5, Jhonatan Narváez

Gran Premio Castellón, António Morgado
Trofeo Calvià, Jan Christen
Ecuador National Road Race Championships, Jhonatan Narváez
Overall Tour of Oman, Adam Yates
Figueira Champions Classic, António Morgado
Overall UAE Tour, Tadej Pogačar

Stages 3 & 7, Tadej Pogačar

Stage 2 Volta ao Algarve, Jan Christen
Overall Vuelta a Andalucía, Pavel Sivakov
La Drôme Classic, Juan Ayuso
Trofeo Laigueglia, Juan Ayuso
Strade Bianche, Tadej Pogačar
Stage 4, Paris–Nice, João Almeida
Overall Tirreno–Adriatico, Juan Ayuso

Young rider classification, Juan Ayuso
Stage 6, Juan Ayuso

Milano–Torino, Isaac del Toro
Classic Brugge–De Panne, Juan Sebastián Molano
Young rider classification, Volta a Catalunya, Juan Ayuso

Stage 3, Juan Ayuso

Points classification, Settimana Internazionale di Coppi e Bartali, Jay Vine

Young rider classification, Igor Arrieta
Stages 3 & 5, Jay Vine

Tour of Flanders, Tadej Pogačar
Overall Tour of the Basque Country, João Almeida

Points classifcation, João Almeida
Stages 4 & 6, João Almeida

Il Giro d'Abruzzo

Stage 1, Alessandro Covi
Stages 2 & 4, Ivo Oliveira

La Flèche Wallonne, Tadej Pogačar
Overall Vuelta a Asturias, Marc Soler

Points classification, Marc Soler
Mountains classification, Marc Soler
Stage 3, Alessandro Covi
Stage 4, Marc Soler

Liège–Bastogne–Liège, Tadej Pogačar
Overall Tour de Romandie, João Almeida

Points classification, Jay Vine
Stage 3, Jay Vine

Young rider classification Giro d'Italia, Isaac del Toro

Stage 7, Juan Ayuso
Stage 17, Isaac del Toro

Stage 5 Tour de Hongrie, Juan Sebastián Molano
Stage 5 Tour of Slovenia, Ivo Oliveira

== Supplementary statistics ==
=== 1999 to 2019 ===
Grand Tours by highest finishing position
Race	1999	2000	2001	2002	2003	2004	2005	2006	2007	2008	2009	2010	2011	2012	2013	2014	2015	2016	2017	2018	2019
Giro d'Italia	11	3	1	4	6	7	2	4	5	3	7	11	1	4	4	19	40	21	11	24	14
Tour de France	50	–	52	3	–	–	13	11	18	25	51	26	6	24	21	17	30	8	8	8	14
Vuelta a España	22	22	36	31	52	23	24	14	25	10	8	16	53	15	15	26	21	40	12	23	3
Major week-long stage races by highest finishing position
Race	1999	2000	2001	2002	2003	2004	2005	2006	2007	2008	2009	2010	2011	2012	2013	2014	2015	2016	2017	2018	2019
Tour Down Under	16	–	–	–	–	–	12	–	–	14	8	–	16	35	8	3	11	11	5	4	9
Paris–Nice	–	–	–	–	–	–	–	2	4	12	42	29	13	13	7	2	4	10	27	DNF	31
Tirreno–Adriatico	9	5	7	49	29	21	45	3	22	9	46	9	3	7	9	11	12	27	18	12	10
Volta a Catalunya	28	23	29	11	–	18	49	16	49	49	48	42	1	6	3	38	8	51	13	38	23
Tour of the Basque Country	–	19	16	26	8	13	8	9	4	4	6	24	19	4	14	11	7	7	6	12	2
Giro del Trentino	15	7	4	10	15	17	2	1	1	8	6	18	1	2	6	3	–	–	–	6	–
Tour de Romandie	5	6	5	14	44	12	2	10	9	11	37	1	16	49	20	3	25	6	13	5	2
Critérium du Dauphiné	–	–	–	–	–	–	44	16	9	8	27	70	51	76	21	34	3	9	8	4	8
Tour de Suisse	5	1	2	6	32	11	28	57	5	4	6	21	2	28	21	1	15	7	5	9	13
Tour de Pologne	–	19	26	–	–	–	13	3	5	5	1	2	11	15	26	5	6	27	10	10	3
Benelux Tour	10	2	9	36	–	10	18	8	32	30	10	11	16	23	23	18	45	42	33	12	20
Monument races by highest finishing position
Monument	1999	2000	2001	2002	2003	2004	2005	2006	2007	2008	2009	2010	2011	2012	2013	2014	2015	2016	2017	2018	2019
Milan–San Remo	3	4	25	8	8	6	28	5	11	5	17	3	6	43	33	8	5	58	17	4	14
Tour of Flanders	5	9	7	8	17	31	6	5	1	4	41	9	16	34	44	17	12	104	6	16	3
Paris–Roubaix	11	8	6	15	20	11	30	3	8	3	23	40	84	64	22	50	61	85	26	18	56
Liège–Bastogne–Liège	8	13	1	5	5	20	8	3	7	30	7	19	16	8	5	13	4	3	14	18	18
Giro di Lombardia	4	8	7	4	38	24	2	6	1	1	13	26	5	13	25	3	37	15	21	9	18
Classics by highest finishing position
Classic	1999	2000	2001	2002	2003	2004	2005	2006	2007	2008	2009	2010	2011	2012	2013	2014	2015	2016	2017	2018	2019
Omloop Het Nieuwsblad	42	4	58	20	28	–	–	–	–	–	–	–	–	–	43	–	–	–	–	25	37
Kuurne–Brussels–Kuurne	41	8	18	74	–	16	–	–	–	–	–	–	–	–	–	–	–	–	–	28	24
Strade Bianche	Did not Exist								16	2	17	9	3	36	11	4	9	7	16	44	30
E3 Harelbeke	18	52	12	71	–	12	–	2	10	17	18	18	48	29	26	79	38	56	26	40	21
Gent–Wevelgem	2	16	37	17	–	–	3	27	25	52	51	19	27	75	39	25	DNF	38	10	25	1
Amstel Gold Race	3	8	14	38	6	54	56	11	87	1	5	6	15	31	25	17	4	7	27	17	13
La Flèche Wallonne	4	14	15	27	45	22	14	25	10	3	3	5	60	9	13	17	28	8	10	14	3
Clásica de San Sebastián	40	14	12	3	4	37	3	18	3	17	21	24	13	10	23	13	12	43	20	12	32
Paris–Tours	5	7	10	39	16	23	2	8	40	32	6	2	16	–	–	–	–	–	–	–	28

=== 2020 to present ===
Grand Tours by highest finishing position
Race	2020	2021	2022	2023	2024
Giro d'Italia	15	15	36	3	1
Tour de France	1	1	2	2	1
Vuelta a España	7	7	3	4	9
Major week-long stage races by highest finishing position
Race	2020	2021	2022	2023	2024
Tour Down Under	2	NH		1	3
Paris–Nice	–	43	8	1	3
Tirreno–Adriatico	22	1	1	2	2
Volta a Catalunya	NH	13	3	3	1
Tour of the Basque Country	NH	3	7	7	1
Tour de Romandie	NH	13	4	1	7
Critérium du Dauphiné	4	27	11	2	17
Tour de Suisse	NH	7	DNF (Note: The team did not start Stage 6 due to a positive Covid test.)	2	1
Tour de Pologne	5	4	9	2	2
Benelux Tour	13	15	NH (Note: The race was cancelled due to an overcrowded calendar.)	1	1
Monuments by highest finishing position
Monument	2020	2021	2022	2023	2024
Milan–San Remo	12	12	5	4	3
Tour of Flanders	3	18	4	1	3
Paris–Roubaix	NH	14	43	13	4
Liège–Bastogne–Liège	3	1	9	10	1
Il Lombardia	8	1	1	1	1
Classics by highest finishing position
Classic	2020	2021	2022	2023	2024
Omloop Het Nieuwsblad	48	8	7	9	2
Kuurne–Brussels–Kuurne	3	4	9	5	2
Strade Bianche	2	7	1	9	1
E3 Harelbeke	NH	18	43	3	4
Gent–Wevelgem	19	3	56	6	19
Amstel Gold Race	NH	12	9	1	2
La Flèche Wallonne	9	DNS (Note: The team did not start due to a positive Covid test.)	12	1	DNF
Clásica de San Sebastián	NH	5	13	11	1
Paris–Tours	–	–	26	39	20

Legend
—	Did not compete
DNF	Did not finish
DNS	Did not start
NH	Not held
