= Gran Premio Fred Mengoni =

Race details
- Date: August
- Region: Marches
- Discipline: Road race
- Competition: UCI Europe Tour
- Type: Single day race

History
- First edition: 2001
- Editions: 8
- Final edition: 2008
- First winner: Fabio Bulgarelli (ITA)
- Most wins: No repeat winners
- Final winner: Alexey Tsatevich (RUS)

The Gran Premio Fred Mengoni was a professional one day cycling race held annually in Italy. It was part of UCI Europe Tour in category 1.2 from 2005 to 2006 and 1.1 in 2008.

== Winners ==
Year	Country	Rider	Team
2001	Italy	Fabio Bulgarelli	
2002	Italy	Danilo Di Luca	Saeco–Longoni Sport
2003	Italy	Alessio Galletti	Saeco
2004	Italy	Damiano Cunego	Saeco
2005	Italy	Luca Mazzanti	Ceramica Panaria–Navigare
2006	Italy	Andrea Tonti	Acqua & Sapone
2007	Italy	Matteo Scaroni	
2008	Russia	Alexey Tsatevich	
