= 2006 Giro del Trentino =

Race details
- Dates: 18–21 April 2006
- Stages: 4
- Distance: 671.7 km (417.4 mi)
- Winning time: 16h 28' 25"

Results
	Winner	Damiano Cunego (ITA)
	Second	Luca Mazzanti (ITA)
	Third	Eddy Ratti (ITA)

The 2006 Giro del Trentino was the 30th edition of the Tour of the Alps cycle race and was held on 18 April to 21 April 2006. The race started and finished in Arco. The race was won by Damiano Cunego.

== General classification ==
Final general classification

Rank	Rider	Time
1	Damiano Cunego (ITA)	16h 28' 25"
2	Luca Mazzanti (ITA)	+ 4"
3	Eddy Ratti (ITA)	+ 8"
4	Andrea Tonti (ITA)	+ 10"
5	Emanuele Sella (ITA)	+ 14"
6	Sylwester Szmyd (POL)	+ 22"
7	Przemysław Niemiec (POL)	+ 27"
8	Gilberto Simoni (ITA)	+ 37"
9	Ezequiel Mosquera (ESP)	+ 43"
10	Tomaž Nose (SLO)	+ 43"
