= Andrea Tonti =

Italian cyclist (born 1976)

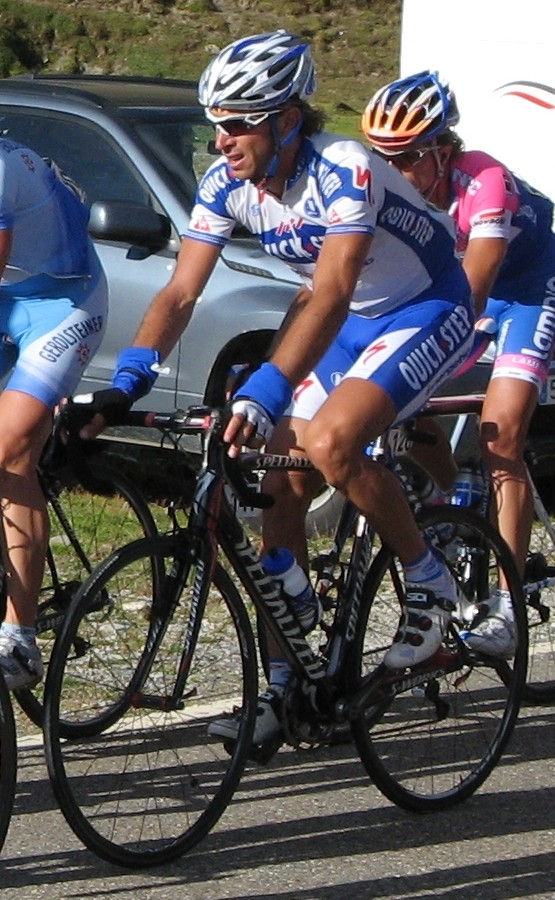

Personal information
- Full name: Andrea Tonti
- Born: 16 February 1976 (age 50) Osimo, Italy

Cycling career
- Sport: Cycling
- Discipline: Road
- Role: Rider

Professional teams
- 1999–2001: Cantina Tollo–Alexia Alluminio
- 2002–2004: Saeco–Longoni Sport
- 2005: Lampre–Caffita
- 2006: Acqua & Sapone
- 2007–2008: Quick-Step–Innergetic
- 2009: Fuji–Servetto
- 2010: Carmiooro NGC

Andrea Tonti (born 16 February 1976 in Osimo) is an Italian former professional road bicycle racer.

== Major results ==
2001
10th Giro d'Oro
2004
10th Giro dell'Appennino
2006 (2 pro wins)
1st GP Fred Mengoni
2nd Overall Peace Race
2nd Coppa Agostoni
4th Overall Giro del Trentino
5th Subida al Naranco
6th Overall Euskal Bizikleta

1st Stage 6

6th Overall Vuelta a Asturias
6th Overall Settimana Internazionale Coppi e Bartali
6th GP Lugano
8th Tre Valli Varesine
9th Milano–Torino
2010
10th Giro della Romagna

=== Grand Tour general classification results timeline ===
Grand Tour	2000	2001	2002	2003	2004	2005	2006	2007	2008
Giro d'Italia	23	—	—	54	29	55	—	DNF	33
Tour de France	—	—	—	—	—	—	—	—	—
Vuelta a España	—	136	—	—	—	—	—	DNF	DNF

Legend
—	Did not compete
DNF	Did not finish
