= 1963 Giro del Trentino =

Race details
- Dates: 22 June 1963
- Stages: 1
- Distance: 222 km (137.9 mi)
- Winning time: 6h 17' 30"

Results
	Winner	Guido De Rosso (ITA)
	Second	Franco Cribiori (ITA)
	Third	Ercole Baldini (ITA)

The 1963 Giro del Trentino was the second edition of the Tour of the Alps cycle race and was held on 22 June 1963. The race was won by Guido De Rosso.

== General classification ==
Final general classification

Rank	Rider	Time
1	Guido De Rosso (ITA)	6h 17' 30"
2	Franco Cribiori (ITA)	+ 0"
3	Ercole Baldini (ITA)	+ 0"
4	Romeo Venturelli (ITA)	+ 6' 05"
5	Italo Mazzacurati (ITA)	+ 6' 05"
6	Giuseppe Fallarini (ITA)	+ 6' 05"
7	Imerio Massignan (ITA)	+ 6' 05"
8	Gabriele Giusti (ITA)	+ 6' 05"
9	Giovanni Bettinelli (ITA)	+ 6' 05"
10	Carlo Chiappano (ITA)	+ 6' 05"
