= Damiano Cunego =

Italian road bicycle racer

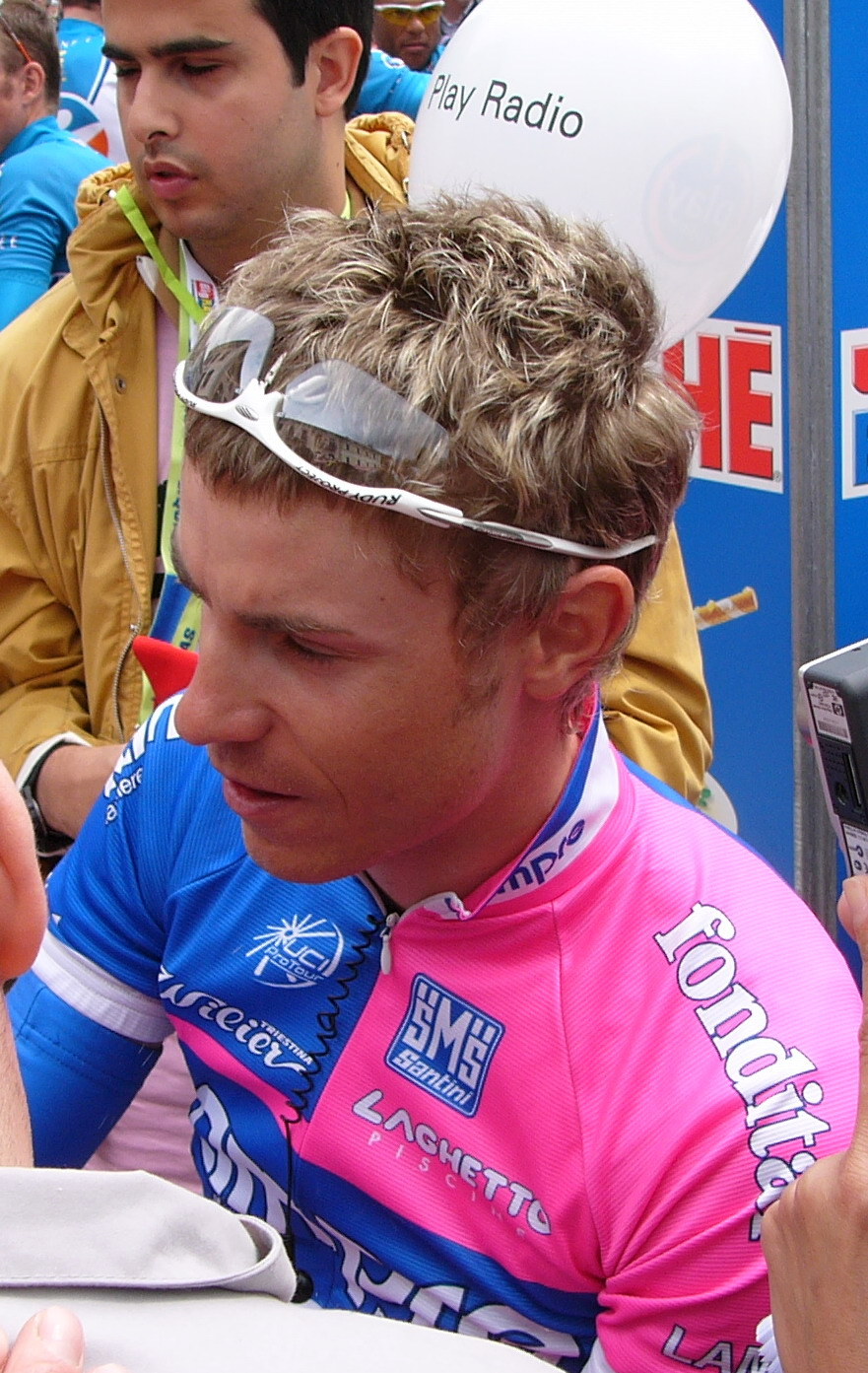
- Cunego at the 2006 Giro d'Italia

Personal information
- Full name: Damiano Cunego
- Nicknames: Il Piccolo Principe (The Little Prince), L'Astore del Montello (The Goshawk of the Montello)
- Born: 19 September 1981 (age 45) Cerro Veronese, Italy
- Height: 1.69 m (5 ft 7 in)
- Weight: 58 kg (128 lb; 9.1 st)

Cycling career
- Sport: Cycling
- Current team: Retired
- Discipline: Road
- Role: Rider
- Rider type: Climber; Puncheur

Amateur teams
- 1997–1999: Gaiga–Gore Tex
- 2000–2001: Zalf–Euromobil–Fior

Professional teams
- 2002–2004: Saeco–Longoni Sport
- 2005–2014: Lampre–Caffita
- 2015–2018: Nippo–Vini Fantini

Major wins
- Grand Tours Giro d'Italia General classification (2004) 4 individual stages (2004) Tour de France Young rider classification (2006) Vuelta a España 2 individual stages (2009) Stage races Giro del Trentino (2004, 2006, 2007) One-day races and Classics Giro di Lombardia (2004, 2007, 2008) Amstel Gold Race (2008)
Medal record
Representing Italy
Men's road bicycle racing
UCI Road World Championships
| Silver medal – second place | 2008 Varese | Road race |

Damiano Cunego (born 19 September 1981) is an Italian former professional road racing cyclist, who rode professionally between 2002 and 2018 for the Saeco, Lampre–Merida and Nippo–Vini Fantini–Europa Ovini teams.

Cunego's biggest wins were the 2004 Giro d'Italia, the 2008 Amstel Gold Race and the Giro di Lombardia in 2004, 2007 and 2008. He finished second in the UCI Road World Championships in 2008 and in the 2008 UCI ProTour. Primarily a climber, he improved his time-trialling and was characterised by great sprinting ability, unusual for a climber.

== Career ==
=== Saeco–Longoni Sport (2002–04) ===
Born in Cerro Veronese, Veneto, Cunego began cycling as a teenager after being a successful cross-country runner. He was discovered by Giuseppe Martinelli who also worked closely with Marco Pantani. Cunego turned professional in 2002 at the age of 20 with Saeco–Longoni Sport, winning the Giro d'Oro and the Giro Medio Brenta in his first season. In 2003, he won the seventh stage and the overall classification of the Tour of Qinghai Lake.

He came to prominence in May 2004, winning the Giro d'Italia at the age of 22 with Saeco. Cunego's strength came as a blow to his captain Gilberto Simoni; relations between the two during the race were strained when Cunego sprinted away from Simoni to win the 18th stage after Simoni's solo breakaway. La Gazzetta dello Sport reported that as Simoni passed by Cunego, who was surrounded by journalists, Simoni pointed his finger at Cunego and angrily said "You're a bastard...you are really stupid." During 2004 he won the Giro di Lombardia in October, his 13th victory of the season. He finished the season number one in the UCI Road World Cup, the youngest rider to achieve it, aged 23. He was also the last rider ranked first on the world ranking, because from 2005 the ranking was replaced by the UCI ProTour.

=== Lampre (2005–14) ===
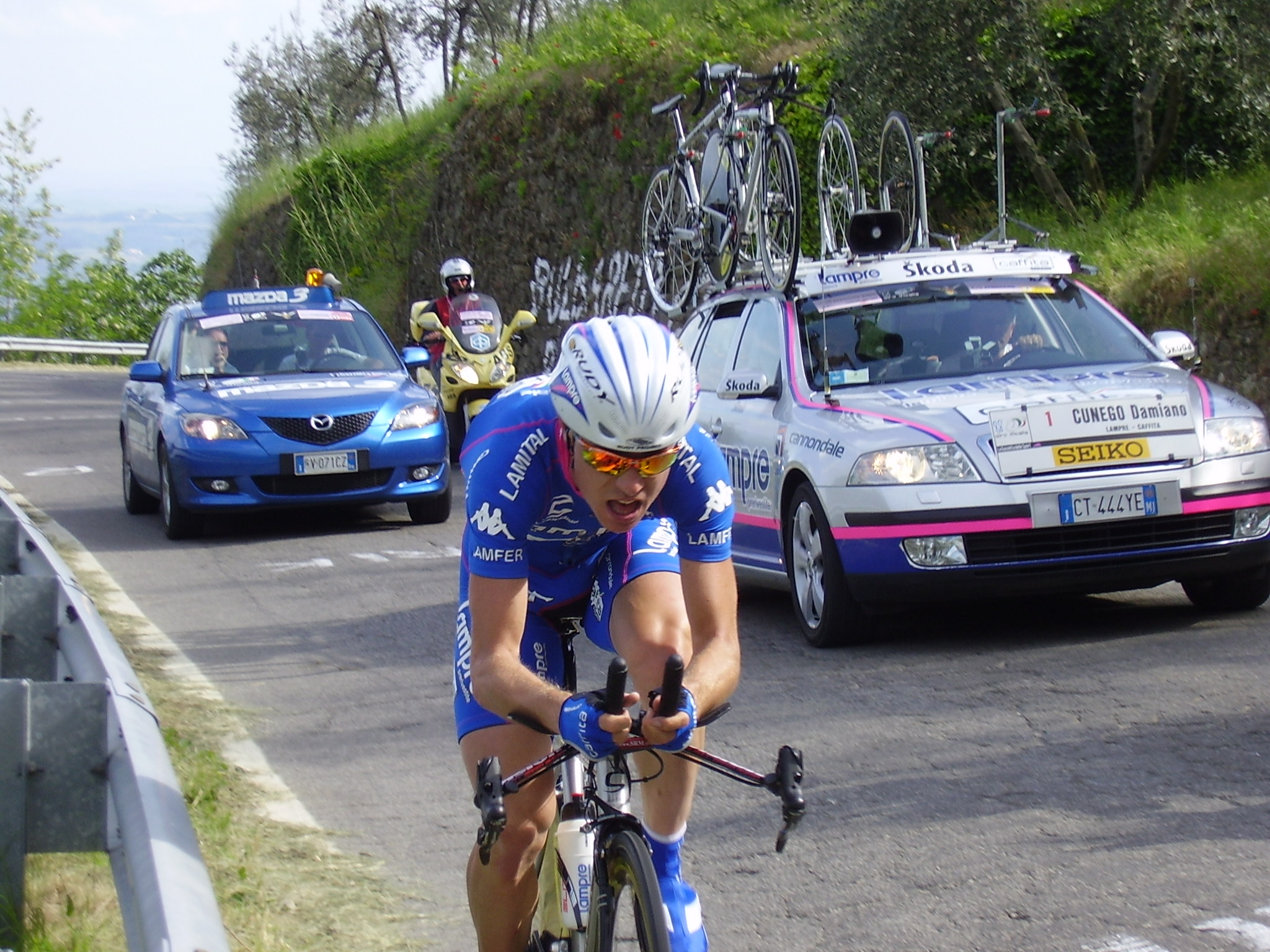
Cunego at the 2005 Giro d'Italia

In the 2005 Giro d'Italia, Simoni and Cunego were co-captains of Lampre–Caffita, but Cunego posed no threat to Simoni, as he faltered during the first climb in the Dolomites, losing six minutes in the day and any prospect of winning. At the time, his team attributed his loss to a "psychological crisis", and Cunego said, "a great weight has been lifted from me by this defeat". After the race, he was found to have Epstein–Barr virus, and he did not enter the 2005 Tour de France.

In 2006, Cunego finished third in Liège–Bastogne–Liège, losing to Alejandro Valverde and Paolo Bettini in a sprint finish. In the Tour de France Cunego was the winner of the young rider classification; he finished 2nd on stage 15 to Alpe d'Huez, after losing to Fränk Schleck, who broke away in the final 2 kilometres (1.2 miles). He also finished 3rd on stage 17, on the road to Morzine. In 2007, Cunego again won the Giro del Trentino and his second Giro di Lombardia.

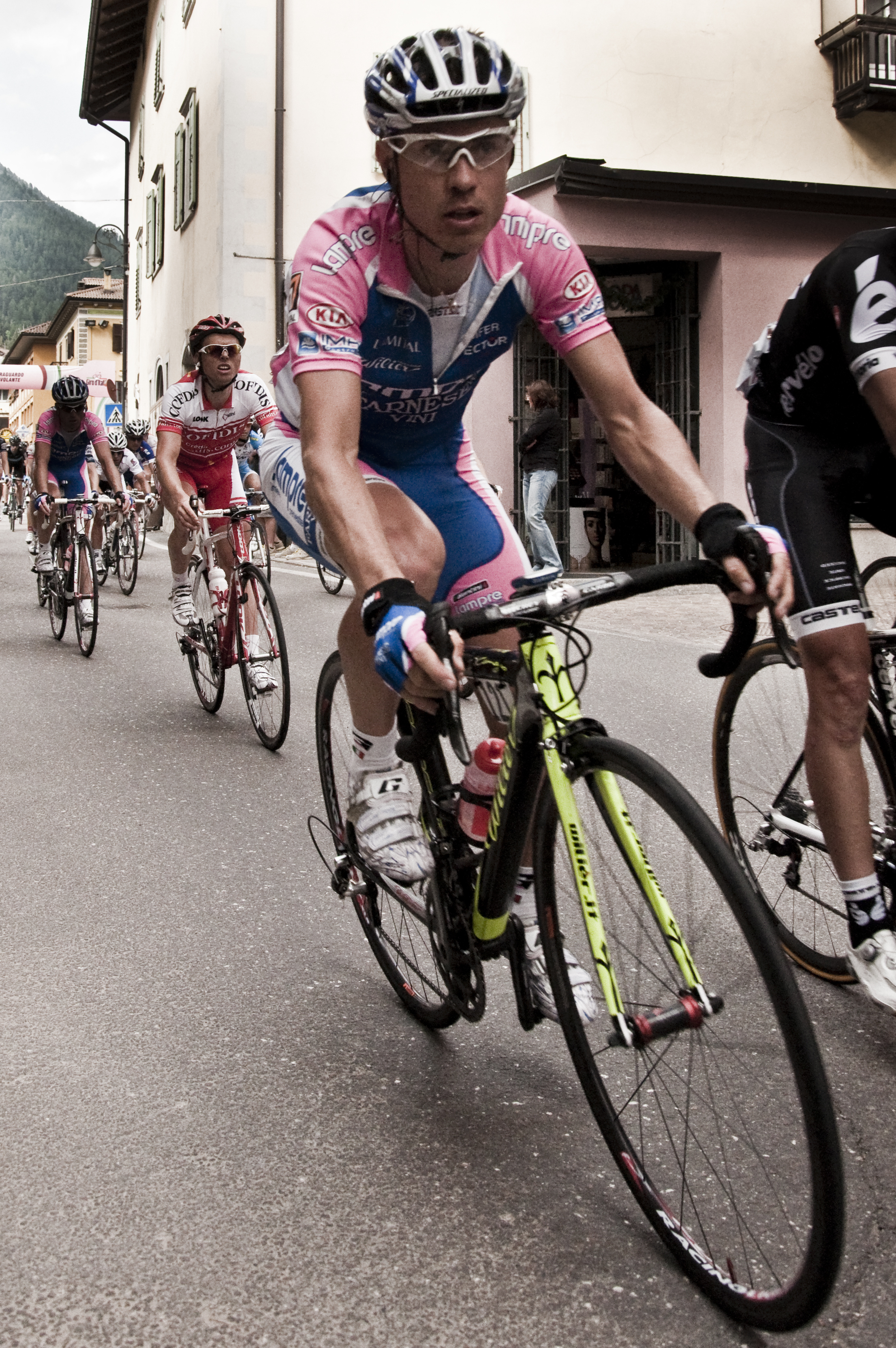
Cunego at the 2010 Giro d'Italia

In 2008 he won the Klasika Primavera and the Amstel Gold Race, with two powerful sprints against Valverde and Schleck, with victory in the latter propelling him to the top of the UCI Pro Tour rankings, as he also went on to finish second in the UCI Road World Championships. He was widely tipped to be victorious in the Tour de France, but he struggled and eventually dropped out before the finish. By the end of the year, Cunego conquered for the third time at the Giro di Lombardia and then he ended the season with victory in the Japan Cup, confirming himself as one of the best Classics specialists in the world. In 2009, he won the Settimana Internazionale di Coppi e Bartali with victories in two stages; later he won two mountain stages at Vuelta a España, which made him one of the favourites for the road race at the UCI Road World Championships. He ultimately finished that race in eighth position. In July 2013, he was one of 27 former riders and officials linked to the Lampre–Merida team indicted for doping in an Italian court, with a hearing set for 10 December 2013. In early 2014 however, details emerged that indicated that Cunego might have been one of few Lampre riders to refuse treatment by Spanish doctor José Ibarguren Taus, who was linked to doping practices.

=== Nippo–Vini Fantini (2015–18) ===
In October 2014, it was announced that Cunego was to leave Lampre–Merida to ride with Nippo–Vini Fantini in 2015.

== Post-career ==
In June 2020, Cunego was hospitalised due to ventriculitis, an infection of the cerebral ventricle.

In early 2020, Cunego was profiled in the British magazine Cyclist. He was quoted as saying that he believes the increased media attention and sponsor obligations interfered with his training and mental focus, ultimately preventing him from achieving his full potential after his 2004 Giro victory and other initial successes. He also expressed concern about the state of 2020s Italian cycling, highlighting the lack of emerging talent compared to other nations.

== Major results ==
1998
1st Overall Giro della Lunigiana
1999
1st Road race, UCI Junior Road World Championships
2nd Road race, National Junior Road Championships
2000
3rd Giro del Belvedere
8th Gran Premio Palio del Recioto
2001
2nd Gran Premio Palio del Recioto
6th Gran Premio di Poggiana
2002
1st Giro d'Oro
1st Giro del Medio Brenta
2003
1st Overall Tour of Qinghai Lake

1st Stage 7

4th Overall Brixia Tour
4th Giro dell'Appennino
6th Japan Cup
2004 (13 pro wins)
1st Overall Giro d'Italia

1st Stages 2, 7, 16 & 18
Held after Stages 2 & 3
Held after Stages 7–10 & 18

1st Overall Giro del Trentino

1st Stages 1 & 2

1st Giro di Lombardia
1st Giro dell'Appennino
1st GP Industria & Artigianato di Larciano
1st Memorial Marco Pantani
1st Gran Premio Nobili Rubinetterie
1st Gran Premio Fred Mengoni
2nd Japan Cup
4th Giro del Veneto
6th Klasika Primavera
9th Road race, UCI Road World Championships
9th Giro di Toscana
2005 (4)
1st Trofeo Melinda
1st Gran Premio Nobili Rubinetterie
1st Japan Cup
2nd Overall Tour de Romandie

1st Stage 3

2nd Klasika Primavera
3rd Overall Vuelta a Murcia
3rd Overall Settimana Internazionale di Coppi e Bartali
3rd Tre Valli Varesine
5th Overall Brixia Tour
7th Giro del Veneto
8th Gran Premio Città di Camaiore
9th Overall Tour of the Basque Country
9th Liège–Bastogne–Liège
9th Giro dell'Emilia
2006 (6)
1st Overall Settimana Internazionale di Coppi e Bartali

1st Stage 3

1st Overall Giro del Trentino

1st Stage 2

1st Giro d'Oro
1st GP Industria & Artigianato di Larciano
1st Young rider classification, Tour de France
2nd Giro del Lazio
2nd Klasika Primavera
3rd Liège–Bastogne–Liège
4th Overall Giro d'Italia
8th Overall Vuelta a Murcia
8th Clásica de Almería
2007 (6)
1st Overall Giro del Trentino

1st Stages 1 & 2

1st Giro di Lombardia
1st Gran Premio Bruno Beghelli
1st Stage 4 Deutschland Tour
4th Overall Tour of the Basque Country
5th Overall Giro d'Italia
5th Overall Tour de Suisse
5th Giro dell'Emilia
7th Overall Critérium International
7th Liège–Bastogne–Liège
9th Overall Vuelta a Murcia
2008 (5)
1st Giro di Lombardia
1st Amstel Gold Race
1st Klasika Primavera
1st Japan Cup
2nd Road race, UCI Road World Championships
2nd Memorial Marco Pantani
3rd Overall Tour of the Basque Country

1st Points classification
1st Stage 5

3rd La Flèche Wallonne
3rd Tre Valli Varesine
4th Overall Tour de Suisse
6th Giro del Lazio
10th Overall Critérium International
2009 (5)
1st Overall Settimana Internazionale di Coppi e Bartali

1st Points classification
1st Stages 2 & 3

Vuelta a España

1st Stages 8 & 14

2nd Road race, National Road Championships
3rd La Flèche Wallonne
5th Amstel Gold Race
6th Overall Tour de Suisse
6th Overall Tour of the Basque Country
6th Klasika Primavera
7th Liège–Bastogne–Liège
8th Road race, UCI Road World Championships
9th Gran Premio Bruno Beghelli
2010
5th La Flèche Wallonne
5th Tre Valli Varesine
6th Amstel Gold Race
10th Grand Prix Cycliste de Québec
2011 (3)
1st Giro dell'Appennino
1st Stage 2 Tour de Romandie
2nd Overall Tour de Suisse
3rd Overall Giro di Sardegna

1st Stage 2

3rd Montepaschi Strade Bianche
4th Japan Cup
6th Overall Tour de France
8th Overall Tirreno–Adriatico
2012 (1)
2nd Overall Giro del Trentino

1st Stage 2

2nd Gran Premio di Lugano
4th Overall Tour of the Basque Country
6th Overall Giro d'Italia
6th Overall Volta a Catalunya
2013 (1)
1st Mountains classification, Tirreno–Adriatico
2nd Overall Settimana Internazionale di Coppi e Bartali

1st Points classification
1st Stage 3

3rd Japan Cup
2014
4th Strade Bianche
4th Gran Premio di Lugano
2015
3rd Giro dell'Appennino
4th Giro dell'Emilia
5th Overall Giro del Trentino
6th Milano–Torino
8th Tre Valli Varesine
9th Volta Limburg Classic
10th Gran Premio di Lugano
2016
6th Gran Premio di Lugano
Giro d'Italia

Held after Stages 4–6 & 10–19

2017 (1)
6th Overall Tour of Qinghai Lake

1st Stage 6

=== Grand Tour general classification results timeline ===
Grand Tour general classification results
| Grand Tour | 2002 | 2003 | 2004 | 2005 | 2006 | 2007 | 2008 | 2009 | 2010 | 2011 | 2012 | 2013 | 2014 | 2015 | 2016 | 2017 | 2018 |
| Giro d'Italia | — | 34 | 1 | 18 | 4 | 5 | — | 17 | 11 | — | 6 | — | 19 | DNF | 44 | — | — |
| Tour de France | — | — | — | — | 11 | — | DNF | — | 29 | 6 | — | 55 | — | — | — | — | — |
| / Vuelta a España | — | — | 15 | — | — | DNF | DNF | DNF | — | — | 33 | — | 76 | — | — | — | — |
Major stage race general classification results
| Race | 2002 | 2003 | 2004 | 2005 | 2006 | 2007 | 2008 | 2009 | 2010 | 2011 | 2012 | 2013 | 2014 | 2015 | 2016 | 2017 | 2018 |
| / Paris–Nice | — | — | — | — | — | — | 17 | — | 48 | — | 13 | — | — | — | — | — | — |
| / Tirreno–Adriatico | — | — | — | — | — | — | — | — | — | 8 | — | 32 | 27 | — | — | — | 117 |
| Volta a Catalunya | — | — | — | — | — | — | — | — | — | — | 6 | — | — | — | — | — | — |
| Tour of the Basque Country | — | 16 | 16 | 9 | — | 4 | 4 | 6 | DNF | DNF | 4 | 16 | 11 | — | — | — | — |
| / Tour de Romandie | 70 | — | — | 2 | — | — | — | — | — | 16 | — | 27 | — | — | — | — | — |
| Critérium du Dauphiné | — | — | — | — | — | — | — | — | — | — | — | 21 | 72 | — | — | — | — |
| Tour de Suisse | — | — | — | — | — | 5 | 4 | 6 | — | 2 | 52 | — | — | — | — | — | 124 |

=== Classics results timeline ===
| Monument | 2002 | 2003 | 2004 | 2005 | 2006 | 2007 | 2008 | 2009 | 2010 | 2011 | 2012 | 2013 | 2014 | 2015 | 2016 | 2017 | 2018 |
|---|---|---|---|---|---|---|---|---|---|---|---|---|---|---|---|---|---|
| Milan–San Remo | — | — | — | — | 62 | — | — | — | 34 | — | 43 | — | — | — | — | — | — |
| Tour of Flanders | Did not contest during his career | | | | | | | | | | | | | | | | |
| Paris–Roubaix | Did not contest during his career | | | | | | | | | | | | | | | | |
| Liège–Bastogne–Liège | 124 | — | — | 9 | 3 | 7 | 30 | 7 | 20 | 16 | 35 | 30 | 13 | — | — | — | — |
| Giro di Lombardia | — | — | 1 | 29 | — | 1 | 1 | 14 | — | 27 | 13 | DNF | — | 23 | 33 | 93 | — |
| Classic | 2002 | 2003 | 2004 | 2005 | 2006 | 2007 | 2008 | 2009 | 2010 | 2011 | 2012 | 2013 | 2014 | 2015 | 2016 | 2017 | 2018 |
| Strade Bianche | Race did not exist | | | | | — | — | — | — | 3 | — | 16 | 4 | 16 | DNF | — | — |
| Amstel Gold Race | — | — | — | — | — | — | 1 | 5 | 6 | 15 | 31 | 43 | 50 | 40 | DNF | — | DNF |
| La Flèche Wallonne | 122 | — | — | 14 | — | — | 3 | 3 | 5 | 60 | — | 28 | 69 | — | — | — | — |
| Grand Prix Cycliste de Québec | Race did not exist | | | | | | | | 10 | — | — | 53 | — | — | — | — | — |
| Grand Prix Cycliste de Montréal | Race did not exist | | | | | | | | 27 | — | — | 39 | — | — | — | — | — |
| Tre Valli Varesine | — | — | — | 3 | 27 | — | 3 | — | 5 | 52 | — | 23 | DNF | 8 | 64 | 88 | — |
| Giro dell'Emilia | — | 28 | — | 9 | — | 5 | 13 | 14 | — | — | 15 | 18 | DNF | 4 | 53 | 33 | — |
| Milano–Torino | — | 55 | 32 | — | — | — | Not held | | | | 26 | 38 | — | 6 | 20 | 72 | — |

=== Major championships results timeline ===
| | 2002 | 2003 | 2004 | 2005 | 2006 | 2007 | 2008 | 2009 | 2010 | 2011 | 2012 | 2013 | 2014 | 2015 | 2016 | 2017 | 2018 |
|---|---|---|---|---|---|---|---|---|---|---|---|---|---|---|---|---|---|
| Olympic Games | Not held | | — | Not held | | | — | Not held | | | — | Not held | | | — | Not held | |
| World Championships | — | — | 9 | — | — | 50 | 2 | 8 | — | — | — | — | — | — | — | — | — |
| National Championships | — | — | — | — | — | 31 | 12 | 2 | 16 | DNF | DNF | 28 | — | — | DNF | DNF | DNF |

Legend
| — | Did not compete |
| DNF | Did not finish |
