= Ennio Salvador =

Italian cyclist (born 1960)

Personal information
- Full name: Ennio Salvador
- Born: 19 July 1960 (age 66) Cordignano, Italy

Cycling career
- Sport: Cycling
- Role: Rider

Ennio Salvador (born 19 July 1960) is a former Italian racing cyclist. He finished in last place in the 1986 Tour de France.

== Major results ==
1981
1st Stage 7 Giro Ciclistico d'Italia
2nd GP Palio del Recioto
1982
3rd Trofeo Matteotti
3rd Giro del Friuli
8th Tre Valli Varesine
9th Overall Deutschland Tour
1983
1st GP Montelupo
6th Overall Giro del Trentino
1984
1st GP Montelupo
2nd Millemetri del Corso di Mestre
3rd Giro del Friuli
1985
3rd Giro della Provincia di Reggio Calabria
4th Overall Giro del Trentino
1986
4th Giro di Toscana
1987
5th Giro di Lombardia
1988
1st Trofeo Matteotti
7th Giro dell'Umbria
1989
8th Giro dell'Emilia
