= Paride Grillo =

Italian cyclist

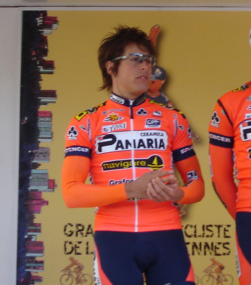

Personal information
- Full name: Paride Grillo
- Born: 23 March 1982 (age 44) Varese, Italy

Cycling career
- Sport: Cycling
- Discipline: Road
- Role: Rider
- Rider type: Sprinter

Professional teams
- 2005–2008: Ceramica Panaria–Navigare
- 2010: Carmiooro NGC

Paride Grillo (born 23 March 1982, in Varese) is an Italian former professional road bicycle racer. He rode in two editions of the Giro d'Italia, and finished 2nd on stage 12 of the 2005 edition.

== Major results ==
2002
2nd Trofeo Franco Balestra
5th Circuito del Porto
2003
1st Trofeo Pina e Mario Bazzigallupi
6th Circuito del Porto
6th Gran Premio della Liberazione
2004
1st Trofeo Franco Balestra
3rd Circuito del Porto
2005
1st Stage 5 Circuit de Lorraine
1st Stage 4 Post Danmark Rundt
2nd Gran Premio Città di Misano – Adriatico
2nd Memorial Cimurri
2nd Giro della Provincia di Lucca
3rd Giro del Piemonte
3rd Gran Premio Bruno Beghelli
4th GP Costa degli Etruschi
4th Giro di Romagna
8th Overall Tour Down Under
2006
1st GP de la Ville de Rennes
1st Stage 2a Circuit Cycliste de la Sarthe
1st Stage 4 Brixia Tour
3rd Gran Premio Città di Misano – Adriatico
4th Giro della Provincia di Lucca
9th Giro del Piemonte
2007
1st Stage 2 Circuit Cycliste de la Sarthe
1st Stages 1 & 7 Volta a Portugal
2nd Gran Premio Città di Misano – Adriatico
2nd Coppa Bernocchi
2008
6th Giro di Toscana
