= 1992 Giro del Trentino =

Race details
- Dates: 12–15 May 1992
- Stages: 4
- Distance: 713 km (443.0 mi)
- Winning time: 19h 35' 19"

Results
	Winner	Claudio Chiappucci (ITA)
	Second	Roberto Conti (ITA)
	Third	Zenon Jaskuła (POL)

The 1992 Giro del Trentino was the 16th edition of the Tour of the Alps cycle race and was held on 12 May to 15 May 1992. The race started in Arco and finished in Riva del Garda. The race was won by Claudio Chiappucci.

== General classification ==
Final general classification

Rank	Rider	Time
1	Claudio Chiappucci (ITA)	19h 35' 19"
2	Roberto Conti (ITA)	+ 35"
3	Zenon Jaskuła (POL)	+ 1' 47"
4	Paolo Botarelli (ITA)	+ 2' 07"
5	Stefano Della Santa (ITA)	+ 2' 24"
6	Leonardo Sierra (VEN)	+ 2' 26"
7	Rodolfo Massi (ITA)	+ 3' 17"
8	Gianni Faresin (ITA)	+ 3' 45"
9	Fabrizio Settembrini (ITA)	+ 4' 03"
10	Luc Roosen (BEL)	+ 4' 31"
