= 1983 Giro del Trentino =

Race details
- Dates: 2–5 May 1983
- Stages: 3 + Prologue
- Distance: 619.5 km (384.9 mi)
- Winning time: 16h 17' 31"

Results
	Winner	Francesco Moser (ITA)
	Second	Bruno Leali (ITA)
	Third	Emanuele Bombini (ITA)

The 1983 Giro del Trentino was the seventh edition of the Tour of the Alps cycle race and was held on 2 May to 5 May 1983. The race started in Folgaria and finished in Trento. The race was won by Francesco Moser.

== General classification ==
Final general classification

Rank	Rider	Time
1	Francesco Moser (ITA)	16h 17' 31"
2	Bruno Leali (ITA)	+ 8"
3	Emanuele Bombini (ITA)	+ 9"
4	Riccardo Magrini (ITA)	+ 19"
5	Alfio Vandi (ITA)	+ 20"
6	Ennio Salvador (ITA)	+ 28"
7	Sergio Santimaria (ITA)	+ 33"
8	Claudio Savini (ITA)	+ 35"
9	Wladimiro Panizza (ITA)	+ 39"
10	Franco Chioccioli (ITA)	+ 1' 00"
