= 2000 Giro del Trentino =

Race details
- Dates: 24–27 April 2000
- Stages: 4
- Distance: 609.3 km (378.6 mi)
- Winning time: 15h 31' 02"

Results
	Winner	Simone Borgheresi (ITA)
	Second	Niklas Axelsson (SWE)
	Third	Paolo Savoldelli (ITA)

The 2000 Giro del Trentino was the 24th edition of the Tour of the Alps cycle race and was held on 24 April to 27 April 2000. The race started in Sillian and finished in Arco di Trento. The race was won by Simone Borgheresi.

== General classification ==
Final general classification

Rank	Rider	Time
1	Simone Borgheresi (ITA)	15h 31' 02"
2	Niklas Axelsson (SWE)	+ 23"
3	Paolo Savoldelli (ITA)	+ 28"
4	Unai Osa (ESP)	+ 46"
5	Andrea Noè (ITA)	+ 1' 05"
6	Roberto Sgambelluri (ITA)	+ 1' 11"
7	Gilberto Simoni (ITA)	+ 1' 11"
8	Pietro Caucchioli (ITA)	+ 1' 11"
9	Igor González de Galdeano (ESP)	+ 1' 12"
10	Tomasz Brożyna (POL)	+ 1' 13"
