= 2007 Giro del Trentino =

Race details
- Dates: 24–27 April 2007
- Stages: 4
- Distance: 647.8 km (402.5 mi)
- Winning time: 16h 22' 20"

Results
	Winner	Damiano Cunego (ITA)
	Second	Michele Scarponi (ITA)
	Third	Luca Mazzanti (ITA)

The 2007 Giro del Trentino was the 31st edition of the Tour of the Alps cycle race and was held on 24 April to 27 April 2007. The race started and finished in Arco. The race was won by Damiano Cunego.

== General classification ==
Final general classification

Rank	Rider	Time
1	Damiano Cunego (ITA)	16h 22' 20"
2	Michele Scarponi (ITA)	+ 18"
3	Luca Mazzanti (ITA)	+ 40"
4	Thomas Rohregger (AUT)	+ 42"
5	Franco Pellizotti (ITA)	+ 45"
6	Fortunato Baliani (ITA)	+ 54"
7	Andrea Noè (ITA)	+ 1' 12"
8	Vincenzo Nibali (ITA)	+ 1' 12"
9	Yauhen Sobal (BLR)	+ 1' 17"
10	Massimo Giunti (ITA)	+ 1' 28"
