= Simone Borgheresi =

Italian cyclist

Personal information
- Born: 1 August 1968 (age 58) Greve in Chianti, Italy

Cycling career
- Sport: Cycling
- Current team: Retired
- Discipline: Road
- Role: Rider

Professional teams
- 1992-1995: Amore & Vita
- 1996: Mapei
- 1997-2002: Mercatone Uno

Simone Borgheresi (born 1 August 1968 in Greve in Chianti) is a former Italian racing cyclist.

== Major results ==
1995
1st stage 4 Vuelta a Aragón
8th Tirreno–Adriatico
1997
3rd Trofeo Pantalica
2nd Trofeo dello Scalatore
1998
1st Subida a Urkiola
1999
1st Giro dell'Appennino
2000
1st Giro del Trentino

1st stage 1
