= 1997 Giro del Trentino =

Race details
- Dates: 28 April–1 May 1997
- Stages: 4
- Distance: 641 km (398.3 mi)
- Winning time: 16h 42' 12"

Results
	Winner	Luc Leblanc (FRA)
	Second	Pavel Tonkov (RUS)
	Third	Leonardo Piepoli (ITA)

The 1997 Giro del Trentino was the 21st edition of the Tour of the Alps cycle race and was held on 28 April to 1 May 1997. The race started in Riva del Garda and finished in Lienz. The race was won by Luc Leblanc.

== General classification ==
Final general classification

Rank	Rider	Time
1	Luc Leblanc (FRA)	16h 42' 12"
2	Pavel Tonkov (RUS)	+ 7"
3	Leonardo Piepoli (ITA)	+ 39"
4	Ivan Gotti (ITA)	+ 41"
5	Filippo Simeoni (ITA)	+ 53"
6	Wladimir Belli (ITA)	+ 1' 04"
7	Gilberto Simoni (ITA)	+ 1' 06"
8	Fausto Dotti (ITA)	+ 1' 40"
9	Gianni Faresin (ITA)	+ 1' 49"
10	Felice Puttini (SUI)	+ 2' 04"
