= 2004 Giro di Lombardia =

Race details
- Dates: 16 October 2004
- Stages: 1
- Distance: 246 km (152.9 mi)
- Winning time: 6h 17' 55"

Results
	Winner	Damiano Cunego (ITA)	(Saeco)
	Second	Michael Boogerd (NED)	(Rabobank)
	Third	Ivan Basso (ITA)	(Team CSC)

The 2004 Giro di Lombardia was the 98th edition of the Giro di Lombardia cycle race and was held on 16 October 2004. The race started in Mendrisio and finished in Bergamo. The race was won by Damiano Cunego of the Saeco team.

== General classification ==
Final general classification

Rank	Rider	Team	Time
1	Damiano Cunego (ITA)	Saeco	6h 17' 55"
2	Michael Boogerd (NED)	Rabobank	+ 0"
3	Ivan Basso (ITA)	Team CSC	+ 0"
4	Cadel Evans (AUS)	T-Mobile Team	+ 0"
5	Daniele Nardello (ITA)	T-Mobile Team	+ 2"
6	Marzio Bruseghin (ITA)	Fassa Bortolo	+ 17"
7	Eddy Mazzoleni (ITA)	Saeco	+ 17"
8	Dario Frigo (ITA)	Fassa Bortolo	+ 17"
9	Franco Pellizotti (ITA)	Alessio–Bianchi	+ 17"
10	Luca Mazzanti (ITA)	Ceramica Panaria–Margres	+ 17"
