= 1991 Giro del Trentino =

Race details
- Dates: 14–17 May 1991
- Stages: 4
- Distance: 714 km (443.7 mi)
- Winning time: 18h 31' 49"

Results
	Winner	Leonardo Sierra (VEN)
	Second	Massimiliano Lelli (ITA)
	Third	Stephen Hodge (AUS)

The 1991 Giro del Trentino was the 15th edition of the Tour of the Alps cycle race and was held on 14 May to 17 May 1991. The race started in Riva del Garda and finished in Arco. The race was won by Leonardo Sierra.

== General classification ==
Final general classification

Rank	Rider	Time
1	Leonardo Sierra (VEN)	18h 31' 49"
2	Massimiliano Lelli (ITA)	+ 26"
3	Stephen Hodge (AUS)	+ 30"
4	Claudio Chiappucci (ITA)	+ 31"
5	Gianni Bugno (ITA)	+ 32"
6	Jan Nevens (BEL)	+ 32"
7	Pascal Simon (FRA)	+ 40"
8	Franco Chioccioli (ITA)	+ 41"
9	Fabian Fuchs (SUI)	+ 42"
10	Andrew Hampsten (USA)	+ 44"
