= 2004 Giro del Trentino =

Race details
- Dates: 20–23 April 2004
- Stages: 4
- Distance: 673.3 km (418.4 mi)
- Winning time: 17h 31' 03"

Results
	Winner	Damiano Cunego (ITA)
	Second	Jure Golčer (SLO)
	Third	Gilberto Simoni (ITA)

The 2004 Giro del Trentino was the 28th edition of the Tour of the Alps cycle race and was held on 20 April to 23 April 2004. The race started and finished in Arco. The race was won by Damiano Cunego.

== General classification ==
Final general classification

Rank	Rider	Time
1	Damiano Cunego (ITA)	17h 31' 03"
2	Jure Golčer (SLO)	+ 49"
3	Gilberto Simoni (ITA)	+ 53"
4	Giuliano Figueras (ITA)	+ 55"
5	Pavel Tonkov (RUS)	+ 1' 06"
6	Gerhard Trampusch (AUT)	+ 1' 25"
7	Luca Mazzanti (ITA)	+ 2' 55"
8	Juan Miguel Mercado (ESP)	+ 3' 02"
9	Giuseppe Di Grande (ITA)	+ 3' 08"
10	Kyrylo Pospyeyev (UKR)	+ 3' 10"
