= 1999 Giro del Trentino =

Race details
- Dates: 26–29 April 1999
- Stages: 4
- Distance: 697 km (433.1 mi)
- Winning time: 18h 18' 49"

Results
	Winner	Paolo Savoldelli (ITA)
	Second	Gilberto Simoni (ITA)
	Third	Marco Pantani (ITA)

The 1999 Giro del Trentino was the 23rd edition of the Tour of the Alps cycle race and was held on 26 April to 29 April 1999. The race started in Lienz and finished in Arco. The race was won by Paolo Savoldelli.

== General classification ==
Final general classification

Rank	Rider	Time
1	Paolo Savoldelli (ITA)	18h 18' 49"
2	Gilberto Simoni (ITA)	+ 7"
3	Marco Pantani (ITA)	+ 7"
4	Daniel Clavero (ESP)	+ 9"
5	Roberto Sgambelluri (ITA)	+ 10"
6	Ivan Gotti (ITA)	+ 10"
7	Timothy Jones (ZIM)	+ 10"
8	Massimo Podenzana (ITA)	+ 10"
9	Hernán Buenahora (COL)	+ 10"
10	Nicola Miceli (ITA)	+ 34"
