= 2011 Montepaschi Strade Bianche =

Race details
- Dates: 5 March
- Stages: 1
- Distance: 190 km (120 mi)
- Winning time: 4h 44' 26"

Results
	Winner	Philippe Gilbert (BEL)	(Omega Pharma–Lotto)
	Second	Alessandro Ballan (ITA)	(BMC Racing Team)
	Third	Damiano Cunego (ITA)	(Lampre–ISD)

The 2011 Montepaschi Strade Bianche took place on 5 March 2011. The race was 190 km (120 mi). It was the 5th edition of the international classic Montepaschi Strade Bianche.

== Results ==
	Cyclist	Team	Time
1	Philippe Gilbert (BEL)	Omega Pharma–Lotto	4h 44' 26"
2	Alessandro Ballan (ITA)	BMC Racing Team	s.t.
3	Damiano Cunego (ITA)	Lampre–ISD	s.t.
4	Jure Kocjan (SLO)	Team Type 1	s.t.
5	Fabian Cancellara (SWI)	Leopard Trek	s.t.
6	Ángel Vicioso (ESP)	Androni Giocattoli	s.t.
7	Oscar Gatto (ITA)	Farnese Vini–Neri Sottoli	s.t.
8	Giovanni Visconti (ITA)	Farnese Vini–Neri Sottoli	s.t.
9	Greg van Avermaet (BEL)	BMC Racing Team	s.t.
10	Fabian Wegmann (GER)	Leopard Trek	s.t.
