= 2009 Giro del Trentino =

Race details
- Dates: 22–25 April 2009
- Stages: 4
- Distance: 522.3 km (324.5 mi)
- Winning time: 13h 17' 50"

Results
	Winner	Ivan Basso (ITA)
	Second	Janez Brajkovič (SLO)
	Third	Przemysław Niemiec (POL)

The 2009 Giro del Trentino was the 33rd edition of the Tour of the Alps cycle race and was held on 22 April to 25 April 2009. The race started in Torbole and finished in Pejo Fonti. The race was won by Ivan Basso.

== General classification ==
Final general classification

Rank	Rider	Time
1	Ivan Basso (ITA)	13h 17' 50"
2	Janez Brajkovič (SLO)	+ 22"
3	Przemysław Niemiec (POL)	+ 33"
4	Stefano Garzelli (ITA)	+ 55"
5	Domenico Pozzovivo (ITA)	+ 1' 08"
6	Gilberto Simoni (ITA)	+ 1' 14"
7	Giampaolo Caruso (ITA)	+ 1' 18"
8	Danilo Di Luca (ITA)	+ 1' 49"
9	Pietro Caucchioli (ITA)	+ 1' 55"
10	Jackson Rodríguez (VEN)	+ 2' 02"
