= 2008 Giro di Lombardia =

Race details
- Dates: 18 October 2008
- Stages: 1
- Distance: 242 km (150.4 mi)
- Winning time: 5h 37' 04"

Results
	Winner	Damiano Cunego (ITA)	(Lampre)
	Second	Janez Brajkovič (SLO)	(Astana)
	Third	Rigoberto Urán (COL)	(Caisse d'Epargne)

The 2008 route of Giro di Lombardia

The 2008 Giro di Lombardia was the 102nd edition of this single-day road bicycle racing monument race. The event took place on 18 October 2008, with Damiano Cunego winning it, his fourth victory of the year, and the third of his career in the Giro di Lombardia and his second consecutive victory. Cunego managed to break away from the peloton with 15 kilometres on the descent of the Civiglio and was able to resist the chase of the peloton to win alone on the waterfront of Como. Janez Brajkovič of Astana finished 24 seconds behind, followed by Rigoberto Urán of Caisse d'Epargne.

== General standings ==
18 October 2008, 242 km

	Cyclist	Team	Time
1	Damiano Cunego (ITA)	Lampre	5h 37' 04"
2	Janez Brajkovič (SLO)	Astana	+ 24"
3	Rigoberto Urán (COL)	Caisse d'Epargne	+ 24"
4	Giovanni Visconti (ITA)	Quick-Step	+ 33"
5	Karsten Kroon (NED)	CSC–Saxo Bank	+ 33"
6	Mauro Finetto (ITA)	CSF Group–Navigare	+ 33"
7	Christopher Horner (USA)	Astana	+ 33"
8	Stefano Garzelli (ITA)	Acqua & Sapone–Caffè Mokambo	+ 33"
9	Morris Possoni (ITA)	Team Columbia	+ 33"
10	Francesco Failli (ITA)	Acqua & Sapone–Caffè Mokambo	+ 33"

== See also ==
2008 in Road Cycling
