= 2008 La Flèche Wallonne =

Race details
- Dates: April 23
- Stages: 1
- Distance: 199.5 km (124.0 mi)
- Winning time: 4h 35' 29"

Results
	Winner	Kim Kirchen (LUX)	(Team High Road)
	Second	Cadel Evans (AUS)	(Silence–Lotto)
	Third	Damiano Cunego (ITA)	(Lampre)

The 2008 La Flèche Wallonne cycling race took place on April 23, 2008, and was won by Luxembourger Kim Kirchen of Team High Road. It was the 72nd running of the La Flèche Wallonne and covered 199.5 kilometres (124.0 mi) between Charleroi and Huy in Belgium in 4 hours, 35 minutes and 20 seconds. Australian Cadel Evans of Silence–Lotto and Italian Damiano Cunego of Lampre came second and third respectively.

== Results ==
	Cyclist	Team	Time
1	Kim Kirchen (LUX)	Team High Road	4h 35' 29"
2	Cadel Evans (AUS)	Silence–Lotto	+ 0' 01"
3	Damiano Cunego (ITA)	Lampre	+ 0' 02"
4	Robert Gesink (NED)	Rabobank	s.t.
5	~~Thomas Dekker (NED)~~	~~Rabobank~~	s.t.
6	Davide Rebellin (ITA)	Gerolsteiner	s.t.
7	Michael Albasini (CH)	Liquigas	+ 0' 08"
8	Joaquim Rodríguez (ESP)	Caisse d'Epargne	+ 0' 10"
9	Christian Pfannberger (AUT)	Barloworld	+ 0' 15"
10	John Gadret (FRA)	Ag2r–La Mondiale	+ 0' 20"
