= 2010 Giro del Trentino =

Race details
- Dates: 20–23 April 2010
- Stages: 4
- Distance: 494.9 km (307.5 mi)
- Winning time: 13h 50' 23"

Results
	Winner	Alexander Vinokourov (KAZ)
	Second	Riccardo Riccò (ITA)
	Third	Domenico Pozzovivo (ITA)

The 2010 Giro del Trentino was the 34th edition of the Tour of the Alps cycle race and was held on 20 April to 23 April 2010. The race started in Riva del Garda and finished in Arco. The race was won by Alexander Vinokourov.

== General classification ==
Final general classification

Rank	Rider	Time
1	Alexander Vinokourov (KAZ)	13h 50' 23"
2	Riccardo Riccò (ITA)	+ 0"
3	Domenico Pozzovivo (ITA)	+ 42"
4	Michele Scarponi (ITA)	+ 44"
5	Ivan Basso (ITA)	+ 56"
6	Sergio Pardilla (ESP)	+ 1' 28"
7	José Serpa (COL)	+ 1' 37"
8	Vladimir Miholjević (CRO)	+ 1' 41"
9	Evgeni Petrov (RUS)	+ 1' 51"
10	Damiano Caruso (ITA)	+ 1' 59"
