= 2010 La Flèche Wallonne =

2010 UCI World Ranking, race 11 of 26

Race details
- Dates: 21 April
- Stages: 1
- Distance: 198 km (123.0 mi)
- Winning time: 4h 29' 24"

Results
	Winner	Cadel Evans (AUS)	(BMC Racing Team)
	Second	Joaquim Rodríguez (ESP)	(Team Katusha)
	Third	Alberto Contador (ESP)	(Astana)

The 2010 La Flèche Wallonne cycling race took place on 21 April 2010. It was the 74th running of the La Flèche Wallonne between Charleroi and Huy in Belgium. It was won by the World Champion Cadel Evans.

== Teams ==
There were 25 teams for the 2010 La Flèche Wallonne. They were:

- Acqua & Sapone
- Ag2r–La Mondiale
- Androni Giocattoli
- Astana
- Bbox Bouygues Telecom
- BMC Racing Team
- Caisse d'Epargne
- Cervélo TestTeam
- Cofidis
- Euskaltel–Euskadi
- Française des Jeux
- Garmin–Transitions
- Lampre–Farnese Vini
- Landbouwkrediet
- Liquigas–Doimo
- Omega Pharma–Lotto
- Quick-Step
- Rabobank
- Team HTC–Columbia
- Team Katusha
- Team Milram
- Team RadioShack
- Team Saxo Bank
- Team Sky
- Topsport Vlaanderen–Mercator

== Result ==
	Cyclist	Team	Time
1	Cadel Evans (AUS)	BMC Racing Team	4h 29' 24"
2	Joaquim Rodríguez (ESP)	Team Katusha	s.t.
3	Alberto Contador (ESP)	Astana	s.t.
4	Igor Antón (ESP)	Euskaltel–Euskadi	+06"
5	Damiano Cunego (ITA)	Lampre–Farnese Vini	+09"
6	Philippe Gilbert (BEL)	Omega Pharma–Lotto	+11"
7	Chris Horner (USA)	Team RadioShack	+11"
8	Andy Schleck (LUX) †	Team Saxo Bank	+11"
9	Ryder Hesjedal (CAN) †	Garmin–Transitions	+11"
10	Michael Albasini (SUI) †	Team HTC–Columbia	+11"

†: Alejandro Valverde finished 8th, but his results during 2010 were expunged as part of the terms of his suspension for involvement in the 2006 Operación Puerto doping case,
