= 2007 Giro di Lombardia =

Race details
- Dates: 20 October 2007
- Stages: 1
- Distance: 242 km (150 mi)
- Winning time: 5h 52' 48"

Results
	Winner	Damiano Cunego (ITA)	(Lampre–Fondital)
	Second	Riccardo Riccò (ITA)	(Saunier Duval–Prodir)
	Third	Samuel Sánchez (ESP)	(Euskaltel–Euskadi)

The 2007 Giro di Lombardia is the 101st edition of this single day road bicycle racing monument race. The 242 km event took place on 20 October 2007 and was won by Damiano Cunego, the Italian rider for Lampre–Fondital in 5 hours, 52 minutes 48 seconds at an average speed of 41.16 km/h.

== General standings ==
20 October 2007, 242 km

	Cyclist	Team	Time	UCI ProTour Points
1	Damiano Cunego (ITA)	Lampre–Fondital	5h 52'48"	50
2	Riccardo Riccò (ITA)	Saunier Duval–Prodir	s.t.	40
3	Samuel Sánchez (ESP)	Euskaltel–Euskadi	+ 10"	35
4	Andy Schleck (LUX)	Team CSC	+ 10"	30
5	Davide Rebellin (ITA)	Gerolsteiner	+ 10"	25
6	Cadel Evans (AUS)	Predictor–Lotto	+ 10"	20
7	Luca Mazzanti (ITA)	Ceramica Panaria–Navigare	+ 10"	NA
8	Thomas Dekker (NED)	Rabobank	+ 10"	10
9	Giovanni Visconti (ITA)	Quick-Step–Innergetic	+ 16"	5
10	Chris Horner (USA)	Predictor–Lotto	+ 16"	2
