= 2005 Liège–Bastogne–Liège =

2005 UCI ProTour, race 10 of 28

Race details
- Dates: 24 April 2005
- Stages: 1
- Distance: 260 km (160 mi)
- Winning time: 6h 29' 09"

Results
	Winner	Alexander Vinokourov (KAZ)	(T-Mobile Team)
	Second	Jens Voigt (GER)	(Team CSC)
	Third	Michael Boogerd (NED)	(Rabobank)

The 2005 Liège–Bastogne–Liège was the 91st edition of the Liège–Bastogne–Liège, one of the five monuments of cycling. Alexander Vinokourov was able to beat Jens Voigt after they had broken away from the pack 72 km from the end. Michael Boogerd took the last spot on the podium after countering an attack from Cadel Evans on the final climb of the day.

== Results ==
	Cyclist	Team	Time
1	Alexander Vinokourov (KAZ)	T-Mobile Team	6h 29'09"
2	Jens Voigt (GER)	Team CSC	s.t.
3	Michael Boogerd (NED)	Rabobank	+ 14"
4	Paolo Bettini (ITA)	Quick-Step–Innergetic	+ 24"
5	Cadel Evans (AUS)	Davitamon–Lotto	s.t.
6	David Etxebarría (ESP)	Liberty Seguros–Würth	+ 27"
7	Miguel Ángel Martín Perdiguero (ESP)	Phonak	+ 28"
8	Mirko Celestino (ITA)	Domina Vacanze	s.t.
9	Damiano Cunego (ITA)	Lampre–Caffita	s.t.
10	Ángel Vicioso (ESP)	Liberty Seguros–Würth	s.t.
