= 2005 Tour of the Basque Country =

Race details
- Dates: 4–8 April 2005
- Stages: 5
- Distance: 743.3 km (461.9 mi)
- Winning time: 18h 13' 53"

Results
	Winner	Danilo Di Luca (ITA)	(Liquigas–Bianchi)
	Second	Davide Rebellin (ITA)	(Gerolsteiner)
	Third	Alberto Contador (ESP)	(Liberty Seguros–Würth)

The 2005 Tour of the Basque Country was the 45th edition of the Tour of the Basque Country cycle race and was held from 4 April to 8 April 2005. The race started in Zarautz and finished with an individual time trial in Oñati. The race was won by Danilo Di Luca of the Liquigas–Bianchi team.

== Stages ==
=== Stage 1 ===
4 April 2005 - Zarautz, 133 km (83 mi)

	Cyclist	Team	Time
1	Danilo Di Luca (ITA)	Liquigas–Bianchi	3h 10' 51"
2	Miguel Ángel Martín Perdiguero (ESP)	Phonak	s.t.
3	Alejandro Valverde (ESP)	Illes Balears–Caisse d'Epargne	s.t.

=== Stage 2 ===
5 April 2005 - Zarautz to Trapagaran, 166 km (103 mi)

	Cyclist	Team	Time
1	David Moncoutié (FRA)	Cofidis	3h 52' 56"
2	Aitor Osa (ESP)	Illes Balears–Caisse d'Epargne	+ 1"
3	Davide Rebellin (ITA)	Gerolsteiner	+ 3"

=== Stage 3 ===
6 April 2005 - Ortuella to Gasteiz, 176 km (109 mi)

	Cyclist	Team	Time
1	Alejandro Valverde (ESP)	Illes Balears–Caisse d'Epargne	4h 19' 09"
2	Giovanni Lombardi (ITA)	Team CSC	s.t.
3	Björn Leukemans (BEL)	Davitamon–Lotto	s.t.

=== Stage 4 ===
7 April 2005 - Gasteiz to Alsasua, 167 km (104 mi)

	Cyclist	Team	Time
1	Alejandro Valverde (ESP)	Illes Balears–Caisse d'Epargne	4h 12' 05"
2	Danilo Di Luca (ITA)	Liquigas–Bianchi	s.t.
3	Miguel Ángel Martín Perdiguero (ESP)	Phonak	s.t.

=== Stage 5a ===
8 April 2005 - Alsasua to Arantzazu, 93 km (58 mi)

	Cyclist	Team	Time
1	Jens Voigt (GER)	Team CSC	2h 23' 24"
2	David Blanco (ESP)	Comunidad Valenciana–Elche	+ 1' 15"
3	Danilo Di Luca (ITA)	Liquigas–Bianchi	+ 1' 34"

=== Stage 5b ===
8 April 2005 - Oñati, 9.3 km (5.8 mi) (ITT)

	Cyclist	Team	Time
1	Alberto Contador (ESP)	Liberty Seguros–Würth	13' 43"
2	Bobby Julich (USA)	Team CSC	+ 5"
3	Davide Rebellin (ITA)	Gerolsteiner	+ 8"

== General standings ==
	Cyclist	Team	Time
1	Danilo Di Luca (ITA)	Liquigas–Bianchi	18h 13' 53"
2	Davide Rebellin (ITA)	Gerolsteiner	+ 3"
3	Alberto Contador (ESP)	Liberty Seguros–Würth	+ 11"
4	Aitor Osa (ESP)	Illes Balears–Caisse d'Epargne	+ 14"
5	Bobby Julich (USA)	Team CSC	+ 18"
6	Óscar Pereiro (ESP)	Phonak	+ 24"
7	Michael Boogerd (NED)	Rabobank	+ 25"
8	Michael Rogers (AUS)	Quick-Step–Innergetic	+ 26"
9	Damiano Cunego (ITA)	Lampre–Caffita	+ 27"
10	Ricardo Serrano (ESP)	Kaiku	+ 29"

== Mountains classification ==
	Cyclist	Team
1	David Latasa (ESP)	Comunidad Valenciana–Elche

== Points classification ==
	Cyclist	Team
1	Alberto Contador (ESP)	Liberty Seguros–Würth

== Best team ==
	Team	Country
1	Liberty Seguros–Würth	Spain
