= 2008 Amstel Gold Race =

Dutch cycling race

2008 UCI ProTour, race 5 of 15

Race details
- Dates: April 20
- Stages: 1
- Distance: 257.4 km (159.9 mi)
- Winning time: 6 h

Results
	Winner	Damiano Cunego (ITA)	(Lampre)
	Second	Fränk Schleck (LUX)	(Team CSC)
	Third	Alejandro Valverde (ESP)	(Caisse d'Epargne)

The 2008 Amstel Gold Race is the 43rd edition of the Amstel Gold Race classic cycle race and took place on April 20, 2008. It was held on a 257.4 kilometres (159.9 mi) course from Maastricht to Cauberg as the fifth event of the 2008 UCI ProTour. Italian rider Damiano Cunego of Lampre won the event after sprinting past Luxembourger Fränk Schleck of Team CSC in the final 200 metres. Spanish rider Alejandro Valverde of Caisse d'Epargne finished third.

== Result ==
	Rider	Team	Time	UCI ProTour Points
1	Damiano Cunego (ITA)	Lampre	6h 35' 29"	40
2	Fränk Schleck (LUX)	Team CSC	s.t.	30
3	Alejandro Valverde (ESP)	Caisse d'Epargne	+ 2"	25
4	Davide Rebellin (ITA)	Gerolsteiner	+ 2"	20
5	~~Thomas Dekker (NED)~~	~~Rabobank~~	+ 6"	15
6	Christian Pfannberger (AUT)	Barloworld	+ 14"	N/A
7	Serguei Ivanov (RUS)	Astana	+ 18"	7
8	Joaquim Rodríguez (ESP)	Caisse d'Epargne	+ 23"	5
9	Karsten Kroon (NED)	Team CSC	+ 27"	3
10	Jérôme Pineau (FRA)	Bouygues Télécom	+ 45"	1

== Individual 2008 UCI ProTour standings after race ==
As of April 20, 2008, after the 2008 Amstel Gold Race. After winning the Amstel Gold Race, Damiano Cunego became the new leader of the 2008 UCI ProTour.

Rank	Name	Team	Points
1	Damiano Cunego (ITA)	Lampre	73
2	André Greipel (GER)	High Road	62
3	Alberto Contador (ESP)	Astana	58
4	~~Thomas Dekker (NED)~~	~~Rabobank~~	52
5	Stijn Devolder (BEL)	Quick-Step	50
6	José Joaquín Rojas (ESP)	Caisse d'Epargne	45
7	Cadel Evans (AUS)	Silence–Lotto	42
8	Óscar Freire (ESP)	Rabobank	40
9	Nick Nuyens (BEL)	Cofidis, Le Crédit par Téléphone	40
10	Juan Antonio Flecha (ESP)	Rabobank	35

== See also ==
- 2008 in road cycling
