= 2005 Giro del Trentino =

Race details
- Dates: 19–22 April 2005
- Stages: 4
- Distance: 682.8 km (424.3 mi)
- Winning time: 17h 45' 29"

Results
| | Winner | Julio Alberto Pérez (MEX) |
| | Second | Evgeni Petrov (RUS) |
| | Third | Sergio Ghisalberti (ITA) |

The 2005 Giro del Trentino was the 29th edition of the Tour of the Alps cycle race and was held on 19 April to 22 April 2005. The race started in Mori and finished in Arco di Trento. The race was won by Julio Alberto Pérez.

== General classification ==
Final general classification

| Rank | Rider | Time |
|---|---|---|
| 1 | Julio Alberto Pérez (MEX) | 17h 45' 29" |
| 2 | Evgeni Petrov (RUS) | + 34" |
| 3 | Sergio Ghisalberti (ITA) | + 44" |
| 4 | David Bernabeu (ESP) | + 52" |
| 5 | David George (RSA) | + 1' 14" |
| 6 | Tiaan Kannemeyer (RSA) | + 1' 15" |
| 7 | Julián Sánchez (ESP) | + 1' 23" |
| 8 | José Rujano (VEN) | + 1' 23" |
| 9 | Janez Brajkovič (SLO) | + 1' 29" |
| 10 | David Latasa (ESP) | + 1' 39" |
