= 2002 Tour de Romandie =

Race details
- Dates: 30 April–5 May 2002
- Stages: 5 + Prologue
- Distance: 706 km (439 mi)
- Winning time: 15h 53' 44"

Results
	Winner	Dario Frigo (ITA)	(Tacconi Sport)
	Second	Alex Zülle (SUI)	(Team Coast)
	Third	Cadel Evans (AUS)	(Mapei–Quick-Step)

The 2002 Tour de Romandie was the 56th edition of the Tour de Romandie cycle race and was held from 30 April to 5 May 2002. The race started in Geneva and finished in Lausanne. The race was won by Dario Frigo of the Tacconi Sport team.

== General classification ==
Final general classification
Rank	Rider	Team	Time
1	Dario Frigo (ITA)	Tacconi Sport	15h 53' 44"
2	Alex Zülle (SUI)	Team Coast	+ 47"
3	Cadel Evans (AUS)	Mapei–Quick-Step	+ 51"
4	Santiago Pérez (ESP)	Kelme–Costa Blanca	+ 1' 04"
5	Carlos Sastre (ESP)	CSC–Tiscali	+ 1' 05"
6	Andrea Noè (ITA)	Mapei–Quick-Step	+ 1' 14"
7	Alexandre Moos (SUI)	Phonak	+ 1' 15"
8	Aitor González (ESP)	Kelme–Costa Blanca	+ 1' 17"
9	Eddy Mazzoleni (ITA)	Tacconi Sport	+ 1' 22"
10	Íñigo Cuesta (ESP)	Cofidis	+ 1' 37"
