= Luca Mazzanti =

Italian cyclist

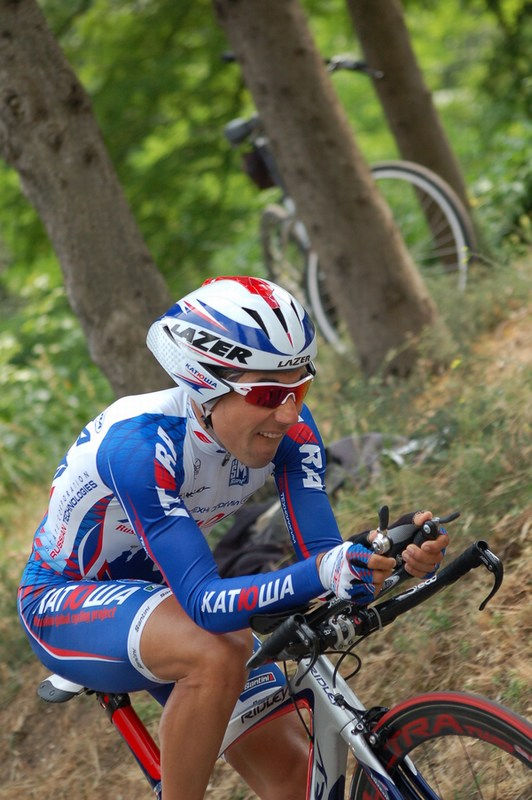

Personal information
- Full name: Luca Mazzanti
- Born: 4 February 1974 (age 52) Bologna, Italy
- Height: 1.70 m (5 ft 7 in)
- Weight: 64 kg (141 lb)

Cycling career
- Sport: Cycling
- Current team: Retired
- Discipline: Road
- Role: Rider

Professional teams
- 1997: Refin–Mobilvetta
- 1998–1999: Cantina Tollo–Alexia Alluminio
- 2000–2001: Fassa Bortolo
- 2002: Mercatone Uno
- 2003–2007: Ceramiche Panaria–Fiordo
- 2008: Tinkoff Credit Systems
- 2009–2010: Team Katusha
- 2011–2013: Farnese Vini–Neri Sottoli

Major wins
- Ster Elektrotoer (2001); Coppi e Bartali (2003); Giro d'Oro (2005); Gran Premio di Lugano (2007)

Luca Mazzanti (born 4 February 1974 in Bologna) is an Italian former professional road bicycle racer, who competed as a professional between 1997 and 2013. Mazzanti participated in thirteen Giro d'Italias between 1997 and 2012, while his highest place finish (20th) was achieved in 2006.

Mazzanti retired at the end of the 2013 season.

== Palmares ==
1997
4th, GP Industria & Artigianato di Larciano
9th, Giro di Toscana
1998
1st, Grand Prix de Fourmies
2nd, Gran Premio Bruno Beghelli
3rd, GP Industria & Artigianato di Larciano
7th, Gran Premio di Chiasso
8th, Coppa Placci
1999
4th, Trofeo Pantalica
9th, Giro del Friuli
9th, Giro del Lazio
9th, Trofeo Laigueglia
10th, Giro della Romagna
2000
3rd, Trofeo Matteotti
9th, Trofeo Laigueglia
2001
Ster Elektrotoer

1st, Stage 3
1st, Points Classification

2nd, Trofeo Matteotti
2002
6th, Trofeo Matteotti
6th, GP Industria & Artigianato di Larciano
8th, Giro del Friuli
9th, Giro del Lazio
9th, Trofeo Pantalica
9th, Giro dell'Appennino
10th, Trofeo Laigueglia
2003
1st, Stage 3, Settimana Internazionale di Coppi e Bartali
3rd, Gran Premio Città di Camaiore
3rd, Gran Premio Bruno Beghelli
4th, GP Industria & Artigianato di Larciano
4th, Giro del Friuli
5th, Giro dell'Appennino
5th, Tre Valli Varesine
7th, Overall, Brixia Tour
8th, Coppa Ugo Agostoni
8th, Trofeo Melinda
9th, Trofeo Laigueglia
2004
4th, Coppa Placci
5th, Trofeo Melinda
7th, Giro del Friuli
7th, Giro dell'Appennino
7th, Giro del Trentino
9th, Giro dell'Emilia
10th, Giro di Lombardia
10th, Giro del Lazio
2005
1st, Giro d'Oro
1st, GP Industria & Artigianato di Larciano
1st, Stage 4, Giro d'Italia
2nd, Giro dell'Appennino
3rd, Trofeo Melinda
8th, Tre Valli Varesine
9th, Milano–Torino
10th, Giro dell'Emilia
2006
2nd, Overall, Giro del Trentino

1st, Stage 1

2nd, Giro dell'Appennino
3rd, Overall, Vuelta a Asturias
3rd, Giro d'Oro
5th, Memorial Cimurri
5th, Trofeo Melinda
5th, Tre Valli Varesine
6th, Gran Premio Città di Misano – Adriatico
7th, Milano–Torino
8th, Gran Premio Città di Camaiore
8th, Gran Premio di Chiasso
9th, Gran Premio di Lugano
9th, Giro dell'Emilia
10th, Italian Road Race Championships
2007
1st, Gran Premio di Lugano
2nd, Memorial Cimurri
3rd, Coppa Ugo Agostoni
3rd, Gran Premio di Chiasso
3rd, Overall, Giro del Trentino
7th, Giro di Lombardia
7th, Gran Premio Bruno Beghelli
8th, Giro dell'Emilia
2008
4th, Gran Premio di Lugano
5th, Giro d'Oro
6th, Coppa Sabatini
7th, Memorial Cimurri
2009
2nd, Grand Prix d'Isbergues
6th, Gran Premio Bruno Beghelli
9th, Coppa Sabatini
2010
5th, Eschborn-Frankfurt City Loop
8th, Gran Premio Bruno Beghelli
9th, Trofeo Laigueglia
2011
2nd, Gran Premio Nobili Rubinetterie
8th, Overall, Settimana Ciclistica Lombarda
10th, Japan Cup
2013
2nd, Giro dell'Appennino
9th, Trofeo Matteotti
