= Gran Premio Città di Misano – Adriatico =

Italian bicycle race

Gran Premio Città di Misano - Adriatico
Race details
- Date: Mid September
- Region: Emilia-Romagna, Italy
- Local name: Gran Premio Città di Misano - Adriatico (in Italian)
- Discipline: Road
- Competition: UCI Europe Tour
- Type: Single-day
- Organiser: Gruppo Sportivo Emilia

History
- First edition: 2004
- Editions: 6
- Final edition: 2010
- First winner: Krzyszof Szczawinski (POL)
- Final winner: Danilo Napolitano (ITA)

The Gran Premio Città di Misano – Adriatico (also known as Memorial Viviana Manservisi) was a single-day road bicycle race held annually between Sant'Agostino and Comacchio, in the region of Emilia-Romagna, Italy from 2004 until 2010. The race was organised as a 1.1 event on the UCI Europe Tour.

== Winners ==
| Year | Country | Rider | Team |
|---|---|---|---|
| 2004 | Poland | Krzystof Szczawinski | Team Icet |
| 2005 | Argentina | Guillermo Bongiorno | Ceramica Panaria–Navigare |
| 2006 | Italy | Daniele Bennati | Lampre–Fondital |
| 2007 | Italy | Danilo Napolitano | Lampre–Fondital |
| 2008 | Italy | Alessandro Petacchi | LPR Brakes–Ballan |
| 2009 | No race | | |
| 2010 | Italy | Francesco Chicchi | Liquigas–Doimo |
