= Tour of the Alps =

Multi-day road cycling race

Giro del Trentino

Race details
- Date: Mid-to-Late April
- Region: Tyrol–South Tyrol–Trentino, Austria and Italy
- English name: Tour of Trentino
- Local name: Giro del Trentino (in Italian)
- Discipline: Road
- Competition: UCI ProSeries
- Type: Stage race
- Web site: tourofthealps.eu

History
- First edition: 1962
- Editions: 47 (as of 2024)
- First winner: Enzo Moser (ITA)
- Most wins: Damiano Cunego (ITA) (3 wins)
- Most recent: Juan Pedro López (ESP)

The Tour of the Alps is an annual professional cycling stage race in Italy and Austria. First held in 1962, it was named Giro del Trentino (English: Tour of Trentino) until 2016, and run over four stages in the Trentino-Alto Adige/Südtirol region of Italy. In 2015, the race merged with the nearby one-day race Trofeo Melinda, and the 2015 edition was called the Giro del Trentino Melinda.

In 2017, the event was renamed Tour of the Alps, as it addresses the entire Euroregion of Tyrol–South Tyrol–Trentino, formed by three different regional authorities in two countries: the Austrian state of Tyrol and the Italian autonomous provinces of South Tyrol and Trentino. It should not be confused with the similarly named Giro al Sas di Trento, an annual road running competition in the city of Trento.

Since its rebranding, the race is run mid-to-late April over five stages, as a 2.HC event of the UCI Europe Tour, the level beneath the UCI World Tour. The race became part of the new UCI ProSeries in 2020.

The Tour of the Alps, typically featuring short and mountainous stages, is considered a last preparation race for the key contenders of the Giro d'Italia, which starts two weeks after the Tour of the Alps finishes. Eleven winners of the Giro del Trentino have also won the Giro d'Italia, ten of them Italians: Francesco Moser, Giuseppe Saronni, Franco Chioccioli, Gianni Bugno, Gilberto Simoni, Paolo Savoldelli, Damiano Cunego, Vincenzo Nibali, Ivan Basso and Michele Scarponi. The remaining winner of both the Tour of the Alps and the Giro d'Italia is Briton Tao Geoghegan Hart who uniquely won the Giro (2020) before winning the Tour of the Alps (2023).

Damiano Cunego holds the race record with three overall wins.

== History ==
The first edition of the race was held in 1962. It consisted of a single stage that started and finished in Trento. It was won by Enzo Moser. After a second edition in 1963, the third edition was not held until 1979. There were two unofficial races, in 1977 and 1978 but they remain disputed and usually not treated as official Giro del Trentino races. The 1986 edition of the race was unusual in that there was no individual prize awarded. It was instead a team competition called the Coppa Italia and the first place went to Carrera–Inoxpran. One of the stages of the 1995 Giro del Trentino went to Innsbruck in neighbouring Austria, and stages to and from Lienz in Austria have remained a regular feature of the race since that time. In 2012, the race included a team time trial for the first time, which constituted the first stage of the race. The team time-trial was retained for the 2013 edition.

== List of winners ==
Year	Country	Rider	Team
1962	Italy	Enzo Moser	San Pellegrino
1963	Italy	Guido De Rosso	Molteni
1964– 1978	No race		
1979	Norway	Knut Knudsen	Bianchi–Faema
1980	Italy	Francesco Moser	Sanson
1981	Italy	Roberto Visentini	Sammontana
1982	Italy	Giuseppe Saronni	Del Tongo
1983	Italy	Francesco Moser	Gis Gelati
1984	Italy	Franco Chioccioli	Murella–Rossin
1985	Austria	Harald Maier	Gis Gelati
1986	Italy	Team edition	Carrera–Inoxpran
1987	Italy	Claudio Corti	Supermercati Brianzoli
1988	Switzerland	Urs Zimmermann	Carrera Jeans–Vagabond
1989	Italy	Mauro Santaromita	Pepsi Cola–Alba Cucine
1990	Italy	Gianni Bugno	Chateau d'Ax–Salotti
1991	Venezuela	Leonardo Sierra	Selle Italia–Magniarredo
1992	Italy	Claudio Chiappucci	Carrera Jeans–Vagabond
1993	Italy	Maurizio Fondriest	Lampre–Polti
1994	Italy	Moreno Argentin	Gewiss–Ballan
1995	Switzerland	Heinz Imboden	Refin
1996	Italy	Wladimir Belli	Panaria–Vinavil
1997	France	Luc Leblanc	Polti
1998	Italy	Paolo Savoldelli	Saeco–Cannondale
1999	Italy	Paolo Savoldelli	Saeco–Cannondale
2000	Italy	Simone Borgheresi	Mercatone Uno–Albacom
2001	Italy	Francesco Casagrande	Fassa Bortolo
2002	Italy	Francesco Casagrande	Fassa Bortolo
2003	Italy	Gilberto Simoni	Saeco
2004	Italy	Damiano Cunego	Saeco
2005	Mexico	Julio Alberto Pérez	Ceramica Panaria–Navigare
2006	Italy	Damiano Cunego	Lampre–Fondital
2007	Italy	Damiano Cunego	Lampre–Fondital
2008	Italy	Vincenzo Nibali	Liquigas
2009	Italy	Ivan Basso	Liquigas
2010	Kazakhstan	Alexander Vinokourov	Astana
2011	Italy	Michele Scarponi	Lampre–ISD
2012	Italy	Domenico Pozzovivo	Colnago–CSF Bardiani
2013	Italy	Vincenzo Nibali	Astana
2014	Australia	Cadel Evans	BMC Racing Team
2015	Australia	Richie Porte	Team Sky
2016	Spain	Mikel Landa	Team Sky
2017	Great Britain	Geraint Thomas	Team Sky
2018	France	Thibaut Pinot	Groupama–FDJ
2019	Russia	Pavel Sivakov	Team Sky
2020	No race		
2021	Great Britain	Simon Yates	Team BikeExchange
2022	France	Romain Bardet	Team DSM
2023	Great Britain	Tao Geoghegan Hart	Ineos Grenadiers
2024	Spain	Juan Pedro López	Lidl–Trek
2025	Australia	Michael Storer	Tudor Pro Cycling Team
2026	Italy	Giulio Pellizzari	Red Bull–Bora–Hansgrohe

=== Repeat winners ===
Wins	Rider	Editions
3	Damiano Cunego (ITA)	2004, 2006, 2007
2	Francesco Moser (ITA)	1980, 1983
2	Paolo Savoldelli (ITA)	1998, 1999
2	Francesco Casagrande (ITA)	2001, 2002
2	Vincenzo Nibali (ITA)	2008, 2013

=== Wins per nation ===
Wins	Country
30	Italy
3	France; United Kingdom; Australia
2	Spain; Switzerland
1	Austria; Kazakhstan; Mexico; Norway; Russia; Venezuela
