= Sylwester Szmyd =

Polish cyclist

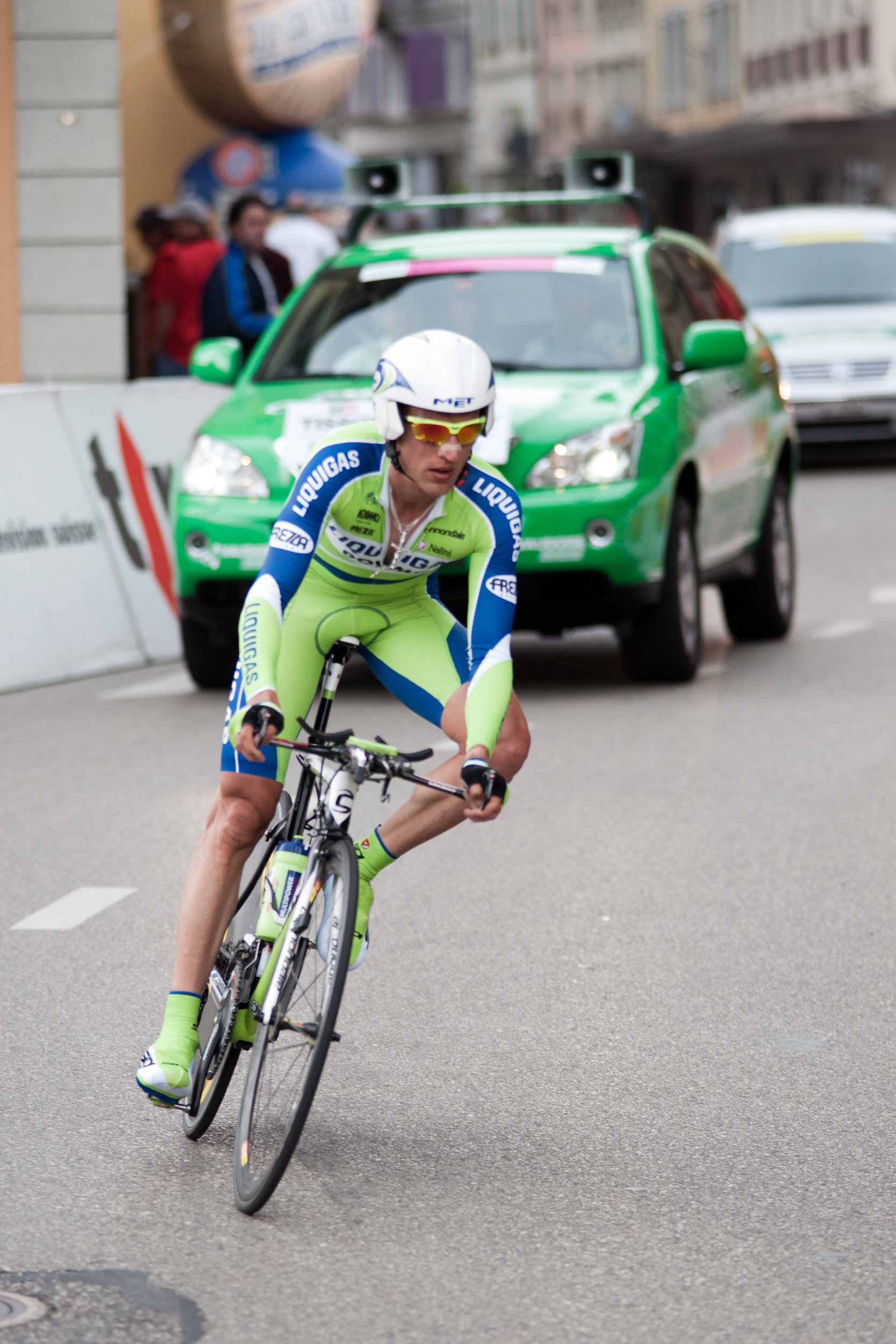
- Szmyd at the 2010 Tour de Romandie

Personal information
- Full name: Sylwester Szmyd
- Born: 2 March 1978 (age 48) Bydgoszcz, Poland
- Height: 1.78 m (5 ft 10 in)
- Weight: 63 kg (139 lb)

Cycling career
- Sport: Cycling
- Current team: Retired
- Discipline: Road
- Role: Rider
- Rider type: Climber; Domestique

Professional teams
- 2002–2003: Mercatone Uno
- 2004: Saeco
- 2005–2008: Lampre–Caffita
- 2009–2012: Liquigas
- 2013–2014: Movistar Team
- 2015–2016: CCC–Sprandi–Polkowice

Major wins
- 1 stage Criterium du Dauphiné Libéré (2009)

Sylwester Szmyd (born 2 March 1978) is a Polish former professional road bicycle racer, who rode professionally between 2002 and 2016.

Born in Bydgoszcz, Szmyd competed as a climber who served as a leader in smaller stage races, and as a strong mountain domestique for his team leaders in the Grand Tours. He completed all of the 23 Grand Tours that he started during his career.

== Professional career ==
In 2009, Szmyd scored the first victory of his career when he crossed the finish line atop the Mont Ventoux during the Critérium du Dauphiné Libéré. He had broken away with Alejandro Valverde (Caisse d'Epargne) and the pair finished together. Szmyd said afterward that he was so used to sacrifice himself as a domestique for his captains that his legs almost buckled in the last corner when he realized he would win.

In the 2012 Giro del Trentino, Szmyd was allowed to race for himself and placed well on the final two stages of the race, which were mountainous. In stage 3, he came in second place after tackling a very steep climb, the Punta Veleno (8.5 kilometres (5.3 miles) at an average 15% gradient). The finish line was situated 1.5 km (0.93 mi) after the summit. On the last stage to the Pordoi Pass, Szmyd finished in fourth position at the altitude finish, securing his third place in the overall classification. Snow was falling as he, race winner Domenico Pozzovivo (Colnago–CSF Bardiani) and Damiano Cunego (Lampre–ISD) were accepting their awards on the podium.

He participated in the Giro d'Italia a couple of weeks later, riding in support of his leader Ivan Basso. He set the pace for the lead group numerous times in the hilly stages and managed a 28th general classification spot.

Szmyd left his team of four years Liquigas–Cannondale at the end of the 2012 season, and joined the Movistar Team on a two-year contract, from the 2013 season onwards. In December 2014 Szmyd announced he was joining the Polish CCC–Sprandi–Polkowice team on a one-year deal for 2015, after expressing dissatisfaction about his time at Movistar, where he was only selected for a Grand Tour once during his two years with the team.

== Major results ==
1999
4th Overall Ronde de l'Isard
2000
2nd GP Capodarco
2001
6th Overall Tour de Pologne
9th Gran Premio de Llodio
2002
3rd Gran Premio Fred Mengoni
6th Schynberg-Rundfahrt
2003
8th Overall Giro del Trentino
2004
2nd GP Triberg-Schwarzwald
4th Japan Cup
2005
7th GP Industria & Artigianato di Larciano
2006
5th Japan Cup
6th Overall Giro del Trentino
9th Overall Settimana Internazionale di Coppi e Bartali
10th Overall Tour de Romandie
2007
2nd Overall Settimana Ciclistica Lombarda
7th Giro dell'Emilia
9th Overall Tour de Romandie
2008
5th Giro dell'Appennino
8th Overall Giro del Trentino
8th Overall Critérium du Dauphiné Libéré
9th Overall Settimana Internazionale di Coppi e Bartali
2009
1st Stage 5 Critérium du Dauphiné Libéré
7th Overall Tour de Pologne
2010
1st Stage 4 (TTT) Giro d'Italia
6th Overall Tour de Pologne
10th Overall Critérium du Dauphiné
2012
3rd Overall Giro del Trentino
7th Overall Tour de Romandie
2013
9th Vuelta a la Comunidad de Madrid
2014
3rd Overall Vuelta a Castilla y León
2015
3rd Overall Tour of Croatia

=== Grand Tour general classification results timeline ===
Grand Tour	2002	2003	2004	2005	2006	2007	2008	2009	2010	2011	2012	2013	2014	2015
Giro d'Italia	44	24	43	64	19	28	23	43	60	82	28	—	—	45
Tour de France	—	—	—	—	—	—	27	—	61	42	71	—	—	—
Vuelta a España	29	—	74	24	14	25	—	17	—	—	—	45	—	—

Legend
—	Did not compete
DNF	Did not finish
