= Domenico Pozzovivo =

Italian racing cyclist

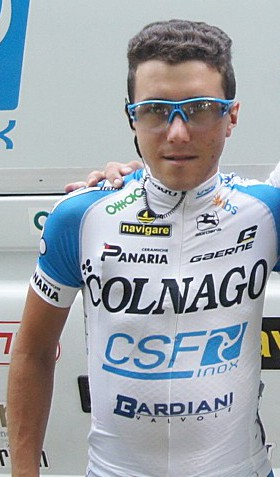
- Pozzovivo at the 2012 Tour de Pologne

Personal information
- Full name: Domenico Pozzovivo
- Nicknames: La pulce di Policoro (The flea from Policoro); Il lupo dello Jonio (The wolf of the Ionian); Dom-Dom
- Born: 30 November 1982 (age 43) Policoro, Italy
- Height: 1.65 m (5 ft 5 in)
- Weight: 53 kg (117 lb; 8 st 5 lb)

Cycling career
- Sport: Cycling
- Discipline: Road
- Role: Rider
- Rider type: Climber

Professional teams
- 2005–2012: Ceramica Panaria–Navigare
- 2013–2017: Ag2r–La Mondiale
- 2018–2019: Bahrain–Merida
- 2020–2021: NTT Pro Cycling
- 2022: Intermarché–Wanty–Gobert Matériaux
- 2023: Israel–Premier Tech
- 2024: VF Group–Bardiani–CSF–Faizanè

Major wins
- Grand Tours Giro d'Italia 1 individual stage (2012) Stage races Giro del Trentino (2012)

Domenico Pozzovivo (born 30 November 1982) is an Italian road racing cyclist, who competes for the UCI pro team Solution Tech NIPPO Rali. His very small stature confers him with the qualities of a pure climbing specialist. He is most known for a victory in stage 8 of the 2012 Giro d'Italia, an overall victory in the 2012 Giro del Trentino, and is notable for his educational attainments.

== Personal life ==
Pozzovivo has a degree in economics and wrote a thesis entitled "Southern politics from the unity of Italy up to the present day". His educational attainments have earned him the nickname "Dr. Pozzovivo" in the peloton. He stated that his fields of interest outside cycling are history, technology, economics, politics and weather forecasts. He plays piano and speaks French fluently and stated that a jump into politics would interest him after his cycling career.

== Career ==
In 2008, Pozzovivo finished on the third step of the podium of the Giro del Trentino, which had a race categorization of 2.1. The first place went to Vincenzo Nibali of Liquigas while Stefano Garzelli from the Acqua & Sapone–Caffè Mokambo took the second place. He then participated in his third Giro d'Italia. While he was not considered a favorite for the overall rankings prior to the race, he managed to finish in ninth position of the general classification. He notably took the second position on the fifteenth stage, a mountain affair finishing atop the Category 1 Passo Fedaia, which was featured for the first time in Giro history. He was bested only by his team-mate Emanuele Sella, who eventually tested positive for the blood booster MIRCERA and was later disqualified.

=== 2009 ===
In 2009, Pozzovivo took the fifth stage of the Settimana Ciclistica Lombarda, his first major victory since 2004. He also finished second in the general classification of the mountainous Brixia Tour, more than a minute behind the winner Giampaolo Caruso. He placed in the top ten of three stages in that race, including third on the second stage, three second in arrears of Leonardo Bertagnolli.

=== 2010 ===
The 2010 season saw Pozzovivo take a great stage victory in the Giro del Trentino, where he edged a surging from behind Riccardo Riccò of Ceramica Flaminia by 3 seconds. Pozzovivo finally took the third place overall, with the Kazakh Alexander Vinokourov of Astana taking the top honors. Pozzovivo came in second place of the 2.1 categorized Giro dell'Appennino, where he attacked on the daunting Passo della Bocchetta, with only Robert Kišerlovski being able to follow him and crest the climb with him. The pair collaborated well to the finish, where Pozzovivo was bested by the Liquigas–Doimo man in the sprint, therefore taking second place. In July, the diminutive Pozzovivo won the Brixia Tour, winning two mountain stages in the process. He prevailed in the overall classification of the five stage race by a margin of one minute and fifty seconds over Team Sky's Morris Possoni.

=== 2012 ===
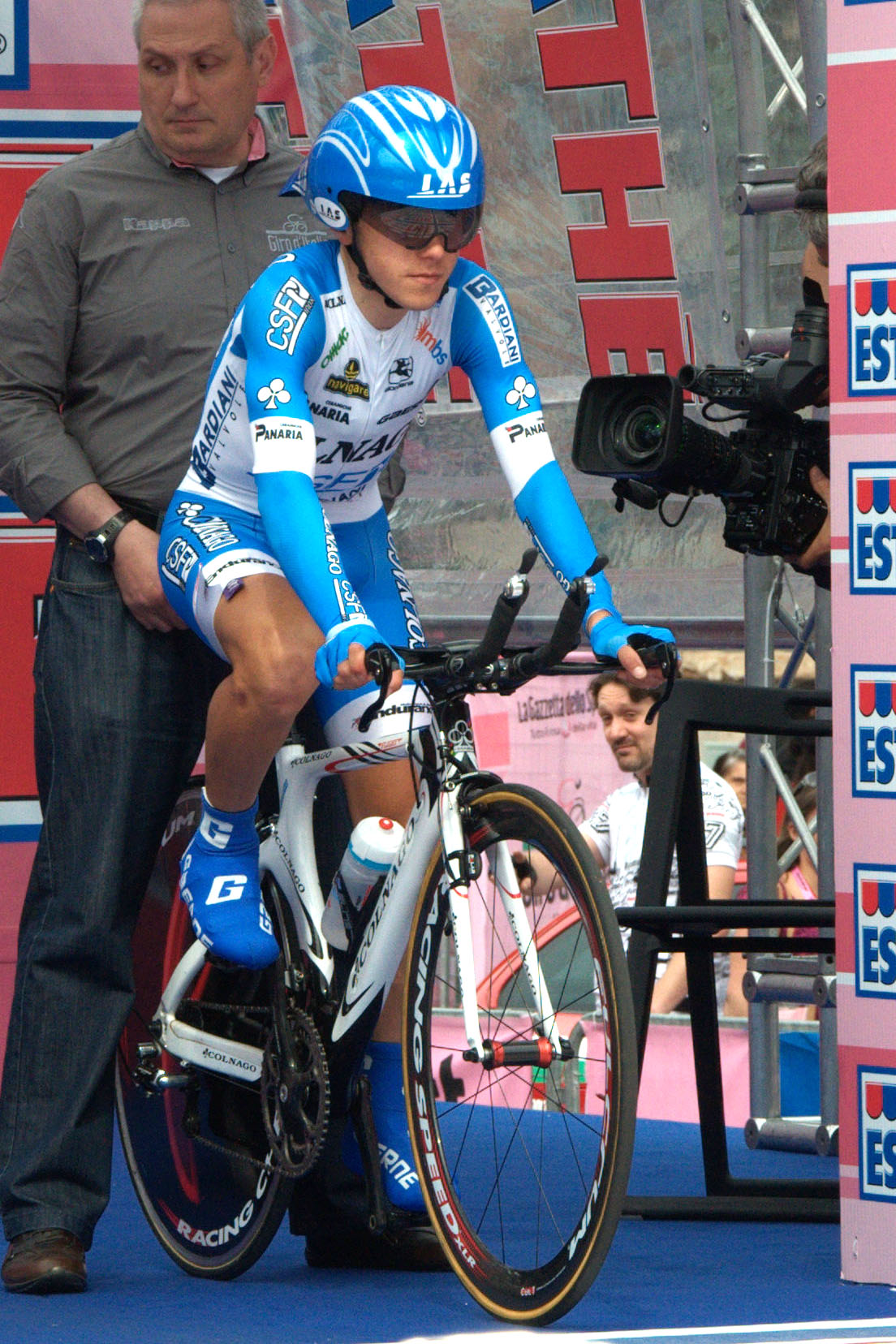
Domenico Pozzovivo before the start of an individual time trial in the Giro d'Italia 2012 in Milan

In 2012, Pozzovivo won the prestigious Giro del Trentino. He was victorious in stage 3 of that race, which led the riders from Pergine to Brenzone sul Garda, finishing after a steep climb, the Punta Veleno. Team cars were not allowed on that climb since it was very steep and the tarmac was inappropriate. Motorbikes were the only resource available for riders suffering a mechanical problem. The victory on that hard stage granted him the leader's jersey, which he managed to hold on to the following day on the fourth and final stage, which was disputed in snowy weather conditions. He finished that stage in third position. He also won the mountains classification jersey.

Later that year, he sailed to victory in stage 8 of the Giro d'Italia, attacking on the slopes of the Colle Molella, 7 kilometres (4.3 mi) away from the finish. His nearest pursuant, Spaniard Beñat Intxausti of Movistar Team, completed the stage with a 23 seconds deficit on Pozzovivo. He finished the Giro eighth overall, being always very competitive in the mountain stages. In June, Pozzovivo prevailed in the queen stage of the 2.1 rated Tour of Slovenia, a 219 kilometres (136 mi) course peppered with climbs. Pozzovivo broke away with Janez Brajkovič of Astana and somewhat surprisingly, beat Brajkovič in the sprint. With that operation, he took the overall classification leader's jersey thanks to a six-second lead over Brajkovič, but lost it the next day in the individual time trial, where Brajkovič bested him by ten seconds. Pozzovivo had to settle for the second place of the Tour.

In the fall, Pozzovivo took part in the Italian Classic Giro dell'Emilia and launched an attack in the steepest part of the final climb, while he was part of a small leading group of three riders. Nairo Quintana (Movistar Team) resisted in his wheel to place an attack of his own, which would prove to be the decisive move as the Colombian sailed to victory. Pozzovivo was passed by two competitors in the final meters and took the fourth place. Days later, Pozzovivo abandoned during the Giro di Lombardia, a race which suited him well in the past. The cold and heavy rain played a part in this outcome, as none of his Colnago team-mates reached the finish line either.

=== 2013 ===
For the 2013 season, Pozzovivo left Colnago–CSF Bardiani, where he started his professional career back in 2005, and moved to World Tour outfit Ag2r–La Mondiale. He was looking to repeat his 2012 win in the Giro del Trentino, but he had to withdraw after a crash in stage 3 of the race where he injured his elbow and broke two ribs. Due to this injury, and some unfortunate crashes, he was unable to perform to his best ability in the Giro d'Italia, although he still managed to finish 10th overall, his third top ten in the Giro.

In the Vuelta, Pozzovivo was able to return to his best. He was consistently in the top 10 during the mountain stages, and ended up finishing 6th overall, his highest finish thus far in a Grand Tour. He particularly surprised in the Stage 11 Time Trial, a discipline which generally does not suit him, where he finished third behind winner Fabian Cancellara and World Champion time trial champion at the time Tony Martin.

=== 2014 ===
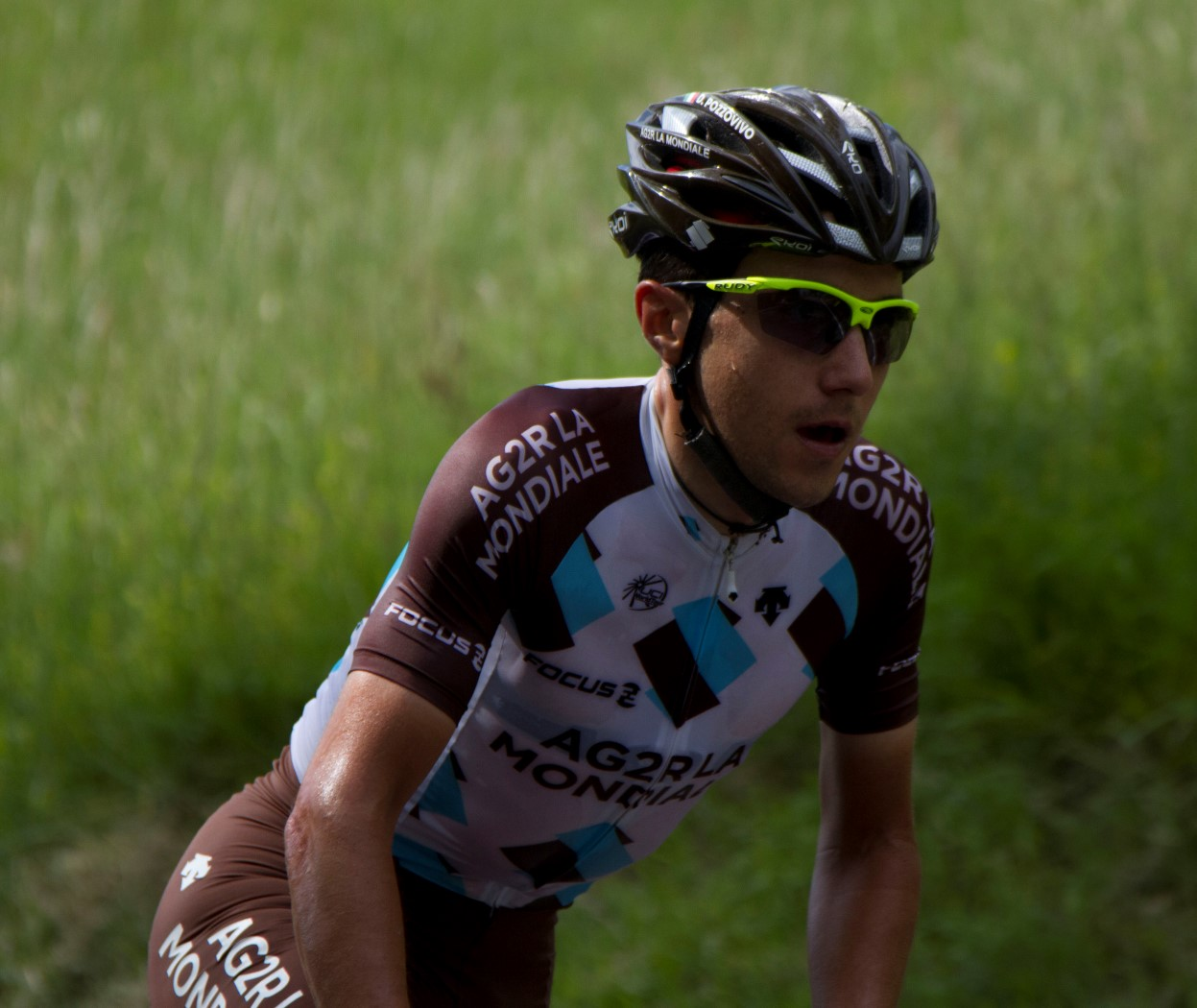
Pozzovivo at the 2014 Giro d'Italia

Pozzovivo took part in the Roma Maxima, where he escaped with Alejandro Valverde. The pair maintained their lead until the bunch caught Pozzovivo metres before the line. Valverde won, while Pozzovivo took fifth place. He finished sixth in the Tirreno–Adriatico stage race a week later.

Pozzovivo continued his preparation for his main goal in 2014, the Giro d'Italia, by racing the Giro del Trentino, where he finished second to Cadel Evans. Two days later, he was one of the main protagonists in Liege-Bastogne-Liege, a race he was participating in for the first time. He attacked with Julián Arredondo on the Cote de Roche aux Faucons, and although he was caught, he attacked again with Giampaolo Caruso on the Cote de Saint-Nicolas, and was caught with 200 metres (660 feet) to go, eventually finishing 5th.

Pozzovivo started the Giro well, avoiding any crashes during the wet opening week and attacking on Stage 9 to Sestola, where he finished third on the day behind the breakaway, taking 30 seconds from his rivals and moving into 4th in the General Classification. He also attacked successfully on Stage 14 to Oropa, but fell ill with Bronchitis on the next day, a mountain top finish at Montecampione, losing time to nearly all his rivals. He managed to recover sufficiently during the rest day to win back time on the remaining peloton on the Queen Stage up to Val Martello on Stage 16, after Nairo Quintana, Pierre Rolland and Ryder Hesjedal had gone away earlier in the stage. He also managed to move up in the overall standings on both Stages 18 and 19, a mountain-top finish and an uphill time trial. He eventually finished in 5th place, his highest ever finish in the Giro up to that point and his first ever top-5 finish in a Grand Tour.

Pozzovivo did not participate in the Tour de France to focus his efforts on the Vuelta a España. However, he had to forget the Spain Grand Tour when he crashed in training, breaking his tibia. Pozzovivo said in an interview that he was able to bicycle before he was able to walk on his way to recovery and that he sent his team an e-mail to the effect that he was ready to come back sooner than expected, at the Il Lombardia race. "It's a crazy idea and so it might not be taken into consideration [by the team]. I have suffered and I still suffer physically but I believe that that the head makes the difference." Ultimately, Pozzovivo's return race was Milano–Torino at the end of 2014 and he did race the Il Lombardia race afterward.

=== 2015 ===
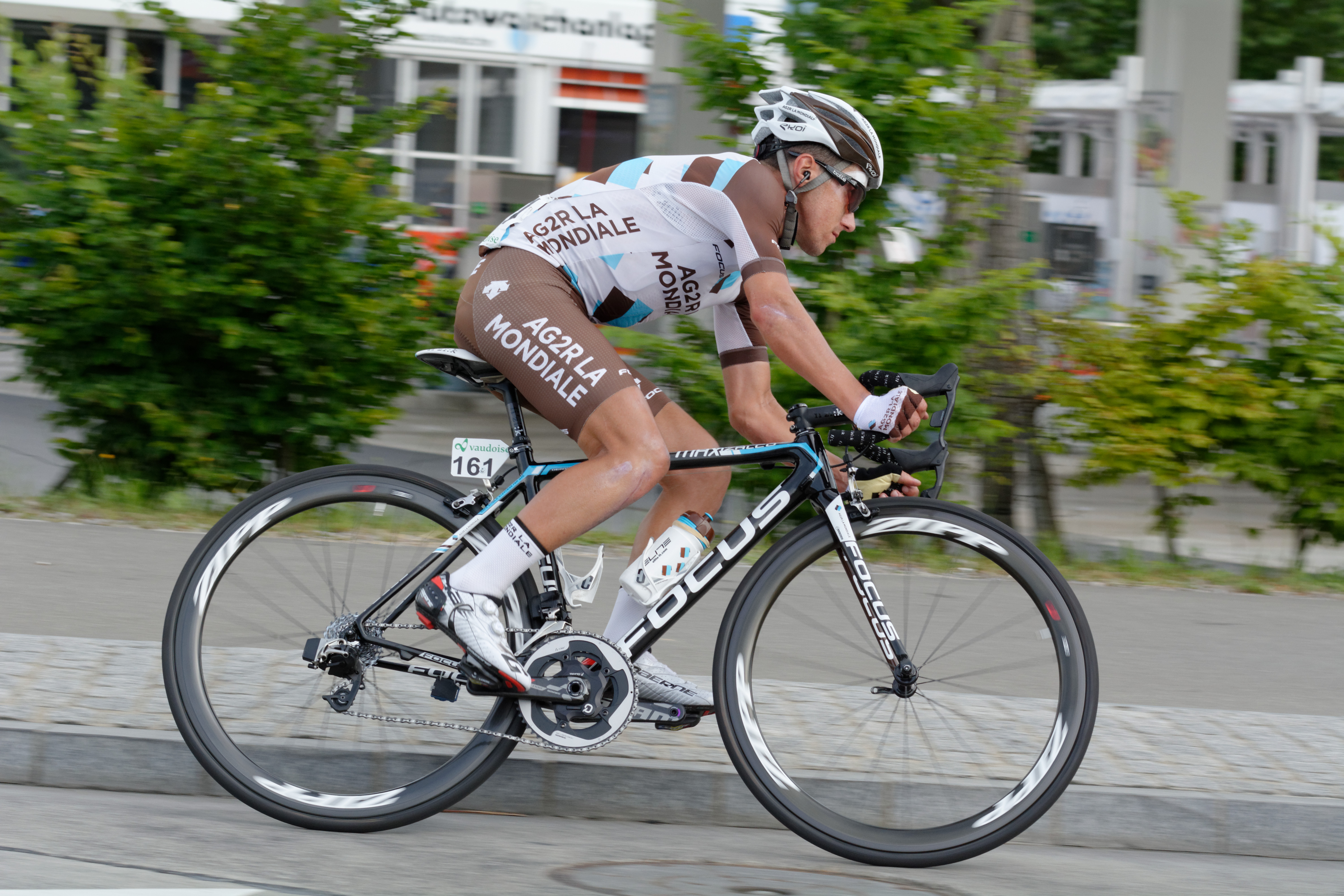
Domenico Pozzovivo at the 2015 Tour de Suisse

Pozzovivo started his season in January at Australia's Tour Down Under, despite suffering from a minor wrist fracture. He stated he was aiming for a top 5 Overall. He finally finished sixth in the general classification. In March, he went on to finish eighth overall in Tirreno–Adriatico. He grabbed his first victory since 2012 on a stage of the Volta a Catalunya. He was part of a group of seven favorites and he attacked two kilometers from the finish line to win solo on the flat finale, after the race went over several climbs. He finally finished the stage race on the third step of the podium. At the end of April, Pozzovivo participated in the mountainous Giro del Trentino. He lost time on Stage 2, but made up for it by taking the stage victory on Stage 3, distancing Richie Porte and Mikel Landa by five seconds after attacking with two kilometers remaining. He finally finished seventh in the general classification of the race. Two days after the Giro del Trentino concluded, Pozzovivo finished eighth of Liège–Bastogne–Liège as part of the leading group.

Pozzovivo's next objective was the Giro d'Italia, but things got off to a bad start: after losing time on the opening team time trial, he lost more than a minute on the second stage because of a crash. On stage 3, the following day, things took a turn for the worse as he crashed head first on a descent with 35 km (21.7 mi) to go. Shortly afterwards, AG2R reported that he was in a stable state, even though he appeared to be bleeding heavily from his head region on television pictures. On the same night, he passed a CT scan which revealed no brain injury and talked to La Gazzetta dello Sport: "It was a long night and I even made some plans for the future," said Pozzovivo. "I was in the best condition of my life and I'm thinking about returning at the Tour de Suisse and being competitive."

Pozzovivo did return at the Tour de Suisse and registered second place on the queen stage of the race, a 237.3 km (147.5 mi) affair which finished at the foot of the Rettenbach glacier. He finished the event in fifth position in the general classification. He then participated in the National Road Race Championships where he came in sixth.

=== 2018 ===
For 2018, Pozzovivo signed for Bahrain–Merida, beginning his season with the Tour Down Under. AT the mountainous Tour of the Alps, Pozzovivo took his first podium of the year, finishing in second place overall thanks to continuous top-10 placings during the stages, and second place in best climber jersey as well. The next Sunday, he got fifth at Liège–Bastogne–Liège. He was the team's leader at the Giro d'Italia, finishing fifth in the general classification, came third in the Italian National Road Race Championships, and also raced at the Tour de France.

=== 2019 ===
Pozzovivo came second in the Tour of Oman, and rode in the Giro d'Italia. On 11 August 2019, Pozzovivo was severely injured after colliding with a car during a training ride. He was "hit head on" by the car and suffered fractures to his right leg, left arm, collarbone, and ribs. According to Cycling Weekly, it was doubtful if Pozzovivo would return to racing, considering the severity of his injuries.

=== 2020 ===
For 2020, Pozzovivo signed for NTT Pro Cycling, and began his season in February with the Tour de la Provence. He was forced to abandon the Tour de France after stage 9 due to another injury to his elbow caused by a crash on the opening stage. He then rode the Giro d'Italia to an eventual 11th place overall. Following the Giro d'Italia, he underwent more surgery on his elbow.

=== 2021 ===
Pozzovivo remained with the now-renamed Team Qhubeka Assos, beginning his season at the UAE Tour. In the Giro d'Italia, he sustained another injury to his left elbow which forced him to abandon the race after stage 6. He recovered to ride to sixth place in the Tour de Suisse, and was as high as third at the Vuelta a Burgos but was forced to withdraw with a fractured knee. Due to financial troubles, the team disbanded at the end of 2021, having failed to secure sufficient sponsorship for a UCI WorldTeam licence, and Pozzovivo was left without a team and contemplating retirement.

=== 2022 ===
Pozzovivo joined the Intermarché–Wanty–Gobert Matériaux team midway through February, making his first start at the Vuelta a Andalucía. He finished in the top-ten overall at the Giro d'Italia and the Tour de Suisse.

== Major results ==
2002
6th Overall GP Kranj
2003
4th GP Kranj
5th GP Città di Felino
6th Liège–Bastogne–Liège Espoirs
7th Gran Premio Palio del Recioto
2004
2nd Overall Giro della Valle d'Aosta
2nd GP Città di Felino
3rd Overall Girobio
3rd Gran Premio Palio del Recioto
4th Road race, UCI Road World Under-23 Championships
5th Trofeo Alcide Degasperi
6th Trofeo Banca Popolare di Vicenza
6th Giro del Belvedere
7th GP Capodarco
9th Overall Giro della Regione Friuli Venezia Giulia

1st Stage 4

10th Gran Premio San Giuseppe
10th Trofeo Gianfranco Bianchin
2005
5th Giro dell'Appennino
2007
3rd Overall Settimana Ciclistica Lombarda
8th Gran Premio Nobili Rubinetterie
2008
3rd Overall Giro del Trentino
5th Overall Brixia Tour
9th Overall Giro d'Italia
2009 (1 pro win)
1st Stage 5 Settimana Ciclistica Lombarda
2nd Overall Brixia Tour
3rd Overall Tour of Slovenia
5th Overall Giro del Trentino
6th Overall Settimana Internazionale di Coppi e Bartali
6th Coppa Sabatini
7th Trofeo Melinda
9th Overall Tour de Luxembourg
9th Giro dell'Appennino
2010 (4)
1st Overall Brixia Tour

1st Stages 2 & 4

2nd Giro dell'Appennino
2nd Tre Valli Varesine
3rd Overall Giro del Trentino

1st Stage 4

3rd Trofeo Matteotti
3rd Giro della Romagna
5th Trofeo Melinda
6th Coppa Sabatini
6th Giro dell'Emilia
7th Overall Tirreno–Adriatico
7th Giro del Piemonte
8th Overall Giro di Sardegna
2011 (1)
2nd Overall Brixia Tour

1st Stage 4

2nd Tre Valli Varesine
3rd Trofeo Melinda
4th Overall Vuelta a Castilla y León
4th Overall Giro del Trentino
5th Overall Settimana Ciclistica Lombarda
6th Giro di Lombardia
6th Giro di Toscana
6th Gran Premio Nobili Rubinetterie
7th Overall Tour de Langkawi
8th Overall Giro di Padania
8th Giro dell'Emilia
10th Overall Settimana Internazionale di Coppi e Bartali
10th Coppa Sabatini
2012 (4)
1st Overall Giro del Trentino

1st Mountains classification
1st Stage 3

2nd Overall Tour of Slovenia

1st Stage 3

4th Overall Giro di Padania

1st Stage 1b (TTT)

4th Giro dell'Emilia
4th Gran Premio Città di Camaiore
5th Gran Premio Bruno Beghelli
7th Trofeo Melinda
7th Milano–Torino
8th Overall Giro d'Italia

1st Stage 8

8th GP Industria & Artigianato di Larciano
10th Tre Valli Varesine
2013
4th Milano–Torino
6th Overall Vuelta a España
7th Overall Tour de Pologne
7th Eschborn–Frankfurt City Loop
9th Overall Tour of Oman
9th Giro dell'Emilia
10th Overall Giro d'Italia
2014
2nd Overall Giro del Trentino
5th Overall Giro d'Italia
5th Roma Maxima
5th Liège–Bastogne–Liège
6th Overall Tour of Oman
6th Overall Tirreno–Adriatico
8th Overall Volta a Catalunya
10th Overall Tour de San Luis
2015 (2)
3rd Overall Volta a Catalunya

1st Stage 3

5th Overall Tour de Suisse
6th Overall Tour Down Under
7th Overall Giro del Trentino

1st Stage 3

7th Milano–Torino
8th Overall Tirreno–Adriatico
8th Liège–Bastogne–Liège
10th Overall Tour de l'Ain
2016
7th Overall Tour Down Under
7th Overall Giro del Trentino
7th Tour du Doubs
8th Overall Tour of Oman
10th Overall Vuelta a Burgos
2017 (1)
3rd Overall Tour of the Alps
4th Overall Tour de Suisse

1st Stage 6

6th Overall Giro d'Italia
6th Overall Tour de Pologne
6th Giro di Lombardia
9th Overall Abu Dhabi Tour
10th Overall Tirreno–Adriatico
2018
2nd Overall Tour of the Alps

1st Mountains classification

3rd Road race, National Road Championships
3rd Giro della Toscana
5th Overall Giro d'Italia
5th Liège–Bastogne–Liège
6th Gran Premio di Lugano
7th Milano–Torino
8th Giro di Lombardia
9th Giro dell'Emilia
2019
2nd Overall Tour of Oman
7th Overall Tour de Suisse
2021
6th Overall Tour de Suisse
2022
3rd Giro dell'Emilia
5th Coppa Ugo Agostoni
8th Overall Giro d'Italia
8th Tre Valli Varesine
9th Overall Tour de Suisse
2023
5th Overall Route d'Occitanie
6th Overall Settimana Internazionale di Coppi e Bartali
7th Mont Ventoux Dénivelé Challenge
2024
4th Overall Tour of Slovenia
6th Giro della Toscana
8th Overall Settimana Internazionale di Coppi e Bartali
10th Overall Giro d'Abruzzo
2026
2nd Overall Tour of Greece
3rd Overall Czech Tour
3rd Overall GP Beiras e Serra da Estrela
3rd Giro dell'Appennino
4th Mercan'Tour Classic
10th Overall Giro d'Abruzzo

=== General classification results timeline ===
Grand Tour general classification results
Grand Tour	2005	2006	2007	2008	2009	2010	2011	2012	2013	2014	2015	2016	2017	2018	2019	2020	2021	2022	2023	2024
Giro d'Italia	DNF	—	17	9	—	DNF	DNF	8	10	5	DNF	20	6	5	19	11	DNF	8	DNF	20
Tour de France	—	—	—	—	—	—	—	—	—	—	—	33	—	18	—	DNF	—	—	—	—
/ Vuelta a España	—	—	—	—	—	—	—	—	6	—	11	—	DNF	—	—	—	—	DNF	—	—
Major stage race general classification results
Race	2005	2006	2007	2008	2009	2010	2011	2012	2013	2014	2015	2016	2017	2018	2019	2020	2021	2022	2023	2024
Paris–Nice	—	—	—	—	—	—	—	—	—	—	—	—	—	—	26	—	—	—	—	—
/ Tirreno–Adriatico	—	—	—	—	—	7	—	11	11	6	8	32	10	14	—	—	28	13	—	31
Volta a Catalunya	—	—	—	—	—	—	—	—	25	8	3	17	—	—	—	NH	—	—	—	—
Tour of the Basque Country	Did not contest during his career																			
Tour de Romandie	Did not contest during his career																			
Critérium du Dauphiné	—	—	—	—	—	—	—	—	—	—	—	—	—	—	—	40	—	—	—	—
Tour de Suisse	—	—	—	—	—	—	—	—	DNF	DNF	5	—	4	—	7	NH	6	9	—	—

=== Monuments results timeline ===
Monument	2005	2006	2007	2008	2009	2010	2011	2012	2013	2014	2015	2016	2017	2018	2019	2020	2021	2022	2023	2024
Milan–San Remo	163	—	—	—	—	73	101	—	—	—	—	—	—	—	—	—	—	—	—	—
Tour of Flanders	Did not contest during his career																			
Paris–Roubaix	Did not contest during his career																			
Liège–Bastogne–Liège	—	—	—	—	—	—	—	—	—	5	8	63	12	5	—	—	60	26	—	—
Giro di Lombardia	49	54	30	22	—	DNF	6	DNF	15	85	19	37	6	8	—	—	30	DNF	—	38

Legend
—	Did not compete
DNF	Did not finish
NH	Not held
