= 2017 Il Lombardia =

2017 UCI World Tour, race 36 of 37
- Event logo

Race details
- Dates: 7 October 2017
- Stages: 1
- Distance: 247 km (153 mi)
- Winning time: 6h 15' 29"

Results
	Winner	Vincenzo Nibali (ITA)	(Bahrain–Merida)
	Second	Julian Alaphilippe (FRA)	(Quick-Step Floors)
	Third	Gianni Moscon (ITA)	(Team Sky)

The 2017 Il Lombardia was a road cycling one-day race that took place on 7 October. It was the 111th edition of the Il Lombardia and the 36th event of the 2017 UCI World Tour. It was won for the second time by Vincenzo Nibali. The race was marred by several severe accidents, all on the fast and technical descent of the Sormano hill. Laurens De Plus (Quick-Step Floors) suffered a small fracture to his right knee when he was launched over the guardrail and fell into a ravine. Jan Bakelants (AG2R La Mondiale) remained hospitalised in Como with seven broken ribs and two fractures to his spine. Simone Petilli (UAE Team Emirates) was diagnosed after his crash at the same site with two back fractures, a broken collarbone and shoulder blade.

== Results ==
Result
Rank	Rider	Team	Time
1	Vincenzo Nibali (ITA)	Bahrain–Merida	6h 15' 29"
2	Julian Alaphilippe (FRA)	Quick-Step Floors	+ 28"
3	Gianni Moscon (ITA)	Team Sky	+ 38"
4	Alexis Vuillermoz (FRA)	AG2R La Mondiale	+ 38"
5	Thibaut Pinot (FRA)	FDJ	+ 38"
6	Domenico Pozzovivo (ITA)	AG2R La Mondiale	+ 38"
7	Fabio Aru (ITA)	Astana	+ 38"
8	Mikel Nieve (ESP)	Team Sky	+ 40"
9	Nairo Quintana (COL)	Movistar Team	+ 42"
10	Sergey Chernetskiy (RUS)	Astana	+ 47"
