= 2008 Giro del Trentino =

Race details
- Dates: 22–25 April 2008
- Stages: 4
- Distance: 540.98 km (336.1 mi)
- Winning time: 14h 01' 09"

Results
	Winner	Vincenzo Nibali (ITA)
	Second	Stefano Garzelli (ITA)
	Third	Domenico Pozzovivo (ITA)

The 2008 Giro del Trentino was the 32nd edition of the Tour of the Alps cycle race and was held on 22 April to 25 April 2008. The race started in Arco and finished in Peio Terme. The race was won by Vincenzo Nibali.

== General classification ==
Final general classification

Rank	Rider	Time
1	Vincenzo Nibali (ITA)	14h 01' 09"
2	Stefano Garzelli (ITA)	+ 15"
3	Domenico Pozzovivo (ITA)	+ 31"
4	Jure Golčer (SLO)	+ 33"
5	Francesco Bellotti (ITA)	+ 34"
6	Fortunato Baliani (ITA)	+ 43"
7	Emanuele Sella (ITA)	+ 48"
8	Sylwester Szmyd (POL)	+ 50"
9	José Serpa (COL)	+ 51"
10	Evgeni Petrov (RUS)	+ 58"
