= 2016 Tour of Oman =

UCI Asia Tour

Race details
- Dates: 16–21 February 2016
- Stages: 6
- Distance: 911 km (566 mi)

Results
Jersey awarded to the overall winner	Winner	Vincenzo Nibali (ITA)	(Astana Pro Team)
	Second	Romain Bardet (FRA)	(AG2R La Mondiale)
	Third	Jakob Fuglsang (DEN)	(Astana Pro Team)
Jersey awarded to the points classification winner	Points	Edvald Boasson Hagen (NOR)	(Dimension Data)
Jersey awarded to the young rider classification winner	Young rider	Brendan Canty (AUS)	(Drapac Professional Cycling)
Jersey awarded to the combativity classification winner	Combativity	Jacques Janse van Rensburg (RSA)	(Dimension Data)
	Team	Dimension Data	

The 2016 Tour of Oman was a road cycling stage race that took place between 16 and 21 February 2016 in Oman. It was the seventh edition of the Tour of Oman and is rated as a 2.HC race as part of the 2016 UCI Asia Tour. The previous year's champion, Rafael Valls, was not present to defend his title.

== Teams ==
Eighteen teams were invited to take part in the race. These included nine UCI WorldTeams and nine UCI Professional Continental teams.

UCI WorldTeams

- Team Katusha
- Team Dimension Data
- Team Giant–Alpecin
- Etixx–Quick-Step
- BMC Racing Team
- LottoNL–Jumbo
- Lampre–Merida
- Astana
- AG2R La Mondiale

UCI Professional Continental teams

- Wanty–Groupe Gobert
- Roompot–Oranje Peloton
- Fortuneo–Vital Concept
- Bora–Argon 18
- Drapac Professional Cycling
- Topsport Vlaanderen–Baloise
- Stölting Service Group
- UnitedHealthcare
- CCC–Sprandi–Polkowice

== Pre-race favourites ==
The Tour of Oman comes towards the beginning of the road cycling season. It follows two other races in the Middle East: the Dubai Tour and the Tour of Qatar, which in 2016 were won by Marcel Kittel (Etixx–Quick-Step) and Mark Cavendish (Team Dimension Data respectively. The Dubai Tour and the Tour of Qatar are focused particularly on sprinters and classics riders, but the Tour of Oman is an opportunity for the climbers to compete for overall victory, with the climb of Jebel Akhdar normally decisive. Many riders who compete for the Grand Tours and the Ardennes classics start the race as part of their preparation, although increased competition from early-season European races meant that the start list for the 2016 Tour of Oman was not as strong as in some previous editions.

The champion of the 2015 edition was Rafael Valls, who was then riding for Lampre–Merida but had moved to Lotto–Soudal for the 2016 season. Lotto–Soudal was not among the teams invited to the race, so Valls was not present to defend his title. In his absence, the contenders for overall victory included Vincenzo Nibali (Astana), who had won on Jebel Akhdar in 2012, and Richie Porte (BMC Racing Team), who had won the queen stage of the Tour Down Under. Other strong riders included the AG2R La Mondiale riders Romain Bardet and Domenico Pozzovivo, Team Giant–Alpecin's Tom Dumoulin, Etixx–Quick-Step's Dan Martin, Lampre–Merida's Rui Costa and Fortuneo–Vital Concept's Eduardo Sepúlveda.

The varied stages in the Tour of Oman meant that several different kinds of riders started the race. These included sprinters such as Sam Bennett (Bora–Argon 18), Alexander Kristoff (Team Katusha), Sacha Modolo (Lampre–Merida), Andrea Guardini (Astana) and Moreno Hofland (LottoNL–Jumbo). The hilly finishes also attracted classics riders such as Greg Van Avermaet (BMC), Davide Rebellin (CCC–Sprandi–Polkowice) and Edvald Boasson Hagen (Team Dimension Data).

== Route ==
The 2016 race is scheduled to include six stages. This included one flat stage, three hilly stages, one stage with an uphill finish to Qurayyat and the queen stage finishing on Jebel Akhdar (the Green Mountain) where previous editions of the race have been decided. The climb of Jebel Akhdar was extended from previous races: it continued 1.8 kilometres (1.1 mi) from the former finish line up to the top of the climb.

Stage schedule
Stage	Date	Route	Distance	Type	Winner
1	16 February	Oman Exhibition Center to Al Bustan	145.5 km (90 mi)	Hilly stage	Bob Jungels (LUX)
2	17 February	Omantel Head Office to Qurayyat	162 km (101 mi)	Hilly stage	Edvald Boasson Hagen (NOR)
3	18 February	Al Sawadi Beach to Naseem Park	176.5 km (110 mi)	Flat stage	Alexander Kristoff (NOR)
4	19 February	Muscat to Jebel Akhdar	177 km (110 mi)	Mountain stage	Vincenzo Nibali (ITA)
5	20 February	Yiti to Ministry of Tourism	119.5 km (74 mi)	Hilly stage	Edvald Boasson Hagen (NOR)
6	21 February	Muscat to Matrah Corniche	130.5 km (81 mi)	Hilly stage	Alexander Kristoff (NOR)

== Classification leadership ==
There were five principal classifications in the 2016 Tour of Oman.

The first and most important was the general classification; the winner of this is considered the overall winner of the race. It is calculated by adding together each rider's times on each stage, then applying bonuses. Bonuses are awarded for coming in the top three on a stage (10 seconds for the winner, 6 seconds for the second placed rider and 4 seconds for the rider in third) or at intermediate sprints (3 seconds, 2 seconds and 1 second for the top three riders). The rider in the lead of the general classification wears a red jersey.

The second competition is the points classification. This is calculated by awarding points for the top 10 riders at the finish of each stage (15 points to the winner down to 1 point for the rider in tenth place) and to the top three at intermediate sprints (3 points, 2 points and 1 point). The rider with the highest points total is the leader of the classification and wears a green jersey.

The young rider classification is open to those born on or after 1 January 1990. The young rider ranked highest in the general classification is the leader of the young rider classification and wears a white jersey.

The combativity classification is based on points won at intermediate sprints and classified climbs along the route. Points are awarded to the top three riders across each sprint or climb (3 points, 2 points and 1 point). The rider with the most accumulated points is the leader of the classification and wears a white jersey with red and green sections.

The final competition is the team classification. On each stage, each team is awarded a time based on the cumulative time of its top three riders. The times for each stage are then added together and the team with the lowest total time is the leader of the team classification. There is no jersey awarded for this classification.

Classification leadership by stage
Stage	Winner	General classification	Points classification	Young rider classification	Combativity classification	Team classification
1	Bob Jungels	Bob Jungels	Bob Jungels	Bob Jungels	Amaury Capiot	Team Dimension Data
2	Edvald Boasson Hagen	Edvald Boasson Hagen	Edvald Boasson Hagen	Patrick Konrad	Amaury Capiot	Team Dimension Data
3	Alexander Kristoff	Edvald Boasson Hagen	Edvald Boasson Hagen	Patrick Konrad	Kenny Dehaes	Team Dimension Data
4	Vincenzo Nibali	Vincenzo Nibali	Vincenzo Nibali	Brendan Canty	Kenny Dehaes	Team Dimension Data
5	Edvald Boasson Hagen	Vincenzo Nibali	Edvald Boasson Hagen	Brendan Canty	Jacques Janse van Rensburg	Team Dimension Data
6	Alexander Kristoff	Vincenzo Nibali	Edvald Boasson Hagen	Brendan Canty	Jacques Janse van Rensburg	Team Dimension Data
Final		Vincenzo Nibali	Edvald Boasson Hagen	Brendan Canty	Jacques Janse van Rensburg	Team Dimension Data
