= 2009 Critérium du Dauphiné Libéré =

2009 UCI World Ranking, race 15 of 24

Race details
- Dates: 7–14 June 2009
- Stages: 8
- Distance: 1,030 km (640 mi)
- Winning time: 26h 33' 15"

Results
Jersey awarded to the overall winner	Winner	Alejandro Valverde (ESP)	(Caisse d'Epargne)
	Second	Cadel Evans (AUS)	(Silence–Lotto)
	Third	Alberto Contador (ESP)	(Astana)
Jersey awarded to the points classification winner	Points	Cadel Evans (AUS)	(Silence–Lotto)
Jersey awarded to the mountains classification winner	Mountains	Pierrick Fédrigo (FRA)	(Bbox Bouygues Telecom)
	Team	Astana	

The 2009 Critérium du Dauphiné Libéré was the 61st edition of the Critérium du Dauphiné Libéré stage race. It took place from 7 June to 14 June, and was part of both the 2009 UCI ProTour and the inaugural World Calendar. It began in Nancy, France with an individual time trial, and ended in Grenoble. It began with a time trial, two flat stages and another time trial, and ended with four consecutive mountain stages.

== Teams ==
As the Dauphiné Libéré is a UCI ProTour event, the 18 ProTour teams are invited automatically. They were joined by BMC Racing Team, a Professional Continental team, to form the event's 19-team peloton.

The 19 teams invited to the race are:

- Ag2r–La Mondiale
- Astana
- Bbox Bouygues Telecom
- BMC Racing Team
- Caisse d'Epargne
- Cofidis
- Euskaltel–Euskadi
- Française des Jeux
- Fuji–Servetto
- Garmin–Slipstream
- Lampre–NGC
- Liquigas
- Quick-Step
- Rabobank
- Silence–Lotto
- Team Columbia–High Road
- Team Katusha
- Team Milram
- Team Saxo Bank

== Route ==
Stage characteristics and winners
Stage	Date	Course	Distance	Type	Winner
1	7 June	Nancy	12.1 km (7.5 mi)	Individual time trial	Cadel Evans (AUS)
2	8 June	Nancy to Dijon	228 km (142 mi)	Flat stage	Angelo Furlan (ITA)
3	9 June	Tournus to Saint-Étienne	182 km (113 mi)	Flat stage	Niki Terpstra (NED)
4	10 June	Bourg-lès-Valence to Valence	42.4 km (26.3 mi)	Individual time trial	Bert Grabsch (GER)
5	11 June	Valence to Mont Ventoux	154 km (96 mi)	High mountain stage	Sylwester Szmyd (POL)
6	12 June	Gap to Briançon	106 km (66 mi)	High mountain stage	Pierrick Fédrigo (FRA)
7	13 June	Briançon to Saint-François-Longchamp	157 km (98 mi)	High mountain stage	David Moncoutié (FRA)
8	14 June	Faverges to Grenoble	146 km (91 mi)	Medium mountain stage	Stef Clement (NED)

== Stages ==
=== Stage 1 ===
7 June 2009 – Nancy, 12.1 km (7.5 mi) (ITT)

The course for the opening individual time trial was mostly flat, with the category four Côte du Haut-du-Lièvre coming after 3 km (1.9 mi). Three of the favourites for the final classification took the podium places, benefiting from improving weather after Iván Gutiérrez had held the lead for nearly an hour.

Stage 1 Results

	Cyclist	Team	Time
1	Cadel Evans (AUS)	Silence–Lotto	15' 36"
2	Alberto Contador (ESP)	Astana	+ 8"
3	Alejandro Valverde (ESP)	Caisse d'Epargne	+ 23"
4	Sébastien Rosseler (BEL)	Quick-Step	+ 33"
5	Vincenzo Nibali (ITA)	Liquigas	+ 34"

General Classification after Stage 1

	Cyclist	Team	Time
1	Cadel Evans (AUS)	Silence–Lotto	15' 36"
2	Alberto Contador (ESP)	Astana	+ 8"
3	Alejandro Valverde (ESP)	Caisse d'Epargne	+ 23"
4	Sébastien Rosseler (BEL)	Quick-Step	+ 33"
5	Vincenzo Nibali (ITA)	Liquigas	+ 34"

=== Stage 2 ===
8 June 2009 – Nancy to Dijon, 228 km (142 mi)

This was the longest stage of the 2009 Dauphiné, and its profile is mostly flat. It saw very gentle undulation until the fairly steep descent from the category four Côte de Montcharvot, 100 km (62 mi) from the finish. There was one other fourth-category climb on the stage. A group of five riders held an advantage over the peloton that reached more than six minutes, but they were caught in the last 10 km (6.2 mi). David Millar attempted a late escape, but he was overhauled by the sprinters, including stage winner Angelo Furlan.

Stage 2 Results

	Cyclist	Team	Time
1	Angelo Furlan (ITA)	Lampre–NGC	5h 35' 04"
2	Markus Zberg (SUI)	BMC Racing Team	s.t.
3	Tom Boonen (BEL)	Quick-Step	s.t.
4	Marco Bandiera (ITA)	Lampre–NGC	s.t.
5	Marcel Sieberg (GER)	Team Columbia–High Road	s.t.

General Classification after Stage 2

	Cyclist	Team	Time
1	Cadel Evans (AUS)	Silence–Lotto	5h 50' 40"
2	Alberto Contador (ESP)	Astana	+ 8"
3	Alejandro Valverde (ESP)	Caisse d'Epargne	+ 23"
4	Sébastien Rosseler (BEL)	Quick-Step	+ 33"
5	Vincenzo Nibali (ITA)	Liquigas	+ 34"

=== Stage 3 ===
9 June 2009 – Tournus to Saint-Étienne, 182 km (113 mi)

This was another largely flat stage, with four small category four climbs, including a relatively steep (though short) one about 40 km (25 mi) from the finish. A group of five riders escaped after 34 km (21 mi), and were able to stay more than a minute and a half clear of the main group to the finish. Niki Terpstra won in a sprint finish over his fellow escapees, and took the yellow leader's jersey from Cadel Evans.

Stage 3 Results

	Cyclist	Team	Time
1	Niki Terpstra (NED)	Team Milram	4h 32' 34"
2	Ludovic Turpin (FRA)	Ag2r–La Mondiale	s.t.
3	Yuri Trofimov (RUS)	Bbox Bouygues Telecom	s.t.
4	Rémi Pauriol (FRA)	Cofidis	s.t.
5	~~Iñigo Landaluze (ESP)~~ (Note: Tested positive for CERA during this race and was consequently removed from the results.)	~~Euskaltel–Euskadi~~	s.t.

General Classification after Stage 3

	Cyclist	Team	Time
1	Niki Terpstra (NED)	Team Milram	10h 23' 45"
2	Rémi Pauriol (FRA)	Cofidis	+ 26"
3	Yuri Trofimov (RUS)	Bbox Bouygues Telecom	+ 27"
4	Ludovic Turpin (FRA)	Ag2r–La Mondiale	+ 36"
5	Cadel Evans (AUS)	Silence–Lotto	+ 1' 01"

=== Stage 4 ===
10 June 2009 – Bourg-lès-Valence to Valence, 42.4 km (26.3 mi) (ITT)

The second individual time trial is very similar to the first in profile, featuring only a single fourth-category climb. Bert Grabsch, the current time trial world champion, won the stage. Cadel Evans won the yellow jersey back beating last stage's yellow jersey winner Niki Terpstra, who fell and finished on a replacement bike, by over 5 minutes.

Stage 4 Results

	Cyclist	Team	Time
1	Bert Grabsch (GER)	Team Columbia–High Road	51' 26"
2	Cadel Evans (AUS)	Silence–Lotto	+ 7"
3	David Millar (GBR)	Garmin–Slipstream	+ 39"
4	František Raboň (CZE)	Team Columbia–High Road	+ 40"
5	Alberto Contador (ESP)	Astana	+ 52"

General Classification after Stage 4

	Cyclist	Team	Time
1	Cadel Evans (AUS)	Silence–Lotto	11h 16' 19"
2	Alberto Contador (ESP)	Astana	+ 45"
3	Bert Grabsch (GER)	Team Columbia–High Road	+ 48"
4	František Raboň (CZE)	Team Columbia–High Road	+ 1' 07"
5	David Millar (GBR)	Garmin–Slipstream	+ 1' 09"

=== Stage 5 ===
11 June 2009 – Valence to Mont Ventoux, 154 km (96 mi)

The first of the 2009 Dauphiné's four straight mountain stages sees the peloton ascend to the peak colloquially known as "Mount Baldy", some six weeks before the mountain hosts a critical stage finish in the 2009 Tour de France. There are three fourth-category climbs and a third-category climb on course, while the finish itself to Mont Ventoux is an Hors Categorie, or outside categorization climb. Sylwester Szmyd and Alejandro Valverde managed to break away on the ascent of Mount Ventoux, and worked to gain over a minute lead to Haimar Zubeldia. Szmyd took the stage win, while Valverde took the yellow jersey from Cadel Evans, who finished just over 2 minutes behind. After the stage, Ivan Basso dropped out.

Stage 5 Results

	Cyclist	Team	Time
1	Sylwester Szmyd (POL)	Liquigas	4h 05' 04"
2	Alejandro Valverde (ESP)	Caisse d'Epargne	s.t.
3	Haimar Zubeldia (ESP)	Astana	+ 1' 14"
4	Robert Gesink (NED)	Rabobank	+ 1' 50"
5	Jakob Fuglsang (DEN)	Team Saxo Bank	+ 1' 59"

General Classification after Stage 5

	Cyclist	Team	Time
1	Alejandro Valverde (ESP)	Caisse d'Epargne	15h 23' 17"
2	Cadel Evans (AUS)	Silence–Lotto	+ 16"
3	Alberto Contador (ESP)	Astana	+ 1' 04"
4	David Millar (GBR)	Garmin–Slipstream	+ 1' 43"
5	Haimar Zubeldia (ESP)	Astana	+ 2' 21"

=== Stage 6 ===
12 June 2009 – Gap to Briançon, 106 km (66 mi)

This short stage features another outside categorization climb, the Col d'Izoard, which is visited 20 km (12 mi) before the finish line. The fourth-category Côte du Châteauroux-les-Alpes is visited earlier on in the stage, and the finish into Briançon is also a categorized climb. Fourteen men formed a breakaway early in the stage, and Pierrick Fédrigo, Jurgen Van de Walle, Stéphane Goubert and Juan Manuel Gárate broke free of the lead group on the ascent on Col d'Izoard. Fédrigo won the stage, and Alejandro Valverde finished together with Cadel Evans, defending the yellow jersey.

Stage 6 Results

	Cyclist	Team	Time
1	Pierrick Fédrigo (FRA)	Bbox Bouygues Telecom	2h 48' 17"
2	Jurgen Van de Walle (BEL)	Quick-Step	+ 4"
3	Stéphane Goubert (FRA)	Ag2r–La Mondiale	+ 5"
4	Juan Manuel Gárate (ESP)	Rabobank	+ 14"
5	Lars Bak (DEN)	Team Saxo Bank	+ 25"

General Classification after Stage 6

	Cyclist	Team	Time
1	Alejandro Valverde (ESP)	Caisse d'Epargne	18h 15' 46"
2	Cadel Evans (AUS)	Silence–Lotto	+ 16"
3	Alberto Contador (ESP)	Astana	+ 1' 04"
4	Mikel Astarloza (ESP)	Euskaltel–Euskadi	+ 1' 49"
5	David Millar (GBR)	Garmin–Slipstream	+ 1' 52"

=== Stage 7 ===
13 June 2009 – Briançon to Saint-François-Longchamp, 157 km (98 mi)

This is the queen stage of the 2009 Dauphiné Libéré, with two outside categorization climbs on course and a first-category climb to the finish in Saint-François-Longchamp. The first of those outside categorization climbs is the Col du Galibier, which at 2,556 m (8,386 ft) is the highest point of the 2009 Dauphiné.

Stage 7 Results

	Cyclist	Team	Time
1	David Moncoutié (FRA)	Cofidis	4h 44' 26"
2	Robert Gesink (NED)	Rabobank	+ 41"
3	Cadel Evans (AUS)	Silence–Lotto	+ 41"
4	Alejandro Valverde (ESP)	Caisse d'Epargne	+ 41"
5	Jakob Fuglsang (DEN)	Team Saxo Bank	+ 53"

General Classification after Stage 7

	Cyclist	Team	Time
1	Alejandro Valverde (ESP)	Caisse d'Epargne	23h 00' 53"
2	Cadel Evans (AUS)	Silence–Lotto	+ 16"
3	Alberto Contador (ESP)	Astana	+ 1' 18"
4	Robert Gesink (NED)	Rabobank	+ 2' 41"
5	Mikel Astarloza (ESP)	Euskaltel–Euskadi	+ 3' 40"

=== Stage 8 ===
14 June 2009 – Faverges to Grenoble, 146 km (91 mi)

This is branded as a mountain stage, but it is significantly less imposing than the previous three stages. There are two third-category climbs within the first 57 km (35 mi) of the stage, along with the first-category Montée de Saint-Bernard-du-Touvet coming 27 km (17 mi) from the finish. After a rapid descent from that climb, there is a stretch of 12 km (7.5 mi) to the finish that is mostly flat.

Stage 8 Results

	Cyclist	Team	Time
1	Stef Clement (NED)	Rabobank	3h 30' 17"
2	Timmy Duggan (USA)	Garmin–Slipstream	s.t.
3	Sébastien Joly (FRA)	Française des Jeux	+ 2"
4	Adam Hansen (AUS)	Team Columbia–High Road	+ 1' 31"
5	Aleksandr Kuschynski (BLR)	Liquigas	+ 1' 31"

Final General Classification

	Cyclist	Team	Time
1	Alejandro Valverde (ESP)	Caisse d'Epargne	26h 33' 15"
2	Cadel Evans (AUS)	Silence–Lotto	+ 16"
3	Alberto Contador (ESP)	Astana	+ 1' 18"
4	Robert Gesink (NED)	Rabobank	+ 2' 41"
5	Mikel Astarloza (ESP)	Euskaltel–Euskadi	+ 3' 40"

== Classification leadership progress table ==
Stage	Winner	General classification	Mountains classification	Points classification	Team Classification
1	Cadel Evans	Cadel Evans	Cadel Evans	Cadel Evans	Silence–Lotto
2	Angelo Furlan	Cadel Evans	Alexandre Pichot	Cadel Evans	Silence–Lotto
3	Niki Terpstra	Niki Terpstra	Rémi Pauriol	Niki Terpstra	Team Milram
4	Bert Grabsch	Cadel Evans	Rémi Pauriol	Cadel Evans	Team Columbia–High Road
5	Sylwester Szmyd	Alejandro Valverde	Sylwester Szmyd	Cadel Evans	Astana
6	Pierrick Fédrigo	Alejandro Valverde	Pierrick Fédrigo	Cadel Evans	Astana
7	David Moncoutié	Alejandro Valverde	Pierrick Fédrigo	Cadel Evans	Astana
8	Stef Clement	Alejandro Valverde	Pierrick Fédrigo	Cadel Evans	Astana
Final		Alejandro Valverde	Pierrick Fédrigo	Cadel Evans	Astana

== Results ==
=== General classification ===
	Cyclist	Team	Time
1	Alejandro Valverde (ESP)	Caisse d'Epargne	26h 33' 15"
2	Cadel Evans (AUS)	Silence–Lotto	+ 16"
3	Alberto Contador (ESP)	Astana	+ 1' 18"
4	Robert Gesink (NED)	Rabobank	+ 2' 41"
5	Mikel Astarloza (ESP)	Euskaltel–Euskadi	+ 3' 40"

=== Points classification ===
	Cyclist	Team	Points
1	Cadel Evans (AUS)	Silence–Lotto	97
2	Alberto Contador (ESP)	Astana	66
3	Alejandro Valverde (ESP)	Caisse d'Epargne	59
4	David Millar (GBR)	Garmin–Slipstream	43
5	Markus Zberg (SUI)	BMC Racing Team	42

=== Climbers' classification ===
	Cyclist	Team	Points
1	Pierrick Fédrigo (FRA)	Bbox Bouygues Telecom	111
2	David Moncoutié (FRA)	Cofidis	88
3	Juan Manuel Gárate (ESP)	Rabobank	71
4	Christophe Kern (FRA)	Cofidis	57
5	Alejandro Valverde (ESP)	Caisse d'Epargne	53

=== Team classification ===
	Team	Time
1	Astana	79h 58' 20"
2	Rabobank	+ 4' 41"
3	Ag2r–La Mondiale	+ 5' 56"
4	Euskaltel–Euskadi	+ 6' 27"
5	Française des Jeux	+ 18' 33"
