= 2012 Giro del Trentino =

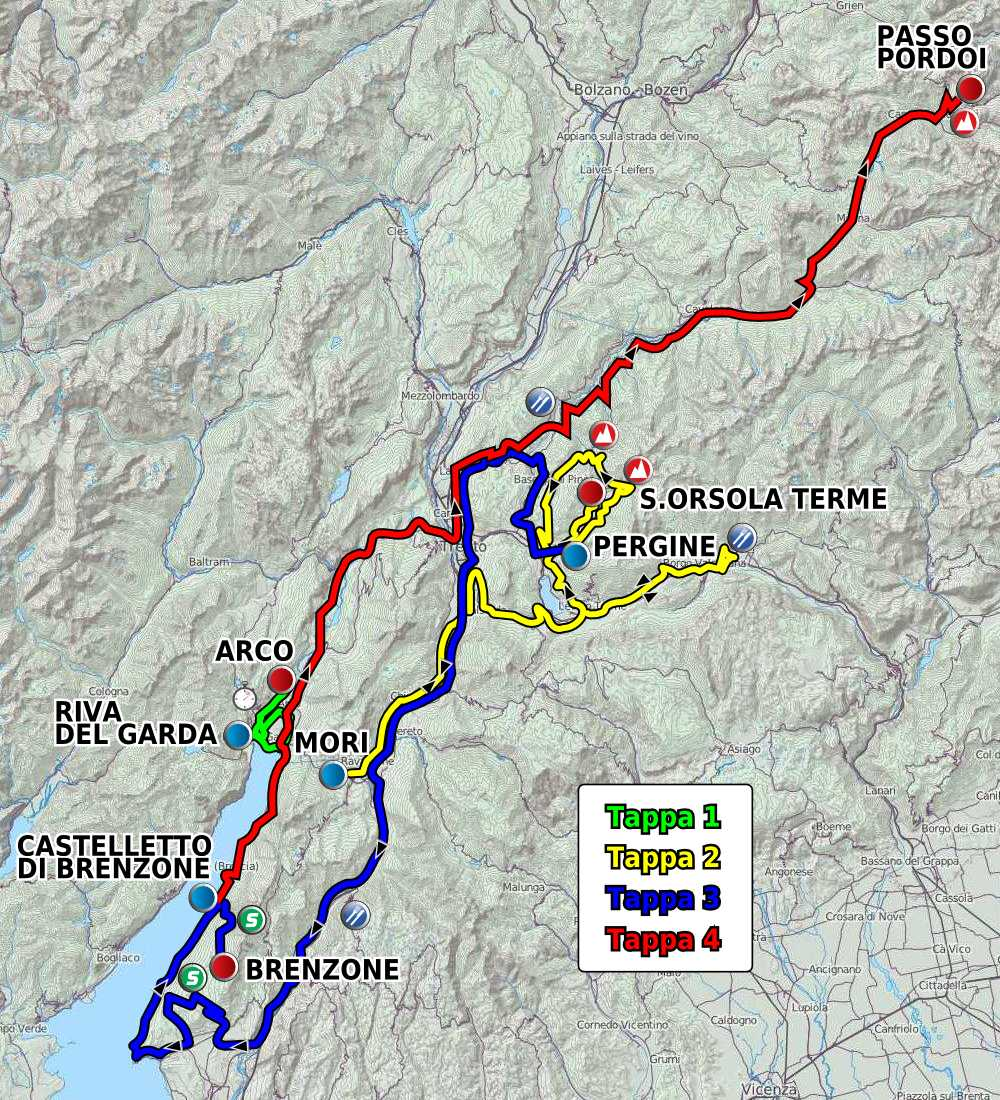

Race details
- Dates: 17–20 April
- Stages: 4
- Distance: 506.6 km (314.8 mi)
- Winning time: 12h 57' 47"

Results
Jersey awarded to the overall winner	Winner	Domenico Pozzovivo (ITA)	(Colnago–CSF Bardiani)
	Second	Damiano Cunego (ITA)	(Lampre–ISD)
	Third	Sylvester Szmyd (POL)	(Liquigas–Cannondale)
Jersey awarded to the points classification winner	Points	Marco Frapporti (ITA)	(Team Idea)
Jersey awarded to the mountains classification winner	Mountains	Domenico Pozzovivo (ITA)	(Colnago–CSF Bardiani)
Jersey awarded to the youth classification winner	Youth	Carlos Alberto Betancur (COL)	(Acqua & Sapone)
	Team	Androni Giocattoli–Venezuela	

The 2012 Giro del Trentino was the 36th edition of the Giro del Trentino cycling stage race. It was held from 17–20 April 2011, and was rated as a 2.HC event on the 2012 UCI Europe Tour. It was won by Colnago–CSF Bardiani's rider Domenico Pozzovivo.

== Tour stages ==
=== Stage 1 ===
17 April 2012 – Riva del Garda to Arco, 14.3 km (8.9 mi) (team time trial)

Stage 1 results

	Team	Time
1	BMC Racing Team	15' 50"
2	Astana	+ 10"
3	Colnago–CSF Bardiani	+ 13"
4	Androni Giocattoli–Venezuela	+ 15"
5	Acqua & Sapone	+ 16"
6	Liquigas–Cannondale	+ 19"
7	Lampre–ISD	+ 23"
8	Team NetApp	+ 24"
9	Utensilnord–Named	+ 38"
10	SpiderTech–C10	+ 44"

General Classification after Stage 1

	Cyclist	Team	Time
1	Taylor Phinney (USA)	BMC Racing Team	15' 50"
2	Alessandro Ballan (ITA)	BMC Racing Team	+ 0"
3	Marco Pinotti (ITA)	BMC Racing Team	+ 0"
4	Yannick Eijssen (BEL)	BMC Racing Team	+ 0"
5	Mathias Frank (SUI)	BMC Racing Team	+ 0"
6	Ivan Santaromita (ITA)	BMC Racing Team	+ 5"
7	Roman Kreuziger (CZE)	Astana	+ 10"
8	Janez Brajkovič (SLO)	Astana	+ 10"
9	Kevin Seeldraeyers (BEL)	Astana	+ 10"
10	Paolo Tiralongo (ITA)	Astana	+ 10"

=== Stage 2 ===
18 April 2012 – Mori to Sant'Orsola Terme, 149.8 km (93.1 mi)

Stage 2 results

	Cyclist	Team	Time
1	Damiano Cunego (ITA)	Lampre–ISD	3h 59' 30"
2	Carlos Betancur (COL)	Acqua & Sapone	s.t.
3	Roman Kreuziger (CZE)	Astana	s.t.
4	Eros Capecchi (ITA)	Liquigas–Cannondale	+ 3"
5	Francesco Reda (ITA)	Acqua & Sapone	+ 3"
6	Hubert Dupont (FRA)	Ag2r–La Mondiale	+ 3"
7	Mathias Frank (SUI)	BMC Racing Team	+ 3"
8	Marc de Maar (AHO)	UnitedHealthcare	+ 8"
9	Alessandro Bisolti (ITA)	Team Idea	+ 8"
10	Bartosz Huzarski (POL)	Team NetApp	+ 8"

General Classification after Stage 2

	Cyclist	Team	Time
1	Mathias Frank (SUI)	BMC Racing Team	4h 15' 23"
2	Roman Kreuziger (CZE)	Astana	+ 3"
3	Carlos Betancur (COL)	Acqua & Sapone	+ 7"
4	Marco Pinotti (ITA)	BMC Racing Team	+ 9"
5	Damiano Cunego (ITA)	Lampre–ISD	+ 10"
6	Francesco Reda (ITA)	Acqua & Sapone	+ 16"
7	Eros Capecchi (ITA)	Liquigas–Cannondale	+ 19"
8	Miguel Ángel Rubiano (COL)	Androni Giocattoli–Venezuela	+ 27"
9	Bartosz Huzarski (POL)	Team NetApp	+ 29"
10	Michele Scarponi (ITA)	Lampre–ISD	+ 34"

=== Stage 3 ===
19 April 2012 – Pergine to Brenzone, 165.5 km (102.8 mi)

Stage 3 results

	Cyclist	Team	Time
1	Domenico Pozzovivo (ITA)	Colnago–CSF Bardiani	4h 4' 26"
2	Sylvester Szmyd (POL)	Liquigas–Cannondale	+ 23"
3	Damiano Cunego (ITA)	Lampre–ISD	+ 1' 12"
4	José Rujano (VEN)	Androni Giocattoli–Venezuela	+ 1' 20"
5	Roman Kreuziger (CZE)	Astana	+ 1' 40"
6	Hubert Dupont (FRA)	Ag2r–La Mondiale	+ 2' 07"
7	Bartosz Huzarski (POL)	Team NetApp	+ 2' 12"
8	José Serpa (COL)	Androni Giocattoli–Venezuela	+ 2' 12"
9	Janez Brajkovič (SLO)	Astana	+ 2' 12"
10	Carlos Betancur (COL)	Acqua & Sapone	+ 2' 34"

General Classification after Stage 3

	Cyclist	Team	Time
1	Domenico Pozzovivo (ITA)	Colnago–CSF Bardiani	8h 20' 42"
2	Damiano Cunego (ITA)	Lampre–ISD	+ 25"
3	Sylvester Szmyd (POL)	Liquigas–Cannondale	+ 49"
4	Roman Kreuziger (CZE)	Astana	+ 50"
5	Mathias Frank (SUI)	BMC Racing Team	+ 1' 42"
6	Carlos Betancur (COL)	Acqua & Sapone	+ 1' 47"
7	Bartosz Huzarski (POL)	Team NetApp	+ 1' 48"
8	José Rujano (VEN)	Androni Giocattoli–Venezuela	+ 1' 48"
9	Marco Pinotti (ITA)	BMC Racing Team	+ 1' 51"
10	Hubert Dupont (FRA)	Ag2r–La Mondiale	+ 2' 06"

=== Stage 4 ===
20 April 2012 – Castelletto Di Brenzone to Passo Pordoi, 177 km (110.0 mi)

Stage 4 results

	Cyclist	Team	Time
1	Darwin Atapuma (COL)	Colombia–Coldeportes	4h 37' 03"
2	Carlos Betancur (COL)	Acqua & Sapone	+ 3"
3	Domenico Pozzovivo (ITA)	Colnago–CSF Bardiani	+ 6"
4	Sylvester Szmyd (POL)	Liquigas–Cannondale	+ 17"
5	Damiano Cunego (ITA)	Lampre–ISD	+ 17"
6	José Rujano (VEN)	Androni Giocattoli–Venezuela	+ 21"
7	Hubert Dupont (FRA)	Ag2r–La Mondiale	+ 30"
8	Kevin Seeldraeyers (BEL)	Astana	+ 1' 06"
9	Miguel Ángel Rubiano (COL)	Androni Giocattoli–Venezuela	+ 1' 20"
10	Pierre Rolland (FRA)	Team Europcar	+ 1' 27"

General Classification after Stage 4

	Cyclist	Team	Time
1	Domenico Pozzovivo (ITA)	Colnago–CSF Bardiani	12h 57' 47"
2	Damiano Cunego (ITA)	Lampre–ISD	+ 40"
3	Sylvester Szmyd (POL)	Liquigas–Cannondale	+ 1' 04"
4	Carlos Betancur (COL)	Acqua & Sapone	+ 1' 42"
5	José Rujano (VEN)	Androni Giocattoli–Venezuela	+ 2' 07"
6	Roman Kreuziger (CZE)	Astana	+ 2' 33"
7	Hubert Dupont (FRA)	Ag2r–La Mondiale	+ 2' 34"
8	Darwin Atapuma (COL)	Colombia–Coldeportes	+ 3' 55"
9	Marco Pinotti (ITA)	BMC Racing Team	+ 4' 01"
10	Mathias Frank (SUI)	BMC Racing Team	+ 4' 05"
