= 2014 Roma Maxima =

2014 UCI Europe Tour

Race details
- Dates: March 9
- Stages: 1
- Distance: 195 km (121.2 mi)
- Winning time: 4h 45' 45"

Results
	Winner	Alejandro Valverde (Spain)	(Movistar Team)
	Second	Davide Appollonio (Italy)	(Ag2r–La Mondiale)
	Third	Sonny Colbrelli (Italy)	(Bardiani–CSF)

The 2014 Roma Maxima was the 74th edition of the international one-day cycling race Roma Maxima and the 2nd under the new name (the race was previously held as Giro del Lazio). The race started and ended in Rome.
