= Vincenzo Nibali =

Italian road racing cyclist

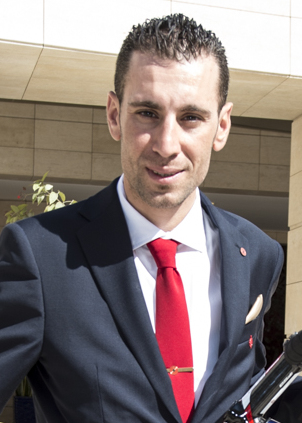
- Nibali in 2017

Personal information
- Full name: Vincenzo Nibali
- Nickname: Lo Squalo di Messina (The Shark of Messina)
- Born: 14 November 1984 (age 41) Messina, Italy
- Height: 1.81 m (5 ft 11 1/2 in)
- Weight: 65 kg (143 lb; 10 st 3 lb)

Cycling career
- Sport: Cycling
- Discipline: Road
- Role: Rider
- Rider type: Climber

Amateur team
- 2003–2004: Mastromarco–Chianti Sensi

Professional teams
- 2005: Fassa Bortolo
- 2006–2012: Liquigas
- 2013–2016: Astana
- 2017–2019: Bahrain–Merida
- 2020–2021: Trek–Segafredo
- 2022: Astana Qazaqstan Team

Managerial team
- 2023–: Q36.5 Pro Cycling Team

Major wins
- Grand Tours Tour de France General classification (2014) 6 individual stages (2014, 2015, 2019) Giro d'Italia General classification (2013, 2016) 7 individual stages (2010, 2011, 2013, 2016, 2017) 2 TTT stages (2007, 2010) Vuelta a España General classification (2010) Combination classification (2010) 2 individual stages (2010, 2017) 1 TTT stage (2013) Stage races Tirreno–Adriatico (2012, 2013) Giro del Trentino (2008, 2013) Tour of Oman (2016) One-day races and Classics National Road Race Championships (2014, 2015) Milan–San Remo (2018) Giro di Lombardia (2015, 2017) GP Ouest–France (2006) Tre Valli Varesine (2015)
Medal record
Men's road cycling
Representing Italy
World Championships
Bronze medal – third place	2004 Verona	Under-23 time trial
Bronze medal – third place	2002 Zolder/Hasselt	Junior time trial

Vincenzo Nibali (Italian pronunciation: [vinˈtʃɛntso ˈniːbali]; born 14 November 1984) is an Italian former professional road bicycle racer, who competed as a professional from 2005 to 2022. He is one of eight cyclists who have won all three of cycling's Grand Tours in their career – having won the 2010 Vuelta a España, the 2013 and 2016 Giro d'Italias, and the 2014 Tour de France.

Born near the Strait of Messina, his nickname is the "Shark of the Strait", "the Shark of Messina" or simply, "the Shark". His first major win came at the 2006 GP Ouest–France, a UCI ProTour event. However, experts such as Michele Bartoli have said Nibali is most suited to competing in multi-stage races. He is a highly capable descender and bike handler, very good climber and good time trialist. Nibali is an all-rounder, and is considered one of the strongest stage race riders of his era, having won Tirreno–Adriatico (2012 and 2013), the Giro del Trentino (2008 and 2013) and the 2016 Tour of Oman.

Nibali is most well known for his Grand Tour performances – finishing on the podium on eleven occasions – but he has proven to be a strong contender in classic cycle races as well, having won the 2014 and 2015 Italian National Road Race Championships, the 2006 GP Ouest–France and three 'Monuments' of road bicycle racing: the Giro di Lombardia in 2015 and 2017, and the 2018 Milan–San Remo. He has also achieved podiums in Liège–Bastogne–Liège and previous editions of the Milan–San Remo.

== Early life and career ==
Vincenzo Nibali was born on 14 November 1984 in Messina, Sicily, the son of Salvatore and Giovanna. In order to become a cyclist, he left his hometown Messina and moved to Tuscany at the age of sixteen. For ten months of the year, he lived in the house of his former directeur sportif, Carlo Franceschi, in Mastromarco, near Lamporecchio. Nibali finished third at the UCI World Junior Time Trial Championships in 2002 and also third at the UCI World Under-23 Time Trial Championships in 2004.

== Professional career ==
=== Liquigas (2006–12) ===
==== 2006–08 ====
Having turned professional in 2005 with Fassa Bortolo, Nibali signed with Liquigas in 2006. In that year, he won the French classic GP Ouest–France at 21 years of age. He also finished in second position overall of the 2.1 rated Settimana Internazionale di Coppi e Bartali, taking the win on the first stage. In 2007, Nibali rode the Giro d'Italia for the first time and finished 19th overall. 2008 saw Nibali finish 10th in Liège–Bastogne–Liège, obtaining also an 11th-place finish in the Giro d'Italia and a 20th-place finish in the Tour de France.

==== 2009 ====
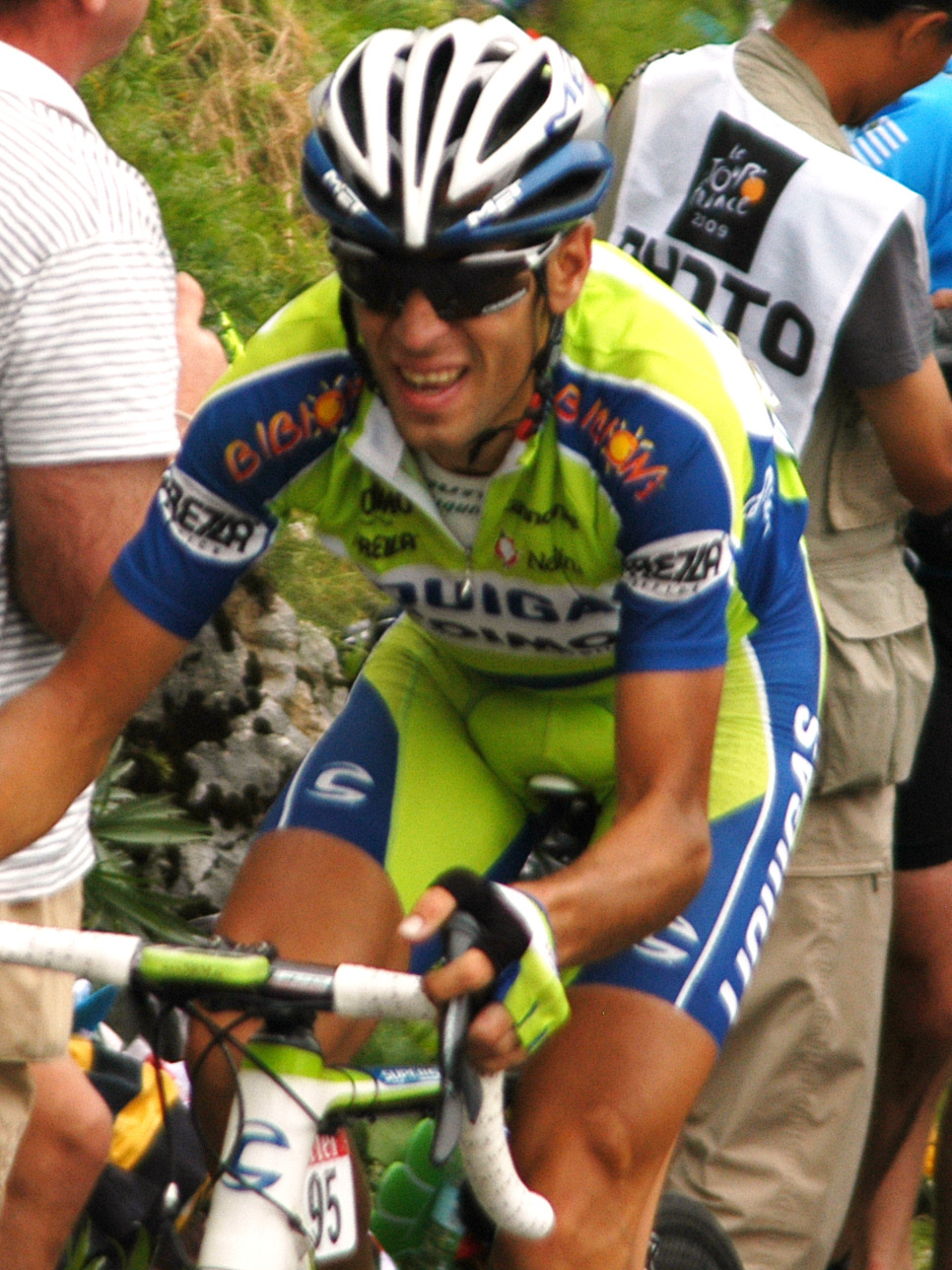
Nibali finished sixth overall in the 2009 Tour de France

2009 saw Nibali record a win in the Giro dell'Appennino where he attacked almost 50 km (31.1 mi) from the finish to win solo. Another victory in 2009 was the Gran Premio Città di Camaiore. He finished sixth overall in the Tour of California and ninth overall in Tour of the Basque Country, before sharing leadership of Liquigas at the Tour de France with Roman Kreuziger. Nibali proved the stronger of the two and finished in seventh place overall, then his best placing in a grand tour.

==== 2010 ====
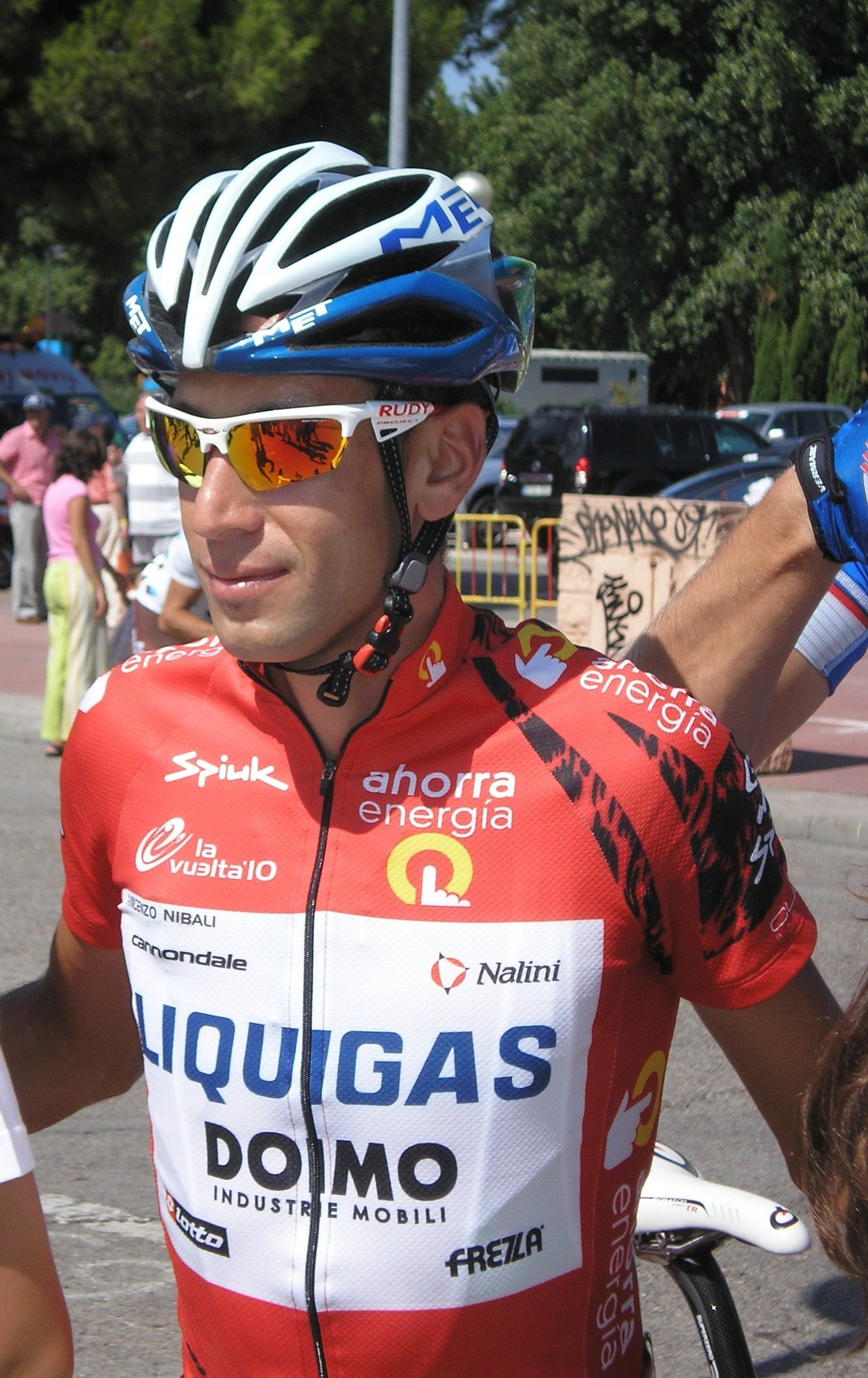
Nibali wearing the leader's jersey at the 2010 Vuelta a España. Nibali won the race overall, taking his first Grand Tour general classification victory.

Nibali began 2010 in great form by finishing first overall in the Tour de San Luis. He was a last-minute addition to Liquigas' Giro d'Italia squad following Franco Pellizotti's last minute withdrawal over Blood Passport irregularities. Nibali wore the Maglia Rosa after his Liquigas–Doimo team won the stage four team time trial, later won the 14th stage and after some good climbing through the rest of the race, he managed to finish on the podium finishing third behind his teammate Ivan Basso and David Arroyo. In June, Nibali won the Tour of Slovenia. Later in the season, Nibali won the Trofeo Melinda. Nibali won the Vuelta a España without winning a stage, thanks to consistent high placings on summit stage finishes and the race's two time trials. He had inherited the race lead after Igor Antón was forced to abandon after crashing on stage 14. Though he lost it to Joaquim Rodríguez, he later regained it on the final time trial. This marked his first grand tour victory.

==== 2011 ====
Nibali began 2011 with solid form, taking 5th overall in Tirreno–Adriatico. He also enjoyed a solid classics season, recording 8th place in Milan–Sanremo and 8th in Liège–Bastogne–Liège. Nibali was one of the favourites for the Giro d'Italia, with Ivan Basso not riding, giving him sole leadership of Liquigas. Though he entered the race as a big favorite, he could not match Alberto Contador throughout much of the mountains. He still managed to stay in the top three throughout much of the race. He finished third overall behind Alberto Contador and Michele Scarponi, with Nibali and Scarponi fighting over second in the final week when it became apparent the gap to Contador was too large (Contador was later stripped of the title, moving Nibali up to second).

Nibali was also leader of Liquigas at the Vuelta a España. On stage six, Liquigas orchestrated an escape on the descent into Córdoba, but a miscommunication saw Nibali finishing fourth, failing to take any bonus seconds. He moved to third overall on stage 11, behind Sky duo Bradley Wiggins and Chris Froome. Over the Next few stages, Nibali began to chip into the lead of Wiggins by taking time bonuses from sprints. However, stage 14 saw Nibali crack on the final climb, putting him out of contention for a podium placing. He finished seventh overall.

==== 2012 ====
Nibali began the 2012 campaign with second overall in the Tour of Oman, one second behind Peter Velits, winning the queen stage. Nibali finished first overall in the Tirreno–Adriatico after winning stage five. He also won the points classification. In March, Nibali finished third in Milan–Sanremo, his first podium finish in a monument.

On Liège–Bastogne–Liège, he broke away solo when he attacked on the descent of the Cote de la Roche aux Faucons and dropped his main challengers with 20 kilometres (12 miles) to go, but he was passed by Maxim Iglinsky (Astana) in sight of the final kilometre. He held on to finish in second place.

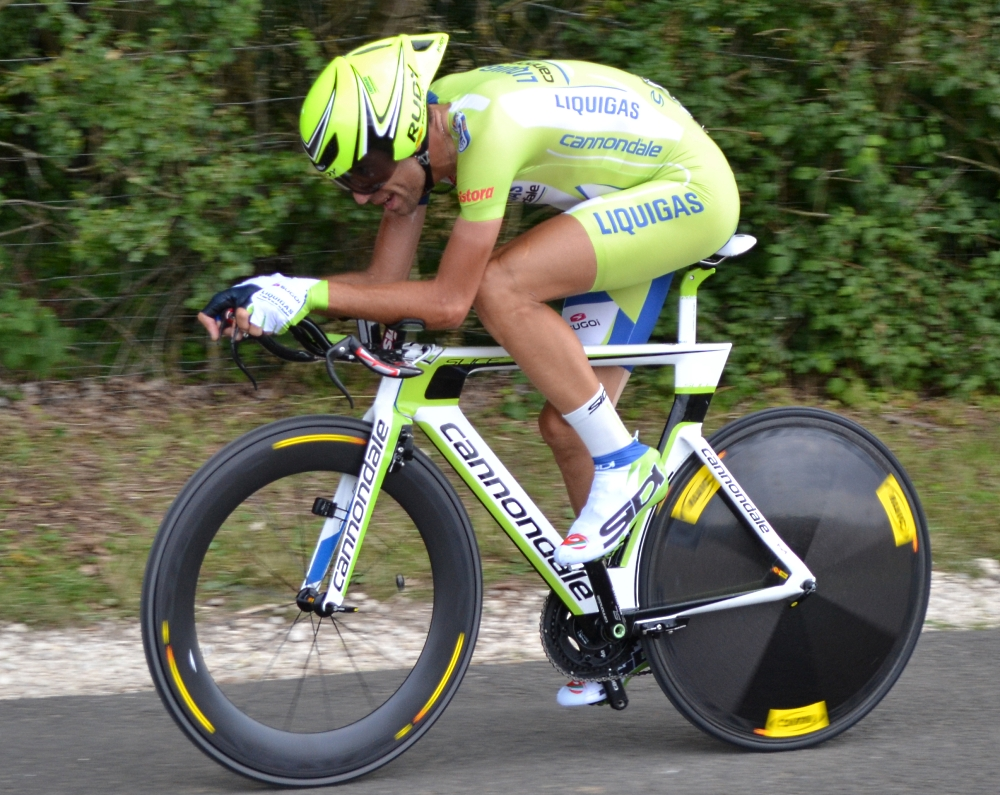
Nibali at the 2012 Tour de France

Nibali chose to focus his attention on the Tour de France, skipping the Giro d'Italia in order to prepare. After a solid first week, Nibali finished fourth on the first summit finish on stage seven to rise to third in the overall standings, sixteen seconds behind leader Wiggins and six behind defending champion Cadel Evans. However, Nibali conceded over two minutes to Wiggins in the time trial on stage nine, where he placed eighth, and slipped to fourth on the GC, behind Team Sky's Froome. On stage ten, Nibali attacked on the descent of the Col du Grand Colombier and linked up with teammate Peter Sagan, but the pair were caught by the Team Sky led peloton. Nibali went on the attack again on the following stage, which finished with a climb to La Toussuire, and put time into Wiggins and Froome, only for the pair to drag themselves back to Nibali, although he did move up to third overall after Evans lost time. He attacked again on stage 16 on the Col de Peyresourde with only Wiggins and Froome able to chase. They caught him before the summit; Nibali accelerated again but Wiggins closed the gap and the three of them finished together. Nibali lost time to Wiggins and Froome the following stage, another mountain stage, this time with a summit finish and two stages later in the final individual time trial which Wiggins won. Nibali finished third, the only rider to finish within ten minutes of Wiggins and Froome.

=== Astana (2013–16) ===
Nibali left Liquigas–Cannondale at the end of the 2012 season, and joined Astana on a two-year contract from the 2013 season onwards. The deal has been reported to be a €3 million per year contract.

==== 2013 ====
Nibali started his 2013 season in good form finishing 7th in the Tour of Oman and winning Tirreno–Adriatico. In the latter race, he took the leader's jersey off Froome's shoulders in stage 6, where he escaped with Peter Sagan and Joaquim Rodríguez on a short climb with a gradient of 30%. He held off Froome in the final time trial. In April, he won the Giro del Trentino on the final stage featuring a mountaintop finish. He took the lead from Maxime Bouet, who had been the overall leader since the second stage. Nibali powered away on the last Hors Category climb, distancing rivals Mauro Santambrogio and Wiggins, who suffered a mechanical issue, and winning the stage in solo fashion.

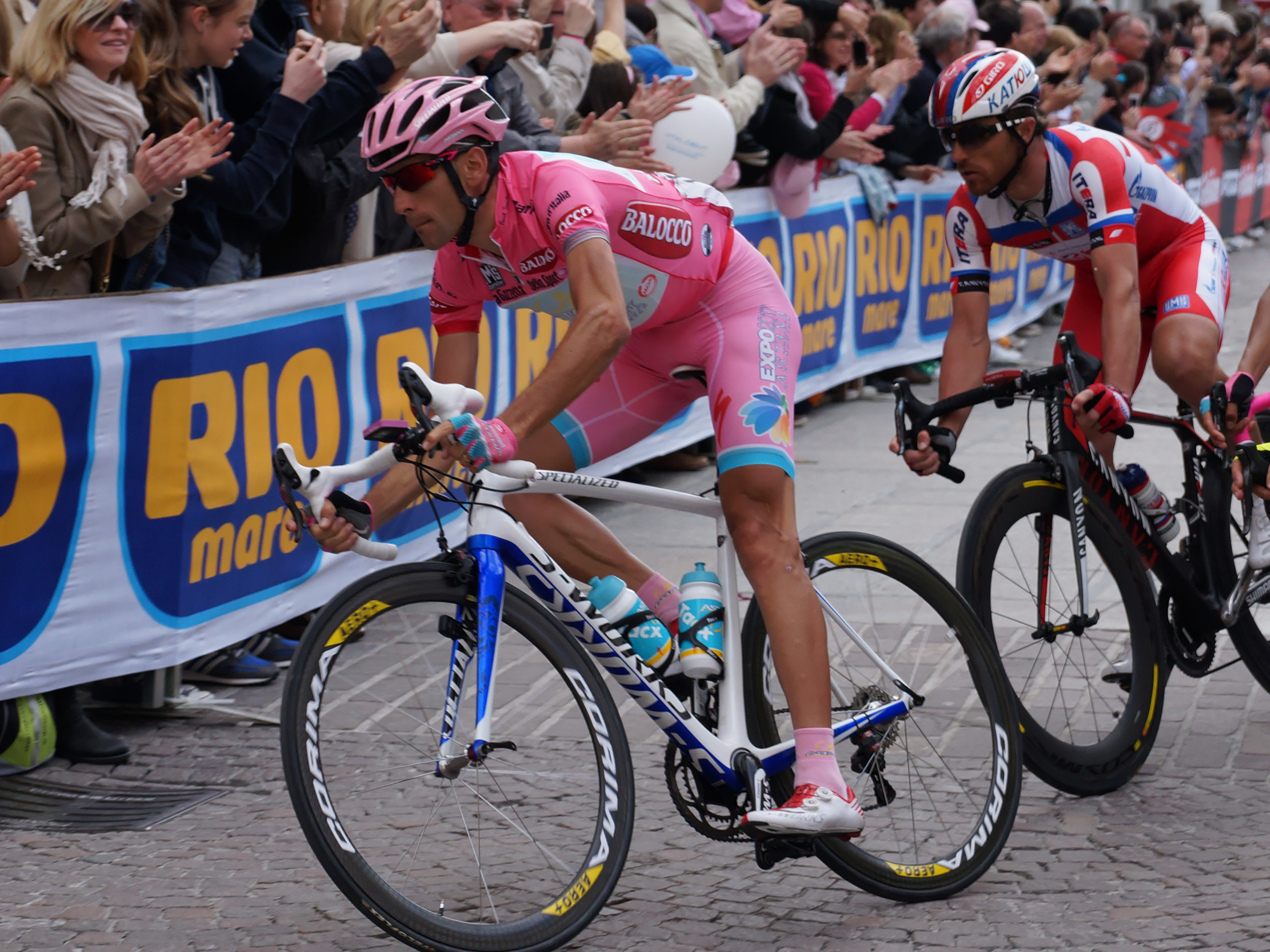
Nibali wearing the leader's pink jersey on the final stage of the 2013 Giro d'Italia

Nibali and Wiggins entered the Giro d'Italia as the two favourites for overall victory. Nibali took the leader's pink jersey (Italian: maglia rosa) on stage eight after finishing fourth in the time trial won by Alex Dowsett, conceding only 11 seconds to Wiggins. On stage ten, the first mountain top finish, Nibali finished third behind Rigoberto Urán to extend his lead over second placed Evans to 41 seconds. The rest of the race was severely affected by poor weather conditions. Nibali put further time into his rivals on stage 14, finishing on Monte Jafferau, as he and Mauro Santambrogio rode away in freezing conditions, with Nibali allowing Santambrogio to take the stage win; after the disqualification of Santambrogio, due to a positive test for EPO, the stage victory was retroactively awarded to Nibali. Nibali won stage 18, a mountain time trial, by 58 seconds from Samuel Sánchez, to extend his lead over Evans and Urán to over four minutes. The following stage, scheduled to be the queen stage of the race, had to be cancelled due to snow. Stage 20, the final mountain stage, also saw heavy snow, as Nibali attacked on the final climb to Tre Cime di Lavaredo to win the stage by 17 seconds from Fabio Duarte, with Urán a further two seconds back. Nibali also moved into the lead in the points classification. Nibali safely negotiated the final stage to Brescia to win the Giro by four minutes 43 seconds over Urán, his second Grand tour overall victory. However, as Mark Cavendish collected all the intermediate sprints before winning the final stage, Nibali finished second to Cavendish in the points classification.

At the Vuelta Nibali was vexed as to whether he should chase the red jersey to record his second grand tour in 2013 or reserve his energy for the World Championships to be held just weeks later in his adopted Tuscany. He captured the race lead on stage 4 though losing it on stage 8, he managed to regain it on stage 11, a time trial. He rode well throughout wearing the red jersey for several stages maintaining his race lead through much of the race. Nibali has now worn the leader's jersey more than any other Italian in the history of the Vuelta. He lost his race lead though on stage 19 to Chris Horner. He attacked Horner many times during the final mountain stage on the steep Angliru but he cracked in the end finishing 4th on that stage. He finished 2nd overall in the general classification.

==== 2014 ====
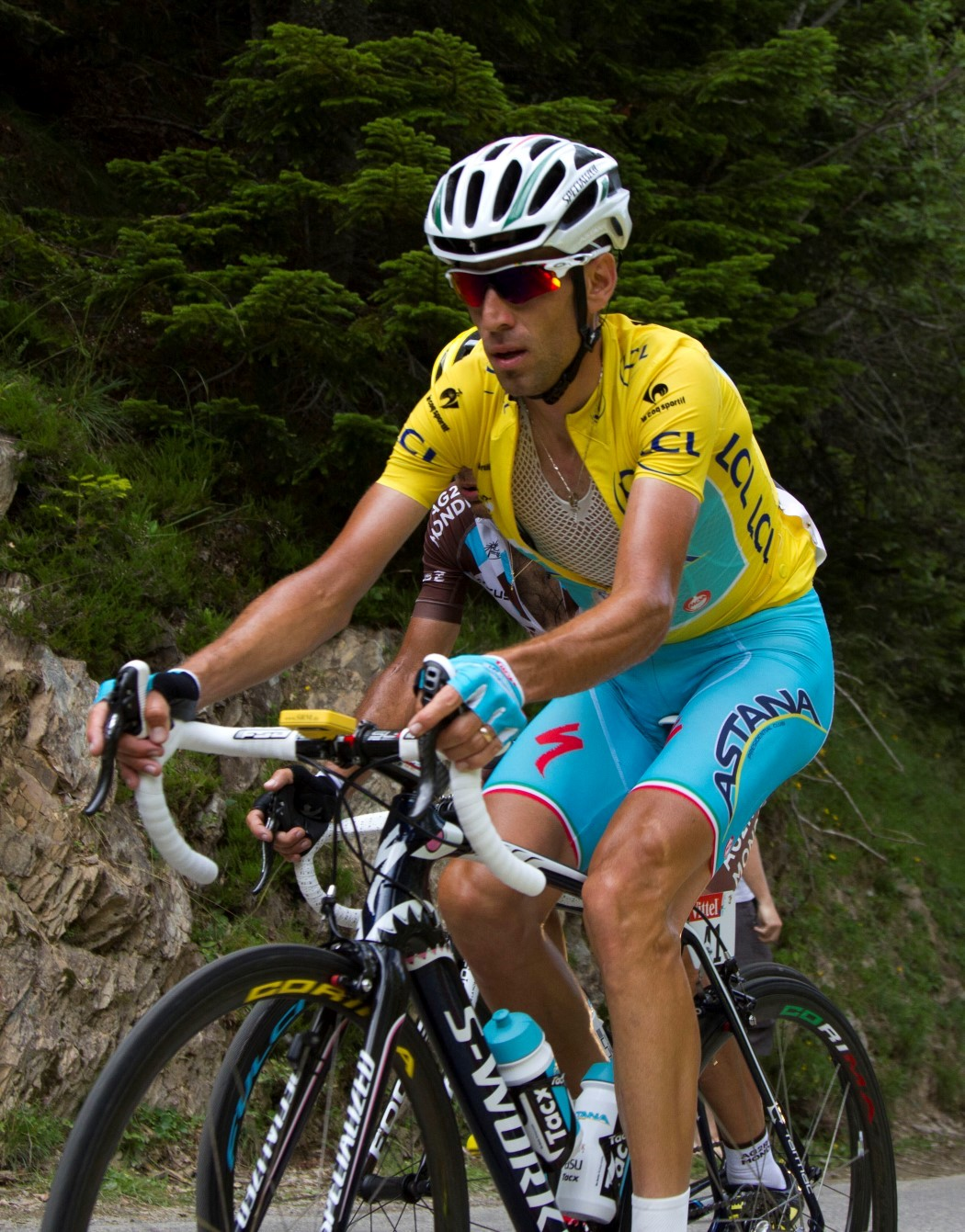
Nibali wearing the yellow jersey at the 2014 Tour de France

After winning the Giro in 2013, the Tour de France became the main objective for Nibali's 2014 season. Throughout much of his season before the Tour, Nibali showed quiet form before the Tour with no race victories and high finishes. He was also criticized by the Italian press after a disappointing Critérium du Dauphiné. On 28 June Nibali became the 2014 Italian Champion with his first win of the year at the national road race championships, based on the route of the Trofeo Melinda.

Nibali then went on to win the Tour de France. He first secured the leader's yellow jersey on 6 July by winning the 201 km (125 mi) second stage of the Tour, between York and Sheffield, after breaking away right before the finish. On stage 5, a stage featuring nine sectors of pavé, he gained over 2 minutes over a majority of the GC contenders. He continued to lead the race from stage two through eight, losing it to Frenchman Tony Gallopin in the ninth stage. But he regained it in the tenth stage from Mulhouse to La Planche des Belles Filles after one of his biggest general classification competitors Alberto Contador crashed and abandoned the race, and after catching Joaquim Rodríguez and Michał Kwiatkowski up the final climb to Planche des Belles Filles. He won the stage uncontested and re-donned the yellow jersey on Bastille Day in France. Nibali then won stage 13 into Chamrousse after passing Leopold König and Rafał Majka near the top. He would continue to show his dominance through the rest of the Tour and on stage 18 into Hautacam he attacked from the early slopes of the climb and he would win the stage finishing over a minute ahead of second place rider Thibaut Pinot. This gave him his fourth and final stage victory. He finished with an excellent 4th-place finish in the final time trial. He went on to win the general classification by 7 minutes and 52 seconds, the largest margin of victory in the Tour in 17 years. Nibali's Tour de France-themed Specialized S-Works Tarmac is now on display at the Marin Museum of Bicycling in Fairfax, California. The next race for Nibali was on 16 September at the Coppa Bernocchi. He finished in the lead group (18th) after attacking several times during the event.

==== 2015 ====
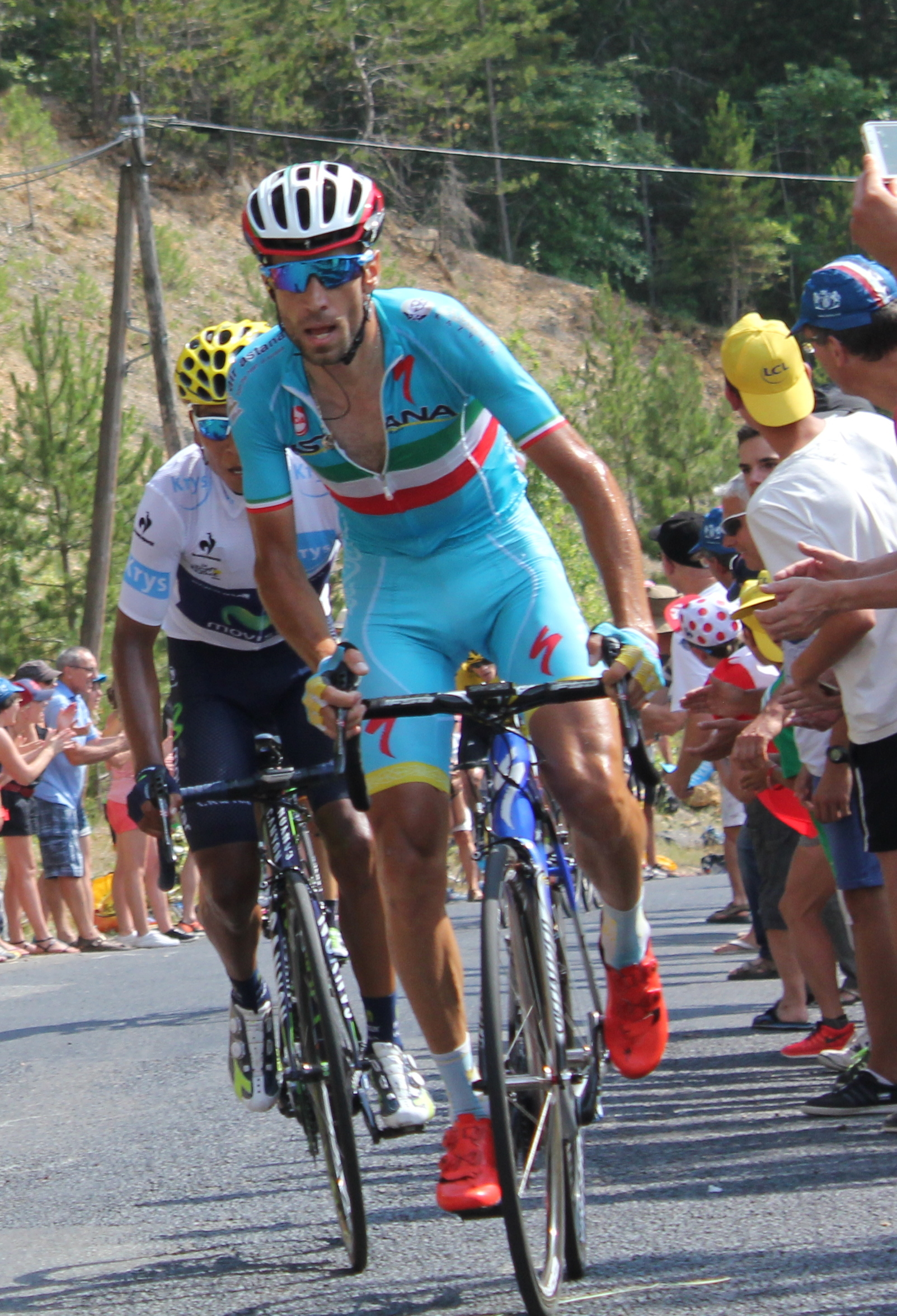
Nibali finished fourth in the 2015 Tour de France as defending champion (pictured attacking with Nairo Quintana during the 14th stage).

In 2015, Nibali made the defense of his 2014 Tour de France title his priority. His first notable result was 16th in the overall classification of Tirreno–Adriatico. He then participated to the Amstel Gold Race and escaped thanks to a late attack, but was reabsorbed by the peloton and finished 65th. In the La Flèche Wallonne, he tried an attack on the penultimate climb, but it failed and he finished 20th, only 19 seconds off the pace. His first significant result of the year was placing tenth in the Tour de Romandie.

In June, he took part to the Critérium du Dauphiné, in which got a second place in the 6th stage and wore the yellow-blue jersey, which was lost the following day; after that, Nibali became the Italian National Champion for the second year in a row. He attacked during the last ascent and got the better of Francesco Reda and Diego Ulissi.

He entered the Tour de France, but lost two and a half minutes to Chris Froome in the first week. He lost a further 4:25 on the first mountain stage to La Pierre-Saint-Martin after he was dropped early in the stage; and was ninth overall after the three Pyrenean stages, trailing Froome by almost eight minutes. As his hopes of a title defense had faded, he attacked in the Alpine stages and won the 19th stage from Saint-Jean-de-Maurienne to La Toussuire-Les Sybelles, after a 62-kilometre solo. At the end of the stage Nibali was accused by Froome of unsportsmanlike behavior for attacking whilst Froome's bicycle had a brief mechanical problem 58 km from the finish. It is not known whether Nibali was aware of the problem, since there was no communication from Radio Tour about the incident (as later stated by Astana manager Alexandre Vinokourov). Television replays showed "Nibali twice glancing over his shoulder before accelerating away." He finished the Tour de France in 4th place overall in the general classification, 8 minutes and 36 seconds down on the winner, Chris Froome. This would be the 10th consecutive grand tour Nibali entered where he finished in the top 10, an achievement unmatched since Miguel Induráin did so in eleven in a row two decades earlier.

Nibali also started the Vuelta a España, where he shared leadership of Astana with Fabio Aru, the eventual winner of the Vuelta. On the second stage, however, Nibali was caught up in a large crash and was forced to chase hard to return to the peloton. During the chase he held on to the team car, driven by the team's directeur sportif, Alexander Shefer, and was pulled up towards the main group. Both Nibali and Shefer were disqualified from the race following the stage, with the team also fined. The race director stated that he lamented the rider's "regrettable attitude". Nibali later issued a statement via Facebook where he apologised for his actions.

In autumn, he won the Trittico Lombardo, taking solo victories in the Coppa Bernocchi and Tre Valli Varesine and placing second in the Coppa Ugo Agostoni. In October he won his first Monument, Il Lombardia, attacking on the descent of the Civiglio, the penultimate climb, and arriving solo ahead of Daniel Moreno and Thibaut Pinot.

==== 2016 ====
In February, Nibali won the queen stage, finishing on the Green Mountain, and the overall classification at the Tour of Oman.

Preparing for the Giro d'Italia, one of the two main targets of the season, he raced the Italian one-day race Strade Bianche, the stage race Tirreno–Adriatico, where he finished in 6th position overall – conditioned by the cancellation of the queen stage – and Milan–San Remo where he tried an attack on the descent from the Poggio but was caught by the peloton.

He returned to racing in April at the Giro del Trentino, where he demonstrated a bad condition and finished far from the winner Mikel Landa. The last race before the Giro was Liège–Bastogne–Liège, the most important of the Ardennes classics, concluded more than two minutes behind the winner after being distanced on the Côte de Saint Nicolas.

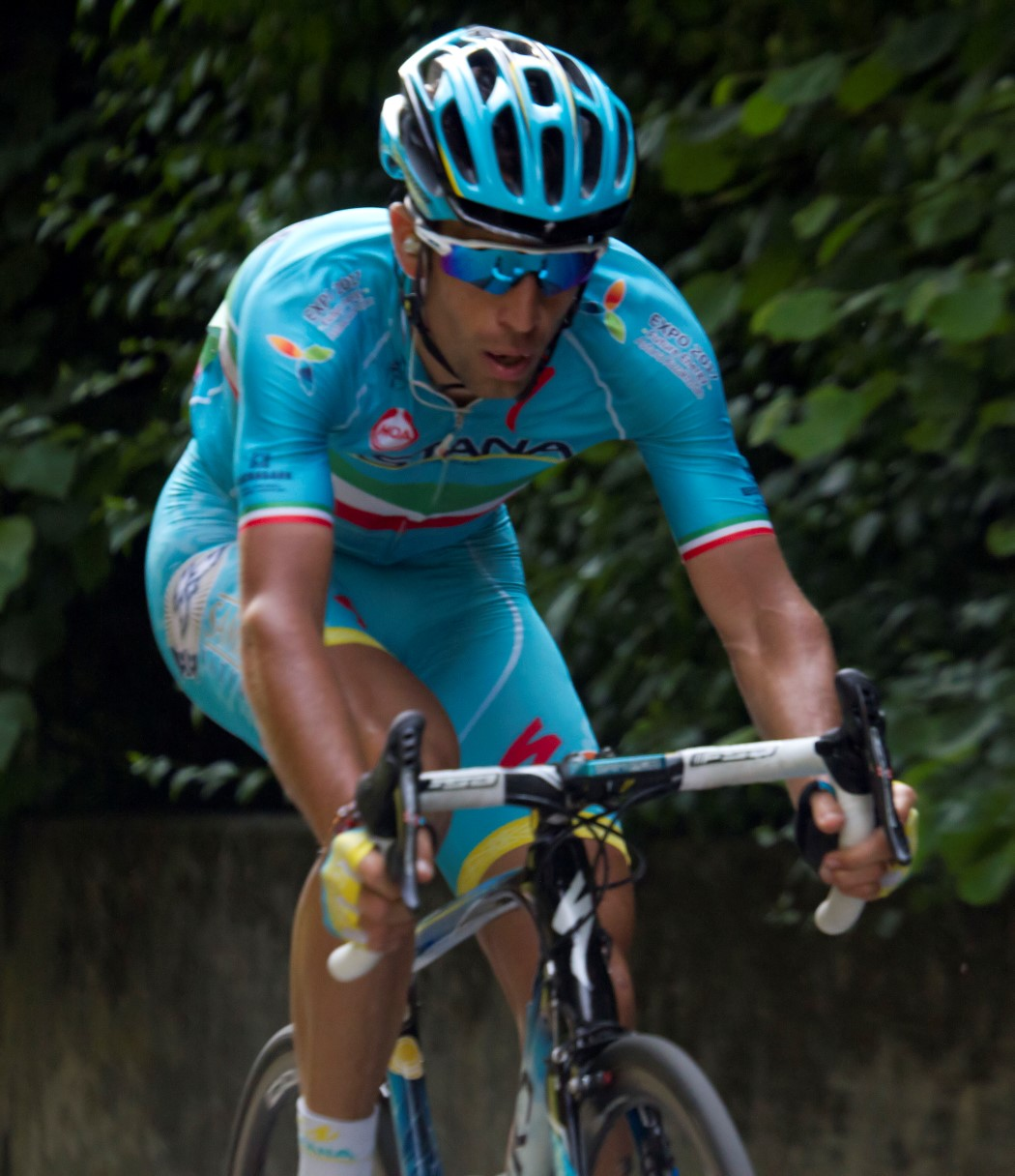
Nibali won his second Giro d'Italia in 2016 ahead of Esteban Chaves and Alejandro Valverde (pictured during the 18th stage of the Giro to Pinerolo).

Nibali entered the Giro d'Italia as the pre-race favourite. On Stage 14, the queen stage of the race, featuring six categorised climbs before the descent to Corvara. Nibali lit up the fight for the GC on the final climb to Valparola, attacking with 27 kilometres (17 miles) to go. His attack distanced the Movistar Team's Andrey Amador and Alejandro Valverde, who both lost three minutes on the stage. However, Steven Kruijswijk (LottoNL–Jumbo) attacked close to the summit, with Esteban Chaves (Orica–GreenEDGE), and the pair dropped Nibali, who lost more than half a minute after the stage. Chaves took the stage honours after outsprinting Kruijswijk, who took the maglia rosa. Stage 15 was the third individual time trial of the race, featuring the ascent to Alpe di Siusi. Kruijswijk extended his lead to more than two minutes over second-placed Chaves as Nibali suffered a mechanical on the climb, losing more than two minutes in the process.

Stage 16 was a short stage which was won by Valverde, who outsprinted Kruijswijk on the line. Kruijswijk extended his lead in the general classification to three minutes as Chaves lost 42 seconds while Nibali cracked on the last climb. He lost almost two minutes to drop to fourth overall, almost five minutes down. Stage 19 was the first to head into the high mountains, featuring the Cima Coppi, the Colle Dell'Agnello, and a subsequent descent and climb to a summit finish at Risoul in France. On the descent of the Colle Dell'Agnello, Kruijswijk crashed whilst trying to follow Nibali. The day proved to be a redemption for Nibali as he won the stage after dropping Chaves on the climb to Risoul. In tears after the finish, the Shark dedicated the win to Rosario Costa, a young cyclist from Nibali's junior cycling team, who had been killed two weeks before. Meanwhile, Kruijswijk crossed the line almost five minutes down on Nibali and more than four minutes behind Chaves. Chaves took the maglia rosa with a 44-second advantage over Nibali as Kruijswijk, who would later be diagnosed with a fractured rib, fell to third overall at a minute and five seconds behind. Stage 20 was the final decisive stage in terms of the general classification, with three first category climbs and the steep third category climb to the finish at Sant'Anna di Vinadio. Nibali attacked on the penultimate climb, distancing Chaves and the other GC contenders, and made up the deficit to Chaves to claim his second Giro d'Italia ahead of the final stage in Turin.

Nibali's other main target of the season was the Olympic Road race. Nibali bridged across to the leading 6 man group on the penultimate descent of the Vista Chinesa circuit with teammate Fabio Aru, and on the final climb of the race he broke clear with Rafał Majka and Sergio Henao. However, Nibali and Henao crashed out of the race on the final descent during the Olympic Road race, with Nibali suffering a broken collarbone.

=== Bahrain–Merida (2017–19) ===
==== 2017 ====
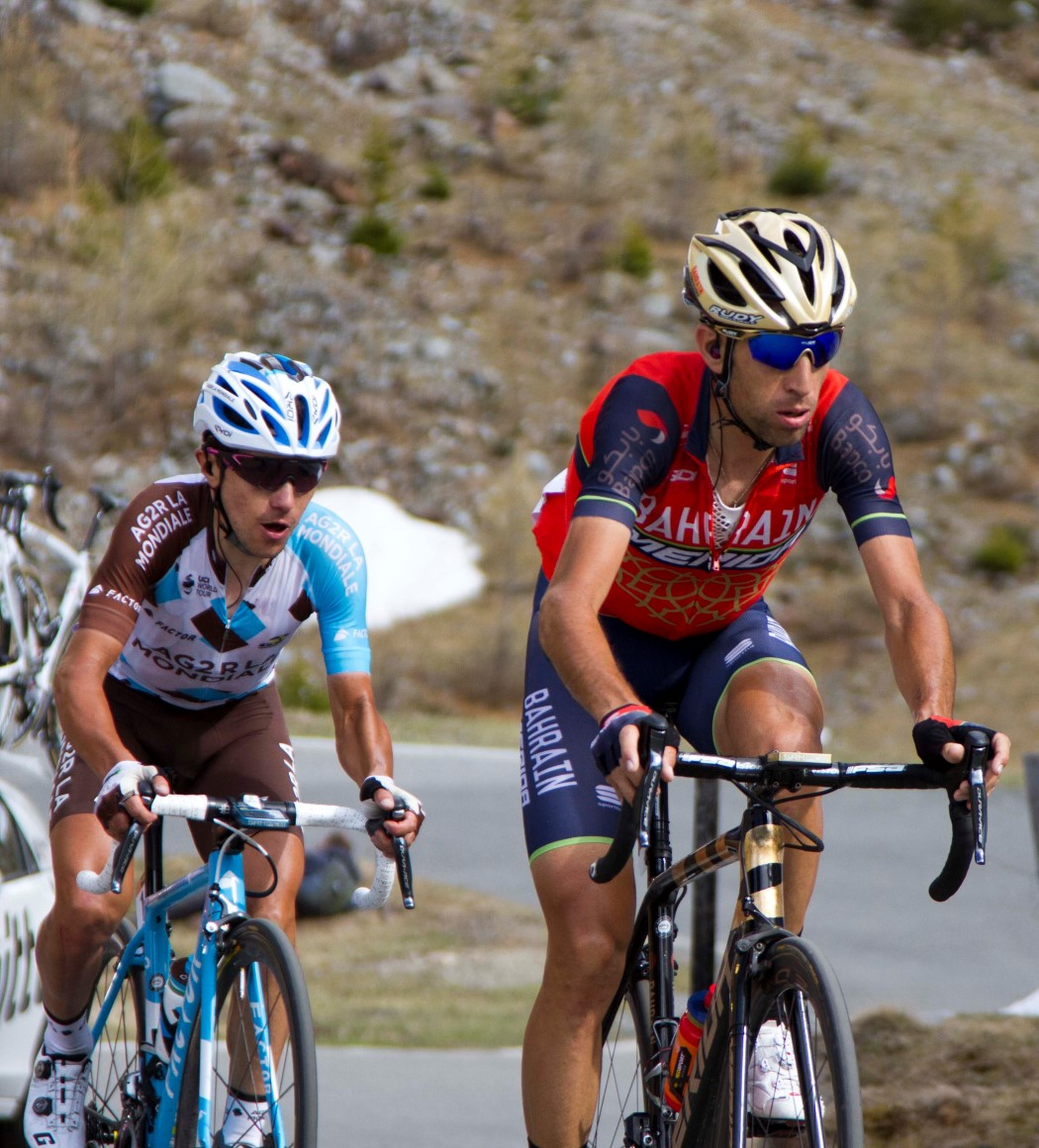
Nibali (right) at the 2017 Giro d'Italia

After four seasons with Astana, Nibali announced in August 2016 that he would join the newly formed Bahrain–Merida team in 2017. After two podiums at Giro d'Italia and Vuelta a España, in October he won his second Il Lombardia, by attacking again Thibaut Pinot on the descent of the Civiglio and arriving solo in Como. He finished his season by taking victory in the Taiwan KOM Challenge, setting a new course record in the process.

==== 2018 ====
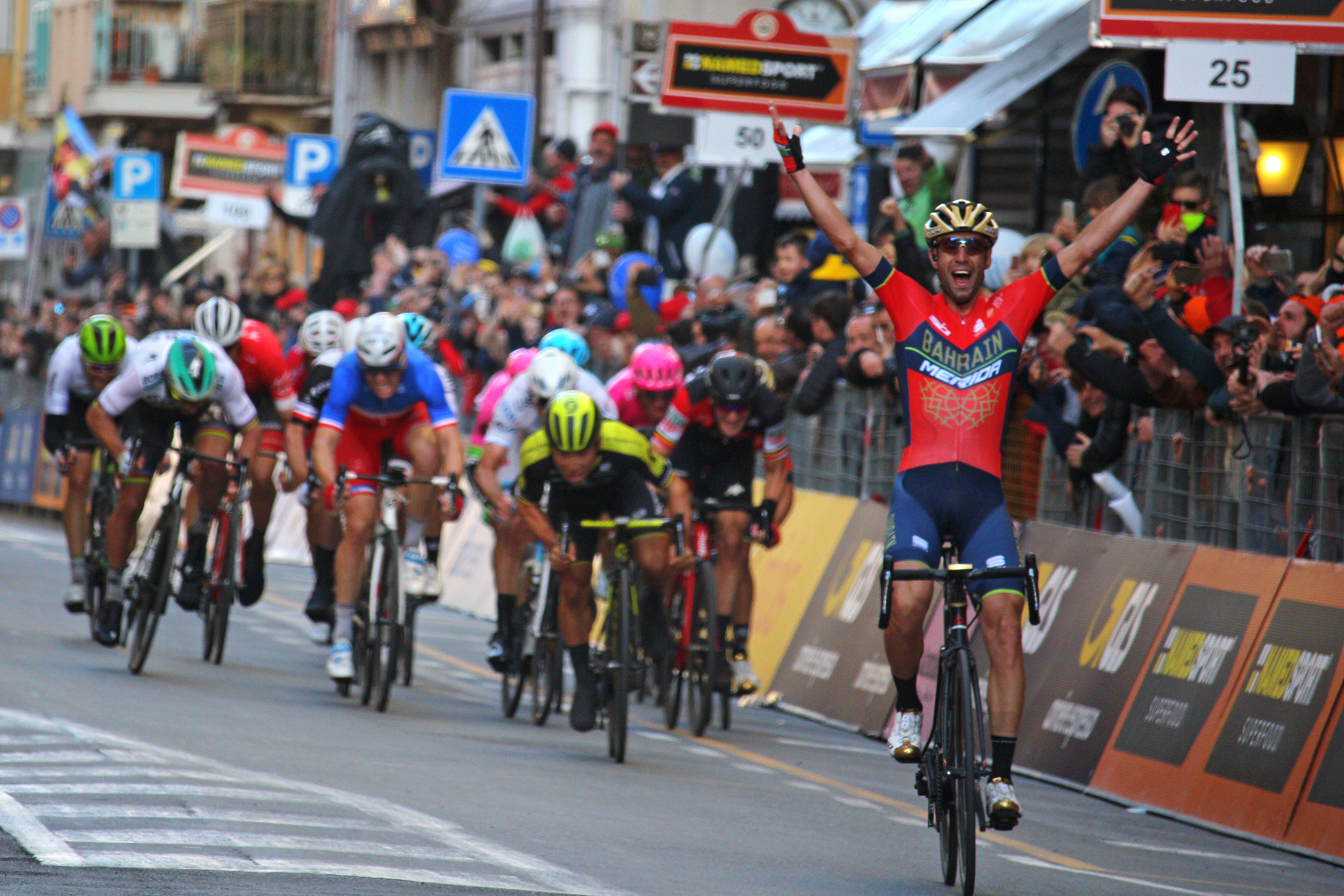
Nibali celebrating victory in the 2018 Milan–San Remo

In March 2018, Nibali won Milan-San Remo, his third cycling monument, becoming the first Italian winner of La Classicissima since Filippo Pozzato in 2006. Nibali had attacked on the Poggio di San Remo, and managed to hold off the sprinters in the closing kilometers to seal victory. Two weeks later, he finished 24th in his maiden Tour of Flanders, which included an attack on the Kruisberg that sparked the winning move of Niki Terpstra. Nibali withdrew from the 2018 Tour de France after stage 12, having suffered a crash on the ascent of the Alpe d'Huez after spectator interference. Although injured with a fractured vertebra, he managed to finish the stage in seventh place, 13 seconds behind stage winner and yellow jersey holder Geraint Thomas.

==== 2019 ====
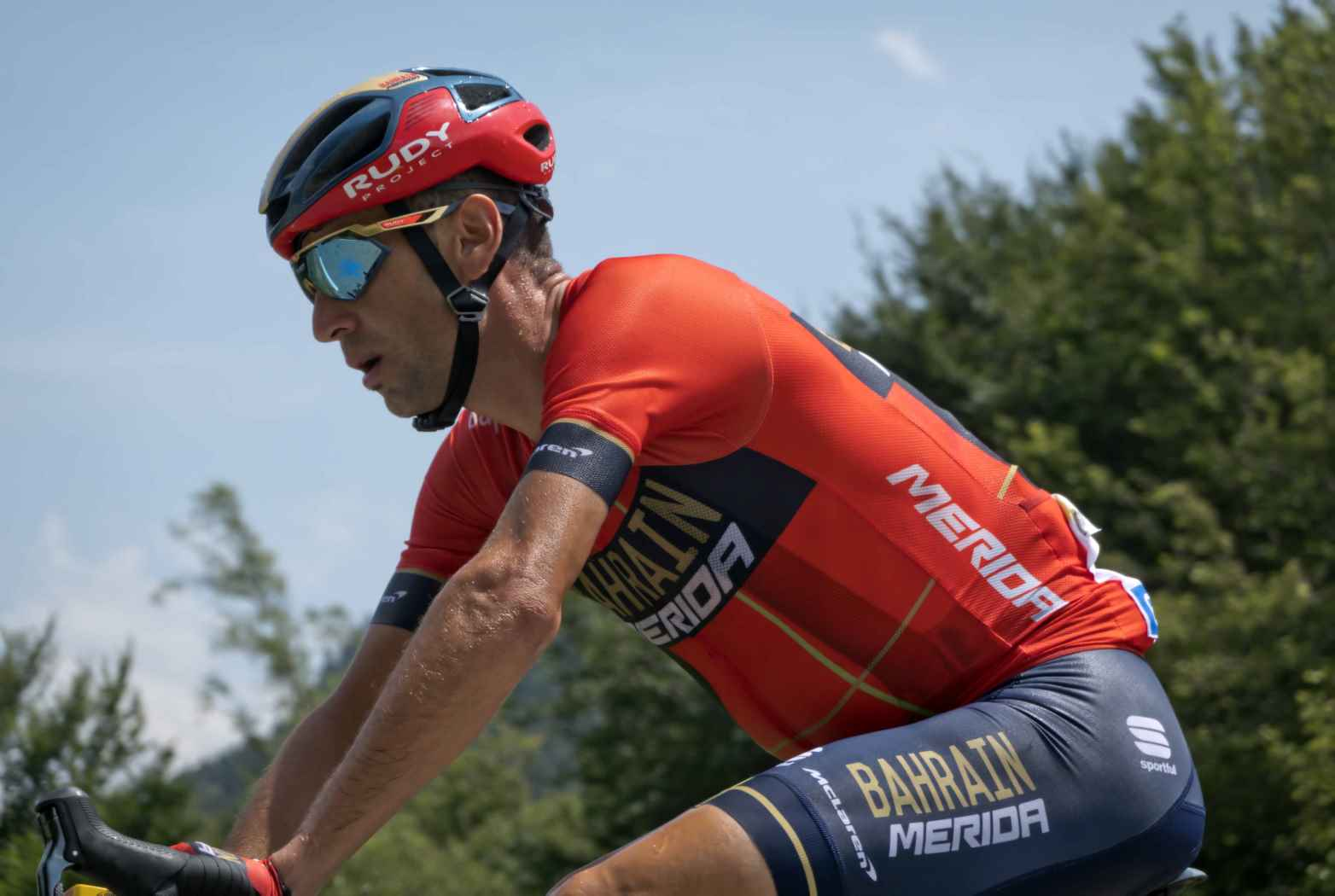
Nibali at the 2019 Tour de France

Nibali entered the Giro d'Italia and finished the race in second place overall, behind Richard Carapaz. Nibali won the shortened Stage 20 of the Tour de France. With 12 km (7.5 mi) remaining, Nibali attacked and soloed to victory, ten seconds ahead of chasers Mikel Landa and Alejandro Valverde.

=== Trek–Segafredo (2020–21) ===
On 4 June 2019, Cycling Weekly reported that Nibali had signed for Trek–Segafredo for the 2020 season. Over his two seasons with the team, he achieved two victories – a final-day stage win that also saw him win the general classification at the 2021 Giro di Sicilia, his home race.

=== Astana Qazaqstan Team (2022) ===
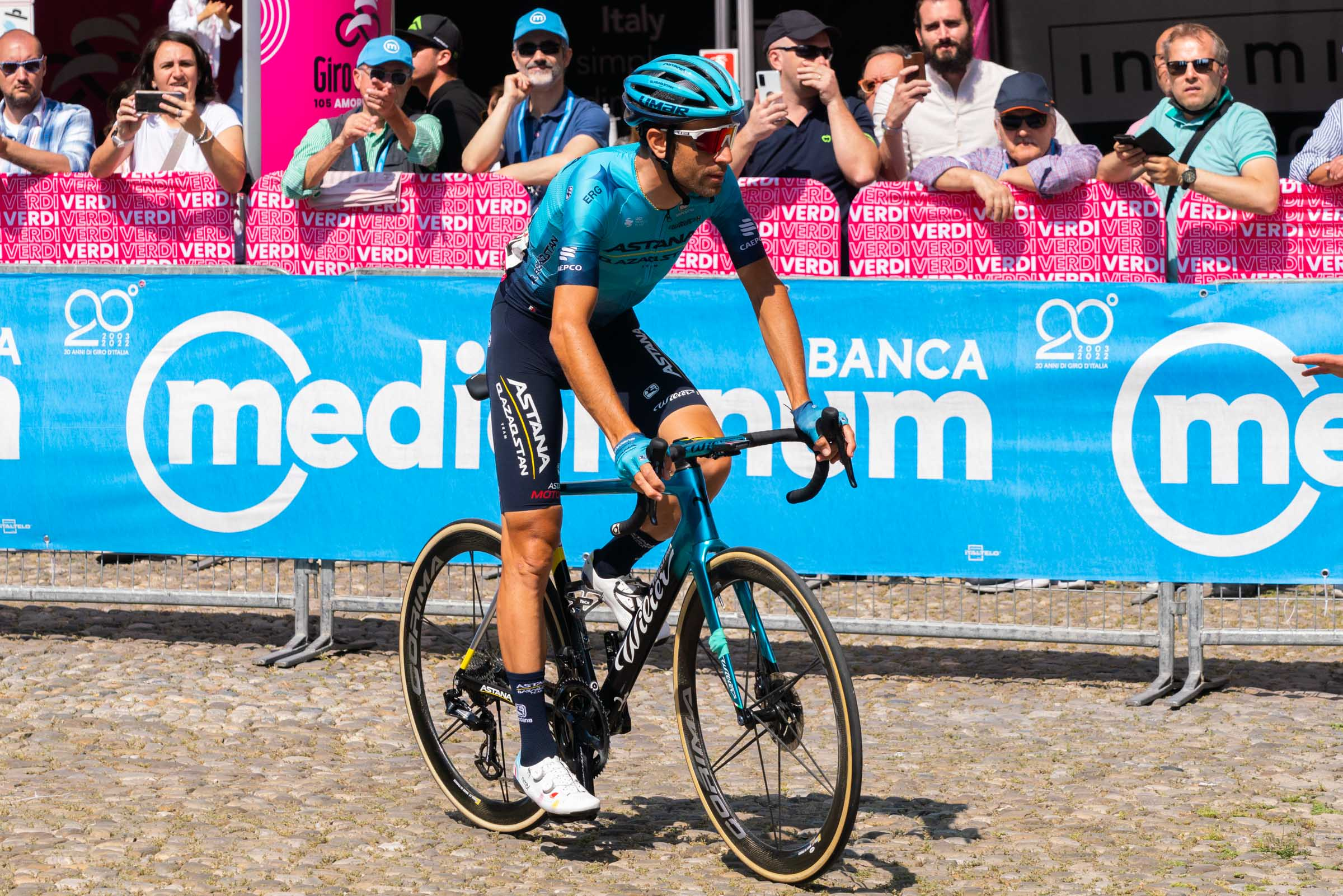
Nibali at the 2022 Giro d'Italia

In September 2021, Nibali announced that he was rejoining the Astana Qazaqstan Team for the 2022 season. After completing the fifth stage of May's Giro d'Italia, which finished in his native Messina, Nibali announced his impending retirement at the end of the season. He cited his desire to spend more time with friends and family. He ultimately finished the race in fourth place overall, his joint-best result of the season, along with the Giro di Sicilia.

In November 2022, it was announced that Nibali would act as a technical advisor for UCI ProTeam Q36.5 Pro Cycling Team, a team that is due to start competing from 2023.

== Personal life ==
Nibali moved to Lugano in the spring of 2012 with his girlfriend Rachele Perinelli. The couple got married in October 2012 and have a daughter, born in February 2014.

Nibali has a younger brother, Antonio Nibali, who is also a racing cyclist, having turned professional in 2014 to ride for the Marchiol–Emisfero team in Italy. Antonio joined his older brother at Bahrain–Merida from 2017 to 2019, Trek–Segafredo in 2020 and 2021, and Astana Qazaqstan Team in 2022.

== Career achievements ==
=== Major results ===
2002
1st Road race, National Junior Road Championships
1st Overall Giro della Lunigiana

1st Points classification
1st Stages 1a & 1b (ITT)

3rd Time trial, UCI Junior Road World Championships
2004
UCI Under-23 Road World Championships

3rd Time trial
5th Road race

3rd Overall Giro della Toscana

1st Mountains classification
1st Young rider classification
1st Stage 4

5th Overall Giro delle Regioni
6th Time trial, National Under-23 Road Championships
7th Gran Premio Industria del Cuoio e delle Pelli
8th Time trial, UEC European Under-23 Road Championships
2005
1st Stage 1b (TTT) Settimana Internazionale di Coppi e Bartali
4th Time trial, National Road Championships
6th Milano–Torino
8th Firenze–Pistoia
2006 (2 pro wins)
1st GP Ouest–France
2nd Overall Settimana Internazionale di Coppi e Bartali

1st Young rider classification
1st Stage 1

2nd Trofeo Città di Borgomanero (with Roman Kreuziger)
3rd Overall Eneco Tour
4th Gran Premio di Chiasso
5th Time trial, National Road Championships
8th Overall Danmark Rundt
8th Overall Tour de Pologne
8th Trofeo Melinda
2007 (4)
1st GP Industria & Artigianato di Larciano
1st Giro di Toscana
1st Trofeo Città di Borgomanero (with Roman Kreuziger)
Giro d'Italia

1st Stage 1 (TTT)
Held after Stages 4 & 5

2nd Time trial, National Road Championships
2nd Overall Tour of Slovenia

1st Points classification
1st Stages 3 & 4

4th Firenze–Pistoia
5th Trofeo Sóller
6th Overall Circuit de la Sarthe
6th Memorial Marco Pantani
6th Giro d'Oro
8th Overall Giro del Trentino

1st Young rider classification

8th Gran Premio Industria e Commercio di Prato
2008 (2)
1st Overall Giro del Trentino

1st Stage 3

3rd Overall Settimana Internazionale di Coppi e Bartali
8th Overall Volta a la Comunitat Valenciana
8th Gran Premio Industria e Commercio di Prato
10th Liège–Bastogne–Liège
Tour de France

Held after Stages 12–15

2009 (2)
1st Giro dell'Appennino
1st Gran Premio Città di Camaiore
5th GP Miguel Induráin
5th Klasika Primavera
5th GP Industria & Artigianato di Larciano
6th Overall Tour de France
6th Overall Tour of California
7th Overall Critérium du Dauphiné Libéré
9th Overall Tour of the Basque Country
10th Overall Tirreno–Adriatico
2010 (7)
1st Overall Vuelta a España

1st Combination classification
1st Stage 20

1st Overall Tour de San Luis

1st Stage 4 (ITT)

1st Overall Tour of Slovenia

1st Stage 3

1st Trofeo Melinda
3rd Overall Giro d'Italia

1st Stages 4 (TTT) & 14
1st Azzurri d'Italia classification
Held after Stages 4–6

3rd Overall Vuelta a Burgos
5th UCI World Ranking
5th Giro di Lombardia
5th Giro dell'Emilia
8th Overall Tirreno–Adriatico
2011 (1)
2nd Overall Giro d'Italia

1st Stage 16 (ITT)
Held after Stages 13 & 14

5th Overall Tirreno–Adriatico
6th Overall Vuelta a Espana
7th UCI World Tour
8th Milan–San Remo
8th Liège–Bastogne–Liège
9th Gran Piemonte
9th Classica Sarda
10th Giro dell'Emilia
2012 (5)
1st Overall Tirreno–Adriatico

1st Points classification
1st Stage 5

1st Overall Giro di Padania

1st Points classification
1st Mountains classification
1st Stage 4

2nd Overall Tour of Oman

1st Stage 5

2nd Liège–Bastogne–Liège
3rd Overall Tour de France
3rd Milan–San Remo
4th UCI World Tour
4th Overall Tour de San Luis
5th Road race, National Road Championships
8th La Flèche Wallonne
9th Milano–Torino
2013 (6)
1st Overall Giro d'Italia

1st Stages 14, 18 (ITT) & 20
Held after Stage 20

1st Overall Tirreno–Adriatico
1st Overall Giro del Trentino

1st Mountains classification
1st Stage 4

2nd Overall Vuelta a España

1st Stage 1 (TTT)
Held after Stages 2, 4–7 & 11–18

3rd Overall Vuelta a Burgos
4th Road race, UCI Road World Championships
5th UCI World Tour
7th Overall Tour of Oman
7th Gran Premio della Costa Etruschi
10th Overall Tour de San Luis
2014 (6)
1st Road race, National Road Championships (Trofeo Melinda)
1st Overall Tour de France

1st Stages 2, 10, 13 & 18
Held after Stage 13

5th UCI World Tour
5th Overall Tour de Romandie
7th Overall Critérium du Dauphiné
10th Tour of Almaty
2015 (5)
1st Road race, National Road Championships
1st Giro di Lombardia
1st Coppa Bernocchi
1st Tre Valli Varesine
2nd Coppa Ugo Agostoni
3rd Memorial Marco Pantani
4th Overall Tour de France

1st Stage 19
Combativity award Stage 4

5th Gran Premio Industria e Commercio di Prato
9th Overall Abu Dhabi Tour
10th Overall Tour de Romandie
2016 (4)
1st Overall Giro d'Italia

1st Stage 19

1st Overall Tour of Oman

1st Stage 4

1st Stage 1 (TTT) Giro del Trentino
4th Overall Abu Dhabi Tour
6th Overall Tirreno–Adriatico
Combativity award Stage 7 Tour de France
2017 (4)
1st Overall Tour of Croatia
1st Giro di Lombardia
1st Taiwan KOM Challenge
2nd Overall Vuelta a España

1st Stage 3
Held after Stage 3

2nd Giro dell'Emilia
3rd Overall Giro d'Italia

1st Stage 16

3rd Tre Valli Varesine
4th Overall Giro della Toscana
5th UCI World Tour
8th Overall Vuelta a San Juan
9th Overall Tour de Pologne
2018 (1)
1st Milan–San Remo
2nd Giro di Lombardia
8th Giro dell'Emilia
8th Chrono des Nations
2019 (1)
Tour de France

1st Stage 20
Combativity award Stage 20

2nd Overall Giro d'Italia
3rd Overall Tour of the Alps
5th Gran Premio di Lugano
8th Milan–San Remo
8th Liège–Bastogne–Liège
2020
3rd La Drôme Classic
4th Overall Paris–Nice
5th Gran Trittico Lombardo
6th Giro di Lombardia
7th Overall Giro d'Italia
7th Giro dell'Emilia
2021 (2)
1st Overall Giro di Sicilia

1st Stage 4

9th Overall Tirreno–Adriatico
9th Overall Tour de Luxembourg
10th GP Industria & Artigianato di Larciano
2022
4th Overall Giro d'Italia
4th Overall Giro di Sicilia
8th Coppa Ugo Agostoni

==== General classification results timeline ====
Grand Tour general classification results
Grand Tour	2005	2006	2007	2008	2009	2010	2011	2012	2013	2014	2015	2016	2017	2018	2019	2020	2021	2022
Giro d'Italia	—	—	19	11	—	3	2	—	1	—	—	1	3	—	2	7	18	4
Tour de France	—	—	—	20	6	—	—	3	—	1	4	30	—	DNF	39	—	DNF	—
/ Vuelta a España	—	—	—	—	—	1	7	—	2	—	DSQ	—	2	59	—	—	—	45
Major stage race general classification results
Major stage race	2005	2006	2007	2008	2009	2010	2011	2012	2013	2014	2015	2016	2017	2018	2019	2020	2021	2022
Paris–Nice	—	66	—	—	—	—	—	—	—	21	—	—	—	—	—	4	—	—
/ Tirreno–Adriatico	—	—	17	—	10	8	5	1	1	—	16	6	26	11	15	19	9	—
Volta a Catalunya	56	—	—	—	—	—	—	—	—	—	—	—	—	—	—	NH	—	—
Tour of the Basque Country	92	—	—	—	9	—	—	—	—	—	—	—	—	DNF	—	NH	—	—
Tour de Romandie	—	—	—	—	—	—	—	—	—	5	10	—	—	—	—	NH	—	—
Critérium du Dauphiné	—	DNF	—	—	7	—	—	28	—	7	12	—	—	24	—	—	—	—
Tour de Suisse	DNF	—	—	—	—	—	—	—	—	—	—	—	—	—	—	NH	—	—

==== Monuments results timeline ====
Monument	2005	2006	2007	2008	2009	2010	2011	2012	2013	2014	2015	2016	2017	2018	2019	2020	2021	2022
Milan–San Remo	—	69	—	—	49	28	8	3	DNF	44	45	33	—	1	8	23	35	—
Tour of Flanders	—	—	—	—	—	—	—	—	—	—	—	—	—	24	—	—	—	—
Paris–Roubaix	Did not contest during his career																	
Liège–Bastogne–Liège	112	DNF	71	10	39	27	8	2	23	30	13	51	—	32	8	—	—	30
Giro di Lombardia	79	DNF	34	37	—	5	40	26	DNF	—	1	—	1	2	55	6	13	24

==== Major championship results timeline ====
	2005	2006	2007	2008	2009	2010	2011	2012	2013	2014	2015	2016	2017	2018	2019	2020	2021	2022
Olympic Games	Not held			DNF	Not held			101	Not held			DNF	Not held				53	NH
World Championships	—	—	—	—	—	40	—	29	4	40	42	—	—	49	—	15	—	—
National Championships	57	—	DNF	DNF	18	DNF	DNF	5	—	1	1	—	12	70	DNF	11	9	21

Legend
—	Did not compete
DNF	Did not finish
DSQ	Disqualified
NH	Not held

=== Awards ===
Nibali is a six-time winner of the Giglio d'Oro, an award given to the best Italian professional cyclist of the year. He won the award in 2010, consecutively between 2012 and 2015, and 2017.
