= 2007 Monte Paschi Eroica =

2007 UCI Europe Tour

Race details
- Dates: October 9
- Distance: 181 km (112.5 mi)
- Winning time: 4h 42' 10"

Results
	Winner	Alexandr Kolobnev (RUS)	(Team CSC)
	Second	Marcus Ljungqvist (SWE)	(Team CSC)
	Third	Mikhaylo Khalilov (UKR)	(Ceramica Flaminia–Bossini Docce)

The 2007 Monte Paschi Eroica was the first professional edition of the Monte Paschi Eroica bike race, later called Strade Bianche. It was raced on Tuesday 9 October 2007 in the province of Siena in Tuscany, Italy. The race was won by Russian rider Alexandr Kolobnev, who completed a 40-kilometre (25-mile) solo, narrowly staying ahead of his teammate Marcus Ljungqvist at the finish. It held a 1.1 UCI rating on the 2007 continental calendar.

The professional race was spun off the granfondo L'Eroica, a recreational bike race for vintage bikes, on the white gravel roads around Siena, an event that continues to this day. The inaugural edition was the only time the race was held mid-week and in autumn; before moving to early March in 2008. Monte dei Paschi, the world's oldest still existing bank and headquartered in Siena, served as the race's title sponsor.

As a newly created race, organizer RCS - Gazzetta dello Sport asked local Tuscan cycling icons Fiorenzo Magni and Paolo Bettini to promote the event.

== Route ==
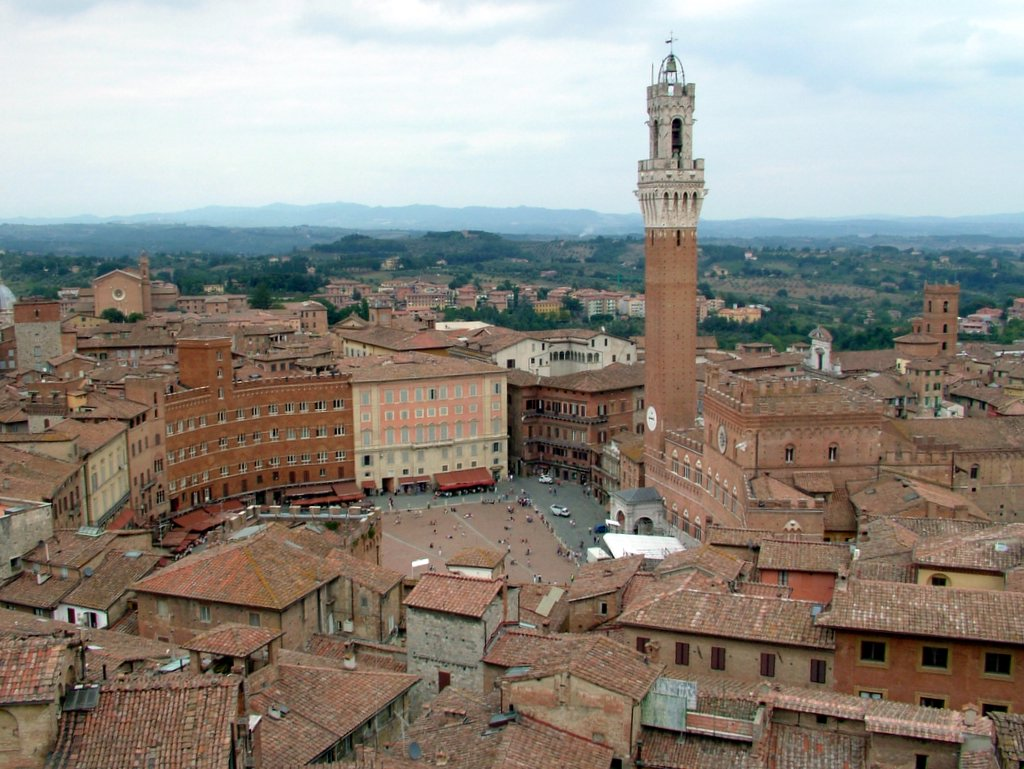
The Piazza del Campo in Siena served as the finish location

The race started in Gaiole in Chianti and ended in Siena, and was run entirely within the boundaries of the province of Siena, in southern Tuscany. The course ran over the undulating hills of the Chianti region and included seven sectors of gravel roads (strade bianche or sterrati), totaling 60 kilometres of dirt roads on a 181 km distance. The race finished on Siena's illustrious Piazza del Campo; the finish came after a particularly steep and narrow ascent over a roughly-paved road into the heart of the medieval city.

== Report ==
Eight riders forced the decisive break on the sterrato climb to Montalcino at 107 km from the finish, facing the remaining four sectors of dirt road. Alexandr Kolobnev and Marcus Ljungqvist (Team CSC), Eros Capecchi (Liquigas), José Alberto Benítez and Manuele Mori (Saunier Duval-Prodir), José Enrique Gutierrez (Team LPR), Jure Golčer (Tenax-Salmilano) and Ricardo Serrano (Tinkoff Credit Systems) were the men to fight out the race as it wound its way back north to Siena.

Kolobnev used his Worlds' form to attack and drop his companions on the penultimate sector. The Russian kept his bike upright on the technical gravel descents that comprised the final strada bianca. After the final sector, 11 km from Siena, he held a 40-second advantage over the chase.

Saunier put the most into the chase with two men but were discouraged by Ljungqvist sitting on. The Swede used his stored strength on the final stretches into Siena to attack and take second place behind his teammate Kolobnev.

== Results ==
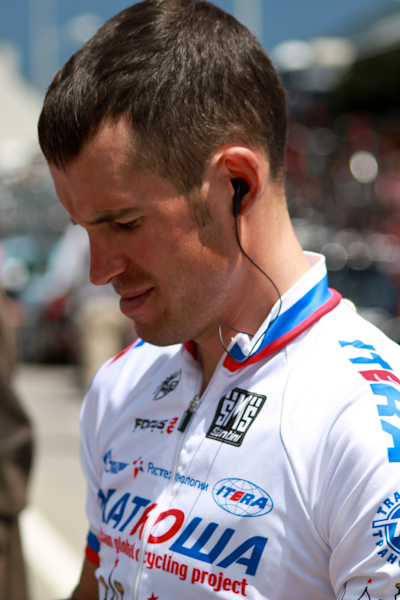
Alexandr Kolobnev (pictured in 2011) won the inaugural edition

Race result
Rank	Rider	Team	Time
1	Alexandr Kolobnev (RUS)	Team CSC	4h 42' 10"
2	Marcus Ljungqvist (SWE)	Team CSC	+ 3"
3	Mikhaylo Khalilov (UKR)	Ceramica Flaminia–Bossini Docce	+ 39"
4	Manuele Mori (ITA)	Saunier Duval–Prodir	+ 39"
5	José Enrique Gutiérrez (ESP)	Team LPR	+ 45"
6	José Alberto Benítez (ESP)	Saunier Duval–Prodir	+ 55"
7	Jure Golčer (SLO)	Tenax–Menikini	+ 58"
8	Ricardo Serrano (ESP)	Tinkoff Credit Systems	+ 3' 51"
9	Giairo Ermeti (ITA)	Tenax–Menikini	+ 4' 20"
10	Manuele Spadi (ITA)	Ceramica Flaminia–Bossini Docce	+ 4' 22"
