= Eroica =

Eroica is an Italian common woman's name and means "heroic". It may refer to:

== Music ==
- Symphony No. 3 (Beethoven) (Sinfonia Eroica, 1801), by Ludwig van Beethoven
- The Eroica Variations (Variations and Fugue for Piano in E♭ major, Opus 35, 1802), by Ludwig van Beethoven
- Transcendental Étude No. 7 in E-flat, "Eroica" (1837), by Franz Liszt
- The Internet Symphony No. 1 — Eroica, by Tan Dun for the YouTube Symphony Orchestra
- The Eroica Trio, an American chamber music ensemble
- Eroica (album), an album by Wendy & Lisa

== Film ==
- Eroica (1958 film), a film by Andrzej Munk
- Eroica (1949 film), a black-and-white film about Beethoven
- Our Last Spring (Eroica), a 1960 Greek film with an international cast
- Eroica (2003 film), a film about Beethoven produced for television by the BBC, starring Ian Hart

== Other ==
- Eroica, a collaboration wine between Chateau Ste. Michelle and Dr. Ernst Loosen
- Monte Paschi Eroica, a bicycle race in Italy
- From Eroica with Love, a long-running shōjo manga by Yasuko Aoike
- L'Eroica, an annual non-competitive ride on vintage bicycles
