= Beverley to Perth Cycle Race =

Western Australian road bicycle race

The Beverley to Perth Cycle Race (also known as The Beverley) is a road bicycle race conducted between Beverley and Perth in Western Australia. Originally called the Rover Road Race it was established by Percy W. Armstrong, agent for Rover bicycles. It was run in conjunction with the League of W.A. Wheelmen, and had had vice-regal patronage with the Governor of Western Australia's participation as judge. In early years it had also been known as Armstrong's Road Race and the Dunlop Beverley To Perth.

The 116 mile (170 km) event quickly gained a reputation as one of Australia's longest and toughest cycle races, second only in length to the Warrnambool to Melbourne. There were no races in 1900, 1902, or during the First World War. In 1937 Armstrong protested the change of the route in the 1930s. It reversed direction in 1952.

The race continued regularly after the Second World War, and into the 1970s. The last Beverley to Perth was held in 1999. Each October since 2014 the Beverley Heroic has been run from Beverley. The non-competitive event commemorates the history of the Beverly and, in the style of L'Eroica, riders are encouraged to ride pre-1987 bicycles. 2016 saw the return of competitive racing to Beverley with the Beverley Classic added to the Beverley Heroic weekend.
