= Ryder Hesjedal =

Canadian racing cyclist (born 1980)

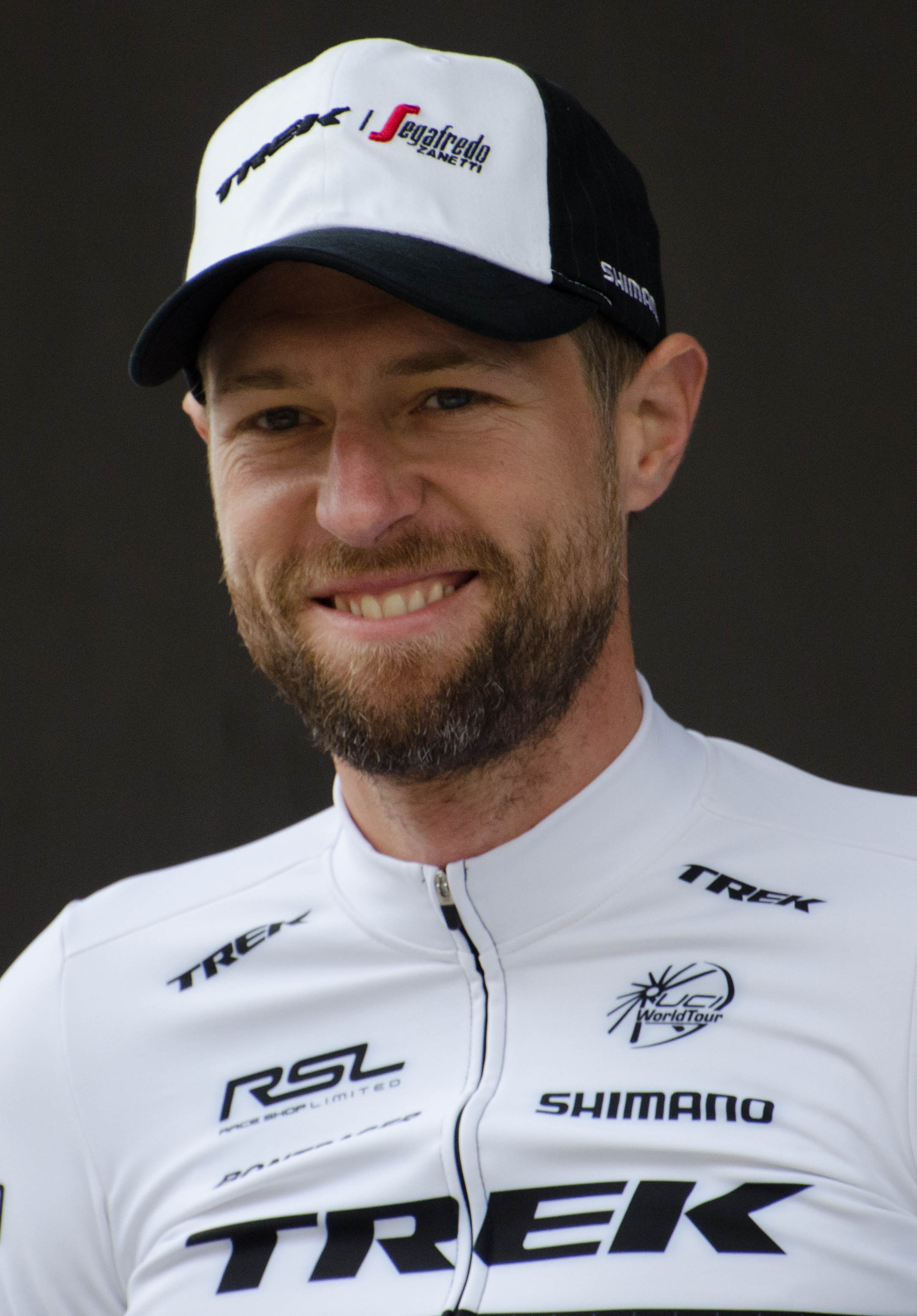
- Hesjedal at the 2016 Tour of Alberta

Personal information
- Full name: Eric Ryder Hesjedal
- Born: December 9, 1980 (age 45) Victoria, British Columbia, Canada
- Height: 1.87 m (6 ft 1 1/2 in)
- Weight: 73 kg (161 lb; 11 st 7 lb)

Cycling career
- Sport: Cycling
- Discipline: Road
- Role: Rider
- Rider type: All-rounder

Amateur teams
- 1999–2004: Gary Fisher (MTB)
- 2002–2003: Rabobank GS3

Professional teams
- 2004–2005: U.S. Postal Service
- 2006: Phonak
- 2007: Health Net–Maxxis
- 2008–2015: Slipstream–Chipotle
- 2016: Trek–Segafredo

Major wins
- Grand Tours Tour de France 1 TTT stage (2011) Giro d'Italia General classification (2012) 2 TTT stages (2008, 2012) Vuelta a España 2 individual stages (2009, 2014) One-day races and Classics National Time Trial Championships (2007)
Medal record
Representing Canada
Men's mountain bike racing
World Championships
Silver medal – second place	2003 Lugano	Cross country

Eric Ryder Hesjedal (/ˈraɪdər ˈhɛʃədɑːl/; born December 9, 1980) is a Canadian retired professional racing cyclist who competed in mountain biking and road racing between 1998 and 2016. Hesjedal won a silver medal at the 1998 Junior, 2001 Under-23, and Elite world championship in mountain biking. He turned professional with U.S. Postal Service in 2004 after several years with the Rabobank continental team. Having previously finished in fifth place at the 2010 Tour de France, Hesjedal won his first and only Grand Tour at the 2012 Giro d'Italia, the first Grand Tour win by a Canadian. Other major wins include two stages at the Vuelta a España, the first such stage wins by a Canadian.

Danish cyclist Michael Rasmussen asserted in his autobiography that he taught Hesjedal how to take erythropoietin (EPO). Hesjedal later admitted that this doping allegation was "the truth" and that he "chose the wrong path". Hesjedal has not served a ban as a result of his confession to USADA, and has publicly expressed a desire to be honest and transparent. VeloNews reported in 2014 that "The 33-year-old Canadian, however, stopped short of explaining what drugs he took, and when".

== Career ==
=== Early career ===
Hesjedal began his career competing as a mountain bike cyclist, with initial success as a two-time world champion in the mountain bike relay event in both 2001 and 2002. He won silver as an individual at the 2003 world mountain biking championships and competed at the 2004 Summer Olympics for Canada in the mountain bike category. At those games, Hesjedal was on his way to an Olympic medal and likely a gold medal before a sharp rock cut and flattened his tire, ending that Olympic dream.

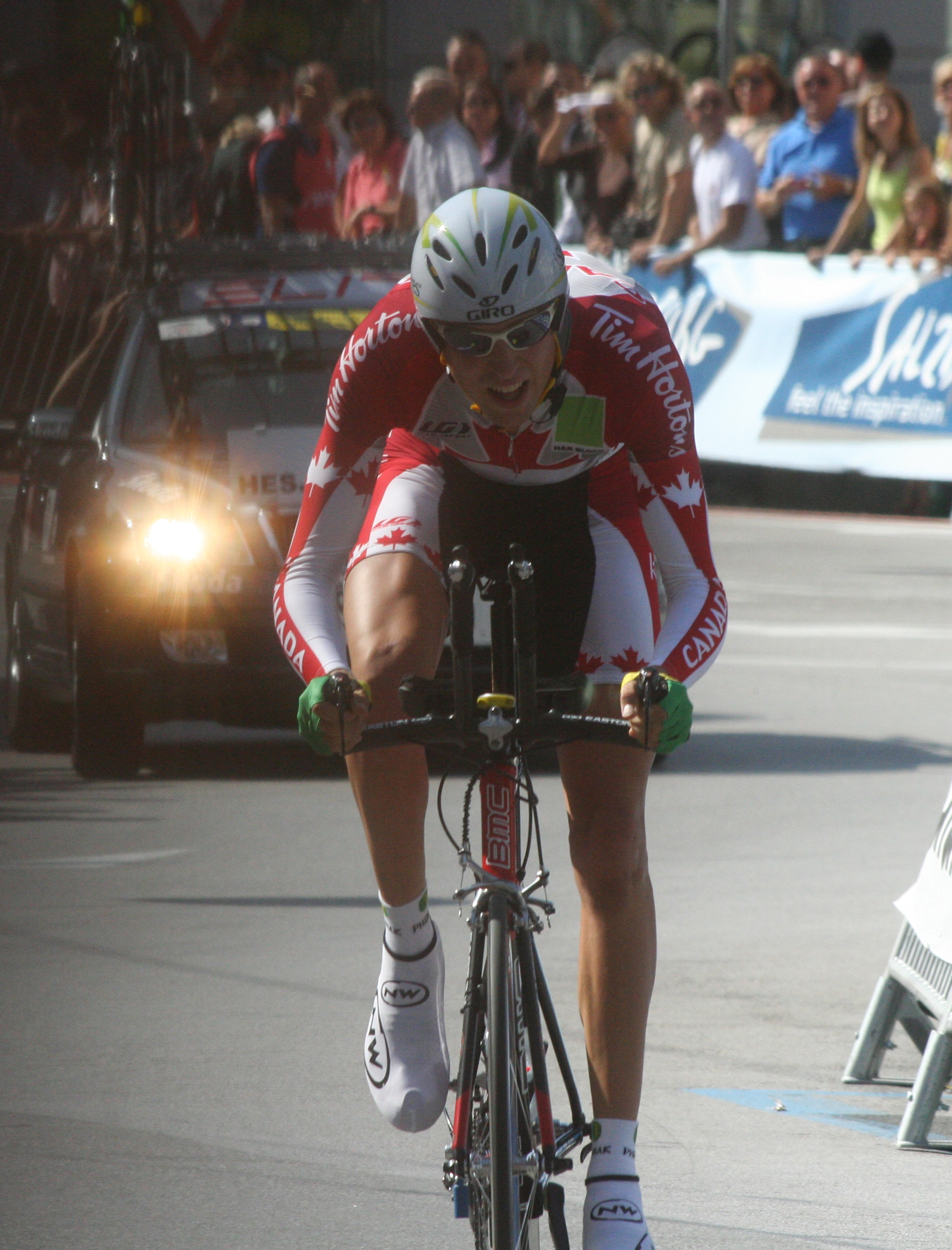
Hesjedal competing in the time trial at the 2006 UCI Road World Championships.

As a result of both the early success and disappointments in his career, this allowed him to make the full-time switch to road cycling. A climber and time trialist, he was selected by Discovery Channel for the 2005 Giro d'Italia and helped Paolo Savoldelli win, although failing to complete the course himself. After 2005 he joined the Swiss team, Phonak, where he began to build some of his best results, finishing fourth in the 2006 Volta a Catalunya and second in the 2006 Canadian National Time Trial Championships. Later that season he rode the Vuelta a España, although he dropped out near the end to concentrate on the UCI Road World Championships in Salzburg. He achieved only modest results; the end of the Phonak team led him to Health Net–Maxxis for 2007.

=== Slipstream–Chipotle (2008–15) ===
For 2008 he joined Slipstream–Chipotle and helped Christian Vande Velde to fourth in the Tour de France.

==== 2009 ====
In 2009 Hesjedal competed in the Vuelta a España. He finished second of the mountainous tenth stage behind Simon Gerrans (Cervélo TestTeam), registering the same time as the victor. He did not miss his chance days later on stage 12 however, when he detached himself from the favourites' group on the final climb to the Alto de Velefique. He joined the lone escapee David García Dapena (Xacobeo–Galicia) and tried to shake him off, but García resisted. Hesjedal outsprinted his rival near the line to take the victory. With that feat, he became the first Canadian to win a Vuelta stage and the first Canadian individual winner of a Grand Tour stage since Steve Bauer in the 1988 Tour de France. However, he abandoned later and did not take the start of the eighteenth stage. Hesjedal was the only Canadian to compete in the Tour de France in both 2008 and 2009 – the first Canadian to ride in the race in more than 10 years.

At the end of the 2009 season, Hesjedal was selected as Canadian cyclist of the decade and male Canadian cyclist of the year. The honour was given to him from Canadian Cyclist and the results came from an online poll. He was also named male international cyclist of the year of 2009 from Cycling BC.

==== 2010 ====
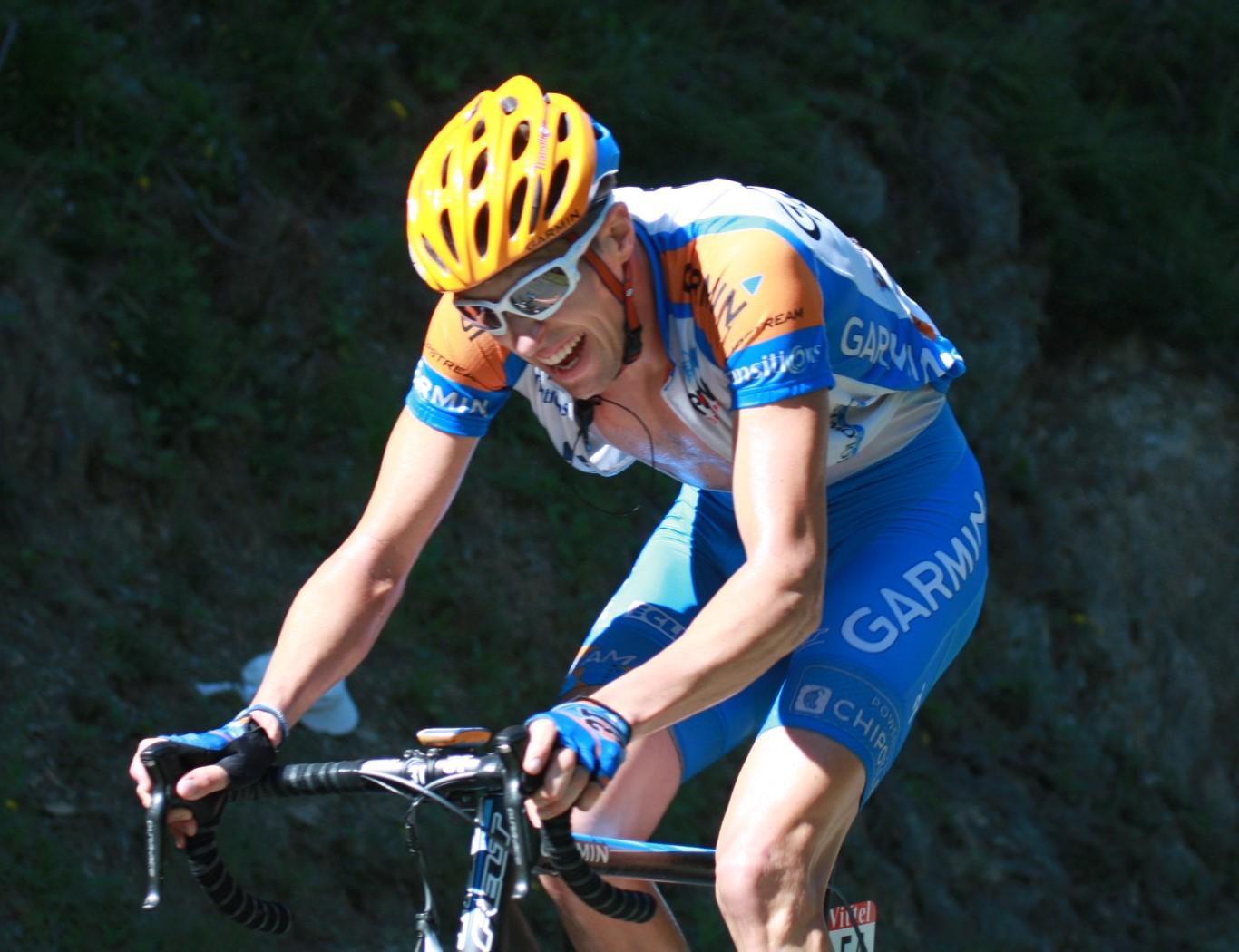
Hesjedal at the 2010 Tour de France

In March, Hesjedal grabbed a good result at the Montepaschi Strade Bianche, an Italian race run partly on dirt roads. He finished fifth, 19 seconds behind the victor, Maxim Iglinsky of Astana, and said that he was happy with his performance. In April, Hesjedal earned a place on the podium in one of the Ardennes classics, the Amstel Gold Race, which ran through the Dutch hills for 257 kilometres (160 mi). In the final kilometre, he attempted to follow the acceleration produced by Philippe Gilbert on the steep Cauberg, but had to settle for second place, two seconds behind Gilbert. Hesjedal rode the Tour of California and finished fifth overall, grabbing a victory on the eighth stage in the process, as he out-sprinted his breakaway companions Chris Horner (Team RadioShack), George Hincapie (BMC Racing Team) and Carlos Barredo (Quick-Step). With that operation he helped secure the overall win of Michael Rogers since Hesjedal appropriated the 10 seconds bonus awarded to stage winners, making sure none of Rogers' rivals could claim it since Rogers had a very narrow lead in the general classification.

During the Tour de France, Hesjedal finished 4th in the third stage, which featured some cobbled sections, after leading by himself for much of the race until being caught in the last 6 kilometres (3.7 miles). He was awarded the most combative rider on the day and thus wore red numbers for the fourth stage. On July 22, Hesjedal again finished fourth, this time on stage 17 on the famed slopes of the Col du Tourmalet. Hesjedal went on to finish fifth in the overall classification of the race, the highest Canadian finish in the race in 22 years, when Bauer finished fourth in the 1988 Tour de France. Hesjedal went on to say of his result:

Ryder Hesjedal

— about his Tour de France 5th place, I hope this result does positive things for Canadian cycling and motivates the next generation of Canadian cyclists. I hope that's the biggest thing that comes out of this... This placing will be there [in the books] forever... If this makes more Canadians aware of cycling, and want to cycle, then it will have been worth it for that alone.

==== 2011 ====
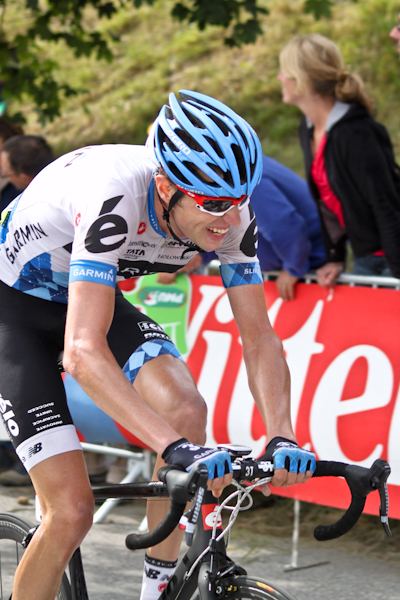
Hesjedal at the 2011 Tour de France.

Hesjedal had a quieter 2011 year, with a few near wins. In April, he put in a spirited effort to finish in ninth position of the Tour of the Basque Country, a World Tour event. He placed in the top 7 for four of the six stages, but went from fifth overall to ninth after the final day individual time trial, where he came in a minute and 52 seconds behind Tony Martin. He performed well in the Tour de France though he did not finish as well as his 6th placing of the previous year. He came 18th overall and was part of Garmin–Cervélo's team time trial victory on stage 2. On the mountainous stage 16 concluding in Gap, Hesjedal came in sight of the finish line with his teammate Thor Hushovd and another Norwegian, Edvald Boasson Hagen. He set his teammate up by taking the first position and riding hard, allowing Hushovd to launch his sprint and take the win, with Hesjedal coming in third. Other notable results from 2011 included a fourth place at the GP Miguel Induráin, a 10th overall spot at the Tour of California, twelfth at the classic La Flèche Wallonne and eleventh on a World Tour race held on his home soil, the Grand Prix Cycliste de Montréal.

==== 2012 ====
Hesjedal rode very strongly in the spring classics, including a 9th placing at Liège–Bastogne–Liège. He also rode the first 4 stages of the Tour de Romandie, but he did not complete the race since Garmin–Barracuda wanted to keep him rested in preparation for the Giro d'Italia, where he would be the team's leader for the overall classification, while his team-mate Tyler Farrar's task would be to contest the sprint finishes.

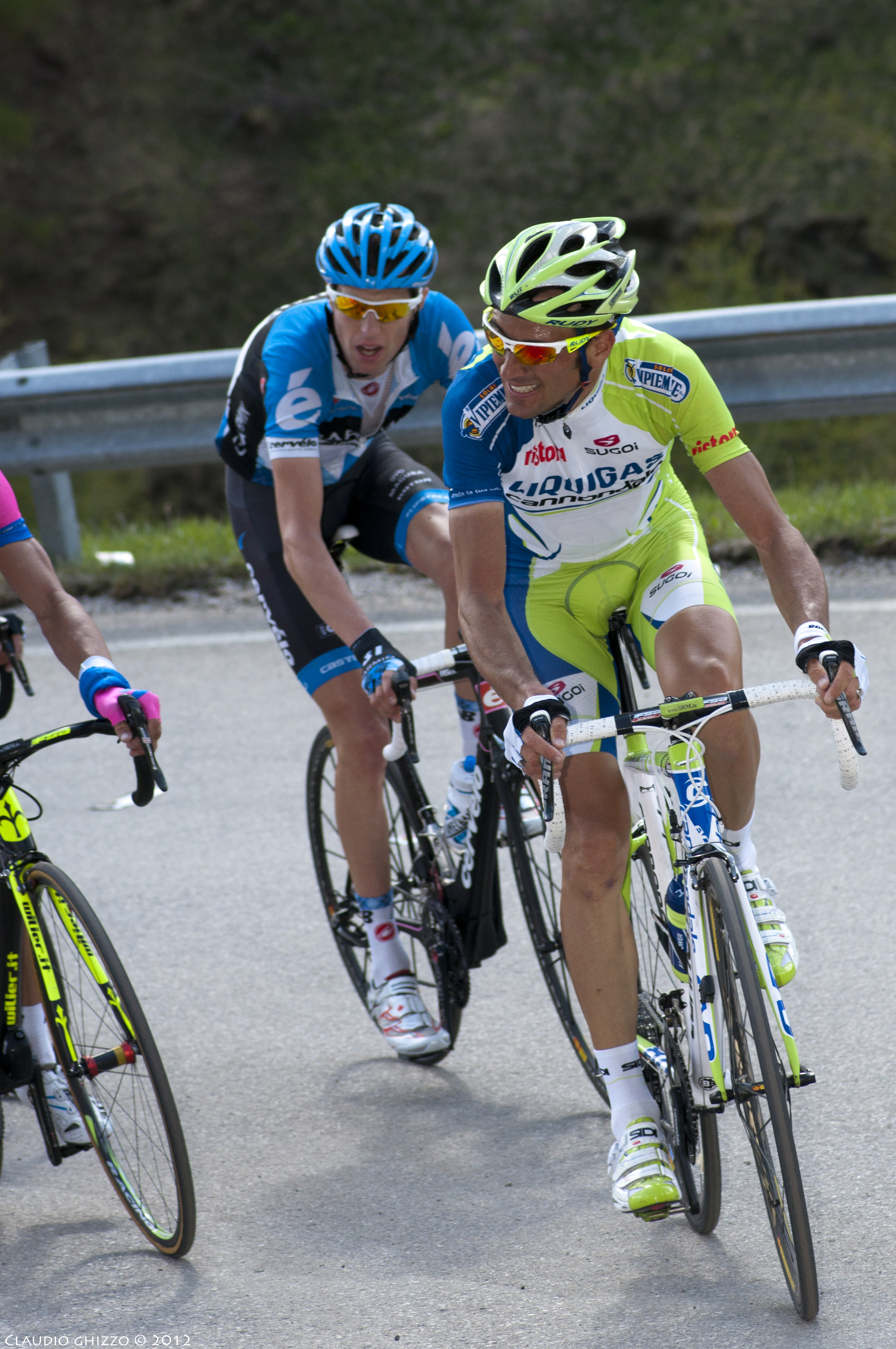
Hesjedal (in blue) at the 2012 Giro d'Italia, following Ivan Basso on the 17th stage.

His Giro that year got off to a good start, Garmin–Barracuda won the team time trial and put Hesjedal in fourth overall and within reach of the overall lead. On May 12, he became the first Canadian to lead the overall classification of the Giro and wear the pink jersey as leader of the general classification. He is the first Canadian rider since Steve Bauer in the 1990 Tour de France to wear an overall classification jersey from a Grand Tour. The event unfolded on stage 7, where the last of the escapees was caught with only 700 metres (2,300 feet) to go. Hesjedal finished 5th in the uphill finish atop Rocca di Cambio, 5 seconds behind stage winner Paolo Tiralongo of Astana, securing the leader's jersey. Though he would eventually lose the jersey to Joaquim Rodríguez, he again donned the pink jersey for the overall lead on stage 14 after attacking on the climb to Breuil-Cervinia and leaving his competitors unable to respond. However, Rodríguez managed to reclaim the overall lead the following day. During the mountain stages of the last week many expected Hesjedal to drop back in the overall standings, however, he remained in the fray hovering between 15 and 30 seconds back of the overall lead. As he was considered a strong time trialist and because he attacked often on the final mountain stages, dropping contenders like Ivan Basso and Michele Scarponi, many were led to believe that Hesjedal would win the Giro on the final day, including race leader Rodríguez who conceded he had not done enough.

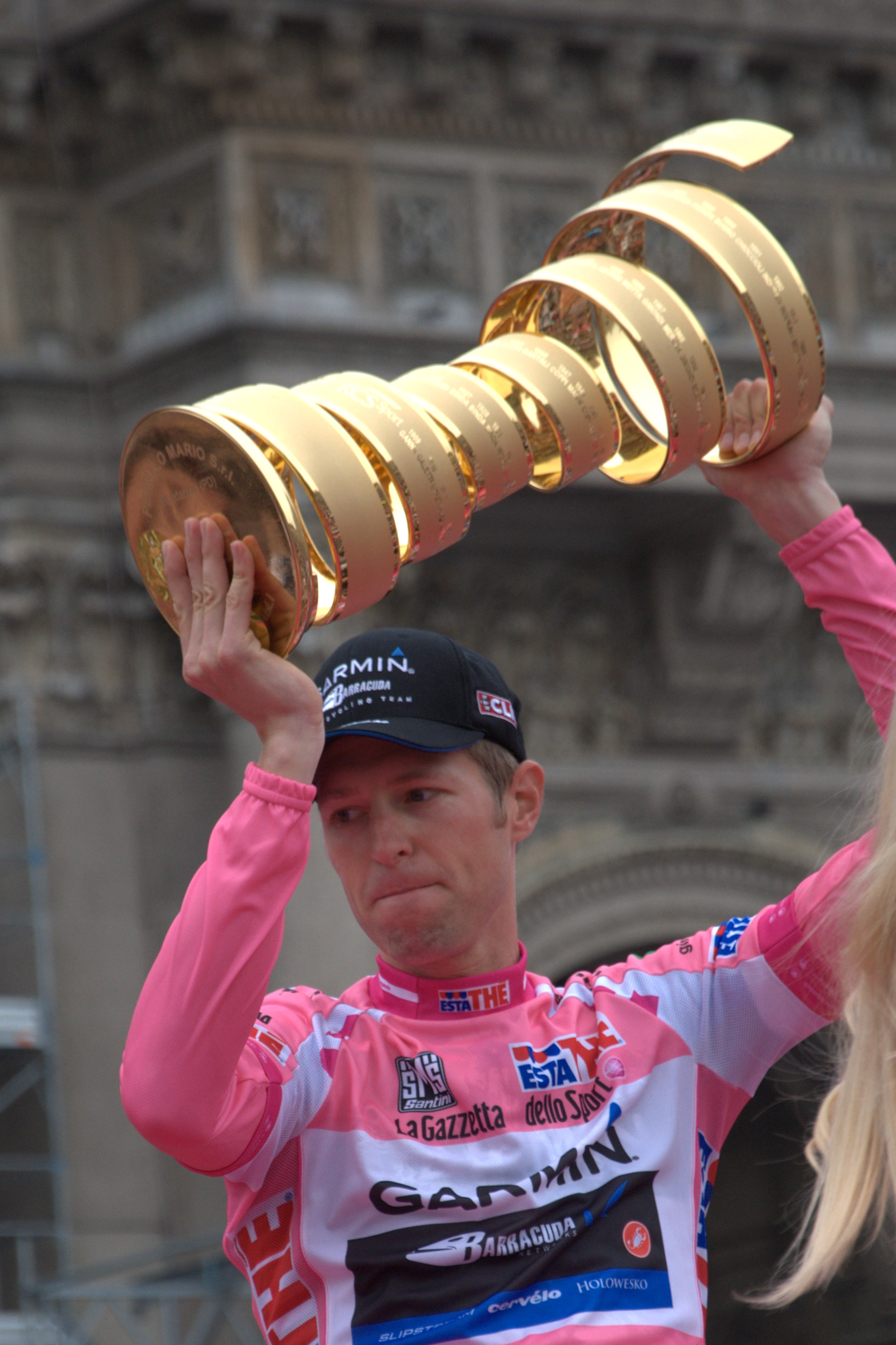
Hesjedal, with the winner's trophy, at the 2012 Giro d'Italia

When in fact the last day of the Giro was run on the streets of Milan for the time trial, Hesjedal completed the course in 34:15 which was indeed enough time to take the pink jersey for the final time. This completed his journey of becoming the first Canadian to win a Grand Tour and only the second time ever that the pink jersey changed hands on the last day of the Giro. His title was also notable in that it was completed on an entirely Canadian-made-and-manufactured bicycle by Cervélo. The victory elicited an immediate response from his home country of Canada, with the Prime Minister of Canada, Stephen Harper releasing a statement saying "We thank Mr. Hesjedal for this defining moment in Canadian sport. This remarkable win in one of bicycle racing's most gruelling competitions is a testimony to Mr. Hesjedal's training, endurance, skill and competitive spirit." Premier of British Columbia Christy Clark added that "For a British Columbian to have done this is amazing. I know this is going to go down as one of the great Canadian accomplishments ever in sport."

Allan Peiper, the Garmin team's sporting director compared Hesjedal's 16 second victory to that of 2011 Tour de France winner Cadel Evans' victory. He noted the similarities in the fight to stay within striking distance on the final mountain stages and then the time-trial to victory that both riders had. Of his own final ride up the Stelvio Pass, Hesjedal said that "I was a bit concerned. As we approached the last part of the Stelvio, none of my rivals were willing to work to conserve their positions, either ... Those are all the tactics and situations. I basically had to save my own Giro in the last five [kilometres]. It was a huge effort."

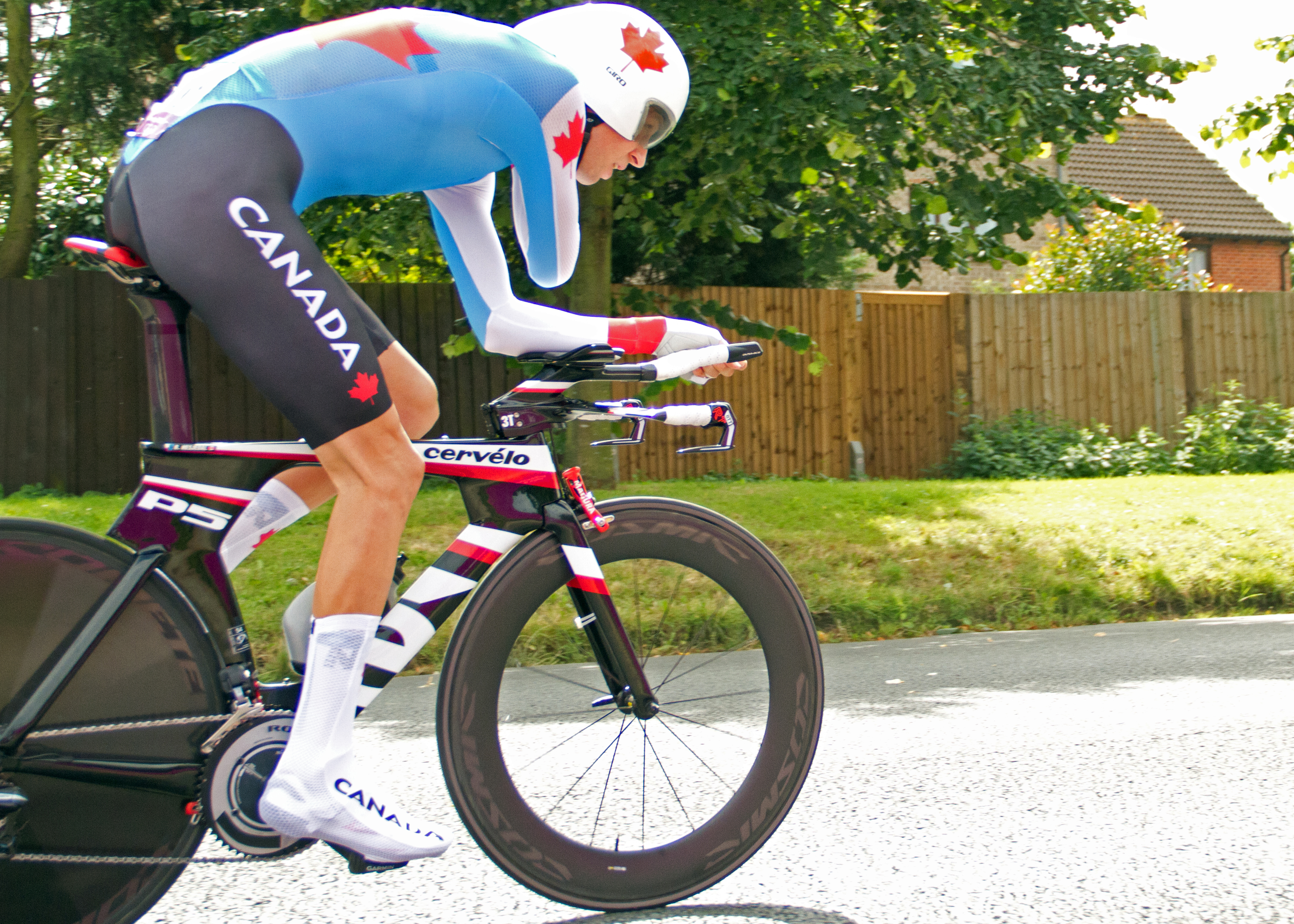
Hesjedal during the time trial at the 2012 Olympics.

With his successful Giro, questions were asked if he would still ride the Tour de France. It was announced in early June that he would be Garmin's team leader for the Tour. Hesjedal was also announced as Canada's male rider in the Summer Olympics by the Canadian Olympic Committee in June. At the Tour de France, he was close to the overall lead in 8th, 18 seconds back, from the prologue through the first five stages. Hesjedal was then involved in a massive crash during the 6th stage that put him 13 minutes behind and out of contention for the general classification. The following day, Hesjedal withdrew from the event due to the injuries to his leg and hip. The Summer Olympics went on with underwhelming results from Hesjedal where he finished 63rd in the road race and 28th as Canada's lone entry in the time trial competition.

In the fall, Hesjedal had a strong showing in the Italian classic Giro di Lombardia, where he finished sixth in a race that was marked by heavy rain and low temperatures, as only 54 riders out of 197 completed the race. He then looked to end his season on a high note at the Tour of Beijing, putting it all on the line on the hilly fifth stage, where he attacked relentlessly. Only BMC Racing Team rider Steve Cummings could follow him as he tried to put as much distance as possible between himself and race leader Tony Martin. Hesjedal missed his gamble however, was out-sprinted by Cummings for the victory and had to settle for second place for the stage and 18th in the overall classification.

For his strong results over the year and particularly his Giro overall victory, Hesjedal was given the Lionel Conacher Award as Canada's male athlete of the year.

==== 2013 ====
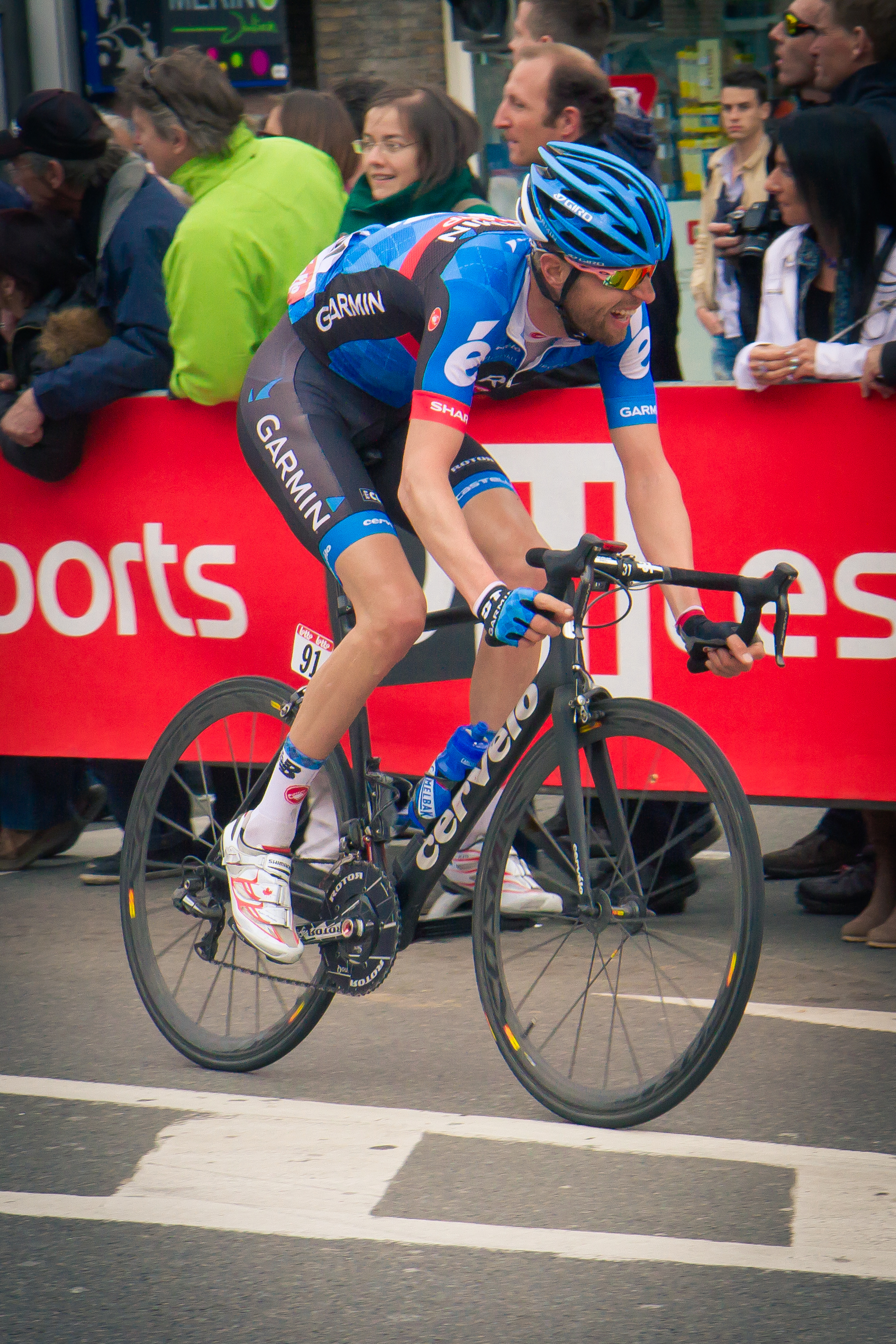
Hesjedal at the 2013 Liège–Bastogne–Liège, where he finished in eighth place.

Hesjedal's first race of the season was the Volta a Catalunya, where he helped set up his teammate Dan Martin for the general classification victory, while preparing himself for his top priority of the season, the Giro d'Italia. Hesjedal rode some spring classics, including Liège–Bastogne–Liège, where he attempted a solo breakaway on the Côte de Colonster with about 15 km (9.3 mi) to cover. He was later swept by a small chasing group containing teammate Martin. Hesjedal took some pulls at the front of the group and once again played a role in Martin's victory, taking the eighth place for himself.

At the Giro d'Italia, Hesjedal was aggressive on the third stage, breaking away solo on the last climb and then imposing a hard tempo on the descent with rival Vincenzo Nibali, which caused a lot of riders to crash on the rain-soaked tarmac while trying to follow. Hesjedal finished third on the stage in a select sprint, awarding himself an eight-second bonus for doing so. After positive results, Hesjedal, however, had several setbacks, which pushed him far back in the peloton of the general classification. Following Stage 12, he withdrew from the race. Misery again followed Hesjedal when he suffered a crash in the Stage 1 of the Tour de France breaking a rib. Despite this he would continue on in the Tour, but finished only 70th in the overall standings.

==== 2014 ====
Hesjedal started the season by scoring a top 10 result in the overall classification of the Giro d'Italia, finishing in ninth position. On Stage 7 of the Vuelta a España, Hesjedal was in a breakaway of four that would make it to the line, but he crashed in a bend and a race motorcycle then accidentally rode on his bike. He finished second on the stage after changing his machine. Controversy arose when it was noted that his bike continued to freewheel when he was on the ground after the crash, spinning as if the back wheel was propelled by an engine. However, the fact that the cranks were not turning on their own as the bike was on the ground and a video posted by former teammate Alex Rasmussen demonstrating how the event could happen to any bike cast doubt upon the conspiracy theory. Hesjedal stated the claims were 'ridiculous and funny', and won the combativity award after that stage. On Stage 14, Hesjedal was once again part of an early escape and took victory by passing Oliver Zaugg in the last 200 metres (660 feet) of the uphill finish, which had gradients of approximately 15%.

==== 2015 ====
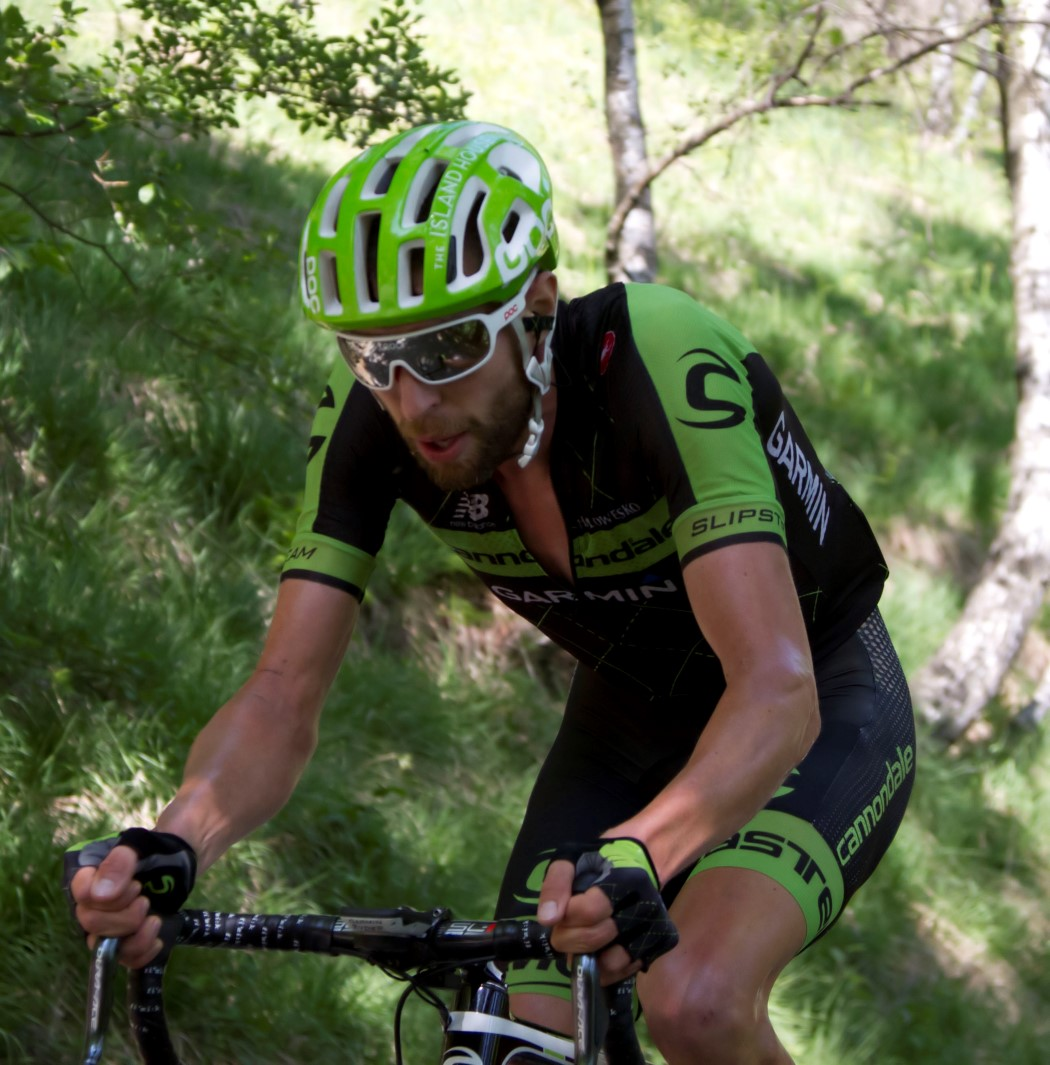
Hesjedal at the 2015 Giro d'Italia

2015 saw a merger between Cannondale and Garmin–Sharp, which became Cannondale–Garmin and included Hesjedal as part of their roster. The beginning of the season was somewhat discreet for Hesjedal, who failed to make an impression in the races before April. He was however named as the leader for his team for the mountainous Giro del Trentino. The ordeal got off to a bad start as Hesjedal lost 2:46 on Stage 2 to the winner of the day, Richie Porte. Hesjedal went on to finish the race in fourteenth position. At the Giro d'Italia, Hesjedal lost some time in the first week because of his tendency to ride behind the peloton. However, he was stronger in the third week and clawed his way back to the top ten in the mountainous Stages 18 and 19. In the latter stage, he was second to Fabio Aru. On stage 20 featuring the unpaved Colle delle Finestre, Hesjedal gained some more time and passed Leopold König and Steven Kruijswijk on general classification after finishing once again second to Aru.

=== Trek–Segafredo (2016) ===
In August 2015, it was announced that Hesjedal had signed with Trek–Segafredo for the 2016 season.

Hesjedal competed at the Giro d'Italia, however he dropped out of the race on the fourteenth stage due to stomach problems. He subsequently rode at the Critérium du Dauphiné in support of Bauke Mollema, however he was not selected for the Tour de France, and subsequently withdrew himself from consideration for the Canadian team for the Olympics. In August Trek–Segafredo announced that Hesjedal would retire at the end of the season, and that although his final race had not been decided, he would compete in his homeland in the Tour of Alberta, Grand Prix Cycliste de Québec and the Grand Prix Cycliste de Montréal.

== Doping ==
In October 2013, following allegations in Michael Rasmussen's book "Yellow Fever", Hesjedal admitted to doping earlier in his career, describing it as his "part in the dark past of the sport". In a statement, United States Anti-Doping Agency (USADA) chief executive officer (CEO) Travis Tygart confirmed that Hesjedal had told anti-doping authorities about his use of performance enhancing drugs (PED) during his racing career. In his public statement published by VeloNews, Hesjedal admitted to doping, adding: "It's not an excuse, but I felt then that it was my only choice." Hesjedal narrowly won the 2012 Giro d'Italia on the final time trial stage. Scientific research posted by USADA has noted both positive and negative long-term effects of PED use including physiological adaptations that can increase performance well after the final dosage.

In 2004, fellow British Columbian racer Geoff Kabush failed to qualify for the 2004 Summer Olympics after Hesjedal and Seamus McGrath took Canada's two spots for the men's cross-country. Both would later admit to doping in the 2003 season. According to VeloNews, Kabush stated "he does not believe those riders only doped in 2003", having trained with them in the early 2000s. Hesjedal has yet to identify exactly when he doped and for how long.

== Personal life ==
Hesjedal was born in Victoria, British Columbia. His great-grandparents were Norwegian immigrants from Beiarn Municipality in Nordland county and also from the Hesjedal Farm in Stamnes in Vaksdal Municipality. Both his parents worked for the Capital Regional District in Victoria. A head injury sustained during his time racing mountain bikes has left Hesjedal without a sense of smell.

Following the 2012 Giro d'Italia, Hesjedal helped start a charitable group called the "Ryders Cycling Society of Canada", whose stated aim is "to create and sustain opportunities for young Canadians to ride bicycles." Hesjedal also auctioned a pink jersey he wore as leader of the General classification in the Giro d'Italia for $10,000, and distributed it to help young Canadian cyclists.

Hesjedal now resides in his hometown of Victoria, British Columbia.

== Major results ==
=== Mountain bike ===
1998
2nd Cross-country, UCI World Junior Championships
1999
3rd Team relay, UCI World Championships
2001
UCI World Championships

1st Team relay
2nd Under-23 cross-country

UCI Cross-country World Cup

2nd Mont-Sainte-Anne

2002
UCI World Championships

1st Team relay
3rd Under-23 cross-country

UCI Cross-country World Cup

1st Les Gets

2003
2nd Cross-country, UCI World Championships

=== Road ===
2002
1st Paris–Mantes-en-Yvelines
2004
5th Klasika Primavera
2005
3rd Time trial, National Road Championships
2006
2nd Time trial, National Road Championships
4th Overall Volta a Catalunya
2007
1st Time trial, National Road Championships
1st Mountains classification, Tour de Georgia
7th Overall Tour of the Gila
10th Overall Tour of California
2008
1st Stage 1 (TTT) Giro d'Italia
3rd Grand Prix d'Ouverture La Marseillaise
8th Overall Tirreno–Adriatico
10th Monte Paschi Eroica
2009
1st Stage 12 Vuelta a España
4th Clásica de San Sebastián
8th Overall Tirreno–Adriatico
10th Monte Paschi Strade Bianche
2010
2nd Amstel Gold Race
3rd Grand Prix Cycliste de Montréal
4th Grand Prix Cycliste de Québec
5th Overall Tour de France
5th Overall Tour of California

1st Stage 8

5th Montepaschi Strade Bianche
6th Overall Volta a Catalunya
6th Clásica de San Sebastián
7th UCI World Ranking
7th Coppa Ugo Agostoni
9th La Flèche Wallonne
2011
1st Stage 2 (TTT) Tour de France
4th GP Miguel Induráin
6th Trofeo Inca
7th Overall Critérium International
7th Trofeo Deia
9th Overall Tour of the Basque Country
10th Overall Tour of California
2012
1st Overall Giro d'Italia

1st Stage 4 (TTT)

6th Giro di Lombardia
9th Liège–Bastogne–Liège
2013
3rd Grand Prix Cycliste de Montréal
8th Liège–Bastogne–Liège
2014
1st Stage 14 Vuelta a España
6th GP Miguel Induráin
9th Overall Giro d'Italia
2015
5th Overall Giro d'Italia

==== General classification results timeline ====
Grand Tour general classification results timeline
Grand Tour	2005	2006	2007	2008	2009	2010	2011	2012	2013	2014	2015	2016
Giro d'Italia	DNF	—	—	60	—	—	—	1	DNF	9	5	DNF
Tour de France	—	—	—	46	46	5	17	DNF	70	—	40	—
Vuelta a España	—	DNF	—	—	DNF	—	—	—	—	24	—	—
Major stage race general classification results timeline
Race	2005	2006	2007	2008	2009	2010	2011	2012	2013	2014	2015	2016
Paris–Nice	—	—	—	—	—	—	33	—	—	—	—	—
/ Tirreno–Adriatico	—	37	—	8	8	39	—	—	—	—	DNF	—
Volta a Catalunya	—	4	—	—	—	6	—	75	66	15	104	126
Tour of the Basque Country	—	—	—	—	57	11	9	19	DNF	36	—	DNF
Tour de Romandie	32	—	—	—	—	—	—	DNF	DNF	—	24	DNF
Critérium du Dauphiné	—	17	—	—	—	—	—	—	—	25	—	78
Tour de Suisse	—	—	—	—	18	DNF	20	—	DNF	—	—	—

=== Classics results timeline ===
Monument	2004	2005	2006	2007	2008	2009	2010	2011	2012	2013	2014	2015	2016
Milan–San Remo	—	—	—	—	—	31	—	—	—	—	—	—	—
Tour of Flanders	DNF	—	51	—	81	—	—	—	—	—	—	—	—
Paris–Roubaix	—	DNF	DNF	—	—	—	—	—	—	—	—	—	—
Liège–Bastogne–Liège	—	DNF	—	—	51	11	12	29	9	8	77	—	60
Giro di Lombardia	—	—	—	—	—	—	—	—	6	—	33	—	DNF
Classic	2004	2005	2006	2007	2008	2009	2010	2011	2012	2013	2014	2015	2016
Strade Bianche	Race did not exist			—	10	10	5	12	35	—	—	75	—
Amstel Gold Race	—	113	—	—	81	34	2	139	15	26	—	—	DNF
La Flèche Wallonne	DNF	64	—	—	39	25	9	12	21	19	DNF	—	142
Clásica de San Sebastián	—	—	60	—	—	4	6	18	—	DNF	—	66	110
Grand Prix Cycliste de Québec	Race did not exist						4	27	94	39	—	16	20
Grand Prix Cycliste de Montréal	Race did not exist						3	11	23	3	—	DNF	19

Legend
—	Did not compete
DNF	Did not finish
DSQ	Disqualified
NH	Not held
