= 2009 Monte Paschi Strade Bianche - Eroica Toscana =

2009 UCI Europe Tour

Race details
- Dates: 7 March 2009
- Stages: 1
- Distance: 190 km (118.1 mi)
- Winning time: 4h 59' 02"

Results
	Winner	Thomas Löfkvist (SWE)	(Team Columbia–High Road)
	Second	Fabian Wegmann (GER)	(Team Milram)
	Third	Martin Elmiger (SUI)	(Ag2r–La Mondiale)

The 2009 Monte Paschi Strade Bianche - Eroica Toscana was the third edition of the Strade Bianche road bicycle race, held on 7 March 2009 in Tuscany, Italy. (Note: The race was called Strade Bianche for the first time and organizers added Eroica Toscana to the name as a one-time occasion because of a sponsorship deal with the region Tuscany.) The race was 190 km, starting in Gaiole in Chianti and finishing in Siena, and included eight sectors of strade bianche, totaling 57,2 km of gravel road. Compared to the previous edition of the Strade Bianche, the race was 10 km longer and featured one more sector of sterrato.

Swedish rider Thomas Lövkvist won the race ahead of German Fabian Wegmann and Swiss Martin Elmiger. Linus Gerdemann attacked five kilometres from the finish, but faded on the steep climb to the centre of Siena and was caught and passed by a chase group. Thomas Lövkvist powered up the cobbled street and was the first to enter the Piazza del Campo and crossed the line 4 seconds ahead of Wegmann and Elmiger. Edvald Boasson Hagen was fourth at eight seconds.

== Results ==
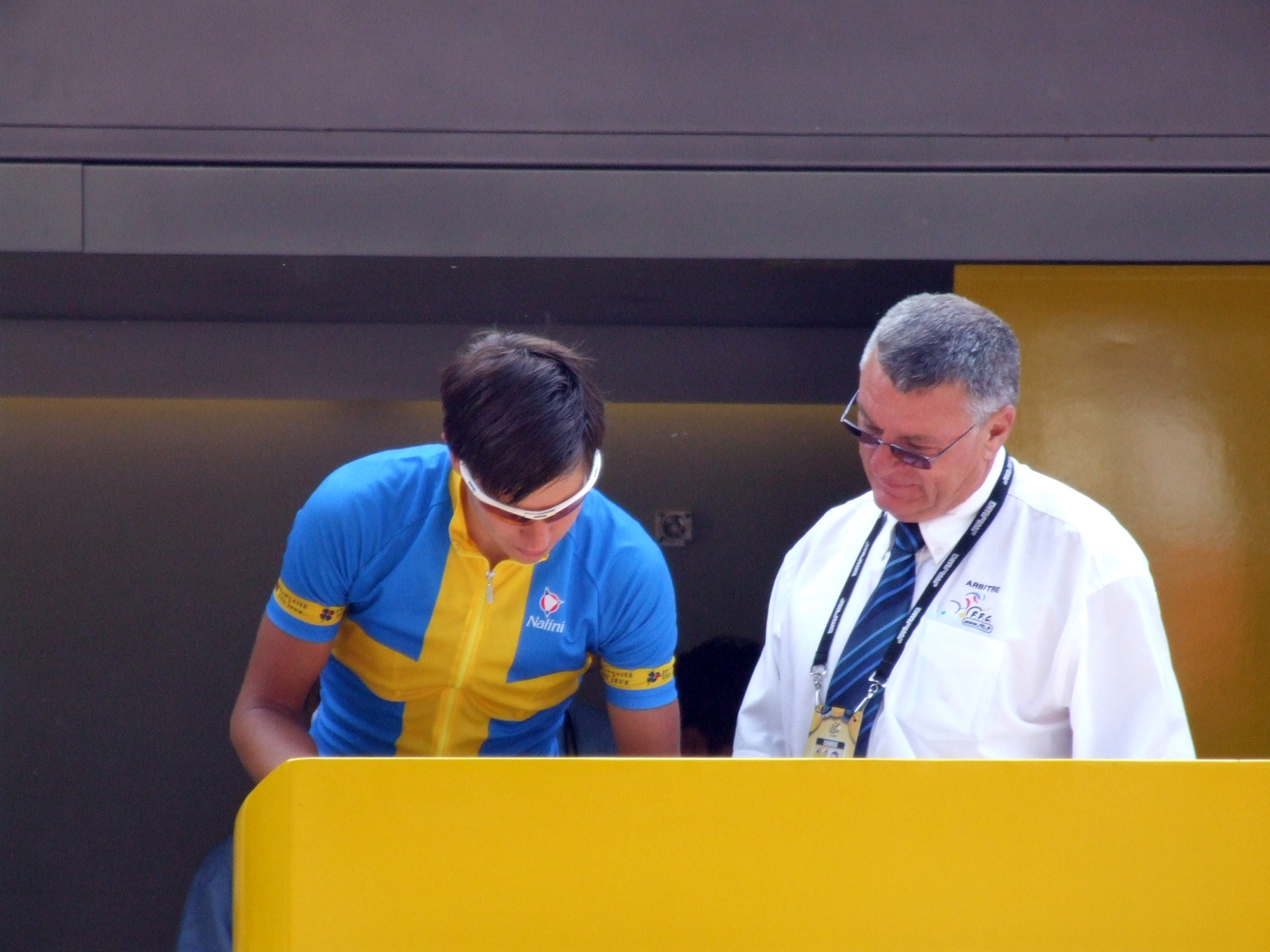
Thomas Lövkvist (pictured in 2006) won the third edition of the Strade Bianche.

Race result
Rank	Rider	Team	Time
1	Thomas Lövkvist (SWE)	Team Columbia–High Road	4h 59' 02"
2	Fabian Wegmann (GER)	Team Milram	+ 4"
3	Martin Elmiger (SUI)	Team Columbia–High Road	+ 6"
4	Edvald Boasson Hagen (NOR)	Team Columbia–High Road	+ 8"
5	Linus Gerdemann (GER)	Team Milram	+ 12"
6	Giovanni Visconti (ITA)	ISD	+ 14"
7	Peter Velits (SVK)	Team Milram	+ 14"
8	Andy Schleck (LUX)	Team Saxo Bank	+ 16"
9	Daniel Lloyd (GBR)	Cervélo TestTeam	+ 19"
10	Ryder Hesjedal (CAN)	Garmin–Slipstream	+ 22"
