= 2009 Bayern Rundfahrt =

Race details
- Dates: 27–31 May 2009
- Stages: 5
- Distance: 740.5 km (460.1 mi)
- Winning time: 17h 29' 05"

Results
	Winner	Linus Gerdemann (GER)
	Second	Maxime Monfort (BEL)
	Third	David Lelay (FRA)

The 2009 Bayern Rundfahrt was the 30th edition of the Bayern Rundfahrt cycle race and was held on 27 May to 31 May 2009. The race started in Kelheim and finished in Gunzenhausen. The race was won by Linus Gerdemann.

== General classification ==
Final general classification

Rank	Rider	Time
1	Linus Gerdemann (GER)	17h 29' 05"
2	Maxime Monfort (BEL)	+ 10"
3	David Lelay (FRA)	+ 26"
4	Lasse Bøchman (DEN)	+ 45"
5	Markus Eibegger (AUT)	+ 1' 30"
6	Sylvain Calzati (FRA)	+ 1' 38"
7	Stefan Denifl (AUT)	+ 1' 39"
8	Thomas Peterson (USA)	+ 2' 32"
9	Simon Geschke (GER)	+ 3' 11"
10	Thomas De Gendt (BEL)	+ 3' 12"
