= 2008 Deutschland Tour =

2008 UCI ProTour, race 13 of 15
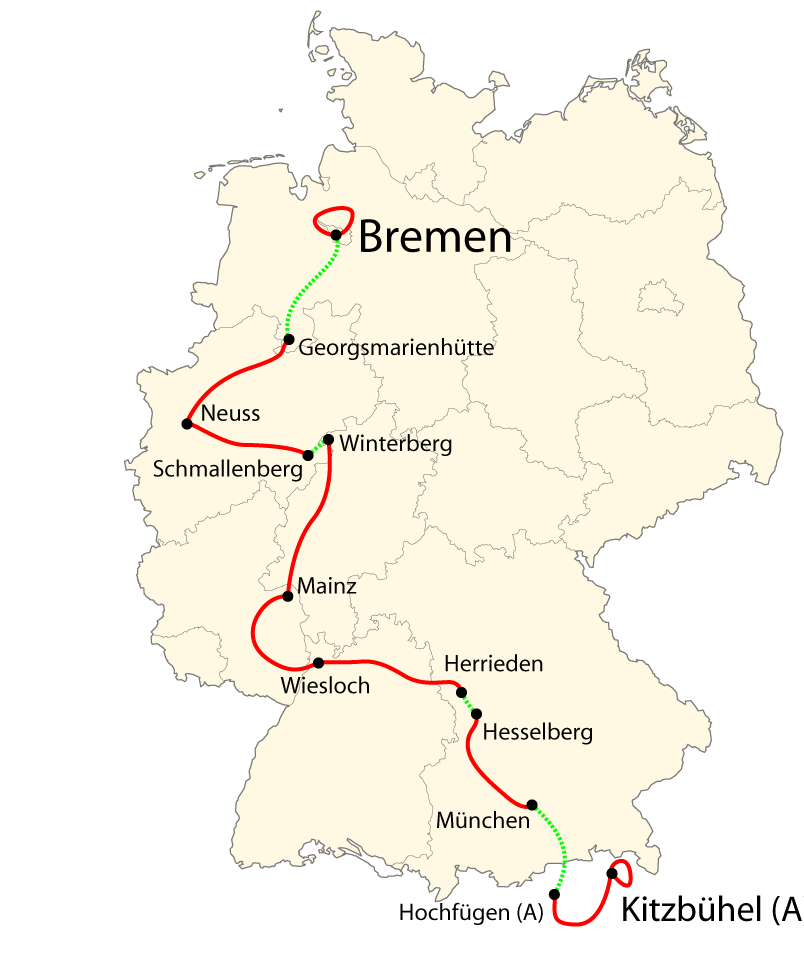
- Overview of the stages

Race details
- Dates: August 29–September 6
- Stages: 1
- Distance: 1,408.6 km (875.3 mi)

Results
	Winner	Linus Gerdemann (GER)	(Team Columbia)

The 2008 Deutschland Tour road cycling race took place from August 29 to September 6, 2008, in Germany and Austria. It was won by Team Columbia's Linus Gerdemann of Germany. It was the 32nd edition of the Deutschland Tour, and the last edition until the race's revival in 2018.

== Stages ==
=== Prologue Kitzbühel 3.6 km Friday, August 29 ===
Prologue Result

	Cyclist	Team	Results
1	Brett Lancaster (AUS)	Team Milram	3' 59"
2	Gustav Larsson (SWE)	CSC–Saxo Bank	s.t
3	Gerald Ciolek (GER)	Team Columbia	+ 2"

General Classification after the Prologue

	Cyclist	Team	Time
1	Brett Lancaster (AUS)	Team Milram	3' 59"
2	Gustav Larsson (SWE)	CSC–Saxo Bank	s.t
3	Gerald Ciolek (GER)	Team Columbia	+ 2"

=== Stage 1 Kitzbühel–Hochfügen 178 km Saturday, August 30 ===
Stage 1 Result

	Cyclist	Team	Results
1	Linus Gerdemann (GER)	Team Columbia	4h 42' 54"
2	Thomas Lövkvist (SWE)	Team Columbia	+ 16"
3	Janez Brajkovič (SLO)	Astana	s.t.

General Classification after stage 1

	Cyclist	Team	Time
1	Linus Gerdemann (GER)	Team Columbia	4h 46' 57"
2	Thomas Lövkvist (SWE)	Team Columbia	+ 17"
3	Janez Brajkovič (SLO)	Astana	+ 20"

=== Stage 2 Munich–Hesselberg 183 km Sunday, August 31 ===
Stage 2 Result

	Cyclist	Team	Results
1	David de la Fuente (ESP)	Scott–American Beef	3h 48' 38"
2	Pietro Caucchioli (ITA)	Crédit Agricole	+ 1"
3	Thomas Lövkvist (SWE)	Team Columbia	s.t.

General Classification after stage 2

	Cyclist	Team	Time
1	Linus Gerdemann (GER)	Team Columbia	8h 35' 37"
2	Thomas Lövkvist (SWE)	Team Columbia	+ 17"
3	Janez Brajkovič (SLO)	Astana	+ 20"

=== Stage 3 Herrieden–Wiesloch 214.9 km Monday, September 1 ===
Stage 3 Result

	Cyclist	Team	Results
1	Leonardo Bertagnolli (ITA)	Liquigas	5h 20' 34"
2	Rigoberto Urán (COL)	Caisse d'Epargne	s.t.
3	Thomas Lövkvist (SWE)	Team Columbia	s.t.

General Classification after stage 3

	Cyclist	Team	Time
1	Linus Gerdemann (GER)	Team Columbia	13h 56' 11"
2	Thomas Lövkvist (SWE)	Team Columbia	+ 17"
3	Janez Brajkovič (SLO)	Astana	+ 20"

=== Stage 4 Wiesloch–Mainz 174 km Tuesday, September 2 ===
Stage 4 Result

	Cyclist	Team	Results
1	André Greipel (GER)	Team Columbia	3h 59' 37"
2	Robbie McEwen (AUS)	Silence–Lotto	s.t.
3	Robert Förster (GER)	Gerolsteiner	s.t.

General Classification after stage 4

	Cyclist	Team	Time
1	Linus Gerdemann (GER)	Team Columbia	17h 55' 48"
2	Thomas Lövkvist (SWE)	Team Columbia	+ 17"
3	Janez Brajkovič (SLO)	Astana	+ 20"

=== Stage 5 Mainz–Winterberg 218.4 km Wednesday, September 3 ===
Stage 5 Result

	Cyclist	Team	Results
1	Gerald Ciolek (GER)	Team Columbia	5h 39' 35"
2	Rubens Bertogliati (SUI)	Scott–American Beef	s.t.
3	Leonardo Bertagnolli (ITA)	Liquigas	s.t.

General Classification after stage 5

	Cyclist	Team	Time
1	Linus Gerdemann (GER)	Team Columbia	23h 35' 23"
2	Thomas Lövkvist (SWE)	Team Columbia	+ 17"
3	Janez Brajkovič (SLO)	Astana	+ 20"

=== Stage 6 Schmallenberg–Neuss 188.8 km Thursday, September 4 ===
Stage 6 Result

	Cyclist	Team	Results
1	Jussi Veikkanen (FIN)	Française des Jeux	4h 17' 22"
2	Maxim Iglinsky (KAZ)	Astana	s.t.
3	Thierry Hupond (FRA)	Skil–Shimano	s.t.

General Classification after stage 6

	Cyclist	Team	Time
1	Linus Gerdemann (GER)	Team Columbia	27h 54' 45"
2	Thomas Lövkvist (SWE)	Team Columbia	+ 17"
3	Janez Brajkovič (SLO)	Astana	+ 20"

=== Stage 7 Neuss–Georgsmarienhütte 214.3 km Friday, September 5 ===
Stage 7 Result

	Cyclist	Team	Results
1	Stéphane Augé (FRA)	Cofidis	4h 45' 33"
2	Thierry Hupond (FRA)	Skil–Shimano	s.t.
3	Mauro Da Dalto (ITA)	Liquigas	s.t.

General Classification after stage 7

	Cyclist	Team	Time
1	Linus Gerdemann (GER)	Team Columbia	32h 44' 12"
2	Thomas Lövkvist (SWE)	Team Columbia	+ 17"
3	Janez Brajkovič (SLO)	Astana	+ 20"

=== Stage 8 - September 6, 2008: > ===
Stage 8 Result

	Cyclist	Team	Results
1	Tony Martin (GER)	Team Columbia	39' 49"
2	Bert Grabsch (GER)	Team Columbia	+34"
3	Gustav Larsson (SWE)	CSC–Saxo Bank	+48"

General Classification after stage 8

	Cyclist	Team	Time
1	Linus Gerdemann (GER)	Team Columbia	33h 25' 18"
2	Thomas Lövkvist (SWE)	Team Columbia	+ 52"
3	Janez Brajkovič (SLO)	Astana	+ 1.34"

== Jersey progress ==
Stage (Winner)	General classification	Points classification	Mountains classification	Young rider classification	Team classification
Prologue (Brett Lancaster)	Brett Lancaster	Brett Lancaster	not awarded	Gerald Ciolek	Team Milram
Stage 1 (Linus Gerdemann)	Linus Gerdemann	Linus Gerdemann	Daniel Musiol	Thomas Lövkvist	Astana
Stage 2 (David de la Fuente)	Linus Gerdemann	Linus Gerdemann	Daniel Musiol	Thomas Lövkvist	Astana
Stage 3 (Leonardo Bertagnolli)	Linus Gerdemann	Thomas Lövkvist	Daniel Musiol	Thomas Lövkvist	Caisse d'Epargne
Stage 4 (André Greipel)	Linus Gerdemann	Thomas Lövkvist	Daniel Musiol	Thomas Lövkvist	Caisse d'Epargne
Stage 5 (Gerald Ciolek)	Linus Gerdemann	Thomas Lövkvist	Daniel Musiol	Thomas Lövkvist	Caisse d'Epargne
Stage 6 (Jussi Veikkanen)	Linus Gerdemann	Thomas Lövkvist	Daniel Musiol	Thomas Lövkvist	Astana
Stage 7 (Stéphane Augé)	Linus Gerdemann	Thomas Lövkvist	Daniel Musiol	Thomas Lövkvist	Astana
Stage 8 (Tony Martin)
