= Linus Gerdemann =

German cyclist

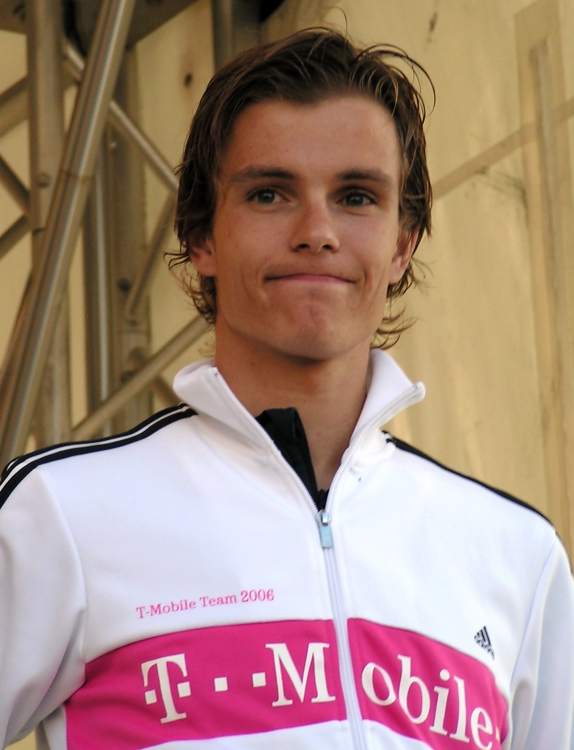
- Gerdemann at the 2006 Deutschland Tour.

Personal information
- Full name: Linus Gerdemann
- Born: 16 September 1982 (age 44) Münster, West Germany

Cycling career
- Sport: Cycling
- Current team: Retired
- Discipline: Road
- Role: Rider

Amateur teams
- 2003: Winfix–Techem
- 2004: Winfix Arnolds Sicherheit

Professional teams
- 2005: Team CSC
- 2006–2008: T-Mobile Team
- 2009–2010: Team Milram
- 2011–2012: Leopard Trek
- 2014: MTN–Qhubeka
- 2015–2016: Cult Energy Pro Cycling

Major wins
- Grand Tours Tour de France 1 individual stage (2007) Stage Races Deutschland Tour (2008) Bayern Rundfahrt (2009) Tour de Luxembourg (2011, 2015)

Linus Gerdemann (born 16 September 1982) is a German former professional road bicycle racer, who won a stage in the 2007 Tour de France and led the general classification for two days, wearing the yellow jersey.

After failing to find a contract for 2013, Gerdemann joined MTN–Qhubeka for the 2014 season. In 2015 he rode for Danish professional continental team Cult Energy-Vital Water. Early 2017, Gerdemann announced his retirement.

== Career ==
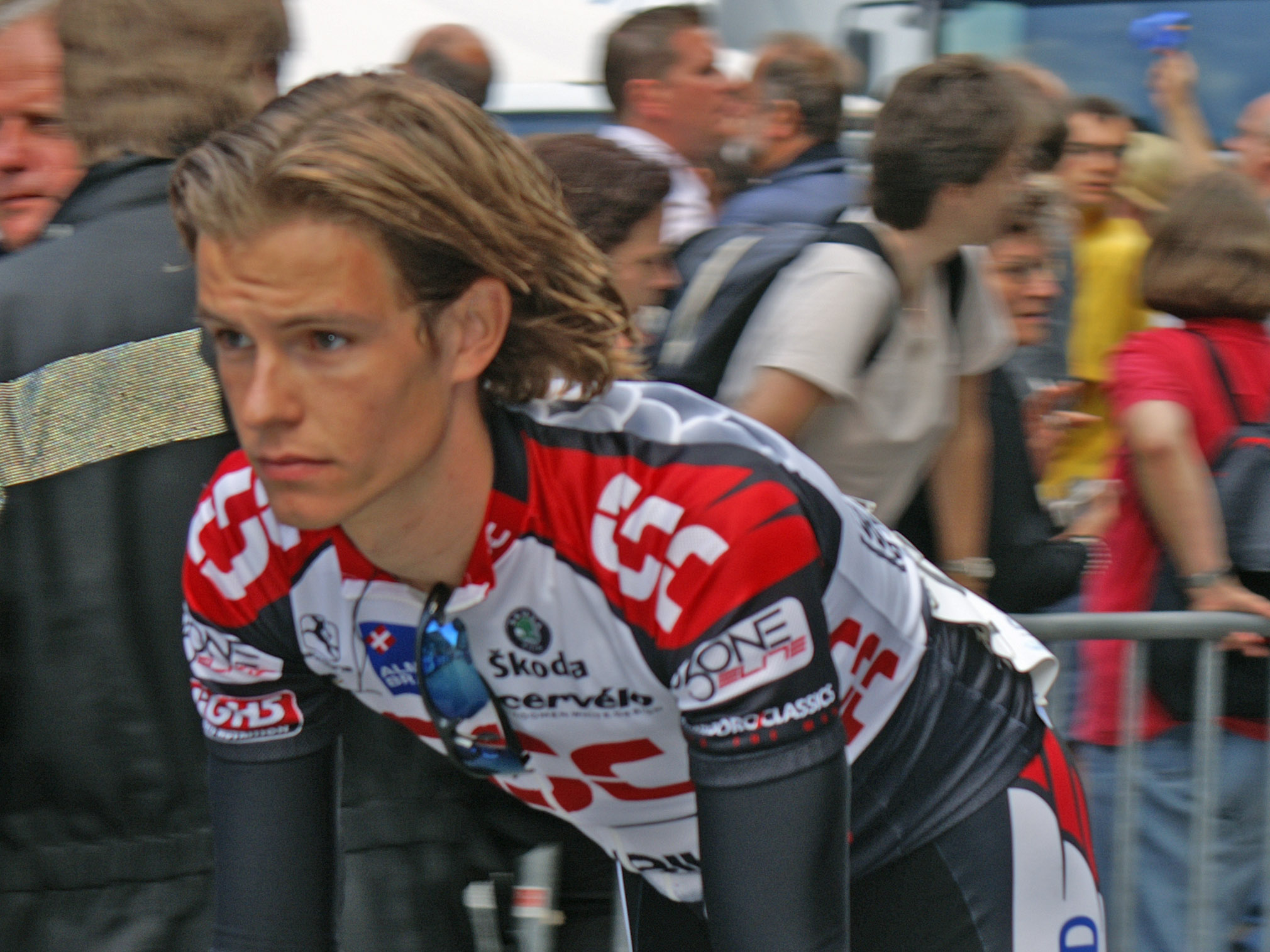
Gerdemann at the 2005 HEW Cyclassics

After riding on amateur teams Team Winfix and Team AKUD Arnolds Sicherheit, in 2005 he became a professional rider for Team CSC after a recommendation from Dennis Kraft, signing on for a 2-year contract. In his first year as a pro, he won the 7th stage of the UCI ProTour race Tour de Suisse and had the leader's jersey in Four Days of Dunkirk.

In late 2005 he agreed to a contract with rival UCI ProTour T-Mobile Team, starting from 2006. This got Team CSC owner Bjarne Riis to release Gerdemann from his contract at the end of 2005.

On Saturday 14 July 2007 he secured his biggest victory in his career, the seventh stage of the Tour de France from Bourg-en-Bresse to Le Grand-Bornand. The stage win gave him the yellow jersey as leader of the general classification, as well as the white jersey as leader of the young rider classification. He was also awarded the combativity award for this stage.

In March 2008 he sustained injuries from a crash in the Tirreno–Adriatico and was unable to race in the 2008 Tour de France or the Beijing summer Olympics. He came back from his injuries to win the Deutschland Tour in August 2008.

Gerdemann also won the Tour of Luxembourg in 2011 and 2015.

== Major results ==
2003
6th Overall Tour de Berlin
2004
National Under-23 Road Championships

1st Road race
3rd Time trial

1st Stage 4 Tour de Berlin
4th Memoriał Henryka Łasaka
6th Overall Thüringen Rundfahrt der U23
7th Rund um den Henninger Turm U23
2005
1st Stage 7 Tour de Suisse
2nd Overall Cinturón a Mallorca
3rd Overall Bayern Rundfahrt
5th Overall Four Days of Dunkirk
2006
6th Overall Volta a Catalunya
7th Overall Tour de Suisse
7th Grand Prix of Aargau Canton
8th Trofeo Calvià
2007
Tour de France

1st Stage 7
Held after Stages 7–8

6th Gran Premio di Lugano
9th Overall Vuelta a Andalucía
9th Milano–Torino
2008
1st Overall Deutschland Tour

1st Stage 1

1st Overall Tour de l'Ain

1st Stage 3a

1st Coppa Ugo Agostoni
3rd Monte Paschi Eroica
7th Overall Sachsen Tour
9th Gran Premio di Lugano
2009
1st Overall Bayern Rundfahrt
1st Großen Preis der Stadt Dessau-Roßlau
5th Monte Paschi Strade Bianche
7th Overall Tirreno–Adriatico
2010
1st Trofeo Inca
1st Stage 1 Tirreno–Adriatico
9th Overall Vuelta a Andalucía
2011
1st Overall Tour de Luxembourg

1st Stage 2

4th Overall Tour of Britain
10th Overall Eneco Tour
2012
2nd Road race, National Road Championships
5th Overall Tour de Pologne
8th Overall Vuelta a Castilla y León
2014
Tour d'Azerbaïdjan

1st Mountains classification
1st Stage 4

5th Overall La Tropicale Amissa Bongo
2015
1st Overall Tour de Luxembourg

1st Stage 2

4th Rund um Köln
5th Gran Premio di Lugano
8th Classica Corsica
2016
10th Overall Vuelta a Castilla y León
