= Thomas Löfkvist =

Swedish cyclist

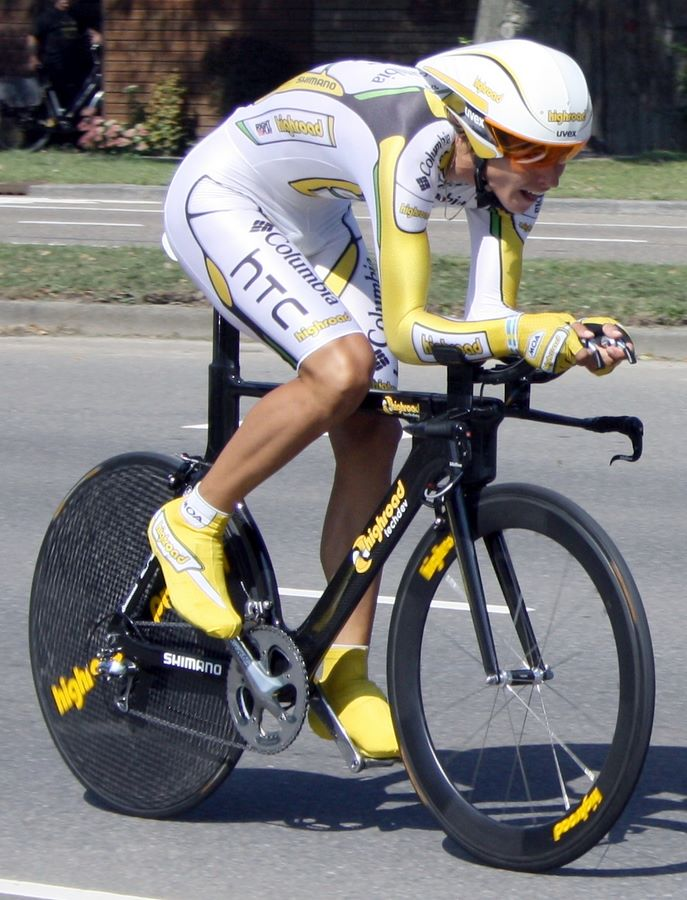
- Löfkvist at the 2009 Eneco Tour prologue

Personal information
- Full name: Karl Thomas Henry Löfkvist
- Nickname: Gotland
- Born: 4 April 1984 (age 42) Visby, Sweden
- Height: 1.86 m (6 ft 1 in)
- Weight: 70 kg (154 lb; 11 st 0 lb)

Cycling career
- Sport: Cycling
- Current team: Retired
- Discipline: Road
- Role: Rider
- Rider type: All-rounder

Professional teams
- 2004–2007: FDJeux.com
- 2008–2009: Team High Road
- 2010–2012: Team Sky
- 2013–2014: IAM Cycling

Major wins
- Grand Tours Giro d'Italia 1 TTT stage One-day races and Classics National Road Race Championships (2006) National Time Trial Championships (2004) Monte Paschi Strade Bianche (2009)

Thomas Löfkvist (born 4 April 1984) is a Swedish former professional road bicycle racer who last rode for the UCI Professional Continental team IAM Cycling. Since 2015 Thomas Löfkvist is general manager of Swedish professional cycling team Team Tre Berg–PostNord. He became the youngest Swedish professional road bicycle racer when he started his professional bicycling career in FDJeux.com at the age of 19 in 2004. Löfkvist was a good time trialist with solid climbing abilities, winning the Monte Paschi Eroica in 2009 with a powerful attack during the steep final kilometer ascent. He has previously used, both within and outside of the cycling world, the surname spelling 'Lövkvist'. Beginning with the cycling season of 2010 he is using his legal surname Löfkvist throughout.

== Career ==
=== Early years ===
As a junior, Löfkvist was the European mountain bike champion. Aged 19 he won the Individual Time Trial and the Overall Classification of the prestigious Circuit des Ardennes. Löfkvist also finished sixth and wore the leader's jersey in the 2003 Tour de l'Avenir. Following these results he turned professional for the French team FDJeux.com in 2004.

=== Française des Jeux ===
Löfkvist's first professional season turned out to be a very successful one. The week after turning 20 he won the last stage of Circuit de la Sarthe with a 171 km breakaway, covering 150 alone after getting rid of Christophe Moreau. The stage win also gave him the Overall Classification, drawing comparisons with Tour de France winners Bernard Hinault and Greg LeMond, who also won the race at the age of 20. Löfkvist finished 10 seconds ahead of Franck Bouyer, who four days later earned his revenge by beating Löfkvist in the French semi-classic Paris–Camembert. Later in the season he also won the Swedish National time trial championships and participated in the 2004 Summer Olympics. In the 2004 Tour de l'Avenir he won the last stage and finished second overall on the same time of the winner, Sylvain Calzati.

Löfkvist began the 2005 season with a 12th place in the Paris–Nice. He made his debut in the Tour de France as the youngest rider at the age of 21. He also finished 4th in the Tour de Pologne and 14th in the Deutschland Tour. He was later named the Swedish Cyclist of the Year. In 2006 he became the Swedish National Road Race champion and was once again the youngest rider of the Tour de France.

In 2007 he finished second in the Critérium International after winning the concluding Time Trial. He also competed in the Tour de France and later finished second in the 14th stage of the Vuelta a España, the best stage result for a Swede in Vuelta a España since 1982. At the age of 23 he had finished his second Grand Tour of the season and the fourth of his career. Löfkvist was the UCI ProTour rider with most competition days (84) in 2007 and he only abandoned in the last stage of Paris–Nice. He covered the third most competition kilometers in the ProTour.

=== Team Columbia ===
Löfkvist joined the Team High Road for the 2008 season, later known as Team Columbia. Löfkvist won the best young rider classification and finished third in the Tirreno–Adriatico. His improvement in stage races became clear after he finished fifth in the Tour de Suisse, ahead of his team leader Kim Kirchen. Löfkvist also took the white jersey from Romain Feillu in the first time trial of the 2008 Tour de France. Löfkvist then finished impressively 12th at the World Championships.

In 2009 he finished 5th at the Tour of California behind Levi Leipheimer and then won the Monte Paschi Eroica, his first win in two years. He also finished fourth in the Tirreno–Adriatico and later wore the pink jersey as leader of the general classification at the 2009 Giro d'Italia.

=== Team Sky ===
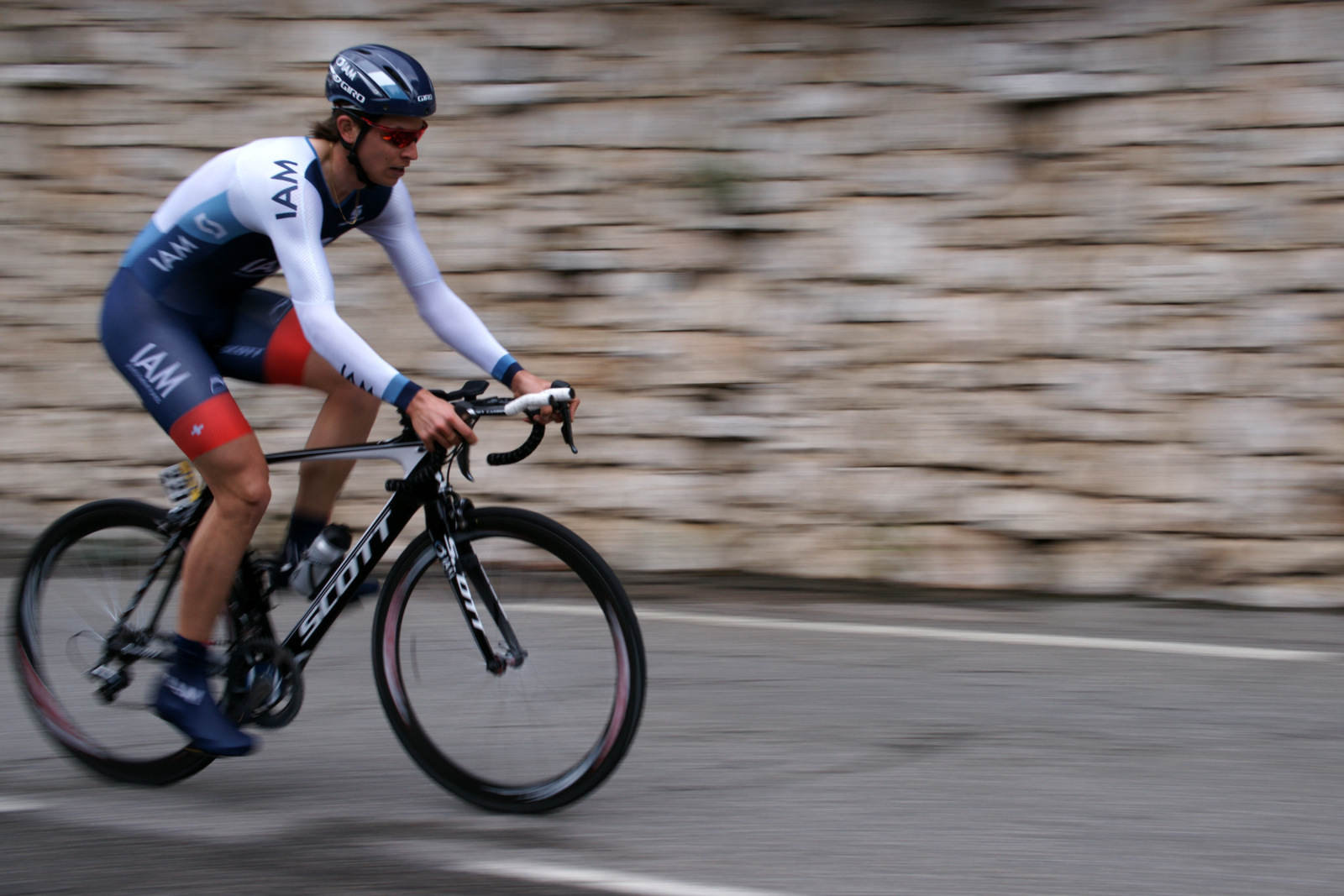
2013 Paris–Nice

On 10 September 2009, Löfkvist was presented as a rider for the newly established British Team Sky, where he has chosen to spell his name 'Löfkvist'. Team Sky officials have said that the name appears as 'Löfkvist' on the rider's passport, and he previously has used that spelling in the Olympic games.

In July 2010, Löfkvist finished 17th in the Tour de France (20 minutes, 46 seconds behind winner Alberto Contador), the highest placed Team Sky rider.

Löfkvist led Team Sky at the 2010 Vuelta a España, but the team withdrew from after Stage 7 following the death of soigneur Txema González.

In the absence of Bradley Wiggins, Löfkvist led Team Sky at the 2011 Giro d'Italia, where he finished 21st overall.

Löfkvist left Team Sky at the end of the 2012 season, and joined the new IAM Cycling team for the 2013 season.

In August 2014, Löfkvist announced his retirement at the end of the 2014 season, as he was diagnosed with chronic fatigue.

"My body is saying stop. I’ve enjoyed winning the Strade Bianche, but my most memorable moment is when I got the pink jersey at the Giro d’Italia in 2009. I’ve chosen my teams for their ethics and I’m proud of that."

— Thomas Löfkvist

In November 2014 Löfkvist was announced as general manager of the new Swedish squad Team Tre Berg-Bianchi ahead of the 2015 cycling season.

== Career achievements ==
=== Major results ===
2003
1st Overall Circuit des Ardennes
2004
1st Time trial, National Road Championships
1st Overall Circuit de la Sarthe

1st Stage 4

2nd Paris–Camembert
2nd Overall Tour de l'Avenir

1st Stage 10

2005
4th Overall Tour de Pologne
5th Overall Tour Méditerranéen
2006
1st Road race, National Road Championships
2007
1st Stage 3 (ITT) Critérium International
2008
2nd Overall Deutschland Tour

1st Points classification
1st Young rider classification

3rd Overall Tirreno–Adriatico
3rd Grand Prix of Aargau Canton
5th Coppa Bernocchi
5th Overall Tour de Suisse
8th Monte Paschi Eroica
9th Overall Volta a Catalunya
2009
1st Monte Paschi Strade Bianche
1st Stage 5 Sachsen Tour
Giro d'Italia

1st Stage 1 (TTT)
Held after Stage 4
Held after Stages 4–15

4th Overall Tirreno–Adriatico

1st Young rider classification

5th Overall Tour of California
6th La Flèche Wallonne
2010
2nd Montepaschi Strade Bianche
6th Overall Tour du Limousin
2011
6th Overall Vuelta a Andalucía
10th Overall Tirreno–Adriatico
2012
8th Overall Critérium International
2013
1st Overall Tour Méditerranéen
3rd Time trial, National Road Championships

=== Grand Tour general classification results timeline ===
| Grand Tour | 2005 | 2006 | 2007 | 2008 | 2009 | 2010 | 2011 | 2012 | 2013 | 2014 |
|---|---|---|---|---|---|---|---|---|---|---|
| Giro d'Italia | — | — | — | — | 25 | — | 21 | — | — | — |
| Tour de France | 61 | 63 | 64 | 41 | — | 17 | — | — | — | — |
| Vuelta a España | — | — | 54 | — | — | DNF | 52 | — | — | — |
