= 2010 Montepaschi Strade Bianche =

Race details
- Dates: 6 March
- Stages: 1
- Distance: 190 km (118.1 mi)
- Winning time: 4h 59' 48"

Results
	Winner	Maxim Iglinskiy (KAZ)	(Astana)
	Second	Thomas Löfkvist (SWE)	(Team Sky)
	Third	Michael Rogers (AUS)	(Team HTC–Columbia)

The 2010 Montepaschi Strade Bianche is a cycling race that took place on 6 March 2010. It was the 4th edition of the international classic Montepaschi Strade Bianche. The previous edition was won by Thomas Löfkvist, who rode for Team Columbia–High Road

== Results ==
	Cyclist	Team	Time
1	Maxim Iglinskiy (KAZ)	Astana	4h 59' 48"
2	Thomas Löfkvist (SWE)	Team Sky	+ 1"
3	Michael Rogers (AUS)	Team HTC–Columbia	s.t.
4	Filippo Pozzato (ITA)	Team Katusha	+ 18"
5	Ryder Hesjedal (CAN)	Garmin–Transitions	+ 19"
6	Francesco Ginanni (ITA)	Androni Giocattoli	+ 24"
7	Leonardo Bertagnolli (ITA)	Androni Giocattoli	+ 43"
8	Juan Antonio Flecha (ESP)	Team Sky	s.t.
9	Enrico Gasparotto (ITA)	Astana	+ 49"
10	Daniele Righi (ITA)	Lampre–Farnese Vini	s.t.
