= 2008 Monte Paschi Eroica =

2008 UCI Europe Tour
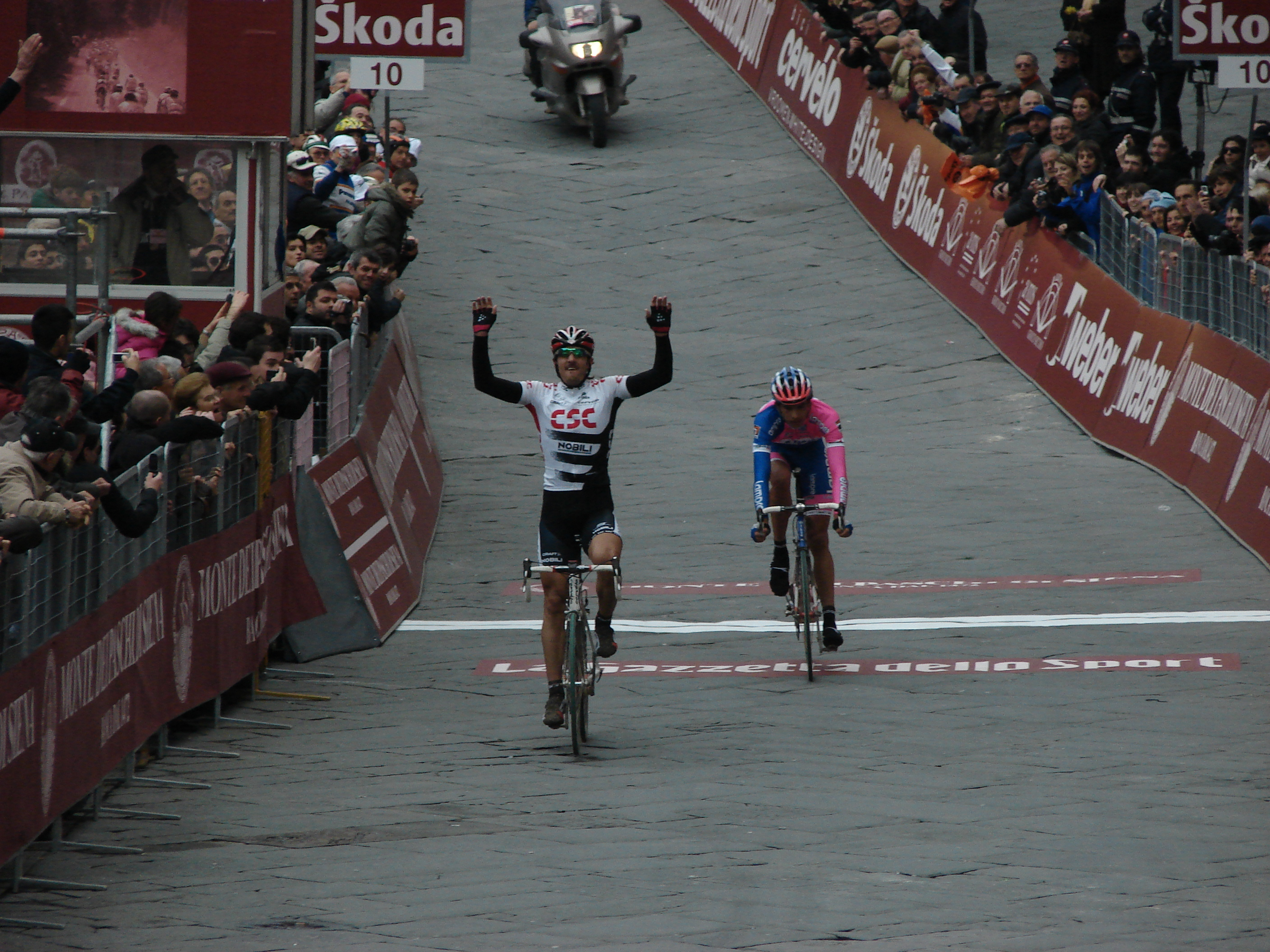
- Fabian Cancellara won the 2008 Monte Paschi Eroica

Race details
- Dates: 8 March 2008
- Stages: 1
- Distance: 181 km (112.5 mi)
- Winning time: 4h 34' 41"

Results
	Winner	Fabian Cancellara (SUI)	(Team CSC)
	Second	Alessandro Ballan (ITA)	(Lampre)
	Third	Linus Gerdemann (GER)	(Team High Road)

The 2008 Monte Paschi Eroica was the second edition of the Monte Paschi Eroica, later named Strade Bianche, held on 8 March 2008. It is a professional road bicycle race in Tuscany, Italy, starting in Gaiole in Chianti and finishing in Siena. The race was 181 km, including seven sectors of strade bianche, totaling 56,1 km of gravel road.

Swiss rider Fabian Cancellara won the race in a two-man sprint with Alessandro Ballan. The duo had caught early Canadian escapee Ryder Hesjedal at nine kilometer from the finish and headed into Siena's Piazza del Campo, where Cancellara took the win after hitting the front with 150 metres to go. 63 riders finished.

== Results ==
Race result
Rank	Rider	Team	Time
1	Fabian Cancellara (SUI)	Team CSC	4h 34' 41"
2	Alessandro Ballan (ITA)	Lampre	+ 0"
3	Linus Gerdemann (GER)	Team High Road	+ 15"
4	Martijn Maaskant (NED)	Slipstream–Chipotle	+ 15"
5	Baden Cooke (AUS)	Barloworld	+ 15"
6	Patrick Calcagni (SUI)	Barloworld	+ 15"
7	Niklas Axelsson (SWE)	Diquigiovanni–Androni	+ 15"
8	Thomas Lövkvist (SWE)	Team High Road	+ 15"
9	Pavel Brutt (RUS)	Tinkoff Credit Systems	+ 38"
10	Ryder Hesjedal (CAN)	Slipstream–Chipotle	+ 38"
