= Strade Bianche =

Italian one-day road cycling race

- 2026 Strade Bianche

Race details
- Date: Early March
- Region: Tuscany, Italy
- Nickname: Europe's southernmost northern classic
- Discipline: Road
- Competition: UCI World Tour
- Type: Single-day
- Organiser: RCS Sport
- Race director: Mauro Vegni
- Web site: www.strade-bianche.it

History
- First edition: 2007
- Editions: 20 (as of 2026)
- First winner: Alexandr Kolobnev (RUS)
- Most wins: Tadej Pogačar (SLO) (4 wins)
- Most recent: Tadej Pogačar (SLO)

The Strade Bianche (pronounced [ˈstraːde ˈbjaŋke]; Italian for 'White Roads') is a road bicycle race in Tuscany, Central Italy, starting and finishing in Siena. First held in 2007, it is raced annually on the first or second Saturday of March. The name stems from the historic white gravel roads in the Crete Senesi, which are a defining feature of the race. Around one-third of the total race distance is raced on dirt roads, covering between around 60 km (37 mi) and 80 km (50 mi) of strade bianche, spread over multiple sectors.

Despite its short history, the Strade Bianche has quickly gained prestige, and renewed interest in road racing on gravel and dirt roads as a specific skill and discipline. The event is part of the UCI World Tour, cycling's highest level of professional road races. It is organized by RCS Sport – La Gazzetta dello Sport, and is held the weekend before Tirreno–Adriatico as an early spring precursor to the cobbled classics in April. A three-time winner over the pavé of Paris–Roubaix and the cobbled hills of the Tour of Flanders, Swiss rider Fabian Cancellara rejected comparisons between the races, believing the "white roads" of the Strade "deserved appreciation in their own right". Thibaut Pinot described it as "the sixth Monument" of Classic road cycling because of its unique parcours, difficulty and prestige. Tadej Pogačar has won the most editions of the race, winning four times in 2022 and 2024–2026.

Since 2015, there has been a women's race, the Strade Bianche Donne, part of the UCI Women's World Tour. It is held on the same day as the men's race, on the same roads but at a shorter distance. Both events start and finish in Siena.

== History ==
=== Monte Paschi Eroica ===
L'Eroica Strade Bianche ("Heroic race of the white roads") was created in 1997 as a granfondo (recreational bike race) for vintage bikes only, on the white gravel roads around Siena, an event that is still held on the day after the professional race. The concept was to recreate cycling's so-called "heroic era" from the first half of the 20th century, when most bike races were ridden on dirt or unpaved roads.

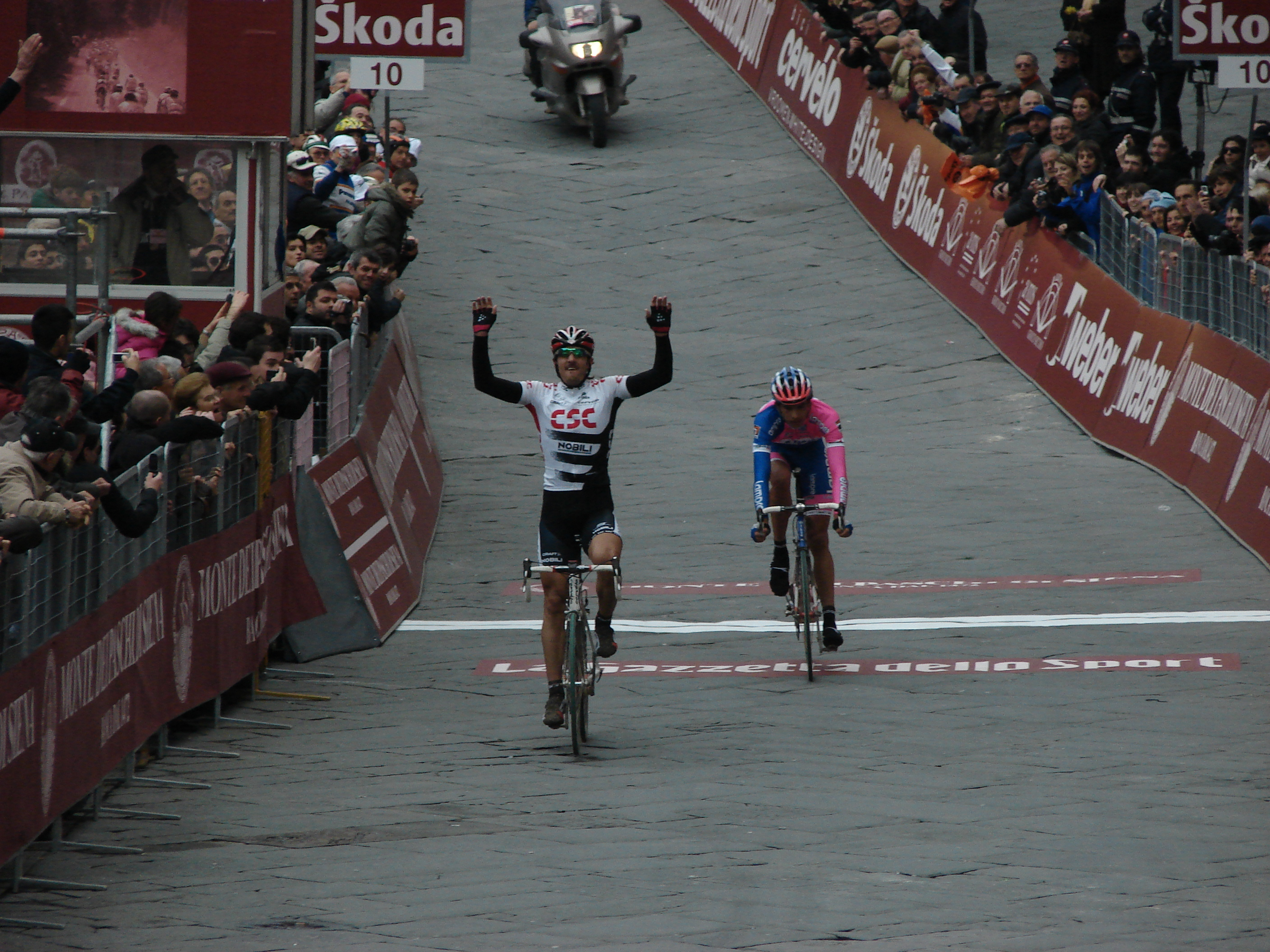
Fabian Cancellara won the 2008 Monte Paschi Eroica in a two-man sprint with Alessandro Ballan in Siena.

In 2007, a professional race was spun off the event, inaugurally called Monte Paschi Eroica, won by Russian Alexandr Kolobnev. The race was held on 9 October; it started in Gaiole in Chianti and finished in Siena. Organizer RCS asked local cycling icons Fiorenzo Magni and Paolo Bettini to promote the maiden event. Monte dei Paschi, the world's oldest still-existing bank with its headquarters in Siena, served as the race's title sponsor for the first four years.

In 2008 it moved to early March on the calendar, closer to the heart of the spring classics season. Swiss Fabian Cancellara won the second edition. In 2009, organizers changed the name of the race to Strade Bianche – Eroica Toscana and in 2010 to Strade Bianche. The race was also lengthened 9 km (5.6 mi) and one more gravel sector was added, taking the total unsealed sections to 57 km (35 mi).

=== Strade Bianche ===
In 2014, the start of the race moved to the hilly town of San Gimignano. In 2015, its name officially changed to Strade Bianche – Eroica Pro after the creation of a women's version, and UCI upgraded the event to a 1.HC race of the UCI Europe Tour, the highest rating for a non-World Tour single-day cycling event. Since 2016, Siena has hosted both the start and finish of the Strade Bianche. Due to the nature of the race and its place on the calendar, the field is usually made up of riders taking part in Tirreno–Adriatico and Milan–San Remo.

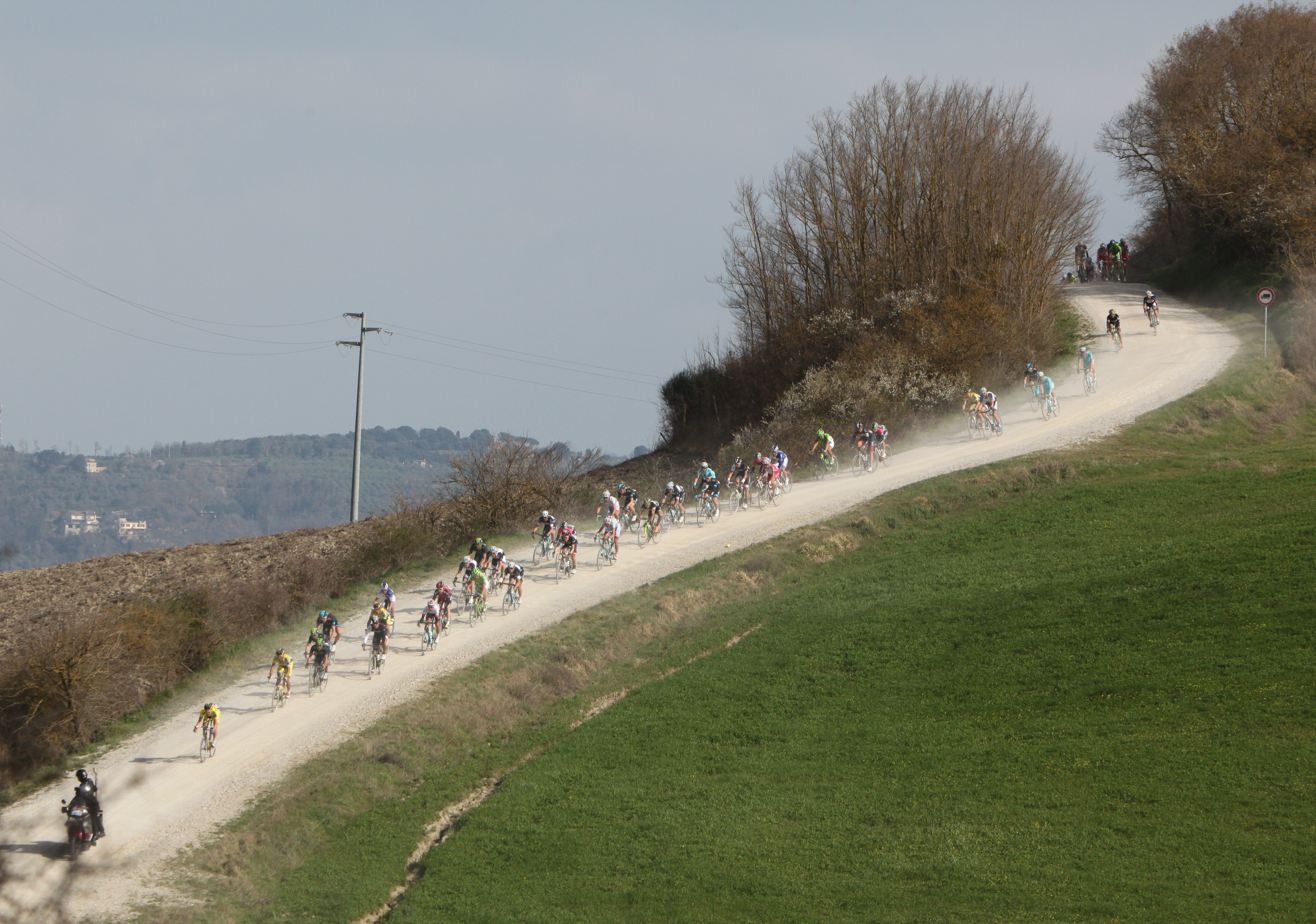
The peloton during the 2014 event, won by Michał Kwiatkowski.

Although a young event, the race gained the status of an "instant classic", garnering much media attention and soon becoming a desirable entry in classics riders' palmares. Among the winners of the first ten editions feature Fabian Cancellara, Philippe Gilbert, and Michał Kwiatkowski on a very international roll of honour. Moreno Moser became the first Italian winner of the Strade Bianche in the 2013 race. Classics specialist Cancellara won the tenth edition in 2016, becoming the first three-time winner of the race and earning a gravel sector named after him.

=== World Tour race ===
In 2017, the Strade Bianche was included in the UCI World Tour, cycling's highest level of professional races. Michał Kwiatkowski claimed his second victory, becoming the second rider with more than one win.

The 2018 event was raced in abysmal weather. Low temperatures and heavy rainfall had made the gravel roads exceptionally muddy and decimated the peloton in the early stages of the race. Belgian Tiesj Benoot claimed his first professional victory, after he bridged a gap to the race leaders and left them behind on the penultimate gravel sector of Colle Pinzuto. Only 53 of 147 participants finished the race; 20 riders arrived outside of the time limit. Second-place finisher Romain Bardet called the event a "Dante-esque contest".

The 2020 event was postponed to August 1 from its usual March schedule due to the COVID-19 pandemic.

By the mid 2020s, media and riders discussed the possibility of the race being elevated to a "cycling monument" in future, with Cycling News stating in 2025 that "there is no longer any debate that Strade Bianche is cycling's sixth Monument".

Tadej Pogačar took his first win at Strade Bianche in 2022. Tom Pidcock prevailed in 2023 before Pogačar claimed a second win in 2024. In 2025, the pair found themselves at the front of the race when reigning World Champion Pogačar misjudged a corner and crashed. Pidcock slowed to wait for Pogačar, who would later ride away to a solo victory, becoming the second rider after Fabian Cancellara to win the race three times. In 2026, the race celebrated its 20th edition. The route was shortened slightly with a reduction in the distance of gravel roads. The race was won by Pogačar for a record fourth time.

== Route ==
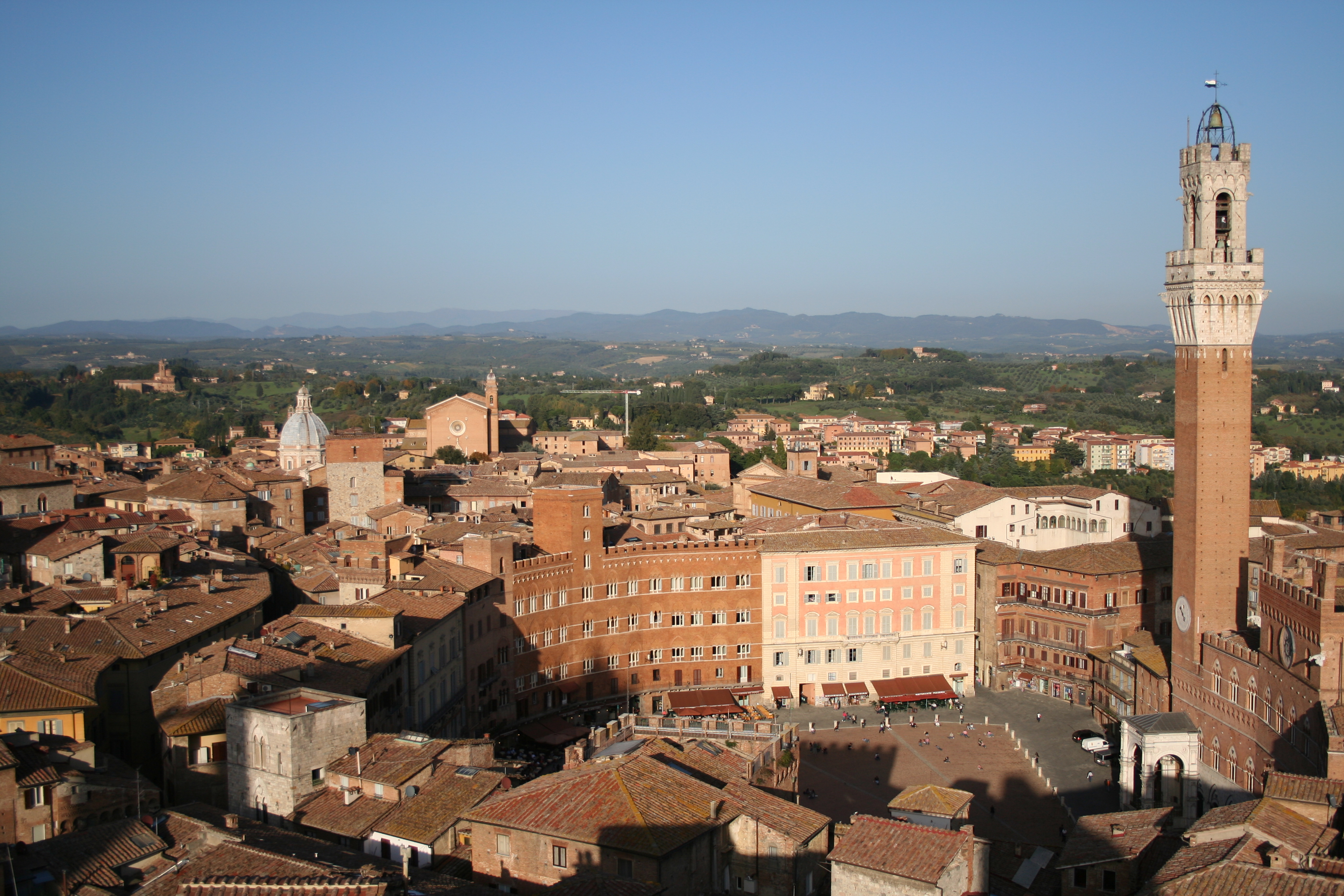
The Piazza del Campo in Siena hosts the finish of the Strade Bianche.

=== Course ===
The race starts and finishes in the UNESCO World Heritage Site of Siena. The route is around 180–200 km (110–120 mi) in length over hilly terrain crossing the Crete Senesi in the central Tuscan province of Siena. The route is characterized by the presence of white gravel roads; unpaved country lanes winding through the hills and vineyards of the Chianti region. There are sectors of gravel in varying lengths and difficulty, with the 2025 edition of the race featuring 81.7 kilometres (50.8 mi) of dirt roads. Additional gravel sectors have been added to the route over time, rising from 52 km (32 mi) of gravel in 2016 to over 80 km (50 mi) of gravel in 2025. The finish is on Siena's Piazza del Campo, after a steep and narrow climb on the roughly-paved Via Santa Caterina leading into the center of the medieval city.

=== Gravel roads ===
The white gravel roads, characteristic of the Tuscan countryside, provide the unique character of the race. They are usually country lanes and farm tracks, called strade bianche or sterrati in Italian, twisting through the hills and vineyards of the Chianti region. The longest and most arduous sectors are the ones in Lucignano d'Asso (9.5 km, 5.9 mi) and Asciano (11 km, 6.8 mi). Some of the dirt roads are flat; other sections include steep climbs and winding descents, testing riders' climbing abilities and bike handling skills. Positioning and route knowledge often prove vital. Additional gravel sectors have been added to the route over time, rising from 52 km (32 mi) of gravel in 2016 to 81.7 km (50.8 mi) of gravel in 2025.

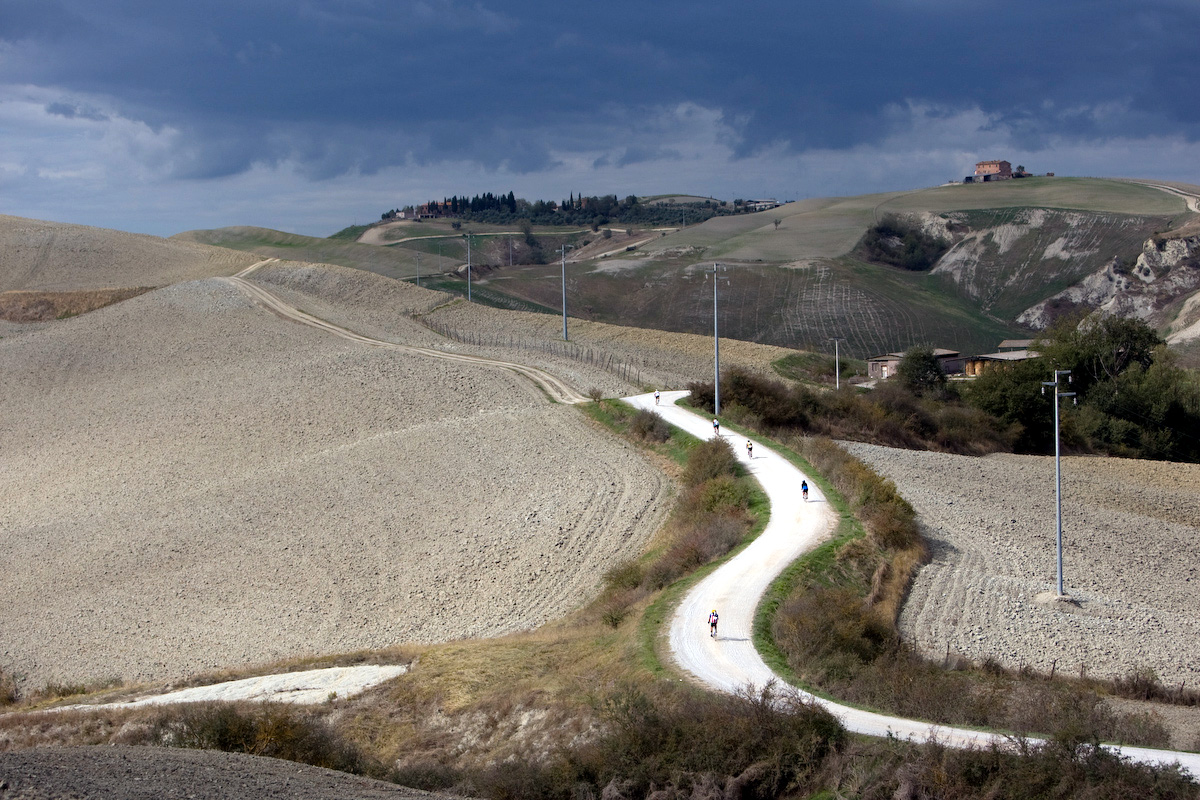
One of the strade bianche in the Crete Senesi, south of Siena, pictured during the "Eroica" granfondo in 2008

Race organizers were inspired by the two most famous northern classics, uniting the peculiarities of the Tour of Flanders with its bergs (short stretches of steep hills), and Paris–Roubaix with its gruelling cobblestone sections. It has been called Italy's answer to Flanders' famous one-day races, as reflected by the promotional slogan of the 2015 edition: La Classica del Nord più a sud d'Europa (Europe's most southern Northern Classic).

Angelo Zomegnan, RCS events director, explained before the first edition in 2007: "Cycling needed something new and the riders need a motivation [...] This race is unique and special." Likewise, Italian sprinter Daniele Bennati was equally enthusiastic about the race, stating: "It was a sensation of turning back in time. I did not think paths like these, where you only see a tractor every now and then, still existed [...] It will be an important race that could become an important classic. I can already imagine the atmosphere of the arrival in the Piazza del Palio."

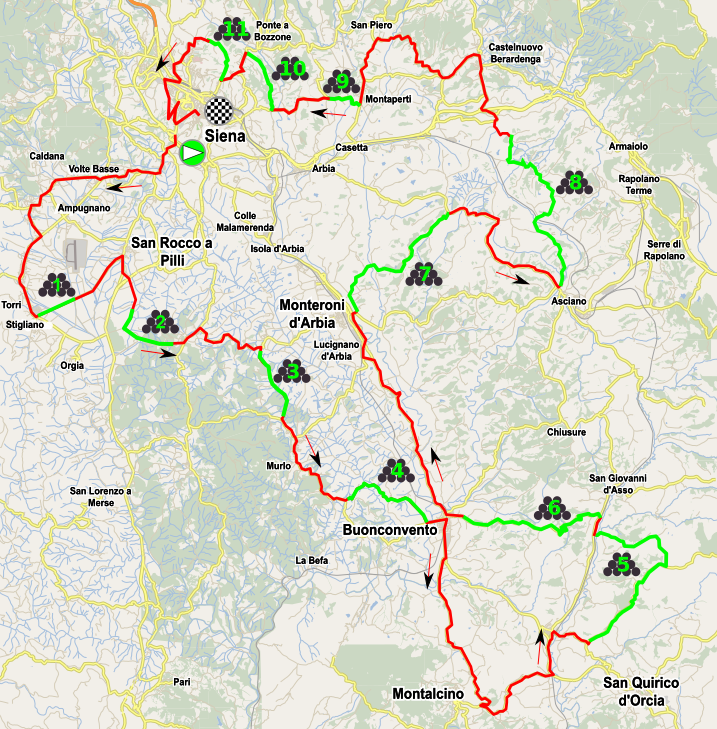
Starting and finishing in Siena, the race runs entirely in the province of Siena in central Tuscany. Gravel sectors are in green.

Sectors of strade bianche in the 2019 event
No.	Name	Distance from		Length (km)	Category
No.	Name	Start (km)	Finish (km)	Length (km)	Category
1	Vidritta	17.6	160.3	2.1	*
2	Bagnaia	25	153.2	4.7	*
3	Radi	36.9	142.7	4.4	*
4	La piana	47.6	130.9	5.5	*
5	Lucignano d'Asso	75.8	96.3	11.9	*
6	Pieve a Salti	88.7	87.3	8.0	*
7	San Martino in Grania	111.3	63.2	9.5	*
8	Monte Sante Marie (Settore Cancellara)	130	42.5	11.5	*
9	Monteaperti	160	23.6	0.8	*
10	Colle Pinzuto	164.6	17	2.4	*
11	Le Tolfe	171	11.9	1.1	*

== Winners ==
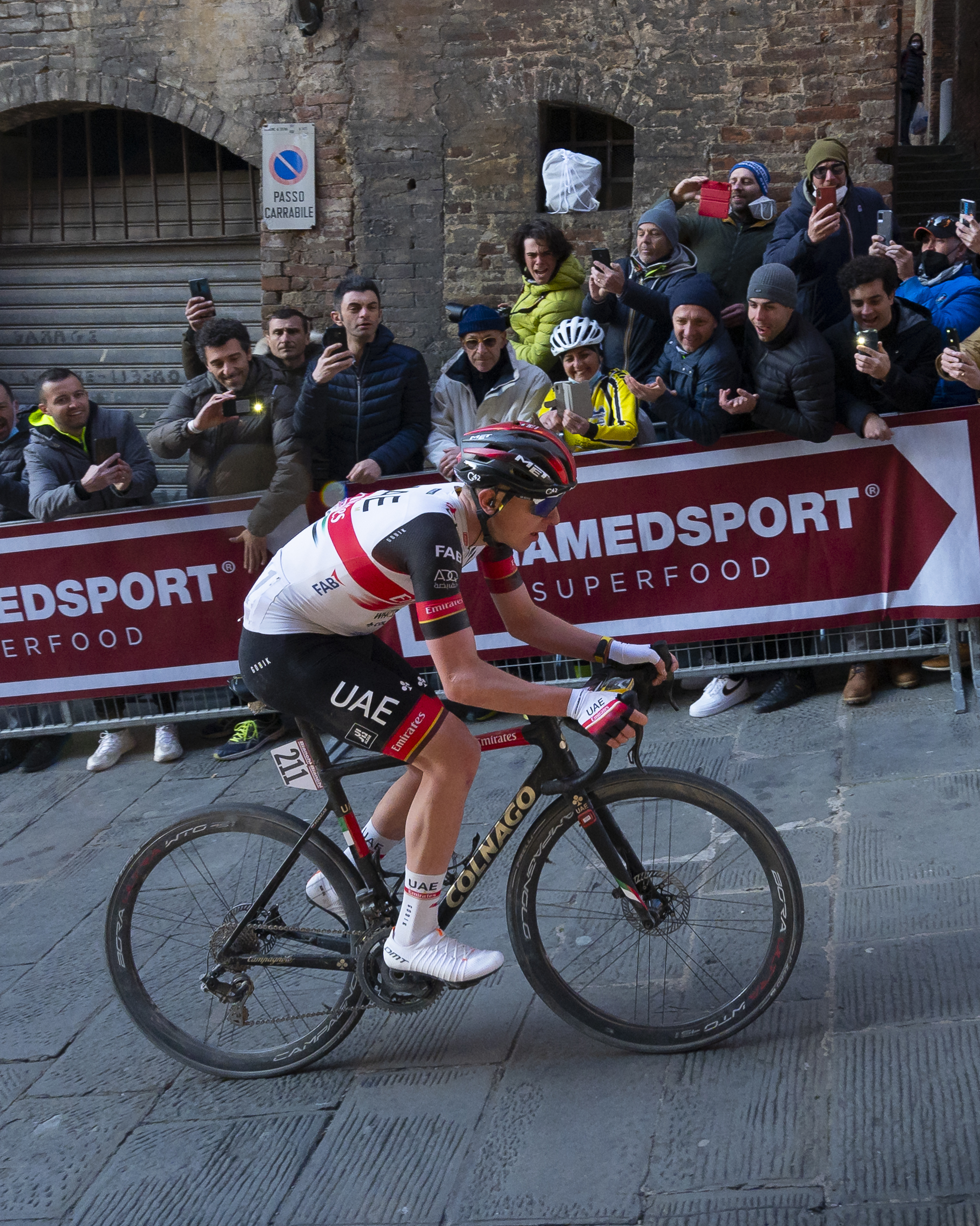
Tadej Pogačar (pictured at the 2022 edition) has won the race four times

Year	Country	Rider	Team
2007	Russia	Alexandr Kolobnev	Team CSC
2008	Switzerland	Fabian Cancellara	Team CSC
2009	Sweden	Thomas Löfkvist	Team Columbia–High Road
2010	Kazakhstan	Maxim Iglinsky	Astana
2011	Belgium	Philippe Gilbert	Omega Pharma–Lotto
2012	Switzerland	Fabian Cancellara	RadioShack–Nissan
2013	Italy	Moreno Moser	Cannondale
2014	Poland	Michał Kwiatkowski	Omega Pharma–Quick-Step
2015	Czech Republic	Zdeněk Štybar	Etixx–Quick-Step
2016	Switzerland	Fabian Cancellara	Trek–Segafredo
2017	Poland	Michał Kwiatkowski	Team Sky
2018	Belgium	Tiesj Benoot	Lotto–Soudal
2019	France	Julian Alaphilippe	Deceuninck–Quick-Step
2020	Belgium	Wout Van Aert	Team Jumbo–Visma
2021	Netherlands	Mathieu van der Poel	Alpecin–Fenix
2022	Slovenia	Tadej Pogačar	UAE Team Emirates
2023	United Kingdom	Tom Pidcock	INEOS Grenadiers
2024	Slovenia	Tadej Pogačar	UAE Team Emirates
2025	Slovenia	Tadej Pogačar	UAE Team Emirates XRG
2026	Slovenia	Tadej Pogačar	UAE Team Emirates XRG

=== Multiple winners ===
Wins	Rider	Editions
4	Tadej Pogačar (SLO)	2022, 2024, 2025, 2026
3	Fabian Cancellara (SUI)	2008, 2012, 2016
2	Michał Kwiatkowski (POL)	2014, 2017

=== Wins per country ===
Wins	Country
4	Slovenia
3	Belgium; Switzerland
2	Poland
1	Czech Republic; France; Great Britain; Italy; Kazakhstan; Netherlands; Russia; Sweden

== Trivia ==
- Riders who take three Strade Bianche titles have a sector of gravel road named after them. Fabian Cancellara was the first rider to have a sector named in his honour: an 11.5 km (7.1 mi) sector in Monte Sante Marie following three wins in 2008, 2012 and 2016. Tadej Pogačar was the second rider to have a sector named in their honour: a 2.4 km (1.5 mi) sector in Colle Pinzuto following three wins in 2022, 2024 and 2025.
- The youngest winner was Moreno Moser in 2013 (22 years and 70 days).
- The oldest winner was Fabian Cancellara in 2016 (34 years and 353 days).
- Three riders – Alessandro Ballan, Peter Sagan and Greg Van Avermaet – finished second on two occasions. None of them have ever won the race.

== Strade Bianche Donne ==
A women's race, the Strade Bianche Donne, was inaugurated in 2015. Part of the UCI Women's World Tour, it is held on the same day as the men's race, on the same roads but at a shorter distance. The women's race is run over around 135 km (84 mi), containing 50 km (31 mi) of gravel roads spread over eight sectors. American Megan Guarnier won the inaugural event in 2015, with Dutch riders Annemiek van Vleuten, and Demi Vollering, and Belgian rider Lotte Kopecky having won two editions of the race.
