= L'Eroica =

Cycling event in Siena, Italy

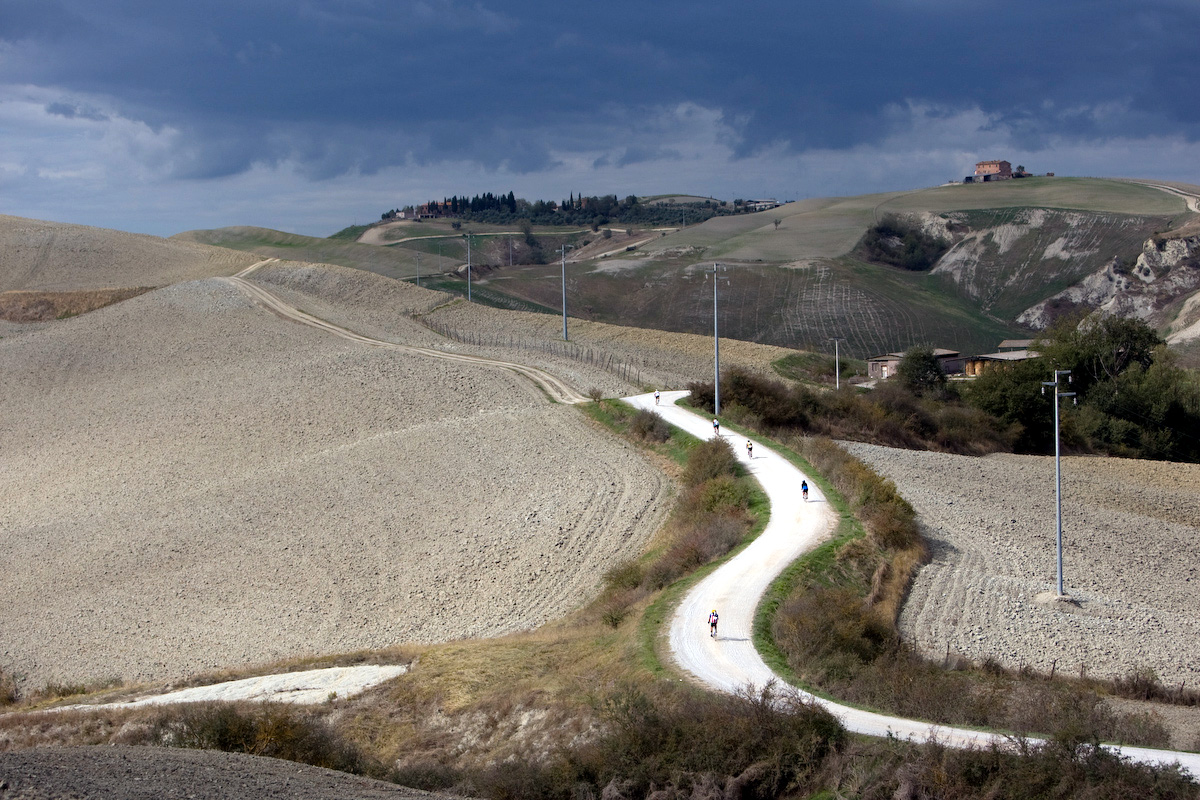
A part of the route

L'Eroica is an annual non-competitive cycling event which has taken place since 1997 in the province of Siena, Italy. The theme of the event is vintage cycling, with participants using vintage bikes (up to and including 1987), accessories and clothing, and the route often including unpaved roads. It is held in the first Sunday of October. The event is open to everybody, but cyclists participating with a vintage bike are honored with a certificate certifying their participation. Vintage bikes are defined by characteristics typical of racing bikes used until the 1980s. These include:

- steel frame
- gear levers mounted on the down tube of the frame
- external wires
- pedals with toe straps
- wheels with at least 32 spokes and low-profile rims

== See also ==
- Strade Bianche, the professional cycle race that grew out of L'Eroica
