= 2008 Tour Down Under =

10th edition of the Tour Down Under road cycling stage race

2008 UCI ProTour, race 1 of 15

Race details
- Dates: 22 –27 January 2008
- Stages: 6
- Distance: 835 km (519 mi)
- Winning time: 18h 46' 18"

Results
	Winner	André Greipel (GER)	(Team High Road)
	Second	Allan Davis (AUS)	(UniSA–Australia)
	Third	José Joaquín Rojas (ESP)	(Caisse d'Epargne)
	Points	André Greipel (GER)	(Team High Road)
	Mountains	Philippe Gilbert (BEL)	(Française des Jeux)
	Young rider	José Joaquín Rojas (ESP)	(Caisse d'Epargne)
	Team	Française des Jeux	

The 2008 Tour Down Under was the 10th edition of the Tour Down Under road cycling stage race, taking place from 22 to 27 January in and around Adelaide, South Australia. The Tour Down Under was the first race outside of Europe to be given ProTour status by the UCI.

The race was preceded by an opening race called Down Under Classic, not part of the UCI ProTour competition. It was won by German André Greipel of Team High Road.

== Teams ==
Eighteen UCI ProTour teams and the Australian national team participated in the race.

- Ag2r–La Mondiale
- Astana
- Bouygues Télécom
- Cofidis
- Crédit Agricole
- Team CSC
- Euskaltel–Euskadi
- Française des Jeux
- Caisse d'Epargne
- Gerolsteiner
- Lampre
- Liquigas
- Team Milram
- Quick-Step
- Rabobank
- Saunier Duval–Scott
- Silence–Lotto
- Team High Road
- UniSA–Australia

== Stage results ==
=== Stage 1, 22 January, Mawson Lakes–Angaston, 129 km ===
Stage 1 result

	Cyclist	Team	Time	UCI ProTour Points
1	Mark Renshaw (AUS)	Crédit Agricole	3h 13' 33"	3 pts
2	José Joaquín Rojas (ESP)	Caisse d'Epargne	s.t.	2 pts
3	Graeme Brown (AUS)	Rabobank	s.t.	1 pt

General Classification after Stage 1

	Cyclist	Team	Time
1	Mark Renshaw (AUS)	Crédit Agricole	3h 13' 23"
2	José Joaquín Rojas (ESP)	Caisse d'Epargne	+ 4"
3	Mickaël Buffaz (FRA)	Cofidis	+ 4"

=== Stage 2, 23 January, Stirling – Hahndorf, 148 km ===
Stage 2 result

	Cyclist	Team	Time	UCI ProTour Points
1	André Greipel (GER)	Team High Road	3h 46' 55"	3 pts
2	Graeme Brown (AUS)	Rabobank	s.t.	2 pts
3	Allan Davis (AUS)	Team UniSA–Australia	s.t.	-

General Classification after Stage 2

	Cyclist	Team	Time
1	Graeme Brown (AUS)	Rabobank	7h 00' 18"
2	Mark Renshaw (AUS)	Crédit Agricole	s.t.
3	André Greipel (GER)	Team High Road	s.t.

=== Stage 3, 24 January, Unley – Victor Harbor, 139 km ===
Stage 3 result

	Cyclist	Team	Time	UCI ProTour Points
1	Allan Davis (AUS)	Team UniSA–Australia	3h 13' 48"	-
2	Mark Renshaw (AUS)	Crédit Agricole	s.t.	2 pts
3	Mathew Hayman (AUS)	Rabobank	s.t.	1 pt

General Classification after Stage 3

	Cyclist	Team	Time
1	Mark Renshaw (AUS)	Crédit Agricole	10h 14' 00"
2	Allan Davis (AUS)	Team UniSA–Australia	+ 2"
3	André Greipel (GER)	Team High Road	+ 6"

=== Stage 4, 25 January, Mannum – Strathalbyn, 134 km ===
Stage 4 result

	Cyclist	Team	Time	UCI ProTour Points
1	André Greipel (GER)	Team High Road	3h 14' 46"	3 pts
2	Mark Renshaw (AUS)	Crédit Agricole	s.t.	2 pts
3	José Joaquín Rojas (ESP)	Caisse d'Epargne	s.t.	1 pt

General Classification after Stage 4

	Cyclist	Team	Time
1	Mark Renshaw (AUS)	Crédit Agricole	13h 28' 38"
2	André Greipel (GER)	Team High Road	+ 4"
3	Allan Davis (AUS)	Team UniSA–Australia	+ 7"

=== Stage 5, 26 January, Willunga – Willunga, 147 km ===
Stage 5 result

	Cyclist	Team	Time	UCI ProTour Points
1	André Greipel (GER)	Team High Road	3h 26' 26"	3 pts
2	Allan Davis (AUS)	Team UniSA–Australia	s.t.	-
3	José Alberto Benítez (ESP)	Saunier Duval–Scott	s.t.	1 pt

General Classification after Stage 5

	Cyclist	Team	Time
1	André Greipel (GER)	Team High Road	16h 55' 18"
2	Allan Davis (AUS)	Team UniSA–Australia	+ 7"
3	José Joaquín Rojas (ESP)	Caisse d'Epargne	+ 20"

=== Stage 6, 27 January, Adelaide East End Circuit, 88 km ===
Stage 6 result

	Cyclist	Team	Time	UCI ProTour Points
1	André Greipel (GER)	Team High Road	1h 51' 13"	3 pts
2	Robert Förster (GER)	Gerolsteiner	s.t.	2 pts
3	Graeme Brown (AUS)	Rabobank	s.t.	1 pt

General Classification after Stage 6

	Cyclist	Team	Time
1	André Greipel (GER)	Team High Road	18h 46' 18"
2	Allan Davis (AUS)	Team UniSA–Australia	+ 15"
3	José Joaquín Rojas (ESP)	Caisse d'Epargne	+ 33"

== Final standing ==
=== General classification ===
	Cyclist	Team	Time	UCI ProTour Points
1	André Greipel (GER)	Team High Road	18h 46' 18"	50
2	Allan Davis (AUS)	Team UniSA–Australia	+ 15"	-
3	José Joaquín Rojas (ESP)	Caisse d'Epargne	+ 33"	35
4	Mickaël Delage (FRA)	Française des Jeux	+ 37"	30
5	Mickaël Buffaz (FRA)	Cofidis	+ 37"	25
6	José Alberto Benítez (ESP)	Saunier Duval–Scott	+ 39"	20
7	Kjell Carlström (FIN)	Liquigas	+ 39"	15
8	Luis León Sánchez (ESP)	Caisse d'Epargne	+ 41"	10
9	Richie Porte (AUS)	Team UniSA–Australia	+ 41"	-
10	Stuart O'Grady (AUS)	Team CSC	+ 42"	2

=== Mountains classification ===
	Cyclist	Team	Points
1	Philippe Gilbert (BEL)	Française des Jeux	38
2	David Moncoutié (FRA)	Cofidis	22
3	Mathieu Perget (FRA)	Caisse d'Epargne	18

=== Points classification ===
	Cyclist	Team	Points
1	André Greipel (GER)	Team High Road	38
2	Allan Davis (AUS)	Team UniSA–Australia	34
3	Mark Renshaw (AUS)	Crédit Agricole	24

=== Young classification ===
	Cyclist	Team	Time
1	José Joaquín Rojas (ESP)	Caisse d'Epargne	18h 46' 51"
2	Mickaël Delage (FRA)	Française des Jeux	+ 4"
3	Richie Porte (AUS)	Team UniSA–Australia	+ 8"

=== Team classification ===
	Team	Country	Time
1	Française des Jeux	France	56h 21' 03"
2	Saunier Duval–Scott	Spain	s.t.
3	Caisse d'Epargne	Spain	s.t.

== Classification leadership ==
Stage (Winner)	General Classification	Mountains Classification	Points Classification	Young rider classification	Team Classification
Stage 1 (Mark Renshaw)	Mark Renshaw	Philippe Gilbert	Mickaël Buffaz	José Joaquín Rojas	Ag2r–La Mondiale
Stage 2 (André Greipel)	Graeme Brown	Philippe Gilbert	Mickaël Buffaz	José Joaquín Rojas	Astana
Stage 3 (Allan Davis)	Mark Renshaw	Philippe Gilbert	Mark Renshaw	José Joaquín Rojas	Team High Road
Stage 4 (André Greipel)	Mark Renshaw	Philippe Gilbert	Mark Renshaw	José Joaquín Rojas	Team CSC
Stage 5 (André Greipel)	André Greipel	Philippe Gilbert	André Greipel	José Joaquín Rojas	Française des Jeux
Stage 6 (André Greipel)	André Greipel	Philippe Gilbert	André Greipel	José Joaquín Rojas	Française des Jeux
Final	André Greipel	Philippe Gilbert	André Greipel	José Joaquín Rojas	Française des Jeux

== Individual 2008 UCI ProTour standings after race ==
As of 27 January 2008, after the Tour Down Under

After winning 4 stages of Tour Down Under and the overall classification, German André Greipel is the first leader of 2008 UCI ProTour.

Rank	Previous Rank	Name	Team	Points
1	-	André Greipel (GER)	Team High Road	62
2	-	José Joaquín Rojas (ESP)	Caisse d'Epargne	38
3	-	Mickaël Delage (FRA)	Française des Jeux	30
4	-	Mickaël Buffaz (FRA)	Rabobank	25
5	-	José Alberto Benítez (ESP)	Saunier Duval–Scott	21
6	-	Kjell Carlström (FIN)	Liquigas	15
7	-	Luis León Sánchez (ESP)	Caisse d'Epargne	10
8	-	Mark Renshaw (AUS)	Crédit Agricole	7
9	-	Graeme Brown (AUS)	Rabobank	4
10	-	Stuart O'Grady (AUS)	Team CSC	2
11	-	Robert Förster (GER)	Gerolsteiner	2
12	-	Mathew Hayman (AUS)	Rabobank	1
