= 2008 Tour de Pologne =

Cycling race

2008 Tour of Poland
2008 UCI ProTour, race 15 of 15

Race details
- Dates: 14 to 20 September
- Stages: 7
- Winning time: 26h 27' 07"

Results
Jersey awarded to the overall winner	Winner	Jens Voigt (GER)	(CSC–Saxo Bank)
	Second	Lars Bak (DEN)	(CSC–Saxo Bank)
	Third	Franco Pellizotti (ITA)	(Liquigas)
Jersey awarded to the points classification winner	Points	Allan Davis (AUS)	(Quick-Step)
Jersey awarded to the mountains classification winner	Mountains	Jens Voigt (GER)	(CSC–Saxo Bank)
Jersey awarded to the sprints classification winner	Sprints	Marcin Sapa (POL)	(Polish national team)

The 2008 Tour of Poland cycling road race took place from 14 to 20 September 2008.

== Stages ==
=== Stage 1 ===
14 September 2008 — Warsaw – 4 km (TTT)

Stage 1 result

	Team	Time
1	(Denmark) CSC–Saxo Bank	4' 05"
2	(Italy) Liquigas	+ 3"
3	(Spain) Caisse d'Epargne	+ 4"
4	(Netherlands) Rabobank	+ 6"
5	(Italy) Lampre	s.t.
6	(United States) Team High Road	+ 7"
7	(Belgium) Quick-Step	s.t.
8	(Germany) Team Milram	s.t.
9	(France) Française des Jeux	+ 8"
10	(Germany) Gerolsteiner	+ 9"

General classification after Stage 1

	Rider	Team	Time
1	Lars Bak (DEN)	CSC–Saxo Bank	4' 05"
2	Fränk Schleck (LUX)	CSC–Saxo Bank	s.t.
3	Fabian Cancellara (SUI)	CSC–Saxo Bank	s.t.
4	Andy Schleck (LUX)	CSC–Saxo Bank	s.t.
5	Gustav Larsson (SWE)	CSC–Saxo Bank	s.t.
6	Jens Voigt (GER)	CSC–Saxo Bank	s.t.
7	Franco Pellizotti (ITA)	Liquigas	+ 3"
8	Murilo Fischer (BRA)	Liquigas	s.t.
9	Maciej Bodnar (POL)	Liquigas	s.t.
10	Mauro Da Dalto (ITA)	Liquigas	s.t.

=== Stage 2 ===
15 September 2008 — Płock > Olsztyn – 231.2 km

Stage 2 result

	Rider	Team	Time
1	Allan Davis (AUS)	Quick-Step	6h 10' 53"
2	Murilo Fischer (BRA)	Liquigas	s.t.
3	Mirco Lorenzetto (ITA)	Lampre	s.t.
4	Giovanni Bernaudeau (FRA)	Bouygues Télécom	s.t.
5	Yauheni Hutarovich (BLR)	Française des Jeux	s.t.
6	Jürgen Roelandts (BEL)	Silence–Lotto	s.t.
7	Peter Wrolich (AUT)	Gerolsteiner	s.t.
8	Erki Pütsep (EST)	Bouygues Télécom	s.t.
9	Adam Wadecki (POL)	Polish national team	s.t.
10	Graeme Brown (AUS)	Rabobank	s.t.

General classification after Stage 2

	Rider	Team	Time
1	Murilo Fischer (BRA)	Liquigas	6h 14' 55"
2	Allan Davis (AUS)	Quick-Step	s.t.
3	Lars Bak (DEN)	CSC–Saxo Bank	+ 3"
4	Andy Schleck (LUX)	CSC–Saxo Bank	s.t.
5	Fränk Schleck (LUX)	CSC–Saxo Bank	s.t.
6	Jens Voigt (GER)	CSC–Saxo Bank	s.t.
7	Fabian Cancellara (SUI)	CSC–Saxo Bank	s.t.
8	Gustav Larsson (SWE)	CSC–Saxo Bank	s.t.
9	Mirco Lorenzetto (ITA)	Lampre	s.t.
10	Kjell Carlström (FIN)	Liquigas	s.t.

=== Stage 3 ===
16 September 2008 — Mikołajki > Białystok – 184.8 km

Stage 3 result

	Rider	Team	Time
1	Angelo Furlan (ITA)	Crédit Agricole	4h 26' 56"
2	Luciano Pagliarini (BRA)	Scott–American Beef	s.t.
3	Allan Davis (AUS)	Quick-Step	s.t.
4	Yauheni Hutarovich (BLR)	Française des Jeux	s.t.
5	Denis Flahaut (FRA)	Scott–American Beef	s.t.
6	Murilo Fischer (BRA)	Liquigas	s.t.
7	Graeme Brown (AUS)	Rabobank	s.t.
8	Krzysztof Jeżowski (POL)	Polish national team	s.t.
9	Andrea Grendene (ITA)	Lampre	s.t.
10	Jürgen Roelandts (BEL)	Silence–Lotto	s.t.

General classification after Stage 3

	Rider	Team	Time
1	Allan Davis (AUS)	Quick-Step	10h 41' 47"
2	Murilo Fischer (BRA)	Liquigas	+ 4"
3	Lars Bak (DEN)	CSC–Saxo Bank	+ 7"
4	Fränk Schleck (LUX)	CSC–Saxo Bank	s.t.
5	Andy Schleck (LUX)	CSC–Saxo Bank	s.t.
6	Gustav Larsson (SWE)	CSC–Saxo Bank	s.t.
7	Jens Voigt (GER)	CSC–Saxo Bank	s.t.
8	Mirco Lorenzetto (ITA)	Lampre	+ 9"
9	Angelo Furlan (ITA)	Crédit Agricole	s.t.
10	Mauro Da Dalto (ITA)	Liquigas	+ 10"

=== Stage 4 ===
September 17: Bielsk Podlaski > Lublin
The results of Stage 4 were annulled due to a protest on the finishing laps. The riders stopped riding within the wet and technical finishing circuit when they learned that time gap were counted within the last circuit lap. All results, including intermediate sprints during the stage, were annulled.

Stage 4 result

Rider	Team	Time
Annulled

General classification after Stage 4

	Rider	Team	Time
1	Allan Davis (AUS)	Quick-Step	10h 41' 47"
2	Murilo Fischer (BRA)	Liquigas	+ 4"
3	Lars Bak (DEN)	CSC–Saxo Bank	+ 7"
4	Fränk Schleck (LUX)	CSC–Saxo Bank	+ 7"
5	Andy Schleck (LUX)	CSC–Saxo Bank	+ 7"
6	Gustav Larsson (SWE)	CSC–Saxo Bank	+ 7"
7	Jens Voigt (GER)	CSC–Saxo Bank	+ 7"
8	Mirco Lorenzetto (ITA)	Lampre	+ 9"
9	Angelo Furlan (ITA)	Crédit Agricole	+ 9"
10	Mauro Da Dalto (ITA)	Liquigas	+ 10"

=== Stage 5 ===
September 18: Nałęczów > Rzeszów

Stage 5 result

	Rider	Team	Time
1	Jürgen Roelandts (BEL)	Silence–Lotto	5h 18' 59"
2	José Joaquín Rojas Gil (ESP)	Caisse d'Epargne	s.t.
3	Steven de Jongh (NED)	Quick-Step	s.t.
4	Peter Wrolich (AUT)	Gerolsteiner	s.t.
5	Francesco Gavazzi (ITA)	Lampre	s.t.
6	Grégory Rast (SUI)	Astana	s.t.
7	Marcus Burghardt (GER)	Team Columbia	s.t.
8	Aleksandr Kuschynski (BLR)	Liquigas	s.t.
9	Luca Barla (ITA)	Team Milram	s.t.
10	Lars Bak (DEN)	CSC–Saxo Bank	s.t.

General classification after Stage 5

	Rider	Team	Time
1	José Joaquín Rojas Gil (ESP)	Caisse d'Epargne	16h 00' 51"
2	Lars Bak (DEN)	CSC–Saxo Bank	+ 2"
3	Steven de Jongh (NED)	Quick-Step	+ 5"
4	Allan Davis (AUS)	Quick-Step	+ 7"
5	Francesco Gavazzi (ITA)	Lampre	+ 8"
6	Marcus Burghardt (GER)	Team Columbia	+ 9"
7	Luis León Sánchez (ESP)	Caisse d'Epargne	+ 10"
8	Murilo Fischer (BRA)	Liquigas	+ 11"
9	Peter Wrolich (AUT)	Gerolsteiner	+ 11"
10	Bram de Groot (NED)	Rabobank	+ 11"

=== Stage 6 ===
September 19: Krynica-Zdrój > Zakopane

Stage 6 result

	Rider	Team	Time
1	Jens Voigt (GER)	CSC–Saxo Bank	3h 05' 55"
2	Tony Martin (GER)	Team Columbia	+ 47"
3	Franco Pellizotti (ITA)	Liquigas	+ 1' 15"
4	Marek Rutkiewicz (POL)	Polish National Team	s.t.
5	Allan Davis (AUS)	Quick-Step	+ 1' 24"
6	Fabian Wegmann (GER)	Gerolsteiner	s.t.
7	Aleksandr Kuschynski (BLR)	Liquigas	s.t.
8	Francesco Gavazzi (ITA)	Lampre	s.t.
9	Mirco Lorenzetto (ITA)	Lampre	s.t.
10	Pieter Weening (NED)	Rabobank	s.t.

General classification after Stage 6

	Rider	Team	Time
1	Jens Voigt (GER)	CSC–Saxo Bank	19h 06' 50"
2	Lars Bak (DEN)	CSC–Saxo Bank	+ 1' 22"
3	Franco Pellizotti (ITA)	Liquigas	+ 1' 24"
4	Allan Davis (AUS)	Quick-Step	+ 1' 27"
5	Francesco Gavazzi (ITA)	Lampre	+ 1' 28"
6	Grégory Rast (SUI)	Astana	+ 1' 33"
7	Fränk Schleck (LUX)	CSC–Saxo Bank	+ 1' 34"
8	Mirco Lorenzetto (ITA)	Lampre	+ 1' 36"
9	Kjell Carlström (FIN)	Liquigas	+ 1' 37"
10	Aleksandr Kuschynski (BLR)	Liquigas	+ 1' 37"

=== Stage 7 ===
September 20: Rabka Zdrój > Kraków

Stage 7 result

	Rider	Team	Time
1	Robert Förster (GER)	Gerolsteiner	2h 06' 28"
2	Alberto Curtolo (ITA)	Liquigas	s.t.
3	Yauheni Hutarovich (BLR)	Française des Jeux	s.t.
4	Peter Wrolich (AUT)	Gerolsteiner	s.t.
5	Angelo Furlan (ITA)	Crédit Agricole	s.t.
6	Jürgen Roelandts (BEL)	Silence–Lotto	s.t.
7	Krzysztof Jeżowski (POL)	Polish National Team	s.t.
8	Francesco Gavazzi (ITA)	Lampre	s.t.
9	Dominik Roels (GER)	Team Milram	s.t.
10	Mirco Lorenzetto (ITA)	Lampre	s.t.

General classification after Stage 7

	Rider	Team	Time
1	Jens Voigt (GER)	CSC–Saxo Bank	21h 13' 18"
2	Lars Bak (DEN)	CSC–Saxo Bank	+ 1' 22"
3	Franco Pellizotti (ITA)	Liquigas	+ 1' 24"
4	Allan Davis (AUS)	Quick-Step	+ 1' 27"
5	Francesco Gavazzi (ITA)	Lampre	+ 1' 28"
6	Grégory Rast (SUI)	Astana	+ 1' 33"
7	Mirco Lorenzetto (ITA)	Lampre	+ 1' 36"
8	David Loosli (SUI)	Lampre	+ 1' 37"
9	Kjell Carlström (FIN)	Liquigas	+ 1' 37"
10	Marek Rutkiewicz (POL)	Polish National Team	+ 1' 37"

== Category leadership table ==
Stage	Winner	General classification Żółta koszulka	Mountains classification Klasyfikacja górska	Points classification Klasyfikacja punktowa	Intermediate Sprints Classification Klasyfikacja najaktywniejszych
1 (TTT)	CSC–Saxo Bank	Lars Bak			
2	Allan Davis	Murilo Fischer	Łukasz Bodnar	Allan Davis	
3	Angelo Furlan	Allan Davis	Łukasz Bodnar	Allan Davis	Andoni Lafuente
4	Annulled				
5	Jürgen Roelandts	José Joaquín Rojas Gil	Marcin Sapa	Allan Davis	Marcin Sapa
6	Jens Voigt	Jens Voigt	Tony Martin	Allan Davis	Marcin Sapa
7	Robert Förster	Jens Voigt	Jens Voigt	Allan Davis	Marcin Sapa
Final		Jens Voigt	Jens Voigt	Allan Davis	Marcin Sapa

== Standings ==
=== General classification ===
	Rider	Team	Time	UCI ProTour Points
1	Jens Voigt (GER)	CSC–Saxo Bank	21h 13' 18"	50
2	Lars Bak (DEN)	CSC–Saxo Bank	+ 1' 22"	40
3	Franco Pellizotti (ITA)	Liquigas	+ 1' 24"	35
4	Allan Davis (AUS)	Quick-Step	+ 1' 27"	30
5	Francesco Gavazzi (ITA)	Lampre	+ 1' 28"	25
6	Grégory Rast (SUI)	Astana	+ 1' 33"	20
7	Mirco Lorenzetto (ITA)	Lampre	+ 1' 36"	15
8	David Loosli (SUI)	Lampre	+ 1' 37"	10
9	Kjell Carlström (FIN)	Liquigas	s.t.	5
10	Marek Rutkiewicz (POL)	Polish national team	s.t.	2

=== King of the Mountains Classification ===
	Rider	Team	Points
1	Jens Voigt (GER)	CSC–Saxo Bank	29
2	Marek Rutkiewicz (POL)	Polish national team	18
3	Markel Irizar (ESP)	Euskaltel–Euskadi	11
4	Marco Bandiera (ITA)	Lampre	10
5	Marcin Sapa (POL)	Polish national team	10
6	Pablo Lastras (ESP)	Caisse d'Epargne	8
7	David Loosli (SUI)	Lampre	7
8	Sylwester Szmyd (POL)	Lampre	5
9	Aleksandr Kuschynski (BLR)	Liquigas	5
10	Perrig Quéméneur (FRA)	Bouygues Télécom	5

== See also ==
- 2008 in road cycling
