= Jacopo Guarnieri =

Italian racing cyclist (born 1987)

- Guarnieri at the 2018 Tour Poitou-Charentes en Nouvelle-Aquitaine

Personal information
- Full name: Jacopo Guarnieri
- Born: 14 August 1987 (age 39) Vizzolo Predabissi, Italy
- Height: 1.89 m (6 ft 2 1/2 in)
- Weight: 78 kg (172 lb; 12 st 4 lb)

Cycling career
- Sport: Cycling
- Disciplines: Road; Track
- Role: Rider
- Rider type: Sprinter; Lead-out man

Amateur teams
- 2006–2008: Marchiol–Ima–Famila–Liquigas–Site
- 2008: Liquigas (stagiaire)

Professional teams
- 2009–2011: Liquigas
- 2012–2014: Astana
- 2015–2016: Team Katusha
- 2017–2022: FDJ
- 2023–2024: Lotto–Dstny

Jacopo Guarnieri (born 14 August 1987) is an Italian former road bicycle racer, who competed as a professional from 2009 to 2024 for five different teams.

During the early part of his professional career, Guarnieri took four victories, including stage victories at the Tour de Pologne in 2009 and 2010. In the later part of his career, he was used as a lead-out man for sprinters such as Alexander Kristoff at Team Katusha, Arnaud Démare at Groupama–FDJ and Caleb Ewan at Lotto–Dstny.

== Career ==
=== Junior and amateur career ===
Born in Vizzolo Predabissi, Guarnieri finished in the top ten in the road race at both the UCI Junior World Championships (fourth) and the UEC European Junior Road Championships (eighth) in 2005. He also finished third in the Driedaagse van Axel, and won the points classification at the race. Ageing out of the juniors for 2006, Guarnieri joined the Marchiol–Ima–Famila–Liquigas–Site team, where he took several successes in 2007 – winning the Circuito del Porto and Trofeo Alcide De Gasperi one-day races, as well as a stage at the Olympia's Tour. The following year, he won the ZLM Tour – held as part of the UCI Under 23 Nations' Cup – and the opening stage of the Giro delle Regioni, which earned him a contract as a stagiaire with Liquigas towards the end of 2008.

=== Liquigas (2009–2011) ===
Guarnieri signed permanently with Liquigas for the 2009 season, and in his second start with the team, he finished second to Alessandro Petacchi at February's Gran Premio della Costa Etruschi. Later in the season, he took his first professional victory when he won the third stage of the Tour de Pologne into Lublin, beating Allan Davis and André Greipel in the sprint. In 2010, he recorded another early season second-placed finish, to Roberto Ferrari at the Giro del Friuli in March, before taking another stage victory at the Tour de Pologne, winning the opening stage in Warsaw to take the race lead. He made his Grand Tour début at the Vuelta a España, before finishing fourth overall at the Circuit Franco-Belge, winning the second stage into Poperinge as part of a 1–2–3 for Liquigas–Doimo. He took one further victory with the team in 2011, when he won stage 3a of the Three Days of De Panne.

=== Astana (2012–2014) ===
Guarnieri transferred to Astana for the 2012 season, having signed an initial two-year contract with the team. In his first season, Guarnieri's best individual result was a second-place stage finish on the opening stage of the Three Days of De Panne – beaten only by his former teammate Peter Sagan – while he also finished in fourth place at the Grote Prijs Stad Zottegem one-day race. Despite no top-five results in 2013, Guarnieri remained with the team into the 2014 season, but suffered a fractured fibula early in the year at Tirreno–Adriatico. He missed two months of racing as a result, and his best finish thereafter, was second place on stages at the Tour of Austria and the Tour de Pologne.

=== Team Katusha (2015–2016) ===
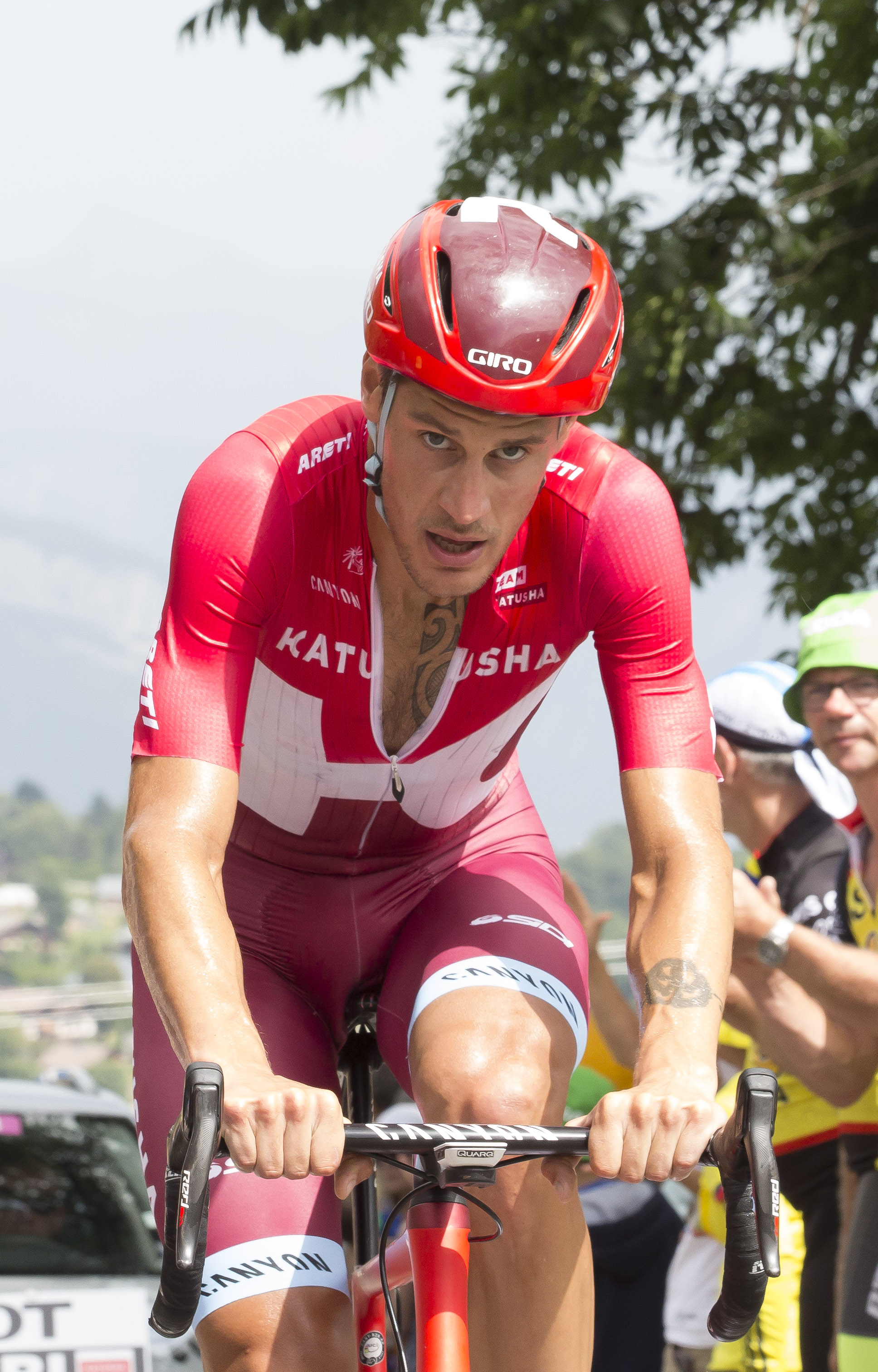
Guarnieri at the 2016 Tour de France

In September 2014 it was announced that Guarnieri would join Team Katusha from 2015 on a two-year contract, with the team's general manager Viatcheslav Ekimov emphasising Guarnieri's role as part of the sprint train, as a lead-out man, for Alexander Kristoff. Guarnieri supported the majority of Kristoff's twenty victories during his first season at the team, but they went winless at the Tour de France where Guarnieri made his début. Guarnieri's best individual result of the year was a second-place stage finish at the Eneco Tour, losing out to André Greipel in a sprint finish. Guarnieri supported a further eight victories for Kristoff in 2016, with one such instance at the Tour of Qatar resulting in Guarnieri taking third on the stage.

=== FDJ (2017–2022) ===
After two seasons with Team Katusha, Guarnieri joined FDJ for the 2017 season on an initial two-year contract, forming part of the sprint train for the team's main sprinter Arnaud Démare. On their first stage working together, Démare won the opening stage of Étoile de Bessèges in Beaucaire. Guarnieri formed part of a further seven victories for Démare, including stage wins at Paris–Nice, the Critérium du Dauphiné and the Tour de France. At the Tour de France, he was involved in an incident with Nacer Bouhanni, with Guarnieri apologising for comments aimed at Bouhanni. Guarnieri assisted a further nine wins for Démare in 2018, including another Tour de France stage victory, where Guarnieri had moved Démare to the front on the run-in to the finish in Pau. He extended his contract with the team for a further two years in August 2018, until the end of the 2020 season.

Guarnieri made his début at the 2019 Giro d'Italia, as part of the sprint train for Démare, with Démare winning the tenth stage. They returned to the race the following year, held in October due to the COVID-19 pandemic, with Démare having taken nine victories to that point in the season. In the first half of the race, Groupama–FDJ had prioritised four sprint stages for Démare – and won them all with lead-outs from Guarnieri and Ignatas Konovalovas, with Guarnieri later stating that the team had ridden the "perfect Giro d'Italia", as Démare won the points classification. He also signed a further two-year contract extension with the team, until the end of the 2022 season. Guarnieri had formed part of all Démare's victories in the 2021 season, prior to the Tour de France, with the latter targeting sprint victories at the race. Guarnieri and Démare both finished outside the time limit after the ninth stage, and were eliminated. The duo rode the 2022 Giro d'Italia, with Démare winning three stages and the points classification at the race.

=== Lotto–Dstny (2023–2024) ===
After six seasons with Groupama–FDJ, Guarnieri signed a two-year contract with Lotto–Soudal – later renamed as Lotto–Dstny – from the 2023 season, signing to be a member of the sprint train for the team's sprinters such as Caleb Ewan and Arnaud De Lie. He was part of the sprint train that led Ewan to victory at the 2023 Van Merksteijn Fences Classic, and was selected for that year's Tour de France, but had to abandon the race with broken ribs after a crash in the final sprint of stage four at the Circuit Paul Armagnac in Nogaro. In September 2024, he announced his retirement from the sport.

== Personal life ==
Guarnieri has a daughter whom he co-parents with a former partner. He formed part of British broadcaster ITV Sport's coverage of the 2024 Tour de France, providing analysis on the first four stages of the race. He also commentated on the world feed coverage of the 2025 Giro d'Italia, working with Ned Boulting, whom he had previously worked with as part of the ITV Sport Tour de France coverage.

== Major results ==
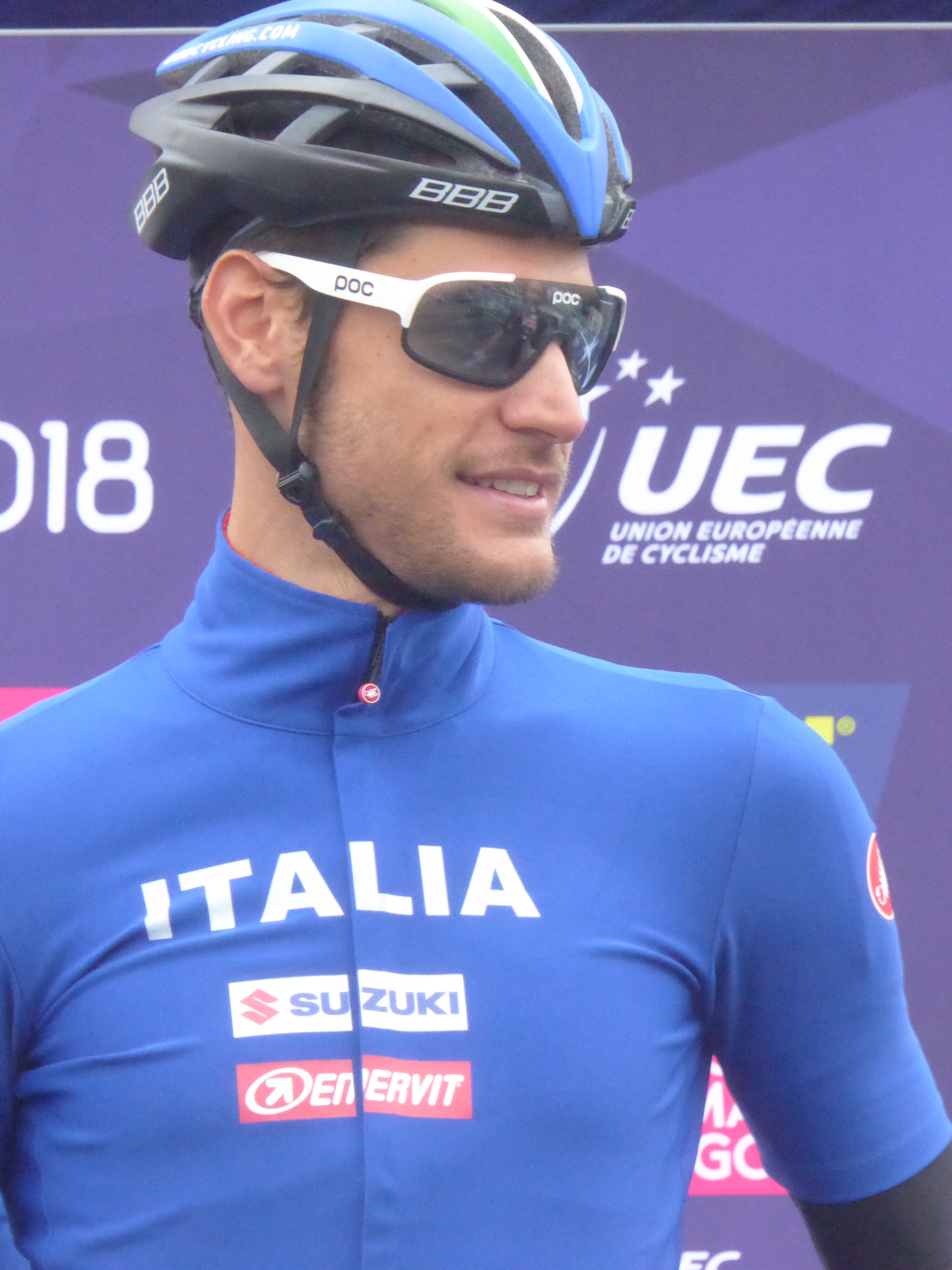
Guarnieri at the 2018 European Road Cycling Championships

2005
3rd Overall Driedaagse van Axel

1st Points classification

4th Road race, UCI Junior World Championships
8th Road race, UEC European Junior Road Championships
2007
1st Trofeo Alcide De Gasperi
1st Circuito del Porto
1st Stage 7 Olympia's Tour
6th Road race, UEC European Under-23 Road Championships
2008
1st ZLM Tour
1st Stage 1 Giro delle Regioni
2009 (1 pro win)
1st Stage 3 Tour de Pologne
2nd Six Days of Fiorenzuola (with Bruno Risi)
2nd Gran Premio della Costa Etruschi
10th Vattenfall Cyclassics
2010 (2)
1st Stage 1 Tour de Pologne
2nd Giro del Friuli
3rd Six Days of Fiorenzuola (with Danny Stam)
4th Overall Circuit Franco-Belge

1st Stage 2

2011 (1)
1st Six Days of Fiorenzuola (with Elia Viviani)
1st Stage 3a Three Days of De Panne
7th Gran Premio Nobili Rubinetterie
2012
4th Grote Prijs Stad Zottegem
2016
5th Paris–Bourges
6th Gran Premio Bruno Beghelli
8th Gent–Wevelgem

=== Grand Tour general classification results timeline ===
| Grand Tour | 2010 | 2011 | 2012 | 2013 | 2014 | 2015 | 2016 | 2017 | 2018 | 2019 | 2020 | 2021 | 2022 | 2023 |
|---|---|---|---|---|---|---|---|---|---|---|---|---|---|---|
| Giro d'Italia | — | — | — | — | — | — | — | — | — | 132 | 128 | — | 136 | — |
| Tour de France | — | — | — | — | — | 149 | 165 | DNF | 144 | — | — | DNF | — | DNF |
| Vuelta a España | 149 | — | — | — | 150 | — | — | — | — | — | — | DNF | — | — |

Legend
| — | Did not compete |
| DNF | Did not finish |
