= Mickaël Buffaz =

French cyclist

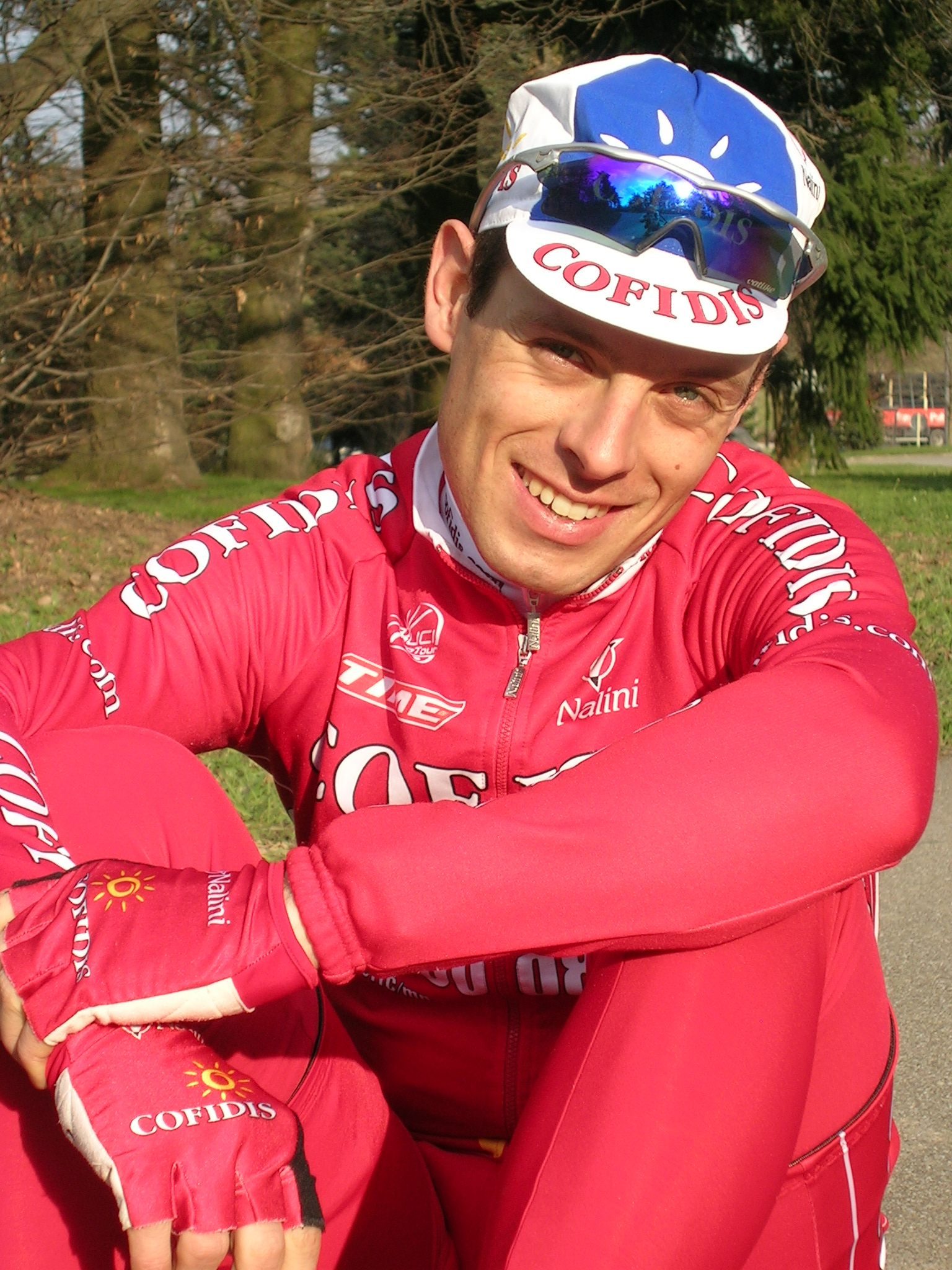
- Buffaz in 2007

Personal information
- Full name: Mickaël Buffaz
- Born: 21 May 1979 (age 47) Switzerland
- Height: 1.75 m (5 ft 9 in)
- Weight: 64 kg (141 lb)

Cycling career
- Sport: Cycling
- Current team: Retired
- Discipline: Road
- Role: Rider

Professional teams
- 2003–2004: Jean Delatour
- 2005–2006: Agritubel–Loudun
- 2007–2012: Cofidis

Mickaël Buffaz (born 21 May 1979 in Geneva, Switzerland) is a former French professional road bicycle racer.

== Major results ==
2002
1st Paris–Troyes
2003
1st Overall Mi-Août Bretonne
1st Prix des Moissons
7th Tour du Doubs
2004
2nd Tour du Finistère
2005
3rd Polynormande
6th Overall Tour Nord-Isère
2006
2nd Tour du Doubs
8th Grand Prix de Plumelec-Morbihan
8th Overall Regio-Tour
8th Overall Tour de l'Ain
2007
2nd Polynormande
9th Overall Tour de l'Ain
2008
4th Polynormande
5th Overall Tour Down Under
2009
1st Stage 1 Tour de l'Ain
2010
1st Overall Paris–Corrèze

1st Stage 1

4th Road race, National Road Championships

=== Grand Tour general classification results timeline ===
Grand Tour	2007	2008	2009	2010	2011	2012
Giro d'Italia	126	121	—	DNF	—	—
Tour de France	—	—	—	—	131	—
Vuelta a España	—	—	89	DNF	—	45

Legend
DSQ	Disqualified
DNF	Did not finish
