= 2008 UCI ProTour =

Cycling competition

- Fourth edition of the UCI ProTour

Details
- Dates: 22 January – 21 September
- Location: Australia and Europe
- Races: 15

Champions
- Individual champion: Alejandro Valverde (ESP) (Caisse d'Epargne)
- Teams' champion: Caisse d'Epargne
- Nations' champion: Spain

The 2008 UCI ProTour is the fourth year of the UCI ProTour system. Following protracted disagreement between the organisers of the Grand Tours (ASO, RCS and Unipublic) and the UCI, all races organized by ASO, RCS and Unipublic were withdrawn from the ProTour calendar. This removed all three Grand Tours (Giro d'Italia, Tour de France and Vuelta a España), four of the five monuments (Milan–San Remo, Paris–Roubaix, Liège–Bastogne–Liège and Giro di Lombardia) and four further races (Paris–Nice, Tirreno–Adriatico, La Flèche Wallonne and Paris–Tours). As such, the quality of the races of the ProTour was diminished. The Australian race, the Tour Down Under was added to the calendar, making it the first race outside Europe on the ProTour (although races had previously been held outside Europe as part of the UCI Road World Cup).

The highly successful U.S. Postal Service ceased operations at the end of the 2007 season. Johan Bruyneel signed on to become the directeur sportif and revamp the embattled Astana; joining him are 2007 Tour de France champion Alberto Contador and 2007 Tour of California champion Levi Leipheimer. Other major signings included American George Hincapie moving to Team High Road and Daniele Bennati from Lampre to Liquigas, while Giro d'Italia winner Danilo Di Luca left Liguigas for the UCI Professional Continental team LPR Brakes–Ballan.

== 2008 UCI ProTour races ==
As of September 28, 2008.

| Dates | Race | Winner | ProTour leader |
|---|---|---|---|
| 22–27 January | (Australia) Tour Down Under | André Greipel (GER) (Team High Road) | André Greipel (GER) (Team High Road) |
| 6 April | (Belgium) Tour of Flanders | Stijn Devolder (BEL) (Soudal–Quick-Step) | André Greipel (GER) (Team High Road) |
| 7–12 April | (Spain) Vuelta al País Vasco | Alberto Contador (ESP) (Astana) | André Greipel (GER) (Team High Road) |
| 9 April | (Belgium) Gent–Wevelgem | Óscar Freire (ESP) (Rabobank) | André Greipel (GER) (Team High Road) |
| 20 April | (Netherlands) Amstel Gold Race | Damiano Cunego (ITA) (Lampre) | Damiano Cunego (ITA) (Lampre) |
| 29 April–4 May | (Switzerland) Tour de Romandie | Andreas Klöden (GER) (Astana) | Damiano Cunego (ITA) (Lampre) |
| 19–25 May | (Spain) Volta a Catalunya | Gustavo César (ESP) (Karpin–Galicia) | Damiano Cunego (ITA) (Lampre) |
| 8–15 June | (France) Dauphiné Libéré | Alejandro Valverde (ESP) (Caisse d'Epargne) | Cadel Evans (AUS) (Silence–Lotto) |
| 14–22 June | (Switzerland) Tour de Suisse | Roman Kreuziger (CZE) (Liquigas) | Damiano Cunego (ITA) (Lampre) |
| 2 August | (Spain) Clásica de San Sebastián | Alejandro Valverde (ESP) (Caisse d'Epargne) | Alejandro Valverde (ESP) (Caisse d'Epargne) |
| 20–27 August | (Belgium) / (Netherlands) Eneco Tour of Benelux | Iván Gutiérrez (ESP) (Caisse d'Epargne) | Alejandro Valverde (ESP) (Caisse d'Epargne) |
| 25 August | GP Ouest-France | Pierrick Fédrigo (FRA) (Bouygues Télécom) | Alejandro Valverde (ESP) (Caisse d'Epargne) |
| 29 August– 6 September | (Germany) Deutschland Tour | Linus Gerdemann (GER) (Team Columbia) | Alejandro Valverde (ESP) (Caisse d'Epargne) |
| 7 September | (Germany) Vattenfall Cyclassics | Robbie McEwen (AUS) (Silence–Lotto) | Alejandro Valverde (ESP) (Caisse d'Epargne) |
| 15–21 September | (Poland) Tour de Pologne | Jens Voigt (GER) (CSC–Saxo Bank) | Alejandro Valverde (ESP) (Caisse d'Epargne) |

== Teams ==
As of 6 December 6, 2007

| Code | Official Team Name | Country | Website |
|---|---|---|---|
| ALM | Ag2r–La Mondiale | France | |
| AST | Astana | Luxembourg | |
| BTL | Bouygues Télécom | France | |
| GCE | Caisse d'Epargne | Spain | |
| COF | Cofidis | France | |
| C.A | Crédit Agricole | France | |
| CSC | Team CSC | Denmark | |
| SIL | Silence–Lotto | Belgium | |
| EUS | Euskaltel–Euskadi | Spain | |
| FDJ | Française des Jeux | France | |
| GST | Gerolsteiner | Germany | |
| LAM | Lampre | Italy | |
| LIQ | Liquigas | Italy | |
| MRM | Team Milram | Germany | |
| QST | Quick-Step | Belgium | |
| RAB | Rabobank | Netherlands | |
| SDV | Saunier Duval–Scott | Spain | |
| THR | Team High Road | United States | |

Unibet.com Cycling Team, whose sponsors have pulled out of cycling, failed to submit its application renewal by the November 20, 2007 deadline.

== Individual standings ==
| Rank | Name | Team | Points |
|---|---|---|---|
| 1 | Alejandro Valverde (ESP) | Caisse d'Epargne | 123 |
| 2 | Damiano Cunego (ITA) | Lampre | 104 |
| 3 | Andreas Klöden (GER) | Astana | 96 |
| 4 | Roman Kreuziger (CZE) | Liquigas | 94 |
| 5 | Cadel Evans (AUS) | Silence–Lotto | 85 |
| 6 | André Greipel (GER) | Team High Road | 62 |
| 7 | Mikel Astarloza (ESP) | Euskaltel–Euskadi | 60 |
| 8 | Alberto Contador (ESP) | Astana | 58 |
| 9 | Thomas Dekker (NED) | Rabobank | 54 |
| 10 | Stijn Devolder (BEL) | Quick-Step | 50 |

- 107 riders have scored at least one point on the 2008 UCI ProTour.

== Team standings ==
| Rank | Team | Nationality | Points |
|---|---|---|---|
| 1 | Caisse d'Epargne | Spain | 147 |
| 2 | Astana | Kazakhstan | 145 |
| 3 | Team CSC | Denmark | 126 |
| 4 | Euskaltel–Euskadi | Spain | 114 |
| 5 | Team High Road | United States | 111 |
| 6 | Saunier Duval–Scott | Spain | 109 |
| 7 | Silence–Lotto | Belgium | 108 |
| 8 | Liquigas | Italy | 107 |
| 9 | Rabobank | Netherlands | 105 |
| 10 | Gerolsteiner | Germany | 102 |
| 11 | Française des Jeux | France | 102 |
| 12 | Quick-Step | Belgium | 95 |
| 13 | Crédit Agricole | France | 76 |
| 14 | Ag2r–La Mondiale | France | 94 |
| 15 | Bouygues Télécom | France | 93 |
| 16 | Cofidis | France | 73 |
| 17 | Lampre | Italy | 63 |
| 18 | Team Milram | Germany | 54 |

== Nation standings ==
| Rank | Nation | Points |
|---|---|---|
| 1 | Spain | 336 |
| 2 | Italy | 237 |
| 3 | Germany | 198 |
| 4 | Belgium | 155 |
| 5 | France | 147 |
| 6 | Australia | 113 |
| 7 | Czech Republic | 94 |
| 8 | Luxembourg | 94 |
| 9 | Netherlands | 80 |
| 10 | Russia | 86 |

- Riders from 23 nations have scored at least one point on the 2008 UCI ProTour.

== 2008 ProTour Points System ==
| Place | Tour Down Under Tour of Flanders Vuelta Ciclista al Pais Vasco Tour de Romandie Volta Ciclista a Catalunya Critérium du Dauphiné Libéré Tour de Suisse Deutschland Tour Eneco Tour Tour de Pologne | Gent–Wevelgem Amstel Gold Race Vattenfall Cyclassics Clasica Ciclista San Sebastian GP Quest France-Plouay | Eindhoven Team Time Trial |
|---|---|---|---|
Overall Classification
| 1st | 50 | 40 | 10 |
| 2nd | 40 | 30 | 9 |
| 3rd | 35 | 25 | 8 |
| 4th | 30 | 20 | 7 |
| 5th | 25 | 15 | 6 |
| 6th | 20 | 11 | 5 |
| 7th | 15 | 7 | 4 |
| 8th | 10 | 5 | 3 |
| 9th | 5 | 3 | 2 |
| 10th | 2 | 1 | 1 |
Stage wins (if applicable)
| 1st | 3 | | |
| 2nd | 2 | | |
| 3rd | 1 | | |

- If a rider is not part of UCI ProTour, no points are given. The points corresponding to the place are not awarded
- Top 20 teams get points in scale 20-19-18...1.
- Team time trials in stage races doesn't give points for riders.
- In Eindhoven time trial rider has to finish to earn points.
- In country ranking, top 5 riders of each country count towards the ranking.
