= Angelo Furlan =

Italian cyclist

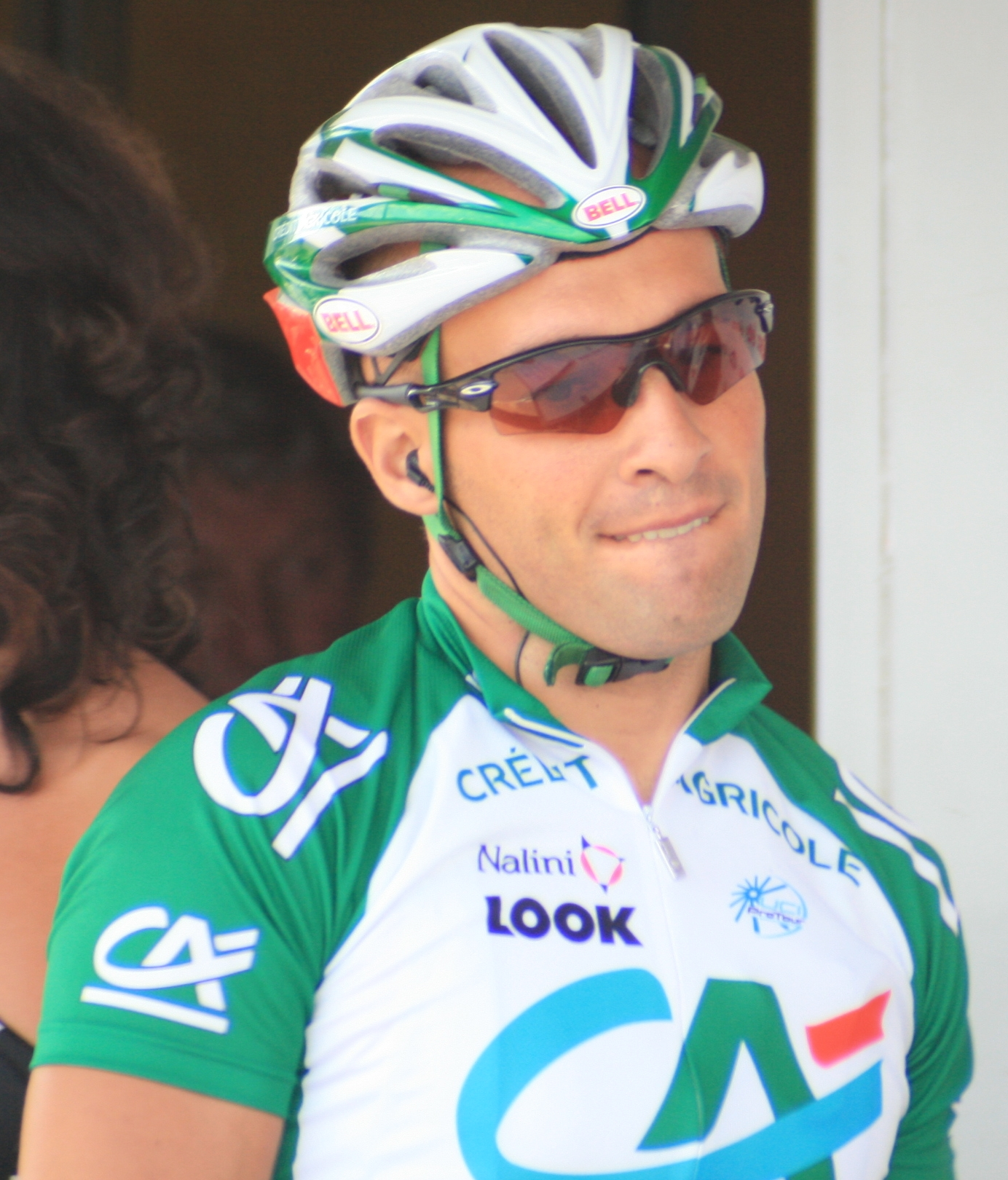
- Furlan in 2008

Personal information
- Full name: Angelo Furlan
- Born: 21 June 1977 (age 49) Arzignano, Italy
- Height: 1.74 m (5 ft 9 in)
- Weight: 70 kg (154 lb)

Cycling career
- Sport: Cycling
- Discipline: Road
- Role: Rider

Professional teams
- 2001–2004: Alessio
- 2005: Domina Vacanze
- 2006: Selle Italia–Diquigiovanni
- 2007–2008: Crédit Agricole
- 2009–2010: Lampre–NGC
- 2011–2013: Christina Watches–Onfone

Major wins
- Grand Tours Vuelta a España 2 individual stages (2002)

Angelo Furlan (born 21 June 1977) is an Italian former professional road bicycle racer.

== Major results ==
2000
2nd Circuito del Porto
2001
1st Stage 2 Tour de Pologne
Tour de Serbie

1st Stage 1 & 2

4th Gran Premio Bruno Beghelli
2002
Vuelta a España

1st Stages 17 & 20

2003
4th Grand Prix de Rennes
2004
1st Coppa Bernocchi
4th Giro della Provincia di Reggio Calabria
4th Classic Haribo
2006
6th Tour du Finistère
2007
1st Stage 1 Étoile de Bessèges
1st Stage 1 Circuit de la Sarthe
9th Grand Prix de Rennes
2008
1st Stage 3 Tour de Pologne
1st Stage 4 Étoile de Bessèges
1st Stage 2 Volta ao Distrito de Santarém
8th Tour de Vendée
10th Châteauroux Classic
2009
1st Stage 2 Critérium du Dauphiné Libéré
1st Stage 2 Tour de Pologne
7th Overall Tour of Qatar
2010
2nd Paris–Tours
2011
1st Tallinn–Tartu GP
Tour de Serbie

1st Stages 1, 4 & 5

10th Overall Course de Solidarność et des Champions Olympiques
10th Tartu GP
2012
1st Stage 1 (TTT) Tour of China I
3rd Dorpenomloop Rucphen
2013
1st Stage 2 Tour of Estonia
5th Overall Tour of China II
10th Jūrmala Grand Prix
