= David Loosli =

Swiss cyclist

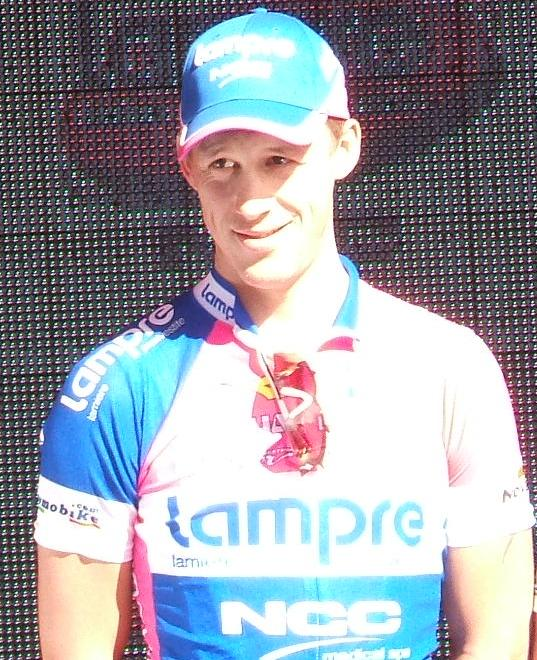
- Loosli at the 2009 Tour Down Under

Personal information
- Born: 8 May 1980 (age 46) Bern, Switzerland
- Height: 1.82 m (6 ft 0 in)
- Weight: 70 kg (154 lb)

Cycling career
- Sport: Cycling
- Current team: Retired
- Discipline: Road
- Role: Rider

Professional teams
- 2004: Saeco
- 2005–2011: Lampre–Caffita

David Loosli (born 8 May 1980) is a Swiss former professional road bicycle racer, who competed as a professional between 2004 and 2011, mainly for UCI ProTeam Lampre–Caffita, retiring as a member of the squad.

Loosli has been organising the Tour de Suisse since 2013.

== Major results ==
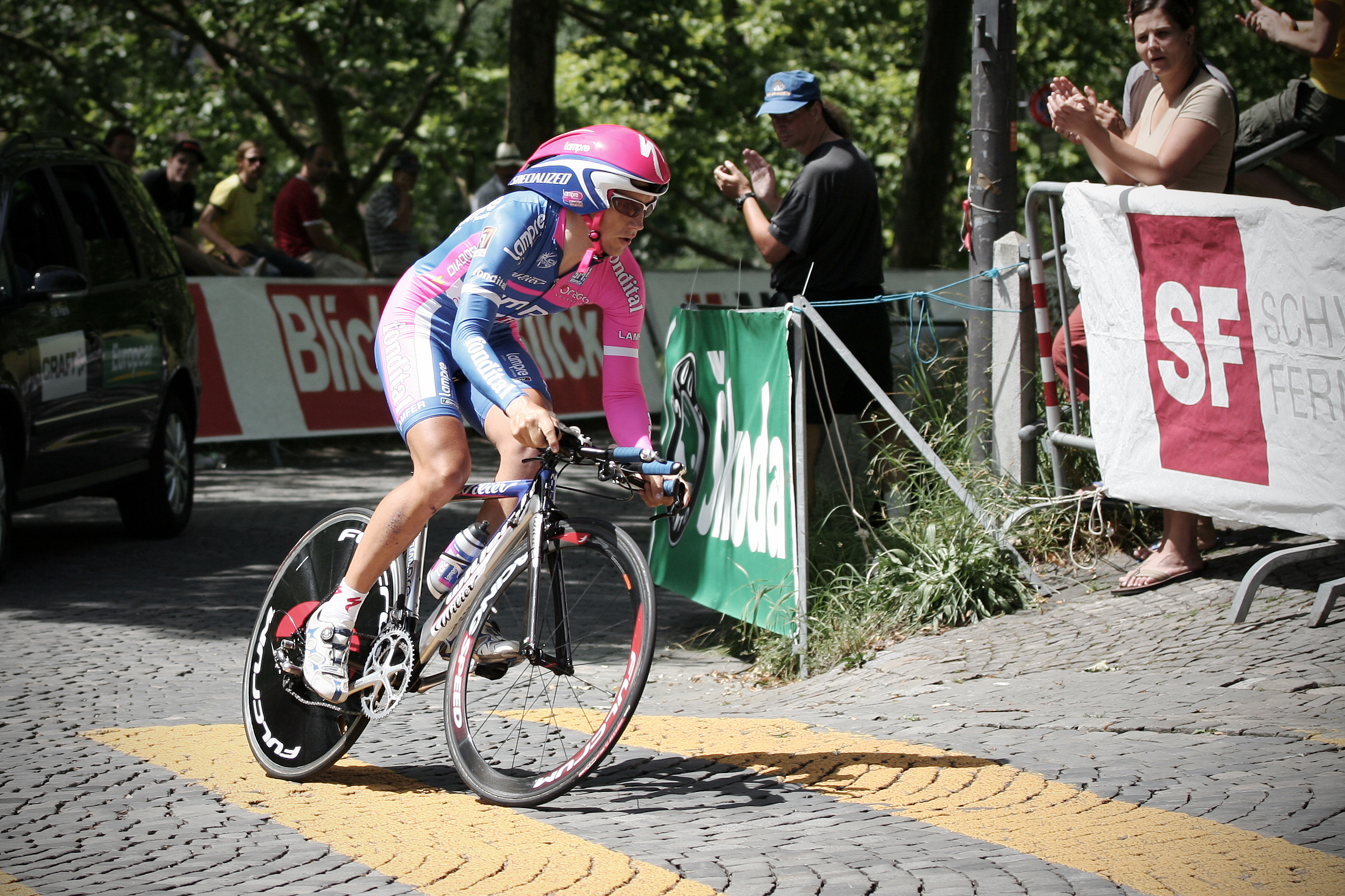
Loosli at the 2007 Tour de Suisse

1998
3rd Road race, National Junior Road Championships
2002
1st Stage 6 Thüringen Rundfahrt
3rd Road race, UCI Under-23 Road World Championships
4th Overall GP Tell
9th Overall Le Transalsace
2003
1st Overall Flèche du Sud

1st Stage 3

5th Giro del Lago Maggiore
2004
1st Stage 8 Peace Race
2006
1st Sprints classification Tour de Romandie
7th Overall Tour Méditerranéen
2007
3rd Road race, National Road Championships
2008
8th Overall Tour de Pologne
2009
1st Sprints classification Tour de Pologne
7th Rund um die Nürnberger Altstadt
2011
10th Overall Bayern-Rundfahrt

=== Grand Tour general classification results timeline ===
Grand Tour	2004	2005	2006	2007	2008	2009	2010	2011
Giro d'Italia	—	—	—	—	63	—	DNF	—
Tour de France	105	99	—	—	53	—	—	59
Vuelta a España	—	—	63	85	—	—	—	—

Legend
—	Did not compete
DNF	Did not finish
