= 2009 Tour de Pologne =

Cycling race

2009 UCI World Ranking, race 19 of 24

Race details
- Dates: 2 – 8 August
- Stages: 7
- Distance: 1,158.1 km (719.6 mi)
- Winning time: 28:46:13

Results
Jersey awarded to the overall winner	Winner	Alessandro Ballan (ITA)	(Lampre–NGC)
	Second	Daniel Moreno (ESP)	(Caisse d'Epargne)
	Third	Edvald Boasson Hagen (NOR)	(Team Columbia–HTC)
Jersey awarded to the points classification winner	Points	Jürgen Roelandts (BEL)	(Silence–Lotto)
Jersey awarded to the mountains classification winner	Mountains	Marek Rutkiewicz (POL)	(Team Poland Bank BGŻ)
Jersey awarded to the sprints classification winner	Sprints	David Loosli (SUI)	(Lampre–NGC)

The 2009 Tour de Pologne was the 66th running of the Tour de Pologne, in the 81st year since the first edition. The event was part of both the 2009 UCI ProTour and the inaugural World Calendar, and ran from 2–8 August, starting in Warsaw and finishing in Kraków. After four stages that were dominated by sprint finishes, World champion Alessandro Ballan's participation in successful breaks in stages five and six, and bonus time for being first and second respectively in those stages, brought him overall victory.

== Stages ==
There is a circuit of at least two laps on every stage.

=== Stage 1 ===
2 August 2009 – Warsaw, 108 km

Stage 1 Result

	Rider	Team	Time
1	Borut Božič (SLO)	Vacansoleil	2h 12' 56"
2	André Greipel (GER)	Team Columbia–HTC	s.t.
3	Francesco Gavazzi (ITA)	Lampre–NGC	s.t.
4	Jacopo Guarnieri (ITA)	Liquigas–Doimo	s.t.
5	Jürgen Roelandts (BEL)	Silence–Lotto	s.t.
6	Christopher Sutton (AUS)	Garmin–Slipstream	s.t.
7	Igor Abakoumov (BEL)	ISD–NERI	s.t.
8	Graeme Brown (AUS)	Rabobank	s.t.
9	Maciej Paterski (POL)	Team Poland Bank BGŻ	s.t.
10	Steve Chainel (FRA)	Bbox Bouygues Telecom	s.t.

General Classification after Stage 1

	Rider	Team	Time
1	Borut Božič (SLO)	Vacansoleil	2h 12' 56"
2	David Loosli (SWI)	Lampre–NGC	+ 1"
3	André Greipel (GER)	Team Columbia–HTC	+ 4"
4	Błażej Janiaczyk (POL)	Team Poland Bank BGŻ	+ 4"
5	Francesco Gavazzi (ITA)	Lampre–NGC	+ 6"
6	Wim De Vocht (BEL)	Vacansoleil	+ 9"
7	Jason McCartney (USA)	Team Saxo Bank	+ 9"
8	Sergio De Lis (ESP)	Euskaltel–Euskadi	+ 9"
9	Jacopo Guarnieri (ITA)	Liquigas–Doimo	+ 10"
10	Jürgen Roelandts (BEL)	Silence–Lotto	+ 10"

=== Stage 2 ===
3 August 2009 – Serock to Białystok, 219.1 km

This stage was very flat, with only a fourth-category climb near the end. There was a three-lap, 6.5 km circuit at the finish.

Stage 2 Result

	Rider	Team	Time
1	Angelo Furlan (ITA)	Lampre–NGC	4h 57' 25"
2	Jürgen Roelandts (BEL)	Silence–Lotto	s.t.
3	Juan José Haedo (ARG)	Team Saxo Bank	s.t.
4	Alexandre Usov (BLR)	Cofidis	s.t.
5	Graeme Brown (AUS)	Rabobank	s.t.
6	André Greipel (GER)	Team Columbia–HTC	s.t.
7	Robert Förster (GER)	Team Milram	s.t.
8	Sébastien Turgot (FRA)	Bbox Bouygues Telecom	s.t.
9	Hervé Duclos Lassalle (FRA)	Cofidis	s.t.
10	Aitor Galdos (ESP)	Euskaltel–Euskadi	s.t.

General Classification after Stage 2

	Rider	Team	Time
1	Borut Božič (SLO)	Vacansoleil	7h 10' 11"
2	Angelo Furlan (ITA)	Lampre–NGC	+ 0"
3	David Loosli (SWI)	Lampre–NGC	+ 1"
4	Jürgen Roelandts (BEL)	Silence–Lotto	+ 4"
5	André Greipel (GER)	Team Columbia–HTC	+ 4"
6	Błażej Janiaczyk (POL)	Team Poland Bank BGŻ	+ 4"
7	Bartłomiej Matysiak (POL)	Team Poland Bank BGŻ	+ 4"
8	Dominik Roels (GER)	Team Milram	+ 5"
9	Juan José Haedo (ARG)	Team Saxo Bank	+ 6"
10	Francesco Gavazzi (ITA)	Lampre–NGC	+ 6"

=== Stage 3 ===
4 August 2009 – Bielsk Podlaski to Lublin, 225.1 km

This course is mostly flat, though it becomes bumpy at the end. The 4.6 km finishing circuit includes multiple passes over a third-category climb.

Stage 3 Result

	Rider	Team	Time
1	Jacopo Guarnieri (ITA)	Liquigas–Doimo	5h 22' 31"
2	Allan Davis (AUS)	Quick-Step	s.t.
3	André Greipel (GER)	Team Columbia–HTC	s.t.
4	Danilo Napolitano (ITA)	Team Katusha	s.t.
5	Igor Abakoumov (BEL)	ISD–NERI	s.t.
6	Jürgen Roelandts (BEL)	Silence–Lotto	s.t.
7	Juan José Haedo (ARG)	Team Saxo Bank	s.t.
8	Maciej Paterski (POL)	Team Poland Bank BGŻ	s.t.
9	Graeme Brown (AUS)	Rabobank	s.t.
10	Aitor Galdos (ESP)	Euskaltel–Euskadi	s.t.

General Classification after Stage 3

	Rider	Team	Time
1	André Greipel (GER)	Team Columbia–HTC	12h 32' 42"
2	Jacopo Guarnieri (ITA)	Liquigas–Doimo	+ 0"
3	Borut Božič (SLO)	Vacansoleil	+ 0"
4	Angelo Furlan (ITA)	Lampre–NGC	+ 0"
5	David Loosli (SWI)	Lampre–NGC	+ 1"
6	László Bodrogi (FRA)	Team Katusha	+ 1"
7	Björn Schröder (GER)	Team Milram	+ 2"
8	Olivier Kaisen (BEL)	Silence–Lotto	+ 3"
9	Jürgen Roelandts (BEL)	Silence–Lotto	+ 4"
10	Bartłomiej Matysiak (POL)	Team Poland Bank BGŻ	+ 4"

=== Stage 4 ===
5 August 2009 – Nałęczów to Rzeszów, 239.7 km

In a chaotic bunch sprint, Edvald Boasson Hagen led out teammate André Greipel. While Greipel and Quick-Step sprinter Allan Davis grappled for his wheel, Boasson Hagen led on to take the win. Greipel was later relegated, and lost both the yellow and blue jersey to Jürgen Roelandts.

This course has a sloping profile, with two categorized climbs in the second half of the stage as well as an uncategorized hill coming after about 40 km. There is a three-lap finishing circuit again on this stage; it is 5.9 km long and flat.

Stage 4 Result

	Rider	Team	Time
1	Edvald Boasson Hagen (NOR)	Team Columbia–HTC	5h 25' 55"
2	Jürgen Roelandts (BEL)	Silence–Lotto	s.t.
3	Danilo Napolitano (ITA)	Team Katusha	s.t.
4	Steve Chainel (FRA)	Bbox Bouygues Telecom	s.t.
5	Igor Abakoumov (BEL)	ISD–NERI	s.t.
6	Robert Förster (GER)	Team Milram	s.t.
7	Graeme Brown (AUS)	Rabobank	s.t.
8	Francesco Gavazzi (ITA)	Lampre–NGC	s.t.
9	Sébastien Chavanel (FRA)	Française des Jeux	s.t.
10	Michał Gołaś (POL)	Vacansoleil	s.t.

General Classification after Stage 4

	Rider	Team	Time
1	Jürgen Roelandts (BEL)	Silence–Lotto	17h 58' 31"
2	Borut Božič (SLO)	Vacansoleil	+ 6"
3	Jacopo Guarnieri (ITA)	Liquigas–Doimo	+ 6"
4	Angelo Furlan (ITA)	Lampre–NGC	+ 6"
5	André Greipel (GER)	Team Columbia–HTC	+ 6"
6	Edvald Boasson Hagen (NOR)	Team Columbia–HTC	+ 6"
7	David Loosli (SWI)	Lampre–NGC	+ 7"
8	László Bodrogi (FRA)	Team Katusha	+ 7"
9	Björn Schröder (GER)	Team Milram	+ 8"
10	Olivier Kaisen (BEL)	Silence–Lotto	+ 9"

=== Stage 5 ===
6 August 2009 – Strzyżów to Krynica-Zdrój, 171.5 km

This is a high mountain stage, with a first-category climb coming after 105 km. There are two categorized climbs visited repeatedly in the four-lap 14.8 km finishing circuit, with mountains classification points taken for the first pass over them.

Stage 5 Result

	Rider	Team	Time
1	Alessandro Ballan (ITA)	Lampre–NGC	3h 48' 23"
2	Daniel Moreno (ESP)	Caisse d'Epargne	s.t.
3	Pieter Weening (NED)	Rabobank	s.t.
4	Francesco Reda (ITA)	Quick-Step	s.t.
5	Marek Rutkiewicz (POL)	Team Poland Bank BGŻ	s.t.
6	Sylvester Szmyd (POL)	Liquigas–Doimo	s.t.
7	Marco Marcato (ITA)	Vacansoleil	+ 15"
8	Francesco Gavazzi (ITA)	Lampre–NGC	s.t.
9	Mauricio Ardila (COL)	Rabobank	s.t.
10	Dan Martin (IRL)	Garmin–Slipstream	s.t.

General Classification after Stage 5

	Rider	Team	Time
1	Alessandro Ballan (ITA)	Lampre–NGC	21h 47' 00"
2	Daniel Moreno (ESP)	Caisse d'Epargne	+ 4"
3	Pieter Weening (NED)	Rabobank	+ 6"
4	Francesco Reda (ITA)	Quick-Step	+ 10"
5	Marek Rutkiewicz (POL)	Team Poland Bank BGŻ	+ 10"
6	Sylvester Szmyd (POL)	Liquigas–Doimo	+ 10"
7	Jürgen Roelandts (BEL)	Silence–Lotto	+ 11"
8	Edvald Boasson Hagen (NOR)	Team Columbia–HTC	+ 15"
9	David Loosli (SWI)	Lampre–NGC	+ 16"
10	Francesco Gavazzi (ITA)	Lampre–NGC	+ 20"

=== Stage 6 ===
7 August 2009 – Krościenko nad Dunajcem to Zakopane, 162.2 km

This is the Tour de Pologne's most mountainous stage, with another mountain circuit. This circuit is four laps by 25 km, with two first-category climbs in it. There are two other first-category climbs on the course, so the course has ten first-category climbs.

Stage 6 Result

	Rider	Team	Time
1	Edvald Boasson Hagen (NOR)	Team Columbia–HTC	4h 3' 40"
2	Alessandro Ballan (ITA)	Lampre–NGC	s.t.
3	Marco Marcato (ITA)	Vacansoleil	s.t.
4	Francesco Reda (ITA)	Quick-Step	s.t.
5	Francesco Gavazzi (ITA)	Lampre–NGC	s.t.
6	Marek Rutkiewicz (POL)	Team Poland Bank BGŻ	s.t.
7	Daniel Moreno (ESP)	Caisse d'Epargne	s.t.
8	Pablo Lastras (ESP)	Caisse d'Epargne	s.t.
9	Maxim Iglinsky (KAZ)	Astana	s.t.
10	Oliver Zaugg (SUI)	Liquigas–Doimo	s.t.

General Classification after Stage 6

	Rider	Team	Time
1	Alessandro Ballan (ITA)	Lampre–NGC	25h 50' 34"
2	Daniel Moreno (ESP)	Caisse d'Epargne	+ 10"
3	Edvald Boasson Hagen (NOR)	Team Columbia–HTC	+ 11"
4	Pieter Weening (NED)	Rabobank	+ 12"
5	Francesco Reda (ITA)	Quick-Step	+ 16"
6	Marek Rutkiewicz (POL)	Team Poland Bank BGŻ	+ 16"
7	Sylvester Szmyd (POL)	Liquigas–Doimo	+ 16"
8	Francesco Gavazzi (ITA)	Lampre–NGC	+ 26"
9	David Loosli (SWI)	Lampre–NGC	+ 26"
10	Marco Marcato (ITA)	Vacansoleil	+ 27"

=== Stage 7 ===
8 August 2009 – Rabka-Zdrój to Kraków, 136.5 km

The beginning to this stage is jagged, with a second-category climb after 56 km as well as several uncategorized rises in elevation. The finish comes on a three-lap 4 km circuit which is perfectly flat.

Stage 7 Result

	Rider	Team	Time
1	André Greipel (GER)	Team Columbia–HTC	2h 55' 39"
2	Christopher Sutton (AUS)	Garmin–Slipstream	s.t.
3	Wouter Weylandt (BEL)	Quick-Step	s.t.
4	Matthew Goss (AUS)	Team Saxo Bank	s.t.
5	Matthé Pronk (NED)	Vacansoleil	s.t.
6	Danilo Napolitano (ITA)	Team Katusha	s.t.
7	Graeme Brown (AUS)	Rabobank	s.t.
8	Dominik Roels (GER)	Team Milram	s.t.
9	Timothy Gudsell (NZL)	Française des Jeux	s.t.
10	Alessandro Ballan (ITA)	Lampre–NGC	s.t.

Final General Classification

	Rider	Team	Time
1	Alessandro Ballan (ITA)	Lampre–NGC	28h 46' 13"
2	Daniel Moreno (ESP)	Caisse d'Epargne	+ 10"
3	Edvald Boasson Hagen (NOR)	Team Columbia–HTC	+ 11"
4	Pieter Weening (NED)	Rabobank	+ 12"
5	Francesco Reda (ITA)	Quick-Step	+ 16"
6	Marek Rutkiewicz (POL)	Team Poland Bank BGŻ	+ 16"
7	Sylvester Szmyd (POL)	Liquigas–Doimo	+ 16"
8	Marco Marcato (ITA)	Vacansoleil	+ 23"
9	Pablo Lastras (ESP)	Caisse d'Epargne	+ 26"
10	Francesco Gavazzi (ITA)	Lampre–NGC	+ 26"

== Category leadership table ==
Stage	Winner	General classification Żółta koszulka	Mountains classification Klasyfikacja górska	Intermediate Sprints Classification Klasyfikacja najaktywniejszych	Points classification Klasyfikacja punktowa
1	Borut Božič	Borut Božič	Błażej Janiaczyk	David Loosli	Borut Božič
2	Angelo Furlan	Borut Božič	Błażej Janiaczyk	David Loosli	Jürgen Roelandts
3	Jacopo Guarnieri	André Greipel	Błażej Janiaczyk	David Loosli	André Greipel
4	Edvald Boasson Hagen	Jürgen Roelandts	Błażej Janiaczyk	David Loosli	Jürgen Roelandts
5	Alessandro Ballan	Alessandro Ballan	Pavel Brutt	David Loosli	Jürgen Roelandts
6	Edvald Boasson Hagen	Alessandro Ballan	Marek Rutkiewicz	David Loosli	Jürgen Roelandts
7	André Greipel	Alessandro Ballan	Marek Rutkiewicz	David Loosli	Jürgen Roelandts
Final		Alessandro Ballan	Marek Rutkiewicz	David Loosli	Jürgen Roelandts
