= José Alberto Benítez =

Spanish cyclist (born 1981)

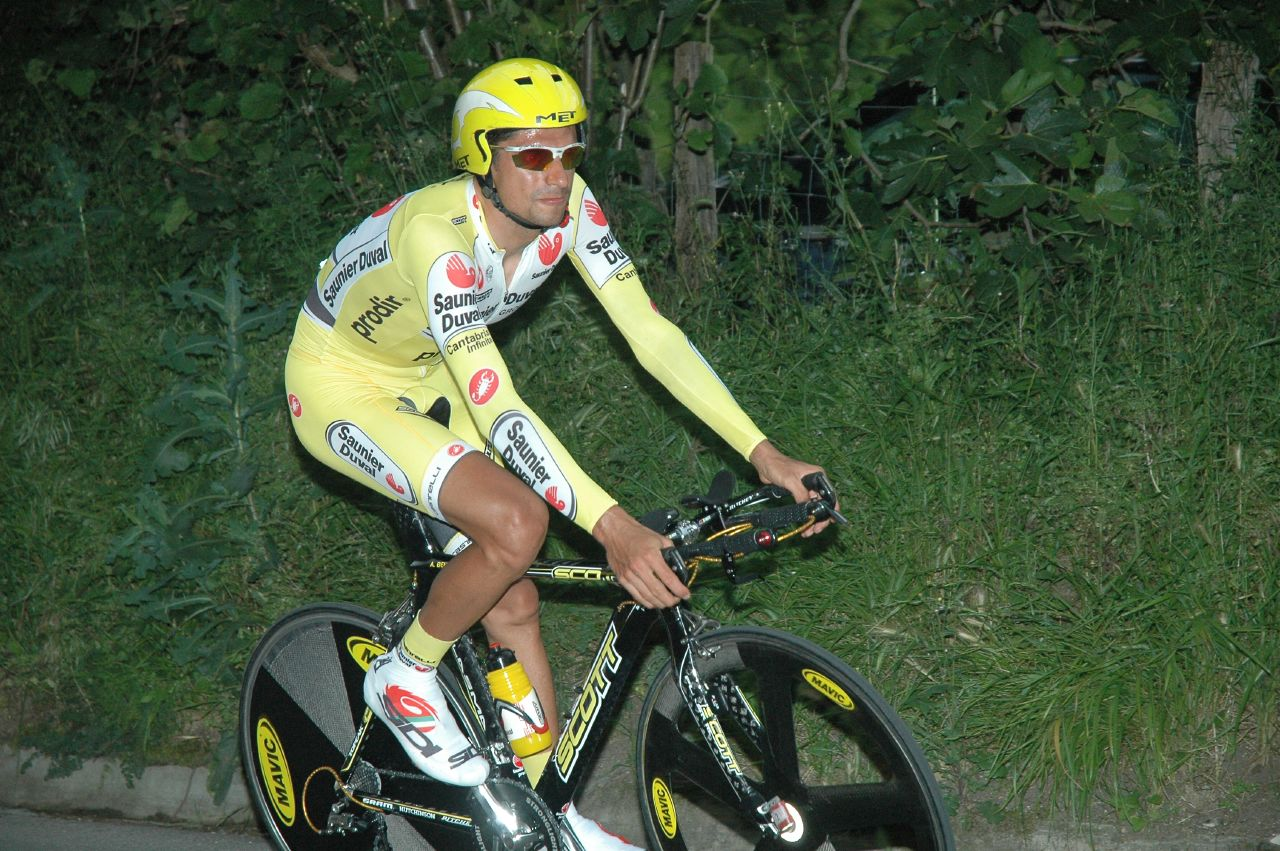

Personal information
- Full name: José Alberto Benítez Román
- Born: 14 November 1981 (age 44)
- Height: 1.80 m (5 ft 11 in)
- Weight: 64 kg (141 lb)

Cycling career
- Sport: Cycling
- Current team: Retired
- Discipline: Road
- Role: Rider

Amateur teams
- 2001–2004: Saunier Duval–Mapei
- 2004: Saunier Duval–Prodir (stagiaire)
- 2005: Spiuk

Professional teams
- 2006–2010: Saunier Duval–Prodir
- 2011: Andalucía–Caja Granada

José Alberto Benítez Román (born 14 November 1981) is a Spanish former professional road bicycle racer, who competed professionally between 2006 and 2011 for the Footon–Servetto–Fuji and Andalucía–Caja Granada teams. He raced with the Spiuk continental team 2005, before turning professional with Saunier Duval–Prodir in 2006. His first major achievement was winning the mountains classification in the 2007 Vuelta a Andalucía.

== Major results ==
- Vuelta a León – 1 stage (2005)
- Vuelta a Tenerife – 1 stage (2004)
- Volta a Coruña – 1 stage (2004)
- Volta a Portugal do Futuro – 1 stage (2003)
