= André Greipel =

German road bicycle racer (born 1982)

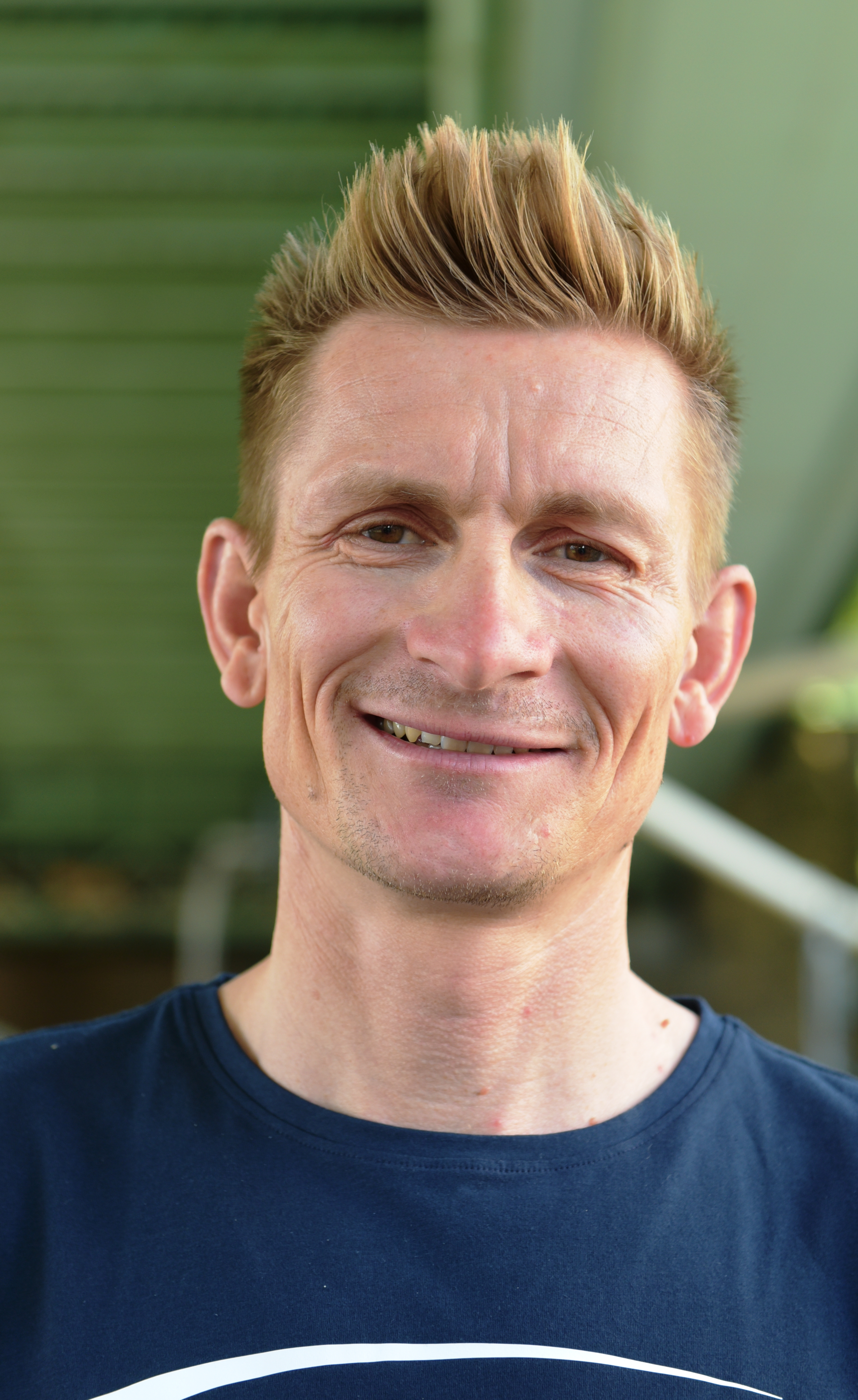
- Greipel in 2022

Personal information
- Full name: André Greipel
- Nickname: The Gorilla
- Born: 16 July 1982 (age 44) Rostock, East Germany
- Height: 1.83 m (6 ft 0 in)
- Weight: 78 kg (172 lb)

Cycling career
- Sport: Cycling
- Current team: RC Schmitter Köln; Germany (national team)
- Discipline: Road
- Role: Rider; Directeur sportif; Coach
- Rider type: Sprinter

Amateur teams
- c. 2000: Polizei SV Rostock
- 2001: Jan Ullrich Nachwuchsteam
- 2002–2004: TEAG Team Köstritzer
- 2004: SSV Gera 1990
- 2022–: RC Schmitter Köln

Professional teams
- 2005: Team Wiesenhof
- 2006–2010: T-Mobile Team
- 2011–2018: Omega Pharma–Lotto
- 2019: Arkéa–Samsic
- 2020–2021: Israel Start-Up Nation

Managerial teams
- 2022: Saris Rouvy Sauerland Team
- 2023: P&S Benotti
- 2023–: Germany (national team)

Major wins
- Grand Tours Tour de France 11 individual stages (2011–2016) Giro d'Italia 7 individual stages (2008, 2010, 2015, 2016, 2017) Vuelta a España Points classification (2009) 4 individual stages (2009) Stage races Tour Down Under (2008, 2010) Ster ZLM Toer (2015) One-day races and Classics National Road Race Championships (2013, 2014, 2016) Hamburg Cyclassics (2015) Brussels Cycling Classic (2013, 2014)
Medal record
Men's road bicycle racing
Representing Germany
World Championships
Bronze medal – third place	2011 Copenhagen	Road race

André Greipel (born 16 July 1982) is a German cyclist, who rode professionally in road bicycle racing between 2005 and 2021. Since his retirement from road racing, Greipel has worked as a directeur sportif for UCI Continental teams Saris Rouvy Sauerland Team and P&S Benotti, and in 2023, he became the national road coach for the German Cycling Federation. He also competes in masters cycling events for RC Schmitter Köln.

During his professional career, Greipel competed as a pure sprinter and took a total of 158 wins. His major successes included 22 stage victories at Grand Tours, the most by a German rider: 11 at the Tour de France, 4 at the Vuelta a España, and 7 at the Giro d'Italia, while he also won the points classification in the 2009 Vuelta a España.

A three-time winner of the German National Road Race Championships (a record shared with six other riders), Greipel also prevailed in the classic Paris–Bourges and the 2015 Vattenfall Cyclassics, and won the overall classification of the Tour Down Under in Australia, in 2008 and 2010. He is also the record holder for most stage wins at the Tour Down Under with eighteen, and is tied for most stage wins at the Benelux Tour (seven, with Tom Boonen) and the Presidential Cycling Tour of Turkey (eleven, with Mark Cavendish).

== Career ==
Greipel was born in Rostock, East Germany. He rode for TEAG Team Köstritzer at under-23 level between 2002 and 2004, winning the Grand Prix de Waregem in 2003, and stages of the Thüringen Rundfahrt der U23 in both 2003 and 2004.

=== Team Wiesenhof (2005) ===
Greipel turned professional as part of Team Wiesenhof, a UCI Professional Continental team, in 2005. Having placed second and third on stages earlier in the race, Greipel took his first professional victory at the Danmark Rundt, winning the final stage of the race in Frederiksberg. Before the end of the season, Greipel took fourth-place finishes at the Memorial Rik Van Steenbergen and the Rund um die Nürnberger Altstadt.

=== T-Mobile Team (2006–2010) ===
==== 2006–2007 ====
In September 2005, Greipel signed an initial one-year contract with the T-Mobile Team, a UCI ProTeam, for the 2006 season. He took his first wins for the team at April's Rheinland-Pfalz Rundfahrt; he won the opening stage of the race, sprinting instead of the team's designated sprinter Olaf Pollack, before adding a second victory on stage four, leading Pollack home in a 1–2 finish. Later in the season, Greipel rode his first Grand Tour at the Vuelta a España, where he finished second to Thor Hushovd on the sixth stage, before withdrawing from the race during the ninth stage. Having remained with the T-Mobile Team into 2007, Greipel's only victories of the season came at the Sachsen Tour in the summer, winning the opening two stages of the race. He did, however, work as a lead-out man for his teammate Gerald Ciolek for several of his victories during the year, including at the Deutschland Tour.

==== 2008 ====
Greipel started the 2008 season at the Tour Down Under, as part of the now-renamed Team High Road. Having won the pre-race Down Under Classic criterium and the race's second stage, Greipel then won the final three stages to win the race overall by fifteen seconds, ahead of Allan Davis, having not expected to feature in the general classification mix. He also prevailed in the points classification by four points from Davis, as he became the first leader of the UCI ProTour overall standings. After finishing third at Nokere Koerse, Greipel made his début at the Giro d'Italia and he took his first Grand Tour stage victory on stage seventeen, leading home teammate Mark Cavendish in Locarno.

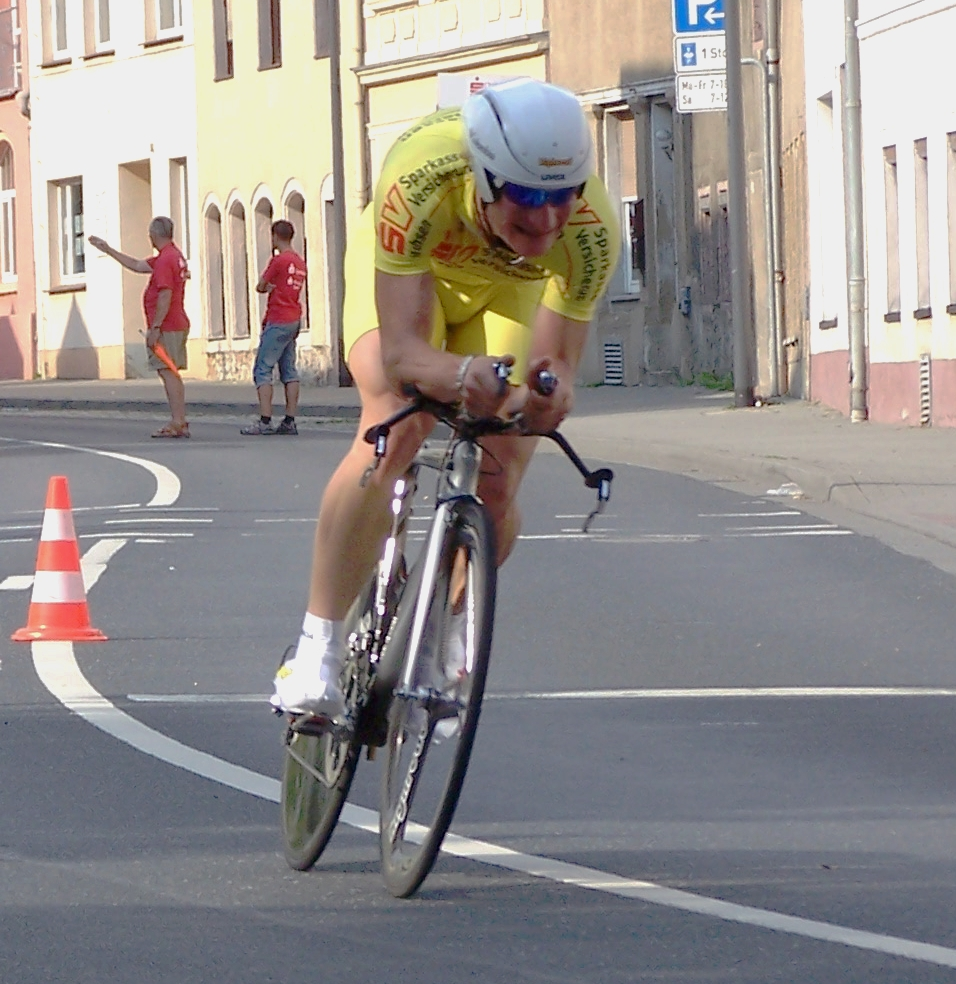
Greipel at the 2008 Sachsen Tour, where he won two stages

In July, Greipel won a stage and the points classification at the Tour of Austria, before winning two stages at the Sachsen Tour. The following month, he won a stage at both the Eneco Tour – where he held the race lead until the final individual time trial stage – and the Deutschland Tour. Before the end of the season, Greipel took three further victories in bunch sprints – winning the Rund um die Nürnberger Altstadt, the Kampioenschap van Vlaanderen, and the Münsterland Giro.

==== 2009 ====
Greipel took the opening stage victory at the Tour Down Under in January, but withdrew from the race two days later, having collided with a stationary police motorcycle during the third stage, suffering a shoulder injury which required surgery and three months of rehabilitation. He returned to racing at the Four Days of Dunkirk in May, leading the race overall, winning the final stage and the points classification. Greipel then won three stages and the points classification at the Bayern Rundfahrt, before consecutive one-day victories in early June at the Neuseen Classics and the Philadelphia International Championship. He also won three stages and the points classification at a further two races – the Ster Elektrotoer and the Tour of Austria – but was not selected for Team Columbia–HTC's squad at the Tour de France.

Prior to the Vuelta a España, Greipel took a stage victory at both the Sachsen Tour and the Tour de Pologne. Greipel led Team Columbia–HTC at the Vuelta a España, in the absence of teammate Mark Cavendish. He missed on a stage win on stage three, having been separated from his final lead-out rider Greg Henderson, who went on to win the sprint in Venlo. Greipel then won the next two stages, taking the lead in both the points classification and the general classification. Greipel ceded the overall lead to Fabian Cancellara following the stage seven individual time trial, but maintained the green jersey until stage thirteen, when Alejandro Valverde took the lead in the points classification due to a points penalty for Greipel. Greipel took his third stage victory on stage sixteen to retake the green jersey, which he would hold for the remainder of the race, and a fourth stage win came on the final day, winning the ceremonial circuit stage in Madrid. He finished 2009 with his 20th win of the season at Paris–Bourges, with only Cavendish taking more victories during the year.

==== 2010 ====
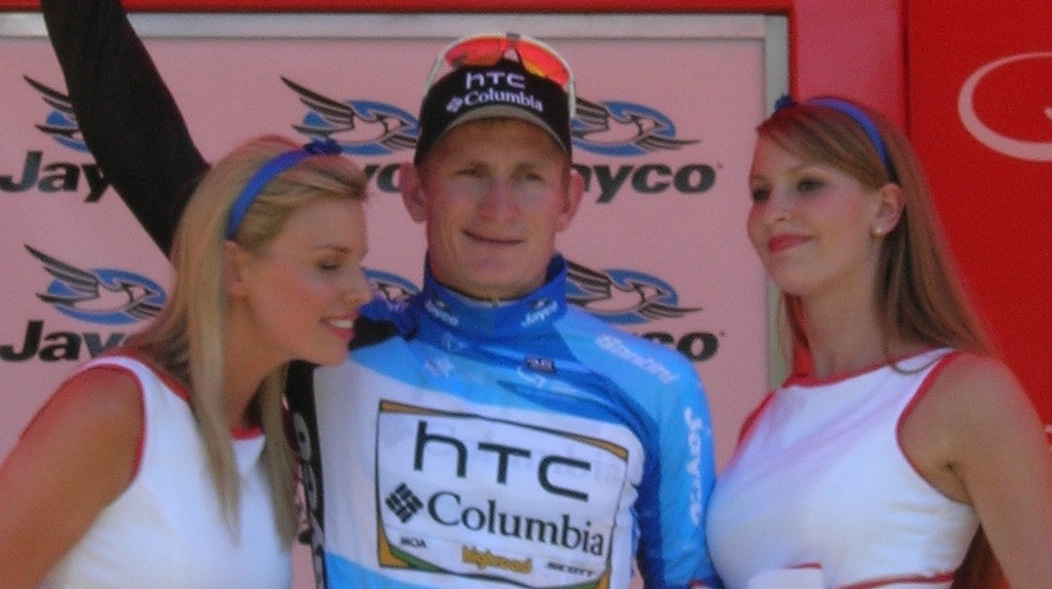
Greipel (centre) at the 2010 Tour Down Under, which he won

Greipel started the 2010 season with his second overall victory at the Tour Down Under, also winning three stages and the points classification. Greipel won the Trofeo Magaluf–Palmanova, held as part of the Vuelta a Mallorca one-day races, before winning a stage and the points classification at the Volta ao Algarve. In April, Greipel won five stages at the Tour of Turkey, including the 5.8-kilometre (3.6-mile) prologue individual time trial. He finished eighth overall and earned the points classification jersey. He won stage 18 at May's Giro d'Italia, but failed to start the following stage. Having won the points classification at the Ster Elektrotoer, Greipel then won two stages at the Tour of Austria (also winning the points classification), the Tour de Pologne, and the Eneco Tour. He concluded the season with three stage victories at the Tour of Britain, and was named German Male Cyclist of the Year (German: Radsportler des Jahres für Männer) in December.

=== Omega Pharma–Lotto (2011–2018) ===
In August 2010, Greipel signed with Omega Pharma–Lotto for the 2011 season, with four of his Team HTC–Columbia teammates later joining him at the team.

==== 2011 ====
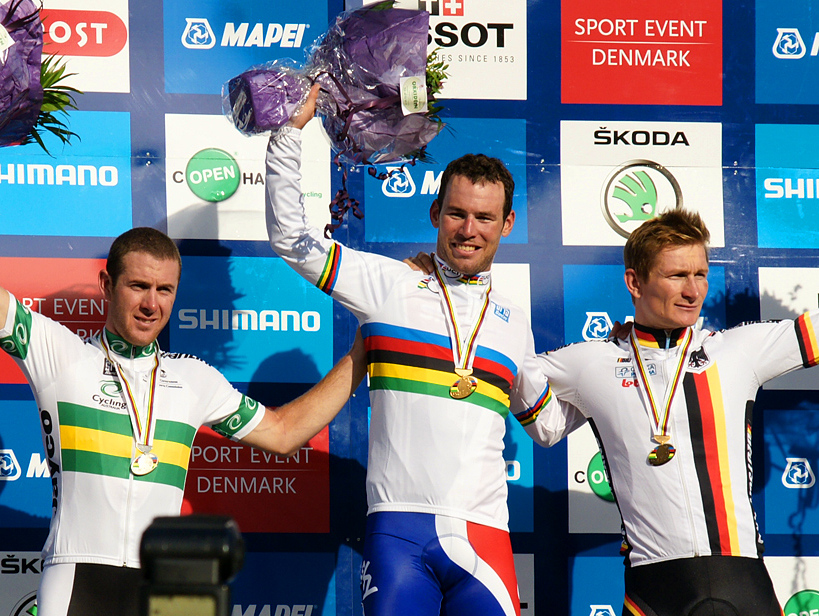
Greipel (right) won the bronze medal in the road race at the 2011 UCI Road World Championships, behind Mark Cavendish (centre) and Matthew Goss (left)

Greipel made his first start with the team at January's Tour Down Under, but failed to win a stage for the first time; he took his first victory with the team the following month, when he won the fourth stage of the Volta ao Algarve. Over the rest of the spring, Greipel took a stage win at both the Three Days of De Panne and the Tour of Turkey, as well as two stage wins and the points classification at the Tour of Belgium. Greipel then made his début at the Tour de France, as the designated sprinter for Omega Pharma–Lotto. On stage ten, Greipel took his first stage win, inching out Mark Cavendish in a bunch sprint in Carmaux. He was in contention for a second consecutive stage win the following day, but was beaten to the line in Lavaur by Cavendish. Following the Tour de France, Greipel took two consecutive stage wins at the Eneco Tour, before second-place finishes at the Memorial Rik Van Steenbergen and Kampioenschap van Vlaanderen one-day races in Belgium. He was team captain for Germany going into the road race at the UCI Road World Championships in Copenhagen, but could only finish third in the bunch sprint, behind his former Team HTC–Columbia teammates Cavendish and Matthew Goss.

==== 2012 ====
Greipel started the season with three stage victories at the Tour Down Under in January, and a further two stage wins at the Tour of Oman in February. He then went two months without a victory, not winning again until April's Tour of Turkey, with a sprint win in Antalya on stage two. The following month, Greipel then won the first three stages of the Tour of Belgium, winning the points classification as a result. Before the Tour de France, Greipel won two stages and the points classification at the Tour de Luxembourg, the ProRace Berlin in a sprint finish, and the second stage of the Ster ZLM Toer.

At the Tour de France, Greipel and his Lotto–Belisol teammates had high hopes for stage victories. He was edged out for victory by Mark Cavendish on stage 2, despite admitting he had a "nearly perfect lead out train". On stage 4, Greipel avoided a crash with around 3 kilometres (1.9 miles) remaining – which took down other riders including Cavendish – and won the sprint in Rouen by beating Alessandro Petacchi and Tom Veelers. Greipel took a second consecutive win on stage 5, winning the sprint in Saint-Quentin after the breakaway was caught inside the final kilometre of the stage. Having missed out on a third consecutive stage win with a second-place finish – to Peter Sagan – in Metz on stage 6, Greipel did ultimately take a third stage win on stage 13, out-sprinting Sagan for the victory. He was the closest challenger to Sagan in the points classification, albeit more than 100 points in arrears.

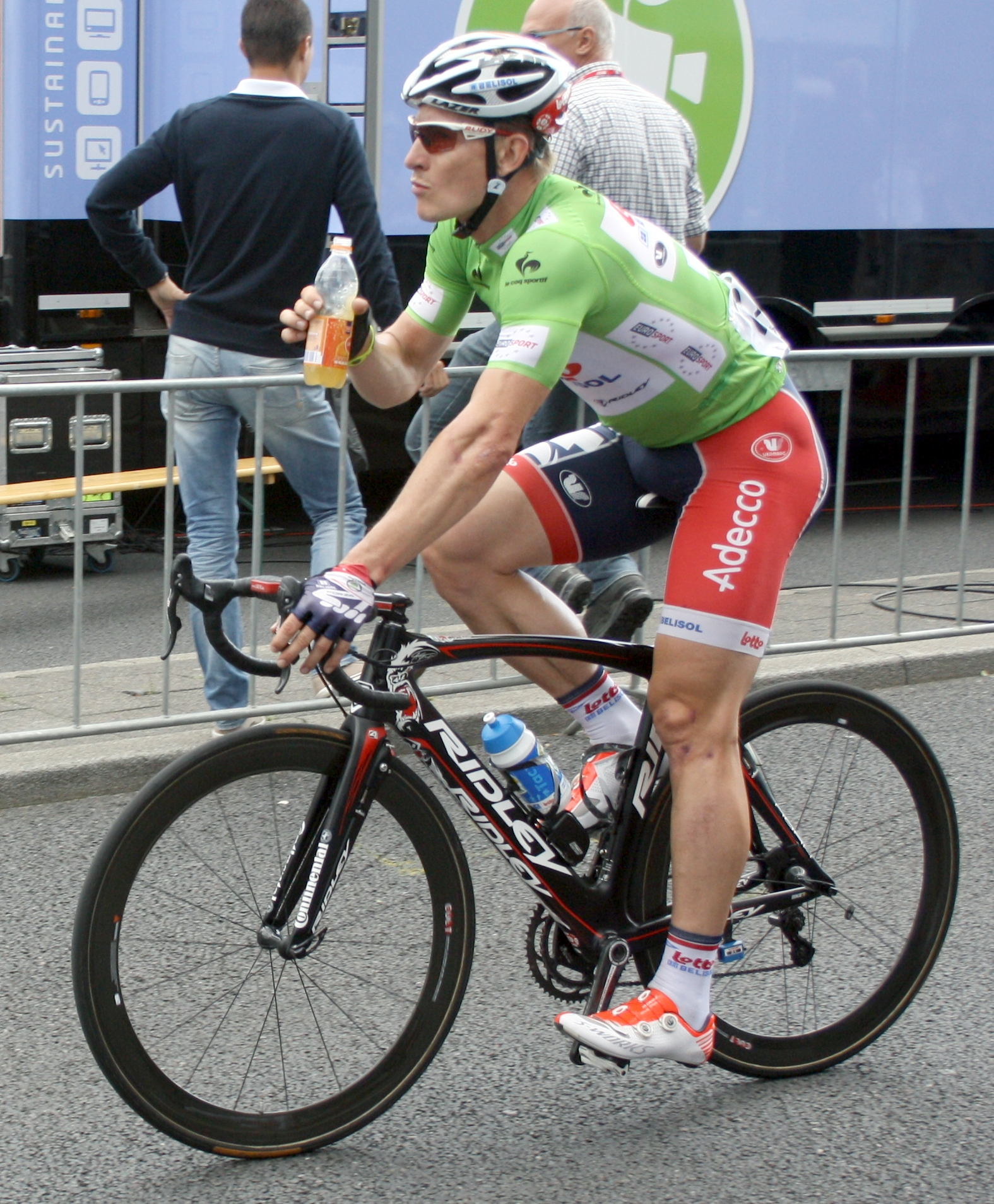
Greipel at the 2012 World Ports Classic

Greipel was seen to be one of the favourites for the road race at the Olympics in London, but he did not feature towards the medal places. He then placed second to Arnaud Démare in August's Vattenfall Cyclassics, the only UCI World Tour event disputed in Germany. He stated that the scorching heat did not help matters in the 245.6-kilometre (152.6-mile) race, and that his "engine had some cooling problems". He also announced after the race that he would not participate in the road race at the UCI Road World Championships in Limburg, citing the course as "too difficult". He took three further victories over the remainder of the season – winning the first two stages of the Danmark Rundt, as well as a victory in the Grand Prix Impanis-Van Petegem one-day race – while also placing second overall at the World Ports Classic, finishing second on both stages. Following the end of the season, Greipel welcomed the investigation of Lance Armstrong by the United States Anti-Doping Agency (USADA), stating that "the fight against cheating and the falsely-earned successes must absolutely be continued".

==== 2013 ====
Greipel started the 2013 campaign in Australia by winning the Down Under Classic for a record third time, before going on to win three stages at the Tour Down Under – the second of which, his thirteenth overall, took him past Robbie McEwen's previous record for most stage victories at the Tour Down Under. In his next start, Greipel then won the opening stage at the Tour Méditerranéen. While racing at the Tour of Turkey, Greipel's grandmother died; having spoken to other family members, he elected to continue in the race, and went on to win stages four and five as well as the points classification. He then won two consecutive stages and the points classification in his next stage race, the Tour of Belgium.

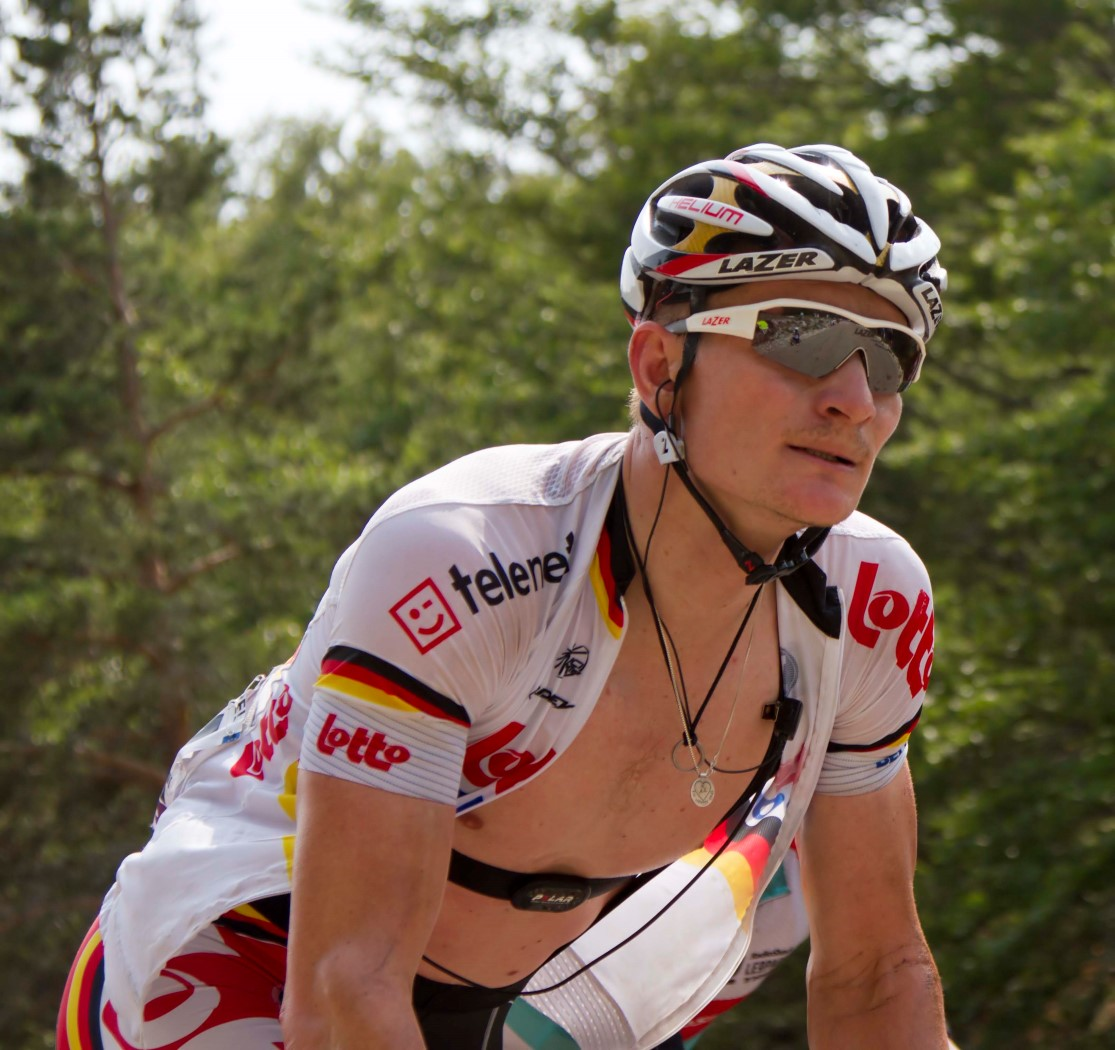
Greipel at the 2013 Tour de France, where he wore the German national road race champion's jersey for the first time

In June, Greipel won the Ronde van Zeeland Seaports, then finished third at the ProRace Berlin before a second-place overall finish to Lars Boom at the Ster ZLM Toer, winning the points classification. At the end of the month, Greipel won the German National Road Race Championships for the first time in his career ahead of Gerald Ciolek and John Degenkolb in a sprint, having been part of an eighteen-rider leading group on a rainy day in Wangen im Allgäu. His first race following the national title success was at the Tour de France, where he won the sixth stage into Montpellier. Prior to the end of the season, Greipel won the fourth stage of the Eneco Tour and the Brussels Cycling Classic one-day race, while also finishing as runner-up in the Vattenfall Cyclassics (to Degenkolb) and the Grand Prix de Fourmies (to Nacer Bouhanni). His thirteen victories was the most for any Lotto–Belisol rider during the 2013 season.

==== 2014 ====
Greipel started his season in Australia with two stage victories at January's Tour Down Under, before winning the fifth stage of February's Tour of Qatar, and a further three stages and the points classification at the Tour of Oman the same month. He crashed heavily in the finale of Gent–Wevelgem with Tyler Farrar at the end of March, dislocating his collarbone and tearing off the bone's ligaments. He was successfully operated upon the same evening, but missed a month of racing, ultimately returning to the peloton at the Tour of Turkey. Having gone winless at the Tour of Turkey, Greipel then took at least one stage victory at each of his next four stage race starts before the Tour de France – the World Ports Classic, the Tour of Belgium, the Tour de Luxembourg (two stages, the second being a solo victory), and the Ster ZLM Toer.

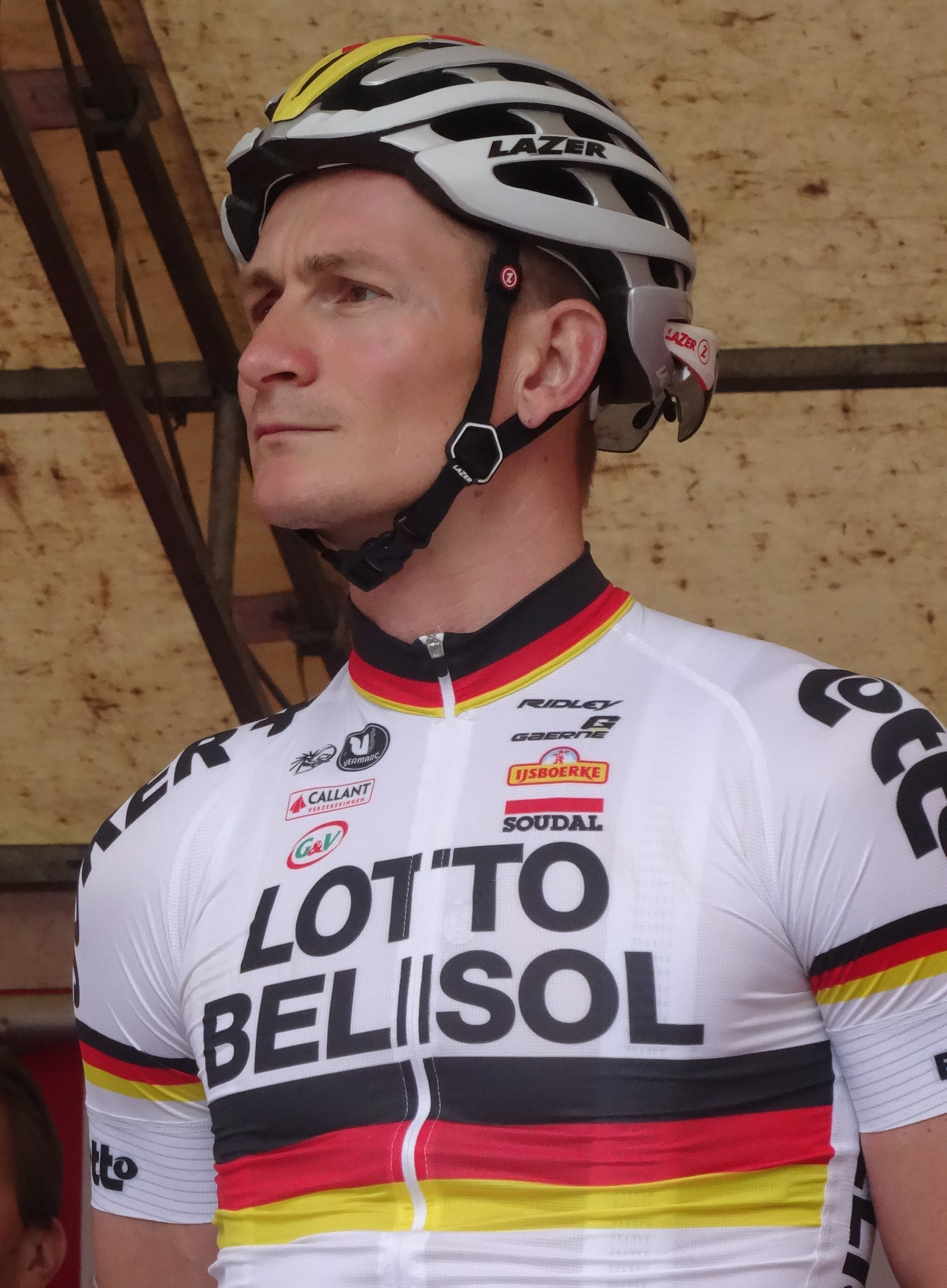
Greipel won his second consecutive German National Road Race Championships title in 2014, and won the Grote Prijs Jef Scherens in the national champion's jersey

Greipel also became the first rider to win consecutive German National Road Race Championships titles since Fabian Wegmann in 2007 and 2008, winning the sprint finish ahead of John Degenkolb and Phil Bauhaus. At the Tour de France, Greipel won a stage for the fourth successive year, winning the sixth stage of the race in Reims; he out-sprinted Alexander Kristoff and Samuel Dumoulin, after Arnaud Démare and Marcel Kittel had earlier been dropped from the peloton. Following the Tour de France, Greipel took three one-day victories before the end of the season – winning the Brussels Cycling Classic for the second year in a row, the Grote Prijs Jef Scherens, and the Münsterland Giro. He ended the season with 16 wins, which was the most for any male rider.

==== 2015 ====
Having finished second to Matteo Pelucchi at the Trofeo Playa de Palma–Palma, held as part of the Vuelta a Mallorca one-day races, Greipel won stages at both the Volta ao Algarve and Paris–Nice, dedicating the latter victory to his mother, who he said was "having a very hard time at the moment". In April, he was denied his third victory of the season at the Three Days of De Panne, losing out to Alexander Kristoff by 5 millimetres (0.20 inches) in the bunch sprint on stage 3a. His next win came on the fourth stage of the Tour of Turkey, in a sprint of a reduced group, after some of his main rivals were dropped on a climb close to the finish. He rode the Giro d'Italia for the first time since 2010, winning stage 6 ahead of Pelucchi and Sacha Modolo, before withdrawing ahead of stage 14. In June, Greipel won two stages and the points classification at the Tour de Luxembourg, before doing the same at the Ster ZLM Toer, where he also won the general classification, 16 seconds clear of the next closest competitor.

Unable to defend his German National Road Race Championships title, Greipel took two stage victories in the opening week of the Tour de France – he won a very windy stage 2 in the Netherlands, ahead of Peter Sagan, Mark Cavendish and Fabian Cancellara in a bunch sprint, before winning the first stage fully on French soil, stage 5, ahead of Sagan and Cavendish in the sprint. He won further bunch sprints, on stages 15 (in Valence) and 21 (on the Champs-Élysées), but Sagan prevailed in the points classification by 66 points from Greipel. Following the Tour de France, Greipel won a stage and the points classification at the Eneco Tour, before taking the victory in the Vattenfall Cyclassics, his first one-day victory on the UCI World Tour. He concluded his season with a stage victory at the Tour of Britain, his 16th win of the year.

==== 2016 ====
Greipel won two events at the Vuelta a Mallorca one-day races to start the season – winning the Trofeo Felanitx–Ses Salines–Campos–Porreres and the Trofeo Playa de Palma–Palma events. After a third-place finish at the Scheldeprijs, Greipel's next victory came at the Presidential Tour of Turkey in April, winning the third stage of his final warm-up race before the Giro d'Italia. At the Giro d'Italia, Greipel won two stages in the first week, winning stages five and seven to move into the lead of the points classification. Wearing the red jersey of classification leader, Greipel added a third stage win on stage twelve into Bibione, but withdrew from the race following this. Following the Giro d'Italia, Greipel won a stage of the Tour de Luxembourg, and finished second to Dylan Groenewegen at the centenary edition of the Rund um Köln.

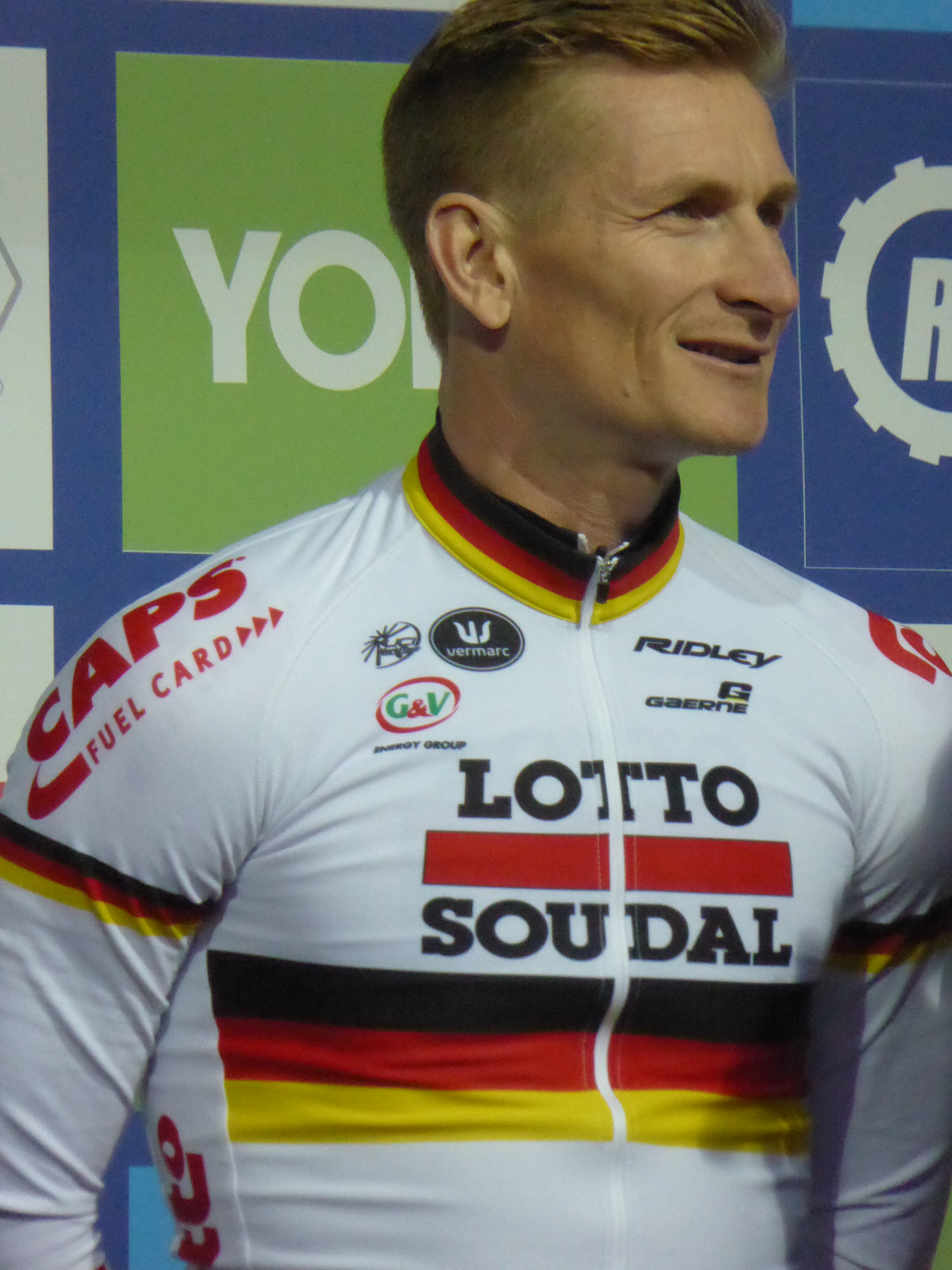
Greipel, wearing the German national road race champion's jersey, at the 2016 Tour of Britain

At the end of June, Greipel won a record-equalling third German National Road Race Championships title, beating Max Walscheid and Marcel Kittel in a bunch sprint in Erfurt. He won a stage at the Tour de France for the sixth successive year, repeating his final stage victory on the Champs-Élysées from 2015. Greipel won the opening stage of September's Tour of Britain, taking a sprint victory in Castle Douglas, before ceding the race lead the following day. This was in preparation for the road race at the UCI Road World Championships the following month, which Greipel had earmarked as his main target prior to the season. Greipel led the German team, but they were caught out by crosswinds during the race, and Greipel was ultimately the team's only finisher in 42nd place.

==== 2017–2018 ====
Greipel took victory in his first start of the 2017 season, winning the Trofeo Porreres, Felanitx, Ses Salines, Campos event held as part of the Vuelta a Mallorca one-day races. He then won stages at both the Volta ao Algarve and Paris–Nice, also winning the points classification in Portugal. Greipel then recorded his first top-ten finish at one of the cycling monuments, when he finished in seventh place at Paris–Roubaix – finishing twelve seconds down on race winner Greg Van Avermaet, in the first group of chasing riders. At the Giro d'Italia, Greipel won the second stage in Sardinia; with the time bonuses he collected from this and his third place on the opening stage put him in the overall race leader's pink jersey for the first time. He ceded the overall lead to Fernando Gaviria the following day, in crosswinds that effected the third stage, and he later withdrew from the race before its final week. Thereafter, Greipel did not win another race until the inaugural Omloop Eurometropool at the end of September, which meant that Greipel's streak of twelve consecutive Grand Tour starts with at least one stage victory came to an end at the Tour de France, his best result being a second-place finish to Dylan Groenewegen on the Champs-Élysées as he sought a third consecutive stage win in Paris.

Greipel started his 2018 season in January with wins on the first and final stages of the Tour Down Under, finishing in Lyndoch and Adelaide respectively. He was forced to withdraw from the spring classics after breaking his collarbone in a crash at Milan–San Remo, but returned to competition after seven weeks at the Four Days of Dunkirk, where he took another pair of stage wins (the second being a solo victory), finishing second overall to Dimitri Claeys by one second in the general classification. Greipel then won two stages and the points classification at the Tour of Belgium, but he could not translate this form into a stage win at the Tour de France, where he was forced to withdraw from the race in the Alps, on stage twelve. Following his withdrawal, he accused Arnaud Démare of holding onto team cars in order to make a stage time limit, but later apologised. Subsequently, Lotto–Soudal announced that after eight seasons, Greipel would be leaving at the end of the season; he took a total of 95 victories during his time with the team, the last pair of which came on stages at the Tour of Britain.

=== Arkéa–Samsic (2019) ===
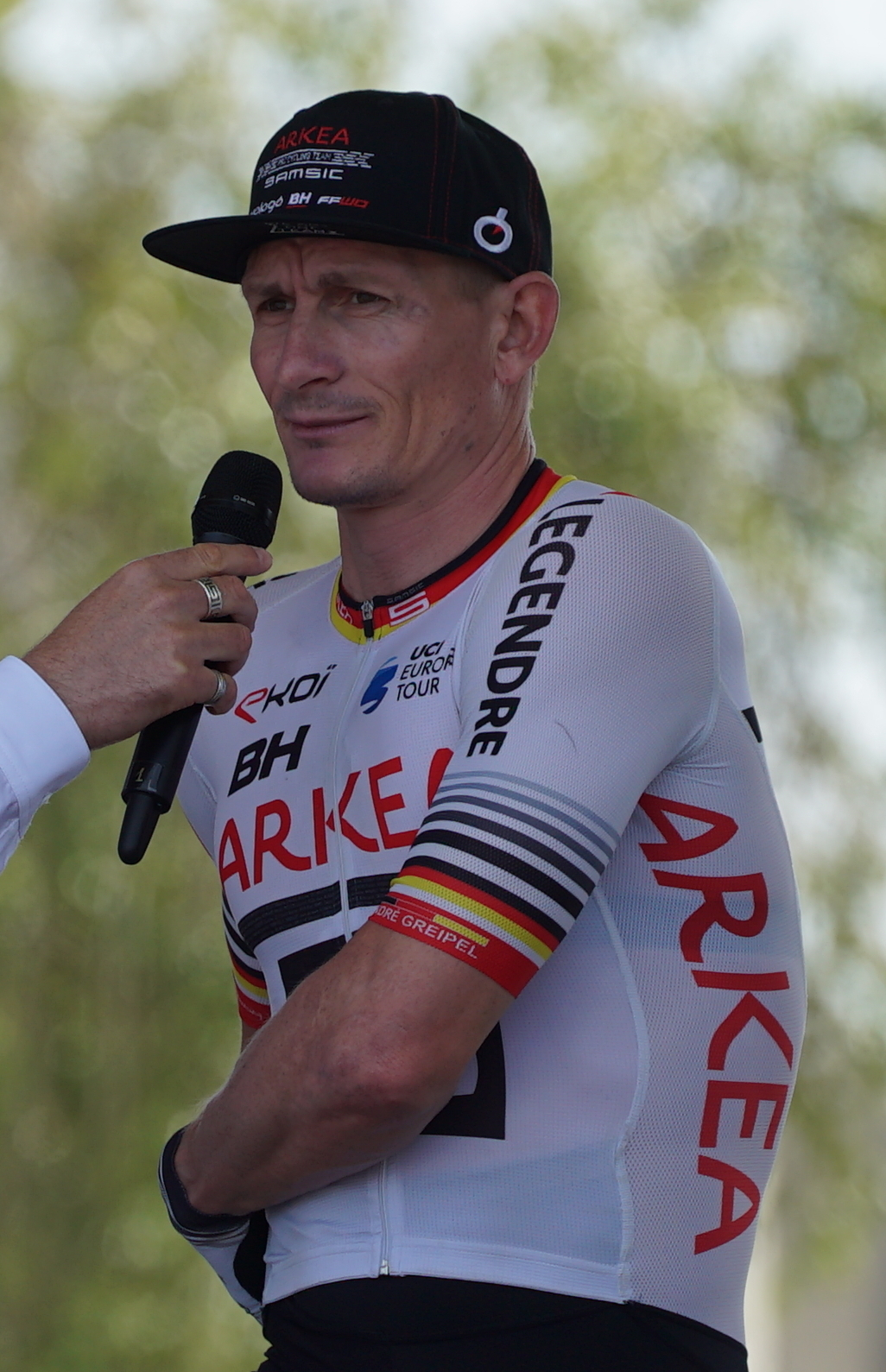
Greipel at the 2019 Tour de France

In August 2018, Greipel announced that he had signed a two-year deal with Fortuneo–Samsic, later renamed Arkéa–Samsic from 2019. Greipel made his debut for the team at La Tropicale Amissa Bongo, where he won a stage and finished third overall. This would ultimately turn out to be his only victory of the 2019 season, and his only other podium result was a second-place finish at the Grote Prijs Stad Zottegem, behind winner Piotr Havik. In October 2019 Greipel and Arkéa–Samsic announced that they had agreed to end their contract a year early, making his final appearance for the team at the Münsterland Giro. Greipel also revealed that his competitiveness was affected in the first half of the season by a bacterial disease which he suffered from for several months, recovering a fortnight before the Tour de France.

=== Israel Start-Up Nation (2020–2021) ===
In November 2019, Israel Start-Up Nation announced that they had signed Greipel for the 2020 season. He started his first season with the team in Australia, racing in the Tour Down Under, Race Torquay and the Cadel Evans Great Ocean Road Race, taking a best result of fourth place on stage four of the Tour Down Under before returning to Europe. However, in February 2020, Greipel suffered a shoulder fracture in a training crash near Cologne. The injury prevented Greipel from racing further before competition was suspended due to the COVID-19 pandemic. His best result following the COVID-19 pandemic was a sixth-place stage finish at the Tour de France.

In April 2021 Greipel stated that he would retire from cycling in 2022. The following month he took his first win in over two years at the Trofeo Alcúdia, having twice finished second in stages of the Presidential Tour of Turkey in April. He subsequently won a stage at the Vuelta a Andalucía the following week. In July, ahead of the penultimate stage of the Tour de France, Greipel announced that he would retire from competition, earlier than planned, at the end of the 2021 season. His final race was at the Münsterland Giro, finishing tenth. He finished his professional career with a total of 158 victories.

=== Post-competitive career ===
Following his retirement, Greipel was appointed race director for the Rund um Köln one-day race in February 2022. He also became a directeur sportif with UCI Continental team Saris Rouvy Sauerland Team in 2022, and later fulfilled the same role in 2023 for another UCI Continental team, P&S Benotti. In April 2023, Greipel became the national road coach for the German Cycling Federation, replacing Jens Zemke in the role. He also competes in masters cycling events, including cyclo-cross and gravel cycling, for RC Schmitter Köln.

== Personal life ==
Married with two children, Greipel lives in Hürth, close to Cologne in Germany. After his overall win at the 2008 Tour Down Under, he was nicknamed the "Gorilla" by various sports media.
