= 2002 Bayern Rundfahrt =

Race details
- Dates: 22–26 May 2002
- Stages: 6
- Distance: 900.1 km (559.3 mi)
- Winning time: 21h 31' 48"

Results
	Winner	Michael Rich (GER)
	Second	Jens Voigt (GER)
	Third	Yuriy Krivtsov (UKR)

The 2002 Bayern Rundfahrt was the 14th edition of the Bayern Rundfahrt cycle race and was held on 22–26 May 2002. The race started in Füssen and finished in Neumarkt in der Oberpfalz. The race was won by Michael Rich.

== General classification ==
Final general classification

Rank	Rider	Time
1	Michael Rich (GER)	21h 31' 48"
2	Jens Voigt (GER)	+ 25"
3	Yuriy Krivtsov (UKR)	+ 29"
4	Rolf Aldag (GER)	+ 31"
5	Aleksander Nikacevic (SRB)	+ 33"
6	Evgeni Petrov (RUS)	+ 35"
7	Christophe Edaleine (FRA)	+ 53"
8	Artur Babaitsev (RUS)	+ 58"
9	Christopher Jenner (AUS)	+ 1' 09"
10	Holger Sievers (GER)	+ 1' 11"
