= German National Time Trial Championships =

National road cycling championship in Germany

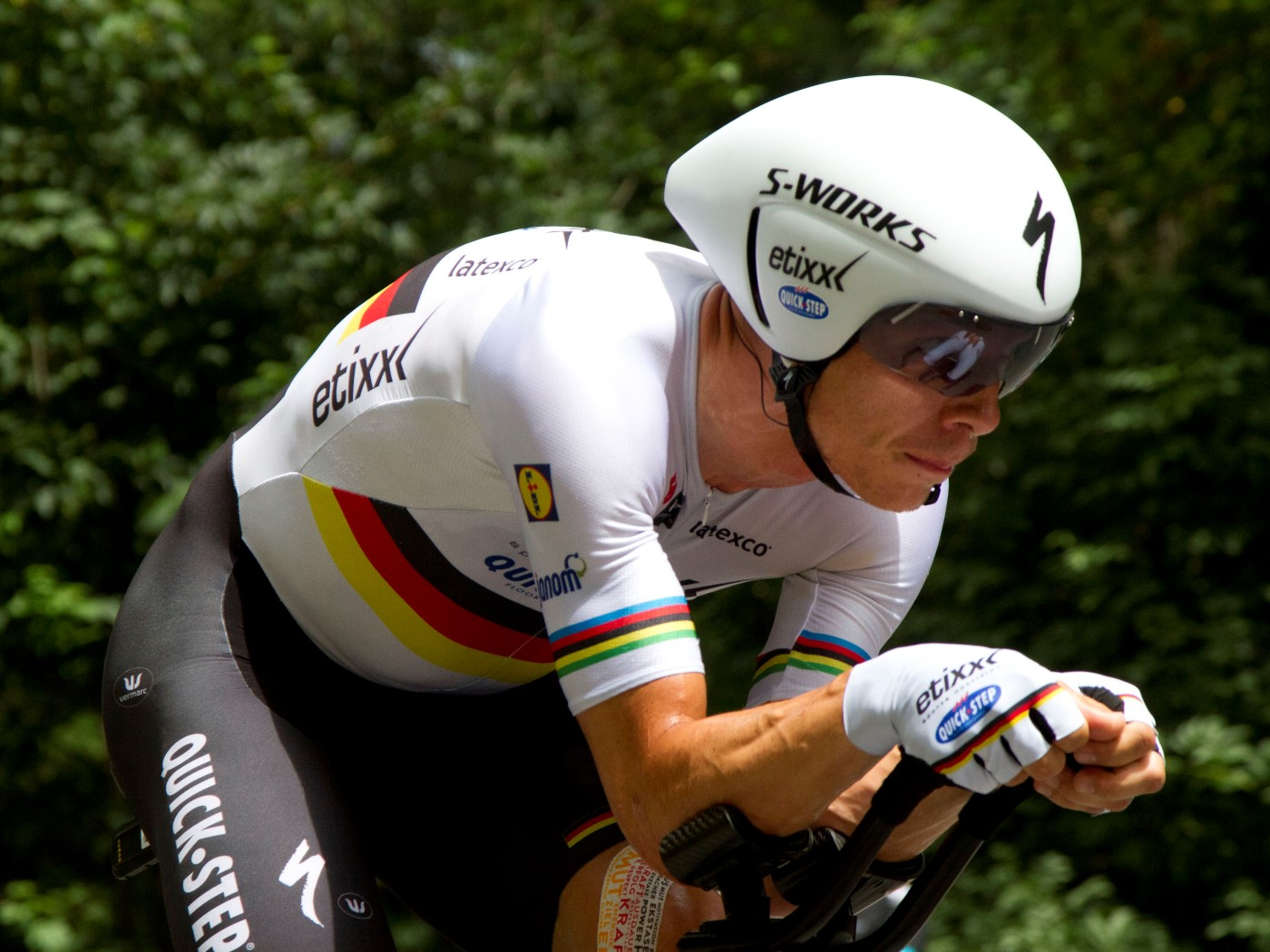
Tony Martin (pictured at the 2016 Tour de France) is the record winner of the German time trial championship, having taken the title ten times.

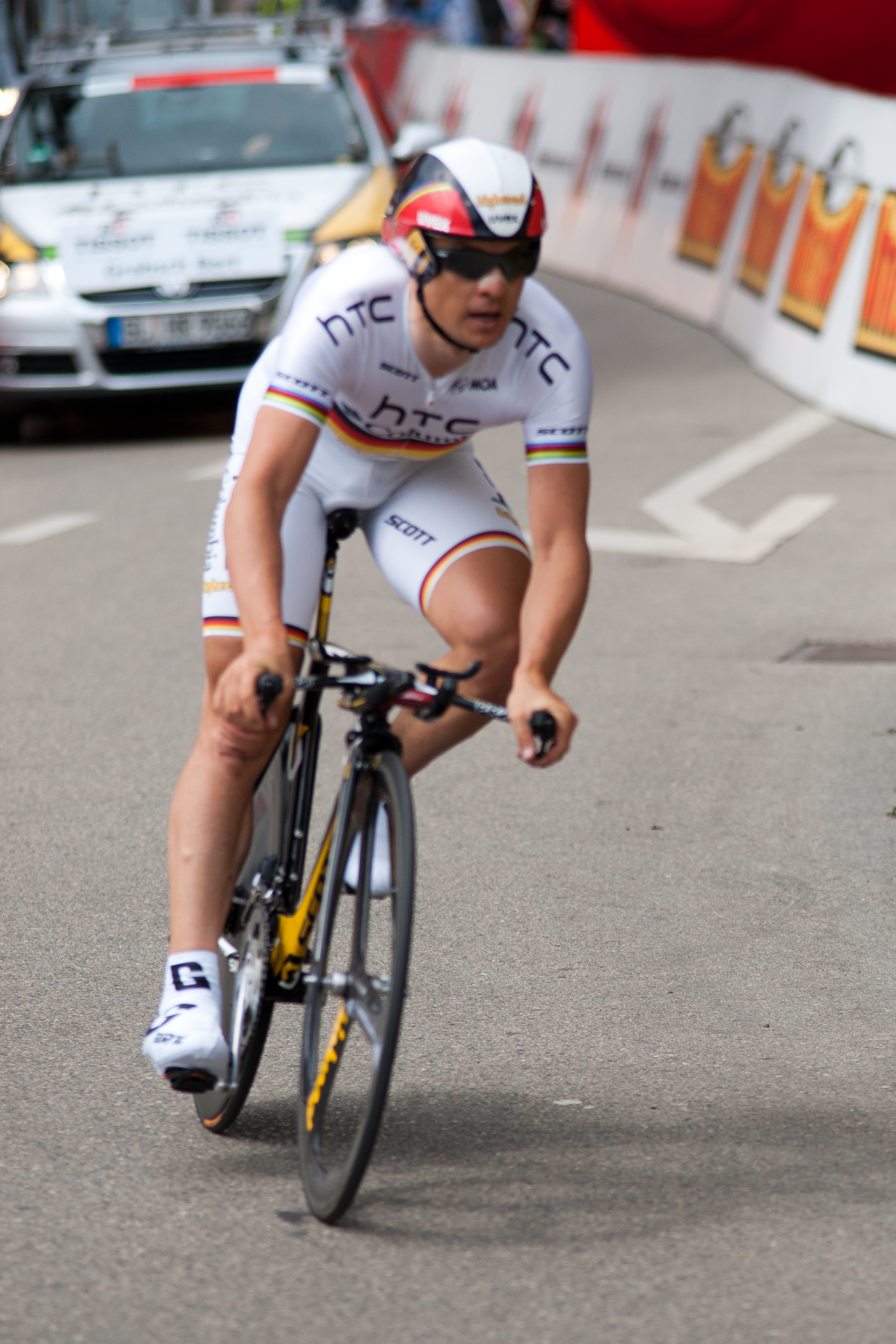
Bert Grabsch (pictured at the 2010 Tour de Romandie) won the German time trial championship four times during his career.

The German National Time Trial Championships have been held since 1994.

== Men ==
Year	Gold	Silver	Bronze
1995	Jan Ullrich	Uwe Peschel	Thomas Liese
1996	Uwe Peschel	Thomas Liese	Michael Rich
1997	Andreas Walzer	Bert Grabsch	Thomas Liese
1998	Uwe Peschel	Andreas Walzer	Thomas Liese
1999	Andreas Walzer	Olaf Pollack	Dirk Müller
2000	Michael Rich	Thomas Liese	Sebastian Lang
2001	Thomas Liese	Uwe Peschel	Andreas Walzer
2002	Uwe Peschel	Michael Rich	Jens Voigt
2003	Michael Rich	Uwe Peschel	Sebastian Lang
2004	Michael Rich	Sebastian Lang	Jens Voigt
2005	Michael Rich	Sebastian Lang	Jens Voigt
2006	Sebastian Lang	Michael Rich	Jens Voigt
2007	Bert Grabsch	Lars Teutenberg	Robert Bartko
2008	Bert Grabsch	Stefan Schumacher	Tony Martin
2009	Bert Grabsch	Tony Martin	Jens Voigt
2010	Tony Martin	Patrick Gretsch	Jens Voigt
2011	Bert Grabsch	Tony Martin	Patrick Gretsch
2012	Tony Martin	Bert Grabsch	Lars Teutenberg
2013	Tony Martin	Patrick Gretsch	Stefan Schumacher
2014	Tony Martin	Nikias Arndt	Lars Teutenberg
2015	Tony Martin	Nikias Arndt	Stefan Schumacher
2016	Tony Martin	Jasha Sütterlin	Nils Politt
2017	Tony Martin	Jasha Sütterlin	Nils Politt
2018	Tony Martin	Jasha Sütterlin	Nikias Arndt
2019	Tony Martin	Nils Politt	Jasha Sütterlin
2020	Not held due to the COVID-19 pandemic in Germany		
2021	Tony Martin	Miguel Heidemann	Max Walscheid
2022	Lennard Kämna	Jannik Steimle	Nils Politt
2023	Nils Politt	Miguel Heidemann	Max Schachmann
2024	Nils Politt	Max Schachmann	Miguel Heidemann
2025	Max Schachmann	Miguel Heidemann	Lennard Kämna
2026	Nils Politt	Max Walscheid	Jasha Sütterlin

=== U23 ===
Year	Gold	Silver	Bronze
2002	Markus Fothen	Artjom Botschkarew	Thomas Ziegler
2003	Markus Fothen	Peter Magyarosi	Andreas Schillinger
2004	Christian Müller	Paul Martens	Linus Gerdemann
2005	Paul Martens	Robert Wagner	Stefan Schäfer
2006	Tony Martin	Dominik Roels	Nikolai Schwarz
2007	Marcel Kittel	Jörg Lehmann	Stefan Schäfer
2008	Andreas Henig	Stefan Schäfer	Martin Reimer
2009	Patrick Gretsch	John Degenkolb	Martin Reimer
2010	Marcel Kittel	Michel Koch	Michael Weicht
2011	Christopher Muche	Kersten Thiele	Jakob Steigmiller
2012	Jasha Sütterlin	Harry Kraft	Jakob Steigmiller
2013	Jasha Sütterlin	Nils Politt	Yannick Gruner
2014	Nils Politt	Max Schachmann	Domenic Weinstein
2015	Lennard Kämna	Nils Politt	Nils Schomber
2016	Max Schachmann	Jan Tschernoster	Marco Mathis
2017	Patrick Haller	Julian Braun	Manuel Porzner
2018	Jasper Frahm	Max Kanter	Richard Banusch
2019	Miguel Heidemann	Florian Stork	Juri Hollmann
2020	Miguel Heidemann	Sven Redmann	Tobias Buck-Gramcko
2021	Michel Hessmann	Maurice Ballerstedt	Jon Knolle
2022	Maurice Ballerstedt	Tobias Buck-Gramcko	Hannes Wilksch
2023	Moritz Kretschy	Tim Torn Teutenberg	Ole Theiler
2024	Tim Torn Teutenberg	Niklas Behrens	Moritz Czasa
2025	Bruno Keßler	Louis Leidert	Paul Fietzke
2026	Bruno Keßler	Paul Fietzke	Ian Kings

== Women ==
Year	Gold	Silver	Bronze
1994	Vera Hohlfeld	Hanka Kupfernagel	Cordula Gruber
1995	Hanka Kupfernagel	Judith Arndt	Petra Rossner
1996	Hanka Kupfernagel	Judith Arndt	Vera Hohlfeld
1997	Hanka Kupfernagel	Judith Arndt	Ina-Yoko Teutenberg
1998	Judith Arndt	Jacqueline Brabenetz	Mandy Hampel
1999	Judith Arndt	Petra Rossner	Bettina Schöke
2000	Hanka Kupfernagel	Bettina Schöke	Ina-Yoko Teutenberg
2001	Judith Arndt	Bettina Schöke	Hanka Kupfernagel
2002	Hanka Kupfernagel	Trixi Worrack	Tina Liebig
2003	Judith Arndt	Christiane Soeder	Anke Wichmann
2004	Judith Arndt	Trixi Worrack	Petra Rossner
2005	Judith Arndt	Trixi Worrack	Madeleine Sandig
2006	Charlotte Becker	Madeleine Sandig	Ina-Yoko Teutenberg
2007	Hanka Kupfernagel	Charlotte Becker	Judith Arndt
2008	Hanka Kupfernagel	Judith Arndt	Charlotte Becker
2009	Trixi Worrack	Judith Arndt	Ina-Yoko Teutenberg
2010	Judith Arndt	Charlotte Becker	Hanka Kupfernagel
2011	Judith Arndt	Charlotte Becker	Ina-Yoko Teutenberg
2012	Judith Arndt	Trixi Worrack	Ina-Yoko Teutenberg
2013	Lisa Brennauer	Trixi Worrack	Esther Fennel
2014	Lisa Brennauer	Trixi Worrack	Charlotte Becker
2015	Mieke Kröger	Lisa Brennauer	Trixi Worrack
2016	Trixi Worrack	Stephanie Pohl	Lisa Brennauer
2017	Trixi Worrack	Lisa Brennauer	Stephanie Pohl
2018	Lisa Brennauer	Trixi Worrack	Lisa Klein
2019	Lisa Klein	Mieke Kröger	Lisa Brennauer
2020	Not held due to the COVID-19 pandemic in Germany		
2021	Lisa Brennauer	Lisa Klein	Hannah Ludwig
2022	Lisa Brennauer	Lisa Klein	Hannah Ludwig
2023	Mieke Kröger	Katharina Fox	Clara Koppenburg
2024	Mieke Kröger	Antonia Niedermaier	Lisa Klein
2025	Antonia Niedermaier	Franziska Brauße	Liane Lippert
2026	Franziska Koch	Antonia Niedermaier	Lisa Klein

=== U23 ===
Year	Gold	Silver	Bronze
2022	Ricarda Bauernfeind	Linda Riedmann	Judith Krahl
2023	Antonia Niedermaier	Linda Riedmann	Justyna Czapla
2024	Justyna Czapla	Pia Grünewald	Hannah Kunz
2025	Justyna Czapla	Linda Riedmann	Hannah Kunz
2026	Justyna Czapla	Magdalena Leis	Messane Bräutigam

== See also ==
- German National Road Race Championships
- National road cycling championships
