= 2002 Chrono des Herbiers =

Race details
- Dates: 22 October 2002
- Stages: 1
- Distance: 48.15 km (29.92 mi)
- Winning time: 59' 45"

Results
	Winner	Michael Rich (GER)
	Second	Fabian Cancellara (SUI)
	Third	Bert Roesems (BEL)

The 2002 Chrono des Herbiers was the 21st edition of the Chrono des Nations cycle race and was held on 22 October 2002. The race started and finished in Les Herbiers. The race was won by Michael Rich.

== General classification ==
Final general classification

Rank	Rider	Time
1	Michael Rich (GER)	59' 45"
2	Fabian Cancellara (SUI)	+ 8"
3	Bert Roesems (BEL)	+ 29"
4	László Bodrogi (FRA)	+ 45"
5	Michael Rogers (AUS)	+ 56"
6	Jean Nuttli (SUI)	+ 1' 21"
7	Yuriy Krivtsov (UKR)	+ 1' 53"
8	Jens Voigt (GER)	+ 2' 01"
9	Evgeni Petrov (RUS)	+ 2' 05"
10	Filippo Pozzato (ITA)	+ 2' 38"
