= 2001 Bayern Rundfahrt =

Race details
- Dates: 23–27 May 2001
- Stages: 6
- Distance: 865.5 km (537.8 mi)
- Winning time: 20h 34' 14"

Results
	Winner	Jens Voigt (GER)
	Second	Rolf Aldag (GER)
	Third	Artour Babaitsev (RUS)

The 2001 Bayern Rundfahrt was the 22nd edition of the Bayern Rundfahrt cycle race and was held on 23 May to 27 May 2001. The race started in Pfarrkirchen and finished in Forchheim. The race was won by Jens Voigt.

== General classification ==
Final general classification

Rank	Rider	Time
1	Jens Voigt (GER)	20h 34' 14"
2	Rolf Aldag (GER)	+ 7"
3	Artour Babaitsev (RUS)	+ 10"
4	Christian Wegmann (GER)	+ 17"
5	Beat Zberg (SUI)	+ 18"
6	Evgeni Petrov (RUS)	+ 27"
7	Jörg Ludewig (GER)	+ 45"
8	Cadel Evans (AUS)	+ 47"
9	Martin Cotar (CRO)	+ 59"
10	Marcel Duijn (NED)	+ 1' 01"
