= 2003 Bayern Rundfahrt =

Race details
- Dates: 21–25 May 2003
- Stages: 6
- Distance: 885.6 km (550.3 mi)
- Winning time: 21h 08' 08"

Results
| | Winner | Michael Rich (GER) |
| | Second | Patrik Sinkewitz (GER) |
| | Third | Thomas Liese (GER) |

The 2003 Bayern Rundfahrt was the 15th edition of the Bayern Rundfahrt cycle race and was held on 21–25 May 2003. The race started in Grassau and finished in Höchstadt an der Aisch. The race was won by Michael Rich.

== General classification ==
Final general classification

| Rank | Rider | Time |
|---|---|---|
| 1 | Michael Rich (GER) | 21h 08' 08" |
| 2 | Patrik Sinkewitz (GER) | + 30" |
| 3 | Thomas Liese (GER) | + 34" |
| 4 | Olaf Pollack (GER) | + 41" |
| 5 | Jens Voigt (GER) | + 52" |
| 6 | Torsten Schmidt (GER) | s.t. |
| 7 | Udo Bölts (GER) | + 1' 03" |
| 8 | Rolf Aldag (GER) | + 1' 16" |
| 9 | Christian Poos (LUX) | + 1' 25" |
| 10 | Pierre Bourquenoud (SUI) | + 1' 35" |
