= 2003 Chrono des Herbiers =

Race details
- Dates: 19 October 2003
- Stages: 1
- Distance: 48.15 km (29.92 mi)
- Winning time: 1h 00' 23"

Results
	Winner	Michael Rich (GER)
	Second	Bert Roesems (BEL)
	Third	Uwe Peschel (GER)

The 2003 Chrono des Herbiers was the 22nd edition of the Chrono des Nations cycle race and was held on 19 October 2003. The race started and finished in Les Herbiers. The race was won by Michael Rich.

== General classification ==
Final general classification

Rank	Rider	Time
1	Michael Rich (GER)	1h 00' 23"
2	Bert Roesems (BEL)	+ 32"
3	Uwe Peschel (GER)	+ 1' 07"
4	Sebastian Lang (GER)	+ 1' 12"
5	Eddy Seigneur (FRA)	+ 1' 22"
6	László Bodrogi (FRA)	+ 2' 15"
7	Raivis Belohvoščiks (LAT)	+ 2' 31"
8	Jean Nuttli (SUI)	+ 2' 34"
9	Ben Day (AUS)	+ 2' 48"
10	Yuriy Krivtsov (UKR)	+ 3' 10"
