= 2004 Deutschland Tour =

Twenty-eighth edition of the cycling race

These are the results for the 2004 edition of the Deutschland Tour cycling race, which was won by Germany's Patrik Sinkewitz.

== Final classification ==
Pos	Cyclist	Team	Time
1	Patrik Sinkewitz (GER)	Quick. Step-Davitamon	26h 17' 12"
2	Jens Voigt (GER)	Team CSC	+ 18"
3	Jan Hruška (CZE)	Liberty Seguros	+ 23"
4	Igor González de Galdeano (ESP)	Liberty Seguros	+ 28"
5	Francisco Mancebo (ESP)	Illes Balears-Banesto	+ 54"
6	Andreas Klöden (GER)	T-Mobile Team	+ 57"
7	Jan Ullrich (GER)	T-Mobile Team	+ 59"
8	Iván Gutiérrez (ESP)	Illes Balears-Banesto	+ 1' 47"
9	Davide Rebellin (ITA)	Gerolsteiner	+ 2' 12"
10	Sergio Marinangeli (ITA)	Domina Vacanze	+ 2' 18"

== Stages ==
=== 31-05-2004: Karlsruhe-Karlsruhe, 23 km ===
RANK	STAGE ONE - ITT	TEAM	TIME
1	Michael Rich (GER)	Gerolsteiner	27' 20"
2	Jan Ullrich (GER)	T-Mobile Team	+ 24"
3	Uwe Peschel (GER)	Gerolsteiner	+ 29"

=== 01-06-2004: Bad Urach-Wangen im Allgäu, 180 km ===
RANK	STAGE TWO	TEAM	TIME
1	Tom Boonen (BEL)	Quick. Step-Davitamon	4h 00' 47"
2	Allan Davis (AUS)	Liberty Seguros	s.t.
3	Danilo Hondo (GER)	Gerolsteiner	s.t.

=== 02-06-2004: Wangen im Allgäu-St. Anton am Arlberg, 170 km ===
RANK	STAGE THREE	TEAM	TIME
1	Patrik Sinkewitz (GER)	Quick. Step-Davitamon	4h 31' 06"
2	Francisco Mancebo (ESP)	Illes Balears-Banesto	s.t.
3	Pieter Weening (NED)	Rabobank	+ 34"

=== 03-06-2004: Bad Tölz-Landshut, 190 km ===
RANK	STAGE FOUR	TEAM	TIME
1	Sébastien Hinault (FRA)	Crédit Agricole	4h 10' 09"
2	Allan Davis (AUS)	Liberty Seguros	s.t.
3	Tom Boonen (BEL)	Quick. Step-Davitamon	s.t.

=== 04-06-2004: Kelheim-Kulmbach, 192 km ===
RANK	STAGE FIVE	TEAM	TIME
1	Allan Davis (AUS)	Liberty Seguros	4h 20' 07"
2	Danilo Hondo (GER)	Gerolsteiner	s.t.
3	Steffen Radochla (GER)	Illes Balears-Banesto	s.t.

=== 05-06-2004: Kulmbach-Oberwiesenthal, 180 km ===
RANK	STAGE SIX	TEAM	TIME
1	Francisco Mancebo (ESP)	Illes Balears-Banesto	4h 52' 49"
2	Jens Voigt (GER)	Team CSC	s.t.
3	Patrik Sinkewitz (GER)	Quick. Step-Davitamon	s.t.

=== 06-06-2004: Chemnitz-Leipzig, 170 km ===
RANK	STAGE SEVEN	TEAM	TIME
1	Tom Boonen (BEL)	Quick. Step-Davitamon	3h 53' 37"
2	Danilo Hondo (GER)	Gerolsteiner	s.t.
3	Sebastian Siedler (GER)	Team Wiesenhof	s.t.
