= 2000 Bayern Rundfahrt =

Race details
- Dates: 17–21 May 2000
- Stages: 5
- Distance: 890 km (553.0 mi)
- Winning time: 21h 59' 00"

Results
	Winner	Jens Voigt (GER)
	Second	Michael Rich (GER)
	Third	Tobias Steinhauser (GER)

The 2000 Bayern Rundfahrt was the 21st edition of the Bayern Rundfahrt cycle race and was held on 17 May to 21 May 2000. The race started in Burghausen and finished in Neustadt an der Aisch. The race was won by Jens Voigt.

== General classification ==
Final general classification

Rank	Rider	Time
1	Jens Voigt (GER)	21h 59' 00"
2	Michael Rich (GER)	+ 4"
3	Tobias Steinhauser (GER)	+ 6"
4	Thor Hushovd (NOR)	+ 9"
5	Jacky Durand (FRA)	+ 14"
6	Sven Teutenberg (GER)	+ 19"
7	Fabio Malberti (ITA)	s.t.
8	Rolf Aldag (GER)	+ 32"
9	Erwin Thijs (BEL)	+ 36"
10	Christopher Jenner (AUS)	+ 38"
