= 2002 UCI Road World Championships – Men's time trial =

Men's Individual Time Trial
2002 UCI Road World Championships
- Rainbow jersey

Race details
- Dates: 11 October 2002
- Stages: 1
- Distance: 40.4 km (25.10 mi)
- Winning time: 48' 08.45"

Results
	Winner	Santiago Botero (COL)	(Colombia)
	Second	Michael Rich (GER)	(Germany)
	Third	Igor González de Galdeano (ESP)	(Spain)

The Men's Individual Time Trial at the 2002 UCI Road World Championships was the 9th edition of the event. The race took place on 11 October 2002 in Zolder, Belgium. The race was won by Santiago Botero of Colombia.

== Final classification ==
General classification (1–10)

Rank	Rider	Time
1st place, gold medalist(s)	Santiago Botero (COL)	48' 08.45"
2nd place, silver medalist(s)	Michael Rich (GER)	+ 8.23"
3rd place, bronze medalist(s)	Igor González de Galdeano (ESP)	+ 17.15"
4	László Bodrogi (HUN)	+ 25.53"
5	Uwe Peschel (GER)	+ 33.76"
6	David Millar (GBR)	+ 35.32"
7	Aitor González (ESP)	+ 1' 04.03"
8	Michael Rogers (AUS)	+ 1' 06.34"
9	Fabian Cancellara (SUI)	+ 1' 07.81"
10	Raivis Belohvoščiks (LAT)	+ 1' 15.42"
