= 1998 Bayern Rundfahrt =

Race details
- Dates: 26–31 May 1998
- Stages: 5
- Distance: 904.4 km (562.0 mi)
- Winning time: 22h 33' 04"

Results
	Winner	Steffen Kjærgaard (NOR)
	Second	Axel Merckx (BEL)
	Third	Daniel Atienza (ESP)

The 1998 Bayern Rundfahrt was the 19th edition of the Bayern Rundfahrt cycle race and was held on 26 May to 31 May 1998. The race started in Lohr am Main and finished in Berchtesgaden. The race was won by Steffen Kjærgaard.

== General classification ==
Final general classification

Rank	Rider	Time
1	Steffen Kjærgaard (NOR)	22h 33' 04"
2	Axel Merckx (BEL)	+ 19"
3	Daniel Atienza (ESP)	+ 46"
4	Cristian Gasperoni (ITA)	+ 51"
5	Andre Dolci (ITA)	+ 1' 41"
6	Torsten Schmidt (GER)	+ 2' 00"
7	Dennis Rasmussen (DEN)	+ 2' 19"
8	Patrick Tolhoek (NED)	+ 2' 21"
9	Jörg Jaksche (GER)	+ 2' 31"
10	Sven Montgomery (SUI)	+ 2' 41"
