= 1996 Bayern Rundfahrt =

1996 Bayern–Rundfahrt
Race details
- Dates: 28 May–2 June 1996
- Stages: 5
- Distance: 678.3 km (421.5 mi)
- Winning time: 19h 48' 27"

Results
	Winner	Uwe Peschel (GER)
	Second	Michael Rich (GER)
	Third	Andreas Walzer (GER)

The 1996 Bayern Rundfahrt was the 8th edition of the Bayern Rundfahrt cycle race and was held on 28 May to 2 June 1996. The race started in Rottach-Egern and finished in Burglengenfeld. The race was won by Uwe Peschel.

== General classification ==
Final general classification

Rank	Rider	Time
1	Uwe Peschel (GER)	19h 48' 27"
2	Michael Rich (GER)	+ 18"
3	Andreas Walzer (GER)	+ 36"
4	Sergei Ivanov (RUS)	+ 1' 00"
5	Jörn Reuss (GER)	+ 1' 02"
6	Glenn D'Hollander (BEL)	+ 1' 09"
7	Robert Pintarič (SLO)	+ 1' 14"
8	Servais Knaven (NED)	+ 1' 28"
9	Artur Babaitsev (RUS)	+ 1' 28"
10	Boris Premužič (SLO)	+ 1' 37"
