= 2004 Bayern Rundfahrt =

Race details
- Dates: 19–23 May 2004
- Stages: 6
- Distance: 894.5 km (555.8 mi)
- Winning time: 22h 23' 54"

Results
	Winner	Jens Voigt (GER)
	Second	Andreas Klöden (GER)
	Third	Tomasz Brożyna (POL)

The 2004 Bayern Rundfahrt was the 25th edition of the Bayern Rundfahrt cycle race and was held on 19 May to 23 May 2004. The race started in Selb and finished in Burghausen. The race was won by Jens Voigt.

== General classification ==
Final general classification

Rank	Rider	Time
1	Jens Voigt (GER)	22h 23' 54"
2	Andreas Klöden (GER)	+ 30"
3	Tomasz Brożyna (POL)	+ 44"
4	Massimiliano Gentili (ITA)	+ 56"
5	René Weissinger (GER)	+ 1' 16"
6	Pascal Hungerbühler (AUT)	s.t.
7	Giampaolo Cheula (ITA)	+ 1' 41"
8	Bekim Christensen (DEN)	+ 1' 49"
9	Michael Rich (GER)	+ 3' 30"
10	Stefan Schumacher (GER)	+ 3' 32"
