= LuK Challenge Chrono =

Race details
- Date: Late July - Early August
- Region: Rastatt, Germany
- English name: LuK Challenge Chrono
- Local name(s): LuK Challenge Chrono (in German)
- Discipline: Road race
- Competition: UCI Europe Tour
- Type: Team Time Trial

History
- First edition: 1968
- Editions: 19
- Final edition: 2006
- First winner: Vittorio Adorni (ITA); Ferdinand Bracke (BEL)
- Final winner: Markus Fothen (GER); Sebastian Lang (GER)

LuK Challenge Chrono was a road bicycle race held annually as a team time trial for pairs in Bühl, Germany. In 2005 and 2006, the race was organized as a 1.1 event on the UCI Europe Tour. After 2006, the sponsor, LuK, withdrew as part of Germany's general disengagement from cycling amidst a number of doping scandals, and the race did not take place again.

In the past, this race was also known as:

- 1968 – 1992: Grand Prix Baden-Baden
- 1993 – 1996: Telekom Grand Prix
- 1997 – 1999: Grand Prix Breitling
- 2000 – 2001: Grand Prix EnBW
- 2002 – 2003: Karlsruher Versicherungs-Grand Prix
- 2004 – 2006: LuK Challenge (Bühl)

== Winners ==
Year	Country	Rider	Team
1968	Italy	Vittorio Adorni (victory shared with Ferdinand Bracke)	
1968	Belgium	Ferdinand Bracke (victory shared with Vittorio Adorni)	
1969	Belgium	Herman van Springel (victory shared with Roger De Vlaeminck)	
1969	Belgium	Roger De Vlaeminck (victory shared with Herman van Springel)	
1971	Belgium	Eddy Merckx (victory shared with Herman van Springel)	
1971	Belgium	Herman van Springel (victory shared with Eddy Merckx)	
1989	France	Laurent Fignon (victory shared with Thierry Marie)	
1989	France	Thierry Marie (victory shared with Laurent Fignon)	
1992	Germany	Dominik Krieger (victory shared with Tony Rominger)	
1992	Switzerland	Tony Rominger (victory shared with Dominik Krieger)	
1993	Italy	Gianni Bugno (victory shared with Maurizio Fondriest)	
1993	Italy	Maurizio Fondriest (victory shared with Gianni Bugno)	
1994	Germany	Jens Lehmann (victory shared with Tony Rominger)	
1994	Switzerland	Tony Rominger (victory shared with Jens Lehmann)	
1995	Italy	Andrea Chiurato (victory shared with Tony Rominger)	
1995	Switzerland	Tony Rominger (victory shared with Andrea Chiurato)	
1996	Great Britain	Chris Boardman (victory shared with Uwe Peschel)	
1996	Germany	Uwe Peschel (victory shared with Chris Boardman)	
1997	Switzerland	Oscar Camenzind (victory shared with Johan Museeuw)	
1997	Belgium	Johan Museeuw (victory shared with Oscar Camenzind)	
1998	Germany	Udo Bölts (victory shared with Christian Henn)	
1998	Germany	Christian Henn (victory shared with Udo Bölts)	
1999	Great Britain	Chris Boardman (victory shared with Jens Voigt)	
1999	Germany	Jens Voigt (victory shared with Chris Boardman)	
2000	Germany	Michael Rich (victory shared with Torsten Schmidt)	
2000	Germany	Torsten Schmidt (victory shared with Michael Rich)	
2001	France	Florent Brard (victory shared with Christophe Moreau)	
2001	France	Christophe Moreau (victory shared with Florent Brard)	
2002	Germany	Uwe Peschel (victory shared with Michael Rich)	
2002	Germany	Michael Rich (victory shared with Uwe Peschel)	
2003	Germany	Sebastian Lang (victory shared with Michael Rich)	
2003	Germany	Michael Rich (victory shared with Sebastian Lang)	
2004	United States	Bobby Julich (victory shared with Jens Voigt)	
2004	Germany	Jens Voigt (victory shared with Bobby Julich)	
2005	United States	Bobby Julich (victory shared with Jens Voigt)	
2005	Germany	Jens Voigt (victory shared with Bobby Julich)	
2006	Germany	Markus Fothen (victory shared with Sebastian Lang)	
2006	Germany	Sebastian Lang (victory shared with Markus Fothen)	
