= 1997 Bayern Rundfahrt =

Race details
- Dates: 27 May–1 June 1997
- Stages: 5 + Prologue
- Distance: 925.2 km (574.9 mi)
- Winning time: 23h 15' 11"

Results
	Winner	Christian Henn (GER)
	Second	Bert Dietz (GER)
	Third	Arnaud Prétot (FRA)

The 1997 Bayern Rundfahrt was the 18th edition of the Bayern Rundfahrt cycle race and was held on 27 May to 1 June 1997. The race started in Marktoberdorf and finished in Pfarrkirchen. The race was won by Christian Henn.

== General classification ==
Final general classification

Rank	Rider	Time
1	Christian Henn (GER)	23h 15' 11"
2	Bert Dietz (GER)	+ 2"
3	Arnaud Prétot (FRA)	+ 19"
4	Massimiliano Mori (ITA)	+ 51"
5	Servais Knaven (NED)	+ 2' 40"
6	Andreas Klöden (GER)	+ 2' 42"
7	Bjørnar Vestøl (NOR)	
8	Jan Schaffrath (GER)	
9	Dirk Müller (GER)	
10	Erik Zabel (GER)	
