= Michael Rich (cyclist) =

German cyclist (born 1969)

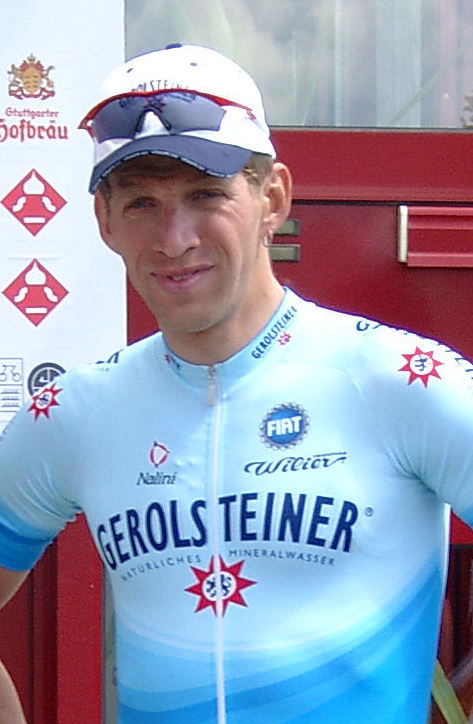

Personal information
- Full name: Michael Rich
- Born: 23 September 1969 (age 57) Freiburg, West Germany

Cycling career
- Sport: Cycling
- Discipline: Road
- Role: Rider
- Rider type: Time trialist

Professional teams
- 1997–1998: Saeco–Estro
- 1999–2006: Gerolsteiner

Major wins
- Stage races Bayern Rundfahrt (2002, 2003, 2005) One-day races and Classics National Time Trial Championships (2000, 2003, 2004, 2005)
Medal record
Representing Germany
Men's road bicycle racing
Olympic Games
Gold medal – first place	1992 Barcelona	Team Time Trial
World Championships
Silver medal – second place	2000 Plouay	Elite Time Trial
Silver medal – second place	2002 Heusden	Elite Time Trial
Silver medal – second place	2004 Verona	Elite Time Trial
Bronze medal – third place	2003 Hamilton	Elite Time Trial

Michael Rich (born 23 September 1969) is a German former professional road bicycle racer who won the gold medal for his native country in the men's team time trial (100 km) at the 1992 Summer Olympics in Barcelona, Spain. His winning teammates were Christian Meyer, Bernd Dittert and Uwe Peschel.

Rich is most famous for his individual time trial participations in the Grand Tours (Tour de France, Giro d'Italia and Vuelta a España). He is the father of two children.

Rich retired from racing in 2006. His profession was a mechanic.

== Major results ==
1989
8th Overall Peace Race
1990
3rd Chrono des Herbiers
1991
4th Chrono des Herbiers
1994
1st Stage 4a (ITT) Regio-Tour
1st Stage 2 Peace Race
3rd Time trial, National Road Championships
UCI Road World Championships

3rd Team time trial
10th Time trial

1996
2nd Overall Bayern Rundfahrt
3rd Time trial, National Road Championships
10th Time trial, Olympic Games
1997
4th HEW Cyclassics
1998
7th HEW Cyclassics
7th Coppa Bernocchi
1999
2nd Overall Regio-Tour

1st Stage 3b (ITT)

6th Overall Tour Trans Canada

1st Stage 10 (ITT)

6th Grand Prix des Nations
9th Veenendaal–Veenendaal
2000
1st Time trial, National Road Championships
1st Overall Tour de la Somme

1st Stage 1

1st EnBW Grand Prix (with Torsten Schmidt)
2nd Overall Bayern Rundfahrt

1st Stage 1b

2nd Time trial, UCI Road World Championships
4th Grand Prix des Nations
7th Overall Circuit Franco-Belge
2001
1st Stage 1a (ITT) Niedersachsen-Rundfahrt
4th Grand Prix Eddy Merckx (with Uwe Peschel)
6th EnBW Grand Prix (with Uwe Peschel)
10th Overall Circuit de la Sarthe
2002
1st Overall Bayern-Rundfahrt

1st Stage 2 (ITT)

1st Chrono des Herbiers
1st Karlsruher Versicherungs Grand-Prix (with Uwe Peschel)
1st Stage 4 (ITT) Deutschland Tour
1st Stage 4 (ITT) Tour du Poitou-Charentes et de la Vienne
1st Stage 4b (ITT) Niedersachsen-Rundfahrt
2nd Time trial, UCI Road World Championships
2nd Time trial, National Road Championships
2nd Grand Prix Eddy Merckx (with Uwe Peschel)
4th Grand Prix des Nations
2003
1st Time trial, National Road Championships
1st Overall Bayern-Rundfahrt

1st Stage 2 (ITT)

1st Chrono des Herbiers
1st Grand Prix des Nations
1st Grand Prix Eddy Merckx (with Uwe Peschel)
1st Karlsruher Versicherungs Grand-Prix (with Sebastian Lang)
3rd Time trial, UCI Road World Championships
4th Niedersachsen-Rundfahrt

1st Stage 1a (ITT)

2004
1st Time trial, National Road Championships
1st Grand Prix des Nations
1st Stage 1 (ITT) Deutschland Tour
1st Stage 4 (ITT) Hessen-Rundfahrt
2nd Time trial, UCI Road World Championships
2nd LuK Challenge Chrono (with Uwe Peschel)
3rd Grand Prix Eddy Merckx (with Uwe Peschel)
4th Time trial, Olympic Games
8th Overall Sachsen Tour
9th Overall Bayern Rundfahrt

1st Stage 3 (ITT)

2005
1st Time trial, National Road Championships
1st Overall Bayern-Rundfahrt
1st Stage 2 (ITT) Ster Elektrotour
2nd Overall Rheinland-Pfalz Rundfahrt
2nd LuK Challenge Chrono (with Markus Fothen)
2006
2nd Time trial, National Road Championships
