= 2005 Bayern Rundfahrt =

Race details
- Dates: 25–29 May 2005
- Stages: 5
- Distance: 783.5 km (486.8 mi)
- Winning time: 18h 56' 10"

Results
	Winner	Michael Rich (GER)
	Second	Alexander Vinokourov (KAZ)
	Third	Linus Gerdemann (GER)

The 2005 Bayern Rundfahrt was the 26th edition of the Bayern Rundfahrt cycle race and was held on 25 May to 29 May 2005. The race started in Kempten and finished in Neumarkt in der Oberpfalz. The race was won by Michael Rich.

== General classification ==
Final general classification

Rank	Rider	Time
1	Michael Rich (GER)	18h 56' 10"
2	Alexander Vinokourov (KAZ)	+ 20"
3	Linus Gerdemann (GER)	+ 59"
4	Tomasz Brożyna (POL)	+ 1' 13"
5	Björn Glasner (GER)	+ 1' 58"
6	Corey Sweet (AUS)	+ 2' 00"
7	Mikel Astarloza (ESP)	s.t.
8	Gabriele Bosisio (ITA)	+ 2' 04"
9	Stéphane Goubert (FRA)	+ 2' 06"
10	Ruslan Pidhornyy (UKR)	s.t.
