= Arnaud Prétot =

French cyclist

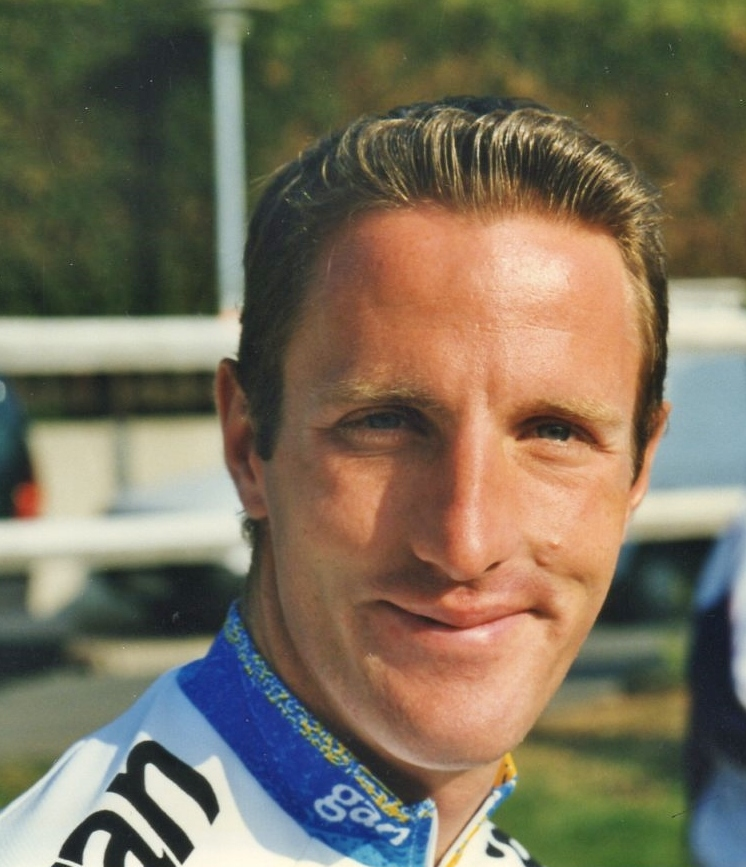

Personal information
- Born: 16 August 1971 (age 55) Besançon, France
- Height: 1.83 m (6 ft 0 in)
- Weight: 71 kg (157 lb; 11 st 3 lb)

Cycling career
- Sport: Cycling
- Current team: Retired
- Discipline: Road
- Role: Rider

Professional teams
- 1995-1998: Gan
- 1999-2000: Cofidis
- 2001: Festina
- 2002: Saint-Quentin-Oktos

Arnaud Prétot (born 16 August 1971) is a former French cyclist.

== Major results ==
1994
1st Dijon-Troyes
1st Colmar-Strasbourg
2nd Rhône-Alpes Isère Tour
1995
National Team Time Trial Champion (with Cédric Vasseur, Nicolas Aubier and Pascal Deramé)

2nd Tour du Poitou-Charentes
1st stage 1

1996
1st stage 1 Tour du Poitou-Charentes
1997
3rd Bayern Rundfahrt
1998
2nd Paris–Camembert
2001
3rd National Road Race Championships
