= Patrick Gretsch =

German racing cyclist

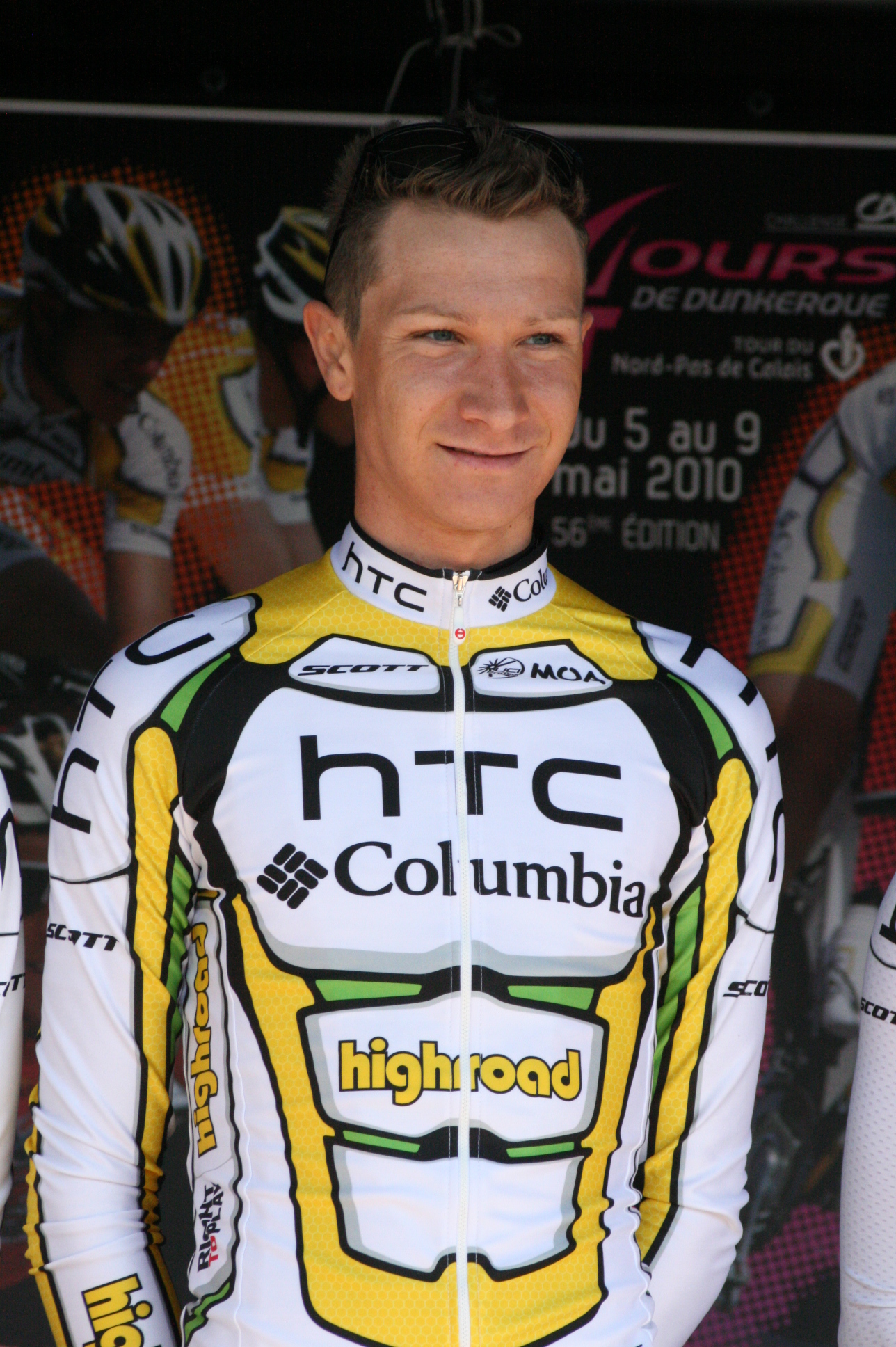
- Gretsch in 2010

Personal information
- Full name: Patrick Gretsch
- Born: 7 April 1987 (age 39) Erfurt, East Germany
- Height: 1.87 m (6 ft 2 in)
- Weight: 69 kg (152 lb; 10.9 st)

Cycling career
- Sport: Cycling
- Current team: Retired
- Discipline: Road
- Role: Rider
- Rider type: Time-trialist

Professional teams
- 2006–2009: Thüringer Energie Team
- 2010–2011: Team HTC–Columbia
- 2012–2013: Project 1t4i
- 2014–2016: Ag2r–La Mondiale

Patrick Gretsch (born 7 April 1987) is a German former professional cyclist, who rode professionally between 2006 and 2016 for the Thüringer Energie Team, HTC–Highroad, Argos–Shimano and AG2R La Mondiale teams.

== Major results ==
2004
1st Time trial, UCI Junior Road World Championships
1st Time trial, National Junior Road Championships
2005
1st Stage 3 (ITT) Trofeo Karlsberg
2006
7th Overall 3-Länder-Tour
2007
10th Overall Rás Tailteann
2008
1st Overall Thüringen Rundfahrt der U23

1st Stage 5 (ITT)

2nd Time trial, UCI Under-23 Road World Championships
2009
1st Time trial, National Under-23 Road Championships
3rd Time trial, UCI Under-23 Road World Championships
4th Overall Thüringen Rundfahrt der U23
9th Rund um Köln
2010
2nd Time trial, National Road Championships
2011
1st Prologue Ster ZLM Toer
1st Prologue USA Pro Cycling Challenge
1st Stage 1 (TTT) Giro d'Italia
3rd Time trial, National Road Championships
2012
1st Prologue Vuelta a Andalucía
2013
2nd Time trial, National Road Championships
4th Overall Tour of Alberta

=== Grand Tour general classification results timeline ===
Grand Tour	2011	2012	2013	2014	2015	2016
Giro d'Italia	138	—	69	95	94	DNF
Tour de France	—	141	—	—	—	—
Vuelta a España	—	—	—	126	—	—

Legend
—	Did not compete
DNF	Did not finish
