= 2003 UCI Road World Championships =

Cycling world championships

- Location within Southern Ontario Location within Canada
- Venue: Hamilton, Ontario, Canada
- Date: 7–12 October 2003
- Coordinates: 43°15′24″N 79°52′09″W
- Events: 10

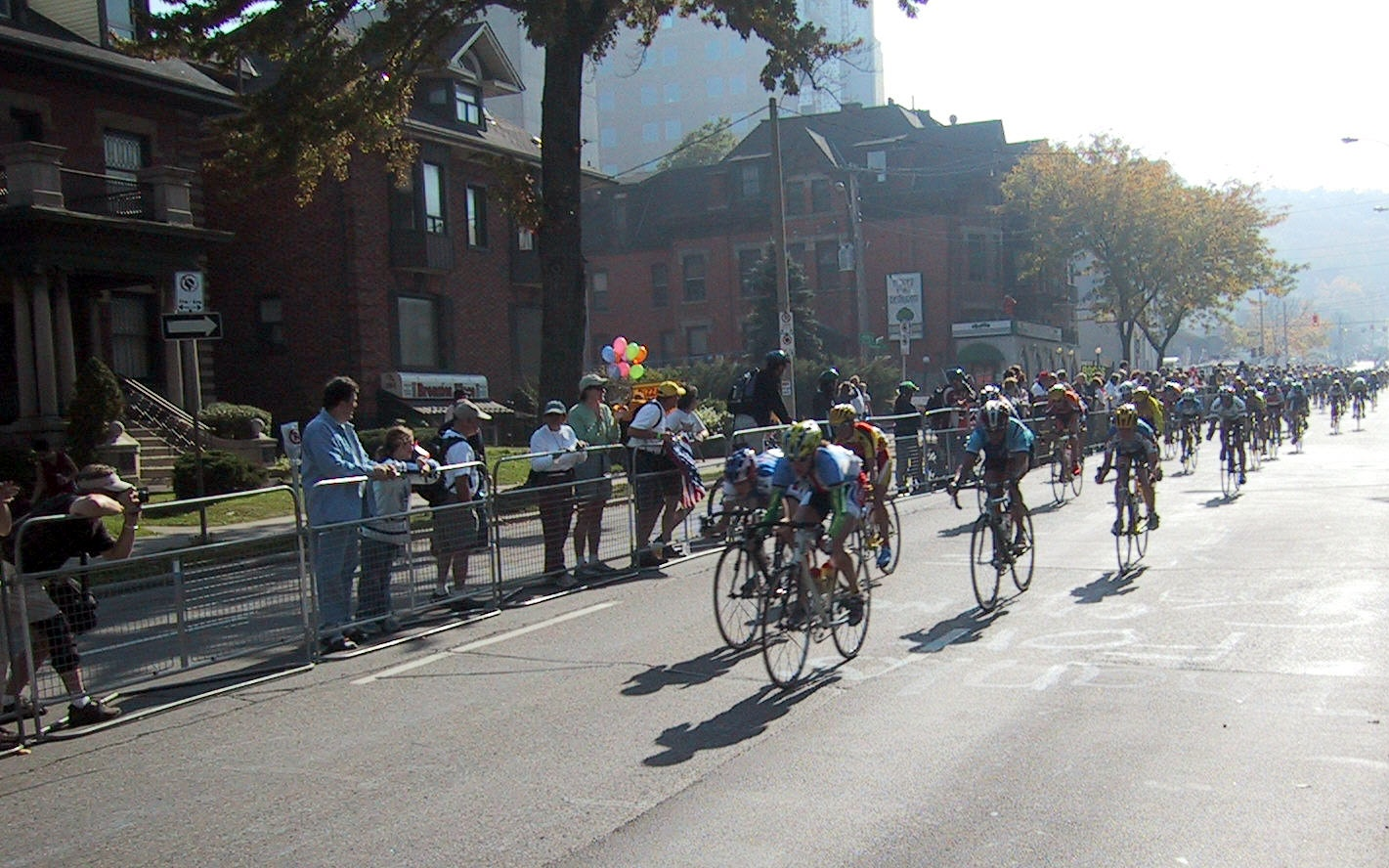
Riders taking part in the championships

The 2003 UCI Road World Championships took place in Hamilton, Ontario, Canada, between October 7 and October 12, 2003. The event consisted of a road race and a time trial for men, women, men under 23, junior men and junior women.

David Millar was handed a two-year ban and stripped of his world time trial title by the British cycling federation for taking the banned performance enhancer EPO. Following this disqualification, the UCI declared Michael Rogers as the winner with the silver medal going to Uwe Peschel and the bronze to Michael Rich.

Jeannie Longo rode alone ahead of the pack for most of the women's road race but was passed approximately 500m from the finish.

== Courses ==
The road races took place on a 12 kilometres (7.5 mi) course that climbed the Niagara Escarpment twice per lap – a 1.6 km (0.99 mi) climb with an average gradient of 4.9% and a 2.5 km (1.6 mi) climb with an average gradient of 4.2%.

Two time trial courses were used – a 21 kilometres (13 mi) course that climbed the Niagara Escarpment on two occasions, and a 15 kilometres (9.3 mi) course that climbed the Niagara Escarpment once.

The courses had been designed by former professional cyclist Steve Bauer.

== Events summary ==
Event	Gold		Silver		Bronze	
Men's Events
Men's road race	Igor Astarloa; Spain	6h 30' 19"	Alejandro Valverde; Spain	+ 5"	Peter van Petegem; Belgium	s.t.
Men's time trial	David Millar; Great Britain	51' 17" (Stripped of title)	Michael Rogers; Australia	+ 1' 25"	Uwe Peschel; Germany	s.t.
Women's Events
Women's road race	Susanne Ljungskog; Sweden	3h 16' 06"	Mirjam Melchers; Netherlands	+ 10"	Nicole Cooke; Great Britain	+ 12"
Women's time trial	Joane Somarriba; Spain	28' 23"	Judith Arndt; Germany	+ 11"	Zulfiya Zabirova; Russia	+ 26"
Men's Under-23 Events
Men's under-23 road race	Sergey Lagutin; Uzbekistan	4h 14' 05"	Johan Van Summeren; Belgium	s.t.	Thomas Dekker; Netherlands	s.t.
Men's under-23 time trial	Marcus Fothen; Germany	38' 35"	Niels Scheuneman; Netherlands	+ 18"	Alexandr Bespalov; Russia	+ 21"
Men's Junior Events
Men's Junior Road Race	Kai Reus; Netherlands	3h 01' 30"	Anders Lund; Denmark	+ 14"	Lukaz Fus; Czech Republic	s.t.
Men's Junior Time Trial	Mikhail Ignatiev; Russia	27' 01"	Dmytro Grabovskyy; Ukraine	+ 21"	Viktor Renäng; Sweden	+ 22"
Women's Junior Events
Women's Junior Road Race	Loes Markerink; Netherlands	2h 05' 39"	Irina Tolmacheva; Russia	s.t.	Sabine Fischer; Germany	s.t.
Women's Junior Time Trial	Bianca Knöpfle; Germany	22' 17"	Loes Markerink; Netherlands	+ 16"	Iris Slappendel; Netherlands	+ 30"
