= Christopher Jenner =

New Zealand cyclist

Personal information
- Born: 3 November 1974 (age 51) Upper Hutt, New Zealand

Cycling career
- Sport: Cycling
- Current team: Retired
- Discipline: Road
- Role: Rider

Amateur team
- 1997: US Montauban Cyclisme 82

Professional team
- 1998–2003: Crédit Agricole

Christopher Jenner (born 3 November 1974) is a former French professional cyclist. He became a French national in June 2000 though his marriage.

== Major results ==
1994
2nd Tour de la Creuse
1996
1st Grand Prix du Pays d'Aix
2nd Tour de la Creuse
3rd Grand Prix Cristal Energie
3rd Grand Prix de la ville de Buxerolles
1997
1st Grand Prix de la ville de Buxerolles
2nd Ronde de l'Isard
3rd Bordeaux-Saintes
1999
1st stage 7 Tour de l'Avenir
2nd Tour de l'Ain

1st stage 5

3rd Trophée des Grimpeurs
8th of Tirreno–Adriatico
2000
7th Tour de Picardie
8th Étoile de Bessèges
9th GP de Fourmies
10th Bayern Rundfahrt
2001
1st stage 5 Tour de France (TTT)
1st Tour of Wellington

1st stages 1 and 4

5th Tour Down Under
5th Le Tour de Langkawi
2002
1st Boucles de l'Aulne
9th Bayern Rundfahrt
