= 2000 UCI Road World Championships =

Cycling world championships

- Venue: Plouay, France
- Date: 9–15 October 2000
- Coordinates: 47°54′56″N 3°20′2″W
- Events: 10

The 2000 UCI Road World Championships took place in Plouay, France, between October 9 and October 15, 2000. The event consisted of a road race and a time trial for men, women, men under 23, junior men and junior women.

== Events summary ==
Event	Gold		Silver		Bronze	
Men's Events
Men's road race	Romāns Vainšteins; Latvia	6h15'28"	Zbigniew Spruch; Poland	s.t.	Óscar Freire; Spain	s.t.
Men's time trial	Serhiy Honchar; Ukraine	56'21"	Michael Rich; Germany	+ 10"	László Bodrogi; Hungary	+ 24"
Women's Events
Women's road race	Zinaida Stahurskaia; Belarus	3h17'39"	Chantal Beltman; Netherlands	+ 1'27"	Madeleine Lindberg; Sweden	+1'50"
Women's time trial	Mari Holden; United States	33'14"	Jeannie Longo-Ciprelli; France	+ 3"	Rasa Polikevičiūtė; Lithuania	+ 46"
Men's Under-23 Events
Men's under-23 road race	Evgeni Petrov; Russia	3h58'06"	Yaroslav Popovych; Ukraine	+ 3"	Lorenzo Bernucci; Italy	s.t.
Men's under-23 time trial	Evgeni Petrov; Russia	43'54"	Fabian Cancellara; Switzerland	+ 52"	Michael Rogers; Australia	+ 1'19"
Men's Junior Events
Men's Junior Road Race	Jeremy Yates; New Zealand	2h59'26"	Antonio Bucciero; Italy	+ 1"	Alexandr Arekeev; Russia	s.t.
Men's Junior Time Trial	Piotr Mazur; Poland	30'58"	Vladimir Gusev; Russia	+ 18"	Łukasz Bodnar; Poland	+ 30"
Women's Junior Events
Women's Junior Road Race	Nicole Cooke; Great Britain	1h49'02"	Magdalena Sadlecka; Poland	+ 8"	Clare Hall-Patch; Canada	+ 12"
Women's Junior Time Trial	Juliette Vandekerckhove; France	22'16"	Katherine Bates; Australia	+ 31"	Bertine Spijkerman; Netherlands	+ 45"

== Medals table ==
Place	Nation	1st place, gold medalist(s)	2nd place, silver medalist(s)	3rd place, bronze medalist(s)	Total
1	Russia	2	1	1	4
2	Poland	1	2	1	4
3	France	1	1	0	2
3	Ukraine	1	1	0	2
5	United States	1	0	0	1
5	Belarus	1	0	0	1
5	New Zealand	1	0	0	1
5	Latvia	1	0	0	1
5	Great Britain	1	0	0	1
10	Australia	0	1	1	2
10	Italy	0	1	1	2
10	Netherlands	0	1	1	2
13	Switzerland	0	1	0	1
13	Germany	0	1	0	1
15	Canada	0	0	1	1
15	Lithuania	0	0	1	1
15	Spain	0	0	1	1
15	Hungary	0	0	1	1
15	Sweden	0	0	1	1
Total		10	10	10	30
