= Steffen Kjærgaard =

Norwegian cyclist (born 1973)

Personal information
- Born: 24 May 1973 (age 53) Tønsberg, Norway

Cycling career
- Sport: Cycling
- Current team: Retired
- Discipline: Road
- Role: Rider

Professional teams
- 1996–1997: TVM–Farm Frites
- 1998–1999: Team Chicky World
- 2000–2003: U.S. Postal Service

Steffen Kjærgaard (born 24 May 1973) is a Norwegian former professional cyclist. Kjærgaard cycled for US Postal Service (2000–2003). He competed in the individual pursuit at the 1992 Summer Olympics. He twice participated in the Tour de France, taking 89th place in 2000 and 101st place in 2001; in both years team captain Lance Armstrong initially won overall but was later disqualified due to doping. Known as a strong time-trial cyclist, Kjærgaard won the overall World Cup in track cycling in 1993. He won the Norwegian National Road Race Championship in 1994.

Kjærgaard has won 12 Nordic Championship (Nordiska mesterskap) gold medals and three King's Cups (kongepokaler). He was director of sport for the Norwegian Cycling Federation until he had to resign in 2012 due to admitting the use of performance-enhancing drugs in his active career. Kjærgaard is married and has two children.

== Doping ==
After the doping allegations against Lance Armstrong, Kjærsgaard admitted use of performance-enhancing drugs on 23 October 2012.

== Teams ==
- US Postal Service Pro Cycling Team
- Team Chicky World
- TVM (cycling team)
- Glåmdal-Nittedal Elite Oslo
- Hasle-Løren IL
- Tønsberg Cycling Club

== Major results ==
- Circuit de la Sarthe (1999)
- Bayern-Rundfahrt (1998)
- Tour de Normandie (1999)
- Tour of Austria (1995)
- Ringerike Grand Prix (1994)
