= Thomas Liese =

German cyclist

Personal information
- Full name: Thomas Liese
- Born: 10 August 1968 (age 58) Sangerhausen, Bezirk Halle, East Germany

Cycling career
- Sport: Cycling
- Current team: Retired
- Discipline: Road
- Role: Rider

Professional teams
- 1999-2002: Team Nürnberger
- 2003: Team Coast
- 2004-2005: Winfix Arnolds Sicherheit

Major wins
- (Germany) National Time Trial Championships (2001)

Thomas Liese (born 10 August 1968 in Sangerhausen) is a former German professional cyclist.

== Major victories ==
1989
1st Olympia's Tour
1990
1st Niedersachsen-Rundfahrt
1998
1st Tour of Greece
1st Rund um die Hainleite
2000
1st Sachsen Tour
2001
1st Stage 4 Settimana Ciclista Lombarda
1st Stage 8 Peace Race
1st (Germany) National Time Trial Championships
2003
1st stage Bayern-Rundfahrt
