= Markus Fothen =

German cyclist

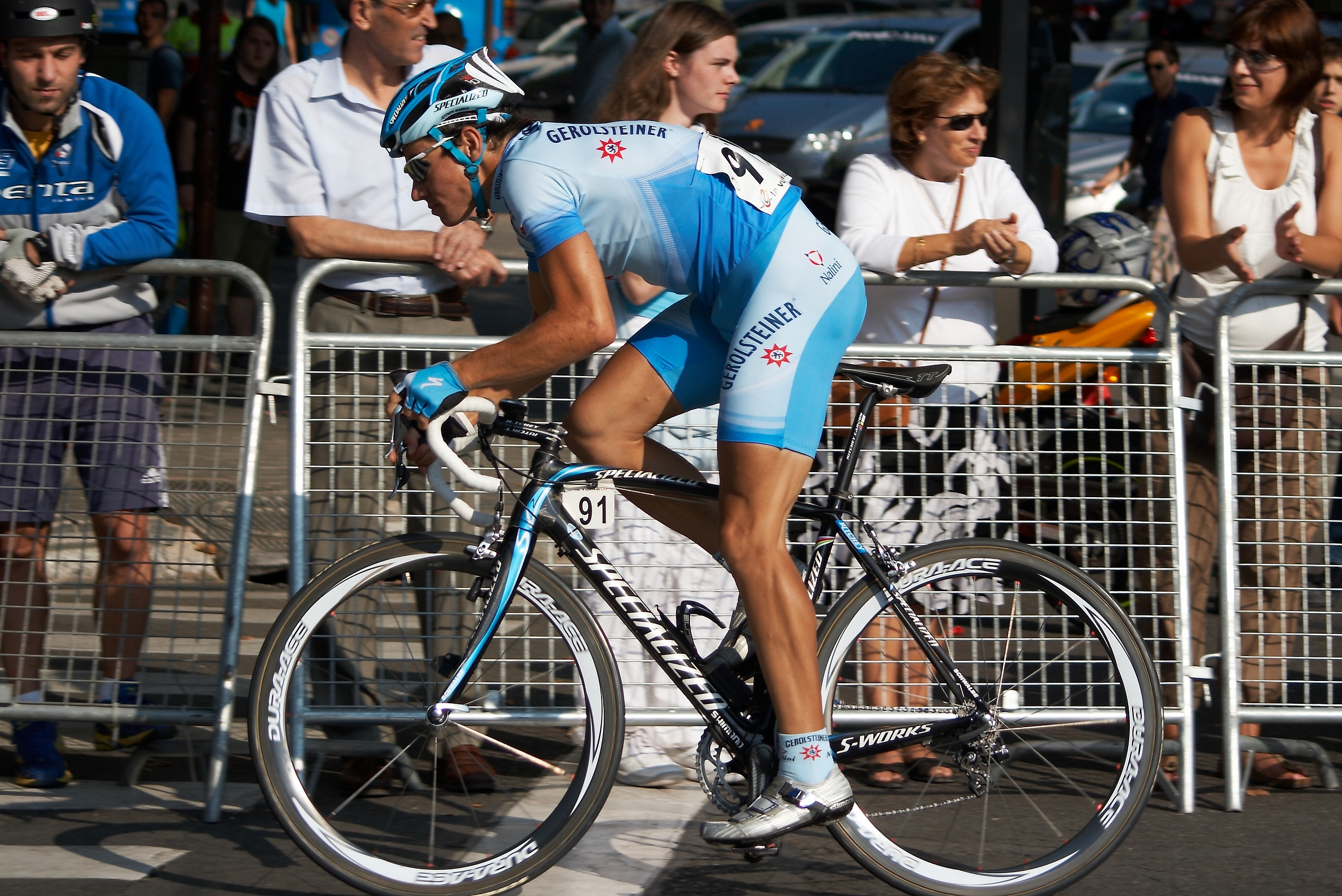
- Fothen at the 2007 Vuelta a España

Personal information
- Full name: Markus Fothen
- Born: 9 September 1981 (age 45) Kaarst, West Germany
- Height: 1.79 m (5 ft 10 in)
- Weight: 71 kg (157 lb)

Cycling career
- Sport: Cycling
- Current team: Retired
- Discipline: Road
- Role: Rider
- Rider type: All-rounder

Amateur team
- 2002–2003: Team TEAG Köstritzer

Professional teams
- 2004–2008: Gerolsteiner
- 2009–2010: Team Milram
- 2011–2013: Team NSP

Major wins
- World Time-Trial Champion (U23) (2003)

Markus Fothen (born 9 September 1981 in Kaarst) is a retired German road racing cyclist, who rode as a professional between 2004 and 2013.

In 2003 Fothen won the under-23 World Championship time trial in Hamilton, Canada. He completed the 30.8 km course in 38:35.29, beating his nearest rival by nearly 20 seconds.

During 2006 Tour de France, Fothen held the white jersey as leader of the young rider classification for 13 stages, losing it to Damiano Cunego on the 17th stage. He finished the Tour 38 seconds behind Cunego.

== Major results ==
2002
1st Overall Ronde de l'Isard

1st Stage 2

2003
1st Time trial, UCI Road World Under–23 Championships
1st Time trial, UEC European Under–23 Road Championships
2nd Overall Ronde de l'Isard
2004
1st GP Triberg-Schwarzwald
4th Overall Regio-Tour
2005
2nd Overall Circuit de la Sarthe
2006
1st LuK Challenge Chrono, time trial duo (with Sebastian Lang)
2007
1st Stage 1 Tour de Romandie
2008
2nd Overall Regio-Tour

1st Stage 5

4th Overall Tirreno–Adriatico
8th Overall Tour de Suisse

1st Stage 5

8th Overall Bayern–Rundfahrt
10th Overall Volta ao Algarve
2010
10th Overall Tour Down Under
2011
7th Overall Oberösterreichrundfahrt
8th Overall Tour d'Azerbaïdjan
2012
8th Overall Szlakiem Grodów Piastowskich
