= Evgeni Petrov (cyclist) =

Russian cyclist

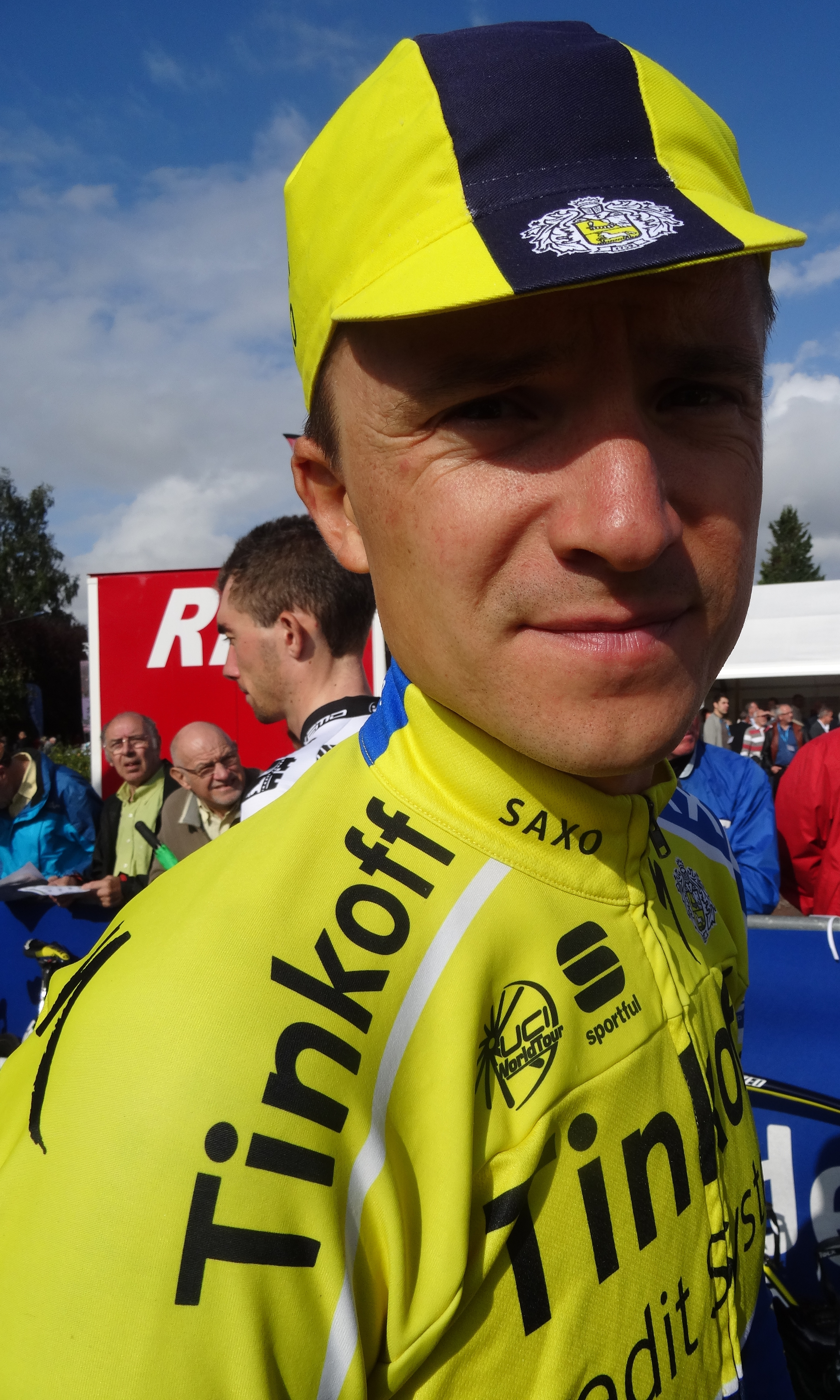
- Petrov at the 2014 Grand Prix d'Isbergues.

Personal information
- Full name: Evgeni Petrov
- Born: 25 May 1978 (age 48) Ufa, Soviet Union
- Height: 1.81 m (5 ft 11 in)
- Weight: 70 kg (154 lb)

Cycling career
- Sport: Cycling
- Current team: Retired
- Discipline: Road
- Role: Rider
- Rider type: Climber

Professional teams
- 2001–2002: Mapei–Quick-Step
- 2003: iBanesto.com
- 2004: Saeco
- 2005–2006: Lampre–Caffita
- 2007–2008: Tinkoff Credit Systems
- 2009–2010: Team Katusha
- 2011–2012: Astana
- 2013–2016: Saxo–Tinkoff

Major wins
- Grand Tours Giro d'Italia 1 individual stage (2010)
Medal record
Representing Russia
UCI Road World Championships
Gold medal – first place	2000 Plouay	Men's under-23 time trial
Gold medal – first place	2000 Plouay	Men's under-23 road race
Bronze medal – third place	1999 Treviso	Men's under-23 road race
European Road Championships
Gold medal – first place	2000 Kielce	Men's under-23 time trial

Evgeni Petrov (born 25 May 1978 in Ufa) is a Russian former professional road bicycle racer, who rode professionally between 2001 and 2016 for the Mapei–Quick-Step, iBanesto.com, Saeco, Lampre–Fondital, Tinkoff Credit Systems, Team Katusha, Astana and Tinkoff teams. He won the 11th stage of the 2010 Giro d'Italia from Lucera to L'Aquila. He was ejected from the 2005 Tour de France and suspended from cycling for two weeks after his haematocrit was deemed over the limit by morning controls on the tenth stage.

== Major results ==
2000
1st Time trial, National Road Championships
UCI Road World Under-23 Championships

1st Road race
1st Time trial

1st Time trial, European Under-23 Road Championships
6th Trofeo Alcide Degasperi
8th Overall Girobio
2001
4th Joseph Vögeli Memorial
6th Overall Bayern Rundfahrt
6th Omloop Groot Oostende
7th Overall Tour de l'Avenir
8th Grand Prix des Nations
9th Overall Tour de l'Ain

1st Stage 2a (ITT)

9th Chrono des Herbiers
2002
1st Time trial, National Road Championships
1st Overall Tour of Slovenia

1st Stage 4

1st Overall Tour de l'Avenir
1st Duo Normand (with Filippo Pozzato)
3rd Firenze–Pistoia
4th Overall Circuit des Mines
4th GP Winterthur
6th Overall Bayern Rundfahrt
9th Overall Tour of Austria
9th ZLM Tour
9th Chrono des Herbiers
2003
1st Stage 2 (TTT) Vuelta a Castilla y León
9th Grand Prix Eddy Merckx (with Vladimir Karpets)
10th Overall Volta a Catalunya
2004
5th Overall Vuelta a Murcia
5th Overall Tour de Suisse
9th Trofeo Città di Castelfidardo
2005
2nd Overall Giro del Trentino
2006
3rd Road race, National Road Championships
5th Overall Deutschland Tour
9th Coppa Ugo Agostoni
2007
2nd Time trial, National Road Championships
2nd Eindhoven Team Time Trial
3rd Gran Premio di Lugano
5th Overall Tour Méditerranéen
5th Gran Premio di Chiasso
7th Overall Giro d'Italia
8th Overall Tirreno–Adriatico
2008
10th Overall Giro del Trentino
2009
10th Overall Critérium International
2010
1st Stage 11 Giro d'Italia
9th Overall Giro del Trentino
2014
1st Stage 6 Tour of Austria

== See also ==
- List of doping cases in cycling
- List of sportspeople sanctioned for doping offences
