= Yuriy Krivtsov =

Ukrainian cyclist

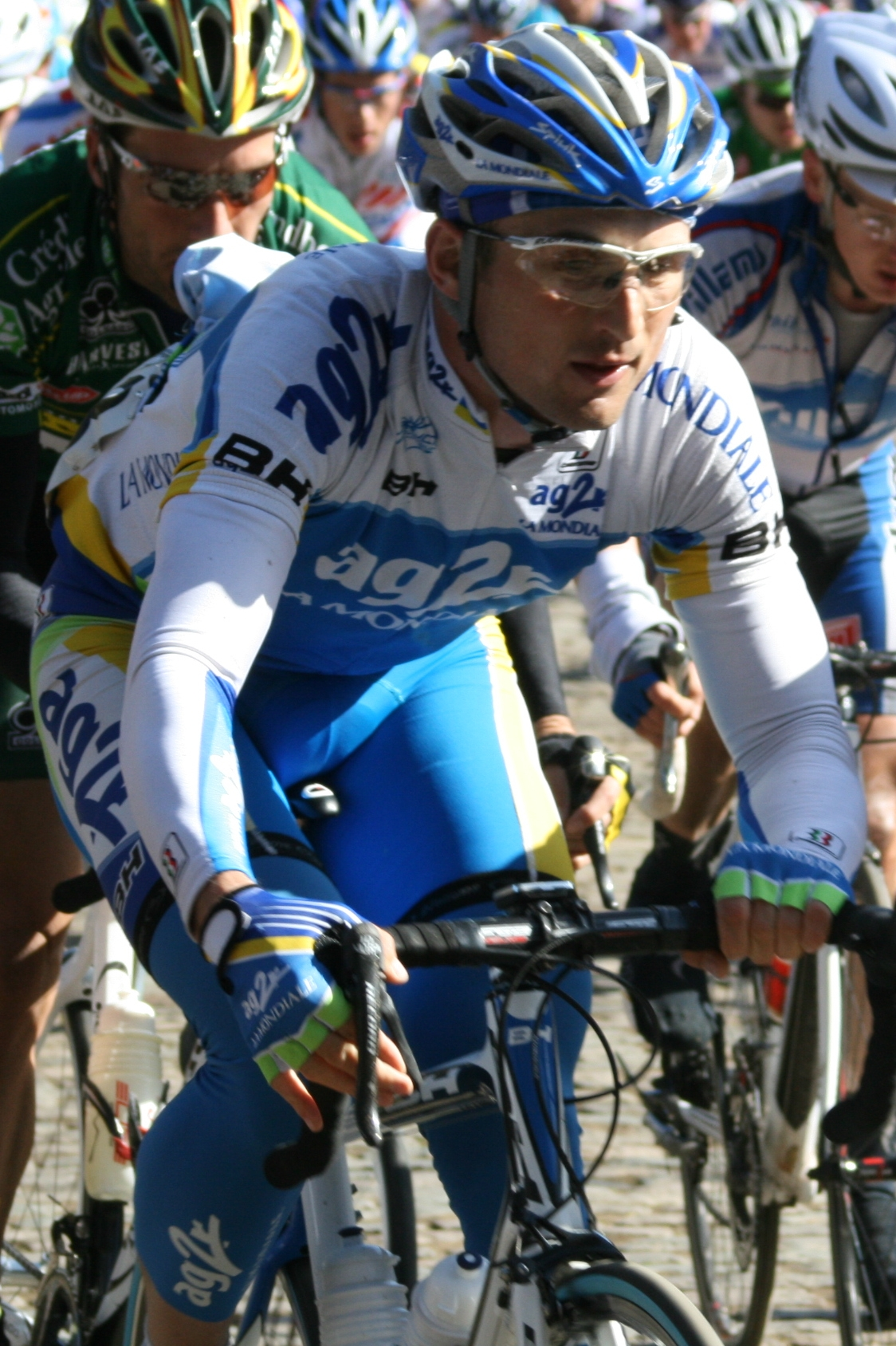
- Krivtsov at the 2009 Driedaagse van West-Vlaanderen.

Personal information
- Full name: Yuriy Krivtsov; Юрій Крівцов
- Born: 7 February 1979 (age 47) Pervomaysk, Ukrainian SSR, Soviet Union
- Height: 1.78 m (5 ft 10 in)
- Weight: 72 kg (159 lb)

Cycling career
- Sport: Cycling
- Discipline: Road
- Role: Rider

Professional teams
- 2002–2003: Jean Delatour
- 2004–2011: AG2R Prévoyance
- 2012: Lampre–ISD

Major wins
- 1 stage, Tour de Romandie; Ukrainian National Time Trial Champion (2004)

Yuriy Krivtsov (Ukrainian: Юрій Крівцов; born 7 February 1979) is a French professional road bicycle racer, who last rode for the Lampre–ISD team. Ukrainian by birth, he became a naturalized French citizen in May 2010, and was able to change his nationality per the UCI effective the 2011 season.

== Major results ==
1996

3rd, World U23 Time Trial Championships

2002
1st Prix des Blés d'Or
2003
1 stage, Tour de Romandie
1 stage, Circuit de la Sarthe
1 stage, Tour de l'Avenir
2004
1st National Time Trial Championships
4th Chrono des Herbiers
7th GP des Nations
2005
2nd Duo Normand (with Erki Pütsep)
4th Chrono Champenois
6th Grand Prix de Denain
6th Chrono des Herbiers
9th Overall Tour de Luxembourg
9th Overall Tour du Poitou-Charentes
2006
2nd National Time Trial Championships
6th Chrono des Nations
2007
4th Chrono des Nations
2008
4th Omloop Het Volk
2009
3rd Chrono des Nations
7th Overall Driedaagse van West-Vlaanderen
2010
2nd National Time Trial Championships
6th Duo Normand (with David Lelay)
9th Chrono des Nations
2011
8th Duo Normand (with David Lelay)
