= Bayern Rundfahrt =

German multi-day road cycling race

Race details
- Date: Late-May, Early-June
- Region: Bavaria, Germany
- English name: Tour of Bavaria
- Local name(s): Bayern Rundfahrt (in German)
- Discipline: Road
- Competition: UCI Europe Tour
- Type: Stage race
- Web site: www.bayern-rundfahrt.com

History
- First edition: 1980
- Editions: 36
- Final edition: 2015
- Most wins: Jens Voigt (GER); Michael Rich (GER) (3 wins)
- Final winner: Alex Dowsett (GBR)

The International Bayern Rundfahrt (English: Tour of Bavaria) was a stage race cycling race held each year in Bavaria, Germany, between 1980 and 2015. The race was held as an amateur race between 1980 and 1988, and from 2005 to 2015, the race was organised as a 2.HC event on the UCI Europe Tour. In December 2015, the organisers cancelled the 2016 event due to a budget shortfall, and the race has not been held since.

== Winners (from 1989) ==
=== By year ===
| Year | Country | Rider | Team |
|---|---|---|---|
| 1989 | West Germany | Kai Hundertmarck | |
| 1990 | West Germany | Jörg Paffrath | |
| 1991 | Canada | Brian Walton | |
| 1992 | Switzerland | Jacques Jolidon | |
| 1993 | Germany | Alexander Kastenhuber | |
| 1994 | Czech Republic | Pavel Padrnos | |
| 1995 | Germany | Timo Scholz | |
| 1996 | Germany | Uwe Peschel | |
| 1997 | Germany | Christian Henn | Team Telekom |
| 1998 | Norway | Steffen Kjærgaard | Team Chicky World |
| 1999 | Germany | Rolf Aldag | Team Telekom |
| 2000 | Germany | Jens Voigt | Crédit Agricole |
| 2001 | Germany | Jens Voigt | Crédit Agricole |
| 2002 | Germany | Michael Rich | Gerolsteiner |
| 2003 | Germany | Michael Rich | Gerolsteiner |
| 2004 | Germany | Jens Voigt | Team CSC |
| 2005 | Germany | Michael Rich | Gerolsteiner |
| 2006 | Spain | José Alberto Martínez | Agritubel |
| 2007 | Germany | Stefan Schumacher | Gerolsteiner |
| 2008 | Germany | Christian Knees | Team Milram |
| 2009 | Germany | Linus Gerdemann | Team Milram |
| 2010 | Belgium | Maxime Monfort | Team HTC–Columbia |
| 2011 | Great Britain | Geraint Thomas | Team Sky |
| 2012 | Australia | Michael Rogers | Team Sky |
| 2013 | Italy | Adriano Malori | Lampre–Merida |
| 2014 | Great Britain | Geraint Thomas | Team Sky |
| 2015 | Great Britain | Alex Dowsett | Movistar Team |

=== Multiple winners ===
| Wins | Rider | Editions |
|---|---|---|
| 3 | Jens Voigt (GER) | 2000, 2001, 2004 |
| 3 | Michael Rich (GER) | 2002, 2003, 2005 |
| 2 | Geraint Thomas (GBR) | 2011, 2014 |

Riders in italic are still active.

=== Wins per country ===
| Wins | Country |
|---|---|
| 16 | Germany |
| 3 | United Kingdom |
| 1 | Australia; Belgium; Canada; Czech Republic; Italy; Norway; Spain; Switzerland |
