= Jens Voigt =

German road bicycle racer and cycling broadcaster (born 1971)

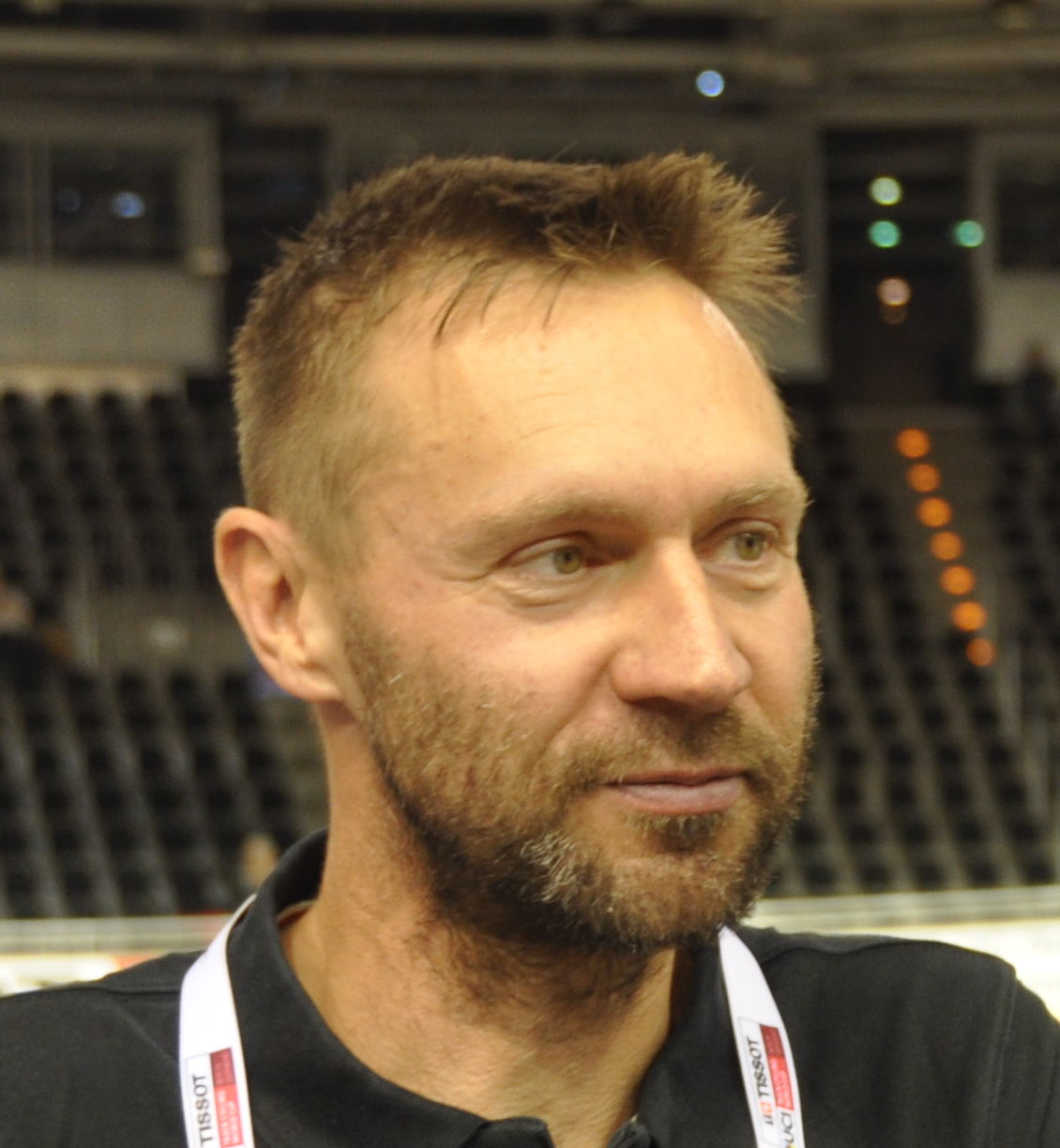
- Voigt at the 2018–2019 UCI Track World Cup in Berlin

Personal information
- Full name: Jens Voigt
- Born: 17 September 1971 (age 55) Grevesmühlen, East Germany
- Height: 1.90 m (6 ft 3 in)
- Weight: 77 kg (170 lb; 12 st 2 lb)

Cycling career
- Sport: Cycling
- Discipline: Road
- Role: Rider
- Rider type: Breakaway specialist Rouleur

Amateur team
- TSC Berlin

Professional teams
- 1997: Giant-AIS Cycling Team
- 1998–2003: GAN
- 2004–2010: Team CSC
- 2011–2014: Leopard Trek

Major wins
- Grand Tours Tour de France 2 individual stages (2001, 2006) 1 TTT (2001) Giro d'Italia 1 individual stage (2008) Stage races Tour de Pologne (2008) Critérium International (1999, 2004, 2007–2009) Deutschland Tour (2006, 2007) Bayern Rundfahrt (2000, 2001, 2004) Tour Méditerranéen (2005) One-day races and Classics Grand Prix des Nations (2001) Paris–Bourges (2003) Duo Normand (1999, 2001) World Hour record 18 September 2014, 51.110 km (31.758 mi)

Jens Voigt (German: [jɛns ˈfoːkt]; born 17 September 1971) is a German former professional road bicycle racer and, upon retirement, became a cycling sports broadcast commentator. During his cycling career, Voigt raced for several teams, the last one being UCI ProTeam Trek Factory Racing. Voigt wore the yellow jersey of the Tour de France twice, though he was never a contender for the overall title owing to the mountainous nature of the stages of the race being better suited to climbing specialists. His career achievements include winning the Critérium International a record-tying five times and a number of one-week stage races, as well as two Tour de France stage victories. In September 2014, he set a new hour record.

Among cycling fans, Voigt was generally popular, both for his aggressive riding style and his affable, forthright and articulate manners in dealing with the public and media. He speaks fluent French and English, in addition to his native German.

== Early life ==
Voigt was born in Grevesmühlen, now in the state of Mecklenburg-Vorpommern, then in East Germany, about 100 kilometres (62 mi) north-east of Hamburg, in the same area as Tour de France winner Jan Ullrich. Voigt was encouraged by his parents to participate in sports, since he often got into trouble as a youngster thanks to his excessive energy. His early performance indicated he had good endurance potential, and he joined a national sports school at age 14 and trained in cycling and track and field.

== Career ==
=== Debut ===
Voigt won the Peace Race in 1994 and topped the UCI "Challenge Mondial Amateurs" rankings in December 1994. After a four-year stint in the German Army, much of it spent with a special sports unit, he started professional cycling in 1997, winning races for the Australian team ZVVZ-Giant-Australian Institute of Sport.

In 1998, with the support of his former Australian Institute of Sport Sports Director, German-born Heiko Salzwedel, he moved to the big French team GAN (which became Crédit Agricole) where he spent the five years amassing 20 wins, among them a day in the maillot jaune in the 2001 Tour de France and a stage in that same Tour. Voigt played a part in Jan Ullrich's 2000 Olympic Games win for the German team.

=== 2004–2010 (Team CSC) ===
In 2004, Voigt joined his former Crédit Agricole teammate Bobby Julich with a move to Team CSC. Being tempo specialists, they formed a strong pair as they dominated the 2004 and 2005 LuK Challenge race, a two-man time trial.

Voigt rode the 2004 Tour de France for Team CSC captain Ivan Basso. Voigt and teammate Jakob Piil were often in breakaways, covering the break for CSC. On the 15th stage, Voigt was in a break as Ullrich attacked up the Col de l'Echarasson, leaving race leader Lance Armstrong and second-placed Basso. With Armstrong's team unable to pull Ullrich back in, Voigt was ordered back from his breakaway to help Basso defend his place. Voigt saw Ullrich ride past as he waited for his captain, before he single-handedly closed the gap to Ullrich. Next day was a time trial up the Alpe d'Huez with 900,000 spectators at the roadside. Voigt was heckled by German fans calling him Judas for his effort to ruin fellow German Ullrich's chances. Voigt criticised German TV-channel ARD for starting a witch-hunt against him and pleaded that he was paid by Team CSC, not Germany and that (as he stated in the documentary Overcoming) thanks to his help, Ullrich won his olympic gold medal in 2000.

At the start of 2005, Voigt won the Tour Méditerranéen, ahead of teammates Fränk Schleck 2nd and Nicki Sørensen 4th. Voigt won the first UCI ProTour event, the prologue time trial of the 2005 Paris–Nice, a race Bobby Julich won overall. Voigt nearly won the 2005 classic Liège–Bastogne–Liège when he was beaten on the line by Alexander Vinokourov, Voigt having been on a breakaway almost the entire race.

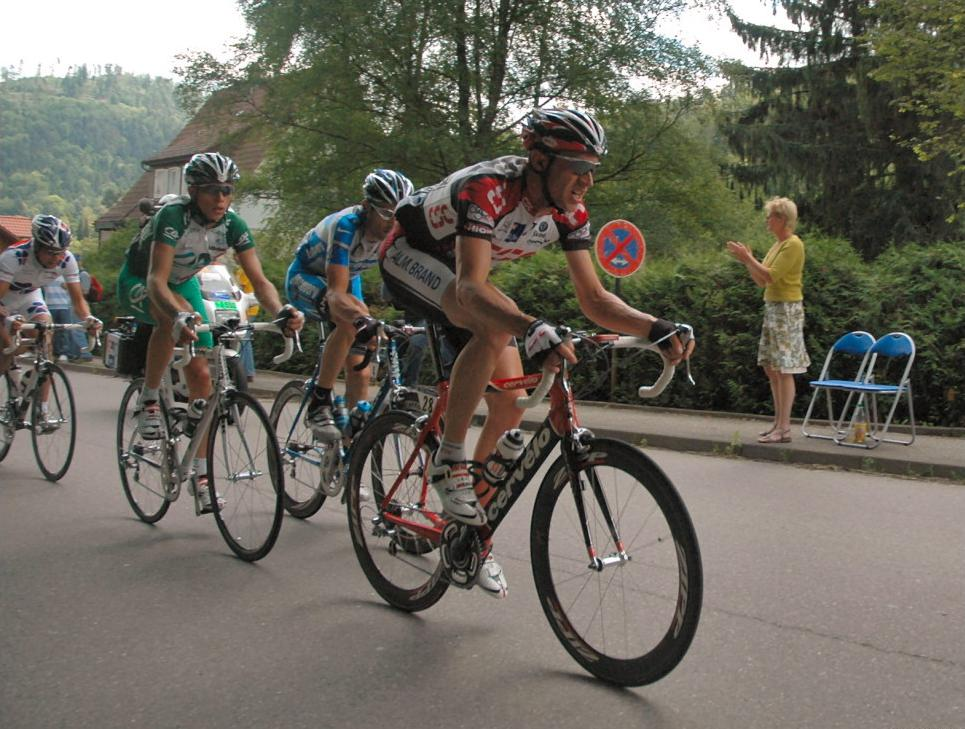
Voigt (front) at the 2005 Tour de France; he held the overall lead of the race for one day, after the ninth stage.

After a strong placing in the stage 1 time trial of the 2005 Tour de France, Voigt was only trailing race leader Armstrong by 1 minute and he tried hard to take the overall lead. He took part in many attacks, before the first rest day on the 9th stage, he finally got in a break-away that lasted to the line. He finished third, 3 minutes ahead of Armstrong. Voigt's time in the maillot jaune would be short-lived however, as he fell to 168th at stage 10 after a fever, and he was eliminated for failing to finish stage 11 within the time limit. Voigt ended 2005 as 29th on the UCI ProTour individual rankings.

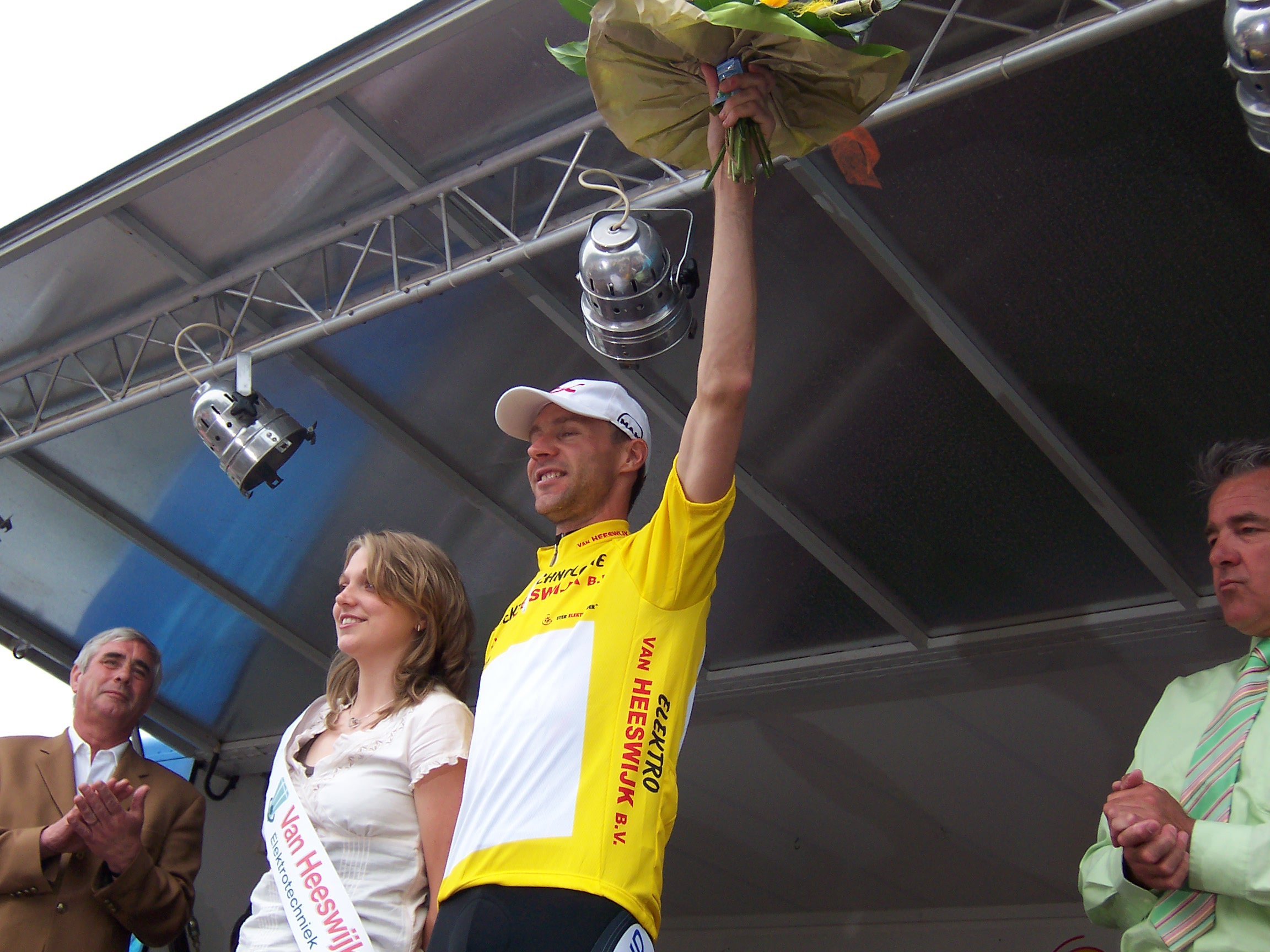
Voigt at the 2006 Ster Elektrotoer; he held the race lead after the second stage, before finishing tenth overall.

The 2006 season started at a slower pace for Voigt compared to 2005 in order to save energy and be in a position to help Basso in his quest to win the 2006 Giro d'Italia and 2006 Tour de France races. His only result until the Giro in May was an attack on the fifth stage of the Tour of the Basque Country, but he had to settle for second behind stage winner Thomas Voeckler.

For the Giro d'Italia, Voigt rode in support of Basso. Following Team CSC's team time trial win on stage 5, Voigt found himself second, trailing race leader Serhiy Honchar by six seconds. During the first mountains, Voigt helped Basso take the overall lead, while he slid down the board and finished 37th. On mountainous stage 19, Voigt and Julich were in a 20-man break, but as Team CSC was leading the peloton to defend Basso's first place, Voigt and Julich did not work. Up the last climb, Voigt was alone with Spanish rider Juan Manuel Gárate, but as Voigt did not think he had done enough to deserve the victory, he let Garate take the win. Voigt finally got his first win of the season in the Ster Elektrotoer race in June. There he won stage 4 and helped teammate Kurt Asle Arvesen to the overall win, two weeks before the Tour de France.

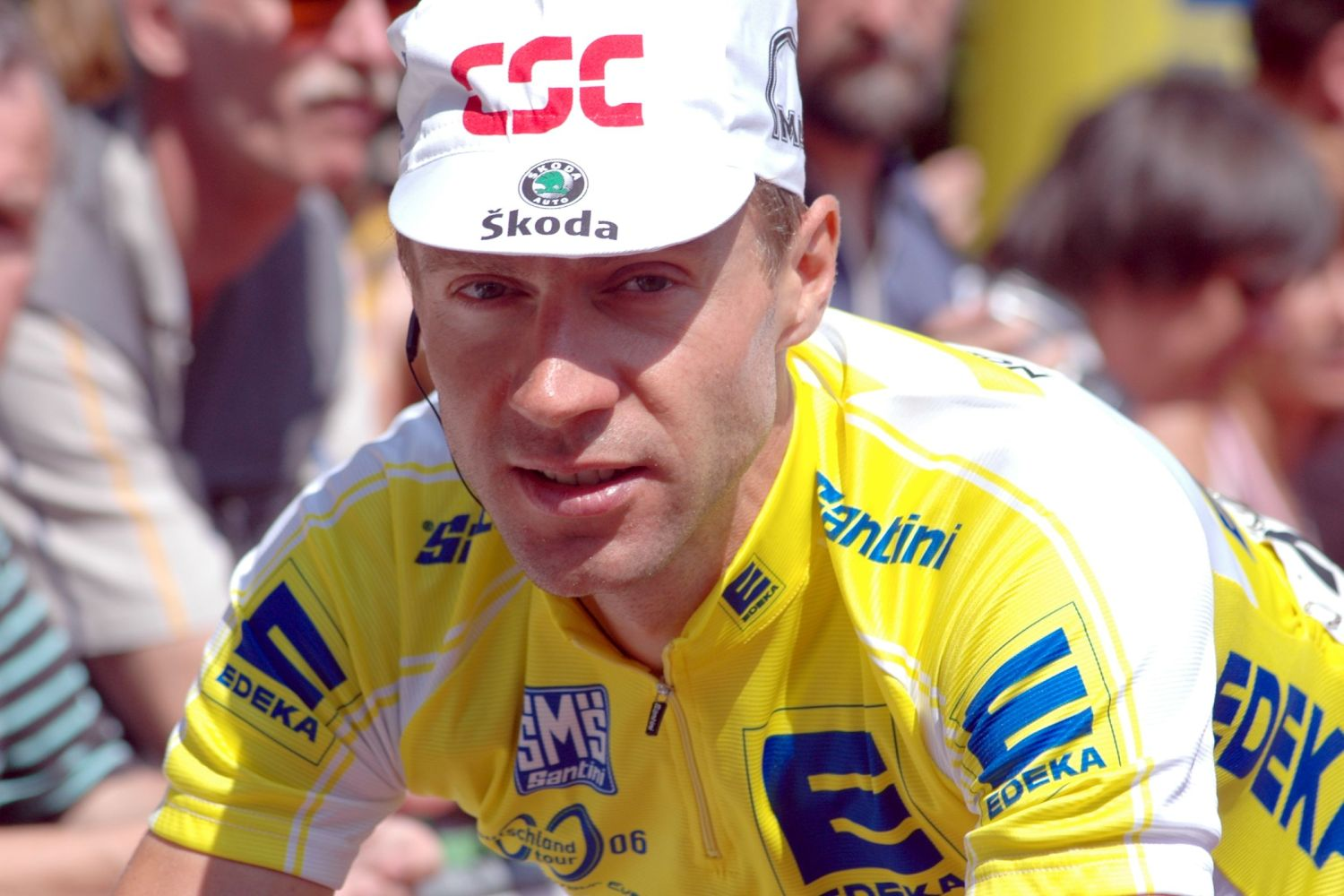
Voigt at the 2006 Deutschland Tour, wearing the leader's jersey.

In the days before the Tour, Basso was suspended by Team CSC after his name had been brought up in the Operación Puerto doping investigation. Carlos Sastre became team captain. Voigt took the role of early attacker, to lessen the load for the team, and he formed or joined unsuccessful breakaways on several stages. On the memorable stage 13 from Béziers to Montélimar, the longest stage of the 2006 Tour at 231 km (144 mi), Voigt got in a five-man breakaway which finished 29 minutes and 58 seconds ahead of the main bunch. At the line, Voigt outsprinted Óscar Pereiro to take his second Tour stage win. On stage 15, Voigt helped Fränk Schleck from Luxembourg, pulling hard in the break with teammate David Zabriskie of the US, which eventually gave Schleck the win. Voigt finished the 2006 Tour 53rd, helping Sastre finish 4th.

In February 2007, Voigt won the third stage of the Tour of California, which had numerous climbs. After the bunch caught 17 escapees, Levi Leipheimer of Discovery Channel attacked, and only Chris Horner (Predictor–Lotto) and Voigt could keep up with him. Voigt ultimately prevailed in the sprint over the two men and approached to only 3 seconds behind Leipheimer for the General Classification thanks to time bonuses. He managed to hold on to his second place over the next 4 stages, finishing 21 seconds behind the winner of the Tour, Leipheimer. In April, he met another success at the Critérium International, winning the overall classification and stage 2, a short, undulating stage of 98.5 km (61.2 mi) finishing in Monthermé. Voigt attacked near the Côte du Mont Malgré Tout, with almost 25 km (16 mi) to go, and crossed the finish line solo, 48 seconds in front of the chasers. The last stage of the race was a short individual time trial of 8.3 km (5.2 mi) which was raced in the afternoon of the same day, and Voigt stated he gave everything he had but was very careful while negotiating the turns. He finished seventh, keeping his leader's jersey and winning the 3-stage race, while the Swede Thomas Lövkvist of Française des Jeux took second place. Another major win of the 2007 season came for him in the Deutschland Tour, which he won for the second year in a row, with Levi Leipheimer taking second place at 1'57" and David Lopez of Caisse d'Epargne completing the overall classification podium. Voigt stated that his victory was harder to accomplish than the preceding year, when it was somewhat of a surprise. He was a marked man.

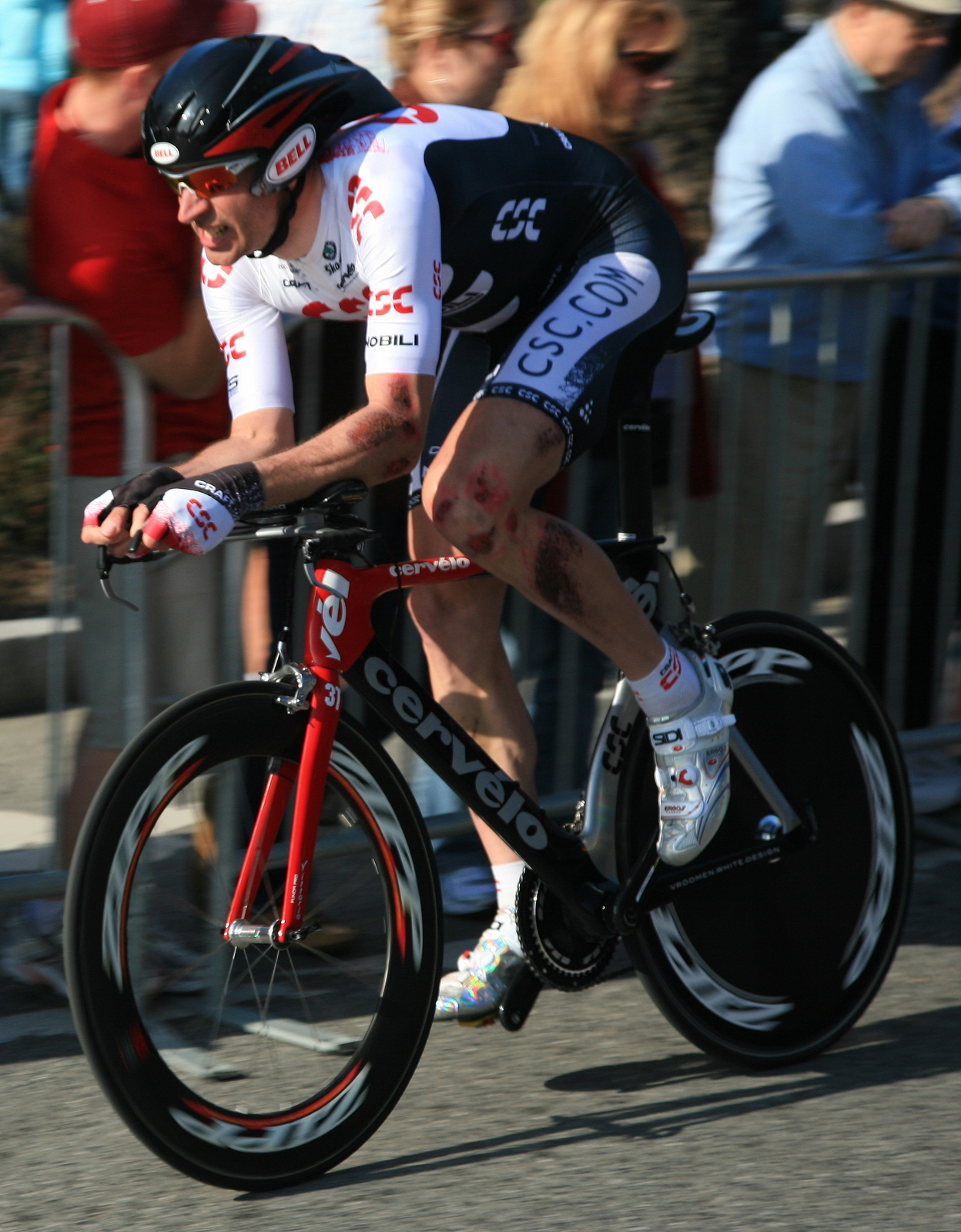
Voigt at the 2008 Tour of California; he competed in the race despite an accident during training the week before the race.

Voigt began his 2008 season by taking part in the Paris–Nice and the Tour of California, where he did not obtain high personal results. In March, Voigt grabbed his fourth success on the short stage race Critérium International, registering a victory on stage 2 in the process. Another success awaited him at the stage 18 of the Giro d'Italia. He was part of a group that broke away from the field a mere 6 km (3.7 mi) into the stage. With 36 km (22 mi) to cover and a six minutes lead, Voigt left the breakaway and soloed to victory in Varese. In June, he came in fifth position of his National Road Race Championship and sixth in his National Time Trial. He was a big part of his team successes in the Tour de France, protecting the leader Carlos Sastre, who won the eighteenth stage atop the Alpe d'Huez climb. Before that decisive stage, the team was counting on a triple threat as far as leaders for the general classification went, with the Schleck brothers, who took fourth and sixth on that mountain stage. Sastre would go on to win the Tour, and the CSC team won the overall team classification. Voigt was selected to represent Germany in the Beijing Olympic Games along with Fabian Wegmann, Gerald Ciolek, Bert Grabsch and Stefan Schumacher. He took part in the road race, which he did not finish. He then dominated the Tour of Poland, earning an individual stage and helping his squad win the Team Time Trial in the process. Citing a long and draining season, Voigt declined to participate in the World Championships, a decision that his team approved.

Voigt began the 2009 season well by winning the Critérium International for the fifth time in his career, tying Frenchman Raymond Poulidor's record while grabbing a stage win, the points classification and the mountains classification. He abandoned the 2009 Tour on 21 July 2009 as a consequence of a violent crash suffered while descending the Col du Petit-Saint-Bernard with the yellow jersey group during stage 16. He incurred a fracture of the right cheekbone and concussion. He had to skip several races to recuperate from his injuries, including the Cycling World Championship held in Mendrisio, Switzerland. He was inactive for a 6-week period and came back to competition at the Tour of Missouri, where he got a warm welcome from cycling fans.

Voigt began his last season with team manager Bjarne Riis (2010) by participating in the Tour Down Under and the Vuelta a Mallorca. He got his first top ten result of the year in the Vuelta a Andalucia, just short of the podium in fourth position. In March, Voigt participated in Paris–Nice, where he finished second of the prologue and grabbed the yellow jersey after the third stage, which was shortened 53 km (33 mi) due to snowfall. He lost the jersey the very next day to eventual winner Alberto Contador, but managed to finish fifth overall after Alejandro Valverde's second place was annulled for his implication in the Operación Puerto doping case. Voigt then headed to the Volta a Catalunya, where he won stage 4 after escaping from the peloton to join a group of four riders on the last ascent of the day. He eventually was left with only Rein Taaramäe to worry about, and won the sprint against the Cofidis rider. In May, he scored a sixth place overall in the Tour of California thanks to consistent placings in the hilly stages and finishing fifth in the individual time trial held in Los Angeles. He participated to the Tour de France as a domestique to his leaders, the Schleck brothers. Voigt survived a scare on the mountainous stage 16, where he crashed heavily on the descent of the Col de Peyresourde, destroying his bike. After getting back up, he realized that all the team cars had passed and that he would not be handed a new bike. Desperate, he borrowed a child's bike much too small for him, from a children group's car which was following the race. He rode on it for about 15 km (9.3 mi) before reaching a policeman who had another bicycle which had been left for him by his team. His teammate Andy Schleck finished the Tour in second place, but was later given the title since the original winner Alberto Contador tested positive to clenbuterol.

=== 2011–2014 (Leopard Trek) ===
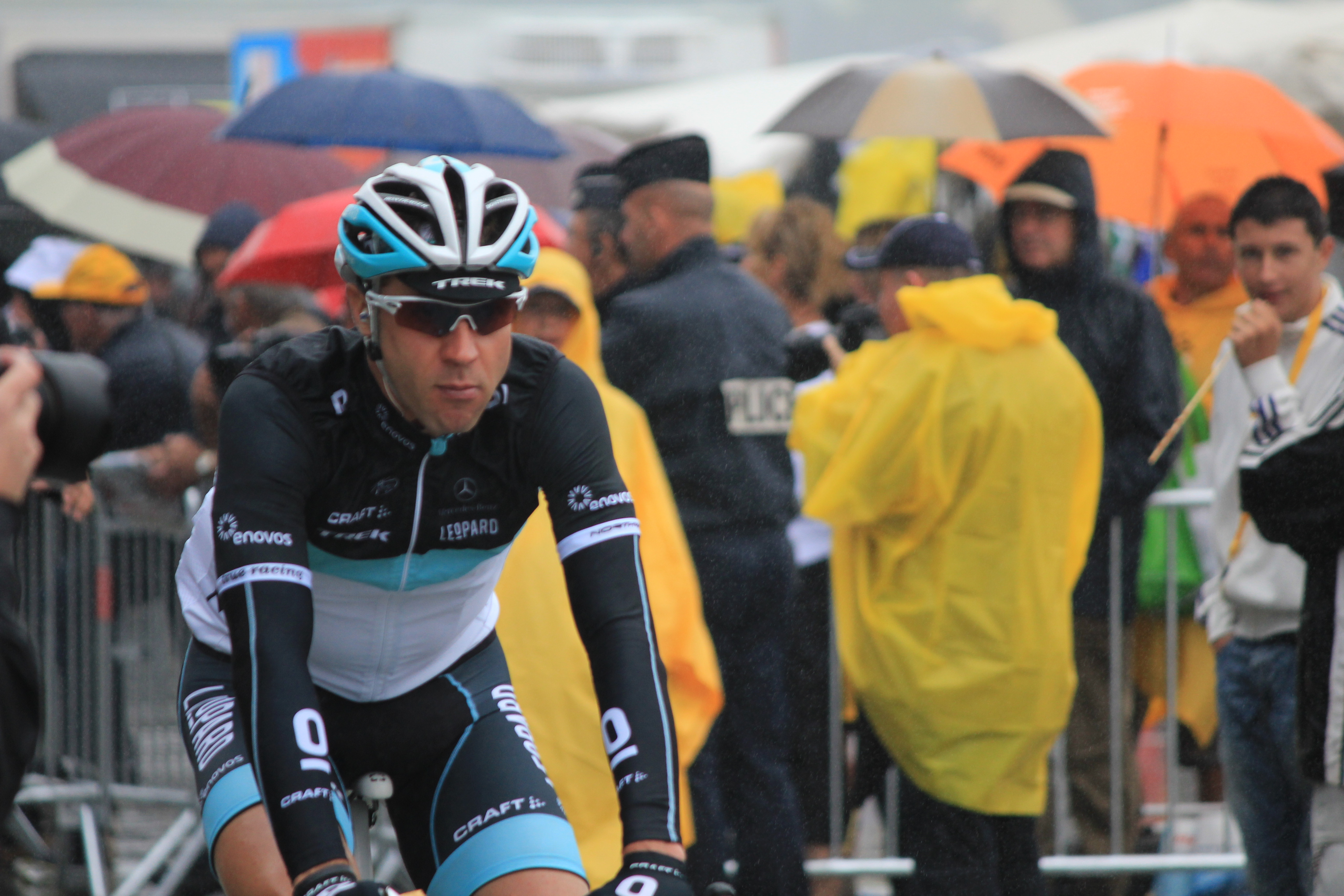
Voigt at the 2011 Tour de France.

Shut up legs!

— Jens Voigt's "trademark" catchphrase

The 2011 season was to be the first one of his career in which he would not achieve a victory. He joined the newly formed Leopard Trek, following the Schleck brothers, Fabian Cancellara and four other riders coming from his 2010 team, Team Saxo Bank. Kim Andersen was the creator of that new team, being himself a former Saxo Bank manager. In the spring, he took part in Paris–Nice, taking the sixth place of the first stage, and then went on to help his teammate Fränk Schleck win the Critérium International. In May, he suffered a fracture to his scaphoid in a crash during the Tour of California, riding a whole stage with the injury before doctors discovered it with X-Rays. He healed in time for the Tour de France, ready to sacrifice himself and put any personal ambitions aside to help his leaders, the Schleck brothers. He played a pivotal role in helping the pair reach the second and third steps of the podium behind BMC Racing Team's Cadel Evans. In August, Voigt went to the USA Pro Challenge, and had some good results by taking the fifth place of the prologue and then finishing eighth in the individual time trial. Designated to lead his squad in the Tour of Britain, Voigt suffered his second broken bone of the year in that race, this time a finger bone. The injury occurred in a crash on the first stage and he had to abandon. The healing process was a slow one since it took almost a month for a complete recovery to be achieved.

Voigt (right) at the 2012 Tour Down Under.

In 2012, Voigt was the oldest rider of the World Tour teams at 40 years of age when the season started. That did not stop him from going into a long breakaway on the sixth stage of Paris–Nice. After every rider had been dropped but one, Voigt was beaten in a sprint by Luis León Sánchez of the Rabobank team. In April, Voigt participated to the Tour of the Basque Country, where a peculiar incident occurred. Voigt signed in late for a stage start, then had a bit of a verbal match against an official who complained about his lateness. He was fined sign: Fr. or SFr. or FS 1,000 Swiss francs for what was described as "comportamiento incorrecto" (bad behavior) in a report. He later had a good showing at the Tour of California, where he came in second of the fifth stage, an individual time trial contested in Bakersfield, 23 seconds behind David Zabriskie. He was also part of breakaways and paced the bunch often. On the Tour de France, he finished in third position of the tenth stage. He was dropped on the slopes of the Col du Grand Colombier, but came back on the four escapees before competing in the final sprint. In August, during a press conference prior to the Tour of Utah, he announced that he would continue racing through the 2013 season. In the same month, Voigt took the fourth stage of the USA Pro Cycling Challenge finishing in Beaver Creek. He attacked his breakaway companions on Independence Pass, which was situated in the first third of the race, and then soloed on to victory with almost three minutes of an advantage over the chasers. He raced more than 100 km (62 mi) alone, taking one of the most epic victory of his career.

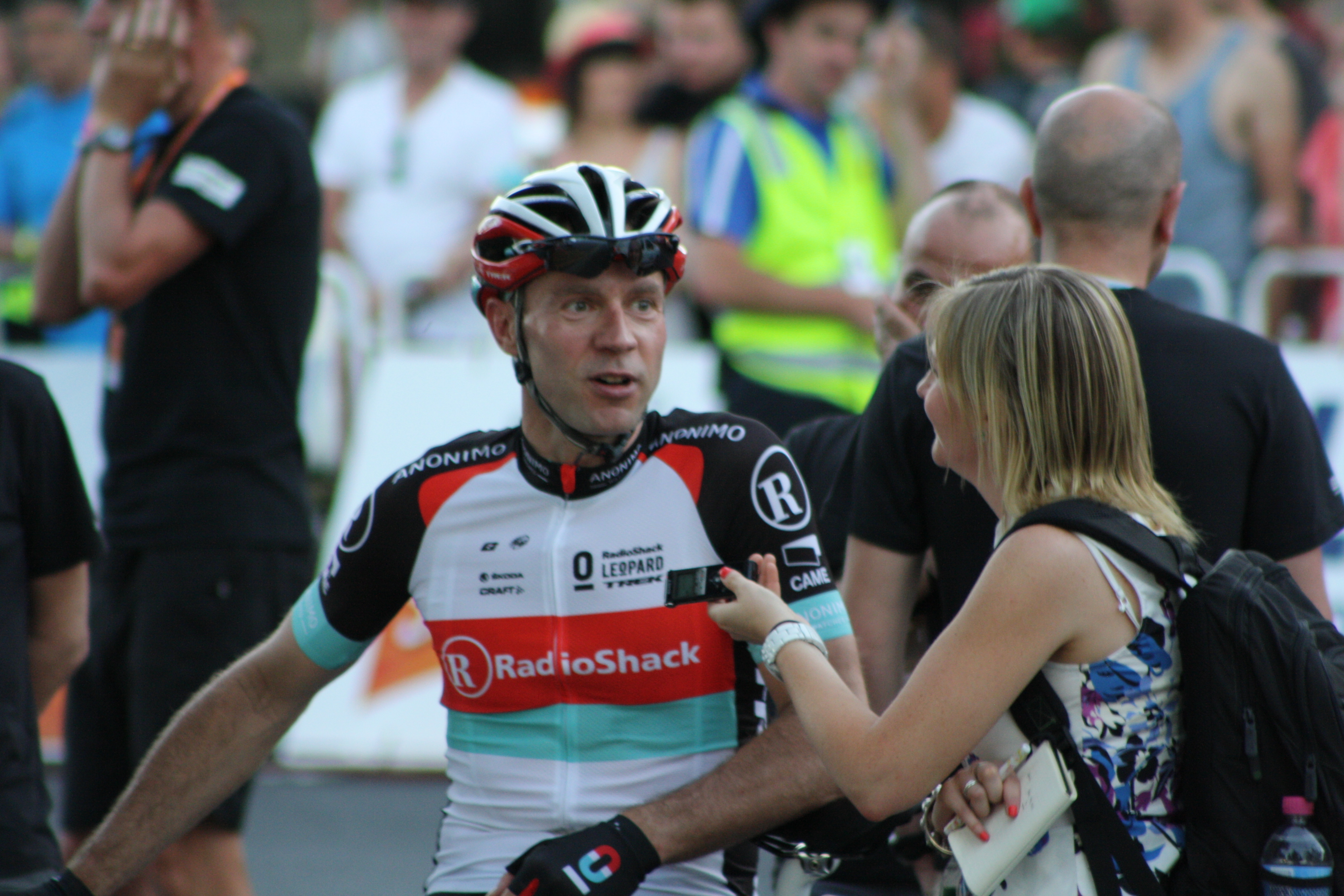
Voigt being interviewed at the 2013 People's Choice Classic

In May 2013, at the Tour of California, Voigt contributed to creating an echelon on stage 5, splitting the peloton in half with 55 km (34 mi) to race. The 18 riders group stayed away until Voigt attacked with 5 km (3.1 mi) to race, winning solo in Avila Beach. Even at 41 years of age, he attacked on the penultimate stage of Tour de France, and won the combative award of the day before he was caught by the overall contenders, just a few kilometres into the final ascent.

Voigt was selected by Trek Factory Racing as part of their team for the 2014 Tour de France, giving him a 17th start on the Grande Boucle, matching the record for Tour starts held by George Hincapie and Stuart O'Grady. He was part of the break on Stage 1 of the tour, winning the combativity prize for the stage and taking the lead in the king of the mountains competition. As a mark of respect, the peloton let Voigt ride at the front on the first lap of the circuit in the Champs-Élysées in Paris where the race concludes, then battled for the sprint, won by Marcel Kittel.

Voigt announced ahead of the 2014 USA Pro Cycling Challenge that the race would be his last as a professional. He almost won Stage 4 in that last race thanks to a day-long breakaway. He was joined by the raging peloton with only 900 meters to go. Before the last stage of the race, Voigt was asked in an interview with Outside Magazine: Americans also like your panache, the fact that you’re willing to go out on a break all day and attack. Where did you get that trait? to which he answered:

Early in my career, at some of my first races, I realized that attacking is just my nature. I am a person that acts instead of reacts. It's the same with a lot of things in life. If you come to a room where nobody knows anybody else, instead of having an embarrassing silence, I just break the silence and chat up the first person next to me. It's the same in cycling. I like to make things happen.

In December 2014 Trek Factory Racing announced that Voigt would stay with the team as a coach, with a view to becoming a directeur sportif.

== 2015 and beyond ==
In February 2015, it was announced that Voigt would be the official ambassador of the Tour of California. He also served as a television analyst and an adviser to the organizers.

In June 2015, it was announced that Voigt would host an annual Gran Fondo in Marin County, labeled The Jensie Gran Fondo of Marin.

In January 2017, Voigt completed an Everesting on Berlin's Teufelsberg, raising over €29,000 for Australia's Tour de Cure. Teufelsberg's climb is 90 metres (300 ft), so nearly 100 laps were required to reach the equivalent of Mount Everest's 8,848 metres (29,029 ft). Voight's Fitbit data showed he rode 400 km (250 mi) in 26.5 hours, climbing 29,527 feet (9,000 m). The weather conditions included snow and low temperatures of 3 °C (37 °F). Voigt has ridden in the Tour de Cure Signature Tour annually since 2015.

== Hour record ==
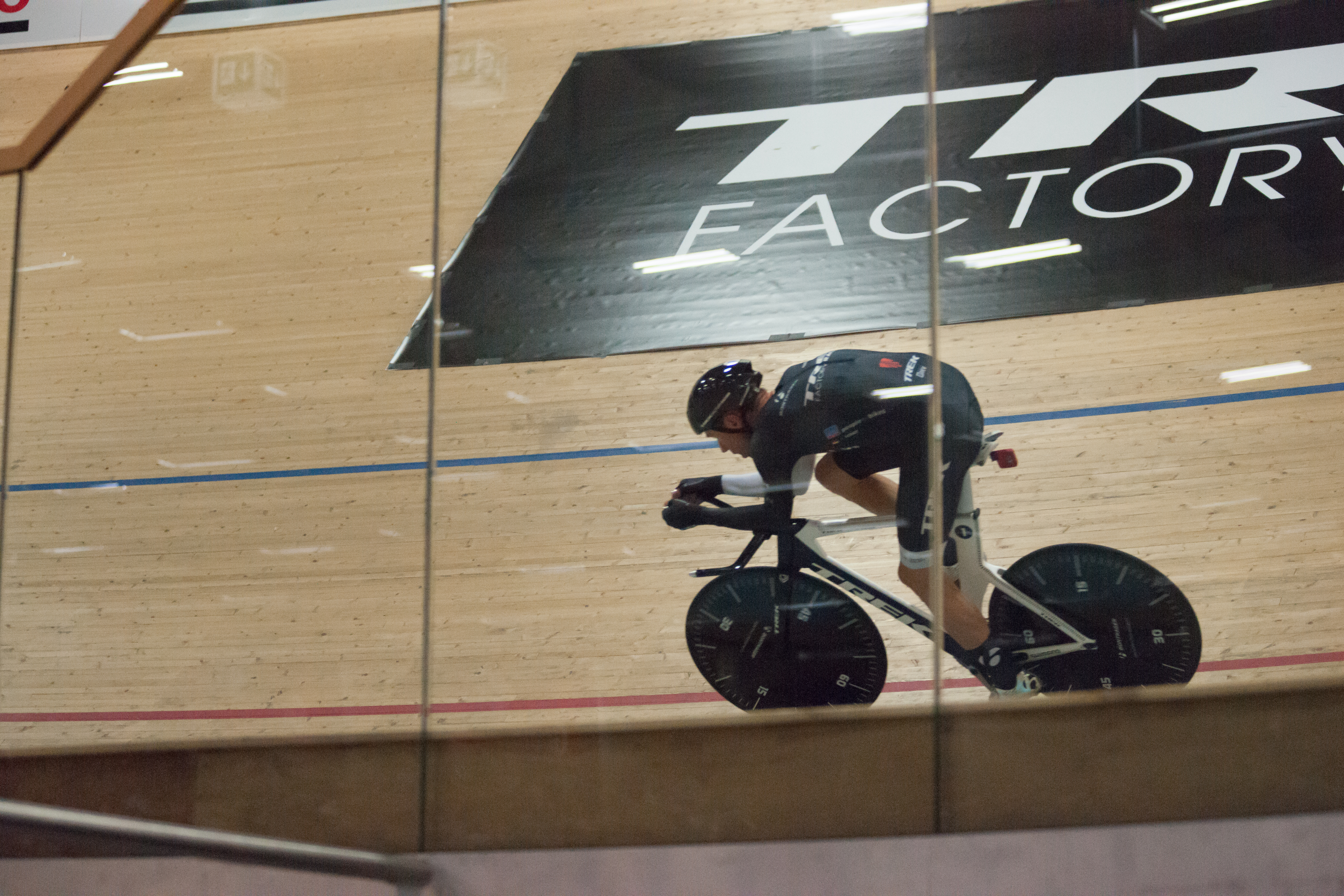
Jens Voigt during the hour record attempt

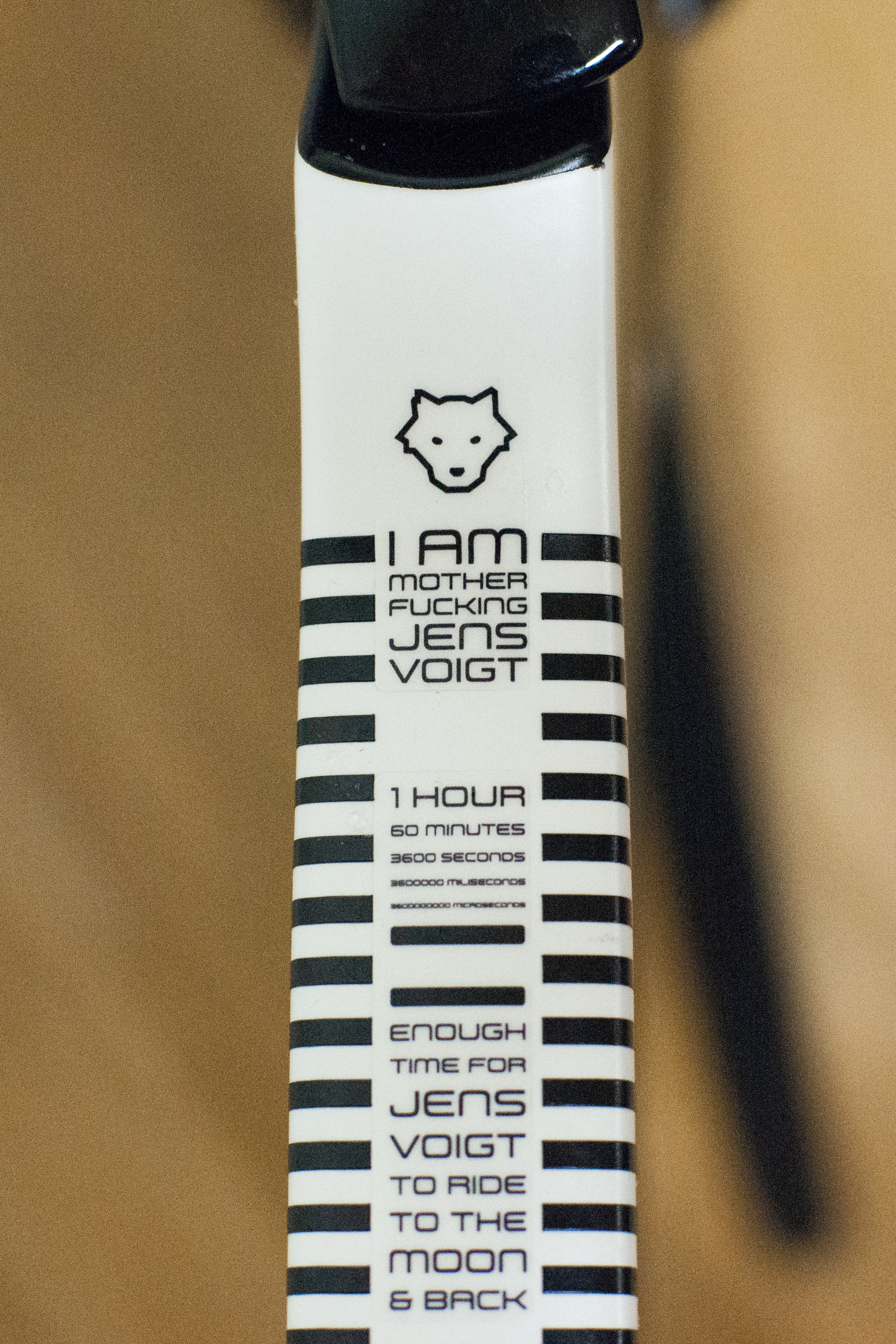
Detail of Voigt's custom Trek track bike used for the record

It's a huge challenge for me, both physical and mental. [...] We have been doing some discrete tests in the velodrome in Roubaix prior to the Dauphiné [cycling race] and we believe that I have a fair chance.

— Jens Voigt

On 3 September 2014, Voigt announced that he would try to beat the UCI hour record of 49.7 km (30.9 mi) held by Ondřej Sosenka. The record attempt took place on 18 September 2014 in the Vélodrome Suisse in Grenchen. Jens Voigt's plans to attempt the record were hatched in June 2014 and followed some of the planning that was made for Fabian Cancellara's possible crack at the record. At 43 years old, Voigt had to work on his position on his bike to improve his aerodynamics. The bike on which the German rode was revealed on 12 September 2014. The attempt occurred on the day after Voigt's 43rd birthday and was broadcast live by Eurosport and the UCI channel on YouTube. Prior to the attempt, some prominent cycling personalities such as Bradley Wiggins, Eddy Merckx and Chris Boardman expressed the opinion that Voigt had a fair chance of beating the 49.7 km (30.9 mi) mark.

The record attempt was successful. In front of an audience of 1600 people, Voigt rode 51.110 km (31.758 mi) during the course of an hour, beating the previous record by 1.41 km (0.88 mi). He reached the previous mark on the 199th lap of the velodrome, with 1:28 remaining. Voigt used a modified version of the Trek Speed Concept frame, with dual disc wheels and standard aero bars. He also used a front gearing of 54 teeth and a rear gearing of 14 teeth. Voigt stood up on his machine a couple of times during the event. He was faster at the end of the attempt, as he covered some laps (250 meters) in under 17 seconds. Voigt is the oldest rider to ever beat the record and his average power output was 412 watts. He is also the first German to hold the record. The UCI president, Brian Cookson, believed that this event could be the start of a cascade of attempts by other riders who perform well in time trials.

I gave it everything in the last 20 minutes. I knew that I still had the energy, that I was ahead of the mark. I felt euphoric – it was the last 20 minutes of my sporting career.

— Jens Voigt

Setting the hour record capped a 17-year career in which he is estimated to have bicycled 850,000 km (ca. 528,000 miles). (Note: Possibly a source for the enigmatic 'lunar exploit' boast on his record breaking bike.) Voigt's record stood until 30 October 2014, when it was broken by Austrian cyclist Matthias Brändle.

== Doping views ==
Voigt never tested positive to performance-enhancing drugs in his career. He alleged that he never doped and was always against the practice. At the end of October 2012, he wrote a blog entry to address the turmoil caused by the Lance Armstrong–USADA doping affair, and related in it his personal experiences, stating that he "just never doped". Voigt argued that it was impossible for him to imagine that he would be regarded as a doper and cheater by his children if he took performance-enhancing drugs.

Tyler Hamilton felt Voigt was jeopardizing his fight against doping in autumn 2012. While Hamilton has no proof, he is convinced that Voigt doped. Voigt reacted by saying that he never heard about doping while he was on the CSC team. Hamilton felt this statement was like "spitting in my face", and "the most ridiculous thing I read in my life".

== Personal life ==
Voigt and his wife Stephanie have six children, the youngest born January 2011. They live in Berlin, Germany. Voigt thinks he is "just above the dog" in the hierarchy of his family but he likes it. After his career, he worked as a TV presenter in Germany and in the US. In the US he was part of the NBC Sports coverage team which was led by Phil Liggett and Paul Sherwen, and latterly led by Liggett and Bob Roll with added commentary from Voigt, Steve Porino, Christian Vande Velde, Paul Burmeister and Chris Horner. Jens subsequently has worked as an analyst for German Eurosport and also as an in race expert on the motorbike for major races for the channel's English language brands. Jens has also co-presented a podcast with his former teammate Bobby Julich since 2021, initially called Bobby and Jens and produced with US brand Velonews the podcast has been independent since 2024 as The Odd Tandem and features interviews in English with current and former professional riders.

== Career achievements ==
=== Major results ===
1994
1st Overall Peace Race
1st Overall Niedersachsen-Rundfahrt
1995
2nd Overall Tour de Normandie
1996
1st Overall Sachsen-Tour
1st Stage 1 Rheinland-Pfalz Rundfahrt
8th Overall Peace Race
1997
1st Overall Niedersachsen-Rundfahrt

1st Stage 5b

1st Prologue Sachsen Tour
2nd Overall Tour de Langkawi
3rd Overall Peace Race
1998
1st Stage 5a Tour of the Basque Country
1st Points classification Prudential Tour
7th Overall Critérium du Dauphiné Libéré
7th Grand Prix d'Ouverture La Marseillaise
8th Overall Étoile de Bessèges
8th Overall Rheinland-Pfalz Rundfahrt
Tour de France

Held after Stage 9

1999
1st Overall Critérium International
1st Breitling Grand Prix
1st Stage 3 Route du Sud
1st Duo Normand (with Chris Boardman)
2nd Overall Étoile de Bessèges
2nd Grand Prix d'Ouverture La Marseillaise
3rd Overall Circuit de la Sarthe
3rd Overall Tour de Pologne
3rd Grand Prix Eddy Merckx
3rd Grand Prix des Nations
9th Time trial, UCI Road World Championships
9th Overall Paris–Nice
9th La Flèche Wallonne
2000
1st Overall Bayern Rundfahrt
1st Grand Prix Cholet
2nd Overall Circuit de la Sarthe
2nd Grand Prix Eddy Merckx
4th Grand Prix de Plumelec-Morbihan
5th Route Adélie
6th Overall Tirreno–Adriatico
7th Time trial, UCI Road World Championships
7th Grand Prix de Rennes
7th Giro della Romagna
2001
1st Overall Bayern Rundfahrt

1st Stage 2 (ITT)

1st Overall Tour de Poitou
1st Grand Prix des Nations
1st Duo Normand (with Jonathan Vaughters)
Tour de France

1st Stages 5 (TTT) & 16
Held after Stage 7

1st Stage 7 Critérium du Dauphiné Libéré
2nd Overall Tour de Pologne

1st Points classification
1st Stage 6

2nd Overall Route du Sud

1st Stage 1

3rd Overall Critérium International
3rd Grand Prix de Fourmies
2002
2nd Overall Bayern Rundfahrt
3rd Time trial, National Road Championships
4th Overall Critérium International

1st Points classification
1st Stage 3 (ITT)

4th Overall Deutschland Tour
6th Overall Paris–Nice
2003
1st Overall Tour de Poitou

1st Stage 4 (ITT)

1st Paris–Bourges
2nd Overall Critérium International

1st Stage 3 (ITT)

5th Overall Bayern Rundfahrt
5th Route Adélie
6th Overall Circuit de la Sarthe
6th Tour de Vendée
7th Overall Route du Sud
7th Grand Prix des Nations
8th Gran Premio di Chiasso
10th Tour du Haut Var
2004
1st Overall Critérium International

1st Stages 2 & 3 (ITT)

1st Overall Bayern Rundfahrt
1st LuK Challenge Chrono
Tour of the Basque Country

1st Mountains classification
1st Sprints classification
1st Stage 5

2nd Overall Danmark Rundt

1st Stage 4 (ITT)

2nd Overall Tour de Georgia
2nd Overall Deutschland Tour
2nd Grand Prix Eddy Merckx
3rd Time trial, National Road Championships
3rd Overall Tour Méditerranéen
3rd Klasika Primavera
4th Overall Paris–Nice
6th Grand Prix des Nations
7th Overall Ster Elektrotoer
8th Trofeo Cala
2005
1st Overall Tour Méditerranéen

1st Points classification
1st Stages 1, 3 & 4 (TTT)

1st LuK Challenge Chrono
1st Stage 5a Tour of the Basque Country
1st Stage 4 (ITT) Bayern Rundfahrt
2nd Liège–Bastogne–Liège
3rd Time trial, National Road Championships
4th Overall Paris–Nice

1st Points classification
1st Prologue

4th Overall Étoile de Bessèges

1st Points classification
1st Stage 3

5th Overall Critérium International
Tour de France

Held after Stage 9

2006
1st Overall Deutschland Tour

1st Stages 2, 6 & 7 (ITT)

1st Rund um die Hainleite
1st Giro Bochum
1st Stage 13 Tour de France
National Road Championships

3rd Road race
3rd Time trial

10th Overall Ster Elektrotoer

1st Points classification
1st Stage 4

2007
1st Overall Critérium International

1st Stage 2

1st Overall Deutschland Tour

1st Stage 8

1st Stage 4 Tour of the Basque Country
2nd Overall Tour of California

1st Stage 3

2nd Overall 3-Länder-Tour
3rd Overall Bayern Rundfahrt
6th Overall Vuelta a Murcia
6th Overall Tirreno–Adriatico
2008
1st Overall Tour de Pologne

1st Mountains classification
1st Stage 6

1st Overall Critérium International
1st Stage 18 Giro d'Italia
2009
1st Overall Critérium International

1st Stage 2

3rd Time trial, National Road Championships
4th Overall Tour of California
6th Overall Paris–Nice
7th Overall Tour of Slovenia
2010
1st Stage 4 Volta a Catalunya
3rd Time trial, National Road Championships
4th Overall Vuelta a Andalucía
5th Overall Paris–Nice
6th Overall Tour of California
2012
USA Pro Cycling Challenge

1st Mountains classification
1st Stage 4

2013
1st Stage 5 Tour of California
2014
World Hour record: 51.110 km (31.758 mi)
Tour de France

Combativity award Stage 1
Held after Stage 1

==== Grand Tour general classification results timeline ====
Grand Tour	1998	1999	2000	2001	2002	2003	2004	2005	2006	2007	2008	2009	2010	2011	2012	2013	2014
Giro d'Italia	—	—	—	—	—	—	—	—	37	—	53	48	—	—	—	—	—
Tour de France	83	60	60	46	110	DNF	35	DNF	53	28	37	DNF	126	67	52	67	108
Vuelta a España	Did not contest during his career																

=== World records ===
Discipline	Record	Date	Event	Velodrome	Ref
Hour record	51.110 km (31.758 mi)	18 September 2014	—	Velodrome Suisse	

Records
Preceded by Ondřej Sosenka	UCI hour record (51.110 km (31.758 mi)); 18 September 2014 – 30 October 2014	Succeeded by Matthias Brändle
