= Uwe Peschel =

German cyclist (born 1968)

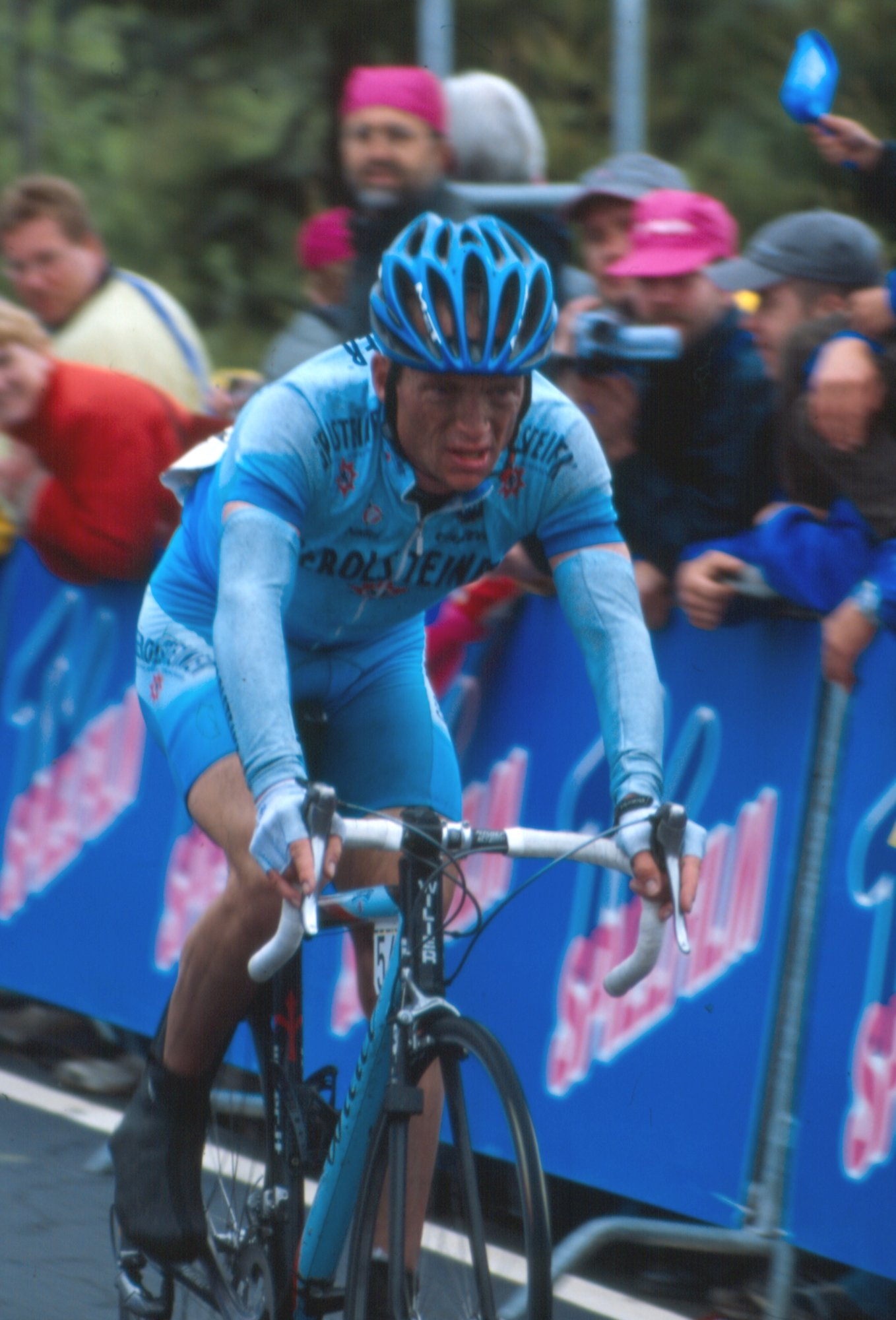
- Peschel at the 2004 Deutschland Tour

Personal information
- Born: 4 November 1968 (age 57) East Berlin, East Germany

Cycling career
- Sport: Cycling
Medal record
Men's road bicycle racing
Representing Germany
Olympic Games
Gold medal – first place	1992 Barcelona	Team Time Trial
World Championships
Silver medal – second place	2003 Hamilton	Time trial

Uwe Peschel (born 4 November 1968) is a German former professional road bicycle racer and a time trialist.

Peschel was born in Berlin in 1968. His father, Axel Peschel, had represented East Germany at the 1968 Olympic men's team time trial a fortnight prior to his birth. At the 1992 Summer Olympics, Peschel Jr along with Bernd Dittert, Christian Meyer and Michael Rich, won the gold medal in the men's team time trial.

== Major achievements ==
1992
Gold Medal, Men's Team Road Race – Summer Olympics
1996
Bayern-Rundfahrt
1997 – Cantina Tollo–Carrier–Starplast
Grand Prix des Nations (ITT)
Stage 3b (ITT) – Danmark Rundt (2.3)
Stage 3 (ITT) – Regio-Tour (2.4)
Stage 4b (ITT) – Grand Prix Tell
1998 – Estepona en Marcha – Brepac
Stage 4b (ITT) – Trofeo Castilla y Leon (2.4)
3rd, Stage 9 (ITT) – Vuelta a España
1999 – Gerolsteiner
2001 – Gerolsteiner
Stage 1 – Peace Race (2.3)
2002 – Gerolsteiner
Grand Prix des Nations (ITT) (1.1)
Germany National Time Trial Cycling Championship
1st overall and Stage 4b (ITT) win – Hessen Rundfahrt (2.3)
Karlsruhe Versicherungs GP (with Michael Rich) (1.2)
9th overall – Deutschland Tour (2.2)
9th overall – Peace Race (2.2)
2003 – Gerolsteiner
GP Eddy Merckx (with Michael Rich)
2nd (Silver Medal) – World Time Trial Cycling Championship
2004 – Gerolsteiner
2005 – Gerolsteiner
3rd – Luk Challenge (1.1) (with Michael Rich)
4th, Prologue (ITT) – Eneco Tour
