= 1997 Chrono des Herbiers =

Race details
- Dates: 19 October 1997
- Stages: 1
- Distance: 48.3 km (30.01 mi)
- Winning time: 1h 00' 10"

Results
	Winner	Serhiy Honchar (UKR)
	Second	Tony Rominger (SUI)
	Third	Francisque Teyssier (FRA)

The 1997 Chrono des Herbiers was the 16th edition of the Chrono des Nations cycle race and was held on 19 October 1997. The race started and finished in Les Herbiers. The race was won by Serhiy Honchar.

== General classification ==
Final general classification

Rank	Rider	Time
1	Serhiy Honchar (UKR)	1h 00' 10"
2	Tony Rominger (SUI)	+ 34"
3	Francisque Teyssier (FRA)	+ 46"
4	Eddy Seigneur (FRA)	+ 1' 27"
5	Jacky Durand (FRA)	+ 1' 37"
6	Cédric Vasseur (FRA)	
7	Bert Roesems (BEL)	
8	Andreas Walzer (GER)	
9	Aitor Garmendia (ESP)	
10	Pascal Lance (FRA)	
