= 2000 Chrono des Herbiers =

Race details
- Dates: 22 October 2000
- Stages: 1
- Distance: 48.15 km (29.92 mi)
- Winning time: 59' 48"

Results
	Winner	Jean Nuttli (SUI)
	Second	Serhiy Honchar (UKR)
	Third	László Bodrogi (FRA)

The 2000 Chrono des Herbiers was the 19th edition of the Chrono des Nations cycle race and was held on 22 October 2000. The race started and finished in Les Herbiers. The race was won by Jean Nuttli.

== General classification ==
Final general classification

Rank	Rider	Time
1	Jean Nuttli (SUI)	59' 48"
2	Serhiy Honchar (UKR)	+ 55"
3	László Bodrogi (FRA)	+ 1' 25"
4	Frédéric Finot (FRA)	s.t.
5	Christophe Moreau (FRA)	+ 1' 33"
6	Erik Saunders (USA)	+ 2' 27"
7	Christophe Thebault (FRA)	+ 3' 26"
8	Francisque Teyssier (FRA)	+ 3' 37"
9	Florent Brard (FRA)	+ 3' 47"
10	Viatcheslav Ekimov (RUS)	+ 3' 55"
