= Jacky Durand =

French cyclist

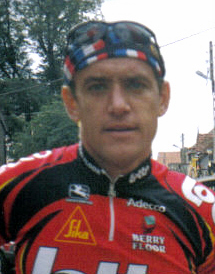
- Durand in 2000

Personal information
- Full name: Jacky Durand
- Nickname: Doudou or Dudu (Teddy Bear)
- Born: 10 February 1967 (age 59) Laval, France

Cycling career
- Sport: Cycling
- Discipline: Road
- Role: Rider
- Rider type: Breakaway specialist Classics specialist

Professional teams
- 1990–1995: Castorama
- 1996: Agrigel–La Creuse–Fenioux
- 1997–1998: Casino
- 1999–2000: Lotto–Mobistar
- 2001–2003: Française des Jeux
- 2004: Landbouwkrediet–Colnago

Major wins
- Grand Tours Tour de France 3 individual stages (1994, 1995, 1998) Combativity award (1998, 1999) One-day races and Classics National Road Race Championships (1993, 1994) Tour of Flanders (1992) Paris–Tours (1998)

Jacky Durand (born 10 February 1967) is a French former professional road bicycle racer. Durand had an attacking style, winning the Tour of Flanders in 1992 after a 217 kilometres (135 mi) breakaway, and three stages in the Tour de France.

Durand turned professional in 1990. He was national road champion in 1993 and 1994 and won Paris–Tours in 1998, the first French winner in 42 years. Durand rode seven Tours de France, finishing last in the 1999 race. In 1995 he was the surprise winner of the prologue, starting before it began raining. He wore the yellow jersey for two days. Durand won the combativity award in the 1998 and 1999 Tour de France; the latter year he also took the Lanterne Rouge. He retired at the end of 2004. He has since worked for Eurosport as a commentator.

== Amateur career ==
Durand was born to a poor farming family in the Mayenne region of northern France. He started racing in the minime class, the very youngest, but never won a race there or in the older cadet category. "It's difficult to win as a kid when you're neither a climber nor a sprinter", he said. "For me, the most beautiful jersey in the world is the French champion's. Yes, when they play the Marseillaise for you after a championship and then you go and show it off for three weeks in the Tour de France, the national flag on your shoulders, it's emotion and pleasure every day." As a senior, however, he won the national amateur team time-trial championship in 1988 with Laurent Bezault, Pascal Lino and Thierry Laurent. He turned professional in 1991.

== Lone breaks ==
Durand became celebrated for long, lone attacks. The French magazine, Vélo, printed a monthly Jackymètre to log the kilometres ridden at the head of races during the course of the season. Durand said: "Fortunately, in cycling, it's not always the best who wins, otherwise we wouldn't win so often."

His riding style was encouraged by his first directeur sportif, Cyrille Guimard. It brought him a seemingly suicidal win in the Tour of Flanders. Guimard told him to attack early in the national championship at Châtellerault in 1993, to try his chance and to spoil those of Laurent Brochard and Luc Leblanc. Writer Jean-François Quénet said Guimard told Durand to attack far from the finish "because he didn't want to see Laurent Brochard in blue, white and red and even less did he want a second consecutive title for Luc Leblanc, who was in disgrace in the Castorama team.".

Of the way he rode, Durand said:

I'm not a revolutionary of any sort, but on the bike, I've always refused to come out of a mould. It astonishes me that most riders are followers, even sheep. A lot of them, the only people who know they're in the Tour are their directeurs sportifs. I couldn't do the job like that. They finish the Tour without having attacked once, maybe the whole of the season, even the whole of their career. I'd rather finish shattered and last having attacked a hundred times than finish 25th without having tried. Yes, I get ragged about it, but it's always in a friendly way. In the bunch, the guys know that Dudu is as likely to finish a long way behind them as first.

== Tour of Flanders ==
Durand won the Ronde van Vlaanderen, or Tour of Flanders, in 1992, 36 years after the last French winner, Jean Forestier, in 1956. He broke away from the field with Thomas Wegmüller after a quarter of the race, with 217 km still to ride. His success as an outsider, and after such a long lone ride, stayed in the memory of Belgian fans. Years later, Durand was stopped for speeding. The Belgian policeman who came to his car said, "Vous avez gagné le Tour des Flandres en nonante-deux" ("You won the Tour of Flanders in '92") – and let him drive on.

Durand finished his career with Belgian teams. "Winning the Ronde made me a bit of a naturalised Belgian", he said.

== Doping and disqualification ==
Durand took drugs during the Tour de la Côte Picarde in 1996 and was given a one-month probationary suspension. He was disqualified during the Tour de France in 2002 for holding on to a car during the mountainous stage to the Plateau de Beille in the Pyrenees. There had been complaints from riders, including the Czech, Ján Svorada, that he had done the same the previous year.

His name was on the list of doping tests published by the French Senate on 24 July 2013 that were collected during the 1998 Tour de France and found positive for EPO when retested in 2004.

== Retirement ==
Durand retired from racing in 2005 after receiving no team offers. He followed that year's Tour de France as representative of the supermarket chain Champion. He is now a television commentator for Eurosport.

== Private life ==
Durand stayed loyal to his first club, CC Renazé (53), throughout his career. He lives in Mauritius.

On 25 November 2017, Durand's 80-year-old father, Henri Durand, was reported missing by his wife, Colette, after he went out for his usual bicycle ride and never returned. His body was found in a lake on 2 January 2018, in between Ballots and Saint-Michel-de-la-Roë. An autopsy confirmed he had died from drowning.

== Major results ==
1988
1st Stage 4a (ITT) Circuit Franco-Belge
1990
4th Chrono des Herbiers
1991
1st Grand Prix d'Isbergues
1992
1st Tour of Flanders
1993
1st Road race, National Road Championships
1st Points classification Critérium du Dauphiné Libéré
1994
1st Road race, National Road Championships
1st Stage 10 Tour de France
Tour du Limousin

1st Stages 2 & 4

3rd Polynormande
7th Overall Tour de l'Oise
1995
Tour de France

1st Prologue
Held after Prologue & Stage 1
Held after Prologue

1st Stage 4 Grand Prix du Midi Libre
3rd Overall Tour de l'Oise
8th Cholet-Pays de Loire
1996
2nd Overall Tour du Poitou Charentes
2nd Overall Tour de Normandie
2nd GP de la Ville de Rennes
3rd Tour de Vendée
9th Overall Route du Sud
1997
2nd A Travers le Morbihan
5th Paris–Bourges
5th Chrono des Herbiers
1998
1st Paris–Tours
Tour de France

1st Stage 8
Combativity award

1st Stage 2 Tour de Luxembourg
2nd Overall Tour de Pologne

1st Stage 7

2nd Châteauroux Classic
3rd Overall Tour du Limousin
4th Chrono des Herbiers
4th Grand Prix des Nations
7th Grand Prix Eddy Merckx (with Marc Streel)
1999
1st Stage 5 Paris–Nice
3rd Châteauroux Classic
Vuelta a España

Held after Stages 1–2

Tour de France

Combativity award

2000
National Road Championships

2nd Road race
7th Time trial

5th Overall Bayern Rundfahrt
2001
1st Tro-Bro Léon
2nd Overall Circuit Franco-Belge
7th GP de Fourmies
10th Chrono des Herbiers
10th Grand Prix Eddy Merckx (with Bradley McGee)
2002
1st Stage 1 Critérium du Dauphiné Libéré
2nd Overall Tour de Picardie
2nd Paris–Tours
5th Tartu Tänavasóit
5th GP Rudy Dhaenens
7th E.O.S. Tallinn GP
2003
3rd Châteauroux Classic
8th Tartu Tänavasóit
8th E.O.S. Tallinn GP
