= 2001 Chrono des Herbiers =

Race details
- Dates: 21 October 2001
- Stages: 1
- Distance: 48.35 km (30.04 mi)
- Winning time: 59' 45"

Results
	Winner	Jean Nuttli (SUI)
	Second	László Bodrogi (FRA)
	Third	Serhiy Honchar (UKR)

The 2001 Chrono des Herbiers was the 20th edition of the Chrono des Nations cycle race and was held on 21 October 2001. The race started and finished in Les Herbiers. The race was won by Jean Nuttli.

== General classification ==
Final general classification

Rank	Rider	Time
1	Jean Nuttli (SUI)	59' 45"
2	László Bodrogi (FRA)	+ 26"
3	Serhiy Honchar (UKR)	+ 50"
4	Bert Roesems (BEL)	+ 1' 22"
5	Florent Brard (FRA)	+ 1' 28"
6	Michael Rogers (AUS)	+ 1' 41"
7	Nico Mattan (BEL)	+ 1' 49"
8	Bart Voskamp (NED)	+ 2' 02"
9	Evgeni Petrov (RUS)	+ 2' 29"
10	Jacky Durand (FRA)	+ 2' 42"
