= 1996 Chrono des Herbiers =

Race details
- Dates: 20 October 1996
- Stages: 1
- Distance: 48.3 km (30.01 mi)
- Winning time: 58' 56"

Results
	Winner	Chris Boardman (GBR)
	Second	Laurent Brochard (FRA)
	Third	Neil Stephens (AUS)

The 1996 Chrono des Herbiers was the 15th edition of the Chrono des Nations cycle race and was held on 20 October 1996. The race started and finished in Les Herbiers. The race was won by Chris Boardman.

== General classification ==
Final general classification

Rank	Rider	Time
1	Chris Boardman (GBR)	58' 56"
2	Laurent Brochard (FRA)	+ 2' 56"
3	Neil Stephens (AUS)	+ 3' 14"
4	Nicolas Aubier (FRA)	+ 3' 18"
5	Emmanuel Hubert (FRA)	+ 3' 23"
6	Destang (FRA)	+ 3' 36"
7	Iñigo González de Heredia (ESP)	+ 3' 55"
8	Jens Lehmann (GER)	+ 4' 04"
9	Claudio Chiappucci (ITA)	+ 4' 06"
10	Pascal Lance (FRA)	+ 4' 14"
