= 1998 Chrono des Herbiers =

Race details
- Dates: 18 October 1998
- Stages: 1
- Distance: 48.3 km (30.01 mi)
- Winning time: 59' 20"

Results
	Winner	Serhiy Honchar (UKR)
	Second	Gilles Maignan (FRA)
	Third	Francisque Teyssier (FRA)

The 1998 Chrono des Herbiers was the 17th edition of the Chrono des Nations cycle race and was held on 18 October 1998. The race started and finished in Les Herbiers. The race was won by Serhiy Honchar.

== General classification ==
Final general classification

Rank	Rider	Time
1	Serhiy Honchar (UKR)	59' 20"
2	Gilles Maignan (FRA)	+ 1' 14"
3	Francisque Teyssier (FRA)	+ 1' 26"
4	Jacky Durand (FRA)	+ 1' 39"
5	Michele Bartoli (ITA)	+ 2' 03"
6	Grzegorz Gwiazdowski (POL)	
7	Youri Sourkov (KAZ)	
8	Chris Boardman (GBR)	
9	Bradley McGee (AUS)	
10	Andreas Walzer (GER)	
