= 1999 Chrono des Herbiers =

Race details
- Dates: October 17, 1999
- Stages: 1
- Distance: 48.15 km (29.92 mi)
- Winning time: 1h 00' 23"

Results
	Winner	Serhiy Honchar (UKR)
	Second	Gilles Maignan (FRA)
	Third	Christophe Moreau (FRA)

The 1999 Chrono des Herbiers was the 18th edition of the Chrono des Nations cycle race and was held on 17 October 1999. The race started and finished in Les Herbiers. The race was won by Serhiy Honchar.

== General classification ==
Final general classification

Rank	Rider	Time
1	Serhiy Honchar (UKR)	1h 00' 23"
2	Gilles Maignan (FRA)	+ 31"
3	Christophe Moreau (FRA)	+ 56"
4	László Bodrogi (FRA)	+ 1' 21"
5	Bert Roesems (BEL)	+ 1' 24"
6	Chris Boardman (GBR)	+ 1' 39"
7	José Alberto Martínez (ESP)	+ 3' 27"
8	Florent Brard (FRA)	+ 3' 33"
9	Stéphane Bergès (FRA)	+ 3' 34"
10	Youri Sourkov (KAZ)	+ 3' 45"
