= 2019 Chrono des Nations =

Race details
- Dates: 20 October 2019
- Stages: 1
- Distance: 46.3 km (28.77 mi)
- Winning time: 55' 02"

Results
	Winner	Jos van Emden (NED)
	Second	Filippo Ganna (ITA)
	Third	Primož Roglič (SLO)

The 2019 Chrono des Nations was the 38th edition of the Chrono des Nations cycle race, organised as a 1.1 race on the UCI Europe Tour, was held on 20 October 2019. The race started and finished in Les Herbiers. The race was won by Jos van Emden.

== Result ==
Result
Rank	Rider	Team	Time
1	Jos van Emden (NED)	Team Jumbo–Visma	55' 02"
2	Filippo Ganna (ITA)	Team Ineos	+ 11"
3	Primož Roglič (SLO)	Team Jumbo–Visma	+ 19"
4	Rasmus Quaade (DEN)	Riwal Readynez	+ 41"
5	Mikkel Bjerg (DEN)	Hagens Berman Axeon	+ 57"
6	Michael Valgren (DEN)	Team Dimension Data	+ 1' 18"
7	Martin Toft Madsen (DEN)	BHS–Almeborg Bornholm	+ 1' 18"
8	Jan Tratnik (SLO)	Bahrain–Merida	+ 1' 28"
9	Justin Wolf (GER)	Bike Aid	+ 1' 31"
10	Niki Terpstra (NED)	Total Direct Énergie	+ 2' 12"

2019 Chrono des Nations U23
Race details
- Dates: 20 October 2019
- Stages: 1
- Distance: 33.6 km (20.88 mi)
- Winning time: 41' 32"

Results
	Winner	Jasper De Plus (BEL)
	Second	Mathias Norsgaard (DEN)
	Third	Clément Davy (FRA)

== Result (Men U23) ==
Result
Rank	Rider	Team	Time
1	Jasper De Plus (BEL)	/	41' 32"
2	Mathias Norsgaard (DEN)	/	+ 31"
3	Clément Davy (FRA)	/	+ 47"
4	Michael O' Loughlin (IRL)	/	+ 1' 14"
5	Ognjen Ilic (SRB)	/	+ 1' 42"
6	Simon Verger (FRA)	/	+ 2' 06"
7	Julien Souton (FRA)	/	+ 2' 06"
8	Thibault Guernalec (FRA)	/	+ 2' 07"
9	Harrison Wood (GBR)	/	+ 2' 13"
10	Louis Lóuvet (FRA)	/	+ 2' 20"
