= Crédit Agricole (cycling team) =

Former French professional cycling team

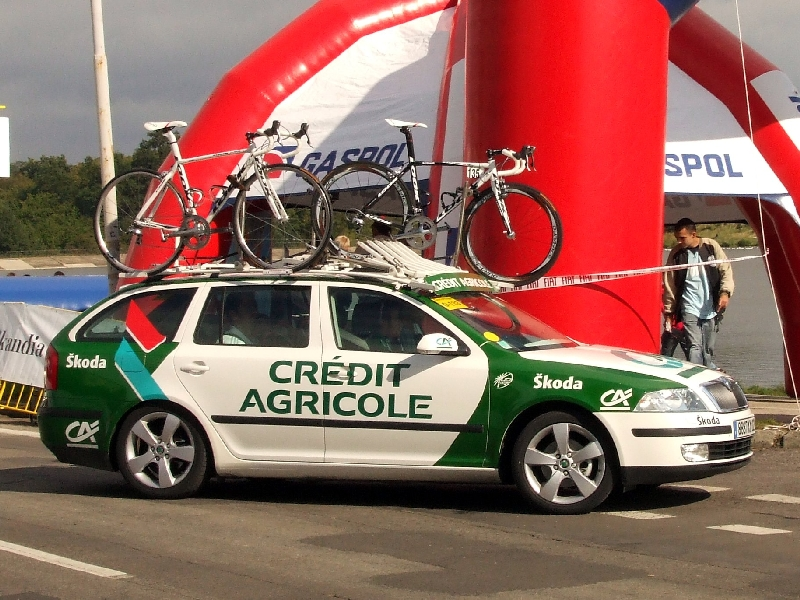

Team information
- UCI code: C.A
- Registered: France
- Founded: 1987
- Disbanded: 2008
- Discipline: Road
- Status: ProTour

Key personnel
- General manager: Roger Legeay

Team name history
- 1987 1988–1989 1990 1991–1992 1993–1998 1998–2008: Vêtements Z–Peugeot; Z–Peugeot; Z-Tommaso; Z GAN; Crédit Agricole
Crédit Agricole jersey
Jersey

Crédit Agricole (UCI team code: C.A) was a French professional cycling team sponsored by the French bank Crédit Agricole from 1998 to 2008. Prior to 1997, the team was known as Vêtements Z–Peugeot (1987), Z–Peugeot (1988–89), Z (1990–92) and GAN (1993–98). In 1990, the team's leading cyclist, the American Greg LeMond, won the Tour de France. The team also won the team title at the Tour de France that year. Crédit Agricole announced that they would cease to sponsor the team after 2008, and the team was subsequently disbanded.

== History ==
The team was born out of the Peugeot cycling team, which existed from the early 1900s to 1986. Roger Legeay was the Peugeot team's last manager, and he created Vêtements Z–Peugeot in 1987 (taking its name from the children's clothing brand Z and the car manufacturer Peugeot). That year, the team made its appearance at the Tour de France, with Frenchman Pascal Simon as its leading cyclist.

In 1988, under the name of Z–Peugeot, the team achieved its first stage win at the Tour de France when Jérôme Simon (Pascal Simon's brother) won stage 9 of the tour. The team's second stage win came in 1989, when the Scottish rider Robert Millar took a mountain stage.

In 1990, the Tour's defending champion, Greg LeMond, moved to the team, which had been renamed Z. Riding for the team, LeMond won his third Tour title that year, coming in 2 minutes and 16 seconds ahead of the second-placed rider, the Italian Claudio Chiappucci. LeMond credited strong team support and tactics for his third Tour victory. And the team also won the team title at the year's Tour, coming in just 16 seconds ahead of the ONCE cycling team (the closest margin for the team classification in the Tour's history).

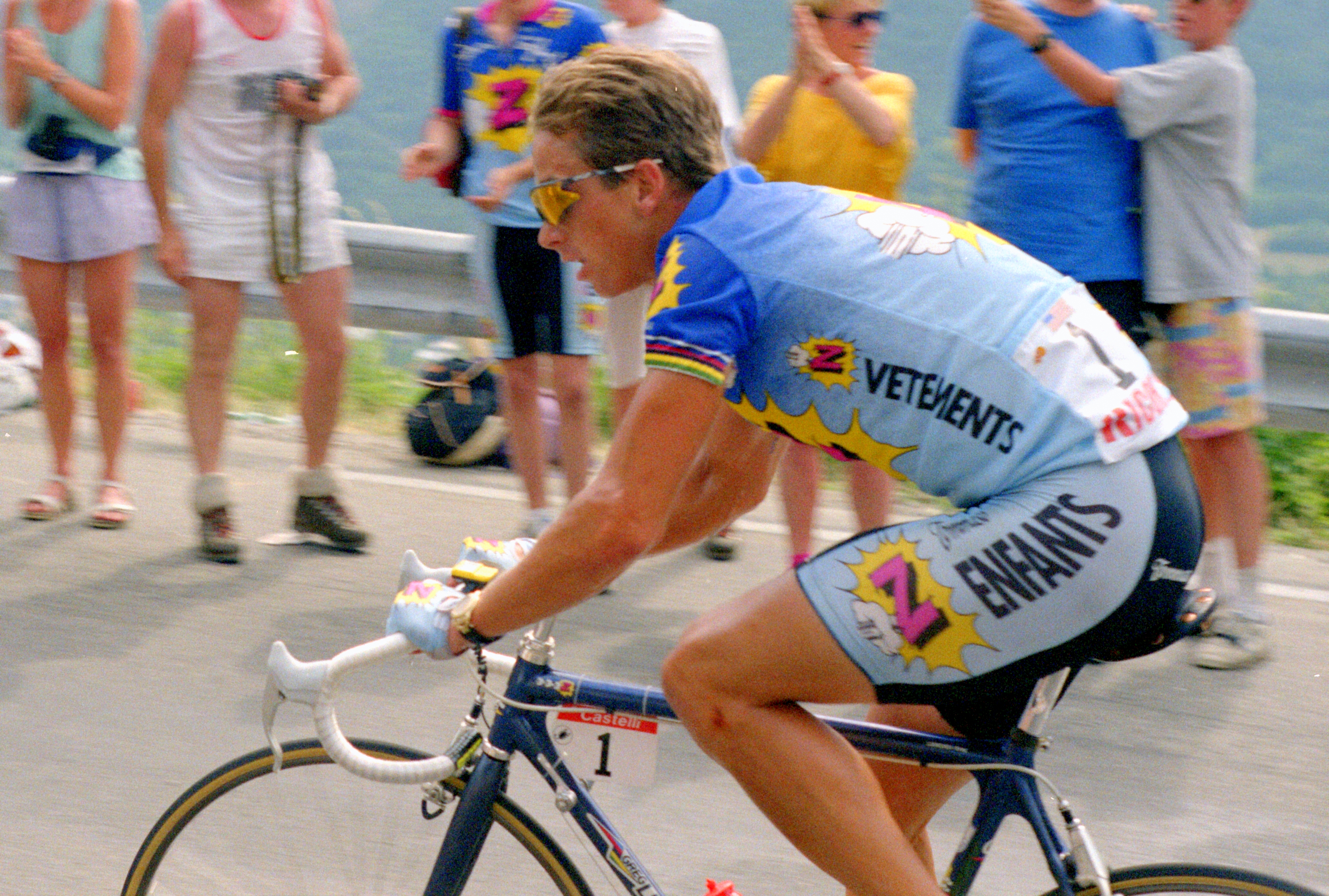
Greg LeMond at the 1991 Tour de France

In 1991, with the team renamed simply Z, LeMond wore the yellow jersey for five stages in the earlier part of the Tour, but faded as the event progressed and eventually finished in seventh place, 13 minutes behind the new champion, the Spanish rider Miguel Induráin.

In 1992, LeMond struggled and eventually abandoned the Tour on the 14th stage. However the team picked up one stage win that year, with Jean-Claude Colotti winning stage 17.

In 1993, the team was renamed GAN. LeMond did not ride in the 1993 Tour. He returned in 1994, but withdrew after six stages.

Just prior to LeMond's departure the team acquired the British track cyclist Chris Boardman, a time trial specialist. Riding for the team, Boardman won the Prologue of the Tour de France in 1994, 1997 and 1998.

The team also acquired a young Australian track rider, Stuart O'Grady, in the mid-1990s. He won several Tour stages and nearly won the points classification in the 2000 Tour de France. O'Grady held on to the yellow jersey as leader of the general classification for many days during that same tour.

The team was renamed Crédit Agricole in 1998.

German rider Jens Voigt joined the team until the 2003 season, winning a Tour stage and spending a day in the yellow jersey in 2001.

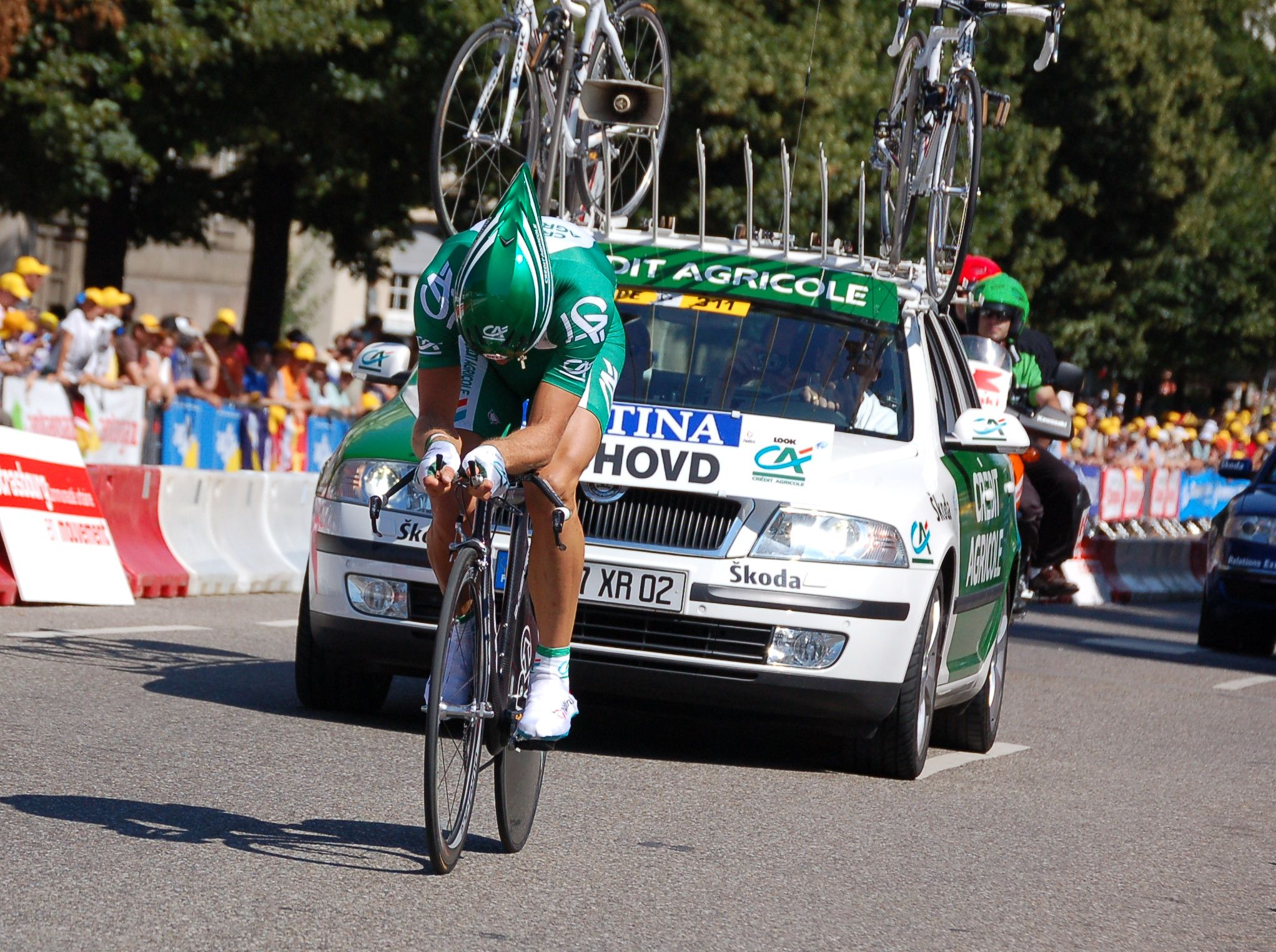
Thor Hushovd riding in front of the Crédit Agricole team car, when winning the prologue in the 2006 Tour de France

The 2000 and 2001 seasons saw Americans Bobby Julich and Jonathan Vaughters in the team, making it the team with the most English speakers. The team also won the 2001 Tour de France team time trial in front of the ONCE and U.S. Postal teams. Julich and Vaughters left after one and two seasons respectively.

The 2003 season saw the emergence of Thor Hushovd of Norway as the main sprinter of the team. At the end of 2003 O'Grady and Voigt left for Cofidis and Team CSC respectively.

2005 was successful for the team. Pietro Caucchioli finished in the top ten of the Giro d'Italia and Christophe Le Mével took a breakaway stage win. In the 2005 Tour de France Christophe Moreau was the highest-placed French rider (11th) and Thor Hushovd secured the green jersey points classification.

In 2006, Crédit Agricole captured the team classification at the Tour de Pologne. Hushovd took stage wins and two days in the yellow jersey at the Tour de France, won the Gent–Wevelgem classic, and a stage win and the points classification at the Vuelta a España.

From 2005 to 2008, the team was one of the 20 which competed in the UCI ProTour.

The team disbanded at the end of the 2008 season when Crédit Agricole ended their sponsorship.

== Major wins ==
1988
Overall Route du Sud, Ronan Pensec
GP de la Ville de Rennes, Ronan Pensec
Stage 9 Tour de France, Jérôme Simon
1989
Grand Prix du Midi Libre, Jérôme Simon
Overall Route du Sud, Gilbert Duclos-Lassalle
Stage 4 Paris–Nice, Bruno Cornillet
Stage 4 Tour de Romandie, Robert Millar
Stage 6b Critérium du Dauphiné, Robert Millar
Stage 10 Tour de France, Robert Millar
1990
Cholet – Pays de Loire, Kim Andersen
Tour de Vendée, François Lemarchand
Stage 4 Tour de Romandie, Robert Millar
Stages 11 & 14 Giro d'Italia, Éric Boyer
Overall Critérium du Dauphiné, Robert Millar
Stage 11 Tour de Suisse, Kim Andersen
Overall Tour de France, Greg LeMond
1991
A Travers le Morbihan, Bruno Cornillet
Route Adélie, Jérôme Simon
Grand Prix du Midi Libre, Gilbert Duclos-Lassalle
Circuit Cycliste Sarthe
Overall, Bruno Cornillet
Overall Tour du Poitou Charentes, Kim Andersen
GP de la Ville de Rennes, Kim Andersen
Trophée des Grimpeurs, Atle Kvålsvoll
Giro d'Italia

Stage 1, Philippe Casado
Stage 4, Éric Boyer

Grand Prix de Plumelec-Morbihan, Bruno Cornillet
Stage 5 Tour de Suisse, Robert Millar
1992
Overall Tour du Poitou Charentes et de la Vienne, Pascal Lance
Overall Tour du Limousin, Éric Boyer
Paris–Roubaix, Gilbert Duclos-Lassalle
Overall Tour de Vendée, Bruno Cornillet
Stage 8 Tour de Suisse, Éric Boyer
Stage 17 Tour de France, Jean-Claude Colotti
1993
GP d'Ouverture La Marseillaise, Didier Rous
Overall Route du Sud, Éric Boyer
Overall Tour du Haut Var, Thierry Claveyrolat
GP de la Ville de Rennes, Eddy Seigneur
Paris–Roubaix, Gilbert Duclos-Lassalle
Trophée des Grimpeurs, Thierry Claveyrolat
Stage 2 Critérium du Dauphiné, Gilbert Duclos-Lassalle
GP Ouest France-Plouay, Thierry Claveyrolat
Paris-Bruxelles, Francis Moreau
1994
Prologue & Stages 3 & 7 Critérium du Dauphiné, Chris Boardman
Stage 6 Tour de Suisse, Chris Boardman
Prologue Tour de France, Chris Boardman
Stage 21, Eddy Seigneur
Chrono des Nations, Pascal Lance
Overall 4 Days of Dunkirk, Eddy Seigneur
World Time Trial Championships, Chris Boardman
1995
Stage 2 Vuelta Ciclista al Pais Vasco, Gilbert Duclos-Lassalle
Prologue Critérium du Dauphiné, Chris Boardman
Chrono des Nations, Pascal Lance
A Travers le Morbihan, Francis Moreau
Overall Tour du Poitou Charentes et de la Vienne, Nicolas Aubier
Grand Prix de Plumelec-Morbihan, Francis Moreau
1996
Stage 4 Volta a la Comunidad Valenciana, Didier Rous
Overall Critérium International, Chris Boardman
Chrono des Nations, Chris Boardman
Overall Tour de Picardie, Philippe Gaumont
GP Eddy Merckx, Chris Boardman
La Côte Picarde, Philippe Gaumont
Overall 4 Days of Dunkirk, Philippe Gaumont
Overall Tour du Poitou Charentes et de la Vienne, Eddy Seigneur
Paris–Nice

Stage 1, Frédéric Moncassin
Stage 8b, Chris Boardman

Cholet – Pays de Loire, Stéphane Heulot
Overall Tour de Vendée, Laurent Desbiens
Trophée des Grimpeurs, Stéphane Heulot
Critérium du Dauphiné,

Prologue, Chris Boardman
Stage 2, François Simon
Stages 1 & 19 Tour de France, Frédéric Moncassin

Grand Prix des Nations, Chris Boardman
1997
Stage 5b Volta a la Comunidad Valenciana, Chris Boardman
Prologue & Stage 6 Tour de Romandie, Chris Boardman
Prologue Critérium du Dauphiné, Chris Boardman
Stages 1b & 5 Volta Ciclista a Catalunya, Chris Boardman
Tour de France

Prologue, Chris Boardman
Stage 5, Cédric Vasseur

Stage 7 Vuelta a España, Yvon Ledanois
1998
Stage 5a Tour of the Basque Country, Jens Voigt
Prologue & Stage 4 Critérium du Dauphiné, Chris Boardman
Stages 1b & 5 Volta Ciclista a Catalunya, Chris Boardman
Tour de France

Prologue, Chris Boardman
Stage 14, Stuart O'Grady
Stage 19, Magnus Bäckstedt

1999
Critérium International

Overall, Jens Voigt
Stage 3, Chris Boardman

Overall Tour Down Under, Stuart O'Grady

Stages 3 & 5, Stuart O'Grady

Stage 1 Paris–Nice, Chris Boardman
Classic Haribo, Stuart O'Grady
Joseph Vögeli Memorial, Chris Boardman
Breitling GP, Jens Voigt and Chris Boardman
Duo Normand, Jens Voigt and Chris Boardman
Tour du Loir-et-Cher, Thor Hushovd
Overall Tour of Norway, Thor Hushovd
Annemasse-Bellegarde et retour, Thor Hushovd
Stage 5 Tour of Sweden, Thor Hushovd
2000
Overall Bayern Rundfahrt, Jens Voigt
Cholet-Pays de Loire, Jens Voigt
Tour du Finistère
Overall, Sébastien Hinault
Melbourne to Sorrento, Stuart O'Grady
Stage 2 Critérium du Dauphiné, Fabrice Gougot
2001
Tour de France

Stage 5 TTT
Stage 16, Jens Voigt

Overall Tour Down Under, Stuart O'Grady
Grand Prix des Nations, Jens Voigt
Paris–Corrèze, Thor Hushovd
Overall Bayern Rundfahrt, Jens Voigt

Stage 2, Jens Voigt

Overall Tour of Sweden, Thor Hushovd

Stages 1a & 3, Thor Hushovd

Tour du Poitou-Charentes, Jens Voigt
Tour de Normandie, Thor Hushovd
Tour of Wellington, Christopher Jenner
Duo Normand, Jens Voigt and Jonathan Vaughters
Stage 4 Critérium du Dauphiné, Jonathan Vaughters
Stage 6 Tour de Pologne, Jens Voigt
Profronde van Oostvoorne, Stuart O'Grady
Gouden Pijl Emmen, Stuart O'Grady
Ronde de l´Isard d´Ariège, Christophe Le Mével
2002
Stage 18 Tour de France, Thor Hushovd
Stage 3 Critérium International, Jens Voigt
Stage 4 Four Days of Dunkirk, Christophe Moreau
Stage 2 Tour de l'Ain, Thor Hushovd
Boucles de l´Aulne – GP Le Télégramme, Christopher Jenner
2003
Stages 6 & 8 Tour de Langkawi, Stuart O'Grady
Le Tour de Bretagne Cycliste – Trophée des Granitiers, Dmitriy Muravyev
Overall 4 Days of Dunkirk, Christophe Moreau

Stages 4 & 5, Christophe Moreau

Tour du Poitou Charentes et de la Vienne
Overall, Jens Voigt
Stage 4, Jens Voigt
GP Jef Scherens Leuven, Thor Hushovd
Paris–Bourges, Jens Voigt
Stage 4 Tour de Pologne, Sébastien Hinault
2004
Sachsen-Tour International, Andrey Kashechkin
Flèche Ardennaise, Jeremy Yates
Stage 3 Étoile de Bessèges, Thor Hushovd
Classic Haribo, Thor Hushovd
GP de Denain Porte du Hainaut, Thor Hushovd
Tour de Vendée, Thor Hushovd
Trophée des Grimpeurs – Polymultipliée, Christophe Moreau
Stage 4 Deutschland Tour, Sébastien Hinault
Stage 1 Critérium du Dauphiné, Thor Hushovd
Stage 8 Tour de France, Thor Hushovd
Overall Tour du Limousin, Pierrick Fedrigo

Stage 2, Pierrick Fedrigo

GP de Fourmies / La Voix du Nord, Andrey Kashechkin
2005
Stage 3 Circuit Cycliste Sarthe – Pays de la Loire, Damien Nazon
La Côte Picarde, Jean Marc Marino
Stage 2 Circuit de Lorraine Professionnels, Bradley Wiggins
Stage 1 4 Days of Dunkirk, Thor Hushovd
Stage 4 Tour de Picardie, Damien Nazon
Stage 7 Volta Ciclista a Catalunya, Damien Nazon
Stage 16 Giro d'Italia, Christophe Le Mével
Overall Tour de Luxembourg, László Bodrogi
Stage 1 Critérium du Dauphiné, Thor Hushovd
Route du Sud

Stage 1, Nicolas Vogondy
Stage 4, Patrice Halgand

Points classification Tour de France, Thor Hushovd
Overall Tour du Limousin, Sébastien Joly

Stage 1, Sébastien Joly
Stage 4, Thor Hushovld

Stage 3 Tour du Poitou Charentes et de la Vienne, Jaan Kirsipuu
Stage 5 Vuelta a España, Thor Hushovd
Stage 8 Tour de l´Avenir, Bradley Wiggins
Stage 3 Tour de Pologne, Jaan Kirsipuu
Stage 2 Circuit Franco-Belge, Sébastien Hinault
2006
Stage 5 Jayco Bay Cycling Classic, Mark Renshaw
Stages 2 & 5 Étoile de Bessèges, Jaan Kirsipuu
Tour de Langkawi

Stage 3, Saul Raisin
Stage 8, Sébastien Hinault

Stage 4 Tirreno – Adriatico, Thor Hushovd
Gent–Wevelgem, Thor Hushovd
Tro-Bro Léon, Mark Renshaw
Stage 4 Tour de Picardie, Sébastien Hinault
Stage 7 Critérium du Dauphiné, Thor Hushovd
Stage 4 Route du Sud, Patrice Halgand
Prologue & Stage 20 Tour de France, Thor Hushovd
Stage 6 Tour of Austria, László Bodrogi
Stage 4 Tour de l´Ain, Patrice Halgand
Prix d Armorique, Pierre Rolland
Tour du Limousin
Stage 4, Sébastien Hinault
Châteauroux Classic de l´Indre Trophée Fenioux, Nicolas Vogondy
Stage 5 Tour du Poitou Charentes et de la Vienne, Nicolas Vogondy
Vuelta a España

Points classification, Thor Hushovd
Stage 6 Thor Hushovd

Volta a Catalunya

Points Classification, Thor Hushovd
Stage 3 Thor Hushovd

2007
Overall Jayco Bay Cycling Classic, Mark Renshaw

Prologue, Mark Renshaw

Down Under Classic, Mark Renshaw
La Tropicale Amissa Bongo Ondimba

Prologue, Jimmy Engoulvent
Stage 1, Pierre Roland
Stage 3, Sébastien Hinault

Overall Tour de Langkawi, Anthony Charteau
Stage 3, Anthony Charteau
Stage 1 Étoile de Bessèges, Angelo Furlan
Route Adélie, Rémi Pauriol
Stage 1 Circuit Cycliste Sarthe, Angelo Furlan
Stage 2 Tour de Picardie, Mark Renshaw
Stage 4 Ronde de l´Isard d´Ariège, Ignatas Konovalovas
Prologue Tour de Luxembourg, Jimmy Engoulvent
Tour de France

Stage 4, Thor Hushovd

Stage 4 Tour de la Wallonne, Rémi Pauriol
Stage 4 Tour de l´Ain, Patrice Halgand
Stage 2 Tour du Limousin, Pierre Roland
Chrono des Nations, László Bodrogi
2008
Overall Jayco Bay Cycling Classic, Mark Renshaw

Stage 3, Mark Renshaw

Stage 1 Tour Down Under, Mark Renshaw
Stage 4 Étoile de Bessèges, Angelo Furlan
Stage 2 Tour de Langkawi, Jeremy Hunt
Overall Tour Méditerranéen, Alexander Bocharov

Stage 1, Thor Hushovd
Stage 3, Alexander Bocharov

Prologue Paris–Nice, Thor Hushovd
Stage 4 Tour ivoirien de la Paix, Jimmy Engoulvent
Stage 2 Volta ao Distrito de Santarém, Angelo Furlan
Stage 2 Critérium International, Simon Gerrans
Stage 6 4 Days of Dunkirk, Thor Hushovd
Volta a Catalunya

Points Classification, Thor Hushovd
Prologue, Thor Hushovd
Stage 1, Thor Hushovd

Stage 1 Circuit de Lorraine Professionnels, Jonathan Hivert
Stage 2 Tour de Luxembourg, Ignatas Konovalovas
Stage 7 Critérium du Dauphiné, Dmitriy Fofonov
Stage 1 Route du Sud, Simon Gerrans
Tour de France

Stage 2, Thor Hushovd
Stage 15, Simon Gerrans

Stage 5 Tour de la Wallonne, Patrice Halgand
Overall Tour du Limousin, Sébastien Hinault

Stage 1, Nicolas Roche
Stage 3, Sébastien Hinault

Stage 10 Vuelta a España, Sébastien Hinault
Stage 3 Tour de Pologne, Angelo Furlan
Grand Prix de la Somme, William Bonnet
GP d´Isbergues, William Bonnet
Stage 2 Circuit Franco-Belge, Mark Renshaw

== National champions ==
1994
World Time Trial Championships, Chris Boardman
1995
French Road Race Championships, Eddy Seigneur
1996
French Road Race Championships, Stéphane Heulot
French Time Trial Championships, Eddy Seigneur
1997
French Time Trial Championships, Francisque Teyssier
1999
Australian Road Race Championships, Henk Vogels
French Road Race Championships, François Simon
2002
Norwegian Time Trial Championships, Thor Hushovd
2003
Australian Road Race Championships, Stuart O'Grady
2004
Norwegian Road Race Championships, Thor Hushovd
Norwegian Time Trial Championships, Thor Hushovd
2005
Norwegian Time Trial Championships, Thor Hushovd
Kazakhstan Time Trial Championships, Dimitry Muravyev
Estonia Road Race Championships, Jaan Kirsipuu
Estonia Time Trial Championships, Jaan Kirsipuu
2006
Estonia Time Trial Championships, Jaan Kirsipuu
Hungary Time Trial Championships, László Bodrogi
2007
New Zealand Road Race Championships, Julian Dean
Hungary Time Trial Championships, László Bodrogi
Ireland Time Trial Championships, Nicolas Roche
2008
Lithuania Time Trial Championships, Ignatas Konovalovas
