= Nicolas Rousseau =

French cyclist

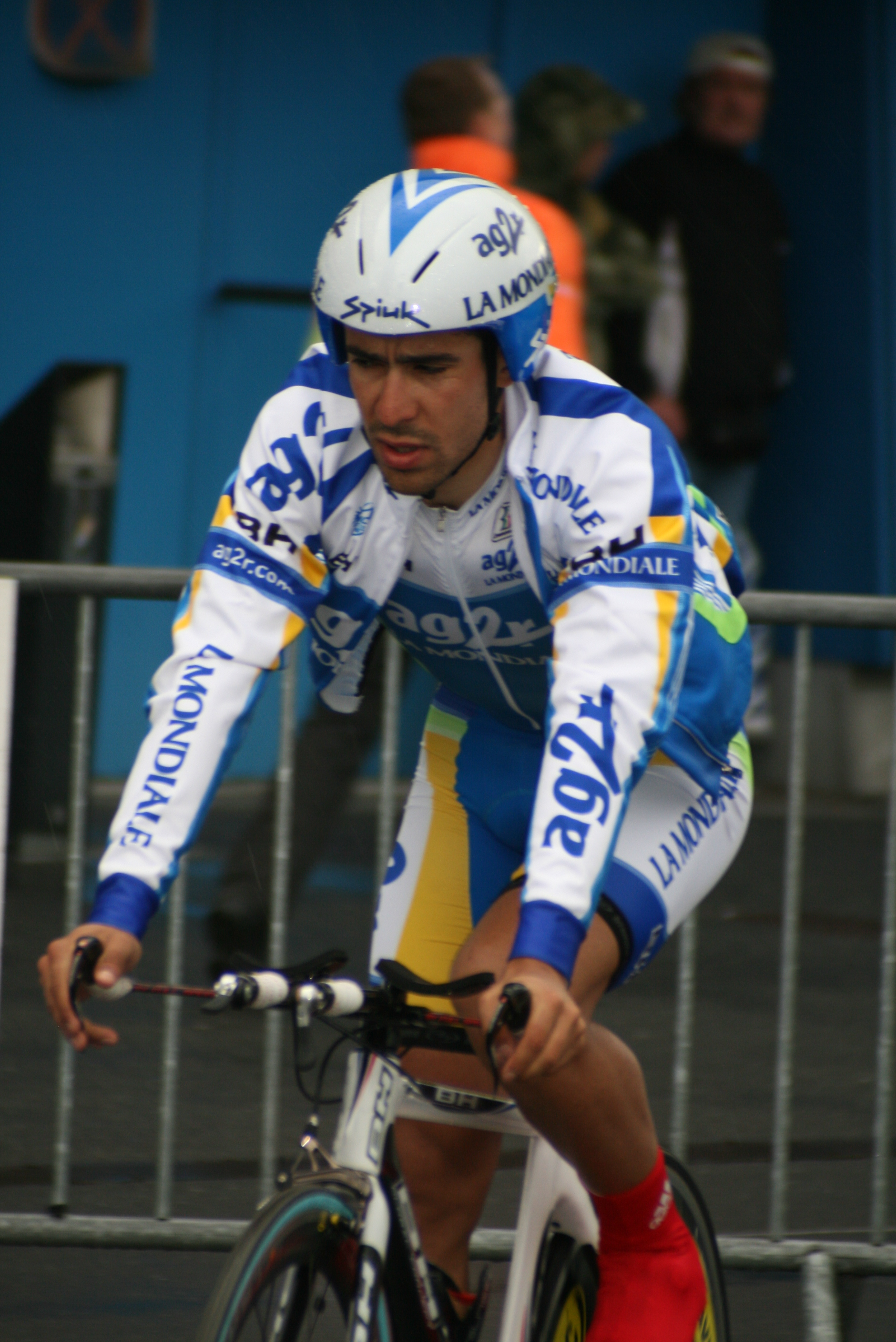

Personal information
- Full name: Nicolas Rousseau
- Born: 16 March 1983 (age 43) Château-Renault, France
- Height: 1.76 m (5 ft 9 in)
- Weight: 70 kg (150 lb)

Cycling career
- Sport: Cycling
- Current team: St. Michel–Preference Home–Auber93
- Discipline: Road
- Role: Rider

Amateur teams
- 2005: CAC 41 Blois
- 2006: AG2R Prévoyance (stagiaire)

Professional teams
- 2007–2010: AG2R Prévoyance
- 2011–2012: BigMat–Auber 93

Nicolas Rousseau (born 16 March 1983) is a French professional road bicycle racer for St. Michel–Preference Home–Auber93. He won stage 3 of the 2010 La Tropicale Amissa Bongo.

== Achievements ==
2000
1st Chrono des Nations Juniors
2001
1st Chrono des Nations Juniors
2005
5th Boucle de l'Artois
2006
3rd Overall Boucles de la Mayenne
4th Overall Tour de Gironde
5th La Roue Tourangelle
10th Overall Tour du Poitou Charentes et de la Vienne
2008
5th Overall Tour du Poitou Charentes et de la Vienne
6th Grand Prix de la Somme
2009
1st Stage 1 Route du Sud
4th Overall Tour du Poitou Charentes et de la Vienne
7th Boucles de l'Aulne
10th Tour du Doubs
2010
8th Overall La Tropicale Amissa Bongo

1st Stage 3
