= Eddy Seigneur =

French cyclist

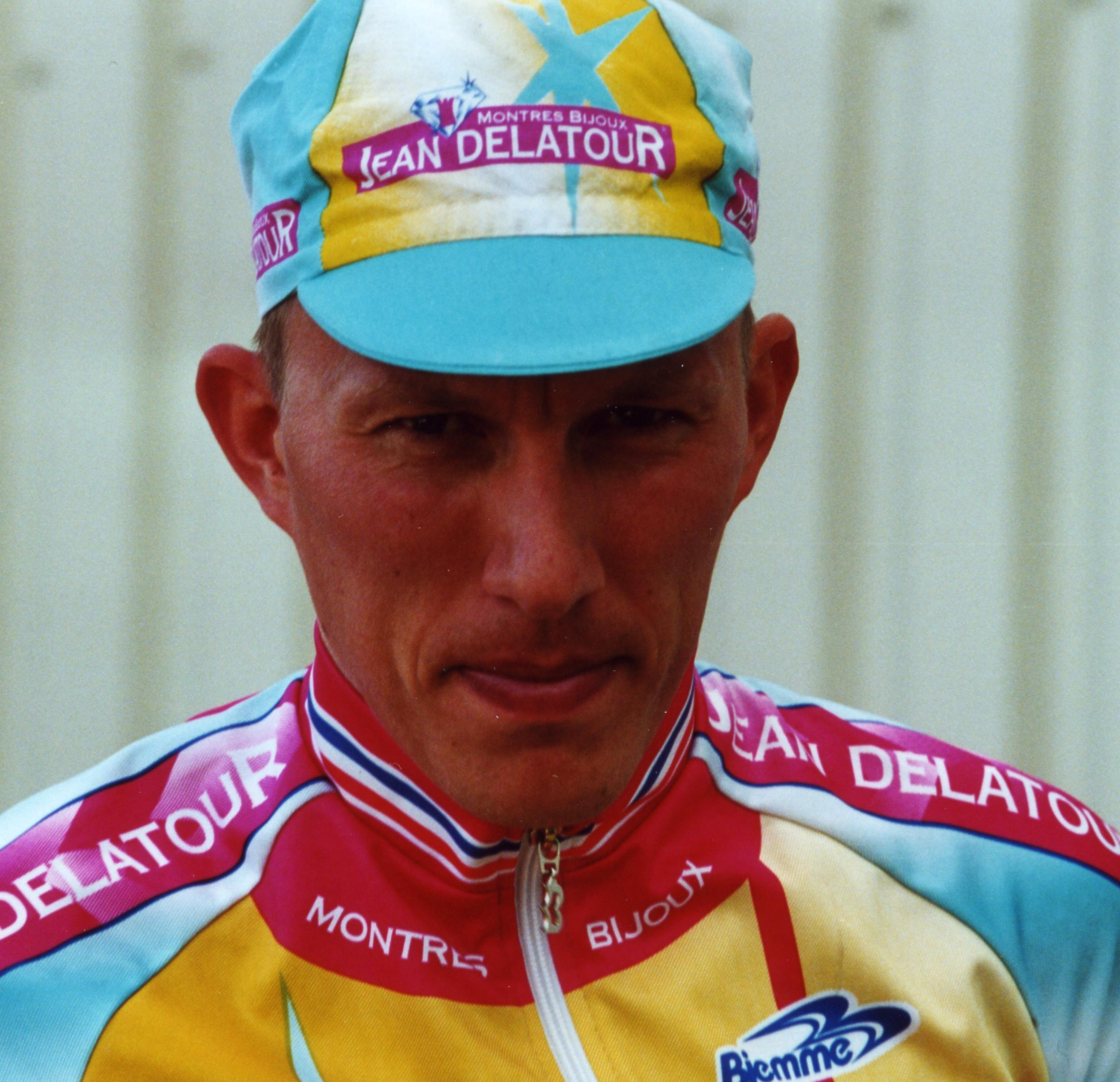

Personal information
- Full name: Eddy Seigneur
- Born: 15 February 1969 (age 57) Beauvais, France

Cycling career
- Sport: Cycling
- Discipline: Road
- Role: Rider

Professional teams
- 1990–1996: Z–Tomasso
- 1997: Française des Jeux
- 1998: GAN
- 1999: Saint-Quentin–Oktos–MBK
- 2000–2005: Jean Delatour

Major wins
- Grand Tour Tour de France 1 individual stage (1994) Stage races Four Days of Dunkirk (1994) One-day races and Classics National Road Race Championships (1995) National Time Trial Championships (1996, 2002, 2003, 2004)

Eddy Seigneur (born 15 February 1969) is a French former professional road racing cyclist. His sporting career began with VC Beauvais Oise. He won the Champs-Élysées stage in 1994 Tour de France. He is a four-time French national time trial champion and he also won the French road race championship in 1995.

== Major results ==
1990
1st Grand Prix de la ville de Nogent-sur-Oise
1993
1st Grand Prix de Rennes
2nd Grand Prix d'Isbergues
2nd Grand Prix d'Ouverture La Marseillaise
3rd Overall Four Days of Dunkirk

1st Stage 2b (ITT)

3rd Grand Prix des Nations
3rd Chrono des Nations
1994
1st Overall Four Days of Dunkirk

1st Stage 2b (ITT)

1st Stage 21 Tour de France
1st Chateau–Chinon
1st Dun Le Palestel
1995
1st National Road Race Championships
1st Stage 1 Circuit Cycliste Sarthe
1st Dijon (Criterium)
1996
Aubervilliers
1st National Time Trial Championships
1st Overall Tour du Poitou-Charentes

1st Stage 5 (ITT)

1997
1st Overall Circuit des Mines

1st Stage 3 (ITT)

2nd Duo Normand (with Andrea Peron)
4th Grand Prix des Nations
2000
2nd National Time Trial Championships
2001
1st Stage 7 Circuit des Mines (ITT)
2nd Classic Haribo
3rd National Time Trial Championships
2002
1st National Time Trial Championships
2003
1st National Time Trial Championships
Volta ao Alentejo

1st Stages 1 & 5 (ITT)

2004
1st National Time Trial Championships
1st Duo Normand (with Frédéric Finot)
5th Grand Prix des Nations
