= 2009 Chrono des Nations =

Race details
- Dates: 18 October 2009
- Stages: 1
- Distance: 48.5 km (30.14 mi)
- Winning time: 1h 00' 09"

Results
	Winner	Alexander Vinokourov (KAZ)
	Second	Jean-Christophe Péraud (FRA)
	Third	Yuriy Krivtsov (UKR)

The 2009 Chrono des Nations was the 28th edition of the Chrono des Nations cycle race and was held on 18 October 2009. The race started and finished in Les Herbiers. The race was won by Alexander Vinokourov.

== General classification ==
Final general classification

Rank	Rider	Time
1	Alexander Vinokourov (KAZ)	1h 00' 09"
2	Jean-Christophe Péraud (FRA)	+ 1' 07"
3	Yuriy Krivtsov (UKR)	+ 1' 12"
4	Maxime Monfort (BEL)	+ 1' 42"
5	Florian Morizot (FRA)	+ 2' 13"
6	David Lelay (FRA)	+ 2' 23"
7	Philippe Gilbert (BEL)	+ 2' 34"
8	Andriy Hrivko (UKR)	+ 3' 01"
9	Julien Fouchard (FRA)	+ 3' 12"
10	Thomas Voeckler (FRA)	+ 3' 14"
