= Julien Fouchard =

French cyclist

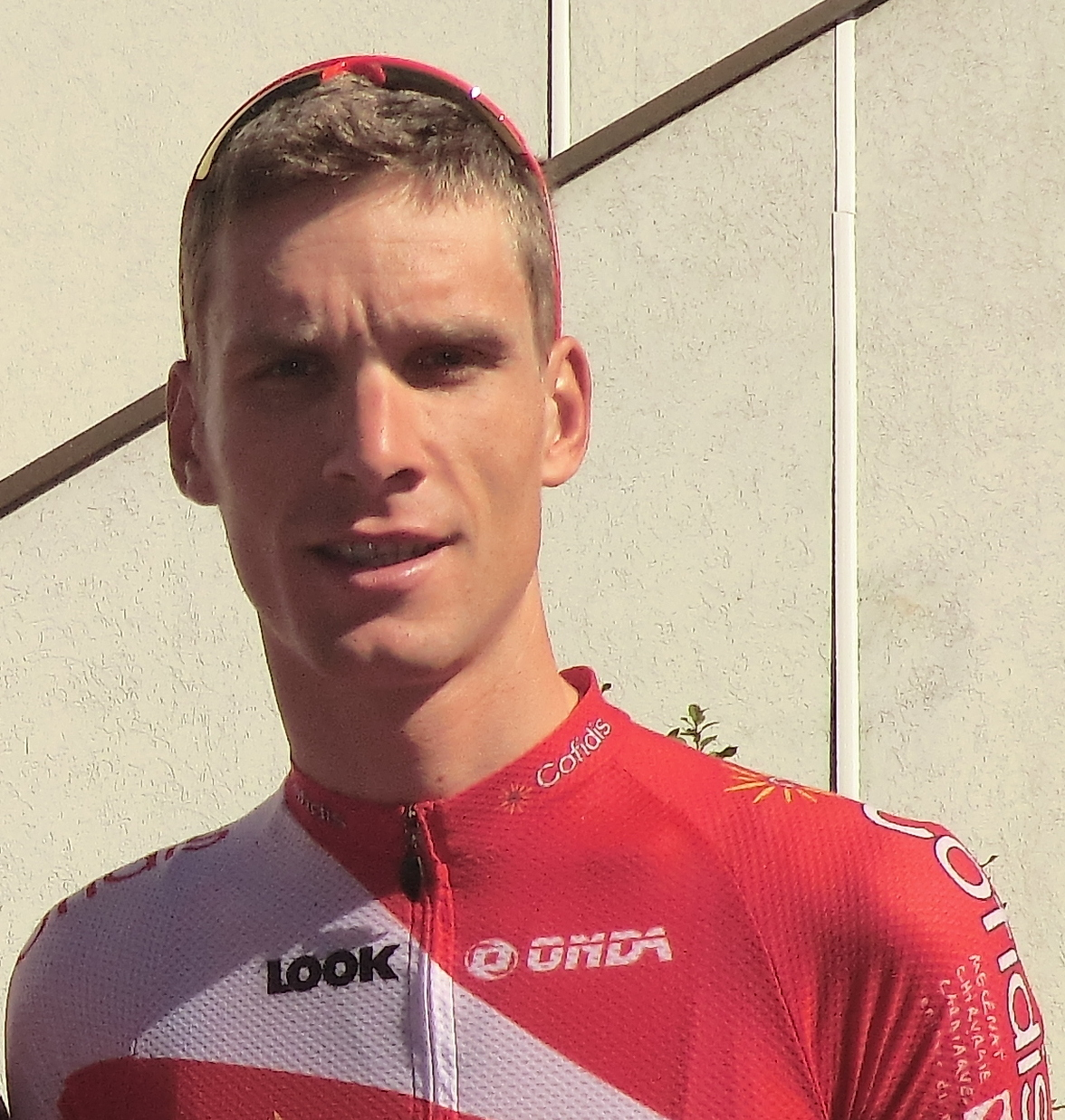
- Fouchard at the 2013 Tour de l'Ain.

Personal information
- Full name: Julien Fouchard
- Born: 20 June 1986 (age 40) Coutances, France
- Height: 1.88 m (6 ft 2 in)
- Weight: 73 kg (161 lb; 11.5 st)

Cycling career
- Sport: Cycling
- Current team: Retired
- Discipline: Road
- Role: Rider

Amateur teams
- 2008–2009: Côtes d'Armor Cyclisme
- 2009: Cofidis (stagiaire)

Professional team
- 2010–2014: Cofidis

Julien Fouchard (born 20 June 1986) is a French former road bicycle racer, who rode professionally between 2010 and 2014, for UCI Professional Continental team Cofidis. He competed in the 2012 Tour de France where he finished in 149th position.

== Major results ==
2008
1st Chrono des Nations Espoirs
3rd Paris–Tours Espoirs
2009
1st Overall Tour de Bretagne

1st Stage 2

5th Overall Boucles de la Mayenne
7th Duo Normand (with Christophe Kern)
9th Tour de Vendée
9th Chrono des Nations
2010
7th Duo Normand (with Amaël Moinard)
9th Overall Mi-Août Bretonne
2013
4th Boucles de l'Aulne
2014
6th Chrono des Nations
7th La Roue Tourangelle

=== Grand Tour general classification results timeline ===
Grand Tour	2010	2011	2012
Giro d'Italia	119	—	—
Tour de France	—	—	149
Vuelta a España	—	137	—

Legend
—	Did not compete
DNF	Did not finish
