= Jean Nuttli =

Swiss cyclist

Personal information
- Born: 2 January 1974 (age 52) Kriens, Switzerland

Cycling career
- Sport: Cycling
- Current team: Retired
- Discipline: Road
- Role: Rider
- Rider type: Time trialist

Professional teams
- 2001: Phonak
- 2002: Saint-Quentin–Oktos
- 2003–2004: Volksbank–Ideal
- 2006: Rietumu Banka–Riga

Jean Nuttli (born 2 January 1974 in Kriens) is a Swiss former cyclist.

== Major results ==
2000
1st Chrono des Herbiers
2001
1st National Time Trial Championships
1st Stage 4 Tour du Poitou-Charentes
1st Chrono des Herbiers
1st Stage 4 Circuit de la Sarthe
3rd GP Eddy Merckx
3rd Grand Prix des Nations
2002
1st Stage 4 Circuit de la Sarthe
2nd National Time Trial Championships
2003
1st Prologue Jadranska Magistrala
1st Overall Brandenburg-Rundfahrt

1st Stage 1

1st Duo Normand (with Philippe Schnyder)
3rd National Time Trial Championships
2004
3rd National Time Trial Championships
