= 2000 UCI Road World Championships – Men's time trial =

Men's Individual Time Trial
2000 UCI Road World Championships
- Rainbow jersey

Race details
- Dates: 12 October 2000
- Stages: 1
- Distance: 47.6 km (29.58 mi)
- Winning time: 56' 21.75"

Results
	Winner	Serhiy Honchar (UKR)	(Ukraine)
	Second	Michael Rich (GER)	(Germany)
	Third	László Bodrogi (HUN)	(Hungary)

The Men's Individual Time Trial at the 2000 UCI Road World Championships was the 7th edition of the event. The race took place on 12 October 2000 in Plouay, France. The race was won by Serhiy Honchar of Ukraine.

== Final classification ==
General classification (1–10)

Rank	Rider	Time
1st place, gold medalist(s)	Serhiy Honchar (UKR)	56' 21.75"
2nd place, silver medalist(s)	Michael Rich (GER)	+ 10.20"
3rd place, bronze medalist(s)	László Bodrogi (HUN)	+ 24.02"
4	Chris Boardman (GBR)	+ 1' 16.33"
5	Abraham Olano (ESP)	+ 1' 28.38"
6	Dario Frigo (ITA)	+ 1' 59.59"
7	Jens Voigt (GER)	+ 1' 59.73"
8	Sergiy Matveyev (UKR)	+ 2' 05.51"
9	Andrey Teteryuk (KAZ)	+ 2' 06.71"
10	Marco Pinotti (ITA)	+ 2' 15.77"
