= Francisque Teyssier =

French cyclist

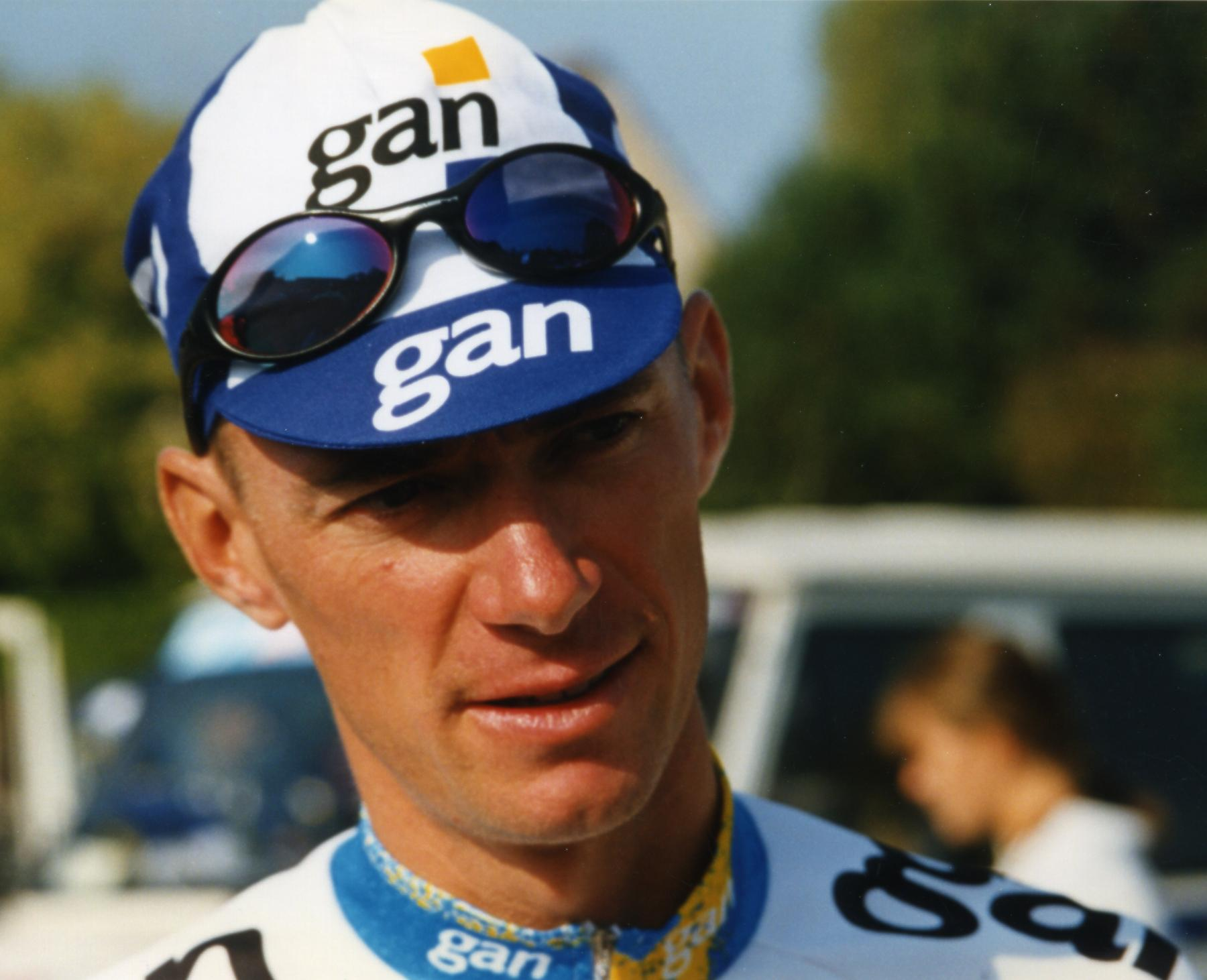
- Teyssier at the 1997 Paris–Tours

Personal information
- Born: 2 January 1969 (age 57) Salon-de-Provence, France

Cycling career
- Sport: Cycling
- Current team: Retired
- Discipline: Road
- Role: Rider
- Rider type: Time trialist; Rouleur

Professional teams
- 1993–1995: Festina–Lotus
- 1996: Aubervilliers 93
- 1997: GAN
- 1998: Mutuelle de Seine-et-Marne
- 1999: Festina–Lotus
- 2000: Jean Delatour

Major wins
- One-day races and Classics National Time Trial Championships (1997, 2000) Grand Prix des Nations (1998)

Francisque Teyssier (born 2 January 1969 in Salon-de-Provence) is a French former professional racing cyclist. He competed in the 1995 Giro d'Italia, 1996 Tour de France and the 1997 Vuelta a España. He also won the French National Time Trial Championships twice, in 1997 and 2000.

== Major results ==
1992
1st Overall Rhône-Alpes Isère Tour
1st Grand Prix de France
2nd Overall Vuelta a los Pirineos
1993
3rd Road race, National Road Championships
1994
1st Stages 3 & 6 Tour du Poitou-Charentes
7th Overall Route du Sud
1995
1st Stage 5 Tour de l'Ain
4th Grand Prix d'Ouverture La Marseillaise
1997
1st Time trial, National Road Championships
3rd Chrono des Nations
1998
1st Grand Prix des Nations
1st Stage 3b Regio-Tour (ITT)
2nd Time trial, National Road Championships
3rd Chrono des Nations
10th Grand Prix de Villers-Cotterêts
2000
1st Time trial, National Road Championships
8th Chrono des Herbiers
