= Romain Bacon =

French cyclist (born 1990)

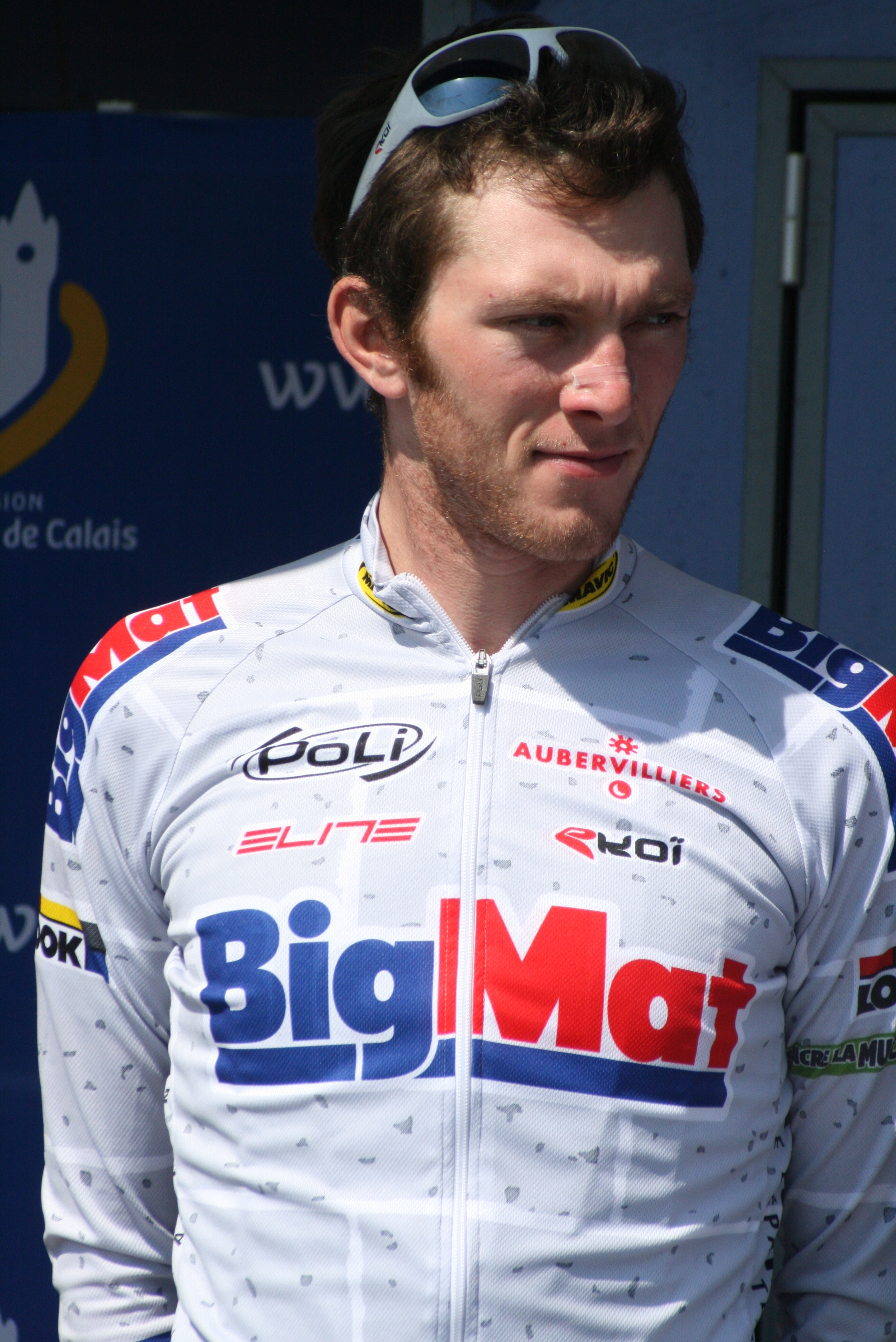

Personal information
- Born: 8 March 1990 (age 36) Le Blanc-Mesnil, France

Cycling career
- Sport: Cycling
- Current team: Retired
- Discipline: Road
- Role: Rider
- Rider type: Time trialist

Amateur teams
- 2007: CM Aubervilliers 93
- 2008: CYC La Courneuve
- 2009–2010: CM Aubervilliers 93
- 2014–2015: Vulco–VC Vaulx-en-Velin
- 2016–2022: CC Nogent-sur-Oise

Professional teams
- 2010: BigMat–Auber 93 (stagiaire)
- 2011–2013: BigMat–Auber 93

Romain Bacon (born 8 March 1990 in Le Blanc-Mesnil) is a French former professional road cyclist.

== Major results ==
2007
2nd Chrono des Nations Juniors
2008
1st Time trial, National Junior Road Championships
1st Chrono des Nations Juniors
5th Time trial, European Junior Road Championships
9th Paris–Roubaix Juniors
2010
2nd Chrono des Nations
2012
3rd Paris–Troyes
2018
4th Grand Prix des Marbriers
2019
2nd Flèche Ardennaise
