= Jasper De Plus =

Belgian cyclist

Personal information
- Born: 11 June 1997 (age 29) Aalst, Belgium

Cycling career
- Sport: Cycling
- Current team: Intermarché–Wanty
- Discipline: Road
- Role: Rider
- Rider type: Time trialist

Amateur teams
- 2016: RH+–Polartec–Fundación A.Contador
- 2017–2019: Home Solution–Anmapa–Soenens

Professional teams
- 2020: Circus–Wanty Gobert
- 2021–: Intermarché–Wanty–Gobert Matériaux

Jasper De Plus (born 11 June 1997) is a Belgian cyclist, who currently rides for UCI WorldTeam Intermarché–Wanty. He is the younger brother of fellow racing cyclist Laurens De Plus.

== Major results ==
2015
8th Overall Ronde des Vallées
2019
1st Chrono des Nations U23
2nd Time trial, National Under–23 Road Championships
