= Sébastien Joly =

French cyclist

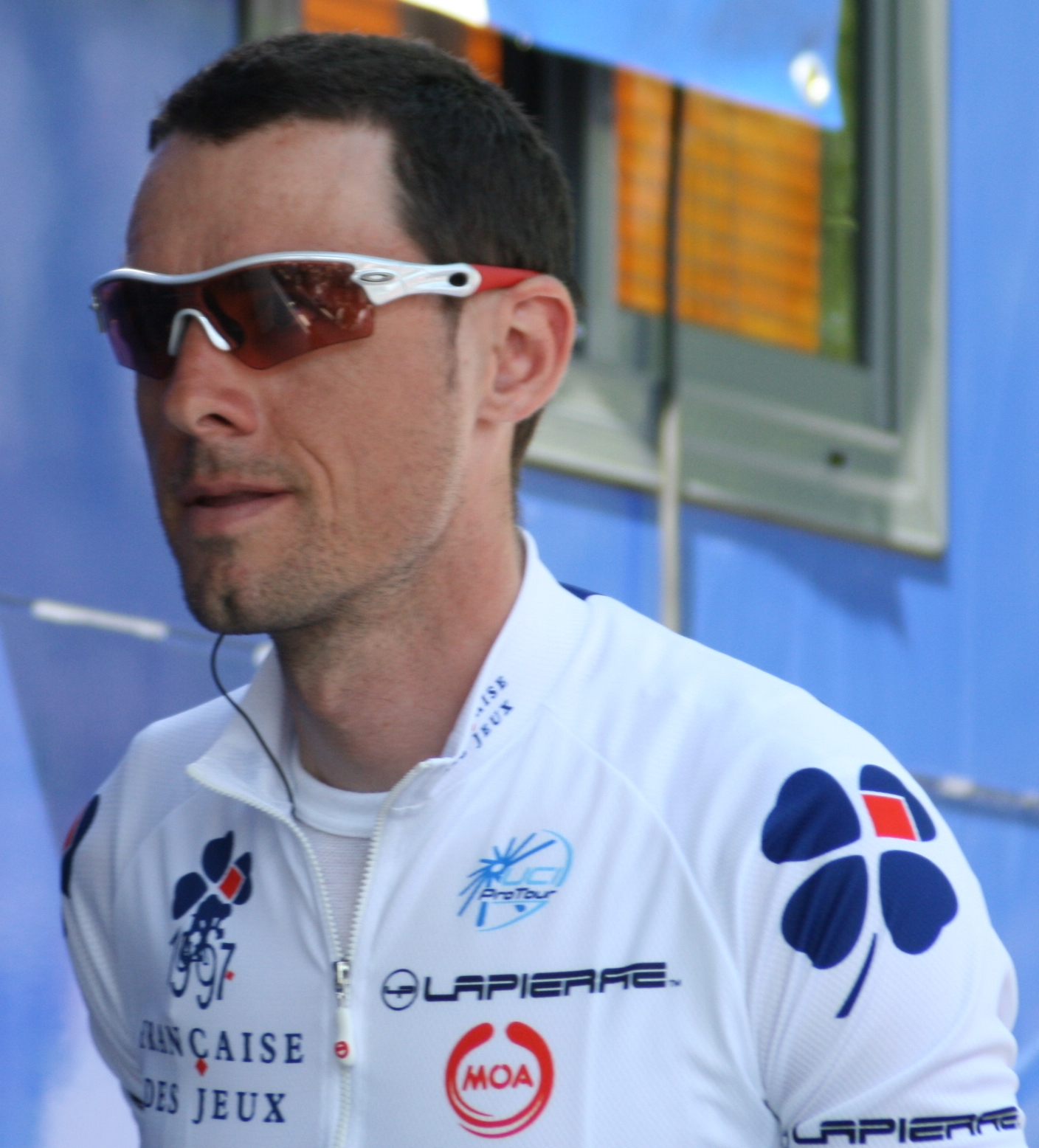

Personal information
- Full name: Sébastien Joly
- Born: 25 June 1979 (age 47) Tournon, France
- Height: 1.80 m (5 ft 11 in)
- Weight: 74 kg (163 lb)

Cycling career
- Sport: Cycling
- Current team: Groupama–FDJ United
- Disciplines: Road; Directeur sportif
- Role: Rider

Amateur team
- 1999: Vendee U Pays-de-la-Loire

Professional teams
- 2000–2002: Bonjour
- 2003: Jean Delatour
- 2004–2005: Crédit Agricole
- 2006–2009: Française des Jeux
- 2010–2011: Saur–Sojasun

Managerial teams
- 2013: Team Europcar
- 2015–: FDJ

Sébastien Joly (born 25 June 1979 in Tournon-sur-Rhône) is a French former professional road racing cyclist, who competed as a professional between 2000 and 2011. In 2006, he joined the Française des Jeux on the UCI ProTour. He was diagnosed with testicular cancer on 25 June 2007, his 28th birthday. He underwent an operation and then completed radiotherapy treatment on 11 September. Joly joined former team FDJ as a coach for the 2015 season.

== Major results ==
1999
1st Paris–Roubaix Espoirs
8th Overall Le Triptyque des Monts et Châteaux
2000
1st Stage 5 Circuit des Mines
2001
6th Tro-Bro Léon
2003
1st Route Adélie de Vitré
Tour du Limousin

1st Points classification
1st Young rider classification

2005
1st Overall Tour du Limousin

1st Stage 1

4th Grand Prix d'Ouverture La Marseillaise
5th Road race, National Road Championships
10th Brabantse Pijl
2007
1st Paris–Camembert
2009
6th Overall Circuit de Lorraine

1st Stage 5

9th Tour du Finistère
2011
6th Overall Route du Sud
6th Paris–Camembert

=== Grand Tour general classification results timeline ===
Grand Tour	2004	2005	2006	2007	2008	2009
Giro d'Italia	—	—	—	—	—	—
Tour de France	146	106	DNF	—	—	DNF
Vuelta a España	—	DNF	68	—	DNF	—

Legend
—	Did not compete
DNF	Did not finish
