= Chrono des Nations =

French one-day road cycling race

Race details
- Date: Mid-October
- Region: Vendée, France
- Local name: Chrono des Nations – Les Herbiers Vendée (in French)
- Discipline: Road race
- Competition: UCI Europe Tour
- Type: Individual time trial
- Web site: www.chronodesnations.com

Men's history
- First edition: 1982
- Editions: 44 (as of 2026)
- First winner: Gary Dowdell (GBR)
- Most wins: Pascal Lance (FRA) (4 wins)
- Most recent: Remco Evenepoel (BEL)

Women's history
- First edition: 1988
- Editions: 39 (as of 2026)
- First winner: Jeannie Longo (FRA)
- Most wins: Jeannie Longo (FRA) (6 wins)
- Most recent: Maeva Squiban (FRA)

Chrono des Nations – Les Herbiers Vendée is a single-day individual time trial road bicycle race held annually in October in Les Herbiers, Vendée, France. Since 2005, the race is organized as a 1.1 event on the UCI Europe Tour.

It was originally called Chrono des Herbiers but in 2006 the race merged with the now defunct Grand Prix des Nations to create the currently called Chrono des Nations.

== Winners ==
=== Men ===
==== Elite ====
Year	Country	Rider	Team
1982	Great Britain	Gary Dowdell	Wolber Spidel
1983	Great Britain	Dave Akam	Athletic Club de Boulogne-Billancourt
1984	France	Patrice Esnault	Skil-Sem
1985	France	Bernard Richard	Mercier
1986	France	Franck Petiteau	
1987	France	Pascal Lance	Toshiba-La Vie Claire
1988	France	Pascal Lance	Toshiba-Look
1989	Netherlands	Marco Jeletich	
1990	Sweden	Jan Karlsson	Acceptcard Pro Cycling
1991	Sweden	Jan Karlsson	Acceptcard Pro Cycling
1992	Lithuania	Arturas Kasputis	Postobón-Manzana
1993	Great Britain	Chris Boardman	GAN
1994	France	Pascal Lance	GAN
1995	France	Pascal Lance	GAN
1996	Great Britain	Chris Boardman	GAN
1997	Ukraine	Serhiy Honchar	Aki-Safi
1998	Ukraine	Serhiy Honchar	Cantina Tollo–Alexia Alluminio
1999	Ukraine	Serhiy Honchar	Vini Caldirola
2000	Switzerland	Jean Nuttli	Phonak
2001	Switzerland	Jean Nuttli	Phonak
2002	Germany	Michael Rich	Gerolsteiner
2003	Germany	Michael Rich	Gerolsteiner
2004	Belgium	Bert Roesems	Relax–Bodysol
2005	Czech Republic	Ondřej Sosenka	Acqua & Sapone–Adria Mobil
2006	Latvia	Raivis Belohvoščiks	C.B. Immobiliare–Universal Caffè
2007	Hungary	László Bodrogi	Crédit Agricole
2008	Netherlands	Stef Clement	Bouygues Télécom
2009	Kazakhstan	Alexandre Vinokourov	Astana
2010	Great Britain	David Millar	Garmin–Transitions
2011	Germany	Tony Martin	HTC–Highroad
2012	Germany	Tony Martin	Omega Pharma–Quick-Step
2013	Germany	Tony Martin	Omega Pharma–Quick-Step
2014	France	Sylvain Chavanel	IAM Cycling
2015	Belarus	Vasil Kiryienka	Team Sky
2016	Belarus	Vasil Kiryienka	Team Sky
2017	Denmark	Martin Toft Madsen	BHS–Almeborg Bornholm
2018	Denmark	Martin Toft Madsen	BHS–Almeborg Bornholm
2019	Netherlands	Jos van Emden	Team Jumbo–Visma
2020	No race due to the COVID-19 pandemic		
2021	Switzerland	Stefan Küng	Groupama–FDJ
2022	Switzerland	Stefan Küng	Groupama–FDJ
2023	Great Britain	Joshua Tarling	INEOS Grenadiers
2024	Switzerland	Stefan Küng	Groupama–FDJ
2025	Great Britain	Joshua Tarling	INEOS Grenadiers
2026	Belgium	Remco Evenepoel	Red Bull–Bora–Hansgrohe

==== Under-23 ====
Year	Winner	Second	Third
1993	(France) Sébastien Noel	(France) Samuel Renaux	(Russia) Roman Krylov
1994	(France) Sébastien Noel	(France) Samuel Renaux	(France) Gilles Rouyau
1995	(France) Anthony Morin	(France) Guillaume Auger	(France) Damien Nazon
1996	(France) Florent Brard	(Hungary) László Bodrogi	(France) Christophe Barbier
1997	(France) Guillaume Auger	(Hungary) László Bodrogi	(Italy) Stephano Panetta
1998	(Russia) Oleg Joukov	(Hungary) László Bodrogi	(France) Florent Brard
1999	(Ukraine) Yuriy Krivtsov	(Luxembourg) Christian Poos	(France) Eric Trokimo
2000	(France) Niels Brouzes	(Ukraine) Yuriy Krivtsov	(Poland) Mariusz Witecki
2001	(Ukraine) Yuriy Krivtsov	(France) Xavier Pache	(France) David Le Lay
2002	(Italy) Gianluca Moi	(Germany) Jochen Rochau	(France) Damien Monier
2003	(France) Damien Monier	(France) Émilien-Benoît Bergès	(France) Jean Zen
2004	(Belgium) Olivier Kaisen	(France) Florian Morizot	(France) Nicolas Rousseau
2005	(France) Dimitri Champion	(Germany) Mickaël Muck	(France) Nicolas Baldo
2006	(Belgium) Dominique Cornu	(France) Yoann Offredo	(France) Stéphane Rossetto
2007	(Denmark) Michael Færk Christensen	(France) Yoann Offredo	(France) Alexandre Roux
2008	(France) Julien Fouchard	(France) Fabien Taillefer	(Denmark) Daniel Kreutzfeldt
2009	(France) Romain Lemarchand	(France) Étienne Pieret	(France) Nicolas Boisson
2010	(United Kingdom) Alex Dowsett	(France) Romain Bacon	(France) Nicolas Bonnet
2011	(France) Yoann Paillot	(France) Erwan Téguel	(France) Pierre Lebreton
2012	(France) Yoann Paillot	(United Kingdom) Joseph Perrett	(France) Alexis Guérin
2013	(Republic of Ireland) Ryan Mullen	(France) Bruno Armirail	(France) Alexis Guérin
2014	(France) Alexis Dulin	(France) Rémi Cavagna	(United Kingdom) Edmund Bradbury
2015	(Norway) Truls Engen Korsæth	(Germany) Julian Braun	(France) Louis Pijourlet
2016	(France) Louis Louvet	(France) Maxime Roger	(France) Louis Pijourlet
2017	(Denmark) Mathias Norsgaard	(Denmark) Christoffer Lisson	(France) Louis Louvet
2018	(Denmark) Mathias Norsgaard	(France) Alexys Brunel	(United Kingdom) Matt Langworthy
2019	(Belgium) Jasper De Plus	(Denmark) Mathias Norsgaard	(France) Clément Davy
2020	No race
2021	(France) Antoine Devanne	(Belgium) Branko Huys	(Germany) Jon Knolle
2022	(Belgium) Alec Segaert	(Norway) Søren Wærenskjold	(France) Pierre Thierry
2023	(Poland) Kacper Gieryk	(United Kingdom) Maximilian Cushway	(Canada) Jonas Walton
2024	(Sweden) Jakob Söderqvist	(Italy) Luca Giaimi	(Belgium) Jonathan Vervenne
2025	(France) Arthur Blaise	(Belgium) Ferre Geeraerts	(Belgium) Aldo Taillieu

==== Junior ====
Year	Winner	Second	Third
1997	(France) Fabrice Salanson	(France) Anthony Michelet	(France) Sandy Casar
1998	(France) Eric Trokimo	(France) Anthony Geslin	(France) Guillaume Reux
1999	(Seychelles) Hedson Mathieu	(France) Ludovic Lanceleur	(France) Niels Brouzes
2000	(France) Nicolas Rousseau	(France) Charly Carlier	(France) Alexandre Pichot
2001	(France) Nicolas Rousseau	(Belgium) Olivier Kaisen	(France) Thierry Hupond
2002	(France) Sébastien Coeffier	(France) Romain Feillu	(France) Sébastien Turgot
2003	(France) Damien Gaudin	(France) Anthony Martin	(Ukraine) Dimitri Krivtsov
2004	(France) Alexandre Binet	(France) Anthony Martin	(France) Damien Gaudin
2005	(France) Sébastien Ivars	(France) Tony Gallopin	(France) Stéphane Rossetto
2006	(France) Tony Gallopin	(France) Étienne Pieret	(France) Yann Moritz
2007	(France) Fabien Taillefer	(France) Romain Bacon	(France) Aurélien Corbin
2008	(France) Romain Bacon	(France) Kévin Labèque	(France) Adrien Petit
2009	(France) Anthony Saux	(France) Yoann Paillot	(France) Jimmy Turgis
2010	(France) Alliaume Leblond	(France) Jauffrey Bétouigt-Suire	(France) Pierre Almeida
2011	(Netherlands) Paul Moerland	(France) Guillaume Thévenot	(France) Thomas Bourreau
2012	(Republic of Ireland) Ryan Mullen	(France) David Michaud	(France) Maxime Piveteau
2013	(Belgium) Igor Decraene	(France) Élie Gesbert	(Belgium) Martin Palm
2014	(Italy) Filippo Ganna	(France) Thomas Denis	(Belgium) Martin Palm
2015	(Ukraine) Nazar Lahodych	(France) Julien Souton	(France) Thomas Denis
2016	(France) Alexys Brunel	(Belgium) Sébastien Grignard	(France) Émilien Jeannière
2017	(Belgium) Sébastien Grignard	(France) Antoine Raugel	(France) Thomas Delphis
2018	(Belgium) Remco Evenepoel	(France) Donavan Grondin	(United Kingdom) Joshua Sandman
2019	(France) Hugo Page	(Netherlands) Joris Kroon	(France) Alex Baudin
2020	No race
2021	(Belgium) Alec Segaert	(Republic of Ireland) Darren Rafferty	(France) Eddy Le Huitouze
2022	(United Kingdom) Joshua Tarling	(France) Titouan Fontaine	(France) Baptiste Gillet
2023	(Italy) Davide Donati	(United Kingdom) Finlay Tarling	(Republic of Ireland) Adam Rafferty
2024	(Republic of Ireland) Seth Dunwoody	(France) Ellande Larronde	(Belgium) Thibaut Van Damme
2025	(Bulgaria) Nicholas Van der Merwe	(Czech Republic) Jakub Patras	(France) Luc Royer

=== Women ===
Year	Country	Rider	Team
1987	France	Jeannie Longo	
1988	Italy	Maria Canins	
1989	Italy	Maria Canins	
1990	Netherlands	Astrid Schop	
1991	France	Nathalie Gendron	
1992	France	Jeannie Longo	
1993	France	Roselyne Riou	
1994	France	Marion Clignet	
1995	France	Jeannie Longo	
1996	France	Chrystèle Richard	
1997	Russia	Zulfiya Zabirova	
1998	Russia	Zulfiya Zabirova	Acca Due O–Lorena Camicie
1999	Russia	Zulfiya Zabirova	Acca Due O–Lorena Camicie
2000	France	Jeannie Longo	
2001	France	Edwige Pitel	
2002	Russia	Zulfiya Zabirova	USC Chirio
2003	Australia	Margaret Hemsley	Equipe Nürnberger Versicherung
2004	France	Edwige Pitel	
2005	France	Edwige Pitel	
2006	Switzerland	Priska Doppmann	Univega Pro Cycling Team
2007	Sweden	Susanne Ljungskog	Team Flexpoint
2008	Sweden	Susanne Ljungskog	Team Flexpoint
2009	France	Jeannie Longo	Team Pro Féminin Les Carroz
2010	France	Jeannie Longo	
2011	United States	Amber Neben	Team HTC–Highroad Women
2012	United States	Amber Neben	Team Specialized-lululemon
2013	Ukraine	Hanna Solovey	
2014	Ukraine	Hanna Solovey	
2015	Russia	Tatiana Antoshina	Servetto Footon
2016	Belgium	Ann-Sophie Duyck	Topsport Vlaanderen–Etixx
2017	France	Audrey Cordon-Ragot	Wiggle High5 Pro Cycling
2018	Uzbekistan	Olga Zabelinskaya	Cogeas–Mettler Pro Cycling Team
2019	United States	Leah Thomas	Bigla Pro Cycling
2020	No race due to the COVID-19 pandemic		
2021	Switzerland	Marlen Reusser	Alé BTC Ljubljana
2022	Netherlands	Ellen van Dijk	Trek–Segafredo
2023	Austria	Anna Kiesenhofer	Israel Premier Tech Roland
2024	Australia	Grace Brown	FDJ–Suez
2025	Netherlands	Ellen van Dijk	Lidl–Trek
2025	France	Maeva Squiban	UAE Team L'Imad
