= Eddy Lembo =

French-Algerian cyclist

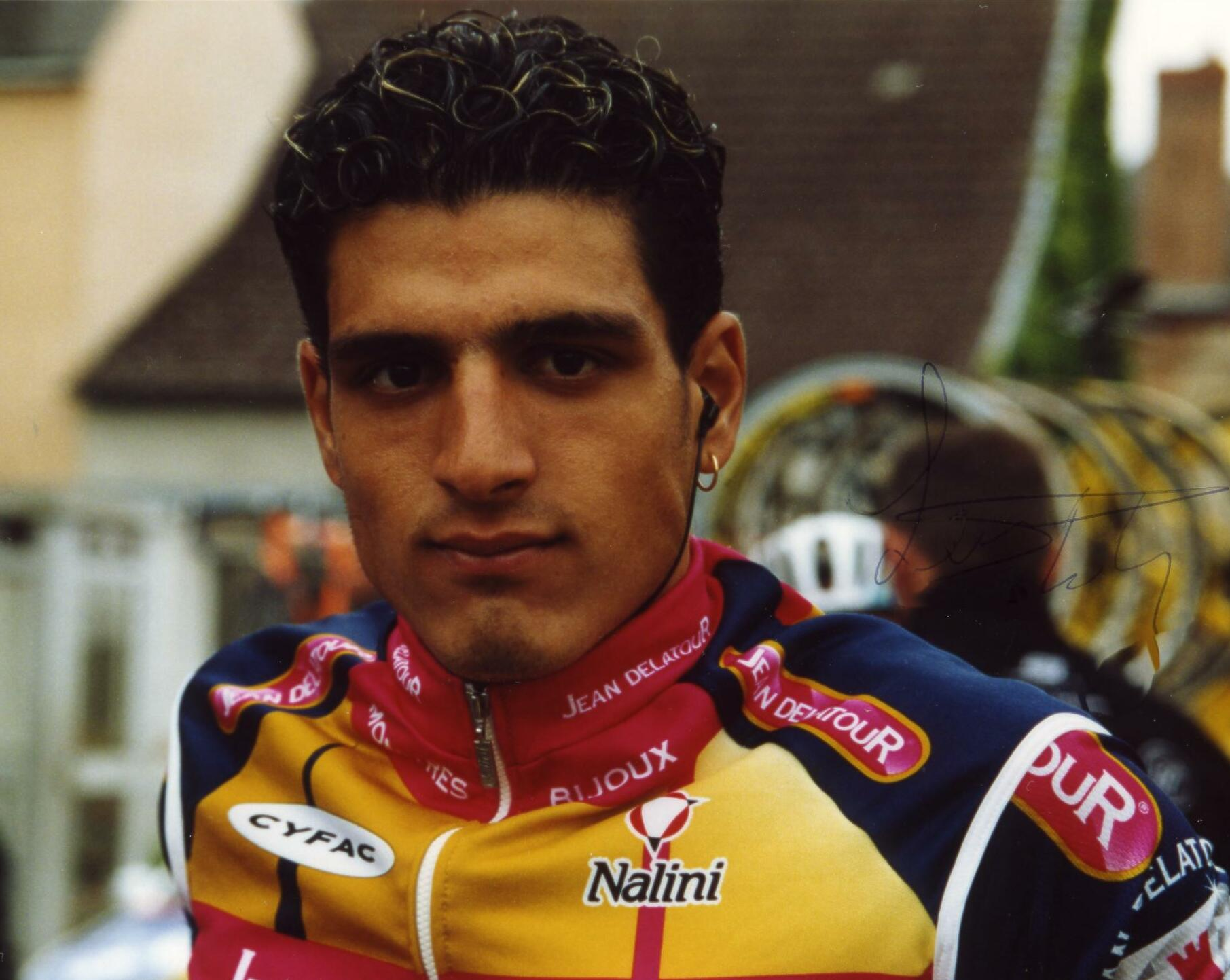

Personal information
- Born: 10 November 1980 (age 45) Miramas, France

Cycling career
- Sport: Cycling
- Current team: Retired
- Discipline: Road
- Role: Rider

Amateur teams
- 1998–1999: US Montauban
- 2007: Storez Ledecq Materiaux
- 2008: Espoir du Sud–Guadeloupe
- 2009: UFR Matouba Rayon d'Argent
- 2011: C.C. Multipôle Etang de Berre

Professional teams
- 2000–2001: Jean Delatour
- 2002–2003: Saint-Quentin–Oktos
- 2003: Palmans–Collstrop
- 2004: Mr. Bookmaker–Palmans–Collstrop
- 2004: Oktos–Saint-Quentin
- 2006: Flanders
- 2007: Jartazi–Promo Fashion

Eddy Lembo (born 10 November 1980) is a French-Algerian former professional road cyclist.

== Major results ==
1997
2nd Road race, French National Junior Road Championships
1998
1st Overall Tour de Lorraine
2001
1st Tour du Doubs
3rd Tro-Bro Léon
6th Grand Prix de Wallonie
2002
1st Stage 1 Tour de Suisse
3rd Tour du Finistère
4th A Travers le Morbihan
6th Route Adélie
2003
7th Sparkassen Giro Bochum
2004
10th GP de Villers-Cotterêts
2008
1st Stage 1 Tour de Guadeloupe
2009
1st Stage 1 Tour du Conseil général de Guadeloupe
1st Stage 1 Tour de Marie Galante
