= 2001 Tro-Bro Léon =

Race details
- Dates: 3 June 2001
- Stages: 1
- Distance: 188.8 km (117.3 mi)
- Winning time: 4h 44' 33"

Results
	Winner	Jacky Durand (FRA)
	Second	Erwin Thijs (BEL)
	Third	Eddy Lembo (ALG)

The 2001 Tro-Bro Léon was the 18th edition of the Tro-Bro Léon cycle race and was held on 3 June 2001. The race was won by Jacky Durand.

== General classification ==
Final general classification

Rank	Rider	Time
1	Jacky Durand (FRA)	4h 44' 33"
2	Erwin Thijs (BEL)	+ 2"
3	Eddy Lembo (ALG)	+ 7"
4	Frédéric Lecrosnier (FRA)	+ 26"
5	Rubén Díaz de Cerio (ESP)	+ 1' 05"
6	Sébastien Joly (FRA)	+ 1' 06"
7	Samuel Sánchez (ESP)	+ 1' 55"
8	Frédéric Guesdon (FRA)	+ 1' 55"
9	Franck Rénier (FRA)	+ 1' 55"
10	Thierry Gouvenou (FRA)	+ 2' 00"
