= László Bodrogi =

Hungarian-French cyclist (born 1976)

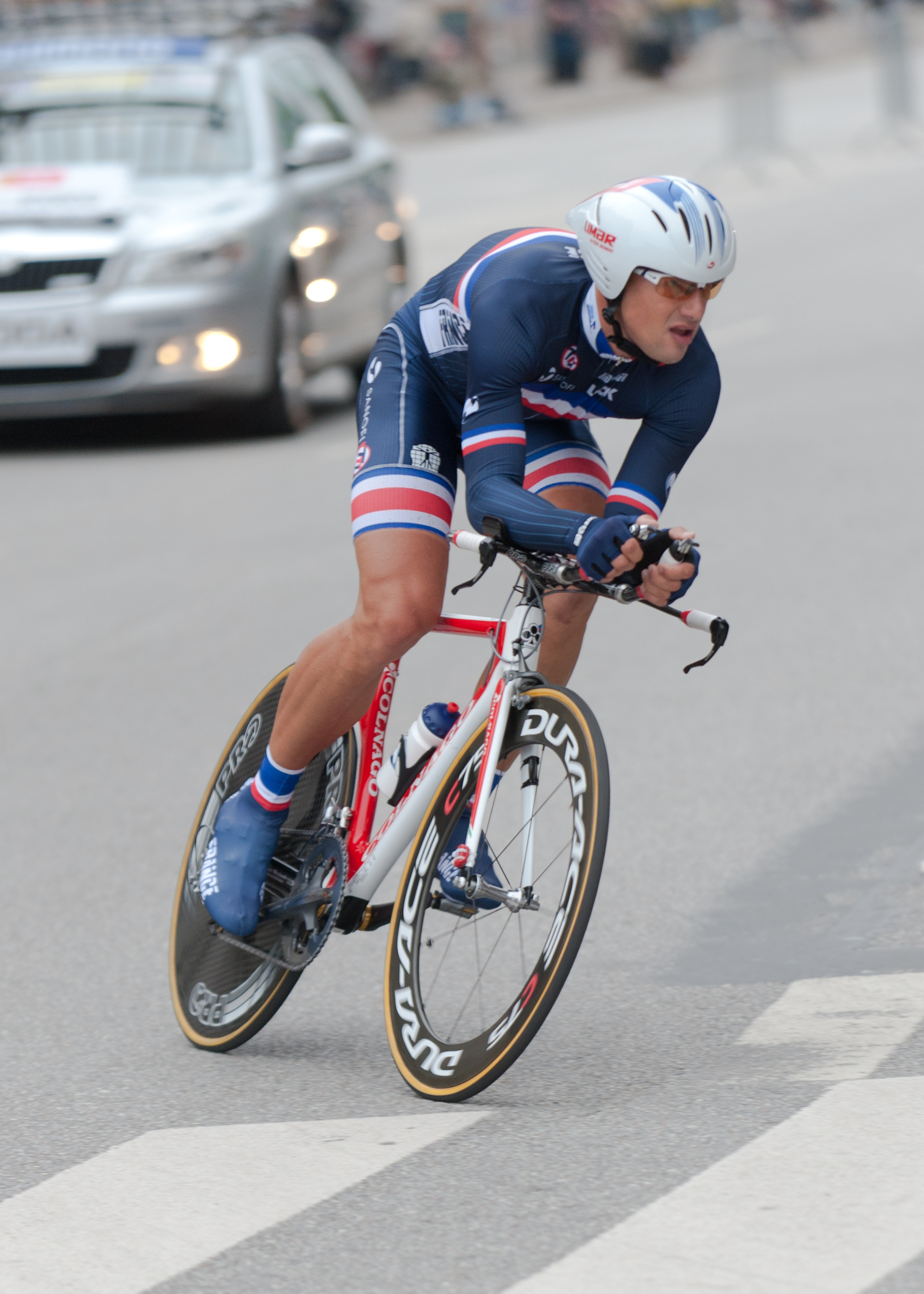
- Bodrogi during the time trials at the 2011 UCI Road World Championships

Personal information
- Full name: László Bodrogi
- Born: 11 December 1976 (age 49) Budapest, Hungary
- Height: 1.87 m (6 ft 2 in)
- Weight: 79 kg (174 lb)

Cycling career
- Sport: Cycling
- Current team: Retired
- Disciplines: Road and track
- Role: Rider
- Rider type: Time-trialist

Amateur teams
- 1991: FTC
- 1992: BVSC-Intertraverz
- 1993: KSI
- 1994: Stollwerck-FTC
- 1995–1996: AC Bisontine
- 1997–1998: VC Vaux-en-Velin
- 1999: CC Étupes

Professional teams
- 1999: Saint-Quentin–Oktos–MBK (stagiaire)
- 2000–2002: Mapei–Quick-Step
- 2003–2004: Quick-Step–Davitamon
- 2005–2008: Crédit Agricole
- 2009–2010: Team Katusha
- 2011–2012: Team Type 1–Sanofi Aventis

Major wins
- Stage races Tour de Luxembourg (2005) One-day races and Classics National Road Race Championships (1996, 2000, 2006) National Time Trial Championships (1997, 1998, 2000-04, 2006-08)
Medal record
Representing Hungary
Men's road bicycle racing
World Championships
Bronze medal – third place	2000 Plouay	Elite Men's Time Trial
Silver medal – second place	2007 Stuttgart	Elite Men's Time Trial

László Bodrogi (born 11 December 1976 in Budapest, Hungary) is a Hungarian and French former professional road bicycle racer, specializing in the individual time trial.

== Biography ==
László was born in 1976 in Budapest, Hungary. His father, László Bodrogi, managed his career from his childhood.

=== Early success in Hungary ===
In the nineties, Hungarian bicycle manufacturer Schwinn-Csepel (successor of Csepel) was his main sponsor. In turn, he was the main athlete of the company. Among other products, he tested and raced the Schwinn-Csepel magnesium alloy road frame. He competed in various Hungarian teams, including FTC (1991), BVSC-Intertraverz (1992), KSI (1993) and Stollwerck-FTC (1994).

=== Moving to France ===
In 1995, after his father got a job as a doctor in France, László settled down in France and started training in the AC Bisontine team. He quit his university studies to devote his life to his sports career. After a fruitful season in 1996, he was invited to VC Lyon (VC Vaux-en-Velin), the youth team of Festina. After Festina was shaken by the doping scandals of the Tour de France, Laszlo got little attention from the team. He moved on to CC Étupes in 1999.

=== Professional career ===
In 2000, he started his professional cycling career in Mapei–Quick-Step and won the bronze in the world championship. In 2007, he scored the best result of the Hungarian cycling history by winning the silver medal in the same discipline after Fabian Cancellara.

He raced in the Tour de France in 2005 and finished in 119th place. At the time, he was the only Hungarian cyclist to have participated in the Tour.

After gaining French citizenship in 2008, he rides for France now. Consequently, he resigned from participating in the Hungarian championship. Between 1997 and 2008, he won the national road champion title three and the individual time trial champion title ten times.

He suffered a leg injury at the Tour of Germany in 2008, resulting in an 8-month recovery period. After Credit Agricole ceased sponsoring its cycling team, László joined the Katusha team. In 2010, he started preparing for the world championship, although the riders are not qualified yet.

He lives with his family in Ney. He is married to a French woman, Catherine, and has two children.

== Career achievements ==
=== Major results ===
1996
1st Road race, National Road Championships
1st Stage 4 Tour of Hungary
2nd Chrono des Nations Espoirs
1997
National Road Championships

1st Time trial
3rd Road race

2nd Time trial, UCI Under-23 Road World Championships
2nd Paris–Roubaix Espoirs
2nd Chrono des Nations Espoirs
4th Time trial, European Under-23 Road Championships
1998
National Road Championships

1st Time trial
2nd Road race

1st Chrono Champenois
3rd Time trial, European Under-23 Road Championships
5th Time trial, UCI Under-23 Road World Championships
1999
4th Chrono des Herbiers
2000
National Road Championships

1st Road race
1st Time trial

1st Duo Normand (with Daniele Nardello)
1st Prologue Tour de Slovénie
1st Stage 5 Tour de Normandie
1st Prologue Vuelta a Argentina
3rd Time trial, UCI Road World Championships
3rd Chrono des Herbiers
3rd Grand Prix des Nations
9th Overall Circuit Franco-Belge
2001
1st Time trial, National Road Championships
1st Overall Volta ao Alentejo

1st Stage 5 (ITT)

1st Overall Giro della Liguria

1st Stage 3

1st Stages 3 & 7 (ITT) Tour de l'Avenir
1st Stage 4 Tour of Sweden
2nd Chrono des Herbiers
2nd Grand Prix des Nations
5th Josef Voegeli Memorial
5th Time trial, UCI Road World Championships
2002
1st Time trial, National Road Championships
1st Eddy Merckx Grand Prix (with Fabian Cancellara)
1st Prologue Paris–Nice
2nd Dwars door Vlaanderen
2nd Grand Prix des Nations
2nd Memorial Fausto Coppi
3rd Overall Danmark Rundt

1st Stage 4b (ITT)

4th Time trial, UCI Road World Championships
4th Chrono des Herbiers
4th GP de Fourmies
6th Overall Driedaagse van De Panne
2003
1st Time trial, National Road Championships
2nd Paris–Brussels
2nd Eddy Merckx Grand Prix
4th Ronde van Midden-Zeeland
5th Grand Prix des Nations
6th Chrono des Herbiers
2004
1st Time trial, National Road Championships
1st Stage 3b Three Days of De Panne
9th Overall Ronde van Nederland
2005
1st Overall Tour de Luxembourg
2nd Tour de Vendée
2006
National Road Championships

1st Road race
1st Time trial

1st Stage 6 Tour of Austria
2007
National Road Championships

1st Time trial
2nd Road race

1st Chrono des Herbiers
2nd Time trial, UCI Road World Championships
7th Tour du Doubs
10th Polynormande
2008
1st Time trial, National Road Championships
2nd Overall Volta ao Distrito de Santarém
2010
3rd Time trial, French National Road Championships
2011
4th Duo Normand
5th Paris–Tours
5th Time trial, French National Road Championships
6th Chrono des Nations
8th Overall Circuit Cycliste Sarthe
2012
3rd Overall Tour du Poitou-Charentes
4th Time trial, French National Road Championships
5th Chrono des Nations
7th Classic Loire Atlantique
10th Overall Paris–Corrèze

=== Grand Tour general classification results timeline ===
Grand Tour	2002	2003	2004	2005	2006	2007
Giro d'Italia	—	—	—	—	—	84
Tour de France	62	108	—	119	—	—
Vuelta a España	—	—	DNF	—	76	DNF

Legend
DSQ	Disqualified
DNF	Did not finish
