= Serhiy Honchar =

Ukrainian cyclist (born 1970)

Serhiy Gonchar
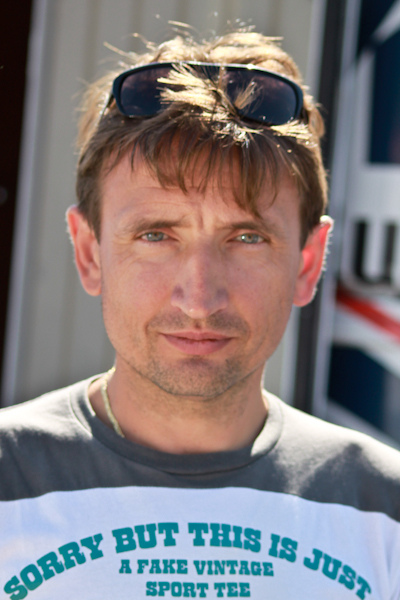
- Gonchar in 2011

Personal information
- Full name: Serhiy Gonchar
- Born: 3 July 1970 (age 56) Rivne, Ukrainian SSR, Soviet Union (now Ukraine)
- Height: 1.76 m (5 ft 9 in)
- Weight: 72 kg (159 lb; 11.3 st)

Cycling career
- Sport: Cycling
- Current team: Retired
- Discipline: Road
- Role: Rider
- Rider type: Time trialist

Professional teams
- 1996: Ideal–Aster Lichy
- 1997: Aki–Safi
- 1998: Cantina Tollo–Alexia Alluminio
- 1999: Vini Caldirola
- 2000–2001: Liquigas–Pata
- 2002: Fassa Bortolo
- 2003–2005: De Nardi–Colpack
- 2006–2007: T-Mobile Team
- 2008: Preti Mangimi
- 2009: Team Utensilnord

Major wins
- Grand Tours Tour de France 2 individual stages (2006) Giro d'Italia 5 individual stages (1997, 1998, 1999, 2003, 2004) One-day races and Classics World Time Trial Championships (2000) National Road Race Championships (2003) National Time Trial Championships (1996, 1998, 2000, 2001, 2002)
Medal record
Representing Ukraine
Men's road bicycle racing
World Championships
Gold medal – first place	2000 Plouay	Elite Men's Time Trial
Silver medal – second place	1997 San Sebastián	Elite Men's Time Trial
Bronze medal – third place	1998 Valkenburg	Elite Men's Time Trial

Serhiy Gonchar (Ukrainian: Сергій Гончар; born 3 July 1970) is a Ukrainian former professional road racing cyclist. He won the World Time Trial Championship in 2000. Due to a temporary spelling error in his passport, he is often incorrectly called Honchar.

== Career ==
Gonchar failed a blood health check in the 1999 Tour de Suisse, and was removed from the race. Even though it was only a health check, and not a doping offence, the Tour de France organisation still decided to ban his Vini Caldirola team from the 1999 Tour de France.

In the 2006 Tour de France, Gonchar lead the general classification after a time-trial win in stage 7. In time trialing, Gonchar rocks the top of his body to get the most out of a big gear. He beat Landis, Zabriskie, Lang, Rogers, Klöden, Evans and various others in the individual time trials in the 2006 Tour de France.

On 11 May 2007, Gonchar was suspended for 30 days by his T-Mobile team, following blood tests taken at Liège–Bastogne–Liège and the Tour de Romandie. On 19 June 2007, the T-Mobile team announced the termination of his contract.

When Gonchar was not able to find a new team in 2010, he retired.

== Major results ==
1993
1st Overall Okolo Slovenska
1997
1st Chrono des Herbiers
1st Stage 5 (ITT) Tour de Suisse
2nd Time trial, UCI Road World Championships
3rd Grand Prix Eddy Merckx
5th Overall Giro d'Italia

1st Stage 18 (ITT)

9th Gran Premio de Llodio
1998
1st Time trial, National Road Championships
1st Chrono des Herbiers
1st Stage 3b (ITT) Four Days of Dunkirk
3rd Time trial, UCI Road World Championships
7th Overall Ronde van Nederland

1st Stage 3b (ITT)

10th Overall Giro d'Italia

1st Stage 21 (ITT)
Held after Stages 3 & 4

1999
1st Overall Ronde van Nederland

1st Stage 3b (ITT)

1st Chrono des Herbiers
1st Grand Prix des Nations
6th Time trial, UCI Road World Championships
7th Overall Giro d'Italia

1st Stage 18 (ITT)

2000
1st Time trial, UCI Road World Championships
1st Time trial, National Road Championships
1st Overall Settimana Ciclistica Lombarda

1st Stage 2

2nd Chrono des Herbiers
4th GP Industria & Artigianato di Larciano
9th Time trial, Olympic Games
9th Overall Giro d'Italia
2001
1st Time trial, National Road Championships
1st Overall Settimana Ciclistica Lombarda

1st Stage 3

3rd Overall Ronde van Nederland

1st Stage 3b (ITT)

3rd Giro dell'Appennino
3rd Chrono des Herbiers
4th Overall Giro d'Italia
4th Giro della Romagna
4th EnBW Grand Prix (with Denis Zanette)
5th GP Industria & Artigianato di Larciano
8th Overall Giro del Trentino
10th Trofeo Pantalica
2002
1st Time trial, National Road Championships
3rd Overall Setmana Catalana de Ciclisme
10th Grand Prix Eddy Merckx (with Marco Velo)
2003
National Road Championships

1st Road race
2nd Time trial

3rd Overall Ronde van Nederland
3rd Grand Prix des Nations
4th Trofeo Melinda
4th Gran Premio Bruno Beghelli
4th Firenze–Pistoia
7th Overall Giro d'Italia

1st Stage 21 (ITT)

7th Giro di Lombardia
8th Overall Danmark Rundt
9th Overall Three Days of De Panne
2004
2nd Overall Giro d'Italia

1st Stage 13 (ITT)

3rd Time trial, National Road Championships
4th Trofeo Laigueglia
5th Veenendaal–Veenendaal
2005
1st Stage 3 Giro del Trentino
3rd Giro del Veneto
6th Overall Giro d'Italia
9th Coppa Placci
2006
Tour de France

1st Stages 7 (ITT) & 19 (ITT)
Held after Stages 7–9

2nd Overall Circuit de la Sarthe
4th LuK Challenge Chrono (with Michael Rogers)
Giro d'Italia

Held after Stages 5 & 7

2008
2nd Giro del Veneto
National Road Championships

4th Road race
4th Time trial

2009
4th Raiffeisen Grand Prix
10th Gran Premio Città di Camaiore

=== Grand Tour general classification results timeline ===
Grand Tour	1997	1998	1999	2000	2001	2002	2003	2004	2005	2006
Giro d'Italia	5	10	7	9	4	23	8	2	6	DNF
Tour de France	—	—	—	—	—	64	—	—	DNF	51
/ Vuelta a España	56	DNF	—	57	—	—	—	—	—	—

Legend
—	Did not compete
DNF	Did not finish

== See also ==
- List of doping cases in cycling
