= Pierre Roland =

Indonesian actor

Pierre Roland (born Pierre Roland Christy; 14 April 1979 in Bengkulu, Indonesia) is an Indonesian actor. He is known for his role as a super hero in a hit TV series Gerhana (RCTI, 1999-2002). He has appeared in films, television, music videos, advertisements, and as a television presenter.

He is also a film producer, having produced Angel's Cry for his production house, Pilot Project Production, about a Balinese girl who lost her mother in the first Bali Bombing. Roland has appeared in the Indonesian television series Mimpi Manis, alongside Dangdut singer Dewi Persik.

His parents are of mixed Indonesian and European ancestry: father is English/Indonesian (Bengkulu) while his mother is Dutch/Indonesian (Javanese/Manadonese). He has three children with his wife Bonita Adela.
