= Time trialist =

Type of road bicycle racer

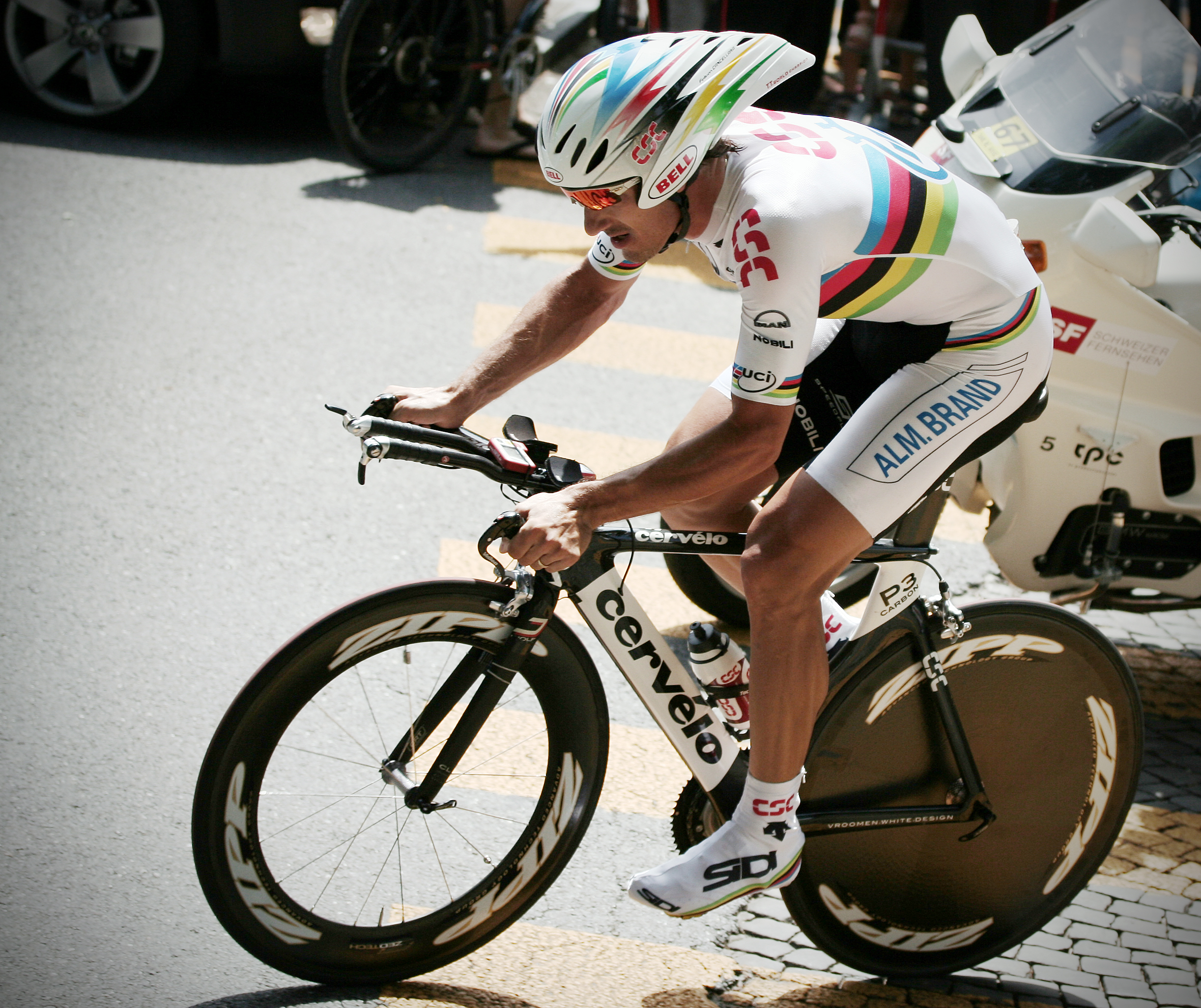
Fabian Cancellara riding a time-trial Cervelo bicycle with aerodynamic wheels and aero bars.

A time trialist is a road bicycle racer who can maintain high speeds for long periods of time, to maximize performance during individual or team time trials. The term cronoman, or chronoman, is also used to refer to a time trialist.

== Details ==
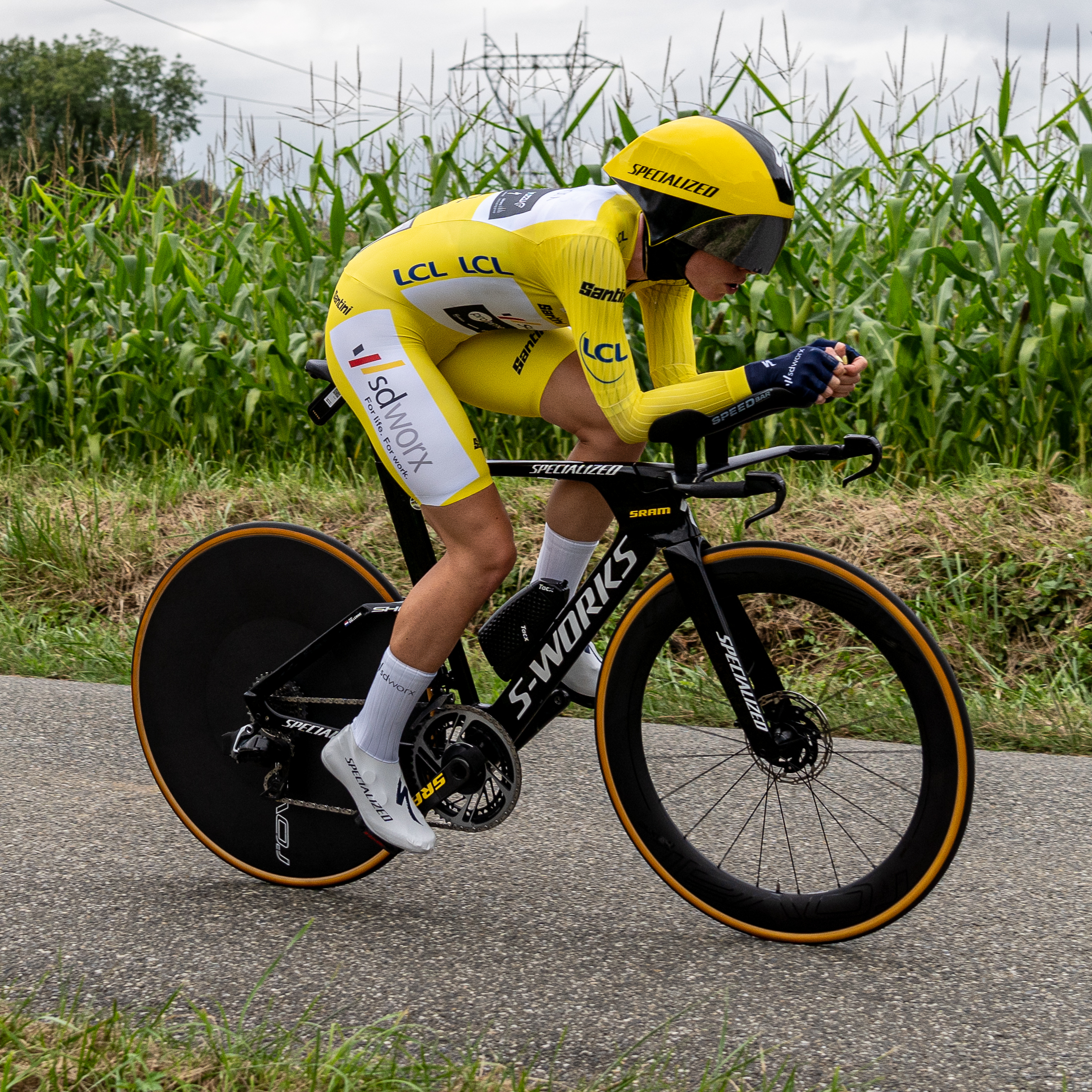
Demi Vollering wearing the yellow jersey during a time trial at the 2023 Tour de France Femmes

In a traditional individual time trial, riders set off alone (not in a group or peloton) at intervals, typically anything from one to five minutes, and try to complete the course in as short a time as possible. In order to maximize the overall speed a time trialist must be able to maintain a steady effort throughout the event, of which the best measure is believed to be the rider's power at lactate threshold (LT) or aerobic threshold (AT). The best time trialists (such as Miguel Indurain, David Millar, Ellen van Dijk, Tony Martin, Tom Dumoulin and Fabian Cancellara), are believed to have very high power output at LT/AT, which they can then maintain for the duration of the time trials.

To be a successful time trialist, a cyclist must have exceptional aerodynamic posture and be able to take in plenty of oxygen. Aerodynamic performance can also be improved by riders using 'skin suits', overshoes and streamlined helmets.

Bicycle performance is also important in time trials. By using aerodynamic components, a bicycle can be designed to minimize its drag coefficient, allowing a rider to drop their time by minutes during a long course.

Time trials may also form individual stages of stage races. By incorporating time trial specialists into a cycling team, the team can lower its aggregate time dramatically.

In relatively flat mass-start stages and races, time trialists often work as domestiques for their team leaders, or participate in breakaways. Some riders who are primarily time-trialists have also been able to compete in everything but the steepest climbs because of their good power-to-weight ratio. Tour de France winners Miguel Indurain, Jan Ullrich and Bradley Wiggins were primarily time-trialists but were also among the best in the mountain stages during the years in which they won the Tour de France. Likewise, Tom Dumoulin was able to win the 2017 Giro d'Italia by defending the lead he had built in the individual time trial in subsequent mountain stages.

== Famous time trialists ==
Men

- (France) Jacques Anquetil
- (France) Maurice Archambaud
- (United States) Lance Armstrong
- (United Kingdom) Chris Boardman
- (Belgium) Victor Campenaerts
- (Switzerland) Fabian Cancellara
- (France) Sylvain Chavanel
- (Australia) Rohan Dennis
- (United Kingdom) Alex Dowsett
- (Netherlands) Tom Dumoulin
- (Russia) Viatcheslav Ekimov
- (United Kingdom) Chris Froome
- (Italy) Filippo Ganna
- (Switzerland) Daniel Gisiger
- (France) Bernard Hinault
- (Ukraine) Serhiy Honchar
- (Spain) Miguel Indurain
- (Belarus) Vasil Kiryienka
- (Norway) Knut Knudsen
- (United States) Greg LeMond
- (France) Thierry Marie
- (Germany) Tony Martin
- (Belgium) Eddy Merckx
- (United Kingdom) David Millar
- (Italy) Francesco Moser
- (Spain) Abraham Olano
- (Poland) Lech Piasecki
- (Slovenia) Tadej Pogačar
- (Denmark) Ole Ritter
- (Australia) Michael Rogers
- (Slovenia) Primož Roglič
- (Switzerland) Tony Rominger
- (United Kingdom) Geraint Thomas
- (West Germany) Didi Thurau
- (Germany) Jan Ullrich
- (Belgium) Wout Van Aert
- (Belgium) Remco Evenepoel
- (Belgium) Herman Van Springel
- (United Kingdom) Bradley Wiggins
- (United States) David Zabriskie

Women

- (Austria) Anna Kiesenhofer
- (United States) Kristin Armstrong
- (Germany) Lisa Brennauer
- (United Kingdom) Beryl Burton
- (United States) Chloé Dygert
- (Netherlands) Leontien van Moorsel
- (Netherlands) Ellen van Dijk
- (Netherlands) Annemiek van Vleuten
- (Netherlands) Anna van der Breggen
- (France) Jeannie Longo
- (United Kingdom) Hayley Simmonds

== See also ==
- UCI Road World Championships – Men's time trial
- UCI Road World Championships – Women's time trial
