= Pascal Lance =

French cyclist

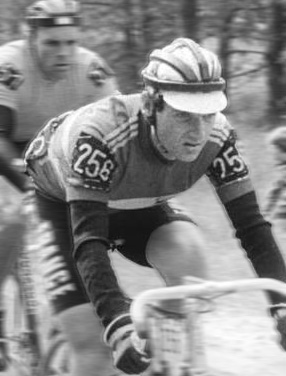
- Pascal Lance in 1987

Personal information
- Born: 23 January 1964 (age 62) Toulon, France
- Height: 1.78 m (5 ft 10 in)
- Weight: 63 kg (139 lb; 9 st 13 lb)

Sport
- Sport: Cycling
- Club: ASPTT Nancy

Pascal Lance (born 23 January 1964) is a retired French cyclist. He competed at the 1988 Summer Olympics in the 100 km team time trial and finished in fourth place.

He won the one-day race Chrono des Nations (1987, 1988, 1994 and 1995) and the multistage races Circuit de Lorraine (1985 and 1988) and Tour du Poitou-Charentes (1992). In the Duo Normand two-man team time trial he finished second in 1993 and third in 1996 and 1997.
