= Grand Prix des Nations =

Cycling competition

Race details
- Date: September
- Region: France
- English name: Grand Prix of the Nations
- Local name: Grand Prix des Nations (in French)
- Discipline: Road
- Type: Individual time-trial

History
- First edition: 1932
- Editions: 70
- Final edition: 2004
- First winner: (France) Maurice Archambaud
- Most wins: (France) Jacques Anquetil ( 9 wins)
- Final winner: (Germany) Michael Rich

The Grand Prix des Nations was an individual time trial (against the clock) for both professional and amateur racing cyclists. Held annually in Cannes, France, it was instituted in 1932 and often regarded as the unofficial time trial championship of the world and as a Classic cycle race. The race was the idea of a Parisian newspaper editor called Gaston Bénac. The beret-wearing sports editor was looking for a race to make a name for Paris-Soir, the biggest French evening paper before the war.

He and his colleague Albert Baker d'Isy had been inspired by the world road race championship in Copenhagen, Denmark, in 1931. That, unusually, had been run as a time trial, and the two were impressed and also, they said, aware that a time-trial cost less to organise than a conventional road race. Baker d'Isy decided the name Grand Prix des Nations.

There is a dispute over who devised the first route. The American-French writer René de Latour said in the UK magazine Sporting Cyclist that he did; Baker d'Isy says that he did. The route started near the Versailles château and ran round a triangle through Rambouillet, Maulette, Saint-Rémy-les-Chevreuse, Versailles and Boulogne to finish on the Vélodrome Buffalo where the founder of the Tour de France, Henri Desgrange, had become the world's first hour record holder in 1893. There were three hills, one in the first 100 km, plenty of cobbles, and the last 40 km went through the woods of the Vallée de Chevreuse, a popular area for bike riders. The distance was 142 km.

The introduction of an official time trial champion at the UCI Road World Championships in 1994 and an Olympic individual time trial championship (1996) reduced its importance. With the introduction of the UCI ProTour in 2005, the event was removed from the calendar. Since 2006, Chrono des Nations (formerly Chrono des Herbiers) has effectively taken the place of GP des Nations in the calendar.

== History ==
Race distances have varied. Until 1955, it was approximately 140 km; six years later, the distance was 100 km; from 1965 onwards the distance rarely exceeded 90 km, with many events run of around 75 km. The events were in the Vallée de Chevreuse in the Paris area, then near Cannes on the French Riviera; for five years from 1993, it was held at the Madine Lake in the Meuse; from 1998, it has taken place in Seine-Maritime département, two circuits of 35 km around Dieppe.

The roll of honour includes cycling's greatest time trialists, but the event's history was dominated by two Frenchmen: Jacques Anquetil won nine times, Bernard Hinault five.

British amateur woman Beryl Burton competed in 1968, finishing only minutes behind her male rivals.

== Winners (professionals) ==
Year	Country	Rider	Team
1932	France	Maurice Archambaud	
1933	France	Raymond Louviot	
1934	France	Antonin Magne	
1935	France	Antonin Magne	
1936	France	Antonin Magne	
1937	France	Pierre Cogan	
1938	France	Louis Aimar	
1941	Italy	Jules Rossi (victory shared with Louis Aimar)	
1941	France	Louis Aimar (victory shared with Jules Rossi)	
1942	France	Jean-Marie Goasmat (victory shared with Émile Idée)	
1942	France	Émile Idée (victory shared with Jean-Marie Goasmat)	
1943	Belgium	Jozef Somers	
1944	France	Émile Carrara	
1945	France	Eloi Tassin	
1946	Italy	Fausto Coppi	
1947	Italy	Fausto Coppi	
1948	France	René Berton	
1949	France	Charles Coste	
1950	Belgium	Maurice Blomme	
1951	Switzerland	Hugo Koblet	
1952	France	Louison Bobet	Stella Huret Dunlop
1953	France	Jacques Anquetil	La Française–Dunlop
1954	France	Jacques Anquetil	La Perle–Hutchinson
1955	France	Jacques Anquetil	La Perle Hutchinson
1956	France	Jacques Anquetil	Helyett Potin
1957	France	Jacques Anquetil	Helyett Potin
1958	France	Jacques Anquetil	Helyett Potin
1959	Italy	Aldo Moser	EMI Guerra
1960	Italy	Ercole Baldini	Ignis
1961	France	Jacques Anquetil	Helyett Fynsec
1962	Belgium	Ferdinand Bracke	Peugeot
1963	France	Raymond Poulidor	Mercier–BP
1964	Belgium	Walter Boucquet	Flandria–Faema
1965	France	Jacques Anquetil	Ford–Gitane
1966	France	Jacques Anquetil	Ford-Hutchinson
1967	Italy	Felice Gimondi	Salvarani
1968	Italy	Felice Gimondi	Salvarani
1969	Belgium	Herman van Springel	Mann–Grundig
1970	Belgium	Herman van Springel	Mann–Grundig
1971	Spain	Luis Ocaña	Bic
1972	Belgium	Roger Swerts	Molteni
1973	Belgium	Eddy Merckx	Molteni
1974	Netherlands	Roy Schuiten	TI–Raleigh
1975	Netherlands	Roy Schuiten	TI–Raleigh
1976	Belgium	Freddy Maertens	Flandria Velda
1977	France	Bernard Hinault	Gitane–Campagnolo
1978	France	Bernard Hinault	Renault–Elf–Gitane
1979	France	Bernard Hinault	Renault–Elf–Gitane
1980	Belgium	Jean-Luc Vandenbroucke	La Redoute–Motobécane
1981	Switzerland	Daniel Gisiger	Cilo–Aufina
1982	France	Bernard Hinault	Renault–Elf
1983	Switzerland	Daniel Gisiger	Malvor Bottecchia
1984	France	Bernard Hinault	La Vie Claire
1985	France	Charly Mottet	Renault–Elf–Gitane
1986	Ireland	Sean Kelly	Kas
1987	France	Charly Mottet	Système U–Gitane
1988	France	Charly Mottet	Système U–Gitane
1989	France	Laurent Fignon	Super U–Raleigh–Fiat
1990	Switzerland	Thomas Wegmüller	Weinn SMM
1991	Switzerland	Tony Rominger	Toshiba
1992	Belgium	Johan Bruyneel	ONCE
1993	France	Armand de Las Cuevas	Banesto–Pinarello
1994	Switzerland	Tony Rominger	Mapei–CLAS
1995	No race		
1996	Great Britain	Chris Boardman	GAN
1997	Germany	Uwe Peschel	Cantina Tollo–Carrier–Starplast
1998	France	Francisque Teyssier	Mutuelle de Seine-et-Marne
1999	Ukraine	Serhiy Honchar	Vini Caldirola
2000	Result Void		
2001	Germany	Jens Voigt	Crédit Agricole
2002	Germany	Uwe Peschel	Gerolsteiner
2003	Germany	Michael Rich	Gerolsteiner
2004	Germany	Michael Rich	Gerolsteiner
