= Tour Poitou-Charentes en Nouvelle-Aquitaine =

French multi-day road cycling race

Race details
- Date: Early-August
- Region: Nouvelle-Aquitaine, France
- English name: Tour of Poitou-Charentes in Nouvelle-Aquitaine
- Local name: Tour Poitou-Charentes en Nouvelle-Aquitaine
- Discipline: Road
- Competition: UCI Europe Tour
- Type: Stage-race
- Web site: www.tour-poitou-charentes.com

History
- First edition: 1987
- Editions: 40 (as of 2026)
- First winner: Jean-Louis Conan (FRA)
- Most wins: Sylvain Chavanel (FRA) (4 wins)
- Most recent: Maxime Decomble (FRA)

Tour Poitou-Charentes en Nouvelle-Aquitaine is a road bicycle race held annually in the former region of Poitou-Charentes (now Nouvelle-Aquitaine) France. It was first held in 1987 and since 2005 it has been organised as a 2.1 event on the UCI Europe Tour.

== Winners ==
Year	Country	Rider	Team
1987	France	Jean-Louis Conan	
1988	France	Pascal Peyramaure	
1989	Soviet Union	Pavel Tonkov	
1990	Soviet Union	Yuri Manouylov	
1991	Denmark	Kim Andersen	Z-Peugeot
1992	France	Pascal Lance	Z
1993	France	Thierry Marie	Festina–Lotus
1994	France	Philippe Gaumont	Castorama
1995	France	Nicolas Aubier	GAN
1996	France	Eddy Seigneur	GAN
1997	Portugal	Joaquim Andrade	Maia-Jumbo-Cin
1998	Estonia	Lauri Aus	Casino–Ag2r
1999	France	Christophe Moreau	Festina–Lotus
2000	United States	Floyd Landis	Mercury Cycling Team
2001	Germany	Jens Voigt	Crédit Agricole
2002	Italy	Guido Trentin	Cofidis
2003	Germany	Jens Voigt	Crédit Agricole
2004	France	Stéphane Barthe	Oktos-Saint Quentin
2005	France	Sylvain Chavanel	Cofidis
2006	France	Sylvain Chavanel	Cofidis
2007	France	Thomas Voeckler	Bouygues Télécom
2008	France	Benoît Vaugrenard	Française des Jeux
2009	Sweden	Gustav Larsson	Team Saxo Bank
2010	France	Jimmy Engoulvent	Saur–Sojasun
2011	New Zealand	Jesse Sergent	Team RadioShack
2012	Australia	Luke Durbridge	Orica–GreenEDGE
2013	France	Thomas Voeckler	Team Europcar
2014	France	Sylvain Chavanel	IAM Cycling
2015	Germany	Tony Martin	Etixx–Quick-Step
2016	France	Sylvain Chavanel	Direct Énergie
2017	Denmark	Mads Pedersen	Trek–Segafredo
2018	France	Arnaud Démare	Groupama–FDJ
2019	France	Christophe Laporte	Cofidis
2020	France	Arnaud Démare	Groupama–FDJ
2021	Great Britain	Connor Swift	Arkéa–Samsic
2022	Switzerland	Stefan Küng	Groupama–FDJ
2023	Norway	Søren Wærenskjold	Uno-X Pro Cycling Team
2024	Norway	Søren Wærenskjold	Uno-X Mobility
2025	France	Samuel Leroux	Team TotalEnergies
2026	France	Maxime Decomble	Groupama–FDJ United
