= Les Herbiers =

- Commune
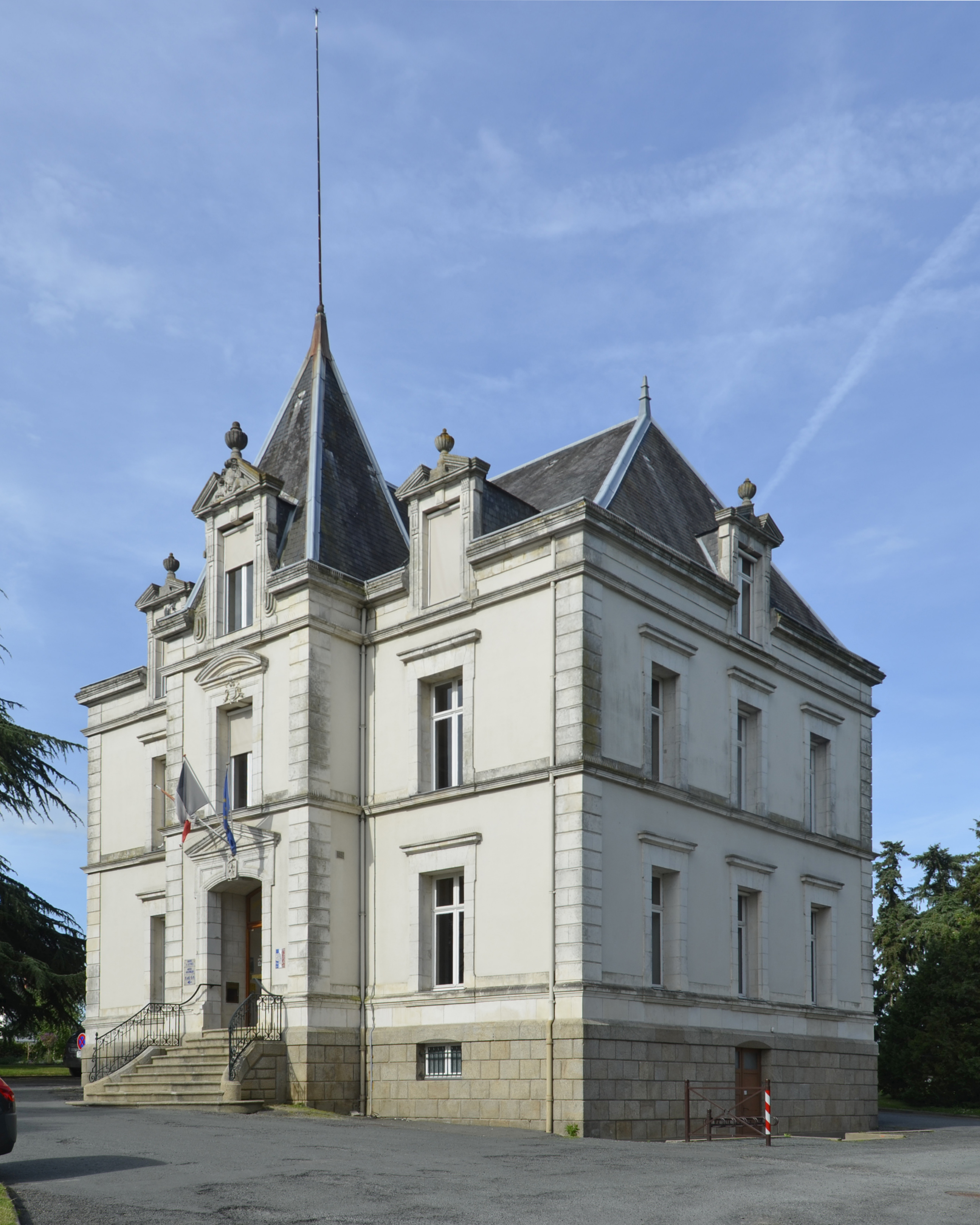
- The town hall in Les Herbiers

- Coat of arms
- Location of Les Herbiers
- Location within France Location within Pays de la Loire
- Coordinates: 46°52′N 1°01′W
- Country: France
- Region: Pays de la Loire
- Department: Vendée
- Arrondissement: La Roche-sur-Yon
- Canton: Les Herbiers
- Intercommunality: Pays des Herbiers

Government
  - Mayor (2022–2026): Christophe Hogard
- Area^{1}: 88.78 km^{2} (34.28 sq mi)
- Highest elevation: 245 m (804 ft)
- Lowest elevation: 69 m (226 ft)
- Population (2023): 16,521
  - Density: 186.1/km^{2} (482.0/sq mi)
- Time zone: UTC+01:00 (CET)
  - Summer (DST): UTC+02:00 (CEST)
- INSEE/Postal code: 85109 /85500
- Website: www.lesherbiers.fr
- ^{1} French Land Register data, which excludes lakes, ponds, glaciers > 1 km^{2} (0.386 sq mi or 247 acres) and river estuaries.

Les Herbiers (French pronunciation: [lez‿ɛʁbje]) is a commune in the Vendée department in the Pays de la Loire region, western France.

== Population ==
Historical population
Year	Pop.	±% p.a.
1968	9,050	—
1975	10,599	+2.28%
1982	12,049	+1.85%
1990	13,413	+1.35%
1999	13,932	+0.42%
2007	14,893	+0.84%
2012	15,688	+1.05%
2017	15,958	+0.34%
2023	16,521	+0.58%
Source: INSEE

== Sport ==
Les Herbiers is host to the Chrono des Nations, an annual one-day individual time trial bicycle race, held in October. Les Herbiers VF is based in the commune.

== Twin towns ==
Les Herbiers is twinned with:

- Newtown, United Kingdom

== Notable people ==
- Guy Chevalier (born 1938), French clergyman and bishop

== See also ==
- Communes of the Vendée department
