= List of wins by Vlaanderen 2002 and its successors =

This is a comprehensive list of victories of the Team Flanders–Baloise cycling team. The races are categorized according to the UCI Continental Circuits rules. The team participates in UCI Continental Circuits races and when selected as a wildcard to UCI World Tour events.

== 1995 Vlaanderen 2002 ==
Stage 4 Tour of the Netherlands, Tom Steels
Nationale Sluitingsprijs, Tom Steels
Grote 1-MeiPrijs, Tom Steels
GP van Steenbergen, Tom Steels

== 1996 Vlaanderen 2002 ==
Schaal Sels, Glenn D'Hollander
Grand Prix d'Isbergues, Mario Aerts
Stage 9 Tour of Austria, Luc Roosen
Stage 10 Tour of Austria, Glenn D'Hollander

== 1997 Vlaanderen 2002 ==
Overall Circuit Franco-Belge, Mario Aerts

Stage 1, Geert Van Bondt
Stage 3, Kris Gerits

Overall Circuito Montañés, Kurt Van De Wouwer

Stage 1, Erwin Thijs

== 1998 Vlaanderen 2002 ==
Eurode Omloop, Glenn D'Hollander
Stage 3 Circuit Franco-Belge, Kris Gerits
Zellik–Galmaarden, Kris Gerits
Flèche Ardennaise, Kris Gerits
Stage 4 Tour of the Netherlands, Peter Wuyts
Stage 1 Tour de l'Avenir, Leif Hoste
Stage 2 Tour de l'Avenir, Peter Wuyts

== 1999 Vlaanderen 2002 ==
Stage 5 Circuit des Mines, Wilfried Cretskens
Stage 6b Circuit des Mines, Stive Vermaut
Stage 1 Circuito Montañés, Glenn D'Hollander
Stage 4b Circuito Montañés, Team time trial
Stage 3a Bayern Rundfahrt, Kris Gerits
Eurode Omloop, Kris Gerits
Flèche Namuroise-Bioul, Wilfried Cretskens

== 2000 Vlaanderen 2002 ==
Stages 2 & 3 Ster der Beloften, Erwin Thijs
Ronde van Limburg, Erwin Thijs
Stage 2 Dekra Open Stuttgart, Björn Leukemans
Stage 3 Dekra Open Stuttgart, Erwin Thijs

== 2001 Vlaanderen–T-Interim ==
Le Samyn, Kris Gerits
Stage 3 Tour de la Somme, Nico Sijmens

== 2002 Vlaanderen–T-Interim ==
Stage 2 Circuito Montañés, Geoffrey Demeyere

== 2003 Vlaanderen–T-Interim ==
Hel van het Mergelland, Wim Van Huffel
Stage 6b Circuit des Mines, Wouter Van Mechelen
Stages 4 & 6 Tour of Austria, Nico Sijmens
Overall Circuito Montañés, Steven Kleynen

Stage 3, Nico Sijmens

Stage 2 Tour of China, Nico Sijmens

== 2004 Vlaanderen–T-Interim ==
Grand Prix de la Ville de Lillers, Benny De Schrooder
Stages 1 & 3 Vuelta a La Rioja, Jan Kuyckx
Stage 9 Circuit des Mines, Wouter Van Mechelen
Stage 6 Tour of Austria, Jan Kuyckx
Stage 5a Circuito Montañés, Wesley Van der Linden
Brussel–Ingooigem, Steven Caethoven
Stage 4 Regio-Tour, Steven Caethoven
Schaal Sels, Geoffrey Demeyere
Stage 3 Tour de l'Avenir, Steven Caethoven
Stage 3 Tour de la Somme, Wouter Van Mechelen

== 2005 Chocolade Jacques–T-Interim ==
Grand Prix Rudy Dhaenens, Koen Barbé
Dwars door Vlaanderen, Niko Eeckhout
Stage 2 Three Days of De Panne, Niko Eeckhout
Stage 4a Rheinland-Pfalz Rundfahrt, Pieter Mertens
Stage 1 Sachsen Tour, Steven Caethoven
Grand Prix d'Isbergues, Niko Eeckhout
Omloop van het Houtland, Kevin van Impe
Omloop van de Vlaamse Scheldeboorden, Niko Eeckhout
Stage 1 Circuit Franco-Belge, Niko Eeckhout

== 2006 Chocolade Jacques–Topsport Vlaanderen ==
Overall Étoile de Bessèges, Frederik Willems
Stage 1, Frederik Willems
Beverbeek Classic, Evert Verbist
De Vlaamse Pijl, Evert Verbist
Overall Driedaagse van West-Vlaanderen, Niko Eeckhout

Stage 3, Niko Eeckhout

Omloop van het Waasland, Niko Eeckhout
Dwars door Vlaanderen, Frederik Veuchelen
Stage 5 Rheinland-Pfalz Rundfahrt, Steven Caethoven
Stage 3 Ster Elektrotoer, Frederik Willems
Belgium Road Race Championships, Niko Eeckhout
Stage 4 Tour of Austria, Pieter Ghyllebert
Stage 4 Tour of Britain, Frederik Willems
Memorial Rik Van Steenbergen, Niko Eeckhout
Kampioenschap van Vlaanderen, Niko Eeckhout
Stage 3 Circuit Franco-Belge, Niko Eeckhout

== 2007 Chocolade Jacques–Topsport Vlaanderen ==
Stage 2 Tour Down Under, Steven Caethoven
Stage 4 Tour Down Under, Pieter Ghyllebert
De Vlaamse Pijl, Jelle Vanendert
Omloop van het Waasland, Niko Eeckhout
Internatie Reningelst, Iljo Keisse
Schaal Sels, Kenny Dehaes

== 2008 Topsport Vlaanderen ==
Beverbeek Classic, Johan Coenen
Omloop van het Waasland, Niko Eeckhout
Stage 3 Four Days of Dunkirk, Kenny Dehaes
Stage 1 Tour of Belgium, Kenny Dehaes

== 2009 Topsport Vlaanderen–Mercator ==
Omloop van het Waasland, Johan Coenen
Internationale Wielertrofee Jong Maar Moedig, Thomas De Gendt
Stage 4 Tour de Wallonie, Thomas De Gendt
Stage 3 Vuelta a Burgos, Nikolas Maes

== 2010 Topsport Vlaanderen–Mercator ==
Stage 2 Tour of Qatar, Geert Steurs
Stage 3 Driedaagse van West-Vlaanderen, Kris Boeckmans
Grand Prix of Aargau Canton, Kristof Vandewalle
Stage 5 Ster Elektrotoer, Kris Boeckmans
Stage 2 Danmark Rundt, Michael Van Staeyen
Memorial Rik Van Steenbergen, Michael Van Staeyen

== 2011 Topsport Vlaanderen–Mercator ==
Sparkassen Giro Bochum, Pieter Vanspeybrouck

== 2012 Topsport Vlaanderen–Mercator ==
Beverbeek Classic, Tom Van Asbroeck
Omloop van het Waasland, Preben Van Hecke
Internationale Wielertrofee Jong Maar Moedig, Tim Declercq
Grote Prijs Stad Geel, Tom Van Asbroeck

== 2013 Topsport Vlaanderen–Baloise ==
Stage 1 Étoile de Bessèges, Michael Van Staeyen
Omloop van het Waasland, Pieter Jacobs
Internationale Wielertrofee Jong Maar Moedig, Tim Declercq
Grote Prijs Stad Geel, Yves Lampaert
Antwerpse Havenpijl, Preben Van Hecke
Stage 1 World Ports Classic, Jelle Wallays
Schaal Sels, Pieter Jacobs
Grand Prix de la Somme, Preben Van Hecke

== 2014 Topsport Vlaanderen–Baloise ==
Paris–Tours, Jelle Wallays
Grand Prix d'Ouverture La Marseillaise, Kenneth Vanbilsen
Stage 1 Étoile de Bessèges, Sander Helven
Cholet-Pays de Loire, Tom Van Asbroeck
Stage 2 Boucles de la Mayenne, Eliot Lietaer
Stage 4 Tour de Wallonie, Tom Van Asbroeck
Internationale Wielertrofee Jong Maar Moedig, Gijs Van Hoecke
Grote Prijs Stad Zottegem, Edward Theuns
Arnhem–Veenendaal Classic, Yves Lampaert
De Kustpijl, Michael Van Staeyen
Omloop van het Houtland, Jelle Wallays

== 2015 Topsport Vlaanderen–Baloise ==
Dwars door Vlaanderen, Jelle Wallays
Ronde van Drenthe, Edward Theuns
Stage 5 Four Days of Dunkirk, Edward Theuns
Grand Prix Criquielion, Jelle Wallays
Belgium Road Race Championships, Preben Van Hecke
Dwars door de Vlaamse Ardennen, Stijn Steels
Polynormande, Oliver Naesen
Gooikse Pijl, Oliver Naesen
Duo Normand, Victor Campenaerts & Jelle Wallays
Stage 3 Tour de l'Eurométropole, Edward Theuns

== 2016 Topsport Vlaanderen–Baloise ==
Grand Prix de la Ville de Lillers, Stijn Steels

== 2017 Sport Vlaanderen–Baloise ==
Stage 1 Tour des Fjords, Dries Van Gestel
De Kustpijl, Christophe Noppe
Grote Prijs Marcel Kint, Jonas Rickaert

== 2018 Sport Vlaanderen–Baloise ==
Stage 8 Rás Tailteann, Robbe Ghys

== 2019 Sport Vlaanderen–Baloise ==
Tour de l'Eurométropole, Piet Allegaert

== 2020 Sport Vlaanderen–Baloise ==
Heistse Pijl, Sasha Weemaes

== 2021 Sport Vlaanderen–Baloise ==
Stage 1 Tour of Belgium, Robbe Ghys
Grand Prix du Morbihan, Arne Marit
Ronde van Drenthe, Rune Herregodts

== 2022 Sport Vlaanderen–Baloise ==
Stage 1 Vuelta a Andalucía, Rune Herregodts
Stage 1 Sazka Tour, Rune Herregodts
Stage 3 Sazka Tour, Kamiel Bonneu
Stage 3 Tour of Britain, Kamiel Bonneu

== 2023 Team Flanders–Baloise ==
SD WORX BW Classic, Milan Fretin

== 2024 Team Flanders–Baloise ==
Stage 3 Arctic Race of Norway, Kamiel Bonneu

== 2026 Team Flanders–Baloise ==
1st Grand Prix de la Ville de Lillers, Jules Hesters
Tour of Turkiye

1st Points classification, Tom Crabbe
1st Stages 1, 2 & 8, Tom Crabbe

== Supplementary statistics ==
=== 1994 to 2014 ===
Grand Tours by highest finishing position
Race	1994	1995	1996	1997	1998	1999	2000	2001	2002	2003	2004	2005	2006	2007	2008	2009	2010	2011	2012	2013	2014
Giro d'Italia	–	–	–	–	–	–	–	–	–	–	–	–	–	–	–	–	–	–	–	–	–
Tour de France	–	–	–	–	–	–	–	–	–	–	–	–	–	–	–	–	–	–	–	–	–
Vuelta a España	–	–	–	–	–	–	–	–	–	–	–	–	–	–	–	–	–	–	–	–	–
Major week-long stage races by highest finishing position
Race	1994	1995	1996	1997	1998	1999	2000	2001	2002	2003	2004	2005	2006	2007	2008	2009	2010	2011	2012	2013	2014
Tour Down Under	Did not Exist					–	–	–	–	–	–	–	10	17	–	–	–	–	–	–	–
Paris–Nice	–	–	–	–	–	–	–	–	–	–	–	–	–	–	–	–	–	–	–	–	–
Tirreno–Adriatico	–	78	–	–	–	–	–	–	–	–	–	–	–	–	–	–	–	–	–	–	–
Volta a Catalunya	–	–	–	–	–	–	–	–	–	–	–	–	–	–	–	–	–	–	–	–	–
Tour of the Basque Country	–	–	–	–	–	–	–	–	–	–	–	–	–	–	–	–	–	–	–	–	–
Tour de Romandie	–	–	–	–	–	–	–	–	–	–	–	–	–	–	–	–	–	–	–	–	–
Critérium du Dauphiné	–	–	–	–	–	–	–	–	–	–	–	–	–	–	–	–	–	–	–	–	–
Tour de Suisse	13	33	–	–	–	–	–	–	–	–	–	–	–	–	–	–	–	–	–	–	–
Tour de Pologne	–	–	–	–	–	–	–	–	–	–	–	–	–	–	–	–	–	–	–	–	–
Eneco Tour	21	36	25	26	12	17	–	–	–	–	–	19	34	39	–	9	21	7	42	17	21
Monument races by highest finishing position
Race	1994	1995	1996	1997	1998	1999	2000	2001	2002	2003	2004	2005	2006	2007	2008	2009	2010	2011	2012	2013	2014
Milan–San Remo	–	–	–	–	–	–	–	–	–	–	–	–	–	–	–	–	–	–	–	–	–
Tour of Flanders	58	48	55	54	–	–	56	56	63	91	63	88	48	69	27	25	61	73	51	64	35
Paris–Roubaix	–	–	–	–	–	–	–	–	–	–	–	–	–	–	–	42	–	–	–	–	68
Liège–Bastogne–Liège	–	–	–	32	–	57	–	–	–	–	–	41	91	26	46	DNF	21	35	30	127	73
Giro di Lombardia	–	–	–	–	–	–	–	–	–	–	–	–	–	–	–	–	–	–	–	–	–
Classics by highest finishing position
Classic	1994	1995	1996	1997	1998	1999	2000	2001	2002	2003	2004	2005	2006	2007	2008	2009	2010	2011	2012	2013	2014
Omloop Het Nieuwsblad	47	28	21	31	59	32	48	60	15	45	NH	4	4	13	25	25	88	48	19	3	15
Kuurne–Brussels–Kuurne	18	5	17	18	8	30	7	11	26	DNF	63	1	4	3	25	32	DNF	14	23	NH	4
Strade Bianche	Did not Exist													–	–	–	–	–	–	–	–
E3 Harelbeke	11	32	47	7	20	57	24	OTL	59	3	30	23	48	34	15	19	15	20	20	43	27
Gent–Wevelgem	55	3	24	36	109	72	25	–	DNF	–	DNF	60	28	87	5	20	2	53	29	DNF	6
Amstel Gold Race	–	33	73	–	–	–	–	–	–	–	44	19	95	54	67	36	34	33	43	58	53
La Flèche Wallonne	–	61	90	30	57	32	97	–	64	83	50	92	101	13	54	14	35	26	37	102	28
Clásica de San Sebastián	–	–	–	–	–	–	–	–	–	–	–	–	–	–	–	–	–	–	–	–	–
Paris–Tours	–	19	92	77	71	50	–	–	–	–	–	–	52	17	9	–	4	29	2	5	1

=== 2015 to present ===
Grand Tours by highest finishing position
Race	2015	2016	2017	2018	2019	2020	2021	2022	2023
Giro d'Italia	–	–	–	–	–	–	–	–	–
Tour de France	–	–	–	–	–	–	–	–	–
Vuelta a España	–	–	–	–	–	–	–	–	–
Major week-long stage races by highest finishing position
Race	2015	2016	2017	2018	2019	2020	2021	2022	2023
Tour Down Under	–	–	–	–	–	–	NH		–
Paris–Nice	–	–	–	–	–	–	–	–	–
Tirreno–Adriatico	–	–	–	–	–	–	–	–	–
Volta a Catalunya	–	–	–	–	–	NH	–	–	–
Tour of the Basque Country	–	–	–	–	–	NH	–	–	–
Tour de Romandie	–	–	–	–	–	NH	–	–	–
Critérium du Dauphiné	–	–	–	–	–	–	–	–	–
Tour de Suisse	–	–	–	–	–	NH	–	–	–
Tour de Pologne	–	–	–	–	–	–	–	–	–
BinckBank Tour	20	38	44	38	30	28	25	NH (Note: The Organisers cancelled the 2022 edition due to an "overcrowded" calendar.)	58
Monuments by highest finishing position
Monument	2015	2016	2017	2018	2019	2020	2021	2022	2023
Milan–San Remo	–	–	–	–	–	–	–	–	–
Tour of Flanders	35	30	44	47	13	22	47	45	59
Paris–Roubaix	41	21	17	–	–	NH	–	33	81
Liège–Bastogne–Liège	72	40	75	76	62	54	93	90	102
Il Lombardia	–	–	–	–	–	–	–	–	–
Classics by highest finishing position
Classic	2015	2016	2017	2018	2019	2020	2021	2022	2023
Omloop Het Nieuwsblad	14	43	39	15	32	29	17	46	86
Kuurne–Brussels–Kuurne	11	18	37	85	19	28	47	31	26
Strade Bianche	–	–	–	–	–	–	–	–	–
E3 Harelbeke	41	42	50	36	31	NH	40	40	63
Gent–Wevelgem	11	13	12	27	36	23	63	15	50
Amstel Gold Race	43	21	58	12	41	NH	80	37	43
La Flèche Wallonne	43	23	41	58	32	54	95	27	–
Clásica de San Sebastián	–	–	–	–	–	NH	–	–	–
Paris–Tours	8	26	25	36	5	15	7	–	–

Legend
—	Did not compete
DNF	Did not finish
NH	Not held
