= Tour de Namur =

Cycling race

Race details
- Date: July
- Region: Namur Province
- English name: Tour of the Province of Namur
- Local name: Ronde van Namen (Dutch)
- Discipline: Road
- Competition: National event (NE)
- Type: Stage race
- Organiser: Royal Namur Vélo

History
- First edition: 1948
- Editions: 77 (as of 2025)
- First winner: Roger Wilmot (BEL); Edmond De Backer (BEL)
- Most wins: Jos De Schoenmaecker (BEL) (2 wins)
- Most recent: Victor Van de Putte (BEL)

The Tour de la province de Namur (English: Tour of the Province of Namur is a cycling race held annually in the Liège province of Belgium.

== Winners ==
| Year | Winner | Second | Third |
|---|---|---|---|
| 1948 | (Belgium) Roger Wilmot and (Belgium) Edmond De Backer | | (Belgium) Jean Borcy |
| 1949 | (Belgium) Ernest Albert | (Belgium) Richard Van Genechten | (Belgium) Léon Vandenberghe |
| 1950 | (Belgium) Désiré De Proot | (Belgium) Marcel Trefois | (Belgium) Ernest De Backer |
| 1951 | (Belgium) Robert Grondelaers | (Belgium) Lucien Victor | (Belgium) Marcel Trefois |
| 1952 | (Belgium) Karel Clerckx | (Belgium) Paul Depaepe and (Belgium) Jean Moxhet | |
| 1953 | (Belgium) François Jennes | (Belgium) Cyrille Vandorpe | (Belgium) Edgard Vandercasseyen |
| 1954 | (Belgium) Jules Mans | (Belgium) Marcel Trefois | (Belgium) Flory Ongenae |
| 1955 | (Belgium) Marcel Trefois | (Belgium) Jean-Baptiste Blavier | (Belgium) Vital Lavis |
| 1956 | (Belgium) Roger Soenen | (Belgium) Gilbert Viscardy | (Belgium) Valère Paulissen |
| 1957 | (Belgium) Henri De Wolf | (Netherlands) Jacques Vranken | (Poland) Thadeus Wierucki |
| 1958 | (Belgium) Marcel Blavier | (Belgium) Jean-Marie Van Lippevelde | (Belgium) Robert Duveau |
| 1959 | (Belgium) Désiré Cartigny | (Belgium) Louis Geris | (Belgium) Roger Walravens |
| 1960 | (Belgium) André Durnez | (Italy) Antonio Conti | (Belgium) Ferdinand Geelen |
| 1961 | (Belgium) Auguste Hoefkens | (Belgium) Etienne Thomaes | (Belgium) Roger Coopmans |
| 1962 | (Belgium) Willy Monty | (Belgium) Jean-Baptiste Blavier | (Belgium) Albert Kesters |
| 1963 | (Belgium) Roger Engelen | (Belgium) Armand Van Den Bempt | (Belgium) Jose Riguelle |
| 1964 | (France) Bernard Guyot | (Belgium) Willy Van Neste | (Belgium) Jan Put |
| 1965 | (Belgium) Willy Van Neste | (Belgium) Jean Monteyne | (Belgium) Wilfried David |
| 1966 | (Netherlands) Evert Dolman | (Netherlands) Harry Steevens | (Netherlands) Rini Wagtmans |
| 1967 | (Belgium) Jos De Schoenmaecker | (United Kingdom) Peter Buckley | (Netherlands) Rini Wagtmans |
| 1968 | (Belgium) Jos De Schoenmaecker | (Belgium) Francis Yppersiel | (Belgium) Marc Sohet |
| 1969 | (Belgium) Frans Kerremans | (Belgium) Maurice Eyers | (Belgium) Julien Van Geebergen |
| 1970 | (Belgium) André Doyen | (Belgium) Luc Van Goidsenhoven | (Belgium) August Herijgers |
| 1971 | (Belgium) Rudi Rijpens | (Belgium) August Herijgers | (Italy) Gaetano Juliano |
| 1972 | (Soviet Union) Valeri Likatchev | (Soviet Union) Ivan Trifonov | (Soviet Union) Vikenti Basko |
| 1973 | (Belgium) Jacques Martin | (Belgium) Eddy Van Hoof | (Belgium) Francis Deminne |
| 1974 | (Netherlands) Henk Smits | (Belgium) Willy Vanden Ouweland | (Belgium) Pierre Sonnet |
| 1975 | (Belgium) Ferdi Van Den Haute | (Belgium) Bernard Lecocq | (Belgium) Francis Deminne |
| 1976 | (Belgium) Fons De Wolf | (Netherlands) Henk Lubberding | (Belgium) Frank Hoste |
| 1977 | (Belgium) Eddy Schepers | (Belgium) Christian Dumont | (Netherlands) Guus Bierings |
| 1978 | (Belgium) Roger De Cnijf | (Belgium) Dirk Vandewalle | (Belgium) Jean-Marie Wampers |
| 1979 | (Belgium) Etienne De Wilde | (Belgium) Francois De Decker | (West Germany) Erich Richter |
| 1980 | (Netherlands) John van Asten | (Netherlands) Gerrit Solleveld | (Netherlands) Ad Polak |
| 1981 | (Belgium) Ludo De Keulenaer | (Belgium) Thierry Septon | (Belgium) Alain Jamart |
| 1982 | (Belgium) Luc Brankaerts | (Belgium) Michel Dernies | (Netherlands) Peter Schroen |
| 1983 | (Netherlands) Victor Buisman | (Belgium) Luc Branckaerts | (Switzerland) Erik Stöcklin |
| 1984 | (Belgium) Eric Verweire | (Belgium) Luc Ronsse | (Belgium) Jean-Marie Michotte |
| 1985 | (Belgium) Peter Roes | (Belgium) Jan De Keyser | (Belgium) Alain Lefever |
| 1986 | (Belgium) Patrick Steeno | (Belgium) Frédéric Selvais | (Belgium) Luc Ronsse |
| 1987 | (Belgium) Jean-Paul Ven Der Straeten | (Belgium) Eric Boucher | (Belgium) Guy Rooms |
| 1988 | (Belgium) Wim Verbeeck | (Belgium) Eric Verweire | (Belgium) Marc Vrindts |
| 1989 | (Belgium) Wim Sels | (Belgium) Pierre Herinne | (Belgium) Marc Vrindts |
| 1990 | (Belgium) Sylvain Miel | (Belgium) Hervé Meyvisch | (Netherlands) Diederik Kempers |
| 1991 | (Belgium) Denis Minet | (Belgium) Kurt Van Nuffel | (Belgium) Gino Bos |
| 1992 | (Belgium) Gert Van Brabant | (Belgium) Jean-Pierre Dubois | (Belgium) Geert De Buck |
| 1993 | (Belgium) Rik Verbrugghe | (Belgium) Renaud Boxus | (Belgium) Geert De Buck |
| 1994 | (Norway) Sven-Gaute Hølestøl | (Belgium) Eddy Torrekens | (Belgium) Marc Bouillon |
| 1995 | (United States) Levi Leipheimer | (Belgium) Christophe Leeuwerck | (Belgium) Goswin Laplasse |
| 1996 | (Belgium) Davy Delme | (Belgium) Danny Van Looy | (Belgium) Benjamin Van Itterbeeck |
| 1997 | (Belgium) Peter Wuyts | (Belgium) Renaud Boxus | (Belgium) Davy Daniels |
| 1998 | (Belgium) Johan Van Nueten | (Belgium) David Debremaeker | (Belgium) Jurgen Van Roosbroeck |
| 1999 | (Belgium) Geoffrey Demeyere | (Belgium) Rudy Verdonck | (United Kingdom) Oliver Penney |
| 2000 | (Belgium) Sébastien Mattozza | (Finland) Matti Helminen | (Kazakhstan) Dmitriy Muravyev |
| 2001 | (France) Carlo Meneghetti | (Belgium) Philippe Gilbert | (Belgium) Andy Vanhoudt |
| 2002 | (Belgium) Pieter Mertens | (Finland) Matti Helminen | (Belgium) Serge Pauwels |
| 2003 | (Belgium) Daniel Verelst | (Netherlands) Kees Jeurissen | (Belgium) Frederik Veuchelen |
| 2004 | (Belgium) Joseph Boulton | (Belgium) Raphael Bastin | (Belgium) Kristof Vercouillie |
| 2005 | (Belgium) Gianni Meersman | (Belgium) Nico Kuypers | (Netherlands) Bjorn Hoeben |
| 2006 | (Belgium) Marc Streel | (Sweden) Fredrik Johansson | (Belgium) Kevyn Ista |
| 2007 | (Belgium) Romain Zingle | (Belgium) Pieter Vanspeybrouck | (Belgium) Geoffrey Demeyere |
| 2008 | (Belgium) Jens Renders | (Belgium) Stijn Neirynck | (Belgium) Eduard Bogaert |
| 2009 | (Netherlands) Sierk-Jan De Haan | (Belgium) Dries Hollanders | (Belgium) Pieter Serry |
| 2010 | (Belgium) Edwig Cammaerts | (Belgium) Olivier Pardini | (Belgium) Niels Nachtergaele |
| 2011 | (Belgium) Eliot Lietaer | (Belgium) Brecht Dhaene | (United States) Putt Tanner |
| 2012 | (Netherlands) Jasper Ockeloen | (Netherlands) Mike Teunissen | (Belgium) Dieter Bouvry |
| 2013 | (Belgium) Floris De Tier | (Belgium) Brecht Dhaene | (Netherlands) Peter Schulting |
| 2014 | (Belgium) Sander Cordeel | (Belgium) Axel Decorte | (Belgium) Dimitri Peyskens |
| 2015 | (Belgium) Jens Adams | (Belgium) Jimmy Janssens | (Belgium) Benjamin Declercq |
| 2016 | (Belgium) Laurens Sweeck | (Belgium) Mathias Van Gompel | (Belgium) Ludovic Robeet |
| 2017 | (Canada) William Elliot | (Belgium) Laurens Sweeck | (Belgium) Lennert Teugels |
| 2018 | (Belgium) Abram Stockman | (Netherlands) Rob Ruijgh | (Netherlands) Mathijs Paasschens |
| 2019 | (Belgium) Sander Elen | (Belgium) Sander De Pestel | (Belgium) Ward Vanhoof |
| 2020 | Cancelled | | |
| 2021 | (Belgium) Jenno Berckmoes | (Belgium) Thibau Nys | (Netherlands) Lars van der Haar |
| 2022 | (Netherlands) Frank van den Broek | (Belgium) Gil Gelders | (Belgium) Jago Willems |
| 2023 | (Belgium) Aaron Dockx | (Netherlands) Pim Ronhaar | (Belgium) Gerben Kuypers |
| 2024 | (France) Matys Grisel | (Belgium) Michiel Lambrecht | (Belgium) Jarno Bellens |
| 2025 | (Belgium) Victor Van de Putte | (Netherlands) David Haverdings | (Belgium) Lucas Van Gils |

=== Wins by country ===
| Number | Country |
|---|---|
| 59 | Belgium |
| 6 | Netherlands |
| 2 | France |
| 1 | Canada, Soviet Union, Norway, United States |
