= 1998 UCI Road World Championships – Men's under-23 time trial =

Men's U-23 Individual Time Trial
1998 UCI Road World Championships

Race details
- Dates: October 6, 1998
- Stages: 1
- Distance: 32.9 km (20.44 mi)
- Winning time: 00h 43' 20"

Medalists
	Gold	Thor Hushovd (NOR)	(Norway)
	Silver	Frédéric Finot (FRA)	(France)
	Bronze	Gianmario Ortenzi (ITA)	(Italy)

The Men's Under-23 Individual Time Trial at the 1998 UCI Road World Championships was held on October 6, 1998, from Maastricht to Vilt, Netherlands, over a total distance of 32.9 kilometres. There were a total number of 65 entries, with two non-starters: Gordon Bearman (New Zealand) and Dmitri Parfimovich (Russia).

== Final classification ==
Rank	Rider	Time
1st place, gold medalist(s)	Thor Hushovd (NOR)	00:43.20
2nd place, silver medalist(s)	Frédéric Finot (FRA)	+ 03,51
3rd place, bronze medalist(s)	Gianmario Ortenzi (ITA)	+ 10,64
4.	David George (RSA)	+ 16,82
5.	László Bodrogi (HUN)	+ 21,00
6.	Sébastien Wolski (POL)	+ 34,38
7.	Raimondas Vilcinskas (LTU)	+ 48,96
8.	Denis Bondarenko (RUS)	+ 51,06
9.	Cadel Evans (AUS)	+ 53,05
10.	Florian Wiesinger (AUT)	+ 57,43
11.	David Zabriskie (USA)	+ 1.00,44
12.	Marco Pinotti (ITA)	+ 1.06,64
13.	Oleg Yukov (RUS)	+ 1.11,30
14.	Ondrej Slobodnik (SVK)	+ 1.16,37
15.	Stephan Schreck (GER)	+ 1.17,00
16.	Martin Cotar (CRO)	+ 1.18,01
17.	Thorsten Rund (GER)	+ 1.20,00
18.	Geoffrey Demeyere (BEL)	+ 1.20,11
19.	Brent Aucutt (USA)	+ 1.20,14
20.	Mathew Hayman (AUS)	+ 1.21,42
21.	Marcel Duijn (NED)	+ 1.30,05
22.	Marlon Pérez (COL)	+ 1.34,12
23.	Sandro Güttinger (SUI)	+ 1.43,20
24.	Florent Brard (FRA)	+ 1.45,16
25.	Christian Poos (LUX)	+ 1.49,09
