= Gianmario Ortenzi =

Italian racing cyclist

Personal information
- Born: 23 June 1976 (age 50) Recanati, Italy

Cycling career
- Sport: Cycling
- Current team: Retired
- Discipline: Road
- Role: Rider

Amateur teams
- 1995: Scrigno
- 1997–1998: Sicc Cucine Componibili

Professional teams
- 1998: Mercatone Uno–Bianchi (stagiaire)
- 1999–2002: Mercatone Uno–Bianchi

Gianmario Ortenzi (born 23 June 1976) is an Italian former racing cyclist. Professional from 1998 to 2002, his biggest result was winning the bronze medal in the under-23 time trial at the 1998 UCI Road World Championships. He also rode in the 2001 Vuelta a España and the 2002 Giro d'Italia.

== Major results ==
1997
1st Time trial, National Under-23 Road Championships
2nd GP Palio del Recioto
3rd Overall Giro delle Regioni

1st Stage 3

1998
1st Overall Giro delle Regioni
3rd Time trial, UCI Under-23 Road World Championships
1999
2nd Overall Settimana Internazionale Coppi e Bartali
2nd Firenze–Pistoia
2nd Criterium d'Abruzzo
3rd GP d'Europe
6th Giro di Romagna
7th Gran Premio Bruno Beghelli
8th Trofeo Melinda
2001
1st Mountains classification, Three Days of De Panne
9th Overall Giro della Provincia di Lucca
