= Frédéric Finot =

French cyclist

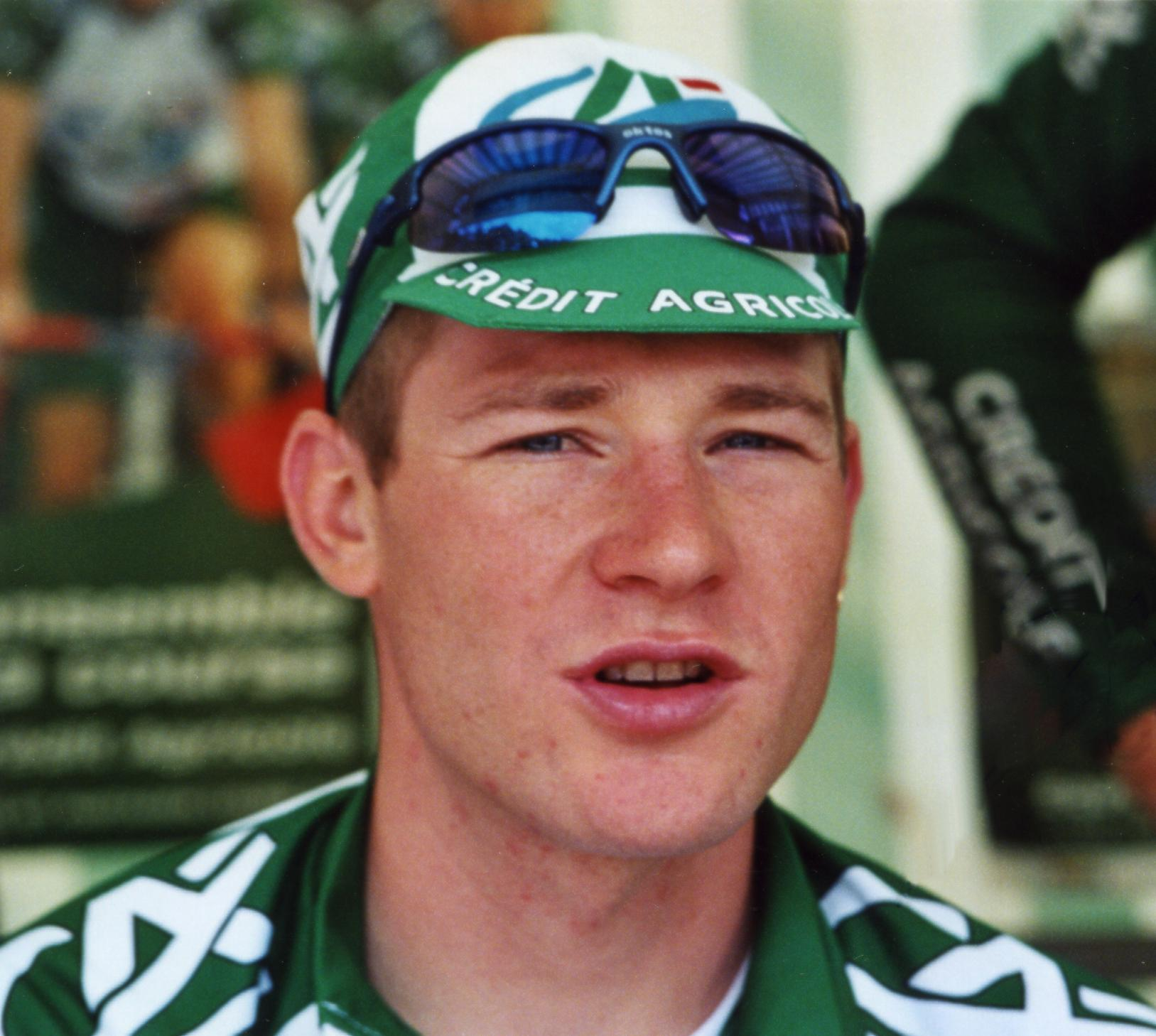

Personal information
- Born: 20 March 1977 (age 49) Nevers, France

Cycling career
- Sport: Cycling
- Current team: Retired
- Discipline: Road
- Role: Rider

Amateur teams
- 1998: VC Lyon Vaulx-en-Velin
- 2009–2011: Creusot Cycling
- 2012: Guidon chalettois
- 2014: Pro Immo Nicolas Roux

Professional teams
- 1999–2001: Crédit Agricole
- 2002–2004: R.A.G.T. Semences Jean Delatour
- 2005–2006: Française des Jeux
- 2007: Roubaix–Lille Métropole
- 2008: Differdange–Apiflo Vacances

Frédéric Finot (born 20 March 1977 in Nevers) is a French former road cyclist. He was professional 1999 to 2008.

== Career achievements ==
=== Major results ===
1993
1st Time trial, National Novice Road Championships
1995
3rd Time trial, National Junior Road Championships
1996
2nd Road race, National Under-23 Road Championships
1998
1st Stage 3 Le Triptyque des Monts et Châteaux
UCI Under-23 World Road Championships

2nd Time trial
9th Road race

1999
3rd Time trial, National Road Championships
2000
1st Prologue Tour de Normandie (TTT)
1st Stage 5 Tour de Wallonie
1st Stage 5 Tour de l'Avenir
3rd Duo Normand (with Anthony Langella)
4th Chrono des Herbiers
6th Grand Prix de Wallonie
7th Grand Prix des Nations
7th Tro-Bro Léon
2001
8th Grand Prix de Denain
2002
1st Tour du Doubs
2nd Grand Prix de Denain
2003
1st Stage 1 Four Days of Dunkirk
6th Tro-Bro Léon
2004
1st Boucles de l'Aulne
1st Duo Normand (with Eddy Seigneur)
3rd Time trial, National Road Championships
10th Grand Prix des Nations
10th Paris–Camembert
2005
1st Overall Paris–Corrèze

1st Stage 3

3rd Time trial, National Road Championships
6th Cholet-Pays de Loire
2006
3rd Tour du Doubs
7th Overall Circuit Franco-Belge
8th Tour du Finistère
2007
1st Stage 4 Route du Sud
4th Grand Prix de la Somme
2008
3rd Classic Loire Atlantique
9th Overall Boucle de l'Artois
2010
1st Stage 5 Tour Alsace

=== Grand Tour general classification results timeline ===
Grand Tour	2003	2004	2005	2006
Giro d'Italia	—	—	—	—
Tour de France	137	145	—	—
Vuelta a España	—	—	122	DNF

Legend
DSQ	Disqualified
DNF	Did not finish
