= 1997 E3 Prijs Vlaanderen =

1997 E3 Harelbeke
Race details
- Dates: 29 March 1997
- Stages: 1
- Distance: 206 km (128 mi)
- Winning time: 5h 11' 00"

Results
	Winner	Hendrik Van Dijck (BEL)	(TVM–Farm Frites)
	Second	Paolo Fornaciari (ITA)	(Saeco–Estro)
	Third	Brian Holm (DEN)	(Team Telekom)

The 1997 E3 Harelbeke was the 40th edition of the E3 Harelbeke cycle race and was held on 29 March 1997. The race started and finished in Harelbeke. The race was won by Hendrik Van Dijck of the TVM team.

== General classification ==
Final general classification

Rank	Rider	Team	Time
1	Hendrik Van Dijck (BEL)	TVM–Farm Frites	5h 11' 00"
2	Paolo Fornaciari (ITA)	Saeco–Estro	+ 0"
3	Brian Holm (DEN)	Team Telekom	+ 49"
4	Léon van Bon (NED)	Rabobank	+ 49"
5	Wim Feys (BEL)	Lotto–Mobistar–Isoglass	+ 49"
6	Wilfried Peeters (BEL)	Mapei–GB	+ 54"
7	Geert Van Bondt (BEL)	Vlaanderen 2002–Eddy Merckx	+ 1' 25"
8	Peter Van Petegem (BEL)	TVM–Farm Frites	+ 1' 25"
9	Andrei Tchmil (UKR)	Lotto–Mobistar–Isoglass	+ 1' 25"
10	Massimo Strazzer (ITA)	Roslotto–ZG Mobili	+ 1' 25"
