= Paolo Fornaciari =

Italian cyclist

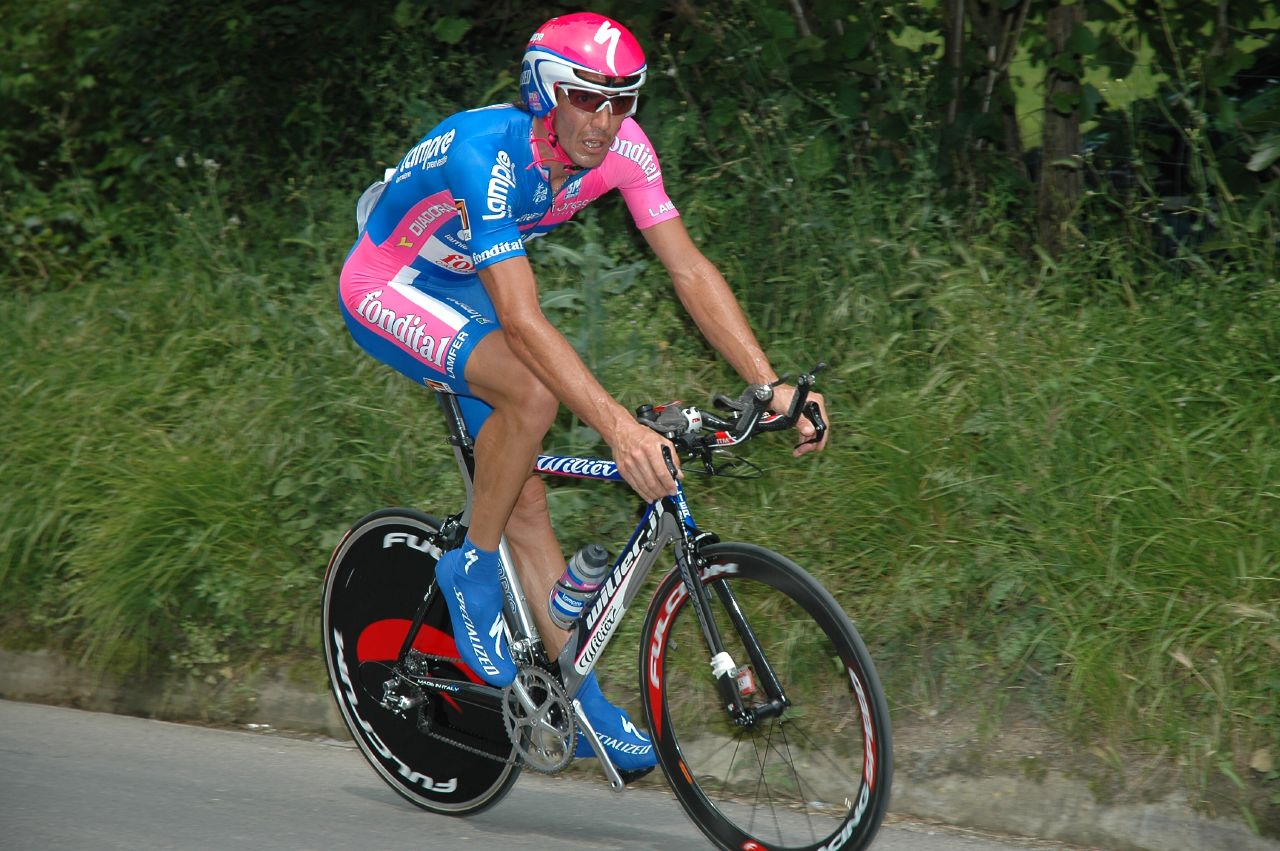

Personal information
- Full name: Paolo Fornaciari
- Born: 2 February 1971 (age 55) Viareggio, Italy
- Height: 1.91 m (6 ft 3 in)
- Weight: 80 kg (176 lb; 12 st 8 lb)

Cycling career
- Sport: Cycling
- Discipline: Road
- Role: Rider

Professional teams
- 1992–1995: Mercatone Uno
- 1996–1998: Saeco
- 1999–2002: Mapei–Quick Step
- 2003–2004: Saeco
- 2005–2008: Lampre

Paolo Fornaciari (born 2 February 1971 in Viareggio, Province of Lucca) is a former Italian professional road bicycle racer. Fornaciari retired at the end of the 2008 season.

== Major results ==
1993
2nd Milano–Torino
3rd Overall Settimana Internazionale di Coppi e Bartali
1994
1st Stage 10 Herald Sun Tour
1995
3rd Trofeo Pantalica
1996
2nd G.P. Camaiore
1997
2nd E3 Prijs Vlaanderen
10th Trofeo Laigueglia
1999
9th Overall Settimana Internazionale di Coppi e Bartali
