= Rémi Pauriol =

French cyclist

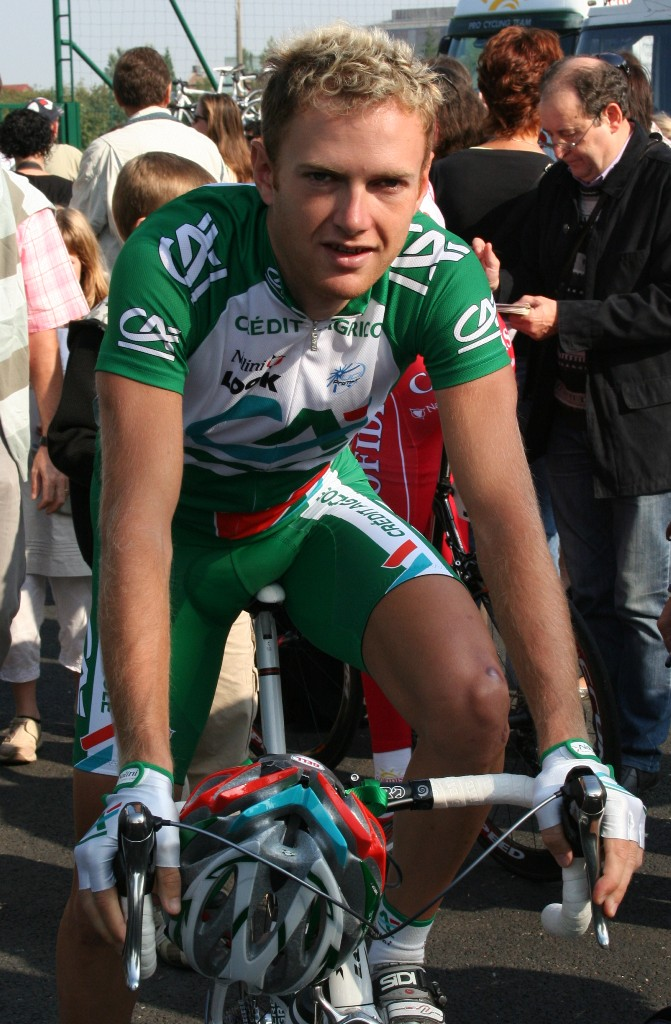

Personal information
- Full name: Rémi Pauriol
- Born: 4 April 1982 (age 44) Aix-en-Provence, France
- Height: 1.80 m (5 ft 11 in)
- Weight: 68 kg (150 lb)

Cycling career
- Sport: Cycling
- Current team: Retired
- Discipline: Road
- Role: Rider

Professional teams
- 2006–2008: Crédit Agricole
- 2009–2010: Cofidis
- 2011–2012: FDJ
- 2013: Sojasun

Major wins
- Route Adélie (2007); GP Lugano (2009); Grand Prix d'Ouverture (2009)

Rémi Pauriol (born 4 April 1982) is a French former professional road bicycle racer, who competed as a professional between 2006 and 2013.

In 2007, he won his first professional contest, the French race Route Adélie. In 2011, he signed with the French squad FDJ before moving to Sojasun in 2013. After the team folded at the end of the season, Pauriol retired in January 2014.

== Major results ==
2006
1st Stage 3 (TTT) Tour Méditerranéen
2nd Overall Paris–Corrèze
2007
1st Route Adélie
1st Stage 4 Tour de Wallonie
2008
3rd Overall Volta a Catalunya
3rd Tour du Finistère
2009
1st Grand Prix d'Ouverture
1st GP Lugano
2010
9th Overall Tour of Turkey

1st Mountains classification

2011
1st Mountains classification, Paris–Nice
1st Mountains classification, Tour Méditerranéen
2012
1st Les Boucles du Sud Ardèche
2013
2nd Classic Sud-Ardèche
6th Boucles de l'Aulne

=== Grand Tour general classification results timeline ===
Grand Tour	2006	2007	2008	2009	2010	2011	2012
Giro d'Italia	122	—	—	—	—	—	—
Tour de France	—	—	78	43	38	DNF	—
Vuelta a España	—	DNF	—	—	73	—	23

Legend
—	Did not compete
DNF	Did not finish
