= Thor Hushovd =

Norwegian cyclist

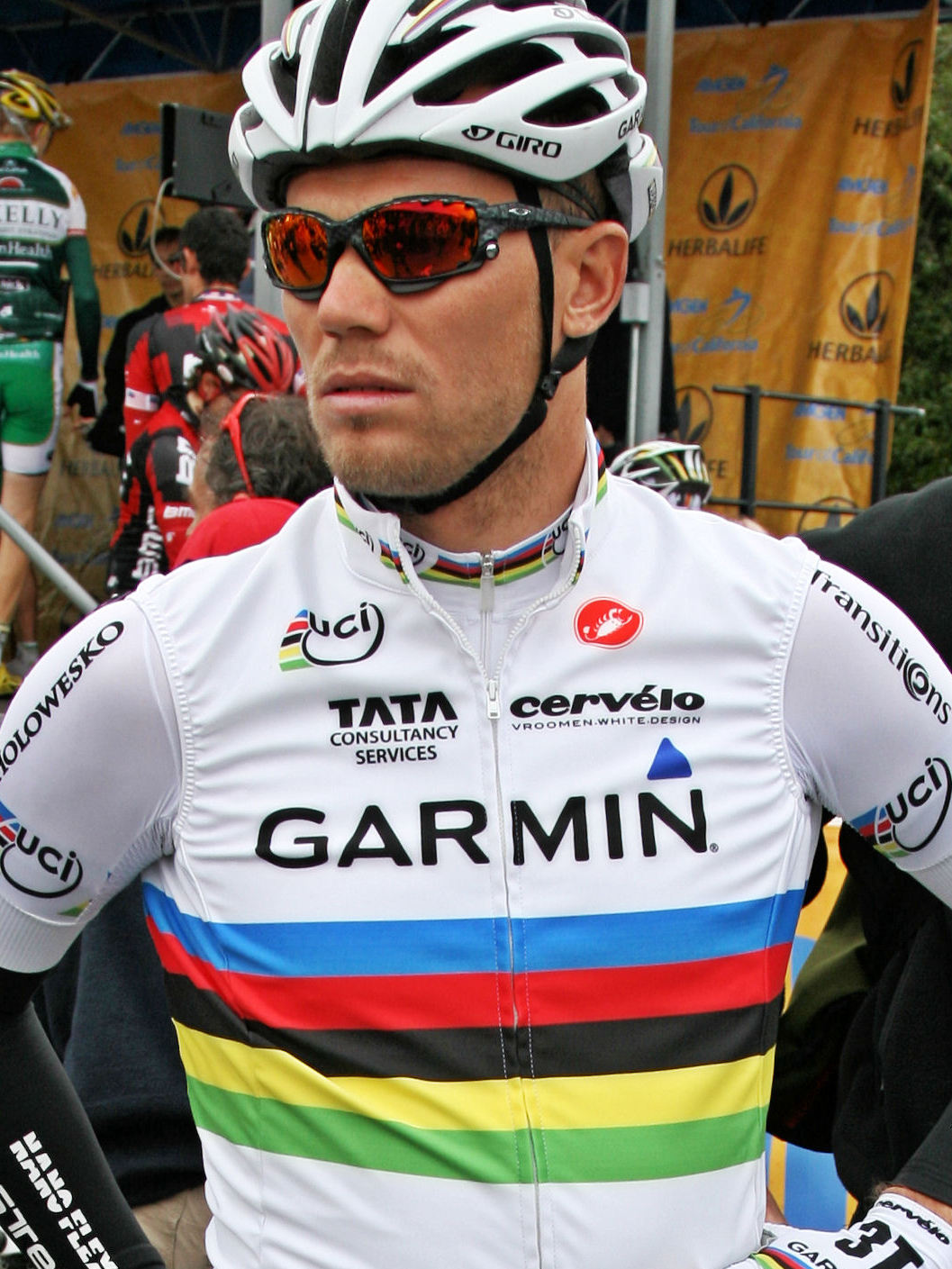
- Hushovd at the 2011 Tour of California

Personal information
- Full name: Thor Hushovd
- Nicknames: The God of Thunder; The Bull from Grimstad
- Born: 18 January 1978 (age 48) Grimstad Municipality, Norway
- Height: 1.83 m (6 ft 0 in)
- Weight: 79 kg (174 lb)

Cycling career
- Sport: Cycling
- Current team: Uno-X Mobility
- Discipline: Road
- Role: Rider (retired); General Manager
- Rider type: Sprinter; Classic specialist

Professional teams
- 2000–2008: Crédit Agricole
- 2009–2010: Cervélo TestTeam
- 2011: Garmin–Cervélo
- 2012–2014: BMC Racing Team

Managerial team
- 2024-: Uno-X Mobility

Major wins
- Grand Tours Tour de France Points classification (2005, 2009) 10 individual stages (2002, 2004, 2006–2011) 2 TTT stages (2001, 2011) Giro d'Italia 1 individual stage (2007) Vuelta a España Points classification (2006) 3 individual stages (2005, 2006, 2010) Single-day races and Classics World Road Race Championships (2010) National Road Race Championships (2004, 2010, 2013) National Time Trial Championships (2002, 2004, 2005) Gent–Wevelgem (2006) Omloop Het Nieuwsblad (2009)
Medal record
Men's road bicycle racing
Representing Norway
World Championships
Gold medal – first place	2010 Melbourne and Geelong	Road race

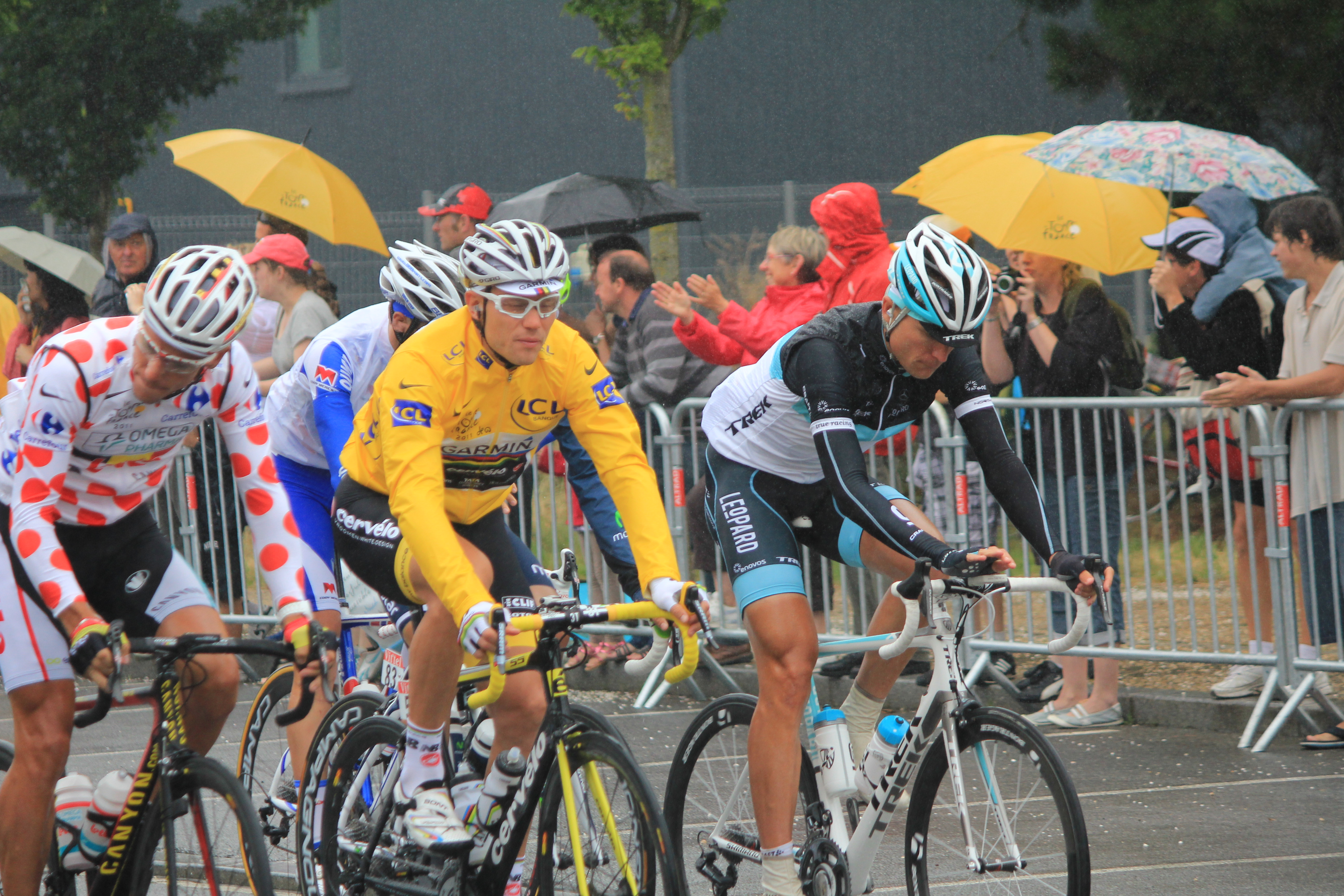
Hushovd (in yellow) at the 2011 Tour de France. Hushovd held the overall lead of the race from the second to the ninth stage of the race.

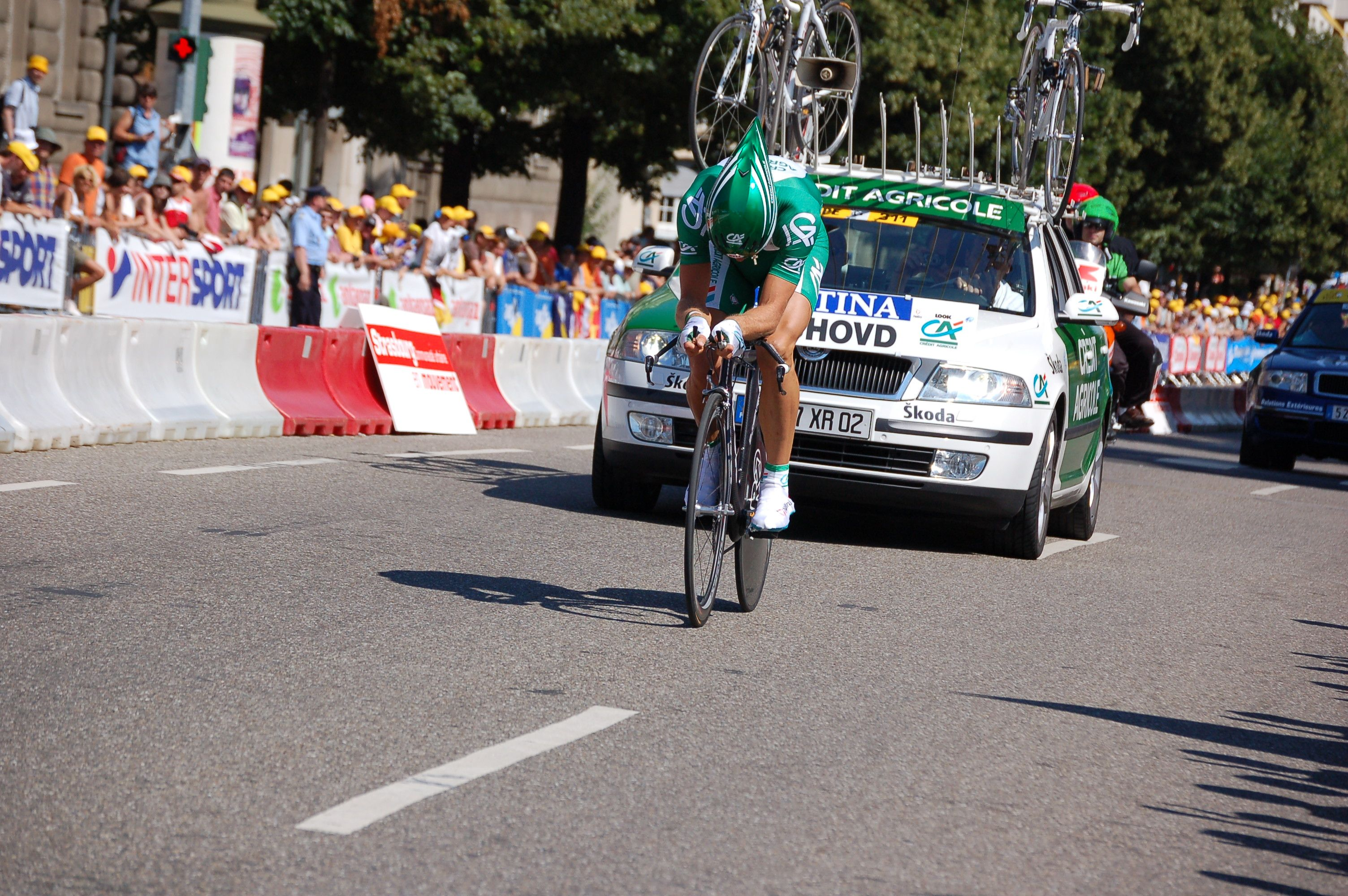
Hushovd at the 2006 Tour de France; his win in the prologue was one of two stage wins during the race.

Thor Hushovd (born 18 January 1978) is a Norwegian former professional road bicycle racer. He is known for sprinting and time trialing, having been a three-time Norwegian national road race champion (2004, 2010, 2013), and was the winner of the 2010 World Road Race Championships, making him the first Scandinavian to do so. He was also the first Norwegian to lead the Tour de France and is the Scandinavian with the most stage wins in Grand Tours. He is widely considered the greatest Norwegian cyclist of all time. He retired in September 2014.

== Career ==
Born in Grimstad Municipality in Aust-Agder county, Norway, Thor won the under-23 time trial world championship and the under-23 versions of Paris–Roubaix and Paris–Tours before turning professional in 1998. He was Norwegian time trial champion in 2004 and 2005 and road race champion in 2004 and 2010. In 2006, he won seven UCI ProTour races and two stages of the Tour de France. He won the prologue in Strasbourg and led after the first day despite a cut arm. He continued with stitches and regained the yellow jersey after stage 2 with a third place. He won the last stage, beating Robbie McEwen in a sprint, thus making him the only person to win the first stage or prologue and the last stage of the Tour de France in the same year. In the 2006 Vuelta a España he won stage 6, wore the golden jersey for three stages and won the points classification

At the 2008 Tour de France, Hushovd won stage 2 in a bunch finish.

=== 2009 ===
In 2009, Hushovd rode for the Cervélo TestTeam. He took one of the team's first victories of the season by winning Stage 3 of the Tour of California. At the Tour de France, he won green jersey for the points classification for the second time, ahead of Mark Cavendish. Typically the sprinter with the most stage victories wins the points classification, though Thor only won one stage, stage 6, while Cavendish won six. After a controversy on stage 14, where Cavendish was relegated to the back of the peloton for impeding Hushovd, Hushovd attacked alone on stage 17, a mountain stage, winning two intermediate sprints. Hushovd won stage 3 at the Tour of Missouri – 114 mi (183 km) over rolling hills – in September 2009, in a sprint finish.

=== 2010 ===
On 9 May 2010, Hushovd broke his collarbone on a training ride after colliding with a young girl. At the Tour de France, Hushovd won the third stage, which was an unusual one for the Tour since it featured 13 km (8.1 mi) of cobblestones. He prevailed in the sprint involving five other riders. That victory netted him the Green jersey, but he ultimately lost it to Alessandro Petacchi of the Lampre–Farnese Vini team.

On 3 October 2010, Thor won the road world championship, which started in Melbourne and finished in Geelong, Australia. He was the first Norwegian to win the rainbow jersey. VeloNews said: "Hushovd...dominated a bunch sprint at the end of a thrilling 267 km race, beating Denmark's Matti Breschel and Australia's Allan Davis." The favorite, Philippe Gilbert, was caught with three kilometers to go.

=== 2011 ===
During the 2011 Tour de France Hushovd took the lead in the general classification and surprised many by keeping it through several hilly stages that were not expected to suit him and second placed Cadel Evans could not over turn the 1 second advantage that Hushovd held. Thor surprised his fans again on stage 13 by being one of the first riders over the hors catégorie Col d'Aubisque and using his superior descending skills (he was clocked at 69 mph at one point) to catch and pass the leaders David Moncoutié and Jérémy Roy to take the stage. He used his descending skills again on stage 16 when he, Edvald Boasson Hagen and teammate Ryder Hesjedal went clear on the descent of the Col de Manse (a descent that overall runner up Andy Schleck deemed too dangerous for the tour) and beat Boasson Hagen in the final sprint to take his second stage of the tour.

=== 2012 ===
In 2012, Hushovd joined BMC Racing Team on a three-year contract. Suffering from a then unknown medical condition, he had to abandon the Giro d'Italia and cancelled his scheduled participation to the Tour de France and Olympic road race. The medical impairment was later identified as a "virus and muscle inflammation" by team doctors. Thor hardly achieved any notable result in the season except fourteenth at Paris–Roubaix. In October, he said that he hoped to put the bad year and the virus that ruined it behind him and that he was optimistic and motivated about the 2013 season.

=== 2013 ===
Hushovd earned his first win since the 2011 Tour of Britain with a sprint victory over Tom-Jelte Slagter of Blanco Pro Cycling on stage 1 of the Tour du Haut Var in February. It was also his first victory with BMC Racing Team.

=== Retirement ===
In June 2014, Hushovd announced that he would retire after the 2014 UCI Road World Championships after struggling with Infectious mononucleosis since 2012. However, after a hard crash suffered at the Tour du Poitou-Charentes, Hushovd said he would not participate in the World Championships. His last race was the GP Impanis-Van Petegem in September.

In 2015 Thor announced that he had started working on organizing an all-Norwegian UCI WorldTeam, with a plan to launch in the 2017 season to coincide with the hosting of the 2017 UCI Road World Championships in the Norwegian city of Bergen. The plans were put on hold due to lack of funding, although Hushovd never abandoned them.

In the meantime, the Norwegian cycling team Uno-X was established. The team achieved UCI ProTeam status in 2020. Hushovd was initially not affiliated with Uno-X, although he used his legendary status in the world of cycling to help influence the ASO in Uno-X's mission for a Wild Card to the 2023 Tour de France. In January 2024, Uno-X announced that Hushovd would become their new General Manager.

== Personal life ==
Thor currently resides in Monte Carlo, Monaco, with his wife Susanne, their daughter Isabel (b. 2009), and son Niklas (2012). The Hushovds also maintain an offseason residency in Grimstad Municipality, Aust-Agder, Norway.

== Career achievements ==
=== Major results ===
1995
1st Time trial, National Junior Road Championships
1996
National Junior Road Championships

1st Road race
1st Time trial

1998
UCI Road World Under-23 Championships

1st Time trial
5th Road race

1st Paris–Roubaix Espoirs
1st Paris–Tours Espoirs
5th Overall Tour of Sweden
1999 (1 pro win)
1st Overall Ringerike GP

1st Stages 2, 4 & 5

1st Tour du Loir-et-Cher
1st Stage 5 Tour of Sweden
6th Time trial, UCI Road World Under-23 Championships
6th Overall Ronde de l'Isard
2000 (1)
1st Stage 1 Tour de Picardie
1st Prologue Tour de l'Ain
2nd Overall Ringerike GP

1st Stages 3, 4 & 5

2nd Grand Prix de Denain
4th Overall Bayern Rundfahrt
4th Giro della Provincia di Siracusa
5th HEW Cyclassics
7th Time trial, Olympic Games
2001 (4)
1st Overall Tour de Normandie

1st Points classification
1st Prologue, Stages 1 & 4

1st Overall Tour of Sweden

1st Stages 1a (ITT) & 3

1st Overall Paris–Corrèze
1st Stage 5 (TTT) Tour de France
4th Paris–Tours
9th Grand Prix de Villers-Cotterêts
2002 (3)
National Road Championships

1st Time trial
3rd Road race

1st Stage 18 Tour de France
1st Stage 2 Tour de l'Ain
5th Overall Étoile de Bessèges
6th Overall Tour du Poitou Charentes et de la Vienne
8th Grand Prix Eddy Merckx (with Anthony Morin)
2003 (3)
1st Grote Prijs Jef Scherens
1st Stage 2 Critérium du Dauphiné Libéré
1st Stage 1 Vuelta a Castilla y León
3rd Overall Tour du Limousin
5th Overall Tour Méditerranéen
7th Overall Tour du Poitou Charentes et de la Vienne
10th GP Ouest–France
2004 (10)
National Road Championships

1st Road race
1st Time trial

1st Overall French Road Cycling Cup
1st Grand Prix de Denain
1st Classic Haribo
1st Tour de Vendée
1st Stage 8 Tour de France
1st Stage 1 Critérium du Dauphiné Libéré
Tour du Languedoc-Roussillon

1st Points classification
1st Stages 1 & 2

3rd Grand Prix de Cholet – Pays de Loire
3rd Grand Prix de Fourmies
5th Overall Critérium International
7th Ronde van Midden-Zeeland
8th Grand Prix de Villers-Cotterêts
8th Grand Prix de Plumelec-Morbihan
9th Overall Étoile de Bessèges

1st Stage 3

2005 (5)
1st Time trial, National Road Championships
Volta a Catalunya

1st Points classification
1st Stage 7

1st Stage 5 Vuelta a España
1st Stage 2 Critérium du Dauphiné Libéré
1st Stage 4 Tour du Limousin
1st Points classification, Tour de France
3rd Milan–San Remo
5th Gent–Wevelgem
6th Overall Four Days of Dunkirk

1st Stage 1

9th Paris–Roubaix
2006 (7)
1st Gent–Wevelgem
Tour de France

1st Prologue & Stage 20
Held after Stages 1 & 3

Vuelta a España

1st Points classification
1st Stage 6
Held after Stages 2–4

Volta a Catalunya

1st Points classification
1st Stage 3

1st Stage 7 Critérium du Dauphiné Libéré
1st Stage 4 Tirreno–Adriatico
1st Points classification, Four Days of Dunkirk
2nd Classic Haribo
4th Paris–Tours
2007 (2)
1st Stage 4 Tour de France
1st Stage 7 Giro d'Italia
2nd Road race, National Road Championships
2nd GP Ouest–France
3rd Grand Prix de Wallonie
4th Paris–Bourges
5th Grand Prix d'Isbergues
8th Paris–Tours
8th Paris–Brussels
2008 (6)
1st Stage 2 Tour de France
1st Stage 1 Tour Méditerranéen
1st Stage 6 Four Days of Dunkirk
Volta a Catalunya

1st Points classification
1st Prologue & Stage 1

Paris–Nice

1st Points classification
1st Prologue

3rd Omloop Het Volk
9th Milan–San Remo
2009 (7)
1st Omloop Het Nieuwsblad
Tour de France

1st Points classification
1st Stage 6
Combativity award Stage 17

Volta a Catalunya

1st Stages 1 & 6

Tour of Missouri

1st Points classification
1st Stage 3

1st Stage 3 Tour of California
1st Stage 4 Tour du Poitou Charentes et de la Vienne
3rd Road race, National Road Championships
3rd Paris–Roubaix
3rd Milan–San Remo
4th E3 Prijs Vlaanderen
5th Grand Prix of Aargau Canton
2010 (5)
1st Road race, UCI Road World Championships
1st Road race, National Road Championships
1st Stage 3 Tour de France
1st Stage 6 Vuelta a España
2nd Paris–Roubaix
6th Milan–San Remo
6th Kuurne–Brussels–Kuurne
2011 (4)
Tour de France

1st Stages 2 (TTT), 13 & 16
Held from Stage 2–9

1st Stage 4 Tour de Suisse
1st Stage 4 Tour of Britain
3rd Road race, National Road Championships
4th GP Ouest–France
8th Paris–Roubaix
2013 (9)
National Road Championships

1st Road race
2nd Time trial

1st Overall Arctic Race of Norway

1st Points classification
1st Stages 2 & 4

Tour de Pologne

1st Stages 3 & 5

1st Stage 3 Tour of Austria
1st Stage 1 Tour of Beijing
4th Grand Prix d'Isbergues
5th Overall Tour du Haut Var

1st Stage 1

6th GP Ouest–France
8th Vattenfall Cyclassics
2014
9th Gent–Wevelgem

=== Grand Tour general classification results timeline ===
Grand Tour	2001	2002	2003	2004	2005	2006	2007	2008	2009	2010	2011	2012	2013	2014
Giro d'Italia	—	—	—	—	—	—	DNF	—	—	—	—	DNF	—	—
Tour de France	DNF	112	118	104	116	120	138	96	106	111	68	—	—	—
/ Vuelta a España	—	—	—	—	DNF	82	—	—	—	DNF	—	—	—	—

=== Classics results timeline ===
Monument	2000	2001	2002	2003	2004	2005	2006	2007	2008	2009	2010	2011	2012	2013	2014
Milan–San Remo	—	48	73	—	—	3	13	—	9	3	6	127	—	DNF	56
Tour of Flanders	—	46	81	—	38	31	14	60	27	—	57	53	55	DNF	90
Paris–Roubaix	63	DNF	33	—	17	9	—	43	DNF	3	2	8	14	35	19
Liège–Bastogne–Liège	Did not contest during his career														
Giro di Lombardia	—	—	—	—	—	—	—	—	—	—	DNF	—	—	—	—
Classic	2000	2001	2002	2003	2004	2005	2006	2007	2008	2009	2010	2011	2012	2013	2014
Omloop Het Nieuwsblad	DNF	51	18	38	—	DNF	12	—	3	1	32	33	29	77	DNF
Kuurne–Brussels–Kuurne	41	20	41	—	11	DNF	DNF	—	34	—	6	—	—	NH	—
E3 Harelbeke	—	—	—	—	—	DNF	—	DNF	DNF	4	DNF	52	DNF	DNF	DNF
Gent–Wevelgem	—	11	70	—	DNF	5	1	11	15	—	—	70	48	17	9
Hamburg Cyclassics	5	96	23	118	97	—	—	82	—	—	—	65	—	8	DNF
GP Ouest–France	—	—	—	10	—	—	—	2	—	DNF	—	4	—	6	—
Paris–Tours	75	4	28	—	—	23	4	8	—	—	—	—	—	—	—

=== Major championships timeline ===
Event		2000	2001	2002	2003	2004	2005	2006	2007	2008	2009	2010	2011	2012	2013
Olympic Games	Time trial	7	Not held			31	Not held			—	Not held			—	NH
Olympic Games	Road race	DNF	Not held			DNF	Not held			—	Not held			—	NH
World Championships	Time trial	22	—	40	—	—	—	—	—	—	—	—	—	—	—
World Championships	Road race	109	—	142	—	—	114	114	19	—	DNF	1	170	—	DNF
National Championships	Time trial	—	—	1	—	1	1	—	—	—	—	—	—	—	2
National Championships	Road race	7	—	—	—	1	—	—	2	—	3	1	3	—	1

Legend
—	Did not compete
DNF	Did not finish

Awards
Preceded by Petter Northug	Norwegian Sportsperson of the Year; 2010	Succeeded by Alexander Dale Oen
