= 2003 Tro-Bro Léon =

Race details
- Dates: 1 June 2003
- Stages: 1
- Distance: 193 km (119.9 mi)
- Winning time: 4h 42' 48"

Results
	Winner	Samuel Dumoulin (FRA)
	Second	Philippe Gilbert (BEL)
	Third	Didier Rous (FRA)

The 2003 Tro-Bro Léon was the 20th edition of the Tro-Bro Léon cycle race and was held on 1 June 2003. The race was won by Samuel Dumoulin.

== General classification ==
Final general classification

Rank	Rider	Time
1	Samuel Dumoulin (FRA)	4h 42' 48"
2	Philippe Gilbert (BEL)	+ 0"
3	Didier Rous (FRA)	+ 14"
4	Stuart O'Grady (AUS)	+ 1' 31"
5	Nico Mattan (BEL)	+ 1' 33"
6	Frédéric Finot (FRA)	+ 1' 39"
7	Chris Peers (BEL)	+ 3' 31"
8	Yoann Le Boulanger (FRA)	+ 3' 34"
9	Sylvain Chavanel (FRA)	+ 3' 37"
10	Yannick Talabardon (FRA)	+ 3' 46"
