= 1998 UCI Road World Championships – Men's under-23 road race =

Men's U-23 Individual Road Race
1998 UCI Road World Championships

Race details
- Dates: October 9, 1998
- Stages: 1
- Distance: 172 km (106.9 mi)
- Winning time: 04h 00' 29"

Medalists
	Gold	Ivan Basso (ITA)	(Italy)
	Silver	Rinaldo Nocentini (ITA)	(Italy)
	Bronze	Danilo Di Luca (ITA)	(Italy)

The Men's Under-23 Individual Road Race at the 1998 UCI Road World Championships was held on October 9, 1998, in Valkenburg, Netherlands, over a total distance of 172 kilometres (10 x 17.2 km laps). There were a total number of 180 starters, with 130 cyclists actually finishing the race.

== Final classification ==
Rank	Rider	Time
1st place, gold medalist(s)	Ivan Basso (ITA)	04:00:29
2nd place, silver medalist(s)	Rinaldo Nocentini (ITA)	+ 00.16
3rd place, bronze medalist(s)	Danilo Di Luca (ITA)	s.t.
4.	Alexandre Usov (BLR)	s.t.
5.	Thor Hushovd (NOR)	s.t.
6.	René Haselbacher (AUT)	s.t.
7.	Hernán Antolinez (COL)	s.t.
8.	Sasa Gajicic (YUG)	+ 00.17
9.	Frédéric Finot (FRA)	s.t.
10.	Matej Stare (SLO)	s.t.
11.	Martin Elmiger (SUI)	s.t.
12.	Stephan Schreck (GER)	s.t.
13.	Christophe Brandt (BEL)	s.t.
14.	Andrejus Smirnovas (LTU)	s.t.
15.	Marius Sabaliaskas (LTU)	s.t.
16.	Benoît Joachim (LUX)	s.t.
17.	Dave Bruylandts (BEL)	s.t.
18.	Mathew Hayman (AUS)	s.t.
19.	Tadej Valjavec (SLO)	s.t.
20.	Cadel Evans (AUS)	s.t.
21.	Kjell Carlström (FIN)	s.t.
22.	Karsten Kroon (NED)	s.t.
23.	Jaroslaw Ryszewski (POL)	s.t.
24.	Dmitri Gaynytdinov (RUS)	s.t.
25.	Michael Reihs (DEN)	+ 00.18
