= José Luis Carrasco =

Spanish cyclist

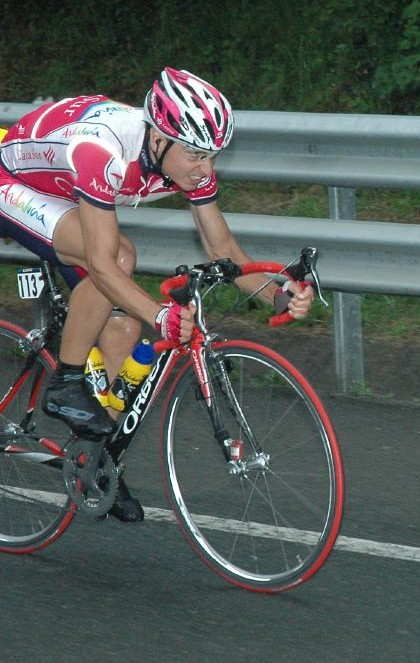

Personal information
- Full name: José Luis Carrasco Gamiz
- Born: 27 April 1982 (age 44) Jaén, Spain

Cycling career
- Sport: Cycling
- Discipline: Road
- Role: Rider

Professional teams
- 2005–2006: Caisse d'Epargne–Illes Balears
- 2007–2008: Andalucía–CajaSur

José Luis Carrasco Gamiz (born 27 April 1982 in Jaén) is a Spanish former professional road bicycle racer.

== Palmarès ==
2004
1st, Stage 2, Volta a Lleida, La Sau D'urgell
2005
1st, Mountains classification, Tirreno–Adriatico
2008
1st, Stage 6, Volta a Catalunya, Barcelona
