= 2004 Grand Prix de Denain =

Race details
- Dates: 15 April 2004
- Stages: 1
- Distance: 201.4 km (125.1 mi)
- Winning time: 4h 29' 33"

Results
	Winner	Thor Hushovd (NOR)
	Second	Mark Scanlon (IRL)
	Third	Nico Sijmens (BEL)

The 2004 Grand Prix de Denain was the 46th edition of the Grand Prix de Denain cycle race and was held on 15 April 2004. The race was won by Thor Hushovd.

== General classification ==
Final general classification

Rank	Rider	Time
1	Thor Hushovd (NOR)	4h 29' 33"
2	Mark Scanlon (IRL)	+ 0"
3	Nico Sijmens (BEL)	+ 46"
4	Ludovic Auger (FRA)	+ 46"
5	Borut Božič (SLO)	+ 46"
6	Erwin Thijs (BEL)	+ 46"
7	Franck Pencolé (FRA)	+ 46"
8	Eelke van der Wal (NED)	+ 46"
9	Jurgen Van de Walle (BEL)	+ 59"
10	Jean-Michel Tessier (FRA)	+ 1' 48"
