= 1999 Bayern Rundfahrt =

Race details
- Dates: 20–24 May 1999
- Stages: 5
- Distance: 873.5 km (542.8 mi)
- Winning time: 20h 23' 37"

Results
	Winner	Rolf Aldag (GER)
	Second	Svein Gaute Hølestøl (NOR)
	Third	Torsten Schmidt (GER)

The 1999 Bayern Rundfahrt was the 20th edition of the Bayern Rundfahrt cycle race and was held on 20 May to 24 May 1999. The race started in Scheinfeld and finished in Oberstdorf. The race was won by Rolf Aldag.

== General classification ==
Final general classification

Rank	Rider	Time
1	Rolf Aldag (GER)	20h 23' 37"
2	Svein Gaute Hølestøl (NOR)	+ 20"
3	Torsten Schmidt (GER)	+ 26"
4	Thomas Liese (GER)	+ 1' 00"
5	Christian Henn (GER)	+ 1' 05"
6	Ronny Lauke (GER)	+ 1' 12"
7	Sven Teutenberg (GER)	+ 1' 27"
8	Kurt Van Lancker (BEL)	+ 1' 43"
9	Kris Gerits (BEL)	+ 6' 22"
10	Kristof Trouvé (BEL)	+ 7' 15"
