= Wim Feys =

Belgian cyclist

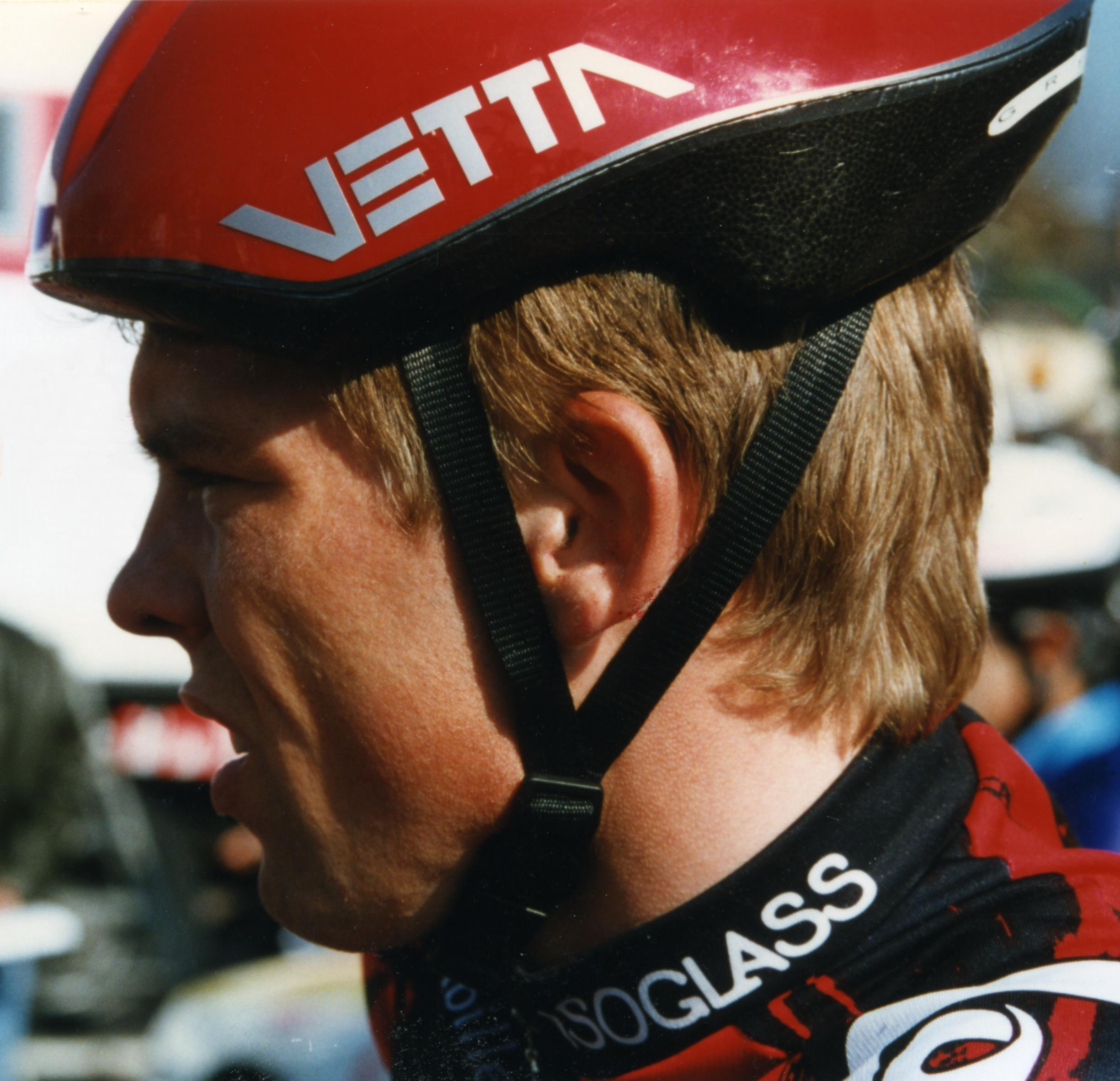
- Feys at the 1997 Paris–Nice

Personal information
- Born: 16 December 1971 (age 54) Ardooie, Belgium

Cycling career
- Sport: Cycling
- Current team: Retired
- Discipline: Road
- Role: Rider

Professional teams
- 1994–1996: Vlaanderen 2002–Eddy Merckx
- 1997–1999: Lotto–Mobistar
- 2000: Palmans–Ideal

Wim Feys (born 16 December 1971 in Ardooie) is a Belgian former cyclist. He was forced to retire in 2000 because of heart problems.

== Palmarès ==
1993
1st Zellik–Galmaarden
1997
1st GP Briek Schotte
2nd Nokere Koerse
5th E3 Prijs Vlaanderen
1998
5th Nokere Koerse
1999
9th Omloop Het Volk
