= 2008 Volta a Catalunya =

2008 UCI ProTour, race 7 of 15

Race details
- Dates: May 19–25, 2008
- Stages: 6 & Prologue
- Distance: 1,032.0 km (641.3 mi)
- Winning time: 24h 29' 22"

Results
	Winner	Gustavo César (ESP)	(Karpin–Galicia)
	Second	Rigoberto Urán (COL)	(Caisse d'Epargne)
	Third	Rémi Pauriol (FRA)	(Crédit Agricole)
	Points	Thor Hushovd (NOR)	(Crédit Agricole)
	Mountains	Christophe Moreau (FRA)	(Agritubel)
	Sprints	Manuel Quinziato (ITA)	(Liquigas)
	Team	(Luxembourg) Astana	

The 2008 Volta a Catalunya (88th edition) road cycling race took place from May 19 to May 25, 2008, in Catalonia, Spain. Gustavo César took overall victory, becoming first rider of non-ProTour team to win a ProTour race general classification.

== Teams ==
Twenty-two teams of up to eight riders took part. The following UCI ProTour and UCI Professional Continental teams were named to the 2008 Volta a Catalunya:

Belgium

- Quick-Step (QST)
- Silence–Lotto (SIL)

Denmark

- Team CSC (CSC)

France

- Ag2r–La Mondiale (ALM)
- Agritubel (AGR)
- Bouygues Télécom (BTL)
- Cofidis (COF)
- Crédit Agricole (C.A)
- Française des Jeux (FDJ)

(Germany)

- Gerolsteiner (GST)
- Team Milram (MRM)

Italy

- Lampre (LAM)
- Liquigas (LIQ)

Luxembourg

- Astana (AST)

Netherlands

- Rabobank (RAB)

(Spain)

- Andalucía–CajaSur (AZA)
- Caisse d'Epargne (GCE)
- Euskaltel–Euskadi (EUS)
- Karpin–Galicia (KGZ)
- Saunier Duval–Scott (SDV)

United States

- Slipstream–Chipotle (TSL)
- Team High Road (THR)

== Route ==
Stage characteristics and winners
Stage	Date	Course	Distance	Type	Winner
P	19 May	Lloret de Mar to Lloret de Mar	3.7 km (2.3 mi)	Individual time trial	Thor Hushovd (NOR)
1	20 May	Riudellots de la Selva to Banyoles	167.8 km (104.3 mi)		Thor Hushovd (NOR)
2	21 May	Banyoles to La Seu d'Urgell	191.1 km (118.7 mi)		Cyril Dessel (FRA)
3	22 May	La Seu d'Urgell to Ascó	217.2 km (135.0 mi)		Pierrick Fédrigo (FRA)
4	23 May	Ascó to El Vendrell	163.5 km (101.6 mi)		Sylvain Chavanel (FRA)
5	24 May	El Vendrell to Pallejà	163.9 km (101.8 mi)		Francesco Chicchi (ITA)
6	25 May	Pallejà to Barcelona	106.2 km (66.0 mi)		José Luis Carrasco (ESP)

== Stages ==
=== Prologue ===
May 19, 2008: Lloret de Mar to Lloret de Mar, 3.7 km (2.3 mi) (ITT)

Prologue Results

	Cyclist	Team	Time
1	Thor Hushovd (NOR)	Crédit Agricole	4' 37"
2	George Hincapie (USA)	Team High Road	+ 6"
3	Iván Gutiérrez (ESP)	Caisse d'Epargne	+ 7"
4	Thomas Lövkvist (SWE)	Team High Road	+ 7"
5	Gustavo César (ESP)	Karpin–Galicia	+ 7"

General Classification after Prologue

	Cyclist	Team	Time
1	Thor Hushovd (NOR)	Crédit Agricole	4' 37"
2	George Hincapie (USA)	Team High Road	+ 6"
3	Iván Gutiérrez (ESP)	Caisse d'Epargne	+ 7"
4	Thomas Lövkvist (SWE)	Team High Road	+ 7"
5	Gustavo César (ESP)	Karpin–Galicia	+ 7"

=== Stage 1 ===
May 20, 2008: Riudellots de la Selva to Banyoles, 167.8 km (104.3 mi)

Stage 1 Results

	Cyclist	Team	Time
1	Thor Hushovd (NOR)	Crédit Agricole	4h 07' 35"
2	Bernhard Eisel (AUT)	Team High Road	s.t.
3	Leonardo Duque (COL)	Cofidis	s.t.
4	Markus Zberg (SUI)	Gerolsteiner	s.t.
5	Mark Renshaw (AUS)	Crédit Agricole	s.t.

General Classification after Stage 1

	Cyclist	Team	Time
1	Thor Hushovd (NOR)	Crédit Agricole	4h 12' 02"
2	Leonardo Duque (COL)	Cofidis	+ 14"
3	George Hincapie (USA)	Team High Road	+ 16"
4	Iván Gutiérrez (ESP)	Caisse d'Epargne	+ 17"
5	Thomas Lövkvist (SWE)	Team High Road	+ 17"

=== Stage 2 ===
May 21, 2008: Banyoles to La Seu d'Urgell, 191.1 km (118.7 mi)

Stage 2 Results

	Cyclist	Team	Time
1	Cyril Dessel (FRA)	Ag2r–La Mondiale	5h 10' 30"
2	Janez Brajkovič (SLO)	Astana	+ 34"
3	Rémi Pauriol (FRA)	Crédit Agricole	+ 34"
4	Josep Jufré (ESP)	Saunier Duval–Scott	+ 34"
5	Rigoberto Urán (COL)	Caisse d'Epargne	+ 34"

General Classification after Stage 2

	Cyclist	Team	Time
1	Cyril Dessel (FRA)	Ag2r–La Mondiale	9h 23' 03"
2	Rémi Pauriol (FRA)	Crédit Agricole	+ 18"
3	Haimar Zubeldia (ESP)	Euskaltel–Euskadi	+ 25"
4	Janez Brajkovič (SLO)	Astana	+ 26"
5	Rigoberto Urán (COL)	Caisse d'Epargne	+ 29"

=== Stage 3 ===
May 22, 2008: La Seu d'Urgell to Ascó "La Vostra Energia", 217.2 km (135.0 mi)

Stage 3 Results

	Cyclist	Team	Time
1	Pierrick Fédrigo (FRA)	Bouygues Télécom	5h 06' 01"
2	Alexander Bocharov (RUS)	Crédit Agricole	s.t.
3	Gustavo César (ESP)	Karpin–Galicia	s.t.
4	Jelle Vanendert (BEL)	Française des Jeux	s.t.
5	Daniel Navarro (ESP)	Astana	s.t.

General Classification after Stage 3

	Cyclist	Team	Time
1	Rémi Pauriol (FRA)	Crédit Agricole	14h 29' 33"
2	Haimar Zubeldia (ESP)	Euskaltel–Euskadi	+ 7"
3	Janez Brajkovič (SLO)	Astana	+ 8"
4	Pierrick Fédrigo (FRA)	Bouygues Télécom	+ 10"
5	Rigoberto Urán (COL)	Caisse d'Epargne	+ 11"

=== Stage 4 ===
May 23, 2008: Ascó "La Vostra Energia" to El Vendrell, 163.5 km (101.6 mi)

Stage 4 Results

	Cyclist	Team	Time
1	Sylvain Chavanel (FRA)	Cofidis	3h 52' 15"
2	Thor Hushovd (NOR)	Crédit Agricole	+ 2' 32"
3	Bernhard Eisel (AUT)	Team High Road	+ 2' 32"
4	Markus Zberg (SUI)	Gerolsteiner	+ 2' 32"
5	Anthony Geslin (FRA)	Bouygues Télécom	+ 2' 32"

General Classification after Stage 4

	Cyclist	Team	Time
1	Rémi Pauriol (FRA)	Crédit Agricole	18h 24' 25"
2	Josep Jufré (ESP)	Saunier Duval–Scott	+ 2"
3	Haimar Zubeldia (ESP)	Euskaltel–Euskadi	+ 7"
4	Janez Brajkovič (SLO)	Astana	+ 8"
5	Gustavo César (ESP)	Karpin–Galicia	+ 8"

=== Stage 5 ===
May 24, 2008: El Vendrell to Pallejà, 163.9 km (101.8 mi)

Stage 5 Results

	Cyclist	Team	Time
1	Francesco Chicchi (ITA)	Liquigas	3h 44' 17"
2	Leonardo Duque (COL)	Cofidis	s.t.
3	Markus Zberg (SUI)	Gerolsteiner	s.t.
4	Mark Renshaw (AUS)	Crédit Agricole	s.t.
5	Mikel Gaztañaga (ESP)	Agritubel	s.t.

General Classification after Stage 5

	Cyclist	Team	Time
1	Rémi Pauriol (FRA)	Crédit Agricole	22h 08' 42"
2	Josep Jufré (ESP)	Saunier Duval–Scott	+ 2"
3	Haimar Zubeldia (ESP)	Euskaltel–Euskadi	+ 7"
4	Janez Brajkovič (SLO)	Astana	+ 8"
5	Gustavo César (ESP)	Karpin–Galicia	+ 8"

=== Stage 6 ===
May 25, 2008: Pallejà to Barcelona, 106.2 km (66.0 mi)

Stage 6 Results

	Cyclist	Team	Time
1	José Luis Carrasco (ESP)	Andalucía–CajaSur	2h 20' 38"
2	Gustavo César (ESP)	Karpin–Galicia	s.t.
3	Francisco Ventoso (ESP)	Andalucía–CajaSur	+ 7"
4	Aleksandr Kuschynski (BLR)	Liquigas	+ 7"
5	Eduardo Gonzalo (ESP)	Agritubel	+ 7"

General Classification after Stage 6

	Cyclist	Team	Time
1	Gustavo César (ESP)	Karpin–Galicia	24h 29' 22"
2	Rigoberto Urán (COL)	Caisse d'Epargne	+ 16"
3	Rémi Pauriol (FRA)	Crédit Agricole	+ 21"
4	Josep Jufré (ESP)	Saunier Duval–Scott	+ 21"
5	Daniel Navarro (ESP)	Astana	+ 23"

== Jersey progress ==
Stage	Winner	General Classification	Mountains Classification	Points Classification	Sprints classification	Team Classification
P	Thor Hushovd	Thor Hushovd	no award	Thor Hushovd	no award	Crédit Agricole
1	Thor Hushovd	Thor Hushovd	Dario Cioni	Thor Hushovd	Freddy Bichot	Crédit Agricole
2	Cyril Dessel	Cyril Dessel	Christophe Moreau	Thor Hushovd	Freddy Bichot	Ag2r–La Mondiale
3	Pierrick Fédrigo	Rémi Pauriol	Christophe Moreau	Thor Hushovd	Freddy Bichot	Astana
4	Sylvain Chavanel	Rémi Pauriol	Christophe Moreau	Thor Hushovd	Sylvain Chavanel	Astana
5	Francesco Chicchi	Rémi Pauriol	Christophe Moreau	Thor Hushovd	Manuel Quinziato	Astana
6	José Luis Carrasco	Gustavo César	Christophe Moreau	Thor Hushovd	Manuel Quinziato	Astana
Final		Gustavo César	Christophe Moreau	Thor Hushovd	Manuel Quinziato	Astana

Jersey wearers when one rider is leading two or more competitions

- On stage 1, George Hincapie wore the points jersey
- On stage 2, Leonardo Duque wore the points jersey

== Individual standings ==
As of 25 May 2008, after the 2008 Volta a Catalunya.

Rank	Name	Team	Points
1	Damiano Cunego (ITA)	Lampre	73
2	André Greipel (GER)	Team High Road	62
3	Alberto Contador (ESP)	Astana	58
4	Thomas Dekker (NED)	Rabobank	54
5	Andreas Klöden (GER)	Astana	53
6	Stijn Devolder (BEL)	Quick-Step	50
7	José Joaquín Rojas (ESP)	Caisse d'Epargne	45
8	Mikel Astarloza (ESP)	Euskaltel–Euskadi	45
9	Cadel Evans (AUS)	Silence–Lotto	42
10	Óscar Freire (ESP)	Rabobank	40
11	Rigoberto Urán (COL)	Caisse d'Epargne	40
12	Roman Kreuziger (CZE)	Liquigas	40
13	Nick Nuyens (BEL)	Cofidis	40
14	Rémi Pauriol (FRA)	Crédit Agricole	36

- 78 riders have scored at least one point on the 2008 UCI ProTour.

== See also ==
- 2008 in road cycling
