= 2005 Tirreno–Adriatico =

2005 UCI ProTour, race 2 of 28

Race details
- Dates: 9–15 March 2005
- Stages: 7
- Distance: 1,235.4 km (767.6 mi)
- Winning time: 32h 37' 19"

Results
| Jersey awarded to the overall winner | Winner | Óscar Freire (ESP) | (Rabobank) |
| | Second | Alessandro Petacchi (ITA) | (Fassa Bortolo) |
| | Third | Danilo Hondo (GER) | (Gerolsteiner) |
| Jersey awarded to the points classification winner | Points | Óscar Freire (ESP) | (Rabobank) |
| Jersey awarded to the mountains classification winner | Mountains | José Luis Carrasco (ESP) | (Illes Balears–Banesto) |
| | Team | (Italy) Ceramica Panaria–Navigare | |

The 2005 Tirreno–Adriatico was the 40th edition of the Paris–Nice cycle race and was held from 9 March to 15 March 2005. The race started in Civitavecchia and finished in San Benedetto del Tronto. The race was won by the then-current road race world champion Óscar Freire of Rabobank.

== Teams ==
Twenty-three teams, containing a total of 184 riders, participated in the race:

- Quick-Step–Innergetic
- Acqua & Sapone–Adria Mobil
- Bouygues Télécom
- Ceramica Panaria–Navigare
- Cofidis
- Crédit Agricole
- Davitamon–Lotto
- Discovery Channel
- Domina Vacanze
- Euskaltel–Euskadi
- Fassa Bortolo
- Française des Jeux
- Gerolsteiner
- Illes Balears–Caisse d'Epargne
- Lampre–Caffita
- Liberty Seguros–Würth
- Liquigas–Bianchi
- Naturino–Sapore di Mare
- Phonak
- Rabobank
- Saunier Duval–Prodir
- Team CSC
- T-Mobile Team

== Route ==
Stage characteristics and winners
| Stage | Date | Course | Distance | Type | Winner |
|---|---|---|---|---|---|
| 1 | 9 March | Civitavecchia to Civitavecchia | 160 km (99 mi) | Hilly stage | Alessandro Petacchi (ITA) |
| 2 | 10 March | Civitavecchia to Tivoli | 181 km (112 mi) | Hilly stage | Óscar Freire (ESP) |
| 3 | 11 March | Tivoli to Torricella | 228 km (142 mi) | Medium mountain stage | Óscar Freire (ESP) |
| 4 | 12 March | Teramo to Servigliano | 160 km (99 mi) | Hilly stage | Óscar Freire (ESP) |
| 5 | 13 March | Saltara to Saltara | 170.4 km (105.9 mi) | Flat stage | Servais Knaven (NED) |
| 6 | 14 March | Civitanova Marche to Civitanova Marche | 164 km (102 mi) | Hilly stage | Alessandro Petacchi (ITA) |
| 7 | 15 March | San Benedetto del Tronto | 164 km (102 mi) | Flat stage | Alessandro Petacchi (ITA) |

== Stages ==
=== Stage 1 ===
9 March 2005 — Civitavecchia to Civitavecchia, 160 km (99 mi)

| | Cyclist | Team | Time |
|---|---|---|---|
| 1 | Alessandro Petacchi (ITA) | Fassa Bortolo | 4h 25'35" |
| 2 | Bernhard Eisel (AUT) | Française des Jeux | s.t. |
| 3 | Robbie McEwen (AUS) | Davitamon–Lotto | s.t. |

=== Stage 2 ===
10 March 2005 — Civitavecchia to Tivoli, 181 km (112 mi)

| | Cyclist | Team | Time |
|---|---|---|---|
| 1 | Óscar Freire (ESP) | Rabobank | 4h 45'36" |
| 2 | Ángel Vicioso (ESP) | Liberty Seguros–Würth | s.t. |
| 3 | Laurent Brochard (FRA) | Bouygues Télécom | s.t. |

=== Stage 3 ===
11 March 2005 — Tivoli to Torricella, 228 km (142 mi)

| | Cyclist | Team | Time |
|---|---|---|---|
| 1 | Óscar Freire (ESP) | Rabobank | 5h 52'07" |
| 2 | Laurent Brochard (FRA) | Bouygues Télécom | s.t. |
| 3 | Danilo Hondo (GER) | Gerolsteiner | s.t. |

=== Stage 4 ===
12 March 2005 — Teramo to Servigliano, 160 km (99 mi)

| | Cyclist | Team | Time |
|---|---|---|---|
| 1 | Óscar Freire (ESP) | Rabobank | 4h 53'27" |
| 2 | Danilo Hondo (GER) | Gerolsteiner | s.t. |
| 3 | Fabrizio Guidi (ITA) | Phonak | s.t. |

=== Stage 5 ===
13 March 2005 — Saltara to Saltara, 170.4 km (105.9 mi)

| | Cyclist | Team | Time |
|---|---|---|---|
| 1 | Servais Knaven (NED) | Quick-Step–Innergetic | 4h 22'42" |
| 2 | Andrea Peron (ITA) | Team CSC | + 17" |
| 3 | Pavel Padrnos (CZE) | Discovery Channel | s.t. |

=== Stage 6 ===
14 March 2005 — Civitanova Marche to Civitanova Marche, 164 km (102 mi)

| | Cyclist | Team | Time |
|---|---|---|---|
| 1 | Alessandro Petacchi (ITA) | Fassa Bortolo | 3h 53'40" |
| 2 | Óscar Freire (ESP) | Rabobank | s.t. |
| 3 | Robbie McEwen (AUS) | Davitamon–Lotto | s.t. |

=== Stage 7 ===
15 March 2005 — San Benedetto del Tronto, 164 km (102 mi)

| | Cyclist | Team | Time |
|---|---|---|---|
| 1 | Alessandro Petacchi (ITA) | Fassa Bortolo | 4h 23'22" |
| 2 | Mario Cipollini (ITA) | Liquigas–Bianchi | s.t. |
| 3 | Danilo Hondo (GER) | Gerolsteiner | s.t. |

== General standings ==
| | Cyclist | Team | Time |
|---|---|---|---|
| 1 | Óscar Freire (ESP) | Rabobank | 32h 37'19" |
| 2 | Alessandro Petacchi (ITA) | Fassa Bortolo | + 9" |
| 3 | Danilo Hondo (GER) | Gerolsteiner | + 25" |
| 4 | Fabrizio Guidi (ITA) | Phonak | s.t. |
| 5 | Laurent Brochard (FRA) | Bouygues Télécom | + 33" |
| 6 | George Hincapie (USA) | Discovery Channel | + 36" |
| 7 | Ángel Vicioso (ESP) | Liberty Seguros–Würth | + 37" |
| 8 | Markus Zberg (SUI) | Gerolsteiner | + 40" |
| 9 | Patrice Halgand (FRA) | Crédit Agricole | s.t. |
| 10 | Andreas Klier (GER) | T-Mobile Team | + 42" |

- Danilo Hondo was later disqualified for failing a doping test.

== KOM classification ==
| | Cyclist | Team |
|---|---|---|
| 1 | José Luis Carrasco (ESP) | Illes Balears–Caisse d'Epargne |

== Points classification ==
| | Cyclist | Team |
|---|---|---|
| 1 | Óscar Freire (ESP) | Rabobank |

== Best team ==
| | Team | Country |
|---|---|---|
| 1 | Ceramica Panaria–Navigare | Italy |
