= Steven Caethoven =

Belgian cyclist

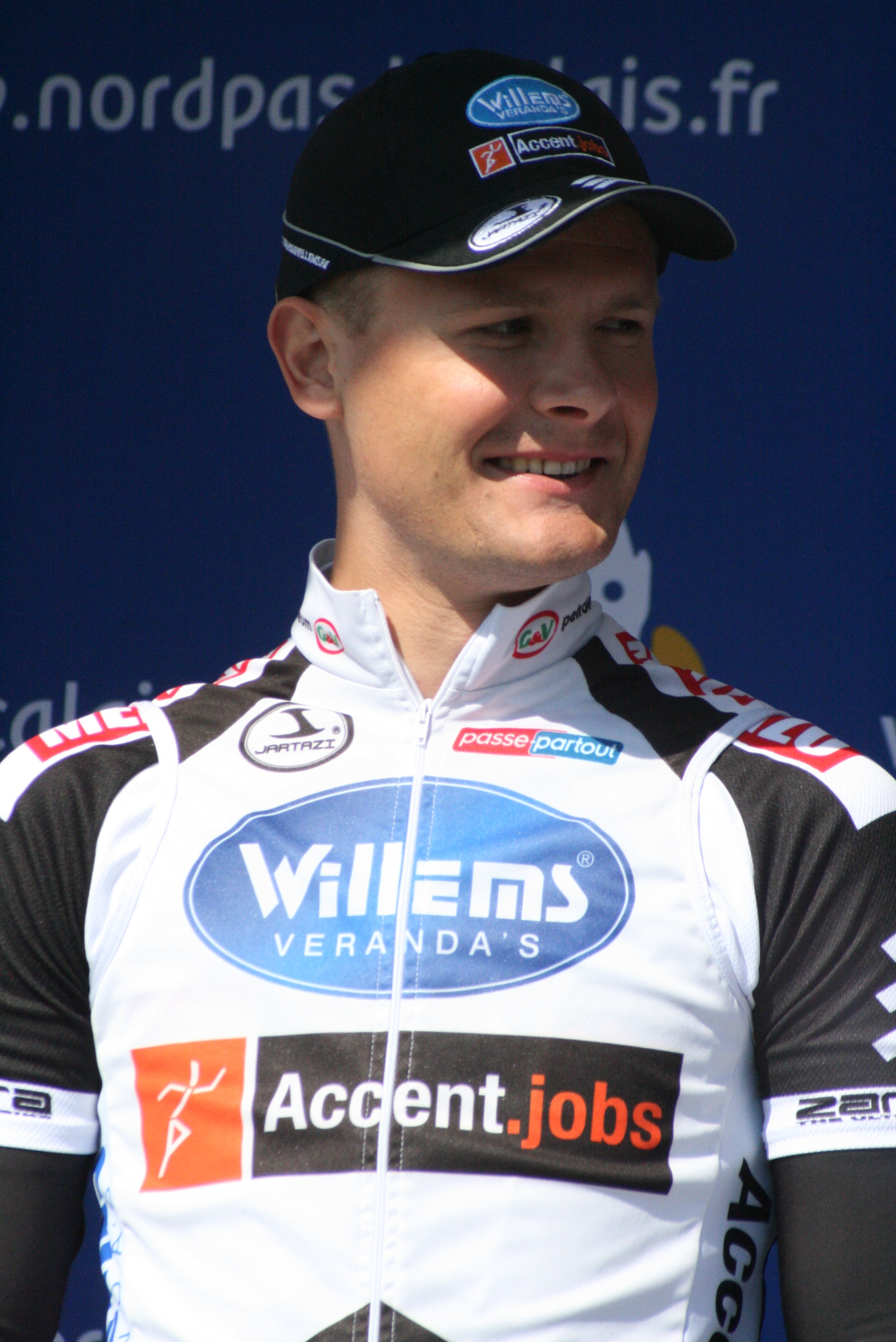
- Caethoven at the 2011 Four Days of Dunkirk.

Personal information
- Full name: Steven Caethoven
- Born: 9 May 1981 (age 45) Ghent, Belgium

Cycling career
- Sport: Cycling
- Discipline: Road
- Role: Rider

Amateur teams
- 2001: Beveren 2000
- 2002: Lotto–Adecco (stagiaire)
- 2003: ABX Go Pass Slagino
- 2003: Vlaanderen–T Interim (stagiaire)
- 2014: Decock-Woningbouw Vandekerkhove

Professional teams
- 2004–2007: Vlaanderen–T Interim
- 2008–2009: Agritubel
- 2010: Landbouwkrediet
- 2011–2013: Veranda's Willems–Accent

Steven Caethoven (born 9 May 1981) is a Belgian former professional road bicycle racer.

After ten seasons competing professionally, Caethoven returned to the amateur ranks in 2014 with the Decock-Woningbouw Vandekerkhove squad.

== Major results ==
2004
1st Brussel–Ingooigem
1st Stage 4 Regio-Tour
1st Stage 3 Tour de l'Avenir
2004
1st Stage 1 Sachsen Tour
3rd Omloop van het Houtland
2006
1st Stage 5 Rheinland-Pfalz Rundfahrt
2007
1st Stage 2 Tour Down Under
2008
1st Stage 6 Tour de Normandie
2009
3rd Paris–Troyes
10th Overall Tour de Normandie

1st Stage 2

2010
2nd Grote 1-MeiPrijs
2011
1st Stage 2 Delta Tour Zeeland
2012
1st Grote Prijs Jef Scherens
2nd De Vlaamse Pijl
2013
1st Ruddervoorde Koerse
1st Sprints classification Route du Sud
4th Ronde van Limburg
4th Grote Prijs Wase Polders

2021
3rd LWU B Knesselare
