= Kevyn Ista =

Belgian road bicycle racer

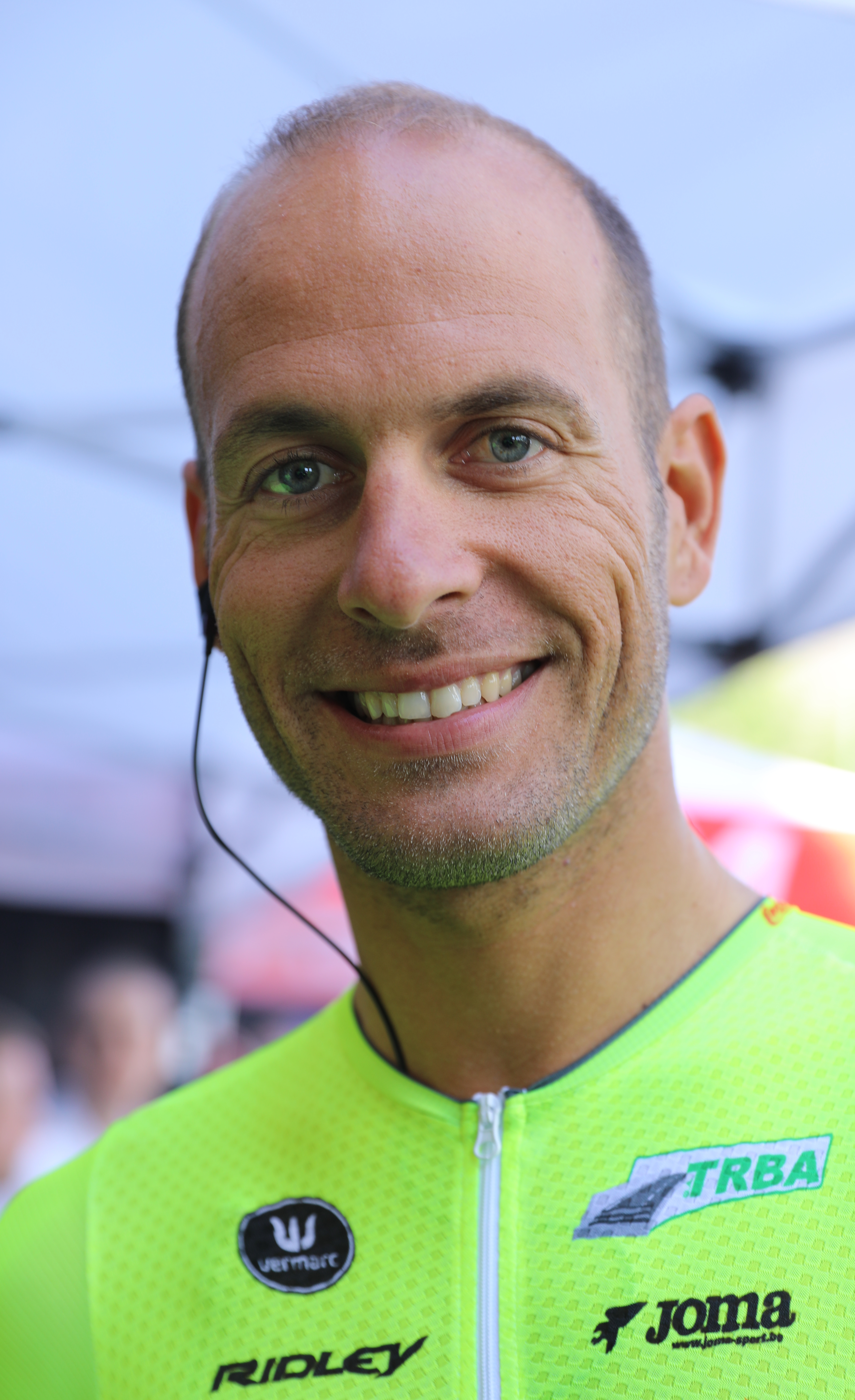
- Ista in 2019

Personal information
- Full name: Kevyn Ista
- Born: 22 November 1984 (age 41) Auvelais, Belgium
- Height: 1.83 m (6 ft 0 in)
- Weight: 70 kg (154 lb)

Cycling career
- Sport: Cycling
- Current team: Bingoal WB Devo Team
- Discipline: Road
- Role: Rider (retired); Directeur sportif

Amateur teams
- 1999–2001: ACC Bodart
- 2002–2003: Wielerteam Affligem
- 2004: Team Storez Vz Ath

Professional teams
- 2005: R.A.G.T. Semences
- 2006: Vélo-Club La Pomme Marseille
- 2006–2007: Pôle Continental Wallon–Bergasol–Euro Millions
- 2008–2009: Agritubel
- 2010–2011: Cofidis
- 2012: Accent.jobs–Willems Veranda's
- 2013–2014: IAM Cycling
- 2015–2020: Wallonie-Bruxelles

Managerial team
- 2021–: Bingoal WB Development Team

Major wins
- Route Adélie (2008)

Kevyn Ista (born 22 November 1984) is a Belgian former professional road bicycle racer, who rode professionally between 2005 and 2020, for eight different teams. He now works as a directeur sportif for UCI Continental team Bingoal WB Devo Team.

== Major results ==
2004
1st Stage 4 Tour de la province de Namur
2005
6th Bordeaux–Saintes
7th Brussels–Ingooigem
2006
1st Ronde van Vlaanderen U23
2007
1st Zellik–Galmaarden
1st Stage 2 Tour de la province de Namur
2nd Overall Drie Zustersteden
3rd Overall Le Triptyque des Monts et Châteaux
4th Vlaamse Havenpijl
7th Kattekoers
7th Grand Prix de Wallonie
2008
1st Route Adélie
2nd Overall Tour du Poitou-Charentes
2nd Le Samyn
5th Les Boucles du Sud-Ardèche
8th Paris–Bruxelles
10th Grand Prix Pino Cerami
2009
1st Stage 3 Tour Méditerranéen
2nd Overall Driedaagse van West-Vlaanderen
2nd Omloop Het Nieuwsblad
4th Cholet-Pays de Loire
2010
5th Grand Prix d'Isbergues
6th Cholet-Pays de Loire
6th Grand Prix de la Somme
7th Grand Prix de Wallonie
9th Trofeo Cala Millor
2011
2nd Le Samyn
2012
2nd Grand Prix Impanis-Van Petegem
6th Gooikse Pijl
8th Overall Tour de Wallonie
9th Overall Tour of Norway
10th Halle–Ingooigem
2015
3rd Grand Prix de la ville de Nogent-sur-Oise
5th Schaal Sels
8th Circuit de Wallonie
2016
5th Polynormande
6th Druivenkoers Overijse
7th Grand Prix Impanis-Van Petegem
8th De Kustpijl
10th Overall Ronde van Midden-Nederland
10th Brussels Cycling Classic
2017
6th Gooikse Pijl
7th Overall Circuit des Ardennes
8th Dwars door de Vlaamse Ardennen
2018
5th Grote Prijs Stad Zottegem
5th Schaal Sels
7th Halle–Ingooigem
7th Internationale Wielertrofee Jong Maar Moedig
9th Omloop van het Houtland
2019
9th Paris–Tours
