= 2009 Omloop Het Nieuwsblad =

Race details
- Dates: 28 February
- Stages: 1
- Distance: 204.5 km (127.1 mi)
- Winning time: 4h 47' 45

Results
	Winner	Thor Hushovd (NOR)	(Cervélo TestTeam)
	Second	Kevin Ista (BEL)	(Agritubel)
	Third	Juan Antonio Flecha (ESP)	(Rabobank)

The 2009 Omloop Het Nieuwsblad cycle race took place on 28 February 2009. It was the 64th edition of the international classic Omloop Het Nieuwsblad, and the first time after the name changed from Omloop Het Volk. The race was won by Thor Hushovd in an 18-man sprint in Ghent, ahead of Kevyn Ista and Juan Antonio Flecha.

== Results ==
Result
Rank	Rider	Team	Time
1	Thor Hushovd (NOR)	Cervélo TestTeam	4h 47' 45"
2	Kevyn Ista (BEL)	Agritubel	+ 0"
3	Juan Antonio Flecha (ESP)	Rabobank	+ 0"
4	Greg Van Avermaet (BEL)	Silence–Lotto	+ 0"
5	Marcus Burghardt (GER)	Team Columbia–High Road	+ 0"
6	Frédéric Amorison (BEL)	Landbouwkrediet–Colnago	+ 0"
7	Andreas Klier (GER)	Cervélo TestTeam	+ 0"
8	Heinrich Haussler (GER)	Cervélo TestTeam	+ 0"
9	Niki Terpstra (NED)	Team Milram	+ 0"
10	Tom Boonen (BEL)	Quick-Step	+ 0"
