= 2008 Omloop Het Volk =

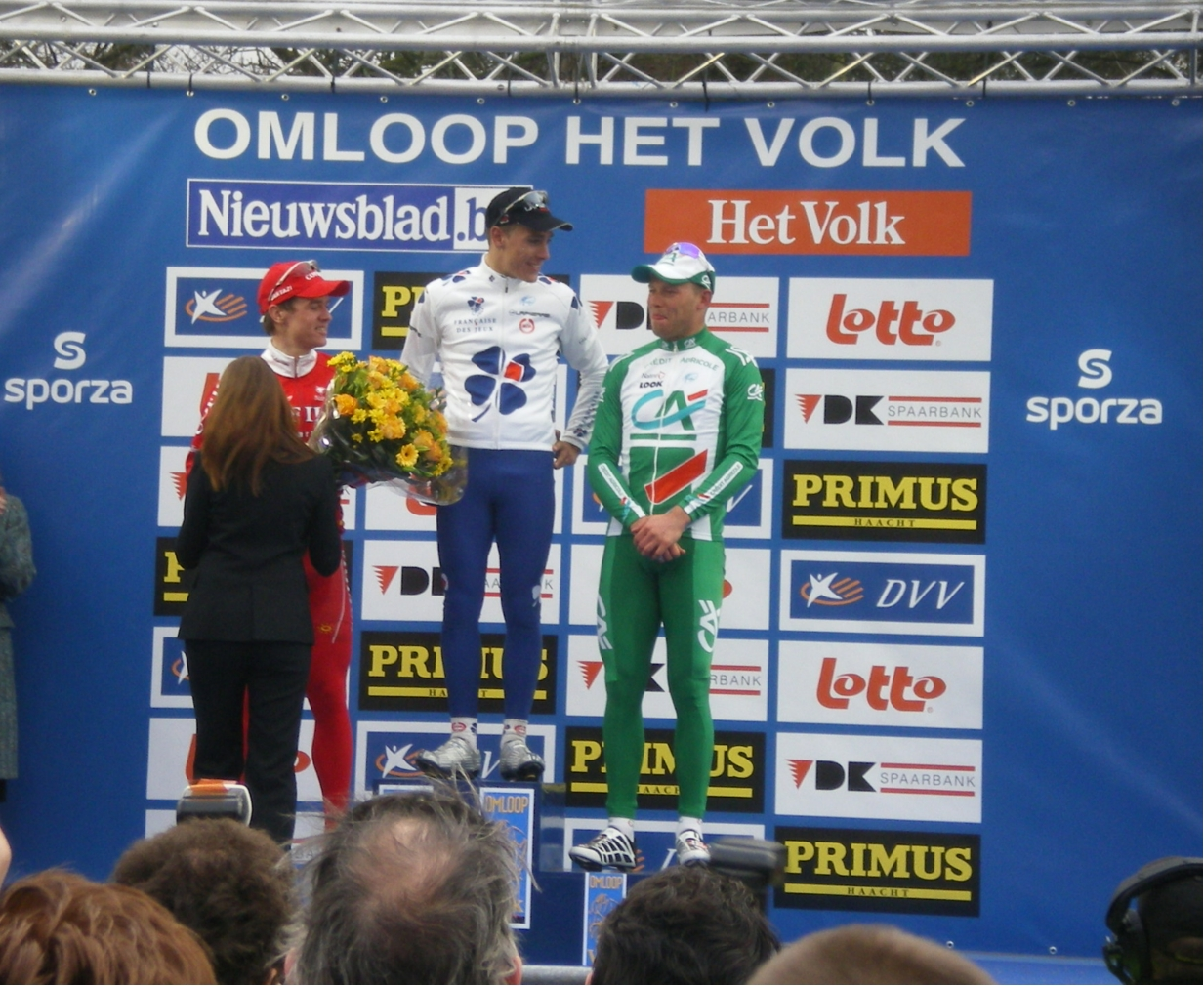
- Nick Nuyens, Philippe Gilbert and Thor Hushovd on the podium

Race details
- Dates: 1 March 2008
- Stages: 1
- Distance: 199 km (124 mi)
- Winning time: 4h 55' 25"

Results
	Winner	Philippe Gilbert (BEL)	(Française des Jeux)
	Second	Nick Nuyens (BEL)	(Cofidis)
	Third	Thor Hushovd (NOR)	(Crédit Agricole)

The 64th edition of the Omloop Het volk was held on 1 March 2008. The race was won by Philippe Gilbert after a 50 km solo breakaway.

Gilbert broke clear from the splintered peloton on the Eikenberg, with 50 km and two climbs to go, and held off the chasing group on the flat run-in towards the finish in Ghent. Nick Nuyens won the sprint for second place ahead of Thor Hushovd at one minute from Gilbert.

== Results ==
Result
Rank	Rider	Team	Time
1	Philippe Gilbert (BEL)	Française des Jeux	4h 55' 25"
2	Nick Nuyens (BEL)	Cofidis	+ 58"
3	Thor Hushovd (NOR)	Crédit Agricole	+ 1' 06"
4	Yuriy Krivtsov (UKR)	Ag2r–La Mondiale	+ 1' 06"
5	Aleksandr Kuschynski (BLR)	Liquigas	+ 1' 12"
6	Nicolas Jalabert (FRA)	Agritubel	+ 1' 13"
7	Leif Hoste (BEL)	Silence–Lotto	+ 1' 13"
8	Allan Johansen (DEN)	Team CSC	+ 1' 16"
9	Jan Kuyckx (BEL)	Landbouwkrediet–Tönissteiner	+ 1' 53"
10	Arnaud Gérard (FRA)	Française des Jeux	+ 1' 53"

== Gallery ==
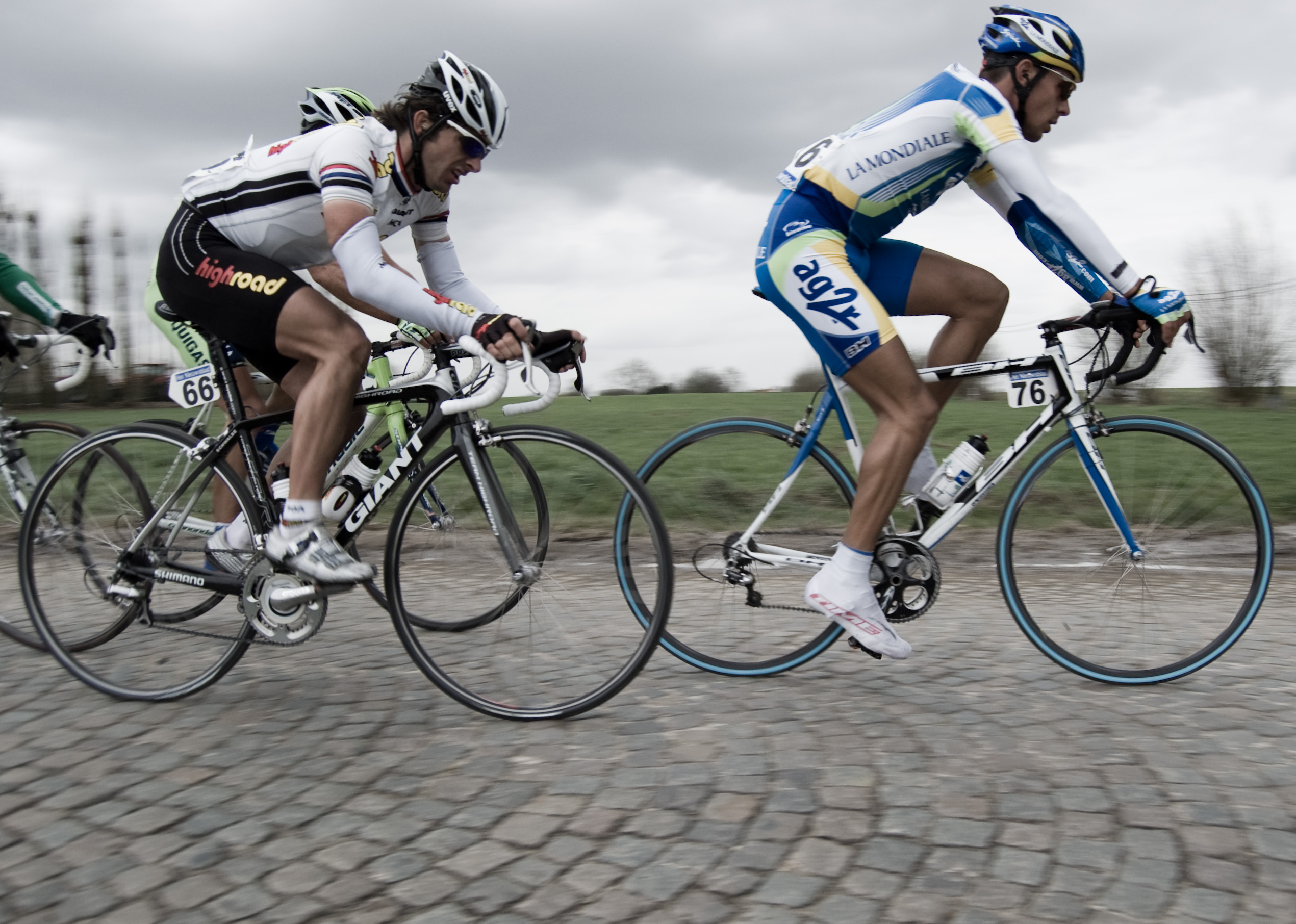
Servais Knaven and Stéphane Poulhies on the Lange Munte cobbles

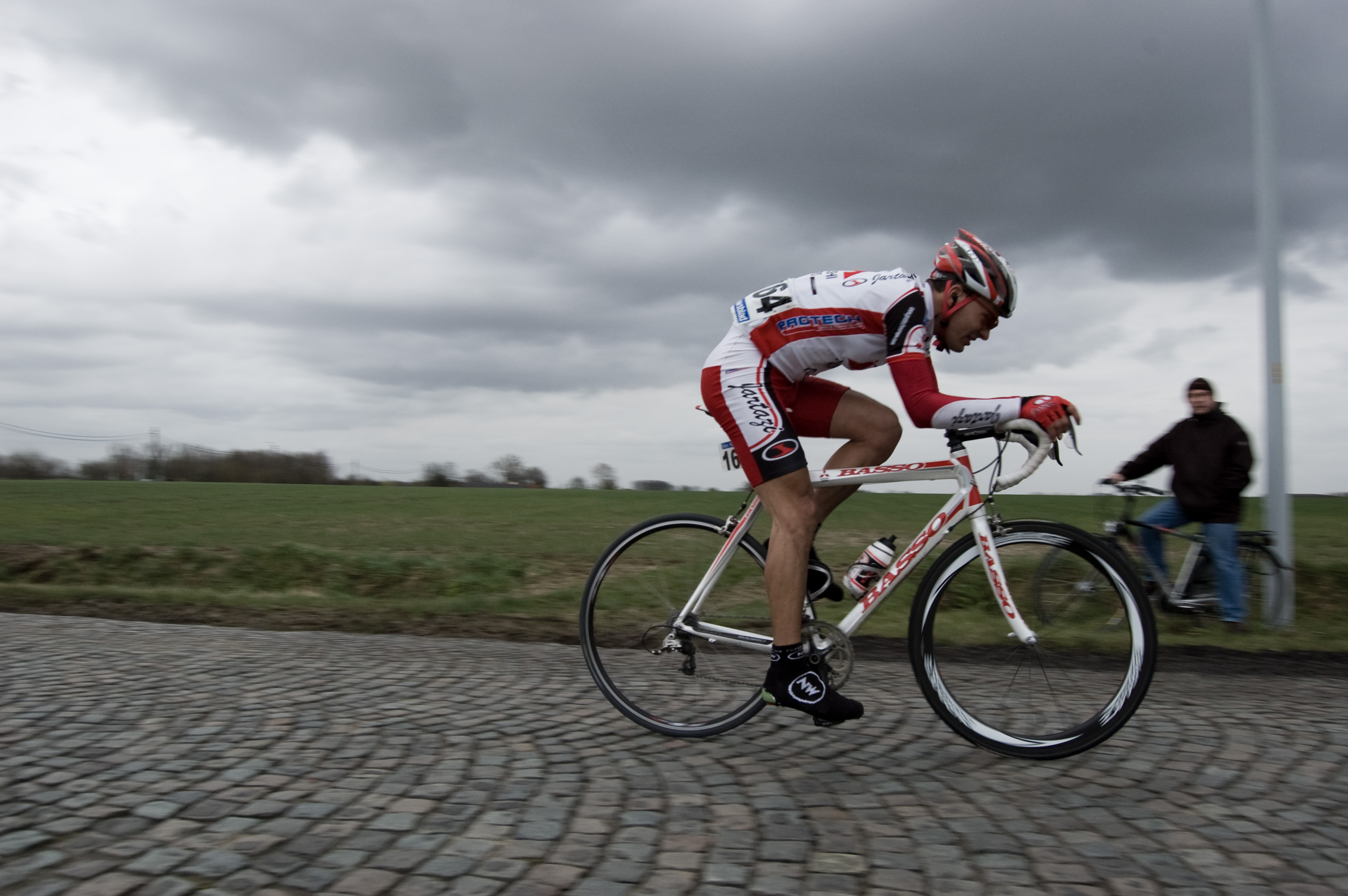
Vytautas Kaupas on the Lange Munte cobbles

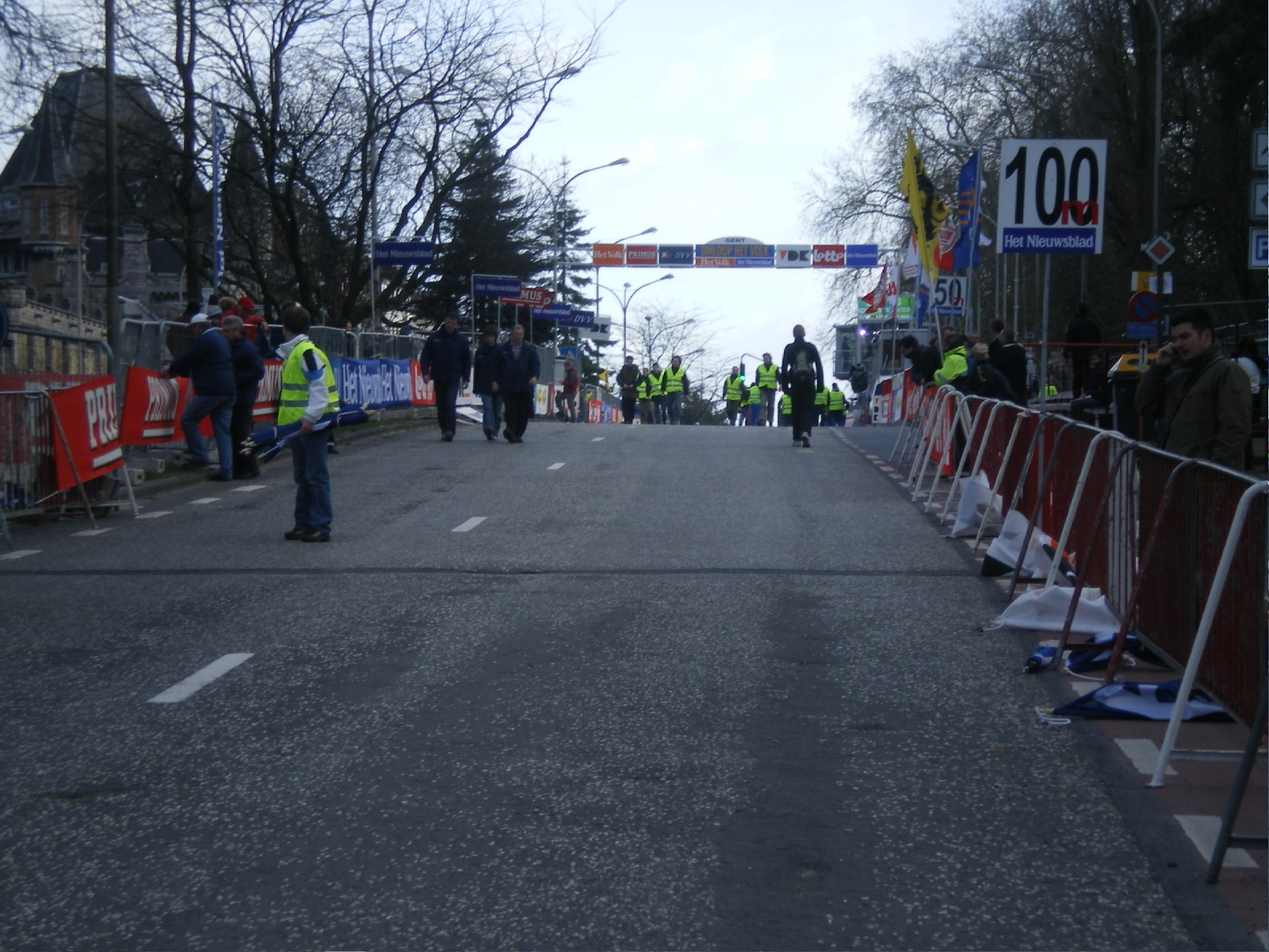
Finishing straight
