= Zellik–Galmaarden =

Race details
- Date: Mid April
- Region: Flanders, Belgium
- English name: Zellik–Galmaarden
- Local name(s): Zellik-Galmaarden (in Dutch)
- Discipline: Road
- Competition: UCI Europe Tour
- Type: One-day race

History
- First edition: 1983
- Editions: 30 (as of 2012)
- First winner: Frank Verleyen (BEL)
- Most recent: Kevin Thome (BEL)

Zellik–Galmaarden is a European single day cycle race held in the Belgian region of Flanders. As of 2011, the race is organized as a 1.2 event on the UCI Europe Tour.

== Winners ==
Year	Country	Rider	Team
1983	Belgium	Frank Verleyen	
1984	Belgium	Stefan Aerts	
1985	Belgium	Rudy Brusselmans	
1986	Belgium	Rudy van der Haegen	
1987	Belgium	Jean-Pierre Valepijn	
1988	Belgium	Eric De Clercq	
1989	Belgium	Patrick van den Houwe	
1990	Soviet Union	Igor Patenko	
1991	Belgium	Mario Liboton	
1992	Belgium	Wim Omloop	
1993	Belgium	Wim Feys	
1994	Denmark	Frank Høj	
1995	Belgium	Andy De Smet	
1996	Belgium	Nico Eeckhout	Collstrop-Lystex
1997	Belgium	Ludo Dierckxsens	Tönissteiner-Colnago
1998	Belgium	Kris Gerits	Vlaanderen 2002-Eddy Merckx
1999	Belgium	Joran Keppens	Tönissteiner-Colnago
2000	Kazakhstan	Dmitry Fofonov	Besson Chaussures
2001	Belgium	Tom Boonen	Kortrijk Groeninge Spurters
2002	Belgium	Johan Vansummeren	Domo-Latexco Retie
2003	Belgium	Jurgen Van Den Broeck	Quick Step-Davitamon-Latexco
2004	Belgium	Jurgen Vermeersch	Cerdi Team
2005	Belgium	Stijn Ennekens	Amuzza.com-Davo
2006	Belgium	Greg Van Avermaet	Bodysol-Win for Life-Jong Vlaanderen
2007	Belgium	Kevyn Ista	Pôle Continental Wallon-Bodysol-Euromillions
2008	Belgium	Bert De Backer	Beveren 2000
2009	Belgium	Jonas Vangenechten	Verandas Willems
2010	Netherlands	Coen Vermeltfoort	Rabobank Continental Team
2011	Belgium	Gaëtan Bille	Wallonie Bruxelles–Crédit Agricole
2012	Belgium	Kevin Thome	Wallonie Bruxelles–Crédit Agricole
