= Kris Gerits =

Belgian cyclist

Personal information
- Full name: Kris Gerits
- Born: 27 September 1971 (age 55) Hasselt, Belgium

Cycling career
- Sport: Cycling
- Current team: Retired
- Discipline: Road
- Role: Rider

Professional team
- 1994–2002: Vlaanderen

Major wins
- Le Samyn (2001)

Kris Gerits (born 27 September 1971 in Hasselt) is a Belgian former professional road racing cyclist. He was professional from 1994 until 2002, spending all his career with just one team, Vlaanderen.

== Palmarès ==
1997
Circuit Franco-Belge, 1 stage
1998
Zellik–Galmaarden
Omloop van de Westkust De Panne
Circuit Franco-Belge, 1 stage
Tienen Criterium
1999
Bayern Rundfahrt, 1 stage
Eurode Omloop
2001
Le Samyn
