= Geoffrey Demeyere =

Belgian bicycle racer (born 1976)

Personal information
- Born: 31 October 1976 (age 49) Roeselare, Belgium

Cycling career
- Sport: Cycling
- Current team: Retires
- Discipline: Road
- Role: Rider

Amateur teams
- 2006: New Heebra
- 2008: Lispanne De Haan
- 2009–2011: Wieler Decock–Capino Moorsele
- 2012: Douchy–Thalassa

Professional team
- 2000–2004: Vlaanderen 2002–Eddy Merckx

Geoffrey Demeyere (born 31 October 1976 in Roeselare) is a Belgian former road cyclist, who competed as a professional from 2000 to 2004.

== Major results ==
1998
2nd Overall Triptyque des Monts et Châteaux
2nd Paris–Roubaix Espoirs
3rd Grand Prix de Waregem
1999
1st Overall Tour de la province de Namur

1st Stage 2

3rd Internatie Reningelst
2001
5th Grand Prix d'Isbergues
2002
1st Stage 2 Circuito Montañes
2nd Druivenkoers-Overijse
2003
7th Rund um die Hainleite-Erfurt
10th Overall Deutschland Tour
2004
1st Schaal Sels
2nd Druivenkoers-Overijse
2005
2nd Overall Tweedaagse van de Gaverstreek

1st Stage 3

2006
1st Grand Prix Etienne De Wilde
1st Stage 3 Tour de Liège
2007
3rd Overall Tour de la province de Namur
2008
3rd Internatie Reningelst
