= Bordeaux–Saintes =

One-day road cycling race in France

Race details
- Date: March
- Region: France
- Discipline: Road
- Competition: National calendar
- Type: One-day race
- Organiser: Bordeaux-Saintes Cycliste Organisations
- Web site: www.bordeaux-saintes.fr

History
- First edition: 1909
- Editions: 87 (as of 2025)
- First winner: Ernest Milleroux (FRA)
- Most wins: Fernand Delort (FRA); Marc Gomez (FRA); (2 wins)
- Most recent: Mickaël Guichard (FRA)

Bordeaux–Saintes is a one-day road cycling race that takes place between the cities of Bordeaux and Saintes, France. The race was first held in 1909 and has been reserved for amateurs since 1969. In 2005, it was held as a 1.2 event on the UCI Europe Tour.

== Winners ==
Year	Winner	Second	Third
1909	(France) Ernest Milleroux	(France) Paul Hostein	(France) Régis de Lavlette
1910–1932	No race		
1933	(France) André Gaillot	(France) Emile Sainte-Marie	(France) Jean-Baptiste Intcegaray
1934	(France) Ernest Terreau	(France) Jean-Baptiste Intcegaray	(France) Georges Lachat
1935	(France) Robert Béliard	(France) Emile Clergeau	(France) Gabriel Hargues
1936	(Netherlands) Albert Van Schendel	(Switzerland) Robert Gygi	(France) Robert Béliard
1937	(France) Sylvain Marcaillou	(France) Roger Pieteraerents	(France) Raymond Goubault
1938	(France) André Gaboriaud	(France) Raymond Goubault	(France) Fernand Beaudut
1939	(France) Fernand Beaudut	(France) Jean Taris	(France) Edouard Bouyer
1940–1945	No race		
1946	(France) Antoine Latorre	(France) Joseph Royo	(France) André Bramard
1947	(France) Robert Rippe	(France) Roger Durand	(France) René Paillier
1948	(France) Albert Dolhats	(France) Gérard Villar	(France) Raymond Cosse
1949	(France) Jacques Bebenhut	(France) Albert Joulin	(France) Félix Adriano
1950	(France) Jean Begue	(France) André Labeylie	(France) Guerrino Cassol
1951	(France) André Darrigade	(France) Henri Aubry	(France) Pierre Gaudot
1952	(France) Pierre Gaudot	(France) Gabriel Gaudin	(France) Settimo Perin
1953	(France) Settimo Perin	(Spain) Luis Goya	(Spain) Félix Bermúdez
1954	(France) Maurice Nauleau	(Spain) Luciano Montero	(France) Georges Gay
1955	(France) Jean Dacquay	(France) Jacques Lemaitre	(France) Georges Gay
1956	(France) Gérard Gaillot	(France) André Lesca	(Spain) Luis Goya
1957	(France) André Lesca	(France) Jacques Blanco	(France) Maurice Pele
1958	(France) Maurice Pèle	(France) Alain Lesca	(France) Guy Planas
1959	(France) Robert Verdeun	(France) Daniel Walryck	(France) Albert Dolhats
1960	(France) Raymond Poulidor	(France) Pierre Beuffeuil	(France) Robert Verdeun
1961	(France) Fernand Delord	(France) René Fournier	(France) Raymond Batan
1962	(France) Manuel Manzano	(France) Camille Le Menn	(France) Fernand Delort
1963	(France) Fernand Delort	(France) Michel Gonzales	(France) René Fournier
1964	(France) Pierre Le Mellec	(Spain) José María Errandonea	(France) Jean Arze
1965	(France) Joseph Groussard	(France) Gérard Capdebosq	(France) Michel Brux
1966	(Spain) Domingo Perurena	(France) Raymond Delisle	(France) Maurice Laforest
1967	(France) Raymond Riotte	(France) Francis Campaner	(France) André Zimmermann
1968	(Spain) Gregorio San Miguel	(France) Jean-Marie Leblanc	(France) Michel Périn
1969	(Italy) Renato Rossetto	(Belgium) Yvan Francaux	(France) Jean-Louis Jageneau
1970	(France) Guy Patour	(United Kingdom) Andrew Raven	(France) Marcel Gaffajoli
1971	(France) Claude Magni	(France) Alain Bernard	(France) Claude Chabanel
1972	(France) Christian Ardouin	(France) José Philippe	(France) Jean Gillet
1973	(France) Jacques Bossis	(France) Alain Cigana	(France) Jean-François Mainguenaud
1974	(France) Didier Dupuis	(France) Didier Godet	(France) Jacky Troyard
1975	(France) Didier Bazzo	(France) Alain de Carvalho	(United Kingdom) David Wells
1976	(France) Alain Mercadie	(France) Jackie Hurou	(France) Gérard Simonnot
1977	(France) Didier Lubiato	(France) Jean-Marie Nibeaudeau	(France) Gérard Cigano
1978	(France) Michel Fedrigo	(France) Jean-Marie Corre	(France) Jean-Jacques Szkolnyk
1979	(France) Marc Gomez	(France) Francis Castaing	(France) Michel Fedrigo
1980	(France) Francis Castaing	(France) Bernard Huot	(France) Michel Dufour
1981	(France) Marc Gomez	(France) Yves Beau	(France) Bernard Pineau
1982	(France) Serge Polloni	(France) Francis Perin	(France) Bruno Roussel
1983	(France) Marino Verardo	(France) Serge Polloni	(Canada) Dany Deslongchamp
1984	(France) Jean-Luc Gilbert	(France) Daniel Feudon	(France) René Bajan
1985	(France) Michel Dufour	(France) Charles Turlet	(France) Dominique Lardin
1986	(France) Jean-Pierre Cocquerelle	(France) Jean-Louis Auditeau	(France) Sylvain Le Goff
1987	(France) Patrick Jeremie	(France) Thierry Gault	(France) Claude Aigueparses
1988	(France) Michel Larpe	(France) André Becaas	(France) Gilles Guegan
1989	(France) Gérard Simonnot	(France) Christian Jany	(France) Thomas Davy
1990	(France) Thierry Dupuy	(France) Christophe Capelle	(France) Laurent Desbiens
1991	(France) Sylvain Bolay	(France) Thierry Bricaud	(Poland) Zbigniew Ludwiniak
1992	(Poland) Marek Swiniaski	(France) Xavier Vadrot	(France) Thierry Ferrer
1993	(France) Pascal Deramé	(France) Jean-François Anti	(France) Christophe Allin
1994	(France) Laurent Drouin	(France) Christophe Faudot	(France) Christian Guiberteau
1995	(France) Christophe Agnolutto	(France) Jean-Philippe Rouxel	(France) Jean-Philippe Duracka
1996	(France) Éric Drubay	(France) Jean-Philippe Duracka	(France) Christophe Faudot
1997	(France) Olivier Perraudeau	(France) Pierre Painaud	(France) Christopher Jenner
1998	(France) Dominique Péré	(France) Jean-Philippe Duracka	(France) Vincent Marchais
1999	(France) Frédéric Mainguenaud	(France) Éric Drubay	(France) Bruno Thibout
2000	(France) Eric Duteil	(France) Frédéric Delalande	(France) Jérôme Desjardins
2001	(France) Bertrand Guerry	(France) Christian Magimel	(France) Christophe Laurent
2002	(Estonia) Erki Pütsep	(Italy) Carlo Meneghetti	(Japan) Shinishi Fukushima
2003	(France) Alexandre Naulleau	(France) Christophe Diguet	(France) Sylvain Lavergne
2004	(France) Anthony Ravard	(France) Ludovic Auger	(France) Stéphane Barthe
2005	(Sweden) John Nilsson	(France) Denis Robin	(France) Jérôme Bonnace
2006	(France) Cédric Barre	(France) Mickael Larpe	(Estonia) Tarmo Raudsepp
2007	(Russia) Evgueni Sokolov	(France) Damien Gaudin	(France) Yoann Offredo
2008	(Latvia) Gatis Smukulis	(Australia) David Tanner	(France) Yannick Marie
2009	(France) Yoann Bagot	(France) Jean-Lou Paiani	(France) Jérémie Dérangère
2010	(France) Adrien Petit	(France) Rudy Lesschaeve	(France) Etienne Pieret
2011	(Russia) Matvey Zubov	(France) Sylvain Déchereux	(France) Sylvain Blanquefort
2012	(France) Rudy Kowalski	(Estonia) Alo Jakin	(France) Johann Rigoulay
2013	(France) Yann Guyot	(France) Benoît Sinner	(France) Rudy Barbier
2014	(France) Alexis Bodiot	(France) Ronan Racault	(France) Camille Thominet
2015	(France) Bryan Alaphilippe	(France) Jordan Levasseur	(France) Yoän Vérardo
2016	(France) Alexandre Paccalet	(France) Yoän Vérardo	(France) Simon Sellier
2017	(Lithuania) Žydrūnas Savickas	(France) Aurélien Daniel	(France) Fabio Do Rego
2018	(France) Jimmy Raibaud	(France) Mathieu Burgaudeau	(Luxembourg) Kevin Geniets
2019	(France) Mickaël Guichard	(France) Jérémy Cabot	(France) Alexandre Delettre
2020	(France) Thomas Acosta	(France) Dany Maffeïs	(France) Mickaël Larpe
2021	(France) Sandy Dujardin	(France) Jean Goubert	(France) Thomas Acosta
2022	(France) Kévin Boyer	(France) Loïck Dussol	(France) Fabien Schmidt
2023	No winner; race neutralized		
2024	(France) Gauthier Navarro	(France) Maxime Renault	(France) Alan Moulin
2025	(France) Mickaël Guichard	(France) Antonin Boissière	(France) Gauthier Navarro
