= Morten Hulgaard =

Danish cyclist

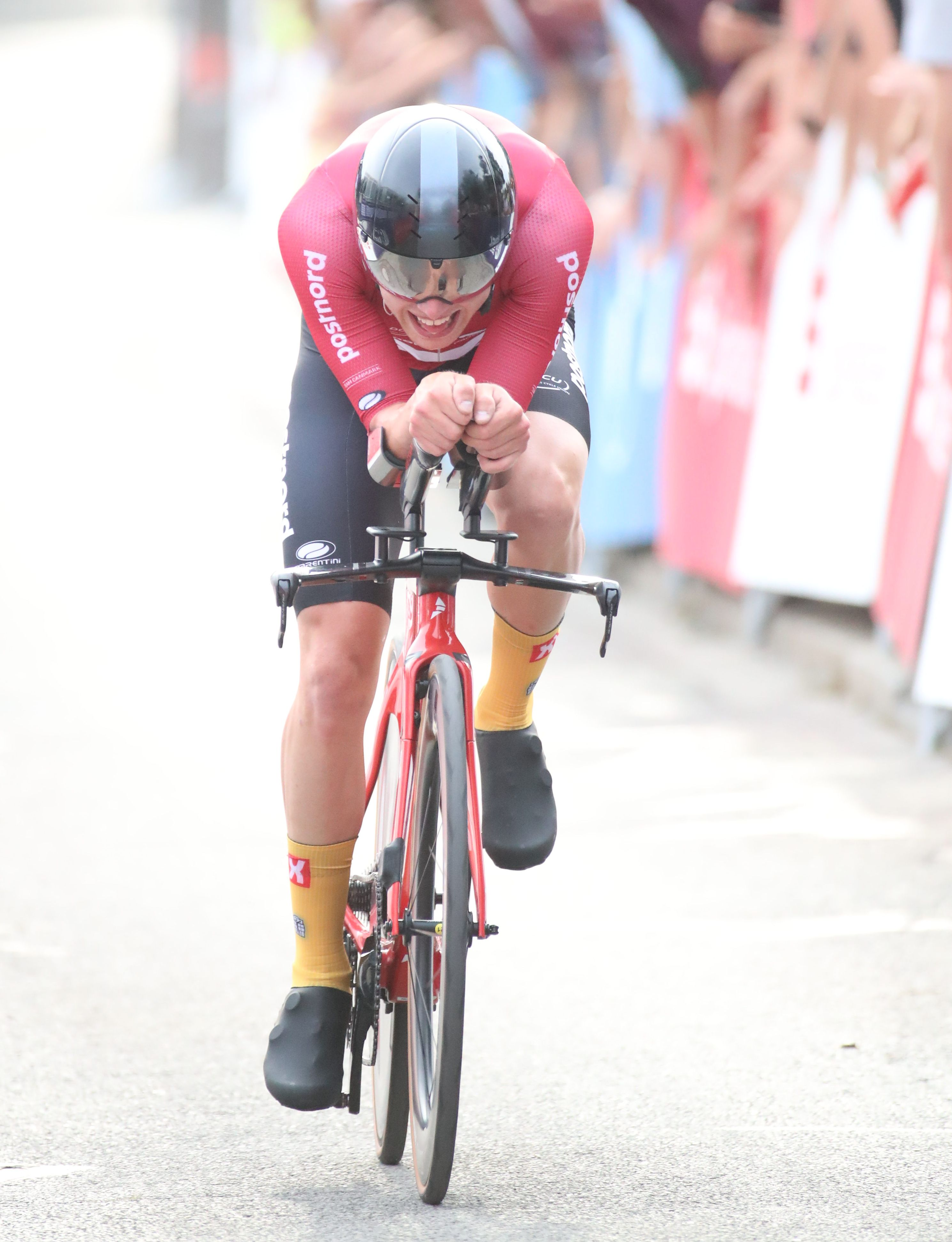

Personal information
- Full name: Morten Alexander Hulgaard
- Born: 23 August 1998 (age 28)
- Height: 1.81 m (5 ft 11 in)
- Weight: 73 kg (161 lb)

Cycling career
- Sport: Cycling
- Current team: Retired
- Discipline: Road
- Role: Rider

Professional teams
- 2017–2018: BHS–Almeborg Bornholm
- 2019: Team ColoQuick
- 2020–2022: Uno-X Norwegian Development Team

Morten Alexander Hulgaard (born 23 August 1998) is a Danish former cyclist, who competed as a professional from 2017 to 2022.

== Major results ==
2016
National Junior Road Championships

2nd Road race
3rd Time trial

2nd Overall Internationale Cottbuser Junioren-Etappenfahrt
5th Overall Tour de l'Abitibi
2017
2nd Kernen Omloop Echt-Susteren
9th Duo Normand
9th Eschborn–Frankfurt Under-23
2018
6th Lillehammer GP
7th Gylne Gutuer
9th Hafjell GP
2019
Tour de la Mirabelle

1st Points classification
1st Stage 1a

2nd Gylne Gutuer
6th Time trial, UCI Road World Under-23 Championships
6th Hafjell GP
2020
1st Stage 1 (TTT) Giro del Friuli-Venezia Giulia
4th Time trial, National Under-23 Road Championships
4th Overall Bałtyk–Karkonosze Tour

1st Young rider classification

6th Il Piccolo Lombardia
2021
3rd Overall Tour Poitou-Charentes en Nouvelle-Aquitaine

1st Young rider classification

3rd Münsterland Giro
4th Overall Kreiz Breizh Elites
2022
5th Time trial, National Road Championships
8th Time trial, UEC European Road Championships
