= 2015 Danmark Rundt =

2015 UCI Europe Tour
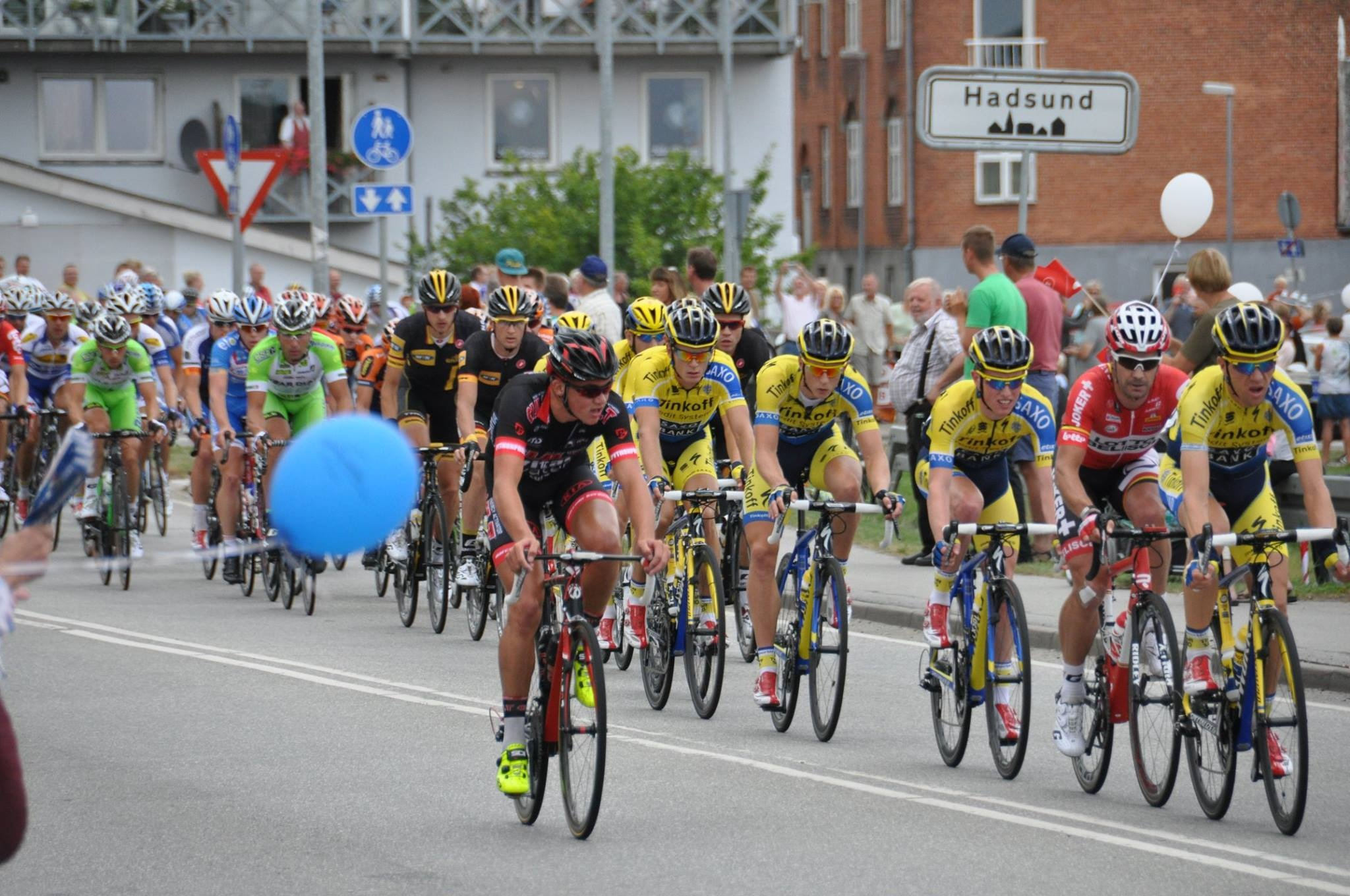
- Post Danmark Rundt 2014 in Hadsund

Race details
- Dates: 4–8 August 2015
- Stages: 6
- Distance: 878.3 km (545.8 mi)
- Winning time: 19h 42' 19"

Results
Jersey awarded to the overall winner	Winner	Christopher Juul-Jensen (DEN)	(Tinkoff–Saxo)
	Second	Lars Bak (DEN)	(Lotto–Soudal)
	Third	Marco Marcato (ITA)	(Wanty–Groupe Gobert)
Jersey awarded to the points classification winner	Points	Matti Breschel (DEN)	(Tinkoff–Saxo)
Jersey awarded to the mountains classification winner	Mountains	Pim Ligthart (NED)	(Lotto–Soudal)
Jersey awarded to the youth classification winner	Youth	Mads Würtz Schmidt (DEN)	(ColoQuick)
	Team	Tinkoff–Saxo	

The 2015 Danmark Rundt was a men's road bicycle race which was held from 4 August to 8 August 2015. It was the 25th edition of the stage race, which was established in 1985. The race was rated as a 2.HC event and formed part of the 2015 UCI Europe Tour. The race was made up of six stages over five days and includes an individual time trial. The race was won by Christopher Juul-Jensen of Tinkoff–Saxo.

== Teams ==
A total of 18 teams with 8 riders each raced in the 2015 Danmark Rundt: 4 UCI ProTeams, 9 UCI Professional Continental Teams, 4 UCI Continental Teams along with a Danish national team under the Team Post Danmark name.

World Tour teams

- Astana
- Lotto–Soudal
- Tinkoff–Saxo
- Team Sky

Professional Continental teams

- Bardiani–CSF
- Bora–Argon 18
- Cult Energy Pro Cycling
- Team Europcar
- MTN–Qhubeka
- Team Roompot
- Team Novo Nordisk
- Topsport Vlaanderen–Baloise
- Wanty–Groupe Gobert

Continental teams

- Team Almeborg–Bornholm
- Team ColoQuick
- Riwal Platform
- Team TreFor-Blue Water

National team

- Team Post Danmark

== Schedule ==
There were six stages over five days with both a short mass start and individual time trial on day four.

Stage	Date	Route	Distance (km)	Type	Winner
1	4 August	Struer-Holstebro	180	Flat stage	Lars Boom (NED)
2	5 August	Ringkøbing-Aarhus	235	Flat stage	Edvald Boasson Hagen (NOR)
3	6 August	Vejle-Vejle	185	Flat stage	Matti Breschel (DEN)
4	7 August	Slagelse-Frederiksværk	115	Flat stage	Matti Breschel (DEN)
5	7 August	Helsingør	13.6	Individual time trial	Mads Würtz Schmidt (DEN)
6	8 August	Hillerød-Frederiksberg	150	Flat stage	Michael Mørkøv (DEN)

== Classification leadership ==
Stage	Winner	General classification	Points classification	Mountains classification	Young rider classification	Team classification
1	Lars Boom	Lars Boom	Lars Boom	Pim Ligthart	Mads Pedersen	Astana
2	Edvald Boasson Hagen	Lars Boom	Lars Boom	Mathias Westergaard	Mads Pedersen	Astana
3	Matti Breschel	Lars Bak	Marco Marcato	Patrick Clausen	Alexander Kamp	Tinkoff–Saxo
4	Matti Breschel	Lars Bak	Matti Breschel	Patrick Clausen	Alexander Kamp	Tinkoff–Saxo
5	Mads Würtz Schmidt	Christopher Juul-Jensen	Matti Breschel	Patrick Clausen	Mads Würtz Schmidt	Tinkoff–Saxo
6	Michael Mørkøv	Christopher Juul-Jensen	Matti Breschel	Pim Ligthart	Mads Würtz Schmidt	Tinkoff–Saxo
Final		Christopher Juul-Jensen	Matti Breschel	Pim Ligthart	Mads Würtz Schmidt	Tinkoff–Saxo

== Final standings ==
Legend
Gold jersey	Denotes the leader of the General classification	White jersey	Denotes the leader of the Young rider classification
Blue jersey	Denotes the leader of the Points classification	Blue dotted jersey	Denotes the leader of the Mountains classification

=== General classification ===
	Rider	Team	Time
1	Christopher Juul-Jensen (DEN)	Tinkoff–Saxo	19h 42' 19"
2	Lars Bak (DEN)	Lotto–Soudal	+ 45"
3	Marco Marcato (ITA)	Wanty–Groupe Gobert	+ 49"
4	Rasmus Guldhammer (DEN)	Cult Energy Pro Cycling	+ 1' 00"
5	Patrick Konrad (AUT)	Bora–Argon 18	+ 1' 04"
6	Edvald Boasson Hagen (NOR)	MTN–Qhubeka	+ 1' 19"
7	Mads Würtz Schmidt (DEN)	Team ColoQuick	+ 1' 26"
8	Matti Breschel (DEN)	Tinkoff–Saxo	+ 1' 26"
9	Alexander Kamp (DEN)	ColoQuick	+ 1' 30"
10	Magnus Cort (DEN)	Denmark	+ 1' 54"

=== Young riders classification (U23) ===
	Rider	Team	Points
1	Mads Würtz Schmidt (DEN)	ColoQuick	19h 43' 45"
2	Alexander Kamp (DEN)	ColoQuick	+ 4"
3	Magnus Cort (DEN)	Denmark	+ 28"
4	Sebastián Henao (COL)	Team Sky	+ 1' 04"
5	Michael Gogl (AUT)	Tinkoff–Saxo	+ 9' 47"
6	Søren Kragh Andersen (DEN)	Team TreFor–Blue Water	+ 11' 27"
7	Martin Grøn (DEN)	Riwal Platform	+ 12' 26"
8	Cristoffer Lisson (DEN)	Team Almeborg-Bornholm	+ 14' 26"
9	Amaury Capiot (BEL)	Topsport Vlaanderen–Baloise	+ 14' 29"
10	Nikolaj Steen Moltke (DEN)	Denmark	+ 14' 52"

=== Points classification ===
	Rider	Team	Points
1	Matti Breschel (DEN)	Tinkoff–Saxo	51
2	Edvald Boasson Hagen (NOR)	MTN–Qhubeka	45
3	Marco Marcato (ITA)	Wanty-Groupe Gobert	38
4	Christopher Juul-Jensen (DEN)	Tinkoff–Saxo	32
5	Asbjørn Kragh Andersen (DEN)	Team TreFor–Blue Water	23

=== Mountains classification ===
	Rider	Team	Points
1	Pim Ligthart (NED)	Lotto–Soudal	46
2	Patrick Clausen (DEN)	Team TreFor–Blue Water	38
3	Brian van Goethem (NED)	Team Roompot	30
4	Mathias Westergaard (DEN)	Team Almeborg-Bornholm	24
5	Jonas Aaen Jørgensen (DEN)	Riwal Platform	22

=== Team classification ===
Pos.	Team	Time
1	Tinkoff–Saxo	59h 09' 54"
2	Lotto–Soudal	+ 2' 48"
3	Team Sky	+ 5' 49"
4	MTN–Qhubeka	+ 7' 41"
5	Cult Energy Pro Cycling	+ 7' 58"
