= 2016 UCI Road World Championships – Men's time trial =

Men's time trial
2016 UCI Road World Championships
- Time trial Rainbow jersey

Race details
- Dates: 12 October 2016
- Stages: 1
- Distance: 40 km (24.85 mi)
- Winning time: 44' 42.99"

Medalists
	Gold	Tony Martin (Germany)
	Silver	Vasil Kiryienka (Belarus)
	Bronze	Jonathan Castroviejo (Spain)

The Men's time trial of the 2016 UCI Road World Championships was a cycling event that took place on 12 October 2016 in Doha, Qatar. It was the 23rd edition of the championship; Vasil Kiryienka of Belarus was the defending champion, after winning his first title in 2015.

Kiryienka was unable to defend his title as he was beaten by Germany's Tony Martin, who won a record-equalling fourth world title in the discipline. Martin finished 45.05 seconds clear of Kiryienka, with the bronze medal being won by the European champion Jonathan Castroviejo from Spain, who was 25.86 seconds behind Kiryienka and 1 minute, 10.91 seconds in arrears of Martin.

== Course ==
The race started at the Lusail Sports Complex and finished at The Pearl Island, after a flat course of 40 kilometres (25 miles).

== Qualification ==
All National Federations were allowed to enter two riders to start the time trial.

== Final classification ==
Rank	Rider	Time
1	(Germany) Tony Martin (DEU)	44' 42.99"
2	(Belarus) Vasil Kiryienka (BLR)	+ 45.05"
3	(Spain) Jonathan Castroviejo (ESP)	+ 1' 10.91"
4	(Poland) Maciej Bodnar (POL)	+ 1' 16.77"
5	(Republic of Ireland) Ryan Mullen (IRL)	+ 1' 21.75"
6	(Australia) Rohan Dennis (AUS)	+ 1' 27.12"
7	(Belgium) Yves Lampaert (BEL)	+ 1' 45.11"
8	(Netherlands) Jos van Emden (NED)	+ 1' 45.41"
9	(Switzerland) Reto Hollenstein (SUI)	+ 1' 51.51"
10	(Luxembourg) Bob Jungels (LUX)	+ 1' 56.59"
11	(Netherlands) Tom Dumoulin (NED)	+ 2' 01.51"
12	(United Kingdom) Alex Dowsett (GBR)	+ 2' 11.08"
13	(Denmark) Martin Toft Madsen (DNK)	+ 2' 11.42"
14	(Poland) Marcin Białobłocki (POL)	+ 2' 15.30"
15	(United States) Taylor Phinney (USA)	+ 2' 21.68"
16	(Russia) Anton Vorobyev (RUS)	+ 2' 22.67"
17	(Switzerland) Stefan Küng (SUI)	+ 2' 25.04"
18	(Australia) Luke Durbridge (AUS)	+ 2' 28.34"
19	(Ukraine) Andriy Hrivko (UKR)	+ 2' 34.95"
20	(Portugal) Nelson Oliveira (POR)	+ 2' 35.60"
21	(Latvia) Gatis Smukulis (LAT)	+ 2' 37.85"
22	(Italy) Manuel Quinziato (ITA)	+ 2' 39.35"
23	(Norway) Vegard Stake Laengen (NOR)	+ 2' 44.01"
24	(Slovenia) Primož Roglič (SLO)	+ 2' 46.06"
25	(United Kingdom) Steve Cummings (GBR)	+ 2' 48.53"
26	(Belgium) Victor Campenaerts (BEL)	+ 2' 51.00"
27	(New Zealand) Jack Bauer (NZL)	+ 3' 04.37"
28	(United States) Alexey Vermeulen (USA)	+ 3' 15.00"
29	(Canada) Hugo Houle (CAN)	+ 3' 17.24"
30	(Republic of Ireland) Nicolas Roche (IRL)	+ 3' 17.57"
31	(Canada) Ryan Roth (CAN)	+ 3' 21.44"
32	(Belarus) Kanstantsin Sivtsov (BLR)	+ 3' 25.59"
33	(Germany) Jasha Sütterlin (DEU)	+ 3' 26.51"
34	(France) Jérémy Roy (FRA)	+ 3' 28.52"
35	(France) Johan Le Bon (FRA)	+ 3' 29.21"
36	(Denmark) Søren Kragh Andersen (DNK)	+ 3' 43.97"
37	(Spain) Imanol Erviti (ESP)	+ 3' 45.96"
38	(Lithuania) Gediminas Bagdonas (LTU)	+ 3' 47.13"
39	(Norway) Edvald Boasson Hagen (NOR)	+ 3' 50.03"
40	(Kazakhstan) Dmitriy Gruzdev (KAZ)	+ 4' 04.39"
41	(Colombia) Walter Vargas (COL)	+ 4' 32.37"
42	(Lithuania) Ramūnas Navardauskas (LTU)	+ 4' 43.94"
43	(Russia) Maxim Belkov (RUS)	+ 5' 01.51"
44	(Czech Republic) Daniel Turek (CZE)	+ 5' 05.81"
45	(Belarus) Branislau Samoilau (BLR)	+ 5' 08.39"
46	(Eritrea) Mekseb Debesay (ERI)	+ 5' 09.99"
47	(Ukraine) Andriy Vasylyuk (UKR)	+ 5' 28.88"
48	(Uzbekistan) Muradjan Khalmuratov (UZB)	+ 5' 46.52"
49	(Azerbaijan) Elchin Asadov (AZE)	+ 5' 49.44"
50	(Albania) Eugert Zhupa (ALB)	+ 5' 52.91"
51	(Azerbaijan) Maksym Averin (AZE)	+ 6' 49.11"
52	(Albania) Redi Halilaj (ALB)	+ 6' 55.30"
53	(Greece) Polychronis Tzortzakis (GRE)	+ 7' 08.86"
54	(Morocco) Soufiane Haddi (MAR)	+ 7' 39.18"
55	(India) Naveen John (IND)	+ 7' 48.15"
56	(Kazakhstan) Zhandos Bizhigitov (KAZ)	+ 7' 49.65"
57	(Eritrea) Meron Teshome (ERI)	+ 7' 59.40"
58	(Hong Kong) Burr Ho (HKG)	+ 8' 23.62"
59	(Rwanda) Bonaventure Uwizeyimana (RWA)	+ 10' 22.54"
60	(Qatar) Afif Abdullah (QAT)	+ 12' 53.79"
61	(India) Arvind Panwar (IND)	+ 13' 30.99"
62	(Kosovo) Alban Nuha (KOS)	+ 13' 42.35"
63	(Saudi Arabia) Sultan Asiri (KSA)	+ 15' 22.97"
64	(Pakistan) Mohsin Khan (PAK)	+ 15' 50.70"
65	(Pakistan) Hafiz Tahir Mahmood (PAK)	+ 16' 23.03"
66	(Kuwait) Saied Jafer Alali (KUW)	+ 16' 32.52"
DNS	(Finland) Matti Manninen (FIN)	—
DNS	(Bahrain) Mansoor Jawad (BHR)	—
DNS	(Kuwait) Salman Hasan Alsaffar (KUW)	—
DNS	(Bahrain) Sayed Ahmed Alawi (BHR)	—
