= Martin Toft Madsen =

Danish cyclist

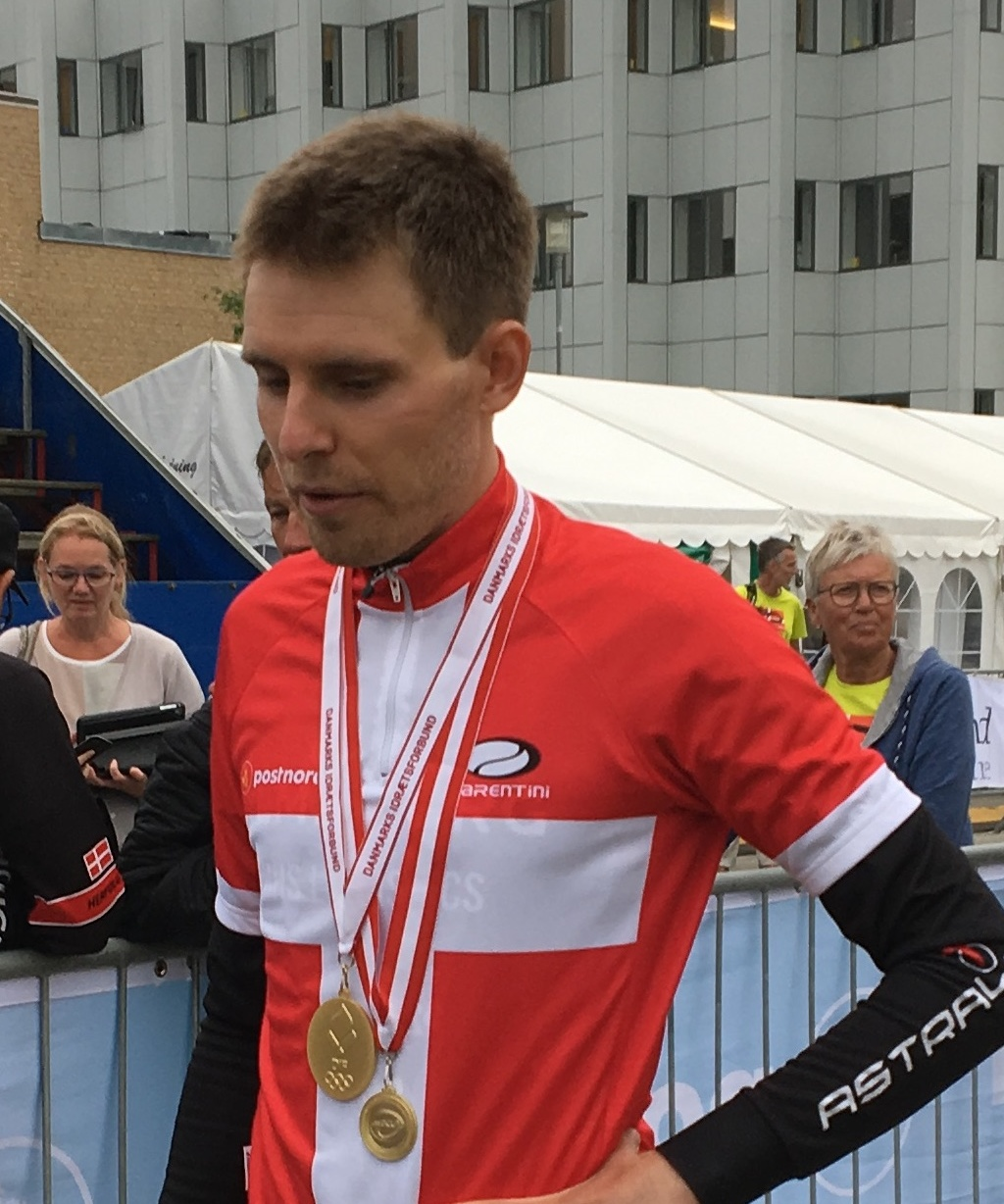
- Madsen in 2017

Personal information
- Full name: Martin Toft Madsen
- Born: 20 February 1985 (age 41) Hørsholm, Denmark

Cycling career
- Sport: Cycling
- Current team: BHS–PL Beton Bornholm
- Discipline: Road
- Role: Rider
- Rider type: Time trialist

Professional team
- 2015–: Team Almeborg–Bornholm

Major wins
- One-day races and Classics National Time Trial Championships (2016, 2017, 2018)

Martin Toft Madsen (born 20 February 1985 in Birkerød) is a Danish cyclist, who currently rides for UCI Continental team BHS–PL Beton Bornholm.

== Major results ==
2015
3rd Duo Normand (with Mathias Westergaard)
2016
1st Time trial, National Road Championships
2nd Duo Normand (with Lars Carstensen)
3rd Chrono des Nations
8th Sundvolden GP
2017
1st Time trial, National Road Championships
1st Chrono des Nations
1st Skive–Løbet
6th Time trial, UEC European Road Championships
7th Sundvolden GP
9th Duo Normand (with Morten Hulgaard)
2018
1st Time trial, National Road Championships
1st Duo Normand (with Rasmus Quaade)
1st Chrono des Nations
1st Chrono Champenois
1st Hafjell GP
9th Sundvolden GP
10th Time trial, UCI Road World Championships
2019
1st Stage 2 (ITT) Danmark Rundt
2nd Time trial, National Road Championships
3rd Chrono Champenois
7th Chrono des Nations
9th Time trial, UEC European Road Championships
2020
2nd Time trial, National Road Championships
2021
2nd Time trial, National Road Championships
2nd Chrono des Nations
2022
4th Chrono des Nations
