= Sylvain Chavanel =

French cyclist

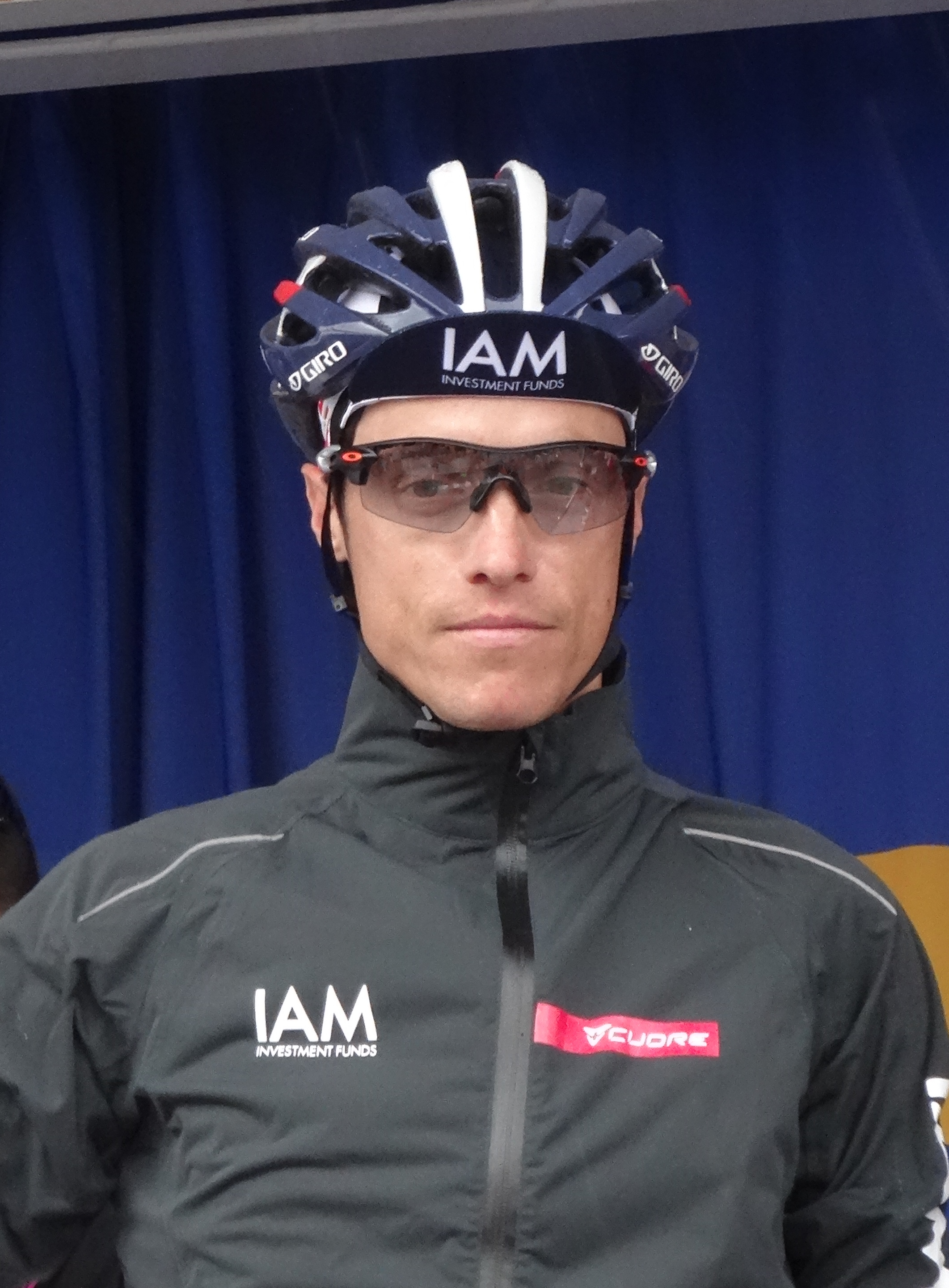
- Chavanel in 2014

Personal information
- Full name: Sylvain Chavanel
- Nicknames: Chava, Mimosa, La Machine
- Born: 30 June 1979 (age 47) Châtellerault, France
- Height: 1.80 m (5 ft 11 in)
- Weight: 70 kg (154 lb; 11 st 0 lb)

Cycling career
- Sport: Cycling
- Current team: Retired
- Discipline: Road
- Role: Rider
- Rider type: All-rounder

Amateur team
- 1999: Vendée U

Professional teams
- 2000–2004: Bonjour
- 2005–2008: Cofidis
- 2009–2013: Quick-Step
- 2014–2015: IAM Cycling
- 2016–2018: Direct Énergie

Major wins
- Grand Tours Tour de France Combativity award (2008, 2010) 3 individual stages (2008, 2010) Stage races Four Days of Dunkirk (2002, 2004) Tour of Belgium (2004) Three Days of De Panne (2012, 2013) One-day races and Classics National Road Race Championships (2011) National Time Trial Championships (2005, 2006, 2008, 2012, 2013, 2014) GP Ouest–France (2014) Brabantse Pijl (2008) Dwars door Vlaanderen (2008)
Medal record
Men's road bicycle racing
Representing Omega Pharma–Quick-Step
World Championships
Gold medal – first place	2012 Valkenburg	Team time trial
Gold medal – first place	2013 Tuscany	Team time trial
Men's track cycling
Representing France
European Championships
Gold medal – first place	2016 Saint-Quentin-en-Yvelines	Team pursuit

Sylvain Chavanel (born 30 June 1979) is a French former professional road bicycle racer, who rode professionally between 2000 and 2018 for the Cofidis, Omega Pharma–Quick-Step, IAM Cycling and two spells with the Brioches La Boulangère/Direct Énergie team. His brother Sébastien Chavanel also rode as a professional cyclist. Sylvain Chavanel was noted as a strong all-rounder who won both sprints and time-trials, and was a good northern classics rider, taking 45 wins during his professional career.

== Background ==
Chavanel was born in Châtellerault, France, although his family roots are in Spain. His great-grandparents were from Huesca, in the Aragon region. His grandfather was born in Barcelona and moved to Châtellerault during the Spanish Civil War. Other members of the family still live in Aragon. He said: "Last year [2007], when the Vuelta was in Zaragoza, I got to know the cousin of mine using a journalist as the translator and she gave me a picture of my grandfather when he was young. Despite my origins, I hardly know a word of Spanish – just swear words".

As a child he played in the garden with models of racing cyclists. He said:

We've got quite a big family and we're all into cycling. I remember playing out in the garden with my three brothers and sister with little figures that we gave names to. I was usually Greg LeMond, then later I went on to be Miguel Induráin then eventually Laurent Jalabert. I remember LeMond's accent. I liked the way he spoke French. I just thought he was a nice guy and I liked his style of riding.

Chavanel began cycling at Châtellerault school when he was eight. He gave up to try football, then went back.

I started cycling again at 12 and from then on I improved every year. I was a fragile little thing, immature physically. I used to finish races halfway down the girls' field and at the back of the boys'. Everything changed the day that I beat my elder brother, Frédéric, in the cadet category, although he was better than me at the time.

== Racing career ==
He began racing when he was 13. He won 29 races on the road as a schoolboy and a junior. He won the national junior individual pursuit championship in 1997. His uncle, Philippe Raby, a former rider in the Vendée region, recommended him to Jean-René Bernaudeau who was building a professional team based there. Bernardeau saw Chavanel race for the first time at Montreveau, in Maine-et-Loire, when he was racing against riders from Bernardeau's Vendée U junior team.

=== Bonjour (2000–2004) ===
Bernardeau and Chavanel agreed that Chavanel would spend another year with his club, AC Châtellerault, which had spent time and money on his training. Bernardeau's assistant, Thierry Bricau, was given the job of providing Chavanel with a training programme. Chavanel rode the Tour de l'Avenir in 1999 and then in 2000, aged 21, he turned professional for Bernardeau's Bonjour team, sponsored by a chain of local newspapers. He won the first stage of the Circuit Franco-Belge and lost his leader's jersey only on the last day. He also won the climbers' jersey in the Tour de l'Avenir by breaking clear in the Pyrenees and rode 217 kilometres (135 miles) alone at the front of Paris–Tours.

Bernardeau said:

Sylvain has some of the faults I had as a young rider. He's always working at the front of the race – you have to rein him in for his own good. At his age, life is beautiful and risks are there to be taken. But he's acquiring self-knowledge and his days of gratuitous long-range sorties and suicide attacks are coming to an end.

Chavanel rode his first Tour de France at 22, finishing 65th, later coming third in the Tour de l'Avenir behind Denis Menchov and Florent Brard. In 2002 he won the Four Days of Dunkirk and finished third in the Tour of Belgium. He later won both of those races in 2005.

=== Cofidis (2005–2008) ===
On 25 July 2008 Chavanel won the 19th stage of the Tour de France by outsprinting Jérémy Roy at Montluçon. That and other performances brought him election as the most combative rider of the race.

On 3 September 2008, he came second in the individual time trial stage of the Vuelta a España at Ciudad Real. His ride brought him to second place overall, two seconds slower than the American, Levi Leipheimer. His team worked for him next day from Ciudad Real to Toledo to make sure he won time bonuses offered along the route. The six seconds he collected were enough to give him the leader's jersey on 4 September.

=== Quick Step (2009–2013) ===
Chavanel said in 2007 that he had had offers from foreign teams but was discouraged from joining them because he was unsure of his pension payments outside France. In July 2008 he said he had agreed with Patrick Lefevere the directeur sportif to join the Quick-Step team in Belgium for 2009. Chavanel said he made his decision to move after riding well in classic races in Belgium at the start of the year. He won Dwars door Vlaanderen and the Brabantse Pijl. He said:

I had other options as well. Professionally, it's an experience that can only do me good. I had the chance to sign for three years with AG2R-La Mondiale but I had the feeling that I wasn't going to develop enough. I have always raced in France and, in my heart, some experience abroad has excited me for some time. I therefore decided to take the step and Patrick Lefévère's advances completely persuaded me.

During the 2010 Tour de France, Chavanel took over the yellow jersey after attacking at the 10-kilometre (6.2-mile) mark on stage 2. Following a series of crashes affecting the General Classification contenders on the descent into Spa, the race was neutralized for every rider except Chavanel, who was the lone escapee at that time. He capitalized on that, opening up enough of a gap to win the stage and capture the yellow jersey from Fabian Cancellara (Team Saxo Bank). The following stage was not so good for Chavanel as two punctures on the cobbled roads meant Fabian Cancellara re-took the yellow jersey, however on the Tour's first mountain stage from Tournus to Station des Rousses Chavanel bridged the gap to an early breakaway and rode away to take a famous win and inherit the yellow jersey for the second time.

In the 2011 Vuelta a España Chavanel held the red leader's jersey for four stages. On stage three, as part of a breakaway, he finished second behind Pablo Lastras which left him second in general classification, 20 seconds behind Lastras. However, on the next stage Chavanel finished just 57 seconds behind the stage winner while Lastras lost over 18 minutes, thereby making Chavanel the overall leader of the Vuelta. He held this jersey until stage 8 where it was taken by Joaquim Rodríguez.

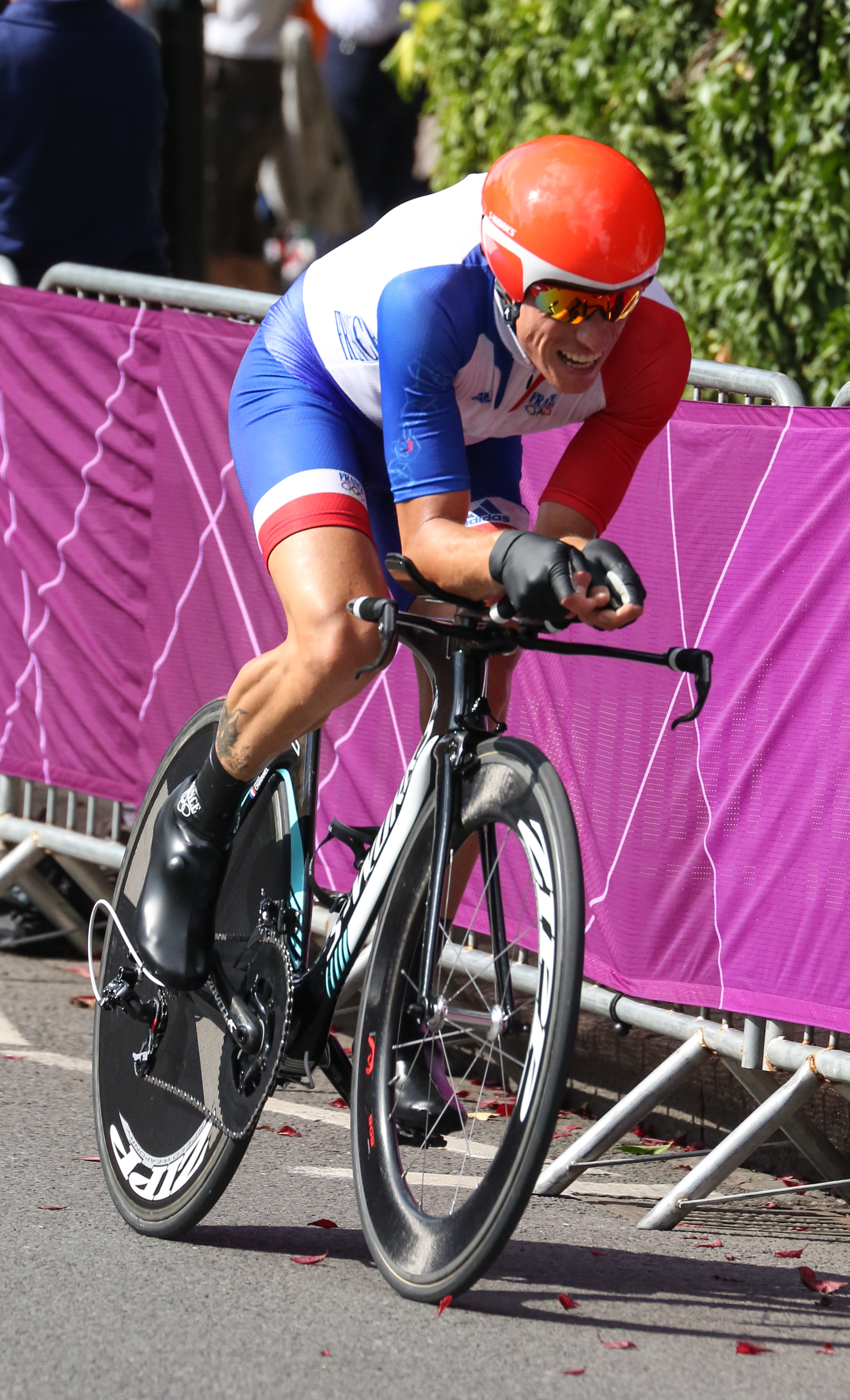
Chavanel competing in the 2012 Olympics time trial in London

In 2012, Chavanel won the Three Days of De Panne and won the French National Time Trial Championships for the fourth time.

In 2013, after strong appearances in the Tour de San Luis and the Volta ao Algarve, Chavanel won stage six of Paris–Nice, taking the points classification at the race. Chavanel also won the overall classification at the Three Days of De Panne for the second year in a row, winning the final time trial stage.

After five years with the team, Chavanel left the squad at the end of the 2013 season, and joined IAM Cycling for the 2014 season.

=== IAM (2014–2015) ===
After winning the National Time trial title, Chavanel went on to win the 2014 Tour du Poitou-Charentes thanks to a great performance in the stage 4 time trial. A couple of days later, Chavanel prevailed in the World Tour race GP Ouest-France winning the sprint out of a small group ahead of Arthur Vichot. In 2015 he also accomplished the impressive feat of starting and finishing each Grand Tour.

=== Direct Énergie (2016–2018) ===
In September 2015 Direct Énergie announced that Chavanel would join them for the 2016 season. In 2018, Chavanel participated in the Tour de France for the 18th time to take the record outright from Stuart O'Grady and Jens Voigt for the most Tour de France participations and was given the most combative rider award for the second stage. On 26 July 2018, Chavanel finished Stage 18 of the race to break the record for most number of stages completed – overtaking Joop Zoetemelk's 365. Three days later, he tied Zoetemelk's record of finishing the Tour de France 16 times and set the new record stages completed number at 369. On the last day of the race, 29 July, he announced he would retire after Tour de Vendée on 6 October 2018. He extended his career to the following week's Chrono des Nations before retiring.

== Nickname ==
Chavanel was known as Chava, Mimosa or Mimo, after a French film character he imitated. In the Dutch-speaking Belgian media, he was nicknamed 'La Machine' for his outstanding stamina and determination.

== Major results ==
=== Road ===
1999
7th Overall Circuit des Mines
2000
1st Mountains classification, Tour de l'Avenir
3rd Overall Circuit Franco-Belge

1st Stage 1

6th Overall Tour de l'Ain
6th Grand Prix de Villers-Cotterêts
8th Grand Prix de la Ville de Lillers
2001
2nd Châteauroux Classic
3rd Overall Tour de l'Avenir
3rd Polynormande
4th Overall Tour de l'Ain
6th Overall Tour de Picardie
7th Overall Circuit Franco-Belge
9th Le Samyn
2002
1st Overall Four Days of Dunkirk
1st Trophée des Grimpeurs
2nd Overall Tour du Poitou-Charentes
3rd Overall Tour of Belgium
3rd Châteauroux Classic
9th Overall Danmark Rundt
2003
1st Tour du Haut Var
2nd Overall Tour du Poitou-Charentes
2nd Grand Prix de Plumelec-Morbihan
3rd Overall Tour Méditerranéen
5th Overall Paris–Nice
5th Overall Critérium International
5th Overall Circuit de la Sarthe

1st Stage 3b (ITT)

5th Paris–Bourges
9th Overall Paris–Corrèze
9th Tro-Bro Léon
2004
1st Overall Tour of Belgium
1st Overall Four Days of Dunkirk
1st Polynormande
Tour du Poitou-Charentes

1st Stages 3 & 4 (ITT)

5th Paris–Camembert
5th Trophée des Grimpeurs
6th Grand Prix de Fourmies
9th Overall Tour Méditerranéen
10th Overall Critérium International
2005
1st Time trial, National Championships
1st Overall Circuit de la Sarthe

1st Stage 5

1st Overall Tour du Poitou-Charentes
1st Duo Normand (with Thierry Marichal)
9th Overall Tour de Pologne
2006
1st Time trial, National Championships
1st Overall Tour du Poitou-Charentes
7th Overall Paris–Corrèze
7th Paris–Bourges
8th Gran Premio di Lugano
2007
3rd Trophée des Grimpeurs
4th Overall Critérium International
9th Grand Prix de Plumelec-Morbihan
10th Overall Critérium du Dauphiné Libéré
2008
1st Time trial, National Championships
1st Dwars door Vlaanderen
1st Brabantse Pijl
Tour de France

1st Stage 19
Combativity award Stages 2, 6 & 19
Winner Super Combativity award

1st Stage 5 Tour Méditerranéen
1st Stage 4 Volta a Catalunya
2nd Overall Volta ao Algarve
8th Overall Paris–Nice

1st Stage 6

10th Time trial, UCI World Championships
2009
2nd Time trial, National Championships
2nd Overall Eneco Tour

1st Prologue

2nd Overall Volta ao Algarve
3rd Overall Paris–Nice

1st Points classification
1st Stage 3

4th Grote Prijs Jef Scherens
5th E3 Prijs Vlaanderen
7th Paris–Roubaix
7th Dwars door Vlaanderen
9th Kuurne–Brussels–Kuurne
2010
Tour de France

1st Stages 2 & 7
Held after Stages 2 & 7
Held after Stage 2
Combativity award Stage 2 & Overall

2nd Time trial, National Championships
7th Overall Tour du Limousin
2011
1st Road race, National Championships
2nd Tour of Flanders
4th Overall Three Days of De Panne
Vuelta a España

Held after Stages 4–7

2012
1st Team time trial, UCI World Championships
1st Time trial, National Championships
1st Overall Three Days of De Panne

1st Stage 3b (ITT)

2nd Overall Eneco Tour
2nd Dwars door Vlaanderen
2nd Chrono des Nations
8th Overall Paris–Nice
8th Overall Tour de San Luis
10th Tour of Flanders
2013
1st Team time trial, UCI World Championships
National Championships

1st Time trial
2nd Road race

1st Overall Three Days of De Panne

1st Stage 3b (ITT)

3rd Chrono des Nations
4th Milan–San Remo
4th Brabantse Pijl
5th Overall Paris–Nice

1st Points classification
1st Stage 6

6th Overall Eneco Tour

1st Stage 5 (ITT)

6th E3 Harelbeke
7th Omloop Het Nieuwsblad
8th Grand Prix de Wallonie
2014
1st Time trial, National Championships
1st Overall Tour du Poitou-Charentes

1st Stage 4 (ITT)

1st GP Ouest–France
1st Chrono des Nations
2nd Overall Four Days of Dunkirk

1st Stage 3

3rd Overall Tour of Belgium
5th Dwars door Vlaanderen
7th Overall Tour Méditerranéen
7th Overall Tour of Britain
2015
National Championships

3rd Time trial
3rd Road race

9th Overall Vuelta a Andalucía
2016
1st Overall Tour du Poitou-Charentes

1st Stage 4 (ITT)

4th Overall Étoile de Bessèges

1st Stage 3

5th Overall Three Days of De Panne
2017
4th Time trial, National Championships
4th Overall Three Days of De Panne
5th Overall Four Days of Dunkirk

1st Stage 4

5th Overall Étoile de Bessèges
9th Tour of Flanders
9th Tro-Bro Léon
10th Chrono des Nations
Combativity award Stage 16 Tour de France
2018
2nd Overall Tour Poitou-Charentes en Nouvelle-Aquitaine
4th Overall Étoile de Bessèges
4th Overall Tour La Provence
5th Cholet-Pays de Loire
5th Chrono des Nations
6th La Roue Tourangelle
6th Paris–Chauny
Combativity award Stage 2 Tour de France

==== Grand Tour general classification results timeline ====
Grand Tour	2001	2002	2003	2004	2005	2006	2007	2008	2009	2010	2011	2012	2013	2014	2015	2016	2017	2018
Giro d'Italia	—	—	—	—	—	—	—	—	—	—	—	—	—	—	36	—	—	—
Tour de France	65	36	37	30	58	45	DNF	61	19	31	61	DNF	31	34	54	43	25	39
Vuelta a España	—	—	—	—	—	—	16	DNF	—	—	27	—	—	—	47	—	—	—

==== Classics results timeline ====
Monument	2000	2001	2002	2003	2004	2005	2006	2007	2008	2009	2010	2011	2012	2013	2014	2015	2016	2017	2018
Milan–San Remo	—	—	—	—	52	—	71	—	59	37	21	20	—	4	21	23	—	—	—
Tour of Flanders	—	—	—	—	—	—	—	—	29	31	24	2	10	13	19	45	33	9	—
Paris–Roubaix	DNF	52	—	DNF	—	—	—	—	—	7	—	38	27	19	—	94	DNF	19	80
Liège–Bastogne–Liège	—	—	DNF	DNF	89	48	46	57	—	—	DNF	69	DNF	—	—	—	—	—	—
Giro di Lombardia	—	—	—	—	—	84	—	—	—	—	DNF	DNF	DNF	DNF	—	—	—	—	—
Classic	2000	2001	2002	2003	2004	2005	2006	2007	2008	2009	2010	2011	2012	2013	2014	2015	2016	2017	2018
Omloop Het Nieuwsblad	—	—	—	—	—	—	—	—	36	17	20	25	21	7	26	28	34	53	—
Kuurne–Brussels–Kuurne	—	—	—	—	—	—	—	—	—	9	22	91	125	NH	—	—	—	60	—
E3 Harelbeke	—	—	—	—	—	—	—	—	—	5	28	—	33	6	29	20	—	61	29
Gent–Wevelgem	—	71	—	—	—	—	—	—	—	—	22	47	—	—	—	20	72	—	—
Dwars door Vlaanderen	—	—	—	—	—	—	—	—	1	7	66	27	2	—	5	—	—	85	72
Brabantse Pijl	—	—	—	—	—	—	—	—	1	—	24	—	—	4	—	23	—	—	—
Amstel Gold Race	—	—	—	119	—	60	60	109	57	24	16	16	37	—	DNF	79	—	—	—
Clásica de San Sebastián	—	—	—	—	—	106	91	70	14	32	—	17	DNF	11	—	—	—	—	—
GP Ouest–France	—	—	—	—	—	58	12	—	59	—	33	—	91	48	1	—	34	—	—
Paris–Tours	85	84	—	—	—	87	—	—	—	36	51	35	83	12	31	—	—	—	45

Legend
—	Did not compete
DNF	Did not finish
NH	Not held

=== Track ===
2015
1st Individual pursuit, National Championships
2016
1st Team pursuit, UEC European Championships
1st Individual pursuit, National Championships
UCI World Cup, Glasgow

1st Individual pursuit
2nd Team pursuit

2017
National Championships

1st Madison (with Thomas Boudat)
2nd Individual pursuit

2018
National Championships

2nd Individual pursuit
2nd Madison (with Thomas Boudat)
3rd Team pursuit
