= Stéphane Rossetto =

French bicycle racer

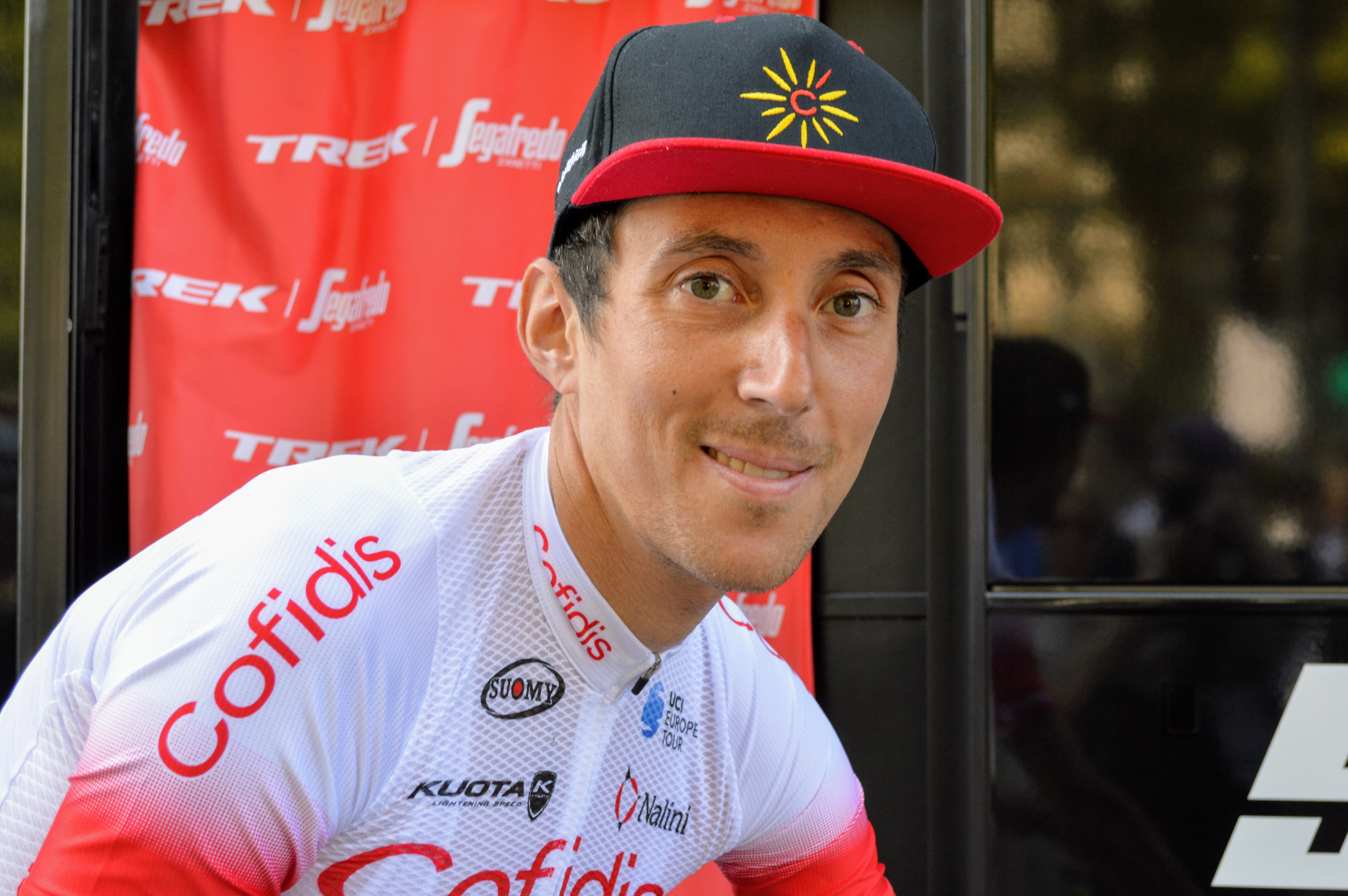
- Rossetto at 2019 Clásica de San Sebastián

Personal information
- Full name: Stéphane Rossetto
- Born: 6 April 1987 (age 39) Melun, France
- Height: 180 cm (5 ft 11 in)
- Weight: 66 kg (146 lb)

Cycling career
- Sport: Cycling
- Current team: Retired
- Discipline: Road
- Role: Rider
- Rider type: Climber

Amateur teams
- 2001–2005: Peltrax–CS Dammarie-lès-Lys
- 2006: US Créteil
- 2007–2009: CC Nogent-sur-Oise
- 2011–2012: CC Nogent-sur-Oise

Professional teams
- 2010: Vacansoleil
- 2013–2014: BigMat–Auber 93
- 2015–2020: Cofidis
- 2021–2022: St. Michel–Auber93

Stéphane Rossetto (born 6 April 1987 in Melun) is a French former cyclist, who competed as a professional in 2010 and from 2013 to 2022. He is notable for his long range final stage win from 115 kilometres (71 miles) out in the 2018 Tour de Yorkshire which also gave him the Mountains classification. In July 2019, he was named in the startlist for the 2019 Tour de France. In October 2020, he was named in the startlist for the 2020 Giro d'Italia.

== Major results ==
2005
2nd Time trial, National Junior Road Championships
3rd Chrono des Nations Juniors
7th Route de l'Avenir - Souvenir Louis Caput
10th GP Général Patton
2006
1st Vienna Classic Espoirs
1st Chrono Tauxigny
3rd Chrono des Nations U23
9th Chrono Champenois
2007
1st Grand Prix de Beauchamps
6th Chrono des Nations U23
9th Chrono Champenois
2008
1st Grand Prix de Lys-les-Lannoy
7th Overall Tour de Gironde
2009
1st Overall Tour de Gironde
3rd Boucles de la Marne
8th Chrono Champenois
2011
8th Overall Tour de la Manche

1st Stages 2 & 4

9th Paris–Mantes-en-Yvelines
2012
1st Overall Tour des Pays de Savoie

1st Stage 1

1st Trio Normand
1st Stage 4 Circuit des Ardennes
3rd Grand Prix Cristal Energie
5th Time trial, National Road Championships
2013
1st Stage 4 Tour du Limousin
2nd Overall Tour du Gévaudan Languedoc-Roussillon
5th Overall Tour de l'Ain
9th Grand Prix de la Somme
2014
1st Overall Boucles de la Mayenne
6th Overall Route du Sud
7th Chrono des Nations
8th Tour du Doubs
9th Paris–Camembert
9th Polynormande
2015
2nd Time trial, National Road Championships
3rd Overall Tour du Gévaudan Languedoc-Roussillon
4th Overall Route du Sud
4th Overall Tour de Yorkshire
4th Chrono des Nations
2016
5th Overall Tour of Austria
8th Overall Route du Sud
10th Overall Circuit de la Sarthe
10th Chrono des Nations
2017
4th Chrono des Nations
9th Overall Tour du Gévaudan Languedoc-Roussillon
2018
Tour de Yorkshire

1st Mountains classification
1st Stage 4

3rd Chrono des Nations
2019
2nd Time trial, National Road Championships
Combativity award Stage 1 Tour de France
2022
6th Overall Tour Alsace
10th Chrono des Nations

=== Grand Tour general classification results timeline ===
Grand Tour	2015	2016	2017	2018	2019	2020
Giro d'Italia	—	—	—	—	—	63
Tour de France	—	—	—	—	100	—
Vuelta a España	DNF	61	54	54	127	—

Legend
—	Did not compete
DNF	Did not finish
