= 2014 Chrono des Nations =

Race details
- Dates: 19 October 2014
- Stages: 1
- Distance: 51.53 km (32.02 mi)
- Winning time: 1 hr 04' 18"

Results
	Winner	Sylvain Chavanel (FRA)	(IAM Cycling)
	Second	Jérémy Roy (FRA)	(FDJ.fr)
	Third	Reidar Borgersen (NOR)	(Team Joker)

The 2014 Chrono des Nations was a one-day time trial held at the end of the 2014 UCI Europe Tour and cycling season. The tour has an UCI rating of 1.1. The race was won by the Frenchman Sylvain Chavanel after the winner of the previous three editions, Tony Martin, decided not to enter the race.

== Results ==
Result

	Rider	Team	Time
1	Sylvain Chavanel (FRA)	IAM Cycling	1h 04' 18"
2	Jérémy Roy (FRA)	FDJ.fr	+ 53"
3	Reidar Borgersen (NOR)	Team Joker	+ 2' 03"
4	Carlos Oyarzun (CHI)	Efapel–Glassdrive	+ 3' 02"
5	Aleksejs Saramotins (LAT)	IAM Cycling	+ 3' 24"
6	Julien Fouchard (FRA)	Cofidis	+ 3' 34"
7	Stéphane Rossetto (FRA)	BigMat–Auber 93	+ 3' 39"
8	Pierre-Luc Périchon (FRA)	Bretagne–Séché Environnement	+ 3' 54"
9	Nicolas Baldo (FRA)	Team Vorarlberg	+ 4' 12"
10	Jelle Wallays (BEL)	Topsport Vlaanderen–Baloise	+ 4' 14"
