= 2017 Chrono des Nations =

Race details
- Dates: 15 October 2017
- Stages: 1
- Distance: 49.7 km (30.88 mi)
- Winning time: 59' 59"

Results
	Winner	Martin Toft Madsen (DEN)
	Second	Mikkel Bjerg (DEN)
	Third	Jonathan Castroviejo (ESP)

The 2017 Chrono des Nations was the 36th edition of the Chrono des Nations cycle race and was held on 15 October 2017. The race started and finished in Les Herbiers. The race was won by Martin Toft Madsen.

== General classification ==
Final general classification

Rank	Rider	Time
1	Martin Toft Madsen (DEN)	59' 59"
2	Mikkel Bjerg (DEN)	+ 1' 22"
3	Jonathan Castroviejo (ESP)	+ 1' 25"
4	Stéphane Rossetto (FRA)	+ 1' 47"
5	Victor Campenaerts (BEL)	+ 2' 02"
6	Pierre Latour (FRA)	+ 2' 28"
7	Jérémy Roy (FRA)	+ 2' 43"
8	Ryan Mullen (IRL)	+ 2' 55"
9	Anthony Delaplace (FRA)	+ 2' 56"
10	Sylvain Chavanel (FRA)	+ 3' 24"
