= Jonathan Castroviejo =

Spanish racing cyclist

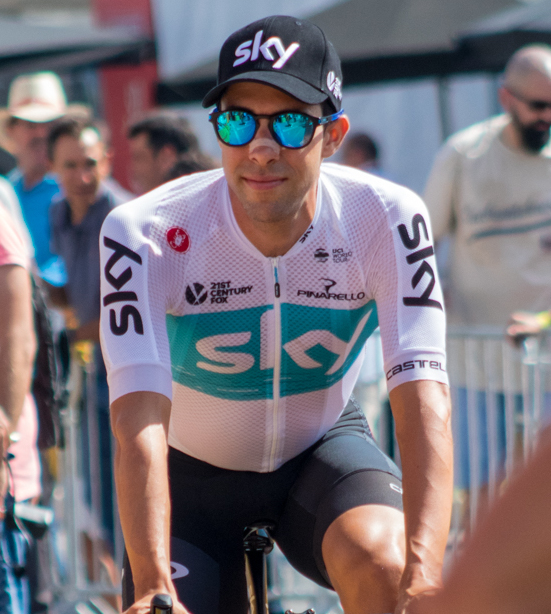
- Castroviejo in 2018

Personal information
- Full name: Jonathan Castroviejo Nicolás
- Born: 27 April 1987 (age 39) Getxo, Spain
- Height: 1.71 m (5 ft 7 1/2 in)
- Weight: 62 kg (137 lb; 9 st 11 lb)

Cycling career
- Sport: Cycling
- Discipline: Road
- Role: Rider
- Rider type: Time trialist, Climber

Amateur team
- 2008–2009: Orbea–Oreka SDA

Professional teams
- 2010–2011: Euskaltel–Euskadi
- 2012–2017: Movistar Team
- 2018–2025: Team Sky

Major wins
- One-day races and Classics European Time Trial Championships (2016) National Time Trial Championships (2013, 2015, 2017–2019, 2023)
Medal record
Representing Spain
World Championships
Bronze medal – third place	2016 Doha	Time trial
European Championships
Gold medal – first place	2016 Plumelec	Time trial
Silver medal – second place	2018 Glasgow	Time trial
Representing Movistar Team
World Championships
Bronze medal – third place	2015 Richmond	Team time trial

Jonathan Castroviejo Nicolás (born 27 April 1987) is a Spanish former professional cyclist, who last rode for UCI WorldTeam Netcompany–Ineos.

Castroviejo specialised in time trials, with all of his eleven professional victories – including a gold medal at the 2016 European Road Championships and a record six victories in the Spanish National Time Trial Championships – coming in the discipline.

== Career ==
=== Orbea and Euskaltel–Euskadi (2008–2011) ===
Born in Getxo, Basque Country, Spain, Castroviejo spent two seasons with the feeder team of the de facto Basque national squad Orbea–Oreka SDA, before he joined Euskaltel–Euskadi in 2010. He won his first race as a professional at the 2011 Tour de Romandie, clocking the fastest time in the 3.5 km (2.2 mi) prologue individual time trial, beating reigning under-23 world champion Taylor Phinney by 0.27 seconds. The result came the day before Castroviejo's 24th birthday. His prowess in the time trial was relatively uncommon for a Euskaltel–Euskadi rider, as the team was known for fielding lightweight climbers with little ability against the clock. The Romandie stage win was, however, not a complete shock – earlier in the season, Castroviejo had finished eighth in the time trial which closed out Tirreno–Adriatico, besting the times of riders such as Gustav Larsson, Cadel Evans, and David Zabriskie, all of whom had reputations as time trial specialists. Castroviejo turned in another strong time trial later in the Tour de Romandie, taking ninth in the 20.1 km (12.5 mi) long race against the clock, better than Marco Pinotti and Jean-Christophe Péraud (among others), both former champions of their respective nations in the time trial.

=== Movistar Team (2012–2017) ===
Castroviejo moved to the Movistar Team for the 2012 season. He wore the Vuelta a España's general classification jersey for two stages since his team won the opening Team time trial and he crossed the line first, but lost it two days later to teammate Alejandro Valverde. Castroviejo could not follow the frantic pace set by Alberto Contador (Saxo Bank–Tinkoff Bank) on the final climb of the third stage.

In 2015, Castroviejo won the Spanish National Time Trial Championships for the second time in his career.

=== Team Sky (2018–present) ===
On 17 August 2017, it was announced that Castroviejo would join Team Sky for the 2018 season. In his first season with the team, he defended his Spanish National Time Trial Championships title, won a silver medal in the time trial at the UEC European Road Championships in Glasgow, and finished in the top-ten placings in the time trial at the UCI Road World Championships in Innsbruck. He added further national time trial titles in 2019 and 2023.

== Major results ==
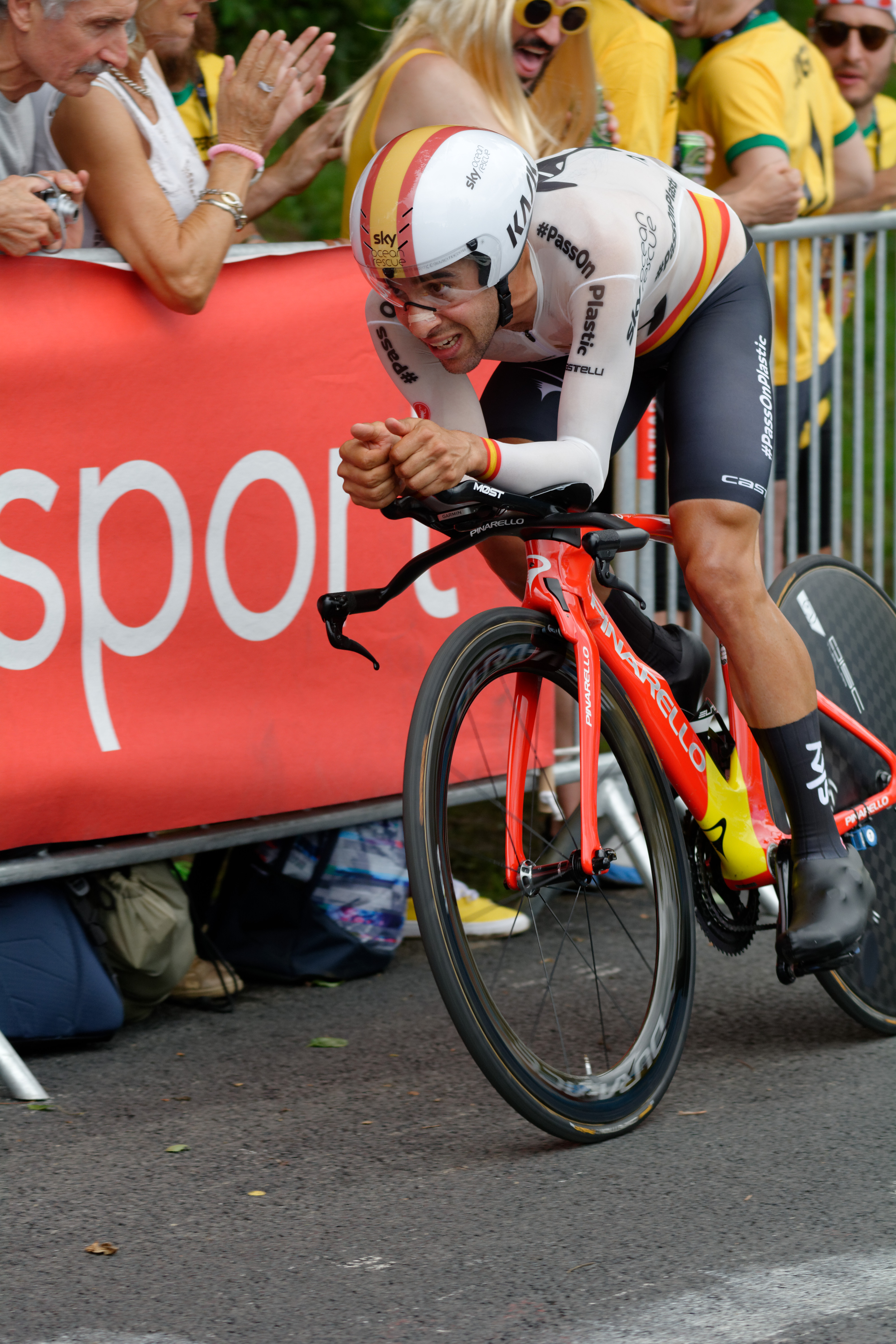
Castroviejo at the 2018 Tour de France

2005
3rd Road race, National Junior Road Championships
2009
1st Stage 3 Tour du Haut-Anjou
1st Stage 5 Tour de l'Avenir
2nd Overall Ronde de l'Isard

1st Prologue

2nd Overall Circuito Montañés
2010
1st Sprints classification, Volta a Catalunya
5th Time trial, National Road Championships
2011 (2 pro wins)
1st Prologue Tour de Romandie
2nd Time trial, National Road Championships
3rd Overall Vuelta a la Comunidad de Madrid

1st Stage 1 (ITT)

2012 (1)
Vuelta a España

1st Stage 1 (TTT)
Held after Stages 1–2

2nd Time trial, National Road Championships
5th Overall Vuelta a la Comunidad de Madrid

1st Sprints classification
1st Stage 1 (ITT)

5th Overall Vuelta a Murcia

1st Points classification

6th Overall Eneco Tour
7th Overall Vuelta a Castilla y León
9th Time trial, Olympic Games
2013 (1)
1st Time trial, National Road Championships
1st Sprints classification, Vuelta a Asturias
8th Overall Volta ao Algarve
2014
Vuelta a España

1st Stage 1 (TTT)
Held after Stage 1

3rd Time trial, National Road Championships
10th Time trial, UCI Road World Championships
2015 (1)
1st Time trial, National Road Championships
UCI World Championships

3rd Team time trial
4th Time trial

3rd Overall Tour du Poitou-Charentes
2016 (1)
1st Time trial, UEC European Road Championships
2nd Time trial, National Road Championships
2nd Chrono des Nations
3rd Time trial, UCI Road World Championships
4th Time trial, Olympic Games
2017 (2)
1st Time trial, National Road Championships
2nd Overall Tour du Poitou-Charentes
3rd Overall Circuit de la Sarthe
3rd Chrono des Nations
7th Overall Tirreno–Adriatico
7th Overall Volta ao Algarve

1st Stage 3 (ITT)

10th Overall Volta a la Comunitat Valenciana
2018 (1)
1st Time trial, National Road Championships
1st Stage 3 (TTT) Critérium du Dauphiné
2nd Time trial, UEC European Road Championships
6th Time trial, UCI Road World Championships
Combativity award Stage 19 Vuelta a España
2019 (1)
1st Time trial, National Road Championships
2023 (1)
1st Time trial, National Road Championships

=== Grand Tour general classification results timeline ===
Grand Tour	2012	2013	2014	2015	2016	2017	2018	2019	2020	2021	2022	2023	2024	2025
Giro d'Italia	—	—	57	—	—	—	—	—	24	23	64	—	—	61
Tour de France	—	97	—	24	—	60	70	50	DNF	23	48	15	53	—
Vuelta a España	148	—	65	—	36	—	100	—	—	—	—	60	—	—

Legend
—	Did not compete
DNF	Did not finish
IP	In progress

Sporting positions
Preceded by Luis León Sánchez	Spanish National Time Trial Championships; Winner; 2013	Succeeded by Alejandro Valverde
Preceded by Alejandro Valverde	Spanish National Time Trial Championships; Winner; 2015	Succeeded by Ion Izagirre
Preceded by Ion Izagirre	Spanish National Time Trial Championships; Winner; 2017–2019	Succeeded by Pello Bilbao
Preceded by Raúl García Pierna	Spanish National Time Trial Championships; Winner; 2023	Succeeded by Incumbent
