= Vasil Kiryienka =

Belarusian racing cyclist

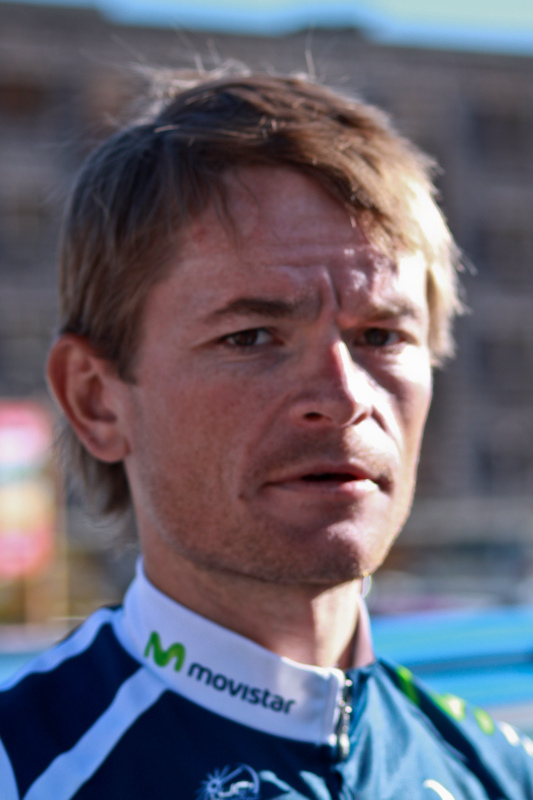
- Kiryienka at the 2011 Giro d'Italia

Personal information
- Full name: Vasili Vasilyevich Kiryienka
- Nickname: Robocop
- Born: 28 June 1981 (age 45): Rechytsa, Byelorussian SSR, Soviet Union; (now Belarus)
- Height: 1.82 m (6 ft 0 in)
- Weight: 75 kg (165 lb; 11.8 st)

Cycling career
- Sport: Cycling
- Current team: BelAZ
- Disciplines: Road; Track
- Role: Rider (retired); Directeur sportif
- Rider type: Time trialist; Domestique

Professional teams
- 2006: OTC Doors
- 2006: Rietumu Banka–Riga
- 2007–2008: Tinkoff Credit Systems
- 2009–2012: Caisse d'Epargne
- 2013–2020: Team Sky

Managerial team
- 2021–: BelAZ

Major wins
- Grand Tours Giro d'Italia 3 individual stages (2008, 2011, 2015) Vuelta a España 1 individual stage (2013) One-day races and Classics World Time Trial Championships (2015) National Time Trial Championships (2002, 2005, 2006, 2015, 2018) European Games Time Trial (2015, 2019)
Medal record
Men's road bicycle racing
Representing Belarus
World Championships
Gold medal – first place	2015 Richmond	Time trial
Silver medal – second place	2016 Doha	Time trial
Bronze medal – third place	2012 Valkenburg	Time trial
European Games
Gold medal – first place	2015 Baku	Time trial
Gold medal – first place	2019 Minsk	Time trial
Representing Team Sky
World Championships
Bronze medal – third place	2013 Tuscany	Team time trial
Men's track cycling
Representing Belarus
World Championships
Gold medal – first place	2008 Manchester	Points race
Bronze medal – third place	2006 Bordeaux	Points race

Vasili Vasilyevich Kiryienka (Belarusian: Васіль Васілевіч Кірыенка; Łacinka: Vasil Vasilevič Kiryjenka; born 28 June 1981) is a Belarusian former racing cyclist, who rode professionally between 2006 and 2020 for the OTC Doors, Rietumu Banka–Riga, Tinkoff Credit Systems, Movistar Team and Team INEOS squads. He currently works as a directeur sportif for UCI Continental team BelAZ.

== Career ==
=== Early years ===
Born in Rechytsa, Byelorussian Soviet Socialist Republic, Kiryienka won his first national time trial championship in 2002. His early career focused mainly on the track, where he won the Points Race at the 2008 UCI Track Cycling World Championships. Later that season Kiryienka won Stage 19 of the Giro d'Italia, a mountainous affair leading to Presolana, after spending the day on the attack and registering more than 6 hours and a half in the saddle. He attacked his six breakaway companions at the foot of the Monte Para climb and soloed to the finish for the win, by a margin of over four minutes.

=== Caisse d'Epargne (2009–2012) ===
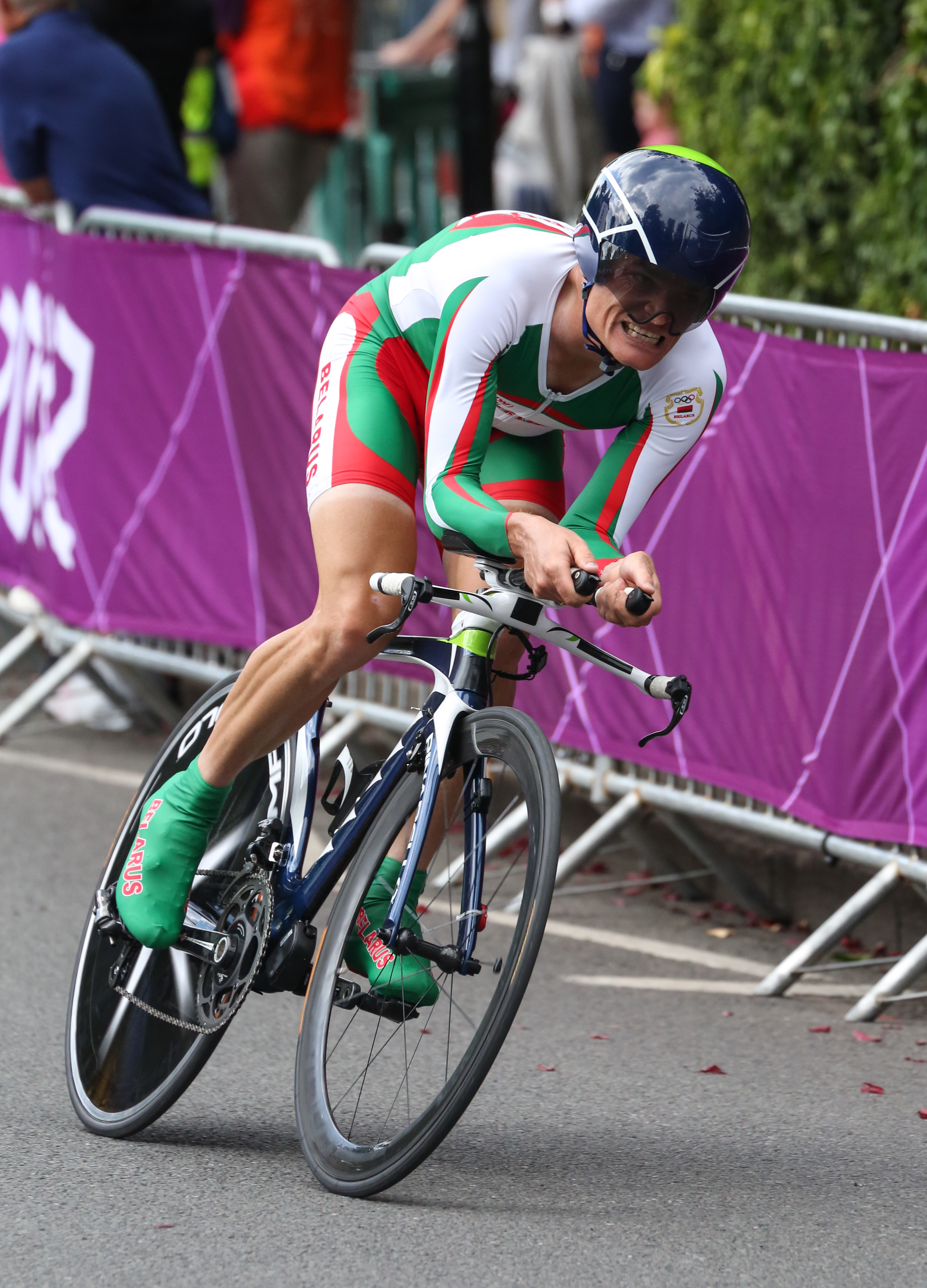
Kiryienka competing in the time trial at the 2012 Summer Olympics in London

Kiryienka moved to the Spanish Caisse d'Epargne squad for the 2009 season.

In 2010 he finished second in the tenth stage of the Tour de France after he was outsprinted at the line in Gap by Sérgio Paulinho (Team RadioShack) after the pair's decisive attack with 14 kilometres (8.7 miles) remaining.

On 23 May 2011, during the Giro d'Italia, Kiryienka's Movistar Team teammate Xabier Tondo was killed in a freak accident at home while preparing to train with teammates. He was reportedly crushed between his car and a garage door. Five days later, Kiryienka rode to victory in a solo effort on Stage 20, a mountain top finish at Sestriere, and he dedicated the stage victory to Tondó, pointing skyward as he crossed the finish line. The team had met to consider withdrawing from the race after Tondó's death, but instead the riders unanimously voted to ride on. Kiryienka commented that the squad at the Giro hoped to get a further stage win (as Francisco Ventoso's win had come before Tondó's death) to honor him, while other members of the team grieved with Tondó's family.

In September 2012, Kiryienka finished third in the individual time trial at the road world championships.

=== Team Sky (2013–2020) ===
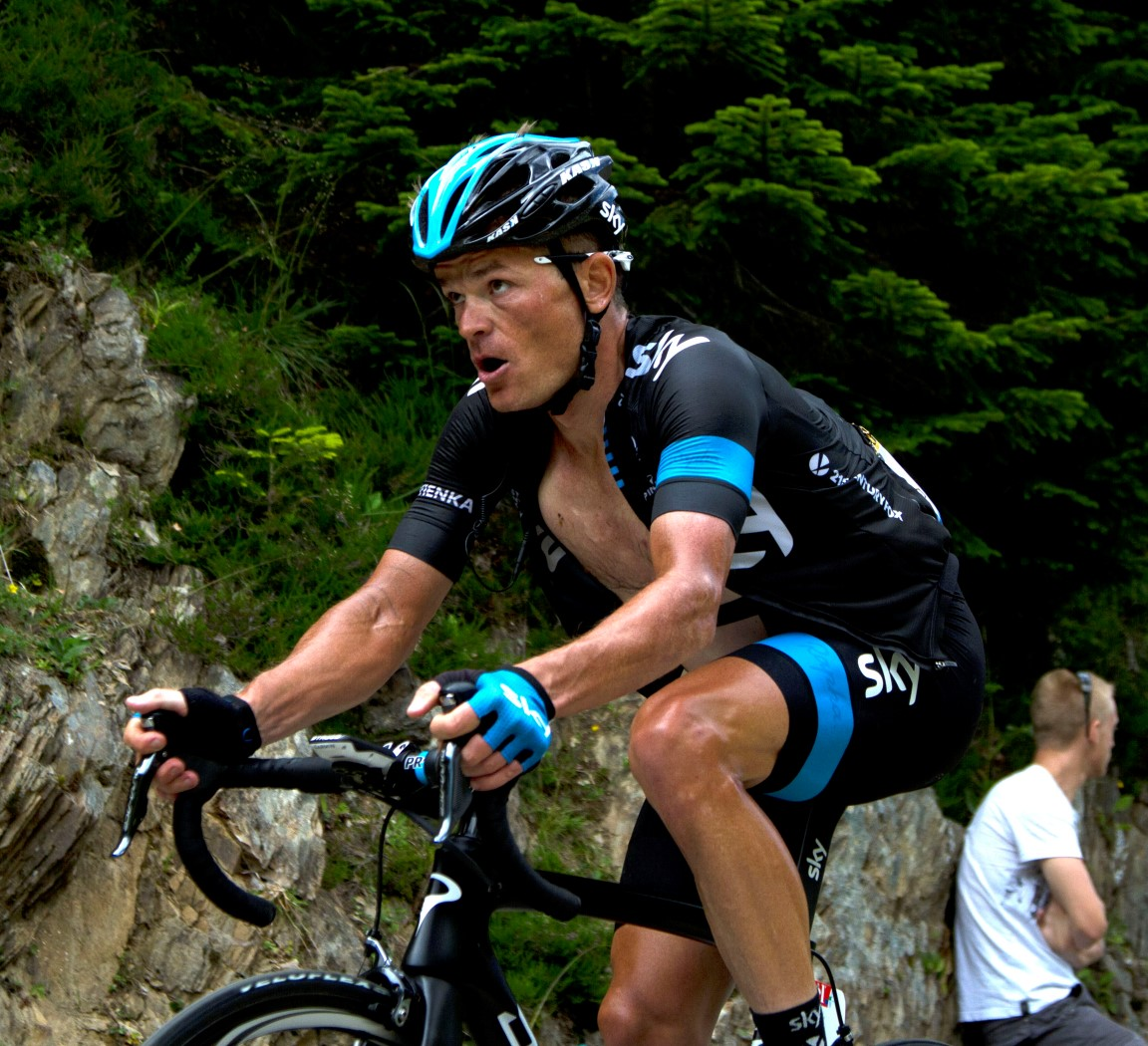
Kiryienka at the 2014 Tour de France

Kiryienka left Movistar Team at the end of the 2012 season, and joined Team Sky on an initial three-year contract from the 2013 season onwards.

In May 2015, Kiryienka won the individual time trial of the Giro d'Italia, which was 59.5 kilometres (37.0 miles) long and relatively rolling. In June 2015, he won the individual time trial at the inaugural European Games in Baku, Azerbaijan. On 23 September 2015, Kiryienka won the individual time trial at the CI Road World Championships in Richmond, Virginia, United States.

Kiryienka had the honor to carry the flag of his native Belarus at the opening ceremony of the 2016 Summer Olympics in Rio de Janeiro, where he competed in the men's individual time trial event; he finished in 17th place. In October, he competed in the same event at the World Championships in Doha, where he won the silver medal – giving him at least one medal of each colour for his career.

In January 2020, Kiryienka retired from the sport due to recurring "cardiac issues".

== Major results ==
=== Road ===
1999
3rd Time trial, National Championships
2000
2nd Time trial, National Championships
2001
2nd Time trial, National Championships
2002
1st Time trial, National Championships
2004
National Championships

2nd Time trial
3rd Road race

6th Overall Tour of Turkey
2005
1st Time trial, National Championships
1st Coppa della Pace
1st Giro del Casentino
1st Coppa Comune Castelfranco di Sopra
1st Coppa Mobilio Ponsacco – Cronometro
1st Stage 3 Giro della Toscana Under-23
2006
1st Time trial, National Championships
2nd Overall Scandinavian Week

1st Stage 3

2nd Scandinavian Open
3rd Riga Grand Prix
4th Tallinn–Tartu GP
4th Szlakiem Walk Majora Hubala
5th Overall Five Rings of Moscow
6th Time trial, UCI World Championships
8th Overall Course de la Solidarité Olympique

1st Stage 6

2007
1st Stage 3 Ster Elektrotoer
1st Stage 5 Vuelta a Burgos
2nd Overall Étoile de Bessèges
2nd Eindhoven Team Time Trial
3rd Time trial, National Championships
7th Overall Tirreno–Adriatico
8th Overall Tour of Austria
8th Tour du Haut Var
9th Time trial, UCI World Championships
9th Grand Prix de Fourmies
2008
1st Stage 19 Giro d'Italia
1st Stage 1 (TTT) Settimana Ciclistica Lombarda
2nd Time trial, National Championships
2nd Overall Ster Elektrotoer
2nd Gran Premio Città di Camaiore
7th Overall Vuelta a Murcia
2011
1st Overall Route du Sud
1st Stage 20 Giro d'Italia
2nd Overall Critérium International

1st Points classification

9th Overall Vuelta a Murcia
10th Overall Tour of the Basque Country

1st Stage 2

2012
3rd Time trial, UCI World Championships
6th Overall Critérium du Dauphiné
2013
1st Stage 18 Vuelta a España
UCI World Championships

3rd Team time trial
4th Time trial

2014
1st Stage 1b (TTT) Settimana Internazionale di Coppi e Bartali
3rd Overall Bayern Rundfahrt
4th Time trial, UCI World Championships
Combativity award Stage 11 Vuelta a España
2015
1st Time trial, UCI World Championships
1st Time trial, European Games
1st Time trial, National Championships
1st Chrono des Nations
1st Stage 14 (ITT) Giro d'Italia
2016
1st Chrono des Nations
2nd Time trial, UCI World Championships
2017
UCI World Championships

3rd Team time trial
5th Time trial

6th GP Miguel Induráin
2018
1st Time trial, National Championships
9th Time trial, UCI World Championships
2019
1st Time trial, European Games

=== Grand Tour general classification results timeline ===
Grand Tour	2008	2009	2010	2011	2012	2013	2014	2015	2016	2017	2018	2019
Giro d'Italia	35	73	37	25	—	—	—	84	—	102	DNF	—
Tour de France	—	—	60	DNF	77	DNF	86	—	103	112	—	—
Vuelta a España	34	16	—	—	—	73	110	83	—	—	—	DNF

Legend
—	Did not compete
DNF	Did not finish

=== Track ===
2003
UCI World Cup Classics, Aguascalientes

1st Individual pursuit
3rd Team pursuit

UEC European Under-23 Championships

3rd Individual pursuit
3rd Team pursuit

2004
3rd Individual pursuit, UCI World Cup Classics, Aguascalientes
2005
1st Points race, UCI World Cup Classics, Manchester
2006
UCI World Cup Classics

1st Scratch, Sydney
2nd Points race, Moscow
3rd Points race, Sydney

3rd Points race, UCI World Championships
2008
1st Points race, UCI World Championships

Summer Olympics
Preceded by Max Mirnyi	Flagbearer for Belarus; Rio de Janeiro 2016	Succeeded by Hanna Marusava; Mikita Tsmyh
