= Denis Robin (cyclist) =

French cyclist

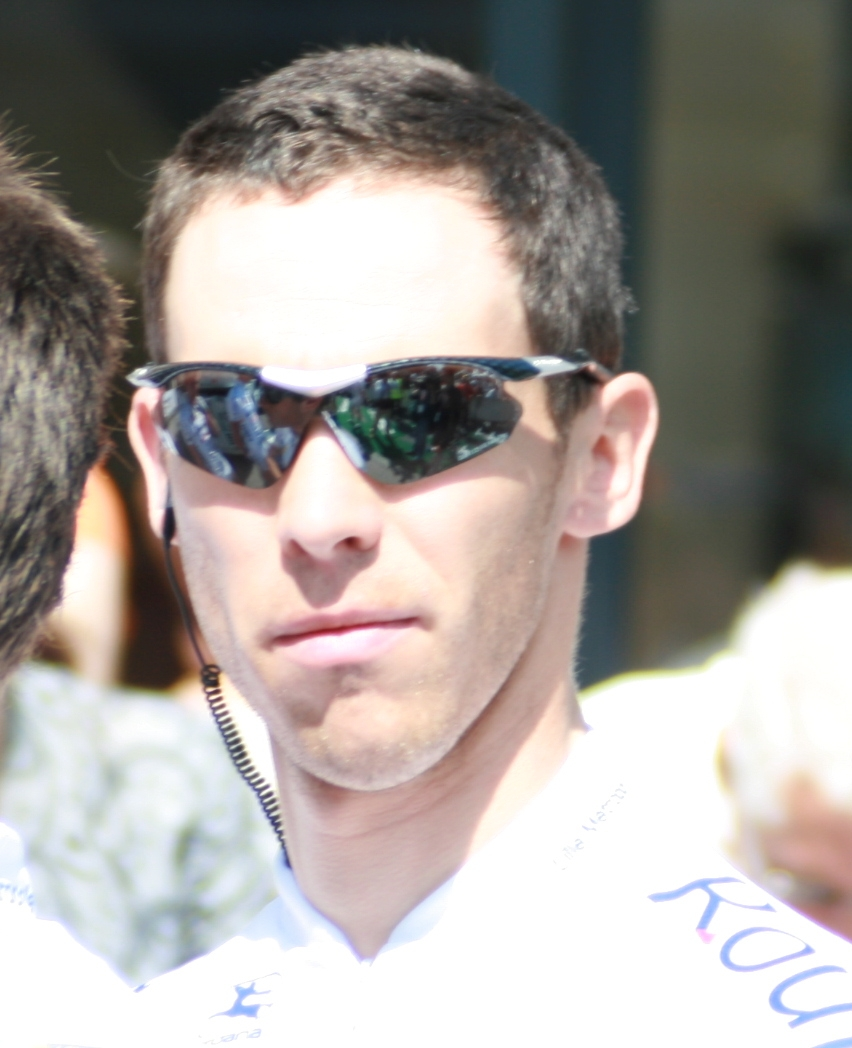
- Robin in 2008

Personal information
- Full name: Denis Robin
- Born: 27 June 1979 (age 47) Angers, France

Cycling career
- Sport: Cycling
- Current team: Retired
- Discipline: Road
- Role: Rider

Amateur teams
- 2002–2003: Crédit Agricole Espoirs
- 2004: Agritubel–Loudun 86

Professional teams
- 2005–2007: Agritubel–Loudun
- 2008: Roubaix–Lille Métropole

Denis Robin (born 27 June 1979 in Angers) is a French former road racing cyclist.

== Major results ==
2004
2nd Classic Loire Atlantique
2005
2nd Bordeaux-Saintes
2006
2nd Duo Normand (with Cédric Coutouly)
2007
2nd Duo Normand (with Émilien-Benoît Bergès)
