= 2016 Chrono des Nations =

Race details
- Dates: 23 October 2016
- Stages: 1
- Distance: 51.5 km (32.00 mi)
- Winning time: 1h 04' 08"

Results
| | Winner | Vasil Kiryienka (BLR) |
| | Second | Jonathan Castroviejo (ESP) |
| | Third | Martin Toft Madsen (DEN) |

The 2016 Chrono des Nations was the 35th edition of the Chrono des Nations cycle race and was held on 23 October 2016. The race started and finished in Les Herbiers. The race was won by Vasil Kiryienka.

== General classification ==
Final general classification

| Rank | Rider | Time |
|---|---|---|
| 1 | Vasil Kiryienka (BLR) | 1h 04' 08" |
| 2 | Jonathan Castroviejo (ESP) | + 5" |
| 3 | Martin Toft Madsen (DEN) | + 59" |
| 4 | Ryan Mullen (IRL) | + 1' 29" |
| 5 | Johan Le Bon (FRA) | + 2' 33" |
| 6 | Daniel Westmattelmann (GER) | + 2' 48" |
| 7 | Jérémy Roy (FRA) | + 2' 57" |
| 8 | Truls Korsæth (NOR) | + 3' 02" |
| 9 | Reidar Borgersen (NOR) | + 3' 07" |
| 10 | Stéphane Rossetto (FRA) | + 3' 08" |
