= Robert Béliard =

French cyclist

Personal information
- Born: 19 February 1912
- Died: 7 October 1993 (aged 81)

Cycling career
- Sport: Cycling
- Discipline: Road
- Role: Rider

Robert Béliard (19 February 1912 – 7 October 1993) was a French racing cyclist. He rode in the 1936 Tour de France.
