= Christophe Faudot =

French cyclist (born 1968)

Personal information
- Born: 27 September 1968 (age 58) Luxeuil-les-Bains, France

Cycling career
- Sport: Cycling
- Discipline: Road
- Role: Rider

Amateur team
- 1995–1999: Vendée U

Professional teams
- 1991: Toshiba
- 2000: Bonjour

Christophe Faudot (born 27 September 1968) is a French former racing cyclist. He rode in the 2000 Tour de France, but dropped out on the 8th stage.

== Major results ==
1990
3rd Overall Tour du Loir-et-Cher
3rd Paris–Troyes
1996
7th Classic Haribo
1997
2nd Tour du Finistère
1999
8th Tour du Doubs
2000
7th Tour du Doubs
