= Jean-Baptiste Intcégaray =

French cyclist

Personal information
- Born: 14 September 1908
- Died: 30 October 1989 (aged 81)

Cycling career
- Sport: Cycling
- Discipline: Road
- Role: Rider

Jean-Baptiste Intcégaray (14 September 1908 – 30 October 1989) was a French racing cyclist. He rode in the 1933 Tour de France.
