= BHS–PL Beton Bornholm =

Danish cycling team

Team information
- UCI code: ABB (2015–2019); BHS (2020); BPC (2021–)
- Registered: Denmark
- Founded: 2015
- Discipline: Road
- Status: UCI Continental

Key personnel
- General manager: Christian Juul Andreasen
- Team managers: Frank Andreasen; Jesper Andreasen; Kristiann Nicolaisen

Team name history
- 2015–2016 2017–2019 2020–: Team Almeborg-Bornholm; BHS–Almeborg Bornholm; BHS–PL Beton Bornholm

BHS–PL Beton Bornholm is a Danish UCI Continental team founded in 2015.

== Team roster ==
As of 21 March 2022.

Rider	Date of birth
Nils Broge (DEN)	4 January 1992 (age 34)
Benjamin Hertz (DEN)	14 October 2001 (age 24)
Emil Iwersen (DEN)	25 August 2000 (age 26)
Frederik Jensen (DEN)	9 January 1999 (age 27)
Adam Holm Jørgensen (DEN)	1 September 2002 (age 24)
Martin Toft Madsen (DEN)	20 February 1985 (age 41)
Nikolaj Mengel (DEN)	9 March 2002 (age 24)

Rider	Date of birth
Rasmus Søjberg Pedersen (DEN)	9 July 2002 (age 24)
Mads Rahbek (DEN)	19 October 1995 (age 30)
Stian Rosenlund (DEN)	4 April 2002 (age 24)
Sebastian Ryttersgaard (DEN)	22 December 1999 (age 26)
Emil Toudal (DEN)	28 May 1996 (age 30)
Gustav Wang (DEN)	13 March 2003 (age 23)

== Major wins ==
2016
Profronde van Noord-Holland, Mathias Westergaard
Denmark Time Trial Championships, Martin Toft Madsen
2017
Skive-Løbet, Martin Toft Madsen
Denmark Time Trial Championships, Martin Toft Madsen
2018
Classic Loire Atlantique, Rasmus Quaade
Hafjell GP, Martin Toft Madsen
Chrono Champenois Masculin International, Martin Toft Madsen
Duo Normand, Martin Toft Madsen & Rasmus Quaade
Chrono des Nations, Martin Toft Madsen
2019
Stage 2 (ITT) Danmark Rundt, Martin Toft Madsen
2022
Stage 4 International Tour of Hellas, Nils Broge
2025
Overall, Tour du Loir-et-Cher, Niklas Larsen

== National champions ==
2016
Denmark Time Trial, Martin Toft Madsen
2017
Denmark Time Trial, Martin Toft Madsen
2018
Denmark Time Trial, Martin Toft Madsen
