= Gylne Gutuer =

Annual road cycling race in Norway

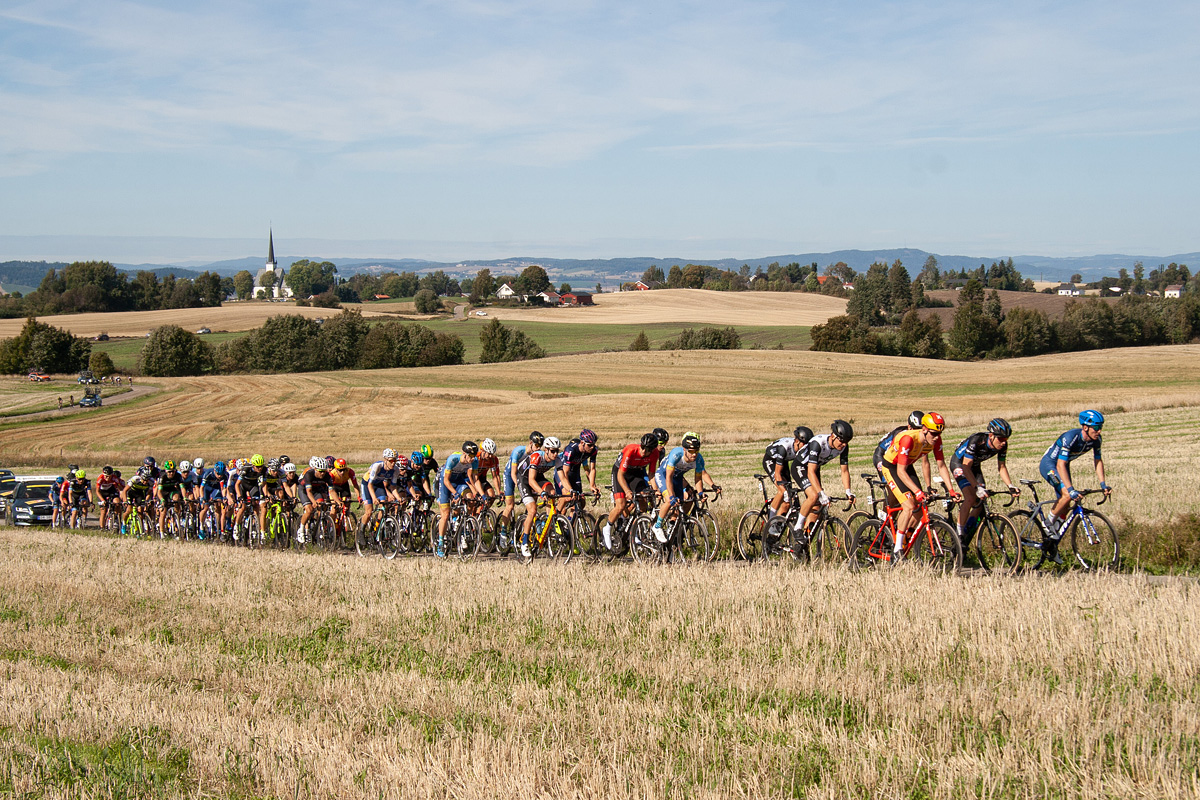
- Uno-X Development Weekend 2018 - Gylne Gutuer - peloton at Hommerstadgutua

Race details
- Date: September
- Region: Norway
- Discipline: Road
- Competition: UCI Europe Tour
- Type: single-day
- Organiser: Ottestad IL Sykkel
- Web site: www.udw.no/gylnegutuer

History
- First edition: 2018
- Editions: 6 (as of 2023)
- First winner: Jasper Philipsen (BEL)
- Most wins: No repeat winners
- Most recent: Andreas Stokbro (DEN)

The Gylne Gutuer is a single-day road cycling race held annually in Norway since 2018. It is part of UCI Europe Tour in category 1.2.

The race is part of the Uno - X Development Weekend, which takes place in late August and early September in the provinces of Hedmark and Oppland in Norway. It includes three races: the Hafjell GP, the Lillehammer GP and Gylne Gutuer.

== Winners ==
Year	Country	Rider	Team
2018	Belgium	Jasper Philipsen	Hagens Berman Axeon
2019	Norway	Kristoffer Skjerping	Uno-X Norwegian Development Team
2020	Norway	Trond Trondsen	Team Coop
2021	Denmark	William Blume Levy	Team ColoQuick
2022	Norway	André Drege	Team Coop
2023	Denmark	Andreas Stokbro	Leopard TOGT Pro Cycling
