= Hafjell TT =

Norwegian road cycling race

Race details
- Date: August
- Region: Norway
- Discipline: Road
- Competition: UCI Europe Tour
- Type: Individual time trial
- Organiser: Lillehammer Cykleklubb
- Web site: www.udw.no/hafjell

History
- First edition: 2018
- Editions: 3 (as of 2020)
- First winner: Martin Toft Madsen (DEN)
- Most wins: No repeat winners
- Most recent: Andreas Leknessund (NOR)

The Hafjell TT (known as the Hafjell GP in 2018) is a single-day individual time trial road cycling race held annually in Norway since 2018. It is part of UCI Europe Tour in category 1.2.

The race is part of the Uno - X Development Weekend, which takes place in late August and early September in the provinces of Hedmark and Oppland in Norway. It includes three races: the Hafjell GP, the Lillehammer GP, and Gylne Gutuer.

== Winners ==
Year	Country	Rider	Team
2018	Denmark	Martin Toft Madsen	BHS–Almeborg Bornholm
2019	Denmark	Mikkel Bjerg	Hagens Berman Axeon
2020	Norway	Andreas Leknessund	Uno-X Pro Cycling Team
