= Jérémy Roy (cyclist) =

French cyclist

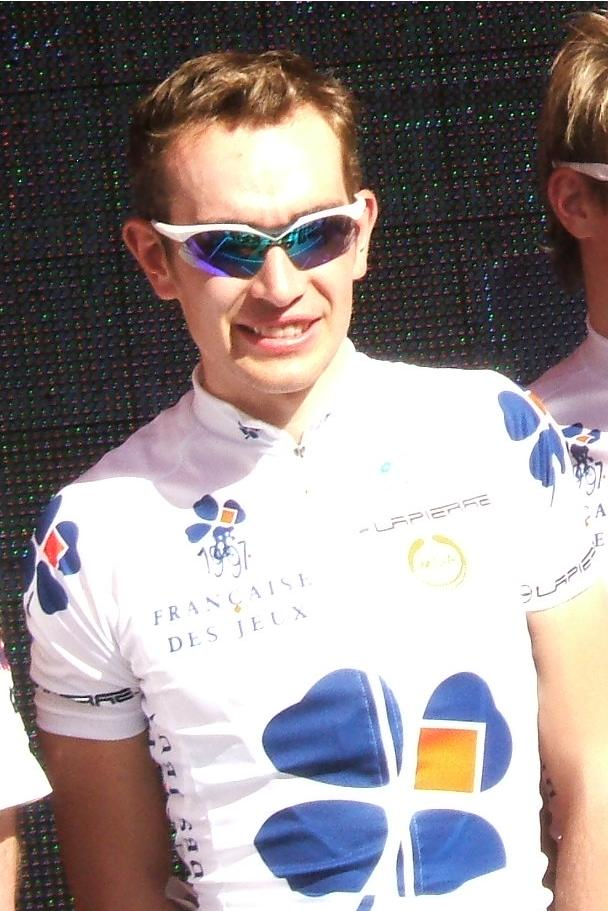
- Roy at the 2009 Tour Down Under

Personal information
- Full name: Jérémy Roy
- Born: 22 June 1983 (age 43) Tours, France
- Height: 1.86 m (6 ft 1 in)
- Weight: 70 kg (154 lb)

Cycling career
- Sport: Cycling
- Discipline: Road
- Role: Rider
- Rider type: Breakaway specialist

Professional team
- 2003–2018: FDJeux.com

Major wins
- Grand Tours Tour de France Combativity award (2011)

Jérémy Roy (born 22 June 1983) is a French former professional road bicycle racer, who competed as a professional between 2003 and 2018, spending his entire career with the Groupama–FDJ team through its various team guises. He was named the most aggressive rider of the 2011 Tour de France after escaping into breakaways on many stages and continuously attacking from inside the breakaway.

== Biography ==
Born in Tours, Roy turned professional with FDJeux.com in 2003. During his early career, he continued his studies at the French National Institute of Applied Sciences in Rennes, and graduated in 2007 in mechanical and automated engineering. Despite splitting his time between studying and cycling, Roy still finished 4th in the Tour de Picardie and won the young rider competition in 2006. Also in 2006, he finished 4th in the Châteauroux Classic de l'Indre, then 4th in the Grand Prix de Plumelec Morbihan in 2007 and 5th in the Route du Sud in 2008.

Roy gained his first professional victory on 12 March 2009, when he won stage 5 of Paris–Nice, beating his breakaway companion Thomas Voeckler in a sprint. The following year he won the Tro Bro Leon, performed well in the La Flèche Wallonne and finished third in the prologue of the Tour de Romandie.

He won his first race of 2011, the Grand Prix La Marseillaise Open in late January. He began the 2011 Tour de France by attacking on the 1st stage, and again on stage 4, winning the award for most combative rider for that stage. Roy came agonisingly close to winning stage 13, finishing third after being caught with 2.5 km to go, by Thor Hushovd and David Moncoutié, after a challenging pursuit in the final kilometres. He did, however, gain enough points to take the lead in the classification for the Polka Dot Jersey, and the combativity award once more. He also got in a break on the final stage and spent over 700 km of the race in breakaways.

== Major results ==
2001
5th Road race, UCI Junior Road World Championships
2002
4th Paris–Mantes-en-Yvelines
2003
2nd Road race, UEC European Under-23 Road Championships
2005
6th Tour du Doubs
6th Route Adélie
9th Tour de Vendée
10th Grand Prix d'Ouverture La Marseillaise
2006
4th Overall Tour de Picardie

1st Young rider classification

4th Châteauroux Classic
2007
4th Grand Prix de Plumelec-Morbihan
8th Cholet-Pays de Loire
9th Tour du Doubs
2008
5th Overall Route du Sud
7th Duo Normand (with Yoann Le Boulanger)
2009
1st Stage 5 Paris–Nice
2010
1st Tro-Bro Léon
2nd Duo Normand (with Anthony Roux)
8th Chrono des Herbiers
10th Tour du Finistère
2011
1st Grand Prix d'Ouverture La Marseillaise
2nd Duo Normand (with Anthony Roux)
Tour de France

Held Stage 13
Combativity award Stages 4, 13 & Overall

2012
2nd Time trial, National Road Championships
2nd Overall Tour du Limousin

1st Stage 4

2nd Overall Tour du Poitou-Charentes
4th Chrono des Nations
9th Overall Bayern–Rundfahrt
2013
1st Mountains classification Critérium International
2nd Time trial, National Road Championships
4th Overall Étoile de Bessèges
4th Overall Bayern–Rundfahrt
8th Chrono des Nations
2014
2nd Chrono des Nations
5th Overall Tour du Poitou-Charentes
6th Overall Étoile de Bessèges
2016
7th Chrono des Nations
8th Overall Tour du Poitou Charentes
Combativity award Stage 14 Tour de France
2017
7th Chrono des Nations
2018
3rd Duo Normand (with Bruno Armirail)
7th Chrono des Nations

=== Grand Tour general classification results timeline ===
Grand Tour	2005	2006	2007	2008	2009	2010	2011	2012	2013	2014	2015	2016	2017	2018
Giro d'Italia	—	—	—	82	—	—	—	—	—	—	—	—	73	109
Tour de France	—	—	—	121	46	142	85	66	126	57	105	96	—	—
Vuelta a España	82	122	104	—	—	—	—	—	—	—	—	—	—	—

Legend
—	Did not compete
DNF	Did not finish
