= Mathias Westergaard =

Danish cyclist

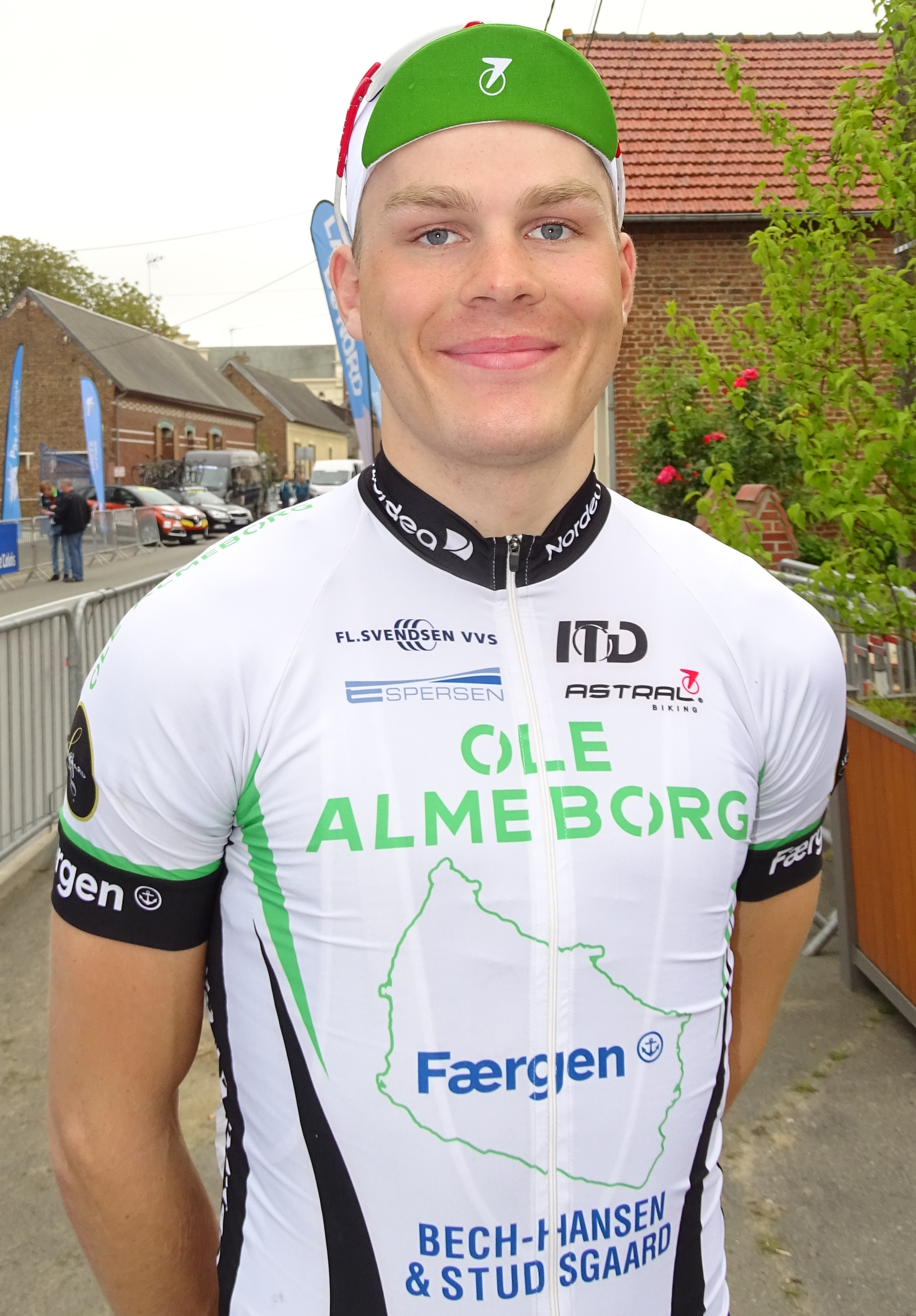
- Westergaard in 2015

Personal information
- Full name: Mathias Dam Westergaard
- Born: 21 February 1994 (age 32) Aalborg, Denmark

Cycling career
- Sport: Cycling
- Current team: BHS–PL Beton Bornholm
- Discipline: Road
- Role: Rider (retired); Directeur sportif

Professional teams
- 2013–2014: Team Designa Køkken–Knudsgaard
- 2015–2016: Team Almeborg–Bornholm
- 2017: Riwal Platform

Managerial team
- 2019–: BHS–Almeborg Bornholm

Mathias Dam Westergaard (born 21 February 1994) is a Danish former professional cyclist, who currently works as a directeur sportif for UCI Continental team BHS–PL Beton Bornholm.

== Major results ==
2012
1st Stage 3 Driedaagse van Axel
2015
3rd Duo Normand
2016
1st Ronde van Noord-Holland
5th Sundvolden GP
