= Duo Normand =

French two-man team time trial road cycling race

Race details
- Date: September
- Region: Normandy, France
- English name: Duo Normandy
- Local name(s): Duo Normand (in French)
- Discipline: Road
- Competition: UCI Europe Tour
- Type: Two-man team time-trial
- Web site: www.duonormand.com

History
- First edition: 1982
- Editions: 38 (as of 2019)
- First winner: Philippe Bouvatier (FRA); Bruce Péan (FRA)
- Most wins: Chris Boardman (GBR); Luke Durbridge (AUS); Svein Tuft (CAN); Thierry Marie (FRA) (3 wins)
- Most recent: Mathias Norsgaard (DEN) Rasmus Quaade (DEN)

The Duo Normand is a two-man team time trial (against the clock) for elite racing cyclists. Held annually at Marigny-le-Lozon in Normandy, France, it was instituted in 1982. Launched by a local cycling association, the Duo Normand takes place on a road circuit of more than 54 km (34 mi) every September.

== History ==
The first three editions were for amateurs only; professionals were admitted from the fourth edition, in 1985.

In 2016 a British rider died following a collision with a support car, 200m before the finish.

== Winners ==
Year	Winners	Second place	Third place
1982	Philippe Bouvatier (FRA); Bruce Péan (FRA)		
1983	Brian Holm (DEN); Jack Olsen (DEN)		
1984	Christophe Gicquel (FRA); Christophe Bachelot (FRA)		
1985	Thierry Marie (FRA); Charly Mottet (FRA)	William Pérard (FRA); Jacques Dutailly (FRA)	
1986	Jack Olsen (DEN); Peter Gilling (DEN)		
1987	Thierry Marie (FRA); Gérard Rué (FRA)	Richard Vivien (FRA); Laurent Bezault (FRA)	Bernard Richard (FRA); Roland Leclercq (FRA)
1988	Thierry Marie (FRA); Philippe Bouvatier (FRA)	Peter Verbeken (BEL); Bart Leysen (BEL)	Atle Kvålsvoll (NOR); Olaf Lurvik (NOR)
1989	Romes Gainetdinov (URS); Pavel Tonkov (URS)	Richard Vivien (FRA); Jean-Louis Harel (FRA)	Paul Haghedooren (BEL); Rob Harmeling (NLD)
1990	Dimitri Vassilichenko (URS); Yuri Manuylov (URS)	Francis Moreau (FRA); Laurent Pillon (FRA)	Michel Cargnello (BEL); Jean-Luc Tasset (BEL)
1991	Vjaceslav Džavanjan (URS); Andrei Teteriouk (URS)	Jan Karlsson (SWE); Björn Johansson (SWE)	Thierry Gouvenou (FRA); Christophe Capelle (FRA)
1992	Gianfranco Contri (ITA); Luca Colombo (ITA)	Jan Karlsson (SWE); Glenn Magnusson (SWE)	Marcel Wüst (GER); Jean-Philippe Dojwa (FRA)
1993	Chris Boardman (GBR); Laurent Bezault (FRA)	Pascal Lance (FRA); Eddy Seigneur (FRA)	Jan Karlsson (SWE); Magnus Knutsson (SWE)
1994	Gianfranco Contri (ITA); Cristian Salvato (ITA)	Fabian Jeker (SUI); Beat Meister (SUI)	Peter Verbeken (BEL); Marc Streel (BEL)
1995	Emmanuel Magnien (FRA); Stéphane Pétilleau (FRA)	Pierre-Henri Menthéour (FRA); Francis Urien (FRA)	Jean-Louis Harel (FRA); Grégoire Balland (FRA)
1996	Chris Boardman (GBR); Paul Manning (GBR)	Jean-François Anti (FRA); Stéphane Cueff (FRA)	Pascal Lance (FRA); Marek Leśniewski (POL)
1997	Henk Vogels (AUS); Cyril Bos (FRA)	Eddy Seigneur (FRA); Andrea Peron (ITA)	Pascal Lance (FRA); Marek Leśniewski (POL)
1998	Magnus Bäckstedt (SWE); Jérôme Neuville (FRA)	Carlos Da Cruz (FRA); Guillaume Auger (FRA)	Francis Moreau (FRA); David Millar (GBR)
1999	Chris Boardman (GBR); Jens Voigt (GER)	Artūras Kasputis (LTU); Gilles Maignan (FRA)	Frédéric Guesdon (FRA); Bradley McGee (AUS)
2000	László Bodrogi (HUN); Daniele Nardello (ITA)	Marco Pinotti (ITA); Rubens Bertogliati (SUI)	Frédéric Finot (FRA); Anthony Langella (FRA)
2001	Jonathan Vaughters (USA); Jens Voigt (GER)	Michael Rogers (AUS); Fabian Cancellara (SUI)	Bart Voskamp (NLD); Remco van der Ven (NLD)
2002	Evgeni Petrov (RUS); Filippo Pozzato (ITA)	Jonas Olsson (SWE); Gustav Larsson (SWE)	Christian Poos (LUX); Andy Cappelle (BEL)
2003	Jean Nuttli (SUI); Philippe Schnyder (SUI)	Benjamin Levecot (FRA); Noan Lelarge (FRA)	Eugen Wacker (KGZ); Artem Botchkarev (GER)
2004	Eddy Seigneur (FRA); Frédéric Finot (FRA)	Benjamin Levecot (FRA); Noan Lelarge (FRA)	Sandy Casar (FRA); Carlos Da Cruz (FRA)
2005	Sylvain Chavanel (FRA); Thierry Marichal (BEL)	Yuriy Krivtsov (UKR); Erki Pütsep (EST)	Dominique Cornu (BEL); Jürgen Roelandts (BEL)
2006	Ondřej Sosenka (TCH); Radek Blahut (TCH)	Denis Robin (FRA); Cédric Coutouly (FRA)	Florent Brard (FRA); Stéphane Bergès (FRA)
2007	Bradley Wiggins (GBR); Michiel Elijzen (NLD)	Émilien-Benoît Bergès (FRA); Denis Robin (FRA)	Gustav Larsson (SWE); Víctor Hugo Peña (COL)
2008	Michael Tronborg (DEN); Martin Mortensen (DEN)	Casper Jørgensen (DEN); Michael Mørkøv (DEN)	Lieuwe Westra (NLD); Jos Pronk (NLD)
2009	Nikolay Trusov (RUS); Artem Ovechkin (RUS)	Sergey Firsanov (RUS); Aleksejs Saramotins (LAT)	Evgeny Popov (RUS); Alexander Porsev (RUS)
2010	Alexandre Pliușchin (MDA); Artem Ovechkin (RUS)	Jérémy Roy (FRA); Anthony Roux (FRA)	Nikita Novikov (RUS); Dmitry Ignatiev (RUS)
2011	Thomas Dekker (NED); Johan Vansummeren (BEL)	Jérémy Roy (FRA); Anthony Roux (FRA)	Martijn Keizer (NED); Jens Mouris (NED)
2012	Luke Durbridge (AUS); Svein Tuft (CAN)	Alex Dowsett (GBR); Luke Rowe (GBR)	Andreas Hofer (AUT); Robert Vrečer (SLO)
2013	Luke Durbridge (AUS); Svein Tuft (CAN)	Michael Hepburn (AUS); Jens Mouris (NED)	Kristof Vandewalle (BEL); Julien Vermote (BEL)
2014	Reidar Borgersen (NOR); Truls Engen Korsaeth (NOR)	Anthony Delaplace (FRA); Arnaud Gérard (FRA)	Ivan Balykin (RUS); Artem Ovechkin (RUS)
2015	Victor Campenaerts (BEL); Jelle Wallays (BEL)	Dimitri Claeys (BEL); Olivier Pardini (BEL)	Martin Toft Madsen (DEN); Mathias Westergaard (DEN)
2016	Luke Durbridge (AUS); Svein Tuft (CAN)	Lars Carstensen (DEN); Martin Toft Madsen (DEN)	Marc Fournier (FRA); Johan Le Bon (FRA)
2017	Anthony Delaplace (FRA); Pierre-Luc Périchon (FRA)	Mikkel Bjerg (DEN); Mathias Norsgaard (DEN)	David Boucher (BEL); Timothy Stevens (BEL)
2018	Martin Toft Madsen (DEN); Rasmus Quaade (DEN)	Emil Vinjebo (DEN); Casper von Folsach (DEN)	Jérémy Roy (FRA); Bruno Armirail (FRA)
2019	Mathias Norsgaard (DEN); Rasmus Quaade (DEN)	Christophe Laporte (FRA); Anthony Perez (FRA)	Matthias Brändle (AUT); Patrick Gamper (AUT)
